= Swedish Figure Skating Championships =

Recurring figure skating competition

- Status: Active
- Genre: National championships
- Frequency: Annual
- Country: Sweden
- Inaugurated: 1895
- Organizer: Swedish Figure Skating Federation

The Swedish Figure Skating Championships (Swedish: Svenska mästerskapen i konståkning) are an annual figure skating competition organized by the Swedish Figure Skating Federation (Swedish: Svenska Konståkningsförbundet) to crown the national champions of Sweden. The first official Swedish Championships were held in 1895 in Stockholm. Originally, the only figure skating event was for men; Ulrich Salchow, the man responsible for inventing the Salchow jump, was the inaugural champion. Early championships featured events in both speed skating and figure skating. An event for women was added in 1908, pair skating in 1912, and ice dance in 1980. Early championships were periodically interrupted, but they remained uninterrupted from 1931 until 2021, when the Swedish Figure Skating Federation was forced to cancel the competition due to the COVID-19 pandemic.

Medals are awarded in men's singles, women's singles, pair skating, and ice dance at the senior and junior levels, although each discipline may not be held every year due to a lack of participants. Hans Lindh currently holds the record for winning the most Swedish Championship titles in men's singles (with eleven), while Gunnel Mothander (née Ericson) holds the record in women's singles (with twelve). Britta Råhlén and Bo Mothander hold the record in pair skating (with seven), while Åsa Agblad holds the record in ice dance (with four), although not all with the same partner.

== Senior medalists ==
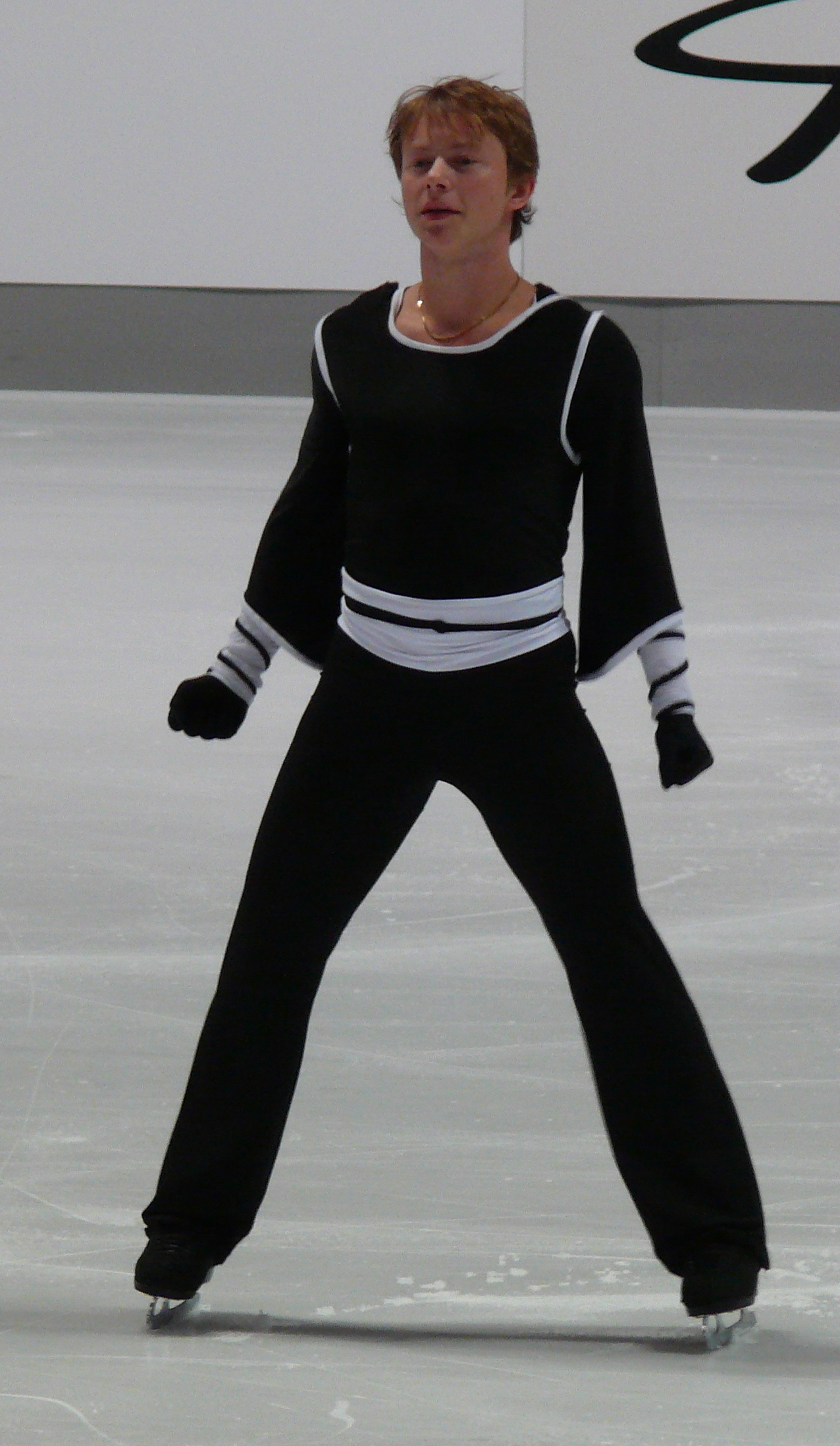
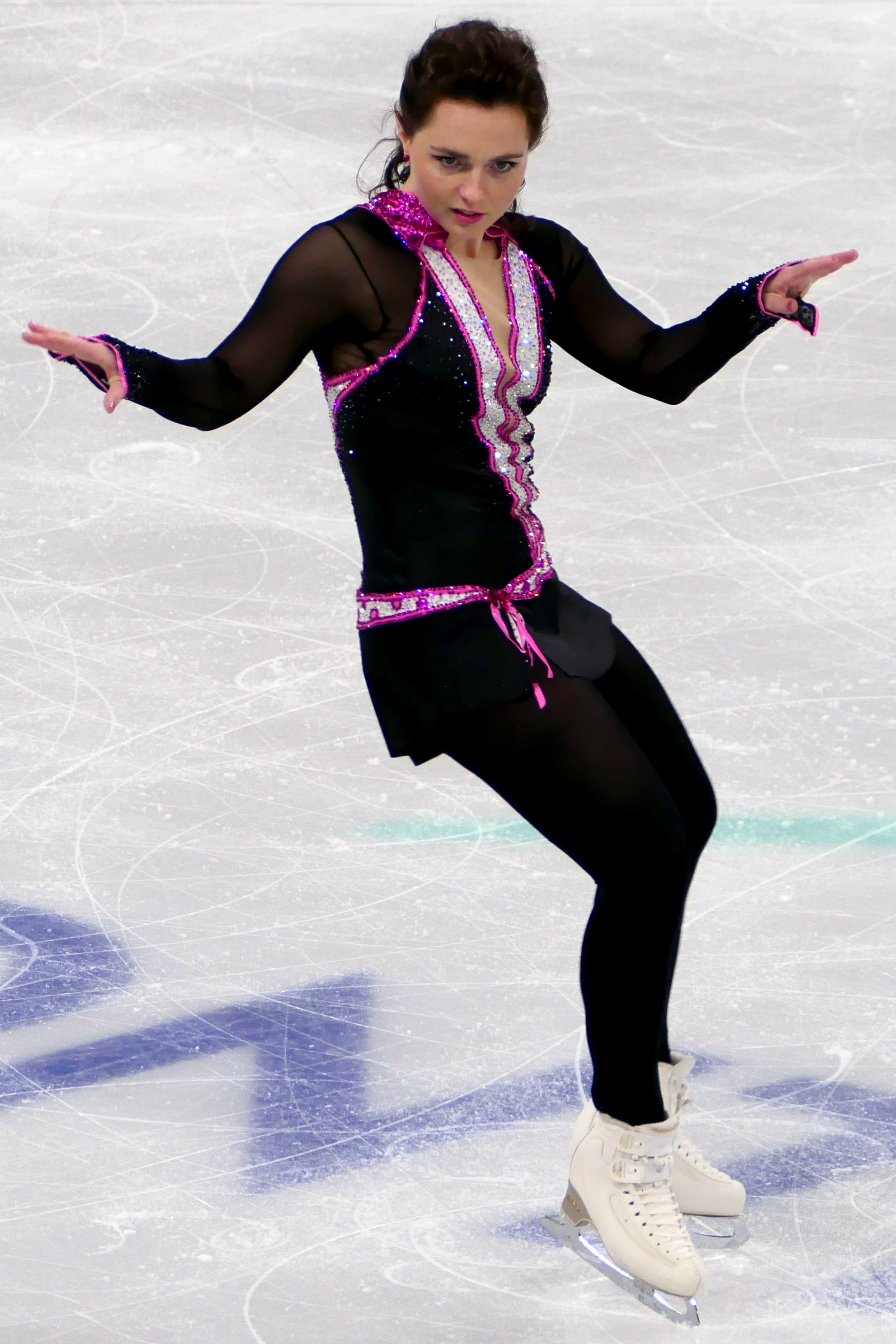
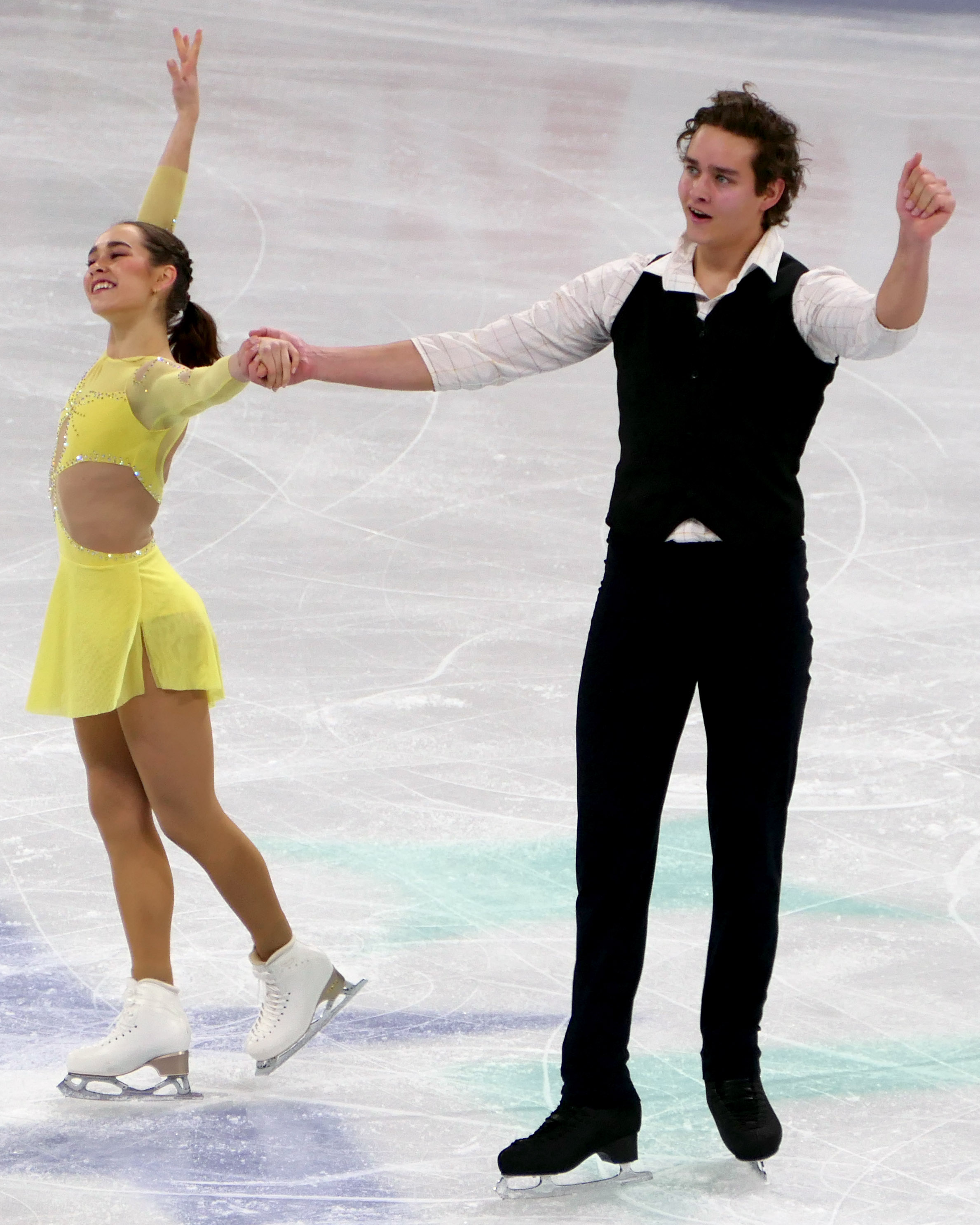
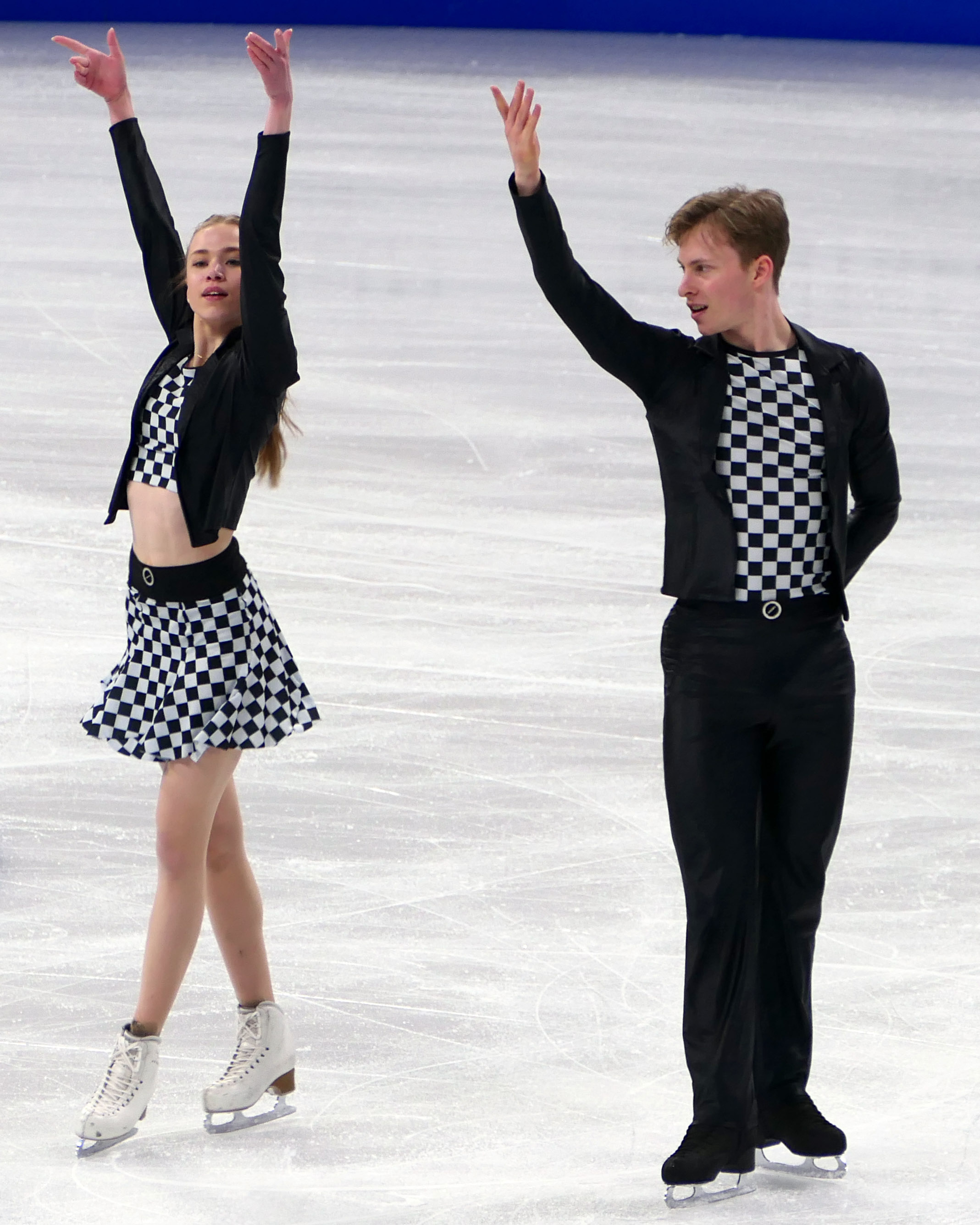
From left to right: Alexander Majorov, six-time Swedish champion in men's singles; Josefin Taljegård, three-time Swedish champion in women's singles; Greta Crafoord and John Crafoord, three-time Swedish champions in pair skating; and Milla Ruud Reitan and Nikolaj Majorov, three-time Swedish champions in ice dance

=== Men's singles ===
Senior men's event medalists
Year	Location	Gold	Silver	Bronze	Ref.
1895	Stockholm	Ulrich Salchow	Thiodolf Borgh	J. Andersson	
1896	Stockholm	Ulrich Salchow	Thiodolf Borgh	Jakob Andrén	
1897	Gothenburg	Ulrich Salchow	Thiodolf Borgh	Erik Lagergren	
1898–1901	No competitions held				
1902	Stockholm	Jakob Andrén	Gunnar Stenberg	E. Wirström	
1903	No competition held				
1904	Gävle	Richard Johansson	Per Thorén	Bror Meyer	
1905	Norrköping	Per Thorén	Bror Meyer	Sven Billing	
1906	Gothenburg	Bror Meyer	Per Thorén	Richard Johansson	
1907	Stockholm	Per Thorén	Richard Johansson	Ivar Wennerholm	
1908	Karlstad	Richard Johansson	Per Thorén	Ivar von Feilitzen	
1909	Gävle	Richard Johansson	Karl Axel Holmström	Birger Forsberg	
1910	Falun	Richard Johansson	Gösta Sandahl	Carl Sandahl	
1911	Stockholm	Gösta Sandahl	Carl Sandahl	Thore Mothander	
1912	Gothenburg	Gösta Sandahl	Gillis Grafström	Olof Hultgren	
1913	Stockholm	Gösta Sandahl	Olof Hultgren	Harry Flodenberg	
1914	No competition held				
1915	Stockholm	Harald Rooth	Axel Hultgren	No other competitors	
1916	Stockholm	Gösta Sandahl	Harald Rooth	Harry Flodenberg	
1917	Stockholm	Gillis Grafström	Harry Flodenberg	Lars Grafström	
1918	Stockholm	Gillis Grafström	Wiktor Winberg	Thore Mothander	
1919	Stockholm	Gillis Grafström	Wiktor Winberg	Thore Mothander	
1920	Stockholm	Wictor Winberg	Lars Grafström	Kaj af Ekström	
1921	Eskilstuna	Wictor Winberg	Kaj af Ekström	No other competitors	
1922	Stockholm	Lars Grafström	Thore Mothander	Kaj af Ekström	
1923	Djursholm	Gösta Sandahl	Lars Grafström	Kaj af Ekström	
1924	Stockholm	Kaj af Ekström	Thore Mothander	No other competitors	
1925	No competition held				
1926	Eskilstuna	Thore Mothander	Einar Törsleff	No other competitors	
1927	Södertälje	Thore Mothander	Einar Törsleff	No other competitors	
1928	Uppsala	Einar Törsleff	No other competitors		
1929	Stockholm	Nils Lindgren	Thore Mothander	Einar Törsleff	
1930	No competition held				
1931	Stockholm	Wictor Winberg	Nils Lindgren	No other competitors	
1932	Stockholm	Nils Lindgren	No other competitors		
1933	Stockholm	Nils Lindgren	Einar Fagerstedt	No other competitors	
1934	Stockholm	Nils Lindgren	Bo Mothander	Einar Fagerstedt	
1935	Stockholm	Nils Lindgren	Eric Hultén	Bo Mothander	
1936	Stockholm	Nils Lindgren	Bo Mothander	Einar Fagerstedt	
1937	Stockholm	Bo Mothander	Nils Lindgren	Harry Karlsson	
1938	Stockholm	Bo Mothander	No other competitors		
1939	Stockholm	Bo Mothander	Eric Hultén	Bengt von Feilitzen	
1940	Stockholm	Bo Mothander	Bengt von Feilitzen	No other competitors	
1941	Stockholm	Bo Mothander	Arne Johnson	Harry Karlsson	
1942	Stockholm	Bo Mothander	Bengt von Feilitzen	Harry Karlsson	
1943	Stockholm	Bo Mothander	Sven Brandelius	No other competitors	
1944	Stockholm	Bo Mothander	Sven Brandelius	No other competitors	
1945	Gävle	Bo Mothander	Sven Brandelius	Ulf Berendt	
1946	Stockholm	Bo Mothander	Sven Brandelius	No other competitors	
1947	Stockholm	Hans Lindh	Ulf Berendt	No other competitors	
1948	Solna	Hans Lindh	Sven Brandelius	Harry Karlsson	
1949	Stockholm	Hans Lindh	Torgil Rosenberg	No other competitors	
1950	Stockholm	Hans Lindh	Torgil Rosenberg	No other competitors	
1951	Stockholm	Hans Lindh	Torgil Rosenberg	No other competitors	
1952	Rättvik	Hans Lindh	Ulf Berendt	Torgil Rosenberg	
1953	Uppsala	Hans Lindh	Torgil Rosenberg	Ronny Hall	
1954	Gothenburg	Hans Lindh	Ronny Hall	No other competitors	
1955	Stockholm	Hans Lindh	Ronny Hall	No other competitors	
1956	Södertälje	Hans Lindh	Ronny Hall	Torgil Rosenberg	
1957	Malmö	Hans Lindh	Ronny Hall	Torgil Rosenberg	
1958	Skönsberg	Ronny Hall	Raymond Wiklander	Torgil Rosenberg	
1959	Västerås	Raymond Wiklander	Ronny Hall	Sven Pettersson	
1960	Leksand	Raymond Wiklander	Sven Pettersson	No other competitors	
1961	Nyköping	Raymond Wiklander	Sven Pettersson	Christer Ericsson	
1962	Landskrona	Raymond Wiklander	Sven Pettersson	Hans-Åke Ahlgren	
1963	Östersund	Raymond Wiklander	Torgny Berg	Sven Pettersson	
1964	Umeå	Jan Ullmark	Raymond Wiklander	Torgny Berg	
1965	Stockholm	Jan Ullmark	Tony Berntler	Roger Johansson	
1966	Västerås	Jan Ullmark	Tony Berntler	Thomas Callerud	
1967	Örebro	Tony Berntler	Thomas Callerud	Jan Ullmark	
1968	Mora	Thomas Callerud	Tony Berntler	Jan Ullmark	
1969	Landskrona	Thomas Callerud	Tony Berntler	No other competitors	
1970	Jönköping	Thomas Callerud	Tony Berntler	No other competitors	
1971	Malmö	Thomas Callerud	Thomas Öberg	No other competitors	
1972	Södertälje	Thomas Öberg	No other competitors		
1973	Landskrona	Thomas Öberg	Per Andersson	Ronald Meissl	
1974	Västerås	Thomas Öberg	Nils-Åke Nelson	Hans Vallon	
1975	Sundsvall	Thomas Öberg	Thomas Callerud	Nils-Åke Nelson	
1976	Helsingborg	Thomas Öberg	Thomas Callerud	Nils-Åke Nelson	
1977	Stockholm	Thomas Öberg	Nils-Åke Nelson	Lars Åkesson	
1978	Malmö	Thomas Öberg	Nils-Åke Nelson	Matthias Eidmann	
1979	Stockholm	Thomas Öberg	Matthias Eidmann	Lars Åkesson	
1980	Helsingborg	Thomas Öberg	Matthias Eidmann	Lars Åkesson	
1981	Karlskrona	Lars Åkesson	Karel Landys	Peter Söderholm	
1982	Landskrona	Lars Åkesson	Peter Söderholm	Karel Landys	
1983	Stockholm	Lars Åkesson	Peter Söderholm	No other competitors	
1984	Piteå	Lars Åkesson	Peter Johansson	No other competitors	
1985	Helsingborg	Lars Åkesson	Peter Johansson	Peter Söderholm	
1986	Malmö	Lars Åkesson	Peter Johansson	Kim Ketelsen	
1987	Östersund	Peter Johansson	Kim Ketelsen	No other competitors	
1988	Lidingö	Peter Johansson	Kim Ketelsen	Emanuele Ancorini	
1989	Gothenburg	Peter Johansson	Emanuele Ancorini	Håkan Byström	
1990	Örebro	Peter Johansson	Emanuele Ancorini	John Augustsson	
1991	Västerås	Niclas Karlsson	Håkan Byström	John Augustsson	
1992	Mölndal	Emanuele Ancorini	Niclas Karlsson	Håkan Byström	
1993	Växjö	Emanuele Ancorini	Niclas Karlsson	Ludvig Mannbro	
1994	Gothenburg	Tobias Karlsson	Veli-Pekka Riihinen	Joel Mangs	
1995	Linköping	Veli-Pekka Riihinen	Ludvig Mannbro	Joel Mangs	
1996	Helsingborg	Ludvig Mannbro	Veli-Pekka Riihinen	No other competitors	
1997	Malmö	Ludvig Mannbro	No other competitors		
1998	Vallentuna	No men's competitors			
1999	Örnsköldsvik	Filip Stiller	No other competitors		
2000	Upplands Väsby	Kristoffer Berntsson	Filip Stiller	No other competitors	
2001	Skövde	Kristoffer Berntsson	Filip Stiller	No other competitors	
2002	Växjö	Filip Stiller	Mikael Olofsson	No other competitors	
2003	Uddevalla	Filip Stiller	Duran O'Hara Lindblom	No other competitors	
2004	Örebro	Kristoffer Berntsson	Filip Stiller	Duran O'Hara Lindblom	
2005	Nyköping	Kristoffer Berntsson	Filip Stiller	Duran O'Hara Lindblom	
2006	Karlskrona	Adrian Schultheiss	Kristoffer Berntsson	Filip Stiller	
2007	Borås	Kristoffer Berntsson	Adrian Schultheiss	Justus Strid	
2008	Gothenburg	Kristoffer Berntsson	Adrian Schultheiss	No other competitors	
2009	Linköping	Kristoffer Berntsson	Alexander Majorov	Anton Truvé	
2010	Linköping	Kristoffer Berntsson	Adrian Schultheiss	Alexander Majorov	
2011	Malmö	Kristoffer Berntsson	Adrian Schultheiss	Alexander Majorov	
2012	Malmö	Alexander Majorov	Mathias Andersson	Michael Neuman	
2013	Växjö	Alexander Majorov	Ondrej Spiegl	Mathias Andersson	
2014	Växjö	Alexander Majorov	Marcus Björk	Josef Oscarsson-Eriksson	
2015	Västerås	Ondrej Spiegl	Marcus Björk	Trevor Bergqvist	
2016	Helsingborg	Ondrej Spiegl	Illya Solomin	Trevor Bergqvist	
2017	Malmö	Alexander Majorov	Ondrej Spiegl	Marcus Björk	
2018	Skellefteå	Alexander Majorov	Illya Solomin	Daniel Engelson	
2019	Karlskrona	Alexander Majorov	Nikolaj Majorov	Natran Tzagai	
2020	Ulricehamn	Nikolaj Majorov	Illya Solomin	Natran Tzagai	
2021	Linköping	Competition cancelled due to the COVID-19 pandemic			
2022	Borlänge	Nikolaj Majorov	Gabriel Folkesson	Johan Sparr	
2023	Borås	Andreas Nordebäck	Nikolaj Majorov	Gabriel Folkesson	
2024	Norrköping	Gabriel Folkesson	Casper Johansson	Jonathan Egyptson	
2025	Västerås	Casper Johansson	Andreas Nordebäck	Gabriel Folkesson	
2026	Landskrona	Andreas Nordebäck	Casper Johansson	Hugo Bostedt	

=== Women's singles ===
Senior women's event medalists
Year	Location	Gold	Silver	Bronze	Ref.
1908	Karlstad	Gurli Åhgren	Irma Pagel	Majken Törnvall	
1909	Köping	Valborg Lindahl	Ingeborg Clareus	No other competitors	
1910	Falun	Eva Lindahl	Svea Norén	Valborg Lindahl	
1911	Stockholm	Magda Mauroy	Elly Svensson	No other competitors	
1912	Gothenburg	Elna Montgomery	Magda Mauroy	Svea Norén	
1913	Stockholm	Svea Norén	Magda Mauroy	Irma Pagel	
1914	No competition held				
1915	Stockholm	Svea Norén	Magda Mauroy	Eva Lindahl	
1916	Stockholm	Magda Mauroy	Elna Montgomery	Irma Pagel	
1917	Stockholm	Svea Norén	Magda Mauroy	Greta Hellström	
1918	Stockholm	Magda Mauroy	Ragnvi Torslow	Anna-Lisa Collin	
1919	Stockholm	Svea Norén	Magda Mauroy	Ragnvi Torslow	
1920	Stockholm	Ragnvi Torslow	Margit Edlund	Anna-Lisa Collin	
1921	Eskilstuna	Ragnvi Torslow	Margit Edlund	Anna-Lisa Collin	
1922	Stockholm	Ragnvi Torslow	Margit Edlund	Anna-Lisa Collin	
1923	Djursholm	Ragnvi Torslow	Greta Nissen	Anna-Lisa Collin	
1924	Stockholm	Ragnvi Torslow	Greta Nissen	Anna-Lisa Collin	
1925	No competition held				
1926	Eskilstuna	Margit Edlund	Etty Wictorin-Ohlsson	Anna-Lisa Collin	
1927	Södertälje	Vivi-Anne Hultén	Anna-Lisa Collin	Etty Wictorin-Ohlsson	
1928	Uppsala	Vivi-Anne Hultén	Karin Andrén	Karin Berthold	
1929	Stockholm	Vivi-Anne Hultén	Dagmar Persson	Margit Josephson	
1930	No competition held				
1931	Stockholm	Karin Berthold	Harriet Ekman	Ruth Tempte	
1932	Stockholm	Karin Berthold	Ruth Tempte	Harriet Ekman	
1933	Stockholm	Vivi-Anne Hultén	Ruth Tempte	Gunvor Rahmqvist	
1934	Stockholm	Vivi-Anne Hultén	Gunnel Ericson	No other competitors	
1935	Stockholm	Gunnel Ericson	Gunvor Rahmqvist	Ruth Tempte	
1936	Stockholm	Gunnel Ericson	Gunvor Rahmqvist	Ruth Tempte	
1937	Stockholm	Gunnel Ericson	Gunvor Toreskog	Britta Råhlén	
1938	Stockholm	Gunnel Ericson	Britta Råhlén	Greta Hedberg	
1939	Stockholm	Britta Råhlén	Sonja Fuhrman	Maj-Britt Röningberg	
1940	Stockholm	Britta Råhlén	Sonja Fuhrman	Maj-Britt Röningberg	
1941	Stockholm	Sonja Fuhrmann	Maj-Britt Röningberg	Britta Råhlén	
1942	Stockholm	Britta Råhlén	Sonja Fuhrman	Maj-Britt Röningberg	
1943	Stockholm	Britta Råhlén	Sonja Fuhrman	Maj-Britt Röningberg	
1944	Stockholm	Britta Råhlén	Gunnel Ericson	Sonja Fuhrman	
1945	Gävle	Britta Råhlén	Gunnel Ericson	Sonja Fuhrman	
1946	Stockholm	Britta Råhlén	Gunnel Ericson	Maj-Britt Röningberg	
1947	Stockholm	Gunnel Mothander	Margareta Carlsson	Gun Hammarin	
1948	Solna	Gunnel Mothander	Margareta Carlsson	Maj-Britt Röningberg	
1949	Stockholm	Gunnel Mothander	Maj-Britt Graner	Margareta Carlsson	
1950	Stockholm	Gunnel Mothander	Maj-Britt Graner	Margareta Carlsson	
1951	Stockholm	Gunnel Mothander	Margareta Carlsson	Margaretha Brungårdh	
1952	Rättvik	Gunnel Mothander	Margaretha Brungårdh	Maj-Britt Graner	
1953	Uppsala	Gunnel Mothander	Margaretha Brungårdh	Ally Lundström	
1954	Gothenburg	Gunnel Mothander	Berit Andersson	Ally Lundström	
1955	Stockholm	Margaretha Brungårdh	Ally Lundström	Berit Andersson	
1956	Södertälje	Ally Lundström	Berit Andersson	Gunhild Frylén	
1957	Malmö	Ally Lundström	Gunhild Frylén	Britta Eriksson	
1958	Skönsberg	Grunhild Frylén	Britta Eriksson	Ulla Nedegård	
1959	Västerås	Grunhild Frylén	Ulla Nedegård	Gunilla Ljunggren	
1960	Leksand	Grunhild Frylén	Britta Eriksson	Ulla Nedegård	
1961	Nyköping	Britta Eriksson	Christina Ljunggren	Gunilla Ljunggren	
1962	Landskrona	Ann-Margreth Frei	Britt Elfving	Gunilla Ljunggren	
1963	Östersund	Ann-Margreth Frei	Britt Elfving	Eva Brodén	
1964	Umeå	Ann-Margreth Frei	Britt Elfving	Britta Eriksson-Nilsson	
1965	Stockholm	Britt Elfving	Görel Sigurdsson	Gunilla Victor	
1966	Västerås	Britt Elfving	Görel Sigurdsson	Christina Carlsson	
1967	Örebro	Britt Elfving	Christina Carlsson	Gunilla Victor	
1968	Mora	Britt Elfving	Eva Hermansson	Louise Lettström	
1969	Landskrona	Britt Elfving	Eva Hermansson	Louise Lettström	
1970	Jönköping	Anita Johansson	Eva Hermansson	Anne Swärd	
1971	Malmö	Anita Johansson	Lise-Lotte Öberg	Louise Lettström	
1972	Södertälje	Anita Johansson	Lise-Lotte Öberg	Lena Håkansson	
1973	Landskrona	Lise-Lotte Öberg	Lena Håkansson	Eva Hansson	
1974	Västerås	Lise-Lotte Öberg	Eva Hansson	Lotta Crispin	
1975	Sundsvall	Lise-Lotte Öberg	Lotta Crispin	Eva Hansson	
1976	Helsingborg	Lise-Lotte Öberg	Lotta Crispin	Eva Hansson	
1977	Stockholm	Lotta Crispin	Bodil Olsson	Christina Svensson	
1978	Malmö	Bodil Olsson	Carola Persson	Jeanette Capocci	
1979	Stockholm	Christina Svensson	Bodil Olsson	Lotta Falkenbäck	
1980	Helsingborg	Bodil Olsson	Catarina Lindgren	Lotta Falkenbäck	
1981	Karlskrona	Catarina Lindgren	Christina Svensson	Kathinka Öberg	
1982	Landskrona	Catarina Lindgren	Lotta Falkenbäck	Anette Olsson	
1983	Stockholm	Catarina Lindgren	Karin Starzmann	Lotta Falkenbäck	
1984	Piteå	Catarina Lindgren	Lotta Falkenbäck	Karin Starzmann	
1985	Helsingborg	Lotta Falkenbäck	Anette Olsson	Karin Starzmann	
1986	Malmö	Lotta Falkenbäck	Anette Olsson	Birgitta Andersson	
1987	Östersund	Hélène Persson	Lotta Falkenbäck	Susanne Seger	
1988	Lidingö	Lotta Falkenbäck	Hélène Persson	Susanne Seger	
1989	Gothenburg	Hélène Persson	Lotta Falkenbäck	Maria Bergqvist	
1990	Örebro	Hélène Persson	Ines Klubal	Jennie Broström	
1991	Västerås	Hélène Persson	Ines Klubal	Karin Starzmann	
1992	Mölndal	Hélène Persson	Ines Klubal	Ann-Marie Söderholm	
1993	Växjö	Ann-Marie Söderholm	Linda Wallmark	Karin Starzmann	
1994	Gothenburg	Linda Wallmark	Helena Grundberg	Linda Pramelius	
1995	Linköping	Helena Grundberg	Jennifer Molin	Klara Bramfeldt	
1996	Helsingborg	Linda Wallmark	Helena Grundberg	Klara Bramfeldt	
1997	Malmö	Helena Grundberg	Klara Bramfeldt	Sara Axelsson	
1998	Vallentuna	Anna Lundström	Klara Bramfeldt	Jennifer Molin	
1999	Örnsköldsvik	Klara Bramfeldt	Anna Lundström	Sara Axelsson	
2000	Upplands Väsby	Klara Bramfeldt	Anna Lundström	Åsa Persson	
2001	Skövde	Klara Bramfeldt	Sara Axelsson	Susanne Gustafsson	
2002	Växjö	Anna Lundström	Klara Bramfeldt	Malin Hållberg-Leuf	
2003	Uddevalla	Åsa Persson	Johanna Götesson	Anna Lundström	
2004	Örebro	Johanna Götesson	Malin Hållberg-Leuf	Marie Skärgård	
2005	Nyköping	Lina Johansson	Malin Hållberg-Leuf	Josephine Ringdahl	
2006	Karlskrona	Malin Hållberg-Leuf	Viktoria Helgesson	Nanna Nilsson	
2007	Borås	Viktoria Helgesson	Lina Johansson	Malin Hållberg-Leuf	
2008	Gothenburg	Viktoria Helgesson	Malin Hållberg-Leuf	Maria Taljegård	
2009	Linköping	Viktoria Helgesson	Linnea Mellgren	Angelica Olsson	
2010	Linköping	Viktoria Helgesson	Joshi Helgesson	Angelica Olsson	
2011	Malmö	Viktoria Helgesson	Joshi Helgesson	Linnea Mellgren	
2012	Malmö	Viktoria Helgesson	Joshi Helgesson	Linnea Mellgren	
2013	Växjö	Joshi Helgesson	Viktoria Helgesson	Isabelle Olsson	
2014	Växjö	Viktoria Helgesson	Joshi Helgesson	Isabelle Olsson	
2015	Västerås	Viktoria Helgesson	Joshi Helgesson	Isabelle Olsson	
2016	Helsingborg	Joshi Helgesson	Isabelle Olsson	Matilda Algotsson	
2017	Malmö	Joshi Helgesson	Matilda Algotsson	Anita Östlund	
2018	Skellefteå	Anita Östlund	Matilda Algotsson	Josefin Taljegård	
2019	Karlskrona	Matilda Algotsson	Smilla Szalkai	Josefin Taljegård	
2020	Ulricehamn	Anita Östlund	Josefin Taljegård	Emelie Ling	
2021	Linköping	Competition cancelled due to the COVID-19 pandemic			
2022	Borlänge	Josefin Taljegård	Isabelle Paulsson	Emma Kivioja	
2023	Borås	Emelie Ling	Josefin Taljegård	Julia Brovall	
2024	Norrköping	Josefin Taljegård	Julia Brovall	Nina Frederiksson	
2025	Västerås	Josefin Taljegård	Julia Brovall	Olivia Philips	
2026	Landskrona	Josefin Taljegård	Anita Östlund	Josefin Brovall	

=== Pairs ===
Senior pairs' event medalists
Year	Location	Gold	Silver	Bronze	Ref.
1912	Gothenburg	Elna Montgomery; Per Thorén	Valborg Lindahl; Nils Rosenius	Helfrid Palm; Agard Palm	
1913	Stockholm	Elly Svensson; Per Thorén	No other competitors		
1914	No competition held				
1915	Stockholm	Helfrid Palm; Agard Palm	Svea Norén; Harald Rooth	Ingeborg Carlsson; Gunnar Rooth	
1916	Stockholm	Helfrid Palm; Agard Palm	No other competitors		
1917	Stockholm	Helfrid Palm; Agard Palm	No other competitors		
1918	Stockholm	Helfrid Palm; Agard Palm	Ragnvi Torslow; Kaj af Ekström	No other competitors	
1919	Stockholm	Helfrid Palm; Agard Palm	Ragnvi Torslow; Kaj af Ekström	No other competitors	
1920	Stockholm	Ragnvi Torslow; Kaj af Ekström	Anna-Maja Rooth; Harald Rooth	Gunnel Slöör; Ch. von Oelrich	
1921	Eskilstuna	Elna Henrikson; Kaj af Ekström	Helfrid Berghagen; Agard Palm	No other competitors	
1922	Stockholm	Helfrid Berghagen; Agard Palm	Elna Henrikson; Kaj af Ekström	Margit Edlund; Anders Palm	
1923	Djursholm	Elna Henrikson; Kaj af Ekström	Margit Edlund; Anders Palm	No other competitors	
1924	Stockholm	Elna Henrikson; Kaj af Ekström	Margit Edlund; Anders Palm	No other competitors	
1925	No competition held				
1926	Eskilstuna	Margit Edlund; Anders Palm	No other competitors		
1927	Södertälje	Anna-Lisa Rydqvist; Einar Törsleff	No other competitors		
1928	Uppsala	Anna-Lisa Rydqvist; Einar Törsleff	No other competitors		
1929	Stockholm	Anna-Lisa Rydqvist; Einar Törsleff	No other competitors		
1930	No competition held				
1931	Stockholm	Anna-Lisa Rydqvist; Einar Törsleff	Dagmar von Kothen; Frederick Ericson	No other competitors	
1932	Stockholm	Anna-Lisa Rydqvist; Einar Törsleff	Dagmar von Kothen; Frederick Ericson	No other competitors	
1933	Stockholm	Anna-Lisa Rydqvist; Einar Törsleff	Margit Josephson; Anders Palm	Dagmar von Kothen; Frederick Ericson	
1934	Stockholm	Margit Josephson; Anders Palm	Hjördis Nordström; Heige Sandeskog	No other competitors	
1935	Stockholm	Margit Josephson; Anders Palm	Dagmar von Kothen; Frederick Ericson	Hjördis Nordström; Heige Sandeskog	
1936	Stockholm	Stina Palme; Stig Stornfelt	Lise Holmberg; Anders Palm	No other competitors	
1937	Stockholm	Stina Palme; Stig Stornfelt	Margit Josephson; Anders Palm	Gunnel Ericson; Bo Mothander	
1938	Stockholm	Stina Palme; Stig Stornfelt	Gunnel Ericson; Bo Mothander	No other competitors	
1939	Stockholm	Stina Palme; Stig Stornfelt	No other competitors		
1940	Stockholm	Britta Råhlén; Bo Mothander	Stina Palme; Stig Stornfelt	Hjördis Sanderskog; Holger Sanderskog	
1941	Stockholm	Britta Råhlén; Bo Mothander	Hjördis Sanderskog; Holger Sanderskog	No other competitors	
1942	Stockholm	Britta Råhlén; Bo Mothander	Hjördis Sanderskog; Holger Sanderskog	No other competitors	
1943	Stockholm	Britta Råhlén; Bo Mothander	Eva Huitmark; Frederick Ericson	Gun Hammarin; Sven Brandelius	
1944	Stockholm	Britta Råhlén; Bo Mothander	Gun Hammarin; Sven Brandelius	Barbro Lejderstam; Hans Lindh	
1945	Gävle	Britta Råhlén; Bo Mothander	Gun Hammarin; Sven Brandelius	Elsa Hartman; Fred Eriksson	
1946	Stockholm	Britta Råhlén; Bo Mothander	Kerstin Wijkman; Harry Berlin	Gun Hammarin; Sven Brandelius	
1947	Stockholm	Kerstin Wijkman; Harry Berlin	Britta Lindmark; Ulf Berendt	Ann-Marie Winting; Sture Höjdén	
1948	Solna	Kerstin Wijkman; Harry Berlin	Ann-Marie Winting; Sture Höidén	Britta Lindmark; Ulf Berendt	
1949	Stockholm	Britta Lindmark; Ulf Berendt	Gertrud Mikhejew; Sture Höidén	No other competitors	
1950	Stockholm	Gertrud Mikhejew; Sture Höidén	No other competitors		
1951	Stockholm	Britta Lindmark; Ulf Berendt	Birgitta Wennström; Sture Höidén	No other competitors	
1952	Rättvik	Britta Lindmark; Ulf Berendt	Berit Andersson; Torgil Rosenberg	No other competitors	
1953	Uppsala	Ulla-Britt Ekman; Ronny Hall	Berit Andersson; Torgil Rosenberg	No other competitors	
1954	Gothenburg	Britta Lindmark; Ulf Berendt	Gun Mothander; Hans Lindh	No other competitors	
1955	Stockholm	Agneta Wale; Kristian Wale	Gun Mothander; Hans Lindh	Mona-Lisa Englund; Ronny Hall	
1956	Södertälje	Agneta Wale; Kristian Wale	Mona-Lisa Englund; Ronny Hall	Gun Eklund; Inge Sterner	
1957	Malmö	Agneta Wale; Kristian Wale	Maud Levin; Inge Sterner	No other competitors	
1958	Skönsberg	Agneta Wale; Kristian Wale	Margareta Ericsson; Staffan Thorsson	Gun Jonsson; Raymond Wiklander	
1959	Västerås	Agneta Wale; Kristian Wale	Margareta Ericsson; Staffan Thorsson	Gun Jonsson; Raymond Wiklander	
1960	Leksand	Agneta Wale; Kristian Wale	Margareta Ericsson; Staffan Thorsson	Gun Jonsson; Raymond Wiklander	
1961	Nyköping	Margareta Ericsson; Staffan Thorson	Margareta Andersson; Christer Eriksson	No other competitors	
1962	Landskrona	Gunilla Lindberg; Gunnar de Shàrengrad	Boel Lögdberg; Christer Eriksson	Gunilla Guggenheim; Inge Sterner	
1963	Östersund	Gunilla Lindberg; Gunnar de Shàrengrad	Boel Lögdberg; Christer Eriksson	Marie Gellermark; Conny Wilbe	
1964	Umeå	Boel Lögdberg; Christer Eriksson	No other competitors		
1965	Stockholm	Marie Gellermark; Conny Wilbe	No other competitors		
1966	Västerås	Marie Gellermark; Conny Wilbe	No other competitors		
1967–74	No pairs competitors				
1975	Sundsvall	Kathinka Öberg; Thomas Öberg	No other competitors		
1976	Helsingborg	Kathinka Öberg; Thomas Öberg	No other competitors		
1977	Stockholm	Kathinka Öberg; Thomas Öberg	No other competitors		
1978–2010	No pairs competitors				
2011	Malmö	Ronja Roll; Gustav Forsgren	No other competitors		
2012	Malmö	Michelle Lundberg; Richard Lundberg	Ronja Roll; Gustav Forsgren	No other competitors	
2013	Växjö	Ronja Roll; Gustav Forsgren	No other competitors		
2014	Växjö	Ronja Roll; Gustav Forsgren	No other competitors		
2015–20	No pairs competitors				
2021	Linköping	Competition cancelled due to the COVID-19 pandemic			
2022	Borlänge	No pairs competitors			
2023	Borås	Greta Crafoord; John Crafoord	No other competitors		
2024	Norrköping	Greta Crafoord; John Crafoord	No other competitors		
2025	Västerås	Greta Crafoord; John Crafoord	No other competitors		
2026	Landskrona	No pairs competitors			

=== Ice dance ===
Senior ice dance event medalists
Year	Location	Gold	Silver	Bronze	Ref.
1980	Helsingborg	Ulla Örnmarker; Thomas Svedberg	Barbro Staake; Bert Persson	No other competitors	
1981	Karlskrona	Ulla Örnmarker; Thomas Svedberg	Barbro Staake; Bert Persson	No other competitors	
1982	Landskrona	Ulla Örnmarker; Thomas Svedberg	Karin Eliasson; Sten-Olof Eliasson	Åsa Agblad; Nils Kleen	
1983	Stockholm	Åsa Agblad; Nils Kleen	Annika Persson; Johan Formgren	Karin Eliasson; Sten-Olof Eliasson	
1984	Norrköping	Åsa Agblad; Christer Tornell	Maria Ström; Owe Ridderstrale	Catharina Bexander; Torben von Huth	
1985	Helsingborg	Åsa Agblad; Christer Tornell	Maria Ström; Owe Ridderstrale	No other competitors	
1986	Malmö	No ice dance competitors			
1987	Östersund	Åsa Agblad; Owe Ridderstråle	Johanna Elfving; Pontus Krantz	No other competitors	
1988	Lidingö	Lillemor Lööf; Rickard Renholm	No other competitors		
1989	Gothenburg	Elin Larsson; Håkan Andersson	No other competitors		
1990	Örebro	No ice dance competitors			
1991	Västerås	Anna-Lena Andersson; Gyula Szombathelyi	Annika Gustafson; Peter Olausson	No other competitors	
1992–2017	No ice dance competitors				
2018	Skellefteå	Malin Malmberg; Thomas Nordahl	No other competitors		
2020	Ulricehamn	No ice dance competitors			
2021	Linköping	Competition cancelled due to the COVID-19 pandemic			
2022–23	No ice dance competitors				
2024	Norrköping	Milla Ruud Reitan; Nikolaj Majorov	Emma Kivioja; Erik Pellnor	No other competitors	
2025	Västerås	Milla Ruud Reitan; Nikolaj Majorov	Emma Kivioja; Erik Pellnor	No other competitors	
2026	Landskrona	Milla Ruud Reitan; Nikolaj Majorov	No other competitors		

== Junior medalists ==
=== Men's singles ===
Junior men's event medalists
Year	Location	Gold	Silver	Bronze	Ref.
1980	Uppsala	Karel Landys	Roger Andersson	Kim Ketelsen	
1981	Landskrona	Roger Andersson	Kim Ketelsen	Mikael Wesslegård	
1982	Örnsköldsvik	Kim Ketelsen	Peter Johansson	Emanuele Ancorini	
1983	Karlstad	Peter Johansson	Emanuele Ancorini	Jaan Wirma	
1984	Norrköping	Emanuele Ancorini	Pär Sörme	Fredrik Rosén	
1985	Solna	Emanuele Ancorini	Fredrik Rosén	Henrik Norin	
1986	Mölndal	Fredrik Rosén	John Augustsson	Jaan Wirma	
1987	Linköping	Emanuele Ancorini	Fredrik Rosén	Niclas Karlsson	
1988	Helsingborg	Niclas Karlsson	John Augustsson	Fredrik Rosén	
1989	Stockholm	Niclas Karlsson	No other competitors		
1990	Uddevalla	No junior men's competitors			
1991	Kungsbacka	Joel Mangs	Tobias Karlsson	Ludvig Mannbro	
1992	Luleå	Ludvig Mannbro	Tobias Karlsson	No other competitors	
1993	Vallentuna	Veli-Pekka Riihinen	Tobias Karlsson	Ludvig Mannbro	
1994	Gothenburg	Filip Stiller	Tommy Bolstad	Nikos Gatos	
1995	Linköping	Kristoffer Berntsson	Filip Stiller	Mikael Olofsson	
1996	Helsingborg	Kristoffer Berntsson	Filip Stiller	Mikael Olofsson	
1997	Malmö	Kristoffer Berntsson	Filip Stiller	Mikael Olofsson	
1998	Vallentuna	Kristoffer Berntsson	Filip Stiller	Mikael Olofsson	
1999	Örnsköldsvik	Kristoffer Berntsson	Mikael Olofsson	Hunor Thurman	
2000	Upplands Väsby	Niklas Hogner	Mikael Olofsson	Martin Johansson	
2001	Skövde	Niklas Hogner	Duran O'Hara Lindblom	Martin Johansson	
2002	Växjö	Niklas Hogner	Kalle Strid	Martin Johansson	
2003	Uddevalla	Niklas Hogner	Adrian Schultheiss	Martin Johansson	
2004	Örebro	Adrian Schultheiss	Justus Strid	Marcus Olofson	
2005	Nyköping	Adrian Schultheiss	Justus Strid	Erik Hannerstam	
2006	Karlskrona	Alexander Majorov	Justus Strid	Erik Hannerstam	
2007	Borås	Alexander Majorov	Anton Truvé	Erik Hannerstam	
2008	Gothenburg	Anton Truvé	Bertil Skeppar	Mathias Andersson	
2009	Linköping	Ondrej Spiegl	Mathias Andersson	Bertil Skeppar	
2010	Linköping	Ondrej Spiegl	Bertil Skeppar	Mathias Andersson	
2011	Malmö	Mathias Andersson	Daniel Neumann	Marcus Björk	
2012	Malmö	Nicky-Leo Obreykov	Marcus Björk	Josef Oscarsson-Eriksson	
2013	Växjö	Nicky-Leo Obreykov	John-Olof Hallman	Marcus Björk	
2014	Växjö	Illya Solomin	Nicky-Leo Obreykov	Trevor Bergqvist	
2015	Västerås	Illya Solomin	Nicky-Leo Obreykov	John-Olof Hallman	
2016	Helsingborg	Nikolaj Majorov	John-Olof Hallman	Mikael Nordebäck	
2017	Malmö	Gabriel Folkesson	Natran Tzagai	Mikael Nordebäck	
2018	Skellefteå	Gabriel Folkesson	Nikolaj Majorov	Andreas Nordebäck	
2019	Karlskrona	Andreas Nordebäck	Daniel Seidel	Casper Johansson	
2020	Ulricehamn	Andreas Nordebäck	Daniel Seidel	Jonathan Egyptson	
2021	Linköping	Competition cancelled due to the COVID-19 pandemic			
2022	Borlänge	Casper Johansson	Jonathan Egyptson	Nels Ireholm	
2023	Borås	Jonathan Egyptson	Casper Johansson	Erik Pellnor	
2024	Norrköping	Elias Sayed	Hugo Bostedt	Adam Bjelke	
2025	Västerås	Hugo Bostedt	Elias Sayed	Albin Samuelsson	
2026	Landskrona	Albin Samuelsson	Tim Nordin	Gabor Body	

=== Women's singles ===
Junior women's event medalists
Year	Location	Gold	Silver	Bronze	Ref.
1980	Uppsala	Ann-Charlotte Andersson	Caroline Naredi	Susanne Lidholm	
1981	Landskrona	Maria Berqvist	Susanne Seger	Anna-Lotta Andréasson	
1982	Örnsköldsvik	Susanne Lidholm	Susanne Seger	Karin Starzmann	
1983	Karlstad	Susanne Seger	Birgitta Andersson	Hélène Persson	
1984	Norrköping	Birgitta Andersson	Ines Klubal	Ann-Marie Söderholm	
1985	Solna	Birgitta Andersson	Ines Klubal	Ann-Marie Söderholm	
1986	Mölndal	Ines Klubal	Ann-Marie Söderholm	Petra Ekdahl	
1987	Linköping	Ines Klubal	Jennie Broström	Petra Ekdahl	
1988	Helsingborg	Ines Klubal	Jennie Broström	Petra Ekdahl	
1989	Stockholm	Ines Klubal	Jennie Broström	Anna-Lena Andersson	
1990	Uddevalla	Linda Wallmark	Johanna Björsell	Sara Axelsson	
1991	Kungsbacka	Linda Wallmark	Anna Rosman	Sara Axelsson	
1992	Luleå	Linda Pramelius	Sara Axelsson	Nancy Mildengren	
1993	Vallentuna	Jennifer Molin	Maria Sjödin	Veronica Gustafsson	
1994	Gothenburg	Therese Johansson	Klara Bramfeldt	Anne-Sofie Kähr	
1995	Linköping	Therese Johansson	Anna Lundström	Anne-Sofie Kähr	
1996	Helsingborg	Anna Lundström	Therese Ståhl	Veronica Stiller	
1997	Malmö	Anna Lundström	Veronica Stiller	Helen Josefsson	
1998	Vallentuna	Åsa Persson	Jessica Söderlind	Lina Nordin	
1999	Örnsköldsvik	Åsa Persson	Jessica Söderlind	Jenny Petersson	
2000	Upplands Väsby	Carina Bierich	Jessica Söderlind	Jenny Petersson	
2001	Skövde	Johanna Götesson	Jessica Söderlind	Jenny Petersson	
2002	Växjö	Johanna Götesson	Marie Skärgård	Jenny Petersson	
2003	Uddevalla	Lina Johansson	Cecilia Bierich	Marie Skärgård	
2004	Örebro	Viktoria Helgesson	Cecilia Bierich	Josephine Ringdahl	
2005	Nyköping	Amanda Nylander	Isabelle Nylander	Viktoria Helgesson	
2006	Karlskrona	Amanda Nylander	Linnea Mellgren	Isabelle Nylander	
2007	Borås	Joshi Helgesson	Linnea Mellgren	Maria Taljegård	
2008	Gothenburg	Joshi Helgesson	Malin Taljegård	Kristine Gustavsson	
2009	Linköping	Joshi Helgesson	Isabelle Olsson	Rebecka Emanuelsson	
2010	Linköping	Isabelle Olsson	Rebecka Emanuelsson	Malin Magnusson	
2011	Malmö	Rebecka Emanuelsson	Isabelle Olsson	Josefin Taljegård	
2012	Malmö	Elin Hallberg	Rebecka Emanuelsson	Josefin Taljegård	
2013	Växjö	Rebecka Emanuelsson	Josefin Taljegård	Felicia Andersson	
2014	Växjö	Matilda Algotsson	Josefin Taljegård	Clara Callne	
2015	Västerås	Matilda Algotsson	Anita Östlund	Josefin Taljegård	
2016	Helsingborg	Anastasia Schneider	Anita Östlund	Cassandra Johansson	
2017	Malmö	Cassandra Johansson	Emma Kivioja	Smilla Szalkai	
2018	Skellefteå	Selma Ihr	Smilla Szalkai	Jelizaveta Kopach	
2019	Karlskrona	Emelie Ling	Emelie Nordqvist	Sigrid Telliskivi	
2020	Ulricehamn	Julia Brovall	Emelie Nordqvist	Emma Kivioja	
2021	Linköping	Competition cancelled due to the COVID-19 pandemic			
2022	Borlänge	Josefin Brovall	Miranda Lundgren	Ellinor Nordqvist	
2023	Borås	Nina Frederiksson	Josefin Brovall	Miranda Lundgren	
2024	Norrköping	Alexandra Ödman	Lilly Almgren-Lidman	Leona Gebara	
2025	Västerås	Lilly Almgren-Lidman	Alexandra Ödman	Alice Westling	
2026	Landskrona	Nora Coppens	Alice Westling	Lilly Almgren-Lidman	

=== Pairs ===
Junior pairs' event medalists
Year	Location	Gold	Silver	Bronze	Ref.
1980–81	No junior pairs competitors				
1982	Örnsköldsvik	Carin Näslund; Kristian Persson	No other competitors		
1983–2002	No junior pairs competitors				
2003	Uddevalla	Angelika Pylkina; Niklas Hogner	No other competitors		
2004	Örebro	Angelika Pylkina; Niklas Hogner	No other competitors		
2005	Nyköping	Angelika Pylkina; Niklas Hogner	No other competitors		
2006	Karlskrona	Angelika Pylkina; Niklas Hogner	No other competitors		
2007–08	No junior pairs competitors				
2009	Linköping	Ronja Roll; Gustav Forsgren	No other competitors		
2010	Linköping	Michelle Lundberg; Richard Lundberg	Ronja Roll; Gustav Forsgren	No other competitors	
2011	Malmö	Michelle Lundberg; Richard Lundberg	No other competitors		
2012	Malmö	Elsa Widen; Alexander Backlund	No other competitors		
2013	Växjö	Elsa Widen; Alexander Backlund	No other competitors		
2014	Växjö	Elsa Widen; Alexander Backlund	No other competitors		
2015–17	No junior pairs competitors				
2018	Skellefteå	Greta Crafoord; John Crafoord	No other competitors		
2019	Karlskrona	No junior pairs competitors			
2020	Ulricehamn	Greta Crafoord; John Crafoord	No other competitors		
2021	Linköping	Competition cancelled due to the COVID-19 pandemic			
No junior pairs competitors since 2020

=== Ice dance ===
Junior ice dance event medalists
Year	Location	Gold	Silver	Bronze	Ref.
1980–82	No junior ice dance competitors				
1983	Stockholm	Maria Åberg; Håkan Persson	Charlotte Jönsson; Pontus Krantz	No other competitors	
1984	Norrköping	Maria Åberg; Pontus Krantz	Lillemor Lööf; Rickard Renholm	No other competitors	
1985	Helsingborg	Johanna Elfving; Pontus Krantz	Lillemor Lööf; Rickard Renholm	Ulla-Stina Johansson; Fredrik Svartling	
1986	Malmö	No junior ice dance competitors			
1987	Östersund	Lillemor Lööf; Rickard Renholm	Ulla-Stina Johansson; Andreas Hein	No other competitors	
1988	Lidingö	Ulla-Stina Johansson; Andreas Hein	Elin Larsson; Håkan Andersson	Annika Gustafson; Peter Olausson	
1989	Gothenburg	Ulla-Stina Johansson; Andreas Hein	Annika Gustafson; Peter Olausson	No other competitors	
1990–2017	No junior ice dance competitors				
2018	Skellefteå	Vendela Bexander; Hugo Linder	No other competitors		
2019–20	No junior ice dance competitors				
2021	Linköping	Competition cancelled due to the COVID-19 pandemic			
2022–24	No junior ice dance competitors				
2025	Västerås	Anna Mackenzie; Wesley Lockwood	Charlotte Chung; Axel Mackenzie	No other competitors	
2026	Landskrona	Charlotte Chung; Axel Mackenzie	Anna Mackenzie; Wesley Lockwood	Rebecka Gamstedt; Filip Nilsson	

== Records ==
Records
Discipline	Most championship titles			
Discipline	Skater(s)	No.	Years	Ref.
Men's singles	Hans Lindh	11	1947–57	
Women's singles	Gunnel Mothander	12	1935–38; 1947–54	
Pairs	Britta Råhlén; Bo Mothander	7	1940–46	
Ice dance	Åsa Agblad; (Note: Åsa Agblad won one championship title while partnered with Nils Kleen (1983), two with Christer Tornell (1984–85), and one with Owe Ridderstrale (1987).)	4	1983–85; 1987	
