= Figure skating at the 1920 Summer Olympics – Ladies' singles =

Figure skating at the Olympics

Ladies' singles figure skating at the Games of the VII Olympiad
- Venue: Palais de Glace d'Anvers
- Date: 25 April 1920
- Competitors: 6 from 4 nations

Medalists
1st place, gold medalist(s)		Magda Julin; Sweden
2nd place, silver medalist(s)		Svea Norén; Sweden
3rd place, bronze medalist(s)		Theresa Weld; United States

The women's individual skating event held as part of the figure skating at the 1920 Summer Olympics. It was the second appearance of the event and the sport, which had previously been held in 1908.

Six skaters from four nations competed. Despite receiving no first place votes from the judges in the women's singles, Magda Julin of Sweden captured the gold on the strength of three second-place ordinals. She was three months pregnant at the time.

Theresa Weld caused a minor controversy by performing jumps such as salchows and loops, the only woman in the event to do any jumps beyond modest hops. She was told that such jumps were not considered suitable for a lady's program and that some judges marked down as a result.

== Results ==
Rank	Name	Nation	CF	FS	Places
1	Magda Julin	Sweden	1	4	12.0
2	Svea Norén	Sweden	2	3	12.5
3	Theresa Weld	United States	5	1	15.5
4	Phyllis Johnson	Great Britain	3	5	18.5
5	Margot Moe	Norway	4	6	22.5
6	Ingrid Gulbrandsen	Norway	6	2	24.0

Referee:

- (Sweden) Victor Lundquist

Judges:

- (Sweden) August Anderberg
- (France) Louis Magnus
- (Belgium) Eudore Lamborelle
- (Norway) Knut Ørn Meinich
- (United Kingdom) Herbert Yglesias

== Sources ==
- Belgium Olympic Committee (1957). Olympic Games Antwerp 1920: Official Report (in French).
- Wudarski, Pawel (1999). "Wyniki Igrzysk Olimpijskich" (in Polish). Archived from the original on 19 June 2007.
