= 1924 World Figure Skating Championships =

Annual figure skating competition held in 1924

- Type: ISU Championship
- Season: 1924
- Location: (United Kingdom) Manchester, UK (men and pairs); Oslo, Norway (ladies)

Champions
- Men's singles: (Sweden) Gillis Grafström
- Ladies' singles: (Austria) Herma Plank-Szabo
- Pairs: (Austria) Helene Engelmann / Alfred Berger
- Previous: 1923 World Championships
- Next: 1925 World Championships

The World Figure Skating Championships is an annual figure skating competition sanctioned by the International Skating Union in which figure skaters compete for the title of World Champion. Men's and pairs' competitions took place from February 26 to 27 in Manchester, United Kingdom. Ladies' competitions took place from February 16 to 17 in Oslo, Norway.

== Medal table ==
* Host nations (Norway, Great Britain)

Rank	Nation	Gold	Silver	Bronze	Total
1	Austria	2	1	1	4
2	Sweden	1	0	1	2
3	Germany	0	1	0	1
3	Great Britain*	0	1	0	1
5	United States	0	0	1	1
Totals (5 entries)		3	3	3	9

== Results ==
=== Men ===
Rank	Name	Places
1	(Sweden) Gillis Grafström	5
2	(Austria) Willy Böckl	10
3	(Austria) Ernst Oppacher	22
4	(United Kingdom) John Page	23
5	(Austria) Ludwig Wrede	23
6	(Austria) Otto Preißecker	26
7	(Norway) Martin Stixrud	31

Judges:

- (Austria) Ludwig Fänner
- (Norway) Reidar Lund
- (Kingdom of Hungary) Jenő Minich
- (United Kingdom) C. L. Wilson
- (United Kingdom) Herbert Yglesias

=== Ladies ===
Rank	Name	Places
1	(Austria) Herma Plank-Szabo	5
2	(Germany) Ellen Brockhöft	12
3	(United States) Beatrix Loughran	16
4	(Austria) Gisela Reichmann	12
5	(Norway) Sonja Henie	22
6	(Norway) Klara Johansen	28
7	(Sweden) Ragnvi Torslow	35

Judges:

- (Austria) Josef Fellner
- (Germany) Fritz Hellmund
- (Norway) Reidar Lund
- (Norway) M. Mikkelsen
- (Norway) Thor B. Poulsen

=== Pairs ===
Rank	Name	Places
1	(Austria) Helene Engelmann / Alfred Berger	5
2	(United Kingdom) Ethel Muckelt / John Page	10
3	(Sweden) Elna Henrikson / Kaj af Ekström	15

Judges:

- (Austria) Ludwig Fänner
- (Norway) Reidar Lund
- (Kingdom of Hungary) Jenő Minich
- (United Kingdom) C. L. Wilson
- (United Kingdom) Herbert Yglesias
