= Catarina Lindgren =

Swedish figure skater, coach, and choreographer

Personal information
- Full name: Margit Catharina Lindgren
- Born: 10 May 1963 (age 63) Piteå, Norrbotten, Sweden

Figure skating career
- Country: Sweden
- Skating club: Piteå Konståkningsklubb
- Retired: 1984

Margit Catharina Lindgren (born 10 May 1963), known as Catarina Lindgren, is a Swedish figure skating coach, choreographer, and former competitor. She is a four-time (1981–1984) Swedish national champion. She represented Sweden at the 1984 Winter Olympics, where she placed 20th.

== Personal life ==
Margit Catharina Lindgren was born on 10 May 1963 in Piteå, Norrbotten. She married American figure skater Tom Dickson in 1986 and their twins, a boy and a girl, were born in the late 1990s. Their son is named Kai. And daughter named Mikaela.

== Career ==
Lindgren became a four-time Swedish national champion in the first half of the 1980s. She was sent to the 1984 Winter Olympics in Sarajevo, where she placed 20th.

After ending her competitive career, Lindgren skated with Ice Capades. She then became a coach and choreographer. As of 2017, she is based at the Broadmoor World Arena in Colorado Springs, Colorado.

Among the students she has trained or choreographed for include:

- (United States) Jeremy Abbott
- (United States) Ryan Bradley
- (United States) Alexe Gilles
- (Norway) Kaja Hanevold
- (Sweden) Joshi Helgesson
- (Sweden) Viktoria Helgesson
- (South Korea) Kim Chae-Hwa
- (South Korea) Kim Yuna
- (Australia) Cheltzie Lee
- (Chinese Taipei) Chaochih Liu
- (United States) Ross Miner
- (United States) Brandon Mroz
- (United States) Mirai Nagasu
- (Sweden) Åsa Persson
- (Sweden) Angelika Pylkina/Niklas Hogner
- (Slovenia) Darja Škrlj
- (United States) Agnes Zawadzki

== Competitive highlights ==
International
| Event | 77–78 | 78–79 | 79–80 | 80–81 | 81–82 | 82–83 | 83–84 |
|---|---|---|---|---|---|---|---|
| Olympics | | | | | | | 20th |
| Worlds | | | | 18th | 19th | 17th | |
| Europeans | | | | 16th | 22nd | 21st | |
| Nordics | | | 3rd | | | | |
| NHK Trophy | | | | 7th | | 5th | |
International: Junior
| Junior Worlds | 20th | 20th | | | | | |
National
| Sweden | | | 2nd | 1st | 1st | 1st | 1st |
