= Illya Solomin =

Swedish figure skater

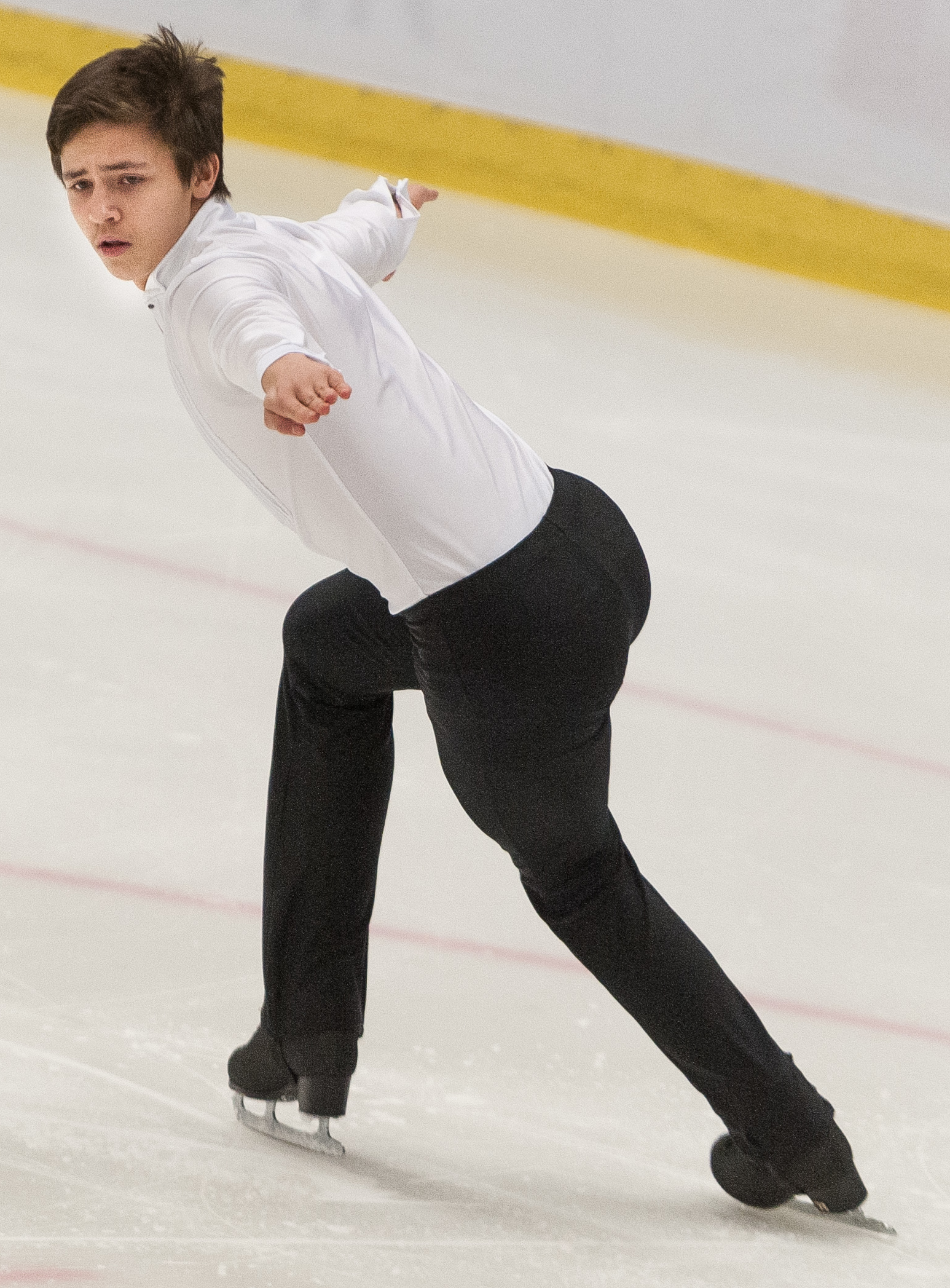
- Illya Solomin in 2015

Personal information
- Born: 7 May 1998 (age 28) Kyiv, Ukraine
- Height: 1.64 m (5 ft 4 1/2 in)

Figure skating career
- Country: Sweden
- Coach: Anna Rechnio, Alexey Fedoseev
- Skating club: SSK Stockholm’s Almänna Skridskoklubb)
- Began skating: 2005
- Retired: August 26, 2021

Illya Solomin (born 7 May 1998) is a Swedish retired figure skater. He is a three-time Swedish national silver medalist and a two-time (2014–15) national junior champion. He reached the free skate at the 2014 World Junior Championships.

== Personal life ==
Solomin was born on 7 May 1998 in Kyiv, Ukraine. He moved to Sweden when he was five and a half years old. He has two sisters, Anna and Alesandra.

== Career ==
=== Early years ===
Solomin began learning to skate in 2005. He competed on the novice level until the end of the 2012–13 season.

=== 2013–14 season ===
Solomin made his junior international debut in October 2013, placing 14th at the ISU Junior Grand Prix (JGP) event in Tallinn, Estonia, and went on to win the Swedish national junior title. He first competed on the senior international level in January 2014, at the European Championships in Budapest, Hungary, but was eliminated after placing 34th in the short program. He reached the final segment at the 2014 World Junior Championships in Sofia, Bulgaria, placing 23rd in the short program, 22nd in the free skate, and 22nd overall.

=== 2014–15 season ===
Solomin competed in two stages of the 2014–15 JGP series, placing 12th in Aichi, Japan, and 11th in Zagreb, Croatia. Competing on the junior level, he won gold at the NRW Trophy and repeated as the Swedish junior champion, before taking bronze at the Toruń Cup. He withdrew from the 2015 World Junior Championships in Tallinn before the start of the event.

=== 2015–16 season ===
In the 2015–16 season, Solomin won the junior silver medal at the Lombardia Trophy and finished tenth at his sole 2015 JGP event, in Zagreb. Competing on the senior level, he took the silver medal at the Swedish Championship, behind Ondrej Spiegl. Solomin was assigned to the 2016 World Junior Championships in Debrecen, Hungary, but withdrew before the start of the competition.

=== Retirement ===
Skate Sweden announced Solomin's retirement in their beginning of the 2021-22 season team update post.

== Programs ==
Season	Short program	Free skating
2019–2020	Spellborn by Sham Stalin; Strength of a Thousand Men by Thomas Bergersen choreo. by Valentin Molotov	Adagio (from Spartacus) by Aram Khachaturian choreo. by Valentin Molotov
2015–2016	The Princess by Parov Stelar	Moulin Rouge!; Hindi Sad Diamonds by Anu Malik; Your Song by Elton John performed by Ewan McGregor
2014–2015	The Princess by Parov Stelar	Gift of Life by Thomas Bergersen; Become a Legend by Piotr Adamski performed by Instrumental Core
2013–2014	Sarabande by George Frideric Handel performed by Myleene Klass	Gift of Life by Thomas Bergersen; Become a Legend by Piotr Adamski performed by Instrumental Core

== Competitive highlights ==
CS: Challenger Series; JGP: Junior Grand Prix

International
Event	13–14	14–15	15–16	17–18	18–19	19–20
Europeans	34th					25th
CS Warsaw Cup						
Nordics			8th	5th	7th	3rd
Tallinn Trophy						7th
Warsaw Cup				11th		
International: Junior
Junior Worlds	22nd	WD	WD			
JGP Croatia		11th	10th			
JGP Estonia	14th					
JGP Japan		12th				
Ice Challenge	4th					
Lombardia			2nd			
Nordics	1st					
NRW Trophy		1st				
Sarajevo Open	2nd					
Toruń Cup		3rd	5th			
National
Swedish Champ.	1st J	1st J	2nd	2nd	5th	2nd
