= Filip Stiller =

Swedish figure skater

Personal information
- Born: 1 June 1982 (age 44) Gothenburg, Sweden
- Height: 1.89 m (6 ft 2 1/2 in)

Figure skating career
- Country: Sweden
- Skating club: GTK Gothenburg
- Retired: 2006

Filip Stiller (born 1 June 1982, in Gothenburg) is a Swedish figure skater who competed in men's singles. He is a four-time Nordic medalist (three silver and one bronze) and a three-time Swedish national champion.

== Programs ==
Season	Short program	Free skating
2005–06	Nothing Else Matters by Metallica; In 3's by Beastie Boys	Beetlejuice by Danny Elfman
2003–05	Harlem Nocturne by Earle Hagen performed by Willy DeVille; Big and Bad by Scotty Morris performed by Big Bad Voodoo Daddy	Evolution - The Meteor by John Powell Hollywood Studio Symphony Orchestra; Some Things by Scotty Morris performed by Big Bad Voodoo Daddy; Hey! Pachuco! (from The Mask) by E. Nichols; Feelings by Albert Morris; I Wanna be Like You by Scotty Morris performed by Big Bad Voodoo Daddy; Feelings by Albert Morris
2002–03	Crouching Tiger, Hidden Dragon by Tan Dun	Austin Powers by George S. Clinton
2001–02	Crouching Tiger, Hidden Dragon by Tan Dun	Second half of season: Austin Powers by George S. Clinton; First half: Summertime; various blues music
2000–01	Rhapsody in Rock V by Robert Wells	Antz by Harry Gregson-Williams
1999–2000	Argentinian Tango	Antz by Harry Gregson-Williams
1998–99	Argentinian Tango	Medley by Robert Wells
1997–98	Sounds of Silence; Nocturne by Secret Garden	Medley by Robert Wells
1996–97	Sounds of Silence; Nocturne by Secret Garden	Batman Forever by Elliot Goldenthal

== Results ==
International
Event	98–99	99–00	00–01	01–02	02–03	03–04	04–05	05–06
Worlds		45th						
Europeans	30th							
Nebelhorn					5th	5th		9th
Universiade					9th		9th	
Nordics		3rd		2nd	2nd		4th	2nd
International: Junior
Junior Worlds	34th		18th					
JGP Czech Rep.		13th						
JGP Mexico			12th					
JGP Poland			10th					
JGP Sweden		13th						
National
Swedish Champ.	1st	2nd	2nd	1st	1st	2nd	2nd	3rd
JGP = Junior Grand Prix
