= Anna Lundström =

Swedish figure skater

Personal information
- Born: 26 August 1980 (age 46) Karlskrona, Sweden
- Height: 1.68 m (5 ft 6 in)

Figure skating career
- Country: Sweden
- Skating club: IFK Osteräkers KK
- Began skating: 1986
- Retired: 2003

Anna Lundström (born 26 August 1980) is a Swedish former competitive figure skater. She is a two-time (1998 and 2002) Swedish national champion and a three-time Nordic medalist (one silver, two bronze). She reached the free skate at four ISU Championships – 1998 Junior Worlds in Saint John, New Brunswick, Canada; 1999 Junior Worlds in Zagreb, Croatia; 2000 Europeans in Vienna, Austria; and 2000 Worlds in Nice, France.

== Programs ==
Season	Short program	Free skating
1999–2000	If I Loved You by Rodgers and Hammerstein	Posablanco; Scott and Fran's Paso Doble (from Strictly Ballroom) by David Hirschfelder, Pogo Pogo Orch.; Spanish Nights; Scott and Fran's Paso Doble

== Results ==
JGP: Junior Series / Junior Grand Prix

International
Event	94–95	95–96	96–97	97–98	98–99	99–00	00–01	01–02	02–03
Worlds				27th		20th			
Europeans						20th			
DSU Cup					2nd				
Finlandia						8th			
Nebelhorn						11th			
Nordics					3rd	2nd		3rd	
International: Junior
Junior Worlds				13th	12th				
JGP Bulgaria				13th	14th				
JGP Germany				17th					
JGP Norway						6th			
JGP Sweden						2nd			
National
Swedish	2nd J.	1st J.	1st J.	1st	2nd	2nd		1st	3rd
J. = Junior level
