= Emanuele Ancorini =

Swedish figure skater

- Born: 18 November 1968 (age 56); Lidingö, Stockholm County, Sweden

Figure skating career
- Country: Sweden

Emanuele Ancorini (born 18 November 1968) is a Swedish actor, director, and former competitive figure skater. He is a two-time (1992–93) Swedish national champion. In 2008, he was a judge on Stjärnor på is, a celebrity skating show on Sweden's TV4.

== Competitive highlights ==
International
Event	81–82	82–83	83–84	84–85	86–87	87–88	88–89	89–90	90–91	91–92	92–93
World Champ.											41st
European Champ.								24th	21st	21st	
National
Swedish Champ.	3rd J	2nd J	1st J	1st J	1st J	3rd	2nd	2nd		1st	1st
J=Junior level
