= Hans Lindh =

Swedish figure skater (1930–1987)

Personal information
- Born: 2 December 1930
- Died: 17 April 1987 (aged 56)

Figure skating career
- Country: Sweden
- Retired: 1957

Hans Lindh (2 December 1930 – 17 April 1987) was a Swedish figure skater. As a single skater, he was an eleven-time Swedish national champion. He also competed in pair skating with Barbro Leidestam and Gun Mothander. Lindh became a coach in 1960, working at Djurgårdens IF and other clubs in the Stockholm region, and founded the Swedish figure skating coaching association. He died in an accident on 17 April 1987.

== Competitive highlights ==
=== Single skating ===
International
Event	46–47	47–48	48–49	49–50	50–51	51–52	52–53	53–54	54–55	55–56	56–57
Nordics			3rd	3rd			3rd	3rd	3rd		2nd
National
Swedish	1st	1st	1st	1st	1st	1st	1st	1st	1st	1st	1st

=== Pair skating with Mothander ===
International
Event	1953–54	1954–55
Nordic Championships		3rd
National
Swedish Championships	2nd	2nd

=== Pair skating with Leidestam ===
National
Event	1943–44
Swedish Championships	3rd
