= Brad Patton (actor) =

Swedish adult film actor and figure skater

- Born: Joel Mangs; August 7, 1972 (age 53); Melbourne, Australia
- Occupations: Pornographic actor, figure skater
- Spouse: Kidd Madonny (m. 2014)
- Partner: Brian Hansen

Brad Patton (born Joel Mangs; August 7, 1972) is an Australian-Swedish former gay pornographic actor and figure skater.

== Early life ==
Mangs was born in Melbourne to an Australian mother and a Swedish-Finnish father. He spent his childhood in Australia, Finland, and Västerås, Sweden.

He was raised in a religious family, and came out as gay at the age of 22.

== Career ==
=== Figure skating ===
Mangs started figure skating at the age of 9, and won medals in Swedish Figure Skating Championships, and in Nordic Figure Skating Championship representing Sweden. After a knee injury put an end to his competitive career, he toured with Disney On Ice as a principal skater, starring as Hades from Hercules, Bagheera from The Jungle Book, and Scar from The Lion King.

In 2007, he appeared (under his real name, Joel Mangs) on the Dutch TV show Dancing on Ice.

He has participated and won medals in figure skating at the Gay Games and the World Outgames. He has also worked as a trainer for young figure skaters in the Netherlands.

=== Adult Film Career ===
Patton made his adult film debut in 2003 in Australia in a film directed by Chi Chi LaRue for Falcon Studios. He worked exclusively for Falcon for two years, mostly as a top, making his bottoming debut in Heaven to Hell (2005). He later also worked for Colt.

Patton announced his retirement from the adult film industry in 2007, but briefly returned for a non-sex cameo in Earthbound: Heaven To Hell 2 (2017).

He had been featured in DNA magazine #77 in 2006. And in 2011, J. C. Adams included him in his list of 100 most famous porn stars, in his book Gay Porn Heroes, in The Superhung category.

In 2016, a hoax photoset of a picture of Mike Pence and a picture of Brad Patton, with the caption "Mike Pence – blast from the gay past.” went viral, purporting to show Pence as a young, gay porn star.

== Awards and accolades ==
=== Figure skating ===
Year	Competition	Division	Medals	Ref.
1991	Swedish Figure Skating Championship	Junior	1st place, gold medalist(s)	
1993	Nordic Figure Skating Championship	Senior	3rd place, bronze medalist(s)	
1994	Swedish Figure Skating Championship	Senior	3rd place, bronze medalist(s)	
1995	Swedish Figure Skating Championship	Senior	3rd place, bronze medalist(s)	
2002	Gay Games		1st place, gold medalist(s)	
2006	World Outgames		2nd place, silver medalist(s)	

== Personal life ==
Patton was based in Amsterdam throughout his adult film career, and continued to reside there after retirement. Gay adult film star Brian Hansen— who was Patton's boyfriend at the time— also retired, and moved to the Netherlands with him, staying there till their breakup.

Patton married DJ Kidd Madonny in 2014, and moved to Miami where his husband lived. The couple own a decor company called 3DX.
