= Elna Henrikson =

Swedish figure skater

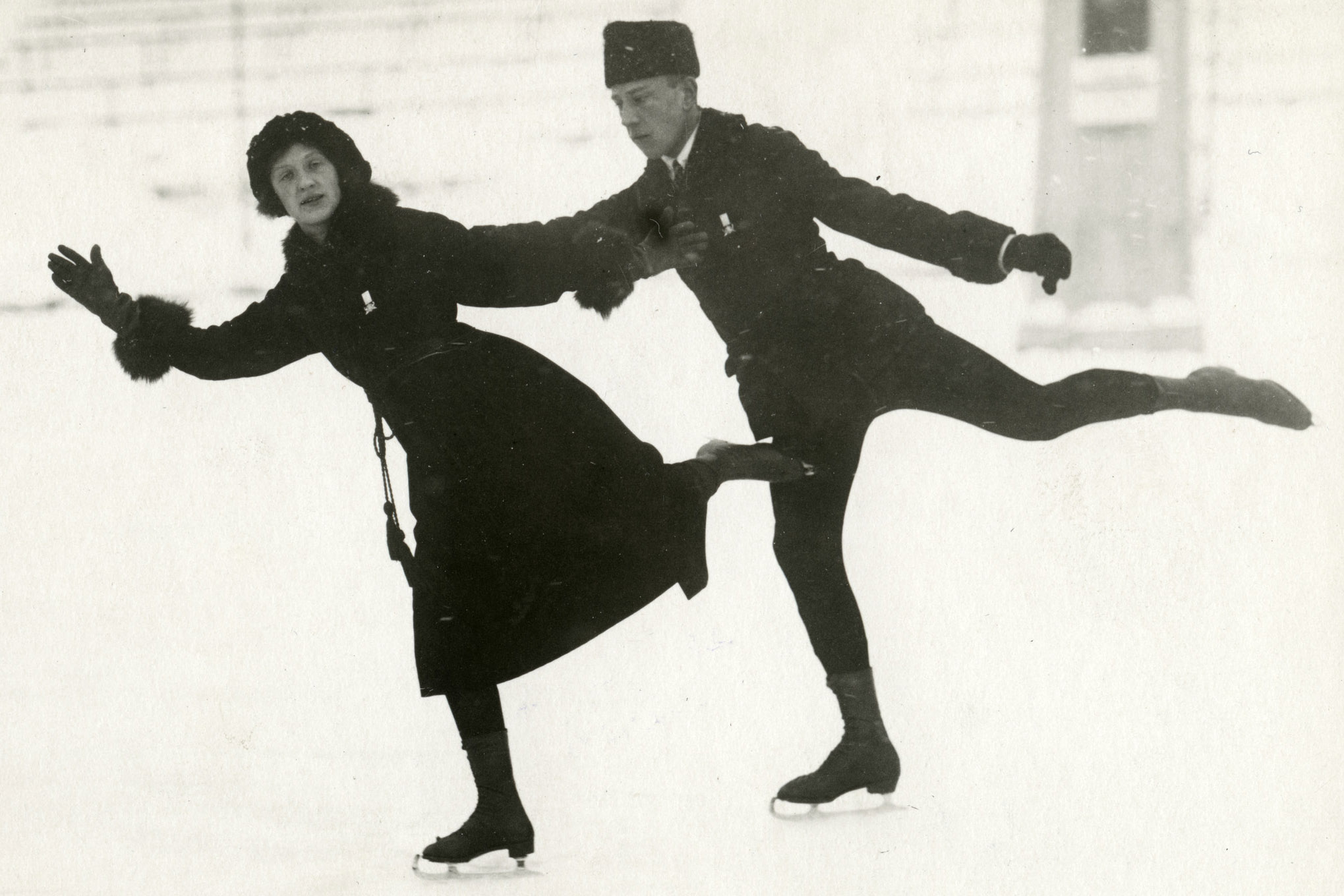
- Henrikson with Ekström at the 1922 Nordic Games

Figure skating career
- Country: Sweden
Medal record
Representing Sweden
Pairs figure skating
World Championships
Bronze medal – third place	1923 Kristiania	Pairs
Bronze medal – third place	1924 Manchester	Pairs

Elna Henrikson was a Swedish figure skater who competed in pair skating.

With partner Kaj af Ekström, she won bronze medals at two World Figure Skating Championships: in 1923 and 1924.

== Competitive highlights ==
Event	1921	1922	1923	1924
World Championships			3rd	3rd
Swedish Championships	1st	2nd	1st	1st
