= Malin Hållberg-Leuf =

Swedish figure skater

Personal information
- Born: 8 April 1979 (age 47) Örnsköldsvik, Sweden

Figure skating career
- Country: Sweden
- Skating club: Örnsköldsviks Konståkningsklubb
- Retired: 2008

Malin Hållberg-Leuf (born 8 April 1979 in Örnsköldsvik) is a Swedish former competitive figure skater. She is the 2006 Swedish national champion.

== Competitive highlights ==
International
Event	2003–04	2004–05	2005–06	2006–07	2007–08
Cup of Nice				10th	
Finlandia Trophy					15th
Nordics		7th	2nd	4th	3rd
Triglav Trophy	6th				
Universiade		14th		12th	
Heiko Fischer				3rd	
Kempen Trophy	2nd				
Montfort Cup			4th		
National
Swedish Champ.	2nd	2nd	1st	3rd	2nd
