= Kaj af Ekström =

Swedish figure skater

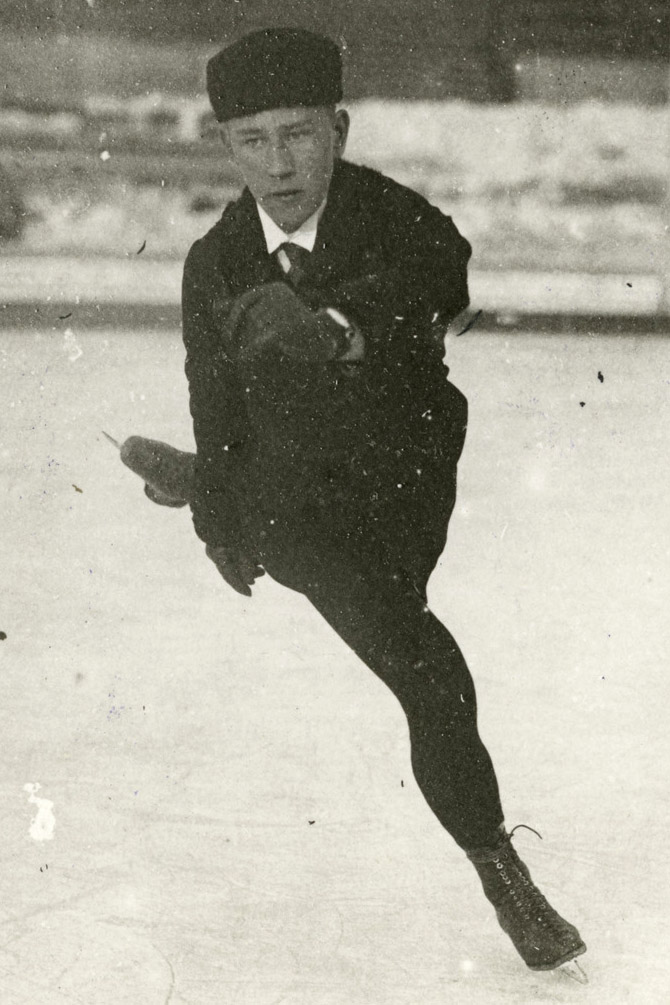
- Ekström in 1919

Figure skating career
- Country: Sweden
Medal record
Representing Sweden
Pairs figure skating
World Championships
Bronze medal – third place	1923 Kristiania	Pairs
Bronze medal – third place	1924 Manchester	Pairs

Kaj af Ekström was a Swedish figure skater who competed both in men's singles and pair skating.

With partner Elna Henrikson, he won bronze medals at two World Figure Skating Championships: in 1923 and 1924.

== Competitive highlights ==
=== Men ===
Event	1920	1921	1922	1923	1924
European Championships				4th	
Swedish Championships	3rd	2nd	3rd	3rd	1st

=== Pairs ===
With Elna Henrikson

Event	1921	1922	1923	1924
World Championships			3rd	3rd
Swedish Championships	1st	2nd	1st	1st

With Ragnvi Torslow

Event	1918	1919	1920
Swedish Championships	2nd	2nd	1st
