= Elna Montgomery =

Swedish figure skater (1885–1981)

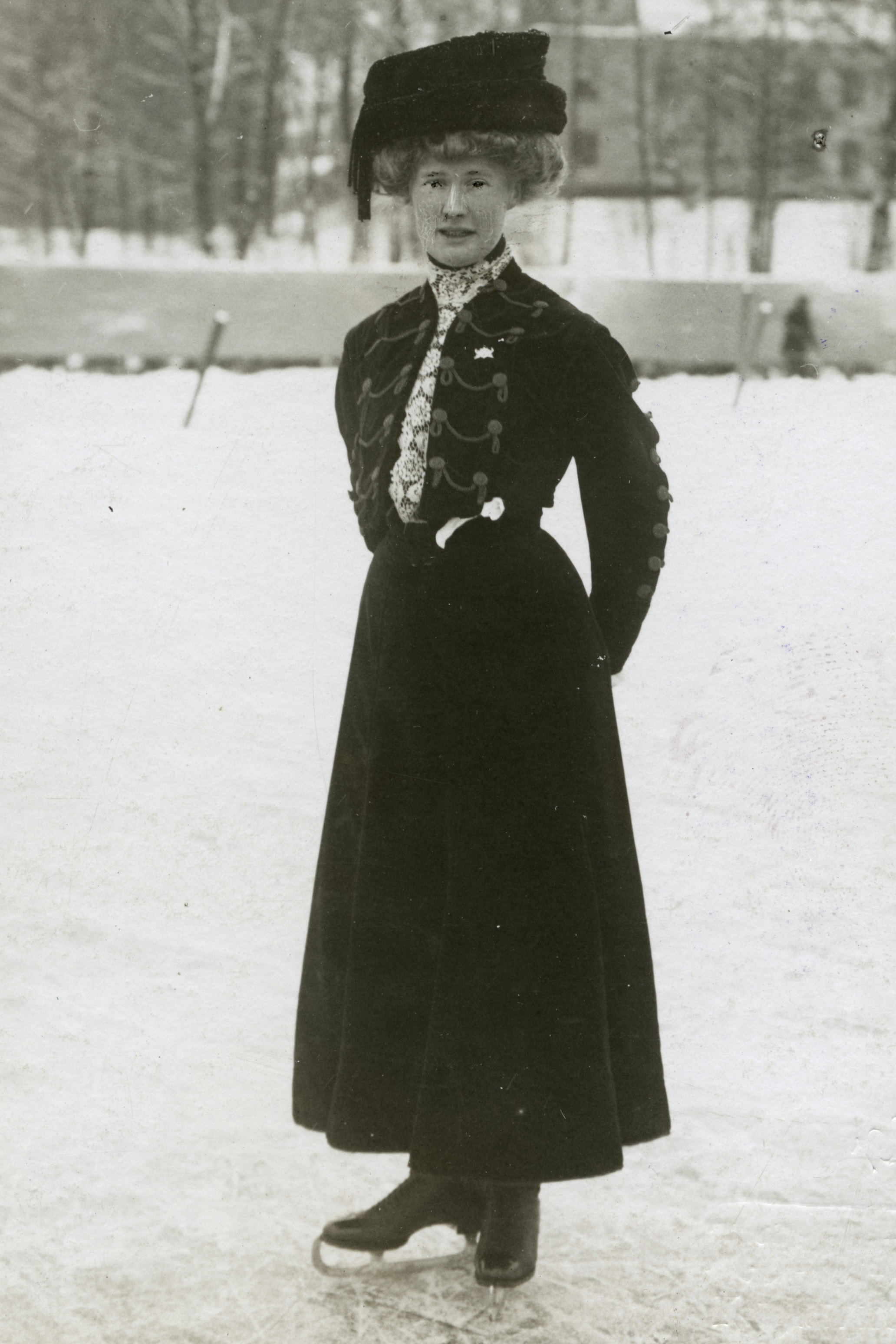
- Montgomery at the 1909 Nordic Games

Personal information
- Born: 23 October 1885 Stockholm, Sweden
- Died: 13 June 1981 (aged 95) Båstad, Sweden

Figure skating career
- Country: Sweden

Elna Charlotta Elvira Montgomery (23 October 1885 – 13 June 1981) was a Swedish figure skater and the 1912 Swedish national champion. She competed at the 1908 Summer Olympics, the first Olympics where figure skating was contested, and finished fourth out of five skaters.

== Career ==
Montgomery primarily competed in single skating; however, she was also the 1912 Swedish pair champion with Per Thorén.

In February 1908, she competed in an international competition held concurrent with the 1908 World Championships in pairs in Saint Petersburg, Russia, where she placed third. Later that year, she competed at the 1908 Summer Olympics and finished 4th out of five skaters. The official report said that she fell on a toe-step, but otherwise skated well, though "her programme did not contain any items of difficulty." The next year, she competed in the Nordic Games and placed third behind Elsa Rendschmidt and Opika von Méray Horváth. In 1912, she won the Swedish Championships, and in 1916, she placed second.

== Personal life ==
In 1918, she married Allan Bäckman, who would later become the Norwegian consul in Malmö.

== Results ==
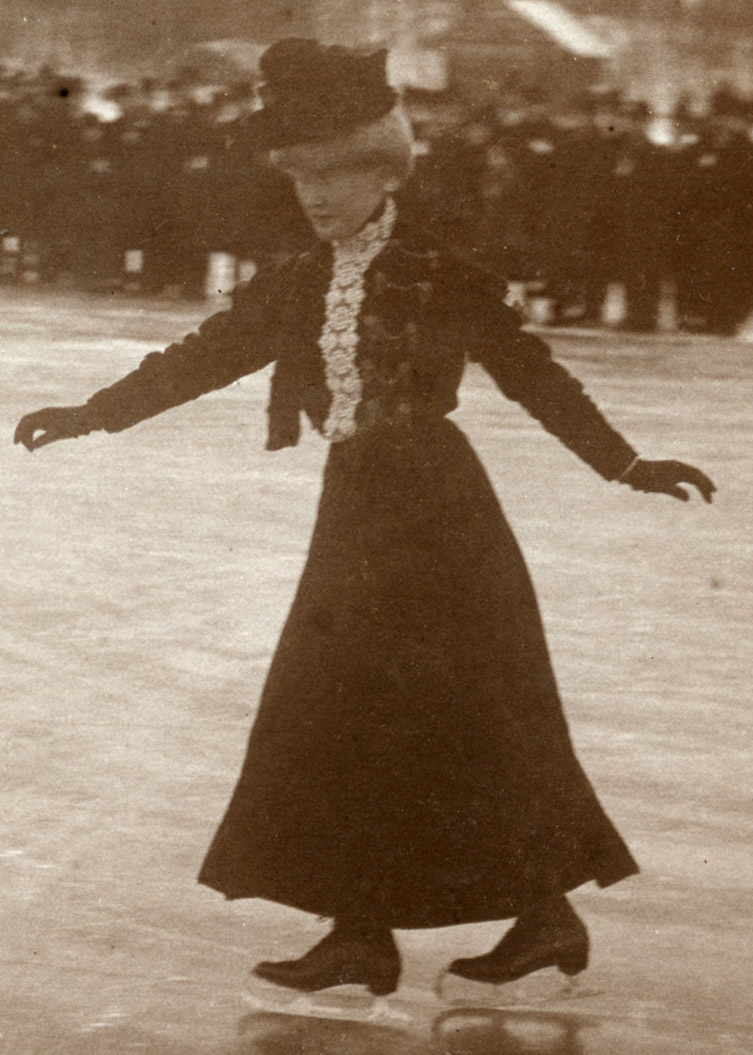
Montgomery performing an exhibition in 1098

=== Single skating ===
Competition placements between the 1908 and 1916 season
| Season | 1908 | 1909 | 1912 | 1916 |
|---|---|---|---|---|
| Summer Olympics | 4th | | | |
| Swedish Championships | | | 1st | 2nd |
| Nordic Games | | 3rd | | |
