= Helena Grundberg =

Swedish figure skater

Personal information
- Full name: Birgitta Helena Grundberg
- Other names: Chiliy
- Born: 26 June 1972 (age 54) Örnsköldsvik, Sweden
- Height: 1.66 m (5 ft 5 1/2 in)

Figure skating career
- Country: Sweden
- Skating club: Konståkarna, Borås
- Retired: 1998

Birgitta Helena Grundberg, later surname: Chiliy (born 26 June 1972) is a Swedish former competitive figure skater. She is the 1995 and 1997 Swedish national champion and competed at the 1998 Winter Olympics in Nagano. She reached the free skate at the 1997 World Championships in Lausanne and 1998 European Championships in Milan.

After retiring from competition, Grundberg performed in ice shows and became the head coach at Viggbyholm IK Konståkning.

== Programs ==
Season	Short program	Free skating
1996–97	Puttin' On the Ritz by Irving Berlin	A Fish Called Wanda by John Du Prez
1995–96	Puttin' On the Ritz by Irving Berlin	

== Competitive highlights ==
International
Event	1993–94	1994–95	1995–96	1996–97	1997–98
Olympics					26th
Worlds			27th	22nd	
Europeans	25th	28th			18th
Karl Schäfer					11th
Nebelhorn					9th
Nordics	3rd	3rd			
Piruetten			6th		
National
Swedish	2nd	1st	2nd	1st	
