= Tobias Karlsson (figure skater) =

Swedish figure skater

Personal information
- Full name: Tobias Karlsson

Figure skating career
- Country: Sweden
- Skating club: Trollhättans KF

Tobias Karlsson is a Swedish figure skater. He is the 1994 Swedish national champion. As a professional skater. He has also worked as a coach. Among his current and former students are Pauline Espegren and Marie Skärgård.

== Results ==
International
| Event | 1993–94 |
|---|---|
| European Championships | 25th |
| World Junior Championships | 21st |
National
| Swedish Championships | 1st |
