= 1923 World Figure Skating Championships =

Annual figure skating competition held in 1923

- Type: ISU Championship
- Season: 1923
- Location: Vienna, Austria (singles); Kristiania, Norway (pairs)

Champions
- Men's singles: (Austria) Fritz Kachler
- Ladies' singles: (Austria) Herma Plank-Szabo
- Pairs: (Finland) Ludowika Jakobsson-Eilers / Walter Jakobsson
- Previous: 1922 World Championships
- Next: 1924 World Championships

The World Figure Skating Championships is an annual figure skating competition sanctioned by the International Skating Union in which figure skaters compete for the title of World Champion. Men's and ladies' competitions took place from January 27 to 28 in Vienna, Austria. Pairs' competition took place on January 21 also in Kristiania, Norway.

== Results ==
=== Men ===
Rank	Name	Places
1	(Austria) Fritz Kachler	7
2	(Austria) Willy Böckl	12
3	(Sweden) Gösta Sandahl	16
4	(Austria) Ernst Oppacher	16
5	(Austria) Ludwig Wrede	25
6	(Germany) Artur Vieregg	29

Judges:

- (United Kingdom) J. H. Clarke
- (Austria) Josef Fellner
- (Austria) Hans Pfeiffer
- (Sweden) O. Sampe
- (Germany) Otto Schöning

=== Ladies ===
Rank	Name	Places
1	(Austria) Herma Plank-Szabo	6
2	(Austria) Gisela Reichmann	12
3	(Sweden) Svea Norén	16
4	(United Kingdom) Ethel Muckelt	16

Judges:

- (United Kingdom) J. H. Clarke
- (Austria) Josef Fellner
- (Austria) Hans Pfeiffer
- (Sweden) Otto Petterson
- (Germany) Otto Schöning

=== Pairs ===
Rank	Name	Places
1	(Finland) Ludowika Jakobsson-Eilers / Walter Jakobsson	6.5
2	(Norway) Alexia Bryn-Schøien / Yngvar Bryn	10.5
3	(Sweden) Elna Henrikson / Kaj af Ekström	14
4	(Norway) Margit Engebretsen / Bjarne Engebretsen	19
5	(Norway) Randi Bakke / Christen Christensen	25

Judges:

- (Sweden) August Anderberg
- (Finland) Sakari Ilmanen
- (Norway) Knut Ørn Meinich
- (Sweden) Per Thorén
- (United Kingdom) Herbert Yglesias
