= Amanda Nylander =

Swedish figure skater

Personal information
- Born: 20 April 1990 (age 36)
- Height: 1.65 m (5 ft 5 in)

Figure skating career
- Country: Sweden
- Began skating: 1998

Amanda Nylander (born 20 April 1990) is a Swedish figure skater. She placed 15th at the 2005 World Junior Championships and 17th at the 2006 World Championships. She started skating as a child, in Älta. Her coach was Marie Olsson. She is the twin sister of Isabelle Nylander, who also competed in figure skating.

Despite being seen as future medal hope in the Olympic Games, Nylander quit figure skating soon after her World Championships success, failing to find the motivation for the practice required for an elite figure skater. She attempted a comeback in 2012.

== Programs ==
Season	Short program	Free skating
2006–2007	Fuga performed by Vanessa-Mae	Harem by Sarah Brightman
2004–2005	Kismet by Bond	Malaguena by Ernesto Lecuona
2003–2004	Kismet by Bond	

== Results ==
International
Event	2003–04	2004–05	2005–06	2006–07	2007–08	2012–13
World Champ.			17th			
International: Junior
World Junior Champ.		15th				
JGP Bulgaria			14th			
JGP France		5th				
JGP Slovakia			18th			
JGP Ukraine		5th				
EYOF		6th J.				
Nordics	6th J.	3rd J.	3rd J.			
Triglav Trophy		3rd J.				
National
Swedish Champ.	4th J.	1st J.	1st J.		7th	WD
J. = Junior level; JGP = Junior Grand Prix; WD = Withdrew
