= Lotta Falkenbäck =

Swedish figure skater

Personal information
- Born: 22 May 1959 (age 67) Tumba, Sweden
- Height: 1.62 m (5 ft 4 in)

Figure skating career
- Country: Sweden
- Retired: 1989

Charlotte "Lotta" Falkenbäck (born 22 May 1959) is a Swedish former competitive figure skater. She is a three-time Swedish national champion. She placed 13th at two European Championships (1985 and 1986) and competed at the 1988 Winter Olympics, placing 21st.

== Competitive highlights ==
International
Event	78–79	79–80	80–81	81–82	82–83	83–84	84–85	85–86	86–87	87–88	88–89
Olympics										21st	
Worlds							19th	23rd		16th	
Europeans							13th	13th		18th	
Skate America									11th		
NHK Trophy											11th
Prague Skate										1st	
Nordics						3rd	1st	1st	1st		
National
Swedish	3rd	3rd		2nd	3rd	2nd	1st	1st	2nd	1st	2nd
WD: Withdrew
