= Klara Bramfeldt =

Swedish figure skater (born 1979)

Personal information
- Born: 20 July 1979 (age 47) Norrköping
- Height: 1.65 m (5 ft 5 in)

Figure skating career
- Country: Sweden
- Skating club: GTK Göteborg
- Began skating: 1983
- Retired: 2002

Klara Bramfeldt (born 20 July 1979) is a Swedish former competitive figure skater. She is a three-time (1999–2001) Swedish national champion and three-time Nordic bronze medalist. She reached the free skate at three ISU Championships – the 1996 Junior Worlds in Brisbane, 1997 Junior Worlds in Seoul, and 1999 Europeans in Prague. She placed 33rd in her only appearance at the World Figure Skating Championships, in 1999.

== Programs ==
Season	Short program	Free skating
2000–01	Summertime by George Gershwin	Spanish Guitar

== Results ==
International
Event	95–96	96–97	97–98	98–99	99–00	00–01	01–02
Worlds				33rd			
Europeans	29th	25th		22nd		25th	
Karl Schäfer				10th	9th		
Nebelhorn		15th	10th				
Nordics			3rd	4th	3rd	3rd	
Piruetten				8th			
Skate Israel					9th		
International: Junior
Junior Worlds	21st	20th					
National
Swedish Champ.	3rd	2nd	2nd	1st	1st	1st	2nd
