= Lars Åkesson =

Swedish figure skater

Personal information
- Full name: Lars Arne Åkesson
- Born: 26 February 1963 (age 63) Malmö, Sweden
- Height: 1.80 m (5 ft 11 in)

Figure skating career
- Country: Sweden
- Retired: 1986

Lars Arne Åkesson (born 26 February 1963) is a Swedish former competitive figure skater. He is a six-time Swedish national champion and two-time Nordic champion. He competed at four World Championships, six European Championships, and the 1984 Winter Olympics in Sarajevo. At the Olympics, he placed 13th in compulsory figures, 15th in the short program, 18th in the free skate, and 17th overall. His best ISU Championship result was 9th, obtained at the 1985 Europeans in Gothenburg.

== Competitive highlights ==
International
Event	74–75	76–77	77–78	78–79	79–80	80–81	81–82	82–83	83–84	84–85	85–86
Olympics									17th		
Worlds							19th	15th		16th	17th
Europeans						13th	17th	11th	13th	9th	10th
Skate America								9th			
Nordics										1st	1st
International: Junior
Junior Worlds		10th	12th	9th							
National
Swedish		3rd	3rd	3rd	3rd	1st	1st	1st	1st	1st	1st
Swedish Jr.	1st		1st	1st							
