= Lise-Lotte Öberg =

Swedish figure skater

Personal information
- Other names: Lise-Lotte Kinding
- Born: Sweden

Figure skating career
- Country: Sweden
- Skating club: The Royal Glenora Club
- Retired: 1976

Lise-Lotte Öberg, married surname: Kinding, is a Swedish former competitive figure skater. She is a three-time (1971–73) Nordic champion and a four-time (1973–76) Swedish national champion, representing Malmbergets AIF (1968–70), GF Idrott Landskrona (1971), Göteborgs KK (1972–73), and Isblommans KK (1974–76).

She began coaching in 1976 and joined The Royal Glenora Club in Edmonton, Alberta, Canada in 1998. She and her husband, Swedish hockey coach Björn Kinding, have two daughters, Mikaela and Tiffany.

== Competitive highlights ==
International
Event	68–69	69–70	70–71	71–72	72–73	73–74	74–75	75–76
Worlds					20th			21st
Europeans					15th	16th	21st	
Nordics			1st	1st	1st		2nd	
Prague Skate						7th	7th	
National
Swedish	2nd J.	1st J.	2nd	2nd	1st	1st	1st	1st
J. = Junior level
