= Valborg Lindahl =

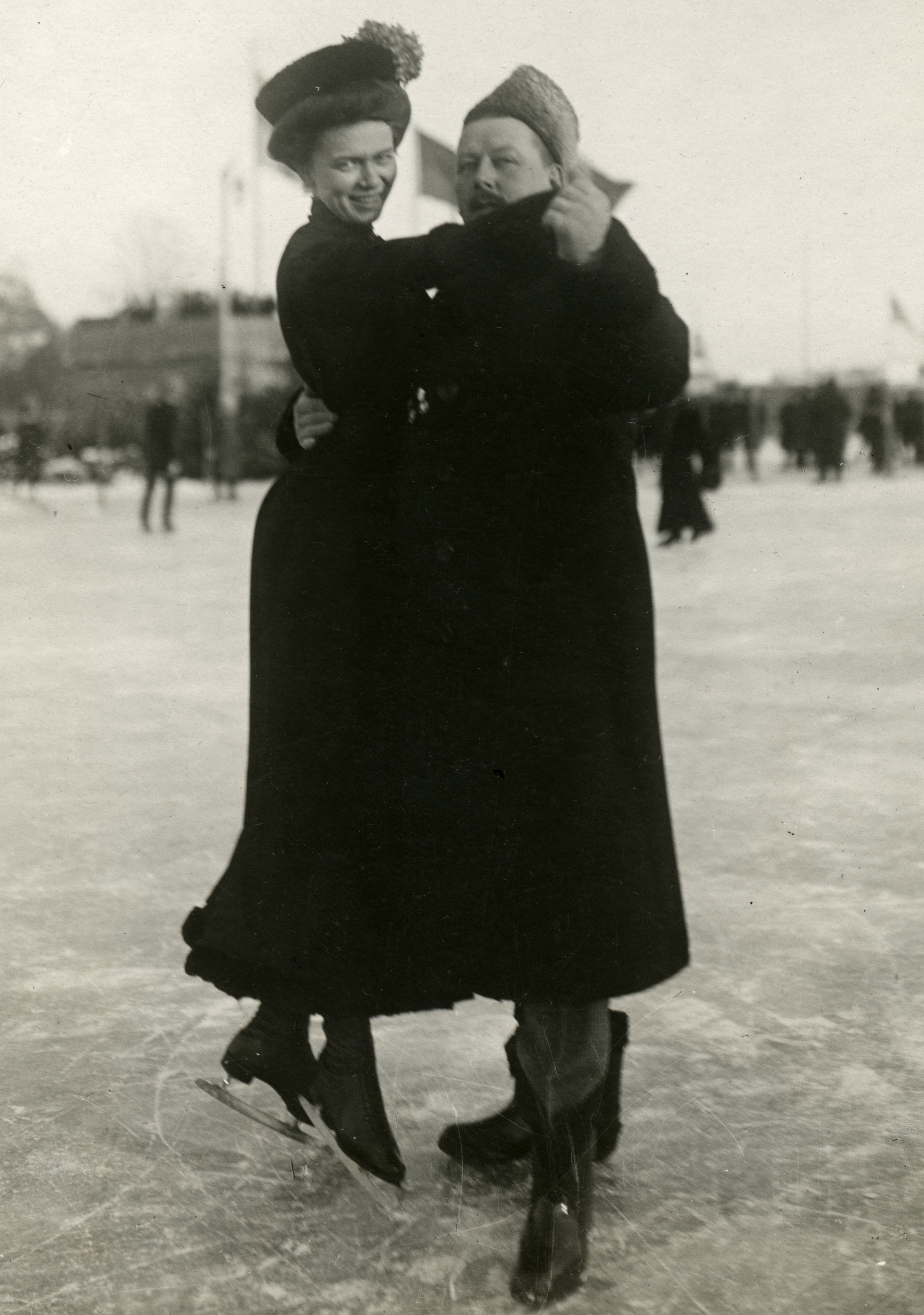

Figure skating career
- Country: Sweden
Medal record
Representing Sweden
Figure skating: Pairs
World Championships
Silver medal – second place	1909 Stockholm	Pairs

Valborg Lindahl was a Swedish figure skater who competed both in ladies' singles and in pair skating.

With partner Nils Rosenius, she won the silver medal at the 1909 World Figure Skating Championships.

== Competitive highlights ==
=== Ladies ===
Event	1909	1910
Swedish Championships	1st	3rd

=== Pairs ===
With Nils Rosenius

Event	1909	1910	1911	1912
World Championships	2nd			
Swedish Championships	Not held			2nd
