= Bror Meyer =

Swedish figure skater

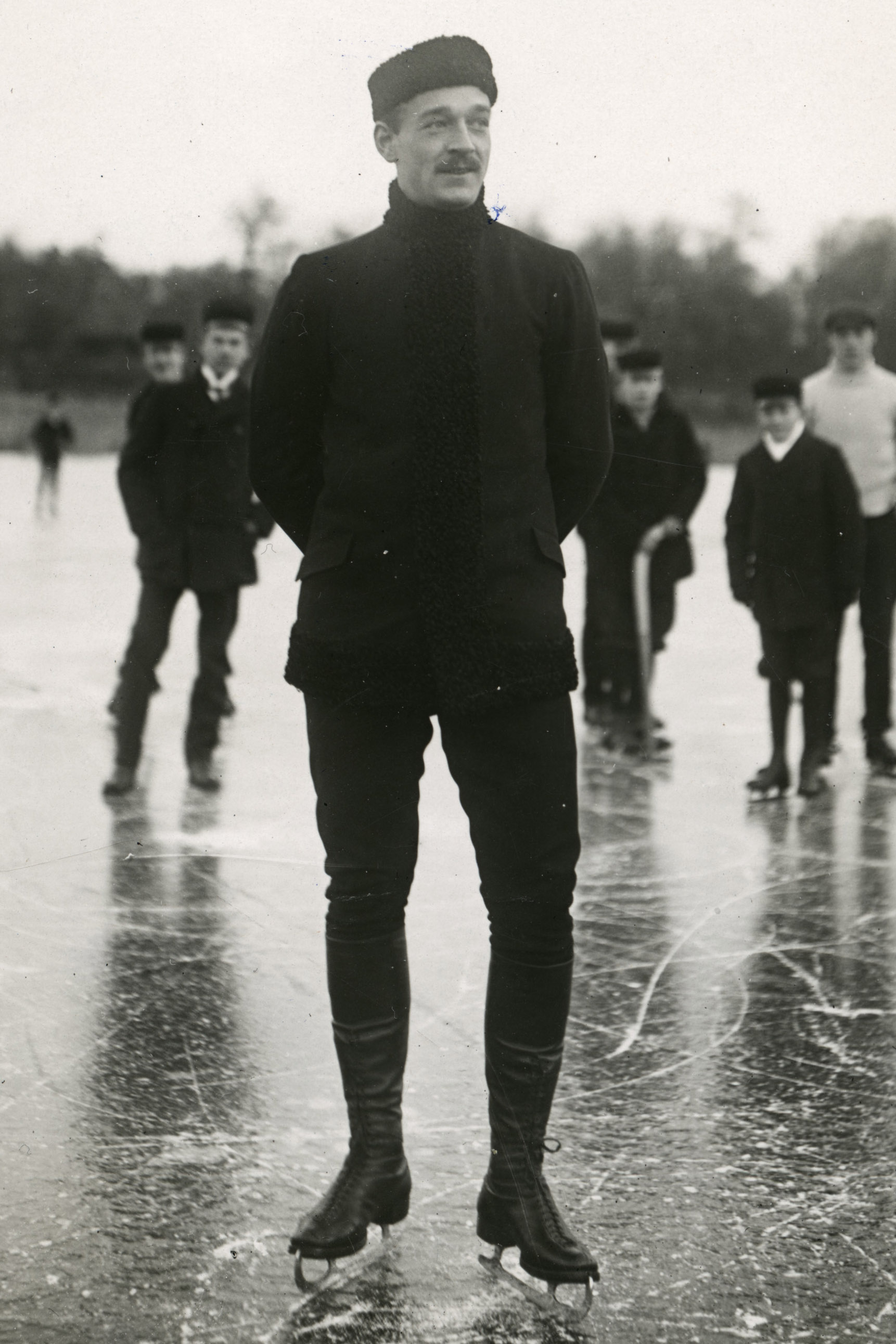
- Meyer in 1908

Personal information
- Born: 12 February 1885 Stockholm
- Died: June 1956 Stockholm

Figure skating career
- Country: Sweden

Bror Meyer (1885–1956) was a Swedish figure skater. In 1906, he won the Swedish national title, placed fourth at the European Championships in Davos, and won the bronze medal at the World Championships in Munich. His manual, Skating with Bror Meyer, was published in 1921.

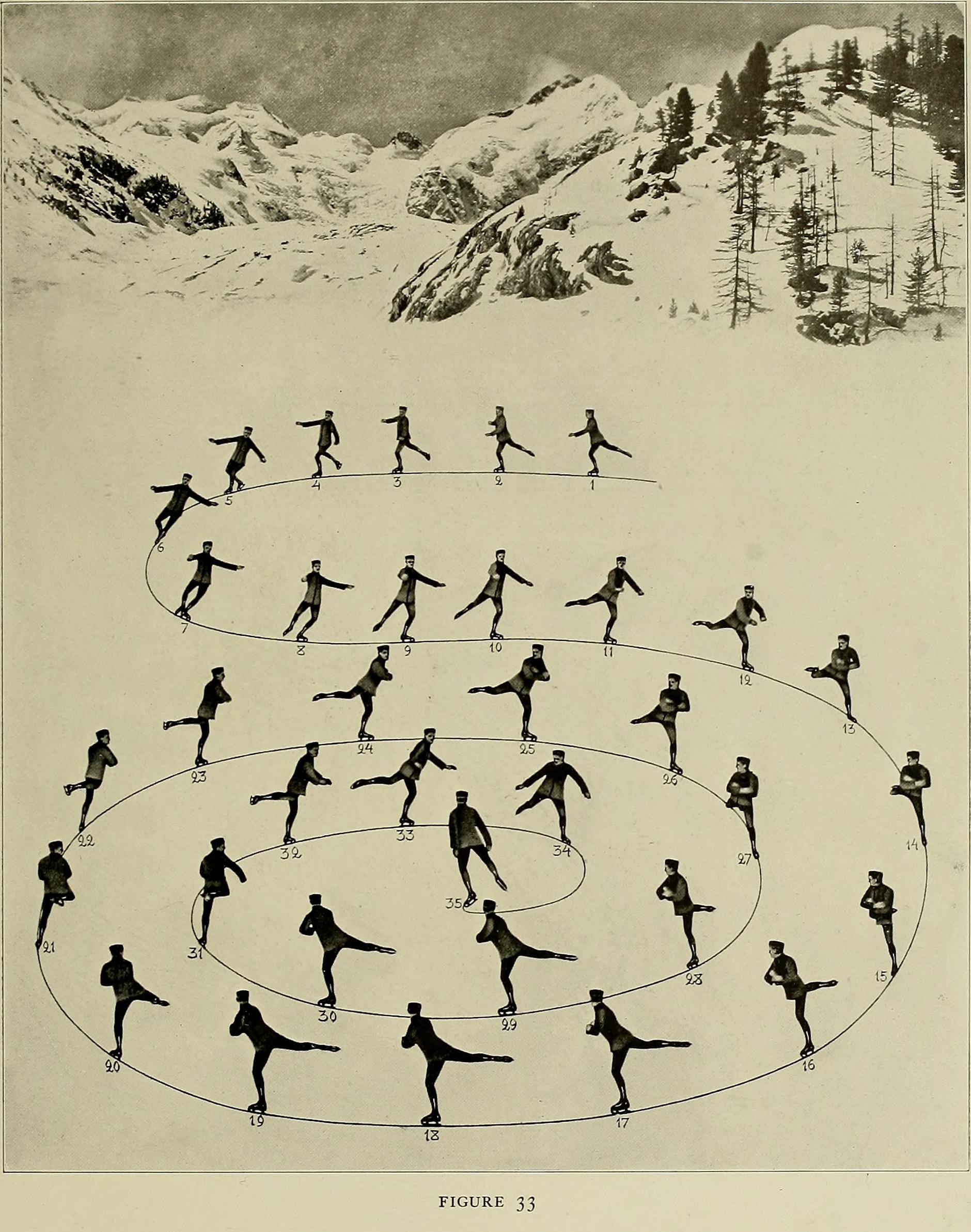
A diagram from Skating with Bror Meyer

== Competitive highlights ==
International
Event	1904	1905	1906
World Championships			3rd
European Championships			4th
National
Swedish Championships	3rd	2nd	1st
