= Ally Lundström =

Swedish figure skater

Personal information
- Other names: Alice Lundström; Ally Flodström
- Born: 15 November 1935 (age 90) Söderhamn, Gävleborg County, Sweden

Figure skating career
- Country: Sweden
- Skating club: Stockholms ASK; Luleå SK

Alice "Ally" Lundström or Flodström (born 15 November 1935) is a Swedish former competitive figure skater. She is the 1957 Nordic champion and a two-time Swedish national champion (1956–57). She represented Sweden at the 1956 Winter Olympics in Cortina d'Ampezzo.

As a junior, Lundström was a member of Luleå SK. During her senior career, her skating club was Stockholms ASK.

== Competitive highlights ==
International
Event	50–51	52–53	53–54	54–55	55–56	56–57
Winter Olympics					19th	
World Champ.			18th			
Nordic Champ.			3rd	3rd		1st
National
Swedish Champ.	1st J	3rd	3rd	2nd	1st	1st
J = Junior level
