= Duran O'Hara Lindblom =

Swedish figure skater

Personal information
- Full name: Duran O'Hara Lindblom
- Born: 21 April 1983 (age 43) Trollhättan, Sweden
- Height: 1.78 m (5 ft 10 in)

Figure skating career
- Country: Sweden
- Coach: Helena Lindblom
- Skating club: Stenungsunds Konstäkingsklubb

Duran O'Hara Lindblom (born 21 April 1983 in Trollhättan) is a Swedish figure skater. He is the 2003 Swedish silver medalist and 2004 and 2005 bronze medalist.
