= Nils Rosenius =

Swedish figure skater

Figure skating career
- Country: Sweden
Medal record
Representing Sweden
Figure skating: Pairs
World Championships
Silver medal – second place	1909 Stockholm	Pairs

Nils Rosenius was a Swedish figure skater who competed in pair skating. With partner Valborg Lindahl, he won the silver medal at the 1909 World Figure Skating Championships.

== Competitive highlights ==
With Valborg Lindahl

Event	1909	1910	1911	1912
World Championships	2nd			
Swedish Championships	Not held			2nd
