= Isabelle Nylander =

Swedish figure skater

Personal information
- Born: 20 April 1990 (age 36) Stockholm, Sweden
- Height: 1.66 m (5 ft 5 1/2 in)

Figure skating career
- Country: Sweden
- Skating club: Älta Skating Club
- Began skating: 1999
- Retired: 2007

Isabelle Nylander (born 20 April 1990 in Stockholm) is a Swedish former competitive figure skater. Coached by Marie Olsson, she competed twice at the World Junior Championships, in 2005 and 2006. She is the twin sister of Amanda Nylander, who also competed in figure skating.

== Programs ==
| Season | Short program | Free skating |
|---|---|---|
| 2006–2007 | Legends of the Fall by James Horner | Concierto de Aranjuez by Joaquín Rodrigo |
| 2004–2005 | Quidam by Benoît Jutras | The Firebird by Igor Stravinsky |

== Results ==
International
| Event | 2003–04 | 2004–05 | 2005–06 | 2006–07 |
|---|---|---|---|---|
| World Junior Champ. | | 18th | 19th | |
| JGP France | | 6th | | |
| JGP Norway | | | | 11th |
| JGP Ukraine | | 17th | | |
| Triglav Trophy | | 10th J. | | |
| Nordics | | | 1st J. | 4th J. |
National
| Swedish Junior Champ. | 9th | 2nd | 3rd | |
J. = Junior level; JGP = Junior Grand Prix
