= Raymond Wiklander =

Swedish figure skater

Figure skating career
- Country: Sweden
- Retired: 1964

Raymond Wiklander is a Swedish former figure skater. Competing in single skating, he won five Swedish national titles and four Nordic bronze medals. He also competed in pair skating. Following a junior-level partnership with Britt-Louis Staffrin, he teamed up with Gun Jonsson and won four consecutive Swedish national senior bronze medals.

== Competitive highlights ==
=== Single skating ===
International
Event	54–55	56–57	57–58	58–59	59–60	60–61	61–62	62–63	63–64
European Champ.					20th				
Nordic Champ.					3rd		3rd	3rd	3rd
National
Swedish Champ.	2nd J.	1st J.	2nd	1st	1st	1st	1st	1st	2nd
J. = Junior level

=== Pair skating with Jonsson ===
National
Event	1957–58	1958–59	1959–60	1960–61
Swedish Championships	3rd	3rd	3rd	3rd

=== Pair skating with Staffrin ===
National
Event	1956–57
Swedish Championships	1st J.
J. = Junior level
