= Bo Mothander =

Swedish figure skater

Figure skating career
- Country: Sweden
- Retired: 1946

Bo Mothander was a Swedish figure skater. Competing in single skating, he was a ten-time Swedish national champion, the 1946 Nordic champion, and placed 6th at the 1939 European Championships in Davos, Switzerland. He also competed in pair skating with Gun Ericson and Britta Råhlén. Råhlén/Mothander won seven consecutive national titles. In 1943, the pair had traveled to Berlin to perform at the Sportpalast when the city was bombed. They were not injured. Mothander competed in singles and pairs until 1946.

== Competitive highlights ==
=== Single skating ===
International
Event	36–37	37–38	38–39	39–40	40–41	41–42	42–43	43–44	44–45	45–46
Europeans			6th							
Nordics										1st
National
Swedish	1st	1st	1st	1st	1st	1st	1st	1st	1st	1st

=== Pair skating with Råhlén ===
International
Event	39–40	40–41	41–42	42–43	43–44	44–45	45–46
Nordics							1st
National
Swedish	1st	1st	1st	1st	1st	1st	1st

=== Pair skating with Ericson ===
National
Event	1937–38
Swedish Championships	2nd
