= Magda Julin =

Swedish figure skater (1894–1990)

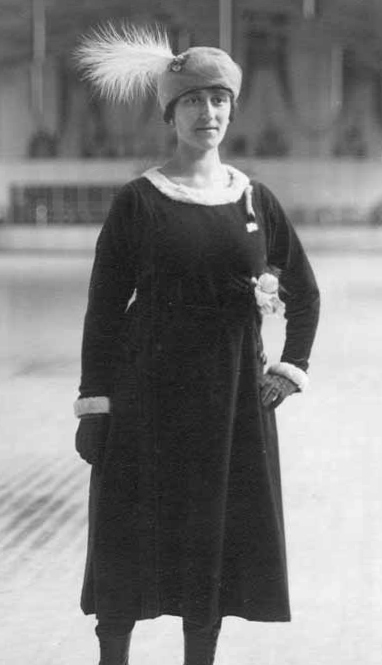
- Julin at the 1920 Olympics

Personal information
- Full name: Magda Henriette Maria Julin
- Other names: Magda Mauroy
- Born: 24 July 1894 Vichy, France
- Died: 21 December 1990 (aged 96) Stockholm, Sweden

Figure skating career
- Country: Sweden
Medal record
Representing Sweden
Olympic Games
Gold medal – first place	1920 Antwerp	Singles

Magda Henriette Maria Julin (née Mauroy; 24 July 1894 – 21 December 1990) was a Swedish figure skater who competed in ladies' singles. She was the 1920 Olympic champion, a two-time Nordic champion, and a three-time Swedish national champion. She was four months pregnant at the 1920 Olympics.

== Personal life ==
Magda Henriette Maria Julin was born in Vichy, where her father ran a physiotherapy institute, which sparked her interest in sport at a young age. The family moved to Sweden when she was 7 years old.

She married a sea captain, Per Johan Emil Julin, shortly before the 1920 Summer Olympics. She had a son with him. He died in 1922. She remarried his younger brother, Fredrik Emanuel Julin, in 1925 and had a second son with him.

After her competitive career, she worked as a waitress. In 1955, she opened her own café and later a restaurant. She died in 1990 in Nacka.

== Career ==
Julin joined the Stockholm club Stockholms Allmänna Skridskoklubb in 1908. She won her first Swedish title three years later in 1911. She would go on to win two more national titles (1916, 1918) and four national silver medals (1912, 1913, 1915, 1917). Three of those silver medals were won behind Svea Norén. The two of them were the two best Swedish women's skaters at the time, and they trained and often competed together. Julin's strength was considered to be compulsory figures, with her free skating routines being simpler.

Julin competed at her only World Championships in 1913, where she placed 6th. In 1917, she won the women's figure skating event at the Nordic Games ahead of Norén.

At the 1920 Olympics, Julin competed four months pregnant; at one point, she fell and was scared she had hurt her unborn child, but he was unharmed. She won the Olympic title, again ahead of Norén. Unusually, none of the judges ranked her first overall, although three did in the compulsory figures segment of the competition. She originally planned to skate her free skate to The Blue Danube, but she was forced to change it due to anti-German sentiment.

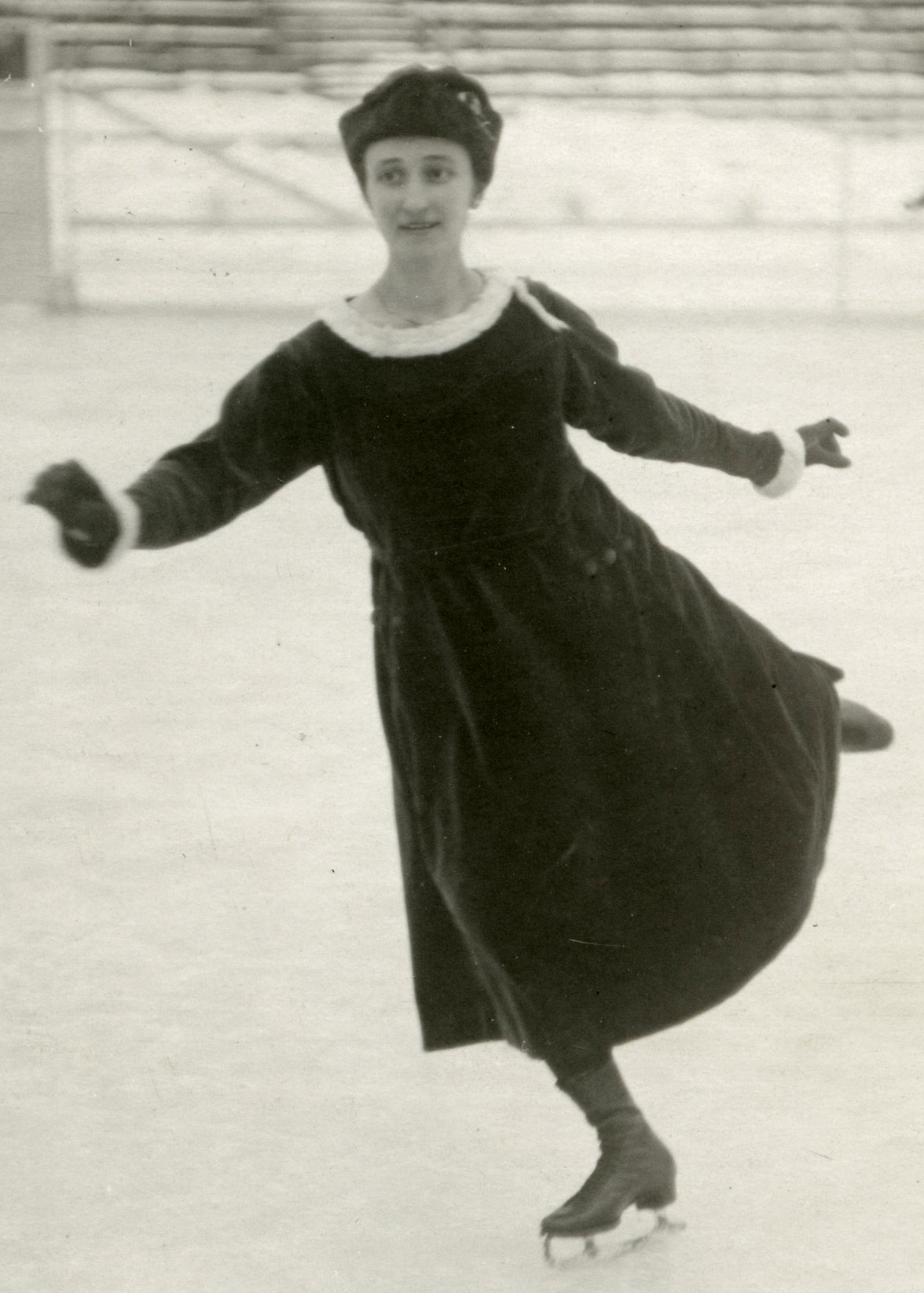
Julin in 1921

Julin wished to continue competing and hoped to do so at the 1924 Winter Olympics. However, the Swedish Figure Skating Federation banned her from official competitions, something Julin was still bitter about when she first spoke publicly about it decades later in 1988.

Julin remained active in skating after the end of her competitive career. In 1985, she skated a short time on a rink in Kungsträdgården in skates that had been donated by Ulrich Salchow. She was a guest of honor at the 75th anniversary celebration of the Swedish Olympic Committee. In 1990, at age 95, she was a guest at the opening of a rink in Östersund.

== Results ==
International
Event	1911	1912	1913	1914	1915	1916	1917	1918	1919	1920	1921
Olympics										1st	
World Champ.			6th								
Nordic Champ.									1st		1st
Nordic Games							1st				
National
Swedish Champ.	1st	2nd	2nd		2nd	1st	2nd	1st			
