= Gisela Reichmann =

Austrian figure skater

Figure skating career
- Country: Austria
Medal record
Representing Austria
Ladies' figure skating
World Championships
Silver medal – second place	1923 Vienna	Ladies

Gisela Reichmann was an Austrian figure skater who competed in ladies' singles.

She won the silver medal in ladies' single skating at the 1923 World Figure Skating Championships.

== Competitive highlights ==
Event	1913	1914	1915	1916	1917	1918	1919	1920	1921	1922	1923	1924
World Championships		5th									2nd	4th
Austrian Championships	1st	1st		2nd	1st	1st				2nd	2nd	
