= Svea Norén =

Swedish figure skater (1895–1985)

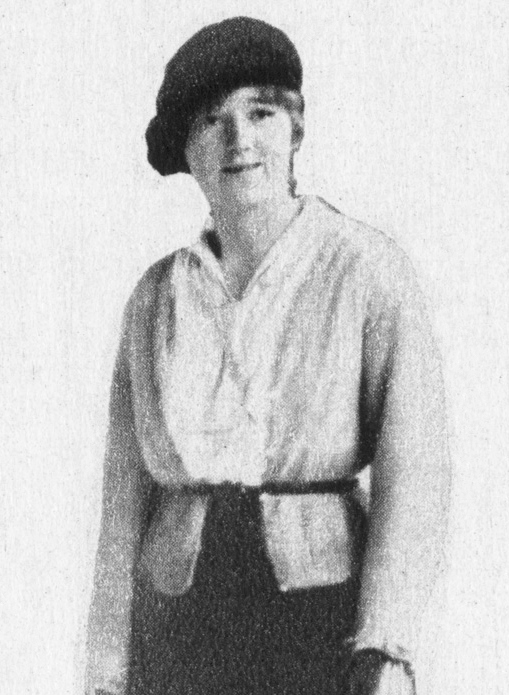

Personal information
- Born: 5 October 1895 Stockholm, Sweden
- Died: 9 May 1985 (aged 89) Lidingö, Stockholm, Sweden

Figure skating career
- Country: Sweden
- Skating club: SASK, Stockholm
Medal record
Representing Sweden
Figure skating
Olympic Games
Silver medal – second place	1920 Antwerp	Ladies' singles
World Championships
Bronze medal – third place	1923 Vienna	Ladies' singles
Silver medal – second place	1922 Davos	Ladies' singles
Bronze medal – third place	1913 Stockholm	Ladies' singles

Svea Placida Mariana Norén (5 October 1895 – 9 May 1985) was a Swedish figure skater. She won the silver medal in the ladies' singles event at the 1920 Summer Olympics behind fellow Swede Magda Julin. She was a three-time medalist at the World Figure Skating Championships: she won the bronze in 1913 and 1923, and the silver in 1922. She was also a four-time Swedish national champion.

== Biography ==
Norén was born in Stockholm on 5 October 1895 to an unknown mother, and she was adopted by the Norén family. By age 12, she was a member of the Stockholm skating club, SASK.

She made her debut at the Swedish Figure Skating Championships in 1910, where she came in second. Two years later, she won bronze; after this, she would win four national titles in alternating years (1913, 1915, 1917, and 1919). In 1915, she also competed in pair skating with Harald Rooth and won the silver medal.

Norén and Magda Julin were the two best Swedish women's skaters at the time, and they trained and often competed together; Norén was considered to be better in free skating. In 1923, in a history of SASK for its 30th anniversary, Norén was evaluated as having difficulties with her health and with her nerves at competitions, and having good compulsory figures in practice but not always in competition.

Norén began to compete internationally in 1911, she when won a bronze medal at a competition in Berlin. In 1913, she competed at her first World Championships, where she won the bronze medal. The World Championships were interrupted due to the outbreak of the World War I, but she competed at the Nordic Games during the war in 1917. She came second behind Julin.

She competed at the 1920 Olympics, where she placed second and won the silver medal behind Julin. There was a mistake made in calculating the scores for the bronze medalist, Theresa Weld, and the correct score would have put her above Norén in second place; however, no complaint was filed, and the original results stood.

In 1922, she competed at her second World Championships when they resumed after the war. There Norén won silver behind Herma Szabo in a field of only three women. The next year, she competed at the 1923 World Championships and won the bronze medal. Although she was entered in the 1924 Winter Olympics, she ultimately did not compete there.

Norén married in 1929 and had one son, and she lived in Lidingö until her death in 1985.

== Results ==
Event	1910	1911	1912	1913	1914	1915	1916	1917	1918	1919	1920	1921	1922	1923
Summer Olympic Games											2nd			
World Championships				3rd									2nd	3rd
Swedish Championships	2nd		3rd	1st		1st		1st		1st				
Finnish Championships (Guest skater)												1st		
