= Britta Lindmark =

Swedish figure skater (1929–2019)

Personal information
- Nationality: Swedish
- Born: 30 March 1929; Stockholm, Sweden
- Died: 10 March 2019 (aged 89); Stockholm, Sweden

Sport
- Sport: Figure skating

Britta Lindmark (30 March 1929 – 10 March 2019) was a Swedish figure skater. She competed in the pairs event at the 1952 Winter Olympics.
