= Åsa Persson =

Swedish figure skater

Personal information
- Born: 17 October 1983 (age 43) Osby, Sweden
- Height: 1.65 m (5 ft 5 in)

Figure skating career
- Country: Sweden
- Skating club: Osby FSC
- Retired: 2003

Åsa Persson (born 17 October 1983 in Osby) is a Swedish former competitive figure skater. She is the 2003 Swedish national champion and 1998 & 1999 junior national champion. She competed in the free skate at four ISU Championships – 2000 Junior Worlds in Oberstdorf, Germany; 2002 Junior Worlds in Hamar, Norway; 2002 Worlds in Nagano, Japan; and 2003 Europeans in Malmö, Sweden. Her highest placement, 14th, came at 2002 Junior Worlds. She was coached by Jan Ullmark.

After retiring from competition, Persson became the Ice Captain on board the Royal Caribbean cruise ship Allure of the Seas.

== Programs ==
Season	Short program	Free skating
2002–2003	Kashmir by John Bonham, Jimmy Page, Robert Plant London Philharmonic Orchestra	Leija's Game; Fuga Y Misterio; Invierno Porteno; Bailongo by Astor Piazzolla
2001–2002	Cinderella Prepares for the Ball	Temptation by Fred Brown; Bésame Mucho by Consuelo Velasques M. Petrucciani with Griffiti String Orchestra; Mambo en Sax by Perez Prado and Orchestra; Mambo Caliente by Arturo Sandoval Orchestra Mambo Kings

== Results ==
International
Event	95–96	96–97	97–98	98–99	99–00	00–01	01–02	02–03
World Champ.							23rd	
European Champ.							26th	25th
Golden Spin							9th	
Nordics							2nd	
Schäfer Memorial							4th	
International: Junior
World Junior Champ.					23rd		14th	
JGP Canada								13th
JGP Czech Republic							7th	
JGP Mexico						11th		
JGP Sweden							5th	
Grand Prize SNP				15th J				
Nordics				2nd J				
Triglav Trophy			9th J					
National
Swedish Champ.	3rd N	1st N	1st J	1st J	3rd			1st
JGP = Junior Grand Prix; Levels: N = Novice; J = Junior
