= Ulf Berendt =

Swedish figure skater (1930–1998)

Personal information
- Nationality: Swedish
- Born: 11 July 1930; Helsingborg, Sweden
- Died: 12 May 1998 (aged 67); Danderyd, Sweden

Sport
- Sport: Figure skating

Ulf Berendt (11 July 1930 – 12 May 1998) was a Swedish figure skater. He competed in the pairs event at the 1952 Winter Olympics.
