= Ragnvi Torslow =

Swedish figure skater, Bilkåren leader

Ragnvi Torslow-Lundgren
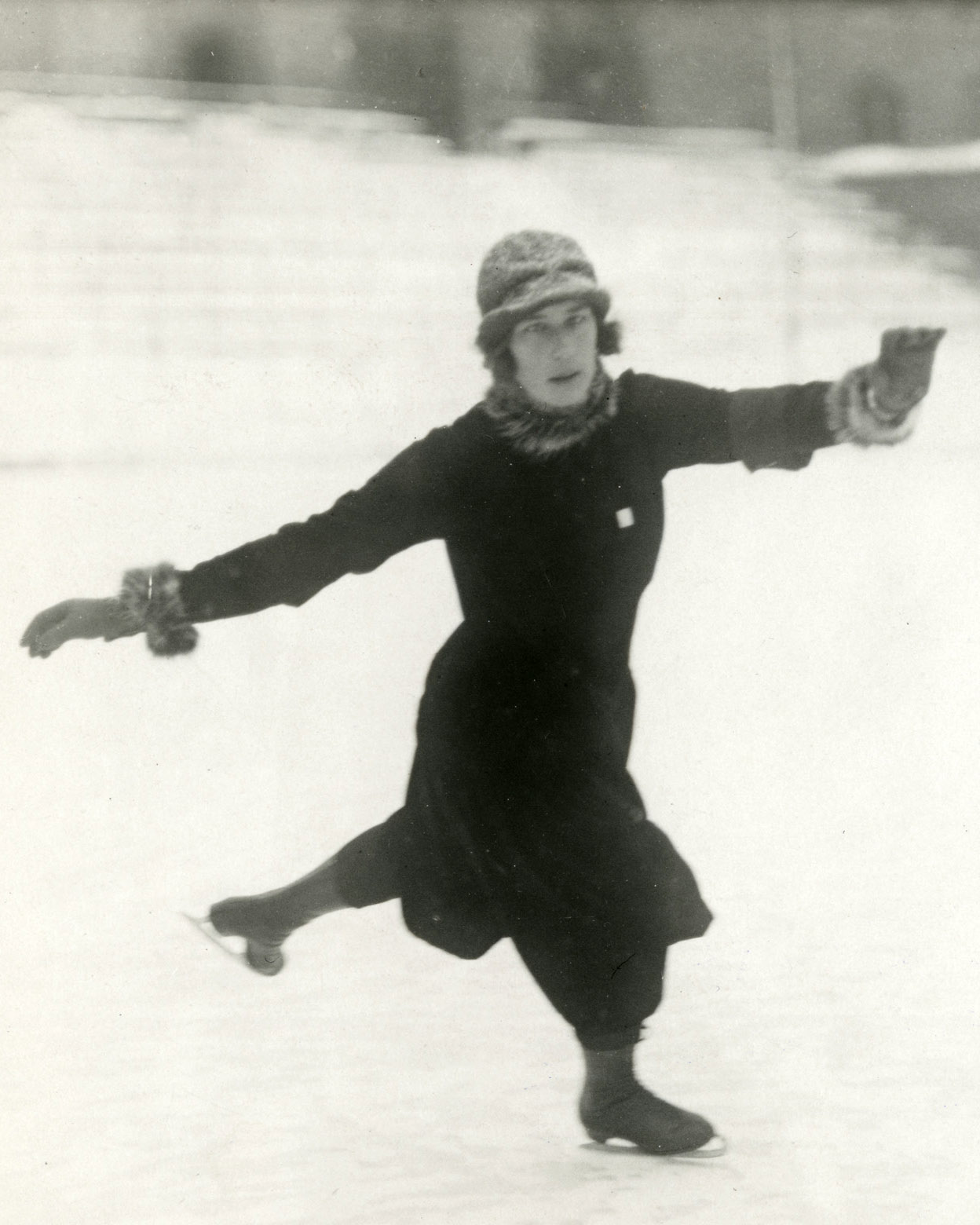
- Torslow at the 1922 Nordic Games
- Born: Ragnvi Gerda Augusta Aurora Torslow; 8 April 1901; Stockholm
- Died: 5 October 1947 (aged 46); Stockholm
- Occupations: figure skater, gymnastics director, bilkårist leader

Ragnvi Torslow-Lundgren (née Torslow; 8 April 1901 – 5 October 1947) was a Swedish figure skater, gymnastics director and bilkårist. She was a five-time Swedish figure skating champion and one of the founder of the Swedish voluntary defence Bilkåren organisation, now known as the Sveriges Bilkårers riksförbund (Swedish Automobile Union).

== Early life ==
Ragnvi Gerda Augusta Aurora Torslow was born on 8 April 1901 in Stockholm. She was known as Toto by friends and family. She grew up in Stockholm with her mother Gerda and a younger sister, Astrid. Her mother was the owner of the well-known Stockholm firm Sucksdorff's Bandhandel. Her father Axel, a sea captain, died when she was four years old. She became known as Ragnvi Torslow-Lundgren following her marriage to Carl Lundgren in 1926.

== Sporting career ==
Both Torslow sisters were active in range of sports from an early age, and were particularly successful at swimming. However, figure skating became the young Ragnvi Torslow's favourite sport. Encouraged by her mother, who had competed in skating in her youth, Torslow trained in figure skating at Stockholms Allmänna Skridskoklubb. By the age of 12, she had won a number of club competitions and went on to win prizes in various school and junior championships. In 1918, having recently moved into adult competitions, she won silver in the Swedish championships. Torslow went on to win two Swedish championship gold medals in figure skating, one in pairs with Kaj af Ekström and one in women's solo skating. She held her Swedish championship title in women's figure skating for five consecutive years, 1920–1924, and won a number of other figure skating medals, including silver in the Nordic Championships in 1922.

== Teaching career and sports organisations ==
While Torslow was at the peak of her sporting career, she trained at the Gymnastiska Centralinstitutet (Gymnastics Central Institute, now the Swedish School of Sport and Physical Education). In 1923, she became a gymnastikdirektör, a Swedish degree title for those who have completed professional training to become a sports teacher or physiotherapist. From 1930 to 1943, she was employed by the Institute as a teacher of games and physical education. She was also a leader of a number of sporting associations, including figure skating, swimming, skiing and the Girl Scouts. In the 1946 Nordisk familjebok sportlexikon, she was described as ‘Sweden's most active and versatile sports leader’.

In addition to her own sporting activities and later teaching, Torslow-Lundgren was active on the boards of several sports clubs. At the age of 14, she had been chairman of the women's section of Idrottsföreningen Kamraterna, and later sat on the boards of the Svenska Simförbundet (Swedish Swimming Association), Sveriges Flickors Scoutförbund (Swedish Girl Scouts Association), Svenska Gymnastiklärarsällskapet (Swedish Gymnastics Teachers' Society, now the Swedish Sports Teachers’ Association), Friluftsdelegationen (the Outdoor Delegation), Cykelfrämjandet, and Skidfrämjandet (now Friluftsfrämjandet). She was one of the founder of Svenska kvinnors centralförbund för fysisk kultur (Swedish Women's Central Association for Physical Culture) (SKCFK) in 1924 during the Kvinnornas idrottsriksdag (Women's Sports Congress) and served on the association's board until 1935.

The SKCFK aimed to become a national unifying women's sports federation, and to promote women's interests in sport. The latter included working to improve access to training facilities for women; ensuring that women sports teachers at the Central Gymnastics Institute received the same pay as their male colleagues; representation on the institute's board of directors, and that what the association called "kvinnlig sakkunskap” (female expertise) was respected and listened to. During the 1920s when women's rights began to increase, sport became the subject of feminist debate and was viewed as a symbolically important arena for women.

The SKCFK was a feminist-orientated association with close links to the contemporary left-liberal women's movement through a number of its members. In addition to gymnastics directors such as Torslow-Lundgren and gymnastics reformer Elin Falk, the organisation's inner circle included women's rights activists such as doctors Karolina Widerström and Ada Nilsson. Nilsson brought a direct personal connection to the feminist magazine Tidevarvet, which also became an important voice for SKCFK. Torslow-Lundgren wrote several articles for the magazine and was interviewed about various sports and women's place in sport. Torslow-Lundgren also led courses in a number of sports on behalf of SKCFK.

== Bilkåren ==
A combination of coincidence and personal friendship led to Torslow-Lundgren's central role in the early development of the Bilkåren, the National Association of Swedish Automobile Corp. Ingrid Holm, was involved in Sweden's Kvinnornas beredskapskommitté (Women's Preparedness Committee), which started voluntary defence training of women as replacement drivers in the Gothenburg area in 1939. Holm had been trying to set up a similar training programme in Stockholm, with little success. Holm and Torslow-Lundgren were old friends and colleagues from the sports movement, and met by accident in Stockholm. Torslow-Lundgren was driving her own car at the time, then an unusual thing for a woman in Sweden to be doing. Holm felt she had found the driving trainer she had been searching for and, after a short period of reflection, Torslow-Lundgren accepted the assignment.

Sweden declared itself neutral in World War II, but suffered from shortages and operated on an emergency footing, making defensive plans against attack, including a Home Guard. This preparation included the Bilkåren, for which Torslow-Lundgren would lead the training of more than 3,000 women drivers ready for volunteer military defence. She also involved her husband, Carl Lundgren, in the work. He was an engineer at the General Motors factory in Stockholm and helped to teach motoring to the members of the Automobile Corps.

Torslow-Lundgren pushed early on for the Automobile Corps members to be organised in their own organisation outside of, but still in close cooperation with, the Women's Emergency Committee. This was confirmed in April 1940 when the Stockholms kvinnliga bilkår bildades (Stockholm Women's Automobile Union) was formed with Torslow-Lundgren at the helm. She travelled around Sweden, encouraging the formation of further local Automobile Corps and worked to merge the regional groups into a national organisation. This was eventually formed in 1942 under the name Sveriges kvinnliga bilkårers riksförbund, with Torslow-Lundgren as its first chairman. Torslow-Lundgren remained chairman of both the Stockholm branch and the national organisation until her death in 1947 aged 46 following a period of ill health.
