= Isabelle Olsson =

Isabelle Olsson may refer to:

- Isabelle Olsson (figure skater) (born 1993), Swedish figure skater
- Isabelle Olsson (designer), industrial designer responsible for the appearance of Google Glass
