= Thomas Öberg =

Thomas Öberg may refer to:

- Thomas Öberg (singer) (born 1967), Swedish singer
- Thomas Öberg (figure skater) (born 1958), Swedish figure skater
