= Ullmark =

Ullmark is a surname. Notable people with the surname include:

- Jan Ullmark, Swedish figure skater
- Linus Ullmark (born 1993), Swedish ice hockey player
