= Tuulos (surname) =

Tuulos is a Finnish surname. Notable people with the surname include:

- Kalle Tuulos (1930–2001), Finnish figure skater
- Vilho Tuulos (1895–1967), Finnish triple jumper, uncle of Kalle
