= Nordic Figure Skating Championships =

Recurring figure skating competition

- Status: Active
- Genre: International competition
- Begins: 1919
- Frequency: Annual
- Countries: Denmark; Finland; Iceland; Norway; Sweden
- Organizer: Danish Skating Union; Finnish Figure Skating Association; Icelandic Skating Association; Norwegian Skating Association; Swedish Figure Skating Federation

The Nordic Figure Skating Championships (Swedish: Nordiska mästerskapen i konståkning; Norwegian: Nordiske mesterskap i kunstløp; Danish: Nordiske mesterskaber i kunstskøjteløb; Finnish: Pohjoismaiset taitoluistelun mestaruuskilpailut; Icelandic: Norðurlandameistaramót í listskautaíþróttum) – also reported in media as the Scandinavian Figure Skating Championships – are an annual figure skating competition jointly organized by the skating federations of Denmark, Finland, Iceland, Norway, and Sweden. The first Nordic Championships were held in 1919 in Oslo, Norway, and consisted of events in speed skating and figure skating. The championships were originally limited to skaters from the Nordic countries (Denmark, Finland, Iceland, Norway, and Sweden); however, representatives of any International Skating Union member nations have been able to compete in senior-level events at the championships since 2011, and in junior-level events since 2020.

Medals may be awarded in men's and women's singles at the senior and junior levels. Pair skating was last contested at the Nordic Championships in 1967. Ice dance was contested very infrequently; the last occurrence was in 2012. Three skaters are currently tied for winning the most Nordic Championship titles in men's singles (with six each): Kristoffer Berntsson of Sweden, Per Kjølberg of Norway, and Alexander Majorov of Sweden. Viktoria Helgesson of Sweden holds the record in women's singles (with five), while Ludowika Jakobsson and Walter Jakobsson of Finland hold the record in pair skating (with three).

== Senior medalists ==
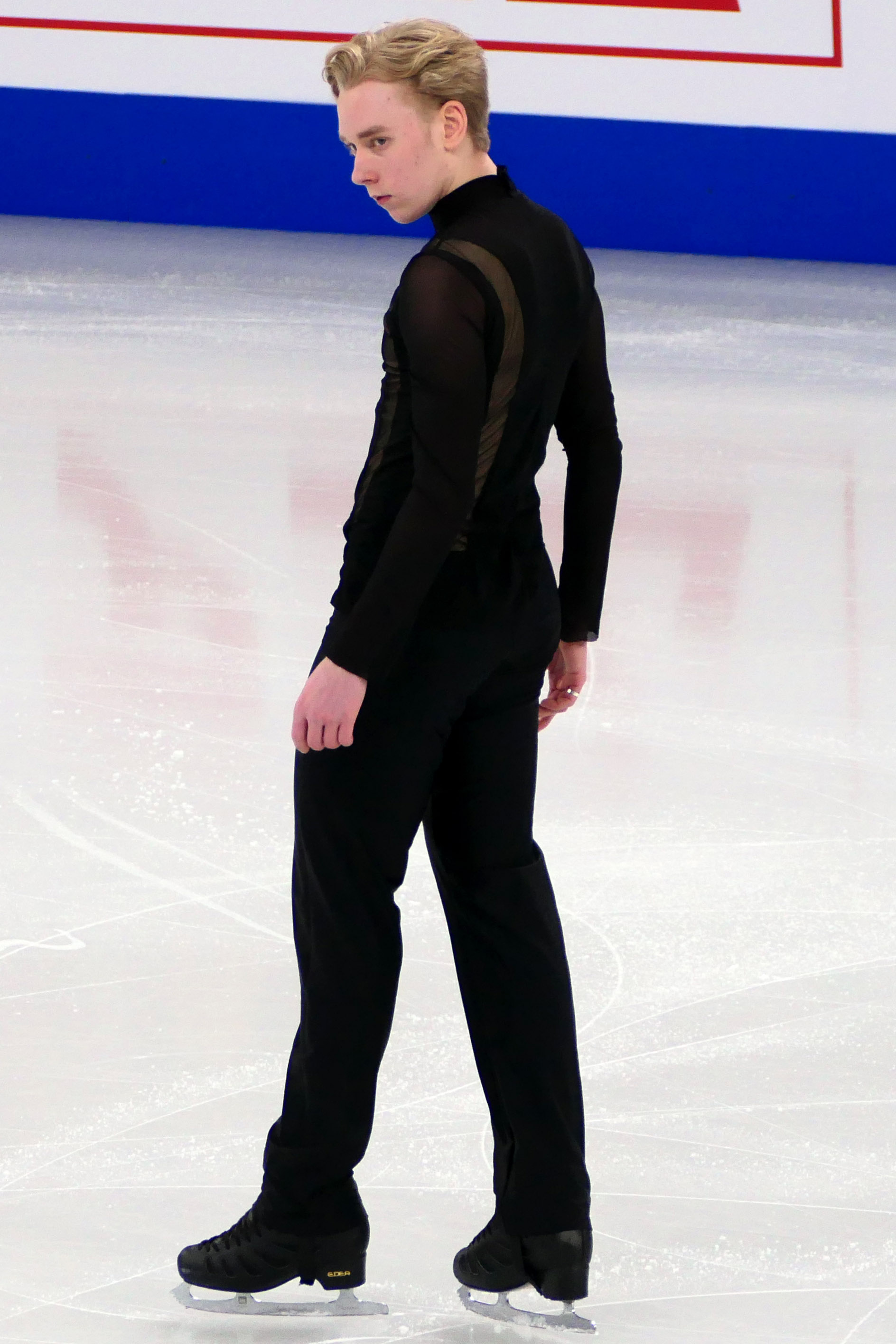
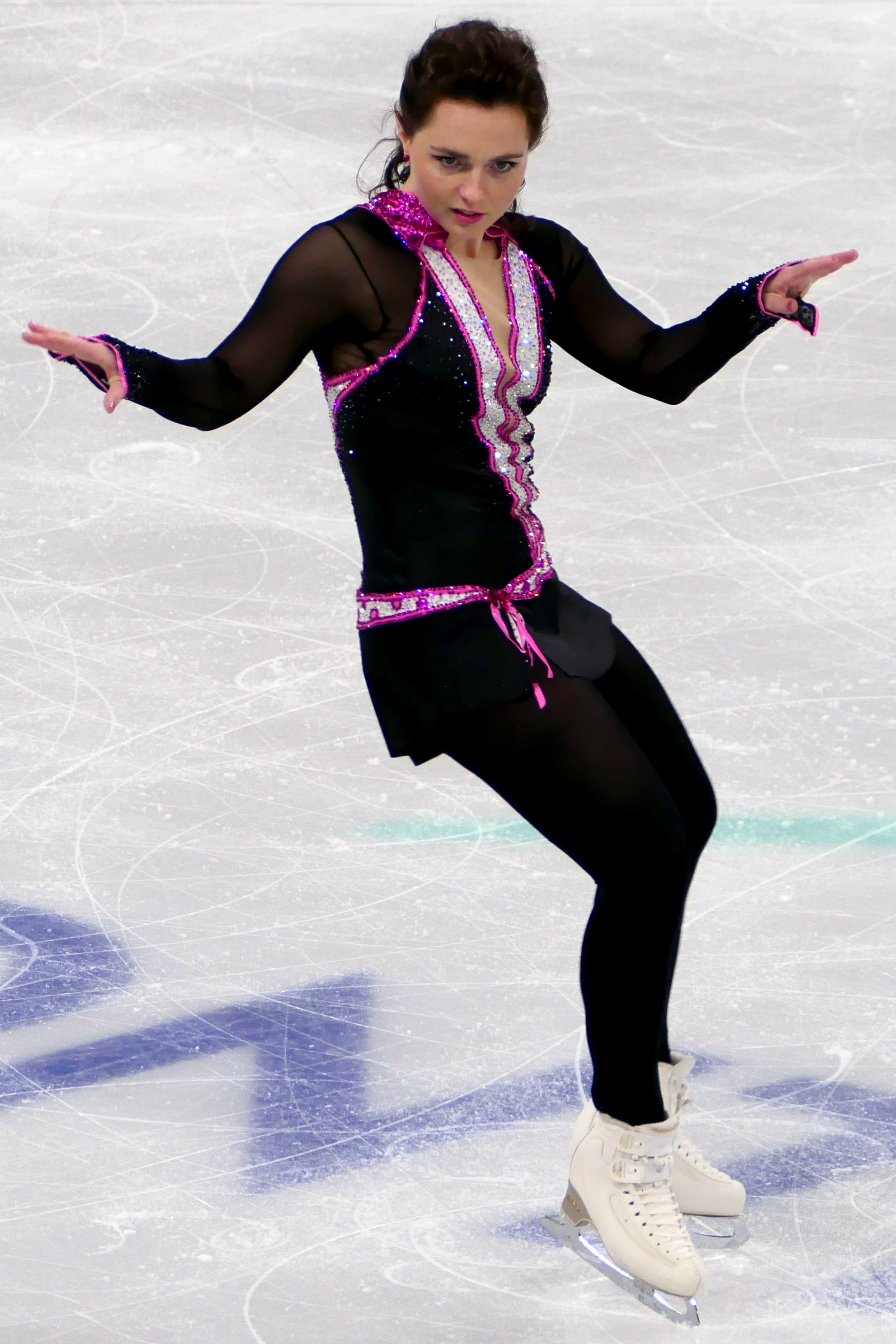
The 2024 Nordic Champions: Andreas Nordebäck of Sweden (men's singles) and Josefin Taljegård of Sweden (women's singles)

=== Men's singles ===
Men's event medalists
Year	Location	Gold	Silver	Bronze	Ref.
1919	(Norway) Kristiania	(Norway) Martin Stixrud	(Norway) Josef Jensen	(Norway) Albert Stixrud	
1920	(Finland) Helsinki	(Sweden) Gillis Grafström	(Norway) Martin Stixrud	(Finland) Sakari Ilmanen	
1921	(Sweden) Stockholm	(Norway) Martin Stixrud	(Finland) Paul Nikkanen	(Finland) Gunnar Jakobsson	
1922	(Norway) Trondheim	(Norway) Martin Stixrud	No other competitors		
1923–45	No competitions held				
1946	(Sweden) Stockholm	(Sweden) Bo Mothander	(Denmark) Per Cock-Clausen	(Finland) Marcus Nikkanen	
1947	(Finland) Turku	(Finland) Lars Björkman	No other competitors		
1948	No competition held				
1949	(Norway) Lillehammer	(Denmark) Per Cock-Clausen	(Finland) Kalle Tuulos	(Sweden) Hans Lindh	
1950	(Sweden) Uppsala	(Denmark) Per Cock-Clausen	(Finland) Kalle Tuulos	No other competitors	
1951	(Finland) Helsinki	(Denmark) Per Cock-Clausen	(Finland) Kalle Tuulos	(Finland) Lars Björkman	
1952	No competition held				
1953	(Sweden) Solna	(Finland) Kalle Tuulos	(Denmark) Per Cock-Clausen	(Sweden) Hans Lindh	
1954	(Norway) Hamar	(Denmark) Per Cock-Clausen	(Finland) Kalle Tuulos	(Sweden) Hans Lindh	
1955	(Sweden) Gothenburg	(Finland) Kalle Tuulos	(Denmark) Per Cock-Clausen	(Sweden) Hans Lindh	
1956	(Finland) Helsinki	(Finland) Kalle Tuulos	(Norway) Per Kjølberg	(Denmark) Per Cock-Clausen	
1957	(Sweden) Stockholm	(Norway) Per Kjølberg	(Sweden) Hans Lindh	(Denmark) Per Cock-Clausen	
1958	(Norway) Gjøvik	(Norway) Per Kjølberg	(Denmark) Per Cock-Clausen	(Finland) Ragnar Wikström	
1959	(Finland) Helsinki	(Norway) Per Kjølberg	(Finland) Jorma Heinonen	(Finland) Ragnar Wikström	
1960	(Sweden) Jönköping	(Norway) Per Kjølberg	(Finland) Ragnar Wikström	(Sweden) Raymond Wiklander	
1961	(Denmark) Copenhagen	(Norway) Per Kjølberg	(Finland) Ragnar Wikström	(Norway) Erik Grünert	
1962	(Norway) Lillehammer	(Norway) Per Kjølberg	(Finland) Ragnar Wikström	(Sweden) Raymond Wiklander	
1963	(Finland) Lahti	(Finland) Ragnar Wikström	(Finland) Ilkka Varhee	(Sweden) Raymond Wiklander	
1964	(Sweden) Malmö	(Finland) Ragnar Wikström	(Sweden) Jan Ullmark	(Sweden) Raymond Wiklander	
1965	(Denmark) Copenhagen	(Sweden) Jan Ullmark	(Sweden) Tony Berntler	(Denmark) Arne Hoffman	
1966	(Norway) Sarpsborg	(Sweden) Tony Berntler	(Sweden) Jan Ullmark	(Sweden) Thomas Callerud	
1967	(Finland) Helsinki	(Sweden) Tony Berntler	(Sweden) Thomas Callerud	(Sweden) Jan Ullmark	
1968	(Sweden) Gävle	(Sweden) Tony Berntler	(Sweden) Thomas Callerud	(Finland) Ragnar Wikström	
1969	(Denmark) Copenhagen	(Sweden) Thomas Callerud	(Sweden) Tony Berntler	(Denmark) Preben Lindenkrone Sørensen	
1970	(Finland) Helsinki	(Sweden) Tony Berntler	(Finland) Pekka Leskinen	(Finland) Ragnar Wikström	
1971	(Sweden) Gothenburg	(Sweden) Thomas Callerud	(Finland) Pekka Leskinen	(Denmark) Arne Hoffman	
1972	(Norway) Oslo	(Denmark) John Ferdinandsen	(Denmark) Arne Hoffman	(Sweden) Thomas Öberg	
1973	(Denmark) Copenhagen	(Sweden) Thomas Öberg	(Denmark) Preben Lindenkrone Sørensen	No other competitors	
1974	(Finland) Helsinki	(Finland) Pekka Leskinen	(Sweden) Thomas Öberg	(Denmark) Preben Lindenkrone Sørensen	
1975	(Sweden) Malmö	(Finland) Pekka Leskinen	(Sweden) Thomas Öberg	(Denmark) Flemming Søderquist	
1976	(Norway) Stavanger	(Sweden) Thomas Öberg	(Sweden) Nils-Åke Nelson	(Denmark) Jan Glerup	
1977	(Denmark) Copenhagen	(Sweden) Nils-Åke Nelson	(Denmark) Flemming Søderquist	(Sweden) Matthias Eidman	
1978	(Finland) Oulu	(Sweden) Thomas Öberg	(Finland) Antti Kontiola	(Sweden) Matthias Eidman	
1979	(Sweden) Gothenburg	(Sweden) Thomas Öberg	(Finland) Antti Kontiola	(Sweden) Matthias Eidman	
1980	(Norway) Trondheim	(Finland) Antti Kontiola	(Sweden) Peter Söderholm	(Sweden) Matthias Eidman	
1981	(Denmark) Aarhus	(Finland) Antti Kontiola	(Denmark) Todd Sand	(Sweden) Peter Söderholm	
1982	(Finland) Helsinki	(Denmark) Todd Sand	(Finland) Antti Kontiola	(Sweden) Peter Söderholm	
1983	(Sweden) Gothenburg	(Denmark) Fini Ravn	(Denmark) Lars Dresler	(Sweden) Peter Söderholm	
1984	(Norway) Oslo	(Denmark) Henrik Walentin	(Finland) Antti Kontiola	(Denmark) Fini Ravn	
1985	(Denmark) Copenhagen	(Sweden) Lars Åkesson	(Denmark) Lars Dresler	(Denmark) Henrik Walentin	
1986	(Finland) Turku	(Sweden) Lars Åkesson	(Sweden) Peter Johansson	(Denmark) Henrik Walentin	
1987	(Sweden) Upplands Väsby	(Denmark) Henrik Walentin	(Finland) Jari Kauppi	(Sweden) Kim Ketelsen	
1988	(Norway) Asker	(Sweden) Peter Johansson	(Denmark) Henrik Walentin	(Finland) Jari Kauppi	
1989	(Denmark) Hvidovre	(Sweden) Peter Johansson	(Denmark) Henrik Walentin	(Denmark) Lars Dresler	
1990	(Finland) Helsinki	(Denmark) Lars Dresler	(Denmark) Henrik Walentin	(Finland) Oula Jääskeläinen	
1991	(Sweden) Malmö	(Denmark) Henrik Walentin	(Denmark) Michael Tyllesen	(Norway) Jan Erik Digernes	
1992	(Norway) Bergen	(Denmark) Henrik Walentin	(Norway) Jan Erik Digernes	(Sweden) Niclas Karlsson	
1993	(Denmark) Aarhus	(Denmark) Henrik Walentin	(Denmark) Michael Tyllesen	(Sweden) Joel Mangs	
1994	(Finland) Helsinki	(Finland) Markus Leminen	(Denmark) Johnny Rønne Jensen	(Finland) Oula Jääskeläinen	
1995	(Sweden) Enköping	(Finland) Markus Leminen	(Denmark) Michael Tyllesen	(Denmark) Johnny Rønne Jensen	
1996	(Norway) Asker	(Denmark) Michael Tyllesen	(Denmark) Johnny Rønne Jensen	(Finland) Jukka Kalliomäki	
1997	(Denmark) Hvidovre	(Denmark) Johnny Rønne Jensen	(Finland) Jukka Kalliomäki	(Sweden) Ludvig Mannbro	
1998	(Finland) Helsinki	(Denmark) Johnny Rønne Jensen	(Finland) Edvard Pyöriäinen	(Denmark) Lasse Bech	
1999	(Sweden) Linköping	(Denmark) Johnny Rønne Jensen	(Finland) Tero Hämäläinen	No other competitors	
2000	(Norway) Stavanger	(Denmark) Michael Tyllesen	(Denmark) Johnny Rønne Jensen	(Sweden) Filip Stiller	
2001	(Denmark) Odense	(Finland) Edvard Pyöriäinen	(Finland) Joni Juvonen	(Sweden) Mikael Olofsson	
2002	(Finland) Vierumäki	(Sweden) Kristoffer Berntsson	(Sweden) Filip Stiller	(Finland) Ari-Pekka Nurmenkari	
2003	(Iceland) Reykjavík	(Sweden) Kristoffer Berntsson	(Sweden) Filip Stiller	(Finland) Ari-Pekka Nurmenkari	
2004	(Sweden) Helsingborg	(Sweden) Kristoffer Berntsson	(Finland) Antti Aalto	(Sweden) Duran O'Hara Lindblom	
2005	(Norway) Asker	(Sweden) Kristoffer Berntsson	(Sweden) Adrian Schultheiss	(Finland) Ari-Pekka Nurmenkari	
2006	(Denmark) Copenhagen	(Sweden) Adrian Schultheiss	(Sweden) Filip Stiller	(Finland) Ari-Pekka Nurmenkari	
2007	(Finland) Helsinki	(Sweden) Kristoffer Berntsson	(Sweden) Adrian Schultheiss	(Finland) Ari-Pekka Nurmenkari	
2008	(Iceland) Reykjavík	(Finland) Ari-Pekka Nurmenkari	(Finland) Mikko Minkkinen	(Norway) Michael Chrolenko	
2009	(Sweden) Malmö	(Finland) Ari-Pekka Nurmenkari	(Sweden) Alexander Majorov	(Denmark) Justus Strid	
2010	(Norway) Asker	(Sweden) Kristoffer Berntsson	(Sweden) Alexander Majorov	(Finland) Mikko Minkkinen	
2011	(Denmark) Rødovre	(Sweden) Alexander Majorov	(Sweden) Adrian Schultheiss	(Sweden) Kristoffer Berntsson	
2012	(Finland) Vantaa	(Sweden) Alexander Majorov	(Denmark) Justus Strid	(Finland) Julian Lagus	
2013	(Iceland) Reykjavík	(Sweden) Alexander Majorov	(Denmark) Justus Strid	(Monaco) Kim Lucine	
2014	(Sweden) Uppsala	(Sweden) Alexander Majorov	(Denmark) Justus Strid	(Finland) Valtter Virtanen	
2015	(Norway) Stavanger	(Spain) Javier Raya	(Norway) Sondre Oddvoll Boe	(Sweden) Ondrej Spiegl	
2016	(Denmark) Aalborg	(Sweden) Alexander Majorov	(Finland) Valtter Virtanen	(Australia) Brendan Kerry	
2017	(Iceland) Reykjavík	(France) Chafik Besseghier	(Sweden) Ondrej Spiegl	(Estonia) Daniel Albert Naurits	
2018	(Finland) Rovaniemi	(Sweden) Alexander Majorov	(Finland) Valtter Virtanen	(Norway) Sondre Oddvoll Boe	
2019	(Sweden) Linköping	(Norway) Sondre Oddvoll Bøe	(Sweden) Alexander Majorov	(Estonia) Aleksandr Selevko	
2020	(Norway) Stavanger	(Latvia) Deniss Vasiļjevs	(Norway) Sondre Oddvoll Bøe	(Sweden) Illya Solomin	
2021	(Denmark) Copenhagen	Competition cancelled due to the COVID-19 pandemic			
2022	(Denmark) Hørsholm	(Finland) Valtter Virtanen	(Poland) Kornel Witkowski	(Sweden) Oliver Praetorius	
2023	(Iceland) Reykjavík	(Sweden) Andreas Nordebäck	(Sweden) Gabriel Folkesson	(Finland) Makar Suntsev	
2024	(Sweden) Borås	(Sweden) Andreas Nordebäck	(Sweden) Gabriel Folkesson	(Finland) Makar Suntsev	
2025	(Norway) Asker	(Sweden) Casper Johansson	(Finland) Arttu Juusola	(Finland) Jan Ollikainen	
2026	(Denmark) Copenhagen	(Sweden) Hugo Bostedt	(Finland) Arttu Juusola	No other competitors	

=== Women's singles ===
Women's event medalists
Year	Location	Gold	Silver	Bronze	Ref.
1919	(Norway) Kristiania	(Sweden) Magda Mauroy	(Norway) Ingrid Gulbrandsen	(Norway) Margot Moe	
1920	(Finland) Helsinki	(Finland) Anna-Lisa Allart	(Norway) Ingrid Gulbrandsen	No other competitors	
1921	(Sweden) Stockholm	(Sweden) Magda Julin	(Norway) Ingrid Gulbrandsen	(Norway) Margot Moe	
1922	(Norway) Trondheim	(Norway) Margot Moe	(Norway) Ingrid Gulbrandsen	No other competitors	
1923–45	No competitions held				
1946	(Sweden) Stockholm	(Sweden) Britta Råhlén	(Sweden) Gun Ericson	(Finland) Leena Pietilä	
1947	(Finland) Turku	(Finland) Leena Pietilä	(Finland) Kirsti Linna	No other competitors	
1948	No competition held				
1949	(Norway) Lillehammer	(Norway) Marit Henie	(Norway) Bjørg Løhnner	(Finland) Leena Pietilä	
1950	(Sweden) Uppsala	(Sweden) Gun Ericson	(Finland) Leena Pietilä	(Norway) Marit Henie	
1951	(Finland) Helsinki	(Finland) Leena Pietilä	(Sweden) Margaretha Brungårdh	(Finland) Kirsti Linna	
1952	No competition held				
1953	(Sweden) Solna	(Sweden) Gun Mothander	(Finland) Leena Pietilä	(Sweden) Margaretha Brunsgårdh	
1954	(Norway) Hamar	(Norway) Ingeborg Nilsson	(Sweden) Gun Mothander	(Sweden) Ally Lundström	
1955	(Sweden) Gothenburg	(Norway) Ingeborg Nilsson	(Norway) Britt Turid Aronsen	(Sweden) Ally Lundström	
1956	(Finland) Helsinki	(Norway) Britt Turid Aronsen	(Norway) Ingeborg Nilsson	(Finland) Kiirsti Linna	
1957	(Sweden) Stockholm	(Sweden) Ally Lundström	(Norway) Grete Borgen	(Norway) Anne Karin Dehle	
1958	(Norway) Gjøvik	(Norway) Grete Borgen	(Norway) Anne Karin Dehle	(Norway) Astrid Ekeberg	
1959	(Finland) Helsinki	(Norway) Anne Karin Dehle	(Norway) Grete Borgen	(Norway) Astrid Ekeberg	
1960	(Sweden) Jönköping	(Norway) Anne Karin Dehle	(Norway) Siri Kamfjord	(Norway) Astrid Ekeberg	
1961	(Denmark) Copenhagen	(Norway) Anne Karin Dehle	(Norway) Berit Unn Johansen	(Norway) Astrid Ekeberg	
1962	(Norway) Lillehammer	(Norway) Anne Karin Dehle	(Sweden) Ann-Margreth Frei	(Norway) Berit Unn Johansen	
1963	(Finland) Lahti	(Sweden) Ann-Margreth Frei-Käck	(Norway) Viviann Østby	(Finland) Pia Wingisaar	
1964	(Sweden) Malmö	(Sweden) Ann-Margreth Frei-Käck	(Norway) Berit Unn Johansen	(Norway) Anne Karin Dehle	
1965	(Denmark) Copenhagen	(Denmark) Marianne Bæk	(Norway) Anne Karin Dehle	(Sweden) Britt Elfving	
1966	(Norway) Sarpsborg	(Sweden) Britt Elfving	(Norway) Anne Karin Dehle	(Finland) Anna-Maija Rissanen	
1967	(Finland) Helsinki	(Sweden) Britt Elfving	(Denmark) Jette Vad	(Finland) Pia Vingisaar	
1968	(Sweden) Gävle	(Norway) Anne Karin Dehle	(Denmark) Jette Vad	(Sweden) Louise Lettström	
1969	(Denmark) Copenhagen	(Sweden) Britt Elfving	(Sweden) Eva Hermansson	(Sweden) Louise Lettström	
1970	(Finland) Helsinki	(Sweden) Anita Johansson	(Sweden) Eva Hermansson	(Norway) Anne Karin Dehle	
1971	(Sweden) Gothenburg	(Sweden) Lise-Lotte Öberg	(Sweden) Anita Johansson	(Sweden) Louise Lettström	
1972	(Norway) Oslo	(Sweden) Lise-Lotte Öberg	(Norway) Bjørg Ellen Ringdal	(Norway) Liv Egelund	
1973	(Denmark) Copenhagen	(Sweden) Lise-Lotte Öberg	(Finland) Tarja Näsi	(Norway) Liv Egelund	
1974	(Finland) Helsinki	(Finland) Tarja Näsi	(Finland) Hannele Koskinen	(Finland) Susan Broman	
1975	(Sweden) Malmö	(Finland) Susan Broman	(Sweden) Lise-Lotte Öberg	(Finland) Kristiina Wegelius	
1976	(Norway) Stavanger	(Finland) Kristiina Wegelius	(Finland) Hannele Koskinen	(Finland) Susan Broman	
1977	(Denmark) Copenhagen	(Finland) Kristiina Wegelius	(Finland) Niina Kyöttinen	(Sweden) Bodil Olsson	
1978	(Finland) Oulu	(Finland) Hannele Koskinen	(Finland) Susan Broman	(Sweden) Christina Svensson	
1979	(Sweden) Gothenburg	(Finland) Susan Broman	(Norway) Jeanne Chapman	(Sweden) Bodil Olsson	
1980	(Norway) Trondheim	(Finland) Pia Snellman	(Sweden) Catarina Lindgren	(Finland) Paivi Nieminen	
1981	(Denmark) Aarhus	(Sweden) Christina Svensson	(Denmark) Hanne Gamborg	(Finland) Lotta Isaksson	
1982	(Finland) Helsinki	(Finland) Susanna Peltola	(Sweden) Anette Olsson	(Finland) Elise Ahonen	
1983	(Sweden) Gothenburg	(Denmark) Hanne Gamborg	(Sweden) Anette Olsson	(Finland) Nina Östman	
1984	(Norway) Oslo	(Finland) Elina Hänninen	(Finland) Nina Östman	(Sweden) Lotta Falkenbäck	
1985	(Denmark) Copenhagen	(Sweden) Lotta Falkenbäck	(Sweden) Maria Bergqvist	(Sweden) Karin Starzmann	
1986	(Finland) Turku	(Sweden) Lotta Falkenbäck	(Finland) Elise Ahonen	(Finland) Elina Hänninen	
1987	(Sweden) Upplands Väsby	(Sweden) Lotta Falkenbäck	(Finland) Elina Hänninen	(Sweden) Birgitta Andersson	
1988	(Norway) Asker	(Sweden) Hélène Persson	(Sweden) Susanne Seger	(Denmark) Anisette Torp-Lind	
1989	(Denmark) Hvidovre	(Sweden) Hélène Persson	(Denmark) Anisette Torp-Lind	(Sweden) Ann-Marie Söderholm	
1990	(Finland) Helsinki	(Finland) Mari Niskanen	(Sweden) Ines Klubal	(Finland) Mila Kajas	
1991	(Sweden) Malmö	(Sweden) Hélène Persson	(Finland) Mila Kajas	(Sweden) Ines Klubal	
1992	(Norway) Bergen	(Finland) Kaisa Kella	(Finland) Mila Kajas	(Sweden) Ann-Marie Söderholm	
1993	(Denmark) Aarhus	(Finland) Kaisa Kella	(Denmark) Anisette Torp-Lind	(Sweden) Ann-Marie Söderholm	
1994	(Finland) Helsinki	(Finland) Tuire Kuronen	(Finland) Kaisa Kella	(Sweden) Helena Grundberg	
1995	(Sweden) Enköping	(Finland) Hannele Lundström	(Finland) Mila Kajas	(Sweden) Helena Grundberg	
1996	(Norway) Asker	(Finland) Kaisa Kella	(Finland) Alisa Drei	(Finland) Jessica Grahn	
1997	(Denmark) Hvidovre	(Finland) Elina Kettunen	(Finland) Annukka Laukkanen	(Finland) Sanna-Maija Wiksten	
1998	(Finland) Helsinki	(Finland) Sanna-Maija Wiksten	(Finland) Annukka Laukkanen	(Sweden) Klara Bramfeldt	
1999	(Sweden) Linköping	(Finland) Elina Kettunen	(Finland) Sanna-Maija Wiksten	(Sweden) Anna Lundström	
2000	(Norway) Stavanger	(Finland) Susanna Pöykiö	(Sweden) Anna Lundström	(Sweden) Klara Bramfeldt	
2001	(Denmark) Odense	(Denmark) Mikkeline Kierkgaard	(Finland) Taru Karvosenoja	(Sweden) Klara Bramfeldt	
2002	(Finland) Vierumäki	(Finland) Alisa Drei	(Sweden) Åsa Persson	(Sweden) Anna Lundström	
2003	(Iceland) Reykjavík	(Finland) Elina Kettunen	(Finland) Susanna Pöykiö	(Sweden) Johanna Götesson	
2004	(Sweden) Helsingborg	(Finland) Elina Kettunen	(Sweden) Lina Johansson	(Finland) Sari Hakola	
2005	(Norway) Asker	(Finland) Alisa Drei	(Finland) Elina Kettunen	(Finland) Tytti Tervonen	
2006	(Denmark) Copenhagen	(Finland) Niina Laksola	(Sweden) Malin Hållberg-Leuf	(Finland) Elina Vesamäki	
2007	(Finland) Helsinki	(Finland) Susanna Pöykiö	(Finland) Laura Lepistö	(Sweden) Lina Johansson	
2008	(Iceland) Reykjavík	(Sweden) Viktoria Helgesson	(Sweden) Maria Taljegård	(Sweden) Malin Hållberg-Leuf	
2009	(Sweden) Malmö	(Sweden) Viktoria Helgesson	(Sweden) Linnea Mellgren	(Finland) Henriikka Hietaniemi	
2010	(Norway) Asker	(Sweden) Viktoria Helgesson	(Sweden) Angelica Olsson	(Sweden) Joshi Helgesson	
2011	(Denmark) Rødovre	(Sweden) Viktoria Helgesson	(Sweden) Linnea Mellgren	(Finland) Juulia Turkkila	
2012	(Finland) Vantaa	(Finland) Juulia Turkkila	(Sweden) Joshi Helgesson	(Sweden) Isabelle Olsson	
2013	(Iceland) Reykjavík	(Sweden) Viktoria Helgesson	(Sweden) Joshi Helgesson	(Denmark) Anita Madsen	
2014	(Sweden) Uppsala	(Sweden) Joshi Helgesson	(Sweden) Viktoria Helgesson	(Finland) Liubov Efimenko	
2015	(Norway) Stavanger	(Finland) Jenni Saarinen	(Norway) Anne Line Gjersem	(Finland) Viveca Lindfors	
2016	(Denmark) Aalborg	(Sweden) Joshi Helgesson	(Finland) Viveca Lindfors	(Sweden) Isabelle Olsson	
2017	(Iceland) Reykjavík	(Italy) Carolina Kostner	(Russia) Elizaveta Tuktamysheva	(Sweden) Anita Östlund	
2018	(Finland) Rovaniemi	(Finland) Viveca Lindfors	(Sweden) Anita Östlund	(Sweden) Josefin Taljegard	
2019	(Sweden) Linköping	(Finland) Jenni Saarinen	(Estonia) Gerli Liinamäe	(Finland) Vera Stolt	
2020	(Norway) Stavanger	(Italy) Lara Naki Gutmann	(Finland) Emmi Peltonen	(Finland) Jenni Saarinen	
2021	(Denmark) Copenhagen	Competition cancelled due to the COVID-19 pandemic			
2022	(Denmark) Hørsholm	(Finland) Oona Ounasvuori	(Chinese Taipei) Ting Tzu-Han	(Finland) Olivia Lisko	
2023	(Iceland) Reykjavík	(Finland) Nella Pelkonen	(Finland) Janna Jyrkinen	(Finland) Olivia Lisko	
2024	(Sweden) Borås	(Sweden) Josefin Taljegård	(Norway) Mia Risa Gomez	(Finland) Olivia Lisko	
2025	(Norway) Asker	(Finland) Olivia Lisko	(Finland) Linnea Ceder	(Sweden) Josefin Taljegård	
2026	(Denmark) Copenhagen	(Finland) Iida Karhunen	(Norway) Mia Risa Gomez	(Finland) Olivia Lisko	

=== Pairs ===
Pairs event medalists
Year	Location	Gold	Silver	Bronze	Ref.
1919	(Norway) Kristiania	(Finland); Ludowika Jakobsson; Walter Jakobsson	(Norway); Alexia Bryn; Yngvar Bryn	(Norway); Margit Jacobsen; M. Engebretsen	
1920	(Finland) Helsinki	(Finland); Ludowika Jakobsson; Walter Jakobsson	(Norway); Margit Jacobsen; M. Engebretsen	No other competitors	
1921	(Sweden) Stockholm	(Finland); Ludowika Jakobsson; Walter Jakobsson	(Norway); Alexia Bryn; Yngvar Bryn	(Sweden); Helfrid Palm; Agard Berghagen	
1922	(Norway) Trondheim	(Norway); Alexia Bryn; Yngvar Bryn	(Norway); Mr. Ingebrotsen; Mrs. Ingebrotsen	No other competitors	
1923–45	No competitions held				
1946	(Sweden) Stockholm	(Sweden); Brita Råhlsen; Bo Mothander	(Sweden); Gun Hammarin; Sven Brandelius	(Denmark); Inger Weitzmann; Harry Meistrup	
1947	(Finland) Turku	(Finland); Harriet Pantaenius; Lars Björkmann	No other competitors		
1948	No competition held				
1949	(Norway) Lillehammer	(Norway); Margot Walle; Allan Fjeldheim	(Sweden); Britta Lindmark; Ulf Berendt	(Finland); Harriet Pantaenius; Lars Björkmann	
1950	(Sweden) Uppsala	(Sweden); Gertrud Mikhejew; Sture Höidén	(Finland); Harriet Pantaenius; Lars Björkmann	(Finland); Inkeri Soininen; Paavo Mäkelä	
1951	(Finland) Helsinki	(Sweden); Britta Lindmark; Ulf Berendt	(Finland); Leena Pietilä; Lars Björkman	No other competitors	
1952	No competition held				
1953	(Sweden) Solna	(Finland); Leena Pietilä; Lars Björkman	(Norway); Bjørg Skjælaaen; Johannes Thorsen	No other competitors	
1954	(Norway) Hamar	(Sweden); Britta Lindmark; Ulf Berendt	(Norway); Bjørg Skjælaaen; Johannes Thorsen	No other competitors	
1955	(Sweden) Gothenburg	(Norway); Bjørg Skjælaaen; Johannes Thorsen	(Norway); Ingeborg Nilsson; Reidar Börjeson	(Sweden); Gun Mothander; Hans Lindh	
1956	(Finland) Helsinki	(Norway); Ingeborg Nilsson; Reidar Börjeson	(Sweden); Mona-Lisa Englund; Ronny Hall	No other competitors	
1957	(Sweden) Stockholm	(Sweden); Agneta Wale; Kristian Wale	(Norway); Ingeborg Nilsson; Reidar Börjeson	(Sweden); Maud Levin; Inge Sterner	
1958	(Norway) Gjøvik	(Sweden); Agneta Wale; Kristian Wale	(Norway); Ingeborg Nilsson; Reidar Börjeson	(Finland); Soile Drufva; Nils Kankkonen	
1959	(Finland) Helsinki	(Norway); Grete Borgen; Per Kjølberg	(Finland); Soile Drufva; Nils Kankkonen	(Sweden); Margareta Ericson; Staffan Thorson	
1960	(Sweden) Jönköping	(Norway); Grete Borgen; Per Kjølberg	(Norway); Liv Lunde; Erik Grünert	(Sweden); Britta Eriksson; Ronny Hall	
1961	(Denmark) Copenhagen	(Norway); Liv Lunde; Erik Grünert	(Sweden); Margareta Ericson; Staffan Thorson	(Denmark); Ayoe Bardram; Alf Refer	
1962	(Norway) Lillehammer	(Norway); Liv Lunde; Erik Grünert	(Sweden); Gunilla Lindberg; Gunnar de Shàrengrad	(Sweden); Boel Lögdberg; Christer Eriksson	
1963	(Finland) Lahti	(Norway); Karin Bjerke Magnussen; Erik Grünert	(Sweden); Gunilla Lindberg; Gunnar de Shàrengrad	(Finland); Anna-Maja Rissanen; Ilkka Varhee	
1964	(Sweden) Malmö	(Finland); Anna-Maija Rissanen; Ilkka Varhee	(Sweden); Marie Gellermark; Conny Wilbe	(Sweden); Boel Lögdberg; Christer Eriksson	
1965	(Denmark) Copenhagen	(Norway); Karin Bjerke Magnussen; Erik Grünert	(Sweden); Marie Gellermark; Conny Wilbe	No other competitors	
1966	(Norway) Sarpsborg	No pairs competitors			
1967	(Finland) Helsinki	(Norway); Anikken Støa; Erik Grünert	No other competitors		
No pairs competitions since 1967

=== Ice dance ===
Ice dance event medalists
Year	Location	Gold	Silver	Bronze	Ref.
1972	(Norway) Oslo	(Denmark); Vivi Poulsen; Kurt Poulsen	No other competitors		
1973	(Denmark) Copenhagen	(Denmark); Vivi Poulsen; Kurt Poulsen	No other competitors		
1974–81	No ice dance competitions				
1982	(Finland) Helsinki	(Finland); Saila Saarinen; Kim Jacobson	(Sweden); Ulla Örnmarker; Thomas Svedberg	(Sweden); Karin Eliasson; Sten-Olof Eliasson	
1983	(Sweden) Gothenburg	(Sweden); Annika Persson; Johan Formgren	(Sweden); Maria Ström; Owe Ridderstråle	No other competitors	
1984–86	No ice dance competitions				
1987	(Sweden) Upplands Väsby	(Sweden); Åsa Agblad; Ove Ridderstråle	(Finland); Susanna Peltola; Kim Jacobson	(Sweden); Johanna Elfving; Pontus Krantz	
1988–2011	No ice dance competitions				
2012	(Finland) Vantaa	(Finland); Henna Lindholm; Ossi Kanervo	(Sweden); Malin Malmberg; Thomas Nordahl	No other competitors	
No ice dance competitions since 2012

== Junior medalists ==
While junior-level competitions were held at the Nordic Championships prior to 1995, this is earliest for which full results have been documented.

=== Men's singles ===
Junior men's event medalists
Year	Location	Gold	Silver	Bronze	Ref.
1995	(Sweden) Enköping	(Sweden) Kristoffer Berntsson	(Sweden) Mikael Olofsson	(Sweden) Pasi Honkanen	
1996	(Norway) Asker	(Sweden) Kristoffer Berntsson	(Denmark) Lasse Bech	(Finland) Edvard Pyöriäinen	
1997	(Denmark) Hvidovre	(Sweden) Filip Stiller	(Finland) Edvard Pyöriäinen	(Sweden) Mikael Olofsson	
1998	(Finland) Helsinki	(Sweden) Kristoffer Berntsson	(Sweden) Henrik Forsgren	(Denmark) Tem Lylloff	
1999	(Sweden) Linköping	(Sweden) Filip Stiller	(Sweden) Kristoffer Berntsson	(Sweden) Hunor Thurman	
2000	(Norway) Stavanger	(Finland) Ari-Pekka Nurmenkari	(Finland) Mikko Minkkinen	(Sweden) Mikael Olofsson	
2001	(Denmark) Odense	(Sweden) Filip Stiller	(Finland) Mikko Minkkinen	(Finland) Ari-Pekka Nurmenkari	
2002	(Finland) Vierumäki	(Sweden) Niklas Hogner	(Finland) Mikko Minkkinen	(Finland) Antti Aalto	
2003	(Iceland) Reykjavík	(Sweden) Adrian Schultheiss	(Sweden) Niklas Hogner	(Finland) Tommi Piiroinen	
2004	(Sweden) Helsingborg	(Sweden) Adrian Schultheiss	(Norway) Michael Chrolenko	(Finland) Valtter Virtanen	
2005	(Norway) Asker	(Norway) Michael Chrolenko	(Sweden) Justus Strid	(Finland) Tommi Piiroinen	
2006	(Denmark) Copenhagen	(Sweden) Alexander Majorov	(Finland) Valtter Virtanen	(Sweden) Justus Strid	
2007	(Finland) Helsinki	(Sweden) Alexander Majorov	(Finland) Samuli Tyyskä	(Sweden) Anton Truvé	
2008	(Iceland) Reykjavík	(Sweden) Anton Truvé	(Finland) Filip Nordman	(Finland) Otto-Eemeli Laamanen	
2009	(Sweden) Malmö	(Finland) Otto-Eemeli Laamanen	(Sweden) Michael Neumann	(Finland) Matthias Versluis	
2010	(Norway) Asker	(Finland) Viktor Zubik	(Sweden) Ondrej Spiegl	(Finland) Julian Lagus	
2011	(Denmark) Rødovre	(Finland) Julian Lagus	(Sweden) Ondrej Spiegl	(Sweden) Mathias Andersson	
2012	(Finland) Vantaa	(Finland) Tino Olenius	(Sweden) Josef Oscarsson-Ericsson	(Sweden) Marcus Björk	
2013	(Iceland) Reykjavík	(Norway) Sondre Oddvoll Bøe	(Sweden) Nicky-Leo Obreykov	(Finland) Tino Olenius	
2014	(Sweden) Uppsala	(Sweden) Illya Solomin	(Sweden) Nicky-Leo Obreykov	(Finland) Tino Olenius	
2015	(Norway) Stavanger	(Finland) Roman Galay	(Finland) Tino Olenius	(Sweden) Mandus Thorman	
2016	(Denmark) Aalborg	(Sweden) Nikolaj Majorov	(Sweden) John-Olof Hallman	(Denmark) Daniel Tsion	
2017	(Iceland) Reykjavík	(Sweden) Nikolaj Majorov	(Sweden) Natran Tzagai	(Sweden) Mikael Nordebäck	
2018	(Finland) Rovaniemi	(Sweden) Andreas Nordebäck	(Sweden) Mikael Nordebäck	(Denmark) Nikolaj Pedersen	
2019	(Sweden) Linköping	(Sweden) Oliver Praetorius	(Sweden) Daniel Seidel	(Finland) Lucas Tiilikainen	
2020	(Norway) Stavanger	(Sweden) Casper Johansson	(Sweden) Jonathan Egyptson	(Finland) Lauri Lankila	
2021	(Denmark) Copenhagen	Competition cancelled due to the COVID-19 pandemic			
2022	(Denmark) Hørsholm	(Sweden) Andreas Nordebäck	(Sweden) Casper Johansson	(Finland) Matias Lindfors	
2023	(Iceland) Reykjavík	(Sweden) Casper Johansson	(Finland) Matias Lindfors	(Sweden) Jonathan Egyptson	
2024	(Sweden) Borås	(Sweden) Casper Johansson	(Finland) Matias Lindfors	(Sweden) Hugo Bostedt	
2025	(Norway) Asker	(Sweden) Elias Sayed	(Sweden) Albin Samuelsson	(Sweden) Hugo Bostedt	
2026	(Denmark) Copenhagen	(Finland) Matias Lindfors	(Sweden) Albin Samuelsson	(Norway) Daniil Valanov	

=== Women's singles ===
Junior women's event medalists
Year	Location	Gold	Silver	Bronze	Ref.
1995	(Sweden) Enköping	(Sweden) Ann-Sofi Kähr	(Norway) Kaja Hanevold	(Finland) Selja Teitti	
1996	(Norway) Asker	(Finland) Sanna-Maija Wiksten	(Finland) Elina Kettunen	(Finland) Miia Marttinen	
1997	(Denmark) Hvidovre	(Finland) Sara Lindroos	(Finland) Pia Airaksinen	(Finland) Kati Simola	
1998	(Finland) Helsinki	(Denmark) Mikkeline Kierkgaard	(Finland) Kati Simola	(Finland) Tiina Weckman	
1999	(Sweden) Linköping	(Denmark) Mikkeline Kierkgaard	(Sweden) Åsa Persson	(Finland) Marjut Turunen	
2000	(Norway) Stavanger	(Finland) Taru Karvosenoja	(Sweden) Johanna Götesson	(Sweden) Jessica Söderlind	
2001	(Denmark) Odense	(Finland) Sari Hakola	(Finland) Mari Hirvonen	(Sweden) Johanna Götesson	
2002	(Finland) Vierumäki	(Sweden) Johanna Götesson	(Sweden) Erika Salo	(Finland) Sari Hakola	
2003	(Iceland) Reykjavík	(Finland) Kiira Korpi	(Sweden) Marie Skärgård	(Finland) Laura Lepistö	
2004	(Sweden) Helsingborg	(Finland) Kiira Korpi	(Sweden) Viktoria Helgesson	(Finland) Laura Lepistö	
2005	(Norway) Asker	(Sweden) Isabelle Nylander	(Finland) Laura Lepistö	(Sweden) Amanda Nylander	
2006	(Denmark) Copenhagen	(Finland) Jenni Vähämaa	(Finland) Laura Lepistö	(Sweden) Amanda Nylander	
2007	(Finland) Helsinki	(Finland) Jenni Vähämaa	(Sweden) Maria Taljegård	(Finland) Sofia Otala	
2008	(Iceland) Reykjavík	(Sweden) Joshi Helgesson	(Finland) Alisa Mikonsaari	(Sweden) Angelica Olsson	
2009	(Sweden) Malmö	(Sweden) Joshi Helgesson	(Sweden) Isabelle Olsson	(Norway) Anne Line Gjersem	
2010	(Norway) Asker	(Finland) Beata Papp	(Sweden) Rebecka Emanuelsson	(Finland) Cecilia Törn	
2011	(Denmark) Rødovre	(Sweden) Isabelle Olsson	(Finland) Nea Viiri	(Norway) Anine Rabe	
2012	(Finland) Vantaa	(Finland) Seidi Rantanen	(Finland) Eveliina Viljanen	(Sweden) Rebecka Emanuelsson	
2013	(Iceland) Reykjavík	(Finland) Jenni Saarinen	(Sweden) Josefin Taljegård	(Sweden) Rebecka Emanuelsson	
2014	(Sweden) Uppsala	(Finland) Jenni Saarinen	(Finland) Emmi Peltonen	(Sweden) Matilda Algotsson	
2015	(Norway) Stavanger	(Sweden) Matilda Algotsson	(Finland) Anni Järvenpää	(Norway) Juni Marie Benjaminsen	
2016	(Denmark) Aalborg	(Finland) Joanna Kallela	(Sweden) Anastasia Schneider	(Finland) Emmi Peltonen	
2017	(Iceland) Reykjavík	(Finland) Linnea Ceder	(Finland) Sofia Sula	(Sweden) Cassandra Johansson	
2018	(Finland) Rovaniemi	(Sweden) Smilla Szalkai	(Finland) Sofia Sula	(Finland) Laura Karhunen	
2019	(Sweden) Linköping	(Finland) Selma Välitalo	(Sweden) Emelie Nordqvist	(Finland) Laura Karhunen	
2020	(Norway) Stavanger	(Finland) Laura Karhunen	(Italy) Ester Schwarz	(Finland) Olivia Lisko	
2021	(Denmark) Copenhagen	Competition cancelled due to the COVID-19 pandemic			
2022	(Denmark) Hørsholm	(Finland) Janna Jyrkinen	(Finland) Iida Karhunen	(Finland) Petra Lahti	
2023	(Iceland) Reykjavík	(Finland) Iida Karhunen	(Finland) Lotta Artimo	(Finland) Petra Lahti	
2024	(Sweden) Borås	(Finland) Lotta Artimo	(Finland) Darja Trubitson	(Finland) Petra Lahti	
2025	(Norway) Asker	(Finland) Iida Karhunen	(Finland) Venla Sinisalo	(Finland) Annika Pellonmaa	
2026	(Denmark) Copenhagen	(Finland) Venla Sinisalo	(Finland) Lotta Artimo	(Finland) Annika Pellonmaa	

== Records ==
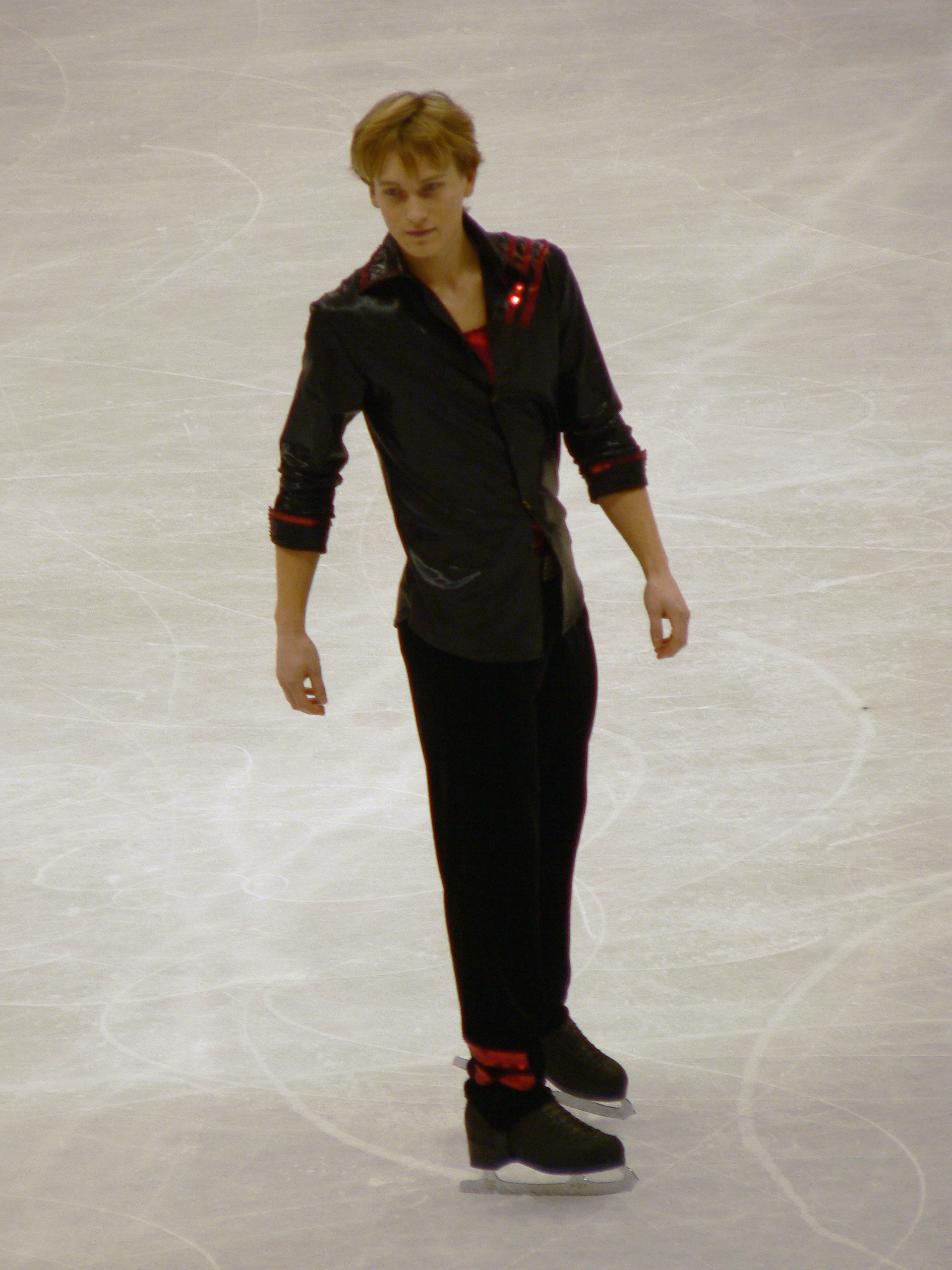
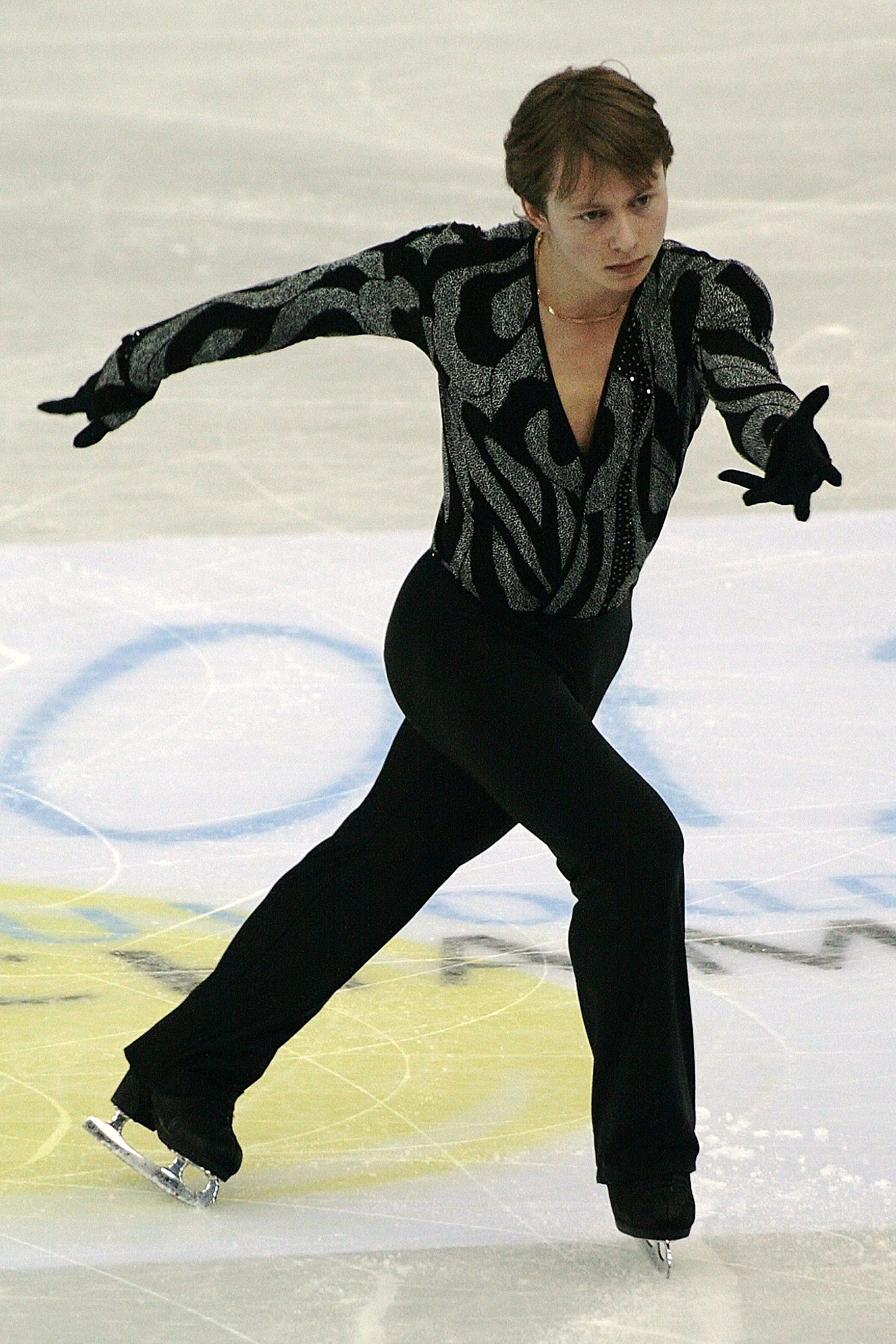
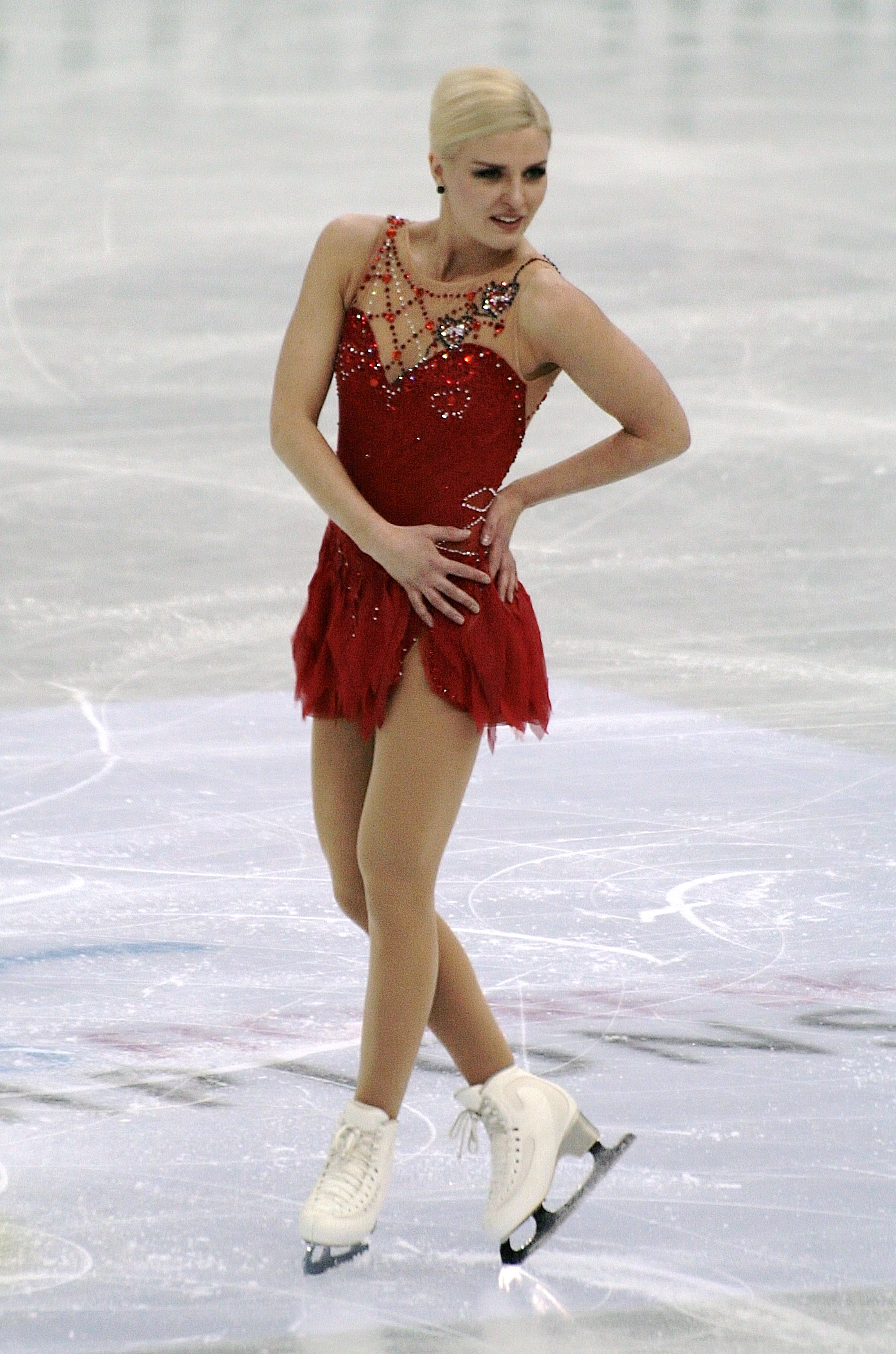
From left to right: Kristoffer Berntsson and Alexander Majorov of Sweden each won six Nordic Championship titles in men's singles; while Viktoria Helgesson of Sweden won five Nordic Championship titles in women's singles.

Records
Discipline	Most championship titles			
Discipline	Skater(s)	No.	Years	Ref.
Men's singles	(Sweden); Kristoffer Berntsson	6	2002–05; 2007; 2010	
Men's singles	(Norway); Per Kjølberg	6	1957–62	
Men's singles	(Sweden); Alexander Majorov	6	2011–14; 2016; 2018	
Women's singles	(Sweden); Viktoria Helgesson	5	2008–11; 2013	
Pairs	(Finland); Ludowika Jakobsson; Walter Jakobsson	3	1919–21	

== Cumulative medal count ==
=== Men's singles ===
Total number of Nordic Championship medals in men's singles by nation
Rank	Nation	Gold	Silver	Bronze	Total
1	Sweden	35	24	28	87
2	Denmark	18	22	15	55
3	Finland	16	27	23	66
4	Norway	10	6	5	21
5	France	1	0	0	1
5	Latvia	1	0	0	1
5	Spain	1	0	0	1
8	Poland	0	1	0	1
9	Estonia	0	0	2	2
10	Australia	0	0	1	1
10	Monaco	0	0	1	1
Totals (11 entries)		82	80	75	237

=== Women's singles ===
Total number of Nordic Championship medals in women's singles by nation
Rank	Nation	Gold	Silver	Bronze	Total
1	Finland	36	27	31	94
2	Sweden	30	26	33	89
3	Norway	11	21	13	45
4	Denmark	3	5	2	10
5	Italy	2	0	0	2
6	Chinese Taipei	0	1	0	1
6	Estonia	0	1	0	1
6	Russia	0	1	0	1
Totals (8 entries)		82	82	79	243

=== Pairs ===
Total number of Nordic Championship medals in pair skating by nation
Rank	Nation	Gold	Silver	Bronze	Total
1	Norway	11	10	1	22
2	Sweden	6	8	7	21
3	Finland	6	3	4	13
4	Denmark	0	0	2	2
Totals (4 entries)		23	21	14	58

=== Ice dance ===
Total number of Nordic Championship medals in ice dance by nation
Rank	Nation	Gold	Silver	Bronze	Total
1	Sweden	2	3	2	7
2	Finland	2	1	0	3
3	Denmark	2	0	0	2
Totals (3 entries)		6	4	2	12

=== Total ===
Total number of Nordic Championship medals by nation
Rank	Nation	Gold	Silver	Bronze	Total
1	Sweden	73	61	70	204
2	Finland	60	58	58	176
3	Norway	32	37	19	88
4	Denmark	23	27	19	69
5	Italy	2	0	0	2
6	France	1	0	0	1
6	Latvia	1	0	0	1
6	Spain	1	0	0	1
9	Estonia	0	1	2	3
10	Chinese Taipei	0	1	0	1
10	Poland	0	1	0	1
10	Russia	0	1	0	1
13	Australia	0	0	1	1
13	Monaco	0	0	1	1
Totals (14 entries)		193	187	170	550
