= Tyyskä =

Tyyskä is a Finnish surname.

== Geographical distribution ==
As of 2014, 96.0% of all known bearers of the surname Tyyskä were residents of Finland (frequency 1:14,277) and 3.5% of Sweden (1:703,340).

In Finland, the frequency of the surname was higher than national average (1:14,277) in the following regions:

1. Southern Savonia (1:3,327)
2. Kymenlaakso (1:5,341)
3. North Ostrobothnia (1:8,135)
4. Central Finland (1:8,368)
5. South Karelia (1:11,472)
6. Uusimaa (1:11,942)
7. Northern Savonia (1:13,112)
8. Päijänne Tavastia (1:13,924)

== People ==
- Samuli Tyyskä (born 1990), Finnish figure skater
