= Alexander Majorov =

Swedish figure skater

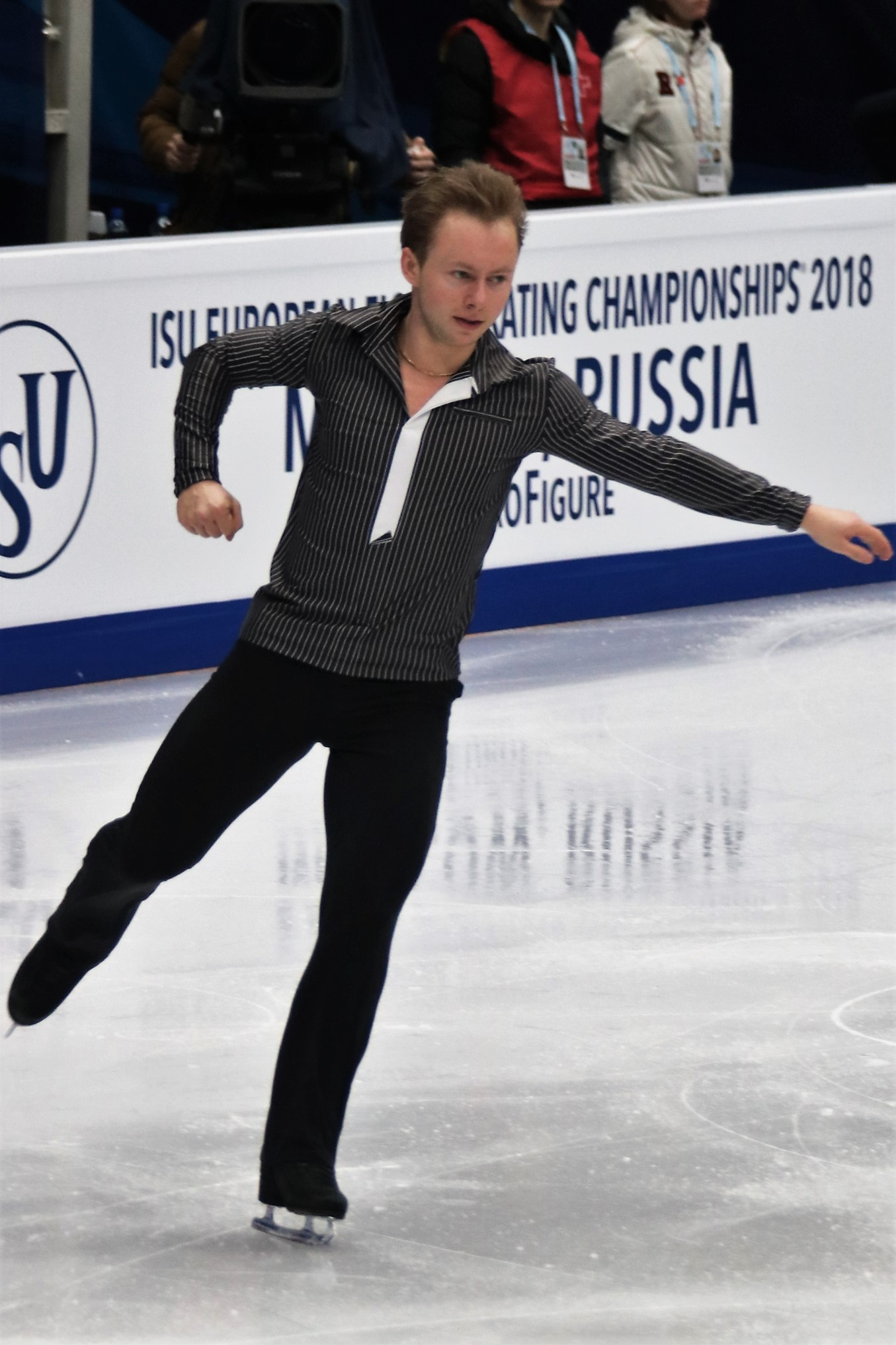

Personal information
- Full name: Alexander Alexandrovich Majorov
- Born: 19 July 1991 (age 35) Leningrad, Russian SFSR, Soviet Union
- Home town: Luleå, Sweden
- Height: 1.68 m (5 ft 6 in)

Figure skating career
- Country: Sweden
- Coach: Alexander Majorov Sr., Irina Majorova
- Skating club: Luleå FCS
- Began skating: 1996
- Retired: March 23, 2019
Medal record
Figure skating: Men's singles
Representing Sweden
Winter Universiade
| Bronze medal – third place | 2017 Almaty | Men's singles |
World Junior Championships
| Bronze medal – third place | 2011 Gangneung | Men's singles |

Alexander Alexandrovich Majorov (Russian: Александр Александрович Майоров, born 19 July 1991) is a Swedish retired figure skater. He is the 2017 Winter Universiade bronze medalist, the 2011 World Junior bronze medalist, a five-time Nordic champion (2011–14 and 2016), and a four-time Swedish national champion (2012–14, 2017). His best finish at the European Championships is 6th (2013). He was 14th at the 2014 Winter Olympics.

== Personal life ==
Majorov was born on 19 July 1991 in Saint Petersburg, Russia. When he was an infant, his family began spending half a year in Sweden and half in Russia, settling in Luleå when he was six years old. His father, Alexander senior, is a figure skating coach, who was the first coach of Alexei Yagudin. His mother, Irina Majorova, runs a dance and ballet school in Luleå. He has a younger brother, Nikolaj, who also competes in figure skating.

Majorov holds dual Swedish and Russian citizenship and speaks both languages. He has a degree in physiotherapy. He is a bone marrow donor for his father, who was diagnosed with severe MDS in June 2015 and acute leukaemia a few months later.

== Career ==
Majorov began competing on the ISU Junior Grand Prix series in 2005. He made his senior international debut at the 2007 Golden Spin of Zagreb, placing 11th, but continued competing also on the junior level.

In the 2009–10 season, Majorov was eighth at the 2010 World Junior Championships and ended his season by winning the senior silver medal at the Triglav Trophy.

In 2010–11, Majorov won his first JGP medal, bronze, at the JGP in Ostrava. He also won two senior events, the Ice Challenge in Graz and the 2010 NRW Trophy. In March 2011, he won the bronze medal at the World Junior Championships. It was Sweden's first ISU Championships medal in 74 years. Majorov had back problems in 2011.

In the 2011–12 season, Majorov finished 11th at the 2012 European Championships and 26th at the 2012 World Championships.

In 2012–13, Majorov was 6th at the 2013 European Championships and 18th at the 2013 World Championships.

In the 2015–16 season, Majorov placed 8th at the 2015 CS Finlandia Trophy and won silver medals at two events – the International Cup of Nice and Volvo Open Cup. To prepare for his father's treatment, one bag of blood was drawn from the skater a week before the Volvo Open Cup and another a week before the 2015 Rostelecom Cup, from which he withdrew. He withdrew from the Swedish Championships to recover after an operation to extract bone marrow for his father. Majorov won gold at the Nordics Open in February 2016. His withdrawal from the 2016 World Championships in Boston followed the detection of a precursor to a stress fracture of the pelvis.

In the 2016–17 season, Majorov competed at the Rostelecom Cup. He had a nosebleed during his free skate and made several errors on his jumps, and he placed last in the men's field. A few weeks later, he won gold at the Warsaw Cup, and he also won the NRW Trophy. In January, he again placed 11th at the European Championships; shortly after, he competed at the 2017 Winter Universiade, where he won the bronze medal and set a new personal best. At the 2017 World Championships, he ended in 23rd place.

== Programs ==
| Season | Short program | Free skating | Exhibition |
|---|---|---|---|
| 2018–19 | Bang Bang by Asaf Avidan | Tina by Randy Edelman; Saint James Infirmary by Hugh Laurie; Cuban Pete by José Norman performed by Jim Carrey | |
| 2017–18 | Bang Bang by Asaf Avidan | The Man with the Golden Arm by Elmer Bernstein; From Russia With Love by John Barry; Peter Gunn Theme by Henry Mancini performed by The Blues Brothers | |
| 2016–17 | Tulipalo hongan juurella by Fredrik Hangasjärvi, Daniel Wikslund; Ievan polkka remix | The Man with the Golden Arm by Elmer Bernstein; From Russia With Love by John Barry; Peter Gunn Theme by Henry Mancini performed by The Blues Brothers | |
| 2015–16 | Tango Emore by Edvin Marton | Archangel (from "Nero") by Thomas Bergersen | |
| 2014–15 | The Great Gig in the Sky by Pink Floyd | Archangel (from "Nero") by Thomas Bergersen | |
| 2013–14 | Korobushka by Bond | Life Begins Again by Afro Celt Sound System; Archangel (from "Nero") by Thomas Bergersen | The Mask |
| 2012–13 | Ray's Blues by Dave Grusin | Life Begins Again by Afro Celt Sound System | |
| 2011–12 | Austin Powers by George S. Clinton; Moonlight Sonata by Ludwig van Beethoven arranged by Marcus Miller | Bolero de Ravel (from Flamenco Fantasy) by Gustavo Montesano | |
| 2010–11 | Austin Powers by George S. Clinton | Polovtsian Dances (from Prince Igor) by Alexander Borodin | |
| 2009–10 | Libertango by Astor Piazzolla | Polovtsian Dances (from Prince Igor) by Alexander Borodin | |
| 2008–09 | Sirtaki by Mikis Theodorakis | Carmen Suite by Georges Bizet, Rodion Shchedrin | |

== Competitive highlights ==
GP: Grand Prix; CS: Challenger Series; JGP: Junior Grand Prix

International
| Event | 05–06 | 06–07 | 07–08 | 08–09 | 09–10 | 10–11 | 11–12 | 12–13 | 13–14 | 14–15 | 15–16 | 16–17 | 17–18 | 18–19 |
|---|---|---|---|---|---|---|---|---|---|---|---|---|---|---|
| Olympics | | | | | | | | | 14th | | | | | |
| Worlds | | | | | | 28th | 26th | 18th | 32nd | 23rd | WD | 23rd | 12th | 18th |
| Europeans | | | | 22nd | | | 11th | 6th | 11th | 11th | 11th | 11th | 7th | 8th |
| GP Cup of China | | | | | | | | | | | | | 10th | |
| GP France | | | | | | | 6th | | 8th | | | | | |
| GP Rostelecom | | | | | | | | | | WD | WD | 12th | | 9th |
| GP Skate America | | | | | | | | 10th | 7th | | | | | |
| GP Skate Canada | | | | | | | 9th | | | WD | | | | 10th |
| CS Finlandia | | | | | | | | | | | 8th | 9th | | 11th |
| CS Golden Spin | | | | | | | | | | | | | 7th | 6th |
| CS Lombardia | | | | | | | | | | | | | 6th | |
| CS Nebelhorn | | | | | | | | | | | | | 3rd | 2nd |
| CS Warsaw Cup | | | | | | | | | | | | 1st | | |
| Coupe Printemps | | | | | | | | | | | | | 1st | |
| Cup of Nice | | | | | | | | | | | 2nd | | | |
| Finlandia Trophy | | | | | | | 4th | | | | | | | |
| Golden Spin | | | 11th | 3rd | | | | | | | | | | |
| Hellmut Seibt | | | | | | | | | | 2nd | | | | |
| Ice Challenge | | | | | | 1st | | | | | | | | |
| Lombardia Trophy | | | | | | | | | 1st | | | | | |
| Merano Cup | | | | | 3rd | | | | | | | | | |
| Nebelhorn Trophy | | | | | | | | 12th | | | | | | |
| New Year's Cup | | | | | | | | 1st | | | | | | |
| Nordics | | | | 2nd | 2nd | 1st | 1st | 1st | 1st | | 1st | | | 2nd |
| NRW Trophy | | | | | | 1st | | | 1st | | | 1st | | |
| Triglav Trophy | | | | | 2nd | | | | | | | | | |
| Volvo Open Cup | | | | | | | | | | | 2nd | | | |
| Warsaw Cup | | | | | | | | 1st | | | | | | |
| Universiade | | | | | | | | | | | | 3rd | | |
International: Junior
| Junior Worlds | | | | 13th | 8th | 3rd | | | | | | | | |
| JGP Croatia | | | 10th | | 4th | | | | | | | | | |
| JGP Czech Rep. | | | | 8th | | 3rd | | | | | | | | |
| JGP Estonia | 15th | | | | | | | | | | | | | |
| JGP Germany | | | 10th | | | | | | | | | | | |
| JGP Japan | | | | | | 5th | | | | | | | | |
| JGP Netherlands | | 9th | | | | | | | | | | | | |
| JGP Romania | | 9th | | | | | | | | | | | | |
| JGP South Africa | | | | 7th | | | | | | | | | | |
| JGP U.S. | | | | | 6th | | | | | | | | | |
| EYOF | | 2nd | | | | | | | | | | | | |
| Nordics | 1st | 1st | | | | | | | | | | | | |
National
| Swedish Champ. | 1st J | 1st J | | 2nd | 3rd | 3rd | 1st | 1st | 1st | WD | WD | 1st | 1st | 1st |

== Detailed results ==
Small medals for short and free programs awarded only at ISU Championships. At team events, medals awarded for team results only.

2018–19 season
| Date | Event | SP | FS | Total |
| March 18–24, 2019 | 2019 World Championships | 17; 79.17 | 17; 150.55 | 18; 229.72 |
| 21–27 January 2019 | 2019 European Championships | 11; 79.88 | 8; 145.50 | 8; 225.38 |
| December 5–8, 2018 | 2018 CS Golden Spin of Zagreb | 5; 83.87 | 7; 143.60 | 6; 227.47 |
| November 16–18, 2018 | 2018 Rostelecom Cup | 3; 82.33 | 10; 123.26 | 9; 205.59 |
| October 26–28, 2018 | 2018 Skate Canada | 6; 84.64 | 12; 135.66 | 10; 220.30 |
| 4–7 October 2018 | 2018 CS Finlandia Trophy | 7; 73.41 | 11; 129.14 | 11; 202.55 |
| 26–29 September 2018 | 2018 CS Nebelhorn Trophy | 2; 78.86 | 2; 147.78 | 2; 226.64 |
2017–18 season
| Date | Event | SP | FS | Total |
| 19–25 March 2018 | 2018 World Championships | 10; 82.71 | 13; 155.08 | 12; 237.79 |
| 15–21 January 2018 | 2018 European Championships | 12; 71.28 | 7; 154.58 | 7; 225.86 |
| 6–9 December 2017 | 2017 CS Golden Spin of Zagreb | 7; 75.23 | 7; 148.00 | 7; 223.23 |
| 3–5 November 2017 | 2017 Cup of China | 11; 64.27 | 10; 121.77 | 10; 186.04 |
| 27 – 30 September 2017 | 2017 CS Nebelhorn Trophy | 3; 77.71 | 5; 148.03 | 3; 225.04 |
| 14–17 September 2017 | 2017 CS Lombardia Trophy | 4; 80.85 | 7; 137.93 | 6; 218.78 |
2016–17 season
| Date | Event | SP | FS | Total |
| 29 March – 2 April 2017 | 2017 World Championships | 18; 77.73 | 23; 127.81 | 23; 205.04 |
| 1–5 February 2017 | 2017 Winter Universiade | 6; 81.01 | 2; 165.55 | 3; 246.56 |
| 25–29 January 2017 | 2017 European Championships | 7; 78.87 | 12; 139.11 | 11; 217.98 |
| 14–18 December 2016 | 2017 Swedish Championships | 1; 78.90 | 1; 150.07 | 1; 228.97 |
| 4–6 November 2016 | 2016 Rostelecom Cup | 11; 67.80 | 12; 124.34 | 12; 192.14 |
| 6–10 October 2016 | 2016 CS Finlandia Trophy | 12; 56.06 | 7; 137.72 | 9; 193.78 |
