= Ann-Margreth Frei =

Swedish figure skater

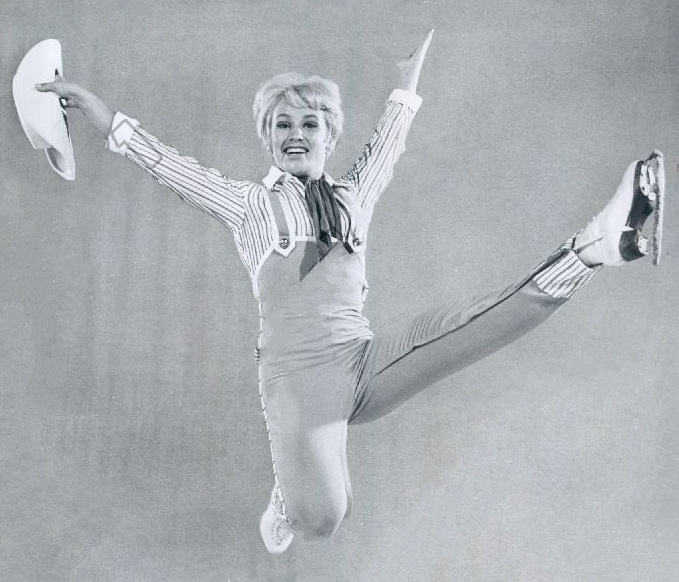
- Frei with Ice Capades in 1968

Personal information
- Other names: Ann-Margreth Frei-Käck; Ann-Margreth Frei-Hall
- Born: March 20, 1942 (age 84) Kalmar, Sweden
- Height: 1.55 m (5 ft 1 in)

Figure skating career
- Country: Sweden
- Skating club: IF Castor, Östersund
- Retired: c. 1964

Ann-Margreth Frei (born March 20, 1942), also known as Frei-Käck or Frei-Hall, is a Swedish former competitive figure skater. She is a two-time Nordic champion and a three-time Swedish national champion. She competed for Sweden at the 1964 Winter Olympics in Innsbruck, placing 21st.

Frei lived in Switzerland from the age of six to 18. As of 2016, she is a coach at the Skating Club of Vail in Vail, Colorado.

== Competitive highlights ==
International
Event	1961–62	1962–63	1963–64
Winter Olympics			21st
World Champ.	17th	16th	20th
European Champ.	15th	12th	13th
Nordics	2nd	1st	1st
National
Swedish Champ.	1st	1st	1st
