= Margot Moe =

Norwegian figure skater

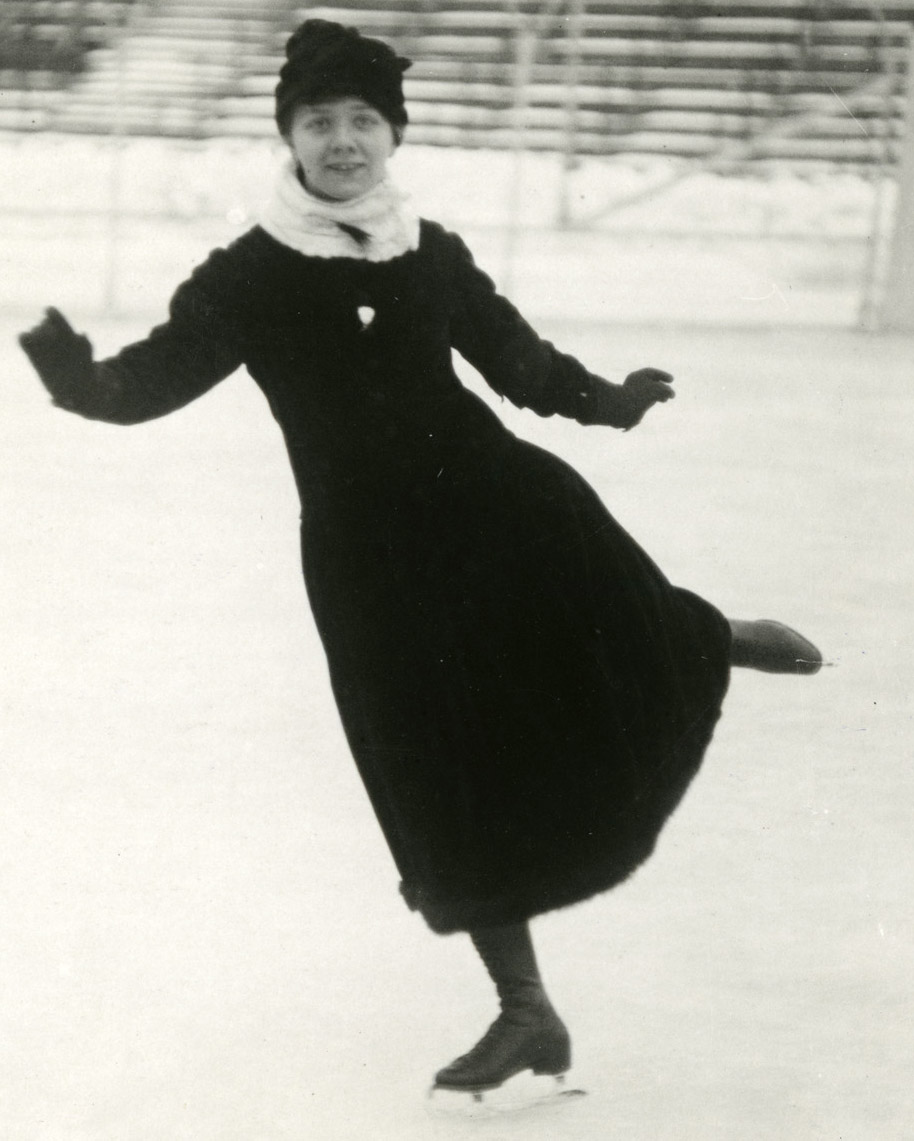

Personal information
- Born: 15 March 1899 Oslo, Norway
- Died: 12 March 1988 (aged 88) Oslo, Norway

Figure skating career
- Country: Norway
Medal record
Representing Norway
Ladies' Figure skating
World Championships
Bronze medal – third place	1922 Davos	Ladies' singles

Margot Gudrun Moe (3 March 1899 in Oslo – 12 March 1988 in Oslo) was a Norwegian figure skater. She competed at the 1920 Summer Olympics in Antwerp where she placed fifth, and won a bronze medal at the 1922 World Figure Skating Championships.

== Results ==
Event	1919	1920	1921	1922	1923
Olympic Games		5th			
World Championships				3rd	
Nordic Championships			3rd		
Norwegian Championships	1st	1st	1st	1st	1st
