= Henriikka Hietaniemi =

Finnish figure skater

Personal information
- Full name: Henriikka Hietaniemi
- Born: 26 May 1987 (age 39) Helsinki, Finland
- Height: 1.60 m (5 ft 3 in)

Figure skating career
- Country: Finland
- Coach: Tiiu Valgemäe; Susanna Malinen
- Skating club: Myllypuron FSC

Henriikka Hietaniemi (born 26 May 1987) is a Finnish former competitive figure skater. She is the 2006 Cup of Nice silver medalist and 2009 Nordic bronze medalist.

== Programs ==
Season	Short program	Free skating
2004–2005	Libertango by Astor Piazzolla	Giselle by Adolphe Adam

== Competitive highlights ==
International
Event	03–04	04–05	05–06	06–07	07–08	08–09	09–10	10–11	11–12	12–13
Challenge Cup									15th	
Cup of Nice				2nd	10th	15th				
Golden Spin					14th	10th				
Nordics			5th	7th	4th	3rd	8th	8th		
Ondrej Nepela				4th	9th					
Universiade				18th						
International: Junior
JGP Croatia			15th							
JGP Japan			15th							
Golden Bear		1st J.								
Merano Cup	7th J.	6th J.								
Nordics		7th J.								
Skate Helena	3rd J.									
National
Finnish Champ.	4th J.	2nd J.	5th	6th	4th	5th	6th	7th	5th	9th
J. = Junior level; JGP = Junior Grand Prix
