= Angelica Olsson =

Swedish figure skater

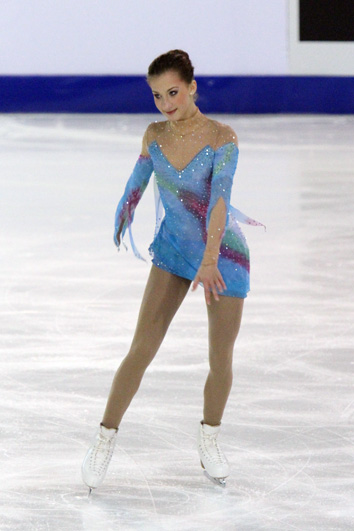
- Angelica Olsson at the 2010 Junior World Championships

Personal information
- Born: 27 November 1991 (age 34) Karlskrona, Sweden
- Height: 1.61 m (5 ft 3 1/2 in)

Figure skating career
- Country: Sweden
- Coach: Susanne Olsson
- Skating club: Mörrums SC
- Began skating: 1994
- Retired: 2012

Angelica Olsson (born 27 November 1991) is a Swedish former competitive figure skater. She is the 2010 Nordic silver medalist and a two-time Swedish national bronze medalist. She was sent to the 2009 World Junior Championships in Sofia, Bulgaria but did not qualify for the free skating segment. At the 2010 World Junior Championships in The Hague, Netherlands, she placed 12th in the short program, 19th in the free skating, and 17th overall. She is the daughter of a figure skating coach, Susanne Olsson, and the elder sister of figure skater Isabelle Olsson.

== Programs ==
Season	Short program	Free skating
2011–2012	Speed by Mark Mancina	Mahogany by Michael Masser
2010–2011	Northern Light by Benny Andersson	Mahogany by Michael Masser
2009–2010	Northern Light by Benny Andersson	Powerful Angel (from Evan Almighty) by John Debney
2008–2009	U Plavu Zoru performed by Pink Martini	Evan Almighty by John Debney

== Competitive highlights ==
JGP: Junior Grand Prix

International
Event	2006–07	2007–08	2008–09	2009–10	2010–11	2011–12	2012–13
Challenge Cup			8th				
Crystal Skate						16th	
Cup of Nice				19th			
Finlandia Trophy						9th	
Nepela Trophy						11th	
Nordics		3rd J.	4th	2nd			
Schäfer Memorial			10th				
Triglav Trophy				8th			
International: Junior
Junior Worlds			32nd	17th			
JGP Belarus			21st				
JGP Croatia				15th			
JGP Czech Republic			16th				
JGP Japan					13th		
JGP United States				17th			
EYOF	11th						
Warsaw Cup				8th J.			
National
Swedish Champ.		5th J.	3rd	3rd		6th	WD
J. = Junior level; WD = Withdrew
