= Michael Chrolenko =

Norwegian figure skater (born 1988)

Personal information
- Born: 19 July 1988 (age 38) Trondheim, Norway
- Height: 1.74 m (5 ft 8 1/2 in)

Figure skating career
- Country: Norway
- Coach: Marek Chrolenko
- Skating club: Trondheim Skating Club
- Began skating: 1994
- Retired: 2008

Michael Chrolenko (born 19 July 1988) is a Norwegian figure skater. He is the 2006-2007 Norwegian National Champion and the 2003-2005 Norwegian Junior National Champion. He has competed four times at the World Junior Figure Skating Championships and once at the European Figure Skating Championships. He is the 2005 Nordic Championships champion on the junior-level.

Chrolenko is coached by his father, Marek Chrolenko, who is a former Polish national pairs champion who placed 7th at the European Championships in 1977.

Chrolenko competed at the Swedish national championships for competitive experience.

== Programs ==
Season	Short program	Free skating
2007–08	Nothing Else Matters by Metallica performed by Apocalyptica	Spirit (soundtrack); The Rock (soundtrack) by Hans Zimmer

== Competitive highlights ==
International
Event	2002–03	2003–04	2004–05	2005–06	2006–07	2007–08
Worlds						26th
Europeans				27th	26th	
Nordics		2nd J.	1st J.	8th	4th	3rd
International: Junior
Junior Worlds	31st	32nd	23rd	25th	23rd	28th
JGP Estonia						17th
JGP Hungary			17th			
JGP Poland				17th		
JGP Slovenia		20th				
JGP Ukraine			15th			
Warsaw Cup		5th J.		4th J.		
Skate Helena		1st J.				
National
Norwegian	1st J.	1st J.	1st J.	1st	1st	
J. = Junior level; JGP = Junior Grand Prix
