= Johanna Götesson =

Swedish figure skater

Personal information
- Born: 3 July 1985 (age 41) Tibro, Västra Götaland County
- Height: 1.64 m (5 ft 5 in)

Figure skating career
- Country: Sweden
- Skating club: Tibro KK
- Began skating: 1991
- Retired: 2004

Johanna Götesson (born 3 July 1985) is a Swedish former competitive figure skater. She is the 2003 Nordic bronze medalist and 2004 Swedish national champion. She placed 29th at the 2003 World Championships and 35th at the 2001 World Junior Championships.

== Programs ==
Season	Short program	Free skating
2003–2004	La cumparsita by Gerardo Matos Rodríguez performed by Richard Clayderman	Romeo and Juliet by Sergei Prokofiev Orchestra Andre Rieu; The Montagues and the Capulets by Sergei Prokofiev Philharmonic Slavonica Orchestra
2002–2003	La cumparsita by Gerardo Matos Rodríguez performed by Richard Clayderman	Caravan by Duke Ellington London Symphony Orchestra; Echoes of Harlem (Blues) by Duke Ellington Rochester Pops Orchestra; In a Sentimental Mood by Duke Ellington Rochester Pops Orchestra; Sing Sing Sing by Louis Prima Charlie Calello Orchestra
2000–2001	Memory (from Cats) by Andrew Lloyd Webber	More Dirty Dancing by Jimmy Inner; Time of my Life John Morris Orchestra; Wipe Out by The Surfaris

== Competitive highlights ==
JGP: Junior Grand Prix

International
Event	98–99	99–00	00–01	01–02	02–03	03–04
Worlds					29th	
Nordics					3rd	
Copenhagen					3rd	
International: Junior
Junior Worlds			35th			
JGP Czech Rep.						4th
JGP Poland						9th
JGP Ukraine			12th			
Nordics			3rd J.	1st J.		
National
Swedish Champ.	2nd J.	1st J.	1st J.		2nd	1st
J. = Junior level
