= Antti Kontiola =

Finnish figure skater

Figure skating career
- Country: Finland
- Retired: 1984

Antti Kontiola is a Finnish former competitive figure skater. He is a three-time Nordic champion and six-time Finnish national champion. He placed 16th at the 1980 European Championships.

== Competitive highlights ==
International
Event	1978	1979	1980	1981	1982	1983	1984
European Champ.		20th	16th				
Nordics	2nd	2nd	1st	1st	1st		2nd
National
Finnish Champ.	1st	1st	1st	1st		1st	1st
