= Sanna-Maija Wiksten =

Finnish figure skater

Personal information
- Born: 28 July 1980 (age 46) Espoo, Finland
- Height: 1.63 m (5 ft 4 in)

Figure skating career
- Country: Finland
- Coach: Kim Jacobson, Pierre Trente, Annick Gailhaguet, Virpi Horttana
- Skating club: Tikkurilan Skating Club; Espoon Jäätaiturit
- Began skating: 1986
- Retired: 2000

Sanna-Maija Wiksten (born 28 July 1980) is a Finnish former competitive figure skater. She is the 1998 Nordic champion, 1999 Nebelhorn Trophy silver medalist, and 1999 Finnish national champion. She reached the free skate at three ISU Championships – 1997 Junior Worlds, 1999 Europeans, and 2000 Europeans. She represented Tikkurilan Skating Club in Vantaa and Espoon Jäätaiturit in Espoo.

== Programs ==
Season	Short program	Free skating
1999–2000		Basic Instinct by Jerry Goldsmith

== Competitive highlights ==
GP: Grand Prix; JGP: Junior Grand Prix

International
Event	95–96	96–97	97–98	98–99	99–00
Europeans		28th		23rd	17th
GP Lalique					5th
Finlandia Trophy				6th	9th
Nebelhorn Trophy				2nd	
Nordics		3rd	1st	2nd	
St. Gervais		11th			
DSU Cup				1st	
International: Junior
Junior Worlds		17th			
JGP France				6th	
Blue Swords		17th J			
Gardena			4th J		
Piruetten	1st J				
National
Finnish Champ.	1st J	2nd	5th	1st	4th
J: Junior level
