= Josefin Taljegård =

Swedish figure skater (born 1995)

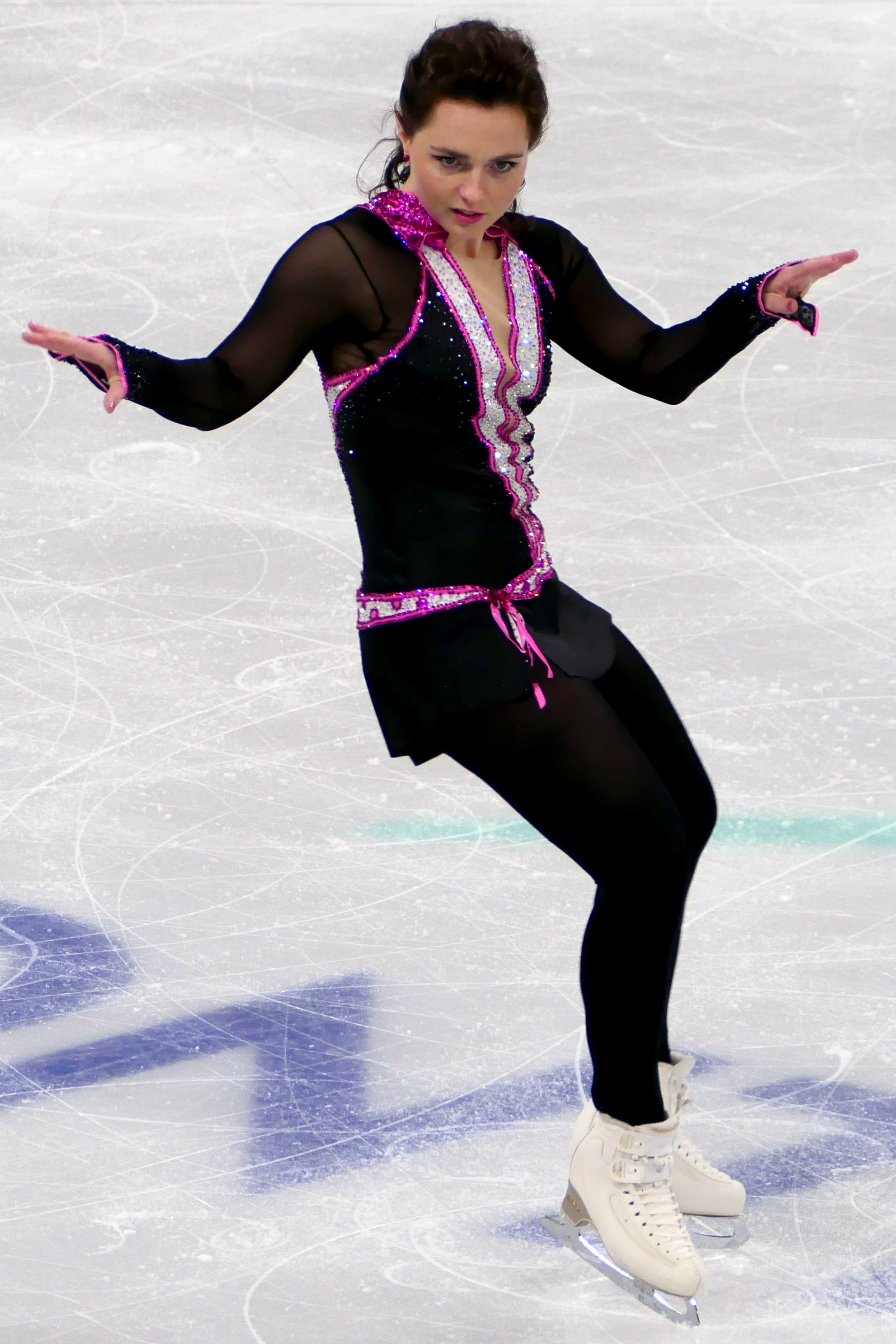
- Josefin Taljegård at the 2024 World Championships

Personal information
- Born: 26 August 1995 (age 31) Mölndal, Sweden
- Height: 1.57 m (5 ft 2 in)

Figure skating career
- Country: Sweden
- Discipline: Women's singles
- Coach: Maria Taljegård; Malin Taljegård
- Skating club: Göteborgs Konståkningsklubb
- Began skating: 1998
- Retired: 15 April 2026

Medal record
Swedish Championships
Gold medal – first place	2022 Borlänge Falun	Singles
Gold medal – first place	2024 Norrköping	Singles
Gold medal – first place	2025 Västerås	Singles
Gold medal – first place	2026 Landskrona	Singles
Silver medal – second place	2020 Ulricehamn	Singles
Silver medal – second place	2023 Borås	Singles
Bronze medal – third place	2018 Skellefteå	Singles
Bronze medal – third place	2019 Karlskrona	Singles

Josefin Taljegård (born 26 August 1995) is a Swedish retired figure skater. She has won 17 senior international medals, including gold at the 2024 Nordics championships, and is a four-time Swedish national champion (2022, 2024-26), a three-time Swedish national silver medalist (2020, 2025), and a two-time Swedish national bronze medalist (2018, 2019).

She represented Sweden at nine ISU Championships and the 2022 Winter Olympics.

Taljegård is coached by her sisters, Maria and Malin.

She announced her retirement from competitive skating on 15 April 2026 via Instagram.

== Programs ==
Season	Short program	Free skating	Exhibition
2025–26	Survivor by Destiny's Child performed by 2WEI & Edda Hayes choreo. by Josefin Taljegård, Denny Hultén	It's All Coming Back to Me Now by Celine Dion choreo. by Nikolai Morozov, Josefin Taljegård	
2024–25	Wicked Game performed by Ursine Vulpine, Annaca, Chris Isaak choreo. by Nikolai Morozov, Josefin Taljegård	It's All Coming Back to Me Now by Celine Dion choreo. by Nikolai Morozov, Josefin Taljegård	
2023–24	Wicked Game performed by Ursine Vulpine, Annaca, Chris Isaak choreo. by Nikolai Morozov, Josefin Taljegård	Heartbreak Hotel by Elvis Presley performed by Heidi Feek; Trouble by Elvis Presley performed by Austin Butler; Jailhouse Rock by Elvis Presley choreo. by Nikolai Morozov	I Got Life (from Hair) performed by Galt MacDermot & Tom Pierson
2022–23	Ready or Not performed by Mischa "Book" Chillak & Esthero; Ready Or Not Here I Come by District 78 & Cheesa choreo. by Nikolai Morozov	Heartbreak Hotel by Elvis Presley performed by Heidi Feek; Trouble by Elvis Presley performed by Austin Butler; Jailhouse Rock by Elvis Presley choreo. by Nikolai Morozov	
2021–22	Ready or Not performed by Mischa "Book" Chillak & Esthero; Ready Or Not Here I Come by District 78 & Cheesa choreo. by Nikolai Morozov	Bathroom Dance; Call Me Joker (from Joker) by Stórsveit Nix Noltes; Rock and Roll, Part 2 by Gary Glitter choreo. by Nikolai Morozov	
2020–21	El Tango de Roxanne (from Moulin Rouge!) performed by Ewan McGregor	Bathroom Dance; Call Me Joker (from Joker) by Stórsveit Nix Noltes; Rock and Roll, Part 2 by Gary Glitter choreo. by Nikolai Morozov	Dancing Queen; Take a Chance on Me by ABBA
2019–20	El Tango de Roxanne (from Moulin Rouge!) performed by Ewan McGregor	Concierto de Aranjuez by Joaquín Rodrigo performed by Paco de Lucía, Orquesta de Cadaqués	
2018–19	Do You Only Wanna Dance performed by Cucco Peña, Julio Daviel Big Band; Do You Only Wanna Dance performed by Mya; Hips Don't Lie performed by Shakira	Concierto de Aranjuez by Joaquín Rodrigo performed by Paco de Lucía, Orquesta de Cadaqués	
2017–18	Do You Only Wanna Dance performed by Cucco Peña, Julio Daviel Big Band; Do You Only Wanna Dance performed by Mya	Don't You Worry Child performed by The Piano Guys, Shweta Subram; Don't You Worry Child performed by Madilyn Bailey; Don't You Worry Child performed by Robert Mendoza; Don't You Worry Child performed by Madilyn Bailey	
2013–14	West Side Story by Leonard Bernstein	New York, New York by John Kander, Fred Ebb	
2012–13	West Side Story by Leonard Bernstein	Once Upon a Time in the West by Ennio Morricone	
2011–12	One by James Hetfield, Lars Ulrich	Alexander by Vangelis	
2009–10	Don Juan DeMarco by Michael Kamen	Romeo and Juliet by Sergei Prokofiev; Romeo and Juliet Suite by Nino Rota	

== Competitive highlights ==
- JGP – Event of the ISU Junior Grand Prix Series
- CS – Event of the ISU Challenger Series
- TBD – Assigned
- WD – Withdrew from competition

Competition placements at senior level
Season	2013–14	2016–17	2017–18	2018–19	2019–20	2020–21	2021–22	2022–23	2023–24	2024–25	2025–26
Winter Olympics							25th				
World Championships						15th	21st		19th		
European Championships							13th	17th	11th	17th	16th
Swedish Championships		5th	3rd	3rd	2nd		1st	2nd	1st	1st	1st
CS Autumn Classic				13th							
CS Finlandia Trophy					10th		13th	8th	9th		
CS Golden Spin of Zagreb							12th				
CS Ice Star					6th						
CS Lombardia Trophy					14th						11th
CS Nebelhorn Trophy						5th	6th				
CS Tallinn Trophy										12th	7th
CS U.S. Classic				13th							
Bavarian Open	15th	6th	6th								
Bellu Memorial										2nd	
Challenge Cup					13th			8th			
Coupe du Printemps				1st							
Cup of Tyrol				9th							
Egna Spring Trophy				5th							
Merano Cup			5th								
Nordic Championships			3rd	4th	6th			4th	1st	3rd	6th
NRW Trophy						2nd	3rd				
Oceania International											1st
Road to 26 Trophy										6th	
Skate to Milano											9th
Tallink Hotels Cup						3rd		2nd		1st	3rd
Tallinn Trophy					9th		1st	1st	2nd		
Trophée Métropole Nice			7th					6th			
Volvo Open Cup									1st	1st	2nd
Warsaw Cup				10th							
Winter Universiade		15th									

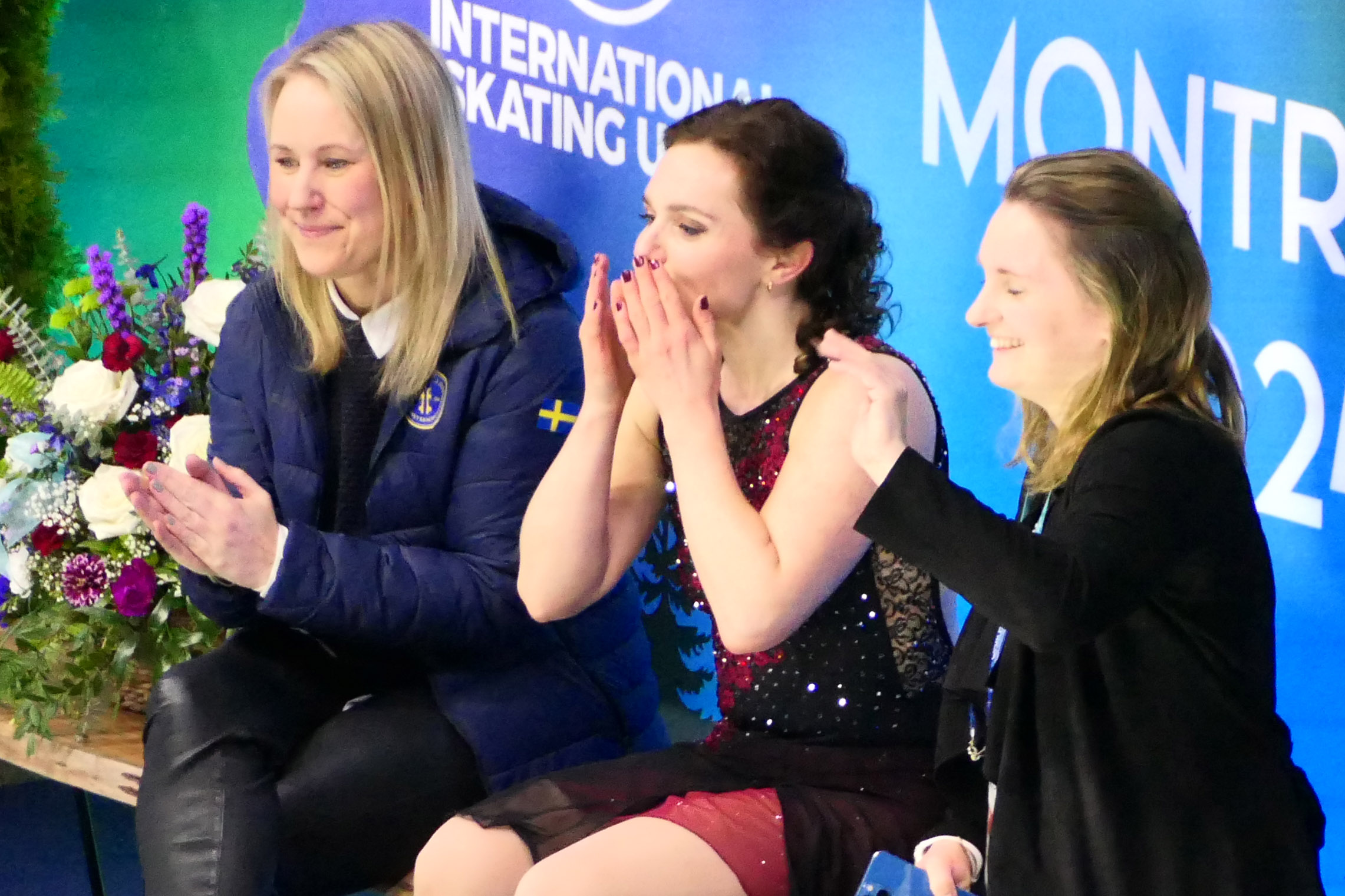
Taljegård in the "Kiss and cry" at the 2024 World Championships

Competition placements at junior level
Season	2009–10	2010–11	2011–12	2012–13	2013–14	2014–15
World Junior Championships				24th		
Swedish Championships	4th	3rd	3rd	2nd	2nd	3rd
JGP Belarus					16th	
JGP Croatia				7th		
JGP Czech Republic		20th				
JGP Latvia			9th			
JGP Mexico					14th	
JGP Poland	12th					
JGP United States				10th		
Challenge Cup					6th	
Coupe du Printemps			3rd			
Cup of Nice	14th		4th			5th
Hellmut Seibt Memorial				3rd		
Nordic Championships	7th	4th	4th	2nd	9th	
NRW Trophy		11th				

== Detailed results ==
ISU personal best scores in the +5/-5 GOE System
Segment	Type	Score	Event
Total	TSS	178.10	2021 World Championships
Short program	TSS	61.58	2021 World Championships
Short program	TES	32.98	2021 World Championships
Short program	PCS	29.31	2024 World Championships
Free skating	TSS	116.52	2021 World Championships
Free skating	TES	57.85	2021 World Championships
Free skating	PCS	58.67	2021 World Championships

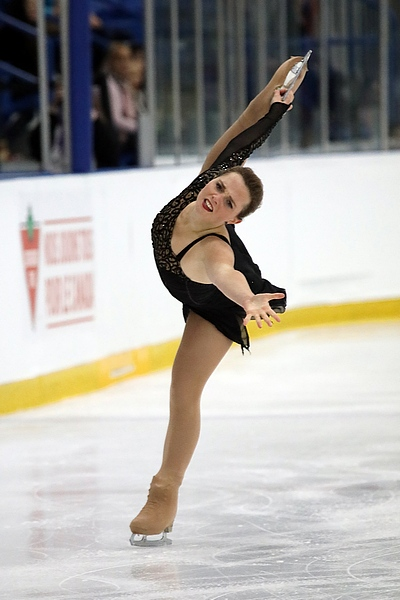
Taljegård performing a spiral at the 2018 Autumn Classic

=== Senior level ===
Results in the 2013-14 season
Date	Event	SP		FS		Total	
Date	Event	P	Score	P	Score	P	Score
Jan 29 – Feb 2, 2014	(Germany) 2014 Bavarian Open	11	41.05	17	59.87	15	100.92

Results in the 2016-17 season
Date	Event	SP		FS		Total	
Date	Event	P	Score	P	Score	P	Score
Dec 14–18, 2016	(Sweden) 2016 Swedish Championships	6	44.83	5	75.30	5	120.13
Jan 31 – Feb 5, 2017	(Kazakhstan) 2017 Winter Universiade	15	42.96	15	78.51	15	121.47
Feb 14–19, 2017	(Germany) 2017 Bavarian Open	7	49.94	6	98.02	6	147.96

Results in the 2017-18 season
Date	Event	SP		FS		Total	
Date	Event	P	Score	P	Score	P	Score
Oct 11–15, 2017	(France) 2017 International Cup of Nice	7	50.28	7	88.97	7	139.25
Nov 15–19, 2017	(Italy) 2017 Merano Cup	7	44.94	4	87.08	5	132.02
Dec 13–17, 2017	(Sweden) 2017 Swedish Championships	2	51.22	4	83.49	3	134.71
Jan 26–31, 2018	(Germany) 2018 Bavarian Open	9	40.31	4	98.92	6	139.23
Feb 1–4, 2018	(Finland) 2018 Nordic Championships	3	55.26	2	98.32	3	153.58

Results in the 2018-19 season
Date	Event	SP		FS		Total	
Date	Event	P	Score	P	Score	P	Score
Sep 12–16, 2018	(United States) 2018 CS U.S. International Classic	14	38.58	13	71.86	13	110.44
Sep 20–22, 2018	(Canada) 2018 CS Autumn Classic International	13	47.32	11	80.64	13	127.96
Nov 23–25, 2018	(Poland) 2018 Warsaw Cup	16	38.45	6	82.76	10	121.21
Dec 12–16, 2018	(Sweden) 2018 Swedish Championships	5	47.42	3	91.74	3	139.16
Feb 7–10, 2019	(Sweden) 2019 Nordic Championships	3	51.06	5	94.84	4	145.90
Feb 26 – Mar 3, 2019	(Austria) 2019 Cup of Tyrol	11	47.37	8	88.10	9	135.47
Mar 15–17, 2019	(Luxembourg) 2019 Coupe du Printemps	1	53.01	1	90.02	1	143.03
Mar 28–31, 2019	(Italy) 2019 Egna Spring Trophy	8	49.24	5	101.09	5	150.33

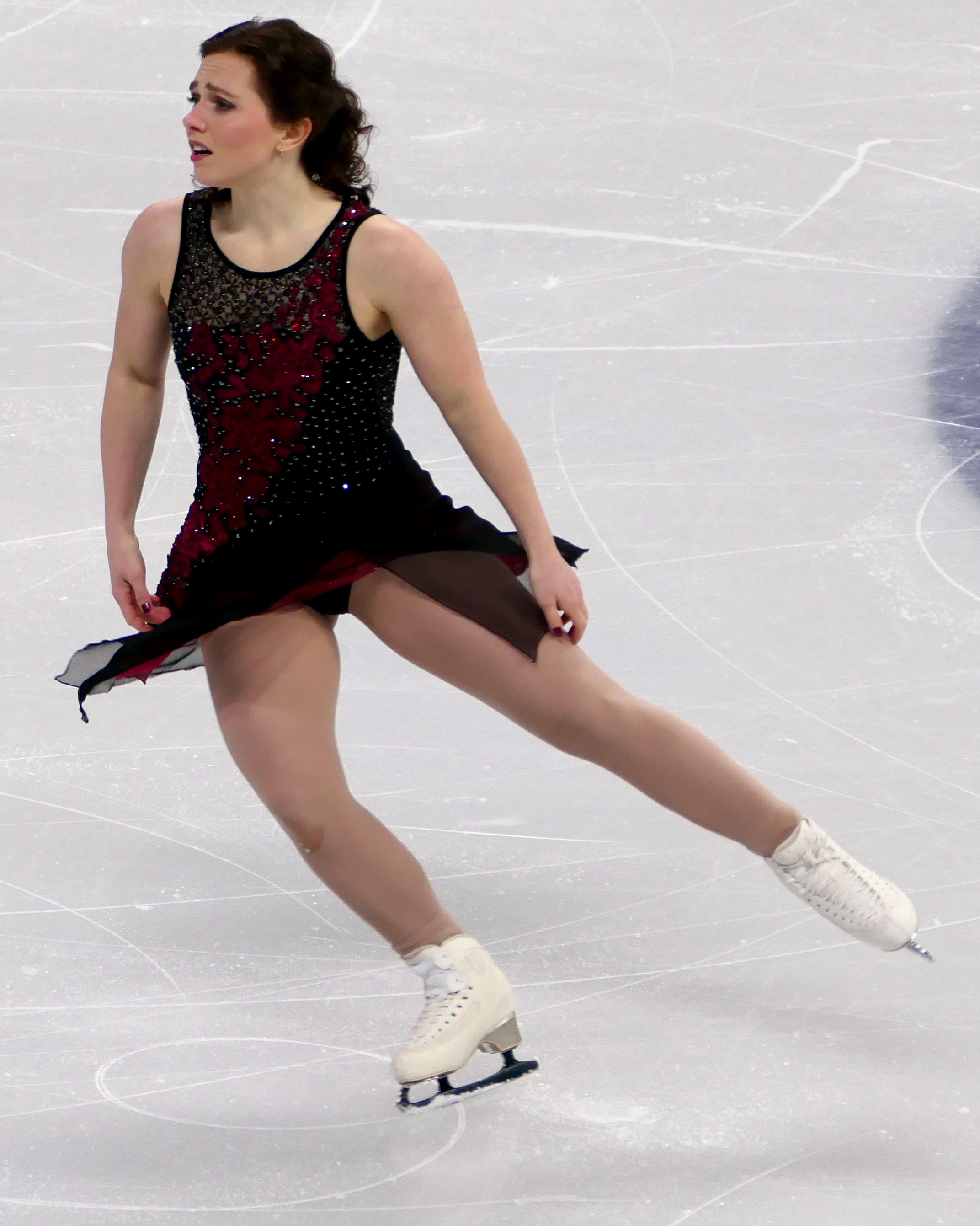
Taljegard at the 2024 World Championships

Results in the 2019-20 season
Date	Event	SP		FS		Total	
Date	Event	P	Score	P	Score	P	Score
Sep 13–15, 2019	(Italy) 2019 CS Lombardia Trophy	12	47.24	14	82.32	14	129.56
Oct 11–13, 2019	(Finland) 2019 CS Finlandia Trophy	8	51.28	12	92.46	10	143.74
Oct 18–20, 2019	(Belarus) 2019 CS Ice Star	9	51.47	6	95.13	6	146.60
Nov 11–17, 2019	(Estonia) 2019 Tallinn Trophy	7	50.87	11	92.63	9	143.50
Dec 12–15, 2019	(Sweden) 2019 Swedish Championships	3	51.18	3	90.73	2	141.91
Feb 5–9, 2020	(Norway) 2020 Nordic Championships	3	55.87	7	90.83	6	146.70
Feb 20–23, 2020	(Denmark) 2020 International Challenge Cup	13	51.37	10	98.75	13	150.12

Results in the 2020-21 season
Date	Event	SP		FS		Total	
Date	Event	P	Score	P	Score	P	Score
Sep 23–26, 2020	(Germany) 2020 CS Nebelhorn Trophy	5	56.19	7	95.35	5	151.54
Nov 26–29, 2020	(Germany) 2020 NRW Trophy	2	55.73	2	96.40	2	152.13
Feb 18–21, 2021	(Estonia) 2021 Tallink Hotels Cup	3	58.72	3	109.46	3	168.18
Mar 22–28, 2021	(Sweden) 2021 World Championships	15	61.58	16	116.52	15	178.10

Results in the 2021-22 season
Date	Event	SP		FS		Total	
Date	Event	P	Score	P	Score	P	Score
Sep 21–25, 2021	(Germany) 2021 CS Nebelhorn Trophy	9	54.96	6	111.09	6	166.05
Oct 7–10, 2021	(Finland) 2021 CS Finlandia Trophy	17	56.36	13	108.20	13	164.56
Nov 4–7, 2021	(Germany) 2021 NRW Trophy	4	54.,92	4	98.15	3	153.07
Nov 16–21, 2021	(Estonia) 2021 Tallinn Trophy	1	59.17	1	123.07	1	182.24
Dec 8–11, 2021	(Croatia) 2021 CS Golden Spin of Zagreb	11	53.04	14	89.98	12	143.02
Jan 10–16, 2022	(Estonia) 2022 European Championships	18	58.24	15	106.06	14	164.30
Feb 15–17, 2022	(China) 2022 Winter Olympics	25	54.51	—N/a	—N/a	25	54.51
Mar 21–27, 2022	(France) 2022 World Championships	21	57.52	21	105.72	21	163.24
Apr 7–10, 2022	(Sweden) 2022 Swedish Championships	1	60.57	1	118.61	1	179.18

Results in the 2022-23 season
Date	Event	SP		FS		Total	
Date	Event	P	Score	P	Score	P	Score
Oct 5–9, 2022	(Finland) 2022 CS Finlandia Trophy	5	59.51	9	104.25	8	163.76
Oct 18–23, 2022	(France) 2022 Trophée Métropole Nice Côte d'Azur	6	49.90	6	97.31	6	147.21
Nov 24–27, 2022	(Estonia) 2022 Tallinn Trophy	4	54.92	4	98.15	3	153.07
Dec 15–18, 2022	(Sweden) 2023 Swedish Championships	1	58.52	2	97.78	2	156.30
Jan 23–29, 2023	(Finland) 2023 European Championships	12	55.53	16	99.45	17	154.98
Feb 1–5, 2023	(Iceland) 2023 Nordic Championships	2	58.00	3	107.98	4	165.98
Feb 16–19, 2023	(Estonia) 2023 Tallink Hotels Cup	3	60.76	2	114.99	2	175.75
Feb 23–26, 2023	(Netherlands) 2023 International Challenge Cup	5	61.01	8	109.67	8	170.68

Results in the 2023-24 season
Date	Event	SP		FS		Total	
Date	Event	P	Score	P	Score	P	Score
Oct 4–8, 2023	(Finland) 2023 CS Finlandia Trophy	8	56.88	10	98.31	9	155.19
Nov 2–5, 2023	(Latvia) 50th Volvo Open Cup	1	62.15	2	110.48	1	172.63
Nov 21–24, 2023	(Estonia) 2023 Tallinn Trophy	1	62.66	2	113.54	2	176.20
Dec 14–16, 2023	(Sweden) 2024 Swedish Championships	1	56.63	1	121.11	1	181.74
Jan 8–14, 2024	(Lithuania) 2024 European Championships	3	57.33	12	107.70	11	165.03
Feb 1–4, 2024	(Sweden) 2024 Nordic Championships	1	61.67	3	101.83	1	163.50
Mar 18–24, 2024	(Canada) 2024 World Championships	15	61.55	20	105.92	19	167.47

Results in the 2024–25 season
Date	Event	SP		FS		Total	
Date	Event	P	Score	P	Score	P	Score
Oct 31 – Nov 3, 2024	(Latvia) 52nd Volvo Open Cup	1	60.17	2	99.80	1	159.97
Nov 11–17, 2024	(Estonia) 2024 CS Tallinn Trophy	13	45.03	11	88.78	12	133.81
Dec 12–15, 2024	(Sweden) 2025 Swedish Championships	1	61.09	1	103.88	1	164.97
Jan 28 – Feb 2, 2025	(Estonia) 2025 European Championships	15	53.04	17	96.55	17	149.59
Feb 6–9, 2025	(Norway) 2025 Nordic Championships	1	58.60	4	99.47	3	158.07
Feb 13–16, 2025	(Estonia) 2025 Tallink Hotels Cup	2	56.71	1	109.95	1	166.66
Feb 19–20, 2025	(Italy) 2025 Road to 26 Trophy	4	57.07	6	108.04	6	165.11
Feb 19–23, 2025	(Romania) 2025 Bellu Memorial	1	61.81	2	110.34	2	172.15

Results in the 2025–26 season
Date	Event	SP		FS		Total	
Date	Event	P	Score	P	Score	P	Score
Sep 11–14, 2025	(Italy) 2025 CS Lombardia Trophy	11	54.89	12	99.25	11	154.14
Sep 18–21, 2025	(China) 2025 Skate to Milano	9	54.19	9	100.42	9	154.61
Nov 5–9, 2025	(Latvia) 2025 Volvo Open Cup	1	60.55	2	105.78	2	166.33
Nov 25–30, 2025	(Estonia) 2025 CS Tallinn Trophy	8	55.09	7	103.05	7	158.14
Dec 12–14, 2025	(Sweden) 2026 Swedish Championships	1	59.30	1	116.47	1	175.77
Jan 13–18, 2026	(United Kingdom) 2026 European Championships	23	50.44	14	106.55	16	156.99
Jan 28 – Feb 1, 2026	(Denmark) 2026 Nordic Championships	3	52.97	7	85.29	6	138.26
Feb 19-22, 2026	(Estonia) 2026 Tallink Hotels Cup	2	61.79	3	108.33	3	167.32
May 19-21, 2026	(New Zealand) 2026 Oceania International	1	51.60	1	87.88	1	139.48
