= Elina Kettunen =

Finnish figure skater

Personal information
- Born: 10 April 1981 (age 45) Helsinki, Finland
- Height: 1.63 m (5 ft 4 in)

Figure skating career
- Country: Finland
- Coach: Tarja Sipilä; Jari Malinen
- Skating club: Helsingin Luistelijat

Elina Kettunen (born 10 April 1981) is a Finnish former competitive figure skater. She is the 1999 Nebelhorn Trophy bronze medalist, the 2004 Finlandia Trophy bronze medalist, a three-time Nordic champion, and the 2001 Finnish national champion. She finished in the top fourteen at seven ISU Championships. Her best result, fifth, came at the 2000 Junior Worlds in Oberstdorf and 2002 Europeans in Lausanne.

Kettunen was selected to represent Finland at the 2002 Winter Olympics in Salt Lake City. She qualified for the final segment by placing 18th in the short program and went on to finish 11th overall (9th in the free).

== Programs ==
Season	Short program	Free skating
2004–2005	Dream Concerto - The World of Piano by Michael Drobesch	ABBA medley performed by Richard Clayderman
2003–2004	Dream Concerto - The World of Piano by Michael Drobesch	Secret Garden by Rolf Løvland
2002–2003	The Duellists, the Final Duel by Howard Blake	Les Misérables by Anthony Inglis
2001–2002	The Duellists, the Final Duel by Howard Blake	Mr. Bean (soundtrack); The Cider House Rules by Howard Goodall
2000–2001	The Gods Must Be Crazy by Charles Fox	Reflections of Passion; My World in Music by Yanni

== Results ==
GP: Grand Prix; JGP: Junior Grand Prix

International
Event	97–98	98–99	99–00	00–01	01–02	02–03	03–04	04–05
Olympics					11th			
Worlds				11th				
Europeans				7th	5th	10th		11th
GP Cup of China								5th
GP Cup of Russia						4th	11th	12th
GP Lalique				7th				
GP Skate America						12th		
Bofrost Cup on Ice							5th	
Finlandia Trophy		8th	6th	5th		4th	6th	3rd
Golden Spin				6th				
Nebelhorn Trophy			3rd	12th				9th
Nepela Memorial							6th	
Nordics		1st				1st	1st	2nd
International: Junior
Junior Worlds		14th	5th					
JGP Japan			9th					
JGP Slovenia			4th					
National
Finnish Champ.	6th	3rd	3rd	1st	2nd	2nd	2nd	3rd
WD: Withdrew
