= Kristoffer Berntsson =

Swedish figure skater (born 1982)

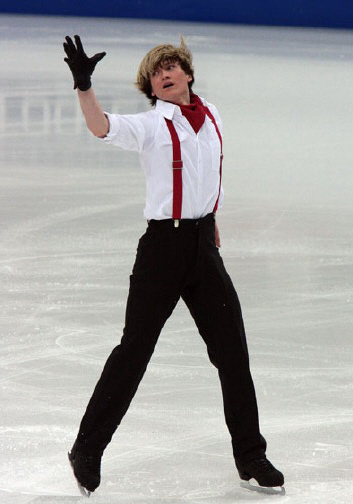
- Berntsson in 2009

Personal information
- Full name: Johan Kristoffer Berntsson
- Born: 13 July 1982 (age 44) Gothenburg, Sweden
- Height: 1.75 m (5 ft 9 in)

Figure skating career
- Country: Sweden
- Coach: Andrea Dohany
- Skating club: Landvetter KK
- Retired: March 2011

Johan Kristoffer Berntsson (born 13 July 1982) is a Swedish former competitive figure skater. He is an eight-time (2000–2001, 2004–2005, 2007–2010) Swedish national champion and the six-time (2002–2005, 2007 2010) Nordic Champion. Berntsson was the first Swede to land a triple Axel.

== Career ==
Berntsson began skating at age 5. Though he started out doing both hockey and figure skating, he soon focused exclusively on the latter. Berntsson won the Swedish junior national champion in 1996–1997, a title he would go on to win the next two season as well. He skated on the international junior circuit starting in 1998–1999. In the 1999–2000 season, still skating primarily as a junior, Berntsson won the national title and made his senior debut at the European Championships, finishing 21st. He finished in the same place for the next two seasons, and failed to qualify for the free skate at the 2001, 2002 and 2003 Worlds.

Berntsson had better results in 2003–2004, winning a medal at the Finlandia Trophy and moving up to 13th at the Europeans and 21st at Worlds. His results continued to improve the next season, when he moved into the top ten at Europeans for the first time in his career and was 14th at Worlds. In the 2005–2006 season, Berntsson finished 11th at both his Grand Prix events, and lost the national title to Adrian Schultheiss. He was 14th at the 2006 Europeans and 23rd at both the 2006 Winter Olympic Games and at Worlds.

The 2006–2007 season was Berntsson's best yet. Following a bronze medal at the 2006 Nebelhorn Trophy, he finished 6th at the Cup of Russia and 9th at the NHK Trophy, then regained his national title. At the 2007 Europeans, Berntsson finished 10th, and he was a career-best 9th at 2007 Worlds, where he received a standing ovation following his disco-themed long program. His placement qualified two slots for Sweden for the next World Championships, which were to be held in Gothenburg.

Berntsson tore muscles in his leg at the end of July 2007, and struggled in his fall events. He then finished 7th at the 2008 Europeans and 14th at Worlds.

Berntsson had hip surgery in April 2008. He finished 8th at the 2009 Europeans but 20th at Worlds, which, combined with Adrian Schultheiss's 18th place, meant that Sweden would have only one men's entry at the Olympics. Although Berntsson won Swedish Nationals, he was bypassed in favor of Schultheiss after finishing 15th at Europeans.

Berntsson won the silver medal at the 2010 Finlandia Trophy.

In March 2011, Berntsson said he would no longer compete at major events but would remain involved in skating.

== Personal life ==
Berntsson has an undergraduate degree in electrical engineering and is currently (2010) working toward a Master's degree in this field at Chalmers University of Technology.

He plays the guitar and used to play in a band when he was younger.

== Programs ==
| Season | Short program | Free skating |
|---|---|---|
| 2010–2011 | Comptine d'un autre été : L'après-midi (from Amélie) by Yann Tiersen | Michael Jackson medley: Smooth Criminal; Dirty Diana; Beat It; Come Together |
| 2009–2010 | Anvil of Grom (from Conan the Barbarian by Basil Poledouris | Sweet Dreams (Are Made of This) by Eurythmics performed by The String Quartet; Nocturne by Secret Garden; Supertonic Sweet Dreams by Magnus Hyden |
| 2008–2009 | La Valse D'Amelie by Yann Tiersen; Belleville Rendez-Vous by Ben Charest | Axel F by Harold Faltermeyer; Moments in Love by Art of Noise; Take On Me by A-HA |
| 2007–2008 | La Valse D'Amelie by Yann Tiersen; Belleville Rendez-Vous by Ben Charest | Boogie Wonderland (from "Madagascar"); Studio 54 by Dan Hartman; Disco Inferno (Saturday Night Fever) by The Trammps |
| 2006–2007 | Merecunde by Titanes de la Salsa; La Vida es un Carneval by Celia Cruz | Saturday Night Fever by Bee Gees; Studio 54 by Dan Hartman; Boogie Wonderland by Earth, Wind and Fire |
| 2005–2006 | Merecunde by Titanes de la Salsa; La Vida es un Carneval by Celia Cruz | Bombay Dreams; Between Heaven and Earth by A.R. Rahman |
| 2004–2005 | She Wants to Move by N.E.R.D.; Breathe by Prudigy | Prince Igor by Alexandr Borodin |
| 2003–2004 | Like I Love You (instrumental) by Justin Timberlake; Session by Linkin Park; Mona Lisa Overdrive by Juno Reactor, Don Davis | The Time Machine by Klaus Badelt |
| 2001–2003 | Fight Club performed by the Dust Brothers | Fear is the Key by R. Budd and his Orchestra; Paper Tiger by R. Budd The National Philharmonic Orchestra |
| 2000–2001 | Smoke on the Water The Moscow Symphony Orchestra | But we Never Talk Love at Large by Mark Isham, Wamen Zevon; Legends Indigo Spirit by The Brave; Yeah "Color of Love" by Ronne Earl and Broadsters |

== Competitive highlights ==
GP: Grand Prix; JGP: Junior Grand Prix

International
| Event | 96–97 | 97–98 | 98–99 | 99–00 | 00–01 | 01–02 | 02–03 | 03–04 | 04–05 | 05–06 | 06–07 | 07–08 | 08–09 | 09–10 | 10–11 |
|---|---|---|---|---|---|---|---|---|---|---|---|---|---|---|---|
| Olympics | | | | | | | | | | 23rd | | | | | |
| Worlds | | | | | 31st | 29th | 31st | 21st | 14th | 23rd | 9th | 14th | 20th | | |
| Europeans | | | | 21st | 21st | 21st | 15th | 13th | 10th | 14th | 10th | 7th | 8th | 15th | 14th |
| GP Cup of China | | | | | | | | | | | | | 8th | | |
| GP Cup of Russia | | | | | | | | | | 11th | 6th | 10th | 8th | | |
| GP NHK Trophy | | | | | | | | | | | 9th | | | 12th | |
| GP Skate America | | | | | | | | | | 11th | | 11th | | | |
| GP Skate Canada | | | | | | | | | | | | | | | 11th |
| Bofrost Cup | | | | | | | | 4th | | | | | | | |
| Crystal Skate | | | | | | | | | | | | | | 1st | |
| Finlandia Trophy | | | | | | | 10th | 3rd | | | | | | 6th | 2nd |
| Golden Spin | | | | | | | 7th | 12th | | 9th | | | | | |
| Schäfer Memorial | | | | | | | | 4th | | | 3rd | | | | |
| Merano Cup | | | | | | | | | | | | | | | 3rd |
| Nebelhorn Trophy | | | | | | | 9th | 14th | | 16th | | | | | |
| Nordics | | | | | | 1st | 1st | 1st | 1st | | 1st | | | 1st | 3rd |
| Universiade | | | | | | | | | | | | | 11th | | |
International: Junior
| Junior Worlds | | | | 22nd | | | | | | | | | | | |
| JGP Bulgaria | | | 15th | | | | | | | | | | | | |
| JGP China | | | | | 12th | | | | | | | | | | |
| JGP Germany | | | 14th | | | | | | | | | | | | |
| JGP Netherlands | | | | 9th | | 12th | | | | | | | | | |
| JGP Norway | | | | | 7th | | | | | | | | | | |
| JGP Sweden | | | | 6th | | | | | | | | | | | |
| EYOF | | | 3rd | | | | | | | | | | | | |
| Nordics | | 1st J | 2nd J | | | | | | | | | | | | |
National
| Swedish Champ. | 1st J | 1st J | 1st J | 1st | 1st | | | 1st | 1st | 2nd | 1st | 1st | 1st | 1st | 1st |
J = Junior level; WD = Withdrew
