= Samuli Tyyskä =

Finnish figure skater

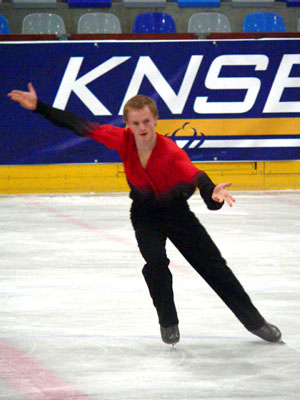
- Tyyskä in 2006.

Personal information
- Full name: Samuli Tyyskä
- Born: 23 March 1990 (age 36) Helsinki
- Height: 1.73 m (5 ft 8 in)

Figure skating career
- Country: Finland
- Coach: Svetlana Kriukova
- Skating club: Helsingin Luistelljat

Samuli Tyyskä (born 23 March 1990) is a Finnish figure skater. He is the two time Finnish junior national champion. He is the 2007 Nordic junior silver medalist and has competed on the Junior Grand Prix circuit.

== Competitive highlights ==
Event	2004–05	2005–06	2006–07	2007–08	2008–09	2009–10	2010–11	2011–12
World Junior Championships			25th					
Finnish Championships	2nd J.	1st J.	1st J.	2nd J.	5th J.	4th	WD	7th
Nordic Championships	6th J.	4th J.	2nd J.		4th J.	7th		
NRW Trophy						17th		
Bavarian Open								10th
Winter Universiade							25th	
Junior Grand Prix, Germany				18th				
Junior Grand Prix, Estonia				16th				
Junior Grand Prix, Czech Republic			19th					
Junior Grand Prix, Netherlands			19th					
J. = Junior level
