= Isabelle Olsson (figure skater) =

Swedish figure skater

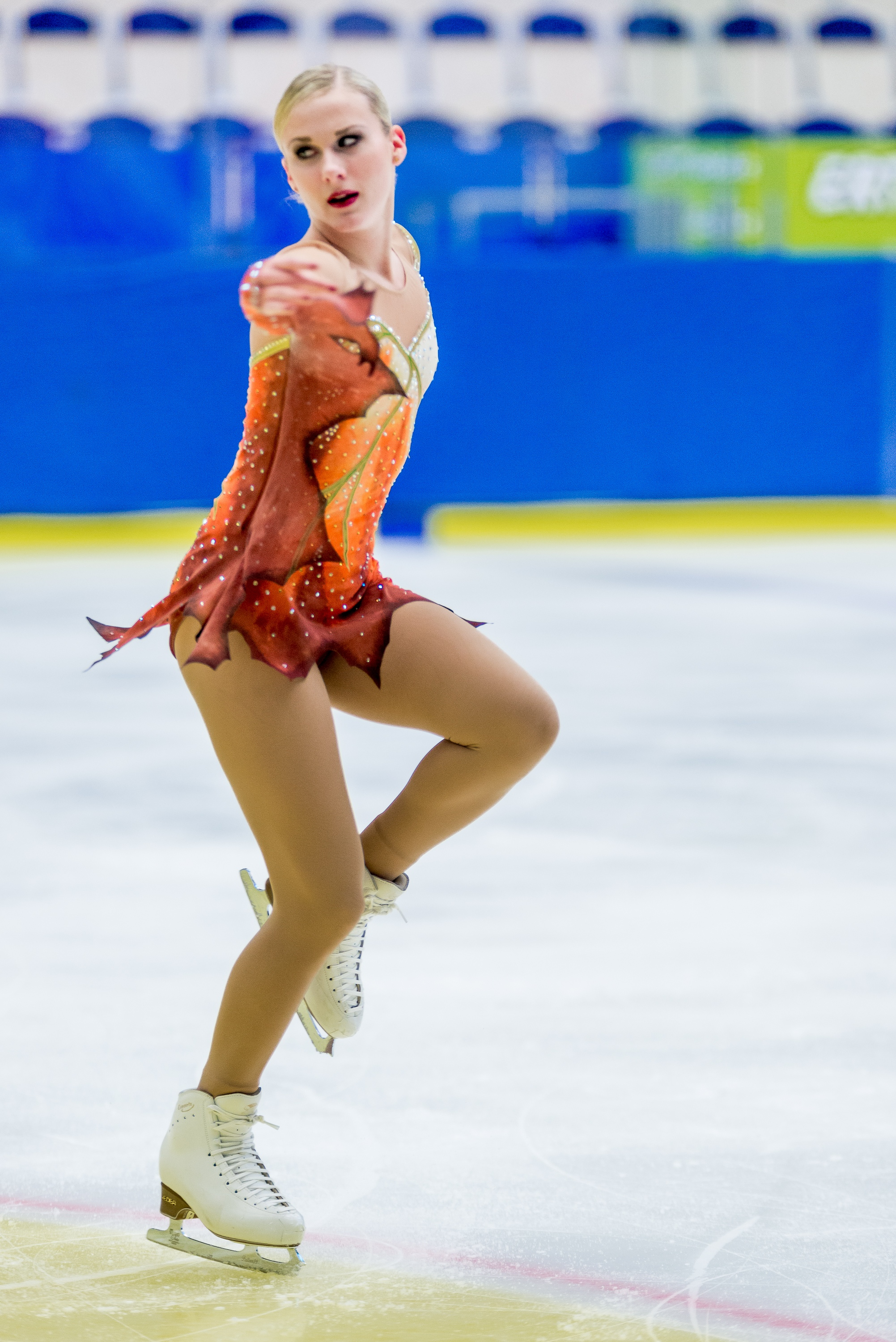
- Olsson in December 2013

Personal information
- Born: 15 April 1993 (age 33) Karlskrona, Sweden
- Height: 1.59 m (5 ft 2 1/2 in)

Figure skating career
- Country: Sweden
- Coach: Susanne Olsson
- Skating club: Mörrums SC
- Began skating: 1996
- Retired: January 12, 2018

Isabelle Olsson (born 15 April 1993) is a Swedish former figure skater. She is a two-time medalist on the ISU Challenger Series – having won silver at the 2014 Ice Challenge and gold at the 2015 Denkova-Staviski Cup – and a four-time Swedish national medalist. She has won twelve other senior international medals and reached the free skate at three ISU Championships.

== Personal life ==
Isabelle Olsson was born on 15 April 1993 in Karlskrona, Sweden. The daughter of Susanne and Ulf Olsson, she has a twin brother, Johannes, and a sister, Angelica, who is older by one and a half years. Her sister is a former competitive figure skater and their mother coaches figure skating.

== Career ==
=== 2008 to 2012 ===
Olsson debuted on the ISU Junior Grand Prix (JGP) series in 2008. In the 2009–10 season, she won a bronze medal at JGP Lake Placid and the Swedish national junior title. She was selected to represent Sweden at the 2011 World Junior Championships in Gangneung, South Korea. Her placement of 13th in the short program allowed her to advance to the free skate where she ranked 24th, dropping her to 24th overall.

Olsson ended her junior career after competing at a pair of JGP events in October 2011. The following month, she made her senior international debut, placing fifth at the Crystal Skate of Romania. In February 2012, she won bronze medals at the Bavarian Open and The Nordics.

=== 2012–13 season ===
In the 2012–13 season, Olsson won silver medals at the International Cup of Nice and Ice Challenge, followed by gold at the Warsaw Cup and bronze at the Swedish Championships. The following season, she repeated as the national bronze medalist and was sent to the 2014 European Championships, where Sweden was allowed three ladies' entries. Ranked 22nd in the short program and 15th in the free skate, she finished 16th overall at Europeans, which took place in January in Budapest, Hungary. In March 2014, she won gold at the International Challenge Cup in The Hague, Netherlands.

=== 2014–15 season ===
Olsson competed at three 2014–15 ISU Challenger Series events, winning silver at the 2014 Ice Challenge. She was awarded the bronze medal at the Swedish Championships.

=== 2015–16 season ===
In the 2015–16 season, Olsson scored personal bests in the free skate and combined score to win the gold medal at a Challenger Series event, the 2015 Denkova-Staviski Cup, with a margin of 1.01 over silver medalist Angelīna Kučvaļska. She was invited to compete at her first-ever Grand Prix event, 2015 Skate Canada International, as a replacement for Elene Gedevanishvili, who withdrew from the event; Olsson placed 11th in both segments and 12th overall. After winning the silver medal at the Swedish Championships, she was named in the Swedish team to the 2016 European Championships in Bratislava, Slovakia. There she qualified for the final after placing 23rd in the short program. She placed 24th in the free program and overall.

== Programs ==
Season	Short program	Free skating
2016–17	I Put a Spell on You by Screamin' Jay Hawkins	Diamonds Are Forever by John Barry
2015–16	I Was Here by Beyoncé choreo. by Kim Zandvoort	Summer (from The Four Seasons) by Antonio Vivaldi choreo. by Kim Zandvoort
2014–15	I Was Here by Beyoncé choreo. by Kim Zandvoort	Let's Do It by Cole Porter performed by Peggy Lee choreo. by Kim Zandvoort
2013–14	Moviola by John Barry	Medley by Nightwish
2012–13	Boogie Woogie Bugle Boy	Medley by Nightwish
2011–12	Boogie Woogie Bugle Boy	Sacred Spirit II - Culture Crash
2010–11	Kill Bill	Sacred Spirit II - Culture Crash
2009–10	Kill Bill	Atlantis by Éric Serra
2008–09	The Mambo Kings	Atlantis by Éric Serra

== Results ==
GP: Grand Prix; CS: Challenger Series; JGP: Junior Grand Prix

International
Event	08–09	09–10	10–11	11–12	12–13	13–14	14–15	15–16	16–17
Europeans						16th		24th	
GP Skate Canada								12th	
CS Denkova-Staviski								1st	
CS Golden Spin							6th		
CS Ice Challenge							2nd		
CS Warsaw Cup							5th		
Bavarian Open				3rd	4th				
Int. Challenge Cup						1st			9th
Crystal Skate				5th					
Cup of Nice					2nd	8th	3rd		
Cup of Tyrol								3rd	
Dragon Trophy									1st
Finlandia					5th	6th			
Ice Challenge					2nd		2nd		
Nordics				3rd	4th	4th	WD	3rd	7th
Coupe du Printemps				5th	4th				
Triglav Trophy						3rd			
Warsaw Cup					1st	5th			
International: Junior
Junior Worlds			24th						
JGP Belarus	8th								
JGP Czech Republic	25th								
JGP Estonia				8th					
JGP Germany		9th							
JGP Italy				9th					
JGP Romania			5th						
JGP U.K.			6th						
JGP U.S.		3rd							
Int. Challenge Cup	3rd J								
Cup of Nice		5th J							
Ice Challenge			2nd J						
Nordics	2nd J		1st J						
Skate Celje			4th J						
National
Swedish Champ.	2nd J	1st J	2nd J	4th	3rd	3rd	3rd	2nd	
J = Junior level; WD = Withdrew
