= Isabelle Olsson (designer) =

Swedish industrial designer and vice president of Google

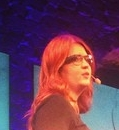
- Occupation: Industrial designer

Isabelle Maj Olsson (born August 20, 1983) is a Swedish Industrial Designer and Vice President for Google. Olsson originally joined the X Lab at Google in 2011 and became the lead designer of the Google Glass product.

Olsson started working for Google in 2011. Previously she worked for Fuse Project. She quickly became the designer of Google Glass. In 2013, Olsson custom-designed a tortoise-shell framed Google Glass.

Olsson has been interviewed and profiled in a number of publications.

Metropolis magazine invited Olsson to publish her account of her research into making a sustainable substitute for leather out of Pineapple leaves. The magazine called Olsson one of "the textile industry's foremost experts."
