= Thomas Öberg (figure skater) =

Swedish figure skater

Personal information
- Full name: Lars Thomas Öberg
- Born: 10 August 1958 (age 67) Gällivare, Sweden
- Height: 1.80 m (5 ft 11 in)

Figure skating career
- Country: Sweden
- Skating club: Göteborgs Konståkningsklubb
- Retired: c. 1981

Lars Thomas Öberg (born 10 August 1958) is a Swedish former competitive figure skater. He is a four-time Nordic champion (1973, 1976, 1978–79) and a nine-time Swedish national champion (1972–80). He represented his country at the 1980 Winter Olympics and placed 14th. A competitor at multiple World and European Championships, he finished in the top ten at the 1980 Europeans in Gothenburg.

== Results ==
International
Event	70–71	71–72	72–73	73–74	74–75	75–76	76–77	77–78	78–79	79–80	80–81
Olympics										14th	
Worlds				23rd		20th			17th	19th	14th
Europeans		21st		18th	18th		14th	13th	18th	10th	12th
NHK Trophy											5th
Nordics		3rd	1st	2nd	2nd	1st		1st	1st		
Prague Skate					10th						
National
Swedish	2nd	1st	1st	1st	1st	1st	1st	1st	1st	1st	
