= Kalle Tuulos =

Finnish figure skater

Personal information
- Full name: Kalle Kustaa Tuulos
- Born: 15 May 1930 Tampere, Finland
- Died: 4 March 2001 (aged 70) Tampere, Finland

Figure skating career
- Country: Finland
- Skating club: Tampereen Luistelijat
- Retired: 1956

Kalle Kustaa Tuulos (15 May 1930 — 4 March 2001) was a Finnish figure skater. Competing in single skating, he was an eight-time Finnish national champion (1949–56) representing Tampereen Luistelijat of Tampere. Sent to two Winter Olympics, Tuulos placed 13th in 1952 (Oslo) and 15th in 1956 (Cortina d'Ampezzo). He was the nephew of Vilho Tuulos.

== Competitive highlights ==
International
Event	1947	1948	1949	1950	1951	1952	1953	1954	1955	1956
Olympics						13th				15th
World Champ.				6th						
Nordics			2nd	2nd	2nd		1st	2nd	1st	1st
National
Finnish Champ.	2nd	2nd	1st	1st	1st	1st	1st	1st	1st	1st
