= Jan Ullmark =

Jan Ullmark is a figure skating coach who lives in Alberta, Canada. He is a former Swedish national figure skating champion who now coaches at the Canmore Club in Canmore, Alberta, and The Royal Glenora Club in Edmonton, Alberta. He coached 2002 Olympic Champions Jamie Salé and David Pelletier to their gold medal in the 2002 Olympic Winter Games figure skating scandal. They began training with Ullmark in the summer of 2001 after leaving former skating coach Richard Gauthier. Ullmark has also coached Anabelle Langlois and Patrice Archetto, Ben Ferreira, and Michael Slipchuk.
