= Jussiville Partanen =

Finnish ice dancer

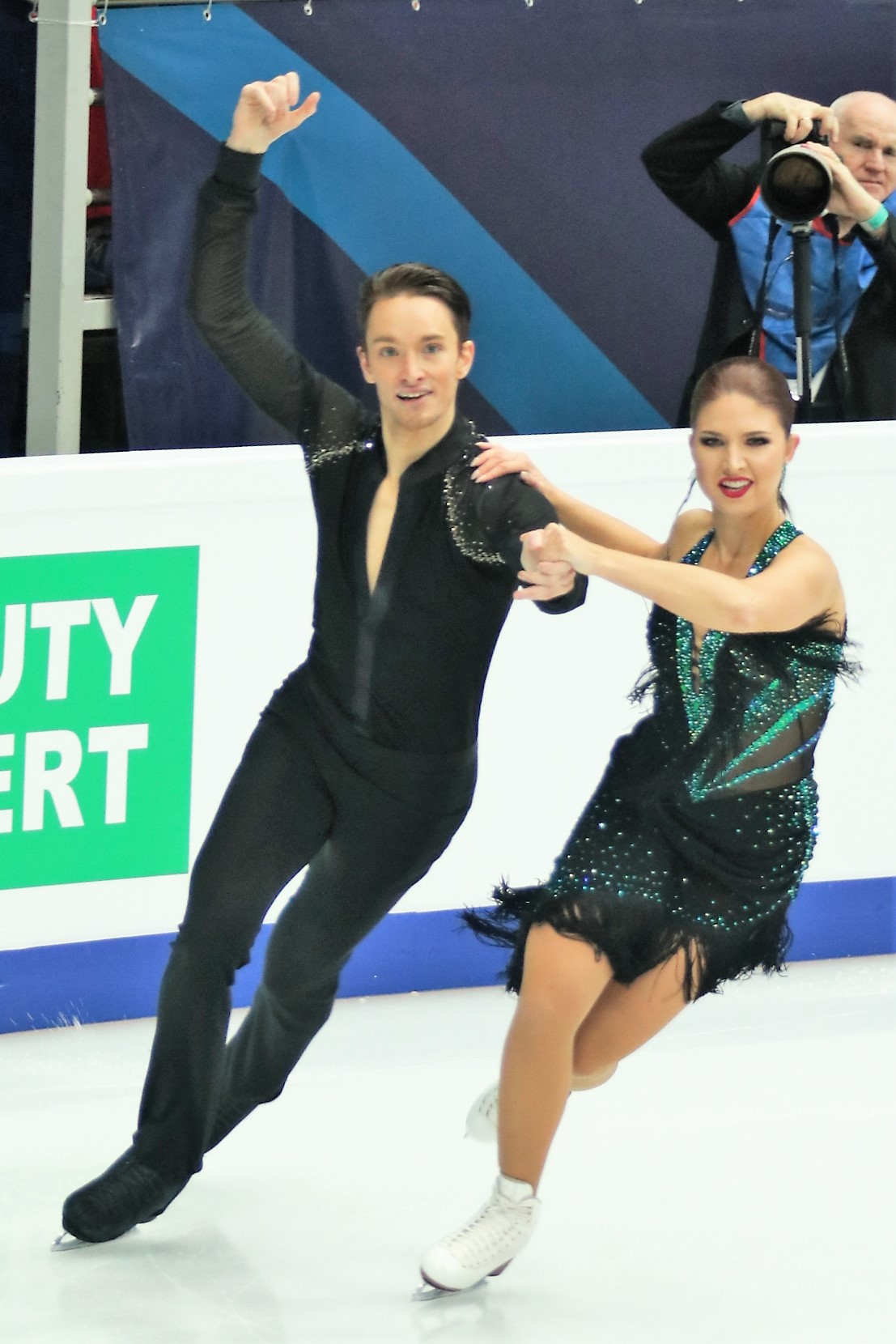
- Törn/Partanen at the 2018 European Championships

Personal information
- Born: 15 July 1991 (age 35) Kuopio, Finland
- Height: 1.82 m (5 ft 11 1/2 in)

Figure skating career
- Country: Finland
- Partner: Arina Klinovitskaya
- Coach: Maurizio Margaglio
- Skating club: Helsingin Luistelijat
- Began skating: 2001

Jussiville Partanen (born 15 July 1991) is a Finnish ice dancer. With his former skating partner, Cecilia Törn, he is the 2015 International Cup of Nice champion, the 2017 Ice Challenge champion, and a three-time Finnish national champion (2016–2018). They won bronze at three ISU Challenger Series events and competed in the final segment at four ISU Championships.

== Career ==
=== Early career ===
Partanen began learning to skate in 2001. He skated with Laima Krasnitskaja in the 2010–2011 season, winning the junior silver medal at the Finnish Championships.

In the 2011–2012 season, Partanen began competing with Canada's Sara Aghai for Finland. They placed in the top ten at both of their ISU Junior Grand Prix assignments and went on to win the Finnish national junior title. At the 2012 World Junior Championships in Minsk, they qualified for the final segment by placing 8th in the preliminary round and 12th in the short dance. They finished 16th overall after placing 17th in the free dance.

In the 2012–2013 season, Aghai/Partanen repeated as the Finnish junior champions. Ranked 24th in the short dance, they did not qualify for the final segment at the 2013 World Junior Championships in Milan. They parted ways at the end of the season.

Partanen teamed up with Cecilia Törn in 2013. In their first season together, the two won the silver medal at the Finnish Championships, behind Henna Lindholm / Ossi Kanervo.

=== 2014–2015 season ===
Törn/Partanen placed seventh at the 2014 CS Finlandia Trophy and second to Olesia Karmi / Max Lindholm at the Finnish Championships. They were sent to the 2015 World Championships in Shanghai but were eliminated after placing 25th in the short dance.

=== 2015–2016 season ===
Törn/Partanen began the 2015–2016 season by placing fourth at the Lombardia Trophy and fifth at a Challenger Series event, the Finlandia Trophy. Their first international medal, gold, came at the International Cup of Nice in October. In November, they were awarded bronze medals at the 2015 CS Tallinn Trophy and 2015 CS Warsaw Cup. The following month, the two became the Finnish national champions, ahead of Karmi/Lindholm.

Törn/Partanen went on to qualify to the final segment at both of their ISU Championship assignments. Ranked 18th in the short and 14th in the free, they finished 15th overall at the 2016 European Championships in Bratislava, Slovakia. At the 2016 World Championships in Boston, they placed 17th in the short, 19th in the free, and 18th overall.

=== 2016–2017 season ===
On 7 July 2016, Törn/Partanen were invited to the 2016 Skate Canada International, their first Grand Prix event, replacing Federica Testa / Lukáš Csölley who withdrew. They started their season by winning the bronze medal at 2016 CS Lombardia Trophy and placing 7th at 2016 CS Finlandia Trophy. In December, they won their second Finnish national title, in Tampere.

In January, Törn/Partanen placed 14th in the short dance, 18th in the free dance, and 17th overall at the 2017 European Championships in Ostrava, Czech Republic. Ranked 24th in the short, the two missed qualifying to the final segment at the 2017 World Championships, which took place in March in Helsinki, Finland.

=== 2017–2018 season ===
In September, Törn/Partanen competed at the 2017 CS Nebelhorn Trophy, the final qualification opportunity for the 2018 Winter Olympics. They ranked fifth in the short dance but dropped to ninth overall after the free dance, finishing as third alternates for a spot at the Olympics. They won gold at the 2017 Ice Challenge in November and their third national title the following month.

In January, they finished 15th at the 2018 European Championships in Moscow, Russia. In March, they placed 23rd in the short dance at the 2018 World Championships in Milan. As a result, they did not advance to the final segment for the second year in a row.

=== 2018–2019 season ===
Törn/Partanen were invited to the 2018 Grand Prix of Helsinki. They withdrew before the event. In November, they announced the end of their partnership.

=== 2019-2020 season ===
Jussiville Partanen teamed up with Russia's Arina Klinovitskaya on August 17, 2019.

== Programs ==
=== With Törn ===
Season	Short dance	Free dance	Exhibition
2017–2018	Samba: Sambando performed by Los Ritmos Calientes; Rhumba: Con Los Anos Que Me Quedan performed by Thalía; Samba: Are You Ready? performed by Alessandro Olivato	Funny Face Ouverture by George Gershwin; I've Got a Crush on You performed by Barbra Streisand, Frank Sinatra; Funny Face Ouverture by George Gershwin	
2016–2017	Blues: Fancy Man Blues; Jive: Dance Little Sister by The Rolling Stones	Gravity by Sara Bareilles; Life by Ludovico Einaudi; Stonemilker by Björk; The Golden Age by Woodkid	You Are So Beautiful covered by Joe Cocker; Holding Out for a Hero by Bonnie Tyler
2015–2016	The World (With You); Witchcraft by Frank Sinatra	Gravity by Sara Bareilles; Life by Ludovico Einaudi	
2014–2015	Fandango; Paso Doble	Another Brick in the Wall; Hey You; Money by Pink Floyd	
2013–2014	Pencil Full of Lead by Paolo Nutini; More	Exogenesis: Symphony Part 3; Exogenesis: Symphony Part 2 by Muse	

=== With Aghai ===
Season	Short dance	Free dance
2012–2013	Trouble by Elvis Presley	Egyptic by Beats Antique; Feres by Natacha Atlas; Sharm-el-Sheikh by Zamalek Musicians
2011–2012	Rumba Rumba by Roni Benise; Sex Bomb by Tom Jones	Burlesque: Welcome to Burlesque; Far From Over by Cher; Show Me How You Burlesque by Christina Aguilera

== Competitive highlights ==
GP: Grand Prix; CS: Challenger Series; JGP: Junior Grand Prix

=== With Klinovitskaya ===
International
Event	19–20
Egna Trophy	10th
Santa Claus Cup	9th
National
Finnish Champ.	2nd
WD = Withdrew

=== With Törn ===
International
Event	13–14	14–15	15–16	16–17	17–18	18–19
World Champ.		25th	18th	24th	23rd	
European Champ.			15th	17th	15th	
GP Finland						WD
GP Skate Canada				10th		
CS Finlandia	10th	7th	5th	7th	11th	
CS Lombardia			4th	3rd	5th	
CS Nebelhorn					9th	
CS Tallinn Trophy			3rd			
CS Warsaw Cup			3rd			
Bavarian Open	9th	8th		4th		
Cup of Nice	9th	4th	1st		8th	
Egna Trophy					1st	
Ice Challenge					1st	
Santa Claus Cup		5th				
Toruń Cup	6th					
Volvo Open Cup	10th					
National
Finnish Champ.	2nd	2nd	1st	1st	1st	
WD = Withdrew

=== With Aghai ===
International
Event	2011–12	2012–13
World Junior Champ.	16th	24th
JGP Australia	6th	
JGP Estonia	9th	
JGP Turkey		11th
JGP United States		9th
National
Finnish Championships	1st J	1st J
J = Junior level

=== With Krasnitskaja ===
National
Event	2010–11
Finnish Championships	2nd J
J = Junior level
