= Monica Lindfors =

Finnish figure skater

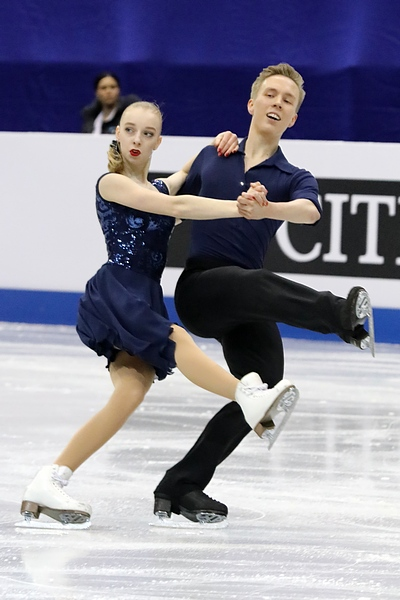

Personal information
- Born: November 22, 2000 (age 25) Helsinki
- Height: 1.65 m (5 ft 5 in)

Figure skating career
- Country: Finland
- Partner: Juho Pirinen (2016–2018)
- Skating club: Helsinki FSC
- Began skating: 2004

Monica Lindfors (born 22 November 2000) is a Finnish figure skater. With partner Juho Pirinen, she qualified to the final at the 2017 World Junior Championships.

== Personal life ==
Lindfors was born on November 22, 2000, in Helsinki, Finland. Her older sister Viveca, and younger siblings, Matias and Fanny, have also competed in single skating at the international level.

She is currently a student at the University of Oulu, where she studies architecture. In addition, Lindfors is bilingual, able to communicate in Finnish and English.

== Figure skating career ==
Lindfors began figure skating in 2004. From 2012 to 2016, she competed as a singles skater.

Prior to the 2016–17 figure skating season, she would decide to team up with Juho Pirinen to compete in the ice dance discipline. Coached by former Italian ice dancer, Maurizio Margaglio, in Helsinki, the duo won the 2016–17 Finnish Junior Championships, finished nineteenth at the 2017 World Junior Championships, and won bronze at the 2017–18 Finnish Junior Championships on the senior level. Their partnership would dissolve following the 2017–18 figure skating season.

== Post-competitive career ==
Following her competitive figure skating career, Lindfors began working as a figure skating choreographer at the Peurunka Ice Rink in Laukaa, Finland. Skaters she has worked with have included Valtter Virtanen, Kyrylo Marsak, and Makar Suntsev.

== Programs ==
(with Pirinen)

Season	Short dance	Free dance
2017–2018	Sway; Me As Matado el Corazon; Samba	Notre-Dame de Paris by Riccardo Cocciante
2016–2017	Tough Lover (from Burlesque) performed by Christina Aguilera choreo. by Ossi Kanervo	Amélie by Yann Tiersen choreo. by Ossi Kanervo

== Competitive highlights ==
CS: Challenger Series

International
Event	2016–17	2017–18
CS Tallinn Trophy		14th
Bavarian Open		7th
Egna Trophy		8th
International: Junior
Junior Worlds	19th	
Bavarian Open	14th J.	
Tallinn Trophy	12th J.	
NRW Trophy	18th J.	
National
Finnish Championships	1st J.	3rd
