= Finnish Figure Skating Championships =

Recurring figure skating competition

- Status: Active
- Genre: National championships
- Frequency: Annual
- Country: Finland
- Inaugurated: 1908
- Organizer: Skating Finland

The Finnish Figure Skating Championships (Finnish: Taitoluistelun SM-kilpailut) are an annual figure skating competition organized by Skating Finland (Suomen Taitoluisteluliitto; formerly known as the Finnish Figure Skating Association) to crown the national champions of Finland. The first Finnish Championships were held in 1908 in Helsinki and featured events only for men. Events for pair skating were added in 1911, for women in 1917, and for ice dance in 1981. Competitions were frequently interrupted early on, including in 1940 due to the Winter War. The championships were also cancelled in 2021 on account of the COVID-19 pandemic.

Medals are awarded in men's singles, women's singles, pair skating, and ice dance at the senior and junior levels, although each discipline may not necessarily be held every year due to a lack of participants. Marcus Nikkanen currently holds the record for winning the most Finnish Championship titles in men's singles (with ten), while Maj-Len Helin holds the record in women's singles (with eight). Lars Björkman holds the record in pair skating (with seven), although these were not all won with the same partner. Juulia Turkkila and Matthias Versluis are tied with Susanna Rahkamo and Petri Kokko for winning the most titles in ice dance (with six each); however, Kokko won two additional titles with a previous partner.

== Senior medalists ==
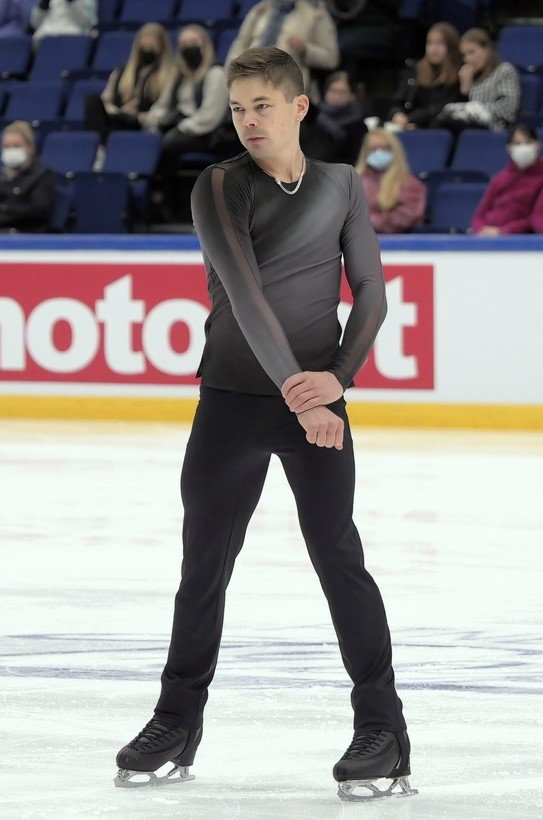
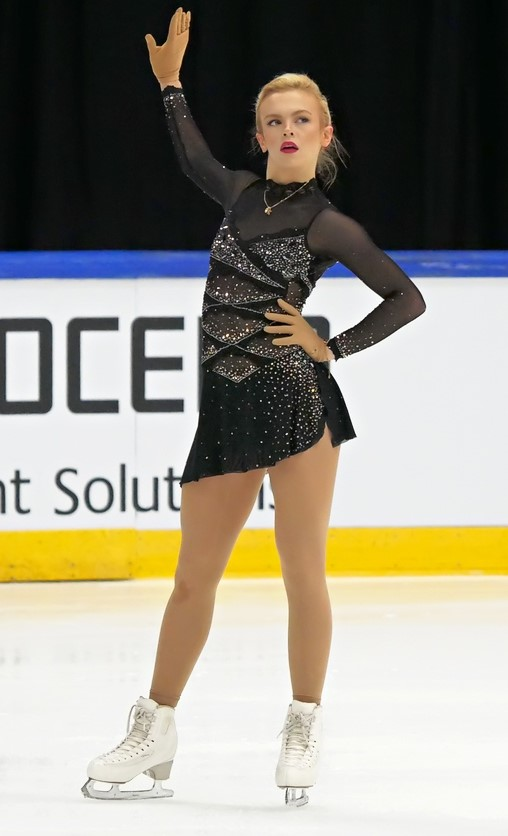
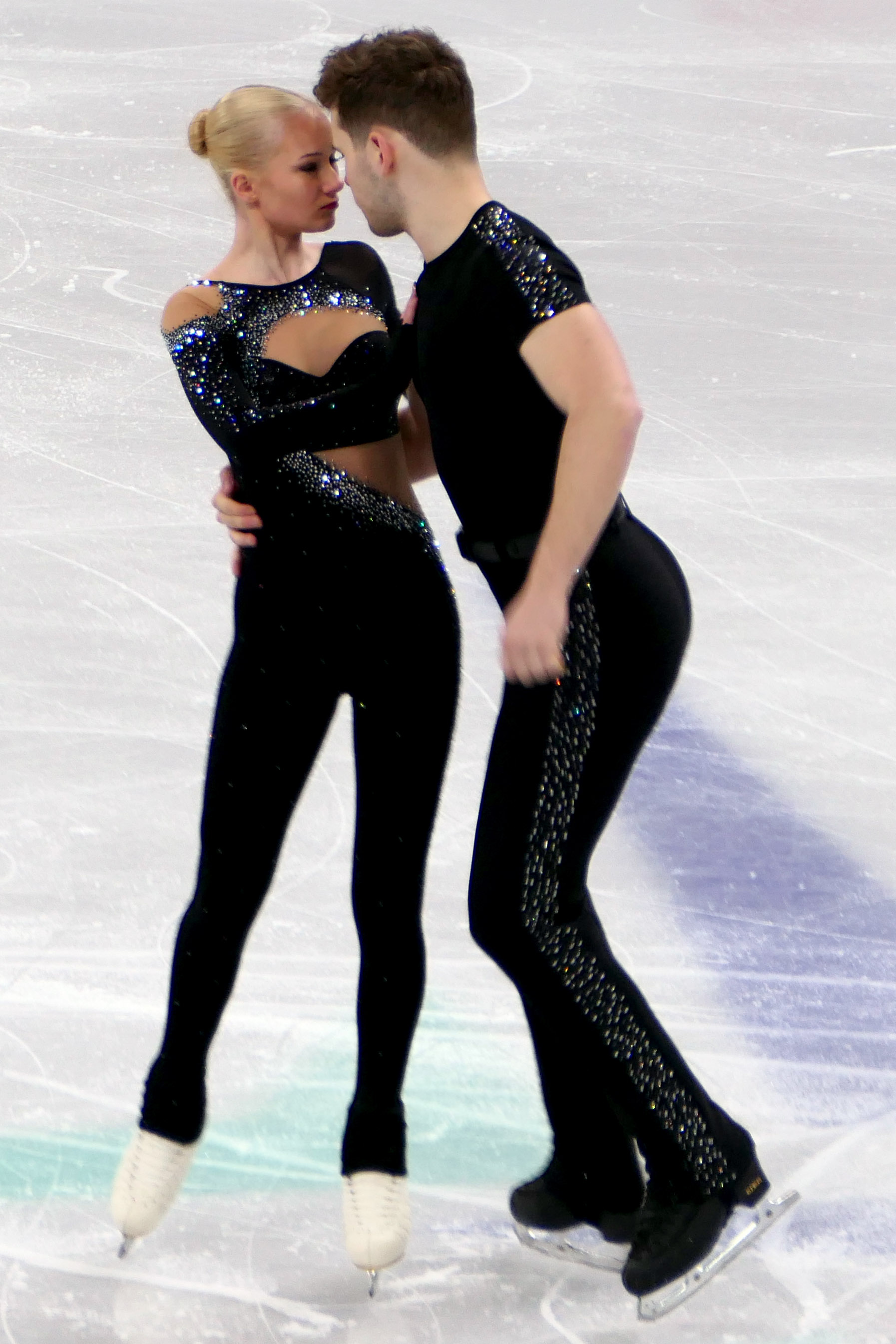
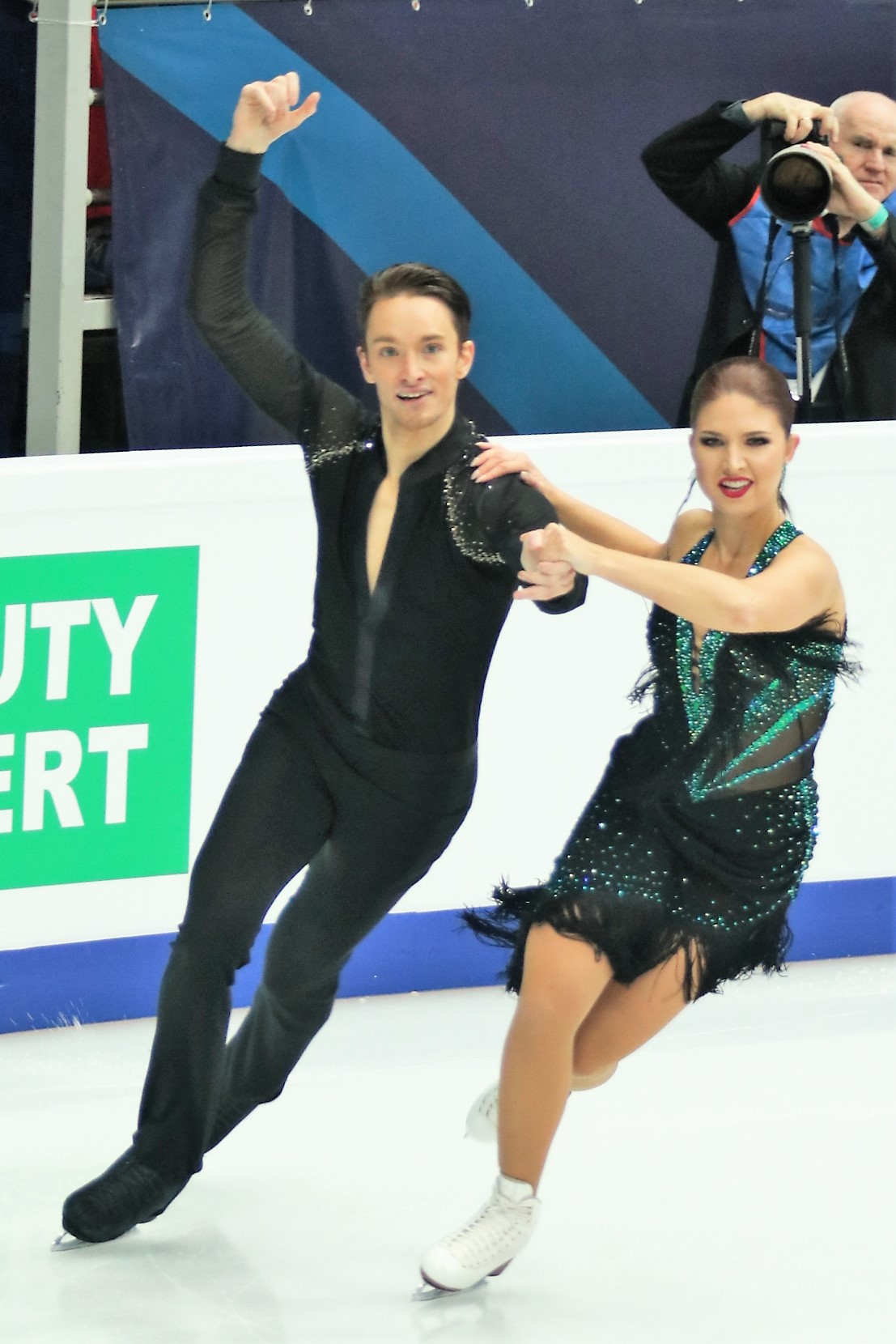
From left to right: Valtter Virtanen, eight-time Finnish champion in men's singles; Emmi Peltonen, three-time Finnish champion in women's singles; Milania Väänänen and Filippo Clerici, three-time Finnish champions in pair skating; and Cecilia Törn and Jussiville Partanen, three-time Finnish champions in ice dance

=== Men's singles ===
Senior men's event medalists
| Year | Location | Gold | Silver | Bronze | Ref. |
|---|---|---|---|---|---|
| 1908 | Helsinki | Sakari Ilmanen | Walter Jakobsson | No other competitors | |
| 1909 | Helsinki | Aleksander Huuri | H. Kesti | Sergei van der Vliet | |
| 1910 | Helsinki | Walter Jakobsson | Björnsson Schauman | Aleksander Huuri | |
| 1911 | Helsinki | Walter Jakobsson | Sakari Ilmanen | No other competitors | |
| 1912 | Helsinki | Sakari Ilmanen | Walter Jakobsson | No other competitors | |
| 1913 | Helsinki | Björnsson Schauman | Arne Hjelt | H. Kesti | |
| 1914 | Helsinki | Björnsson Schauman | Arne Hjelt | H. Kesti | |
| 1915 | Helsinki | Björnsson Schauman | Walter Jakobsson | No other competitors | |
| 1916 | Helsinki | Björnsson Schauman | Henri Bardy | No other competitors | |
| 1917 | Tampere | Björnsson Schauman | Henri Bardy | Walter Jakobsson | |
| 1918 | No competition held | | | | |
| 1919 | Helsinki | Björnsson Schauman | Gunnar Jakobsson | Henri Bardy | |
| 1920 | Turku | Sakari Ilmanen | Gunnar Jakobsson | No other competitors | |
| 1921 | Helsinki | Sakari Ilmanen | Björnsson Schauman | Gunnar Jakobsson | |
| 1922 | Helsinki | Sakari Ilmanen | Gunnar Jakobsson | Marcus Nikkanen | |
| 1923 | Helsinki | Gunnar Jakobsson | Marcus Nikkanen | Bertil Nikkanen | |
| 1924 | Helsinki | Sakari Ilmanen | Gunnar Jakobsson | Frans Kinnari | |
| 1925–26 | No competitions held | | | | |
| 1927 | Helsinki | Marcus Nikkanen | Gunnar Jakobsson | Frans Kinnari | |
| 1928 | Helsinki | Marcus Nikkanen | Gunnar Jakobsson | Bertil Nikkanen | |
| 1929 | Helsinki | Marcus Nikkanen | Bertil Nikkanen | Frans Kinnari | |
| 1930 | Tampere | Marcus Nikkanen | Frans Kinnari | Bertil Nikkanen | |
| 1931 | Helsinki | Bertel Nikkanen | Martin Gyldén | No other competitors | |
| 1932 | Helsinki | Gunnar Jakobsson | Bertel Nikkanen | Martin Gyldén | |
| 1933 | Helsinki | Bertel Nikkanen | Martin Gyldén | No other competitors | |
| 1934 | Helsinki | Marcus Nikkanen | Bertel Nikkanen | Martin Gyldén | |
| 1935 | Helsinki | Marcus Nikkanen | Martin Gyldén | No other competitors | |
| 1936 | Helsinki | Martin Gyldén | Marcus Nikkanen | No other competitors | |
| 1937 | Helsinki | Bertel Nikkanen | No other competitors | | |
| 1938 | Helsinki | Marcus Nikkanen | Martin Gyldén | Bertel Nikkanen | |
| 1939 | Helsinki | Marcus Nikkanen | Bertel Nikkanen | No other competitors | |
| 1940 | No competition due to the Winter War | | | | |
| 1941 | Helsinki | Birger Nyman | Lars Björkman | Aarne Ellilä | |
| 1942–44 | Helsinki | No men's competitions due to World War II | | | |
| 1945 | Helsinki | Marcus Nikkanen | Lars Björkman | Birger Nyman | |
| 1946 | Helsinki | Marcus Nikkanen | Lars Björkman | Bertel Nikkanen | |
| 1947 | Helsinki | Lars Björkman | Kalle Tuulos | Birger Nyman | |
| 1948 | Helsinki | Lars Björkman | Kalle Tuulos | Erkki Loimuneva | |
| 1949 | Helsinki | Kalle Tuulos | No other competitors | | |
| 1950 | Turku | Kalle Tuulos | Lars Björkman | No other competitors | |
| 1951 | Oulu | Kalle Tuulos | Lars Björkman | Mikko Virtanen | |
| 1952 | Pori | Kalle Tuulos | No other competitors | | |
| 1953 | Helsinki | Kalle Tuulos | Lars Björkman | No other competitors | |
| 1954 | Turku | Kalle Tuulos | Lars Björkman | No other competitors | |
| 1955 | Hämeenlinna | Kalle Tuulos | No other competitors | | |
| 1956 | Helsinki | Kalle Tuulos | Ragnar Wikström | No other competitors | |
| 1957 | Helsinki | Ragnar Wikström | Osmo Sikio | No other competitors | |
| 1958 | Turku | Ragnar Wikström | Jarmo Heinonen | Nils Kankkonen | |
| 1959 | No competition held | | | | |
| 1960 | Kuopio | Ragnar Wikström | Nils Kankkonen | Raimo Poutiainen | |
| 1961 | Rovaniemi | Ragnar Wikström | Ilkka Varhee | Raimo Poutiainen | |
| 1962 | Mikkeli | Ragnar Wikström | Ilkka Varhee | Raimo Poutiainen | |
| 1963 | Seinäjoki | Ragnar Wikström | Ilkka Varhee | Raimo Poutiainen | |
| 1964 | Lauttasaari | Ragnar Wikström | Ilkka Varhee | Raimo Poutiainen | |
| 1965 | Lahti | Raimo Poutiainen | No other competitors | | |
| 1966 | Helsinki | Ilkka Varhee | Tapio Seppälä | No other competitors | |
| 1967 | Helsinki | Ragnar Wikström | Ilkka Varhee | Tapio Seppälä | |
| 1968 | Helsinki | Tapio Seppälä | Ilkka Varhee | Pekka Leskinen | |
| 1969 | Tampere | Ragnar Wikström | Pekka Leskinen | Ilkka Varhee | |
| 1970 | Helsinki | Pekka Leskinen | Ragnar Wikström | Ilkka Varhee | |
| 1971 | Helsinki | Pekka Leskinen | No other competitors | | |
| 1972–74 | No men's competitors | | | | |
| 1975 | Helsinki | Pekka Leskinen | No other competitors | | |
| 1976–77 | No men's competitors | | | | |
| 1978 | Helsinki | Antti Kontiola | No other competitors | | |
| 1979 | Tampere | Antti Kontiola | Panu Aalto | No other competitors | |
| 1980 | Helsinki | Antti Kontiola | No other competitors | | |
| 1981 | Helsinki | Antti Kontiola | No other competitors | | |
| 1982 | Helsinki | No men's competitors | | | |
| 1983 | Helsinki | Antti Kontiola | Jukka Immonen | No other competitors | |
| 1984 | Helsinki | Antti Kontiola | Oula Jääskeläinen | Harri Kousa | |
| 1985 | Helsinki | Oula Jääskeläinen | No other competitors | | |
| 1986 | Helsinki | Oula Jääskeläinen | No other competitors | | |
| 1987 | Tampere | Oula Jääskeläinen | Jari Kauppi | No other competitors | |
| 1988 | Turku | Jari Kauppi | Marko Kuukasjärvi | Janne Kivimäki | |
| 1989 | Helsinki | Jari Kauppi | Oula Jääskeläinen | Marko Kuukasjärvi | |
| 1990 | Tampere | Jari Kauppi | Marko Kuukasjärvi | No other competitors | |
| 1991 | Helsinki | Oula Jääskeläinen | Marko Kuukasjärvi | No other competitors | |
| 1992 | Helsinki | Markus Leminen | No other competitors | | |
| 1993 | Turku | Markus Leminen | No other competitors | | |
| 1994 | Vantaa | Oula Jääskeläinen | Markus Leminen | No other competitors | |
| 1995 | Helsinki | Markus Leminen | Jukka Kalliomäki | No other competitors | |
| 1996 | Espoo | Markus Leminen | Jukka Kalliomäki | Antti Koskinen | |
| 1997 | Helsinki | Jukka Kalliomäki | Pasi Honkanen | No other competitors | |
| 1998 | Helsinki | Markus Leminen | Eduard Pyöriäinen | Tero Hämäläinen | |
| 1999 | Joensuu | Markus Leminen | Tero Hämäläinen | Pasi Honkanen | |
| 2000 | Tampere | Markus Leminen | Joni Juvonen | Tero Hämäläinen | |
| 2001 | Mikkeli | Markus Leminen | Eduard Pyöriäinen | Tero Hämäläinen | |
| 2002 | Helsinki | Markus Leminen | Visa Tuominen | Joni Juvonen | |
| 2003 | Turku | Ari-Pekka Nurmenkari | Mikko Minkkinen | Antti Aalto | |
| 2004 | Vantaa | Ari-Pekka Nurmenkari | Antti Aalto | Mikko Minkkinen | |
| 2005 | Oulu | Ari-Pekka Nurmenkari | Tommi Piiroinen | Joni Juvonen | |
| 2006 | Tampere | Ari-Pekka Nurmenkari | Valtter Virtanen | Mikko Minkkinen | |
| 2007 | Mikkeli | Ari-Pekka Nurmenkari | Valtter Virtanen | Tommi Piiroinen | |
| 2008 | Rauma | Mikko Minkkinen | Ari-Pekka Nurmenkari | Valtter Virtanen | |
| 2009 | Helsinki | Ari-Pekka Nurmenkari | Valtter Virtanen | Lasse Sääkslahti | |
| 2010 | Jyväskylä | Ari-Pekka Nurmenkari | Mikko Minkkinen | Valtter Virtanen | |
| 2011 | Turku | Bela Papp | Valtter Virtanen | Ari-Pekka Nurmenkari | |
| 2012 | Tampere | Ari-Pekka Nurmenkari | Matthias Versluis | Bela Papp | |
| 2013 | Joensuu | Valtter Virtanen | Matthias Versluis | Viktor Zubik | |
| 2014 | Espoo | Matthias Versluis | Valtter Virtanen | Bela Papp | |
| 2015 | Vantaa | Valtter Virtanen | Tomi Pulkkinen | Viktor Zubik | |
| 2016 | Mikkeli | Valtter Virtanen | Roman Galay | Matthias Versluis | |
| 2017 | Tampere | Valtter Virtanen | No other competitors | | |
| 2018 | Kouvola | Valtter Virtanen | Bela Papp | Roman Galay | |
| 2019 | Kouvola | Roman Galay | Valtter Virtanen | No other competitors | |
| 2020 | Vantaa | Roman Galay | Valtter Virtanen | Lauri Lankila | |
| 2021 | Helsinki | Competition cancelled due to the COVID-19 pandemic | | | |
| 2022 | Pori | Valtter Virtanen | Makar Suntsev | Jan Ollikainen | |
| 2023 | Joensuu | Valtter Virtanen | Makar Suntsev | Matias Lindfors | |
| 2024 | Helsinki | Makar Suntsev | Valtter Virtanen | Arttu Juusola | |
| 2025 | Rauma | Valtter Virtanen | Arttu Juusola | Jan Ollikainen | |
| 2026 | Lahti | Matias Lindfors | Makar Suntsev | Valtter Virtanen | |

=== Women's singles ===
Senior women's event medalists
| Year | Location | Gold | Silver | Bronze | Ref. |
|---|---|---|---|---|---|
| 1917 | Viipuri | Ludowika Jakobsson | No other competitors | | |
| 1918 | No competition held | | | | |
| 1919 | Helsinki | Anna-Lisa Allardt | No other competitors | | |
| 1920 | Helsinki | No women's competitors | | | |
| 1921 | Helsinki | Svea Norén (Sweden) (Note: Ludowika Jakobsson was named the 1921 Finnish champion, because Svea Norén, the first-place finisher, was a guest skater from Sweden.) | Ludowika Jakobsson | No other competitors | |
| 1922 | Helsinki | Gunnel Relander (née Nystén) | Mary Lindeberg | Vali Sevón | |
| 1923 | Helsinki | Anna-Greta Henriksson | Gunnel Relander (née Nystén) | Vali Sevón | |
| 1924 | Helsinki | Anna-Greta Henriksson | Mary Lindeberg | Salli Särkipato | |
| 1925–26 | No competitions held | | | | |
| 1927 | Helsinki | Anna-Greta Henriksson | Rauha Perkiö | Ilma Suuronen | |
| 1928 | Helsinki | Gunnel Relander (née Nystén) | Anna-Greta Henriksson | Ilma Suuronen | |
| 1929 | Helsinki | Gunnel Relander (née Nystén) | Rauha Perkiö | Ilma Suuronen | |
| 1930 | Tampere | Gunnel Relander (née Nystén) | Ilma Suuronen | Rauha Perkiö | |
| 1931 | Helsinki | Ilma Suuronen | Gunnel Relander (née Nystén) | Rauha Perkiö | |
| 1932 | Helsinki | Gunnel Relander (née Nystén) | Ilma Suuronen | Mary Lindeberg | |
| 1933 | Helsinki | Ilma Suuronen | Mary Lindeberg | Aune Lähteenmäki | |
| 1934 | Helsinki | Mary Lindeberg | Ilma Suuronen | Aune Lähteenmäki | |
| 1935 | Helsinki | Mary Lindeberg | Mildred Engström | Aune Lähteenmäki | |
| 1936 | Helsinki | Ilma Suuronen | Maj-Len Helin | No other competitors | |
| 1937 | Helsinki | Maj-Len Helin | Ilma Suuronen | Mary Lindeberg | |
| 1938 | Helsinki | Maj-Len Helin | Ilma Suuronen | Sisko Terho | |
| 1939 | Tampere | Maj-Len Helin | Ilma Suuronen | Sirkka Mikkolainen | |
| 1940 | No competition due to the Winter War | | | | |
| 1941 | Helsinki | Maj-Len Helin | Ilma Suuronen | Sirkka Mikkolainen | |
| 1942 | Helsinki | Maj-Len Helin | Leena Pietilä | Sirkka Mikkolainen | |
| 1943 | Helsinki | Maj-Len Helin | Sirkka Mikkolainen | Leena Pietilä | |
| 1944 | Helsinki | Maj-Len Helin | Leena Pietilä | Riitta Linna | |
| 1945 | Helsinki | Maj-Len Helin | Liisa Helanterä | Sirkka Mikkolainen | |
| 1946 | Helsinki | Leena Pietilä | Harriet Pantaenius | Kirsti Sinkkonen | |
| 1947 | Helsinki | Leena Pietilä | Liisa Helanterä | Kirsti Linna | |
| 1948 | Helsinki | Kirsti Linna | Harriet Pantaenius | Riitta Linna | |
| 1949 | Hämeenlinna | Leena Pietilä | Kirsti Linna | Liisa Airisto | |
| 1950 | Turku | Leena Pietilä | Riitta Linna | Ulla Andersson | |
| 1951 | Helsinki | Leena Pietilä | Kirsti Linna | Riitta Linna | |
| 1952 | Pori | Leena Pietilä | Riitta Linna | Ulla Andersson | |
| 1953 | Helsinki | Leena Pietilä | Kirsti Linna | Sirkka Lehto | |
| 1954 | Turku | Kirsti Linna | Riitta Linna | Sirkka Lehto | |
| 1955 | Hämeenlinna | Riitta Linna | Kirsti Linna | Sirkka Lehto | |
| 1956 | Helsinki | Kirsti Linna | Elvi Halme | Anja Ollinen | |
| 1957 | Helsinki | Kirsti Linna | Elina Enestam | Eeva Angervo | |
| 1958 | Turku | Kirsti Linna | Elina Enestam | Taina Savolainen | |
| 1959 | No competition held | | | | |
| 1960 | Kuopio | Kaarina Kukkonen | Maire Nylund | Kirsti Linna | |
| 1961 | Rovaniemi | Maire Nylund | Kaarina Kukkonen | Eeva-Lisa Rehman | |
| 1962 | Mikkeli | Pia Vingisaar | Anna-Maija Rissanen | Kaarina Kukkonen | |
| 1963 | Seinäjoki | Anna-Maija Rissanen | Pia Vingisaar | Marja-Liisa Jäntti | |
| 1964 | Lauttasaari | Anna-Maija Rissanen | Pia Vingisaar | Marja-Leena Kekkonen | |
| 1965 | Lahti | Anna-Maija Rissanen | Pia Vingisaar | Marja-Leena Kekkonen | |
| 1966 | Helsinki | Pia Vingisaar | Anna-Maija Rissanen | Leena Patero | |
| 1967 | Helsinki | Pia Vingisaar | Anna-Maija Rissanen | Inger Melander | |
| 1968 | Helsinki | Inger Melander | Anu-Liisa Numminen | Tuula Nylund | |
| 1969 | Tampere | Anna-Maija Kivimäki | Anu-Liisa Numminen | Inger Melander | |
| 1970 | Helsinki | Anu-Liisa Numminen | Pia-Maria Lindén | Anna-Maija Kivimäki | |
| 1971 | Helsinki | Tarja Säde | Pia-Maria Lindén | Anja Franssila | |
| 1972 | Helsinki | Tarja Näsi | Tarja Säde | Pia-Maria Lindén | |
| 1973 | Helsinki | Hannele Koskinen | Susan Broman | Tarja Näsi | |
| 1974 | Helsinki | Susan Broman | Hannele Koskinen | Niina Kyöttinen | |
| 1975 | Helsinki | Niina Kyöttinen | Hannele Koskinen | Susan Broman | |
| 1976 | Helsinki | Niina Kyöttinen | Susan Broman | Kristiina Wegelius | |
| 1977 | Helsinki | Kristiina Wegelius | Susan Broman | Niina Kyöttinen | |
| 1978 | Helsinki | Hannele Koskinen | Niina Kyöttinen | Maria Lowin | |
| 1979 | Tampere | Susan Broman | Pia Snellman | Niina Kyöttinen | |
| 1980 | Helsinki | Pia Snellman | Päivi Nieminen | Riita Kivioja | |
| 1981 | Helsinki | Kristiina Wegelius | Päivi Nieminen | Pia Snellman | |
| 1982 | Helsinki | Kristiina Wegelius | Päivi Nieminen | Liisa Seitsonen | |
| 1983 | Helsinki | Kristiina Wegelius | Susanna Peltola | Nina Östman | |
| 1984 | Helsinki | Susanna Peltola | Anu Nieminen | Marika Tolvanen | |
| 1985 | Helsinki | Elise Ahonen | Nina Östman | Riita Heino | |
| 1986 | Helsinki | Elina Hänninen | Nina Östman | Tiia-Riikka Pietikäinen | |
| 1987 | Tampere | Tiia-Riikka Pietikäinen | Elise Ahonen | Elina Hänninen | |
| 1988 | Turku | Elina Hänninen | Elise Ahonen | Mari Niskanen | |
| 1989 | Helsinki | Elina Hänninen | Mari Niskanen | Mila Kajas | |
| 1990 | Tampere | Meri Karvosenoja | Mari Niskanen | Merja Heikkinen | |
| 1991 | Helsinki | Mila Kajas | Kaisa Kella | Miia Pulkkinen | |
| 1992 | Helsinki | Mila Kajas | Kaisa Kella | Miia Pulkkinen | |
| 1993 | Turku | Mila Kajas | Tuire Kuronen | Kaisa Kella | |
| 1994 | Vantaa | Kaisa Kella | Hannele Lundström | Tuire Kuronen | |
| 1995 | Helsinki | Kaisa Kella | Mila Kajas | Jenni Numminen | |
| 1996 | Espoo | Mila Kajas | Kaisa Kella | Alisa Drei | |
| 1997 | Helsinki | Alisa Drei | Sanna-Maija Wiksten | Annukka Laukkanen | |
| 1998 | Helsinki | Alisa Drei | Annukka Laukkanen | Miia Marttinen | |
| 1999 | Joensuu | Sanna-Maija Wiksten | Alisa Drei | Elina Kettunen | |
| 2000 | Tampere | Susanna Pöykiö | Alisa Drei | Elina Kettunen | |
| 2001 | Mikkeli | Elina Kettunen | Alisa Drei | Susanna Pöykiö | |
| 2002 | Helsinki | Susanna Pöykiö | Elina Kettunen | Alisa Drei | |
| 2003 | Turku | Alisa Drei | Elina Kettunen | Miia Marttinen | |
| 2004 | Vantaa | Alisa Drei | Elina Kettunen | Tytti Tervonen | |
| 2005 | Oulu | Susanna Pöykiö | Kiira Korpi | Elina Kettunen | |
| 2006 | Tampere | Susanna Pöykiö | Alisa Drei | Kiira Korpi | |
| 2007 | Mikkeli | Susanna Pöykiö | Laura Lepistö | Alisa Drei | |
| 2008 | Rauma | Laura Lepistö | Kiira Korpi | Susanna Pöykiö | |
| 2009 | Helsinki | Kiira Korpi | Laura Lepistö | Susanna Pöykiö | |
| 2010 | Jyväskylä | Laura Lepistö | Kiira Korpi | Susanna Pöykiö | |
| 2011 | Turku | Kiira Korpi | Beata Papp | Cecilia Törn | |
| 2012 | Tampere | Kiira Korpi | Juulia Turkkila | Beata Papp | |
| 2013 | Joensuu | Kiira Korpi | Juulia Turkkila | Alisa Mikonsaari | |
| 2014 | Espoo | Juulia Turkkila | Liubov Efimenko | Emilia Toikkanen | |
| 2015 | Vantaa | Kiira Korpi | Jenni Saarinen | Viveca Lindfors | |
| 2016 | Mikkeli | Anni Järvenpää | Jenni Saarinen | Juulia Turkkila | |
| 2017 | Tampere | Emmi Peltonen | Jenni Saarinen | Viveca Lindfors | |
| 2018 | Kouvola | Emmi Peltonen | Viveca Lindfors | Jenni Saarinen | |
| 2019 | Kouvola | Viveca Lindfors | Emmi Peltonen | Jenni Saarinen | |
| 2020 | Vantaa | Emmi Peltonen | Jenni Saarinen | Linnea Ceder | |
| 2021 | Helsinki | Competition cancelled due to the COVID-19 pandemic | | | |
| 2022 | Pori | Jenni Saarinen | Linnea Ceder | Emmi Peltonen | |
| 2023 | Joensuu | Janna Jyrkinen | Nella Pelkonen | Minja Peltonen | |
| 2024 | Helsinki | Nella Pelkonen | Olivia Lisko | Oona Ounasvuori | |
| 2025 | Rauma | Olivia Lisko | Linnea Ceder | Janna Jyrkinen | |
| 2026 | Lahti | Iida Karhunen | Olivia Lisko | Linnea Ceder | |

=== Pairs ===
Senior pairs event medalists
| Year | Location | Gold | Silver | Bronze | Ref. |
|---|---|---|---|---|---|
| 1911 | Helsinki | (Germany); (Finland); Ludowika Eilers; Walter Jakobsson; (Note: Prior to her marriage to Walter Jakobsson, Ludowika Eilers represented Germany in competition.) | No other competitors | | |
| 1912–16 | No pairs competitors | | | | |
| 1917 | Viipuri | Ludowika Jakobsson; Walter Jakobsson | I. Rosenbröijer; P. Ullberg | No other competitors | |
| 1918 | No competition held | | | | |
| 1919 | Helsinki | No pairs competitors | | | |
| 1920 | Turku | Ludowika Jakobsson; Walter Jakobsson | No other competitors | | |
| 1921 | Helsinki | Ludowika Jakobsson; Walter Jakobsson | Elna Henriksson; Raj Ruotsi | No other competitors | |
| 1922 | Helsinki | Ms. Grönman; Mr. Kaarela; (Note: Ms. Grönman and Mr. Kaarela did not receive the minimum required score to be named the Finnish champions.) | No other competitors | | |
| 1923 | Helsinki | G. Häggman; T. Chydenius | No other competitors | | |
| 1924 | Helsinki | Olga Saario; Edvard Linna | No other competitors | | |
| 1925 | No competition held | | | | |
| 1926 | Helsinki | Olga Saario; Edvard Linna | No other competitors | | |
| 1927 | Helsinki | Olga Saario; Edvard Linna | No other competitors | | |
| 1928–37 | No pairs competitors | | | | |
| 1938 | Helsinki | Hilkka Linna; Edvard Linna | Aune Lähteenmäki; Walter Lähteenmäki | Kaino Saari; Erkki Loimuneva | |
| 1939 | Helsinki | Hilkka Linna; Edvard Linna | Kaino Saari; Erkki Loimuneva | No other competitors | |
| 1940 | No competition due to the Winter War | | | | |
| 1941 | Helsinki | Aune Lähteenmäki; Walter Lähteenmäki | No other competitors | | |
| 1942–46 | Helsinki | No pairs competitions due to World War II | | | |
| 1947 | Helsinki | Leena Pietilä; Birger Nyman | Harriet Pantaenius; Lars Björkman | No other competitors | |
| 1948 | Helsinki | Harriet Pantaenius; Lars Björkman | No other competitors | | |
| 1949 | Helsinki | Harriet Pantaenius; Lars Björkman | Inkeri Soininen; Paavo Mäkelä | No other competitors | |
| 1950 | Turku | Harriet Pantaenius; Lars Björkman | Inkeri Soininen; Paavo Mäkelä | No other competitors | |
| 1951 | Oulu | Leena Pietilä; Lars Björkman | Inkeri Soininen; Kalle Tuulos | No other competitors | |
| 1952 | Pori | No pairs competitors | | | |
| 1953 | Turku | Leena Pietilä; Lars Björkman | Inkeri Soininen; Paavo Mäkelä | No other competitors | |
| 1954 | Lahti | Inkeri Soininen; Paavo Mäkelä | No other competitors | | |
| 1955 | Hämeenlinna | Leena Pietilä; Lars Björkman | No other competitors | | |
| 1956 | Helsinki | Soile Drufva; Nils Kankkonen | No other competitors | | |
| 1957 | Helsinki | Soile Drufva; Nils Kankkonen | No other competitors | | |
| 1958 | Turku | Soile Drufva; Nils Kankkonen | Inkeri Soininen; Paavo Mäkelä | Marja-Riita Salmikivi; Jarmo Heinonen | |
| 1959 | No competition held | | | | |
| 1960 | Kuopio | Marketta Thomenius; Ilkka Varhee | Kaija Väisänen; Veikko Poutiainen | Heidi Wacha; Raimo Poutiainen | |
| 1961 | Mikkeli | Soile Drufva; Nils Kankkonen | Kaija Väisänen; Veikko Poutiainen | Heidi Wacha; Raimo Poutiainen | |
| 1962 | Mikkeli | Eeva Sjögren; Ragnar Wikström | No other competitors | | |
| 1963 | Seinäjoki | Anna-Maija Rissanen; Ilkka Varhee | Kaija Väisänen; Risto Soininen | No other competitors | |
| 1964 | Lauttasaari | Anna-Maija Rissanen; Ilkka Varhee | Kaija Väisänen; Risto Soininen | No other competitors | |
| 1965 | Lahti | Kaija Väisänen; Risto Soininen | No other competitors | | |
| 1966 | Helsinki | No pairs competitors | | | |
| 1967 | Helsinki | Tuija Vainikainen; Raimo Turunen | No other competitors | | |
| 1968–81 | No pairs competitors | | | | |
| 1982 | Helsinki | Maija Pekkala; Pekka Pekkala | No other competitors | | |
| 1983 | Helsinki | No pairs competitors | | | |
| 1984 | Helsinki | Maija Pekkala; Pekka Pekkala | No other competitors | | |
| 1985 | Helsinki | Maija Pekkala; Pekka Pekkala | No other competitors | | |
| 1986–2002 | No pairs competitors | | | | |
| 2003 | Turku | Suvi Asikainen; Riku Pötry | No other competitors | | |
| 2004–16 | No pairs competitors | | | | |
| 2017 | Tampere | Emilia Simonen; Matthew Penasse | No other competitors | | |
| 2018–20 | No pairs competitors | | | | |
| 2021 | Helsinki | Competition cancelled due to the COVID-19 pandemic | | | |
| 2022 | Pori | Milania Väänänen; Mikhail Akulov | No other competitors | | |
| 2023 | Joensuu | Milania Väänänen; Filippo Clerici | No other competitors | | |
| 2024 | Helsinki | Milania Väänänen; Filippo Clerici | No other competitors | | |
| 2025 | Rauma | Milania Väänänen; Filippo Clerici | No other competitors | | |
| 2026 | Lahti | No pairs competitors | | | |

=== Ice dance ===
Senior ice dance event medalists
| Year | Location | Gold | Silver | Bronze | Ref. |
|---|---|---|---|---|---|
| 1981 | Helsinki | Saila Saarinen; Kim Jacobson | No other competitors | | |
| 1982–83 | No ice dance competitors | | | | |
| 1984 | Helsinki | Virpi Kunnas; Petri Kokko | Jutta Ohman; Ville Härd | No other competitors | |
| 1985 | Helsinki | Virpi Kunnas; Petri Kokko | Susanna Peltola; Kim Jacobson | No other competitors | |
| 1986 | Helsinki | Susanna Peltola; Kim Jacobson | Susanna Rahkamo; Petri Kokko | Eeva Malinen; Ville Härd | |
| 1987 | Tampere | Susanna Rahkamo; Petri Kokko | Susanna Peltola; Kim Jacobsson | No other competitors | |
| 1988 | Turku | Susanna Rahkamo; Petri Kokko | No other competitors | | |
| 1989 | Helsinki | Susanna Rahkamo; Petri Kokko | No other competitors | | |
| 1990 | Tampere | Susanna Rahkamo; Petri Kokko | Katri Uski; Juha Sasi | No other competitors | |
| 1991 | Helsinki | Susanna Rahkamo; Petri Kokko | Katri Uski; Juha Sasi | No other competitors | |
| 1992 | Helsinki | Katri Uski; Juha Sasi | Johanna Lahdenranta; Tommy Roininen | No other competitors | |
| 1993 | Turku | Tuire Haahti; Toni Mattila | No other competitors | | |
| 1994 | Vantaa | Katri Kuusniemi; Juha Sasi | Tuire Haahti; Toni Mattila | No other competitors | |
| 1995 | Helsinki | Susanna Rahkamo; Petri Kokko | Maikki Uotila; Toni Mattila | No other competitors | |
| 1996 | Espoo | Katri Kuusniemi; Jamie Walker | Maikki Uotila; Toni Mattila | No other competitors | |
| 1997 | Helsinki | Maikki Uotila; Toni Mattila | No other competitors | | |
| 1998 | Helsinki | Maikki Uotila; Michel Bigras | No other competitors | | |
| 1999 | Joensuu | Pia-Maria Gustafsson; Antti Grönlund | No other competitors | | |
| 2000–01 | No ice dance competitors | | | | |
| 2002 | Helsinki | Jessica Huot; Juha Valkama | No other competitors | | |
| 2003 | Turku | Jessica Huot; Juha Valkama | No other competitors | | |
| 2004 | Vantaa | Jessica Huot; Juha Valkama | No other competitors | | |
| 2005–07 | No ice dance competitors | | | | |
| 2008 | Rauma | Piia Juhamo; Niko Jääskeläinen | No other competitors | | |
| 2009 | Helsinki | Oksana Klimova; Sasha Palomäki | Henna Lindholm; Ossi Kanervo | No other competitors | |
| 2010 | Jyväskylä | Oksana Klimova; Sasha Palomäki | Henna Lindholm; Ossi Kanervo | No other competitors | |
| 2011 | Turku | Henna Lindholm; Ossi Kanervo | No other competitors | | |
| 2012 | Tampere | Henna Lindholm; Ossi Kanervo | Olesia Karmi; Max Lindholm | No other competitors | |
| 2013 | Joensuu | Olesia Karmi; Max Lindholm | Henna Lindholm; Ossi Kanervo | No other competitors | |
| 2014 | Espoo | Henna Lindholm; Ossi Kanervo | Cecilia Törn; Jussiville Partanen | Olesia Karmi; Max Lindholm | |
| 2015 | Vantaa | Olesia Karmi; Max Lindholm | Cecilia Törn; Jussiville Partanen | No other competitors | |
| 2016 | Mikkeli | Cecilia Törn; Jussiville Partanen | Olesia Karmi; Max Lindholm | No other competitors | |
| 2017 | Tampere | Cecilia Törn; Jussiville Partanen | Juulia Turkkila; Matthias Versluis | No other competitors | |
| 2018 | Kouvola | Cecilia Törn; Jussiville Partanen | Juulia Turkkila; Matthias Versluis | Monica Lindfors; Juho Pirinen | |
| 2019 | Kouvola | Juulia Turkkila; Matthias Versluis | No other competitors | | |
| 2020 | Vantaa | Yuka Orihara; Juho Pirinen | Arina Klinovitskaya; Jussiville Partanen | No other competitors | |
| 2021 | Helsinki | Competition cancelled due to the COVID-19 pandemic | | | |
| 2022 | Pori | Juulia Turkkila; Matthias Versluis | Yuka Orihara; Juho Pirinen | No other competitors | |
| 2023 | Joensuu | Juulia Turkkila; Matthias Versluis | Yuka Orihara; Juho Pirinen | No other competitors | |
| 2024 | Helsinki | Juulia Turkkila; Matthias Versluis | Yuka Orihara; Juho Pirinen | No other competitors | |
| 2025 | Rauma | Juulia Turkkila; Matthias Versluis | Yuka Orihara; Juho Pirinen | Daniela Ivanitskiy; Matthew Sperry | |
| 2026 | Lahti | Juulia Turkkila; Matthias Versluis | Yuka Orihara; Juho Pirinen | Daniela Ivanitskiy; Matthew Sperry | |

== Junior medalists ==
Although junior-level championships were held in Finland prior to 1998, this is the earliest for which full results have been documented.

=== Men's singles ===
Junior men's event medalists
| Year | Location | Gold | Silver | Bronze | Ref. |
|---|---|---|---|---|---|
| 1998 | Helsinki | Ari-Pekka Nurmenkari | Riku Pötry | Joni Juvonen | |
| 1999 | Joensuu | Ari-Pekka Nurmenkari | Joni Juvonen | Antti Aalto | |
| 2000 | Tampere | Ari-Pekka Nurmenkari | Mikko Minkkinen | Visa Tuominen | |
| 2001 | Mikkeli | Ari-Pekka Nurmenkari | Visa Tuominen | Mikko Minkkinen | |
| 2002 | Helsinki | Mikko Minkkinen | Tommi Piironen | Antti Aalto | |
| 2003 | Turku | Tommi Piironen | Valtter Virtanen | Lasse Lundström | |
| 2004 | Vantaa | Tommi Piironen | Valtter Virtanen | Henry Rautiainen | |
| 2005 | Oulu | Valtter Virtanen | Samuli Tyyskä | Jarno Perokorpi | |
| 2006 | Tampere | Samuli Tyyskä | Otto Kumpulainen | Otto-Eemeli Laamanen | |
| 2007 | Mikkeli | Samuli Tyyskä | Otto-Eemeli Laamanen | Matthias Versluis | |
| 2008 | Rauma | Bela Papp | Samuli Tyyskä | Otto-Eemeli Laamanen | |
| 2009 | Helsinki | Bela Papp | Matthias Versluis | Otto-Eemeli Laamanen | |
| 2010 | Jyväskylä | Viktor Zubik | Julian Lagus | Bela Papp | |
| 2011 | Turku | Matthias Versluis | Julian Lagus | Juho Pirinen | |
| 2012 | Tampere | Tino Olenius | Juho Pirinen | Erik Martoma | |
| 2013 | Joensuu | Tino Olenius | Juho Pirinen | Erik Martoma | |
| 2014 | Espoo | Roman Galay | Juho Pirinen | Tino Olenius | |
| 2015 | Vantaa | Roman Galay | Tino Olenius | Juho Pirinen | |
| 2016 | Mikkeli | Kasperi Riihimäki | Lauri Lankila | No other competitors | |
| 2017 | Tampere | Benjam Papp | Lucas Tiilikainen | Mikla Rasia | |
| 2018 | Kouvola | Benjam Papp | Lauri Lankila | Mikla Rasia | |
| 2019 | Kouvola | Lauri Lankila | Lucas Tiilikainen | Nuutti Järvinen | |
| 2020 | Vantaa | Jan Ollikainen | Makar Suntsev | Mattias Lindfors | |
| 2021 | Helsinki | Competition cancelled due to the COVID-19 pandemic | | | |
| 2022 | Pori | Matias Lindfors | Jaroslav Krestyannikov | Arttu Juusola | |
| 2023 | Joensuu | Jari Krestyannikov | Matias Heinonen | Severi Varpio | |
| 2024 | Helsinki | Matias Heinonen | Anton Erkama | Benjamin Eriksson | |
| 2025 | Rauma | Matias Heinonen | Benjamin Eriksson | Anton Erkama | |
| 2026 | Lahti | Anton Erkama | Matias Heinonen | Henri Moisio | |

=== Women's singles ===
Junior women's event medalists
| Year | Location | Gold | Silver | Bronze | Ref. |
|---|---|---|---|---|---|
| 1998 | Helsinki | Susanna Pöykiö | Kati Simola | Tiina Weckman | |
| 1999 | Joensuu | Susanna Pöykiö | Kati Simola | Marjut Turunen | |
| 2000 | Tampere | Tytti Tervonen | Taru Karvosenoja | Soila Jalava | |
| 2001 | Mikkeli | Mari Hirvonen | Sari Hakola | Henni Lehtiranta | |
| 2002 | Helsinki | Sari Hakola | Henna Hietala | Mona Grannenfelt | |
| 2003 | Turku | Laura Lepistö | Kiira Korpi | Hanna Kaijimaa | |
| 2004 | Vantaa | Kiira Korpi | Mona Grannenfelt | Elina Vesamäki | |
| 2005 | Oulu | Laura Lepistö | Henriikka Hietaniemi | Anna Heinonen | |
| 2006 | Tampere | Krista Suhonen | Jenni Vähämaa | Sissi Keränen | |
| 2007 | Mikkeli | Jenni Vähämaa | Sofia Otala | Oona Lindahl | |
| 2008 | Rauma | Alisa Mikonsaari | Sofia Otala | Sera Väistö | |
| 2009 | Helsinki | Alisa Mikonsaari | Noora Pitkänen | Sofia Otala | |
| 2010 | Jyväskylä | Beata Papp | Cecilia Törn | Timila Shtrestha | |
| 2011 | Turku | Juulia Turkkila | Nea Viiri | Seidi Rantanen | |
| 2012 | Tampere | Eveliina Viljanen | Emilia Toikkanen | Krista Pitkäniemi | |
| 2013 | Joensuu | Lyydia Määttänen | Liubov Efimenko | Jenni Saarinen | |
| 2014 | Espoo | Jenni Saarinen | Emmi Peltonen | Viveca Lindfors | |
| 2015 | Vantaa | Karoliina Luhtonen | Anni Järvenpää | Joanna Kallela | |
| 2016 | Mikkeli | Sallianna Öztürk | Joanna Kallela | Emma Niemi | |
| 2017 | Tampere | Sofia Sula | Jade Rautiainen | Linnea Ceder | |
| 2018 | Kouvola | Sofia Sula | Vera Stolt | Laura Karhunen | |
| 2019 | Kouvola | Fanny Lindfors | Milania Väänänen | Mai Helske | |
| 2020 | Vantaa | Nella Pelkonen | Olivia Lisko | Janna Jyrkinen | |
| 2021 | Helsinki | Competition cancelled due to the COVID-19 pandemic | | | |
| 2022 | Pori | Janna Jyrkinen | Petra Lahti | Iida Karhunen | |
| 2023 | Joensuu | Iida Karhunen | Rosa Reponen | Petra Lahti | |
| 2024 | Helsinki | Iida Karhunen | Petra Lahti | Karina Innos | |
| 2025 | Rauma | Iida Karhunen | Venla Sinisalo | Annika Pellonmaa | |
| 2026 | Lahti | Venla Sinisalo | Annika Pellonmaa | Saaga Volkova | |

=== Pairs ===
Junior pairs event medalists
| Year | Location | Gold | Silver | Bronze | Ref. |
|---|---|---|---|---|---|
| 1998–99 | No junior pairs competitors | | | | |
| 2000 | Tampere | Suvi Asikainen; Riku Pötry | No other competitors | | |
| 2001 | Mikkeli | Suvi Asikainen; Riku Pötry | No other competitors | | |
No junior pairs competitors since 2001

=== Ice dance ===
Junior ice dance event medalists
| Year | Location | Gold | Silver | Bronze | Ref. |
|---|---|---|---|---|---|
| 1998 | Helsinki | Pia Maria Gustafsson; Antti Grönlund | No other competitors | | |
| 1999 | Joensuu | No junior ice dance competitors | | | |
| 2000 | Tampere | Jessica Huot; Juha Valkama | Marleena Mäntymaa; Lauri Hynninen | No other competitors | |
| 2001 | Mikkeli | Jessica Huot; Juha Valkama | Emmi Leppik; Marco Saracino | No other competitors | |
| 2002–06 | No junior ice dance competitors | | | | |
| 2007 | Mikkeli | Janna Hujanen; Ossi Kanervo | Crista Grönroos; Eero Kivinen | Iris Westerlund; Sasha Palomäki | |
| 2008 | Rauma | Oksana Klimova; Sasha Palomäki | Crista Grönroos; Eero Kivinen | No other competitors | |
| 2009 | Helsinki | Olesia Karmi; Eero Kivinen | Riikka Peura; Maxim Lindholm | No other competitors | |
| 2010 | Jyväskylä | Olesia Karmi; Max Lindholm | No other competitors | | |
| 2011 | Turku | Olesia Karmi; Max Lindholm | Laima Krasnitskaja; Jussiville Partanen | No other competitors | |
| 2012 | Tampere | Sara Aghai; Jussiville Partanen | No other competitors | | |
| 2013 | Joensuu | Sara Aghai; Jussiville Partanen | No other competitors | | |
| 2014–15 | No junior ice dance competitors | | | | |
| 2016 | Mikkeli | Kaisa Ukkonen; Antonio Viitanen | Viola Kumpulainen; Kaius Kumpulainen | No other competitors | |
| 2017 | Tampere | Monica Lindfors; Juho Pirinen | No other competitors | | |
| 2018 | Kouvola | No junior ice dance competitors | | | |
| 2019 | Kouvola | Margareta Poutiainen; Mirko Niskanen | No other competitors | | |
| 2020 | Vantaa | Daniela Ivanitskiy; Samu Kyyhkynen | Sanni Rytkönen; Miitri Niskanen | Margareta Poutiainen; Mirko Niskanen | |
| 2021 | Helsinki | Competition cancelled due to the COVID-19 pandemic | | | |
| 2022 | Pori | Daniela Ivanitskiy; David Goldshteyn | Emma Aalto; Lucas Tiilikainen | Hilda Taylor; Urho Reina | |
| 2023 | Joensuu | Hilda Taylor; Urho Reina | No other competitors | | |
| 2024 | Helsinki | Hilda Taylor; Nolen Hickey | Enna Kesti; Oskari Liedenpohja | Cilla Laine; Urho Reina | |
| 2025 | Rauma | Hilda Taylor; Alexander Buchholdt | Enna Kesti; Oskari Liedenpohja | Cilla Laine; Urho Reina | |
| 2026 | Lahti | Eva Rozhnova; Platon Zubkov | Iris Lahti; Oskari Liedenpohja | Cilla Laine; Urho Reina | |

== Records ==
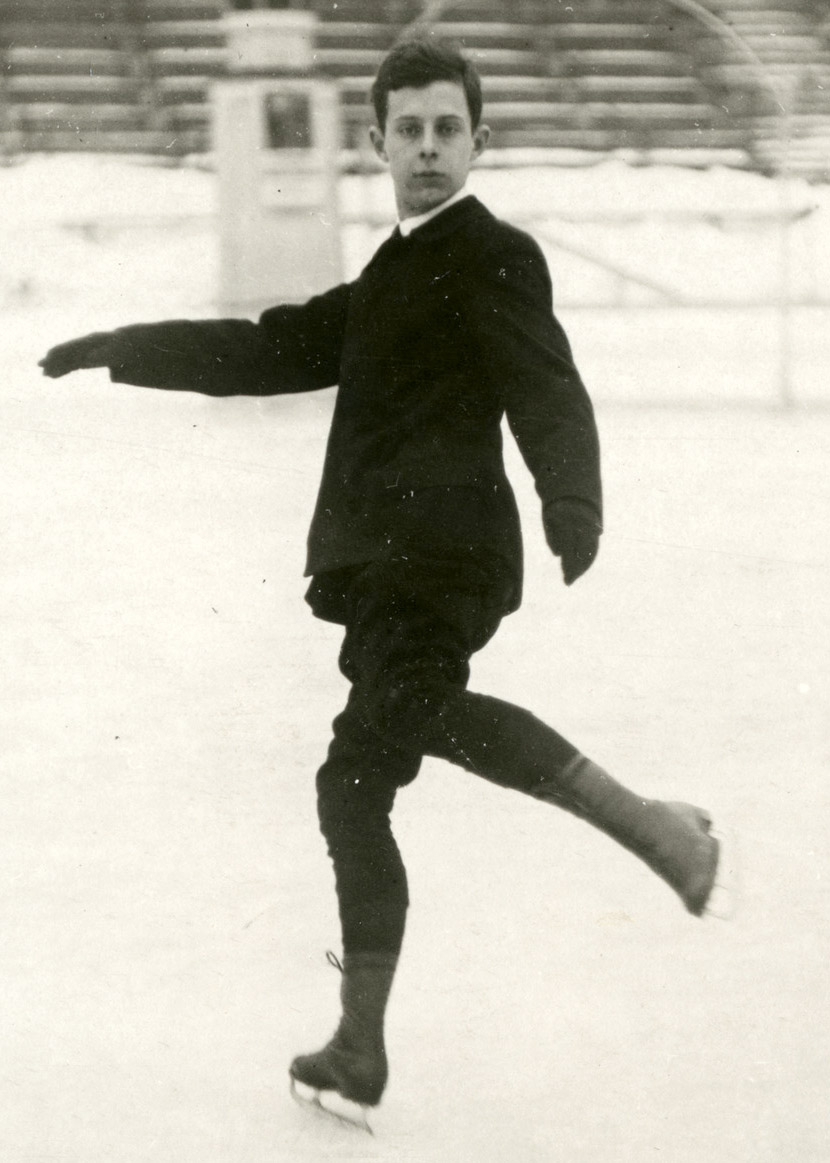
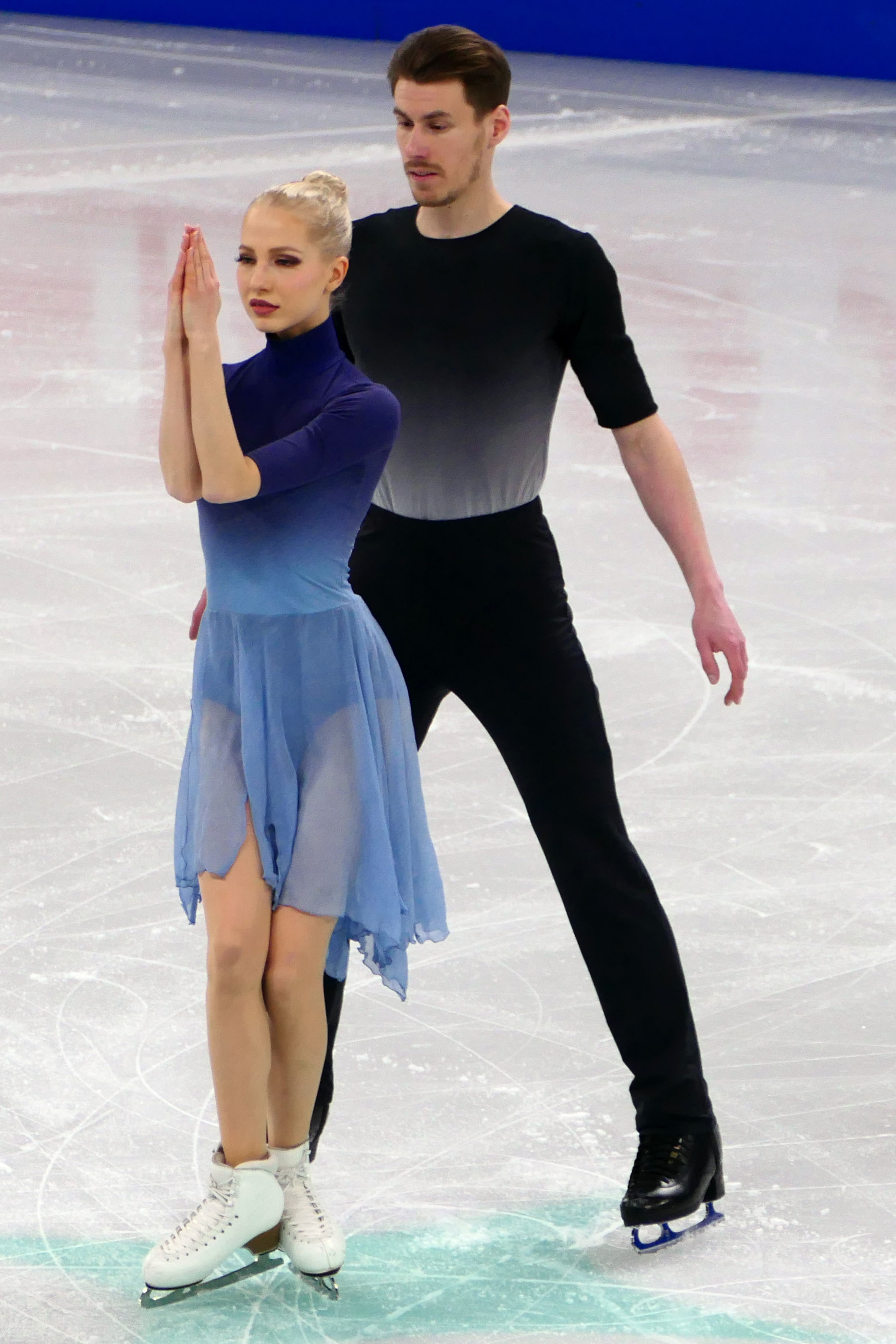
From left to right: Marcus Nikkanen won ten Finnish Championship titles in men's singles, while Juulia Turkkila and Matthias Versluis have won six Finnish Championship titles in ice dance.

Records
| Discipline | Most championship titles | | | |
| Discipline | Skater(s) | No. | Years | Ref. |
|---|---|---|---|---|
| Men's singles | Marcus Nikkanen | 10 | 1927–30; 1934–35; 1938–39; 1945–46 | |
| Women's singles | Maj-Len Helin | 8 | 1937–39; 1941–45 | |
| Pairs | Lars Björkman; (Note: Lars Björkman won three championship titles while partnered with Harriet Pantaenius (1948–50), and three with Leena Pietilä (1951, 1953, 1955).) | 6 | 1948–51; 1953; 1955 | |
| Ice dance | Susanna Rahkamo; Petri Kokko | 6 | 1987–91; 1995 | |
| Ice dance | Petri Kokko; (Note: Petri Kokko won two championship titles while partnered with Virpi Kunnas (1984–85), and six with Susanna Rahkamo (1987–91, 1995).) | 8 | 1984–85; 1987–91; 1995 | |
| Ice dance | Juulia Turkkila; Matthias Versluis | 6 | 2019; 2022–26 | |
