= Minkkinen =

Minkkinen is a Finnish surname. Notable people with the surname include:

- Jaakko Minkkinen (born 1933), Finnish sports shooter
- Arno Rafael Minkkinen (born 1945), Finnish photographer
- Mikko Minkkinen (born 1984), Finnish figure skater
- Suvi Minkkinen (born 1994), Finnish biathlete
