= Maikki Uotila =

Finnish former ice dancer (born 1977)

Personal information
- Other names: Kraatz
- Born: 25 February 1977 (age 49) Espoo, Finland
- Height: 1.68 m (5 ft 6 in)

Figure skating career
- Country: Finland
- Partner: Toni Mattila, Michel Bigras
- Coach: Arja Wuorivirta, Martin Skotnicky
- Skating club: HSK Helsinki
- Retired: c. 1998

Maikki Uotila-Kraatz (born 25 February 1977) is a Finnish former ice dancer. With Toni Mattila, she is the 1997 Finnish national champion and competed in the final segment at the 1996 European Championships.

== Personal life ==
Uotila was born on 25 February 1977 in Espoo, Finland. She received a Bachelor of Arts in dance from Sarah Lawrence College in New York. In 2004, she settled in Vancouver, British Columbia, Canada. She married Victor Kraatz on 19 June 2004. They have two sons – Oliver (born 14 September 2006) and Henry (born 10 July 2010).

== Career ==
=== Competitive ===
Uotila competed as a single skater until 1994, winning the junior silver medal at the 1992 Nordic Championships. In 1994, she switched to ice dancing, teaming up Toni Mattila. They competed in the free dance at the 1996 European Championships in Sofia, Bulgaria, finishing 23rd. They also appeared at the 1996 World Championships in Edmonton, Alberta, Canada, but were eliminated after the compulsory dances.

After two silver medals, Uotila/Mattila won the Finnish national title in the 1996–1997 season. They placed 26th at the 1997 European Championships in Paris, France. They were coached by Arja Wuorivirta and Martin Skotnicky. They ended their partnership in 1997 after three seasons together.

Uotila competed with Michel Bigras in the 1997–1998 season.

=== Post-competitive ===
Uotila coaches ice dancing at the BC Centre of Excellence. She has also worked as a dance instructor at the Shadbolt Centre for the Arts in Burnaby.

== Programs ==
(with Mattila)

Season	Original dance	Free dance
1996–1997		West Side Story by Leonard Bernstein performed by the Boston Pops Orchestra choreo. by Shanti Ruchpaul

== Competitive highlights ==
=== Ice dancing with Bigras ===
National
Event	1997–98
Finnish Championships	1st

=== Ice dancing with Mattila ===
International
Event	1994–95	1995–96	1996–97
World Championships		31st	
European Championships		23rd	26th
Autumn Trophy			11th
Baltic Cup	1st		
Basler Cup	12th		
Czech Skate		14th	
Finlandia Trophy		12th	6th
PFSA Trophy			12th
National
Finnish Championships	2nd	2nd	1st

=== Ladies' singles ===
International
Event	1991–92	1992–93	1993–94
PFSA Trophy			15th
Nordic Championships	2nd J	6th J	6th J
J = Junior level
