= Hannele Koskinen =

Finnish figure skater

Personal information
- Other names: Hannele Antikainen

Figure skating career
- Country: Finland
- Retired: 1978

Hannele Koskinen, also Antikainen, is a Finnish former competitive figure skater. She is the 1978 Nordic champion and a two-time Finnish national champion (1973, 1978), representing Helsingin taitoluisteluklubi.

== Competitive highlights ==
International
Event	1973	1974	1975	1976	1977	1978
World Champ.	22nd					
Nordics		2nd		2nd		1st
National
Finnish Champ.	1st					1st
