= Markus Leminen =

Finnish figure skater (born 1975)

Personal information
- Born: 14 October 1975 (age 50) Vantaa, Finland
- Height: 1.76 m (5 ft 9 1/2 in)

Figure skating career
- Country: Finland
- Began skating: 1982
- Retired: 2002

Markus Peter Leminen (born 14 October 1975 in Vantaa) is a Finnish former figure skater who competed in men's singles. He is a six-time Finnish national champion. He coaches at the Bradford District Skating Club in Bradford, Ontario, Canada.

== Programs ==
Season	Short program	Free skating
2001–02	Brothers in Arms by Dire Straits; Blood Suckin' Leeches by Dixie Dregs	Carlito's Way by Patrick Doyle; Mobsters by Michael Small; The Untouchables by Ennio Morricone
2000–01	Gettysburg by Randy Edelman	Carlito's Way by Patrick Doyle; Mobsters by Michael Small; The Untouchables by Ennio Morricone

== Results ==
GP: Champions Series/Grand Prix

International
Event	91–92	92–93	93–94	94–95	95–96	96–97	97–98	98–99	99–00	00–01	01–02
Worlds			23rd	15th	33rd	29th	19th	24th	21st	24th	21st
Europeans			19th	15th	14th	13th	23rd	29th	32nd	12th	26th
GP Cup of Russia								10th			
GP Skate Canada					15th		12th	10th			
Trophée de France				11th							
Finlandia Trophy						11th		4th			
Nebelhorn Trophy						7th	9th				
Nordics				1st	1st						
Piruetten						5th					
Schäfer Memorial							13th				
International: Junior
Junior Worlds	20th		16th								
EYOF		1st									
National
Finnish Champ.	1st	1st		1st	1st	1st	1st	1st	1st	1st	1st
