= Oksana Klimova =

Russian ice dancer

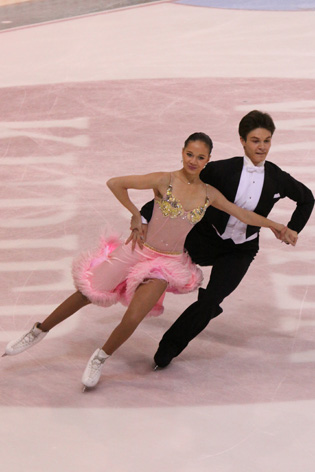
- Klimova & Palomäki in 2009.

Personal information
- Full name: Oksana Анатольевна Klimova
- Born: 24 May 1992 (age 34) Moscow
- Height: 1.69 m (5 ft 7 in)

Figure skating career
- Country: Finland
- Coach: Ksenia Rumiantseva, Elena Tchaikovskaia
- Skating club: Helsingfors Skridskoklubb

Oksana Anatolievna Klimova (Russian: Оксана Анатольевна Климова; born 24 May 1992) is a Russian former competitive ice dancer. She competed with Sasha Palomäki for Finland from 2007 to 2010. They are the 2009 & 2010 Finnish national champions. They teamed up in summer 2007.

== Competitive highlights ==
(with Palomäki)

Event	2007–2008	2008–2009	2009–2010
European Championships		22nd	24th
World Junior Championships	23rd	24th	
Finnish Championships	1st J.	1st	1st
Finlandia Trophy		7th	
Golden Spin of Zagreb		7th	
Junior Grand Prix, Croatia			6th
Junior Grand Prix, Germany			8th
Junior Grand Prix, Mexico		7th	
Junior Grand Prix, France		11th	
Pavel Roman Memorial	4th J.		

- J = Junior level
