= Sasha Palomäki =

Finnish ice dancer

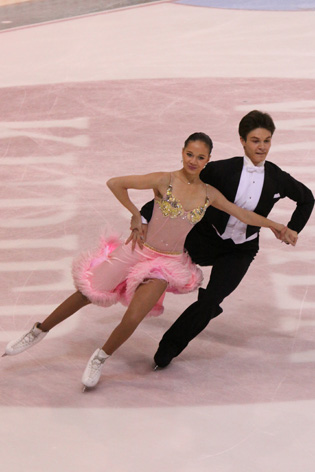
- Klimova and Palomäki in 2009.

Personal information
- Born: 4 September 1991 (age 35) Espoo, Finland
- Height: 1.83 m (6 ft 0 in)

Figure skating career
- Country: Finland
- Coach: Ksenia Rumiantseva, Elena Tchaikovskaia
- Skating club: Helsingfors Skridskoklubb

Sasha Palomäki (born 4 September 1991) is a Finnish former competitive ice dancer.

Palomäki teamed up with Russian ice dancer Oksana Klimova in the summer of 2007. They are the 2009 and 2010 Finnish national champions. They split after the 2009–10 season.

== Competitive highlights ==
With Klimova

Event	2007–2008	2008–2009	2009–2010
European Championships		22nd	24th
World Junior Championships	23rd	24th	
Finnish Championships	1st J.	1st	1st
Finlandia Trophy		7th	
Golden Spin of Zagreb		7th	
Junior Grand Prix, Croatia			6th
Junior Grand Prix, Germany			8th
Junior Grand Prix, Mexico		7th	
Junior Grand Prix, France		11th	
Pavel Roman Memorial	4th J.		

- J = Junior level

With Westerlund

Event	2005–2006
Finnish Championships	3rd
