= Kristiina Wegelius =

Finnish figure skater

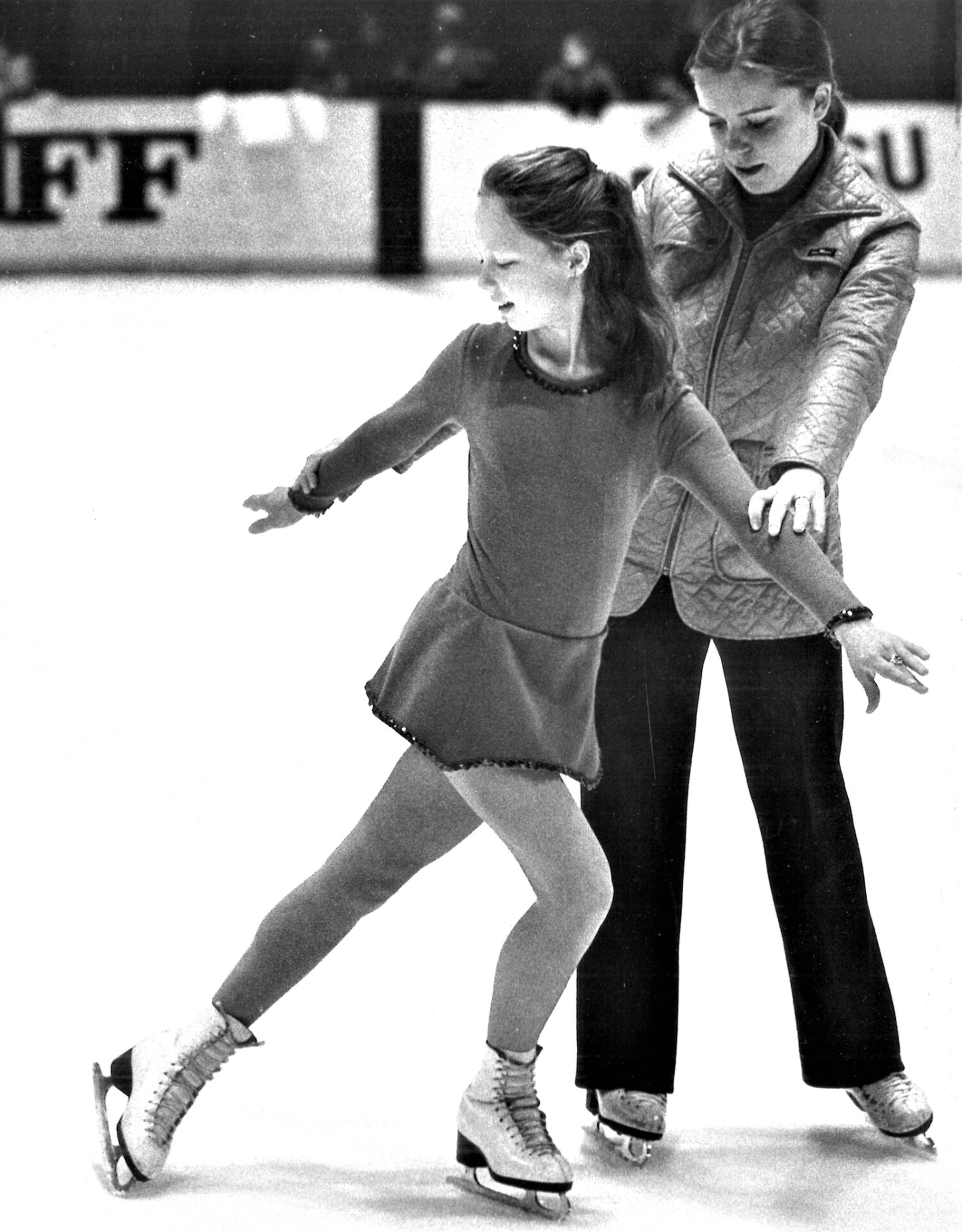

Personal information
- Full name: Kristiina Marketta Wegelius
- Other names: Kristiina Fitzpatrick
- Born: 12 October 1960 (age 66) Helsinki, Finland
- Height: 1.62 m (5 ft 4 in)

Figure skating career
- Country: Finland
- Retired: 1983

Kristiina Marketta "Tintti" Wegelius (born 12 October 1960) is a Finnish former competitive figure skater. She won medals at Skate Canada International, Skate America, and NHK Trophy, as well as four Finnish national titles. Wegelius placed tenth at the 1980 Winter Olympics, as high as sixth at the World Championships (1981, 1983), and as high as fourth at the European Championships (1979, 1980, 1981). She was coached by Carlo Fassi.

After retiring from competition, Wegelius performed with Disney on Ice and became a skating coach and choreographer. As of January 2009, she was living with her husband and daughter, Khayla (born c. 1998), in Quebec City, Canada.

== Results ==
International
Event	74–75	75–76	76–77	77–78	78–79	79–80	80–81	81–82	82–83
Olympics						10th			
Worlds				14th	10th	8th	6th	9th	6th
Europeans			7th	6th	4th	4th	4th	6th	6th
Skate America									3rd
Skate Canada					3rd				2nd
NHK Trophy								1st	
Ennia Challenge				3rd					
Richmond Trophy				2nd					
Nordics	3rd	1st	1st						
National
Finnish Champ.			1st				1st	1st	1st
