= Bela Papp =

Finnish figure skater (born 1994)

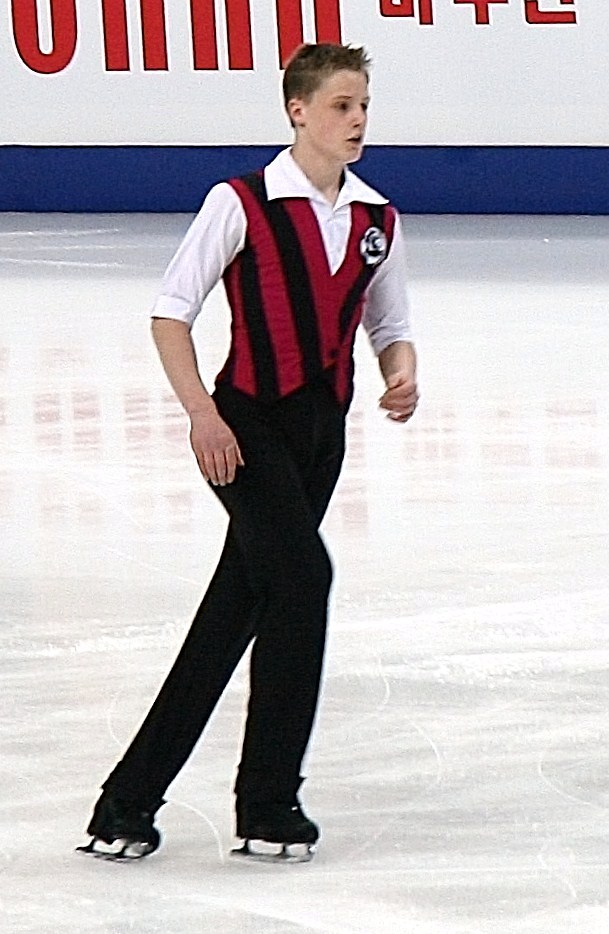
- Papp at the 2011 Worlds

Personal information
- Born: 9 March 1994 (age 32) Kuopio, Finland
- Height: 1.79 m (5 ft 10 1/2 in)

Figure skating career
- Country: Finland
- Coach: Bruno Delmaestro, Kelly Champagne
- Skating club: Hermes, Kokkola
- Began skating: 2000

Bela Papp (born 9 March 1994) is a Finnish figure skater. He is the 2011 Finnish national champion. Selected to compete at four consecutive World Junior Championships, he qualified twice for the free skate. Papp also competed at various different Junior Grand Prix events as well as represented Finland at two consecutive University Games (Universiade). Papp has won the Finnish title in all of the categories and was the youngest man to win the Senior title at the age of 16.

== Personal life ==
Bela Papp was born on 9 March 1994 in Kuopio, Finland. His mother, Ulla, is a figure skating coach, and his siblings—Beata, Bettina, Benjam—have all competed in the sport. His American-born father is of Hungarian descent and had moved to Finland when he was five years old. He relocated to British Columbia, Canada, in July 2007. As of 2014, he is a student at Simon Fraser University. Papp is currently a master's degree student at the University of Jyväskylä.

== Career ==
In the 2007–08 season, Papp was sent to Lake Placid, New York, to compete at his first ISU Junior Grand Prix event. After winning the Finnish national junior title, he was assigned to the 2008 World Junior Championships in Sofia, Bulgaria but did not qualify for the free skate. The following season, Papp repeated as the Finnish junior champion. He was eliminated before the free skate again at the 2009 World Junior Championships but was successful at the 2010 World Junior Championships in The Hague, Netherlands, where he finished 24th.

In the 2010–11 season, Papp won the Finnish national title on the senior level. He was assigned to the 2011 World Junior Championships in Gangneung, South Korea, where he placed 22nd, and the 2011 World Championships in Moscow, where he was eliminated after the preliminary round. Surgery on the L5 bilateral pars in his lower back kept him out of competition in the 2012–13 season.

== Programs ==
Season	Short program	Free skating
2016–2017	Requiem for a Dream by Clint Mansell	Tron Medley by Daft Punk
2013–2014	Hotel California	Thunder by Nuttin' But Stringz; Tango
2011–2012	Butterflies and Hurricanes by Muse	Summer in the High Grassland by Zhao Jiping; Beirut Taxi (from Syriana) by Alexandre Desplat; Crathadh't' Aodaich Zdabda by Mouth Music Mo-di; Prarthana (from Cirque du Soleil's Koozå) by Jean-Francois Coté
2009–2010	Dramatico by Edvin Marton	Triplets of Belleville by Ben Charest; La Valse D'Amelie by Yann Tiersen
2008–2009	Dramatico by Edvin Marton	Satori Mix by Kodo; Stobe's Nanafushi; Scorchio by Bond
2006–2008	The Godfather soundtrack by Nino Rota; Acoustic Alchemy; The Netting Hill	Satori Mix by Kodo; Stobe's Nanafushi; Scorchio by Bond

== Competitive highlights ==
CS: Challenger Series; JGP: Junior Grand Prix

International
Event	06–07	07–08	08–09	09–10	10–11	11–12	13–14	14–15	15–16	16–17	17–18
World Champ.					20th P						
CS Finlandia										15th	16th
CS Autumn Classic								13th			
CS U.S. Classic								8th	10th		
Bavarian Open										11th	
Finlandia Trophy						15th					
Nebelhorn Trophy							23rd				
Nordics					8th						
Volvo Open Cup							21st				
Universiade								27th		25th	
International: Junior
World Jr. Champ.		29th	30th	24th	22nd						
JGP Australia						13th					
JGP Austria						17th					
JGP Germany					16th						
JGP Romania					14th						
JGP U.K.			11th								
JGP U.S.		12th		13th							
National
Finnish Champ.	4th J	1st J	1st J	3rd J	1st	3rd	3rd	5th	5th		2nd
J = Junior level; P = Preliminary round Papp did not compete in the 2012–13 season.
