= Oula Jääskeläinen =

Finnish figure skater

Personal information
- Full name: Panu Oula Jääskeläinen
- Born: 8 March 1969 (age 57) Espoo, Finland
- Height: 1.87 m (6 ft 1 1/2 in)

Figure skating career
- Country: Finland
- Retired: 1994

Panu Oula Jääskeläinen (born 8 March 1969) is a Finnish former competitive figure skater. He is the 1992 Piruetten silver medalist, a two-time Nordic bronze medalist, and a five-time Finnish national champion. He represented Finland at the 1992 Winter Olympics.

== Personal life ==
Jääskeläinen was born on 8 March 1969 in Espoo, Finland. His sister, Anu Oksanen (née Jääskeläinen), is the head coach for the synchronized skating team Marigold IceUnity, who are multiple world champions.

== Career ==
Jääskeläinen was sent to ten European Championships from 1985 to 1994, achieving his best result, eighth, at the 1993 event in Helsinki. He also competed at nine World Championships and reached his highest placement, 12th, at the 1991 event in Munich. Jääskeläinen was selected to represent Finland at the 1992 Winter Olympics in Albertville and finished 19th. During his career, he trained at the Mariposa School of Skating in Barrie, Ontario, Canada.

Jääskeläinen retired from competition in 1994 and then joined an ice show in Blackpool, England. He also appeared on Strictly Ice Dancing, partnering with celebrity Carol Smillie.

He began coaching in Cape Town, South Africa, in around 2006 or 2007.

== Results ==
International
Event	84–85	85–86	86–87	87–88	88–89	89–90	90–91	91–92	92–93	93–94
Olympics								19th		
Worlds	22nd	24th	23rd	22nd	24th	20th	12th	30th	16th	
Europeans	16th	19th	12th	16th	16th	17th	12th	14th	8th	24th
Skate America			14th							
Skate Canada								6th		
Inter. de Paris										10th
NHK Trophy	10th									
Piruetten									2nd	
Nordics						3rd				3rd
National
Finnish Champ.	1st	1st	1st				1st			1st
