= Kaisa Kella =

Finnish figure skater

Figure skating career
- Country: Finland
- Retired: 1996

Kaisa Kella is a Finnish former competitive figure skater. She is a three-time Nordic champion and a two-time Finnish national champion. Kella placed 11th at the 1992 World Junior Championships and 21st at the 1993 European Championships.

== Competitive highlights ==
International
Event	1991	1992	1993	1994	1995	1996
European Champ.	22nd		21st		26th	
World Junior Champ.	22nd	11th				
Nordics		1st	1st	2nd		1st
National
Finnish Champ.				1st	1st	2nd
