= Susan Broman =

Finnish figure skater (born 1959)

Personal information
- Full name: Susan Mirjam Broman
- Other names: Lönnqvist
- Born: 28 July 1959 (age 66) Helsinki, Finland
- Height: 1.64 m (5 ft 4 1/2 in)

Figure skating career
- Country: Finland
- Skating club: Helsingin taitoluisteluklubi
- Retired: 1980

Susan Mirjam Broman, married name Lönnqvist, (born 28 July 1959) is a Finnish former competitive figure skater. She is a two-time Finnish national champion (1974, 1979) and competed at the 1980 Winter Olympics in Lake Placid, New York, finishing 17th.

== Competitive highlights ==
International
Event	73–74	74–75	75–76	76–77	77–78	78–79	79–80
Winter Olympics							17th
World Champ.	27th			16th			17th
European Champ.	26th	24th			15th	13th	14th
Ennia Challenge					2nd		
Nordics	3rd	1st	3rd		2nd	1st	
National
Finnish Champ.	1st					1st	
WD: Withdrew
