= Edvard Linna =

Finnish artistic gymnast

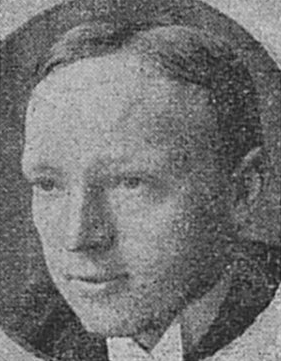
- Linna, unknown date

Personal information
- Full name: Edvard Ferdinand Linna
- Alternative name: Edvard Ferdinand Borg
- Born: 26 August 1886 Mikkeli, Grand Duchy of Finland, Russian Empire
- Died: 30 December 1974 (aged 88) Helsinki, Finland
- Height: 172 cm (5 ft 8 in)

Gymnastics career
- Discipline: Men's artistic gymnastics
- Country represented: Finland
- Club: Ylioppilasvoimistelijat
Medal record
Men's artistic gymnastics
Representing Finland
Olympic Games
Bronze medal – third place	1908 London	Team

Edvard Ferdinand Linna (26 August 1886 – 30 December 1974) was a Finnish gymnast who won bronze in the 1908 Summer Olympics.

== Early life ==
Linna was born Edvard Ferdinand Borg on 26 August 1886. He Finnicized his family name from Borg to Linna on 23 June 1906.

== Gymnastics career ==
Edvard Linna at the Olympic Games
Games	Event	Rank	Notes
1908 Summer Olympics	Men's team	3rd	Source:

He won the Finnish national championship in team gymnastics as a member of Ylioppilasvoimistelijat in 1909.

He was also selected to Finland's 1912 Olympic gymnastics team, but dropped out due to an injury.

== Later sporting career ==
He won the Finnish figure skating championship in pair skating five times:

- pair Olga Saario: 1924, 1926 and 1927
- pair daughter Hilkka Linna: 1938 and 1939

=== Other ===
He was a founding member of the club Helsingin Luistelijat, and its chairman in 1929–1947.

He was the chairman of the Finnish Skating Association, the predecessor of the Finnish Figure Skating Association, in 1931–1946.

He was a board member of the Finnish Olympic Committee in 1934–1937.

== Personal life ==
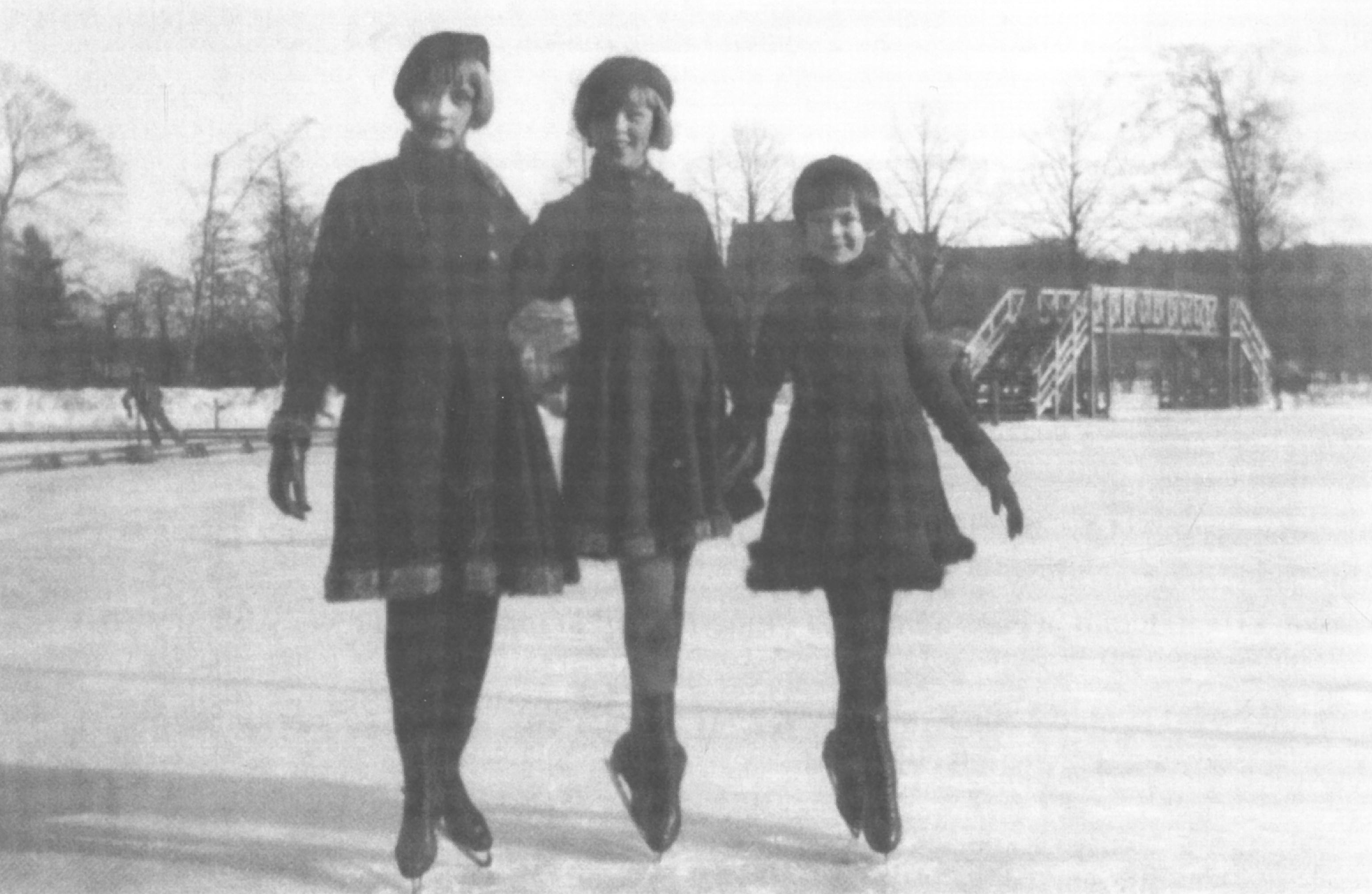
Daughters Hilkka, Riitta and Kirsti. Each won a Finnish championship in figure skating.

Politically, Linna was a Fennoman.

Successful athletic family members:

- Daughter Hilkka Linna (1919–1956) won two Finnish pair skating championships with him.
  - Her granddaughter Liisa Kiuru (1981–) won a junior Finnish and Nordic championship in synchronized skating.
- Daughter Riitta Linna (1922–2016) won a Finnish figure skating championship.
- Daughter Kirsti Linna (1926–) won five Finnish figure skating championships.
