= Mila Kajas =

Finnish figure skater

- Mila Kajas in 2000

Personal information
- Full name: Mila Johanna Kajas
- Other names: Mila Kajas-Virtanen
- Born: 30 January 1972 (age 54) Lahti, Finland
- Height: 1.62 m (5 ft 4 in)

Figure skating career
- Country: Finland
- Skating club: Lahden Taitoluistelijat
- Retired: 1996

Mila Johanna Kajas (born 30 January 1972) is a Finnish former competitive figure skater. She won seven international medals, including silver at the 1993 Grand Prix International de Paris, and four Finnish national titles. Her best ISU Championship results were 11th at the 1994 Worlds in Chiba, Japan, and 10th at the 1996 Europeans in Sofia, Bulgaria. She placed 12th at the 1994 Winter Olympics in Lillehammer.

She married Jarkko Virtanen in 1997 and gave birth to a daughter, Ilona, in January 2004 and Ines, in August 2006

== Results ==
International
Event	89–90	90–91	91–92	92–93	93–94	94–95	95–96
Winter Olympics					12th		
World Champ.		29th	34th	18th	11th	27th	
European Champ.			21st		17th		10th
Internat. de Paris					2nd		
NHK Trophy						6th	
Piruetten				2nd	9th		
St. Gervais					3rd		
Nordics	3rd	2nd	2nd			2nd	
National
Finnish Champ.		1st	1st	1st			1st
