= Ragnar Wikström =

Finnish figure skater

Personal information
- Born: 22 January 1940 Kokkola, Finland
- Died: 23 July 2007 (aged 67)
- Home town: Helsinki, Finland

Figure skating career
- Country: Finland
- Retired: 1970

Ragnar Wikström (22 January 1940 – 23 July 2007) was a Finnish figure skater. As a singles skater, he was a two-time Nordic champion (1963–64) and a nine-time Finnish national champion (1957–58, 1960–64, 1967, 1969), representing HSK. Wikström also competed in pair skating, becoming the 1962 national pairs champion with Eeva Sjögren.

Born in Kokkola, where his family had evacuated due to World War II, Wikström lived most of his life in Helsinki. He studied at the Helsinki University of Technology, graduating with an engineer's degree in 1964, and became a member of the Finnish Geotechnical Society. He had two children with his wife and was related to Walter Jakobsson, the 1920 Olympic pair skating champion, on his mother's side. Wikström died in July 2007 at age 67.

== Competitive highlights ==
=== Single skating ===
International
Event	1957	1958	1959	1960	1961	1962	1963	1964	1965	1966	1967	1968	1969	1970
European Champ.					15th	21st							23rd	
Nordics		3rd	3rd	2nd	2nd	2nd	1st	1st				3rd		3rd
National
Finnish Champ.	1st	1st		1st	1st	1st	1st	1st			1st		1st	

=== Pair skating with Sjögren ===
National
Event	1962
Finnish Championships	1st
