= Anni Järvenpää =

Finnish figure skater (born 2000)

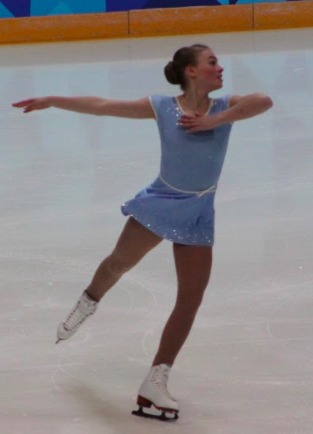

Personal information
- Born: 2 January 2000 (age 26) Tampere, Finland
- Home town: Tampere
- Height: 1.61 m (5 ft 3 1/2 in)

Figure skating career
- Country: Finland
- Coach: Maaret Siromaa, Susanna Haarala
- Skating club: Tappara SC
- Began skating: 2006

Anni Järvenpää (born 2 January 2000 in Tampere) is a Finnish figure skater. She is the 2016 Finnish senior national champion, and the 2015 Nordics junior silver medalist. She represented Finland at the 2016 Winter Youth Olympics in Lillehammer, Norway, where she placed 13th.

== Programs ==
Season	Short program	Free skating
2015–2016	The Umbrellas of Cherbourg by Michel Legrand	Triangle Tango (from Cirque du Soleil)
2014–2015	Chocolat by Rachel Portman	Triangle Tango (from Cirque du Soleil)

== Results ==
CS: Challenger Series; JGP: Junior Grand Prix

International
Event	2014–15	2015–16
CS Finlandia		11th
CS Golden Spin		11th
International: Junior
Youth Olympics		13th
JGP Spain		10th
JGP U.S.		7th
Nordics	2nd J.	
NRW Trophy	2nd J	
Tallinn Trophy	1st J	
National
Finnish Champ.	2nd J.	1st
Levels: J. = Junior
