= Ari-Pekka Nurmenkari =

Finnish figure skater

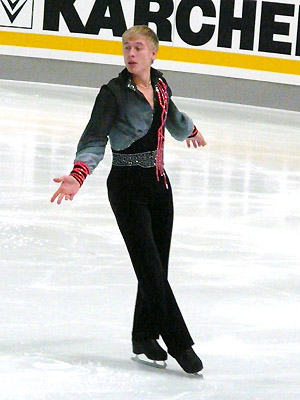
- Nurmenkari in 2007

Personal information
- Full name: Ari-Pekka Nurmenkari
- Born: 8 July 1983 (age 43) Helsinki, Finland
- Height: 1.80 m (5 ft 11 in)

Figure skating career
- Country: Finland
- Coach: Svetlana Kriukova
- Skating club: Tikkurilan FSC

Ari-Pekka Nurmenkari (born 8 July 1983) is a Finnish former competitive figure skater. He is a seven-time (2003–2007, 2009, 2010) Finnish national champion and has represented Finland at the World Figure Skating Championships. He is the 2008 & 2009 Nordic champion.

Nurmenkari withdrew from the 2012 European Championships due to an ankle injury.

== Personal life ==
Nurmenkari married former professional tennis player, Annina Ahti, on 9 August 2008. They have a son, Axel, who was born in August 2009.

== Programs ==
Season	Short program	Free skating
2011–2012	I Love the Way You Lie by Sunny Choi	Corteo (Cirque du Soleil) by Philippe Le Duc, Maria Bonzanigo; Le Cheik Blanc; La pasarella di otto e mezzo by Nino Rota
2009–2010	Sarabande by G. F. Haendel performed by Maksim Mrvica	The Fall (from "Dark Passion Play") by Nightwish
2008–2009	Have You Ever Really Loved a Woman by Bryan Adams	The Fall (from "Dark Passion Play") by Nightwish
2006–2007	Classical Marakesh	Chaplin medley
2005–2006	Sing, Sing, Sing by Louis Prima; Moonlight Serenade	Pagliacci by Ruggero Leoncavallo
2004–2005	Passion for Tango "Buenos Aires" by Carlos Garden, Julián Plaza performed by Sexteto Mayor	Once Upon a Time in Mexico by M. Rodriguez
2003–2004	Passion for Tango "Buenos Aires" by Carlos Garden, Julián Plaza performed by Sexteto Mayor	Cyrano de Bergerac by Jean-Claude Petit performed by The Paris Opera Orchestra
2002–2003	Shark by Piazzola and Nicholson	Cyrano de Bergerac by Jean-Claude Petit performed by The Paris Opera Orchestra
2001–2002	The Song of the Volga Boatmen	Romeo and Juliet by Sergei Prokofiev performed by the British Royal Orchestra
2000–2001	Yesterday by The Beatles	Romeo and Juliet by Sergei Prokofiev performed by the British Royal Orchestra

== Competitive highlights ==
GP: Grand Prix; JGP: Junior Grand Prix

International
Event	97–98	98–99	99–00	00–01	01–02	02–03	03–04	04–05	05–06	06–07	07–08	08–09	09–10	10–11	11–12
Olympics													30th		
Worlds						28th	26th	28th	29th	25th		27th	24th		31st
Europeans						27th	22nd	24th	23rd	23rd		14th	22nd		WD
GP Cup of Russia													11th		
Coupe de Nice													12th		
Crystal Skate						4th									
Finlandia					6th	7th	9th	12th		7th	7th	6th	11th	10th	16th
Golden Spin								8th	15th	7th	15th	5th			
Karl Schäfer									12th						
Nebelhorn							9th	14th	19th	12th	16th		14th		15th
Nordics					3rd			3rd	3rd	3rd	1st	1st		4th	
International: Junior
Junior Worlds				26th	12th										
JGP Final					7th										
JGP Japan					2nd										
JGP Sweden					3rd										
JGP Ukraine				17th											
JGP USA						8th									
Golden Bear			2nd												
Nordics	6th	7th		3rd											
Piruetten		7th													
Triglav Trophy	16th														
National
Finnish Champ.		1st J	1st J	1st J		1st	1st	1st	1st	1st	2nd	1st	1st	3rd	1st
J = Junior level; WD = Withdrew
