= Jessica Huot =

Finnish ice dancer (born 1983)

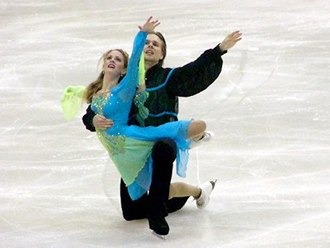
- Huot and Valkama in 2003.

Personal information
- Born: March 30, 1983 (age 43) Holyoke, Massachusetts
- Height: 1.65 m (5 ft 5 in)

Figure skating career
- Country: Finland
- Skating club: HSK Helsinki
- Retired: 2004

Jessica Huot (born March 30, 1983, in Holyoke, Massachusetts) is a former competitive ice dancer for Finland. She teamed up with Juha Valkama in 1999. They are the 2002–04 Finnish national champions. Their highest placement at an ISU Championship was 18th at the 2004 Europeans in Budapest, Hungary.

Huot studied at the Massachusetts Institute of Technology.

Her brother Jonathan Huot is the chief financial officer of American Seafood Partners.

== Programs ==
With Valkama

Season	Original dance	Free dance
2003–04	Shout and Feel It (from Swing Kids) by C. Basie; This Business of Love (from The Mask); Shout and Feel It (from Swing Kids) by C. Basie; Since I've Been Loving You by Jones; Rip It Up by Little Richard	Toccata and Fugue in D minor by Johann Sebastian Bach performed by Vanessa-Mae; Kismet by Gay-Yee Westerhoff performed by Bond; Art of War performed by Vanessa-Mae
2002–03	Galop from Moskva Cheriomushki by Dmitri Shostakovich The Residentie Orchestra The Hague; Waltz 2, Jazz Suite No. 2 by Dmitri Shostakovich; Galop from Moskva Cheriomushki by Dmitri Shostakovich The Residentie Orchestra The Hague	Fantaisie-Impromptu by Frédéric Chopin
2001–02	Scott & Fran's Paso Doble (from Strictly Ballroom) by David Hirschfelder; Habanera (from Carmen) by Georges Bizet; Scott & Fran's Paso Doble (from Strictly Ballroom) by David Hirschfelder	Fantaisie-Impromptu by Frédéric Chopin
2000–01	The Pink Panther Theme by Henry Mancini; Sing, Sing, Sing	Duel of the Fates (from Star Wars) by John Williams Royal Scottish National Orchestra; Bagdad (from The 13th Warrior) by Jerry Goldsmith

== Results ==
GP: Grand Prix; JGP: Junior Grand Prix

With Valkama

International
Event	99–00	00–01	01–02	02–03	03–04
Worlds			26th	21st	28th
Europeans			21st	20th	18th
GP Cup of Russia			12th		
GP NHK Trophy					12th
Finlandia Trophy			5th		7th
International: Junior
Junior Worlds	27th	20th			
JGP China		7th			
JGP Mexico		6th			
JGP Sweden	16th				
National
Finnish Champ.	1st J	1st J	1st	1st	1st
J = Junior level
