= Matias Lindfors (figure skater) =

Finnish figure skater (born 2007)

- Lindfors at the 2026 Nordics Open

Personal information
- Born: March 19, 2007 (age 19) Helsinki, Finland
- Home town: Laukaa, Finland
- Height: 1.75 m (5 ft 9 in)

Figure skating career
- Country: Finland
- Discipline: Men's singles
- Coach: Alina Mayer-Virtanen
- Skating club: Peurunka Skating Academy Laukaa
- Began skating: 2010

Matias Lindfors (born March 19, 2007) is a Finnish competitive figure skater. He is the 2026 Finnish national champion, the 2022 Finnish junior national champion, and the 2026 Nordics Open junior champion. He has represented Finland at the European Figure Skating Championships and three World Junior Figure Skating Championships.

== Personal life ==
Lindfors was born on March 19, 2007, in Helsinki, Finland, and is based in Laukaa. He has three older sisters, Viveca Lindfors, Monica Lindfors, and Fanny Lindfors, all of whom have competed in figure skating. Lindfors is also an actor and he has acted in several movies and TV series, including Munkkivuori (2022).

== Career ==
=== Early career ===
Lindfors began figure skating in 2010. He won the Finnish novice boys' championship in 2019 and took silver in the advanced novice category at the 2020 Nordics Open. He trained with Espoon Jäätaiturit earlier in his career and subsequently joined Peurunka Skating Academy Laukaa.

=== 2021–22 season ===
Lindfors won the junior men's title at the 2022 Finnish national championships in December 2021. He went on to finish fourteenth at the 2022 Bavarian Open, before winning a bronze medal at the Nordics Open in Denmark. In February, he took silver at the Jégvirág Cup in Miskolc, Hungary, scoring 149.64 points.

=== 2022–23 season ===
Lindfors made his ISU Junior Grand Prix debut at the 2022 JGP in Egna, Italy, where he finished twelfth. He also placed fifth at the NRW Trophy in Germany and made his senior-level national championships debut, winning the bronze medal at the 2023 Finnish Championships in December 2022. In January 2023, Lindfors finished sixth at the European Youth Olympic Winter Festival in Italy. He subsequently took silver at the Nordics Open in Reykjavík, Iceland, and won the junior event at the Tallink Hotels Cup in Tallinn, Estonia.

=== 2023–24 season ===
Lindfors competed at two Junior Grand Prix events, finishing tenth at the JGP Austria in Linz and fifteenth at the JGP Japan in Osaka. At the 2024 Finnish national championships, held in December 2023, he placed fourth in the senior men's competition. In early 2024, he finished fifth at the Volvo Open Cup and won silver at the Nordics Open in Borås, Sweden, after placing first in the free skate. He made his debut at the 2024 World Junior Figure Skating Championships in Taipei, placing twenty-second overall with 180.80 points.

=== 2024–25 season ===
Lindfors with Alina Mayer-Virtanen at the 2025 World Junior Figure Skating Championships.

Lindfors started the season on the Junior Grand Prix circuit, finishing fifteenth at JGP Czech Republic and eighth at JGP Poland. At the JGP Czech Republic, Jason Brown, who gave a live commentary on ISU Official Youtube, spoke very highly of Lindfors' choreography and presentation at his free skating. He subsequently competed in senior international events, placing sixth at the Volvo Open Cup in Riga and seventeenth at the Tallinn Trophy, an event on the ISU Challenger Series. He concluded his season at the 2025 World Junior Figure Skating Championships in Debrecen, Hungary, where he finished twenty-fifth in the short program with a score of 59.27 points and did not qualify for the free skate.

=== 2025–26 season ===
Lindfors at the 2026 Nordic Figure Skating Championships.

Lindfors returned to the Junior Grand Prix series, finishing eighth at the 2025 JGP Solidarity Cup in Gdańsk, Poland, and seventh at the JGP Abu Dhabi in the United Arab Emirates. He later placed seventh in the junior event at the Tallinn Trophy and thirteenth at the senior Golden Spin of Zagreb, part of the ISU Challenger Series.In December 2025, he won his first Finnish senior national title at the 2026 Finnish Championships in Lahti, scoring 203.10 points. In January 2026, Lindfors made his debut at the 2026 European Figure Skating Championships in Sheffield, finishing twenty-third overall. Later that month, he won the junior title at the Nordics Open in Copenhagen with a total score of 200.87 points. Lindfors ended the season at the 2026 World Junior Figure Skating Championships in Tallinn, finishing eighteenth overall with a score of 192.90 points. He placed sixteenth in the short program and seventeenth in the free skate.

=== 2026–27 season ===
Lindfors opened his international season at the 2026 CS Budapest Trophy in Budapest, Hungary, finishing ninth in the senior men's event. He scored 77.51 points in the short program and 125.99 in the free skate for a combined score of 203.50, setting new ISU-recognized personal bests in the short program and overall score.

== Competitive highlights ==
- GP – Event of the ISU Grand Prix Series
- CS – Event of the ISU Challenger Series
- JGP – Event of the ISU Junior Grand Prix series
- DNQ – Did not qualify for free skating

Competition placements at senior level
Season	2022–23	2023–24	2024–25	2025–26	2026–27
European Championships				23rd	
Finnish Championships	3rd	4th		1st	
GP Finlandia Trophy					TBD
CS Budapest Trophy					9th
CS Golden Spin of Zagreb				13th	
CS Tallinn Trophy			17th		
Volvo Open Cup			6th		5th

Competition placements at junior level
Season	2021–22	2022–23	2023–24	2024–25	2025–26
World Junior Championships			22nd	25th	18th
Finnish Junior Championships	1st				
JGP Austria			10th		
JGP Italy		12th			
JGP Japan			15th		
JGP Poland				8th	8th
JGP Czech Republic				15th	
JGP Abu Dhabi					7th
European Youth Olympic Festival		6th			
Bavarian Open	14th				
Jégvirág Cup	2nd				
NRW Trophy		5th			
Nordics Open	3rd	2nd	2nd		1st
Tallink Hotels Cup		1st			
Tallinn Trophy					7th
Volvo Open Cup			5th		

== Detailed results ==
ISU personal best scores in the +5/-5 GOE System
Segment	Type	Score	Event
Total	TSS	203.50	2026 Budapest Trophy
Short program	TSS	77.51	2026 Budapest Trophy
Short program	TES	39.51	2026 Budapest Trophy
Short program	PCS	38.00	2026 Budapest Trophy
Free skating	TSS	126.20	2026 World Junior Championships
Free skating	TES	56.63	2023 JGP Austria
Free skating	PCS	72.93	2026 Budapest Trophy

=== Senior level ===
Results in the 2022–23 season
Date	Event	SP		FS		Total	
Date	Event	P	Score	P	Score	P	Score
Dec 16–18, 2022	(Finland) 2023 Finnish Championships	4	54.49	2	120.30	3	174.79

Results in the 2023–24 season
Date	Event	SP		FS		Total	
Date	Event	P	Score	P	Score	P	Score
Dec 15–17, 2023	(Finland) 2024 Finnish Championships	6	54.48	4	115.87	4	170.35

Results in the 2024–25 season
Date	Event	SP		FS		Total	
Date	Event	P	Score	P	Score	P	Score
Oct 31 – Nov 3, 2024	(Latvia) 2024 Volvo Open Cup	2	68.66	9	115.45	6	184.11
Nov 11–17, 2024	(Estonia) CS 2024 Tallinn Trophy	19	54.62	16	118.85	17	173.47

Results in the 2025–26 season
Date	Event	SP		FS		Total	
Date	Event	P	Score	P	Score	P	Score
Dec 3–6, 2025	(Croatia) CS 2025 Golden Spin of Zagreb	13	70.85	14	123.29	13	194.14
Dec 12–14, 2025	(Finland) 2026 Finnish Championships	2	66.28	1	136.82	1	203.10
Jan 13–18, 2026	(United Kingdom) 2026 European Championships	18	67.80	24	115.83	23	183.63

Results in the 2026–27 season
Date	Event	SP		FS		Total	
Date	Event	P	Score	P	Score	P	Score
Oct 16–18, 2026	(Hungary) CS 2026 Budapest Trophy	6	77.51	12	125.99	9	203.50
Nov 4–8, 2026	(Latvia) 2026 Volvo Open Cup	4	68.93	5	118.13	5	187.05
Nov 20–21, 2026	(Finland) GP 2026 Finlandia Trophy	8	76.74				

=== Junior level ===
Results in the 2025–26 season
Date	Event	SP		FS		Total	
Date	Event	P	Score	P	Score	P	Score
Mar 3–8, 2026	(Estonia) 2026 World Junior Championships	16	66.70	17	126.20	18	192.90
Jan 29 – Feb 1, 2026	(Denmark) 2026 Nordics Open	3	63.81	1	137.06	1	200.87
Nov 25–30, 2025	(Estonia) 2025 Tallinn Trophy	13	51.00	8	107.45	7	158.45
Oct 8–11, 2025	(United Arab Emirates) JGP 2025 JGP Abu Dhabi	7	68.00	7	124.55	7	192.55
Oct 1–4, 2025	JGP 2025 JGP Poland	8	65.92	9	122.60	8	188.52

Results in the 2024–25 season
Date	Event	SP		FS		Total	
Date	Event	P	Score	P	Score	P	Score
Feb 25 – Mar 2, 2025	(Hungary) 2025 World Junior Championships	25	59.27	–	–	25	59.27
Sep 25–28, 2024	JGP 2024 JGP Poland	12	56.65	7	114.97	8	171.62
Sep 4–7, 2024	JGP 2024 JGP Czech Republic	11	59.48	15	97.16	15	156.64

Results in the 2023–24 season
Date	Event	SP		FS		Total	
Date	Event	P	Score	P	Score	P	Score
Feb 26 – Mar 3, 2024	(Chinese Taipei) 2024 World Junior Championships	14	66.06	23	114.74	22	180.80
Feb 1–4, 2024	(Sweden) 2024 Nordics Open	4	57.79	1	123.26	2	181.05
Jan 18–21, 2024	(Latvia) 2024 Volvo Open Cup	7	60.33	5	114.80	5	175.13
Sep 14–16, 2023	JGP 2023 JGP Japan	11	58.24	16	104.31	15	162.55
Aug 30 – Sep 2, 2023	JGP 2023 JGP Austria	11	55.16	9	119.36	10	174.52

Results in the 2022–23 season
Date	Event	SP		FS		Total	
Date	Event	P	Score	P	Score	P	Score
Feb 16–19, 2023	(Estonia) 2023 Tallink Hotels Cup	1	61.27	1	106.81	1	168.08
Feb 2–5, 2023	(Iceland) 2023 Nordics Open	2	59.99	2	110.82	2	170.81
Jan 23–27, 2023	(Italy) 2023 European Youth Olympic Winter Festival	6	61.33	5	115.77	6	177.10
Nov 24–27, 2022	(Germany) 2022 NRW Trophy	3	53.64	5	94.53	5	148.17
Oct 12–15, 2022	JGP 2022 JGP Italy	12	58.46	12	109.69	12	168.15

Results in the 2021–22 season
Date	Event	SP		FS		Total	
Date	Event	P	Score	P	Score	P	Score
Feb 11–13, 2022	(Hungary) 2022 Jégvirág Cup	2	53.41	2	96.23	2	149.64
Jan 27–30, 2022	(Denmark) 2022 Nordics Open	3	61.37	3	100.01	3	161.38
Jan 18–23, 2022	(Germany) 2022 Bavarian Open	13	48.94	16	72.90	14	121.84
Dec 17–18, 2021	(Finland) 2022 Finnish Championships (junior)	1	50.72	1	95.23	1	145.95
