= Henna Lindholm =

Finnish ice dancer

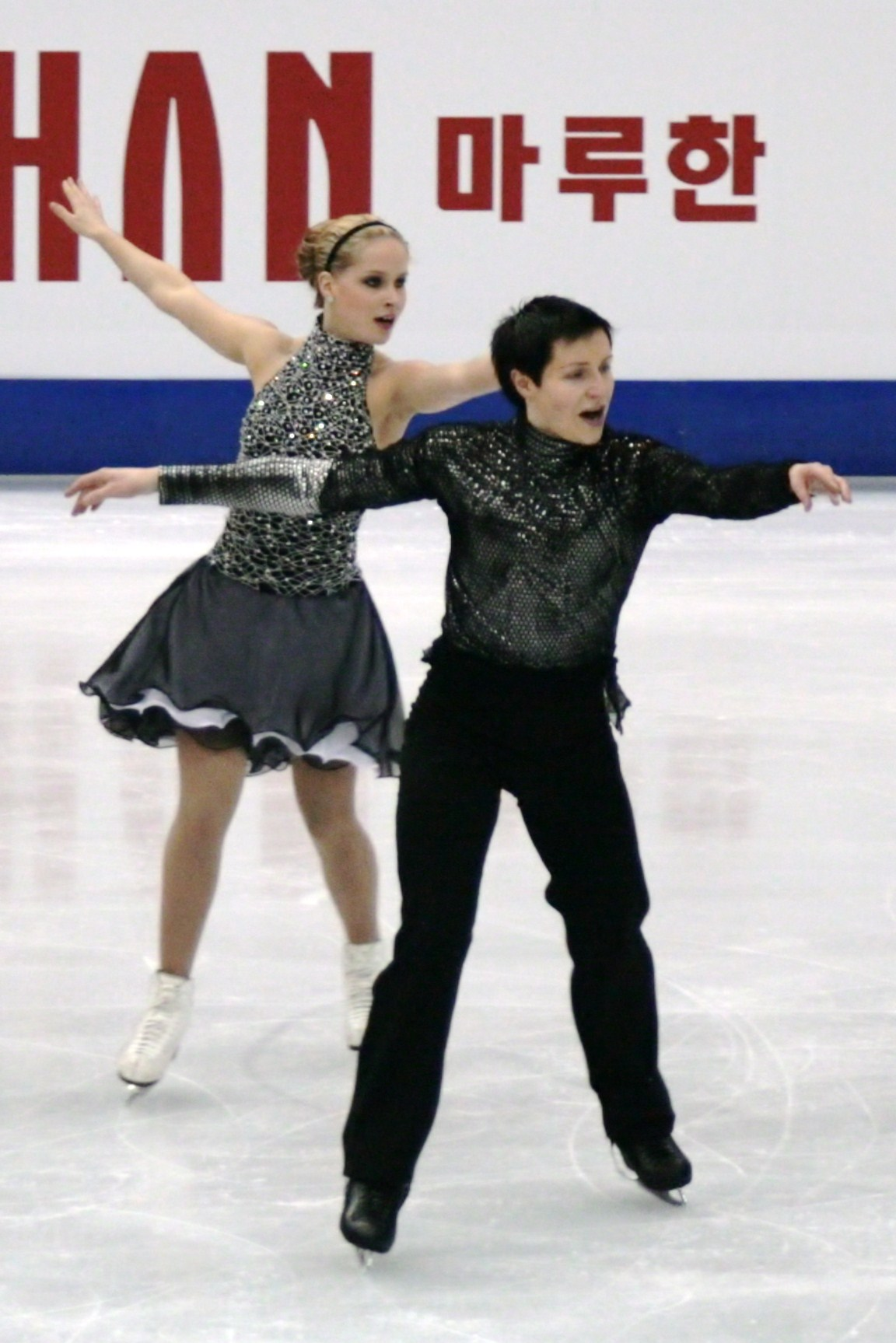
- Lindholm/Kanervo in 2012

Personal information
- Born: 4 May 1989 (age 37) Helsinki, Finland
- Home town: Helsinki, Finland
- Height: 1.63 m (5 ft 4 in)

Figure skating career
- Country: Finland
- Partner: Ossi Kanervo
- Coach: Maurizio Margaglio
- Skating club: Helsingfors SC
- Began skating: 1993
- Retired: May 13, 2015

Henna Lindholm (born 4 May 1989) is a Finnish former ice dancer. With partner Ossi Kanervo, she is the 2012 Nordic champion, the 2014 Bavarian Open bronze medalist, and a three-time Finnish national champion.

Lindholm was a single skater until the age of 18, when she began training with Kanervo in ice dancing. They qualified for the free dance at the 2014 European Championships and finished 20th. They retired from competitive skating on May 13, 2015.

== Programs ==
(with Kanervo)

| Season | Short dance | Free dance |
|---|---|---|
| 2014–2015 | Paso Doble: La Gracia de Dios; Spanish Walz: Corrida de Toros | La Bohème; Emmenez-moi; For Me Formidable by Charles Aznavour |
| 2013–2014 | Quickstep: It Don't Mean a Thing by Duke Ellington; Slow foxtrot: I've Got You Under My Skin by Frank Sinatra; Quickstep: It Don't Mean a Thing | Cinema Paradiso by Ennio Morricone: Cinema Paradiso; Runaway Search and Return; Toto and Alfredo; Love Theme |
| 2012–2013 | Angry Birds (main theme); Jeux d'enfants (from Cirque du Soleil) | Evita by Andrew Lloyd Webber: On This Night of a Thousand Stars; Buenos Aires; You Must Love Me; Don't Cry For Me Argentina |
| 2011–2012 | Lo Que Yo Más Quiero; Toma Toma | Unchained Melody; Prints; Senza Catene |
| | Original dance | |
| 2009–2010 | Hungarian folk music | Spente le Stelle by Emma Shapplin |

== Competitive highlights ==
(with Kanervo)

CS: Challenger Series (began in the 2014–15 season)

International
| Event | 2008–09 | 2009–10 | 2010–11 | 2011–12 | 2012–13 | 2013–14 | 2014–15 |
|---|---|---|---|---|---|---|---|
| Worlds | | | | 28th | | 26th | |
| Europeans | | | 14th PR | 13th PR | | 20th | |
| CS Finlandia | | 10th | 10th | 9th | 8th | 5th | 4th |
| Bavarian Open | | | | 9th | 10th | 3rd | |
| Cup of Nice | | 2nd | | | | | |
| Golden Spin | | | 13th | | | | |
| Ice Challenge | | | 13th | | | 7th | 4th |
| Nebelhorn | | 16th | | 14th | | 13th | |
| Nordics | | | | 1st | | | |
| NRW Trophy | | | 11th | 12th | 10th | | |
| Pavel Roman | | | | 7th | 9th | | |
| Volvo Open | | | | | 6th | | |
National
| Finnish Champ. | 2nd | 2nd | 1st | 1st | 2nd | 1st | |
PR = Preliminary round
