= Sakari Ilmanen =

Finnish figure skater (1880–1968)

Personal information
- Nationality: Finnish
- Born: 3 November 1880 Loppi, Russian Empire
- Died: 16 February 1968 (aged 87) Helsinki, Finland

Sport
- Sport: Figure skating

Sakari Johannes Ilmanen (3 November 1880 – 16 February 1968) was a Finnish figure skater. He competed in the men's singles event at the 1920 Summer Olympics.
