= Mikko Minkkinen =

Finnish figure skater

Personal information
- Born: 23 May 1984 (age 42) Vantaa, Finland
- Height: 1.78 m (5 ft 10 in)

Figure skating career
- Country: Finland
- Skating club: Helsinki Skating Club

Mikko Minkkinen (born 23 May 1984 in Vantaa) is a Finnish former competitive figure skater. He is the 2008 Finnish national champion and the 2002 Junior national champion. He is the 2002 Nordic junior silver medalist and 2008 senior silver medalist.

== Programs ==
Season	Short program	Free skating
2009–2010	Adagietto from Symphony No. 5 by Gustav Mahler	Adagio for Strings by Samuel Barber
2008–2009	Death in Venice by Gustav Mahler	Enjoy the Silence; Memphisto; Sibeling by Martin Gore performed by Depeche Mode
2007–2008	Theme from Roseanne by William Garrett Walden	Enjoy the Silence; Sibeling by Martin Gore performed by Depeche Mode
2003–2004	Violin Concerto by Jean Sibelius	Basic Instinct by Jerry Goldsmith London Symphony Orchestra; Stockholm-Helsinki by Fintelligens
2002–2003	Violin Concerto by Jean Sibelius	You're Under Arrest; Time After Time by Miles Davis
2001–2002	The Out-of-Towners by Marc Shaiman	You're Under Arrest by Miles Davis

== Results ==
Results
International
Event	1999–00	2000–01	2001–02	2002–03	2003–04	2005–06	2007–08	2008–09	2009–10
Worlds							31st		
Europeans							28th		
Crystal Skate					3rd				
Finlandia					11th		12th	14th	19th
Merano Cup						6th			
Nebelhorn					15th			20th	
Nordics		2nd J.	2nd J.			5th	2nd		3rd
NRW Trophy									12th
Ondrej Nepela									15th
Triglav Trophy				2nd					
International: Junior
Junior Worlds				15th					
JGP China		10th							
JGP France		11th							
JGP Japan			5th						
JGP Netherlands			16th						
Golden Bear	4th J.								
National
Finnish Champ.	2nd J.	3rd J.	1st J.	2nd	3rd	3rd	1st		2nd
JGP = Junior Grand Prix; J. = Junior level
