= Ossi Kanervo =

Finnish ice dancer

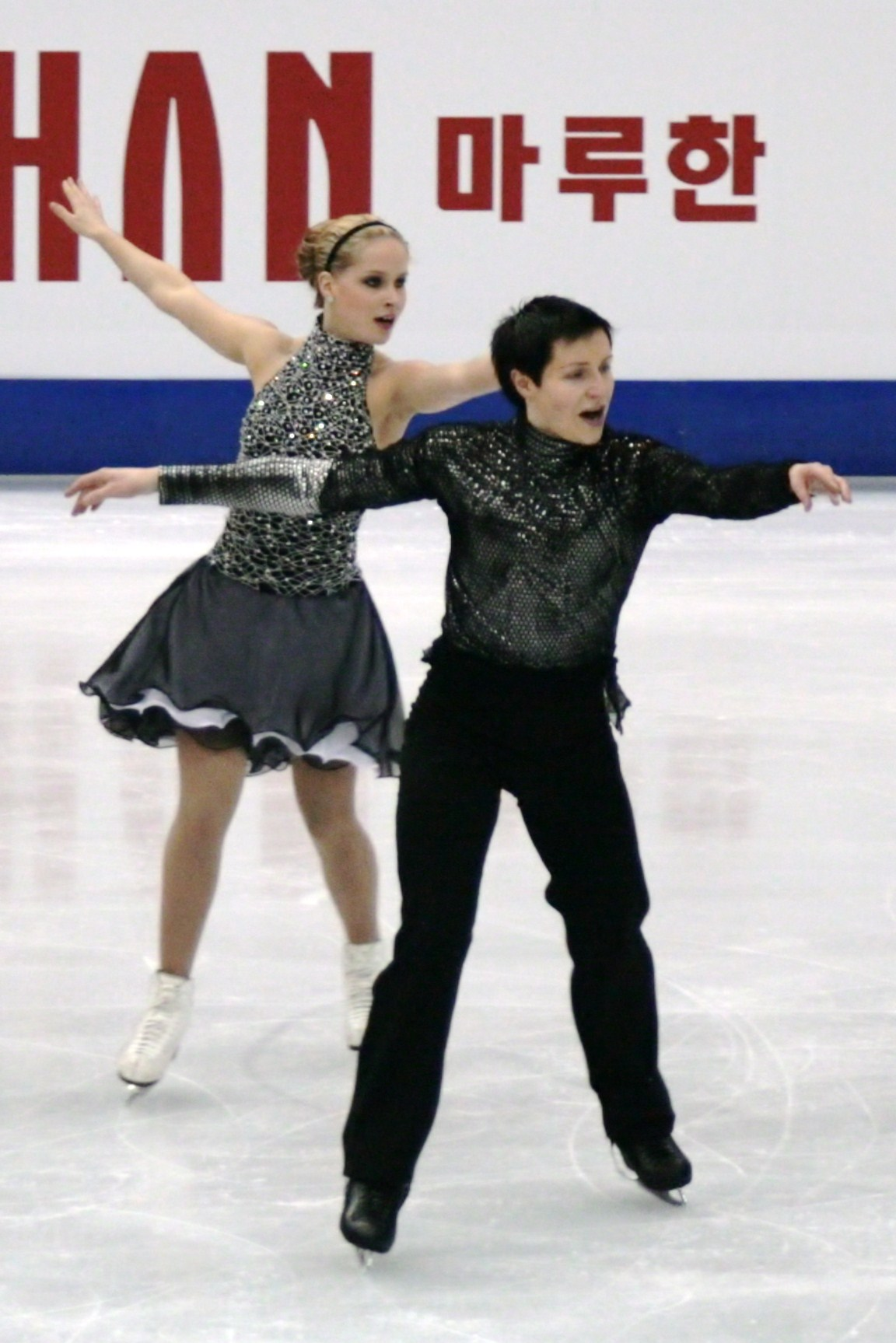
- Lindholm/Kanervo in 2012

Personal information
- Born: 23 November 1987 (age 38) Oulu, Finland
- Home town: Järvenpää, Finland
- Height: 1.73 m (5 ft 8 in)

Figure skating career
- Country: Finland
- Partner: Henna Lindholm
- Coach: Maurizio Margaglio
- Skating club: Helsinki SC
- Began skating: 1993
- Retired: May 13, 2015

Ossi Kanervo (born 23 November 1987) is a Finnish ice dancer. With partner Henna Lindholm, he is the 2012 Nordic champion, the 2014 Bavarian Open bronze medalist, and a three-time Finnish national champion.

== Career ==
Kanervo trained only in single skating until the age of 16–17, when he began learning ice dancing once a week under Susanna Rahkamo. Following a partnership with Janna Hujanen, he teamed up with Henna Lindholm around 2008. He also continued to compete in single skating until the spring of 2009. Lindholm/Kanervo qualified for the free dance at the 2014 European Championships and finished 20th. They retired from competitive skating on May 13, 2015.

== Programs ==
(with Lindholm)

Season	Short dance	Free dance
2014–2015	Paso Doble: La Gracia de Dios; Spanish Waltz: Corrida de Toros	La Bohème; Emmenez-moi; For Me Formidable by Charles Aznavour
2013–2014	Quickstep: It Don't Mean a Thing by Duke Ellington; Slow foxtrot: I've Got You Under My Skin by Frank Sinatra; Quickstep: It Don't Mean a Thing	Cinema Paradiso by Ennio Morricone: Cinema Paradiso; Runaway Search and Return; Toto and Alfredo; Love Theme
2012–2013	Angry Birds (main theme); Jeux d'enfants (from Cirque du Soleil)	Evita by Andrew Lloyd Webber: On This Night of a Thousand Stars; Buenos Aires; You Must Love Me; Don't Cry For Me Argentina
2011–2012	Lo Que Yo Más Quiero; Toma Toma	Unchained Melody; Prints; Senza Catene
	Original dance	
2009–2010	Hungarian folk music	Spente le Stelle by Emma Shapplin

== Competitive highlights ==
CS: Challenger Series (began in the 2014–15 season)

=== With Lindholm ===
International
Event	2008–09	2009–10	2010–11	2011–12	2012–13	2013–14	2014–15
Worlds				28th		26th	
Europeans			14th PR	13th PR		20th	
CS Finlandia		10th	10th	9th	8th	5th	4th
Bavarian Open				9th	10th	3rd	
Cup of Nice		2nd					
Golden Spin			13th				
Ice Challenge			13th			7th	4th
Nebelhorn		16th		14th		13th	
Nordics				1st			
NRW Trophy			11th	12th	10th		
Pavel Roman				7th	9th		
Volvo Open					6th		
National
Finnish Champ.	2nd	2nd	1st	1st	2nd	1st	
PR = Preliminary round

=== With Hujanen ===
National
Event	2006–07
Finnish Championships	1st
