= Figure skating at the 1920 Summer Olympics – Men's singles =

Figure skating at the Olympics

Men's singles figure skating at the Games of the VII Olympiad
- Venue: Palais de Glace d'Anvers
- Dates: 25–27 April 1920
- Competitors: 9 from 6 nations

Medalists
1st place, gold medalist(s)		Gillis Grafström	Sweden
2nd place, silver medalist(s)		Andreas Krogh	Norway
3rd place, bronze medalist(s)		Martin Stixrud	Norway

The men's individual skating was an event held as part of the figure skating at the 1920 Summer Olympics. It was the second appearance of the event and the sport, which had previously been held in 1908.

Nine skaters from six nations competed. Gillis Grafström of Sweden captured the first of three consecutive Olympic gold medals in the men's single event in 1920. 1908 gold medalist Ulrich Salchow finished fourth. At age 44, bronze medalist Martin Stixrud is the oldest man to ever win an Olympic medal in an individual winter event.

== Results ==
Rank	Name	Nation	CF	FS	Places
1	Gillis Grafström	Sweden	1	1	7.0
2	Andreas Krogh	Norway	3	3	18.0
3	Martin Stixrud	Norway	4	2	24.5
4	Ulrich Salchow	Sweden	2	5	25.5
5	Sakari Ilmanen	Finland	5	4	30.0
6	Nathaniel Niles	United States	7	6	49.0
7	Basil Williams	Great Britain	6	9	49.5
8	Alfred Mégroz	Switzerland	8	7	52.5
9	Kenneth Beaumont	Great Britain	9	8	59.0

Referee:

- (Sweden) Victor Lundquist

Judges:

- (Sweden) August Anderberg
- (France) Louis Magnus
- (Belgium) Max Orban
- (Norway) Knut Ørn Meinich
- (United Kingdom) Herbert Yglesias
- (Belgium) Edourd Delpy
- (Finland) Walter Jakobsson

== Sources ==
- Belgium Olympic Committee (1957). Olympic Games Antwerp 1920: Official Report (in French).
- Wudarski, Pawel (1999). "Wyniki Igrzysk Olimpijskich" (in Polish). Archived from the original on 19 June 2007.
