= Norwegian Figure Skating Championships =

Recurring figure skating competition

- Status: Active
- Genre: National championships
- Frequency: Annual
- Country: Norway
- Inaugurated: 1894
- Organizer: Norwegian Skating Association

The Norwegian Figure Skating Championships (Norwegian: Norgesmesterskap i kunstløp) are an annual figure skating competition organized by the Norwegian Skating Association (Norwegian: Norges Skøyteforbund) to crown the national champions of Norway. The first official Norwegian Championships were held in 1894 in Hamar and consisted of events in speed skating and figure skating. Originally, the only figure skating event was for men. An event for pair skating was added in 1906, and for women in 1911. Since 1899, the championships have been interrupted twice: from 1941 to 1945 owing to the German occupation of Norway during World War II, and in 2021 due to the COVID-19 pandemic.

Medals are awarded in men's and women's singles at the senior and junior levels, although each discipline may not be held every year due to a lack of participants. There has not been competition in pair skating in Norway since 1968. Martin Stixrud currently holds the record for winning the most Norwegian Championship titles in men's singles (with ten), while Anne Karin Dehle holds the record in women's singles (with nine), and Alexia Schøien Bryn and Yngvar Bryn hold the record in pair skating (with ten).

== Senior medalists ==
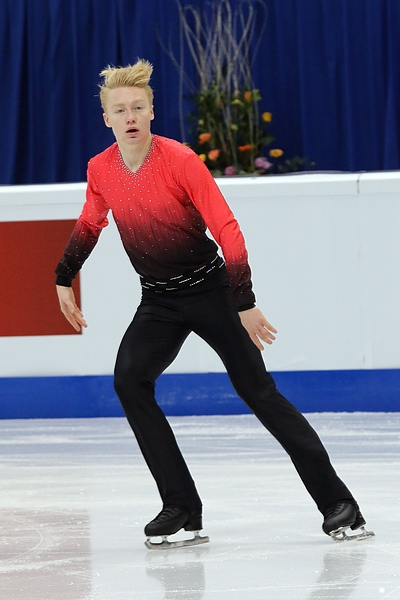
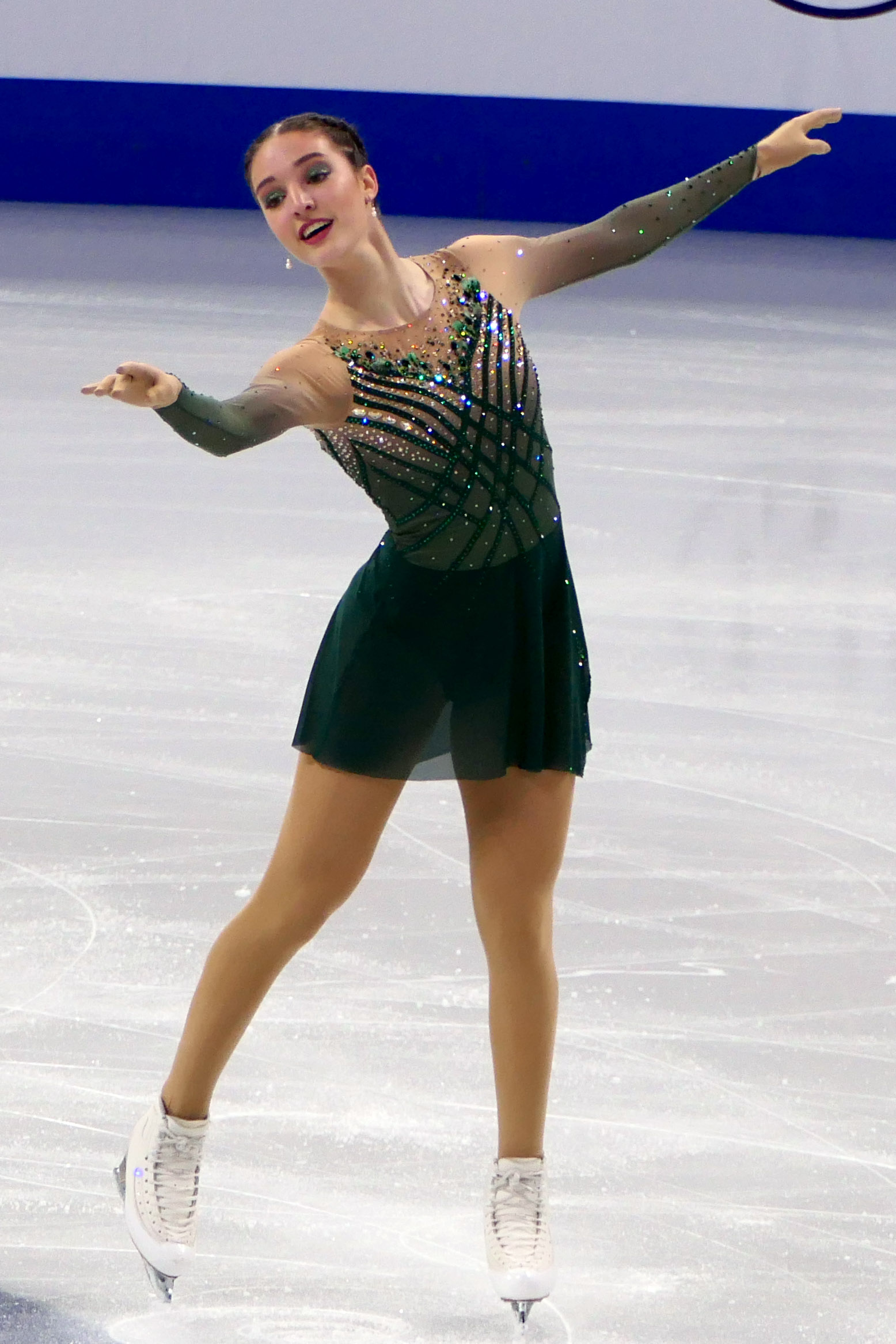
From left to right: Sondre Oddvoll Bøe, four-time Norwegian champion in men's singles; and Mia Risa Gomez, four-time Norwegian champion in women's singles

=== Men's singles ===
Senior men's event medalists
Year	Location	Gold	Silver	Bronze	Ref.
1894	Hamar	Johan Lefstad	Oscar Holthe	Conrad Knudsen	
1895	Trondheim	Johan Lefstad	Conrad Knudsen	Oscar Holthe	
1896	Kristiania	Johan Lefstad	Oscar Holthe	Conrad Knudsen	
1897	Trondheim	Johan Lefstad (Note: Johan Lefstad did not achieve the minimum required score to be named the Norwegian champion.)	No other competitors		
1898	No competition held				
1899	Kristiania	Johan Lefstad	Oscar Holthe	Paul Olsen	
1900	Trondheim	Johan Lefstad	Oscar Holthe	Paul Olsen	
1901	Kristiania	Oscar Holthe	Paul Olsen	Emanuel Johansen	
1902	Hamar	Oscar Holthe	Paul Olsen	Emanuel Johansen	
1903	Drammen	Oscar Holthe	Paul Olsen	Arne Drolsum	
1904	Trondheim	Johan Lefstad	Oscar Holthe	Karl Larsen	
1905	Kristiania	Oscar Holthe	Arne Drolsum	No other competitors	
1906	Trondheim	Oscar Holthe	Johan Lefstad	Martinus Lørdahl	
1907	Hamar	Harry Paulsen	Oscar Holthe	Martinus Lørdahl	
1908	Kristiania	Harry Paulsen	Martin Stixrud	Martinus Lørdahl	
1909	Lillehammer	Harry Paulsen	Martinus Lørdahl	Martin Stixrud	
1910	Trondheim	Harry Paulsen	Martin Stixrud	Andreas Krogh	
1911	Kristiania	Harry Paulsen	Martin Stixrud	Andreas Krogh	
1912	Horten	Andreas Krogh	Martin Stixrud	Martinus Lørdahl	
1913	Kristiania	Martin Stixrud	Andreas Krogh	Albert Stixrud	
1914	Trondheim	Andreas Krogh	Martin Stixrud	Albert Stixrud	
1915	Kristiania	Andreas Krogh	Martin Stixrud	Martinus Lørdahl	
1916	Drammen	Martin Stixrud	Albert Stixrud	Finn Erikssen	
1917	Kristiania	Martin Stixrud	Martinus Lørdahl	Albert Stixrud	
1918	Horten	Martin Stixrud	Albert Stixrud	Andreas Krogh	
1919	Hamar	Martin Stixrud	Albert Stixrud	Josef Jensen	
1920	Trondheim	Martin Stixrud	Finn Erikssen	Albert Stixrud	
1921	Moss	Martin Stixrud	Finn Erikssen	Martinus Lørdahl	
1922	Drammen	Martin Stixrud	Arne Lie	Martinus Lørdahl	
1923	Kristiania	Martin Stixrud	Olaf Olsen	Jens Larsen	
1924	Kongsberg	Martin Stixrud	Arne Lie	Jens Larsen	
1925	Moss	Arne Lie	Jens Larsen	Olaf Olsen	
1926	Tønsberg	Arne Lie	Olaf Olsen	Jens Larsen	
1927	Oslo	Arne Lie	Olaf Olsen	Sigvald Jacobsen	
1928	Sandefjord	Arne Lie	Sigvald Jacobsen	Per Jacobsen	
1929	Lillehammer	Olaf Olsen	Per Jacobsen	No other competitors	
1930	Hamar	Olaf Olsen (Note: Neither of the men's competitors in 1930 achieved the minimum required score to be named the Norwegian champion.)	Per Jacobsen	No other competitors	
1931	Horten	Per Jacobsen	Olaf Olsen	Leif Hovde	
1932	Oslo	Per Jacobsen	No other competitors		
1933	Notodden	No men's competitors			
1934	Drammen	Andreas Krogh (Note: Neither of the men's competitors in 1934 achieved the minimum required score to be named the Norwegian champion.)	Henry Lie	No other competitors	
1935	Brandbu	Andreas Krogh	Henry Lie	No other competitors	
1936	Oslo	Henry Lie	No other competitors		
1937	Gjøvik	No men's competitors			
1938	Oslo	Per Reinertsen	Allan Fjeldheim	No other competitors	
1939	Kongsberg	Per Reinertsen (Note: None of the men's competitors in 1939 achieved the minimum required score to be named the Norwegian champion.)	Allan Fjeldheim	Karsten Johansson	
1940	Hamar	Per Reinertsen	Allan Fjeldheim	No other competitors	
1941–45	No competitions due to World War II				
1946	Oslo	No men's competitors			
1947	Trondheim	Erling Bjerkhoel	No other competitors		
1948–55	No men's competitors				
1956	Hamar	Per Kjølberg	No other competitors		
1957	Larvik	Per Kjølberg	No other competitors		
1958	Notodden	Per Kjølberg	No other competitors		
1959	Trondheim	Per Kjølberg	No other competitors		
1960	Hønefoss	Per Kjølberg	No other competitors		
1961	Sandefjord	Per Kjølberg	No other competitors		
1962	Harstad	Per Kjølberg	No other competitors		
1963–64	No men's competitors				
1965	Arendal	Egil Fjellhaug	No other competitors		
1966	Drammen	Erik Skjold	Erik Grünert	Egil Fjellhaug	
1967	Trondheim	Erik Skjold	No other competitors		
1968	Horten	Erik Skjold	No other competitors		
1969–88	No men's competitors				
1989	Trondheim	Jan Erik Digernes	No other competitors		
1990	Oslo	Jan Erik Digernes	No other competitors		
1991–92	No men's competitors				
1993	Oslo	Jan Erik Digernes	No other competitors		
1994	Fredrikstad	No men's competitors			
1995	Asker	Jan Erik Digernes	No men's competitors		
1996–2005	No men's competitors				
2006	Trondheim	Michael Chrolenko	No other competitors		
2007	Asker	Michael Chrolenko	No other competitors		
2008–13	No men's competitors				
2014	Sarpsborg	Sondre Oddvoll Bøe	No other competitors		
2015	Asker	No men's competitors			
2016	Bergen	Sondre Oddvoll Bøe	No other competitors		
2017–18	No men's competitors				
2019	Hamar	Sondre Oddvoll Bøe	No other competitors		
2020	Asker	Sondre Oddvoll Bøe	No other competitors		
2021	Competition cancelled due to the COVID-19 pandemic				
2022	Oslo	No men's competitors			
2023	Trondheim	Jan William Eraker	No other competitors		
2024	Tromsø	Jan William Eraker	No other competitors		
2025–26	No men's competitors				

=== Women's singles ===
Senior women's event medalists
Year	Location	Gold	Silver	Bronze	Ref.
1911	Kristiania	Margit Johansen	Sofie Guldbrandsen	Astrid Nordsveen	
1912	Horten	Margit Johansen	Sofie Guldbrandsen	Astrid Nordsveen	
1913	Kristiania	Margit Johansen	Astrid Nordsveen	Klara Johansen	
1914	Trondheim	Margit Johansen	Astrid Nordsveen	No other competitors	
1915	Kristiania	Margit Johansen	Astrid Nordsveen	Klara Johansen	
1916	Drammen	Klara Johansen	Astrid Nordsveen	Margot Moe	
1917	Kristiania	Margit Johansen	No other competitors		
1918	Horten	Margit Johansen	No other competitors		
1919	Hamar	Margot Moe	Ingrid Gulbrandsen	No other competitors	
1920	Trondheim	Margot Moe	Ingrid Gulbrandsen	Olga Sethne	
1921	Moss	Margot Moe	Ingrid Gulbrandsen	Ingrid Lørdahl	
1922	Drammen	Margot Moe	No other competitors		
1923	Kristiania	Margot Moe	Ingrid Lørdahl	Hjordis Helseth	
1924	Kongsberg	Ingrid Gulbrandsen	Sonja Henie	Hjordis Helseth	
1925	Moss	Sonja Henie	No other competitors		
1926	Tønsberg	Sonja Henie	Solveig Andersen	Karen Simensen	
1927	Oslo	Sonja Henie	Karen Simensen	No other competitors	
1928	Sandefjord	Sonja Henie	Karen Simensen	Edel Randem	
1929	Lillehammer	Sonja Henie	Edel Randem	Erna Andersen	
1930	Hamar	Edel Randem	Erna Andersen	Nanna Egedius	
1931	Horten	Edel Randem	Erna Andersen	Nanna Egedius	
1932	Oslo	Nanna Egedius	Erna Andersen	Randi Gulliksen	
1933	Notodden	Nanna Egedius	Erna Andersen	Aase Johnsen	
1934	Drammen	Nanna Egedius	Erna Andersen	Randi Gulliksen	
1935	Brandbu	Nanna Egedius	Anne Marie Sæther	Gerd Helland-Bjørnstad	
1936	Oslo	Nanna Egedius	Gerd Helland-Bjørnstad	Anne Marie Sæther	
1937	Gjøvik	Gerd Helland-Bjørnstad	Anne Marie Sæther	Jane Nicolson	
1938	Oslo	Gerd Helland-Bjørnstad	Anne Marie Sæther	Turid Helland-Bjørnstad	
1939	Kongsberg	Gerd Helland-Bjørnstad	Marit Henie	Turid Helland-Bjørnstad	
1940	Hamar	Turid Helland-Bjørnstad	Marit Henie	Kari Carlsen	
1941–45	No competitions due to World War II				
1946	Oslo	Marit Henie	Liv Borg	Kari Carlsen	
1947	Trondheim	Marit Henie	Liv Borg	Ingeborg Nilsson	
1948	Drammen	Marit Henie	Liv Borg	Bjørg Løhner Øien	
1949	Tønsberg	Marit Henie	Bjørg Løhner Øien	Ingeborg Nilsson	
1950	Trondheim	Marit Henie	Bjørg Løhner Øien	Ingeborg Nilsson	
1951	Lillehammer	Marit Henie	Ingeborg Nilsson	Eva Braarud	
1952	Gjøvik	Bjørg Løhner Øien	Ingeborg Nilsson	Bjørg Waaby	
1953	Skien	Ingeborg Nilsson	Marit Wang Halvorsen	Bjørg Skjælaaen	
1954	Oslo	Ingeborg Nilsson	Britt Turid Aronsen	No other competitors	
1955	Bergen	Britt Turid Aronsen	Bjørg Olsen	Liv Øye	
1956	Hamar	Britt Turid Aronsen	Ingeborg Nilsson	Bjørg Olsen	
1957	Larvik	Grete Borgen	Anne Karin Dehle	Bjørg Olsen	
1958	Notodden	Anne Karin Dehle	Grete Borgen	Astrid Ekeberg	
1959	Trondheim	Grete Borgen	Anne Karin Dehle	Siri Kamfjord	
1960	Hønefoss	Anne Karin Dehle	Astrid Ekeberg	Vivi Ann Østby	
1961	Sandefjord	Anne Karin Dehle	Berit Unn Johansen	Vivi Ann Østby	
1962	Harstad	Anne Karin Dehle	Astrid Ekeberg	Berit Unn Johansen	
1963	Hamar	Anne Karin Dehle	Vivi Ann Østby	Siri Kamfjord	
1964	Tønsberg	Berit Unn Johansen	Anne Karin Dehle	Ann-Catherine Andersen	
1965	Arendal	Anne Karin Dehle	Berit Unn Johansen	Gerd Pedersen	
1966	Drammen	Anne Karin Dehle	Gerd Pedersen	Lill Herberg	
1967	Trondheim	Anne Karin Dehle	Tone-Merethe Øien	Gerd Pedersen	
1968	Horten	Tone-Merethe Øien	Anne Karin Dehle	Drude Andersen	
1969	Lillehammer	Anne Karin Dehle	Tone-Merethe Øien	Bjørg Ellen Ringdal	
1970	Skien	Bjørg Ellen Ringdal	Tone-Merethe Øien	Eva Berg	
1971	Sarpsborg	Bjørg Ellen Ringdal	Anne Karin Dehle	Mona Wahlen	
1972	Asker	Bjørg Ellen Ringdal	Bente Tverran	Liv Egelund	
1973	Sarpsborg	Liv Egelund	Anne Egelund	Bente Tverran	
1974	Stavanger	Bente Tverran	Kristin Løken	Liv Egelund	
1975	Oslo	Bente Larsen	Kristin Løken	Unni Kjensli	
1976	Asker	Bente Larsen	Unni Kjensli	Grethe Solberg	
1977	Oslo	Bente Larsen	Unni Kjensli	Kristin Løken	
1978	Trondheim	Linda Schrøder	Kristin Løken	Hege Bekkevold	
1979	Stavanger	Linda Schrøder	Mette Jensen	Hege Bekkevold	
1980	Oslo	Anne Tomasgaard	Ellin Vatn	Hege Bekkevold	
1981	Oslo	Tine Mai Krian	Anne Gautland	Ellin Vatn	
1982	Fredrikstad	Tine Mai Krian	Cathrine Stornæs	Sigrid Guldberg	
1983	Hamar	Ellen Hyrum	Cathrine Stornæs	Trine Lyseggen	
1984	Asker	Vibecke Sørensen	Cathrine Stornæs	Anne Gro Mauland	
1985	Stavanger	Vibecke Sørensen	Cathrine Stornæs	Kristin Størmer	
1986	Trondheim	Anita Thorenfeldt	Vibecke Sørensen	Aurora Kufaas	
1987	Fredrikstad	Anita Thorenfeldt	Aurora Kufaas	Karina Feirud	
1988	Oslo	Anita Thorenfeldt	Aurora Kufaas	Vibecke Sørensen	
1989	Trondheim	Anita Thorenfeldt	Marianne Bruusgaard	Vibecke Sørensen	
1990	Oslo	Anita Thorenfeldt	Vibecke Sørensen	Tiril Edvardsen	
1991	Stavanger	Anita Thorenfeldt	Marianne Aarnes	Vibecke Sørensen	
1992	Lillehammer	Anita Thorenfeldt	Tiril Edvardsen	Anne Cecilie Lie	
1993	Oslo	Marianne Aarnes	Camilla Rismyhr	Ruth Charlotte Wessel	
1994	Fredrikstad	Anita Thorenfeldt	Camilla Rismyhr	Tiril Edvardsen	
1995	Asker	Kaja Hanevold	Anita Thorenfeldt	Ruth Charlotte Wessel	
1996	Lillehammer	Kaja Hanevold	Chona Anderl	Camilla Rismyhr	
1997	Oslo	Kaja Hanevold	Lise Røsto Jensen	Ruth Charlotte Wessel	
1998	Bergen	Kaja Hanevold	Chona Anderl	Lise Røsto Jensen	
1999	Asker	Chona Anderl	Tiril Mikkelsen	Linn Rønning	
2000	Trondheim	Linn Rønning	Tiril Mikkelsen	Annette Hoff	
2001	Oslo	Kaja Hanevold	Annette Hoff	Linn Rønning	
2002	Oslo	No women's competitors			
2003	Tønsberg	Madeleine Daleng	Marie Gran Aspunvik	Mia Falk-Larssen	
2004	Bergen	Madeleine Daleng	Marianne Fjørtoft	Marie Gran Aspunvik	
2005	Hamar	Madeleine Daleng	Marie Aspunvik	Kristiane Grøtvedt	
2006	Trondheim	Madeleine Daleng	Caroline Nilsen	Pernille Sandnes	
2007	Asker	No women's competitors			
2008	Tønsberg	Erle Harstad	June Falk-Larssen	Christine Isaksen	
2009	Bergen	Erle Harstad	Ann-Julie Arnesen	No other competitors	
2010	Oslo	Erle Harstad	Ann-Julie Arnesen	No other competitors	
2011	Hamar	Anne Line Gjersem	Ingrid Vee Kastet	No other competitors	
2012	Trondheim	Camilla Gjersem	Anine Rabe	Anne Line Gjersem	
2013	Stavanger	Camilla Gjersem	Anine Rabe	Maiken Louise Welde	
2014	Sarpsborg	Camilla Gjersem	Anine Rabe	Maiken Louise Welde	
2015	Asker	Anne Line Gjersem	Camilla Gjersem	Ingrid Katrina Bakke	
2016	Bergen	Anne Line Gjersem	Camilla Gjersem	Jemima Rasmuss	
2017	Hamar	Jemima Rasmuss	Juni Marie Benjaminsen	Ingrid Katrina Bakke	
2018	Stavanger	Camilla Gjersem	No other competitors		
2019	Hamar	Camilla Gjersem	Marianne Stålen	Marie Haas	
2020	Asker	Silja Anna Skulstad Urang	Kari Sofie Slørdahl Tellefsen	Marianne Stålen	
2021	Competition cancelled due to the COVID-19 pandemic				
2022	Oslo	Frida Turiddotter Berge	Silja Anna Skulstad Urang	Thea Karlstad	
2023	Trondheim	Mia Risa Gomez	Linnea Kilsand	Ingeborg Cecilie Slørdahl Tellefsen	
2024	Tromsø	Mia Risa Gomez	Kaia Kleven	Linnea Kilsand	
2025	Oslo	Mia Risa Gomez	Linnea Kilsand	Oda Tønnesen Havgar	
2026	Bergen	Mia Risa Gomez	Linnea Kilsand	Kaia Kleven	

=== Pairs ===
Senior pairs event medalists
Year	Location	Gold	Silver	Bronze	Ref.
1906	Trondheim	Hertha Olsen; Finn Schiøtt	Olga Jensen; Oscar Holthe	No other competitors	
1907	Hamar	Mimi Grøner; Karl Eriksen	Hertha Olsen; Yngvar Bryn	No other competitors	
1908	Kristiania	Alexia Schøien; Yngvar Bryn	Mimi Grøner; Karl Eriksen	No other competitors	
1909	Lillehammer	Alexia Schøien; Yngvar Bryn	Mimi Grøner; Karl Eriksen	No other competitors	
1910	Trondheim	Alexia Schøien; Yngvar Bryn	No other competitors		
1911	Kristiania	Alexia Schøien; Yngvar Bryn	Olga Jensen; Mr. Jensen	Margit Johansen; G. Fredriksen	
1912	Horten	Alexia Schøien; Yngvar Bryn	Olga Jensen; Mr. Jensen	No other competitors	
1913	Kristiania	Alexia Schøien; Yngvar Bryn	Solveig Andersen; Arthur Johansen	Margit Jacobsen; Bjarne Engebretsen	
1914	Kristiania	Astrid Nordsveen; Andreas Krogh	Alexia Bryn; Yngvar Bryn	Solveig Andersen; Arthur Johansen	
1915	Kristiania	Solveig Andersen; Arthur Johansen	Astrid Nordsveen; Andreas Krogh	Ingrid Lørdahl; Martinus Lørdahl	
1916	Drammen	Solveig Andersen; Arthur Johansen	Alexia Bryn; Yngvar Bryn	No other competitors	
1917	Kristiania	Solveig Andersen; Arthur Johansen	Alexia Bryn; Yngvar Bryn	No other competitors	
1918	Horten	Solveig Andersen; Arthur Johansen	No other competitors		
1919	Hamar	Alexia Bryn; Yngvar Bryn	Margit Engebretsen; Bjarne Engebretsen	No other competitors	
1920	Trondheim	Alexia Bryn; Yngvar Bryn	Margit Engebretsen; Bjarne Engebretsen	No other competitors	
1921	Moss	Alexia Bryn; Yngvar Bryn	No other competitors		
1922	Drammen	Alexia Bryn; Yngvar Bryn	No other competitors		
1923	Kristiania	Margit Engebretsen; Bjarne Engebretsen	Emmy Anderssen; S. Lorentzen	No other competitors	
1924	Kongsberg	Margit Engebretsen; Bjarne Engebretsen	No other competitors		
1925	Moss	Margit Engebretsen; Bjarne Engebretsen	Randi Bakke; Christen Christensen	Solveig Kinstad; Sigval Jacobsen	
1926	Tønsberg	Sonja Henie; Arne Lie	Randi Bakke; Christen Christensen	Solveig Kinstad; Sigval Jacobsen	
1927	Oslo	Sonja Henie; Arne Lie	No other competitors		
1928	Sandefjord	Sonja Henie; Arne Lie	Randi Bakke; Christen Christensen	No other competitors	
1929	Lillehammer	Randi Bakke; Christen Christensen	No other competitors		
1930	Hamar	Randi Bakke; Christen Christensen	No other competitors		
1931	Horten	Randi Bakke; Christen Christensen	No other competitors		
1932	Oslo	Randi Bakke; Christen Christensen	No other competitors		
1933	Notodden	Randi Bakke; Christen Christensen	No other competitors		
1934	Drammen	Randi Bakke; Christen Christensen	No other competitors		
1935	Brandbu	Randi Bakke; Christen Christensen	No other competitors		
1936	Oslo	Randi Bakke; Christen Christensen	No other competitors		
1937–38	No pairs competitors				
1939	Kongsberg	Bergljot Sandvik; Allan Fjeldheim	No other competitors		
1940	Hamar	Marit Henie; Erling Bjerkhoel	Margot Walle; Allan Fjeldheim	Inger Røed; Karsten Johansson	
1941–45	No competitions due to World War II				
1946	Oslo	Margot Walle; Allan Fjeldheim	Marit Henie; Erling Bjerkhoel	No other competitors	
1947	Trondheim	Margot Walle; Allan Fjeldheim	Marit Henie; Erling Bjerkhoel	No other competitors	
1948	Drammen	Margot Walle; Allan Fjeldheim	No other competitors		
1949	Tønsberg	Margot Walle; Allan Fjeldheim	Ragnhild Andersen; Reidar Børjeson	No other competitors	
1950	Trondheim	Marit Henie; Erling Bjerkhoel	Ragnhild Andersen; Reidar Børjeson	No other competitors	
1951	Lillehammer	Bjørg Skjælaaen; Reidar Børjeson	No other competitors		
1952	Gjøvik	Bjørg Skjælaaen; Reidar Børjeson	No other competitors		
1953	Skien	Bjørg Skjælaaen; Johannes Thorsen	Eva Brårud; Allan Fjeldheim	No other competitors	
1954	Oslo	Bjørg Skjælaaen; Johannes Thorsen	No other competitors		
1955	Bergen	Bjørg Skjælaaen; Johannes Thorsen	Ingeborg Nilsson; Reidar Børjeson	No other competitors	
1956	Hamar	Ingeborg Nilsson; Reidar Børjeson	No other competitors		
1957	Larvik	Ingeborg Nilsson; Reidar Børjeson	No other competitors		
1958	Notodden	Ingeborg Nilsson; Reidar Børjeson	No other competitors		
1959	Trondheim	Ingeborg Nilsson; Reidar Børjeson	Grete Borgen; Per Kjølberg	No other competitors	
1960	Hønefoss	Grete Borgen; Per Kjølberg	Liv Lunde; Erik Grünert	No other competitors	
1961	Sandefjord	Liv Lunde; Erik Grünert	No other competitors		
1962	Harstad	Liv Lunde; Erik Grünert	No other competitors		
1963	Hamar	Karin Bjerke Magnussen; Erik Grünert	No other competitors		
1964	Tønsberg	No pairs competitors			
1965	Arendal	Karin Bjerke Magnussen; Erik Grünert	No other competitors		
1966	Drammen	Karin Bjerke Magnussen; Erik Grünert	No other competitors		
1967	Trondheim	Anikken Støa; Erik Grünert	No other competitors		
1968	Horten	Karin Bjerke Magnussen; Erik Grünert	No other competitors		
No pairs competitors since 1968

== Junior medalists ==
=== Men's singles ===
Junior men's event medalists
Year	Location	Gold	Silver	Bronze	Ref.
1999–2002	No junior men's competitors				
2003	Tønsberg	Michael Chrolenko	No other competitors		
2004	Bergen	Michael Chrolenko	No other competitors		
2005	Hamar	Michael Chrolenko	Kim Nilsen	No other competitors	
2006	Trondheim	Kim Nilsen	Alexander Iversen	No other competitors	
2007	Asker	Kim Nilsen	No other competitors		
2008	Tønsberg	Kim Nilsen	Simon Bergersen	Christian Nilsen	
2009	Bergen	Kim Nilsen	Simon Bergersen	Christian Nilsen	
2010	Oslo	Simon Bergersen	No other competitors		
2011	Hamar	Simon Bergersen	No other competitors		
2012	Trondheim	No junior men's competitors			
2013	Stavanger	Sondre Oddvoll Bøe	No other competitors		
2014	Sarpsborg	No junior men's competitors			
2015	Asker	Sindre Sand Engebretsen	No other competitors		
2016–20	No junior men's competitors				
2021	Competition cancelled due to the COVID-19 pandemic				
2022	Oslo	Francis Thor Kværnø Sutton	No other competitors		
2023	Trondheim	No junior men's competitors			
2024	Tromsø	Daniil Valanov	No other competitors		
2025	Oslo	Daniil Valanov	No other competitors		
2026	Bergen	Daniil Valanov	Henrik Grande-Brostrøm	No other competitors	

=== Women's singles ===
Junior women's event medalists
Year	Location	Gold	Silver	Bronze	Ref.
1999	Asker	Sheila Alonso	Sheree Lynn Macatangay	Mia Falk Larssen	
2000	Trondheim	Marianne Fjørtoft	Mia Falk Larssen	Madeleine Daleng	
2001	Oslo	Madeleine Daleng	Mia Falk Larssen	Marianne Fjørtoft	
2002	Oslo	Marianne Fjørtoft	Madeleine Daleng	Anna Pouchkova	
2003	Tønsberg	Ina Seterbakken	Caroline Nilsen	Tanya Aas	
2004	Bergen	Ina Seterbakken	Caroline Nilsen	Tanya Aas	
2005	Hamar	Ina Seterbakken	Erle Harstad	Caroline Nilsen	
2006	Trondheim	Erle Harstad	June Falk-Larssen	Ann-Julie Arnesen	
2007	Asker	Erle Harstad	Ann-Julie Arnesen	June Falk-Larssen	
2008	Tønsberg	Anine Rabe	Hilde Aaby	Oda Halvorsen	
2009	Bergen	Anne Line Gjersem	Camilla Gjersem	Céline Mysen	
2010	Oslo	Anne Line Gjersem	Camilla Gjersem	Céline Mysen	
2011	Hamar	Camilla Gjersem	Céline Mysen	Anine Rabe	
2012	Trondheim	Nora Stenersen	Heidi Lillesæter	Thea Rabe	
2013	Stavanger	Thea Rabe	Jemima Rasmuss	Heidi Lillesæter	
2014	Sarpsborg	Thea Rabe	Jemima Rasmuss	Sine Mari Leite	
2015	Asker	Jemima Rasmuss	Ellen Yu	Juni Marie Benjaminsen	
2016	Bergen	Ellen Yu	Juni Marie Benjaminsen	Madeleine Lidholm Torgersen	
2017	Hamar	Ellen Yu	Kari-Sofie Slørdahl Tellefsen	Andrea Aschim Lae	
2018	Stavanger	Andrea Aschim Lae	Marianne Stålen	Ingrid Louise Vestre	
2019	Hamar	Frida Turidotter Berge	Silja Anna Skulstad Urang	Ingrid Louise Vestre	
2020	Asker	Frida Turidotter Berge	Mia Risa Gomez	Oda Tønnesen Havgar	
2021	Competition cancelled due to the COVID-19 pandemic				
2022	Oslo	Oda Tønnesen Havgar	Mia Risa Gomez	Ida Eline Vamnes	
2023	Trondheim	Oda Tønnesen Havgar	Kaia Kleven	Christina Jensen	
2024	Tromsø	Oda Tønnesen Havgar	Pernille With	Ida Eline Vamnes	
2025	Oslo	Pernille With	Therese Håvåg	Celin Beate Ellingsen	
2026	Bergen	Pernille With	Therese Håvåg	Margarita Kursite	

== Records ==
Records
Discipline	Most championship titles			
Discipline	Skater(s)	No.	Years	Ref.
Men's singles	Martin Stixrud	10	1913; 1916–24	
Women's singles	Anne Karin Dehle	9	1958; 1960–63; 1965–67; 1969	
Pairs	Alexia Schøien Bryn; Yngvar Bryn	10	1908–13; 1919–22	
