= Camilla Gjersem =

Norwegian figure skater

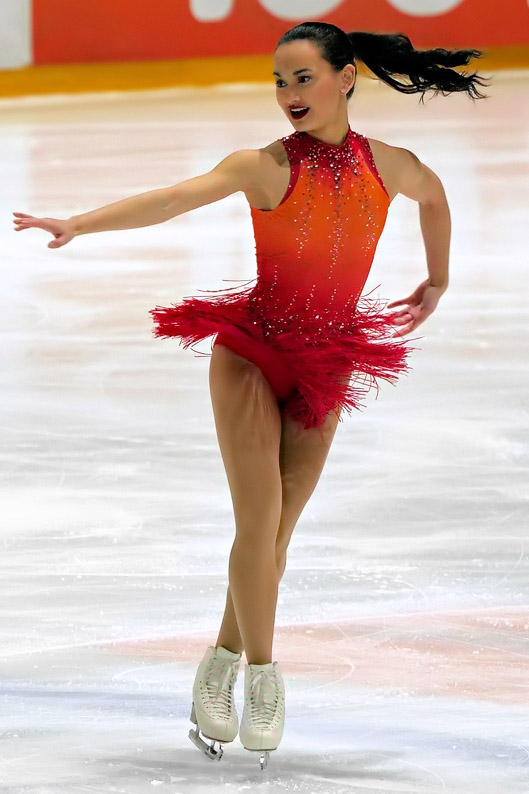
- Gjersem at the 2019 Challenge Cup

Personal information
- Full name: Camilla Marie Gjersem
- Born: 6 January 1994 (age 32) Hønefoss, Norway
- Home town: Asker, Norway
- Height: 1.58 m (5 ft 2 in)

Figure skating career
- Country: Norway
- Coach: Berit Steigendal
- Skating club: Asker FSC
- Began skating: 2002
- Retired: May 14, 2019

Camilla Marie Gjersem (born 6 January 1994) is a Norwegian former figure skater. She is a two-time Skate Copenhagen champion (2016, 2017), the 2016 Reykjavik International champion, the 2014 Warsaw Cup silver medalist, the 2018 Ice Star bronze medalist, and a five-time Norwegian national champion (2012–2014, 2018, 2019). She competed in the final segment at the 2015 European Championships.

== Personal life ==
Camilla Marie Gjersem was born together with a twin sister, Anne Line, on 6 January 1994 in Hønefoss, Norway. Their mother, Perlina Bangug, is a Filipina from Ilagan, Isabela, and their father, Petter Gjersem, a Norwegian from Raufoss. Camilla Gjersem is a law student at the University of Oslo.

== Career ==
Gjersem began skating in 2002. She received her first ISU Junior Grand Prix assignment in 2010. Training mainly in Asker, she was coached by Kaja Hanevold until the end of the 2010–11 season and then by Berit Steigendal.

Gjersem made her senior international debut at the 2011 Ice Challenge and her ISU Championship debut at the 2012 European Championships in Sheffield, England.

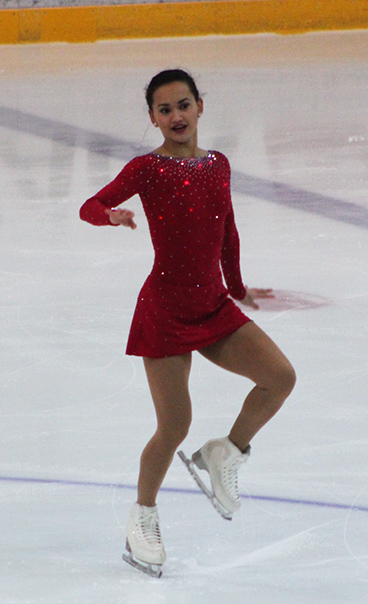
Gjersem in 2015

She was selected ahead of her sister to compete at the 2015 European Championships in Stockholm, Sweden. There she qualified for the final after placing 22nd in the short program. In the free skate she was 20th, and placed 21st overall.

In 2015, Gjersem was a favorite to win her fourth Norwegian national champion, but finished second to her sister Anne Line by a margin of 0.58 points. She was the Norwegian record holder for the ladies' short program (53.01), set at the 2015 Norwegian National Championships on January 18, 2015.

Gjersem sustained a knee injury in April 2016. She sat out most of the 2016–17 season, but competed at Skate Copenhagen in April 2017.

She retired from competition on May 7, 2019.

== Programs ==
Season	Short program	Free skating
2018–2019	Cinema Italiano by Kate Hudson	Introduction and Rondo Capriccioso by Camille Saint-Saëns; Music performed by Josh Groban
2017–2018	Paint It Black by The Rolling Stones	Introduction and Rondo Capriccioso by Camille Saint-Saëns; Music performed by Josh Groban
2016–2017	Paint It Black by The Rolling Stones	Fever; Spider-Man by Michael Bublé
2015–2016	The Havana Slide by Vanessa-Mae	Fever; Spider-Man by Michael Bublé
2014–2015	The Havana Slide by Vanessa-Mae	Piano Concerto No. 2 by Sergei Rachmaninoff
2013–2014	Come Together by The Beatles	Piano Concerto No. 2 by Sergei Rachmaninoff
2012–2013	Come Together by The Beatles	Butterfly Lovers' Violin Concerto performed by Vanessa-Mae
2011–2012	The Feeling Begins by Peter Gabriel	Butterfly Lovers' Violin Concerto performed by Vanessa-Mae
2010–2011	The Feeling Begins by Peter Gabriel	Porgy and Bess by George Gershwin

== Competitive highlights ==
CS: Challenger Series; JGP: Junior Grand Prix

International
Event	08–09	09–10	10–11	11–12	12–13	13–14	14–15	15–16	16–17	17–18	18–19
Europeans				34th			21st				33rd
CS Finlandia							9th	13th			21st
CS Golden Spin										12th	
CS Ice Challenge								16th			
CS Nebelhorn							9th				
CS Tallinn Trophy								14th			
CS Volvo Cup							4th				
Bavarian Open					14th						
Coupe Printemps							6th				
Crystal Skate					9th						
Cup of Tyrol										12th	
Denkova-Staviski										5th	8th
Gardena Trophy				6th							
Ice Challenge				17th							
Ice Star											3rd
Challenge Cup						7th					11th
Nordics				7th	5th	7th	6th	8th			10th
NRW Trophy				18th		9th		8th			
Ondrej Nepela						13th					
Reykjavik IG								1st			
Skate Copenhagen								1st	1st		
Tallinn Trophy							5th				
Triglav Trophy						7th					
Volvo Open Cup					10th						12th
Warsaw Cup					9th	2nd					
Universiade											11th
International: Junior
Junior Worlds					34th						
JGP Austria			28th	15th	22nd						
JGP France					15th						
JGP Estonia				20th							
Cup of Nice			9th								
Nordics		12th	8th								
Skate Celje		5th									
Triglav Trophy		2nd									
Warsaw Cup		10th	2nd	3rd							
National
Norwegian Champ.	2nd J	2nd J	1st J	1st	1st	1st	2nd	2nd	WD	1st	1st
