= Mia Risa Gomez =

Norwegian figure skater (born 2005)

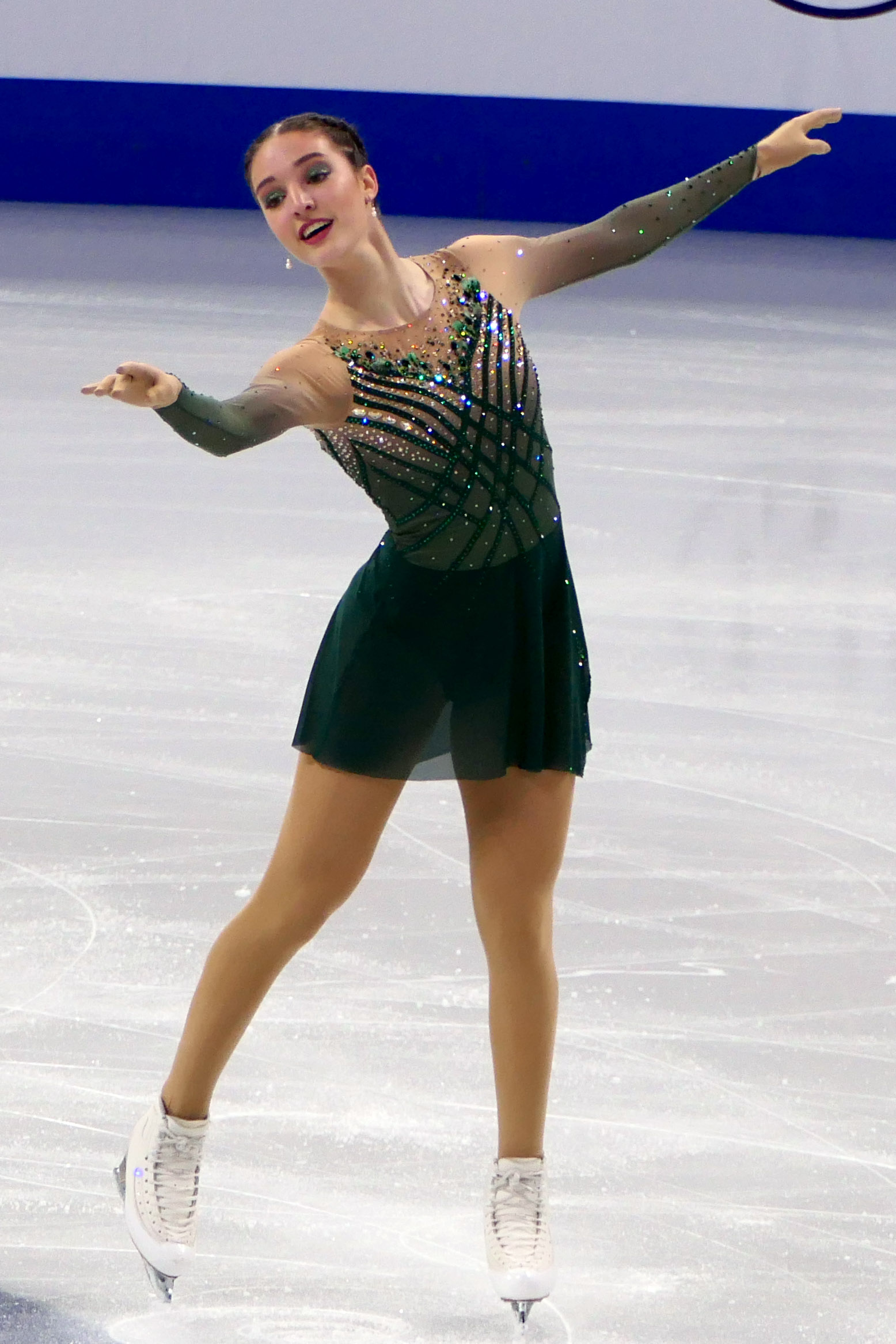
- Risa Gomez at the 2024 World Championships

Personal information
- Full name: Mia Caroline Risa Gomez
- Born: 21 December 2005 (age 20) Mexico City, Mexico
- Home town: Asker, Norway
- Height: 1.67 m (5 ft 6 in)

Figure skating career
- Country: Norway
- Discipline: Women's singles
- Coach: Hilde Aaby; Berit Steigedal
- Skating club: Asker Figure Skating Club
- Began skating: 2012

Medal record
Norwegian Championships
Gold medal – first place	2023 Trondheim	Singles
Gold medal – first place	2024 Tromsø	Singles
Gold medal – first place	2025 Oslo	Singles
Gold medal – first place	2026 Bergen	Singles

Mia Caroline Risa Gomez (born 21 December 2005) is a Norwegian figure skater. She is the 2026 Nebelhorn Trophy champion, the 2025 CS Warsaw Cup bronze medalist and a four-time Norwegian national champion (2023–2026). She is the first Norwegian to both medal in the ISU Challenger Series and to win a Challenger event. She has represented Norway at four World Championships and four European Figure Skating Championships.

On the junior level, she is a two-time Norwegian national silver medalist (2020 and 2022).

== Personal life ==
Mia Caroline Risa Gomez was born in Mexico City, to a Mexican mother and a Norwegian father. The family moved to Norway when she was two years old. She started skating for Stavanger Figure Skating Club and transferred to Asker Figure Skating Club during the summer of 2024.

== Career ==
=== Early years ===
Risa Gomez began learning to skate in 2012. She competed in the advanced novice category in the 2018–19 season and won the gold medal at the 2019 Norwegian Novice Championships.

=== 2019–20 season: Junior international debut ===
She made her junior international debut on the Junior Grand Prix series, finishing twenty-seventh at 2019 JGP Latvia before also going on to compete at the 2019 Golden Bear of Zagreb and the 2019 Tallinn Trophy, finishing fourteenth and nineteenth, respectively.

At the 2020 Norwegian Junior Championships, Risa Gomez won the silver medal.

Competing at the 2019 Reykjavik International Games, Risa Gomez placed eleventh. She then went on to place fifth at the 2020 Nordic Championships and tenth at the 2020 International Challenge Cup.

=== 2020–21 season ===
She had no international appearances in the 2020–21 season, which was affected by the COVID-19 pandemic.

=== 2021–22 season ===
Risa Gomez returned to the Junior Grand Prix series, finishing seventeenth at 2021 JGP Slovakia.

Competing at the 2022 Nordic Championships, Risa Gomez finished sixth, before going to finish thirteenth at the 2022 International Challenge Cup. She also went on to compete at the 2022 European Youth Olympic Festival, where she finished fourteenth. At the 2022 Norwegian Junior Championships, Risa Gomez won the silver medal for a third time.

Selected to compete at the 2022 World Junior Championships in Tallinn, Estonia, Risa Gomez placed thirty-seventh in the short program and did not advance to the free skate segment of the competition.

=== 2022–23 season: Senior international debut ===
Risa Gomez began her season on the Junior Grand Prix series, finishing nineteenth at 2022 JGP Poland I. Switching to the senior ranks, Risa Gomez won silver at the Denkova-Staviski Cup in Bulgaria, gold at the Open d'Andorra, and gold at the Santa Claus Cup in Hungary. By December, she attained the minimum technical score required to compete at senior Worlds and was officially nominated to represent Norway at the European Championships.

In January, Risa Gomez won the Norwegian senior national title and then competed at the 2023 European Championships in Helsinki. She qualified to the free skate and finished 22nd overall.

Risa Gomez went on to compete at the 2023 World Championships in Saitama, Japan, where she placed thirty-fifth in the short program and did not advance to the free skate segment of the competition.

=== 2023–24 season ===
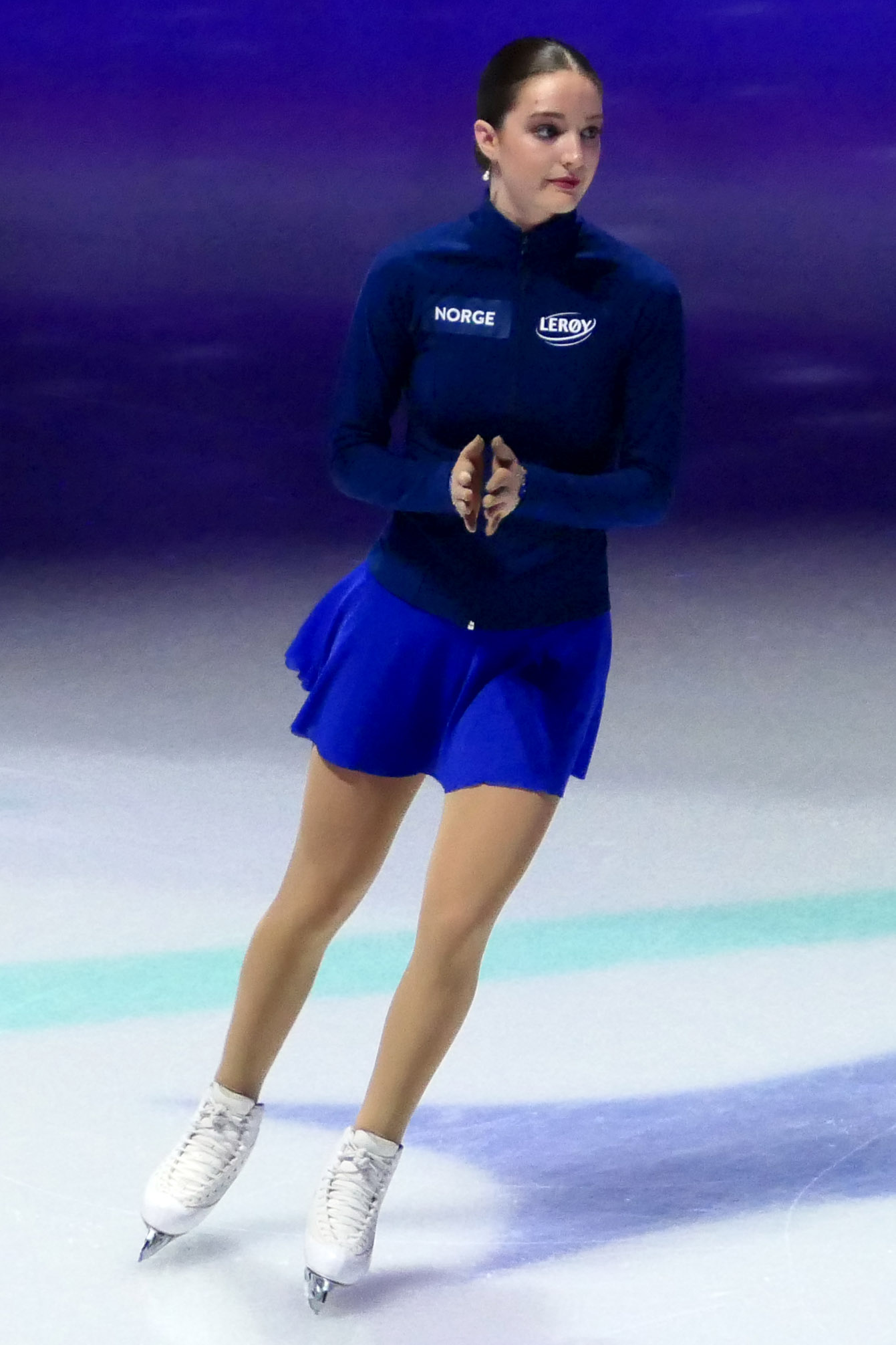
Mia Risa Gomez before her short program at the 2024 World Championships.

Risa Gomez started the season with two Challenger circuit appearances, with a thirteenth-place finish at the 2023 CS Lombardia Trophy and a sixteenth-place at the 2023 CS Finlandia Trophy. Between the two events, Risa Gomez also competed on the 2023–24 ISU Junior Grand Prix, finishing fourteenth at 2023 JGP Hungary. She then subsequently finished sixth at the 2023 Denkova-Staviski Cup.

Selected to compete at the 2024 European Championships in Kaunas, Lithuania, Risa Gomez placed twenty-sixth in the short program and failed to advance to the free skate segment of the competition. She would then go on to win her second consecutive national title at the 2024 Norwegian Championships before taking silver at the 2024 Nordic Open.

Risa would then finish the season by competing at both the 2024 World Junior Championships and the 2024 World Championships, finishing forty-third and twenty-third, respectively.

=== 2024–25 season ===
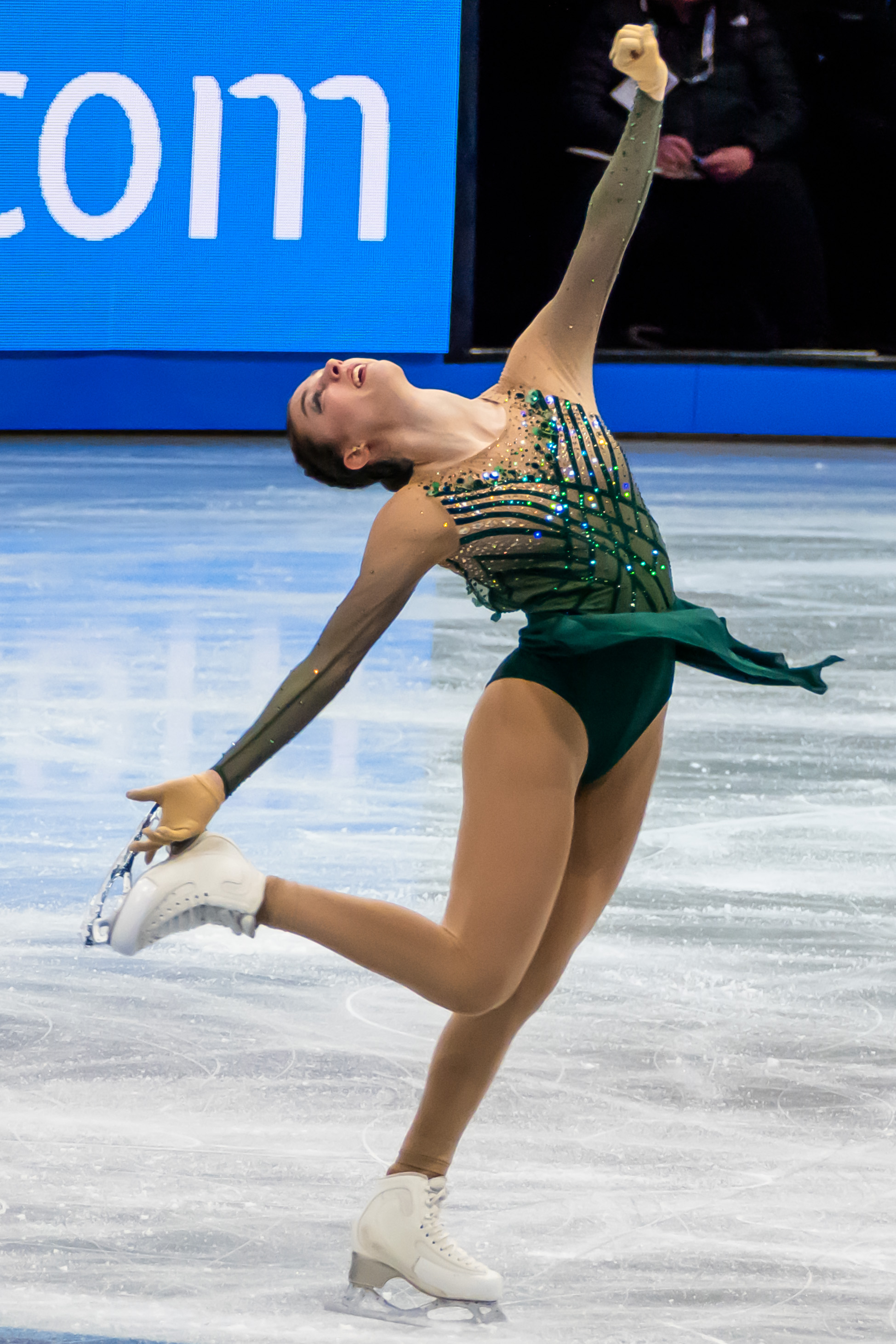
Risa Gomez performing a layback spin at the 2025 World Championships

Risa Gomez began the season by finishing twentieth at the 2024 CS Nebelhorn Trophy and tenth at the 2024 Tayside Trophy. She subsequently won the bronze medal at the 2024 Northern Lights Trophy before going on to finish eighteenth at the 2024 CS Tallinn Trophy.

At the 2025 Norwegian Championships, Risa Gomez won her third consecutive national title.

In January, following a bronze medal win at the 2025 Volvo Open Cup, Risa Gomez competed at the 2025 European Championships in Tallinn, Estonia. She fell on a triple flip jump in her short program and finished in sixteenth place in that part of the competition, but she rose to twelfth overall after the free skate. Hers was the best result at the European Championships for a Norwegian woman in almost 90 years after the retirement of Sonja Henie. She followed up this result with fifth-place finishes at the 2025 Nordic Open Championships and at the 2025 Sonja Henie Trophy.

Going on to compete at the 2025 World Championships in Boston, Massachusetts, United States, Risa Gomez placed twenty-ninth in the short program and did not advance to the free skate segment.

=== 2025–26 season: Challenger Series bronze ===
Risa Gomez opened her season by finishing seventh at the ISU Skate to Milano and winning bronze at the 2025 Budapest Trophy. In November, Risa Gomez won the Cup of Innsbruck. During her free skate, she landed seven triple jumps, which was a first for a Norwegian skater. The week after, she competed at the 2025 CS Warsaw Cup and won the bronze medal. This achievement marked the first time a Norwegian figure skater earned a medal in the ISU Challenger Series. The following month, Risa Gomez won her fourth consecutive national title at the 2026 Norwegian Championships.

In January, Risa Gomez competed at the European Championships in Sheffield, England, finishing in fourteenth place overall. The following week, she won the silver medal behind Iida Karhunen at the 2026 Nordic Championships. Two months later, she won the silver medal at the 2026 Sonja Henie Trophy.

At the 2026 World Championships, she finished 32nd in the short program segment, unable to qualify for the free skate.

=== 2026–27 season: Challenger Series gold ===
Risa Gomez began the new season by competing at the 2026 Nebelhorn Trophy. She placed first in both program segments, winning the gold medal. Her gold medal marked the first ever Challenger Series gold for Norwegian skaters.

== Programs ==
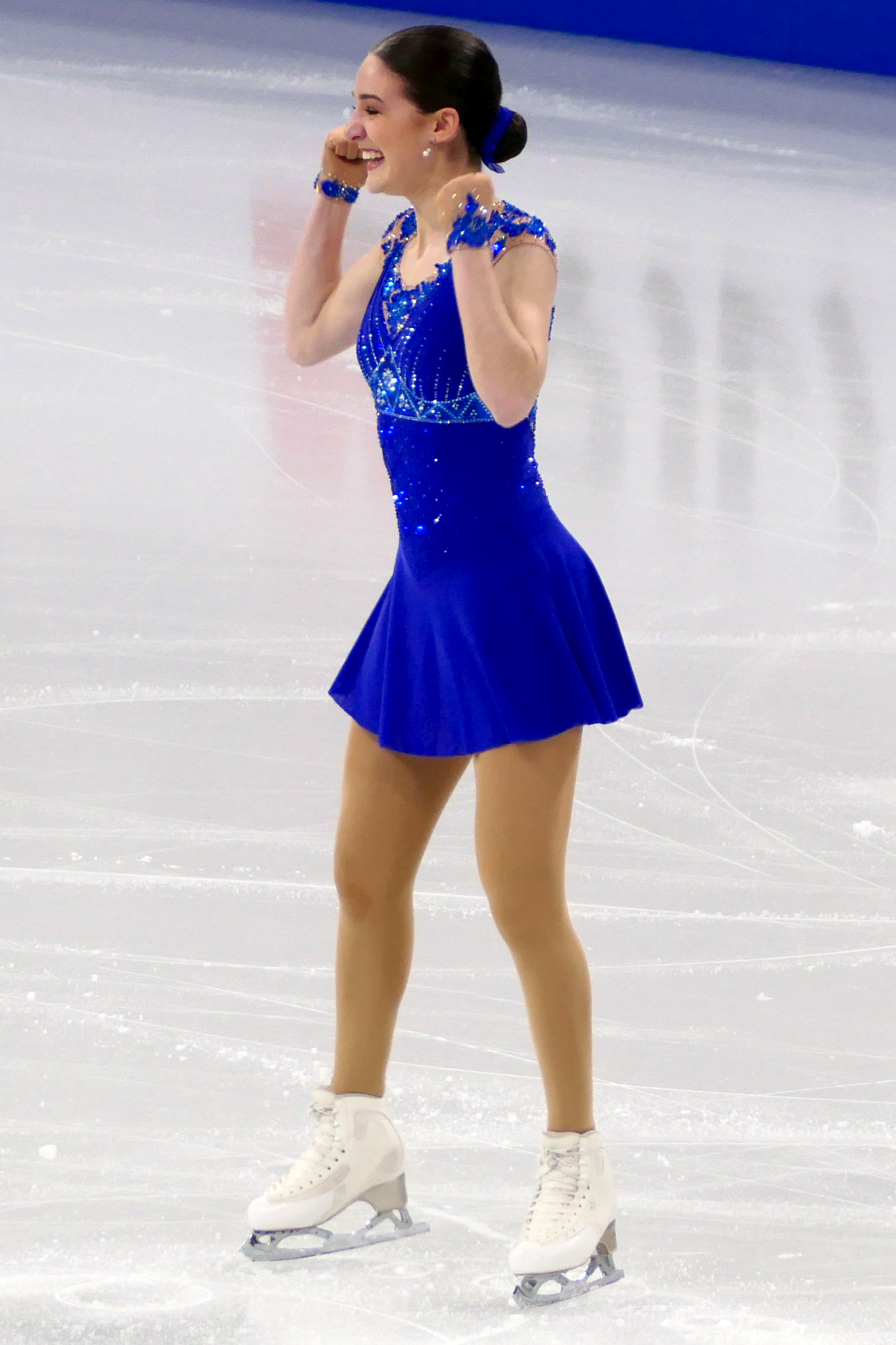
Risa Gomez after completing her short program at the 2024 World Championships

Season	Short program	Free skating
2026–2027	Chasing Cars by Snow Patrol performed by Tommee Profitt & Fleurie choreo. by Tom Dickson, Sondre Oddvoll Bøe	Moulin Rouge (soundtrack) choreo. by Sondre Oddvoll Bøe
2025–2026	Chasing Cars by Snow Patrol performed by Tommee Profitt & Fleurie choreo. by Tom Dickson, Sondre Oddvoll Bøe	Earth Melodies by Ekaterina Shelehova; Forgotten Odes by Eternal Eclipse choreo. by Tom Dickson, Sondre Oddvoll Bøe, Lorenzo Magri
2024–2025	Metamorphosis Two by Philip Glass & Nicolas Horvath choreo. by Sondre Oddvoll Bøe, Angélique Abachkina, Lorenzo Magri	Earth Melodies by Ekaterina Shelehova; Forgotten Odes by Eternal Eclipse choreo. by Tom Dickson, Sondre Oddvoll Bøe, Lorenzo Magri
2023–2024	Metamorphosis Two by Philip Glass & Nicolas Horvath choreo. by Sondre Oddvoll Bøe, Angélique Abachkina, Lorenzo Magri	Samurai Swords by Highasakite; Happiness Does Not Wait by Ólafur Arnalds choreo. by Sondre Oddvoll Bøe
2022–2023	Metamorphosis Two by Philip Glass & Nicolas Horvath choreo. by Sondre Oddvoll Bøe, Angélique Abachkina, Lorenzo Magri	Wonder Woman by Rupert Gregson-Williams; Wonder Woman 1984 by Hans Zimmer choreo. by Moa Johanna Lindgren
2021–2022	It by Benjamin Wallfisch choreo. by Moa Johanna Lindgren	Wonder Woman by Rupert Gregson-Williams; Wonder Woman 1984 by Hans Zimmer choreo. by Moa Johanna Lindgren
2019–2020	Unlocking the Mind (from The Theory of Everything) by Samuel Karl Bohn choreo. by Johanna Alik	Mary Poppins Returns by Marc Shaiman & Scott Wittman choreo. by Johanna Alik

== Competitive highlights ==
- JGP – Event of the ISU Junior Grand Prix Series
- CS – Event of the ISU Challenger Series
- TBD – Placement to be decided
- WD - Withdraw

Competition placements at senior level
Season	2022–23	2023–24	2024–25	2025–26	2026–27
World Championships	35th	23rd	29th	32nd	
European Championships	22nd	26th	12th	14th	
Norwegian Championships	1st	1st	1st	1st	
CS Finlandia Trophy		16th			
CS Lombardia Trophy		13th			
CS Nebelhorn Trophy			20th		1st
CS Tallinn Trophy			18th		4th
CS Warsaw Cup				3rd	
CS Budapest Trophy				3rd	10th
Cup of Innsbruck				1st	
Denkova-Staviski Cup	2nd	6th			
Ice Challenge					3rd
Nordics	5th	2nd	5th	2nd	
Northern Lights Trophy			3rd		
Open d'Andorra	1st				
Santa Claus Cup	1st				
Skate to Milano				7th	
Sonja Henie Trophy			5th	2nd	
Tayside Trophy			10th		
Volvo Open Cup			3rd		

Competition placements at junior level
Season	2019–20	2020–21	2021–22	2022–23	2023–24
World Junior Championships			37th		43rd
Norwegian Championships	2nd		2nd		
JGP Hungary					14th
JGP Latvia	27th				
JGP Poland				19th	
JGP Slovakia			17th		
Challenge Cup	10th		13th		
EYOF			14th		
Golden Bear of Zagreb	14th				
Nordics	5th		6th		
Reykjavik International Games	11th				
Tallinn Trophy	19th				

== Detailed results ==
ISU personal best scores in the +5/-5 GOE System
Segment	Type	Score	Event
Total	TSS	177.55	2026 CS Tallinn Trophy
Short program	TSS	61.92	2026 CS Tallinn Trophy
Short program	TES	35.85	2026 CS Tallinn Trophy
Short program	PCS	26.65	2025 Skate to Milano
Free skating	TSS	117.35	2026 CS Nebelhorn Trophy
Free skating	TES	63.16	2026 CS Tallinn Trophy
Free skating	PCS	55.67	2026 CS Nebelhorn Trophy

=== Senior results ===
Results in the 2022-23 season
Date	Event	SP		FS		Total	
Date	Event	P	Score	P	Score	P	Score
Nov 1-6, 2022	(Bulgaria) 2022 Denkova-Staviski Cup	4	51.25	1	105.26	2	156.51
Nov 17-20, 2022	2022 Open d'Andorra	1	55.20	1	94.37	1	149.57
Nov 28 - Dec 4, 2022	(Hungary) 2022 Santa Claus Cup	1	58.86	2	104.18	1	163.04
Jan 13-15, 2023	(Norway) 2026 Norwegian Championships	1	50.99	1	109.15	1	160.14
Jan 25–29, 2023	(Finland) 2023 European Championships	21	49.14	22	88.48	22	137.62
Feb 1–5, 2023	(Iceland) 2023 Nordic Championships	7	57.57	5	93.93	5	144.49
Mar 22–26, 2023	(Japan) 2023 World Championships	35	43.54	—N/a	—N/a	35	43.54

Results in the 2023-24 season
Date	Event	SP		FS		Total	
Date	Event	P	Score	P	Score	P	Score
Sep 8–10, 2023	(Italy) 2023 CS Lombardia Trophy	13	46.50	13	83.03	13	129.53
Oct 4-8, 2023	(Finland) 2023 CS Finlandia Trophy	17	43.48	13	93.35	16	136.83
Nov 7-12, 2023	(Bulgaria) 2023 Denkova-Staviski Cup	6	50.98	8	90.18	7	141.16
Jan 10–14, 2024	(Lithuania) 2024 European Championships	26	48.65	—N/a	—N/a	26	48.65
Jan 26-28, 2024	(Norway) 2024 Norwegian Championships	1	56.45	1	113.46	1	169.91
Feb 1–4, 2024	(Sweden) 2024 Nordic Championships	10	44.03	1	110.00	2	155.03
Mar 18–24, 2024	(United States) 2024 World Championships	23	55.09	24	92.04	23	147.13

Results in the 2024-25 season
Date	Event	SP		FS		Total	
Date	Event	P	Score	P	Score	P	Score
Sep 19–21, 2024	(Germany) 2024 CS Nebelhorn Trophy	20	41.47	20	73.43	20	114.90
Oct 12–13, 2024	(United Kingdom) 2024 Tayside Trophy	10	44.21	9	80.66	10	124.87
Oct 25-27, 2024	(Iceland) 2024 Northern Lights Trophy	2	47.13	4	73.53	3	120.66
Nov 12-17, 2024	(Estonia) 2024 CS Tallinn Trophy	19	35.20	13	84.52	18	119.72
Dec 8-8, 2024	(Norway) 2025 Norwegian Championships	1	57.01	1	110.77	1	167.78
Jan 16-18, 2025	(Latvia) 53rd Volvo Open Cup	3	51.15	3	101.03	3	152.18
Jan 28 – Feb 2, 2025	(Estonia) 2025 European Championships	16	50.72	8	110.99	12	161.71
Feb 6–9, 2025	(Norway) 2025 Nordic Championships	12	43.44	2	108.98	5	152.40
Mar 6–9, 2025	(Norway) 2025 Sonja Henje Trophy	6	52.10	5	102.07	5	154.17
Mar 25–30, 2025	(United States) 2025 World Championships	29	46.43	—N/a	—N/a	29	46.43

Results in the 2025–26 season
Date	Event	SP		FS		Total	
Date	Event	P	Score	P	Score	P	Score
Sep 18–21, 2025	(China) 2025 Skate to Milano	6	59.30	7	102.39	7	161.69
Oct 10–12, 2025	(Hungary) 2025 Budapest Trophy	4	50.61	3	103.90	3	154.51
Nov 13–16, 2025	(Austria) 2025 Cup of Innsbruck	2	54.93	1	115.81	1	170.64
Nov 19–23, 2025	(Poland) 2025 CS Warsaw Cup	6	53.81	3	108.15	3	161.96
Dec 5–7, 2025	(Norway) 2026 Norwegian Championships	1	60.37	1	103.25	1	163.62
Jan 13–18, 2026	(United Kingdom) 2026 European Championships	17	53.07	15	105.22	14	158.29
Jan 28 – Feb 1, 2026	(Denmark) 2026 Nordic Championships	4	52.70	2	114.52	2	167.22
Mar 5–8, 2026	(Norway) 2026 Sonja Henie Trophy	2	57.58	1	118.20	2	175.78
Mar 24–29, 2026	(Czech Republic) 2026 World Championships	32	42.51	—N/a	—N/a	32	42.51

Results in the 2026–27 season
Date	Event	SP		FS		Total	
Date	Event	P	Score	P	Score	P	Score
Sep 24–26, 2026	(Germany) 2026 CS Nebelhorn Trophy	1	58.45	1	117.35	1	175.80
Nov 5-8, 2026	(Austria) 2026 Ice Challenge	3	57.33	3	112.69	3	170.02
Nov 16–22, 2026	(Estonia) 2026 CS Tallinn Trophy	6	61.92	4	115.63	4	177.55

=== Junior results ===
2023–24 season
Date	Event	SP	FS	Total
February 26– March 3, 2024	2024 World Junior Championships	43; 37.97	DNQ	43; 37.97
September 20–23, 2023	2023 JGP Hungary	20; 45.17	9; 101.28	14; 146.45
2022–23 season
Date	Event	SP	FS	Total
September 28–October 1, 2022	2022 JGP Poland I	17; 50.72	19; 87.71	17; 138.43
2021–22 season
Date	Event	SP	FS	Total
April 13–17, 2022	2022 World Junior Championships	37; 40.33	–	37; 40.33
April 1–3, 2022	2022 Norwegian Junior Championships	2; 46.44	2; 82.18	2; 128.62
March 20–25, 2022	2022 European Youth Olympic Winter Festival	9; 48.60	18; 76.11	14; 124.71
February 24–27, 2022	2022 International Challenge Cup	12; 40.94	14; 66.44	13; 107.38
January 27–30, 2022	2022 Nordic Championships	7; 41.62	6; 79.93	6; 121.55
September 1–4, 2021	2021 JGP Slovakia	18; 39.48	16; 76.72	17; 116.20
2020–21 season
Date	Event	SP	FS	Total
March 20–24, 2021	Norwegian national digital competition	2; 46.07	–	2; 46.07
2019–20 season
Date	Event	SP	FS	Total
February 20–23, 2020	2020 International Challenge Cup	10; 42.00	9; 82.74	10; 124.74
February 5–9, 2020	2020 Nordic Championships	11; 39.26	6; 77.92	5; 117.18
January 24–26, 2020	2020 Reykjavik International Games	15; 31.79	9; 67.86	11; 99.65
January 10–12, 2020	2020 Norwegian Junior Championships	2; 39.02	3; 68.48	2; 107.50
November 11–17, 2019	2019 Tallinn Trophy	20; 31.92	19; 60.78	20; 92.70
October 24–27, 2019	2019 Golden Bear of Zagreb	21; 38.56	11; 73.98	14; 112.54
September 4–7, 2020	2019 JGP Latvia	30; 32.13	28; 64.24	27; 96.37
