= Sondre Oddvoll Bøe =

Norwegian figure skater

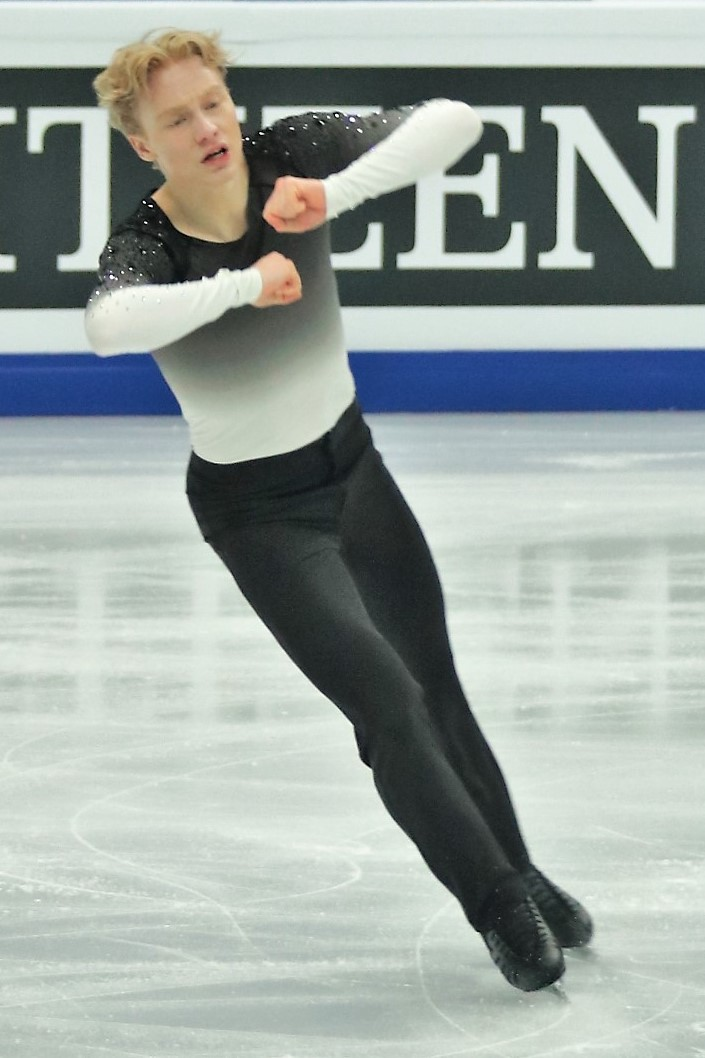

Personal information
- Born: 13 January 1998 (age 28) Bærum, Norway
- Height: 1.80 m (5 ft 11 in)

Figure skating career
- Country: Norway
- Coach: Michael Huth, Berit Steigedal
- Skating club: Asker FSC
- Began skating: 2002
- Retired: March 19, 2021

Sondre Oddvoll Bøe (born 13 January 1998) is a Norwegian former figure skater. He is the 2019 Nordic champion and a four-time Norwegian national champion. He has competed in the final segment at nine ISU Championships (six European and three World Junior Championships).

== Personal life ==
Sondre Oddvoll Bøe was born on 13 January 1998 in Bærum, Norway. He attended Bjørknes secondary school in Oslo. His older sister, Emilie, has also competed in figure skating. He also has a younger brother named Haakon. Bøe practiced gymnastics in addition to figure skating until he was 11 years old.

== Career ==
Bøe began learning to skate in 2002. From an early age, he trained mainly under Berit Steigedal in Asker, Norway, and visited Oberstdorf, Germany for additional coaching by Michael Huth. After debuting on the ISU Junior Grand Prix (JGP) series in 2012, he competed at the 2013 World Junior Championships in Milan but did not reach the free skate.

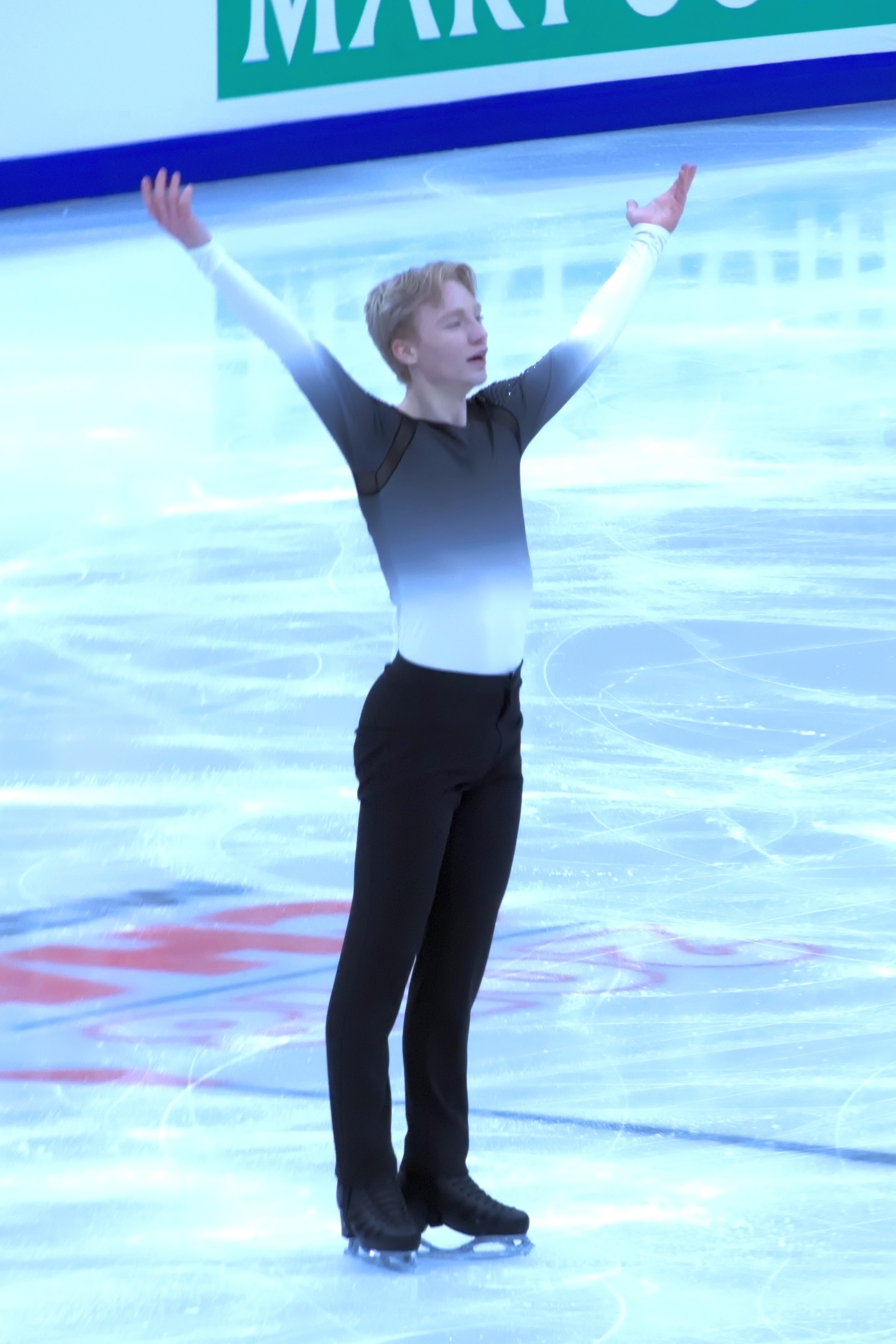
Bøe at the EFSK (2018)

Making his senior international debut, he placed 25th at the 2014 European Championships in Budapest, Hungary. He qualified for the free skate at the 2014 World Junior Championships in Sofia, Bulgaria and finished 24th overall.

In the summer of 2014, Bøe decided to train mainly in Oberstdorf. Competing in the 2014–15 JGP series, he placed 13th in Tallinn and 14th in Dresden. He was named in the Norwegian team to the 2015 European Championships in Stockholm, Sweden. There he qualified for the free skate, and placed 22nd overall. At the Nordics he won the senior silver medal. Bøe also competed at the 2015 Junior Worlds in Tallinn, but was eliminated after the short.

During the 2015–16 JGP series, Bøe placed tenth at both of his assignments, in Riga and Torun. Ranked 20th in the short, he advanced to the free skate at the 2016 European Championships in Bratislava and finished 24th overall. He also reached the final segment at the 2016 World Junior Championships in Debrecen, Hungary, placing 21st overall.

Bøe returned to Norway by December 2017, deciding to rejoin Berit Steigedal in Asker. In February 2019, he outscored Alexander Majorov to win gold at The Nordics.

Bøe retired from competitive skating in March 2021.

== Programs ==
Season	Short program	Free skating
2020–2021	Someone You Loved by Lewis Capaldi choreo. by Tom Dickson	The Four Seasons by Antonio Vivaldi choreo. by Tom Dickson
2019–2020	I Found You by James Bay choreo. by Sondre Oddvoll Bøe	Loving You; Wildfire by Seafret choreo. by Mark Pillay
2018–2019	You Are the Reason by Calum Scott choreo. by Mark Pillay	Les Misérables: Bring Him Home performed by The Piano Guys; Bring Him Home performed by Josh Groban choreo. by Mark Pillay
2017–2018	Silent Storm by Carl Espen	Exogenesis: Symphony by Muse
2016–2017	I See Fire by Ed Sheeran choreo. by Michael Huth	Bring Him Home (from Les Misérables) by Claude-Michel Schönberg choreo. by Michael Huth
2015–2016	Puttin' On the Ritz (Club des Belugas remix) by Irving Berlin	Mi Mancherai by Josh Groban (feat. Joshua Bell)
2014–2015	A Day in the Life by The Beatles choreo. by Kaja Hanevold	Tango medley by Astor Piazzolla choreo. by Kaja Hanevold
2013–2014	Crime Spree (from Dick Tracy) by Danny Elfman; The Strength of the Righteous (from The Untouchables) by Ennio Morricone choreo. by Kaja Hanevold	Tango medley by Astor Piazzolla choreo. by Kaja Hanevold
2012–2013	Crime Spree (from Dick Tracy) by Danny Elfman; The Strength of the Righteous (from The Untouchables) by Ennio Morricone choreo. by Kaja Hanevold	Prince Igor by Alexander Borodin

== Competitive highlights ==
CS: Challenger Series; JGP: Junior Grand Prix

International
Event	12–13	13–14	14–15	15–16	16–17	17–18	18–19	19–20
Europeans		25th	22nd	24th	24th	22nd	18th	21st
CS Finlandia							14th	
CS Golden Spin			14th			16th		
CS Lombardia						14th		11th
CS Nebelhorn						20th		
CS Ondrej Nepela								9th
CS Tallinn Trophy				8th				
CS Warsaw Cup			14th	10th	11th			
Bavarian Open					8th			
Challenge Cup						9th	9th	15th
Cup of Nice				13th				
Cup of Tyrol						7th		
Denkova-Staviski							3rd	9th
Golden Bear					6th			
Ice Star							9th	
Nordics		5th	2nd				1st	2nd
Printemps						8th		
Santa Claus Cup								4th
Toruń Cup				5th	9th			
Triglav Trophy		7th						
Volvo Open							8th	13th
International: Junior
Junior Worlds	26th	24th	26th	21st	19th			
JGP Austria	12th							
JGP Estonia			13th					
JGP France	15th				8th			
JGP Germany			14th					
JGP Latvia		23rd		10th				
JGP Poland		14th		10th				
JGP Slovenia					11th			
Crystal Skate	3rd J							
EYOF	7th J							
Nordics	1st J							
NRW Trophy		6th J						
Volvo Cup	4th J							
Warsaw Cup	2nd J	1st J						
National
Norwegian	1st J	1st		1st			1st	1st
J = Junior; WD = Withdrew
