= Ingeborg Nilsson =

Norwegian figure skater

Ingeborg Nilsson (23 November 1924 – 3 February 1995) was a Norwegian figure skater. She competed at the 1952 Winter Olympics in Oslo. She was Norwegian individual champion in 1953 and 1954, and in pairs in 1956, 1957, 1958 and 1959 together with partner Reidar Børjeson.

== Results ==
=== Ladies singles ===
Event	1947	1948	1949	1950	1951	1952	1953	1954	1955	1956
Winter Olympic Games						24th				
World Championships	15th							20th		
European Championships				15th						
Nordic Championships								1st	1st	2nd
Norwegian Championships							1st	1st		

=== Pairs ===
(with Børjeson)

Event	1955	1956	1957	1958	1959
World Championships				15th	
Nordic Championships	2nd	1st	2nd	2nd	
Norwegian Championships		1st	1st	1st	1st
