= Thea Rabe =

Norwegian figure skater

Personal information
- Born: 2 January 1995 (age 31) Tønsberg, Norway
- Home town: Tønsberg
- Height: 1.68 m (5 ft 6 in)

Figure skating career
- Country: Norway
- Began skating: 2002

Thea Rabe (born 2 January 1995) is a Norwegian figure skater. Competing in ice dancing with American Timothy Koleto, she won the bronze medal at the 2015 Volvo Open Cup. As a single skater, she is a two-time Norwegian national junior champion (2013 and 2014).

== Personal life ==
Thea Rabe was born on 2 January 1995 in Tønsberg, Norway. She is the younger sister of Norwegian figure skater Anine Rabe.

== Career ==
=== Single skating ===
Rabe began learning to skate at the age of seven in 2002. Competing in ladies' singles, she won the Norwegian national junior title in the 2012–2013 and 2013–2014 seasons.

=== Ice dancing ===
Rabe had tryouts with American ice dancer Timothy Koleto in November 2014 in Lyon, France, and the following month in Novi, Michigan, where he trained. They agreed to skate together for Norway. In May 2015, Rabe moved to the United States to train with Koleto. Igor Shpilband, Adrienne Lenda, Fabian Bourzat, and Greg Zuerlein coached the team in Novi, Michigan.

After being released by South Korea and sitting out one year, as required by the International Skating Union, Koleto became eligible to compete for Norway beginning October 20, 2015. Making their international debut, Rabe/Koleto won the bronze medal at the Volvo Open Cup in November 2015. They placed 8th at the Open d'Andorra and CS Warsaw Cup. Despite qualifying to the 2016 European Championships, they decided to end their partnership a few weeks before the event. They were Norway's first-ever ice dancing team.

== Programs ==
=== With Koleto ===
Season	Short dance	Free dance
2015–2016	Cinderella by Sergei Prokofiev; Waltz: Cinderella's Departure for the Ball; March: Clock Scene; Waltz: Cinderella's Departure for the Ball choreo. by Barbara Fusar-Poli, Igor Shpilband	Peer Gynt by Edvard Grieg; Morning; In the Hall of the Mountain King choreo. by Igor Shpilband, Fabian Bourzat

=== Single skating ===
Season	Short program	Free skating
2013–2014	Cats (musical) by Andrew Lloyd Webber	1492: Conquest of Paradise by Vangelis
2012–2013	Cats (musical) by Andrew Lloyd Webber	Stardust by Ilan Eshkeri
2011–2012	Jalousie 'Tango Tzigane' by Jacob Gade	Stardust by Ilan Eshkeri

== Competitive highlights ==
CS: Challenger Series

=== Ice dancing with Koleto ===
International
Event	2015–16
CS Warsaw Cup	8th
Volvo Open Cup	3rd
Open d'Andorra	8th

=== Ladies' singles ===
International: Junior
Event	09-10	10–11	11–12	12–13	13–14
Nordics					12th
Tallinn Trophy					4th
Volvo Open Cup				4th	
Warsaw Cup			12th		
International: Advanced Novice
Skate Celje	2nd				
Triglav Trophy	12th				
National
Norwegian Champ.	1st N	4th J	3rd J	1st J	1st J
Levels: N = Novice; J = Junior
