= Silja Anna Skulstad Urang =

Norwegian figure skater

Personal information
- Full name: Silja Anna Skulstad Urang
- Born: 6 January 2000 (age 26)
- Home town: Bergen, Norway

Figure skating career
- Country: Norway
- Coach: Maciej Kuś
- Skating club: Bergen FSC

Silja Anna Skulstad Urang (born 6 January 2000) is a Norwegian competitive figure skater. She is the 2020 Norwegian Champion. She is also the 2019 Norwegian Junior silver medalist.

== Programs ==
Season	Short program	Free skating
2020–2021	Vole Celine Dion	O and Fix You by Coldplay
