= Patricia Molony =

Australian figure skater (1926–2025)

Personal information
- Full name: Patricia Molony
- Born: 24 August 1926 Melbourne, Australia
- Died: 3 October 2025 (aged 99)

Figure skating career
- Country: Australia

Patricia Muriel Molony (later Massina, 24 August 1926 – 3 October 2025) was an Australian figure skater. She was the 1947 Australian national champion. At the 1947 World Figure Skating Championships, she became the first Australian lady to compete at the World Championships. She also competed at the European Figure Skating Championships before that event was restricted to European skaters only.

== Background ==
Patricia Muriel Molony was born in Melbourne on 24 August 1926. She came from a skating family. Her father E.J. "Ted" Molony competed in ice dancing, and her younger sister Gweneth competed at the Olympics. Patricia Molony died on 3 October 2025, at the age of 99.

== Competitive highlights ==
International
| Event | 46-47 | 47-48 |
|---|---|---|
| Worlds | 12th | |
| Europeans | 16th | |
National
| Australian Champs. | | 1st |

== Sources ==
- "Australian national champions 1931-2004" (PDF). Archived from the original (PDF) on 29 August 2007.
- "ICE SKATING AUSTRALIA: International Placings" (PDF). Archived from the original (PDF) on 12 September 2009.
