= Arthur Apfel =

South African-British figure skater

Personal information
- Full name: Arthur Apfel
- Born: 29 October 1922 Johannesburg, South Africa
- Died: 15 September 2017 (aged 94) Johannesburg, South Africa

Figure skating career
- Country: United Kingdom
Medal record
Representing United Kingdom
Men's Figure skating
World Championships
Bronze medal – third place	1947 Stockholm	Men's singles

Arthur Apfel (29 October 1922 – 15 September 2017) was a South African-British figure skater. He was the 1947 World bronze medalist. He was also known for his spinning ability.

== Results ==
Event	1947
World Championships	3rd
European Championships	4th
British Championships	1st
