= Anne Line Gjersem =

Norwegian figure skater

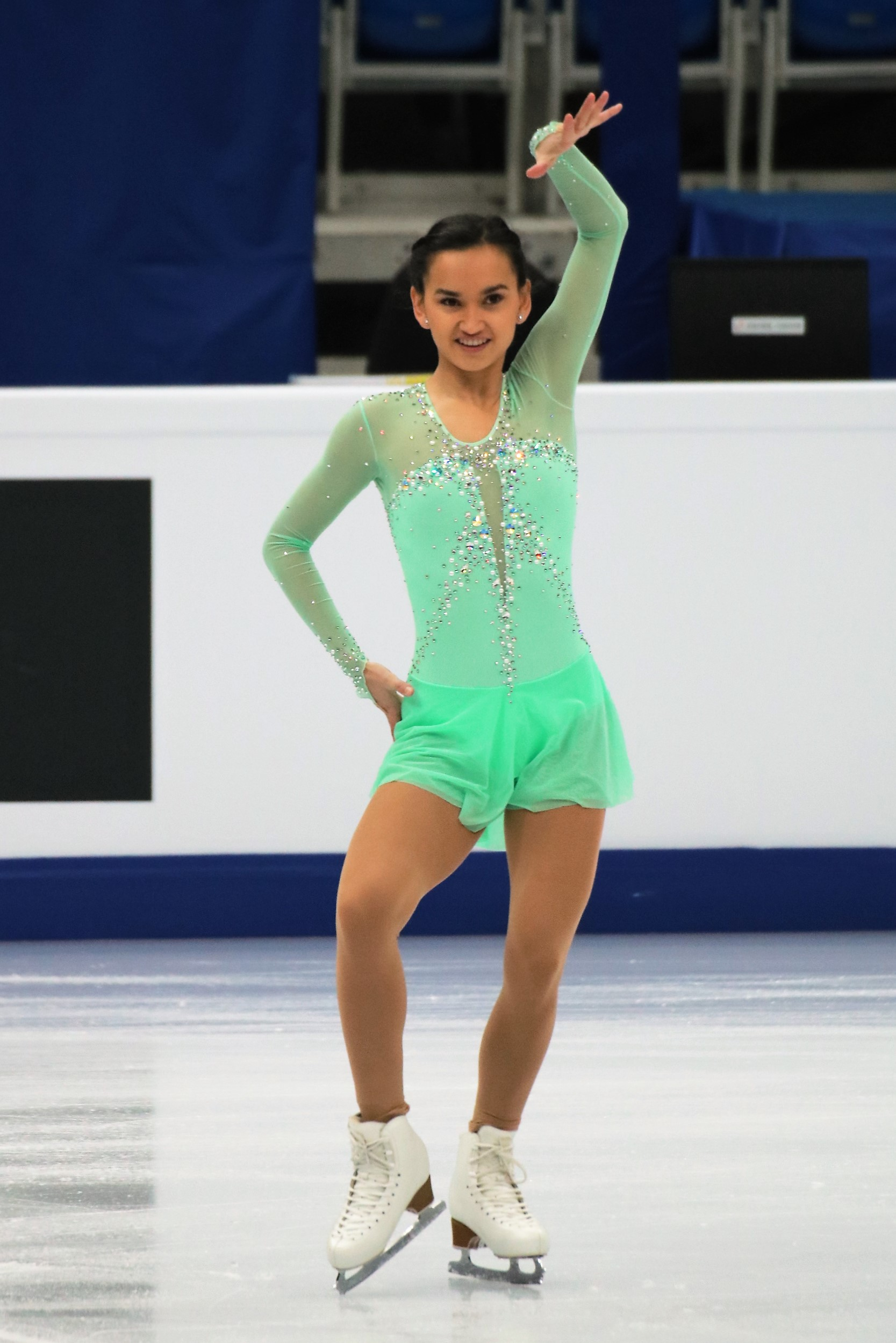
- Gjersem in 2018

Personal information
- Born: 6 January 1994 (age 32) Hønefoss, Norway
- Home town: Malmö, Sweden
- Height: 1.58 m (5 ft 2 in)

Figure skating career
- Country: Norway
- Coach: Ela Magnusson; Laco Vince
- Skating club: Asker FSC
- Began skating: 2002
- Retired: 4 June 2018

Anne Line Gjersem (born 6 January 1994) is a Norwegian retired figure skater. She is the 2015 Nordic silver medalist, the 2015 Denkova-Staviski Cup bronze medalist, and a three-time Norwegian national champion. She represented Norway at the 2014 Winter Olympics and has reached the free skate at six ISU Championships.

== Personal life ==
Anne Line Gjersem was born together with a twin sister, Camilla, on 6 January 1994 in Hønefoss, Norway. Their mother, Perlina Bangug, is a Filipina from Ilagan, Isabela, and their father, Petter Gjersem, a Norwegian from Raufoss. She studied information and communication technologies at Lund University.

She married Lukas Helgesson, the brother of former Swedish figure skaters, Joshi and Viktoria Helgesson, in October 2022. Gjersem and Helgesson welcomed a daughter, Linnea, in 2023.

== Career ==
Gjersem began skating at the age of eight in Gjøvik. She debuted on the ISU Junior Grand Prix series in 2008. She appeared three times at the World Junior Championships — her best result was 26th in 2010.

Gjersem made her senior ISU Championship debut at the 2011 European Championships and finished 25th. In October 2012, she ruptured a groin muscle, causing her to withdraw from the Warsaw Cup. In 2013, she qualified for her second European Championships, where she finished 22nd, and for her first World Championships, where she placed 32nd.

=== 2013–14 season: Sochi Olympics ===
The Nebelhorn Trophy in September 2013 was the final qualifying opportunity for countries which had not already earned a spot in a figure skating event at the 2014 Winter Olympics. By placing seventh, Gjersem earned a ladies' entry for Norway. In October 2013, she sustained a thigh injury at the International Cup of Nice. In January 2014, she came in 19th at the 2014 European Championships in Budapest.

In February 2014, Gjersem competed in the Winter Olympics in Sochi, Russia, becoming the first Norwegian Olympian in figure skating since 1964. With a placement of 24th in the short program, she qualified for the free skate, where she placed 22nd, and finished 23rd overall. In March, she advanced to the free skate at the 2014 World Championships in Saitama, Japan and finished 22nd.

=== 2014–15 season ===
In 2014–15, Gjersem competed at her first senior Grand Prix assignments, placing 11th at 2014 Cup of China and 12th at 2014 NHK Trophy. In January she became the Norwegian national champion, after placing 2nd in the short program behind her twin sister. Gjersem won the silver medal at the 2015 Nordic Championships. She placed 17th at the 2015 World Championships, the best result for a Norwegian ladies' skater since the 1940s.

=== 2015–16 season ===
Gjersem started the 2015–16 season by placing 8th at the 2015 Finlandia Trophy. She won the bronze medal at the 2015 Denkova-Staviski Cup with a new personal best score. She became the Norwegian national champion for the 4th time, again finishing ahead of her twin sister. At the 2016 European Championships Gjersem placed 14th in the short program, and 17th in the free program and overall.

=== 2016–17 season ===
Gjersem sustained a shoulder injury in May 2016 and a knee injury in the autumn. She returned to competition in January 2017 at the EDU Sport Trophy in Romania, where she was the only senior skater. She did not compete at the 2017 Norwegian Championships, but placed 10th at the 2017 Toruń Cup the same weekend. She placed 24th at the 2017 Europeans in Ostrava, and 34th at the 2017 Worlds in Helsinki.

=== 2017–18 season ===
Gjersem started the season with a 16th-place finish at the 2017 CS Lombardia Trophy and at the 2017 CS Nebelhorn Trophy. She would go on to win the bronze medal at the 2017 Cup of Tyrol and finish 6th at the 2017 Santa Claus Cup. At the 2018 European Championships in Moscow, Gjersem would finish 18th. Although she competed in the short program at the 2018 Challenge Cup, she withdrew from the event prior to the free skate. Gjersem closed the season by finishing 33rd at the 2018 World Championships in Milan.

She announced her retirement from competitive figure skating in June 2018.

== Programs ==
Season	Short program	Free skating
2017–2018	Angel by the Wings by Sia	Experience by Ludovico Einaudi; Circles by Greta Svabo Bech
2016–2017	Smile (Charlie Chaplin song) performed by Martina McBride	Manhã de Carnaval (from Black Orpheus) by Luiz Bonfá
2015–2016	Fly by Celine Dion choreo. by Michael Huth	Stormy Weather by Etta James choreo. by Catarina Lindgren
2014–2015	Fly by Celine Dion choreo. by Michael Huth	Un ange passe by Alain Lefevre
2013–2014	Maria and the Violin's String by Ashram	West Side Story by Leonard Bernstein
2012–2013	Hey Pachuco (from The Mask)	Danse Macabre by Camille Saint-Saëns
2011–2012	Hey Pachuco (from The Mask)	Xotica by René Dupéré
2010–2011	Hey Pachuco (from The Mask)	Morning to Morning by David Foster
2009–2010	Rhapsody in Rock V by Robert Wells	Morning to Morning by David Foster
2008–2009	Rhapsody in Rock V by Robert Wells	The Last Emperor

== Competitive highlights ==
GP: Grand Prix; CS: Challenger Series; JGP: Junior Grand Prix

International
Event	08–09	09–10	10–11	11–12	12–13	13–14	14–15	15–16	16–17	17–18
Olympics						23rd				
Worlds					32nd	22nd	17th	26th	34th	33rd
Europeans			25th		22nd	19th		17th	24th	18th
GP Cup of China							11th			
GP NHK Trophy							12th			
CS Denkova-Staviski								3rd		
CS Golden Spin							9th	10th		
CS Finlandia								8th		
CS Lombardia										16th
CS Nebelhorn										16th
Int. Challenge Cup				14th	4th				5th	WD
Crystal Skate			1st							
Cup of Nice						24th				
Cup of Tyrol										3rd
EDU Trophy									1st	
Egna Spring Trophy				7th						
Golden Spin			7th	8th						
Nebelhorn						7th				
New Year's Cup					11th					
Nordics			4th	6th	6th		2nd	6th	5th	
NRW Trophy					13th					
Santa Claus Cup										6th
Toruń Cup									10th	
Warsaw Cup					WD					
Winter Universiade							12th			
International: Junior
Junior Worlds	33rd	26th	33rd							
JGP Croatia		16th								
JGP France			14th							
JGP Germany			15th		14th					
JGP Hungary		12th								
JGP Spain	16th									
JGP Turkey					10th					
JGP U.K.	12th									
EYOF	3rd									
Nordics	3rd J	4th								
Skate Celje		1st								
Warsaw Cup		3rd								
National
Norwegian Champ.			1st	3rd			1st	1st		
J = Junior level; WD = Withdrew
