= Berit Unn Johansen =

Norwegian figure skater

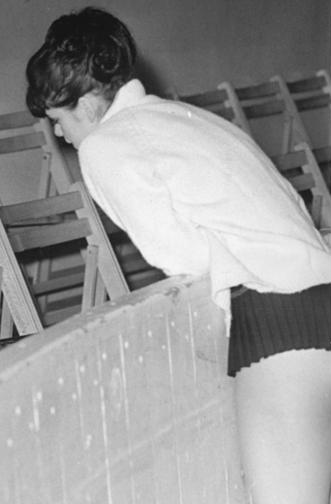
- Berit Unn Johansen

Personal information
- Nationality: Norwegian
- Born: 18 July 1947

Sport
- Sport: Figure skating

Berit Unn Sandvik Johansen (born 18 July 1947) is a Norwegian figure skater. She became Norwegian champion in 1964. She competed at the Winter Olympics in 1964.

== Results ==
Event	1961	1962	1963	1964	1965
Winter Olympic Games				30th	
Nordic Championships	2nd	3rd		2nd	
Norwegian Championships				1st	2nd
