= Madeleine Daleng =

Norwegian figure skater (born 1986)

Personal information
- Born: 30 May 1986 (age 40)
- Height: 1.64 m (5 ft 5 in)

Figure skating career
- Country: Norway
- Coach: Susanne Lindholm
- Skating club: Oslo Idrettslag
- Retired: 2006

Madeleine Daleng (born 30 May 1986, in Oslo) is a Norwegian former competitive figure skater. She is a four-time Norwegian national champion (2003, 2004, 2005, 2006). She placed 25th at the 2002 World Junior Figure Skating Championships.
