= Anne Karin Dehle =

Norwegian figure skater (born 1942)

Personal information
- Born: 30 July 1942 (age 83) Oslo, Norway

Figure skating career
- Country: Norway
- Skating club: Oslo SK
- Retired: 1971

Anne Karin Dehle (born 30 July 1942) is a Norwegian former figure skater who competed in the 1950s and 1960s. She became a five-time Nordic champion and a nine-time Norwegian national champion (1958, 1960–1963, 1965–1967, 1969). She competed at the 1964 Winter Olympics, two World Championships, and seven European Championships.

== Results ==
International
Event	1957	1958	1959	1960	1961	1962	1963	1964	1965	1966	1967	1968	1969	1970	1971
Winter Olympics								28th							
World Champ.		28th					22nd								
European Champ.	23rd		23rd		25th		14th	WD	WD	16th					
Nordics	3rd	2nd	1st	1st	1st	1st		3rd	2nd	2nd		1st		3rd	
National
Norwegian Champ.	2nd	1st	2nd	1st	1st	1st	1st		1st	1st	1st	2nd	1st		2nd
WD = Withdrew
