= Allan Fjeldheim =

Norwegian pair skater (1918–1995)

Personal information
- Born: 3 July 1918 Oslo, Norway
- Died: 29 March 1995 (aged 76) Oslo

Sport
- Sport: Figure skating
- Club: Oslo SK

Allan Normann Fjeldheim (31 July 1918 – 29 March 1995) was a Norwegian pair skater. He competed at the 1948 Winter Olympics, where he placed 10th with partner Margot Walle. He was the Norwegian pairs champion in 1939, 1946, 1947, 1948 and 1949.

== Results ==
(with Bergljot Sandvik)

Event	1939
Norwegian Championships	1st

(with Margot Walle)

Event	1946	1947	1948	1949
Winter Olympic Games			10th	
World Championships		9th		
European Championships				7th
Nordic Championships				1st
Norwegian Championships	1st	1st	1st	1st
