= Bjørg Skjælaaen =

Norwegian figure skater (1933–2019)

Bjørg Skjælaaen (6 September 1933 – 11 January 2019) was a Norwegian pair skater. She competed at the 1952 Winter Olympics in Oslo, where she placed 13th with partner Reidar Børjeson. She was Norwegian pairs champion in 1951 and 1952, with partner Børjeson, and in 1953, 1954 and 1955 together with partner Johannes Thorsen.

== Results ==
(with Reidar Børjeson)

Event	1951	1952
Winter Olympic Games		13th
Norwegian Championships	1st	1st

(with Johannes Thorsen)

Event	1953	1954	1955
World Championships		9th	
Nordic Championships	2nd	2nd	1st
Norwegian Championships	1st	1st	1st
