= Reidar Børjeson =

Norwegian figure skater (1931–2011)

Reidar Kristoffer Børjeson (2 April 1931 – 5 September 2011) was a Norwegian figure skater. He competed at the 1952 Winter Olympics in Oslo.

He was Norwegian champion in pairs in 1956, 1957, 1958 and 1959 together with partner Ingeborg Nilsson.

== Results ==
=== Pairs ===
(with Bjørg Skjælaaen)

Event	1951	1952
Winter Olympic Games		13th
Norwegian Championships	1st	1st

(with Nilsson)

Event	1956	1957	1958	1959
World Championships			15th	
Norwegian Championships	1st	1st	1st	1st
