= Ingrid Gulbrandsen =

Norwegian figure skater (1899–1975)

Ingrid Halvarda Gulbrandsen (11 September 1899 – 3 November 1975) was a Norwegian figure skater. She competed at the 1920 Summer Olympics in Antwerp, where she placed sixth. She was Norwegian champion in 1924.

== Results ==
Event	1920	1921	1922	1923	1924
Olympic Games	6th				
Nordic Championships		2nd			
Norwegian Championships					1st
