= Alexia Bryn =

Norwegian figure skater (1889–1983)

Personal information
- Full name: Alexia Marie Bryn-Schøien
- Born: Alexia Marie Bryn; 24 March 1889 Oslo, Norway
- Died: 19 July 1983 (aged 94) Oslo, Norway

Figure skating career
- Country: Norway
- Retired: 1923
Medal record
Pairs Figure skating
Representing Norway
Olympic Games
Silver medal – second place	1920 Antwerp	Pairs
World Championships
Silver medal – second place	1923 Oslo	Pairs
Bronze medal – third place	1912 Manchester	Pairs

Alexia Marie Bryn (also credited as Schøien and Bryn-Schøien; 24 March 1889 – 19 July 1983) was a Norwegian pair skater. She competed with Yngvar Bryn. They won silver medals at the 1920 Summer Olympics and at the 1923 World Figure Skating Championships, as well as the bronze at the 1912 Worlds.

== Competitive highlights ==
Pairs with (Yngvar Bryn)

Event	1908	1909	1910	1911	1912	1913	1914	1919	1920	1921	1922	1923
Winter Olympics									2nd			
World Championships				5th	3rd	4th	5th				5th	2nd
Nordic										2nd	1st	
Norwegian	1st	1st	1st	1st	1st	1st		1st	1st	1st	1st	

== Sources ==
- "Skatabase: 1920 Olympics". Archived from the original on 29 September 2007.
- "Skatabase: 1910s Worlds Pairs Results". Archived from the original on 27 September 2007.
- "Skatabase: 1920s Worlds Pairs Results". Archived from the original on 29 September 2007.
