= Erle Harstad =

Norwegian figure skater

Personal information
- Full name: Erle Bjoland Harstad
- Born: 6 August 1990 (age 36) Bærum
- Home town: Asker
- Height: 1.65 m (5 ft 5 in)

Figure skating career
- Country: Norway
- Coach: Berit Steigedal
- Skating club: Asker Kunstløpklubb

Erle Bjoland Harstad (born 6 August 1990) is a Norwegian figure skater. She is the 2008, 2009 and 2010 Norwegian national champion. She has participated three times at the European Figure Skating Championships.

== Personal life ==
Erle Bjoland Harstad was born in Bærum, Norway. She has two older sisters, five and six years older than her, who both skated.

== Career ==
Harstad began skating at the age of six. She was eleven when she landed her first triple jump, a triple toe loop. She was coached by Berit Steigedal in Asker, Norway, during the high season. She trained in Oberstdorf, Germany, and Tønsberg, Norway during the low season.

Harstad represented Norway three times at the European Figure Skating Championships. She placed 31st 2008, and 29th in both 2009 and 2010. She has competed at the Junior Grand Prix series five seasons, her best placement being 10th place in Bulgaria in 2008.

== Programs ==
Season	Short program	Free skating
2009–2010	Baghdad by Jesse Cook	Blues for Narada by Gary Moore
2008–2009	Havanna; Latin Medley	Blues for Narada by Gary Moore
2007–2008	Havanna; Latin Medley	Bohemian Rhapsody by Queen

== Competitive highlights ==
International
Event	2004–05	2005–06	2006–07	2007–08	2008–09	2009–10
Europeans				31st	29th	29th
Cup of Nice						26th
Nordics	19th J.	15th J.	12th J.	7th J.	6th	10th
Triglav Trophy					8th	
International: Junior
Junior Worlds		23rd QR		42nd		
JGP Belarus					19th	
JGP Bulgaria				10th		
JGP Estonia				13th		
JGP Germany						23rd
JGP Hungary			16th			
JGP Mexico					21st	
JGP Norway			23rd			
JGP Poland		29th				
Mladost Trophy			1st J.			
EYOF			15th J.			
Warsaw Cup	5th J.					7th J.
Copenhagen	18th J.			4th		
National
Norwegian	2nd J.	1st J.	1st J.	1st	1st	1st
J. = Junior level; JGP = Junior Grand Prix; QR = Qualifying round
