= Margot Walle =

Norwegian figure skater

Margot Sofie Walle (11 November 1921 – 26 February 1990) was a Norwegian pair skater. She competed at the 1948 Winter Olympics, where she placed 10th with partner Allan Fjeldheim. She was Norwegian pairs champion in 1946, 1947, 1948 and 1949.

== Results ==
(with Allan Fjeldheim)

| Event | 1946 | 1947 | 1948 | 1949 |
|---|---|---|---|---|
| Winter Olympic Games | | | 10th | |
| World Championships | | 9th | | |
| European Championships | | | | 7th |
| Nordic Championships | | | | 1st |
| Norwegian Championships | 1st | 1st | 1st | 1st |
