= Anine Rabe =

Norwegian figure skater

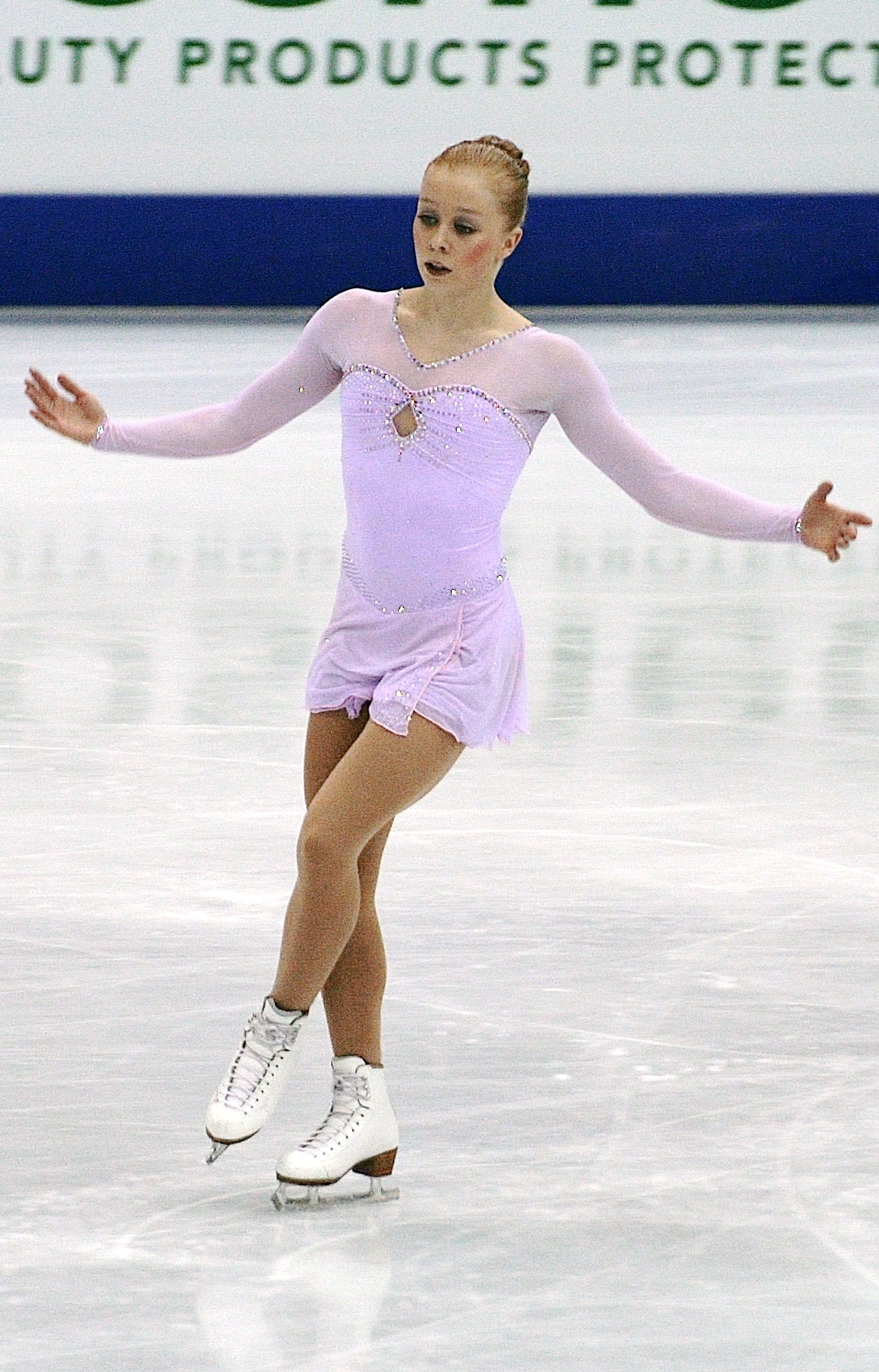
- Rabe in 2012

Personal information
- Born: 21 November 1992 (age 33) Tønsberg, Norway
- Home town: Trondheim
- Height: 1.60 m (5 ft 3 in)

Figure skating career
- Country: Norway
- Coach: Marek Chrolenko
- Skating club: Trondheim FSC
- Began skating: 2000
- Retired: 2015

Anine Rabe (born 21 November 1992) is a Norwegian former figure skater. She is a three-time silver medalist at the Norwegian Figure Skating Championships, 2012, 2013 and 2014. She placed 25th in the 2012 World Junior Figure Skating Championships and 42nd in the 2012 World Figure Skating Championships (preliminary round). She retired from competitive skating in 2015. Her younger sister, Thea Rabe is also a former figure skater and ice dancer.

== Programs ==
Season	Short program	Free skating
2013–15	Until the Last Moment by Yanni	Otoñal by Raúl Di Blasio
2012–13	Dragonheart by Randy Edelman	Otoñal by Raúl Di Blasio
2011–12	Dragonheart by Randy Edelman	Theme from Love Story (soundtrack) by Francis Lai
2010–11	Reflection performed by Vanessa-Mae	Theme from Love Story (soundtrack) by Francis Lai
2008–09	Winter from Four Seasons by A. Vivaldi	Anthem by Björn Ulvaeus; Chess by Benny Andersson

== Competitive highlights ==
CS: Challenger Series; JGP: Junior Grand Prix

International
Event	09-10	10-11	11-12	12–13	13–14	14–15
Worlds			42nd			
Junior Worlds			25th J.			
CS Volvo Open Cup				6th		16th
CS Finlandia Trophy						11th
Coupe du Printemps					2nd	
Crystal Skate				2nd		
Golden Spin					10th	
Merano Cup				8th		
Nordics	11th J.	3rd J.	5th	8th	11th	
Nepela Trophy			12th		9th	
Triglav Trophy	8th J.				10th	
International: Junior
JGP Latvia			24th			
JGP Great Britain		15th				
Cup of Nice	18th	7th				
Ice Challenge			14th			
NRW Trophy		9th				
Warsaw Cup	1st	4th	5th			
National
Norwegian Champ.	4th J.	3rd J.	2nd	2nd	2nd	
J. = Junior level
