= Per Jacobsen =

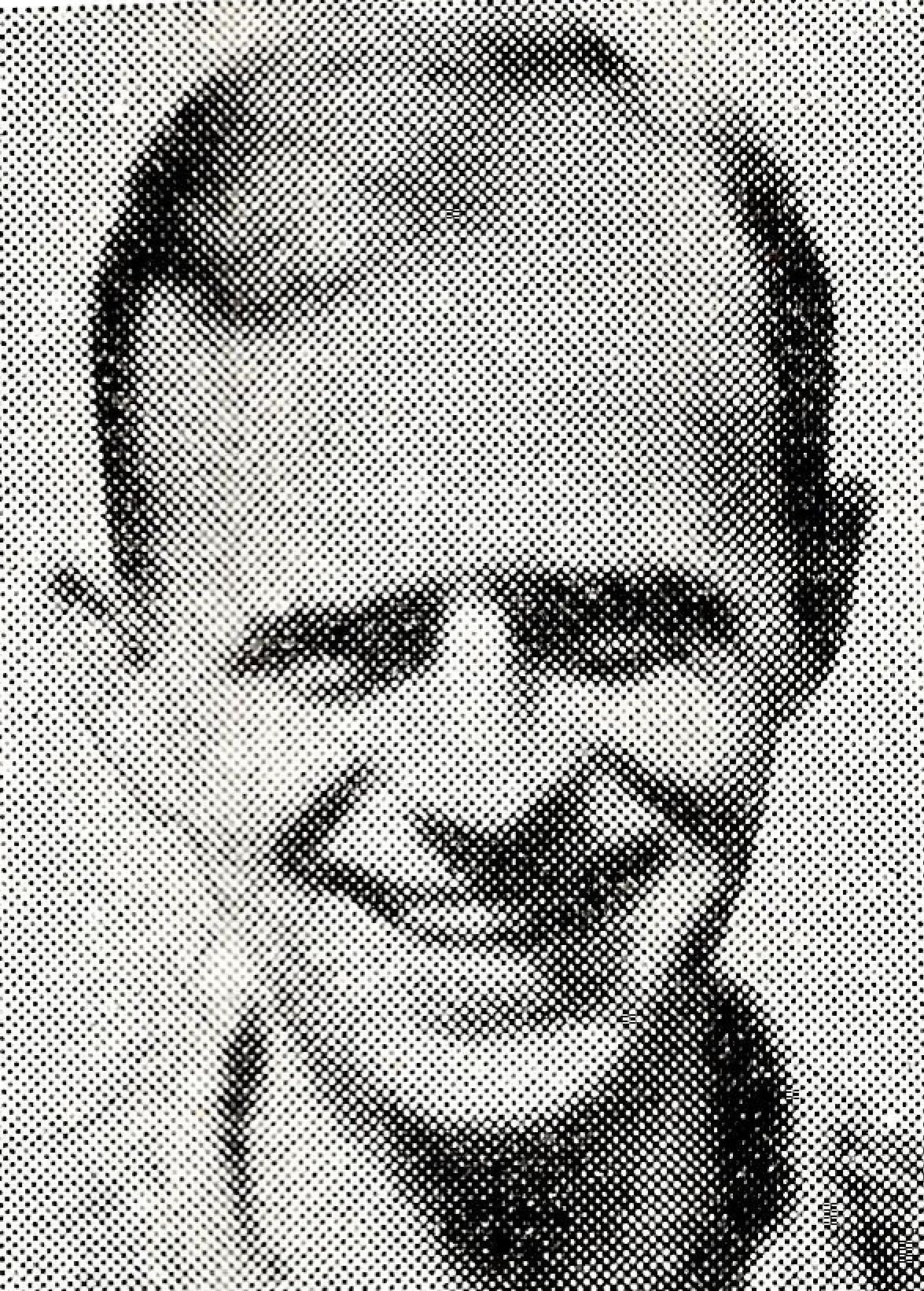
Per Jacobsen (1911–1944)

Per Jacobsen (23 March 1911 – 13 June 1944) was a Norwegian figure skater (national champion in 1931 and 1932), and a resistance member who was killed during World War II.

== Early and personal life ==
Jacobsen was born in Kristiania as the son of Sigval Jacobsen (1867–1928) and Agathe, née Backer Røed (1876–1925). His father hailed from Kristiania and his mother from Holmestrand.

Jacobsen studied economics and auditing.

He was Norwegian champion in figure skating in 1931, and again in 1932.

== World War II ==
During the Norwegian Campaign, Jacobsen fought for Norway in battles in the Oppland district. During the subsequent occupation of Norway by Nazi Germany, he became involved in the Norwegian resistance movement. Among others, he was a member during the brief existence of the group Skylark A, established by the Secret Intelligence Service in September 1940. He travelled from Oslo to Knut Haukelid's mountain cabin at Langesæ, where he informed Haukelid that Sverre Midtskau had returned from England, and asked him to join the group in Oslo. He played a central role when Max Manus escaped from custody at Ullevål Hospital in February 1941, by smuggling in the fishline which was used to pull up the rope used for descending, and organize car transport for the escape. After the Skylark A group was unveiled by the Nazi authorities, Jacobsen started working with underground newspapers, but was soon arrested. He spent time in prison at Åkebergveien from 18 March to 1 April 1941, for "having opposed a German decree". He was arrested for the second time on 18 June and incarcerated in Møllergata 19. He then sat at Grini concentration camp from 7 August 1942 to 29 July 1943. While incarcerated at Grini, Jacobsen took part in the prisoners' self-administration, and had a central position at the so-called Kammeret, which was under German supervision, but the labour was done by prisoners. He was shipped to Germany on 29 July 1943, and sent directly to the Nacht und Nebel camp Natzweiler in occupied France, where he died in June 1944.

In his memoir Det demrer en dag, Knut Haukelid described Jacobsen as the most indefatigable idealist he met during the early war years. In his post-war book Det vil helst gå godt, Max Manus described Jacobsen as a grand companion, an ardent idealist, and one of the silent heroes who undertook the biggest efforts.

== Results ==
Event	1928	1929	1930	1931	1932
Norwegian Championships	3rd	2nd	(2nd)	1st	1st
