= Yngvar Bryn =

Figure skater and athlete from Norway

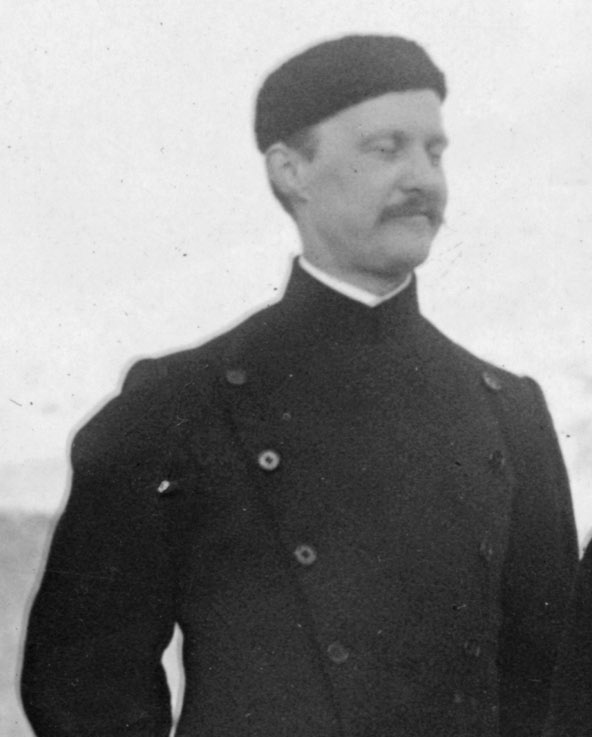

Personal information
- Born: 17 December 1881 Kristiansand, Sweden–Norway
- Died: 30 April 1947 (aged 65) Oslo, Norway

Figure skating career
- Country: Norway
- Retired: 1923
Medal record
Representing Norway
Pairs Figure skating
Olympic Games
| Silver medal – second place | 1920 Antwerp | Pairs |
World Championships
| Silver medal – second place | 1923 Oslo | Pairs |
| Bronze medal – third place | 1912 Manchester | Pairs |

Olympic medal record

Figure skating

Representing Norway
| Silver medal – second place | 1920 Antwerp | Pairs |

Yngvar Bryn (17 December 1881 – 30 April 1947) was a Norwegian track and field athlete and pairs figure skater who competed in the 1900 Summer Olympics in Paris, France, and in the 1920 Summer Olympics held in Antwerp, Belgium.

At just 18 years old, Bryn won two silver medals at the 1899 Norwegian Athletic Championships in the 100 metres and 500 metres races. In 1901 and 1902, he became the Norwegian Champion in the 500 metres. He also became the 100 metres Norwegian record holder in 1902 when he recorded at time of 11.1 seconds.

In 1900 he participated in the 200 metres competition and in the 400 metres competition. In both events, he was eliminated in the first round. As a track and field athlete Bryn was representing IK Tjalve. Bryn was elected president of the Norwegian Athletics Association in 1908 when aged just 26 years old, a position he held for the next three years.

As a pair skater, he competed with Alexia Bryn. They won silver medals at the 1920 Summer Olympics and at the 1923 World Figure Skating Championships, as well as the bronze at the 1912 Worlds. He is one of the oldest figure skating Olympic medalists.

In 1932, Bryn took part in his third Olympics, this time as a judge in both figure skating and speed skating during the Olympic Winter Games in Lake Placid. He chaired the Norwegian Skating Association from 1926 to 1927.

Bryn also studied philology at University of Oslo, and as well as all the sporting activities, he was also a high school teacher up to his death in 1947, when aged 65 years old.

== Results ==
Pairs with (Alexia Bryn)

| Event | 1908 | 1909 | 1910 | 1911 | 1912 | 1913 | 1914 | 1915 | 1916 | 1917 | 1918 | 1919 | 1920 | 1921 | 1922 | 1923 |
|---|---|---|---|---|---|---|---|---|---|---|---|---|---|---|---|---|
| Olympic Games | | | | | | | | | | | | | 2nd | | | |
| World Championships | | | | 5th | 3rd | 4th | 5th | | | | | | | | 5th | 2nd |
| Nordic Championships | | | | | | | | | | | | | | 2nd | 1st | |
| Norwegian Championships | 1st | 1st | 1st | 1st | 1st | 1st | | | | | | 1st | 1st | 1st | 1st | |

Sporting positions
| Preceded by Ivar Hellesnes | President of the Norwegian Skating Association; 1926–1927 | Succeeded by Anders Melteig |
