= Marit Henie =

Norwegian figure skater

Personal information
- Full name: Marit Henie Moe
- Born: 13 February 1925 Oslo, Norway
- Died: 4 November 2012 (aged 87)

Figure skating career
- Country: Norway
- Partner: Erling Bjerkhoel
- Skating club: Oslo IL

Marit Henie Moe (13 February 1925 – 4 November 2012) was a Norwegian figure skater who competed in single skating and pair skating; she was a six-time national champion in single skating and two-time champion in pair skating. She was a cousin of figure skater Sonja Henie, and her skating partner was Erling Bjerkhoel.

== Biography ==
Henie began skating in the early 1930s as a member of Oslo SK. In 1935, she went to London to train, and in 1936 she began training with Hans Gerschwiler. Maribel Vinson reported that she was good with compulsory figures and "very stiff" in her free skating. She was the 1936 Norwegian junior champion. Henie later switched to the club Oslo IL, and she began to compete pairs in 1940, when she won the senior national championships with Bjerkhoel. Her career was interrupted by the start of World War II.

After the war, Henie won six consecutive national titles from 1946 to 1951 in single skating, and she and Bjerkhoeld also won a second national title in 1950. She won two King's Cups.

Internationally, she competed at the 1947 World Figure Skating Championships, where she placed 11th in pairs with Bjerkhoel. Ulrich Salchow described them as having a "clean style" but criticized them for not having modern movements in their program. Henie also participated in the women's event at the 1948 Winter Olympics, where she placed 22nd. In 1950, she competed in the women's event at the Nordic Figure Skating Championships and placed third behind Gun Ericsson and Leena Pietilä.

Henie remained involved in skating after she finished her competitive career. She coached until 1972 and also helped the Norwegian Skating Association with work on a book commemorating the organization's 100th anniversary in 1993.

== Results ==
=== Ladies singles ===
Event	1946	1947	1948	1949	1950	1951
Winter Olympic Games			22nd			
Nordic Championships				1st	3rd	
Norwegian Championships	1st	1st	1st	1st	1st	1st

=== Pairs ===
(with Bjerkhoel)

Event	1940	1941	1942	1943	1944	1945	1946	1947	1948	1949	1950
World Championships								11th			
Norwegian Championships	1st										1st
