= Martinus Lørdahl =

Norwegian businessperson, multi sports competitor and sports administrator

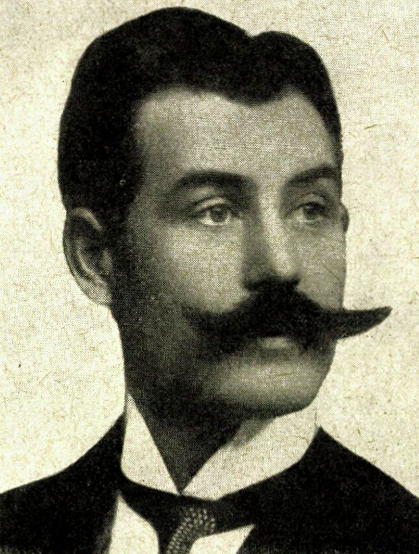
- Born: 28 July 1873; Hof, Vestfold, Norway
- Died: 2 April 1933 (aged 59); Oslo, Norway
- Occupation(s): Businessperson and sports administrator

Martinus Lørdahl (28 July 1873, in Hof, Vestfold – 2 April 1933, in Oslo) was a Norwegian businessperson, multi sports competitor and sports administrator.

He was active in several sports, in particular athletics, swimming and skating. He was among Norway's best racewalkers, and had several good results in speed skating, including placing second at the 1905 World Allround Speed Skating Championships. He co-founded the sports club Kristiania Idrætsforening in 1893, and participated in restarting Christiania Skøiteklub in 1898. He was a driving force in the construction of Bislett Stadium from 1908. He served as President of the Norwegian Swimming Federation from 1920 to 1923, and co-founded Oslo Idrettskrets.

A bust of Lørdahl, sculpted by Per Ung, was unveiled at Bislett Stadium in 2010.
