= Figure skating at the 1920 Summer Olympics =

Figure skating at the VII Summer Olympics
- Type: Olympic Games

Champions
- Men's singles: (Sweden) Gillis Grafström
- Ladies' singles: (Sweden) Magda Julin
- Pairs: (Finland) Ludowika Jakobsson / Walter Jakobsson
- Previous: 1908 Summer Olympics
- Next: 1924 Winter Olympics

Three figure skating events were contested at the 1920 Summer Olympics in Antwerp, but they were held in April 1920, four months before most of the other Olympic events at the 1920 Games. The figure skating competition took place at the Ice Palace of Antwerp.

Gillis Grafström of Sweden captured the first of three consecutive Olympic gold medals in the men's single event in 1920. Theresa Weld, who came in third place in the ladies' single event, was the first North American skater to win an Olympic medal. 1908 gold medalist Ulrich Salchow finished fourth. At age 44, bronze medalist Martin Stixrud is the oldest man to ever win an Olympic medal in an individual winter event.

Despite receiving no first place votes from the judges in the women's singles, Magda Julin of Sweden captured the gold on the strength of three second-place ordinals. She was three months pregnant at the time.

Bronze medalist Phyllis Johnson from the UK had captured the silver medal at the 1908 Olympics with a different partner.

== Medal summary ==
=== Medalists ===
Event	Gold	Silver	Bronze
Men's singles	Gillis Grafström; Sweden	Andreas Krogh; Norway	Martin Stixrud; Norway
Ladies' singles	Magda Mauroy-Julin; Sweden	Svea Norén; Sweden	Theresa Weld; United States
Pair skating	Ludowika Jakobsson and Walter Jakobsson; Finland	Alexia Bryn and Yngvar Bryn; Norway	Phyllis Johnson and Basil Williams; Great Britain

=== Medal table ===
Rank	Nation	Gold	Silver	Bronze	Total
1	Sweden	2	1	0	3
2	Finland	1	0	0	1
3	Norway	0	2	1	3
4	Great Britain	0	0	1	1
4	United States	0	0	1	1
Totals (5 entries)		3	3	3	9

== Participating nations ==
A total of 26 figure skaters, 14 men and 12 women, from eight nations competed at the Antwerp Games:

- Belgium (2)
- Finland (3)
- France (2)
- Great Britain (6)
- Norway (6)
- Sweden (4)
- Switzerland (1)
- United States (2)
