= Andreas Krogh =

Norwegian figure skater (1894–1964)

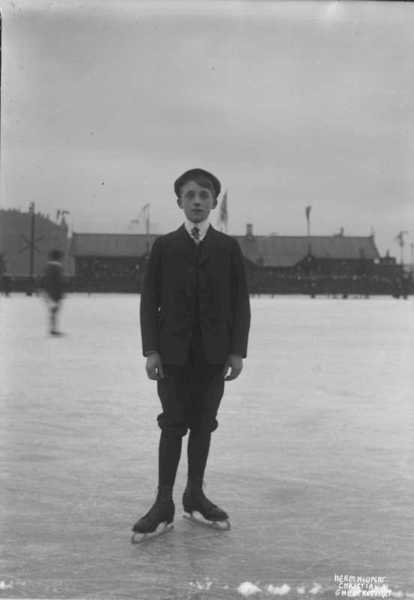
- Andreas Krogh at Bislett Stadion, Kristiania (later Oslo), 24 January 1909

Personal information
- Full name: Andreas Jens Krogh
- Born: 9 July 1894 Oslo
- Died: 26 April 1964 (aged 69) Oslo

Figure skating career
- Country: Norway
- Skating club: Oslo SK
Medal record
Representing Norway
Men's Figure skating
Olympic Games
Silver medal – second place	1920 Antwerp	Men's singles

Andreas Jens Krogh (9 July 1894 – 26 April 1964) was a Norwegian figure skater. He won the silver medal at the 1920 Summer Olympics.

== Results ==
=== Men's singles ===
Event	1910	1911	1912	1913	1914	1915	1918	1920	1935
Olympic Games								2nd	
European Championships				7th	2nd				
Norwegian Championships	3rd	3rd	1st	2nd	1st	1st	3rd		1st

=== Pairs ===
(with Astrid Nordsveen)

Event	1914
Norwegian Championships	1st
