= Martin Stixrud =

Norwegian figure skater (1876-1964)

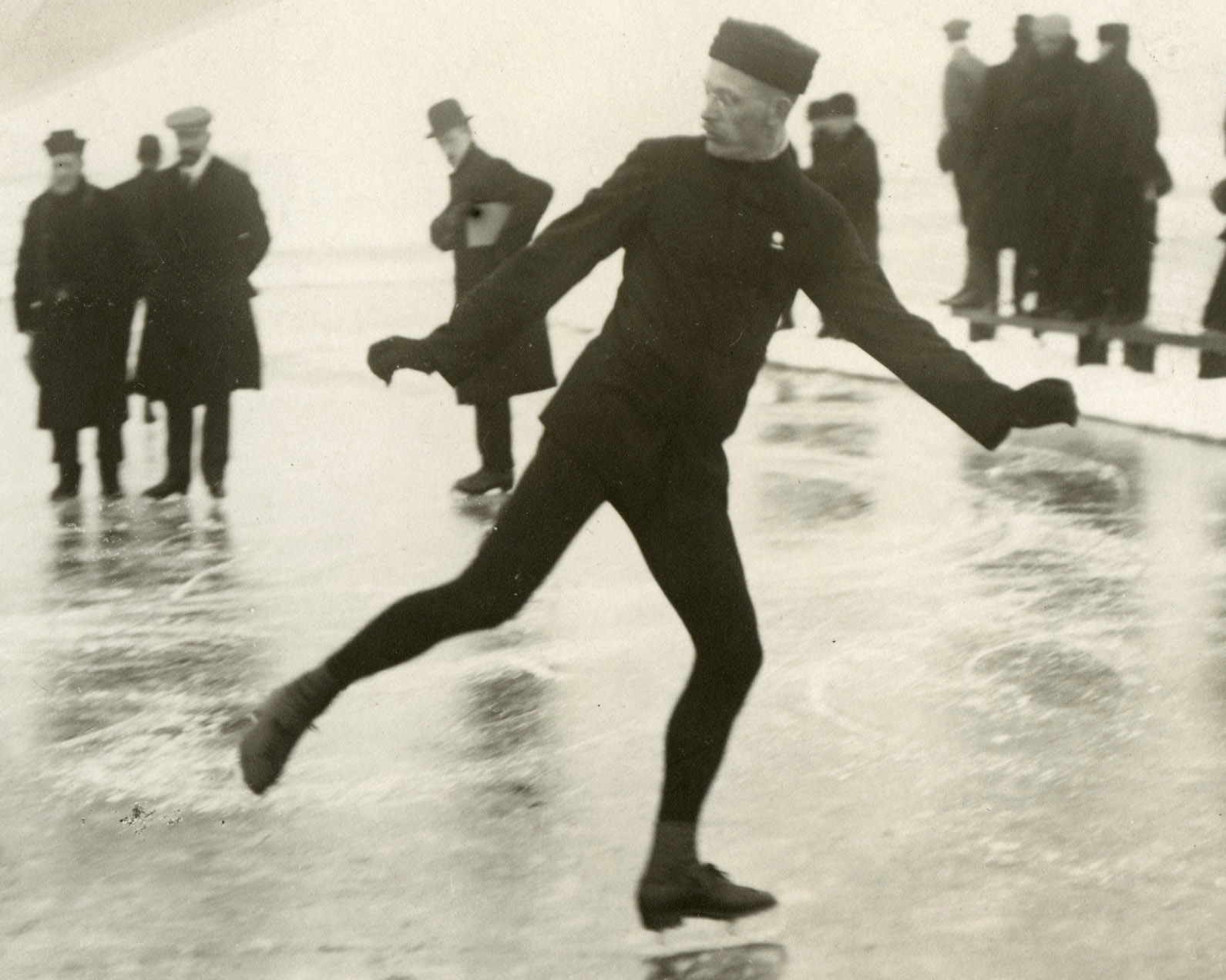

Personal information
- Full name: Martin Stixrud
- Born: 9 February 1876 Oslo
- Died: 8 January 1964 (aged 87) Oslo

Figure skating career
- Country: Norway
- Skating club: Oslo SK
Medal record
Men's figure skating
Representing Norway
Olympic Games
Bronze medal – third place	1920 Antwerp	Men's singles
European Championships
Silver medal – second place	1923 Oslo	Men's singles
Bronze medal – third place	1912 Stockholm	Men's singles

Martin Stixrud (9 February 1876 – 8 January 1964) was a Norwegian figure skater. He was the 1920 Summer Olympics bronze medalist, 1923 European silver medalist, and 1912 European bronze medalist.

He was 44 years old when he won the Olympic bronze medal. He is the second oldest person ever to win an Olympic medal in an individual winter sport.

He later coached Sonja Henie. He was born and died in Oslo.

He studied in Oslo together with Sonja Henie and Erna Andersen.

== Results ==
Event	1910	1911	1912	1913	1914	1915	1916	1917	1918	1919	1920	1921	1922	1923	1924
Summer Olympic Games											3rd				
World Championships		6th			11th								4th		7th
European Championships	5th		3rd	6th									5th	2nd	
Nordic Championships										1st	2nd	1st			
Norwegian Championships				1st			1st	1st	1st	1st	1st	1st	1st	1st	1st
