= Basil Williams (figure skater) =

British figure skater

Personal information
- Born: 11 March 1891
- Died: 1951 (aged 59–60)

Figure skating career
- Country: United Kingdom
Medal record
Representing United Kingdom
Pairs Figure skating
Olympic Games
Bronze medal – third place	1920 Antwerp	Pairs

Basil Williams (11 March 1891 – 1951) was a British single skater and pair skater. With partner Phyllis Johnson, he won the bronze medal at the 1920 Summer Olympics. Before teaming up with Johnson, he competed with Enid Harrison. They placed 6th at the 1912 World Figure Skating Championships. He also competed as a single skater at the 1920 Olympics, placing 7th.

== Results ==
(with Phyllis Johnson)

Event	1920
Winter Olympic Games	3rd
