= Kaja Hanevold =

Norwegian figure skater (born 1980)

Personal information
- Born: 15 May 1980 (age 46) Asker, Norway
- Height: 1.75 m (5 ft 9 in)

Figure skating career
- Country: Norway
- Skating club: Asker Kunstlopklubb
- Began skating: 1987
- Retired: 2002

Kaja Hanevold (born 15 May 1980) is a Norwegian former competitive figure skater who skates professionally. She is a five-time Norwegian national champion and qualified to the free skate at three ISU Championships – 1996 Junior Worlds in Brisbane, Australia; 1999 Europeans in Prague, Czech Republic; and 2000 Europeans in Vienna, Austria.

Hanevold retired from competitive figure skating following the 2001–2002 season. She has skated professionally on the Norwegian series of Dancing on Ice.

== Programs ==
Season	Short program	Free skating
2001–2002	Blues for Nerada by Gary Moore	Tuptim (from Anna and the King) by George Fenton
2000–2001	Havana by Dave Grusin	Tuptim (from Anna and the King) by George Fenton

== Results ==
International
Event	94–95	95–96	96–97	97–98	98–99	99–00	00–01	01–02
Worlds			39th		36th	25th		
Europeans	29th	30th	30th	26th	16th	24th	WD	
Golden Spin						17th		
Nebelhorn Trophy			20th			21st		21st
Nepela Memorial								19th
Nordics				6th	7th	4th	6th	
Piruetten					11th			
Schäfer Memorial							WD	
DSU Cup						3rd		
International: Junior
Junior Worlds		24th						
JGP Bulgaria					15th			
National
Norwegian Champ.	1st	1st	1st	1st	WD		1st	
JGP = Junior Grand Prix; WD = Withdrew
