= International figure skating =

Sport with participants across the world

Figure skating is a sport with participants across the world. Originally based in North America and Europe, the sport has experienced a major expansion in the countries of East Asia. The international governing body of the sport is the International Skating Union (ISU). Only those nations which are members of the International Skating Union are allowed to compete in the figure skating events in the Olympic Games.

== Africa (3) ==
Country	ISU member	Governing body	Official site	Skaters	Additional
Egypt	Yes	Ice Skate Egypt	https://iceskateegypt.com/		
Morocco	Yes	Association of Moroccan Ice Sports			
South Africa	Yes	South African Figure Skating Association	http://www.safsa.org.za/	Category	

== Americas (9) ==
Country	ISU member	Governing body	Official site	Skaters	Additional
Argentina	Yes	Federación Argentina de Patinaje Sobre Hielo	http://www.faph.org/	Category	
Brazil	Yes	Brazilian Ice Sports Federation	http://www.cbdg.org.br/	Category	
Canada	Yes	Skate Canada	http://www.skatecanada.ca/en/	Category	
Chile	Yes	Chilean National Figure Skating Federation	http://www.patinajesobrehielochile.com		
Ecuador	Yes	Ecuadorian Skating Federation	https://ecuatorianadepatinaje.com/		
Mexico	Yes	Mexican Skating Federation		Category	
Peru	Yes	Peruvian Ice Skating Federation			
Puerto Rico	No	Puerto Rico Skating Federation		Category	
United States	Yes	U.S. Figure Skating	http://www.usfigureskating.org/	Category	

== Asia (21) ==
Country	ISU member	Governing body	Official site	Skaters	Additional
Cambodia	Yes	Cambodia Ice Skating Federation			
China	Yes	Chinese Figure Skating Association	https://web.archive.org/web/20190507101347/http://chnfs.org/	Category	Macau – Macau Skating Union
Hong Kong	Yes	Hong Kong Skating Union	https://hksu.org/	Category	
India	Yes	Ice Skating Association of India	https://www.iceskatingindia.in/	Category	
Indonesia	Yes	Federasi Ice Skating Indonesia	https://fisid.org/	Category	
Japan	Yes	Japan Skating Federation	http://www.skatingjapan.or.jp/	Category	
Kazakhstan	Yes	National Skating Federation of the Republic of Kazakhstan	https://skating.kz/	Category	
Kyrgyzstan	Yes	Skating Federation of the Kyrgyz Republic			
Malaysia	Yes	Ice Skating Association of Malaysia	https://www.isam.org.my/	Category	
Mongolia	Yes	Skating Union of Mongolia			
North Korea	Yes	Skating Association of the Democratic People's Republic of Korea		Category	
Pakistan	No	Pakistan Skating Association			
Philippines	Yes	Philippine Skating Union	https://www.philippineskating.org/	Category	
Singapore	Yes	Singapore Ice Skating Association	https://www.sisa.org.sg/	Category	
South Korea	Yes	Korea Skating Union	http://skating.or.kr/	Category	
Chinese Taipei	Yes	Chinese Taipei Skating Union	https://ctsu.com.tw/	Category	
Thailand	Yes	Figure and Speed Skating Association of Thailand	https://www.fsat.or.th/	Category	
Turkmenistan	Yes	National Center of Turkmenistan for Winter Sport			
United Arab Emirates	Yes	United Arab Emirates Ice Sports Federation	http://www.uaeisf.com/	Category	
Uzbekistan	Yes	Winter Sports Association of Uzbekistan		Category	
Vietnam	Yes	Skating Federation of Vietnam			

== Europe (48) ==
Some countries within Asia are listed here, as they may compete at the European Championships.

Country	ISU member	Governing body	Official site	Skaters	Additional
Andorra	Yes	Andorran Federation of Ice Sports	https://web.archive.org/web/20130118204407/http://www.faeg.org/	Category	
Armenia	Yes	Figure Skating Federation of Armenia		Category	
Austria	Yes	Österreichischer Eiskunstlauf Verband	http://www.skateaustria.com/	Category	
Azerbaijan	Yes	The Skating Federation of Azerbaijan Republic		Category	
Belarus	Yes	Skating Union of Belarus		Category	
Belgium	Yes	Federation Royale Belge de Patinage Artistique	http://www.kbsf.be/	Category	
Bosnia and Herzegovina	Yes	Skating Federation of Bosnia & Herzegovina	http://www.ksbih.ba/	Category	
Bulgaria	Yes	Bulgarian Skating Federation		Category	
Croatia	Yes	Croatia Skating Federation	http://www.croskate.hr/	Category	
Cyprus	Yes	Cyprus Ice Skating Federation		Category	
Czech Republic	Yes	Czech Figure Skating Association	http://www.czechskating.org/	Category	
Denmark	Yes	Danske Skøjte Union	http://www.danskate.dk/	Category	
Estonia	Yes	Estonian Skating Union		Category	
Finland	Yes	Finnish Figure Skating Association	http://www.stll.fi/	Category	
France	Yes	French Federation of Ice Sports	http://www.ffsg.org	Category	
Georgia	Yes	Georgian Figure Skating Association		Category	
Germany	Yes	German Ice Skating Union	http://www.eislauf-union.de/	Category	
Gibraltar	No	Gibraltar Skating Association			
Greece	Yes	Hellenic Winter Sports Federation	http://www.hisf.gr/	Category	
Hungary	Yes	Hungarian National Skating Federation	http://www.moksz.hu/	Category	
Iceland	Yes	Icelandic Skating Association	http://www.skautasamband.is/	Category	
Republic of Ireland	Yes	Ice Skating Association of Ireland	http://isai.ie/	Category	
Israel	Yes	Israel Ice Skating Federation	https://web.archive.org/web/20070930122747/http://www.israel-isf.org/	Category	
Italy	Yes	Italian Ice Sports Federation	http://www.fisg.it/	Category	
Latvia	Yes	Latvian Skating Association	http://www.skatelatvia.lv/	Category	
Liechtenstein	Yes	Liechtensteinian Skating Association		Category	
Lithuania	Yes	Lithuanian Skating Federation		Category	
Luxembourg	Yes	Luxembourgian Union of Skating		Category	
Moldova	Yes	Figure Skating Federation of the Republic of Moldova			
Monaco	Yes	Federation Monegasque de Patinage		Category	
Montenegro	No	Skating Association Of Montenegro		Category	
Netherlands	Yes	Royal Dutch Skating Federation	http://knsb.nl/	Category	
North Macedonia	Yes	Skating Federation of North Macedonia			
Norway	Yes	Norwegian Skating Association	http://www.skoyteforbundet.no/	Category	
Poland	Yes	Polish Figure Skating Association	http://www.pfsa.com.pl/	Category	
Portugal	Yes	Portuguese Winter Sports Federation	http://www.fpp.pt/	Category	
Romania	Yes	Romanian Skating Federation	https://web.archive.org/web/20130325011935/http://www.frp.ro/	Category	
Russia	Yes	Figure Skating Federation of Russia	http://fsrussia.ru/	Category	
San Marino	No	Federazione San Marin Sport del Ghiaccio			
Serbia	Yes	Serbian Skating Association	http://www.klizackisavezsrbije.rs/	Category	
Slovakia	Yes	Slovak Figure Skating Association	http://www.kraso.sk/	Category	
Slovenia	Yes	Slovene Skating Union	http://www.drsalna-zveza.si/	Category	
Spain	Yes	Spanish Ice Sports Federation	http://www.fedhielo.com/	Category	
Sweden	Yes	Svenska Konståkningsförbundet	http://www.skatesweden.se	Category	
Switzerland	Yes	Schweizer Eislauf-Verband	http://www.swissiceskating.ch/	Category	
Turkey	Yes	Turkish Ice Skating Federation	http://www.buzpateni.org.tr/	Category	
Ukraine	Yes	Ukrainian Figure Skating Federation	http://www.ufsf.com.ua/	Category	
United Kingdom	Yes	British Ice Skating	http://www.iceskating.org.uk	Category	Northern Ireland – The Northern Ireland Ice Skating Federation; Scotland – Skate Scotland; Wales – Welsh Ice Skating Association

== Oceania (2) ==
Country	ISU member	Governing body	Official site	Skaters	Additional
Australia	Yes	Ice Skating Australia	http://www.isa.org.au/	Category	State associations: Australian Capital Territory; New South Wales; Queensland; South Australia; Victoria; Western Australia; Tasmania
New Zealand	Yes	New Zealand Ice Skating Association	http://www.nzifsa.org.nz/	Category	

== History ==
=== In Armenia ===
Armenia hosts the ISU Junior Grand Prix, an international figure skating competition, organized by the Figure Skating Federation of Armenia. Medals may be awarded in the disciplines of men's singles, ladies' singles, pair skating, and ice dancing.

=== In Australia ===
Brisbane hosted the World Junior Championships in 1988 and 1996. Stephanie Zhang (ladies' bronze, 2000) and Ekaterina Alexandrovskaya / Harley Windsor (pairs gold in 2016) have won ISU Junior Grand Prix medals for Australia. Alexandrovskaya/Windsor also won Australia's first gold medal at an ISU Championship, at the 2017 World Junior Figure Skating Championships.

Team Evolution from Brisbane were awarded a gold medal in synchronized skating at the 2020 Zagreb Snowflakes Trophy.

=== In Austria ===
In 1897, Gustav Hügel became the first Austrian to win a World title in figure skating. In 1922, Herma Szabo won Austria's first World ladies' title. She would go on to win the next four World Championships.

Willy Böckl won four consecutive World titles (1925–28). In the 1930s, Karl Schäfer (1930–36) and Felix Kaspar (1937–38) produced a nine-year streak of World men's titles for Austria. Following World War II, Austrian competitors were initially barred from international events. They returned to the World Championships in 1948.

In the 1960s, Austria experienced a resurgence led by Emmerich Danzer, a three-time World champion (1966–68), and Wolfgang Schwarz, the 1968 Olympic champion.

Vienna (1907, 1913, 1923, 1925, 1937, 1955, 1967, 1979) is the only city within the modern borders of Austria to host the World Championships.

=== In Azerbaijan ===
In 1990, an ice rink opened at Baku's Heydar Aliyev Sports and Concert Complex but within a few years it was unable to maintain the ice surface due to a poor-quality cooling system. A 2019 report stated that Azerbaijan still had no functioning ice rink. As a result, the country is represented by foreign skaters. Ekaterina Ryabova and Vladimir Litvintsev — both skaters born and based in Russia — have finished in the top ten at the European Championships for Azerbaijan.

=== In Belarus ===
Minsk hosted the World Junior Championships in 2012.

=== In Belgium ===
Antwerp hosted the 1920 Summer Olympics, where figure skating made its second Olympic appearance.

In 1947, Micheline Lannoy / Pierre Baugniet became the first Belgians to win the World title in pair skating.

=== In Bosnia and Herzegovina ===
Sarajevo hosted the 1984 Winter Olympics and three World Junior Championships (1983, 1986, 1989).

=== In Bulgaria ===
Ice dancers Albena Denkova / Maxim Staviski were the first skaters to win a World title for Bulgaria, winning gold in 2006 and 2007.

Sofia has hosted the European Championships (1991, 1996) and World Junior Championships (2001, 2008, 2009, 2014).

=== In Canada ===
The first ISU Championships held in Canada were the 1932 World Championships in Montreal.

In 1947, Barbara Ann Scott became the first Canadian woman to win a World figure skating title. She successfully defended her title the following year. Frances Dafoe / Norris Bowden won Canada's first World pair skating title, in 1954, and repeated the following year. Barbara Wagner / Robert Paul won four consecutive World pairs' titles for Canada, from 1957 to 1960.

In 1957, Geraldine Fenton / William McLachlan became the first Canadian ice dancers to finish on the World podium, taking the silver medal. In 1962, Donald Jackson became the first Canadian to win the World men's title.

Donald McPherson (1963), Petra Burka (1965), and Karen Magnussen (1973) also won World titles for Canada. Kurt Browning became a four-time World champion (1989–91, 1993).

In 2003, Shae-Lynn Bourne / Victor Kraatz won Canada's first World ice dancing title. Tessa Virtue / Scott Moir would be the first Canadian ice dancers to win the Olympics, in 2010.

Montreal (1932), Vancouver (1960, 2001), Calgary (1972, 2006), Ottawa (1978, 1984), Halifax, Nova Scotia (1990), Edmonton (1996), and London, Ontario (2013) have hosted the World Championships. Halifax (1999), Hamilton, Ontario (2004), and Vancouver (2009) have hosted Four Continents. London, Ontario (1981), Kitchener, Ontario (1987, 2005), Hull, Quebec (1992), and Saint John, New Brunswick (1998) have hosted Junior Worlds. Calgary (1988) and Vancouver (2010) have also organized the Winter Olympics.

=== In China ===
In 1995, Chen Lu became the first Chinese woman to win a World title. In 2002, Shen Xue / Zhao Hongbo became the first pair from China to become World champions and the first pair to win an Olympic medal. In 2010, they became China's first Olympic champions in any figure skating category.

Shanghai was the first city in China to host the World Championships, in 2015. Beijing will organize the 2022 Winter Olympics.

Chinese skaters most commonly train in Beijing or Harbin.

=== In Chinese Taipei ===
The city of Taipei hosted the Four Continents Championships in 2011, 2014, and 2016. It will host the World Junior Championships in 2017.

=== In Croatia ===
Croatian skaters represented Yugoslavia until the end of the 1990–91 season. Sanda Dubravčić was the first Croatian woman to stand on an ISU Championship podium, winning silver at the 1981 European Championships. In 1992, Tomislav Čižmešija and Željka Čižmešija became the first skaters to represent Croatia at the Olympics and World Championships.

Zagreb hosted the European Championships in 1974, 1979, 2008, and 2013.

=== In the Czech Republic ===
The first ISU Championships held in the territory that would become the Czech Republic were the 1908 Worlds and 1928 Europeans. Both took place in Opava, which was known as Troppau in 1908. Some Czech skaters may have represented Austria until World War I, following which they could compete for Czechoslovakia.

Josef Slíva was the first Czech skater to compete at the Olympics, placing fourth in 1924 (Chamonix). Alena Vrzáňová was the first Czech woman to medal at the European Championships (taking bronze in 1948), to become a World champion (1949), and to become European champion (1950). Eva Romanová / Pavel Roman were the first Czech ice dancers to stand on a World podium, winning four consecutive gold medals (1962–65). Czech skaters represented Czechoslovakia until the end of the 1992–93 season.

In March 1995, pair skaters Radka Kovaříková / René Novotný won gold at the World Championships in Birmingham, England. In January 2008, Tomáš Verner was awarded gold at the European Championships in Zagreb, Croatia. In February 2009, Michal Březina won silver in men's singles at the 2009 World Junior Championships in Sofia, Bulgaria. He won bronze at the 2013 European Championships in Zagreb, Croatia. In March 2016, Anna Dušková / Martin Bidař became the Czech Republic's first World Junior champions in figure skating, taking gold in the pairs event in Debrecen, Hungary.

Two Czech skaters have won Grand Prix events – Verner, at the 2010 Cup of Russia, and Březina, at the 2011 Skate America.

Opava (1908) and Prague (1964, 1993) have hosted the World Championships. Opava (1928), Prague (1934, 1937, 1948, 1988, 1999), and Ostrava (2017) have been selected to host the European Championships.

=== In Denmark ===
Copenhagen is the only Danish city to host the European Championships (1975, 1986, 1994) or World Championships (1982).

=== In Estonia ===
Estonia began holding national championships in 1917 and was represented at the 1936 Winter Olympics. Following the Molotov–Ribbentrop Pact, it was occupied and annexed by the Soviet Union. Although it continued to be recognized as a sovereign state by most western governments, Estonian skaters could no longer represent their native country, until the 1990s. During the occupation, many Russians settled in Estonia and some remained after 1991. Some elite Estonian skaters have come from the Russian community.

Tallinn hosted the 2010 European Championships, 2015 World Junior Championships, and the ISU Junior Grand Prix in Estonia six times.

=== In Finland ===
The first ISU Championships held in Finland were the 1914 World Championships in Helsinki, Grand Duchy of Finland, Russian Empire.

In 1933, Marcus Nikkanen became the first Finn to medal in men's singles at the World Championships, winning bronze.

Helsinki is the only Finnish city to host the World Championships (1914, 1983, 1999, 2017). It hosted the European Championships in 1977, 1993, and 2009. 2023 European Championships were held in Espoo.

=== In France ===
Chamonix, France hosted the Figure skating at the 1924 Winter Olympics, where figure skating made its third Olympic appearance. In 1926, Andreé Joly-Brunet / Pierre Brunet won France's first World title in pair skating. They would win three more World titles as a pair.

The first ISU Championships held in France were the 1932 European and 1936 World Championships, both in Paris.

In 1952, Jacqueline du Bief became the first French skater to win the World ladies' title. In 1960, Alain Giletti won the first World men's title for France. Alain Calmat was the next World men's champion from France, in 1965.

In 1991, Isabelle Duchesnay / Paul Duchesnay won France's first World title in ice dancing. Marina Anissina / Gwendal Peizerat and Gabriella Papadakis / Guillaume Cizeron won Olympic gold medals in ice dancing for France, in 2002 and 2022, respectively.

In February 2022, France Info reported that the country possessed insufficient infrastructure, counting about a hundred ice rinks conforming to regulations and fifty other rinks, shared by twelve ice sports. The number of licensed ice skaters was approximately 22,000.

Paris (1932, 1956, 1997), Grenoble (1964), Strasbourg (1978), and Lyon (1982, 2006) have hosted the European Championships. Paris (1936, 1949, 1952, 1958, 1989), Lyon (1971), Nice (2000, 2012) have organized the World Championships. Megève (1976, 1977, 1978, and 1980) has hosted the World Junior Championships. Chamonix (1924), Grenoble (1968), and Albertville (1992) have organized the Olympics.

=== In Germany ===
The first European Championships were held in 1891 in Hamburg. In 1908, representing the German Empire, Anna Hübler / Heinrich Burger became the first-ever World champions in pair skating.

Following World War II, German competitors were barred from international events for several years. West Germany debuted at Worlds in 1951 and East Germany in 1962. In 1954, Gundi Busch (West Germany) became the first German to win a World ladies' title. East German ladies would grow more successful – Gabriele Seyfert, Christine Errath, Anett Pötzsch, and Katarina Witt won a total of nine World titles.

Aliona Savchenko / Robin Szolkowy won five World pairs' titles for Germany.

Berlin (1904, 1911, 1926, 1928, 1931, 1938), Munich (1906, 1974, 1991), Garmisch-Partenkirchen (1956), and Dortmund (1964, 1980, 2004) have hosted the World Championships.

=== In Hungary ===
The first ISU Championships held in Hungary were the 1895 European Championships in Budapest.

In 1908, Lily Kronberger became Hungary's first World figure skating champion. Hungarian skaters would win seven consecutive World ladies' titles – Kronberger in 1908–11, Opika von Méray Horváth in 1912–1914.

In the first half of the 20th century, Hungary had several World bronze medalist in men's singles – Andor Szende (1910, 1912–13), Dénes Pataky (1935), and Elemér Terták (1937). Ede Király won bronze in 1948 and then two consecutive silver medals.

In 1931, Emília Rotter / László Szollás won Hungary's first pair skating World title. Krisztina Regőczy / András Sallay were the first Hungarians to become World champions in ice dancing, winning the 1980 World Championships in Dortmund.

In February 2004, Júlia Sebestyén became the first Hungarian to win a European title in ladies' figure skating.

Budapest (1935, 1939, 1988) is the only city in Hungary to host the World Championships.

=== In India ===
As of 2011, India had four major indoor ice rinks, with plans for ten more to be built, mostly in malls, over the following five years. Gujarat's first indoor rink opened in 2015. The secretary of the Ice Skating Association of India stated that lack of government assistance and a scarcity of international standard rinks continued to hinder the development of its athletes.

=== In Israel ===
In January 2016, Oleksii Bychenko won silver at the European Championships in Bratislava; it was Israel's first European figure skating medal. In March 2016, Daniel Samohin was awarded gold at the World Junior Championships in Debrecen, becoming the first Israeli skater to stand on a World Junior podium and the first to win gold at an ISU Championship.

The number of young skaters training regularly in Israel expanded from twenty to over 350 after the 2013 opening of a rink in Holon but growth remained limited due to a "lack of funding and insufficient facilities".

=== In Italy ===
The first ISU Championships held in Italy were the 1949 European and 1951 World Championships, both in Milan. In 1953, Carlo Fassi won Italy's first World medal (bronze) in men's singles. Cortina d'Ampezzo hosted the 1956 Winter Olympics, where figure skating made its ninth Olympic appearance.

Rita Trapanese was the first Italian woman to stand on the European podium, winning bronze in 1971 and silver in 1972.

In March 2001, ice dancers Barbara Fusar-Poli / Maurizio Margaglio became the first Italians to win a World title in any figure skating discipline. In March 2012, Carolina Kostner became Italy's first World champion in ladies' singles. In March 2014, Anna Cappellini / Luca Lanotte won Italy's third World figure skating title.

Milan (1949, 1998), Bolzano (1954), and Turin (2005) have hosted the European Championships. Milan (1951), Cortina d'Ampezzo (1963), and Turin (2010) have hosted the World Championships. Cortina d'Ampezzo (1956) and Turin (2006) have organized the Olympics.

=== In Japan ===
By 1932, Japan began sending skaters to the World Championships and Olympics. Following World War II, Japanese competitors were barred from international events for several years and returned to the World Championships in 1951. Sapporo was the first Japanese city to host the Winter Olympics, in 1972, while Tokyo was the first Japanese city to host the World Championships, in 1977.

At the 1988 Winter Olympics in Calgary, Midori Ito became the first woman to land seven triple jumps in one segment. In March 1989, she won Japan's first World title in figure skating. In February 1992, she became the first Japanese skater to stand on an Olympic podium, winning silver at the Winter Olympics in Albertville, France. She is the first woman to land a triple-triple jump combination and a triple Axel in competition.

In February 2006, Shizuka Arakawa became the first Japanese skater to be awarded an Olympic gold medal.

Narumi Takahashi / Mervin Tran won Japan's first World medal in pair skating, taking bronze at the 2012 World Championships in Nice, France.

In February 2014, Yuzuru Hanyu won Japan's first Olympic title in men's figure skating. Mao Asada is her country's most successful ladies' figure skater at the World Championships, winning three titles.

Tokyo (1977, 1985, 2007), Chiba, Chiba (1994), Nagano (2002), Saitama, Saitama (2014) have hosted the World Championships, while Osaka (2000, 2013) has hosted Four Continents. Sapporo also hosted the 1984 World Junior Championships. Sapporo (1972) and Nagano (1998) have organized the Winter Olympics.

=== In Kazakhstan ===
In March 2013, Denis Ten was awarded the silver medal at the World Championships; it was Kazakhstan's first World medal in figure skating. In February 2014, he became his country's first Olympic medalist in figure skating, winning bronze in Sochi. In February 2015, he became the first skater from Kazakhstan to stand on the podium at a Four Continents Championships, receiving the gold medal.

Elizabet Tursynbayeva is Kazakhstan's first female skater to step on an ISU Championship podium. She won silver at both the 2019 Four Continents and 2019 World Championships.

Mikhail Shaidorov won the country's first gold in men's figure skating at the 2026 Winter Olympics. He also won Kazakhstan's first gold medal in 32 years at the Winter Olympics.

=== In Latvia ===
Latvia had representatives in all three disciplines at the 1936 Winter Olympics. Following the Molotov–Ribbentrop Pact, it was occupied and annexed by the Soviet Union. Although it continued to be recognized as a sovereign state by most western governments, Latvian skaters could no longer represent their native country, until the 1990s. During the occupation, many Russians settled in Latvia and some remained after 1991. Some elite Latvian skaters have come from the Russian community.

Konstantin Kostin (in 1993) and Angelīna Kučvaļska (in 2016) have finished as high as fourth at the European Championships.

=== In Lithuania ===
Following the Molotov–Ribbentrop Pact, Lithuania was occupied and annexed by the Soviet Union. Although it continued to be recognized as a sovereign state by most western governments, Lithuanian skaters could not represent their native country prior to the 1990s. Compared to the other Baltic states, fewer elite Lithuanian skaters have come from the Russian community due to the smaller scale of Russian immigration during the occupation. Margarita Drobiazko / Povilas Vanagas are the most successful Lithuanian skaters, having won bronze medals at the World Championships, European Championships, and Grand Prix Final.

=== In Malaysia ===
In March 2018, Julian Yee became the first Malaysian figure skater to compete at an Olympic Games.

Malaysia's Sports Commissioner de-registered the Ice Skating Association of Malaysia (ISAM) after ISAM failed to produce financial reports for multiple years. The Malaysia Ice Skating Federation (MISF) was formed in December 2018 to replace ISAM.

=== In the Netherlands ===
The Dutch added edges to ice skates in the 13th or 14th century. Skating was used as a means of transportation because the waterways which connected Dutch towns sometimes froze for months on end, hampering the economy.

In 1962, Sjoukje Dijkstra became the first World ladies' champion from the Netherlands. She would win three consecutive World titles.

=== In Norway ===
The first ISU Championships held in Norway were the 1898 European Championships in Trondheim.

Sonja Henie was the first Norwegian woman to become a World figure skating champion and the most successful ladies' singles skater in history. She won three consecutive Olympics (1928, 1932, 1936), ten consecutive World Championships (1927–36), and six consecutive European Championships (1931–36).

Oslo (1952) and Lillehammer (1994) have organized the Winter Olympics. Oslo has hosted the World Championships (1954). Trondheim (1898) and Oslo (1913, 1923, 1950) have hosted the European Championships.

=== In Poland ===
Due to the Partitions of Poland, Polish skaters initially lacked the option of representing their native country. Some may have competed for Austria, Germany or the Russian Empire until Poland regained its independence following World War I.

The first ISU Championships held in Poland were the 1908 European Championships in Warsaw, then under the Russian Empire. Zofia Bilorówna / Tadeusz Kowalski were Poland's first European medalists, winning bronze at the 1934 European Championships.

Grzegorz Filipowski won two European medals – bronze in 1985 and silver in 1989 – and bronze at the 1989 World Championships.

No Polish city has ever hosted the World Championships. Warsaw hosted the European Championships in 1908 and 2007.

=== In Russia ===
In 1896, the Russian Empire hosted the first World Figure Skating Championships, in Saint Petersburg. In October 1908, Nikolai Panin became Russia's first Olympic champion, winning gold in special figures at the Summer Olympics in London.

Following the Russian Civil War, Russian skaters represented the Soviet Union. Until the late 1950s, they were rarely sent to international competitions. Ludmila Belousova / Oleg Protopopov began the forty-year Soviet/Russian gold medal streak in pair skating, the longest in Olympic sports history, from 1964 to 2006. Irina Rodnina won ten consecutive World titles (1969–78) and three successive Olympic gold medals (1972, 1976, 1980). She and Artur Dmitriev are the only pair skaters to win the Olympics with two partners.

In 1969, Lyudmila Pakhomova / Aleksandr Gorshkov became the first Russian ice dancers to stand on a World podium, winning the silver medal. From 1970 to 1979, Moscow natives were awarded ten consecutive World ice dancing titles, beginning with Pakhomova/Gorshkov, who won five.

Russian skaters competed for the Soviet Union through the first half of the 1991–92 season. In the second half, they represented the Commonwealth of Independent States (at the 1992 Europeans and 1992 Worlds), and the Unified Team (at the 1992 Winter Olympics). By the start of the 1992–93 season, they were competing under the Russian flag.

Russian skaters won four consecutive Olympics in men's singles – Alexei Urmanov in 1994, Ilia Kulik in 1998, Alexei Yagudin in 2002, and Evgeni Plushenko in 2006. Yagudin also won four World titles (1998–2000, 2002) and three European titles, while Plushenko won three World titles (2001, 2003–04) and seven European titles. Ice dancers Oksana Grishuk / Evgeni Platov won two consecutive Olympic titles for Russia.

In March 1999, Maria Butyrskaya became the first Russian to win the World ladies' title.

The most common training locations for elite skaters are Moscow and Saint Petersburg. Perm, Yekaterinburg, and Kirov, Kirov Oblast have produced successful skaters. In the 21st century, Sochi grew in popularity as a training location. Saint Petersburg (1896, 1903) and Moscow (2005, 2011) have hosted the World Championships.

In March 2016, Russia had over 400 rinks with artificial ice.

=== In Slovakia ===
Some Slovak skaters may have represented Austria until World War I, following which they could compete for Czechoslovakia. The first ISU Championships held in Slovakia were the 1958 European Championships in Bratislava, Czechoslovakia.

Karol Divín, who trained in Bratislava, won the 1960 Olympic silver medal, two European titles (1958–59), and two World medals (silver in 1962, bronze in 1964). Ondrej Nepela was the first Slovak to become the World men's champion (1971–73) and the first to win the Olympics (1972). Jozef Sabovčík won the 1984 Olympic bronze medal and two European titles (1985 and 1986). Slovak skaters represented Czechoslovakia until the end of the 1992–93 season.

Bratislava (1973) is the only Slovak city to host the World Championships. It hosted the European Championships in 1958, 1966, 2001, and 2016.

=== In Slovenia ===
Ljubljana is the only Slovenian city to host the European Championships (1967) or World Championships (1970).

=== In South Korea ===
In February 2010, Yuna Kim became the first Olympic figure skating champion from South Korea.

Jeonju (2002, 2010), Gangneung (2005, 2017), Goyang (2008), and Seoul (2015, 2020) have been selected to host the Four Continents Championships. Seoul (1993, 1997) and Gangneung (2011) have also hosted the World Junior Championships. Pyeongchang will host the 2018 Winter Olympics.

=== In Spain ===
In January 2013, Javier Fernández became the first Spanish skater to win the European title. At the time, Spain had just 14 indoor rinks and 600 registered figure skaters. In March 2015, Fernández won Spain's first World title in figure skating. When he repeated in 2016, Spain had 17 ice rinks, compared to a hundred in Toronto, and 300 licensed skaters, compared to about 15,000 in France.

No ISU Championships have been held in Spain but the country has twice hosted the combined Grand Prix Final and Junior Grand Prix Final, in 2014 and 2015.

=== In Sweden ===
The first ISU Championships held in Sweden were the 1897 World Championships in Stockholm. Ulrich Salchow won ten World figure skating titles for Sweden (1901–05 and 1907–11).

Stockholm (1897, 1901, 1905, 1909, 1922, 1934, 1947) and Gothenburg (1976, 2008) have hosted the World Championships. Stockholm (1912, 2015), Västerås (1968), Gothenburg (1972, 1980, 1985), Malmö (2003) have hosted the European Championships.

=== In Switzerland ===
The first ISU Championships held in Switzerland were the 1899 Europeans and 1899 Worlds, both in Davos. Saint Moritz hosted the 1928 and 1948 Winter Olympics, where figure skating made its fourth and seventh Olympic appearances, respectively.

In 1947, Hans Gerschwiler won Switzerland's first World men's title. Stéphane Lambiel became a two-time World champion (2005–06).

Davos (1899, 1900, 1910, 1927, 1948, 1953, 1966), Zürich (1933), Geneva (1968, 1986), and Lausanne (1997) have hosted the World Championships. St. Moritz hosted the Olympics in 1928 and 1948.

=== In Ukraine ===
Ukrainian skaters competed for the Soviet Union for much of the 20th century. This ended after the December 1991 referendum, in which every oblast approved Ukraine's declaration of independence. In the second half of the 1991–92 season, Ukrainian skaters represented the Commonwealth of Independent States (at the 1992 Europeans and 1992 Worlds), and the Unified Team (at the 1992 Winter Olympics). By the start of the 1992–93 season, they were competing under the Ukrainian flag.

Viktor Petrenko won the 1992 Olympic title representing the Unified Team. Oksana Baiul won the 1993 World Championships and 1994 Olympics competing for Ukraine. Dmytro Dmytrenko won gold at the 1993 European Championships and Viacheslav Zagorodniuk took bronze at the 1994 World Championships.

Ukraine has never hosted a major international figure skating competition. It has organized four ISU Junior Grand Prix events, from 1997 to 2004. It was scheduled to host its first ISU Challenger Series event in November 2016 but the competition was cancelled. In 2010, Tatiana Volosozhar and Stanislav Morozov stated that conditions for skaters in Ukraine were poor, with only one good rink remaining. Most of Ukraine's figure skaters have come from Kyiv, Dnipro, Kharkiv, and Odesa. Western oblasts have developed few competitors due to limited ice rinks. In 2016, Uzhhorod began construction of an Olympic-sized ice rink.

=== In the United Kingdom ===
The first ISU Championships held in the United Kingdom were the 1898 World Championships in London. London was also the location of figure skating's Olympic debut, which occurred at the Summer Olympics in October 1908.

In February 1899, Edgar Syers became the first British skater to win a World medal, taking the bronze medal. In 1902, Madge Syers won the World silver medal competing against men. In 1906, following the creation of a separate category for women, she became the first-ever World ladies' champion. In 1909, Phyllis Johnson / James H. Johnson became the first British pair to win the World title.

Jean Westwood / Lawrence Demmy won the first-ever World ice dancing title, in 1952, and went on to become four-time World champions. British ice dancers won nine consecutive World titles from 1952 to 1960. Jayne Torvill / Christopher Dean won the 1984 Winter Olympics.

London (1898, 1902, 1929, 1950), Manchester (1912, 1924), and Birmingham (1995) have hosted the World Championships.

In August 2000, Sport England decided that the National Ice Skating Association would no longer receive £400,000 annually from lottery funds, citing poor performance.

=== In the United States ===
In 1924, Beatrix Loughran became the first U.S. skater to stand on the World ladies' podium, winning the bronze medal. She also won silver at the 1924 Winter Olympics. The first ISU Championships held in the United States were the 1930 World Championships in New York City. Lake Placid, New York hosted the 1932 Winter Olympics, where figure skating made its fifth Olympic appearance.

Figure skating grew in the U.S. following World War II. In 1948, Dick Button became the first American men's skater to win the Olympics, and the first to become World champion. In 1950, Karol Kennedy / Peter Kennedy won the United States' first World pair skating title. In 1953, Tenley Albright became the first American woman to win the World title.

From 1948 through 1959, the United States won twelve consecutive World men's titles – Button won five (1948–52), Hayes Alan Jenkins won four (1953–56), and David Jenkins won three (1957–59). From 1953 to 1960, American women won seven World titles – Albright (1953, 1955) and Carol Heiss (1956–60).

In 1952, Carol Ann Peters / Daniel Ryan won bronze at the first-ever World ice dancing competition. In 1961, 18 American skaters heading to the World Championships were killed in the Sabena Flight 548 crash.

In 1966, Peggy Flemming won the first of three consecutive World titles. In 1979, Tai Babilonia / Randy Gardner became the second American pair to become World champions.

Between 1996 and 2003, Michelle Kwan won five World titles. In February 2014, Meryl Davis / Charlie White became the first American ice dancers to become Olympic champions.

New York City (1930), Colorado Springs, Colorado (1957, 1959, 1965, 1969, 1975), Hartford, Connecticut (1981), Cincinnati (1987), Oakland, California (1992), Minneapolis (1998), Washington, D.C. (2003), Los Angeles (2009), and Boston (2016) have hosted the World Championships. Lake Placid, New York (1932, 1980), Squaw Valley, California (1960), and Salt Lake City, Utah (2002) have organized the Olympics. Salt Lake City (2001), Colorado Springs (2006, 2007, 2012) have hosted Four Continents. Colorado Springs (1985, 1990, 1994) has hosted the World Junior Championships.

== See also ==
- List of member federations of the International Skating Union
