= 1929 World Figure Skating Championships =

Annual figure skating competition held in 1929

- Type: ISU Championship
- Season: 1929
- Location: London, United Kingdom (men) (Kingdom of Hungary) Budapest, Hungary (ladies and pairs)

Champions
- Men's singles: (Sweden) Gillis Grafström
- Ladies' singles: (Norway) Sonja Henie
- Pairs: (Austria) Lilly Scholz / Otto Kaiser
- Previous: 1928 World Championships
- Next: 1930 World Championships

The World Figure Skating Championships is an annual figure skating competition sanctioned by the International Skating Union in which figure skaters compete for the title of World Champion.

Men's competitions took place from March 4 to 5 in London, United Kingdom. Ladies' and pairs' competitions took place from February 2 to 3 in Budapest, Hungary.

== Results ==
=== Men ===
Rank	Name	Points	Places
1	(Sweden) Gillis Grafström	353.15	6
2	(Austria) Karl Schäfer	346.50	10
3	(Austria) Ludwig Wrede	323.70	16
4	(United Kingdom) John Page	312.70	24
5	(Austria) Hugo Distler		25
6	(Finland) Markus Nikkanen		26
7	(United Kingdom) Ian Bowhill		32

Judges:

- (Austria) Eduard Engelmann
- (Switzerland) L. Liebermann
- (Belgium) André Poplimont
- (Sweden) Ulrich Salchow
- (United Kingdom) V. C. Wilson

=== Ladies ===
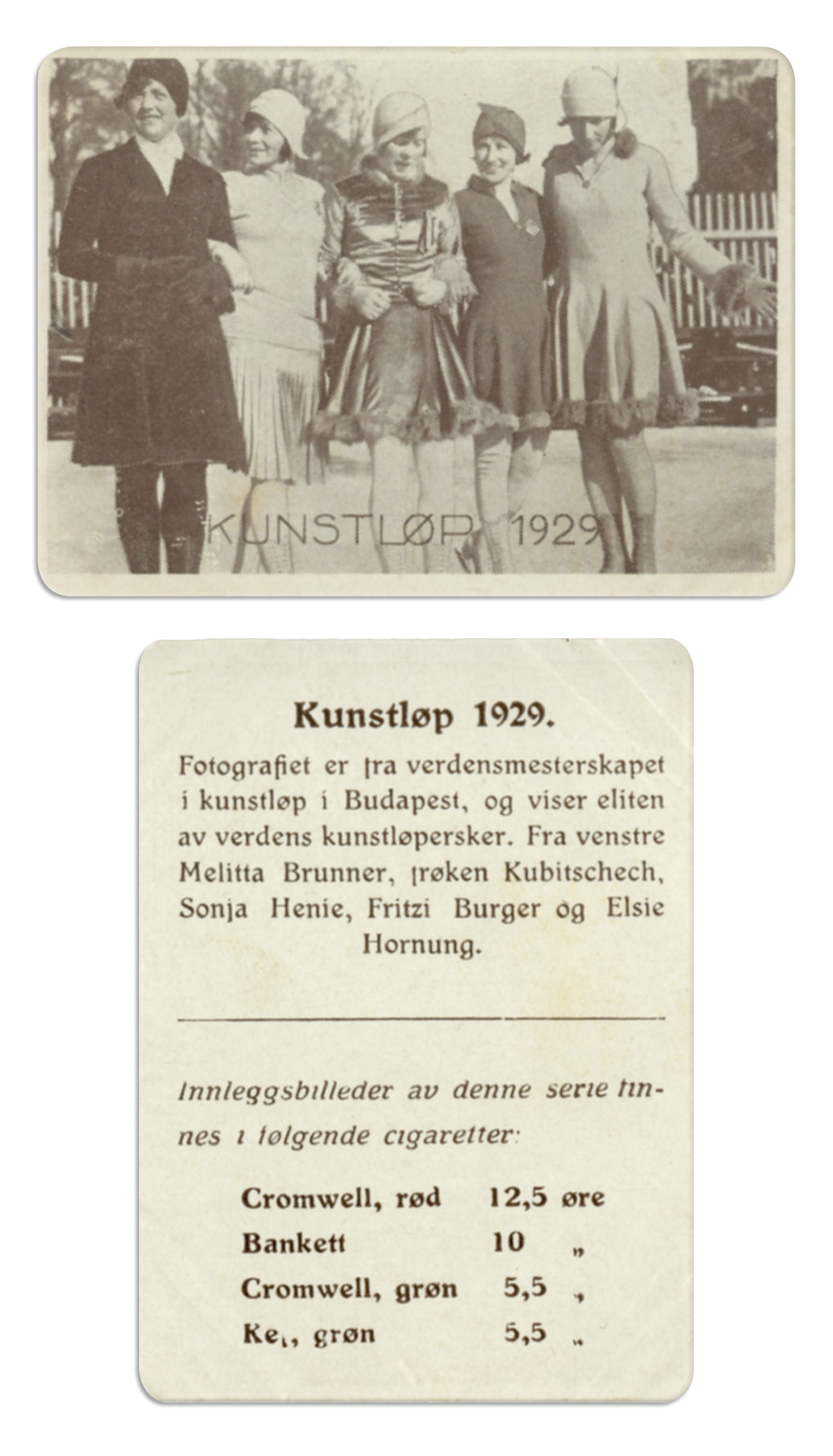
Medalwinners and 4th and 5th-place pictured.

Rank	Name	Points	Places
1	(Norway) Sonja Henie	280.40	5
2	(Austria) Fritzi Burger	259.25	12
3	(Austria) Melitta Brunner	254.65	13
4	(Austria) Ilse Hornung	236.10	20
5	(Austria) Grete Kubitschek	216.65	26
6	(Belgium) Yvonne de Ligne-Geurts	208.50	29

Judges:

- (Norway) B. Børjeson
- (United Kingdom) Herbert Clarke
- (Austria) Eduard Engelmann
- (Finland) Walter Jakobsson
- (Belgium) Fernand de Montigny

=== Pairs ===
Rank	Name	Points	Places
1	(Austria) Lilly Scholz / Otto Kaiser	11.25	6
2	(Austria) Melitta Brunner / Ludwig Wrede	10.75	13
3	(Kingdom of Hungary) Olga Orgonista / Sándor Szalay	10.30	18
4	(Austria) Gisela Hochhaltinger / Otto Preißecker	10.35	21.5
5	(Kingdom of Hungary) Emília Rotter / László Szollás	10.30	21.5
6	(Czechoslovakia) Else Hoppe / Oscar Hoppe	10.05	25
7	(Germany) Maria Schwendtbauer / Gustav Aichinger	8.30	35

Judges:

- (Austria) Otto Bohatsch
- (Norway) B. Børjeson
- (United Kingdom) C. J. Clarke
- (Finland) Ludowika Jakobsson-Eilers
- (Kingdom of Hungary) Tivadar Meszléri
