= Figure skating at the 1924 Winter Olympics – Men's singles =

Figure skating at the Olympics

Men's singles at the I Olympic Winter Games
- Dates: 29–30 January 1924
- Competitors: 11 from 9 nations

Medalists
1st place, gold medalist(s)		Gillis Grafström; Sweden
2nd place, silver medalist(s)		Willy Böckl; Austria
3rd place, bronze medalist(s)		Georges Gautschi; Switzerland

The men's individual skating event was held as part of the figure skating at the 1924 Winter Olympics. It was the third appearance of the event, which had previously been held at the Summer Olympics in 1908 and 1920. The competition was held on Tuesday, 29 January and on Wednesday, 30 January 1924. Eleven figure skaters from nine nations competed.

== Results ==
Gillis Grafström successfully defended his 1920 title.

Rank	Name	Nation	CF	FS	Total points	Places
1	Gillis Grafström	Sweden	1	2	367.89	10
2	Willy Böckl	Austria	2	1	359.82	13
3	Georges Gautschi	Switzerland	3	4	319.07	23
4	Josef Slíva	Czechoslovakia	5	3	310.77	28
5	John Page	Great Britain	6	5	295.36	36
6	Nathaniel Niles	United States	4	9	274.47	46
7	Melville Rogers	Canada	7	8	269.82	51
8	Pierre Brunet	France	9	6	268.61	54
9	Freddy Mésot	Belgium	8	7	266.18	54
10	Herbert Clarke	Great Britain	10	11	219.75	70
11	André Malinet	France	11	10	202.46	77

Referee:

- (Austria) Alexander von Szabo de Bucs

Judges:

- (France) Francis Pigueron
- (France) Louis Magnus
- (Czechoslovakia) Hynek Kott
- (Switzerland) J.G. Künzli
- (United Kingdom) Herbert Yglesias
- (Austria) Josef Fellner
- (Austria) Ernst Herz
