= Figure skating at the 1928 Winter Olympics – Men's singles =

Figure skating at the Olympics

Men's singles at the II Olympic Winter Games
- Venue: St. Moritz Olympic Ice Rink
- Dates: 14–17 February 1928
- Competitors: 17 from 10 nations

Medalists
| 1st place, gold medalist(s) | | Gillis Grafström; Sweden |
| 2nd place, silver medalist(s) | | Willy Böckl; Austria |
| 3rd place, bronze medalist(s) | | Robert van Zeebroeck; Belgium |

The men's individual skating event was held as part of the figure skating at the 1928 Winter Olympics. It was the fourth appearance of the event, which had previously been held at the Summer Olympics in 1908 and 1920 and was also part of the first Winter Games in 1924. The competition was held from Tuesday, 14 February to Friday, 17 February 1928. Seventeen figure skaters from ten nations competed.

== Results ==
Gillis Grafström successfully defended his 1920 and 1924 title again with Austrian Willy Böckl finishing in second place as four years earlier. Another Austrian Karl Schäfer finished fourth in this event. He went on to win gold medals in the next two consecutive Olympic Games.

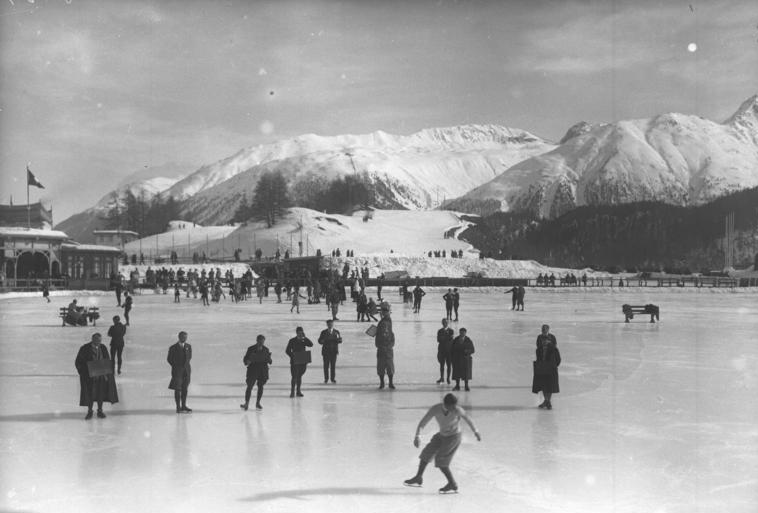
Gillis Grafström during the compulsory figures

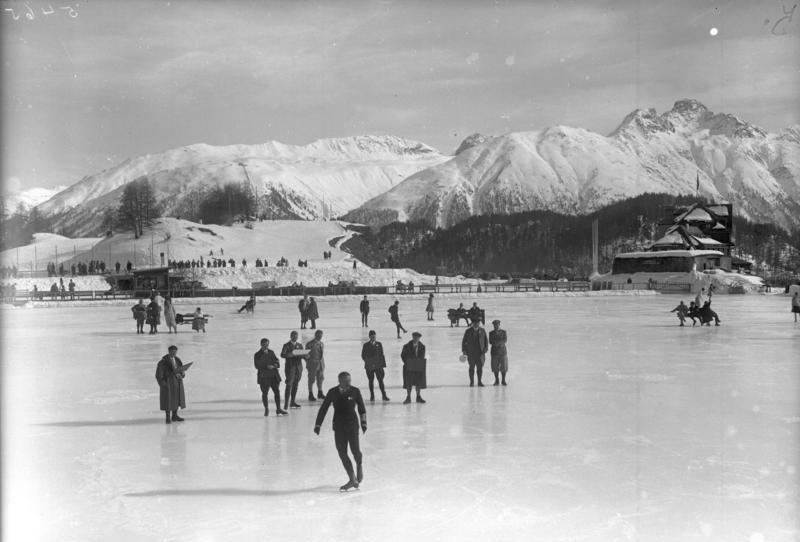
Willy Böckl during the compulsory figures

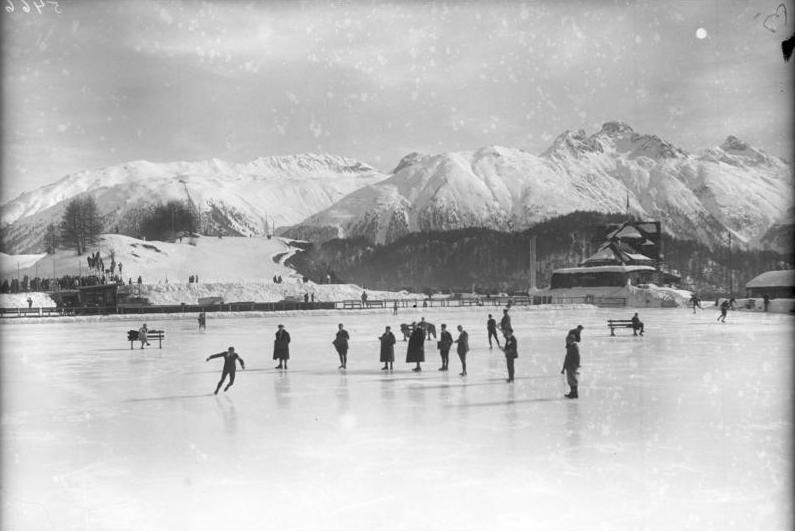
Werner Rittberger during the compulsory figures

| Rank | Name | Nation | CF | FS | Total points | Places |
|---|---|---|---|---|---|---|
| 1 | Gillis Grafström | Sweden | 1 | 1 | 1630.75 | 12 |
| 2 | Willy Böckl | Austria | 2 | 2 | 1625.50 | 13 |
| 3 | Robert van Zeebroeck | Belgium | 3 | 3 | 1542.75 | 27 |
| 4 | Karl Schäfer | Austria | 6 | 4 | 1463.75 | 35 |
| 5 | Josef Slíva | Czechoslovakia | 5 | 5 | 1469.00 | 36 |
| 6 | Marcus Nikkanen | Finland | 4 | 8 | 1480.00 | 46 |
| 7 | Pierre Brunet | France | 7 | 7 | 1447.75 | 50 |
| 8 | Ludwig Wrede | Austria | 10 | 6 | 1368.75 | 53 |
| 9 | John Page | Great Britain | 8 | 11 | 1424.00 | 62 |
| 10 | Roger Turner | United States | 9 | 12 | 1363.50 | 67 |
| 11 | Sherwin Badger | United States | 13 | 9 | 1324.00 | 73 |
| 12 | Paul Franke | Germany | 14 | 10 | 1326.00 | 76 |
| 13 | Montgomery Wilson | Canada | 11 | 16 | 1345.00 | 92 |
| 14 | Ian Bowhill | Great Britain | 15 | 14 | 1202.25 | 101 |
| 15 | Nathaniel Niles | United States | 16 | 13 | 1154.25 | 103 |
| 16 | Jack Eastwood | Canada | 17 | 15 | 1136.25 | 106 |
| WD | Werner Rittberger | Germany | 12 | | | |

Referee:

- (Sweden) Ulrich Salchow

Judges:

- (Germany) Kurt Dannenberg
- (Austria) Eduard Engelmann
- (Belgium) Paul Baudouin
- (United Kingdom) Herbert J. Clarke
- (Finland) Sakari Ilmanen
- (United States) Joel B. Liberman
- (Czechoslovakia) Vojtěch Veselý
