= 1928 World Figure Skating Championships =

Annual figure skating competition held in 1928

- Type: ISU Championship
- Season: 1928
- Location: Berlin, Germany (men); London, United Kingdom (ladies and pairs)
- Venue: Sportpalast (men)

Champions
- Men's singles: (Austria) Willy Böckl
- Ladies' singles: (Norway) Sonja Henie
- Pairs: (France) Andrée Joly / Pierre Brunet
- Previous: 1927 World Championships
- Next: 1929 World Championships

The World Figure Skating Championships is an annual figure skating competition sanctioned by the International Skating Union in which figure skaters compete for the title of World Champion. Men's competitions took place from February 25 to 26 in Berlin, Germany. Ladies' and pairs' competitions took place from March 5 to 6 in London, United Kingdom.

== Results ==
=== Men ===
Rank	Name	Places
1	(Austria) Willy Böckl	5.5
2	(Austria) Karl Schäfer	11.5
3	(Austria) Hugo Distler	22
4	(United Kingdom) John Page	25
5	(United States) Roger Turner	26
6	(Austria) Ludwig Wrede	27
7	(Canada) Montgomery Wilson	29
8	(Germany) Paul Franke	35
9	(Canada) Jack Eastwood	44
10	(United States) Nathaniel Niles	50

Judges:

- (United Kingdom) Kenneth Beaumont
- (Austria) Ludwig Fänner
- (Czechoslovakia) Otto Maly
- (Sweden) Harald Rooth
- (Germany) Otto Schöning

=== Ladies ===
Rank	Name	Places
1	(Norway) Sonja Henie	6
2	(United States) Maribel Vinson	13
3	(Austria) Fritzi Burger	15
4	(Canada) Constance Wilson	18
5	(Austria) Melitta Brunner	23
6	(United Kingdom) Kathleen Shaw	30

Judges:

- (Norway) B. Børjeson
- (Austria) Willy Böckl
- (United Kingdom) Herbert Clarke
- (France) René Japiot
- (Sweden) Ulrich Salchow

=== Pairs ===
Rank	Name	Places
1	(France) Andrée Joly / Pierre Brunet	7
2	(Austria) Lilly Scholz / Otto Kaiser	8
3	(Austria) Melitta Brunner / Ludwig Wrede	18
4	(United Kingdom) Ethel Muckelt / John Page	18
5	(United States) Beatrix Loughran / Sherwin Badger	25
6	(Canada) Maude Smith / Jack Eastwood	33.5
7	(United States) Theresa Weld / Nathaniel Niles	35
8	(United Kingdom) Kathleen Lovett / Proctor Burman	35.5

Judges:

- (Austria) Willy Böckl
- (Norway) B. Børjeson
- (France) René Japiot
- (Sweden) Ulrich Salchow
- (United Kingdom) Herbert Yglesias
