= 1925 European Figure Skating Championships =

Figure skating competition

1925 European Championships
- Type: ISU Championship
- Season: 1924–25
- Location: Triberg, Germany

Champions
- Men's singles: (Austria) Willy Böckl
- Previous: 1924 European Championships
- Next: 1926 European Championships

The 1925 European Figure Skating Championships were held in Triberg, Germany. Elite senior-level figure skaters from European ISU member nations competed for the title of European Champion in the discipline of men's singles.

== Results ==
Rank	Name	Places
1	(Austria) Willy Böckl	
2	(Germany) Werner Rittberger	
3	(Austria) Otto Preißecker	
4	(Switzerland) Georges Gautschi	
5	(Austria) Ludwig Wrede	
6	(Germany) Paul Franke	
