= 1925 World Figure Skating Championships =

Annual figure skating competition held in 1925

- Type: ISU Championship
- Season: 1925
- Location: Vienna, Austria (men and pairs); Davos, Switzerland (ladies)

Champions
- Men's singles: (Austria) Willy Böckl
- Ladies' singles: (Austria) Herma Szabo
- Pairs: (Austria) Herma Szabo / Ludwig Wrede
- Previous: 1924 World Championships
- Next: 1926 World Championships

The World Figure Skating Championships is an annual figure skating competition sanctioned by the International Skating Union in which figure skaters compete for the title of World Champion. Men's and pairs' competitions took place from February 14 to 15 in Vienna, Austria. Ladies' competitions took place from January 31 to February 1 in Davos, Switzerland.

== Results ==
=== Men ===
Rank	Name	Places
1	(Austria) Willy Böckl	8
2	(Austria) Fritz Kachler	8
3	(Austria) Otto Preißecker	14
4	(Austria) Ernst Oppacher	24
5	(Czechoslovakia) Josef Slíva	27
6	(Switzerland) Georges Gautschi	27
7	(Austria) Ludwig Wrede	32

Judges:

- (Austria) Max Bohatsch
- (Austria) Josef Fellner
- (Austria) Ernst Herz
- (Kingdom of Hungary) Andor Szende
- (Kingdom of Hungary) László Szollás

=== Ladies ===
Rank	Name	Places
1	(Austria) Herma Plank-Szabo	6
2	(Germany) Ellen Brockhöft	9
3	(Germany) Elisabeth Böckel	18
4	(United Kingdom) Kathleen Shaw	20
5	(United Kingdom) Ethel Muckelt	22

Judges:

- (Austria) Josef Fellner
- (Germany) Fritz Hellmund
- (Austria) Fritz Kachler
- (Switzerland) G. Künzli
- (Kingdom of Hungary) Andor Szende

=== Pairs ===
Rank	Name	Places
1	(Austria) Herma Plank-Szabo / Ludwig Wrede	10
2	(France) Andrée Joly / Pierre Brunet	10.5
3	(Austria) Lilly Scholz / Otto Kaiser	14.5
4	(Austria) Gisela Hochhaltinger / Georg Pamperl	17
5	(Czechoslovakia) Else Hoppe / Oscar Hoppe	23

Judges:

- (Austria) Otto Bohatsch
- (Austria) Ernst Herz
- (Kingdom of Hungary) Jenő Minich
- (Kingdom of Hungary) Andor Szende
- (Kingdom of Hungary) László Szollás
