= 1927 World Figure Skating Championships =

Annual figure skating competition held in 1927

- Type: ISU Championship
- Season: 1927
- Location: Davos, Switzerland (men); Oslo, Norway (ladies); Vienna, Austria (pairs)

Champions
- Men's singles: (Austria) Willy Böckl
- Ladies' singles: (Norway) Sonja Henie
- Pairs: (Austria) Herma Szabo / Ludwig Wrede
- Previous: 1926 World Championships
- Next: 1928 World Championships

The World Figure Skating Championships is an annual figure skating competition sanctioned by the International Skating Union in which figure skaters compete for the title of World Champion.

In 1927, men's competitions took place from February 5th to 6th in Davos, Switzerland. Ladies' competitions took place from February 19th to 20th in Oslo, Norway. Pairs' competitions took place from February 22nd to 23rd in Vienna, Austria.

== Results ==
=== Men ===
Rank	Name	Places
1	(Austria) Willy Böckl	11
2	(Austria) Otto Preißecker	15
3	(Austria) Karl Schäfer	24
4	(Switzerland) Georges Gautschi	26
5	(United Kingdom) John Page	30
6	(Austria) Ludwig Wrede	42
7	(Germany) Herbert Haertel	48
8	(France) Jean Henrion	56

Judges:

- (Germany) Kurt Dannenberg
- (Austria) Eduard Engelmann
- (Austria) Josef Fellner
- (Austria) Fritz Kachler
- (Switzerland) J. G. Künzli
- (United Kingdom) Thomas Richardson
- (Germany) Artur Vieregg

=== Ladies ===
This result was controversial because the three Norwegian member of the judging panel placed the Sonja Henie on the first place, while the other two placed Herma Szabo, who retired after the competition.

Rank	Name	Judges					Places
Rank	Name	#1	#2	#3	#4	#5	Places
1	(Norway) Sonja Henie	1	1	1	2	2	7
2	(Austria) Herma Plank-Szabo	2	2	2	1	1	8
3	(Norway) Karen Simensen	3	3	3	4	4	17
4	(Germany) Ellen Brockhöft	4	4	4	3	3	18

Judges:

- (Norway) Arne Christiansen
- (Norway) O. R. Kolderup
- (Norway) Knut Ørn Meinich
- (Austria) Walter Müller
- (Germany) Artur Vieregg

=== Pairs ===
Rank	Name	Places
1	(Austria) Herma Plank-Szabo / Ludwig Wrede	6.5
2	(Austria) Lilly Scholz / Otto Kaiser	9
3	(Czechoslovakia) Else Hoppe / Oscar Hoppe	14.5
4	(Austria) Hansi Eissert / Georg Pamperl	20

Judges:

- (Finland) Walter Jakobsson
- (Czechoslovakia) Otto Maly
- (Austria) Walter Müller
- (Germany) Max Rendschmidt
- (Austria) K. Scheibner
