= 1926 World Figure Skating Championships =

Annual figure skating competition held in 1926

- Type: ISU Championship
- Season: 1926
- Location: Berlin, Germany (men and pairs); Stockholm, Sweden (ladies)

Champions
- Men's singles: (Austria) Willy Böckl
- Ladies' singles: (Austria) Herma Szabo
- Pairs: (France) Andrée Joly / Pierre Brunet
- Previous: 1925 World Championships
- Next: 1927 World Championships

The World Figure Skating Championships is an annual figure skating competition sanctioned by the International Skating Union in which figure skaters compete for the title of World Champion. Men's and pairs' competitions took place from 13 to 14 February in Berlin, Germany. Ladies' competitions took place from 7 to 8 February in Stockholm, Sweden.

== Results ==
=== Men ===
Rank	Name	Places
1	(Austria) Willy Böckl	7
2	(Austria) Otto Preißecker	11
3	(United Kingdom) John Page	18
4	(Germany) Werner Rittberger	21
5	(Czechoslovakia) Josef Slíva	26
6	(Austria) Ludwig Wrede	29
7	(Belgium) Robert van Zeebroeck	30
8	(Norway) Arne Lie	41
9	(Germany) Paul Franke	42

Judges:

- (United Kingdom) Herbert Clarke
- (Germany) P. Engelhard
- (Finland) Walter Jakobsson
- (France) René Japiot
- (Austria) Fritz Kachler

=== Ladies ===
Rank	Name	Places
1	(Austria) Herma Plank-Szabo	5
2	(Norway) Sonja Henie	10
3	(United Kingdom) Kathleen Shaw	16
4	(Germany) Elisabeth Böckel	21
5	(Norway) Solveig Johansen	26
6	(Austria) Hildegard Thiel	27

Judges:

- (Austria) Ludwig Fänner
- (Finland) Walter Jakobsson
- (Norway) O. R. Kolderup
- (Germany) Hugo Metzner
- (Sweden) Tore Mothander

=== Pairs ===
Rank	Name	Places
1	(France) Andrée Joly / Pierre Brunet	12
2	(Austria) Lilly Scholz / Otto Kaiser	22
3	(Austria) Herma Plank-Szabo / Ludwig Wrede	26
4	(Austria) Gisela Hochhaltinger / Georg Pamperl	32.5
5	(Norway) Sonja Henie / Arne Lie	33.5
6	(United Kingdom) Ethel Muckelt / John Page	40
7	(Czechoslovakia) Else Hoppe / Oscar Hoppe	42.5
8	(Germany) Ilse Kishauer / Herbert Haertel	52.5
9	(Germany) Grete Weise / Georg Velisch	60.5
10	(Sweden) Margit Edlund / Anders Palm	63.5

Judges:

- (Norway) Yngvar Bryn
- (United Kingdom) Herbert Clarke
- (Finland) Walter Jakobsson
- (France) René Japiot
- (Austria) Fritz Kachler
- (Germany) E. Query
- (Germany) Hugo Winzer
