= 1926 European Figure Skating Championships =

Figure skating competition

1926 European Championships
- Type: ISU Championship
- Season: 1925–26
- Location: Davos, Switzerland

Champions
- Men's singles: (Austria) Willy Böckl
- Previous: 1925 European Championships
- Next: 1927 European Championships

The 1926 European Figure Skating Championships were held in Davos, Switzerland. Elite senior-level figure skaters from European ISU member nations competed for the title of European Champion in the discipline of men's singles.

== Results ==
Rank	Name	Places
1	(Austria) Willy Böckl	
2	(Austria) Otto Preißecker	
3	(Switzerland) Georges Gautschi	
4	(United Kingdom) John Page	
5	(Finland) Gunnar Jakobsson	
6	(Belgium) Robert van Zeebroeck	
7	(Austria) Hugo Distler	
8	(Germany) Artur Vieregg	
