= Andrée Brunet =

French figure skater (1901–1993)

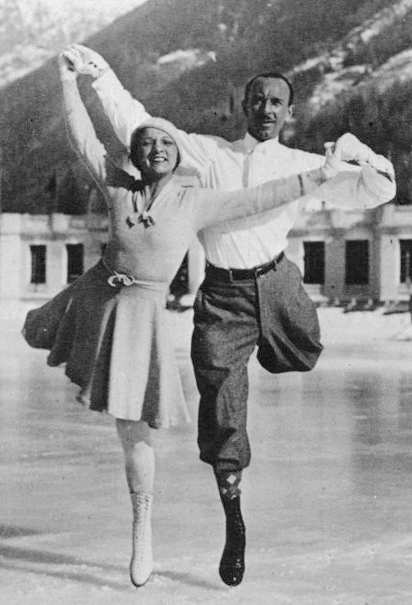
- Andrée and Pierre Brunet in 1933

Personal information
- Full name: Andrée Marguerite Blanche Brunet
- Other names: Andrée Joly
- Born: 16 September 1901 Paris, France
- Died: 30 March 1993 (aged 91) Boyne City, Michigan, US
- Height: 165 cm (5 ft 5 in)

Figure skating career
- Partner: Pierre Brunet
- Retired: 1936
Medal record
Pairs figure skating
Representing France
Olympic Games
Gold medal – first place	1932 Lake Placid	Pairs
Gold medal – first place	1928 St. Moritz	Pairs
Bronze medal – third place	1924 Chamonix	Pairs
World Championships
Gold medal – first place	1932 Montreal	Pairs
Gold medal – first place	1930 New York	Pairs
Gold medal – first place	1928 London	Pairs
Gold medal – first place	1926 Berlin	Pairs
Silver medal – second place	1925 Vienna	Pairs
European Championships
Gold medal – first place	1932 Paris	Pairs

Andrée Marguerite Blanche Brunet (née Joly, 16 September 1901 – 30 March 1993) was a French figure skater. Together with her husband Pierre Brunet she won Olympic medals in 1924, 1928 and 1932, as well as four world titles between 1926 and 1932 in pair skating. She also competed in singles, winning the national title in 1921–1930 and finishing fifth at the 1924 Winter Olympics.

== Biography ==
Andrée Brunet and Pierre Brunet are credited with creating mirror skating, new jumps, lifts, and spins. At their first Olympic games, the 1924 Games in Chamonix, they performed more skills than any pair previously had. However, the judges thought they performed too many tricks, and they were awarded only the bronze. Other skaters took note though, and the Joly/Brunet style quickly became common in the sport. Joly and Brunet continued to perform skills previously unseen in pair skating.

Joly and Brunet were the first French skaters to win gold medals in World, European, and Olympic competitions. They won bronze medals at the 1924 Olympic Winter Games. At the 1925 World Championships, they came in second place behind Herma Szabo and Ludwig Wrede from Austria, in what figure skating historian James M. Hines calls "one of the closest contests in pair skating history". They won every competition they entered after that: the 1932 European Championships; the World Championships in 1926, 1928, 1930, and 1932; and two Olympic titles in 1928 and 1932.

Joly and Brunet also competed in individual events—Joly placed 5th and 11th at the 1924 and 1928 Olympics, respectively. She was also the French women's champion from 1921 to 1931.

Joly married Brunet in 1927 (and thereafter competed under the name "Brunet" instead of her maiden name "Joly"). In 1936 they turned professional and toured Europe and Canada. In 1940 they emigrated to New York. They then became coaches, and trained future Olympic champions Carol Heiss and Scott Hamilton. They coached in New York, Illinois, and Michigan until retiring in 1979.

The couple had a son, Jean-Pierre, who became the U.S. pairs champion with Donna Jeanne Pospisil in 1945 and 1946.

Andrée Brunet and Pierre Brunet were inducted into the World Figure Skating Hall of Fame in 1976, as part of the first class of inductees.

== Results ==
Ladies singles

Event	1921	1922	1923	1924	1925	1926	1927	1928	1929	1930
Winter Olympic Games				5th				11th		
French Championships	1st	1st	1st	1st	1st	1st	1st	1st	1st	1st

Pairs (with Pierre Brunet)

Event	1924	1925	1926	1927	1928	1929	1930	1931	1932	1933	1934	1935
Winter Olympic Games	3rd				1st				1st			
World Championships		2nd	1st		1st		1st		1st			
European Championships									1st			
French Championships	1st	1st	1st	1st	1st	1st	1st	1st	1st	1st		1st
