= 1927 European Figure Skating Championships =

Figure skating competition

1927 European Championships
- Type: ISU Championship
- Season: 1926–27
- Location: Vienna, Austria

Champions
- Men's singles: (Austria) Willy Böckl
- Previous: 1926 European Championships
- Next: 1928 European Championships

The 1927 European Figure Skating Championships were held in Vienna, Austria. Elite senior-level figure skaters from European ISU member nations competed for the title of European Champion in the discipline of men's singles.

== Results ==
Rank	Name	Places
1	(Austria) Willy Böckl	
2	(Austria) Hugo Distler	
3	(Austria) Karl Schäfer	
4	(Austria) Ernst Oppacher	
5	(Germany) Paul Franke	
