= 1929 European Figure Skating Championships =

Figure skating competition

1929 European Championships
- Type: ISU Championship
- Season: 1928–29
- Location: Davos, Switzerland

Champions
- Men's singles: (Austria) Karl Schäfer
- Previous: 1928 European Championships
- Next: 1930 European Championships

The 1929 European Figure Skating Championships were held in Davos, Switzerland. Elite senior-level figure skaters from European ISU member nations competed for the title of European Champion in the discipline of men's singles.

== Results ==
Rank	Name	Places
1	(Austria) Karl Schäfer	
2	(Switzerland) Georges Gautschi	
3	(Austria) Ludwig Wrede	
4	(Germany) Herbert Haertel	
5	(Austria) Josef Bernhauser	
6	(Germany) Paul Franke	
7	(Germany) Ernst Baier	
8	(Czechoslovakia) Rudolf Praznowski	
9	(Germany) H. Danzig	
10	(Germany) Benno Wellmann	
