= Austria at the 1924 Winter Olympics =

- IOC code: AUT
- NOC: Austrian Olympic Committee
- Website: www.olympia.at (in German)

in Chamonix
- Competitors: 4 (2 men, 2 women) in 1 sport
- Medals Ranked 3rd: Gold 2 Silver 1 Bronze 0 Total 3

Winter Olympics appearances (overview)
- 1924; 1928; 1932; 1936; 1948; 1952; 1956; 1960; 1964; 1968; 1972; 1976; 1980; 1984; 1988; 1992; 1994; 1998; 2002; 2006; 2010; 2014; 2018; 2022; 2026

Austria competed at the 1924 Winter Olympics in Chamonix, France.

== Medalists ==
Medal	Name	Sport	Event
Gold	Herma Planck-Szabó	Figure skating	women's singles
Gold	Helene Engelmann; Alfred Berger	Figure skating	pairs
Silver	Willy Böckl	Figure skating	Men's singles

== Figure skating ==
Men

Athlete	Event	CF	FS	Points	Places	Final rank
Willy Böckl	Men's singles	3	4	319.07	23	2nd place, silver medalist(s)

Women

Athlete	Event	CF	FS	Points	Places	Final rank
Herma Szabo	Women's singles	1	1	299.17	7	1st place, gold medalist(s)

Pairs

Athletes	Points	Score	Final rank
Helene Engelmann; Alfred Berger	9	10.64	1st place, gold medalist(s)
