= Professional Skaters Association =

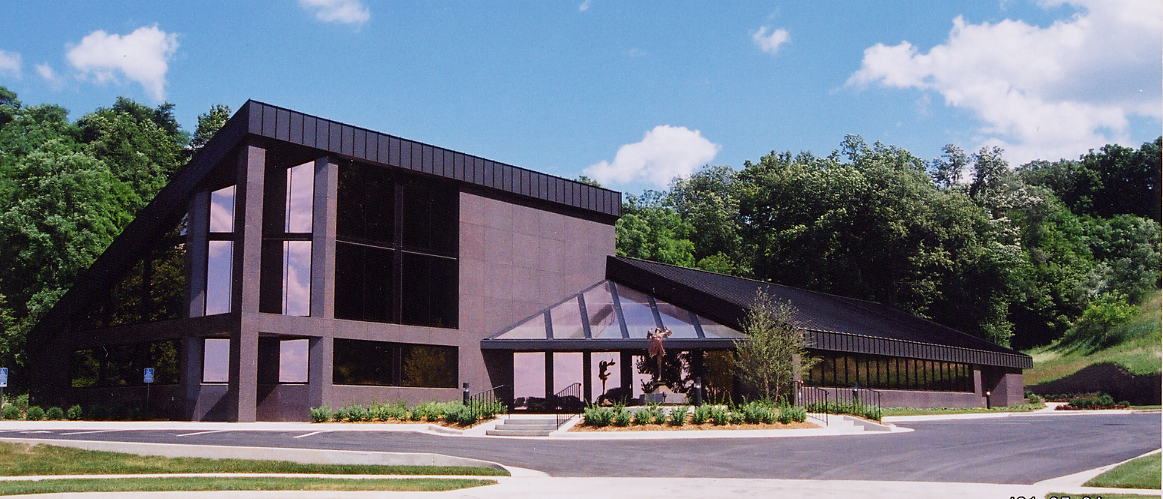
The Professional Skaters Association Headquarters in Rochester, Minnesota 2000

The American Skaters Guild, later the Professional Skaters Guild of America and then the Professional Skaters Association, was the first skating teachers organization in North America. On August 10, 1938, a meeting took place of thirteen prominent figure skating coaches from the U.S. and Canada. The meeting took place in Lake Placid, N.Y. for the purpose of forming an association of professional figure skaters. The goals of this new organization were to provide mutual protection to the coaches and the clubs employing them, and to foster better relationships with the clubs and the United States Figure Skating Association. The group discussed the formulation of a figure-skater skill classification system. Yearly dues of $5.00 were tentatively approved and officers were appointed, also temporarily. Willy Boeckl was elected President of the new organization.

The second annual meeting of the American Skaters Guild was held August 7 at the Olympic Arena, Lake Placid, N.Y. At this meeting, a motion was passed to conduct strict tests for all new skaters entering the field of instruction. The first of these tests was planned to be held at an early date at Iceland Rink in New York City.

By the 1940–41 season the guild had 43 members, most notably Walter Arian, Toronto Skating Club; Norval Baptie, Chevy Chase Ice Palace; Willy Boeckl, The Skating Club, Inc.; Willie Frick, The Skating Club of Boston; Gustav Lussi, Philadelphia Skating Club & Humane Society; Maribel Vinson Owen, East Bay Iceland; Nathan Wally, Cleveland Skating Club; and Edi Scholdan, Boston Arena.

Between 1942 and 1945, the guild was inactive as World War II was in full swing. USFSA qualifying events were still held during this period, and while the Ladies, Pairs, and Dance events were held, there were no Senior Men's events held between 1944 and 1945.

The year 1946 brought back a revival for the guild. Howard Nicholson was voted in as Chairman (President) and in 1949 a working committee was elected to reorganize the guild. Meeting in the fall, the group drew up a proposed constitution and by-laws. Included in the proposal was a name change.

== Professional Skaters Guild of America ==
On January 21, 1950, at the Broadmoor in Colorado Springs, the guild was reorganized and renamed the Professional Skaters Guild of America. The former Canadian members of the American Skaters Guild split away and created the Professional Skaters Guild of Canada.

The first “official” meeting was held during Nationals two months later in Washington, D.C., on March 25. Walter Arian served as chairman for the day. Ultimately, Edi Scholdan was appointed chairman. Maribel Vinson presented the minutes of the 1949 meeting. Also presented were reports of the sectional meetings; Freddy Mesot - Easterns, Edi Scholdan - Midwesterns, Maribel Vinson - Pacific Coast. Plans for the constitution were also discussed.

In the fall of 1950, another meeting was held. Though many topics were discussed, the most prominent resolution was to send the secretary to New York to attend a meeting of the PSGA and USFSA. Dues were raised to $20.

The first office of the PSGA was established in Colorado Springs, Colorado in 1950. Agnes Hutchinson became the secretary. Her first project was to prepare an ad and some promotional folders announcing the revival of the Guild.

Another very important program introduced was the Job Bureau. Operated by Mrs. Blanchard, it was available to members looking for new positions. This program resembles the Job Placement Directory which is still in use today by the Professional Skaters Association (PSA).

Avonelle O'Connell, wife of Bob O'Connell, president of the Guild at the time, designed the logo which was sent to Agnes Hutchinson secretary of the Guild and it was accepted as the official logo of the Professional Skaters Guild Of America. It was not designed in 1951 but in 1956.

== Professional Skaters Association (PSA) ==
In May 1995, the group once again changed its name, this time to the Professional Skaters Association, International.

In 2014, the Federal Trade Commission filed a complaint against the PSA, claiming they had violated Section 5 of the FTCA by preventing members from recruiting the students of other members. According to the complaint, the PSA instructed its members that this code provision prohibited coaches from many types of direct and indirect communications with skaters and parents, and actively enforced the ban through a variety of penalties, including suspension, even over the objections of skating students and their parents who wanted to switch coaches.

Following a public comment period, the Federal Trade Commission approved a final order in March 2015 requiring the association to cease restraining member competition, change its Code of Ethics, publicize its settlement with the FTC, and implement an antitrust compliance program.

In 2024, PSA announced that the Board of Governors proposed a member vote to dissolve the PSA. The Board claimed that, because U.S. Figure Skating no longer requires coaches to be PSA members, the PSA had no viable means to generate revenue, to produce programming or even to maintain staff. The vote to dissolve, held on May 5, 2023, was successful, with the PSA officially closing on June 30, 2024. The duties of the PSA were replaced in full by U.S. Figure Skating on July 1, 2024.

On July 1, 2024, the PSA website was taken down.
