= Karen Simensen =

Norwegian figure skater

Personal information
- Other names: Karen Klæboe
- Born: 26 August 1907 Oslo, Norway
- Died: 13 July 1996 (aged 88) Oslo, Norway

Figure skating career
- Country: Norway
- Skating club: Oslo SK
Medal record
Representing Norway
Ladies' Figure skating
World Championships
| Bronze medal – third place | 1927 Oslo | Ladies' singles |

Karen Simensen married name Klæboe (26 August 1907, in Oslo – 13 July 1996, in Oslo) was a Norwegian figure skater. She won a bronze medal at the 1927 World Figure Skating Championships, and competed at the 1928 Summer Olympics where she placed sixteenth.

== Results ==
| Event | 1927 | 1928 |
|---|---|---|
| Winter Olympics | | 16th |
| World Championships | 3rd | |
