= 1928 European Figure Skating Championships =

Figure skating competition

1928 European Championships
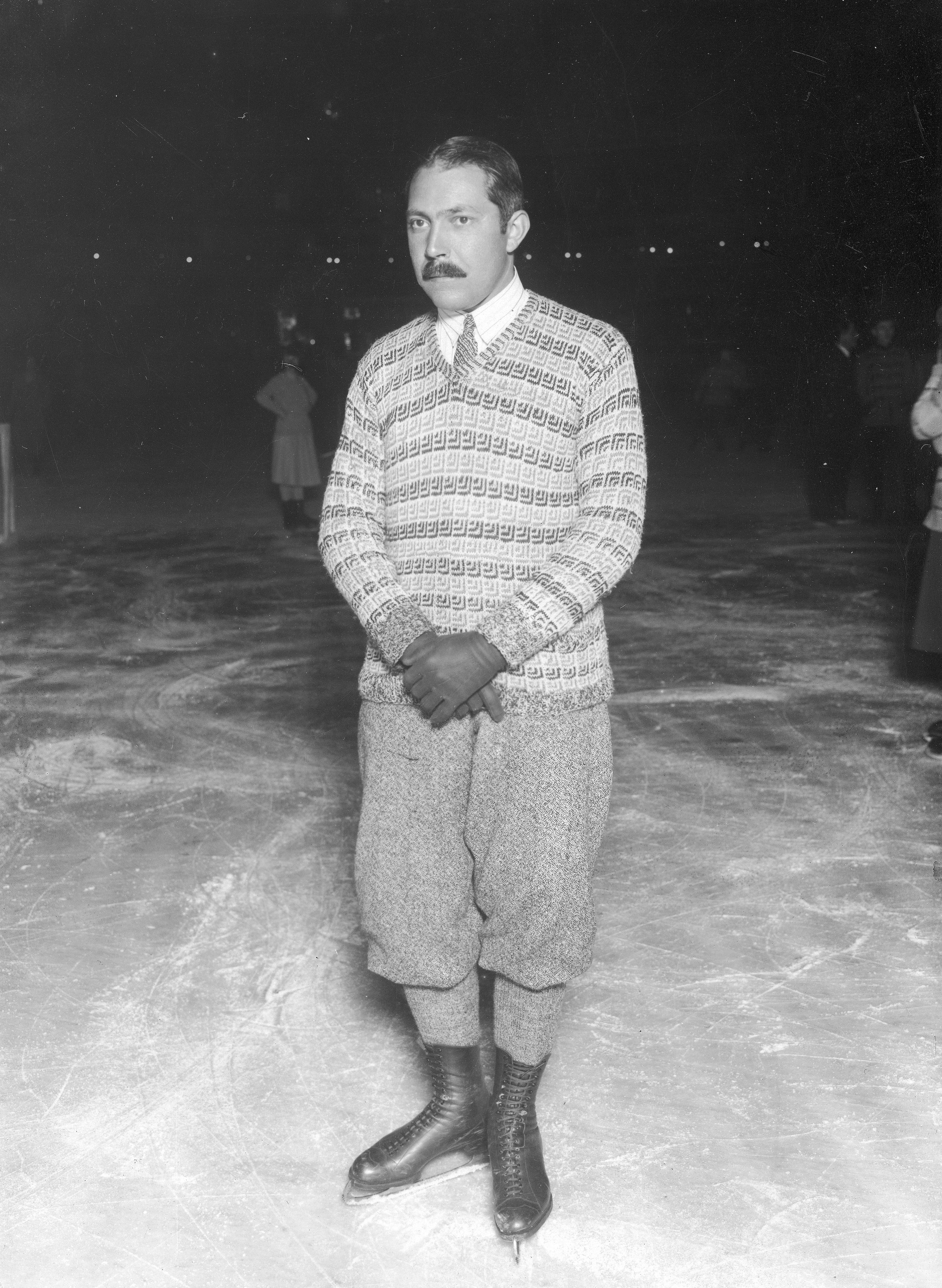
- Willy Böckl poses at the 1928 European Championships
- Type: ISU Championship
- Season: 1927–28
- Location: Opava, Czechoslovakia

Champions
- Men's singles: (Austria) Willy Böckl
- Previous: 1927 European Championships
- Next: 1929 European Championships

The 1928 European Figure Skating Championships were held in Opava, Czechoslovakia. Elite senior-level figure skaters from European ISU member nations competed for the title of European Champion in the discipline of men's singles.

== Results ==
Rank	Name	Places
1	(Austria) Willy Böckl	
2	(Austria) Karl Schäfer	
3	(Austria) Otto Preißecker	
4	(Austria) Ludwig Wrede	
5	(Czechoslovakia) Rudolf Praznowski	
6	(Czechoslovakia) Otto Zappe	
7	(Czechoslovakia) Wilhelm Czech	
