= Ian Bowhill =

British figure skater

Personal information
- Full name: Ian Home Bowhill
- Born: 27 May 1903 Edinburgh, Scotland, United Kingdom
- Died: 1975 (aged 71–72)

Figure skating career
- Country: Great Britain
- Retired: 1932

Ian Home Bowhill (27 May 1903–1975) was a Scottish figure skater. He represented Great Britain at the 1928 Winter Olympics and placed 14th.

Bowhill was 7th place at the 1929 World Championships. He also intended to compete at the 1930 World Championships as the only British skater, but he did not disembark his ship after arriving due to health issues, possibly heart problems.

His wife, Elizabeth Bowhill, was an amateur golfer and was runner-up in the 1937 Scottish Women's Amateur Championship.

== Competitive highlights ==
International
Event	1928	1929	1932
Winter Olympics	14th		
World Championships		7th	
National
British Championships			1st
