= Pierre Brunet (figure skater) =

French figure skater (1902–1991)

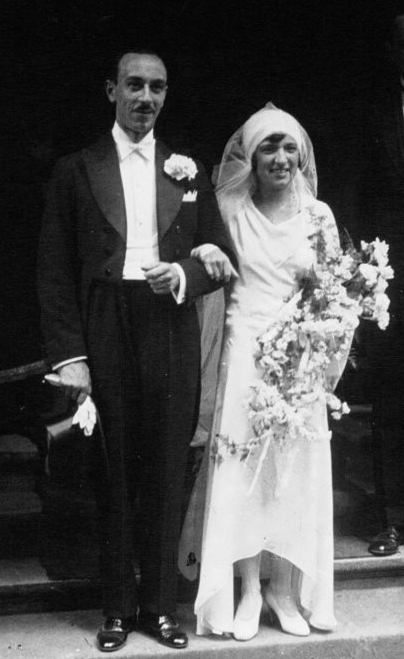
- Pierre and Andrée Brunet on their marriage day in 1929

Personal information
- Born: 28 June 1902
- Died: 27 July 1991 (aged 89)
- Height: 168 cm (5 ft 6 in)

Figure skating career
- Partner: Andrée Joly
- Retired: 1936
Medal record
Representing France
Pairs figure skating
Olympic Games
Gold medal – first place	1932 Lake Placid	Pairs
Gold medal – first place	1928 St. Moritz	Pairs
Bronze medal – third place	1924 Chamonix	Pairs
World Championships
Gold medal – first place	1932 Montreal	Pairs
Gold medal – first place	1930 New York	Pairs
Gold medal – first place	1928 London	Pairs
Gold medal – first place	1926 Berlin	Pairs
Silver medal – second place	1925 Vienna	Pairs
European Championships
Gold medal – first place	1932 Paris	Pairs

Pierre Émile Ernest Brunet (28 June 1902 – 27 July 1991) was a French figure skater. Together with his wife Andrée Brunet he won Olympic medals in 1924, 1928 and 1932, as well as four world titles between 1926 and 1932 in pair skating. He also competed in singles, winning the national title in 1924–1931 and finishing seventh-eighth at the 1924 and 1928 Winter Olympics.

== Biography ==
Brunet was born in Paris, France. He and his partner Andrée Joly were the French national champions from 1924 until 1935, and won three Olympic medals. They refused to defend their title at the 1936 Winter Olympics, however, in protest over Nazi Germany. The pair won four World Championships, competing in alternate years.

Joly and Brunet were the first French skaters to win gold medals in World, European, and Olympic competitions. They won bronze medals at the 1924 Olympic Winter Games. At the 1925 World Championships, they came in second place behind Herma Szabo and Ludwig Wrede from Austria, in what figure skating historian James M. Hines calls "one of the closest contests in pair skating history". They won every competition they entered after that: the 1932 European Championships; the World Championships in 1926, 1928, 1930, and 1932; and two Olympic titles in 1928 and 1932.

As a single skater, Brunet won ten national titles. He placed 8th (last) as a single skater at the 1924 Winter Olympics and 7th at the 1928 Winter Olympics.

Brunet and Joly were married in 1929. They had a son, Jean-Pierre, who went on to compete for the United States. He died at age 19 in an auto accident.

In 1936 they turned professional and toured Europe and Canada. In 1940 they emigrated to New York. They then became coaches, and trained future Olympic champions Carol Heiss and Scott Hamilton. They coached in New York, Illinois, and Michigan until retiring in 1979. Andrée Joly Brunet and Pierre Brunet were inducted into the World Figure Skating Hall of Fame in 1976, as part of the first class of inductees.

Pierre Brunet died in Boyne City, Michigan.

== Results ==
Men's singles

Event	1921	1922	1923	1924	1925	1926	1927	1928	1929	1930	1931
Winter Olympic Games				8th				7th			
World Championships											9th
French Championships	2nd	2nd	2nd	1st	1st		1st	1st	1st	1st	1st

Pairs (with Andrée Joly)

Event	1924	1925	1926	1927	1928	1929	1930	1931	1932	1933	1934	1935
Winter Olympic Games	3rd				1st				1st			
World Championships		2nd	1st		1st		1st		1st			
European Championships									1st			
French Championships	1st	1st	1st	1st	1st	1st	1st	1st	1st	1st		1st
