= Figure skating at the 1924 Winter Olympics =

Figure skating at the I Winter Olympics
- Type: Olympic Games

Champions
- Men's singles: (Sweden) Gillis Grafström
- Ladies' singles: (Austria) Herma Szabo
- Pairs: (Austria) Helene Engelmann / Alfred Berger
- Previous: 1920 Summer Olympics
- Next: 1928 Winter Olympics

Figure skating at the 1924 Winter Olympics took place at the Stade Olympique in Chamonix, France, from 29 to 31 January 1924. Three figure skating events were contested: men's singles, ladies' singles, and pair skating.

This was not the first time that figure skating had been contested at the Olympic Games, as the sport had previously been included on the programme at the 1908 and 1920 Summer Olympics. Gillis Grafström successfully defended his 1920 title.

At the 1924 Winter Olympics, the figure skating events were held on a square rink rather than a rectangular one, as a last-minute change. Consequently, some competitors had difficulty adjusting their free skating programs to fit the ice surface.

== Medal summary ==
=== Medalists ===
| Event | Gold | Silver | Bronze |
|---|---|---|---|
| Men's singles | Gillis Grafström (SWE) | Willy Böckl (AUT) | Georges Gautschi (SUI) |
| Ladies' singles | Herma Szabo (AUT) | Beatrix Loughran (USA) | Ethel Muckelt (GBR) |
| Pairs skating | Helene Engelmann and Alfred Berger (AUT) | Ludowika Jakobsson and Walter Jakobsson (FIN) | Andrée Joly and Pierre Brunet (FRA) |

=== Medal table ===
Only Austria was able to win more than one medal.

| Rank | Nation | Gold | Silver | Bronze | Total |
|---|---|---|---|---|---|
| 1 | Austria | 2 | 1 | 0 | 3 |
| 2 | Sweden | 1 | 0 | 0 | 1 |
| 3 | Finland | 0 | 1 | 0 | 1 |
| 3 | United States | 0 | 1 | 0 | 1 |
| 5 | France | 0 | 0 | 1 | 1 |
| 5 | Great Britain | 0 | 0 | 1 | 1 |
| 5 | Switzerland | 0 | 0 | 1 | 1 |
| Totals (7 entries) | | 3 | 3 | 3 | 9 |

== Participating nations ==
Eight figure skater competed in both the singles and the pairs event.

A total of 29 figure skaters (16 men and 13 ladies) from eleven nations (men from ten nations and ladies from eight nations) competed at the Chamonix Games:

- Austria (4) (men 2, women 2)
- Belgium (3) (men 2, women 1)
- Canada (2) (men 1, women 1)
- Czechoslovakia (1) (men 1, women 0)
- Finland (2) (men 1, women 1)
- France (5) (men 3, women 2)
- Great Britain (6) (men 3, women 3)
- Norway (1) (men 0, women 1)
- Sweden (1) (men 1, women 0)
- Switzerland (1) (men 1, women 0)
- United States (3) (men 1, women 2)
