= Otto Preißecker =

Austrian figure skater

Personal information
- Other names: Otto Preissecker
- Born: 3 August 1898 Vienna
- Died: 30 May 1963 (aged 64) Innsbruck

Figure skating career
- Country: Austria
- Partner: Gisela Hochhaltinger
- Retired: c. 1930
Medal record
Representing Austria
Figure skating
World Championships
| Silver medal – second place | 1926 Berlin | Men's singles |
| Silver medal – second place | 1927 Davos | Men's singles |
| Bronze medal – third place | 1925 Vienna | Men's singles |
European Championships
| Silver medal – second place | 1926 Davos | Men's singles |
| Bronze medal – third place | 1925 Triberg | Men's singles |
| Bronze medal – third place | 1928 Troppau | Men's singles |
| Bronze medal – third place | 1930 Vienna | Pairs |

Otto Preißecker also Preissecker (3 August 1898 – 30 May 1963) was an Austrian figure skater who competed in men's singles and pairs. As a single skater, he became a three-time World medalist (silver in 1926 and 1927, bronze in 1925), a three-time European medalist (silver in 1926, bronze in 1925 and 1928), and a three-time national champion (1926–1928). As a pair skater with Gisela Hochhaltinger, he was the 1930 European bronze medalist and a two-time national silver medalist.

== Results ==
=== Men's singles ===
International
| Event | 1923 | 1924 | 1925 | 1926 | 1927 | 1928 |
|---|---|---|---|---|---|---|
| World Championships | | 6th | 3rd | 2nd | 2nd | |
| European Championships | | 4th | 3rd | 2nd | | 3rd |
National
| Austrian Championships | 3rd | | 3rd | 1st | 1st | 1st |

=== Pairs with Hochhaltinger ===
International
| Event | 1929 | 1930 |
|---|---|---|
| World Championships | 4th | |
| European Championships | | 3rd |
National
| Austrian Championships | 2nd | 2nd |
