= Grete Kubitschek =

Austrian figure skater

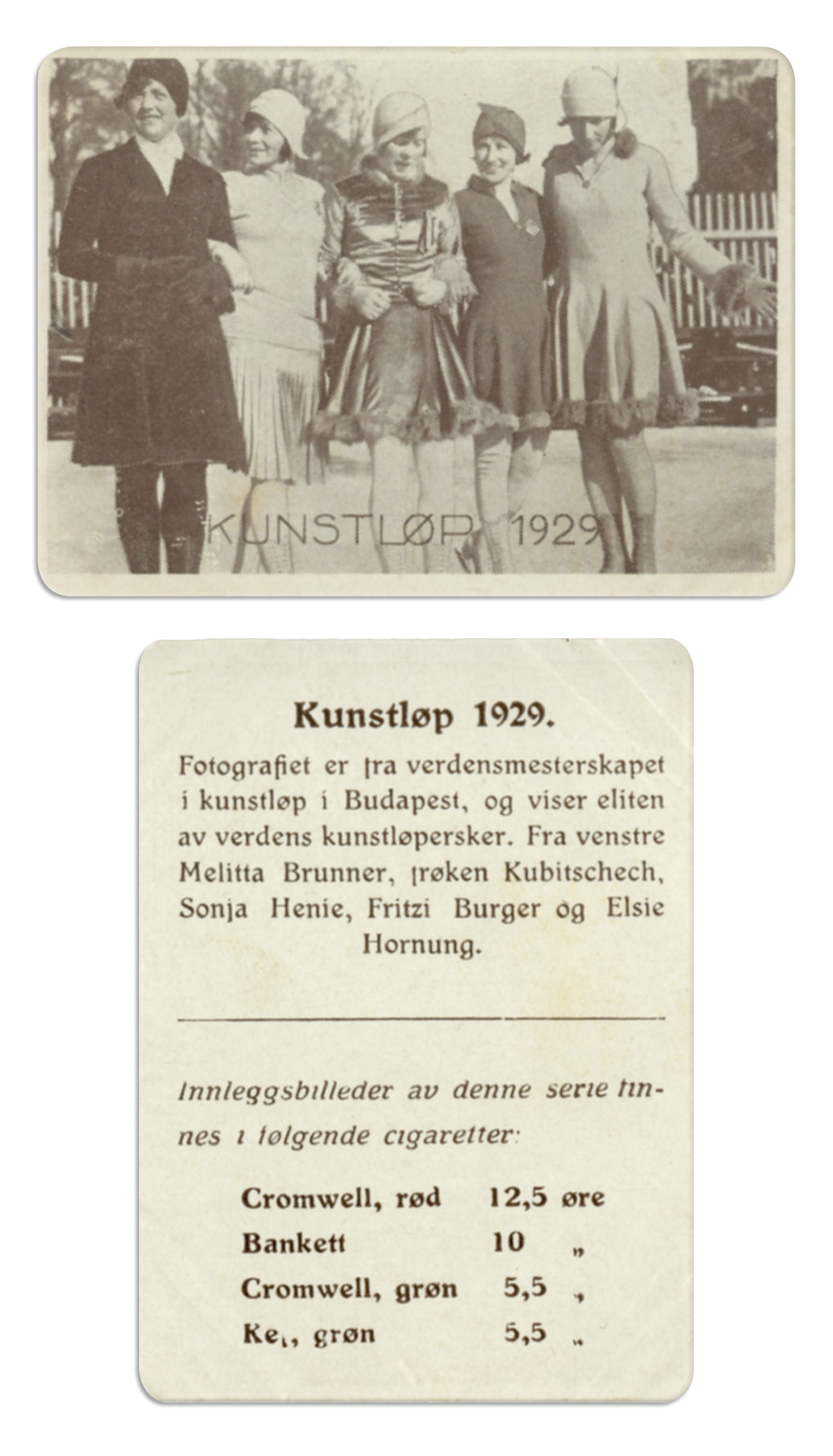

Personal information
- Born: 1903

Figure skating career
- Country: Austria-Hungary

Grete Kubitschek (born 1903, date of death unknown) was an Austrian figure skater. She competed in the women's singles event at the 1928 Winter Olympics.
