= Gillis Grafström =

Swedish figure skater (1893-1938)

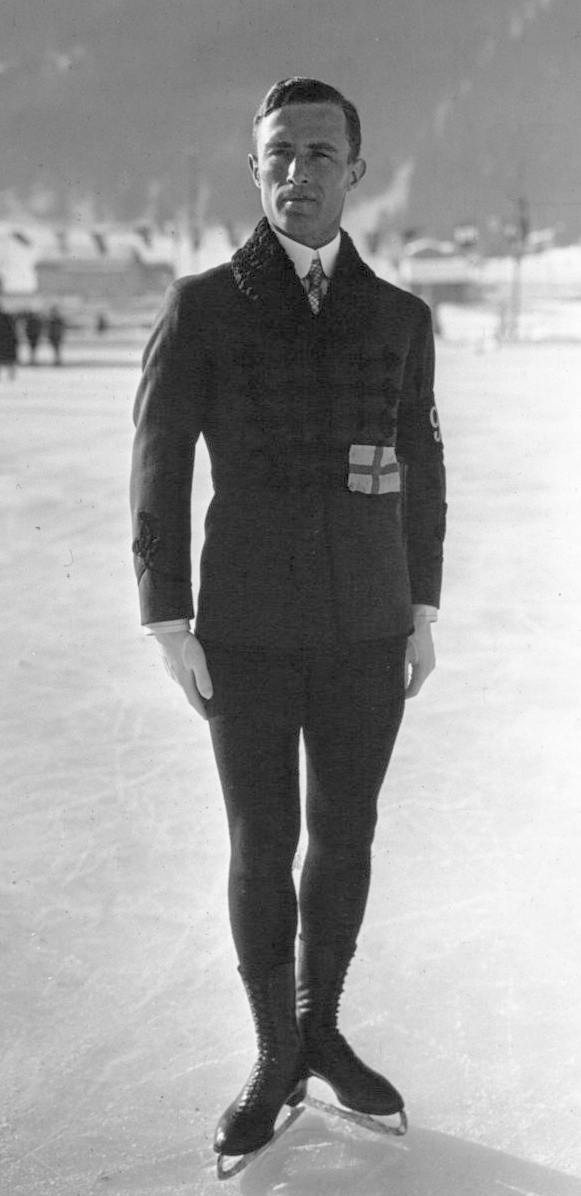
- Gillis Grafström in 1924

Personal information
- Full name: Gillis Emanuel Grafström
- Born: 7 June 1893 Stockholm, Sweden
- Died: 14 April 1938 (aged 44) Potsdam, Germany
Medal record
Men's Figure skating
Representing Sweden
Olympic Games
Gold medal – first place	1920 Antwerp	Men's singles
Gold medal – first place	1924 Chamonix	Men's singles
Gold medal – first place	1928 St. Moritz	Men's singles
Silver medal – second place	1932 Lake Placid	Men's singles
World Championships
Gold medal – first place	1922 Stockholm	Men's singles
Gold medal – first place	1924 Manchester	Men's singles
Gold medal – first place	1929 London	Men's singles

Gillis Emanuel Grafström (7 June 1893 – 14 April 1938) was a Swedish figure skater. He was born in Stockholm, Sweden. He won three successive Olympic gold medals in Men's Figure Skating (1920, 1924, 1928) as well as an Olympic silver medal in the same event in 1932, and three World Championships (1922, 1924, 1929). Grafström is one of the few athletes who have competed in both the Summer and Winter Olympic games. He and Eddie Eagan are the only athletes to have won gold medals at both the Summer and Winter Olympic Games, although Eagan remains the only one to have managed the feat in different disciplines. He is one of the oldest figure skating Olympic champions.

== Biography ==
Grafström was born in Stockholm; his younger brother Lars Grafström was also a competitive figure skater and Swedish national champion. Gillis Grafström competed in his only European Championships in 1912 and won the "senior men's" category, separate from the European champion category. He began studying at KTH Royal Institute of Technology that same year. In 1914, Grafström competed at the last World Championships before the first world war. He came in seventh place after falling and hitting his head. While the war was ongoing, he won the men's competition at the 1917 Nordic Games.

After the war, Grafström won the Olympic gold medal for the first of three successive times (1920, 1924 and 1928) and the silver medal at the 1932 Winter Olympics. As of the 2022 Olympics, he remains the only male figure skater to have won three individual Olympic gold medals (Sonja Henie and Irina Rodnina are other three-time Olympic Champions), and with his silver medal in 1932, is the most successful figure skater in Olympic history. At his first Olympics in Antwerp one of his skates broke, and he had to go to town to buy a new pair. Unfortunately, only curly-toed skates were available. Despite this, he was still able to win.

He competed in and won three World Championships in 1922, 1924, 1929, competing only intermittently between editions of Olympic Games. At his first World Championships in 1922, he fell during the compulsory figures. However, he performed so well in the free program that he was able to move into first place. In 1924, he traveled to the location of the competition, Manchester, at the last minute and skated in an exhibition before competing. Although he had won, when he needed money afterward, the Swedish federation refused his request for help; Grafström informed his club that at future competitions, he would enter as an individual rather than as a representative of Sweden.

Grafström intended to compete at the 1926 World Championships. However, a document he needed to compete there was only approved by a narrow 3-2 vote, and he decided not to enter. Ulrich Salchow was unhappy with this decision, and Grafström was banned from both competitions and exhibition skating for one year. He continued training despite the ban and entered the 1928 Winter Olympics. Although he had an injured knee, he was second after the compulsory figures and won with his free skate.

In 1929, he was awarded the Svenska Dagbladet Gold Medal, shared with skier Sven Utterström.

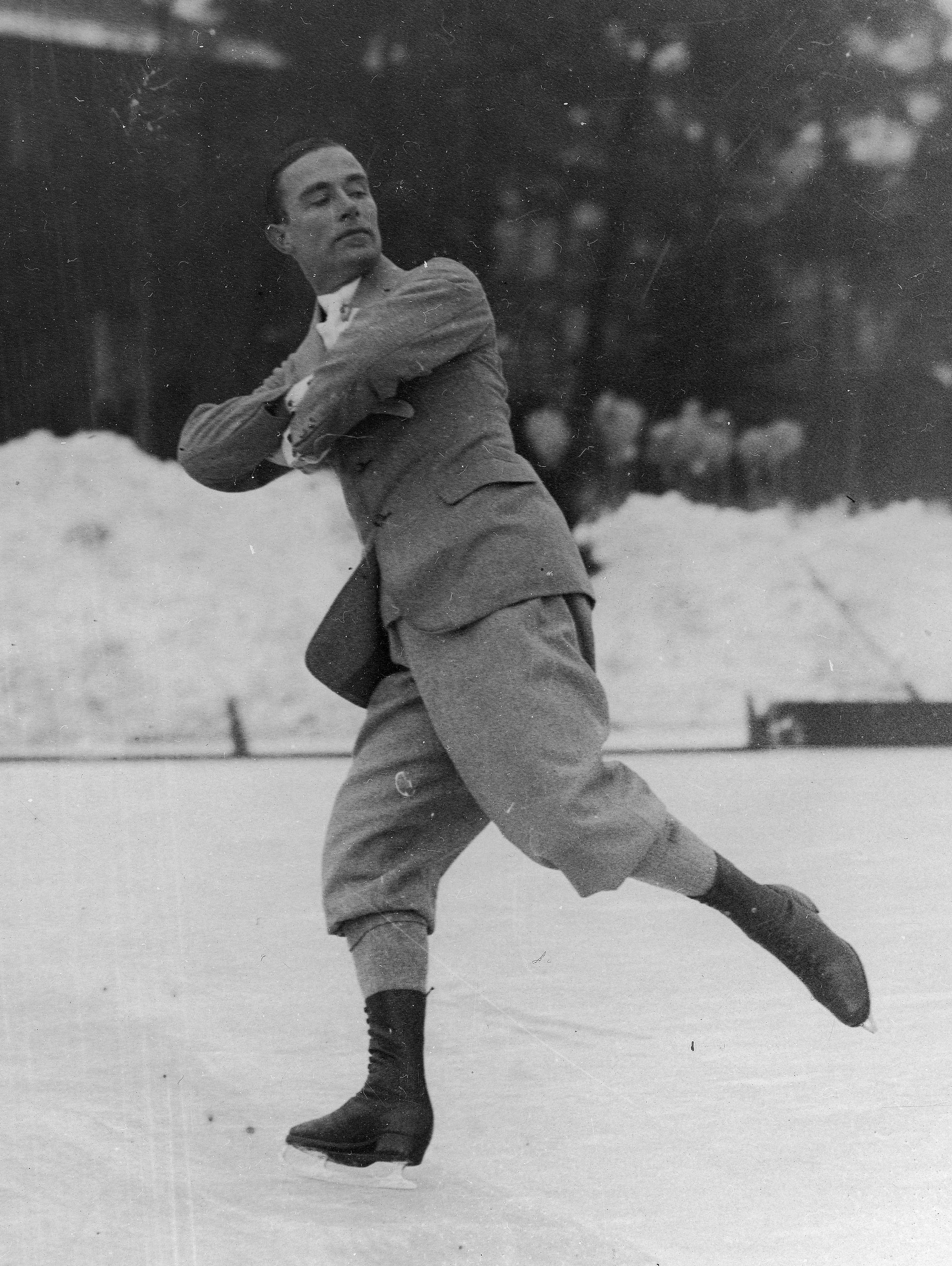
Grafström in 1929

At his last Olympics in 1932 in Lake Placid, he collided with a photographer on the ice and still managed to place second. He later coached Norwegian figure skater Sonja Henie.

Grafström was one of the best skaters ever in compulsory figures and also had an interest in special figures. Despite the fact that they were no longer competed after WWII, he created more than fifty special figure designs, some of which were used for English figure tests. He also invented the Grafström-pirouette (on the back outside edge of the blade) and the flying sit spin. He was known for very elegant skating and was famous for his interpretation of music.

From 1925 to his death he lived in Potsdam, Germany. He trained on the Bornstedter See (Bornstedt Lake) when it was frozen or in Berlin on the artificial ice rink at the Volkspark Friedrichshain. Grafström studied architecture at the Technische Hochschule in Charlottenburg (now Technische Universität Berlin) and worked later as an architect. He collected graphics, paintings and sculptures about skating. This collection was continued by his wife Cecilie Mendelssohn-Bartholdy (1898–1995). Today this collection belongs to the World Figure Skating Museum in Colorado Springs in the United States. Grafström was also a writer and an etcher.

Grafström married in February 1938. Just two months later, he died in Potsdam, Germany, at the age of 44, of heart muscle inflammation, although his cause of death has often been reported as blood-poisoning.

Today there is a street in Potsdam named after him. In 1976 he was admitted to the World Figure Skating Hall of Fame.

== Results ==
Event	1912	1913	1914	1915	1916	1917	1918	1919	1920	1921	1922	1923	1924	1925	1926	1927	1928	1929	1930	1931	1932
Summer Olympics									1st												
Winter Olympics													1st				1st				2nd
World Championships			7th								1st		1st					1st			
Nordic Championships									1st												
Swedish Championships	2nd					1st	1st	1st													

== See also ==
- List of Olympic medalists in figure skating
- World Figure Skating Championships
- List of Olympians who won medals in the Summer and Winter Games

Preceded by Per-Erik Hedlund	Svenska Dagbladet Gold Medal with Sven Utterström; 1929	Succeeded by Johan Richthoff
