= Hugo Distler (figure skater) =

Austrian figure skater

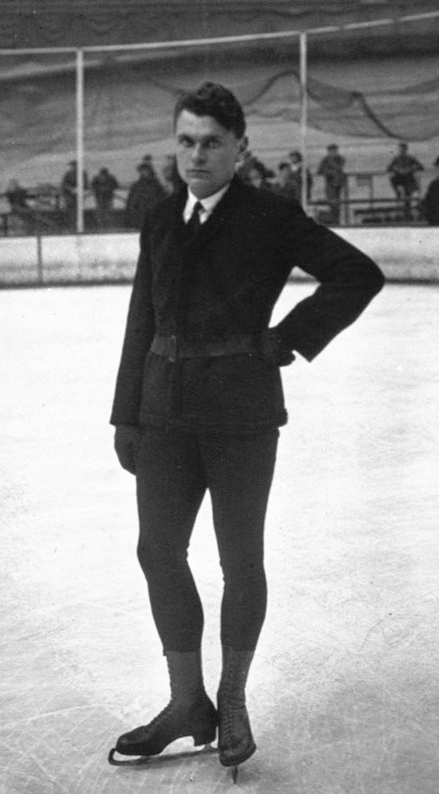
- Hugo Distler at the 1932 European Championships
Medal record
Representing Austria
Men's Figure skating
World Championships
Bronze medal – third place	1928 Berlin	Men's singles
European Championships
Silver medal – second place	1927 Vienna	Men's singles
Bronze medal – third place	1931 St. Moritz	Men's singles

Hugo Distler was an Austrian figure skater who competed in men's singles. In 1928 he won a bronze at the world championships. He also earned a European silver in 1927 and a bronze in 1931.

== Results ==
International
Event	1924	1926	1927	1928	1929	1930	1931	1932
World Championships				3rd	5th		4th	
European Championships		7th	2nd				3rd	4th
National
Austrian Championships	3rd			3rd		2nd	2nd	
