= Ethel Muckelt =

British figure skater

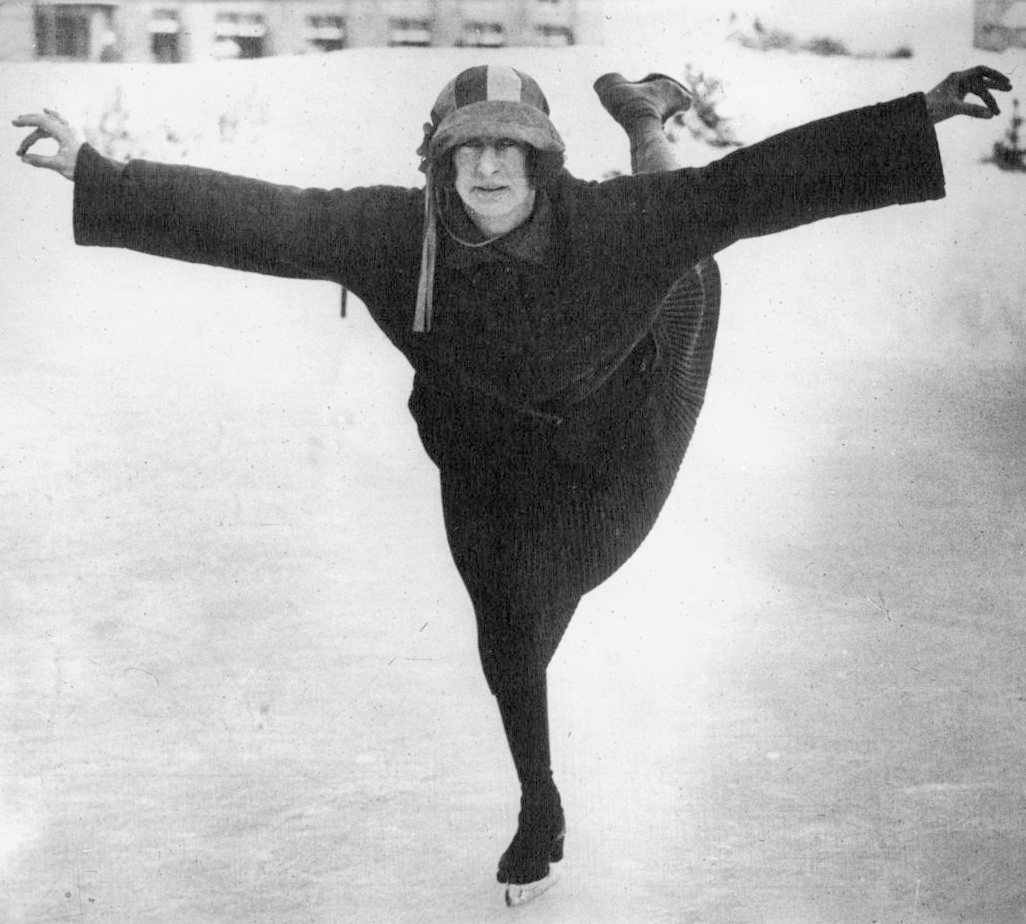
- Ethel Muckelt in 1924

Personal information
- Born: 30 May 1885 Moss Side, Lancashire, England
- Died: 13 December 1953 (aged 68) Altrincham, Trafford, Cheshire, England

Figure skating career
- Country: United Kingdom
Medal record
Representing Great Britain
Olympic Games
Bronze medal – third place	1924 Chamonix	Singles
World Championships
Silver medal – second place	1924 Manchester	Pairs

Ethel Muckelt (30 May 1885 – 13 December 1953) was a British figure skater who competed in singles and pairs. As a single skater, she won the bronze medal at the 1924 Winter Olympics. As a pair skater, she placed fifth at the 1920 Summer Olympics with Sydney Wallwork. With John Page, she won the silver medal at the 1924 World Figure Skating Championships and placed fourth at that year's Olympics.

Muckelt came from a family of prosperous dye manufacturers. She was one of the oldest Winter Olympics medallists, as she was 38 in 1924, and she continued competing into her fifties.

== Competitive highlights ==
=== Ladies' singles ===
Event	1921	1922	1923	1924	1925	1927
Olympic Games				3rd		
World Championships			4th		5th	
British Championships	3rd	2nd	2nd			2nd

=== Pairs with Wallwork ===
Event	1920
Olympic Games	5th

=== Pairs with Page ===
Event	1924	1926	1927	1928
Olympic Games	4th			7th
World Championships	2nd	6th		4th
