= Gisela Hochhaltinger =

Austrian pair skater

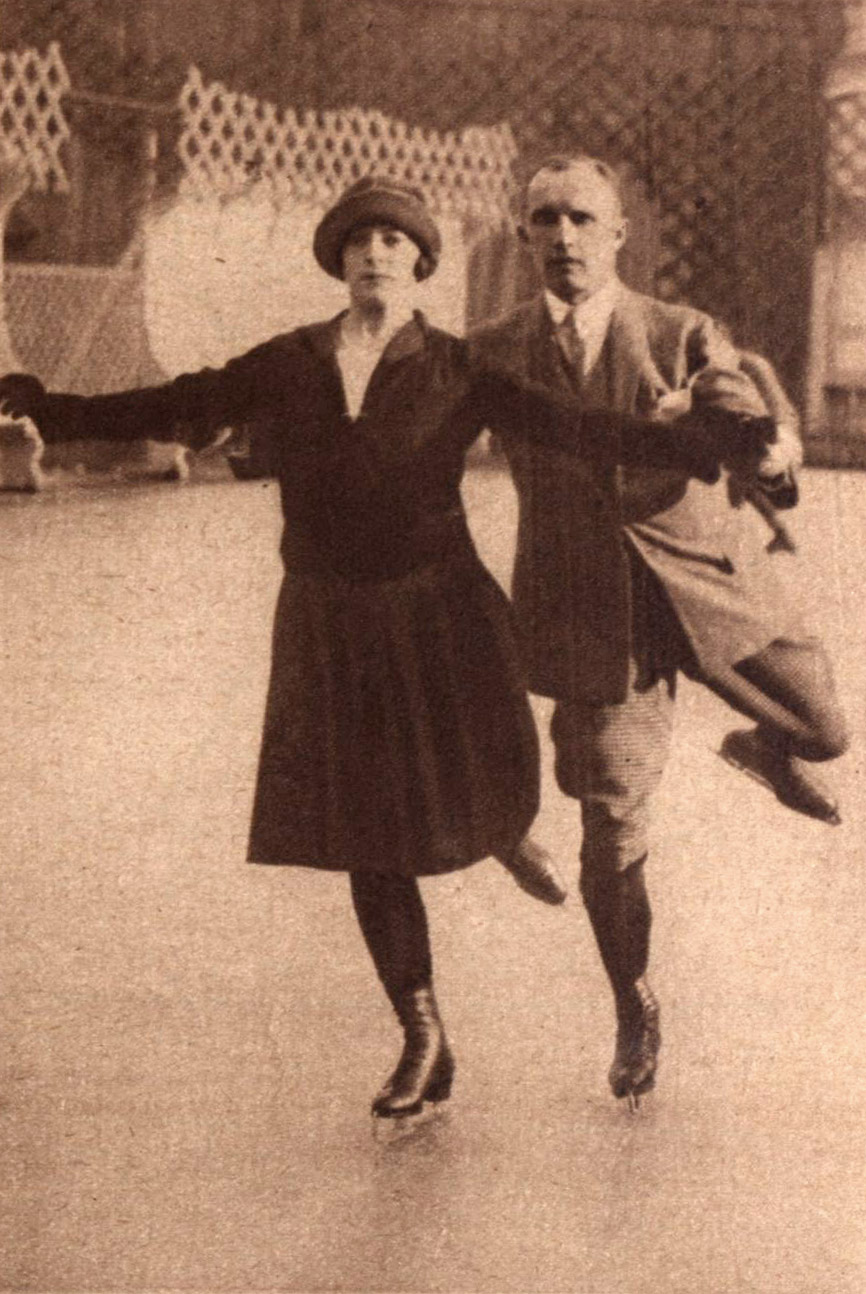
- Gisela Hochhaltinger (left) and Georg Pamperl (right) skating together in 1926.

Figure skating career
- Country: Austria
Medal record
Representing Austria
Figure skating: Pairs
European Championships
Bronze medal – third place	1930 Vienna	Pairs

Gisela Hochhaltinger was an Austrian figure skater who competed in pair skating.

With partner Otto Preißecker, she won the bronze medal at the 1930 European Figure Skating Championships.

== Competitive highlights ==
=== With Otto Preißecker ===
International
Event	1929	1930
World Championships	4th	
European Championships		3rd
National
Austrian Championships	2nd	2nd

=== With Georg Pamperl ===
International
Event	1924	1925	1926
World Championships		4th	4th
National
Austrian Championships	2nd		
