= Karl Schäfer (figure skater) =

Austrian figure skater

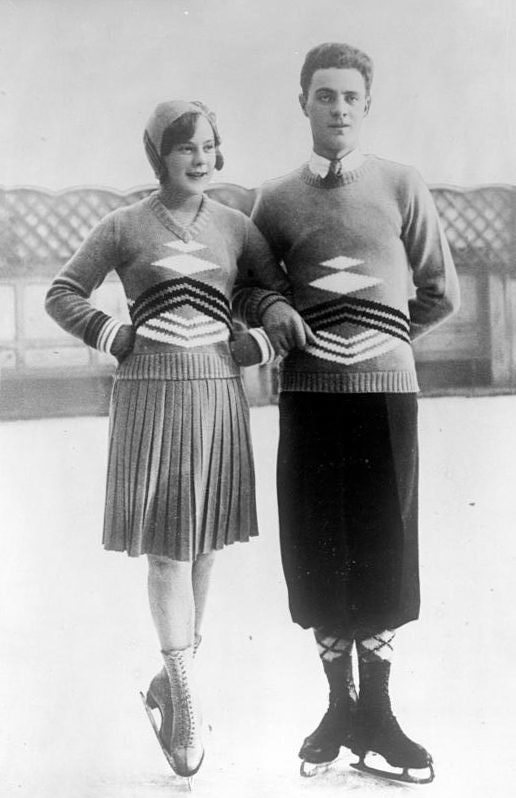
- Karl Schäfer with Sonja Henie

Personal information
- Full name: Karl Schäfer
- Born: 17 May 1909 Vienna, Austria-Hungary
- Died: 23 April 1976 (aged 66) Vienna, Austria

Figure skating career
- Country: Austria
Medal record
Representing Austria
Men's Figure skating
Olympic Games
Gold medal – first place	1936 Garmisch-Partenkirchen	Men's singles
Gold medal – first place	1932 Lake Placid	Men's singles
World Championships
Gold medal – first place	1936 Paris	Men's singles
Gold medal – first place	1935 Budapest	Men's singles
Gold medal – first place	1934 Stockholm	Men's singles
Gold medal – first place	1933 Zürich	Men's singles
Gold medal – first place	1932 Montreal	Men's singles
Gold medal – first place	1931 Berlin	Men's singles
Gold medal – first place	1930 New York	Men's singles
Silver medal – second place	1929 London	Men's singles
Silver medal – second place	1928 Berlin	Men's singles
Bronze medal – third place	1927 Davos	Men's singles
European Championships
Gold medal – first place	1936 Berlin	Men's singles
Gold medal – first place	1935 St. Moritz	Men's singles
Gold medal – first place	1934 Prague	Men's singles
Gold medal – first place	1933 London	Men's singles
Gold medal – first place	1932 Paris	Men's singles
Gold medal – first place	1931 St. Moritz	Men's singles
Gold medal – first place	1930 Vienna	Men's singles
Gold medal – first place	1929 Davos	Men's singles
Silver medal – second place	1928 Troppau	Men's singles
Bronze medal – third place	1927 Vienna	Men's singles

Karl Schäfer (17 May 1909 – 23 April 1976) was an Austrian figure skater and swimmer. In figure skating, he became a two-time Olympic champion at the 1932 Winter Olympics and the 1936 Winter Olympics. He was also a seven-time World champion (1930–1936) and eight-time European champion (1929–1936). As a swimmer, he competed at the 1928 Summer Olympics in the 200 metre breaststroke.

== Early life and skating career ==
Karl Schäfer, at times also called "Karli", was born not far from the artificial ice rink of Eduard Engelmann Jr. in Vienna-Hernals. Figure skating coach Rudolf Kutzer first recognized Schäfer's talent when he was 11 years old.

Schäfer in 1930 on the ice

Schäfer won ten consecutive medals at the World Championships and European Championships, including seven and eight consecutive gold medals respectively, an all-time high for consecutive titles in both competitions (Sweden's Ulrich Salchow holds the record for all-time non-consecutive titles, ten World and nine European titles). He competed at the 1928 Winter Olympics and placed 4th, and he won his first European title at the 1929 European Championships. Starting in 1930, Schäfer entered and won every major competition until his retirement after the 1936 season, including back-to-back Olympic titles in men's singles at the 1932 Winter Olympics and the 1936 Winter Olympics.

Schäfer retired from competitive skating in 1936. He moved for a couple of years to the United States, where he worked as a coach. He also performed in ice shows and published a book on compulsory figures that included small flip books of photos taken from film of Schäfer performing figures. In 1938, he opened a sport store in Vienna.

In 1940, he and Herta Wächter (also a figure skating coach) founded the "Karl-Schäfer-Eisrevue" (Karl Schäfer Ice Revue). In 1943, Schäfer became an actor and was the star of the movie The White Dream, which was produced on Engelmann's ice rink in Vienna-Hernals. Fellow Austrian skater Willy Petter played a key part in the revue and did much of the choreography; however, he was not credited and remained in background roles, as he was not considered completely Aryan by Nazi standards, a fact that Schäfer helped cover.

After World War II, Schäfer participated in rebuilding the Engelmann's ice rink, and from 1946 on he coached young skaters there. In 1949, he ran into legal problems when he was accused of having been a member of the Nazi Party since 1933 and a member of the Sturmabteilung since 1938, despite having said in 1945 that he had joined the Nazi Party only in 1938 and been part of the Sturmabteilung for just three weeks. He presented witnesses who stated that he was part of the resistance movement from 1940 onward, which resulted in his expulsion from the Sturmabteilung, and also against accusations of having participated in Aryanization. His reputation was damaged by the trial, and he was forced to resign as director of his ice revue, which dropped his name from its title. Schäfer stated in 1954 that he had never been politically active, but after the Anschluss in 1938, he was incorporated into the Sturmabteilung like other well-known athletes.

He moved again to the U.S. in 1956 and worked there as a figure skating coach until 1962. In 1962, he returned as a coach to Vienna-Hernals and lived and worked there until he died.

A street in Vienna is named for him. The Karl Schäfer Memorial was a figure skating competition named after him that was held in Vienna from 1974 to 2008.

== Swimming career ==
Schäfer was the Austrian breaststroke champion several times. He competed in the 1928 Summer Olympics and was eliminated in the semi-finals of the 200 metre breaststroke event. Schäfer also attempted to compete at the 1936 Summer Olympics, but he was not able to do so after suffering burns from handling the Olympic flame.

== Personal life ==
Schäfer played the violin very well.

He married Christine Engelmann, the youngest daughter of Eduard Engelmann Jr., making him the brother-in-law of Helene Engelmann.

== Results ==
=== Figure skating ===
International
Event	1927	1928	1929	1930	1931	1932	1933	1934	1935	1936
Winter Olympics		4th				1st				1st
World Championships	3rd	2nd	2nd	1st	1st	1st	1st	1st	1st	1st
European Championships	3rd	2nd	1st	1st	1st	1st	1st	1st	1st	1st
National
Austrian Championships	2nd	2nd	1st	1st	1st	1st	1st	1st		1st
