= Willy Böckl =

Austrian figure skater (1893–1975)

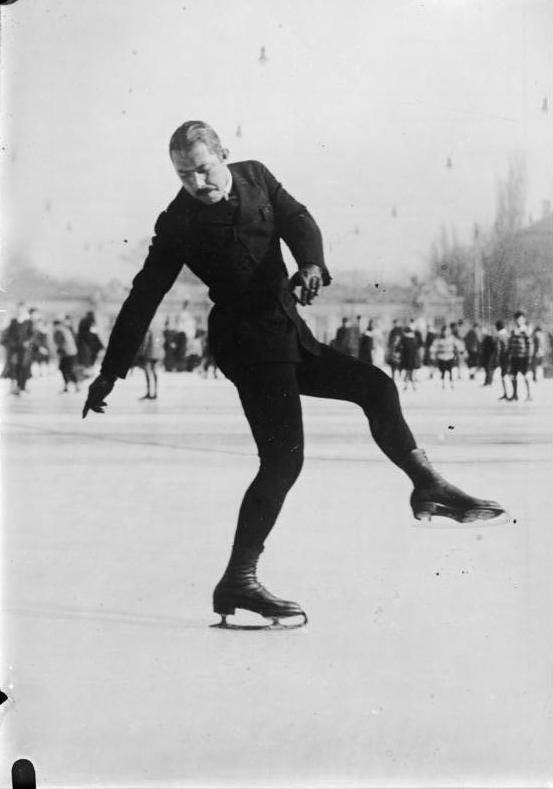
- Böckl in 1928

Personal information
- Full name: Wilhelm Richard Böckl
- Other names: William Boeckl
- Born: 27 January 1893 Klagenfurt, Austria
- Died: 22 April 1975 (aged 82) Klagenfurt, Austria

Figure skating career
- Country: Austria
Medal record
Representing Austria
Men's Figure skating
Olympic Games
Silver medal – second place	1924 Chamonix	Men's singles
Silver medal – second place	1928 St. Moritz	Men's singles
World Championships
Gold medal – first place	1925 Vienna	Men's singles
Gold medal – first place	1926 Berlin	Men's singles
Gold medal – first place	1927 Davos	Men's singles
Gold medal – first place	1928 Berlin	Men's singles
Silver medal – second place	1913 Vienna	Men's singles
Silver medal – second place	1923 Stockholm	Men's singles
Silver medal – second place	1924 Stockholm	Men's singles
Bronze medal – third place	1914 Helsinki	Men's singles
Bronze medal – third place	1922 Stockholm	Men's singles
European Championships
Gold medal – first place	1922 Stockholm	Men's singles
Gold medal – first place	1923 Stockholm	Men's singles
Gold medal – first place	1925 Triberg	Men's singles
Gold medal – first place	1926 Davos	Men's singles
Gold medal – first place	1927 Vienna	Men's singles
Gold medal – first place	1928 Troppau	Men's singles
Bronze medal – third place	1913 Oslo	Men's singles
Bronze medal – third place	1914 Vienna	Men's singles

Wilhelm Richard Böckl (or Boeckl; 27 January 1893 – 22 April 1975) was an Austrian figure skater.

== Career ==
In his career, Böckl won the World Figure Skating Championships four times and captured two silver medals at the Winter Olympics, and he also won six European Championship titles. After the end of World War I, beginning in 1922, he won the European championships six times, except for 1924, when he did not compete. Also in 1922, he came in third place at the World Championships. He came in second place at the 1923 and 1924 World Championships, and then between 1925 and 1928, won the next four Worlds. He earned two silver medals at the Olympics in 1924 and 1928, both behind Swedish skater Gillis Grafström. He defeated Grafström in the free skating portion at the 1924 Olympics.

The invention of the inside Axel jump (an Axel jump taking off from an inside edge rather than the normal outside edge) has been credited to Böckl and called the "Böckl jump".

After retiring from skating, Böckl moved to the United States and became a coach at the Skating Club of New York. In 1937, he published an illustrated instructional book, Willy Boeckl on Figure Skating, which included descriptions of compulsory figures and free skating, but also included chapters on pair skating, ice dance, and carnival (ice show) skating. He published a second book in 1940, How to Judge Figure Skating, which was primarily about judging compulsory figures.

In 1938, Böckl was one of thirteen prominent figure skating instructors from the United States and Canada, who met in Lake Placid, New York, for the purpose of forming an association of figure skating instructors. This distinguished group became known as the American Skaters Guild (the name was later changed to the Professional Skaters Guild of America in 1950, and again to the current name of the Professional Skaters Association). Willy became the first president of the guild; Willie Frick its first vice-president, and Walter Arian, second vice-president.

Böckl announced a retirement from coaching in 1944 to work as president of a tire company. He continued to be involved in skating and lead an ice show tour in Europe in 1953. After retiring, Boeckl moved to Phoenix, Arizona. Following the death of his wife, he returned to Kleganfurt, dying there on 22 April 1975, aged 82. He was elected into the World Figure Skating Hall of Fame in 1977.

== Results ==
International
Event	1913	1914	1920	1921	1922	1923	1924	1925	1926	1927	1928
Winter Olympics							2nd				2nd
World Championships	2nd	3rd			3rd	2nd	2nd	1st	1st	1st	1st
European Championships	3rd	3rd			1st	1st		1st	1st	1st	1st
National
Austrian Championships	1st	1st	1st	2nd			1st	2nd			
