= Herma Szabo =

Austrian figure skater (1902–1986)

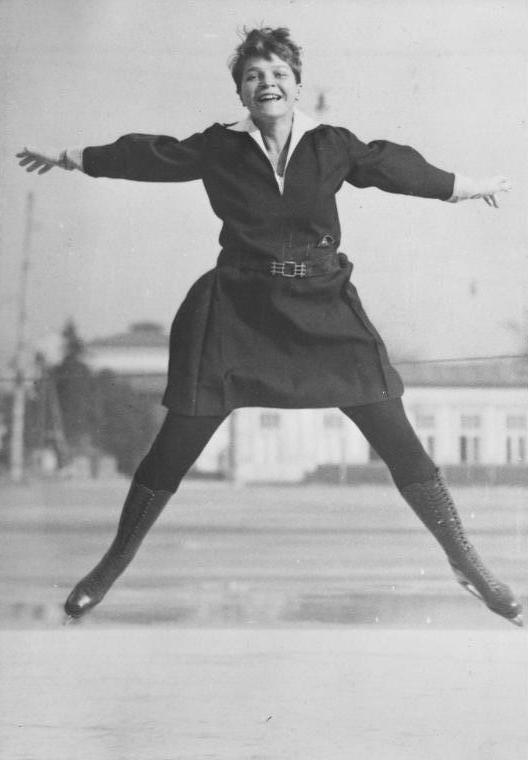
- Szabo in 1926

Personal information
- Born: 22 February 1902 Vienna, Austria-Hungary
- Died: 7 May 1986 (aged 84) Admont, Austria

Figure skating career
- Country: Austria
- Partner: Ludwig Wrede
- Retired: 1928
Medal record
Figure skating
Representing Austria
Olympic Games
Gold medal – first place	1924 Chamonix	Ladies' singles
World Championships
Gold medal – first place	1927 Vienna	Pairs
Gold medal – first place	1926 Stockholm	Ladies' singles
Gold medal – first place	1925 Davos	Ladies' singles
Gold medal – first place	1925 Vienna	Pairs
Gold medal – first place	1924 Oslo	Ladies' singles
Gold medal – first place	1923 Vienna	Ladies' singles
Gold medal – first place	1922 Davos	Ladies' singles
Silver medal – second place	1927 Oslo	Ladies' singles
Bronze medal – third place	1926 Berlin	Pairs

Herma Szabo (22 February 1902 – 7 May 1986) was an Austrian figure skater who competed in ladies' singles and pairs. As a single skater, she became the 1924 Olympic champion and a five-time world champion (1922–1926). She also won two world titles in pairs with Ludwig Wrede.

== Personal life ==
Szabo was born in Vienna, where she came from a family of figure skaters. Her mother was Christa von Szabo, a two-time world medalist in pairs figure skating and her uncle was Eduard Engelmann Jr., a three time European Champion in men's figure skating, who built the first artificial ice rink. As a result, Szabo was exposed to the sport at a young age, where she practiced at her uncle's ice rink along with her cousins Helene Engelmann and Christine Engelmann, who went on to marry Karl Schäfer.

== Career ==
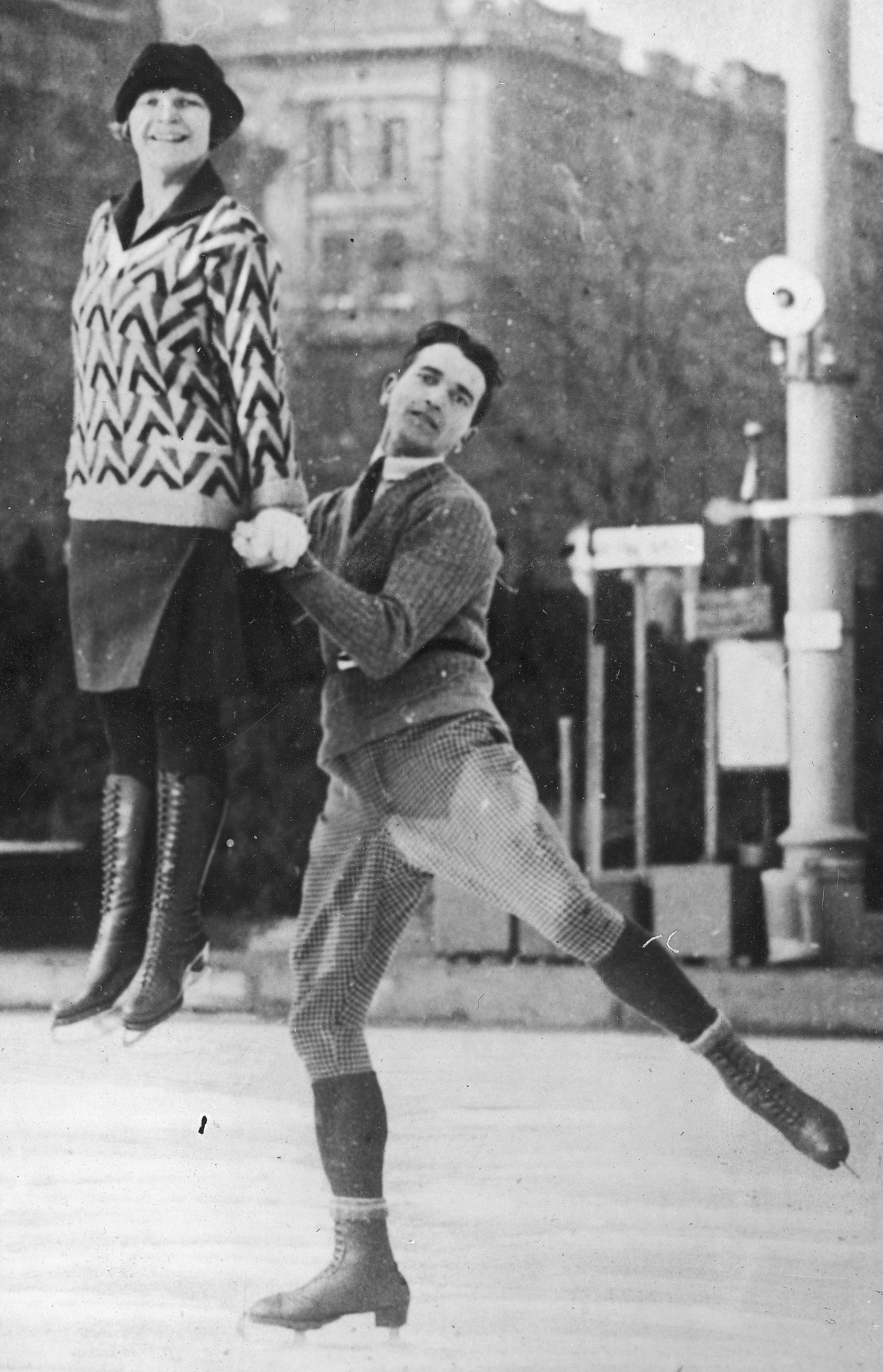
Szabo performing a lift with Wrede in 1927

She competed as a figure skater under different surnames, which include von Szabó, Plank-Szabo, Planck-Szabo, Jarosz-Szabo and Jaross-Szabo. The International Skating Union uses the surname Szabo to refer to her accomplishments. Szabo won the gold medal at the 1924 Winter Olympics in ladies figure skating. At the Olympics, she helped modernize ladies's figure skating by wearing a skirt cut above the knee. High-cut skirts allowed for more freedom of movement in the legs. Despite this, Sonja Henie is usually credited with being the first to wear short skirts in competition.

Szabo did not compete in the Europeans because the ladies and pair events were not established until 1930. However, she won five consecutive world titles in ladies' figure skating from 1922 to 1926. She is one of four women to have won the World title five times, the others being Sonja Henie, Carol Heiss, and Michelle Kwan.

In addition, she was also an early pioneer in pairs figure skating, where she competed with Ludwig Wrede. They won the World title twice, in 1925 and 1927, and placed third in 1926. She is the only skater to hold a simultaneous world titles in pairs and singles.

With her achievements, she is regarded as one of the most decorated figure skaters in history.

== Retirement ==
She retired in 1927 after she was defeated by Sonja Henie of Norway at the World Championships. This result was controversial because the judging panel consisted of three Norwegians, a German, and an Austrian. The three Norwegian judges placed Henie first, while the German and Austrian judges placed Szabo first.

She became disillusioned with the sport and never skated competitively again. Henie offered her a rematch years later, but she refused to participate. Her abrupt retirement, led her partner Wrede, to find a different partner for the 1928 Olympic Games, but not with the same success.

Despite the bitter end to her career, Szabo was inducted into the World Figure Skating Hall of Fame in 1982. She died at age 84 in Rottenmann, Styria.

== Results ==
=== Ladies' singles ===
International
Event	1918	1922	1923	1924	1925	1926	1927
Winter Olympics				1st			
World Championships		1st	1st	1st	1st	1st	2nd
National
Austrian Championships	2nd	1st	1st	1st	1st		1st

=== Pairs with Ludwig Wrede ===
International
Event	1925	1926	1927
World Championships	1st	3rd	1st
National
Austrian Championships	1st	1st	

== See also ==
- List of Austrians in sports
