= John Page (figure skater) =

British figure skater

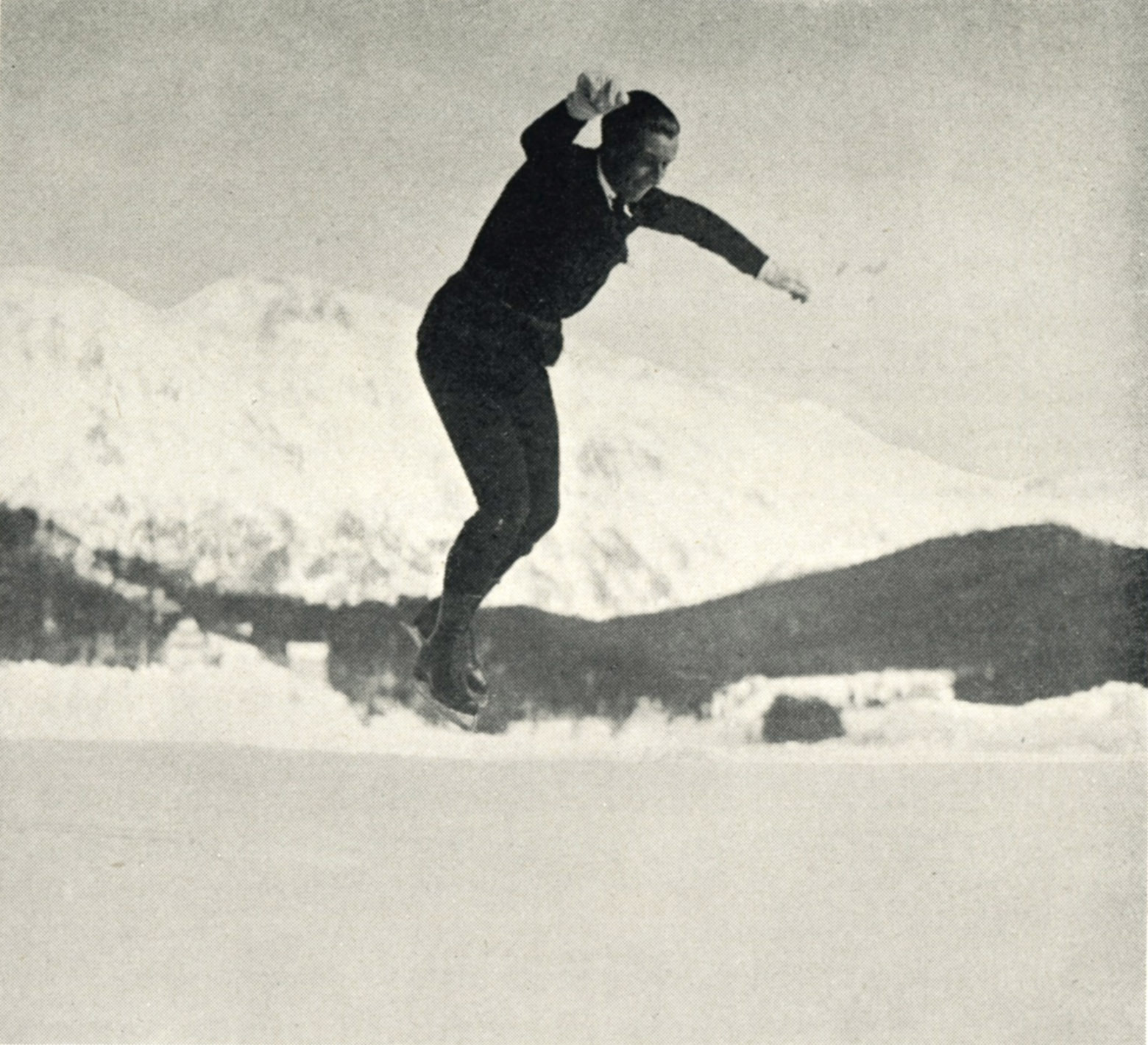

Personal information
- Full name: John Ferguson Page
- Other names: Jack Page
- Born: 27 March 1900 Brooklands, Sale
- Died: 14 February 1947 (aged 46) Manchester

Figure skating career
- Country: United Kingdom
- Partner: Ethel Muckelt
Medal record
Representing United Kingdom
Men's Figure skating
World Championships
Bronze medal – third place	1926 Berlin	Men's singles
Pairs Figure skating
World Championships
Silver medal – second place	1924 Manchester	Pairs

John Ferguson Page (27 March 1900 – 14 February 1947) was a British figure skater who competed both singles and pair skating. He was a World bronze medalist in singles, a World silver medalist in pairs, and 11-time British champion, a record only equaled by Jenna McCorkell (in women's singles). He also competed at the 1924 Winter Olympics and in the 1928 Winter Olympics in both single and pairs. He was born in Brooklands, Sale, Manchester, and died in Manchester.

At the 1924 Olympics, he finished fifth in the singles event. In the pairs competition, he and his partner Ethel Muckelt finished fourth. Four years later, he finished ninth in the singles event at the St. Moritz Games and with Muckelt, he finished seventh in the pairs competition.

== Results ==
=== Men's singles ===
Event	1922	1923	1924	1925	1926	1927	1928	1929	1930	1931	1932	1933
Winter Olympic Games			5th				9th					
World Championships			4th		3rd	5th	4th	4th				
European Championships			5th		4th							
British Championships	1st	1st	1st	1st	1st	1st	1st	1st	1st	1st		1st

=== Pairs with Muckelt ===
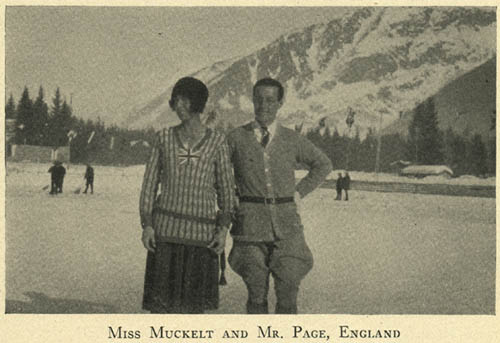
Page with Muckelt

Event	1924	1926	1928
Winter Olympic Games	4th		7th
World Championships	2nd	6th	4th
