= Georges Gautschi =

Swiss figure skater (1904–1985)

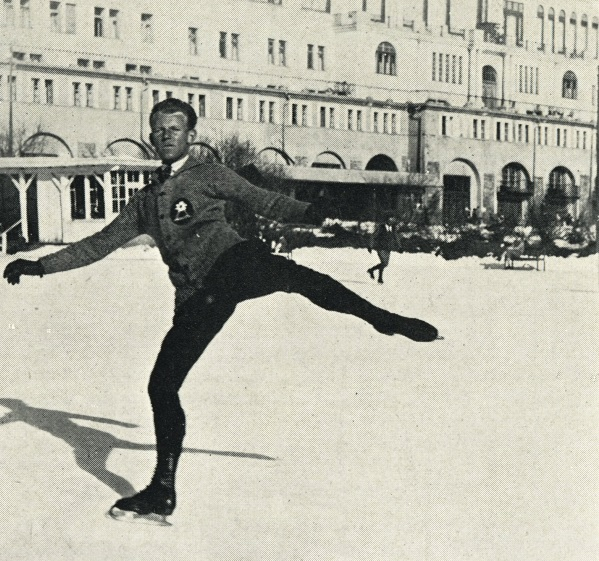

Personal information
- Full name: Georges Harold Roger Gautschi
- Born: 6 April 1904
- Died: 12 February 1985 (aged 80)

Figure skating career
- Country: Switzerland
Medal record
Men's figure skating
Representing Austria
Olympic Games
| Bronze medal – third place | 1924 Chamonix | Men's singles |
World Championships
| Bronze medal – third place | 1930 New York City | Men's singles |
European Championships
| Silver medal – second place | 1929 Davos | Men's singles |
| Bronze medal – third place | 1926 Davos | Men's singles |

Georges Harold Roger Gautschi (6 April 1904 – 12 February 1985) was a Swiss figure skater. He won the bronze medal in men's singles at age nineteen at the 1924 Chamonix Olympics. He went on to finish third at the 1926 European Figure Skating Championships and then second in 1929. Gautschi won the bronze medal at the 1930 World Figure Skating Championships.

== Results ==
| Event | 1919 | 1922 | 1923 | 1924 | 1925 | 1926 | 1927 | 1928 | 1929 | 1930 | 1931 |
|---|---|---|---|---|---|---|---|---|---|---|---|
| Winter Olympic Games | | | | 3rd | | | | | | | |
| World Championships | | | | | 6th | | 4th | | | 3rd | |
| European Championships | | 9th | | 7th | 4th | 3rd | | | 2nd | | |
| Swiss Championships | 2nd | | | | | 1st | 1st | | | | 1st |
