= Paul Franke (figure skater) =

German figure skater

- Born: 1888
- Died: 1950 (aged 61–62)

Figure skating career
- Country: German Empire

Paul Franke (1888–1950) was a German figure skater. He competed in the men's singles event at the 1928 Winter Olympics.
