= Ludwig Wrede =

Austrian figure skater

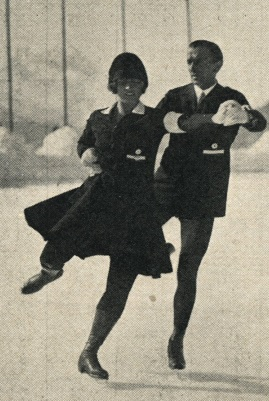
- Wrede with Brunner at the 1928 Winter Olympics

Personal information
- Born: 28 October 1894
- Died: 1 January 1965 (aged 70)

Figure skating career
- Country: Austria
- Retired: 1930
Medal record
Representing Austria
Men's Figure skating
World Championships
Bronze medal – third place	1929 London	Men's singles
European Championships
Bronze medal – third place	1929 Davos	Men's singles
Silver medal – second place	1924 Davos	Men's singles
Pairs Figure skating
Olympic Games
Bronze medal – third place	1928 St. Moritz	Pairs
World Championships
Silver medal – second place	1930 New York	Pairs
Silver medal – second place	1929 Budapest	Pairs
Bronze medal – third place	1928 London	Pairs
Gold medal – first place	1927 Vienna	Pairs
Bronze medal – third place	1926 Berlin	Pairs
Gold medal – first place	1925 Vienna	Pairs

Olympic medal record

Figure skating
Bronze medal – third place	1928 St. Moritz	Pairs

Ludwig Wrede (28 October 1894 – 1 January 1965) was an Austrian figure skater in both pairs and singles skating.

He competed with Herma Szabo and won the World Championships in 1925 and 1927. They won the bronze in 1926. After Szabo retired, Wrede competed with Melitta Brunner, with whom he won the bronze medal at the 1928 Winter Olympics. The pair won two silvers and a bronze at the World Championships from 1928 through 1930. As a singles skater, Wrede won the silver medal at the European Championships in 1924 and a bronze in 1929, besides a bronze in the World Championships in 1929.

== Results ==
=== Singles ===
International
Event	1914	1922	1923	1924	1925	1926	1927	1928	1929	1930
Winter Olympics								8th		
World Championships			5th	5th	7th	6th	6th	6th	3rd	5th
European Championships	5th			2nd	5th			4th	3rd	
National
Austrian Championships		3rd	1st	2nd					2nd	3rd

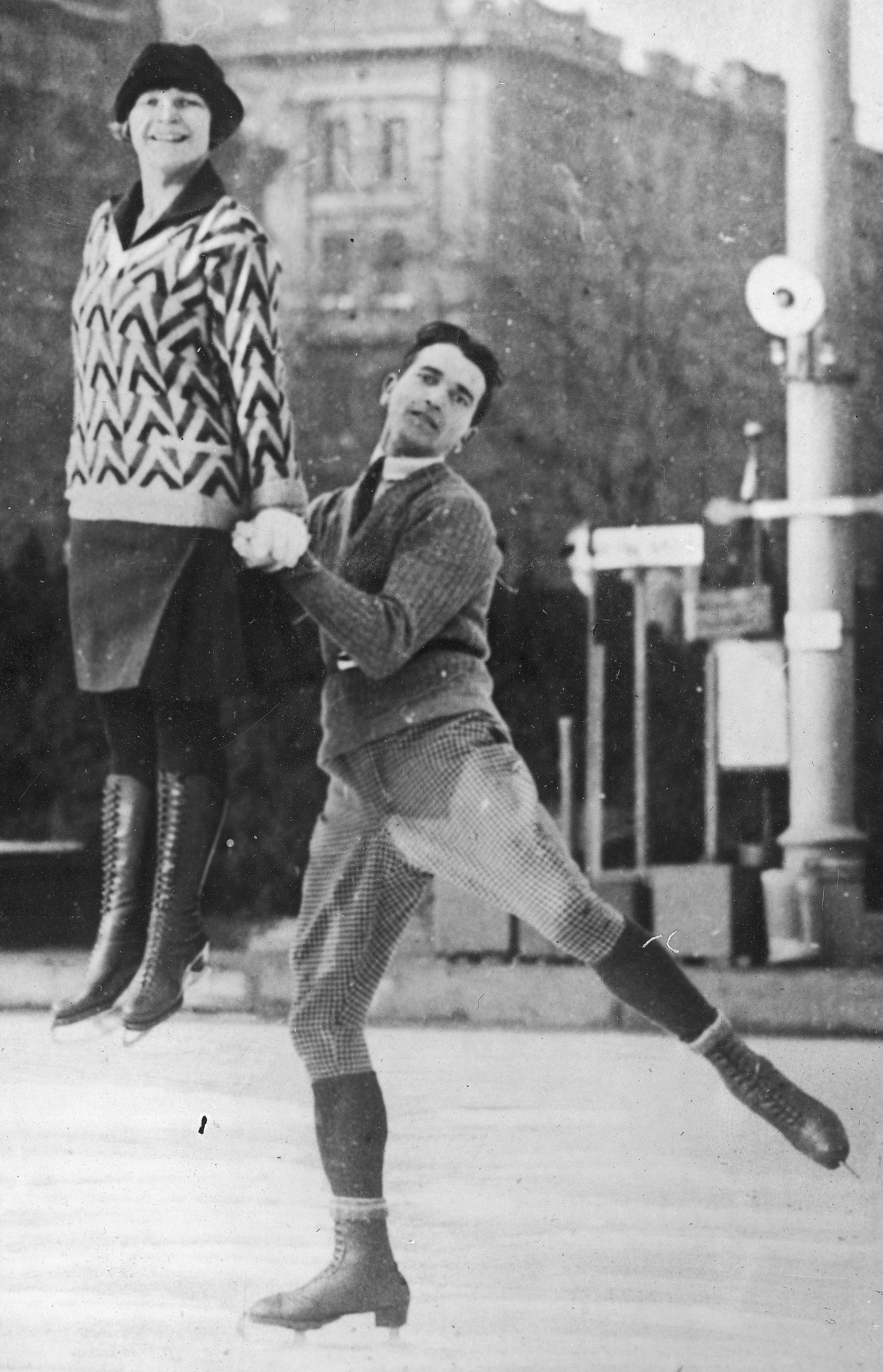
Wrede with Szabo in 1927

=== Pairs with Brunner ===
International
Event	1922	1923	1924	1928	1929	1930
Winter Olympics				3rd		
World Championships				3rd	2nd	2nd
National
Austrian Championships	3rd	1st	2nd		3rd	1st

=== Pairs with Szabo ===
International
Event	1925	1926	1927
World Championships	1st	3rd	1st
National
Austrian Championships	1st	1st	
