= Austrian Figure Skating Championships =

Annual figure skating competition in Austria

- Status: Active
- Genre: National championships
- Frequency: Annual
- Country: Austria
- Inaugurated: 1898
- Organizer: Skate Austria

The Austrian Figure Skating Championships (German: Österreichische Staatsmeisterschaften im Eiskunstlauf) are an annual figure skating competition organized by Skate Austria to crown the national champions of Austria. The first official Austrian Championships for men were held in 1898 in Vienna, for women in 1913 in Prague, and for pair skating in 1913 in Vienna. Competitions were periodically interrupted early on, especially during World War I and World War II. After the German annexation of Austria in 1938, Austrian citizens became de facto German citizens, but regional championships were still held in Austria that are historically considered Austria's national championships. Since World War II ended and Austria regained its independence, the Austrian Championships have been held without interruption.

Medals are awarded in men's singles, women's singles, pair skating, and ice dance at the senior and junior levels, although every discipline may not necessarily be held every year due to a lack of participants. Viktor Pfeifer holds the record for winning the most Austrian Championship titles in men's singles (with nine), while Regine Heitzer holds the record in women's singles (with seven). Miriam Ziegler and Severin Kiefer hold the record in pair skating (with eight), although Kiefer won an additional three championships with another partner. Dmitri Matsjuk holds the record in ice dance (with eight), although not all won with the same partner.

== History ==
The first skating club in Austria, the Vienna Skating Club, was established in 1867. At this time, Austria was part of the Austro-Hungarian Empire (Austria-Hungary). The first official national championships were held in 1898 in Vienna. The competition featured only four competitors; Josef Fellner was the winner. Until 1914, skaters from Austria-Hungary frequently competed at the German Figure Skating Championships. Georg Zachariades, who won the 1892 and 1893 German Championships, and Gustav Hügel, who won in 1894, were both from Vienna. The first national competition for women was held in 1913 in Prague, and was won by Gisela Reichmann, while the first national competition in pair skating took place the same year in Vienna, and was won by Helene Engelmann and Karl Mejstrik. Competition was frequently interrupted early on, especially from 1915 to 1920 due to World War I. After its defeat in World War I, Austria-Hungary was split into two states: the Republic of Austria and the Hungarian Republic.

The first national championships in ice dance were held in Vienna in 1937; Edith Winkelmann and Walter Löhner won the event. In March 1938, after the Anschluss – the annexation of Austria into the German Reich – Austria became part of the German Empire and the citizens of Austria became de facto German citizens. They were, therefore, eligible to compete in the German Figure Skating Championships. Edi Rada won the men's competition in 1943; Marta Musilek won the women's competitions in 1942, 1943, and 1944; Herta and Emil Ratzenhofer won the pairs competition in 1944; and Jutta Stöhr and Fritz Hackl won the ice dance competition in 1944. Austria – then called Ostmark – still held regional competitions, referred to as Gau-Championships (German: Gaumeisterschaften). Those results are considered Austria's historical results. No championships were held in 1944 or 1945 due to World War II. After the war ended and Austria regained its independence, national championships resumed, and have been held without interruption since.

== Senior medalists ==
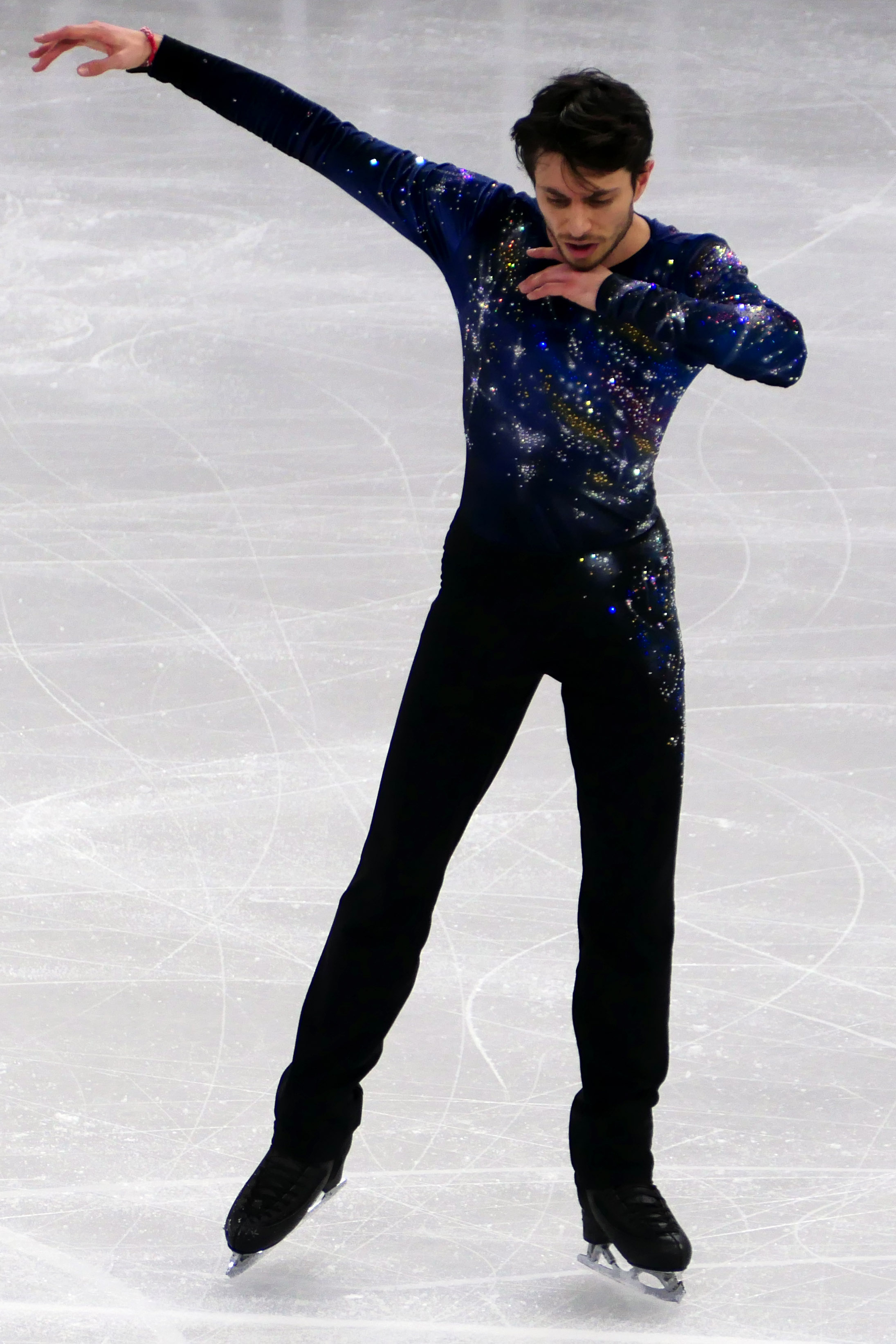
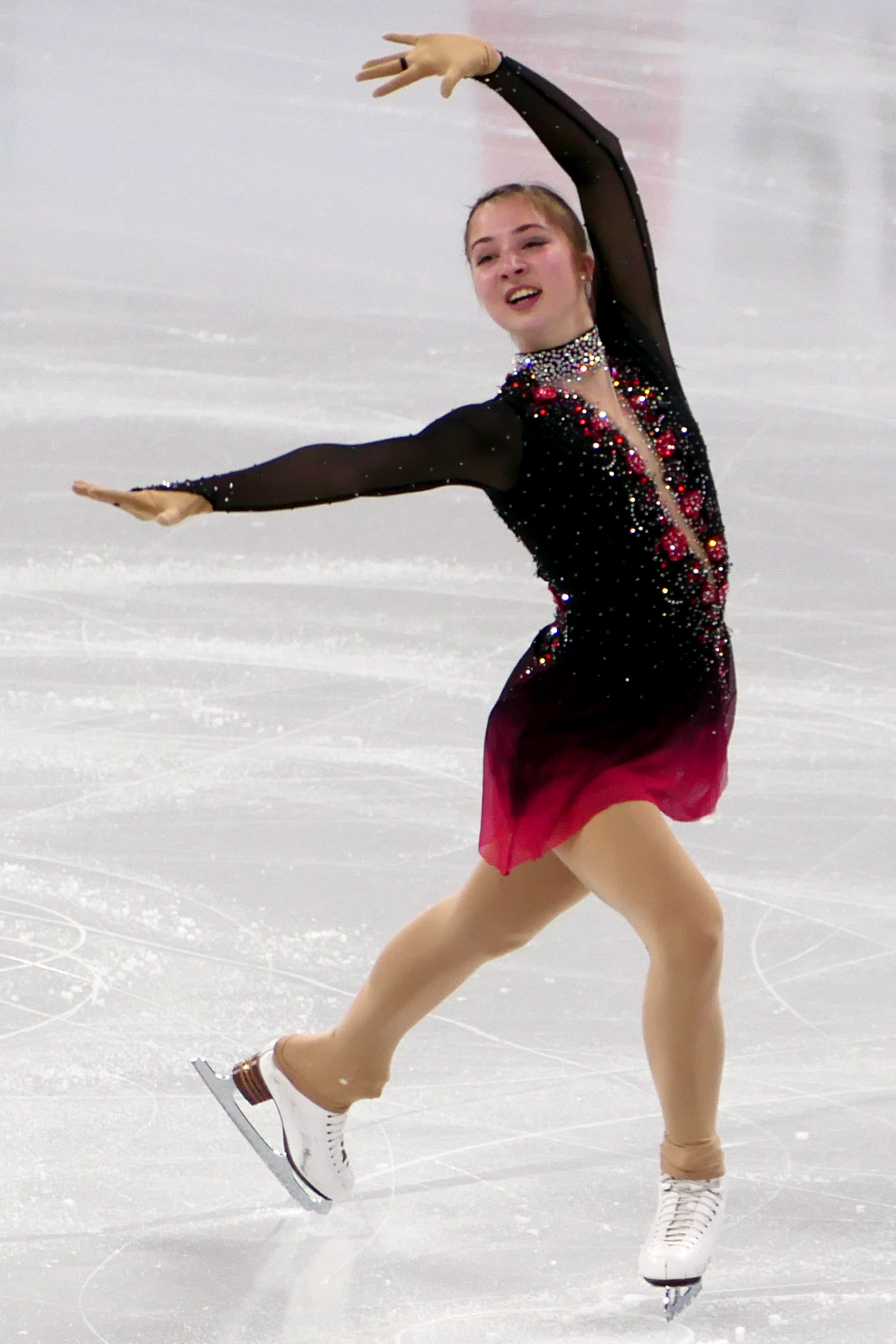
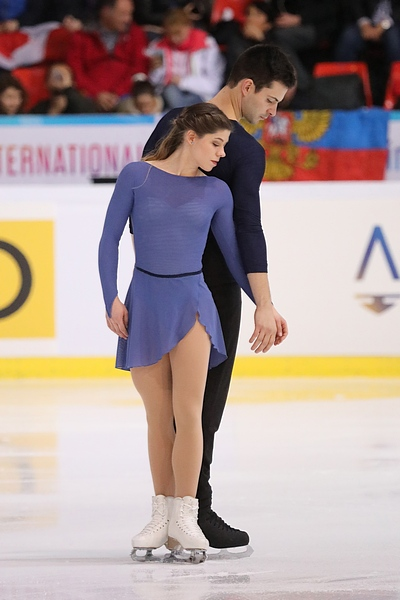
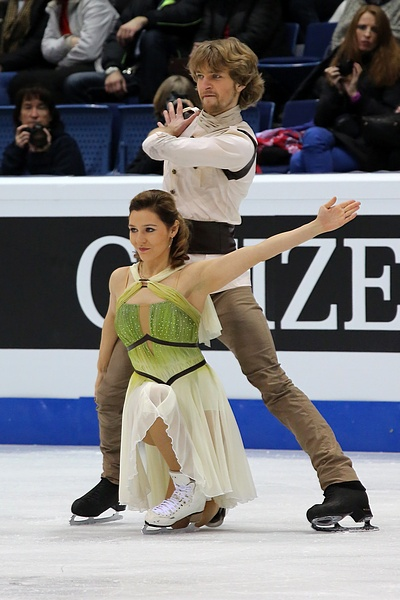
From left to right: Maurizio Zandron, seven-time Austrian champion in men's singles; Olga Mikutina, five-time Austrian champion in women's singles; Miriam Ziegler and Severin Kiefer, eight-time Austrian champions in pair skating; and Barbora Silná and Juri Kurakin, three-time Austrian champions in ice dance

=== Men's singles ===
Senior men's event medalists
Year	Location	Gold	Silver	Bronze	Ref.
1898	Vienna	Josef Fellner	Ernst Fellner	Alfred Klement	
1899–1900	No competitions held				
1901	Lemberg	Max Bohatsch	Anton Steiner	No other competitors	
1902–03	No competitions held				
1904	Vienna	Max Bohatsch	Anton Steiner	No other competitors	
1905	Innsbruck	Max Bohatsch	No other competitors		
1906	No competition held				
1907	Klagenfurt	Ernst Herz	Anton Steiner	No other competitors	
1908	Vienna	Anton Steiner	No other competitors		
1909	Vienna	Anton Steiner	Fritz Kachler	Ludwig Richard	
1910	Vienna	Fritz Kachler	Karl Mejstrik	Erwin Schwarzböck	
1911	Klagenfurt	Fritz Kachler	Karl Mejstrik	Josef Oppacher	
1912	Lemberg	Fritz Kachler	Ernst Oppacher	Ludwig Richard	
1913	Vienna	Willy Böckl	Ernst Oppacher	No other competitors	
1914	Vienna	Willy Böckl	Ernst Oppacher	Erwin Schwarzböck	
1915–20	No competitions due to World War I				
1921	Vienna	Ernst Oppacher	Willy Böckl	Ludwig Wrede	
1922	Vienna	Ernst Oppacher	Erwin Schwarzböck	Ludwig Wrede	
1923	Vienna	Ludwig Wrede	Ernst Oppacher	Otto Preißecker	
1924	Innsbruck	Willy Böckl	Ludwig Wrede	Hugo Distler	
1925	Graz	Fritz Kachler	Willy Böckl	Otto Preißecker	
1926	Vienna	Otto Preißecker	Herr Mattauch	No other competitors	
1927	Klagenfurt	Otto Preißecker	Karl Schäfer	Ernst Oppacher	
1928	Innsbruck	Otto Preißecker	Karl Schäfer	Hugo Distler	
1929	Stockerau	Karl Schäfer	Ludwig Wrede	Rudolf Zettelmann	
1930	Vienna	Karl Schäfer	Hugo Distler	Ludwig Wrede	
1931	Innsbruck	Karl Schäfer	Hugo Distler	Josef Bernhauser	
1932	Vienna	Karl Schäfer	Otto Hartmann	Erich Erdös	
1933	St. Pölten	Karl Schäfer	Erich Erdös	Otto Hartmann	
1934	Vienna	Karl Schäfer	Erich Erdös	Leopold Linhart	
1935	Vienna	Felix Kaspar	Erich Erdös	Leopold Linhart	
1936	Vienna	Karl Schäfer	Leopold Linhart	Hellmut May	
1937	Mödling	Felix Kaspar	Leopold Linhart	Hellmut May	
1938	Vienna	Felix Kaspar	Edi Rada	Emil Ratzenhofer	
1939	Vienna	Edi Rada	Herbert Alward	Emil Ratzenhofer	
1940	Vienna	Edi Rada	Hellmut May	Karl Jungbauer	
1941	Vienna	Edi Rada	Hellmut May	Karl Jungbauer	
1942	St. Pölten	Edi Rada	Franz Zelger	No other competitors	
1943	Mödling	Hanno Brückmann	Georg Felsenreich	Karl Kurz	
1944–45	No competitions due to World War II				
1946	Vienna	Edi Rada	Hellmut May	Georg Felsenreich	
1947	Klagenfurt	Edi Rada	Helmut Seibt	Alexander Palisch	
1948	Vienna	Edi Rada	Hellmut May	Hellmut Seibt	
1949	Graz	Edi Rada	Hellmut Seibt	No other competitors	
1950	Graz	Hellmut Seibt	Martin Felsenreich	Norbert Cerny	
1951	Vienna	Hellmut Seibt	Martin Felsenreich	Kurt Oppelt	
1952	Seefeld	Hellmut Seibt	Martin Felsenreich	Kurt Oppelt	
1953	St. Anton am Arlberg	Martin Felsenreich	Kurt Oppelt	Norbert Felsinger	
1954	Graz	Norbert Felsinger	Hanno Ströher	Heinz Döpfl	
1955	Vienna	Norbert Felsinger	Karl Böhringer	Heinz Döpfl	
1956	Vienna	Norbert Felsinger	Karl Böhringer	Peter Jonas	
1957	Vienna	Norbert Felsinger	Peter Jonas	Hanno Ströher	
1958	Spittal an der Drau	Norbert Felsinger	Peter Jonas	Karl Böhringer	
1959	Vienna	Norbert Felsinger	Peter Jonas	Karl Böhringer	
1960	Vienna	Norbert Felsinger	Peter Jonas	Heinrich Podhajsky	
1961	Vienna	Peter Jonas	Emmerich Danzer	Heinrich Podhajsky	
1962	Vienna	Peter Jonas	Emmerich Danzer	Heinrich Podhajsky	
1963	Vienna	Peter Jonas	Emmerich Danzer	Heinrich Podhajsky	
1964	Innsbruck	Peter Jonas	Emmerich Danzer	Wolfgang Schwarz	
1965	Klagenfurt	Emmerich Danzer	Peter Jonas	Wolfgang Schwarz	
1966	Salzburg	Emmerich Danzer	Wolfgang Schwarz	Günter Anderl	
1967	Vienna	Emmerich Danzer	Wolfgang Schwarz	Günter Anderl	
1968	Feldkirch	Emmerich Danzer	Wolfgang Schwarz	Günter Anderl	
1969	Graz	Günter Anderl	Josef Schneider	Herr Lanz	
1970	Innsbruck	Günter Anderl	Josef Schneider	Günther Hilgarth	
1971	Klagenfurt	Günter Anderl	Josef Schneider	Günther Hilgarth	
1972	Graz	Josef Schneider	Günter Anderl	Günther Hilgarth	
1973	Innsbruck	Günther Hilgarth	Josef Schneider	Ronald Koppelent	
1974	Vienna	Ronald Koppelent	Günther Hilgarth	Helmut Kristofics-Binder	
1975	Klagenfurt	Ronald Koppelent	Günther Hilgarth	Gerhard Hubmann	
1976	Innsbruck	Ronald Koppelent	Gerhard Hubmann	Günther Hilgarth	
1977	Lustenau	Ronald Koppelent	Gerhard Hubmann	Helmut Kristofics-Binder	
1978	Zeltweg	Gerhard Hubmann	Helmut Kristofics-Binder	Bruno Watschinger	
1979	Klagenfurt	Helmut Kristofics-Binder	Bruno Watschinger	Gerald Schranz	
1980	Vienna	Helmut Kristofics-Binder	Bruno Watschinger	Thomas Hlavik	
1981	Innsbruck	Bruno Watschinger	Andreas Narzt	Thomas Hlavik	
1982	Graz	Thomas Hlavik	Rudolf Kleinert	Christoph Köstenberger	
1983	Klagenfurt	Thomas Hlavik	Ralph Burghart	Alexander Fiebinger	
1984	Vienna	Thomas Hlavik	Ralph Burghart	Robert Dörfler	
1985	Graz	Ralph Burghart	Robert Dörfler	Christian Hubinger	
1986	Linz	Thomas Hlavik	Ralph Burghart	Alexander Fiebinger	
1987	Klagenfurt	Ralph Burghart	Alexander Fiebinger	Herr Sykora	
1988	Innsbruck	Ralph Burghart	Armin Withalm	Daniel Kappacher	
1989	Linz	Ralph Burghart	Armin Withalm	Daniel Kappacher	
1990	Klagenfurt	Ralph Burghart	Daniel Kappacher	Nikolaus Adler	
1991	Innsbruck	Ralph Burghart	Daniel Kappacher	Nikolaus Adler	
1992	Lustenau	Ralph Burghart	Nikolaus Adler	Roland Burghart	
1993	Vienna	Florian Tuma	Roland Burghart	Markus Lehner	
1994	Klagenfurt	Florian Tuma	Markus Haider	Georg Ganner	
1995	Vienna	Florian Tuma	Markus Haider	Roland Burghart	
1996	Vienna	Florian Tuma	Roland Burghart	Markus Haider	
1997	St. Pölten	Florian Tuma	Clemens Jonas	Roland Burghart	
1998	Vienna	Christian Horvath	Clemens Jonas	Michael Weber	
1999	Graz	Clemens Jonas	Philipp Morscher	Florian Mistelbauer	
2000	Vienna	Christian Horvath	Clemens Jonas	Philipp Morscher	
2001	Salzburg	Clemens Jonas	Christian Horvath	Christian Rauchbauer	
2002	Vienna	Clemens Jonas	Christian Rauchbauer	Florian Mistelbauer	
2003	Dornbirn	Viktor Pfeifer	Christian Rauchbauer	Florian Mistelbauer	
2004	Vienna	Clemens Jonas	Viktor Pfeifer	Christian Rauchbauer	
2005	Innsbruck	Viktor Pfeifer	Christian Rauchbauer	Manuel Koll	
2006	Innsbruck	Viktor Pfeifer	No other competitors		
2007	Vienna	Manuel Koll	Viktor Pfeifer	Christian Rauchbauer	
2008	St. Pölten	Manuel Koll	Christian Rauchbauer	Mario-Rafael Ionian	
2009	Linz	Viktor Pfeifer	Mario-Rafael Ionian	Severin Kiefer	
2010	Innsbruck	Viktor Pfeifer	Manuel Koll	Mario-Rafael Ionian	
2011	St. Pölten	Viktor Pfeifer	Manuel Koll	Mario-Rafael Ionian	
2012	Graz	Viktor Pfeifer	Manuel Koll	Severin Kiefer	
2013	Vienna	Viktor Pfeifer	Mario-Rafael Ionian	Severin Kiefer	
2014	Salzburg	Viktor Pfeifer	Mario-Rafael Ionian	Severin Kiefer	
2015	Dornbirn	Mario-Rafael Ionian	Manuel Koll	Albert Mück	
2016	Innsbruck	Mario-Rafael Ionian	Manuel Koll	Albert Mück	
2017	Graz	Mario-Rafael Ionian	Manuel Koll	Johannes Maierhofer	
2018	Vienna	Manuel Koll	Albert Mück	Manuel Drechsler	
2019	Gmunden	Maurizio Zandron	Luc Maierhofer	Albert Mück	
2020	Klagenfurt	Maurizio Zandron	Albert Mück	Manuel Drechsler	
2021	Linz	Maurizio Zandron	Luc Maierhofer	Albert Mück	
2022	Graz	Luc Maierhofer	Maurizio Zandron	Valentin Eisenbauer	
2023	St. Pölten	Maurizio Zandron	Luc Maierhofer	Anton Skoficz	
2024	Feldkirch	Maurizio Zandron	Luc Maierhofer	Anton Skoficz	
2025	Dornbirn	Maurizio Zandron	Valentin Eisenbauer	Anton Skoficz	
2026	Innsbruck	Maurizio Zandron	Tobia Öllerer	Anton Skoficz	

=== Women's singles ===
Senior women's event medalists
Year	Location	Gold	Silver	Bronze	Ref.
1913	Prague (Note: Prague, in present-day Czech Republic, was at this point in time part of Austria-Hungary.)	Gisela Reichmann	Paula Zalaudek	Paula Hanka	
1914	Linz	Gisela Reichmann	Paula Zalaudek	Paula Hanka	
1915	No competition due to World War I				
1916	Vienna	Paula Zalaudek	Gisela Reichmann	"Herold" (Note: The identity of the third competitor in the 1916 women's event is unknown, as she competed using a pseudonym ("Herold").)	
1917	Vienna	Gisela Reichmann	Paula Zalaudek	No other competitors	
1918	Vienna	Gisela Reichmann	Herma von Szabo	No other competitors	
1919–20	No competitions due to World War I				
1921	Vienna	No women's competition held			
1922	Vienna	Herma Plank-Szabo	Gisela Reichmann	No other competitors	
1923	Vienna	Herma Plank-Szabo	Gisela Reichmann	Hildegard Thiel	
1924	Vienna	Herma Plank-Szabo	Hildegard Thiel	No other competitors	
1925	Klagenfurt	Herma Plank-Szabo	No other competitors		
1926	Graz	Herma Plank-Szabo	Melitta Brunner	No other competitors	
1927	Innsbruck	Herma Plank-Szabo	Melitta Brunner	Fritzi Burger	
1928	Vienna	Fritzi Burger	Melitta Brunner	Grete Kubitschek	
1929	Semmering	Fritzi Burger	Melitta Brunner	Grete Kubitschek	
1930	Innsbruck	Fritzi Burger	Melitta Brunner	Ilse Hornung	
1931	Mödling	Fritzi Burger	Ilse Hornung	Lili Weiler	
1932	Vienna	Hilde Holovsky	Fritzi Burger	Helga Dietz	
1933	Graz	Hilde Holovsky	Liselotte Landbeck	Helga Dietz	
1934	Vienna	Liselotte Landbeck	Grete Lainer	Fritzi Burger	
1935	Vienna	Liselotte Landbeck	Grete Lainer	Hedy Stenuf	
1936	Vienna	Emmy Putzinger	Hedy Stenuf	Grete Lainer	
1937	Vienna	Emmy Putzinger	Grete Lainer	Hanne Niernberger	
1938	Seefeld	Emmy Putzinger	Hanne Niernberger	Lissy König	
1939	Vienna	Emmy Putzinger	Emmy Pollak	Anita Waegeler	
1940	Vienna	Hanne Niernberger	Emmy Putzinger	Hertha Wächtler	
1941	Vienna	Hanne Niernberger	Marta Musilek	Madeleine Müller	
1942	Klagenfurt	Martha Musilek	Grete Veit	Inge Solar	
1943	Mödling	Martha Musilek	Madeleine Müller	Hilde Appeltauer	
1944-45	No competitions due to World War II				
1946	Vienna	Eva Pawlik	Inge Solar	Hilde Appeltauer	
1947	Graz	Eva Pawlik	Inge Solar	Lilly Fuchs	
1948	Vienna	Eva Pawlik	Hilde Appeltauer	Inge Solar	
1949	Graz	Eva Pawlik	Lilly Fuchs	Susi Giebisch	
1950	Innsbruck	Lilly Fuchs	Susi Giebisch	Lotte Schwenk	
1951	Vienna	Lotte Schwenk	Annelies Schilhan	Eva Weidler	
1952	Seefeld	Annelies Schilhan	Sissy Schwarz	Eva Weidler	
1953	St. Anton am Arlberg	Annelies Schilhan	Ingrid Wendl	Hanna Walter	
1954	Graz	Annelies Schilhan	Hanna Eigel	Ingrid Wendl	
1955	Vienna	Ingrid Wendl	Hanna Eigel	Hanna Walter	
1956	Vienna	Ingrid Wendl	Hanna Walter	Ilse Musil	
1957	Vienna	Hanna Eigel	Ingrid Wendl	Hanna Walter	
1958	Spittal an der Drau	Ingrid Wendl	Hanna Walter	Regine Heitzer	
1959	Vienna	Hanna Walter	Regine Heitzer	Roswitha Sodoma	
1960	Vienna	Regine Heitzer	Karin Frohner	Hella Henneis	
1961	Vienna	Regine Heitzer	Karin Frohner	Helli Sengstschmid	
1962	Vienna	Regine Heitzer	Karin Frohner	Helli Sengstschmid	
1963	Vienna	Regine Heitzer	Ingrid Ostler	Astrid Czermak	
1964	Innsbruck	Regine Heitzer	Helli Sengstschmid	Ingrid Ostler	
1965	Klagenfurt	Regine Heitzer	Helli Sengstschmid	Astrid Czermak	
1966	Salzburg	Regine Heitzer	Elisabeth Mikula	Elisabeth Nestler	
1967	Vienna	Beatrix Schuba	Elisabeth Mikula	Elisabeth Nestler	
1968	Feldkirch	Beatrix Schuba	Elisabeth Nestler	Helli Sengstschmid-Tunner	
1969	Graz	Beatrix Schuba	Elisabeth Nestler	Elisabeth Mikula	
1970	Innsbruck	Beatrix Schuba	Elisabeth Nestler	Wilfriede Reiter	
1971	Klagenfurt	Beatrix Schuba	Sonja Balun	Iris Ebenwaldner	
1972	Graz	Beatrix Schuba	Sonja Balun	Iris Ebenwaldner	
1973	Innsbruck	Sonja Balun	Susanne Altura	Brigitte Falk	
1974	Vienna	Sonja Balun	Susanne Altura	Brigitte Falk	
1975	Klagenfurt	Sonja Balun	Sonja Stanek	Christi Jorda	
1976	Innsbruck	Sonja Balun	Claudia Kristofics-Binder	Christi Jorda	
1977	Lustenau	Claudia Kristofics-Binder	Sonja Stanek	Christi Jorda	
1978	Zeltweg	Claudia Kristofics-Binder	Sonja Stanek	Petra Schruf	
1979	Klagenfurt	Claudia Kristofics-Binder	Sonja Stanek	Andrea Rohm	
1980	Vienna	Claudia Kristofics-Binder	Sonja Stanek	Petra Schruf	
1981	Innsbruck	Claudia Kristofics-Binder	Andrea Rohm	Sonja Stanek	
1982	Graz	Claudia Kristofics-Binder	Sonja Stanek	Parthena Sarafidis	
1983	Klagenfurt	Sonja Stanek	Parthena Sarafidis	Petra Schruf	
1984	Vienna	Parthena Sarafidis	Susanne Gschwendt	Sonja Stanek	
1985	Graz	Sabine Paal	Susanne Gschwendt	Parthena Sarafidis	
1986	Linz	Parthena Sarafidis	Sabine Paal	Christine Dekitsch	
1987	Klagenfurt	Sabine Paal	Yvonne Pokorny	Frau Lischka	
1988	Innsbruck	Yvonne Pokorny	Sabine Lischka	Susanne Reindl	
1989	Linz	Yvonne Pokorny	Susanne Reindl	Geraldine Fucik	
1990	Klagenfurt	Yvonne Pokorny	Christine Czerny	Susanne Reindl	
1991	Innsbruck	Yvonne Pokorny	Christine Czerny	Melanie Friedreich	
1992	Lustenau	Yvonne Pokorny	Christine Czerny	Andrea Kus	
1993	Vienna	Andrea Kus	Yvonne Pokorny	Eva Sonnleitner	
1994	Klagenfurt	Julia Lautowa	Martina Kus	Eva Sonnleitner	
1995	Vienna	Julia Lautowa	Angela Tuska	Helena Pajović	
1996	Vienna	Andrea Kus	Denise Jaschek	Karin Brandstätter	
1997	St. Pölten	Julia Lautowa	Anna Wenzel	Karin Brandstätter	
1998	Vienna	Jubilee Jenna Mandl	Anna Wenzel	Elisabeth Angerer	
1999	Graz	Jubilee Jenna Mandl	Anna Wenzel	Elisabeth Angerer	
2000	Vienna	Julia Lautowa	Anna Wenzel	Karin Strebl	
2001	Salzburg	Anna Wenzel	Karin Steiner	Anna Gabriel	
2002	Vienna	Julia Lautowa	Diána Póth	Jennifer LeGuilloux	
2003	Dornbirn	Julia Lautowa	Jennifer LeGuilloux	Anni Luftensteiner	
2004	Vienna	Julia Lautowa	Andrea Kreuzer	Anni Luftensteiner	
2005	Innsbruck	Karin Brandstätter	Anni Luftensteiner	Andrea Kreuzer	
2006	Innsbruck	Andrea Kreuzer	Kathrin Freudelsperger	Astrid Mangi	
2007	Vienna	Kathrin Freudelsperger	Denise Kögl	Kerstin Frank	
2008	St. Pölten	Denise Kögl	Stefanie Ellensohn	Kerstin Frank	
2009	Linz	Miriam Ziegler	Kerstin Frank	Denise Kögl	
2010	Innsbruck	Miriam Ziegler	Kerstin Frank	Belinda Schönberger	
2011	St. Pölten	Belinda Schönberger	Andrea Kreuzer	Kerstin Frank	
2012	Graz	Kerstin Frank	Belinda Schönberger	Miriam Ziegler	
2013	Vienna	Kerstin Frank	Belinda Schönberger	Natascha Zangl	
2014	Salzburg	Kerstin Frank	Christina Grill	Jenny Lin	
2015	Dornbirn	Kerstin Frank	Anita Kapferer	Sabrina Schulz	
2016	Innsbruck	Kerstin Frank	Belinda Schönberger	Lara Roth	
2017	Graz	Kerstin Frank	Alisa Stomakhina	Marika Steward	
2018	Vienna	Lara Roth	Natalie Klotz	Sophia Schaller	
2019	Gmunden	Lara Roth	Sophia Schaller	Victoria Hübler	
2020	Klagenfurt	Olga Mikutina	Sophia Schaller	Stefanie Pesendorfer	
2021	Linz	Olga Mikutina	Sophia Schaller	Anita Kapferer	
2022	Graz	Stefanie Pesendorfer	Olga Mikutina	Sophia Schaller	
2023	St. Pölten	Emily Saari	Sophia Schaller	Stefanie Pesendorfer	
2024	Feldkirch	Olga Mikutina	Stefanie Pesendorfer	Emily Saari	
2025	Dornbirn	Olga Mikutina	Flora Marie Schaller	Emily Saari	
2026	Innsbruck	Olga Mikutina	Jasmin Elsebaie	Flora Marie Schaller	

=== Pairs ===
Senior pairs event medalists
Year	Location	Gold	Silver	Bronze	Ref.
1913	Vienna	Helene Engelmann; Karl Mejstrik	Christa von Szabó; Leo Horwitz	Hilda Schwamberg; Fritz Reiner	
1914	Vienna	Christa von Szabó; Leo Horwitz	Helene Engelmann; Karl Mejstrik	No other competitors	
1915–20	No competitions due to World War I				
1921	Vienna	Helene Engelmann; Alfred Berger	Hansi Eissert; Georg Pamperl	No other competitors	
1922	Vienna	Helene Engelmann; Alfred Berger	Hansi Eissert; Georg Pamperl	No other competitors	
1923	Vienna	Helene Engelmann; Alfred Berger	Fräulein Rosmus; Otto Preißecker	Frau H. May; Oskar May	
1924	Vienna	Lilly Scholz; Otto Kaiser	Gisela Hochhaltinger; Georg Pamperl	Frau H. May; Oskar May	
1925	Innsbruck	Herma Szabo; Ludwig Wrede	Fräulein Steinsky; Dr. Prohaska	No other competitors	
1926	Graz	Herma Szabo; Ludwig Wrede	No other competitors		
1927	Graz	Lilly Scholz; Otto Kaiser	No other competitors		
1928	Bruck an der Mur	Lilly Scholz; Otto Kaiser	Melitta Brunner; Ludwig Wrede	Fräulein Bahdar; Otto Hartmann	
1929	Klagenfurt	Lilly Scholz; Otto Kaiser	Gisela Hochhaltinger; Otto Preißecker	Melitta Brunner; Ludwig Wrede	
1930	Semmering	Melitta Brunner; Ludwig Wrede	Gisela Hochhaltinger; Otto Preißecker	Ridi Jauernigg; Pepo Jauernigg	
1931	Graz	Lilly Gaillard; Willy Petter	Idi Papez; Karl Zwack	Ridi Jauernigg; Pepo Jauernigg	
1932	Klagenfurt	Lilly Gaillard; Willy Petter	Idi Papez; Karl Zwack	Olly Holzmann; Ludwig Wrede	
1933	Innsbruck	Idi Papez; Karl Zwack	Lilly Gaillard; Willy Petter	Hansi Kast; Otto Kaiser	
1934	Vienna	Idi Papez; Karl Zwack	Herta Baumgartner; Rolf Stillebacher	Edeltraut Kafka; Kurt Hanke	
1935	Vienna	Idi Papez; Karl Zwack	Ilse Pausin; Erik Pausin	Liese Kianek; Adolf Rosdol	
1936	Vienna	Ilse Pausin; Erik Pausin	Edeltraut Kafka; Kurt Hanke	Frieda Hawel; Kurt Heidinger	
1937	Seefeld	Ilse Pausin; Erik Pausin	Hildegard Eigel; Karl Eigel	Helga Schrittwieser; Pepo Jauernigg	
1938	Graz	Ilse Pausin; Erik Pausin	Hildegard Eigel; Karl Eigel	Helga Schrittwieser; Pepo Jauernigg	
1939	Vienna	Ilse Pausin; Erik Pausin	Hildegard Eigel; Karl Eigel	Helga Schrittwieser; Pepo Jauernigg	
1940	Vienna	Ilse Pausin; Erik Pausin	Hildegard Eigel; Karl Eigel	Herta Ratzenhofer; Emil Ratzenhofer	
1941	Vienna	Ilse Pausin; Erik Pausin	Herta Ratzenhofer; Emil Ratzenhofer	Herta Jurczak; Gottfried Hauser	
1942	St. Pölten	Eva Pawlik; Rudi Seeliger	Hilda Zimmermann; Karl Gmeiner	No other competitors	
1943	Mödling	Herta Ratzenhofer; Emil Ratzenhofer	Anneliese Wambera; Walter Hüttner	No other competitors	
1944–45	No competitions due to World War II				
1946	Vienna	Herta Ratzenhofer; Emil Ratzenhofer	Susi Giebisch; Helmut Seibt	Annaliese Wambera; Walter Hüttner	
1947	Graz	Herta Ratzenhofer; Emil Ratzenhofer	Susi Giebisch; Helmut Seibt	Inge Müller; Walter Hüttner	
1948	Vienna	Herta Ratzenhofer; Emil Ratzenhofer	Susi Giebisch; Helmut Seibt	Elli Stärck; Harry Gareis	
1949	Graz	Herta Ratzenhofer; Emil Ratzenhofer	Elli Stärck; Harry Gareis	No other competitors	
1950	Graz	Susi Giebisch; Rudi Seeliger	Elli Stärck; Harry Gareis	Herta Ratzenhofer; Emil Ratzenhofer	
1951	Mariazell	Elli Stärck; Harry Gareis	Edith Sporn; Werner Dreßl	No other competitors	
1952	Seefeld	Sissy Schwarz; Kurt Oppelt	Edith Sporn; Werner Dreßl	No other competitors	
1953	St. Anton am Arlberg	Sissy Schwarz; Kurt Oppelt	Ingrid Wiedstruck; Konrad Lienert	Inge Löscher; Friedrich Klein	
1954	Graz	Sissy Schwarz; Kurt Oppelt	Ingrid Wiedstruck; Konrad Lienert	Luise Lehner; Georg Lenitz	
1955	Vienna	Sissy Schwarz; Kurt Oppelt	Liesl Ellend; Konrad Lienert	No other competitors	
1956	Vienna	Sissy Schwarz; Kurt Oppelt	Liesl Ellend; Konrad Lienert	No other competitors	
1957	Vienna	Liesl Ellend; Konrad Lienert	Diana Hinko; Heinz Döpfl	Roswitha Mauerhofer; Gunther Mauerhofer	
1958	Spittal an der Drau	Liesl Ellend; Konrad Lienert	Diana Hinko; Heinz Döpfl	Roswitha Mauerhofer; Gunther Mauerhofer	
1959	Vienna	Diana Hinko; Heinz Döpfl	Roswitha Mauerhofer; Gunther Mauerhofer	No other competitors	
1960	Vienna	Diana Hinko; Heinz Döpfl	Edith Jürs; Norbert Felsinger	No other competitors	
1961	Vienna	Diana Hinko; Heinz Döpfl	No other competitors		
1962	Vienna	Diana Hinko; Bernd Henhapel	Gerlinde Schonbauer; Wilhelm Bietak	Inge Strell; Ferry Dedovich	
1963	Vienna	Gerlinde Schönbauer; Wilhelm Bietak	Inge Strell; Ferry Dedovich	No other competitors	
1964	Innsbruck	Gerlinde Schönbauer; Wilhelm Bietak	Inge Strell; Ferry Dedovich	No other competitors	
1965	Klagenfurt	Gerlinde Schönbauer; Wilhelm Bietak	Inge Strell; Ferry Dedovich	No other competitors	
1966	Salzburg	Gerlinde Schönbauer; Wilhelm Bietak	Evelyne Scharf; Ferry Dedovich	No other competitors	
1967	Vienna	Evelyne Schneider; Willy Bietak	Helga Stielke; Eduard Lanz	No other competitors	
1968	Feldkirch	Evelyne Schneider; Willy Bietak	Helga Stielke; Robert Zangger	No other competitors	
1969	Graz	Evelyne Schneider; Willy Bietak	Ursula Nemec; Michael Nemec	No other competitors	
1970	Innsbruck	Evelyne Schneider; Willy Bietak	Ursula Nemec; Michael Nemec	No other competitors	
1971	Klagenfurt	Evelyne Schneider; Willy Bietak	Ursula Nemec; Michael Nemec	No other competitors	
1972	Graz	Ursula Nemec; Michael Nemec	Frau Golub; Herr Weninger	No other competitors	
1973	Innsbruck	Ursula Nemec; Michael Nemec	Frau Golub; Herr Weninger	No other competitors	
1974	Vienna	Ursula Nemec; Michael Nemec	Gabriele Arco; Nikolaus Stephan	Ulrike Vrbik; Richard Scharf	
1975	Klagenfurt	Ursula Nemec; Michael Nemec	Gabriele Arco; Nikolaus Stephan	Ulrike Vrbik; Richard Scharf	
1976	Vienna	Ursula Nemec; Michael Nemec	Gabriele Arco; Nikolaus Stephan	No other competitors	
1977	Lustenau	Jenny Booth; Michael Nemec	No other competitors		
1978–79	No pairs competitors				
1980	Vienna	Ingrid Fuchs; Walter Fuchs	No other competitors		
1981–91	No pairs competitors				
1992	Lustenau	Ulrike Gerstl; Björn Lobenwein	No other competitors		
1993	Vienna	Ulrike Gerstl; Björn Lobenwein	No other competitors		
1994	Klagenfurt	Ulrike Gerstl; Björn Lobenwein	No other competitors		
1995	Vienna	Ulrike Gerstl; Björn Lobenwein	No other competitors		
1996	Vienna	Ulrike Gerstl; Björn Lobenwein	No other competitors		
1997	St. Pölten	No pairs competitors			
1998	Vienna	Marion Haas; Björn Lobenwein	Katarzyna Prystal; Roland Burghart	No other competitors	
1999	Graz	Claudia Koll; Björn Lobenwein	No other competitors		
2000–10	No pairs competitors				
2011	St. Pölten	Stina Martini; Severin Kiefer	No other competitors		
2012	Graz	Stina Martini; Severin Kiefer	No other competitors		
2013	Vienna	Stina Martini; Severin Kiefer	No other competitors		
2014	Salzburg	Miriam Ziegler; Severin Kiefer	No other competitors		
2015	Dornbirn	Miriam Ziegler; Severin Kiefer	No other competitors		
2016	Innsbruck	Miriam Ziegler; Severin Kiefer	No other competitors		
2017	Graz	Miriam Ziegler; Severin Kiefer	No other competitors		
2018	Vienna	Miriam Ziegler; Severin Kiefer	No other competitors		
2019	Gmunden	No pairs competitors			
2020	Klagenfurt	Miriam Ziegler; Severin Kiefer	Olivia Boys-Eddy; Livio Mayr	No other competitors	
2021	Linz	Miriam Ziegler; Severin Kiefer	No other competitors		
2022	Graz	Miriam Ziegler; Severin Kiefer	No other competitors		
2023	St. Pölten	Sophia Schaller; Livio Mayr	No other competitors		
2024	Feldkirch	Sophia Schaller; Livio Mayr	No other competitors		
2025	Dornbirn	Sophia Schaller; Livio Mayr	Gabriella Izzo; Luc Maierhofer	No other competitors	
2026	Innsbruck	Gabriella Izzo; Luc Maierhofer	Sophia Schaller; Livio Mayr	No other competitors	

=== Ice dance ===
Senior ice dance event medalists
Year	Location	Gold	Silver	Bronze	Ref.
1937	Vienna	Edith Winkelmann; Walter Löhner	Trude Wagner; Fritz Staniek	Jutta Stöhr; Fritz Hackl	
1938	Vienna	Edith Winkelmann; Walter Löhner	Trude Wagner; Fritz Staniek	Jutta Stöhr; Fritz Hackl	
1939	Mödling	Trude Wagner; Fritz Staniek	Edith Winkelmann; Walter Löhner	Jutta Stöhr; Fritz Hackl	
1940	Vienna	Trude Wagner; Fritz Staniek	Jutta Stöhr; Fritz Hackl	Erna Bauer; Josef Kröpfl	
1941	Semmering	Edith Winkelmann; Walter Löhner	Jutta Stöhr; Fritz Hackl	Hertha Branowitzer; Rudolf Plaschke	
1942	Innsbruck	Jutta Stöhr; Fritz Hackl	Grete Partmann-Schütze; Franz Heinlein	Grete Linsbauer; Rene Fischer	
1943	Mödling	Jutta Stöhr; Fritz Hackl	Hermi Nittmann; Fritz Staniek	Mitzi Schubert; Franz Forster	
1944–45	No competitions due to World War II				
1946	Vienna	Hertha Branowitzer; Walter Plaschke	Erna Kröpfl; Josef Kröpfl	Gerda Staniek (née Schilling); Fritz Staniek	
1947	Graz	Hertha Branowitzer; Walter Plaschke	Gerda Staniek (née Schilling); Fritz Staniek	Erna Kröpfl; Josef Kröpfl	
1948	Vienna	Hertha Branowitzer; Walter Plaschke	Trude Leitner; Rudolf Gregorin	Gerda Staniek (née Schilling); Fritz Staniek	
1949	Graz	Hertha Branowitzer; Walter Plaschke	Trude Leitner; Rudolf Gregorin	Gerda Staniek (née Schilling); Fritz Staniek	
1950	Innsbruck	Hertha Branowitzer; Walter Plaschke	Trude Leitner; Rudolf Gregorin	Helga Binder; Herr Braun	
1951	Vienna	Paulin Haffner; Herbert Huber	Trude Leitner; Rudolf Gregorin	Helga Binder; Edwin Fuhrich	
1952	Vienna	Paulin Haffner; Herbert Huber	Ilse Reitmayer; Hans Kutschera	Helga Binder; Edwin Fuhrich	
1953	St. Anton am Arlberg	Helga Binder; Edwin Fuhrich	Lucia Fischer; Rudolf Zorn	Luise Lehner; Hans Kutschera	
1954	Graz	Helga Binder; Edwin Fuhrich	Edith Peikert; Hans Kutschera	Lucie Fischer; Rudolf Zorn	
1955	Vienna	Edith Peikert; Hans Kutschera	Lucia Fischer; Rudolf Zorn	Liesl Ellend; Konrad Lienert	
1956	Vienna	Edith Peikert; Hans Kutschera	Lucia Fischer; Rudolf Zorn	Brigitte Gröger; Alois Mitterhuber	
1957	Vienna	Edith Peikert; Hans Kutschera	Lucia Fischer; Rudolf Zorn	Brigitte Gröger; Alois Mitterhuber	
1958	Spittal an der Drau	Lucia Zorn; Rudolf Zorn	Edith Peikert; Alois Mitterhuber	Helga Michelmayer; Gerald Felsinger	
1959	Vienna	Lucia Zorn; Rudolf Zorn	Helga Michelmayer; Norbert Felsinger	Christl Trebesiner; Herbert Rothkappl	
1960	Vienna	Helga Michlmayer; Gerald Felsinger	Christl Trebesiner; Herbert Rothkappl	Inge Wagner; Fritz Klein	
1961	Vienna	Christl Trebesiner; Gerald Felsinger	Helga Kandl; Karl Wondrak	Inge Wagner; Fritz Klein	
1962	Vienna	Christl Trebesiner; Gerald Felsinger	Hilde Strohmeyer; Helmut Strohmeyer	Gertrude Holik; Herbert Holik	
1963	Vienna	Christl Trebesiner; Gerald Felsinger	Hilde Strohmeyer; Helmut Strohmeyer	Heidi Metzger; Herbert Rothkappl	
1964	Innsbruck	Christl Trebesiner; Gerald Felsinger	Heidi Metzger; Herbert Rothkappl	Hilde Strohmeyer; Helmut Strohmeyer	
1965	Klagenfurt	Christl Trebesiner; Gerald Felsinger	Heidi Metzger; Herbert Rothkappl	Brigitte Thor; Ernst Thor	
1966	Salzburg	Christl Trebesiner; Herbert Rothkappl	Heidi Metzger; Gerald Felsinger	Brigitte Thor; Ernst Thor	
1967	Vienna	Heidi Metzger; Herbert Rothkappl	Brigitte Thor; Ernst Thor	Ingrid Koller; Adrian Perco	
1968	Feldkirch	Heidi Metzger; Herbert Rothkappl	Ingrid Koller; Adrian Perco	Brigitte Scheijbal; Herr Jaschek	
1969	Graz	Elfriede Rupp; Walter Leschetizky	Ingrid Koller; Herbert Rothkappl	Brigitte Scheijbal; Herr Jaschek	
1970	Innsbruck	Elfriede Rupp; Walter Leschetizky	Brigitte Scheijbal; Herr Jaschek	Fräulein Quitta; Herr Benedikt	
1971	Klagenfurt	Agnes Arco; Adrian Perco	Elisabeth Luksch; Rudolf Hauptner	No other competitors	
1972	Graz	Brigitte Scheijbal; Walter Leschetizky	Agnes Arco; Adrian Perco	Elisabeth Luksch; Rudolf Hauptner	
1973	Innsbruck	Brigitte Scheijbal; Walter Leschetizky	Agnes Arco; Adrian Perco	Elisabeth Luksch; Rudolf Hauptner	
1974	Vienna	Brigitte Scheijbal; Walter Leschetizky	Susanne Handschmann; Peter Handschmann	Elisabeth Luksch; Rudolf Hauptner	
1975	Klagenfurt	Susanne Handschmann; Peter Handschmann	Agnes Arco; Rudolf Hauptner	Elisabeth Luksch; Peter Schübl	
1976	Vienna	Susanne Handschmann; Peter Handschmann	Elisabeth Luksch; Peter Schübl	Claudia Koch; Ronald Schranz	
1977	Lustenau	Susanne Handschmann; Peter Handschmann	No other competitors		
1978	Zeltweg	Susanne Handschmann; Peter Handschmann	Elisabeth Luksch; Peter Schübl	Angelika Karas; Wolfgang Czerny	
1979	Klagenfurt	Susanne Handschmann; Peter Handschmann	Claudia Koch; Peter Schübl	No other competitors	
1980	Vienna	Susanne Handschmann; Peter Handschmann	Maria Kniffer; Manfred Hübler	Edith Rodinger; Harald Rodinger	
1981	Innsbruck	Maria Kniffer; Manfred Hübler	Kathrin Beck; Christoff Beck	Nadascha Tangunoff; Wolfgang Czerny	
1982	Graz	Maria Kniffer; Manfred Hübler	Kathrin Beck; Christoff Beck	Nadascha Tangunoff; Wolfgang Czerny	
1983	Klagenfurt	Kathrin Beck; Christoff Beck	Monika Müksch; Herbert Holik	Fräulein Nahler; Herr Prohaska	
1984	Vienna	Kathrin Beck; Christoff Beck	Maria Kniffer; Manfred Hübler	Andrea Dekitsch; Herbert Holik	
1985	Graz	Kathrin Beck; Christoff Beck	Ursula Holik; Herbert Holik	Daniela Mutschlechner; Deddo Mörtzl	
1986	Linz	Kathrin Beck; Christoff Beck	Ursula Holik; Herbert Holik	Daniela Mutschlechner; Deddo Mörtzl	
1987	Klagenfurt	Kathrin Beck; Christoff Beck	Ursula Holik; Herbert Holik	Fräulein Nahler; Herr Kucharsk	
1988	Innsbruck	Kathrin Beck; Christoff Beck	No other competitors		
1989	Linz	Ursula Holik; Herbert Holik	Monika Müksch; Bernhard Hatzl	Andrea Hofmann; Axel-Ernst Kummer	
1990	Klagenfurt	Monika Müksch; Bernhard Hatzl	No other competitors		
1991	Innsbruck	Daria-Larissa Maritczak; Ihor-Andrij Maritczak	Monika Müksch; Bernhard Hatzl	Bettina Bastl; Klaus Oberleitner	
1992	Lustenau	Daria-Larissa Maritczak; Ihor-Andrij Maritczak	Angelika Führing; Peter Wilczek	Karin Galle; Rolf Galle	
1993	Vienna	Angelika Führing; Peter Wilczek	No other competitors		
1994	Klagenfurt	Angelika Führing; Peter Wilczek	Allison MacLean; Konrad Schaub	Sonja Sofska; Pavel Skulecs	
1995	Vienna	Allison MacLean; Konrad Schaub	Andrea Sopper; Pavel Skulecs	No other competitors	
1996	Vienna	Allison MacLean; Konrad Schaub	Andrea Sopper; Pavel Skulecs	Ursula Peschorn; Werner Raab	
1997	St. Pölten	Angelika Führing; Bruno Ellinger	Andrea Sopper; Pavel Skulecs	Elke Rogl; Rory Hassett	
1998	Vienna	Angelika Führing; Bruno Ellinger	No other competitors		
1999	Graz	Angelika Führing; Bruno Ellinger	Birgit Hermann; Gert Herrmann	No other competitors	
2000	Vienna	Angelika Führing; Bruno Ellinger	Marina Rebernig; Robert Pusch	No other competitors	
2001	Salzburg	Miriam Sinzinger; Jamie Ferguson	Marina Rebernig; Robert Pusch	No other competitors	
2002	Vienna	Barbara Herzog; Dmitri Matsjuk	Marina Rebernig; Robert Pusch	Maria Isabel Gusbeth; Rory Hassett	
2003	Dornbirn	Barbara Herzog; Dmitri Matsjuk	Marina Rebernig; Robert Pusch	No other competitors	
2004	Vienna	Barbara Herzog; Dmitri Matsjuk	No other competitors		
2005	Innsbruck	No ice dance competitors			
2006	Innsbruck	Barbora Silná; Dmitri Matsjuk	No other competitors		
2007	Vienna	Barbora Silná; Dmitri Matsjuk	No other competitors		
2008	St. Pölten	Barbora Silná; Dmitri Matsjuk	No other competitors		
2009	Linz	Barbora Silná; Dmitri Matsjuk	No other competitors		
2010	Innsbruck	Kira Geil; Dmitri Matsjuk	No other competitors		
2011	St. Pölten	Kira Geil; Tobias Eisenbauer	Barbora Silná; Juri Kurakin	Rachel Hofer; Christoph Klier	
2012	Graz	Barbora Silná; Juri Kurakin	Kira Geil; Tobias Eisenbauer	No other competitors	
2013	Vienna	Kira Geil; Tobias Eisenbauer	Barbora Silná; Juri Kurakin	No other competitors	
2014	Salzburg	Kira Geil; Tobias Eisenbauer	Barbora Silná; Juri Kurakin	No other competitors	
2015	Dornbirn	Barbora Silná; Juri Kurakin	No other competitors		
2016	Innsbruck	Barbora Silná; Juri Kurakin	No other competitors		
2017	Graz	Regina Yankovska; Dmitri Matsjuk	No other competitors		
2018–22	No ice dance competitors				
2023	St. Pölten	Corinna Huber; Patrik Huber	No other competitors		
2024	Feldkirch	Corinna Huber; Patrik Huber	No other competitors		
2025	Dornbirn	Corinna Huber; Patrik Huber	No other competitors		
2026	Innsbruck	Anita Straub; Andreas Straub	Corinna Huber; Patrik Huber	Kira Frisch; Nicholas Gambacini	

== Junior medalists ==
=== Men's singles ===
Junior men's event medalists
Year	Location	Gold	Silver	Bronze	Ref.
1991	Linz	Daniel Kappacher	Nikolaus Adler	Roland Burghart	
1992	Vienna	Daniel Kappacher	Roland Burghart	Florian Tuma	
1993	Linz	Florian Tuma	Markus Haider	Roland Burghart	
1994	Vienna	Florian Tuma	Roland Burghart	Markus Haider	
1995	Vienna	Florian Tuma	Georg Ganner	Stefan Hofer	
1996	Linz	Florian Tuma	Markus Haider	Clemens Jonas	
1997	Graz	Florian Tuma	Clemens Jonas	Stefan Hofer	
1998	Feldkirch	Christian Horvath	Clemens Jonas	Christian Rauchbauer	
1999	St. Pölten	Clemens Jonas	Philipp Morscher	Florian Mistelbauer	
2000	Innsbruck	Christian Horvath	Clemens Jonas	Philipp Morscher	
2001	St. Pölten	Christian Horvath	Christian Rauchbauer	Philipp Morscher	
2002	Zell am See	Florian Mistelbauer	Viktor Pfeifer	Manuel Koll	
2003	Gmunden	Viktor Pfeifer	Christian Rauchbauer	Florian Mistelbauer	
2004	Graz	Viktor Pfeifer	Christian Rauchbauer	Manuel Koll	
2005	Vienna	Viktor Pfeifer	Manuel Koll	Zabato Bebe	
2006	Innsbruck	Manuel Koll	Zabato Bebe	Severin Kiefer	
2007	St. Pölten	Severin Kiefer	Mario-Rafael Ionian	Tobias Steindl	
2008	Salzburg	Severin Kiefer	Mario-Rafael Ionian	No other competitors	
2009	Linz	Mario-Rafael Ionian	Severin Kiefer	Maximilian Obsieger	
2010	Innsbruck	Mario-Rafael Ionian	Maximilian Obsieger	Clement Ledoux	
2011	St. Pölten	Simon-Gabriel Ionian	Maximilian Obsieger	No other competitors	
2012	Graz	Bernard Pauli	Manuel Drechsler	Albert Mück	
2013	Vienna	Simon-Gabriel Ionian	Albert Mück	Manuel Drechsler	
2014	Salzburg	Albert Mück	Manuel Drechsler	Livio Mayr	
2015	Dornbirn	Johannes Maierhofer	Simon-Gabriel Ionian	Manuel Drechsler	
2016	Innsbruck	Luc Maierhofer	Johannes Maierhofer	Livio Mayr	
2017	Graz	Anton Skoficz	Johannes Maierhofer	Livio Mayr	
2018	Vienna	Anton Skoficz	Valentin Eisenbauer	Sebastian Mörtl	
2019	Gmunden	Luc Maierhofer	Anton Skoficz	Valentin Eisenbauer	
2020	Klagenfurt	Alexander Charnagalov	Ralph-Patrick Filipin	Patrik Huber	
2021	Linz	Alexander Charnagalov	Patrik Huber	Nuwan David Rondon	
2022	Graz	Tobia Oellerer	Alexander Charnagalov	Daniel Ruis	
2023	St. Pölten	Tobia Oellerer	No other competitors		
2024	Feldkirch	Daniel Ruis	No other competitors		
2025	Dornbirn	Tobia Oellerer	Maksym Petrychenko	Daniel Ruis	
2026	Innsbruck	Maksym Petrychenko	Daniel Ruis	Ivan Siedykh	

=== Women's singles ===
Junior women's event medalists
Year	Location	Gold	Silver	Bronze	Ref.
1991	Linz	Andrea Kus	Melanie Friedreich	Eva Sonnleitner	
1992	Vienna	Andrea Kus	Petra Hrdlicka	Martina Feichtinger	
1993	Linz	Andrea Kus	Martina Kus	Lisa Pleyer	
1994	Vienna	Andrea Kus	Julia Lautowa	Petra Hrdlicka	
1995	Vienna	Manuela Brandstätter	Petra Hrdlicka	Karin Brandstätter	
1996	Linz	Karin Brandstätter	Jubilee Jenna Mandl	Andrea Kaliwoda	
1997	Graz	Julia Lautowa	Jubilee Jenna Mandl	Anna Wenzel	
1998	Feldkirch	Anna Wenzel	Karin Brandstätter	Elisabeth Angerer	
1999	St. Pölten	Elisabeth Angerer	Jubilee Jenna Mandl	Anna Wenzel	
2000	Innsbruck	Karin Strebl	Sarah Mooslechner	Jennifer Le Guilloux	
2001	St. Pölten	Astrid Mangi	Kathrin Freudelsperger	Denise Kögl	
2002	Zell am See	Jubilee Jenna Mandl	Jennifer Le Guilloux	Denise Kögl	
2003	Gmunden	Denise Kögl	Jennifer Le Guilloux	Kathrin Freudelsperger	
2004	Graz	Denise Kögl	Andrea Kreuzer	Astrid Mangi	
2005	Vienna	Katrin Kunisch	Astrid Mangi	Stephanie Ellensohn	
2006	Innsbruck	Kathrin Freudelsperger	Astrid Mangi	Nicole Franclova	
2007	St. Pölten	Kerstin Frank	Denise Kögl	Katrin Kunisch	
2008	Salzburg	Miriam Ziegler	Belinda Schönberger	Stephanie Ellensohn	
2009	Linz	Victoria Hübler	Sabrina Schulz	Alessandra Laurencik	
2010	Innsbruck	Victoria Hübler	Belinda Schönberger	Alessandra Laurencik	
2011	St. Pölten	Victoria Hübler	Lara Eisenbauer	Jenny Lin	
2012	Graz	Sabrina Schulz	Victoria Hübler	Natascha Zangl	
2013	Vienna	Victoria Hübler	Sabrina Schulz	Nina-Larissa Wolfslast	
2014	Salzburg	Lara Nikola Roth	Sophie Almassy	Anita Kapferer	
2015	Dornbirn	Lara Nikola Roth	Alexandra Philippova	Anna-Sophia Miesenberger	
2016	Innsbruck	Alisa Stomakhina	Nathalie Klotz	Violette Ivanoff	
2017	Graz	Alisa Stomakhina	Sophia Schaller	Celine Weiss	
2018	Vienna	Stefanie Pesendorfer	Sophia Schaller	Olga Mikutina	
2019	Gmunden	Olga Mikutina	Stefanie Pesendorfer	Sophie-Laureen Günther	
2020	Klagenfurt	Olga Mikutina	Stefanie Pesendorfer	Dorotea Partonjic	
2021	Linz	Dorotea Leitgeb	Jasmin Elsebaie	Lina Salzer	
2022	Graz	Dorotea Leitgeb	Paola Jurisic	Jasmin Elsebaie	
2023	St. Pölten	Hannah Frank	Flora Marie Schaller	Dorotea Leitgeb	
2024	Feldkirch	Flora Marie Schaller	Hannah Frank	Sara Höfer	
2025	Dornbirn	Sara Höfer	Maxima Rebernig	Alisah Reiterer	
2026	Innsbruck	Nathalie Yonemori	Hannah Frank	Eles Namazalieva	

=== Pairs ===
Junior pairs event medalists
Year	Location	Gold	Silver	Bronze	Ref.
1991	Linz	Ulrike Gerstl; Björn Lobenwein	No other competitors		
1992	Vienna	Ulrike Gerstl; Björn Lobenwein	No other competitors		
1993	Linz	Ulrike Gerstl; Björn Lobenwein	No other competitors		
1994	Vienna	Ulrike Gerstl; Björn Lobenwein	No other competitors		
1995	Vienna	Ulrike Gerstl; Björn Lobenwein	No other competitors		
1996	Linz	Ulrike Gerstl; Björn Lobenwein	No other competitors		
1997–2009	No junior pairs competitors				
2010	Innsbruck	Stina Martini; Severin Kiefer	No other competitors		
2011–16	No junior pairs competitors				
2017	Graz	Heidrun Pipal; Erik Pipal	No other competitors		
2018	Vienna	Heidrun Pipal; Erik Pipal	No other competitors		
2019	Gmunden	Heidrun Pipal; Erik Pipal	Sara Jane Dana; Livio Mayr	No other competitors	
2020–22	No junior pairs competitors				
2023	St. Pölten	Giorgia Ghedini; Luc Maierhofer	No other competitors		
2024	Feldkirch	No junior pairs competitors			
2025	Dornbirn	Paola Jurisic; Michail Savenkov	No other competitors		
2026	Innsbruck	Paola Jurisic; Michail Savenkov	No other competitors		

=== Ice dance ===
Junior ice dance event medalists
Year	Location	Gold	Silver	Bronze	Ref.
1991	Linz	Daria-Larissa Maritczak; Ihor-Andrij Maritczak	Angelika Führing; Peter Wilczek	No other competitors	
1992	Vienna	Angelika Führing; Peter Wilczek	No other competitors		
1993	Linz	Andrea Sopper; Michael Obert	No other competitors		
1994	Vienna	Sabine Pichler; Alexander Hübler	Verena Seidl; Stefan Grampelhuber	No other competitors	
1995	Vienna	Sabine Pichler; Alexander Hübler	No other competitors		
1996	Linz	Sabine Pichler; Romedius Mitterschiffthal	Miriam Sinzinger; Ingo Feinerer	Birgit Hermann; Gert Herrmann	
1997	Graz	Miriam Sinzinger; Ingo Feinerer	Birgit Hermann; Gert Herrmann	No other competitors	
1998	Feldkirch	Miriam Sinzinger; Ingo Feinerer	Sabine Pichler; David Vincour	Birgit Hermann; Gert Herrmann	
1999	St. Pölten	Sabine Pichler; David Vincour	No other competitors		
2000	Innsbruck	Barbara Herzog; David Vincour	No other competitors		
2001	St. Pölten	Barbara Herzog; David Vincour	No other competitors		
2002	Zell am See	Barbara Herzog; Dmytro Matsyuk	No other competitors		
2003	Gmunden	Barbara Herzog; Dmytro Matsyuk	Julia Wildeis; Gabriel Mistelbauer	No other competitors	
2004	Graz	Simona Kopsova; Gabriel Mistelbauer	No other competitors		
2005	Vienna	Simona Kopsova; Gabriel Mistelbauer	No other competitors		
2006	Innsbruck	No junior ice dance competitors			
2007	St. Pölten	Linda-Paula Keider; Christoph Klier	No other competitors		
2008	Salzburg	Sonja Pauli; Tobias Eisenbauer	Linda-Paula Keider; Christoph Klier	Christine Degl; Michael Degl	
2009	Linz	Sonja Pauli; Tobias Eisenbauer	Linda-Paula Keider; Christoph Klier	Christine Degl; Michael Degl	
2010	Innsbruck	Sonja Pauli; Tobias Eisenbauer	No other competitors		
2011	St. Pölten	Chiara Noe; Lorenz Hörcsöky	No other competitors		
2012	Graz	Christine Smith; Simon Eisenbauer	No other competitors		
2013	Vienna	Christine Smith; Simon Eisenbauer	No other competitors		
2014	Salzburg	Christine Smith; Simon Eisenbauer	No other competitors		
2015	Dornbirn	Christine Smith; Simon Eisenbauer	No other competitors		
2016	Innsbruck	Elizaveta Orlova; Stephano Schuster	No other competitors		
2017	Graz	Elizaveta Orlova; Stephano Schuster	Larissa Freyler; Youssef Zaki-Khalil	No other competitors	
2018	Vienna	No junior ice dance competitors			
2019	Gmunden	Marina Philippova; Vadym Kravtsov	Corinna Huber; Patrik Huber	No other competitors	
2020	Klagenfurt	Marina Philippova; Vadym Kravtsov	Corinna Huber; Patrik Huber	No other competitors	
2021	Linz	Corinna Huber; Patrik Huber	No other competitors		
2022	Graz	Corinna Huber; Patrik Huber	Anita Straub; Andreas Straub	No other competitors	
2023	St. Pölten	Anita Straub; Andreas Straub	No other competitors		
2024	Feldkirch	Anita Straub; Andreas Straub	Elisabeth Havers; Leo Havers	No other competitors	
2025	Dornbirn	Anita Straub; Andreas Straub	No other competitors		
2026	Innsbruck	No junior ice dance competitors			

== Records ==
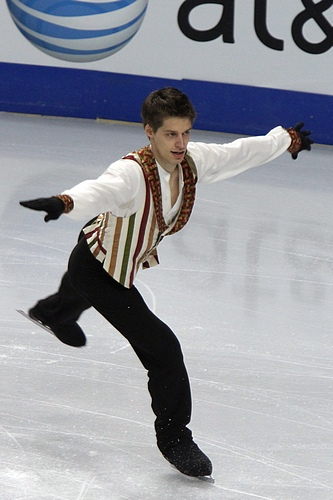
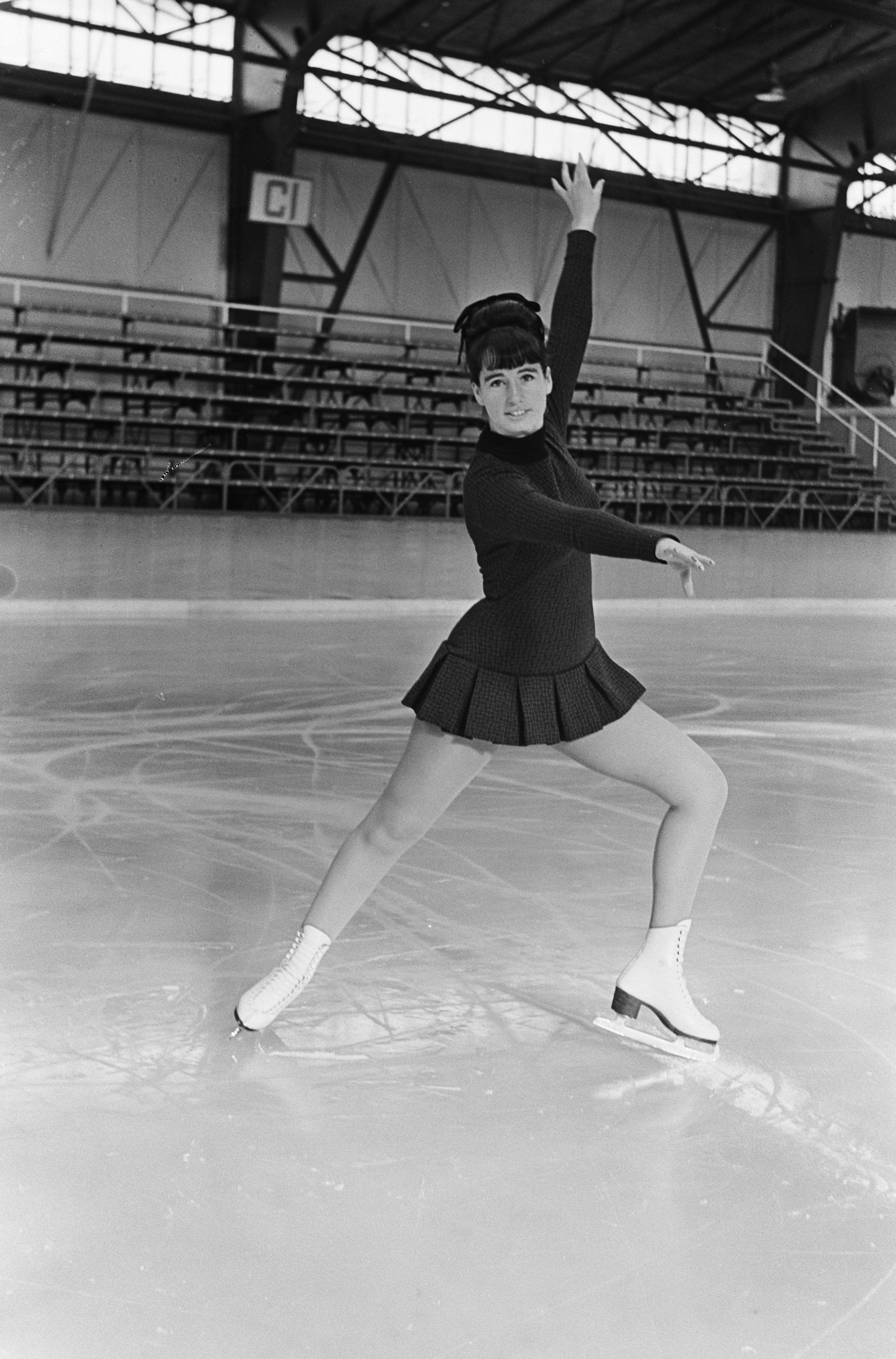
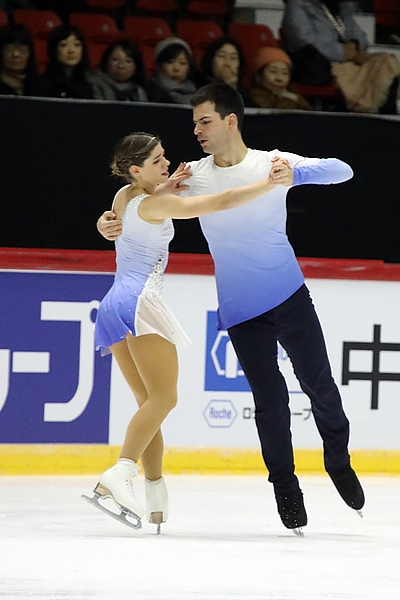
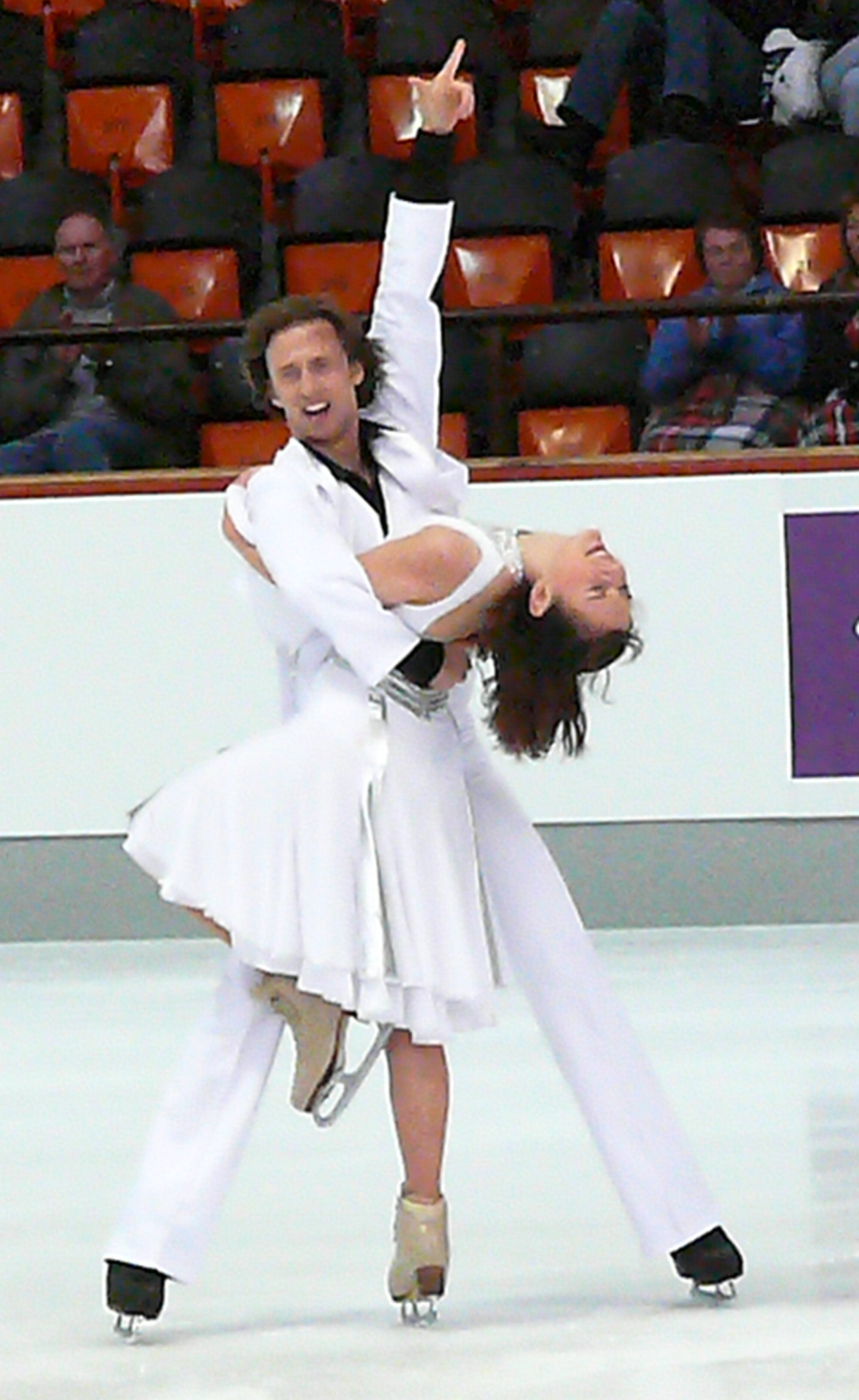
From left to right: Viktor Pfeifer won nine Austrian Championship titles in men's singles; Regine Heitzer won seven Austrian Championship titles in women's singles; Miriam Ziegler and Severin Kiefer won nine Austrian Championship titles in pair skating; and Dmitri Matsjuk won eight Austrian Championship titles in ice dance, four of which were with Barbora Silná.

Records
Discipline	Most championship titles			
Discipline	Skater(s)	No.	Years	Ref.
Men's singles	Viktor Pfeifer	9	2003; 2005–06; 2009–14	
Women's singles	Regine Heitzer	7	1960–66	
Pairs	Miriam Ziegler; Severin Kiefer	9	2014–18; 2020–22	
Pairs	Severin Kiefer; (Note: Severin Kiefer won three championship titles while partnered with Stina Martini (2011–13), and nine with Miriam Ziegler (2014–22).)	12	2011–22	
Ice dance	Dmitri Matsjuk; (Note: Dmitri Matsjuk won three championship titles while partnered with Barbara Herzog (2002–04), four with Barbora Silná (2006–09), and one with Kira Geil (2010).)	8	2002–04; 2006–10	
