= Ratzenhofer =

Ratzenhofer is an Austrian surname. Notable people with the surname include:

- Gustav Ratzenhofer (1842–1904), Austrian officer, philosopher, and sociologist
- Emil Ratzenhofer (born 1914, date of death unknown) and Herta Ratzenhofer (1921–2010), two Austrian pair skaters
