= Staniek =

Staniek is a Polish surname. Notable people with the surname include:

- Gerda Staniek (1925–1985), Austrian athlete
- Marcin Staniek (born 1980), Polish footballer
- Ryszard Staniek (born 1971), Polish footballer
