= Ralph Burghart =

Austrian figure skater and coach

Personal information
- Born: 16 September 1966 (age 59) Vienna, Austria

Figure skating career
- Country: Austria

Ralph Burghart (born 16 September 1966) is an Austrian figure skating coach and former competitor. A seven-time Austrian national champion, he competed at the 1992 Winter Olympics and placed 18th.

== Personal life ==
Ralph Burghart was born on 16 September 1966 in Vienna, Austria. He married U.S. figure skater Rory Flack in December 1992. They have two sons, Rendell, born 28 September 1993, and Remington, born 17 January 1997. Their elder son plays tennis for Division 1, Eastern Washington University and the younger competes in figure skating. Burghart and Flack divorced by 2009. He is now married to Cheryl Burghart, who was crowned Mrs. D.C. United States in 2019.

== Career ==
Burghart began skating at age four and joined the EKE Vienna skating club in 1975. He became Austria's senior national champion for the first time in the 1984–85 season and was selected to compete at the 1985 European Championships. He placed 13th at the event in Gothenburg, Sweden.

In 1988, Burghart won his third national title. After placing 14th at the European Championships in Prague, Czechoslovakia, he competed at his first World Championships, finishing 16th in Budapest, Hungary. Burghart finished in the top ten at the 1990 European Championships in Leningrad, Soviet Union. He ranked seventh in the compulsory figures, tenth in the short program, ninth in the free skate, and ninth overall.

In the 1991–92 season, Burghart won his seventh national title and placed 11th at the 1992 European Championships in Lausanne, Switzerland. He represented Austria at the 1992 Winter Olympics in Albertville, France, finishing 18th. He ended his competitive career after his fifth appearance at the World Championships

After retiring from competition, Burghart skated professionally in the Ice Capades and began working as a coach in Alaska. His best known student is Keegan Messing.

== Results ==
International
Event	82–83	83–84	84–85	85–86	86–87	87–88	88–89	89–90	90–91	91–92
Winter Olympics										18th
World Champ.						16th	17th	19th	21st	17th
European Champ.			13th		17th	14th	14th	9th	WD	11th
Skate America							10th		9th	
NHK Trophy								12th		7th
Moscow News						8th				
National
Austrian Champ.	2nd	2nd	1st	2nd	1st	1st	1st	1st	1st	1st
WD = Withdrew
