= Anna Wenzel =

Austrian figure skater (born 1980)

Personal information
- Born: 2 February 1980 (age 46) Vienna, Austria
- Height: 1.63 m (5 ft 4 in)

Figure skating career
- Country: Austria
- Skating club: Vienna Ice Skating Club
- Retired: 2002

Anna Wenzel (born 2 February 1980) is an Austrian former competitive figure skater. She is the 2001 Austrian national champion. She reached the free skate at two ISU Championships: the 1998 Junior Worlds in Saint John, New Brunswick, where she placed 20th; and the 2001 Europeans in Bratislava, where she finished 18th. Her older sister, Marie-Theres Wenzel, also competed internationally for Austria.

== Programs ==
Season	Short program	Free skating
2000–01	Suite Espanola by Isaac Albéniz	The Whole Nine Yards by Randy Edelman

== Results ==
JGP: Junior Series / Junior Grand Prix

International
Event	96–97	97–98	98–99	99–00	00–01	01–02
Worlds		26th		35th	35th	
Europeans					18th	
Golden Spin			10th	9th	8th	
Nebelhorn Trophy					15th	
Nepela Memorial		9th			6th	10th
Schäfer Memorial	17th	16th	8th	7th	6th	11th
International: Junior
Junior Worlds		20th				
JGP France		20th				
JGP Hungary			16th			
Grand Prize SNP	13th J					
National
Austrian Champ.	2nd	2nd	2nd	2nd	1st	
J: Junior level
