= Bruno Ellinger =

Bruno Ellinger (born 24 May 1973 in Rosenheim, Germany) is a former competitive ice dancer who represented Austria. Competing with partner Angelika Führing, he won three gold medals at the Austrian Figure Skating Championships from 1997 to 1999.
