= Claudia Kristofics-Binder =

Austrian figure skater

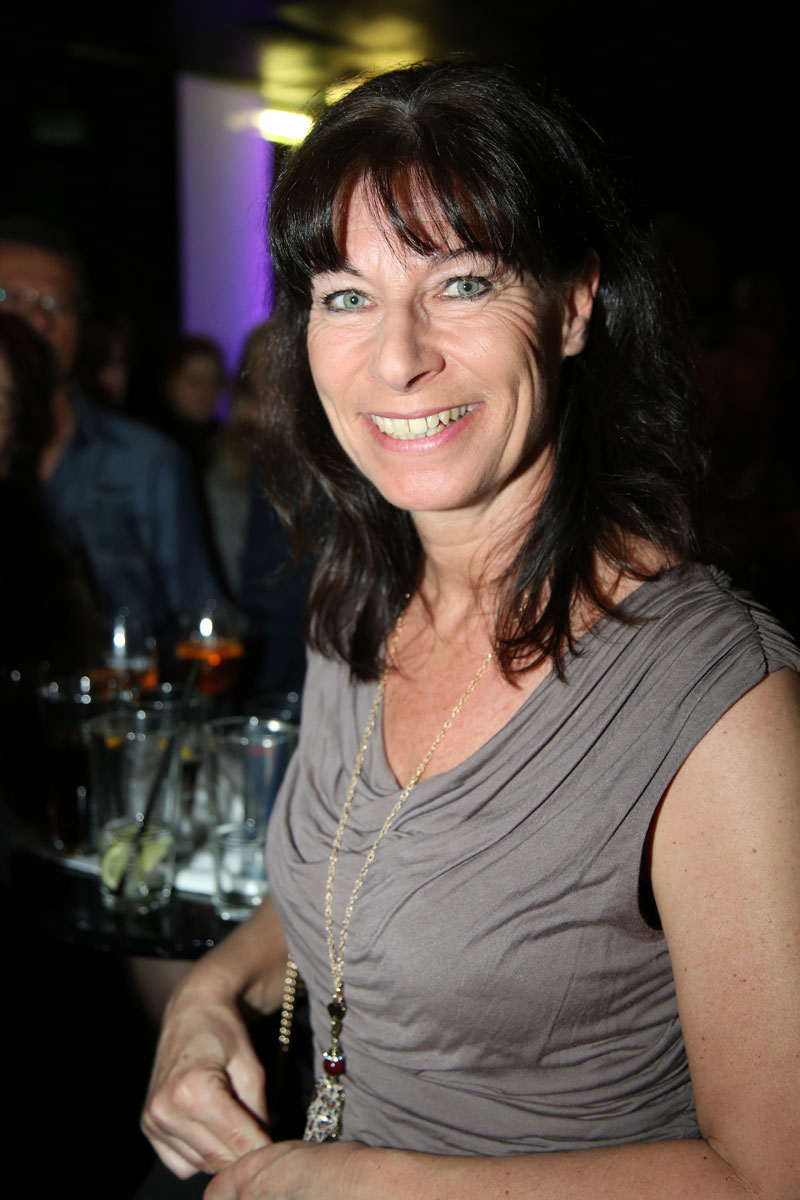
- Claudia Kristofics-Binder in 2015

Personal information
- Born: 5 October 1961 (age 65) Vienna, Austria
- Height: 1.70 m (5 ft 7 in)

Figure skating career
- Country: Austria
- Retired: 1982
Medal record
Representing Austria
Figure skating: Ladies' singles
World Championships
Bronze medal – third place	1982 Copenhagen	Ladies' singles
Bronze medal – third place	1981 Hartford	Ladies' singles
European Championships
Gold medal – first place	1982 Lyon	Ladies' singles
Bronze medal – third place	1981 Innsbruck	Ladies' singles

Claudia Kristofics-Binder (born 5 October 1961) is an Austrian former figure skater. She is a two-time World bronze medalist (1981, 1982) and the 1982 European champion. She represented Austria at the 1976 and 1980 Winter Olympics. She was coached by Carlo Fassi.

She is the younger sister of Austrian figure skater Helmut Kristofics-Binder.

== Results ==
International
Event	75–76	76–77	77–78	78–79	79–80	80–81	81–82
Olympics	16th				7th		
Worlds	16th	11th	13th	7th	5th	3rd	3rd
Europeans	13th	8th			WD	3rd	1st
Skate America							3rd
Skate Canada				2nd		3rd	
Schäfer Memorial			1st				
Prague Skate		1st					
National
Austrian Champ.	3rd	1st	1st	1st	1st	1st	1st

Awards
Preceded by (Austria) Annemarie Moser-Pröll	Austrian Sportswoman of the year 1981 – 1982	Succeeded by (Austria) Gerda Winklbauer
