= Yvonne Pokorny =

Austrian figure skater

Personal information
- Other names: Yvonne Pal

Figure skating career
- Country: Austria
- Retired: 1993

Yvonne Pokorny, later surname: Pal, is an Austrian former competitive figure skater. She is the 1992 Karl Schäfer Memorial bronze medalist and a five-time Austrian national champion. She placed 12th at the 1989 European Championships and 13th at the 1989 World Championships. In 2006, she was listed as an International Technical Specialist for Austria.

== Competitive highlights ==
International
Event	86–87	87–88	88–89	89–90	90–91	91–92	92–93
World Champ.	20th	18th	13th				
European Champ.	14th	20th	12th	16th			
NHK Trophy				12th			
Prague Skate		2nd					
Prize of Moscow News	11th	8th					
Schäfer Memorial							3rd
National
Austrian Champ.		1st	1st	1st	1st	1st	2nd
