= Helmut Kristofics-Binder =

Austrian figure skater

Personal information
- Born: 1960 (age 65–66)

Figure skating career
- Country: Austria
- Retired: c. 1981

Helmut Kristofics-Binder (born 1960) is an Austrian former competitive figure skater. He is a three-time (1979–81) Austrian national champion and competed at seven ISU Championships. His best results were fifth at the 1977 Junior Worlds in Megève, where he was first in figures, and 12th at the 1980 Europeans in Gothenburg.

He is the brother, older by one year, of Austrian figure skater Claudia Kristofics-Binder. Upon retirement, he become an airline pilot.

== Competitive highlights ==
International
Event	1974	1976	1977	1978	1979	1980	1981
World Champ.					18th	18th	
European Champ.				WD	13th	12th	
International: Junior
World Junior Champ.		13th	5th				
National
Austrian Champ.	3rd		3rd	2nd	1st	1st	1st
WD: Withdrew
