= Diana Hinko =

Austrian pair skater

Personal information
- Born: 30 November 1943 (age 82)

Figure skating career
- Country: Austria
- Partner: Heinz Döpfl; Bernd Henhapel
- Coach: Hellmut Seibt
- Skating club: WEV
- Retired: 1960s

Diana Hinko (born 30 November 1943) is an Austrian former pair skater. Competing with Heinz Döpfl, she became a three-time national champion (1959–1961). The pair finished eighth at the 1960 Winter Olympics and fifth at the 1961 European Championships.

After their partnership ended, Hinko teamed with Bernd Henhapel (or Bernhard Henhappel) and won the 1962 Austrian national title.

== Results ==
=== Pairs with Döpfl ===
International
Event	1957	1958	1959	1960	1961
Winter Olympics				8th	
World Championships			8th	7th	
European Championships	7th	12th	8th	7th	5th
National
Austrian Championships			1st	1st	1st

=== Pairs with Henhapel ===
International
Event	1962
World Championships	12th
National
Austrian Championships	1st
