= Brigitte Scheijbal =

Austrian former ice dancer

Figure skating career
- Country: Austria
- Partner: Walter Leschetizky; Kurt Jaschek
- Skating club: Wiener Eislauf-Verein
- Retired: c. 1974

Brigitte Scheijbal is an Austrian former ice dancer. Competing with Walter Leschetizky, she became a three-time Austrian national champion. They competed at two European and two World Championships in the 1970s. The duo belonged to Wiener Eislauf-Verein.

Earlier in her career, Scheijbal had a partnership with Kurt Jaschek. They skated together at two World Championships.

== Competitive highlights ==
=== With Leschetizky ===
International
Event	1972	1973	1974
World Championships		18th	19th
European Championships	15th		15th
National
Austrian Championships	1st	1st	1st

=== With Jaschek ===
International
Event	1970	1971
World Championships	17th	20th
