= Allison MacLean =

Canadian-Austrian former ice dancer

Allison MacLean (born in Edmonton, Alberta) is a Canadian-Austrian former ice dancer who competed for Canada and Austria. With Konrad Schaub, she is the 1995 Karl Schäfer Memorial bronze medalist and a two-time Austrian national champion. They competed in the final segment at four ISU Championships.

== Career ==
MacLean teamed up with Konrad Schaub in 1981. They worked their way up the Canadian categories, from juvenile to senior. Representing Canada, they placed fifth at the 1988 World Junior Championships in Brisbane, Australia. They continued on the junior level the following season, winning bronze at the Merano Autumn Trophy in Merano, Italy, and at the Canadian Championships.

In 1992, MacLean/Schaub moved to Vienna, Austria, and chose Peter Schubl as their coach. MacLean was granted citizenship in 1994, enabling the team to represent Austria internationally. They would win two Austrian national titles and bronze at the 1995 Karl Schäfer Memorial. They qualified to the free dance at three senior-level ISU Championships, finishing 16th at the 1995 European Championships in Dortmund, Germany; 18th at the 1995 World Championships in Birmingham, England; and 18th at the 1996 World Championships in Edmonton, Alberta, Canada.

Upon their retirement from competitive skating, MacLean/Schaub were the world's longest-standing team, having skated together for 15 years.

== Competitive highlights ==
With Schaub

International
Event	87–88^{1}	88–89^{1}	93–94^{2}	94–95^{2}	95–96^{2}
World Champ.				18th	18th
European Champ.				16th	
Skate Canada				8th	
Schäfer Memorial					3rd
Skate Israel					5th
International: Junior
World Junior Champ.	5th				
Merano Trophy	3rd J				
National
Austrian Champ.			2nd	1st	1st
Canadian Champ.		3rd J			
J = Junior level^{1} For Canada^{2} For Austria
