= Helli Sengstschmid =

Austrian figure skater

Personal information
- Full name: Helene Sengstschmid-Tunner
- Born: 21 February 1944 (age 82) Vienna, Nazi Germany
- Height: 1.67 m (5 ft 5 1/2 in)

Figure skating career
- Country: Austria
- Coach: Steiner; Appeltauer; Wenninger; Karl Schäfer
- Skating club: Cottage Engelmann, Vienna

Helene (Helli) Sengstschmid-Tunner (born 21 February 1944) is an Austrian former figure skater. She won two medals at the Winter Universiade – bronze in 1964 and silver in 1968. She placed fourth at two European Championships and ninth at the 1964 Winter Olympics.

== Personal life ==
Helene Sengstschmid was born on 21 February 1944 in Vienna, Austria (then part of Nazi Germany). After taking her school-leaving exam, she studied sports and English. In 1965, she participated in the Semperit-Rallye with Peter Tunner and married him the same year. She moved to Innsbruck, where she gave birth to her daughter, Sabine, in 1966. Her husband died in 2012.

== Career ==
A member of Cottage Engelmann in Vienna, Sengstschmid was coached by Mr. Steiner, Mrs. Appeltauer, Mr. Wenninger, and Karl Schäfer. When she was 15, Schäfer invited Sengstschmid to practice in the United States for half a year. She lived with his family while training in Lake Placid, New York.

Sengstschmid often received the highest scores in the free skate at the Austrian Championships but always finished second or third overall behind Regine Heitzer. At the 1961 European Championships, she ranked 12th in compulsory figures but rose to sixth overall after the free skate. She was the first female skater to perform a triple Salchow jump.

Sengstschmid finished fourth at the 1962 Europeans, 12th at the 1962 Worlds, and 9th at the 1963 Worlds.

In the 1963–64 season, she placed fifth at the 1964 Europeans and then competed at the 1964 Winter Olympics in Innsbruck. Sengstschmid ranked 18th in the compulsory figures, third in the free skate, and ninth overall. She went on to win the bronze medal at the 1964 Winter Universiade in Špindlerův Mlýn and place 12th at the 1964 Worlds.

Sengstschmid was fourth at the 1965 Europeans and ninth at the 1965 Worlds. She paused her career due to her pregnancy and returned to competition after giving birth to her daughter. In January 1968, she won silver at the Winter Universiade in Innsbruck.

Sengstschmid worked as a coach at Innsbruck's figure skating club, UEK, and as a secondary school teacher for English and gymnastics until her retirement in 2004.

== Results ==
International
Event	60–61	61–62	62–63	63–64	64–65	67–68
Winter Olympics				9th		
World Champ.		12th	9th	12th	9th	
European Champ.	6th	4th		5th	4th	
Universiade				3rd		2nd
National
Austrian Champ.						
WD: Withdrew
