= Viktor Pfeifer =

Austrian figure skater

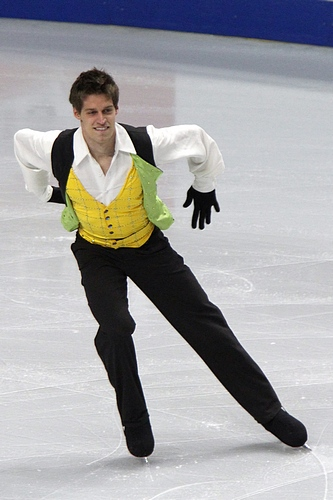
- Viktor Pfeifer at the 2010 Skate America

Personal information
- Born: 16 May 1987 (age 39) Graz, Austria

Figure skating career
- Country: Austria
- Discipline: Men's singles
- Began skating: 1995
- Retired: May 27, 2014

Medal record
Austrian Championships
Gold medal – first place	2003 Dornbirn	Singles
Gold medal – first place	2005 Innsbruck	Singles
Gold medal – first place	2006 Innsbruck	Singles
Gold medal – first place	2009 Linz	Singles
Gold medal – first place	2010 Innsbruck	Singles
Gold medal – first place	2011 St. Pölten	Singles
Gold medal – first place	2012 Graz	Singles
Gold medal – first place	2013 Vienna	Singles
Gold medal – first place	2014 Salzburg	Singles
Silver medal – second place	2004 Vienna	Singles
Silver medal – second place	2007 Vienna	Singles

Viktor Pfeifer (born 16 May 1987) is an Austrian former competitive figure skater. A nine-time Austrian national champion, he has placed as high as eighth at the European Championships (2013) and has competed three times at the Winter Olympics, placing 22nd in 2006, 21st in 2010 and 26th in 2014.

== Career ==
In the 2002–03 season, Pfeifer won Austria's senior national men's title for the first time. The following season, he began competing on the ISU Junior Grand Prix series.

In 2004–05, Pfeifer competed in his second JGP season and finished 12th at the 2005 World Junior Championships. He also made his senior international debut at the 2005 European Championships, where he was 18th. He then placed 23rd at his first senior World Championships.

In 2005–06, Pfeifer again began his season on the junior level, placing fifth in both of his JGP events. He then competed on the senior level at the 2005 Karl Schäfer Memorial, the final opportunity for countries to qualify an Olympic entry. His placement, fifth, gave Austria a spot in the 2006 Olympic men's event. Pfeifer won his third senior national title and was sent to the Olympics where he placed 22nd. He ended his season at the 2006 World Championships, finishing 26th.

In 2006, Pfeifer moved from Austria to train in Aston, Pennsylvania. Two years later, he began training under Priscilla Hill at the Skating Club of Wilmington in Wilmington, Delaware. He stated that Austrian skating officials disagreed with his decision to train abroad and his funding dried up, leading him to consider no longer competing for the country. He was not sent to any ISU Championships in 2007 and 2008.

Pfeifer returned to international competition in autumn 2008. He placed tenth at the 2008 Nebelhorn Trophy and fifth at the 2008 Karl Schäfer Memorial before taking his fourth national title. He was 29th at both the 2009 European Championships and 2009 World Championships.

The final opportunity to qualify for the 2010 Winter Olympics was the 2009 Nebelhorn Trophy in September. Pfeifer placed fifth and earned a spot for Austria in the men's event in Vancouver. Austria consequently resumed funding his training. After winning his fifth national title, Pfeifer was sent to the 2010 European Championships where he placed 17th. He then competed at the 2010 Winter Olympics, placing 21st. His final event of the season was the 2010 World Championships where he was 20th.

In the 2012–13 season, Pfeifer was eighth at the European Championships, the best European result of his career. He then placed 20th at the 2013 World Championships, earning a spot for Austria in the 2014 Olympic men's event.

Pfeifer began coaching at The Skating Club of Wilmington when he was still a competitive skater. He retired from competition on 27 May 2014.

== Personal life ==
Pfeifer began playing the cello as a child and attended a music conservatory in Austria before deciding to focus on skating. He studied business management and economics at the University of Delaware.

== Programs ==
Season	Short program	Free skating	Exhibition
2013–2014	Cloud Atlas by Piano Sextett	Breath of Life by Audiomachine; Sad Piano by Michael Orteta; Guardians at the Gate by Audiomachine	
2012–2013	Moonlight Sonata by Ludwig van Beethoven	Breath of Life by Audiomachine; Sad Piano by Michael Orteta; Guardians at the Gate by Audiomachine	
2011–2012	Lady Caliph by Ennio Morricone	Send In the Clowns; The Elephant Man; Entry of the Gladiators; Circus Contraception	
2010–2011	The Mask by Randy Edelman	Send In the Clowns; The Elephant Man; Entry of the Gladiators; Circus Contraception	
2009–2010	Moonlight Sonata by Ludwig van Beethoven	Concierto de Aranjuez by Joaquín Rodrigo; Concierto de Aranjuez for piano	Mandolin Rain by Bruce Hornsby
2008–2009	The Matrix by Don Davis; Blues for Klook	Adagio in G minor by Remo Giazotto, Tomaso Albinoni; Ancient Life by Rage	
2007–2008	Moonlight Sonata by Ludwig van Beethoven; Beethoven's Last Night Trans-Siberian Orchestra	Mr. & Mrs. Smith by John Powell	
2006–2007	Moonlight Sonata by Ludwig van Beethoven; Beethoven's Last Night Trans-Siberian Orchestra	Sheherazade by Nikolai Rimsky-Korsakov	
2005–2006	Chronologie Part2; Zoolook No.3 by Jean-Michel Jarre	La Strada; 8½; Il bidone by Nino Rota	Chaplin medley
2004–2005	Tango from Cirque du Soleil by René Dupéré	Art on Ice (from "Strings and Beats") performed by Edvin Marton	
2003–2004	Tango from Cirque du Soleil by René Dupéré	Backdraft by Hans Zimmer	

== Results ==
GP: Grand Prix; JGP: Junior Grand Prix

=== 2003–2014 ===
International
Event	03–04	04–05	05–06	06–07	08–09	09–10	10–11	11–12	12–13	13–14
Olympics			22nd			21st				26th
Worlds		23rd	26th		29th	20th	26th	22nd	20th	30th
Europeans		18th	18th		29th	17th	18th	18th	8th	14th
GP Skate America							12th			
Golden Spin			4th							
Ice Challenge						13th		3rd	11th	2nd
Schäfer Memorial		5th	14th		5th					
Nebelhorn Trophy					10th	5th	13th			
Nepela Memorial						2nd	5th			
Triglav Trophy								2nd		
International: Junior
Junior Worlds		12th	15th							
JGP Bulgaria			5th							
JGP Estonia			5th							
JGP Romania		10th								
JGP Slovakia	22nd									
JGP Ukraine		9th								
Montfort Cup	2nd J	1st J	1st J							
National, domestic, or club events
Austrian Champ.	2nd	1st	1st	2nd	1st	1st	1st	1st	1st	1st
Austrian Junior	1st	1st								

=== 1998–2003 ===
International
Event	01–02	02–03
Copenhagen Trophy		2nd J
Euro. Youth Olympic Festival		11th J
National
Austrian Champ.	4th	1st
Austrian Junior Champ.	2nd	1st
