= Thomas Hlavik =

Austrian figure skater

Personal information
- Born: 1960s

Figure skating career
- Country: Austria
- Skating club: Cottage Engelmann Verein
- Retired: c. 1987

Thomas Hlavik (born in the 1960s) is an Austrian former competitive figure skater. He is a four-time (1982–84, 1986) Austrian national champion. He trained at Cottage Engelmann Verein in Vienna, Austria.

Hlavik placed tenth at the 1981 World Junior Championships in London, England. He appeared at five European Championship, with his best result being 12th place finishes in 1982 (Lyon) and 1984 (Budapest). He also competed at four World Championships.

== Competitive highlights ==
International
Event	78–79	79–80	80–81	81–82	82–83	83–84	84–85	85–86	86–87
Worlds				20th	19th	17th		23rd	
Europeans				12th	13th	12th		15th	13th
Moscow News				-					
International: Junior
Junior Worlds	15th	18th	10th						
National
Austrian Champ.		3rd	3rd	1st	1st	1st		1st	
WD: Withdrew
