= Clemens Jonas =

Austrian figure skater

Personal information
- Born: 12 November 1980 (age 45) Vienna, Austria
- Height: 1.75 m (5 ft 9 in)

Figure skating career
- Country: Austria
- Skating club: Eissport-Klub Engelmann
- Began skating: 1986
- Retired: 2004

Clemens Jonas (born 12 November 1980) is an Austrian former competitive figure skater. A four-time national champion (1999, 2001–02, 2004), he represented Austria at five European and four World Championships.

== Career ==
In November 1998, Jonas qualified for the short program at the World Junior Championships in Zagreb, Croatia but did not advance further. After winning his first national title, he was sent to the European Championships, held in Prague, Czech Republic in January 1999, but was eliminated in the qualifying round.

Jonas sustained a serious injury in a car accident in August 2002 and resumed training in mid-October. In January 2003, he qualified for the free skate at the European Championships in Malmö, Sweden, and finished 22nd overall, his highest ISU Championship placement. Jonas had knee surgery in April 2003, keeping him off the ice for four months.

In the 2003–04 season, Jonas won his fourth national title. He retired from competition following the 2004 World Championships in Dortmund, Germany.

== Programs ==
Season	Short program	Free skating
2003–2004	Lawrence of Arabia by Maurice Jarre	Jesus Christ Superstar by Andrew Lloyd Webber
2002–2003	America by Neil Diamond	Jesus Christ Superstar by Andrew Lloyd Webber
2001–2002	America by Neil Diamond	Fiddler on the Roof by Jerry Bock; Schindler's List by John Williams; Fiddler on the Roof by Jerry Bock
2000–2001	Santorini by Yanni	Fiddler on the Roof by Jerry Bock; Schindler's List by John Williams; Fiddler on the Roof by Jerry Bock

== Competitive highlights ==
International
Event	95–96	96–97	97–98	98–99	99–00	00–01	01–02	02–03	03–04
World Champ.					41st		33rd	35th	33rd
European Champ.				31st		31st	30th	22nd	31st
Golden Spin						22nd	21st		
Schäfer Memorial				9th	11th				
International: Junior
World Junior Champ.				29th					
Gardena			11th J	11th J					
Grand Prize SNP				21st J					
National
Austrian Champ.	4th	2nd	2nd	1st	2nd	1st	1st		1st
Austrian Jr. Champ.				1st					
J = Junior level
