= Hanna Eigel =

Austrian figure skater (born 1939)

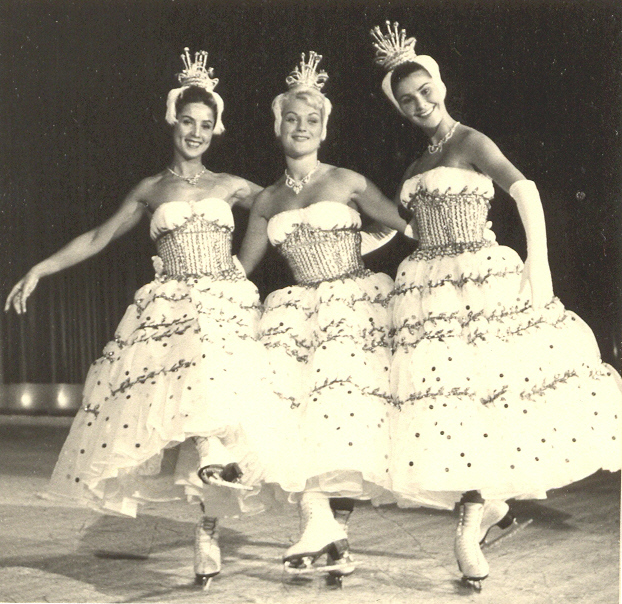
- Eigel skating at the Vienna Ice Revue with Eva Pawlik and Ingrid Wendl

Personal information
- Full name: Hanna Eigel
- Born: 20 May 1939 (age 87) Vienna

Figure skating career
- Country: Austria
- Skating club: Wiener Eislauf-Verein
Medal record
Representing Austria
Ladies' Figure skating
World Championships
Silver medal – second place	1957 Colorado Springs	Ladies' singles
Bronze medal – third place	1955 Vienna	Ladies' singles
European Championships
Gold medal – first place	1957 Vienna	Ladies' singles
Gold medal – first place	1955 Budapest	Ladies' singles

Hanna Eigel (born 20 May 1939 in Vienna) is an Austrian figure skater. She is the 1955 and 1957 European champion and the 1957 World silver medalist. She represented Austria at the 1956 Winter Olympics, where she was placed 5th.

== Competitive highlights ==
International
Event	1954	1955	1956	1957
Winter Olympics			5th	
World Championships	7th	3rd	5th	2nd
European Championships	6th	1st		1st
National
Austrian Championships	2nd	2nd		1st

== External inkss ==
- Evans, Hilary; Gjerde, Arild; Heijmans, Jeroen; Mallon, Bill; et al. "Hanna Eigel". Olympics at Sports-Reference.com. Sports Reference LLC. Archived from the original on April 18, 2020.
- "ISU: World Championships Medalists: Ladies" (PDF). Archived from the original (PDF) on 2009-03-25.
- "ISU: European Championships Medalists: Ladies" (PDF). Archived from the original (PDF) on 2008-12-09.
