= Günter Anderl =

Austrian figure skater

Personal information
- Born: 11 January 1947 Vienna, Austria
- Died: 10 October 2015 (aged 68) Vienna, Austria
- Height: 1.82 m (5 ft 11 1/2 in)

Figure skating career
- Country: Austria
- Skating club: WEV, Wien
- Retired: 1972

Günter Anderl (11 January 1947 – 10 October 2015) was an Austrian figure skater who competed in men's singles. He was the 1968 Winter Universiade bronze medalist, 1969 Nebelhorn Trophy champion, and a three-time Austrian national champion (1969–1971). He competed at two Winter Olympics, in 1968 and 1972.

== Personal life ==
Anderl was born on 11 January 1947 in Vienna, Austria. He died in Vienna on 10 October 2015.

== Career ==
Anderl won the junior gold medal at the inaugural Nebelhorn Trophy, in 1962. In February 1968, he competed at his first Winter Olympics; he ranked 20th in compulsory figures, 23rd in the free skate, and 23rd overall in Grenoble, France. In the same year, he won the bronze medal at the Winter Universiade in Innsbruck, Austria.

Anderl won the senior men's title at the Nebelhorn Trophy in 1969. He was the first winner of the Golden Spin of Zagreb as well as the Zugspitz Pokal and finished on the podium at other international competitions. He received the bronze medal at the 1967 Pre-Olympic Games in Grenoble. He finished eighth at the 1970 and 1971 European Championships.

In February 1972, Anderl competed at the Winter Olympics in Sapporo, Japan; he placed 14th in figures, 16th in free skating, and 15th overall. He ended his ISU-eligible career following the event. In 1979, he finished 6th at the Professional World Championships in Jaca, Spain. He established himself as a coach in Vienna, focusing on young skaters. He also served as Sportunion Wien's regional figure skating expert.

== Results ==
Event	64–65	65–66	66–67	67–68	68–69	69–70	70–71	71–72
Winter Olympics				23rd				15th
World Championships		16th	15th	18th	15th	12th	12th	
European Championships		10th	11th	15th	11th	8th	8th	
Golden Spin of Zagreb			1st	3rd				
Nebelhorn Trophy						1st		
Prague Skate	5th		7th					
Winter Universiade				3rd				
Austrian Championships		3rd	3rd	3rd	1st	1st	1st	2nd
