= Kathrin Freudelsperger =

Austrian figure skater

Personal information
- Born: 8 February 1987 (age 39) Graz, Austria
- Height: 1.70 m (5 ft 7 in)

Figure skating career
- Country: Austria
- Coach: Eva Sonnleitner
- Skating club: Grazer Eislaufverin
- Retired: 2008

Kathrin Freudelsperger (born 8 February 1987 in Graz, Austria) is an Austrian former competitive figure skater. She is the 2006 Merano Cup champion, 2007 International Challenge Cup silver medalist, and 2007 Austrian national champion. She retired from competition in fall 2008. She majored in law at Karl-Franzens University in Graz.

== Programs ==
Season	Short program	Free skating
2006–2007	The Mask of Zorro by James Horner	Rhapsody on a Theme of Paganini by Sergei Rachmaninoff
2004–2005	No hay problema; Donde estas, Yolanda? by Pink Martini	Piano Concerto in A minor by Edvard Grieg; Piano Concerto in A-Minor by Edvard Grieg, arranged by Maxim
2003–2004	Mission: Impossible II by Hans Zimmer	Casablanca by Max Steiner
2000–2001	Salto Musicale by Georg Pommer; Opening; Zylinderhut Schrammel; Bugsy Malon	Black Magic Woman; Samba Pa Ti; Black Magic Woman by Santana

== Competitive highlights ==
JGP: Junior Grand Prix

International
Event	00–01	01–02	02–03	03–04	04–05	05–06	06–07
Worlds							25th
Europeans							25th
Challenge Cup							2nd
Merano Cup							1st
Montfort Cup					3rd		
Nepela Memorial						18th	
Schäfer Memorial							5th
International: Junior
Junior Worlds	41st				17th Q		
JGP Czech Rep.				21st			
JGP Hungary					18th		
JGP Poland						18th	
Gardena			11th J				
Golden Bear		7th J					
Grand Prize SNP		2nd J	7th J				
Mladost Trophy			6th J	4th J			
National
Austrian Champ.	2nd J	4th	3rd J		4th	2nd	1st
J = Junior level; Q = Qualifying round
