= Christian Horvath =

Austrian figure skater

Personal information
- Born: 7 November 1981 (age 44) Feldkirch, Vorarlberg, Austria
- Height: 1.78 m (5 ft 10 in)

Figure skating career
- Country: Austria
- Skating club: Wiener Eislauf Verein
- Began skating: 1985
- Retired: 2001

Christian Horvath (born 7 November 1981) is an Austrian former competitive figure skater. He is a two-time national champion (1998, 2000) and placed 25th at the 2000 European Championships. His father was a soccer player.

== Programs ==
Season	Short program	Free skating
2000–2001	Live at the Acropolis by Yanni	Get Back by John Lennon and Paul McCartney; Nights in White Satin by Justin Hayward; Stairway to Heaven by Jimmy Page, Robert Plant all performed by London Symphony Orchestra

== Competitive highlights ==
JGP: Junior Grand Prix

International
Event	96–97	97–98	98–99	99–00	00–01
European Champ.				25th	
Schäfer Memorial				10th	15th
Nepela Memorial				17th	
International: Junior
World Junior Champ.		30th		33rd	29th
JGP Czech Republic					18th
National
Austrian Champ.	4th	1st		1st	2nd
