= Andrea Kreuzer =

Austrian figure skater (born 1984)

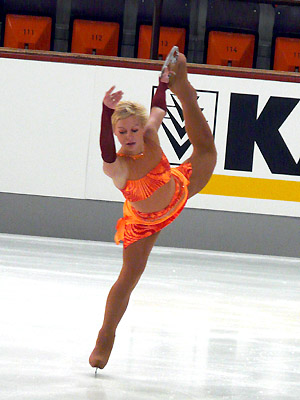
- Kreuzer in 2007.

Personal information
- Born: 3 August 1984 (age 42) Vienna, Austria
- Height: 1.59 m (5 ft 3 in)

Figure skating career
- Country: Austria
- Skating club: Cottage Engelmann Verein
- Began skating: 1989
- Retired: 2011

Andrea Kreuzer (born 3 August 1984) is an Austrian former competitive figure skater. She is the 2006 Austrian national champion and competed in the final segment at two European Championships, finishing 23rd in 2005 (Turin) and 18th in 2006 (Lyon).

Kreuzer started skating at the age of five. She trained at the Cottage Engelmann Verein skating club.

== Programs ==
Season	Short program	Free skating
2008–2009	Nostradamus	Cirque du Soleil; A La Lune; Taiko; A La Lune
2005–2006	X-Files by Hugues Le Bars	Symphony No. 40 by W. A. Mozart; Rock Me Amadeus; Jeannie; Rock Me Amadeus by Rob and Ferdi Bolland
2004–2005	X-Files by Hugues Le Bars	Bohemian Rhapsody by Freddie Mercury The Royal Philharmonic Orchestra
2003–2004	Something for Cat (from Breakfast At Tiffany's) by Henry Mancini	Bohemian Rhapsody by Freddie Mercury The Royal Philharmonic Orchestra

== Competitive highlights ==
International
Event	01–02	02–03	03–04	04–05	05–06	06–07	07–08	08–09	09–10	10–11
Worlds				25th	29th					
Europeans				23rd	18th					
Bavarian Open									3rd	
Crystal Skate		5th								
Golden Spin			18th							
Ice Challenge										10th
Nebelhorn Trophy				14th	15th		20th			
Nepela Memorial								15th	12th	
NRW Trophy									22nd	19th
Schäfer Memorial			10th	9th	12th			18th		
Triglav Trophy								7th		
Universiade					12th					15th
Montfort Cup				2nd						
International: Junior
Junior Worlds			28th							
National
Austrian Champ.	6th J		2nd	3rd	1st			4th	4th	2nd
J = Junior level
