= Belinda Schönberger =

Austrian figure skater (born 1991)

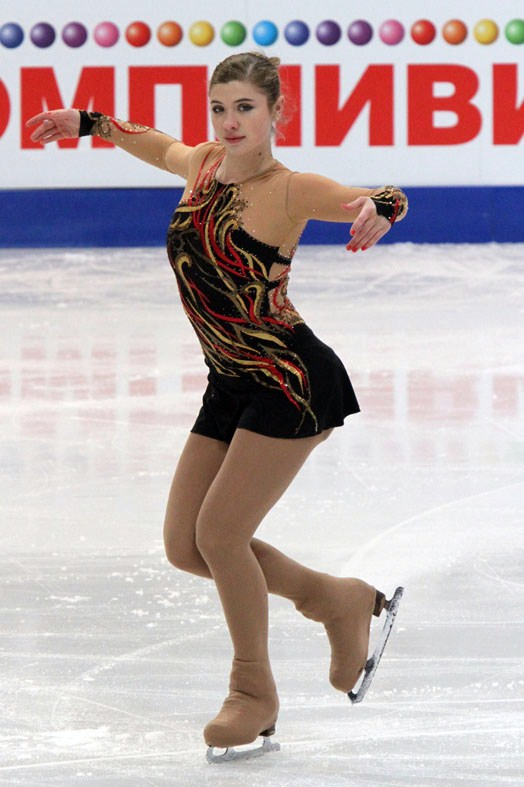
- Schönberger at the 2011 European Championships

Personal information
- Born: 27 August 1991 (age 35) Vienna, Austria
- Height: 1.70 m (5 ft 7 in)

Figure skating career
- Country: Austria
- Coach: Eva Sonnleitner, Nicole Krekl-Klapper
- Skating club: EK Engelmann
- Began skating: 1995

Belinda Schönberger (born 27 August 1991) is an Austrian former competitive figure skater. She is the 2011 Austrian national champion and has won two senior international medals.

== Programs ==
Season	Short program	Free skating
2015–16	It's Oh So Quiet by Björk	Let It Go performed by The Piano Guys
2010–11	Feeling Good by Leslie Bricusse, Anthony Newley	Flamenco
2008–09	Bellydance by Edvin Marton; Dusty June by Oriental Secret; Bellydance by Edvin Marton	Fatal Error; Misconstruction; Ruska by Apocalyptica
2006–07	Vision Tonge Nr. 10 by Albana	Frida by Elliot Goldenthal

== Competitive highlights ==
CS: Challenger Series; JGP: Junior Grand Prix

International
Event	05–06	06–07	07–08	08–09	09–10	10–11	11–12	12–13	14–15	15–16	16–17
Worlds						29th					
Europeans						29th					
CS Nepela Trophy										21st	
Avas Cup										2nd	
Bavarian Open						2nd	7th				
Challenge Cup				14th			13th	8th			
Crystal Skate					6th		10th				
Cup of Nice					6th	12th		19th			
Dragon Trophy								8th			
Golden Bear											11th
Golden Spin								11th			
Ice Challenge					15th	11th		11th			
Lombardia Trophy										17th	
Merano Cup							15th				
Mladost Trophy								5th			
Mont Blanc						6th					
Nepela Memorial							6th				
New Year's Cup								10th			
NRW Trophy							20th	27th		13th	
Printemps							7th		9th		
Santa Claus Cup										9th	
Schäfer Memorial				14th							
Seibt Memorial								10th	20th	18th	
Skate Helena									4th		
Triglav Trophy						9th					
Universiade											18th
International: Junior
JGP Austria			30th			18th					
JGP Belarus				10th	9th						
JGP Croatia	30th										
JGP Germany						19th					
JGP Hungary					22nd						
JGP Mexico				18th							
JGP Romania		15th									
Grand Prize SNP			2nd J								
Montfort Cup	4th J										
National
Austrian Champ.		6th	7th		3rd	1st	2nd	2nd		2nd	6th
J = Junior level
