= Heinz Döpfl =

Austrian pair skater

Personal information
- Other names: Heinz Doepfl
- Born: 30 January 1939
- Died: 11 August 1998 (aged 59)

Figure skating career
- Country: Austria
- Partner: Diana Hinko
- Coach: Hellmut Seibt
- Skating club: WEV

Heinz Döpfl (30 January 1939 – 11 August 1998) was an Austrian pair skater. Competing with Diana Hinko, he became a three-time national champion (1959–1961). The pair finished eighth at the 1960 Winter Olympics and fifth at the 1961 European Championships.

Döpfl also competed in men's singles, winning two national bronze medals.

== Results ==
=== Pairs with Hinko ===
International
Event	1957	1958	1959	1960	1961
Winter Olympics				8th	
World Championships			8th	7th	
European Championships	7th	12th	8th	7th	5th
National
Austrian Championships			1st	1st	1st

=== Men's singles ===
National
Event	1954	1955
Austrian Championships	3rd	3rd
