= Walter Leschetizky =

Austrian former ice dancer

Figure skating career
- Country: Austria
- Partner: Brigitte Scheijbal; Elfriede Rupp
- Skating club: Wiener Eislauf-Verein
- Retired: c. 1974

Walter Leschetizky is an Austrian former ice dancer. During his partnership with Elfriede Rupp, he won two national titles and placed 16th at the 1969 European Championships. Competing with Brigitte Scheijbal, he became a three-time national champion. They competed at two European and two World Championships in the 1970s. The duo belonged to Wiener Eislauf-Verein in Vienna.

Leschetizky has worked as an International Skating Union judge and international referee. As of 2017, he is the president of Wiener Eislauf-Verein.

== Competitive highlights ==
=== With Scheijbal ===
International
Event	1972	1973	1974
World Championships		18th	19th
European Championships	15th		15th
National
Austrian Championships	1st	1st	1st

=== With Rupp ===
International
Event	1969	1970
European Championships	16th	
National
Austrian Championships	1st	1st
