= Mario-Rafael Ionian =

Austrian figure skater (born 1990)

Personal information
- Born: 14 October 1990 (age 35) Feldkirch, Austria
- Height: 1.76 m (5 ft 9 1/2 in)

Figure skating career
- Country: Austria
- Discipline: Men's singles
- Began skating: 1994

Medal record
Austrian Championships
Gold medal – first place	2015 Dorbirn	Singles
Gold medal – first place	2016 Klagenfurt	Singles
Gold medal – first place	2017 Graz	Singles
Silver medal – second place	2009 Linz	Singles
Silver medal – second place	2013 Vienna	Singles
Silver medal – second place	2014 Salzburg	Singles
Bronze medal – third place	2008 St. Pölten	Singles
Bronze medal – third place	2010 Innsbruck	Singles
Bronze medal – third place	2011 St. Pölten	Singles

Mario-Rafael Ionian (born 14 October 1990) is an Austrian former competitive figure skater who competed in men's singles. He is a three-time Austrian national champion and the 2012 Golden Bear of Zagreb champion. He competed at the 2009 World Junior Championships in Sofia, Bulgaria, and at the 2010 World Junior Championships in The Hague, Netherlands, but was eliminated after the short program at both events. He qualified for the free skate at the 2016 European Championships in Bratislava, Slovakia.

His brother, Simon-Gabriel Ionian, is also a competitive skater.

== Programs ==
Season	Short program	Free skating
2016-17	Mr. Bojangles by Jerry Jeff Walker performed by Robbie Williams; Mr. Pin Stripe Suit by Big Bad Voodoo Daddy	The Mask (soundtrack)
2015–16	Mr. Bojangles by Jerry Jeff Walker performed by Robbie Williams; Mr. Pin Stripe Suit by Big Bad Voodoo Daddy	Vabanque (soundtrack)
2009–10	Brazil by Maxime Rodriguez	Gangs of New York by various artists
2008–09	L'Enfant Pur by Maxime Rodriguez	Gangs of New York by various artists

== Competitive highlights ==
CS: Challenger Series; JGP: Junior Grand Prix

International
Event	07–08	08–09	09–10	10–11	11–12	12–13	13–14	14–15	15–16	16–17
Europeans									23rd	36th
CS Golden Spin								22nd		
CS Ice Challenge								10th	12th	
CS Lombardia								WD		
Bavarian Open						22nd				
Crystal Skate		8th	9th	6th	8th					
Cup of Nice				19th		24th		14th		
Golden Bear						1st				
Ice Challenge			21st	13th	18th	18th	13th			
Merano Cup			16th							16th
New Year's Cup						7th				
Printemps					10th	7th				
Santa Claus Cup									2nd	13th
Seibt Memorial						7th				
Triglav Trophy			5th	12th			6th			
Universiade					16th		25th	19th		35th
International: Junior
Junior Worlds		35th	28th							
JGP Austria	20th									
JGP Bulgaria	19th									
JGP Czech Rep.		19th								
JGP Germany			19th							
JGP Poland			21st							
JGP U.K.		22nd								
National
Austrian Champ.	3rd	2nd	3rd	3rd	4th	2nd	2nd	1st	1st	1st
Austrian Jr. Champ.		1st	1st							
WD = Withdrew
