= Manuel Koll =

Austrian figure skater

Personal information
- Born: 14 September 1987 (age 39) Vöcklabruck, Austria
- Height: 1.80 m (5 ft 11 in)

Figure skating career
- Country: Austria
- Discipline: Men's singles
- Began skating: 1992

Medal record
Austrian Championships
Gold medal – first place	2007 Vienna	Singles
Gold medal – first place	2008 St. Pölten	Singles
Gold medal – first place	2018 Vienna	Singles
Silver medal – second place	2010 Innsbruck	Singles
Silver medal – second place	2011 St. Pölten	Singles
Silver medal – second place	2012 Graz	Singles
Silver medal – second place	2015 Dornbirn	Singles
Silver medal – second place	2016 Innsbruck	Singles
Silver medal – second place	2017 Graz	Singles
Bronze medal – third place	2005 Innsbruck	Singles

Manuel Koll (born 14 September 1987) is an Austrian former competitive figure skater. He is a three-time (2007, 2008, and 2018) Austrian national champion and reached the free skate at two ISU Championships — the 2007 World Junior Championships in Oberstdorf and the 2008 European Championships in Zagreb. He was coached by his mother, Ursula Koll, who competed internationally as a pair skater.

== Programs ==
Season	Short program	Free skating
2014–2015	The Third Man by Anton Karas	Man With a Harmonica; For a Few Dollars More; Once Upon a Time in the West by Ennio Morricone; Knights of Cydonia by Muse
2013–2014	The Third Man by Anton Karas	Thriller; Earth Song; Ghost by Michael Jackson
2007–2008	Tangology by Gigi D'Agostino	Brotherhood of the Wolf by Joseph LoDuca; Das Blut der Templer by Siggi Mueller, Egon Riedel

== Competitive highlights ==
CS: Challenger Series; JGP: Junior Grand Prix

International
Event	01–02	02–03	03–04	04–05	05–06	06–07	07–08	08–09	09–10	10–11	11–12	12–13	13–14	14–15	15–16	16–17	17–18
Worlds							37th										
Europeans						27th	23rd						33rd	30th			
CS Ice Challenge														11th	15th		
CS Nepela Trophy															13th		
Challenge Cup								15th									
Cup of Nice										15th					18th		
DS Cup													6th				
Finlandia Trophy										12th							
Golden Spin							17th	19th									
Ice Challenge									24th	8th		15th	12th				
Lombardia													13th				
Merano Cup										11th		12th					
Nepela Memorial								10th	17th	9th			16th				
Nordics										6th							
NRW Trophy														15th	16th		
Printemps												9th					
Santa Claus Cup														3rd	7th		
Schäfer Memorial								15th									
Seibt Memorial														10th			
Triglav Trophy										8th	7th	9th					
Universiade								24th					29th	23rd			
International: Junior
Junior Worlds						24th											
JGP Hungary						11th											
JGP Norway						18th											
Copenhagen				2nd													
Dragon Trophy					6th												
Golden Bear			5th														
Montfort Cup		1st															
National
Austrian Championships	3rd J	5th J	3rd J	3rd		1st	1st		2nd	2nd	2nd		4th	2nd	2nd	2nd	1st
Belgian Championships									1st (Note: Guest skater)								
