= Sonja Stanek =

Austrian figure skater

Figure skating career
- Country: Austria
- Retired: c. 1983

Sonja Stanek is an Austrian former competitive figure skater. She is the 1978 Blue Swords silver medalist, 1979 Karl Schäfer Memorial silver medalist, and 1983 Austrian national champion. She competed at multiple ISU Championships, finishing in the top ten at the 1983 European Championships in Dortmund. Her best world result, 14th, came at the 1983 World Championships in Helsinki.

== Competitive highlights ==
International
Event	73–74	74–75	75–76	76–77	77–78	78–79	79–80	80–81	81–82	82–83
World Champ.							15th	20th	18th	14th
European Champ.		23rd				18th			15th	9th
Blue Swords		10th		5th		2nd	4th	5th		
NHK Trophy							14th	6th	9th	
Prague Skate	9th									
Schäfer Memorial							2nd			
Grand Prize SNP	1st J									
National
Austrian Champ.		2nd		2nd	2nd	2nd	2nd	3rd	2nd	1st
J = Junior level
