= Karin Brandstätter =

Austrian figure skater

Personal information
- Born: October 6, 1983 (age 43) Graz, Austria
- Height: 1.64 m (5 ft 5 in)

Figure skating career
- Country: Austria
- Skating club: Grazer Eislaufverein
- Retired: 2007

Karin Brandstätter (born October 6, 1983, in Graz) is an Austrian former competitive figure skater. She is the 2005 Austrian national champion. She placed 35th at the 2005 European Championships.

== Programs ==
Season	Short program	Free skating
2004–2005	Vision by Albane di Re; Music by Bond	Das Testament; Die Prophezeiung by E. Nomine

== Competitive highlights ==
JGP: Junior Grand Prix

International
Event	97–98	98–99	99–00	00–01	01–02	02–03	03–04	04–05	06–07
Europeans								35th	
Nepela Memorial								10th	
Universiade									22nd
International: Junior
JGP Bulgaria		21st			15th				
JGP Slovakia	11th								
Golden Bear	2nd J		10th J						
Mladost Trophy	1st J								
National
Austrian Champ.				4th		6th	5th	1st	5th
J: Junior level
