= Dmitri Matsjuk =

Figure skater

Dmytro Matsyuk
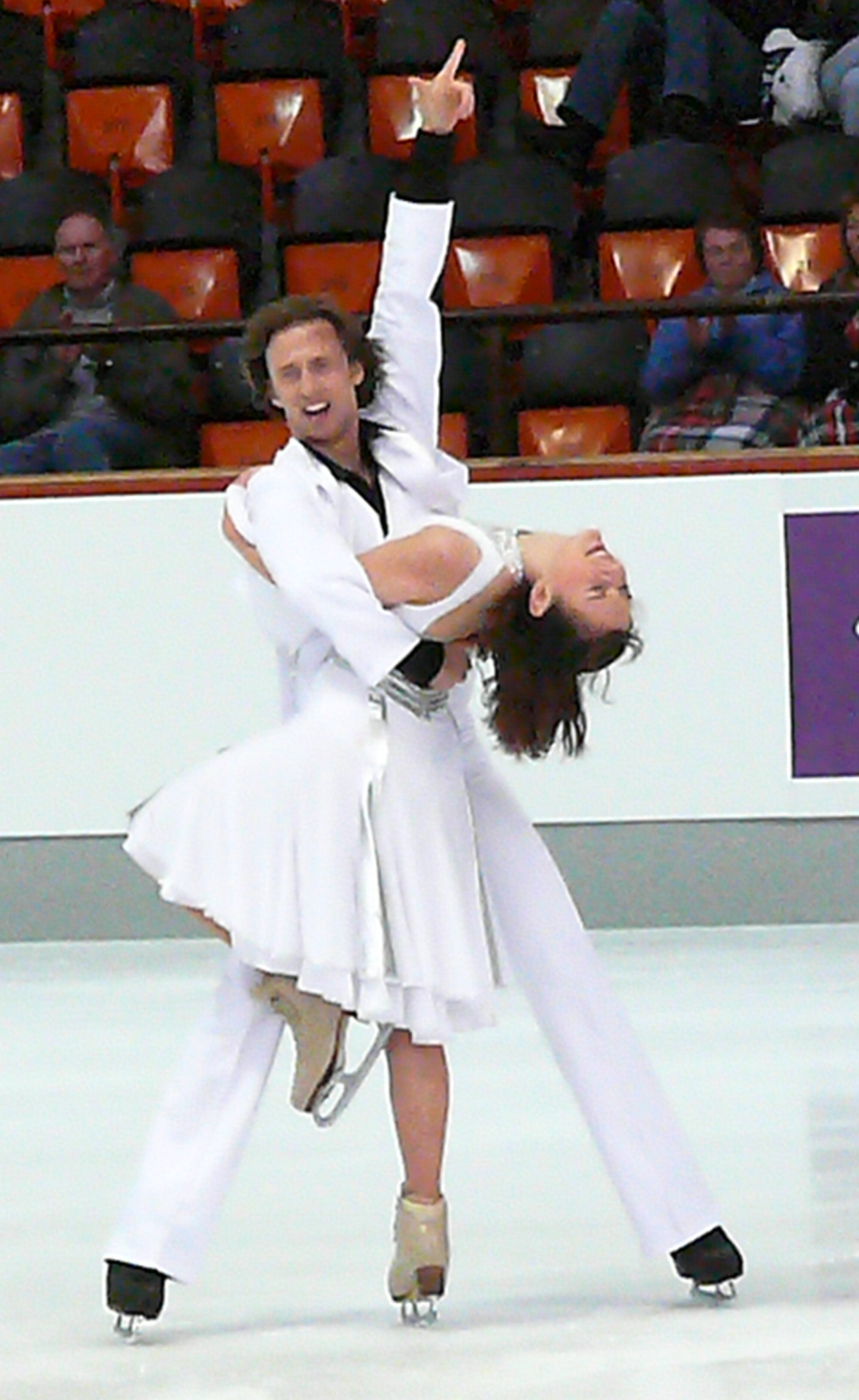
- Silná and Matsyuk in 2007.

Personal information
- Other names: Dmitri Matsjuk
- Born: 4 October 1981 (age 45) Odessa, Ukrainian SSR, Soviet Union
- Home town: Vienna
- Height: 1.82 m (5 ft 11 1/2 in)

Figure skating career
- Country: Austria
- Coach: Jana Hubler, Oliver Pekar
- Skating club: Cottage Engelmann Club Vienna

Dmytro Matsyuk or Dmitri Matsjuk (Ukrainian: Дмитро Мацюк; born 4 October 1981) is a Ukrainian-born ice dancer who competes for Austria. With Barbora Silna and Kira Geil, he became a five-time Austrian national champion and qualified to the free dance at six ISU Championships.

== Career ==
Matsyuk began learning to skate in 1985. Early in his career, he competed with Ekaterina Madej and Barbara Herzog.

In 2005, he teamed up with Czech-born skater Barbora Silná to compete on the senior level for Austria. The two won four Austrian national titles from 2006 to 2009 and the silver medal at the 2007 Ondrej Nepela Memorial. They qualified to the free dance at four ISU Championships – 2007 Europeans in Warsaw, Poland; 2008 Europeans in Zagreb, Croatia; 2008 Worlds in Gothenburg, Sweden; and 2009 Europeans in Helsinki, Finland. Their best result, 15th, came in Helsinki. They trained under Jana Hübler at Cottage Engelmann Club in Vienna and in Lyon.

Matsyuk competed with Kira Geil from 2009 to 2010. In December 2016, he competed at the Austrian Championships with Regina Yankovska. Presently, he serves as a coach for ice skating, figure skating, and ice dancing, catering to individuals of all ages in Vienna, Austria.

== Programs ==
=== With Geil ===
Season	Original dance	Free dance
2009–10	Austrian folk dance: Kuckucks Jodler	Music by John Miles

=== With Silná ===
Season	Original dance	Free dance
2008–09	Swing: Sing, Sing, Sing by Louis Prima	I'd Do Anything for Love by Jim Steinman performed by Meat Loaf
2007–08	Austrian folk dance: Kuckucks Jodler Polka	Saturday Night Fever by the Bee Gees, Adam Garcia
2006–07	Maria De Buenos Aires by Astor Piazzolla	Saturday Night Fever by the Bee Gees, Adam Garcia

== Competitive highlights ==
GP: Grand Prix

=== With Geil ===
International
Event	2009–10
World Championships	19th
European Championships	17th
Nebelhorn Trophy	13th
Finlandia Trophy	9th
Ice Challenge	12th
Ondrej Nepela Memorial	8th
Mont Blanc Trophy	7th
National
Austrian Championships	1st

=== With Silná ===
International
Event	05–06	06–07	07–08	08–09
World Champ.		25th	21st	
Europeans		19th	16th	15th
GP Trophée Bompard			8th	
Nebelhorn Trophy	13th	10th	8th	
Nepela Memorial			2nd	
Schäfer Memorial	14th	5th		WD
National
Austrian Champ.	1st	1st	1st	1st
WD = Withdrew
