= Denise Kögl =

Austrian figure skater

Denise Koegl
Personal information
- Born: August 3, 1988 (age 38) Graz, Austria
- Height: 1.62 m (5 ft 4 in)

Figure skating career
- Country: Austria
- Coach: Elli Koegl-Staerck
- Skating club: ESC Graz

Denise Koegl (born August 3, 1988) is an Austrian former competitive figure skater. She is the 2008 Austrian national champion, the 2007 Austrian national silver medalist, and the junior national champion in 2002 and 2003.

== Personal life ==
Koegl was born on August 3, 1988, in Graz, Austria. She received a coaching diploma from the Bundessport Akademie Vienna. In July 2013, she graduated from Karl-Franzens University in Graz with a degree in media communications followed by a master's degree in 2016. She also studied English and psychology and philosophy. She graduated with the degree Magister philosophiae (Mag.phil.).

== Career ==
Koegl represented Eis Sport Club Graz. She was briefly coached by her mother, a former Austrian junior champion in ladies' singles, and then by her grandmother, Elli Koegl-Staerck, who was 6th in pair skating at the 1950 World Championships. She also won the Euro Cup in her earlier years of skating.

Koegl sustained an ankle injury in August 2008 and underwent a complicated surgery. She decided to officially end her career in February 2010 after winning her 7th Styrian Championship title.

Koegl appeared at the 71. Hahnenkammrennen in Kitzbuehel, where she worked for a Red Bull magazine.

== Programs ==
Season	Short program	Free skating
2006–2008	Chicago by John Kander and Fred Ebb	Bohemian Rhapsody performed by Maksim Mrvica

== Competitive highlights ==
JGP: Junior Grand Prix

International
Event	02–03	03–04	04–05	05–06	06–07	07–08	08–09
Worlds						46th	
Europeans						33rd	
Golden Spin						20th	
Nepela Memorial							16th
Universiade							24th
International: Junior
JGP Croatia						11th	
JGP Germany	16th		25th			WD	
JGP Hungary					17th		
JGP Italy	17th						
JGP Poland		20th					
National
Austrian Champ.	5th	4th		4th	2nd	1st	3rd
WD = Withdrew
