= Jubilee Jenna Mandl =

Austrian figure skater

Jubilee Jenna Mandl (born 2 February in Vienna) is an Austrian former figure skater who competed in ladies singles.

She won the gold medal at the Austrian Figure Skating Championships in 1998 and 1999, was five times the European Criterium Champion in the 1990s, Top 3 in Worlds, Top 10 in the Olympics, and was a member of the Austrian Olympic figure skating team. She is also known for her creative spin routines and elevating the Biellmann spin as a one-handed pirouette. She was ranked amongst world's top 10 sexiest athletes in 2005.

She has a multicultural background; her mother from Spanish and Philippine descent and her father with a French-Austrian background. She also has Norwegian and Czech heritage.
