= Christian Rauchbauer =

Austrian figure skater

Personal information
- Born: 6 September 1984 (age 42) Eisenstadt, Austria
- Height: 1.80 m (5 ft 11 in)

Figure skating career
- Country: Austria
- Discipline: Men's singles
- Began skating: 1996

Medal record
Austrian Championships
Silver medal – second place	2002	Singles
Silver medal – second place	2003 Dornbirn	Singles
Silver medal – second place	2005 Innsbruck	Singles
Silver medal – second place	2008 St. Pölten	Singles
Bronze medal – third place	2001	Singles
Bronze medal – third place	2004 Vienna	Singles
Bronze medal – third place	2007 Vienna	Singles

Christian Rauchbauer (born 6 September 1984) is an Austrian former competitive figure skater. He is the 2007 NRW Trophy bronze medalist, the 2005 Copenhagen Trophy champion, and a seven-time national medalist (four silver, three bronze). At the 2007 World Championships in Tokyo, where he placed 29th, he became the first Austrian skater to perform a quad toe loop jump in competition.

== Programs ==
Season	Short program	Free skating
2006–07	Concierto de Aranjuez (Guitar version) by Joaquín Rodrigo	Xotica by René Dupéré; Pirates of the Caribbean: Dead Man's Chest by Hans Zimmer
2002–03	The Godfather by Nino Rota	The Peacemaker by Hans Zimmer

== Competitive highlights ==
JGP: Junior Grand Prix

International
Event	99–00	00–01	01–02	02–03	03–04	04–05	05–06	06–07	07–08
Worlds								29th	
Copenhagen						1st			
Crystal Skate					4th				
Cup of Nice						8th		11th	16th
Nebelhorn Trophy						18th			
Nepela Memorial						6th			
NRW Trophy									3rd
Schäfer Memorial						20th			
Universiade						20th		17th	
International: Junior
Junior Worlds					32nd				
JGP Bulgaria			14th						
JGP Czech Rep.					18th				
JGP Italy				21st					
JGP Poland					WD				
JGP Slovakia				15th					
JGP Sweden			16th						
Copenhagen					6th J.				
National
Austrian Champ.	4th	3rd	2nd	2nd	3rd	2nd		3rd	2nd
J. = Junior level; WD = Withdrew
