= Barbara Herzog =

Austrian former ice dancer (born 1985)

Barbara Herzog (born 28 December 1985, in Vienna) is an Austrian former ice dancer. Skating with David Vincour, she won two Austrian national junior titles (2000–2001). She then teamed with Dmytro Matsyuk and won three senior national titles (2002–2004).

== Programs ==
=== With Matsyuk ===
Season	Original dance	Free dance
2003–2004	Never no More by Patsy Cline; The Snake by Oscar Brown Jr.	Hair by MacDermot
2002–2003	March; Waltz: Abend Sterne; Galop: Jagd Galop by Joseph Lanner	Let It Be by The Beatles

=== With Vincour ===
Season	Original dance	Free dance
2000–2001	March: March of the Mods performed by Joe Loss Orchestra; Foxtrot: A Doodlin Song by Peggy Lee; Quickstep: Le Jazz Hot!	The Last of the Mohicans by Trevor Jones

== Competitive highlights ==
JGP: Junior Grand Prix

=== With Matsyuk ===
International
Event	2001–02	2002–03	2003–04
World Champ.			27th
European Champ.			17th
Golden Spin			5th
Schäfer Memorial			7th
International: Junior
World Junior Champ.		16th	
JGP Italy		15th	
Pavel Roman Memorial		2nd J	
National
Austrian Champ.	1st	1st	1st
J = Junior level

=== With Vincour ===
International
Event	1999–2000	2000–2001
World Junior Championships	28th	22nd
JGP Czech Republic		12th
JGP Norway		13th
Grand Prize SNP	6th J	
National
Austrian Championships	1st J	1st J
J = Junior level
