= Parthena Sarafidis =

Austrian figure skater

Figure skating career
- Country: Austria
- Retired: c. 1986

Parthena Sarafidis is an Austrian former competitive figure skater. She is the 1983 World Junior bronze medalist and the 1984 Austrian national champion. She placed 11th at the 1984 European Championships in Budapest and 16th at the 1984 World Championships in Ottawa.

== Competitive highlights ==
International
Event	81–82	82–83	83–84	84–85	85–86
World Champ.	24th		16th		
European Champ.	16th	12th	11th		
Prize of Moscow News					9th
International: Junior
World Junior Champ.	8th	3rd			
National
Austrian Champ.	3rd	2nd	1st	3rd	1st
