= Hellmut May =

Austrian figure skater (1921–2011)

Personal information
- Full name: Hellmuth Rolf Richard Johannes May
- Born: June 9, 1921 Vienna, Austria
- Died: November 11, 2011 (aged 90) Richmond, British Columbia, Canada

Figure skating career
- Country: Austria

Achievements and titles
- Olympic finals: 1936 Winter Olympics; 1948 Winter Olympics

Hellmut May (June 9, 1921 – November 11, 2011) was a figure skater who represented Austria at the Winter Olympics in 1936 and 1948.

== Life and career ==
Hellmut May was 14 years old when he competed at the 1936 Winter Olympics in Garmisch-Partenkirchen, Germany, finishing 14th. In May 1941, he was drafted into the army for World War II and later spent time in American and British POW camps. His family's apartment was damaged by a bomb but his mother retrieved his skates. May finished eighth at the 1948 Winter Olympics in St. Moritz, Switzerland.

May emigrated to Canada in 1954. In 1955, he became the head coach at the Kerrisdale Figure Skating Club in Vancouver, British Columbia. He was the first coach of Karen Magnussen.

May was inducted into the Skate Canada Hall of Fame in 2010 and died in November 2011 in Richmond, British Columbia. He was married to Andrea May.

== Results ==
International
Event	1936	1937	1938	1939	1940	1941	1946	1947	1948
Winter Olympics	14th								8th
World Championships									8th
European Championships				9th					
National
Austrian Championships	3rd	3rd					2nd		2nd
Ostmark Championships					2nd	2nd			
