= Florian Tuma =

Austrian figure skater

Personal information
- Born: 14 July 1977 (age 49) Vienna, Austria
- Height: 1.81 m (5 ft 11 1/2 in)

Figure skating career
- Country: Austria
- Coach: Sonja Harand
- Skating club: Wiener Eislauf Verein
- Began skating: 1983
- Retired: 1997

Florian Tuma (born 14 July 1977 in Vienna) is an Austrian former competitive figure skater. He is a five-time Austrian national champion (1993–1997) and competed in the final segment at six ISU Championships, including the 1995 World Championships in Birmingham, England, and 1996 European Championships in Sofia, Bulgaria.

== Programs ==
Season	Short program	Free skating
1996–1997		First Knight by Jerry Goldsmith; Les Misérables by Claude-Michel Schönberg performed by the Royal Philharmonic Orchestra

== Results ==
International
Event	91–92	92–93	93–94	94–95	95–96	96–97
World Champ.		35th		24th	WD	41st
European Champ.		27th	33rd		20th	WD
Finlandia Trophy					9th	
Nepela Memorial				4th		8th
Penta Cup		8th				
Schäfer Memorial			12th			12th
Sofia Cup			5th			
International: Junior
World Junior Champ.			20th	22nd	15th	16th
Blue Swords				15th J	15th J	
EYOF		9th J		4th J		
Grand Prize SNP		12th J				3rd J
Ukrainian Souvenir		13th J				
National
Austrian Champ.	7th	1st	1st	1st	1st	1st
J = Junior level; WD = Withdrew
