= Marcin Staniek =

Polish footballer

Personal information
- Full name: Marcin Staniek
- Date of birth: 28 July 1980 (age 46)
- Place of birth: Wodzisław Śląski, Poland
- Height: 1.90 m (6 ft 3 in)
- Position: Defender

Senior career*
Years	Team	Apps	(Gls)
- Przyszłość Rogów
1999–2002	Odra Wodzisław	8	(0)
2003	Koszarawa Żywiec		
2003–2004	Carbo Gliwice		
2004–2005	Przyszłość Rogów		
2005–2006	SV Höxter		
2007	Walka Makoszowy		
2008	Pelikan Łowicz	14	(1)
2008–2009	GKS Jastrzębie	30	(1)
2010	Flota Świnoujście	7	(1)
2011	Kolejarz Stróże	14	(1)
2011–2012	Olimpia Elbląg	16	(0)
2012–2014	Olimpia Grudziądz	57	(2)
- * Club domestic league appearances and goals

Marcin Staniek (born 28 July 1980) is a Polish former professional footballer who played as a defender.

== Career ==
=== Club ===
In February 2011, he moved to Kolejarz Stróże on a half year deal.

In July 2011, joined Olimpia Elbląg on a one-year contract.
