= Inge Solar =

Austrian figure skater

Personal information
- Nationality: Austrian
- Born: 21 December 1926
- Died: 27 November 2017 (aged 90)

Sport
- Sport: Figure skating

Inge Solar (21 December 1926 – 27 November 2017) was an Austrian figure skater. She competed in the ladies' singles event at the 1948 Winter Olympics.
