= Angelika Führing =

Austrian ice dancer (born 1976)

Angelika Führing (born 4 October 1976 in Vienna) is a former competitive Austrian ice dancer. With Peter Wilczek, she won the gold medal at the Austrian National Figure Skating Championships in 1993 and 1994. She later teamed with partner Bruno Ellinger and won three more national titles from 1997 to 1999.
