= Emil Ratzenhofer =

Austrian pair skater

Emil Ratzenhofer (2 August 1914 – 17 December 2005) was an Austrian pair skater. Competing with his sister Herta Ratzenhofer, he won five gold medals at the Austrian Figure Skating Championships. The pair won the bronze medal at the European Figure Skating Championships in 1948 and 1949. They finished ninth at the 1948 Winter Olympics.

== Results ==
=== Men's singles ===
Event	1935	1936	1937	1938	1939
World Championships			9th		
European Championships	9th				7th
Austrian Championships				3rd	3rd
Czechoslovak Championships		1st			

=== Pairs with Herta Ratzenhofer ===
Event	1943	1944	1945	1946	1947	1948	1949	1950
Winter Olympics						9th		
World Championships						11th	5th	
European Championships						3rd	3rd	
German Championships		1st						
Austrian Championships	1st			1st	1st	1st	1st	3rd
