= Ingrid Ostler =

Austrian figure skater

Personal information
- Nationality: Austrian
- Born: 8 April 1948 (age 77) Vienna, Austria

Sport
- Sport: Figure skating

Ingrid Ostler (born 8 April 1948) is an Austrian figure skater. She competed in the ladies' singles event at the 1964 Winter Olympics.
