= Herta Ratzenhofer =

Austrian pair skater

Personal information
- Born: 27 June 1921 Vienna, Austria
- Died: 6 January 2010 (aged 88) Austria

Sport
- Country: (Austria)
- Sport: Figure Skater
- Events: Austrian Figure Skating Championships; European Figure Skating Championships; German Figure Skating Championships; World Figure Skating Championships; 1948 Winter Olympics

Herta Ratzenhofer (27 June 1921 – 6 January 2010) was an Austrian pair skater. Competing with her brother Emil Ratzenhofer, she won five gold medals at the Austrian Figure Skating Championships. The pair won the bronze medal at the European Figure Skating Championships in 1948 and 1949, and they finished ninth at the 1948 Winter Olympics.

Ratzenhofer died in Austria on 6 January 2010, at the age of 88.

== Results ==
Pairs with Ratzenhofer

International
| Event | 1943 | 1944 | 1945 | 1946 | 1947 | 1948 | 1949 | 1950 |
|---|---|---|---|---|---|---|---|---|
| Winter Olympics | | | | | | 9th | | |
| World Championships | | | | | | 11th | 5th | |
| European Championships | | | | | | 3rd | 3rd | |
National
| German Championships | | 1st | | | | | | |
| Austrian Championships | 1st | | | 1st | 1st | 1st | 1st | 3rd |
