= Gerda Staniek =

Austrian javelin thrower (1925–1985)

Personal information
- Full name: Gerda Adele Schilling-Staniek
- Nationality: Austrian
- Born: 8 February 1925
- Died: January 1985 (aged 59)

Sport
- Sport: Athletics
- Event: Javelin throw

Gerda Adele Schilling-Staniek (8 February 1925 – January 1985) was an Austrian athlete. She competed in the women's javelin throw at the 1948 Summer Olympics and the 1952 Summer Olympics. She also competed in ice dance with her partner Fritz Staniek, whom she married, from 1945 until his death in October 1950.
