= 1911 World Figure Skating Championships =

Annual figure skating competition held in 1911

- Type: ISU Championship
- Season: 1911
- Location: Berlin, German Empire (men) (Austrian Empire) Vienna, Austria-Hungary (ladies and pairs)

Champions
- Men's singles: (Sweden) Ulrich Salchow
- Ladies' singles: (Kingdom of Hungary) Lily Kronberger
- Pairs: (German Empire) Ludowika Eilers / Walter Jakobsson
- Previous: 1910 World Championships
- Next: 1912 World Championships

The World Figure Skating Championships is an annual figure skating competition sanctioned by the International Skating Union in which figure skaters compete for the title of World Champion.

Men's competitions took place from February 2 to 3 in Berlin, German Empire. Ladies' competition took place on January 22 in Vienna, Austria-Hungary. There were only three competitors. Pairs' competition took place on January 22 also in Vienna, Austria-Hungary. Only one pair competed. The judges for the ladies' and the pairs' competition were the same.

== Results ==
=== Men ===
Rank	Name	Age	CF		FS		Total	Points	Places
1	(Sweden) Ulrich Salchow	33	1	1540	1	1027	2567	366.71	14
2	(German Empire) Werner Rittberger	19	3	1485	2	1020.5	2505.5	357.86	17
3	(Austrian Empire) Fritz Kachler	23	2	1516	4	968.5	2484.5	354.93	20
4	(Kingdom of Hungary) Andor Szende	24	4	1389.5	3	994.5	2384	340.57	26
5	(Sweden) Richard Johansson	28	5	1387.5	5	965.5	2353	336.14	27
6	(Norway) Martin Stixrud	34	6		6				43
7	(Sweden) Dunbar Poole	34	7	1216	7	832	2048	292.57	47

Judges:

- (German Empire) Eugen Dreyer
- (Kingdom of Hungary) Jenő Minich
- (Austrian Empire) L. Panek
- (German Empire) Max Rendschmidt
- (Austrian Empire) F. Schwarz
- (German Empire) M. Strasilla
- (Sweden) Ivar Westengren

=== Ladies ===
Rank	Name	Points	Places
1	(Kingdom of Hungary) Lily Kronberger	286.71	7
2	(Kingdom of Hungary) Zsófia Méray-Horváth	260.86	14
3	(German Empire) Ludowika Eilers		21

Judges:

- (Austrian Empire) G. Feix
- (Austrian Empire) Josef Fellner
- (German Empire) Martin Gordan
- (Austrian Empire) Walter Müller
- (Austrian Empire) F. Schwarz
- (Austrian Empire) Mrs. Schwarz
- (Kingdom of Hungary) Géza Zsigmondy

=== Pairs ===
The only competitor were the pair of the 27 years old Ludowika Eilers and the 29 years old Walter Jakobsson won the gold medal. Despite they came from different country, they represented the German Empire. After the competition they married and represented the Grand Duchy of Finland. The same judges decided about their points as in the Ladies' competition.
