= Lily Kronberger =

Hungarian figure skater

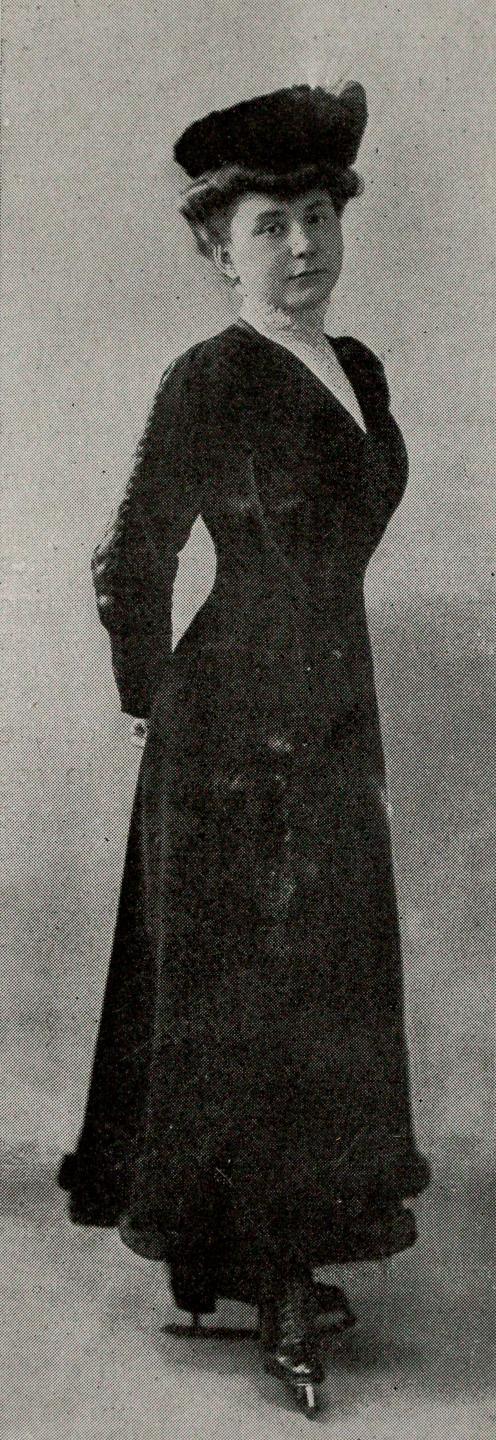
- Lily Kronberger

Personal information
- Born: 12 November 1890
- Died: 21 May 1974 (aged 83)

Figure skating career
- Country: Hungary
- Retired: 1911
Medal record
Representing Hungary
Ladies' Figure skating
World Championships
Gold medal – first place	1911 Vienna	Ladies' singles
Gold medal – first place	1910 Davos	Ladies' singles
Gold medal – first place	1909 Budapest	Ladies' singles
Gold medal – first place	1908 Troppau	Ladies' singles
Bronze medal – third place	1907 Vienna	Ladies' singles
Bronze medal – third place	1906 Davos	Ladies' singles

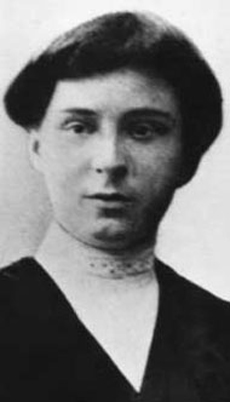
Lily Kronberger

Lily Kronberger (12 November 1890 – 21 May 1974), also spelled Lili Kronberger, was a Hungarian figure skater competitive during the early years of modern figure skating. She was Hungary’s first World Champion.

== Early life ==
Kronberger was born in Budapest in 1890, the youngest child and only daughter of Miksa Kronberger (1857–1902), a lumber merchant, and Janka Kreisler (1867–1927).

== Career ==
Kronberger won a World bronze medal in 1906, at the first official World Championships to include a ladies' event.

She won bronze again in 1907 and four gold medals from 1908 to 1911." She was the first athlete to win a world championship gold for Hungary.

At the 1911 championship in Vienna, she caused a stir by bringing a military band along to play during her free skating program, which included a "clear interpretation" of the music she used, even though the use of music during international figure skating competitions was rare at the time. Kronberger worked with Zoltán Kodály to develop a method of notation for placing skating steps with music and anticipated that music would someday be written for skating as it was for ballets. Ann and Gregory Kelley, writing for Skating magazine, credited her with "an integral role in fusing music to skating".

In 1911, she married Imre Szent-Györgyi and retired from competition, handing the baton over to Opika Méray Horváth. She and her husband worked to develop skating in Hungary, although there was often a lack of ice.

She died in Budapest in 1974, at the age of 83.

== Halls of Fame ==
Kronberger, who was Jewish, was inducted into the International Jewish Sports Hall of Fame in 1983.

She was inducted into the World Figure Skating Hall of Fame in 1997.

== Results ==
Event	1904	1906	1907	1908	1909	1910	1911
World Championships		3rd	3rd	1st	1st	1st	1st
Hungarian Championships*	2nd			1st	1st	1st	

*Co-ed competition from 1900–1922

== See also ==
- List of select Jewish figure skaters
