= Ludowika Jakobsson =

Finnish figure skater (1884–1968)

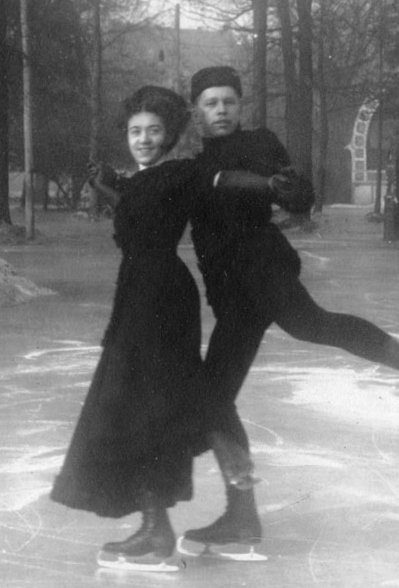
- Ludowika and Walter Jakobsson

Personal information
- Born: 25 July 1884 Potsdam, German Empire
- Died: 1 November 1968 (aged 84) Helsinki, Finland

Figure skating career
- Country: German Empire; Finland
- Retired: 1928
Medal record
Representing German Empire
Ladies' Figure skating
World Championships
Bronze medal – third place	1911 Vienna	Ladies' singles
Pairs Figure skating
World Championships
Gold medal – first place	1911 Vienna	Pairs
Silver medal – second place	1910 Berlin	Pairs
Representing Finland
Pairs Figure skating
Olympic Games
Silver medal – second place	1924 Chamonix	Pairs
Gold medal – first place	1920 Antwerp	Pairs
World Championships
Gold medal – first place	1923 Oslo	Pairs
Silver medal – second place	1922 Davos	Pairs
Gold medal – first place	1914 St. Moritz	Pairs
Silver medal – second place	1913 Stockholm	Pairs
Silver medal – second place	1912 Manchester	Pairs

Ludovika Antje Margareta Jakobsson-Eilers (née Eilers, 25 July 1884 – 1 November 1968) was a German-Finnish figure skater. Competing in pair skating with her husband Walter Jakobsson, she won the gold medal at the 1920 Summer Olympics, where she was the only German-born athlete, and became the oldest female figure skating Olympic champion. The pair also earned three world titles, in 1911, 1914 and 1923, and finished second and fifth at the 1924 and 1928 Olympics, respectively. Eilers also had some success in single skating, winning a bronze medal at the 1911 World Championships.

== Early years ==
Eilers met Jakobsson in 1907 while he was studying engineering in Berlin. They began competing together in 1910 and married in 1911; hence the International Skating Union counts their 1910–1911 medals as half-German, half-Finnish, and those after 1911 as Finnish. The couple lived in Berlin until 1916, when they moved to Helsinki. There Walter got a job of technical director with Konecranes, a leading manufacturer of cranes, while Ludovika starred in a few Finnish silent films.

== Results in ladies' singles ==
Event	1911	1912	1917
World Championships	3rd	7th	
Finnish Championships			1st

== Results in pairs with Walter Jakobsson ==
Event	1910	1911	1912	1913	1914	1919	1920	1921	1922	1923	1924	1928
Olympic Games							1st					
Winter Olympics											2nd	5th
World Championships	2nd	1st	2nd	2nd	1st				2nd	1st		
Nordic Championships						1st		1st				
Finnish Championships		1st						1st				
