= World Figure Skating Championships =

Annual figure skating competition

- Status: Active
- Genre: International championship event
- Frequency: Annual
- Inaugurated: 1896
- Previous event: 2026 World Championships
- Next event: 2027 World Championships
- Organizer: International Skating Union

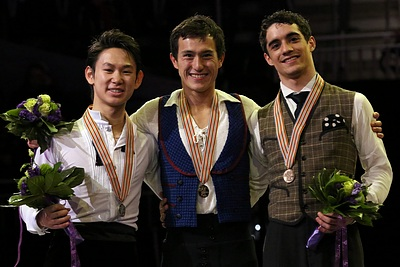
The gold, silver, and bronze medalists in the men's event at the 2013 World Championships: Patrick Chan of Canada (center), Denis Ten of Kazakhstan (left), and Javier Fernández of Spain (right)

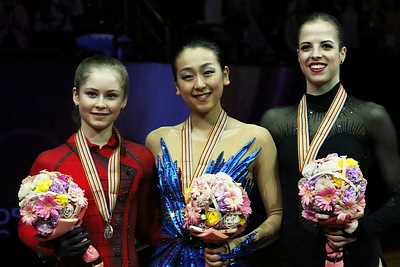
The gold, silver, and bronze medalists in the women's event at the 2014 World Championships: Mao Asada of Japan (center), Yulia Lipnitskaya of Russia (left), and Carolina Kostner of Italy (right)

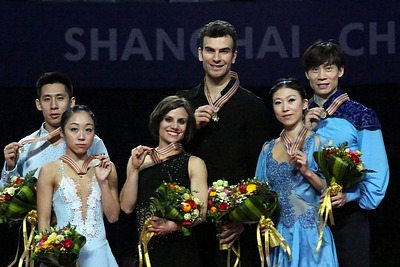
The gold, silver, and bronze medalists in the pairs event at the 2015 World Championships: Meagan Duhamel and Eric Radford of Canada (center), Sui Wenjing and Han Cong of China (left), and Pang Qing and Tong Jian of China (right)

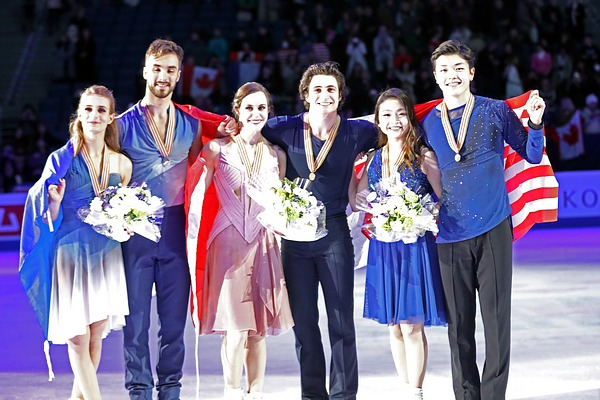
The gold, silver, and bronze medalists in the ice dance event at the 2017 World Championships: Tessa Virtue and Scott Moir of Canada (center), Gabriella Papadakis and Guillaume Cizeron of France (left), and Maia Shibutani and Alex Shibutani of the United States (right)

The World Figure Skating Championships are an annual figure skating competition sanctioned by the International Skating Union (ISU). The World Championships are considered the most prestigious event in figure skating. The first World Championships were held in 1896 in Saint Petersburg, Russia, and they have been held ever since with only four interruptions. A separate competition for women was established in 1905, with the men's and women's events held as separate competitions for several years. Pair skating was added in 1908 and ice dance in 1952. Skaters are eligible to compete at the World Championships, provided they represent a member nation of the International Skating Union and are selected by their respective federation.

The corresponding competition for junior-level skaters is the World Junior Figure Skating Championships. The corresponding competitions for synchronized skating are the World Synchronized Skating Championships and the World Junior Synchronized Skating Championships.

Medals are awarded in men's singles, women's singles, pair skating, and ice dance. Ulrich Salchow of Sweden holds the record for winning the most World Championship titles in men's singles (with ten), while Sonja Henie of Norway holds the record in women's singles (also with ten). Irina Rodnina and Alexander Zaitsev of the Soviet Union hold the record in pair skating (with six), although Rodnina won an additional four titles with a previous partner. Lyudmila Pakhomova and Aleksandr Gorshkov of the Soviet Union hold the record in ice dance (with six), while Guillaume Cizeron of France has also won six titles in ice dance, but not with the same partner.

== History ==
The International Skating Union (ISU) was formed in 1892 to govern international competition in speed skating and figure skating. The first World Championship event in figure skating, known as the Championship of the Internationale Eislauf-Vereingung, was held in Saint Petersburg, Russia, in 1896. There were four competitors and the winner of the event was Gilbert Fuchs of Germany.

Since competitive skating was generally viewed as a male sport, the championships were presumed to be an exclusive male event. However, there were no specific rules barring women from competing. In 1902, Madge Syers of Great Britain entered the championships and won the silver medal. The ISU Congress – the highest-ranking decision-making body of the ISU – considered gender issues at their meeting in 1903, but passed no new rules. The 1905 ISU Congress established a second-class women's competition called the ISU Championships, rather than World Championships; its winners were known as ISU Champions and not World Champions. Men's and women's events were generally held separately. The first competition for women was held in Davos, Switzerland, in 1906; the event was won by Syers.

The first competition for pair skating was held in Saint Petersburg in 1908. Early championships for both women and pairs – previously called ISU Championships – were retroactively given World Championship status in 1924.

In the early years, judges were invited by the host country and were often native to that country. At the 1927 women's event in Oslo, Norway, three of the five judges were Norwegian; those three judges awarded first place to Norwegian competitor Sonja Henie, while the Austrian and German judges placed defending champion Herma Szabo of Austria first. The controversial result stood, awarding Henie her first World Championship title, but the controversy led to the ISU introducing a new rule that allowed no more than one judge per country on a panel.

The 1930 World Championships in New York City were the first to be held outside Europe and combined all three competitions – men's singles, women's singles, and pair skating – into one event for the first time. Ice dance made its debut at the 1952 World Championships. Compulsory figures were retired from the World Championships after 1990.

As the Winter Olympics are usually held in February, every four years the World Championships occur roughly a month after Olympic events have ended. Historically, a number of Olympic medalists have chosen to skip the following World Championships; many skaters need time to rest due to physical and mental exhaustion, and some Olympic medalists chose to capitalize on their success by becoming professional skaters with companies such as the Ice Capades or Champions on Ice. Prior to 1993, professional skaters were barred from competing at the Olympics by the ISU, so choosing to pursue skating professionally had once meant the end of one's competitive career.

The World Championships have been interrupted four times in the competition's history: from 1915 through 1921 due to World War I, from 1940 through 1946 due to World War II, in 1961 after the crash of Sabena Flight 548, and in 2020 due to the COVID-19 pandemic.

The 2027 World Championships are scheduled to be held from March 15 to 21 in Tampere, Finland.

== Qualifying ==
Skaters may compete at the World Championships if they represent a member nation of the International Skating Union (ISU) and are selected by their federation. Member nations select their entries according to their own criteria. Some countries rely on the results of their national championships, while others have more varied criteria, which may include success at certain international events or specific technical requirements. All of the selected skaters must have earned the minimum total element scores, which are determined and published each season by the ISU, during the current or immediately previous season. Member nations may enter at least one competitor or team in each discipline; while a points system allows nations to enter additional competitors or teams, up to a total of three per discipline, based on the nation's performance in that discipline at the previous World Championships.

Age restrictions have changed throughout the history of the World Championships. Originally there were no age restrictions. For example, Sonja Henie of Norway – a three-time Olympic champion and ten-time World Champion in women's singles – debuted at the World Championships in 1924 at the age of 11. Beginning with the 1996–97 season, skaters had to be at least 15 years old before July 1 of the previous year. However, the ISU allowed for two exceptions. Firstly, skaters younger than 15 who had already competed in senior-level international events could continue. For example, Tara Lipinski of the United States – the 1998 Olympic champion in women's singles who debuted at the World Championships in 1996 at the age of 13 – was allowed to participate at the 1997 World Championships, where she won a gold medal at the age of 14. That exception expired naturally after a couple of seasons. Secondly, skaters who had won medals at the World Junior Figure Skating Championships were permitted to compete as seniors at the ISU Championships. For example, Sarah Hughes of the United States – the 2002 Olympic champion in women's singles – won the silver medal at the 1999 World Junior Championships, and was thus allowed to participate at the 1999 World Championships at the age of 13. That exception lasted through the 1999–2000 season.

At the ISU Congress held in June 2022, members of the ISU Council – the ISU's executive body responsible for determining policies – accepted a proposal to gradually increase the minimum age limit for senior competition to 17 beginning with the 2024–25 season. To avoid forcing skaters who had already competed in the senior category to return to juniors, the age limit remained unchanged during the 2022–23 season, before increasing to 16 during the 2023–24 season, and then to 17 during the 2024–25 season.

== Medalists ==
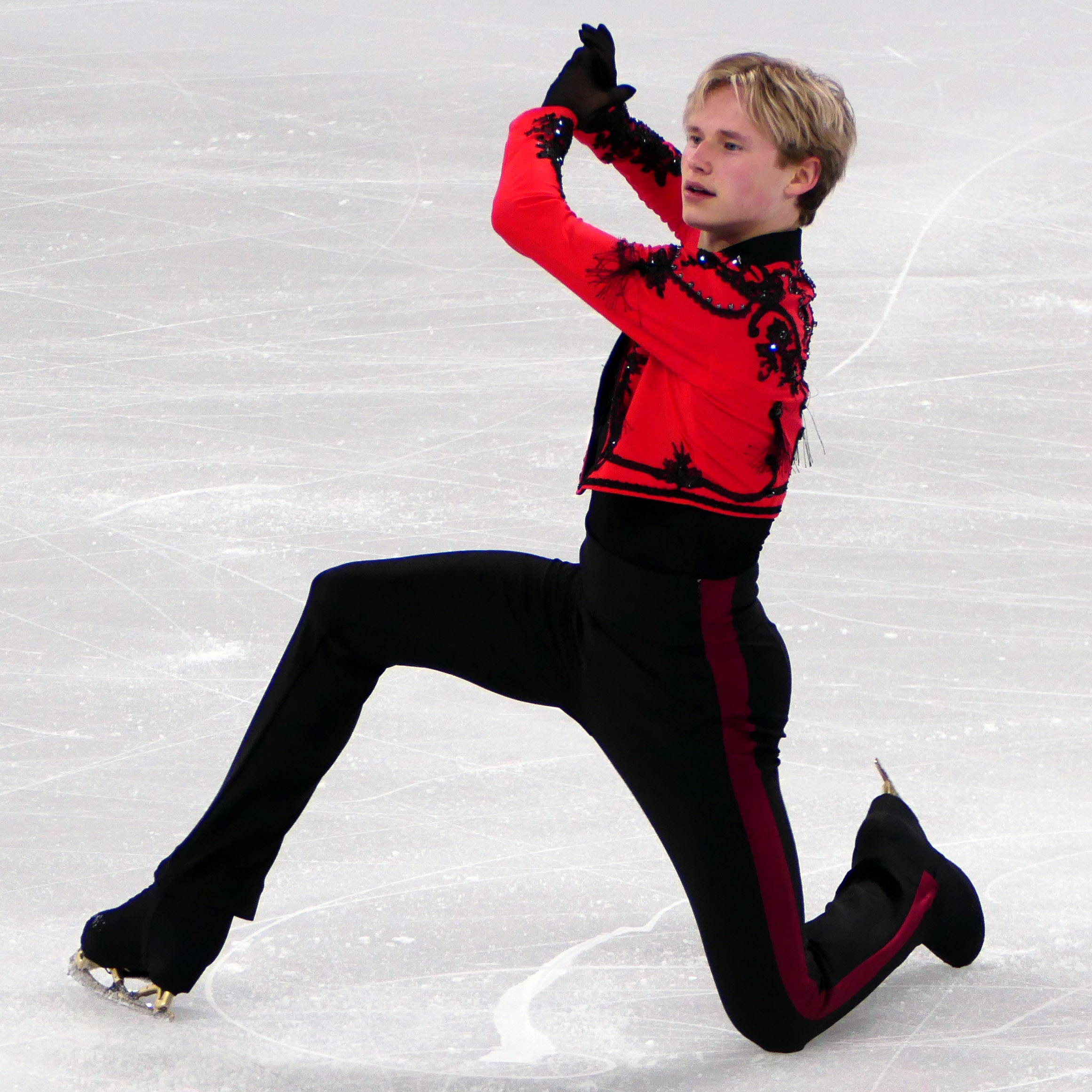
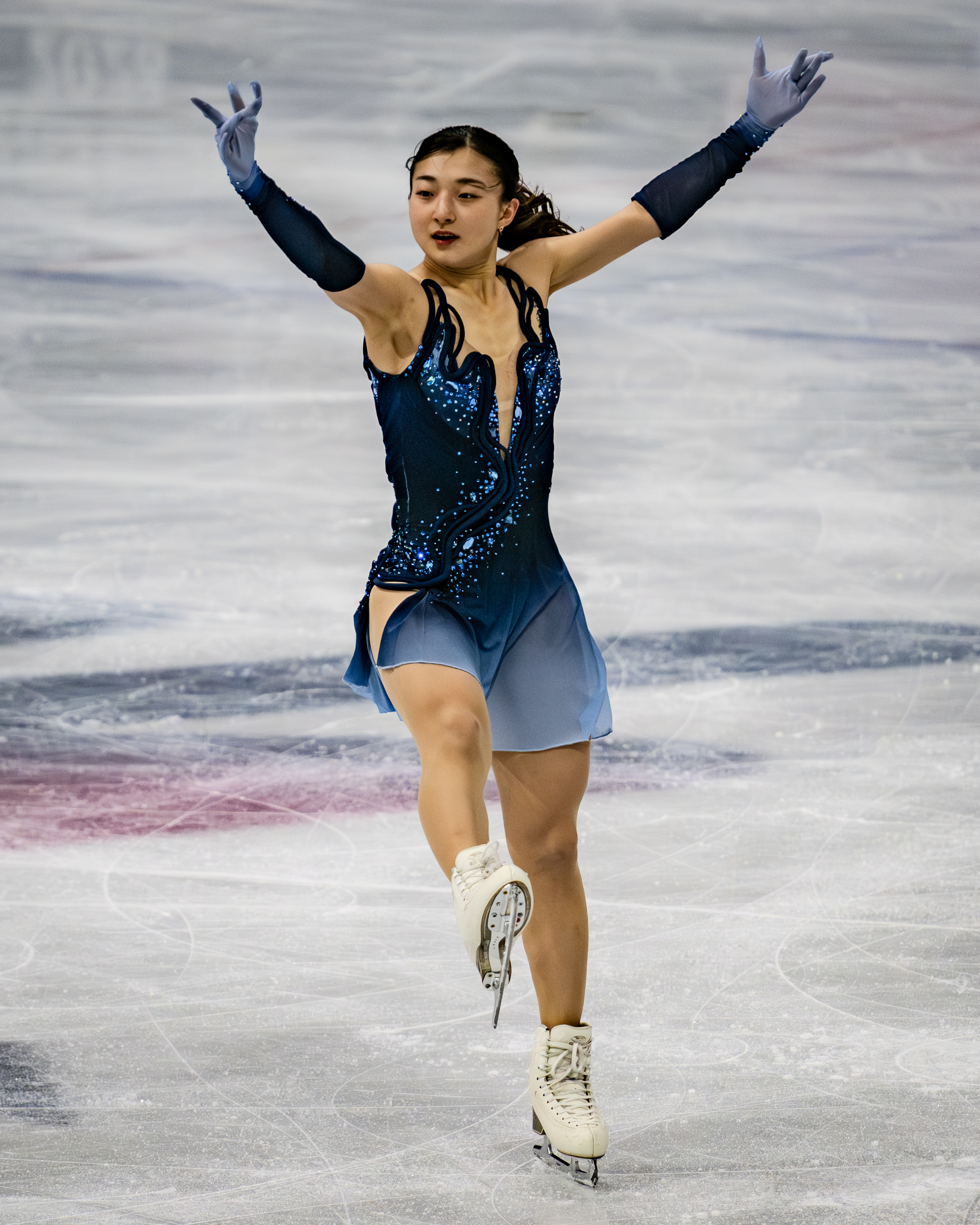
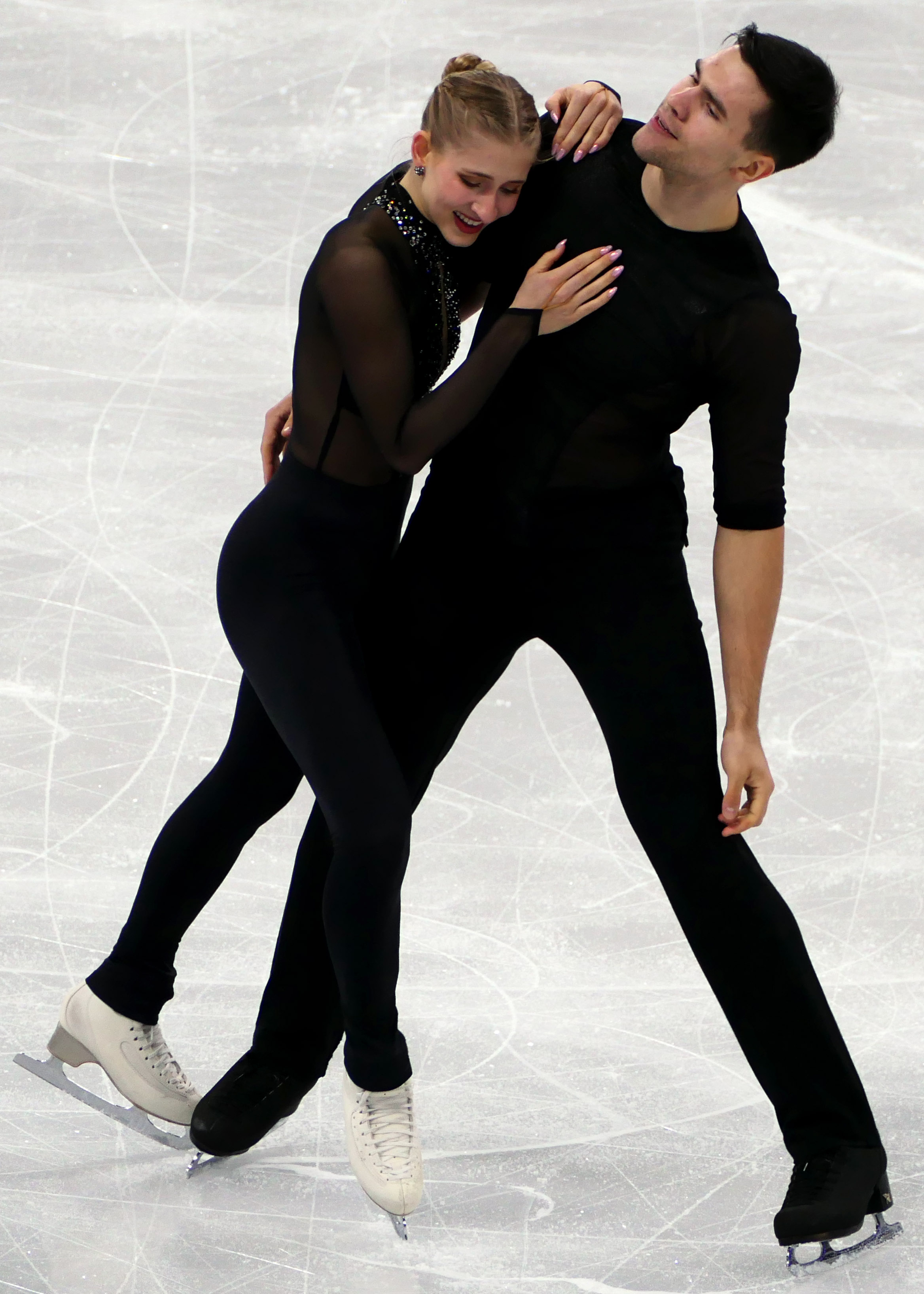
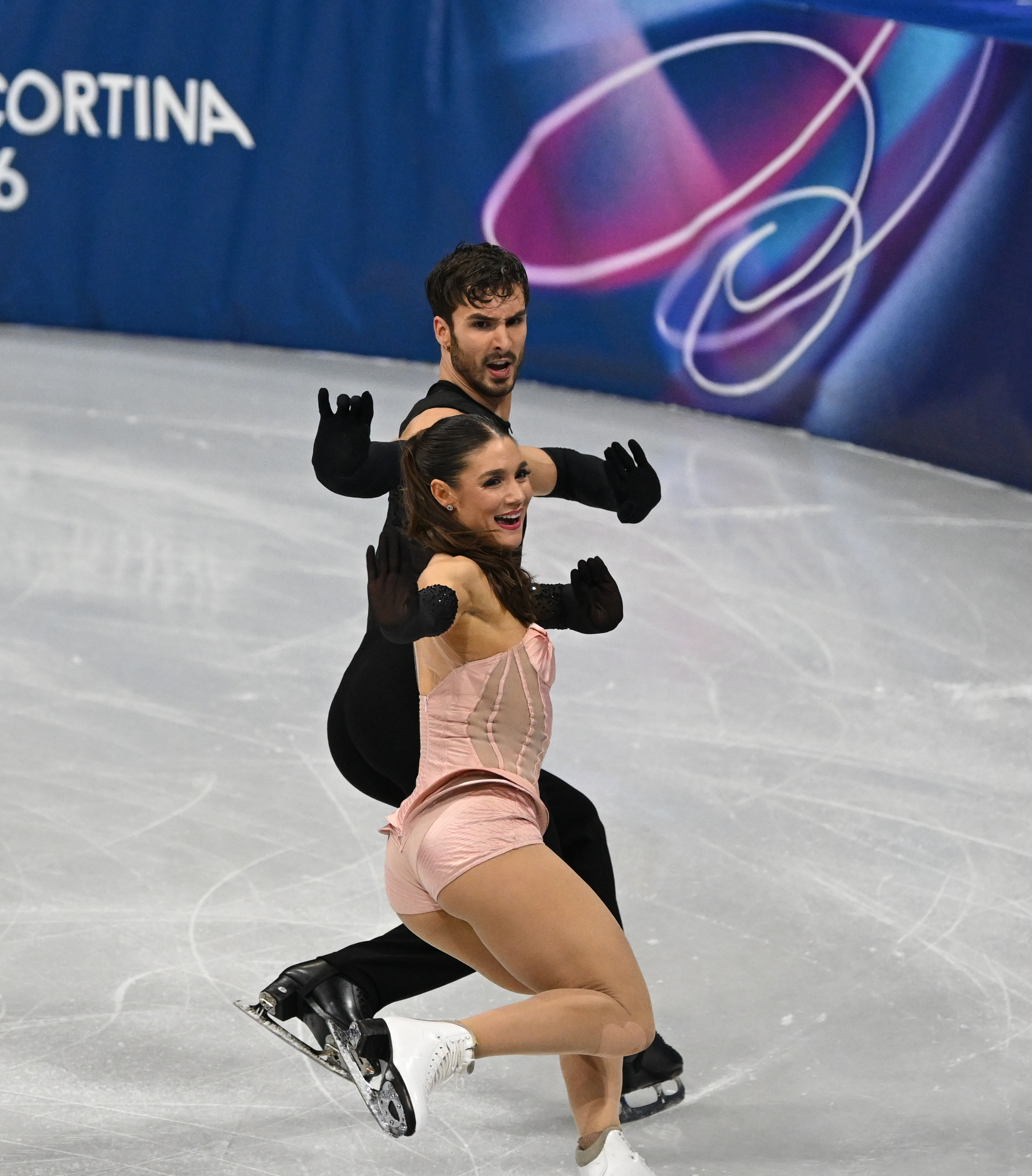
The reigning world champions (from left to right):
Ilia Malinin of the United States (men's singles); Kaori Sakamoto of Japan (women's singles); Minerva Fabienne Hase and Nikita Volodin of Germany (pair skating); and Laurence Fournier Beaudry and Guillaume Cizeron of France (ice dance)

=== Men's singles ===
Men's event medalists
Year	Location	Gold	Silver	Bronze	Ref.
1896	(Russia) St. Petersburg	(German Empire) Gilbert Fuchs	(Austria) Gustav Hügel	(Russia) Georg Sanders	
1897	(Sweden) Stockholm	(Austria) Gustav Hügel	(Sweden) Ulrich Salchow	(Norway) Johan Lefstad	
1898	(United Kingdom) London	(Sweden) Henning Grenander	(Austria) Gustav Hügel	(German Empire) Gilbert Fuchs	
1899	(Switzerland) Davos	(Austria) Gustav Hügel	(Sweden) Ulrich Salchow	(United Kingdom) Edgar Syers	
1900	(Switzerland) Davos	(Austria) Gustav Hügel	(Sweden) Ulrich Salchow	No other competitors	
1901	(Sweden) Stockholm	(Sweden) Ulrich Salchow	(German Empire) Gilbert Fuchs	No other competitors	
1902	(United Kingdom) London	(Sweden) Ulrich Salchow	(United Kingdom) Madge Syers	(German Empire) Martin Gordan	
1903	(Russia) St. Petersburg	(Sweden) Ulrich Salchow	(Russia) Nikolai Panin Kolomenkin	(Austria) Max Bohatsch	
1904	(Germany) Berlin	(Sweden) Ulrich Salchow	(German Empire) Heinrich Burger	(German Empire) Martin Gordan	
1905	(Sweden) Stockholm	(Sweden) Ulrich Salchow	(Austria) Max Bohatsch	(Sweden) Per Thorén	
1906	(Germany) Munich	(German Empire) Gilbert Fuchs	(German Empire) Heinrich Burger	(Sweden) Bror Meyer	
1907	(Austria-Hungary) Vienna	(Sweden) Ulrich Salchow	(Austria) Max Bohatsch	(German Empire) Gilbert Fuchs	
1908	(Austria-Hungary) Troppau	(Sweden) Ulrich Salchow	(German Empire) Gilbert Fuchs	(German Empire) Heinrich Burger	
1909	(Sweden) Stockholm	(Sweden) Ulrich Salchow	(Sweden) Per Thorén	(Austria) Ernst Herz	
1910	(Switzerland) Davos	(Sweden) Ulrich Salchow	(German Empire) Werner Rittberger	(Hungary) Andor Szende	
1911	(German Empire) Berlin	(Sweden) Ulrich Salchow	(German Empire) Werner Rittberger	(Austria) Fritz Kachler	
1912	(United Kingdom) Manchester	(Austria) Fritz Kachler	(German Empire) Werner Rittberger	(Hungary) Andor Szende	
1913	(Austria-Hungary) Vienna	(Austria) Fritz Kachler	(Austria) Willy Böckl	(Hungary) Andor Szende	
1914	(Russian Empire) Helsinki	(Sweden) Gösta Sandahl	(Austria) Fritz Kachler	(Austria) Willy Böckl	
1915–21	No competitions due to World War I				
1922	(Sweden) Stockholm	(Sweden) Gillis Grafström	(Austria) Fritz Kachler	(Austria) Willy Böckl	
1923	(Austria) Vienna	(Austria) Fritz Kachler	(Austria) Willy Böckl	(Sweden) Gösta Sandahl	
1924	(United Kingdom) Manchester	(Sweden) Gillis Grafström	(Austria) Willy Böckl	(Austria) Ernst Oppacher	
1925	(Austria) Vienna	(Austria) Willy Böckl	(Austria) Fritz Kachler	(Austria) Otto Preißecker	
1926	(Germany) Berlin	(Austria) Willy Böckl	(Austria) Otto Preißecker	(United Kingdom) John Page	
1927	(Switzerland) Davos	(Austria) Willy Böckl	(Austria) Otto Preißecker	(Austria) Karl Schäfer	
1928	(Germany) Berlin	(Austria) Willy Böckl	(Austria) Karl Schäfer	(Austria) Hugo Distler	
1929	(United Kingdom) London	(Sweden) Gillis Grafström	(Austria) Karl Schäfer	(Austria) Ludwig Wrede	
1930	(United States) New York City	(Austria) Karl Schäfer	(United States) Roger Turner	(Switzerland) Georges Gautschi	
1931	(Germany) Berlin	(Austria) Karl Schäfer	(United States) Roger Turner	(Germany) Ernst Baier	
1932	(Canada) Montreal	(Austria) Karl Schäfer	(Canada) Montgomery Wilson	(Germany) Ernst Baier	
1933	(Switzerland) Zürich	(Austria) Karl Schäfer	(Germany) Ernst Baier	(Finland) Marcus Nikkanen	
1934	(Sweden) Stockholm	(Austria) Karl Schäfer	(Germany) Ernst Baier	(Austria) Erich Erdös	
1935	(Hungary) Budapest	(Austria) Karl Schäfer	(United Kingdom) Jack Dunn	(Hungary) Dénes Pataky	
1936	(France) Paris	(Austria) Karl Schäfer	(United Kingdom) Graham Sharp	(Austria) Felix Kaspar	
1937	(Austria) Vienna	(Austria) Felix Kaspar	(United Kingdom) Graham Sharp	(Hungary) Elemér Terták	
1938	(Germany) Berlin	(Austria) Felix Kaspar	(United Kingdom) Graham Sharp	(Austria) Herbert Alward	
1939	(Hungary) Budapest	(United Kingdom) Graham Sharp	(United Kingdom) Freddie Tomlins	(Germany) Horst Faber	
1940–46	No competitions due to World War II				
1947	(Sweden) Stockholm	(Switzerland) Hans Gerschwiler	(United States) Dick Button	(United Kingdom) Arthur Apfel	
1948	(Switzerland) Davos	(United States) Dick Button	(Switzerland) Hans Gerschwiler	(Hungary) Ede Király	
1949	(France) Paris	(United States) Dick Button	(Hungary) Ede Király	(Austria) Edi Rada	
1950	(United Kingdom) London	(United States) Dick Button	(Hungary) Ede Király	(United States) Hayes Alan Jenkins	
1951	(Italy) Milan	(United States) Dick Button	(United States) James Grogan	(Austria) Hellmut Seibt	
1952	(France) Paris	(United States) Dick Button	(United States) James Grogan	(United States) Hayes Alan Jenkins	
1953	(Switzerland) Davos	(United States) Hayes Alan Jenkins	(United States) James Grogan	(Italy) Carlo Fassi	
1954	(Norway) Oslo	(United States) Hayes Alan Jenkins	(United States) James Grogan	(France) Alain Giletti	
1955	(Austria) Vienna	(United States) Hayes Alan Jenkins	(United States) Ronnie Robertson	(United States) David Jenkins	
1956	(West Germany) Garmisch-Partenkirchen	(United States) Hayes Alan Jenkins	(United States) Ronnie Robertson	(United States) David Jenkins	
1957	(United States) Colorado Springs	(United States) David Jenkins	(United States) Tim Brown	(Canada) Charles Snelling	
1958	(France) Paris	(United States) David Jenkins	(United States) Tim Brown	(France) Alain Giletti	
1959	(United States) Colorado Springs	(United States) David Jenkins	(Canada) Donald Jackson	(United States) Tim Brown	
1960	(Canada) Vancouver	(France) Alain Giletti	(Canada) Donald Jackson	(France) Alain Calmat	
1961	(Czechoslovakia) Prague	Competition cancelled due to the crash of Sabena Flight 548			
1962	(Czechoslovakia) Prague	(Canada) Donald Jackson	(Czechoslovakia) Karol Divín	(France) Alain Calmat	
1963	(Italy) Cortina d'Ampezzo	(Canada) Donald McPherson	(France) Alain Calmat	(Germany) Manfred Schnelldorfer	
1964	(West Germany) Dortmund	(Germany) Manfred Schnelldorfer	(France) Alain Calmat	(Czechoslovakia) Karol Divín	
1965	(United States) Colorado Springs	(France) Alain Calmat	(United States) Scott Allen	(Canada) Donald Knight	
1966	(Switzerland) Davos	(Austria) Emmerich Danzer	(Austria) Wolfgang Schwarz	(United States) Gary Visconti	
1967	(Austria) Vienna	(Austria) Emmerich Danzer	(Austria) Wolfgang Schwarz	(United States) Gary Visconti	
1968	(Switzerland) Geneva	(Austria) Emmerich Danzer	(United States) Tim Wood	(France) Patrick Péra	
1969	(United States) Colorado Springs	(United States) Tim Wood	(Czechoslovakia) Ondrej Nepela	(France) Patrick Péra	
1970	(Socialist Federal Republic of Yugoslavia) Ljubljana	(United States) Tim Wood	(Czechoslovakia) Ondrej Nepela	(East Germany) Günter Zöller	
1971	(France) Lyon	(Czechoslovakia) Ondrej Nepela	(France) Patrick Péra	(Soviet Union) Sergei Chetverukhin	
1972	(Canada) Calgary	(Czechoslovakia) Ondrej Nepela	(Soviet Union) Sergei Chetverukhin	(Soviet Union) Vladimir Kovalyov	
1973	(Czechoslovakia) Bratislava	(Czechoslovakia) Ondrej Nepela	(Soviet Union) Sergei Chetverukhin	(East Germany) Jan Hoffmann	
1974	(West Germany) Munich	(East Germany) Jan Hoffmann	(Soviet Union) Sergei Volkov	(Canada) Toller Cranston	
1975	(United States) Colorado Springs	(Soviet Union) Sergei Volkov	(Soviet Union) Vladimir Kovalyov	(United Kingdom) John Curry	
1976	(Sweden) Gothenburg	(United Kingdom) John Curry	(Soviet Union) Vladimir Kovalyov	(East Germany) Jan Hoffmann	
1977	(Japan) Tokyo	(Soviet Union) Vladimir Kovalyov	(East Germany) Jan Hoffmann	(Japan) Minoru Sano	
1978	(Canada) Ottawa	(United States) Charles Tickner	(East Germany) Jan Hoffmann	(United Kingdom) Robin Cousins	
1979	(Austria) Vienna	(Soviet Union) Vladimir Kovalyov	(United Kingdom) Robin Cousins	(East Germany) Jan Hoffmann	
1980	(West Germany) Dortmund	(East Germany) Jan Hoffmann	(United Kingdom) Robin Cousins	(United States) Charles Tickner	
1981	(United States) Hartford	(United States) Scott Hamilton	(United States) David Santee	(Soviet Union) Igor Bobrin	
1982	(Denmark) Copenhagen	(United States) Scott Hamilton	(Germany) Norbert Schramm	(Canada) Brian Pockar	
1983	(Finland) Helsinki	(United States) Scott Hamilton	(Germany) Norbert Schramm	(Canada) Brian Orser	
1984	(Canada) Ottawa	(United States) Scott Hamilton	(Canada) Brian Orser	(Soviet Union) Alexandre Fadeev	
1985	(Japan) Tokyo	(Soviet Union) Alexandre Fadeev	(Canada) Brian Orser	(United States) Brian Boitano	
1986	(Switzerland) Geneva	(United States) Brian Boitano	(Canada) Brian Orser	(Soviet Union) Alexandre Fadeev	
1987	(United States) Cincinnati	(Canada) Brian Orser	(United States) Brian Boitano	(Soviet Union) Alexandre Fadeev	
1988	(Hungary) Budapest	(United States) Brian Boitano	(Canada) Brian Orser	(Soviet Union) Viktor Petrenko	
1989	(France) Paris	(Canada) Kurt Browning	(United States) Christopher Bowman	(Poland) Grzegorz Filipowski	
1990	(Canada) Halifax	(Canada) Kurt Browning	(Soviet Union) Viktor Petrenko	(United States) Christopher Bowman	
1991	(Germany) Munich	(Canada) Kurt Browning	(Soviet Union) Viktor Petrenko	(United States) Todd Eldredge	
1992	(United States) Oakland	(Commonwealth of Independent States) Viktor Petrenko	(Canada) Kurt Browning	(Canada) Elvis Stojko	
1993	(Czech Republic) Prague	(Canada) Kurt Browning	(Canada) Elvis Stojko	(Russia) Alexei Urmanov	
1994	(Japan) Chiba	(Canada) Elvis Stojko	(France) Philippe Candeloro	(Ukraine) Vyacheslav Zahorodnyuk	
1995	(United Kingdom) Birmingham	(Canada) Elvis Stojko	(United States) Todd Eldredge	(France) Philippe Candeloro	
1996	(Canada) Edmonton	(United States) Todd Eldredge	(Russia) Ilia Kulik	(United States) Rudy Galindo	
1997	(Switzerland) Lausanne	(Canada) Elvis Stojko	(United States) Todd Eldredge	(Russia) Alexei Yagudin	
1998	(United States) Minneapolis	(Russia) Alexei Yagudin	(United States) Todd Eldredge	(Russia) Evgeni Plushenko	
1999	(Finland) Helsinki	(Russia) Alexei Yagudin	(Russia) Evgeni Plushenko	(United States) Michael Weiss	
2000	(France) Nice	(Russia) Alexei Yagudin	(Canada) Elvis Stojko	(United States) Michael Weiss	
2001	(Canada) Vancouver	(Russia) Evgeni Plushenko	(Russia) Alexei Yagudin	(United States) Todd Eldredge	
2002	(Japan) Nagano	(Russia) Alexei Yagudin	(United States) Timothy Goebel	(Japan) Takeshi Honda	
2003	(United States) Washington, D.C.	(Russia) Evgeni Plushenko	(United States) Timothy Goebel	(Japan) Takeshi Honda	
2004	(Germany) Dortmund	(Russia) Evgeni Plushenko	(France) Brian Joubert	(Germany) Stefan Lindemann	
2005	(Russia) Moscow	(Switzerland) Stéphane Lambiel	(Canada) Jeffrey Buttle	(United States) Evan Lysacek	
2006	(Canada) Calgary	(Switzerland) Stéphane Lambiel	(France) Brian Joubert	(United States) Evan Lysacek	
2007	(Japan) Tokyo	(France) Brian Joubert	(Japan) Daisuke Takahashi	(Switzerland) Stéphane Lambiel	
2008	(Sweden) Gothenburg	(Canada) Jeffrey Buttle	(France) Brian Joubert	(United States) Johnny Weir	
2009	(United States) Los Angeles	(United States) Evan Lysacek	(Canada) Patrick Chan	(France) Brian Joubert	
2010	(Italy) Turin	(Japan) Daisuke Takahashi	(Canada) Patrick Chan	(France) Brian Joubert	
2011	(Russia) Moscow	(Canada) Patrick Chan	(Japan) Takahiko Kozuka	(Russia) Artur Gachinski	
2012	(France) Nice	(Canada) Patrick Chan	(Japan) Daisuke Takahashi	(Japan) Yuzuru Hanyu	
2013	(Canada) London	(Canada) Patrick Chan	(Kazakhstan) Denis Ten	(Spain) Javier Fernández	
2014	(Japan) Saitama	(Japan) Yuzuru Hanyu	(Japan) Tatsuki Machida	(Spain) Javier Fernández	
2015	(China) Shanghai	(Spain) Javier Fernández	(Japan) Yuzuru Hanyu	(Kazakhstan) Denis Ten	
2016	(United States) Boston	(Spain) Javier Fernández	(Japan) Yuzuru Hanyu	(China) Jin Boyang	
2017	(Finland) Helsinki	(Japan) Yuzuru Hanyu	(Japan) Shoma Uno	(China) Jin Boyang	
2018	(Italy) Milan	(United States) Nathan Chen	(Japan) Shoma Uno	(Russia) Mikhail Kolyada	
2019	(Japan) Saitama	(United States) Nathan Chen	(Japan) Yuzuru Hanyu	(United States) Vincent Zhou	
2020	(Canada) Montreal	Competition cancelled due to the COVID-19 pandemic			
2021	(Sweden) Stockholm	(United States) Nathan Chen	(Japan) Yuma Kagiyama	(Japan) Yuzuru Hanyu	
2022	(France) Montpellier	(Japan) Shoma Uno	(Japan) Yuma Kagiyama	(United States) Vincent Zhou	
2023	(Japan) Saitama	(Japan) Shoma Uno	(South Korea) Cha Jun-hwan	(United States) Ilia Malinin	
2024	(Canada) Montreal	(United States) Ilia Malinin	(Japan) Yuma Kagiyama	(France) Adam Siao Him Fa	
2025	(United States) Boston	(United States) Ilia Malinin	(Kazakhstan) Mikhail Shaidorov	(Japan) Yuma Kagiyama	
2026	(Czech Republic) Prague	(United States) Ilia Malinin	(Japan) Yuma Kagiyama	(Japan) Shun Sato	

=== Women's singles ===
Women's event medalists
Year	Location	Gold	Silver	Bronze	Ref.
1906	(Switzerland) Davos	(United Kingdom) Madge Syers	(Austria) Jenny Herz	(Hungary) Lily Kronberger	
1907	(Austria-Hungary) Vienna	(United Kingdom) Madge Syers	(Austria) Jenny Herz	(Hungary) Lily Kronberger	
1908	(Austria-Hungary) Troppau	(Hungary) Lily Kronberger	(German Empire) Elsa Rendschmidt	No other competitors	
1909	(Austria-Hungary) Budapest	(Hungary) Lily Kronberger	No other competitors		
1910	(German Empire) Berlin	(Hungary) Lily Kronberger	(German Empire) Elsa Rendschmidt	No other competitors	
1911	(Austria-Hungary) Vienna	(Hungary) Lily Kronberger	(Hungary) Opika von Méray Horváth	(German Empire) Ludowika Eilers	
1912	(Switzerland) Davos	(Hungary) Opika von Méray Horváth	(United Kingdom) Dorothy Greenhough-Smith	(United Kingdom) Phyllis Johnson	
1913	(Sweden) Stockholm	(Hungary) Opika von Méray Horváth	(United Kingdom) Phyllis Johnson	(Sweden) Svea Norén	
1914	(Switzerland) St. Moritz	(Hungary) Opika von Méray Horváth	(Austria) Angela Hanka	(United Kingdom) Phyllis Johnson	
1915–21	No competitions due to World War I				
1922	(Sweden) Stockholm	(Austria) Herma Szabo	(Sweden) Svea Norén	(Norway) Margot Moe	
1923	(Austria) Vienna	(Austria) Herma Szabo	(Austria) Gisela Reichmann	(Sweden) Svea Norén	
1924	(Norway) Kristiania	(Austria) Herma Szabo	(Germany) Ellen Brockhöft	(United States) Beatrix Loughran	
1925	(Switzerland) Davos	(Austria) Herma Szabo	(Germany) Ellen Brockhöft	(Germany) Elisabeth Böckel	
1926	(Sweden) Stockholm	(Austria) Herma Szabo	(Norway) Sonja Henie	(United Kingdom) Kathleen Shaw	
1927	(Norway) Oslo	(Norway) Sonja Henie	(Austria) Herma Szabo	(Norway) Karen Simensen	
1928	(United Kingdom) London	(Norway) Sonja Henie	(United States) Maribel Vinson	(Austria) Fritzi Burger	
1929	(Hungary) Budapest	(Norway) Sonja Henie	(Austria) Fritzi Burger	(Austria) Melitta Brunner	
1930	(United States) New York City	(Norway) Sonja Henie	(Canada) Cecil Smith	(United States) Maribel Vinson	
1931	(Germany) Berlin	(Norway) Sonja Henie	(Austria) Hilde Holovsky	(Austria) Fritzi Burger	
1932	(Canada) Montreal	(Norway) Sonja Henie	(Austria) Fritzi Burger	(Canada) Constance Wilson-Samuel	
1933	(Sweden) Stockholm	(Norway) Sonja Henie	(Sweden) Vivi-Anne Hultén	(Austria) Hilde Holovsky	
1934	(Norway) Oslo	(Norway) Sonja Henie	(United Kingdom) Megan Taylor	(Austria) Liselotte Landbeck	
1935	(Austria) Vienna	(Norway) Sonja Henie	(United Kingdom) Cecilia Colledge	(Sweden) Vivi-Anne Hultén	
1936	(France) Paris	(Norway) Sonja Henie	(United Kingdom) Megan Taylor	(Sweden) Vivi-Anne Hultén	
1937	(United Kingdom) London	(United Kingdom) Cecilia Colledge	(United Kingdom) Megan Taylor	(Sweden) Vivi-Anne Hultén	
1938	(Sweden) Stockholm	(United Kingdom) Megan Taylor	(United Kingdom) Cecilia Colledge	(United States) Hedy Stenuf	
1939	(Czechoslovakia) Prague	(United Kingdom) Megan Taylor	(United States) Hedy Stenuf	(United Kingdom) Daphne Walker	
1940–46	No competitions due to World War II				
1947	(Sweden) Stockholm	(Canada) Barbara Ann Scott	(United Kingdom) Daphne Walker	(United States) Gretchen Merrill	
1948	(Switzerland) Davos	(Canada) Barbara Ann Scott	(Austria) Eva Pawlik	(Czechoslovakia) Jiřina Nekolová	
1949	(France) Paris	(Czechoslovakia) Alena Vrzáňová	(United States) Yvonne Sherman	(United Kingdom) Jeannette Altwegg	
1950	(United Kingdom) London	(Czechoslovakia) Alena Vrzáňová	(United Kingdom) Jeannette Altwegg	(United States) Yvonne Sherman	
1951	(Italy) Milan	(United Kingdom) Jeannette Altwegg	(France) Jacqueline du Bief	(United States) Sonya Klopfer	
1952	(France) Paris	(France) Jacqueline du Bief	(United States) Sonya Klopfer	(United States) Virginia Baxter	
1953	(Switzerland) Davos	(United States) Tenley Albright	(West Germany) Gundi Busch	(United Kingdom) Valda Osborn	
1954	(Norway) Oslo	(West Germany) Gundi Busch	(United States) Tenley Albright	(United Kingdom) Erica Batchelor	
1955	(Austria) Vienna	(United States) Tenley Albright	(United States) Carol Heiss	(Austria) Hanna Eigel	
1956	(West Germany) Garmisch-Partenkirchen	(United States) Carol Heiss	(United States) Tenley Albright	(Austria) Ingrid Wendl	
1957	(United States) Colorado Springs	(United States) Carol Heiss	(Austria) Hanna Eigel	(Austria) Ingrid Wendl	
1958	(France) Paris	(United States) Carol Heiss	(Austria) Ingrid Wendl	(Austria) Hanna Walter	
1959	(United States) Colorado Springs	(United States) Carol Heiss	(Austria) Hanna Walter	(Netherlands) Sjoukje Dijkstra	
1960	(Canada) Vancouver	(United States) Carol Heiss	(Netherlands) Sjoukje Dijkstra	(United States) Barbara Ann Roles	
1961	(Czechoslovakia) Prague	Competition cancelled due to the crash of Sabena Flight 548			
1962	(Czechoslovakia) Prague	(Netherlands) Sjoukje Dijkstra	(Canada) Wendy Griner	(Austria) Regine Heitzer	
1963	(Italy) Cortina d'Ampezzo	(Netherlands) Sjoukje Dijkstra	(Austria) Regine Heitzer	(France) Nicole Hassler	
1964	(West Germany) Dortmund	(Netherlands) Sjoukje Dijkstra	(Austria) Regine Heitzer	(Canada) Petra Burka	
1965	(United States) Colorado Springs	(Canada) Petra Burka	(Austria) Regine Heitzer	(United States) Peggy Fleming	
1966	(Switzerland) Davos	(United States) Peggy Fleming	(East Germany) Gabriele Seyfert	(Canada) Petra Burka	
1967	(Austria) Vienna	(United States) Peggy Fleming	(East Germany) Gabriele Seyfert	(Czechoslovakia) Hana Mašková	
1968	(Switzerland) Geneva	(United States) Peggy Fleming	(East Germany) Gabriele Seyfert	(Czechoslovakia) Hana Mašková	
1969	(United States) Colorado Springs	(East Germany) Gabriele Seyfert	(Austria) Beatrix Schuba	(Hungary) Zsuzsa Almássy	
1970	(Socialist Federal Republic of Yugoslavia) Ljubljana	(East Germany) Gabriele Seyfert	(Austria) Beatrix Schuba	(United States) Julie Lynn Holmes	
1971	(France) Lyon	(Austria) Beatrix Schuba	(United States) Julie Lynn Holmes	(Canada) Karen Magnussen	
1972	(Canada) Calgary	(Austria) Beatrix Schuba	(Canada) Karen Magnussen	(United States) Janet Lynn	
1973	(Czechoslovakia) Bratislava	(Canada) Karen Magnussen	(United States) Janet Lynn	(East Germany) Christine Errath	
1974	(West Germany) Munich	(East Germany) Christine Errath	(United States) Dorothy Hamill	(Netherlands) Dianne de Leeuw	
1975	(United States) Colorado Springs	(Netherlands) Dianne de Leeuw	(United States) Dorothy Hamill	(East Germany) Christine Errath	
1976	(Sweden) Gothenburg	(United States) Dorothy Hamill	(East Germany) Christine Errath	(Netherlands) Dianne de Leeuw	
1977	(Japan) Tokyo	(United States) Linda Fratianne	(East Germany) Anett Pötzsch	(West Germany) Dagmar Lurz	
1978	(Canada) Ottawa	(East Germany) Anett Pötzsch	(United States) Linda Fratianne	(Italy) Susanna Driano	
1979	(Austria) Vienna	(United States) Linda Fratianne	(East Germany) Anett Pötzsch	(Japan) Emi Watanabe	
1980	(West Germany) Dortmund	(East Germany) Anett Pötzsch	(West Germany) Dagmar Lurz	(United States) Linda Fratianne	
1981	(United States) Hartford	(Switzerland) Denise Biellmann	(United States) Elaine Zayak	(Austria) Claudia Kristofics-Binder	
1982	(Denmark) Copenhagen	(United States) Elaine Zayak	(East Germany) Katarina Witt	(Austria) Claudia Kristofics-Binder	
1983	(Finland) Helsinki	(United States) Rosalynn Sumners	(West Germany) Claudia Leistner	(Soviet Union) Elena Vodorezova	
1984	(Canada) Ottawa	(East Germany) Katarina Witt	(Soviet Union) Anna Kondrashova	(United States) Elaine Zayak	
1985	(Japan) Tokyo	(East Germany) Katarina Witt	(Soviet Union) Kira Ivanova	(United States) Tiffany Chin	
1986	(Switzerland) Geneva	(United States) Debi Thomas	(East Germany) Katarina Witt	(United States) Tiffany Chin	
1987	(United States) Cincinnati	(East Germany) Katarina Witt	(United States) Debi Thomas	(United States) Caryn Kadavy	
1988	(Hungary) Budapest	(East Germany) Katarina Witt	(Canada) Elizabeth Manley	(United States) Debi Thomas	
1989	(France) Paris	(Japan) Midori Ito	(West Germany) Claudia Leistner	(United States) Jill Trenary	
1990	(Canada) Halifax	(United States) Jill Trenary	(Japan) Midori Ito	(United States) Holly Cook	
1991	(Germany) Munich	(United States) Kristi Yamaguchi	(United States) Tonya Harding	(United States) Nancy Kerrigan	
1992	(United States) Oakland	(United States) Kristi Yamaguchi	(United States) Nancy Kerrigan	(China) Chen Lu	
1993	(Czech Republic) Prague	(Ukraine) Oksana Baiul	(France) Surya Bonaly	(China) Chen Lu	
1994	(Japan) Chiba	(Japan) Yuka Sato	(France) Surya Bonaly	(Germany) Tanja Szewczenko	
1995	(United Kingdom) Birmingham	(China) Chen Lu	(France) Surya Bonaly	(United States) Nicole Bobek	
1996	(Canada) Edmonton	(United States) Michelle Kwan	(China) Chen Lu	(Russia) Irina Slutskaya	
1997	(Switzerland) Lausanne	(United States) Tara Lipinski	(United States) Michelle Kwan	(France) Vanessa Gusmeroli	
1998	(United States) Minneapolis	(United States) Michelle Kwan	(Russia) Irina Slutskaya	(Russia) Maria Butyrskaya	
1999	(Finland) Helsinki	(Russia) Maria Butyrskaya	(United States) Michelle Kwan	(Russia) Julia Soldatova	
2000	(France) Nice	(United States) Michelle Kwan	(Russia) Irina Slutskaya	(Russia) Maria Butyrskaya	
2001	(Canada) Vancouver	(United States) Michelle Kwan	(Russia) Irina Slutskaya	(United States) Sarah Hughes	
2002	(Japan) Nagano	(Russia) Irina Slutskaya	(United States) Michelle Kwan	(Japan) Fumie Suguri	
2003	(United States) Washington, D.C.	(United States) Michelle Kwan	(Russia) Elena Sokolova	(Japan) Fumie Suguri	
2004	(Germany) Dortmund	(Japan) Shizuka Arakawa	(United States) Sasha Cohen	(United States) Michelle Kwan	
2005	(Russia) Moscow	(Russia) Irina Slutskaya	(United States) Sasha Cohen	(Italy) Carolina Kostner	
2006	(Canada) Calgary	(United States) Kimmie Meissner	(Japan) Fumie Suguri	(United States) Sasha Cohen	
2007	(Japan) Tokyo	(Japan) Miki Ando	(Japan) Mao Asada	(South Korea) Yuna Kim	
2008	(Sweden) Gothenburg	(Japan) Mao Asada	(Italy) Carolina Kostner	(South Korea) Yuna Kim	
2009	(United States) Los Angeles	(South Korea) Yuna Kim	(Canada) Joannie Rochette	(Japan) Miki Ando	
2010	(Italy) Turin	(Japan) Mao Asada	(South Korea) Yuna Kim	(Finland) Laura Lepistö	
2011	(Russia) Moscow	(Japan) Miki Ando	(South Korea) Yuna Kim	(Italy) Carolina Kostner	
2012	(France) Nice	(Italy) Carolina Kostner	(Russia) Alena Leonova	(Japan) Akiko Suzuki	
2013	(Canada) London	(South Korea) Yuna Kim	(Italy) Carolina Kostner	(Japan) Mao Asada	
2014	(Japan) Saitama	(Japan) Mao Asada	(Russia) Yulia Lipnitskaya	(Italy) Carolina Kostner	
2015	(China) Shanghai	(Russia) Elizaveta Tuktamysheva	(Japan) Satoko Miyahara	(Russia) Elena Radionova	
2016	(United States) Boston	(Russia) Evgenia Medvedeva	(United States) Ashley Wagner	(Russia) Anna Pogorilaya	
2017	(Finland) Helsinki	(Russia) Evgenia Medvedeva	(Canada) Kaetlyn Osmond	(Canada) Gabrielle Daleman	
2018	(Italy) Milan	(Canada) Kaetlyn Osmond	(Japan) Wakaba Higuchi	(Japan) Satoko Miyahara	
2019	(Japan) Saitama	(Russia) Alina Zagitova	(Kazakhstan) Elizabet Tursynbaeva	(Russia) Evgenia Medvedeva	
2020	(Canada) Montreal	Competition cancelled due to the COVID-19 pandemic			
2021	(Sweden) Stockholm	FSR Anna Shcherbakova	FSR Elizaveta Tuktamysheva	FSR Alexandra Trusova	
2022	(France) Montpellier	(Japan) Kaori Sakamoto	(Belgium) Loena Hendrickx	(United States) Alysa Liu	
2023	(Japan) Saitama	(Japan) Kaori Sakamoto	(South Korea) Lee Hae-in	(Belgium) Loena Hendrickx	
2024	(Canada) Montreal	(Japan) Kaori Sakamoto	(United States) Isabeau Levito	(South Korea) Kim Chae-yeon	
2025	(United States) Boston	(United States) Alysa Liu	(Japan) Kaori Sakamoto	(Japan) Mone Chiba	
2026	(Czech Republic) Prague	(Japan) Kaori Sakamoto	(Japan) Mone Chiba	(Belgium) Nina Pinzarrone	

=== Pairs ===
Pairs' event medalists
Year	Location	Gold	Silver	Bronze	Ref.
1908	(Russian Empire) St. Petersburg	(German Empire); Anna Hübler; Heinrich Burger	(United Kingdom); Phyllis Johnson; James H. Johnson	(Russian Empire); Lidia Popova; Alexander L. Fischer	
1909	(Sweden) Stockholm	(United Kingdom); Phyllis Johnson; James H. Johnson	(Sweden); Valborg Lindahl; Nils Rosenius	(Sweden); Gertrud Ström; Richard Johansson	
1910	(German Empire) Berlin	(German Empire); Anna Hübler; Heinrich Burger	(German Empire); (Finland); Ludowika Eilers; Walter Jakobsson	(United Kingdom); Phyllis Johnson; James H. Johnson	
1911	(Austria-Hungary) Vienna	(German Empire); (Finland); Ludowika Eilers; Walter Jakobsson	No other competitors		
1912	(United Kingdom) Manchester	(United Kingdom); Phyllis Johnson; James H. Johnson	(Finland); Ludowika Jakobsson; Walter Jakobsson	(Norway); Alexia Schøien; Yngvar Bryn	
1913	(Sweden) Stockholm	(Austria-Hungary); Helene Engelmann; Karl Mejstrik	(Finland); Ludowika Jakobsson; Walter Jakobsson	(Austria-Hungary); Christa von Szabó; Leo Horwitz	
1914	(Switzerland) St. Moritz	(Finland); Ludowika Jakobsson; Walter Jakobsson	(Austria-Hungary); Helene Engelmann; Karl Mejstrik	(Austria-Hungary); Christa von Szabó; Leo Horwitz	
1915–21	No competitions due to World War I				
1922	(Switzerland) Davos	(Austria); Helene Engelmann; Alfred Berger	(Finland); Ludowika Jakobsson; Walter Jakobsson	(Germany); Margaret Metzner; Paul Metzner	
1923	(Norway) Kristiania	(Finland); Ludowika Jakobsson; Walter Jakobsson	(Norway); Alexia Bryn; Yngvar Bryn	(Sweden); Elna Henrikson; Kaj af Ekström	
1924	(United Kingdom) Manchester	(Austria); Helene Engelmann; Alfred Berger	(United Kingdom); Ethel Muckelt; John F. Page	(Sweden); Elna Henrikson; Kaj af Ekström	
1925	(Austria) Vienna	(Austria); Herma Szabo; Ludwig Wrede	(France); Andrée Joly; Pierre Brunet	(Austria); Lilly Scholz; Otto Kaiser	
1926	(Germany) Berlin	(France); Andrée Joly; Pierre Brunet	(Austria); Lilly Scholz; Otto Kaiser	(Austria); Herma Szabo; Ludwig Wrede	
1927	(Austria) Vienna	(Austria); Herma Szabo; Ludwig Wrede	(Austria); Lilly Scholz; Otto Kaiser	(Czechoslovakia); Else Hoppe; Oscar Hoppe	
1928	(United Kingdom) London	(France); Andrée Joly; Pierre Brunet	(Austria); Lilly Scholz; Otto Kaiser	(Austria); Melitta Brunner; Ludwig Wrede	
1929	(Hungary) Budapest	(Austria); Lilly Scholz; Otto Kaiser	(Austria); Melitta Brunner; Ludwig Wrede	(Hungary); Olga Orgonista; Sándor Szalay	
1930	(United States) New York City	(France); Andrée Brunet; Pierre Brunet	(Austria); Melitta Brunner; Ludwig Wrede	(United States); Beatrix Loughran; Sherwin Badger	
1931	(Weimar Republic) Berlin	(Hungary); Emília Rotter; László Szollás	(Hungary); Olga Orgonista; Sándor Szalay	(Austria); Idi Papez; Karl Zwack	
1932	(Canada) Montreal	(France); Andrée Brunet; Pierre Brunet	(Hungary); Emília Rotter; László Szollás	(United States); Beatrix Loughran; Sherwin Badger	
1933	(Sweden) Stockholm	(Hungary); Emília Rotter; László Szollás	(Austria); Idi Papez; Karl Zwack	(Norway); Randi Bakke; Christen Christensen	
1934	(Finland) Helsinki	(Hungary); Emília Rotter; László Szollás	(Austria); Idi Papez; Karl Zwack	(Germany); Maxi Herber; Ernst Baier	
1935	(Hungary) Budapest	(Hungary); Emília Rotter; László Szollás	(Austria); Ilse Pausin; Erik Pausin	(Hungary); Lucy Galló; Rezső Dillinger	
1936	(France) Paris	(Germany); Maxi Herber; Ernst Baier	(Austria); Ilse Pausin; Erik Pausin	(United Kingdom); Violet Cliff; Leslie Cliff	
1937	(United Kingdom) London	(Germany); Maxi Herber; Ernst Baier	(Austria); Ilse Pausin; Erik Pausin	(United Kingdom); Violet Cliff; Leslie Cliff	
1938	(Germany) Berlin	(Germany); Maxi Herber; Ernst Baier	(Austria); Ilse Pausin; Erik Pausin	(Germany); Inge Koch; Günther Noack	
1939	(Hungary) Budapest	(Germany); Maxi Herber; Ernst Baier	(Austria); Ilse Pausin; Erik Pausin	(Germany); Inge Koch; Günther Noack	
1940–46	No competitions due to World War II				
1947	(Sweden) Stockholm	(Belgium); Micheline Lannoy; Pierre Baugniet	(United States); Karol Kennedy; Peter Kennedy	(Belgium); Suzanne Diskeuve; Edmond Verbustel	
1948	(Switzerland) Davos	(Belgium); Micheline Lannoy; Pierre Baugniet	(Hungary); Andrea Kékesy; Ede Király	(Canada); Suzanne Morrow; Wallace Diestelmeyer	
1949	(France) Paris	(Hungary); Andrea Kékesy; Ede Király	(United States); Karol Kennedy; Peter Kennedy	(United States); Ann Davies; Carleton Hoffner	
1950	(United Kingdom) London	(United States); Karol Kennedy; Peter Kennedy	(United Kingdom); Jennifer Nicks; John Nicks	(Hungary); Marianne Nagy; László Nagy	
1951	(Italy) Milan	(West Germany); Ria Baran; Paul Falk	(United States); Karol Kennedy; Peter Kennedy	(United Kingdom); Jennifer Nicks; John Nicks	
1952	(France) Paris	(West Germany); Ria Baran; Paul Falk	(United States); Karol Kennedy; Peter Kennedy	(United Kingdom); Jennifer Nicks; John Nicks	
1953	(Switzerland) Davos	(United Kingdom); Jennifer Nicks; John Nicks	(Canada); Frances Dafoe; Norris Bowden	(Hungary); Marianne Nagy; László Nagy	
1954	(Norway) Oslo	(Canada); Frances Dafoe; Norris Bowden	(Switzerland); Silvia Grandjean; Michel Grandjean	(Austria); Sissy Schwarz; Kurt Oppelt	
1955	(Austria) Vienna	(Canada); Frances Dafoe; Norris Bowden	(Austria); Sissy Schwarz; Kurt Oppelt	(Hungary); Marianne Nagy; László Nagy	
1956	(West Germany) Garmisch-Partenkirchen	(Austria); Sissy Schwarz; Kurt Oppelt	(Canada); Frances Dafoe; Norris Bowden	(West Germany); Marika Kilius; Franz Ningel	
1957	(United States) Colorado Springs	(Canada); Barbara Wagner; Robert Paul	(West Germany); Marika Kilius; Franz Ningel	(Canada); Maria Jelinek; Otto Jelinek	
1958	(France) Paris	(Canada); Barbara Wagner; Robert Paul	(Czechoslovakia); Věra Suchánková; Zdeněk Doležal	(Canada); Maria Jelinek; Otto Jelinek	
1959	(United States) Colorado Springs	(Canada); Barbara Wagner; Robert Paul	(West Germany); Marika Kilius; Hans-Jürgen Bäumler	(United States); Nancy Ludington; Ronald Ludington	
1960	(Canada) Vancouver	(Canada); Barbara Wagner; Robert Paul	(Canada); Maria Jelinek; Otto Jelinek	(West Germany); Marika Kilius; Hans-Jürgen Bäumler	
1961	(Czechoslovakia) Prague	Competition cancelled due to the crash of Sabena Flight 548			
1962	(Czechoslovakia) Prague	(Canada); Maria Jelinek; Otto Jelinek	(Soviet Union); Ludmila Belousova; Oleg Protopopov	(West Germany); Margret Göbl; Franz Ningel	
1963	(Italy) Cortina d'Ampezzo	(West Germany); Marika Kilius; Hans-Jürgen Bäumler	(Soviet Union); Ludmila Belousova; Oleg Protopopov	(Soviet Union); Tatiana Zhuk; Alexander Gavrilov	
1964	(West Germany) Dortmund	(West Germany); Marika Kilius; Hans-Jürgen Bäumler	(Soviet Union); Ludmila Belousova; Oleg Protopopov	(Canada); Debbi Wilkes; Guy Revell	
1965	(United States) Colorado Springs	(Soviet Union); Ludmila Belousova; Oleg Protopopov	(United States); Vivian Joseph; Ronald Joseph	(Soviet Union); Tatiana Zhuk; Alexander Gorelik	
1966	(Switzerland) Davos	(Soviet Union); Ludmila Belousova; Oleg Protopopov	(Soviet Union); Tatiana Zhuk; Alexander Gorelik	(United States); Cynthia Kauffman; Ronald Kauffman	
1967	(Austria) Vienna	(Soviet Union); Ludmila Belousova; Oleg Protopopov	(West Germany); Margot Glockshuber; Wolfgang Danne	(United States); Cynthia Kauffman; Ronald Kauffman	
1968	(Switzerland) Geneva	(Soviet Union); Ludmila Belousova; Oleg Protopopov	(Soviet Union); Tatiana Zhuk; Alexander Gorelik	(United States); Cynthia Kauffman; Ronald Kauffman	
1969	(United States) Colorado Springs	(Soviet Union); Irina Rodnina; Alexei Ulanov	(Soviet Union); Tamara Moskvina; Alexei Mishin	(Soviet Union); Ludmila Belousova; Oleg Protopopov	
1970	(Socialist Federal Republic of Yugoslavia) Ljubljana	(Soviet Union); Irina Rodnina; Alexei Ulanov	(Soviet Union); Lyudmila Smirnova; Andrei Suraikin	(East Germany); Heidemarie Steiner; Heinz-Ulrich Walther	
1971	(France) Lyon	(Soviet Union); Irina Rodnina; Alexei Ulanov	(Soviet Union); Lyudmila Smirnova; Andrei Suraikin	(United States); JoJo Starbuck; Kenneth Shelley	
1972	(Canada) Calgary	(Soviet Union); Irina Rodnina; Alexei Ulanov	(Soviet Union); Lyudmila Smirnova; Andrei Suraikin	(United States); JoJo Starbuck; Kenneth Shelley	
1973	(Czechoslovakia) Bratislava	(Soviet Union); Irina Rodnina; Alexander Zaitsev	(Soviet Union); Lyudmila Smirnova; Andrei Suraikin	(East Germany); Manuela Groß; Uwe Kagelmann	
1974	(West Germany) Munich	(Soviet Union); Irina Rodnina; Alexander Zaitsev	(Soviet Union); Lyudmila Smirnova; Alexei Ulanov	(East Germany); Romy Kermer; Rolf Oesterreich	
1975	(United States) Colorado Springs	(Soviet Union); Irina Rodnina; Alexander Zaitsev	(East Germany); Romy Kermer; Rolf Oesterreich	(East Germany); Manuela Groß; Uwe Kagelmann	
1976	(Sweden) Gothenburg	(Soviet Union); Irina Rodnina; Alexander Zaitsev	(East Germany); Romy Kermer; Rolf Oesterreich	(Soviet Union); Irina Vorobieva; Alexander Vlasov	
1977	(Japan) Tokyo	(Soviet Union); Irina Rodnina; Alexander Zaitsev	(Soviet Union); Irina Vorobieva; Alexander Vlasov	(United States); Tai Babilonia; Randy Gardner	
1978	(Canada) Ottawa	(Soviet Union); Irina Rodnina; Alexander Zaitsev	(East Germany); Manuela Mager; Uwe Bewersdorf	(United States); Tai Babilonia; Randy Gardner	
1979	(Austria) Vienna	(United States); Tai Babilonia; Randy Gardner	(Soviet Union); Marina Cherkasova; Sergei Shakhrai	(East Germany); Sabine Baeß; Tassilo Thierbach	
1980	(West Germany) Dortmund	(Soviet Union); Marina Cherkasova; Sergei Shakhrai	(East Germany); Manuela Mager; Uwe Bewersdorf	(Soviet Union); Marina Pestova; Stanislav Leonovich	
1981	(United States) Hartford	(Soviet Union); Irina Vorobieva; Igor Lisovski	(East Germany); Sabine Baeß; Tassilo Thierbach	(West Germany); Christina Riegel; Andreas Nischwitz	
1982	(Denmark) Copenhagen	(East Germany); Sabine Baeß; Tassilo Thierbach	(Soviet Union); Marina Pestova; Stanislav Leonovich	(United States); Caitlin Carruthers; Peter Carruthers	
1983	(Finland) Helsinki	(Soviet Union); Elena Valova; Oleg Vasiliev	(East Germany); Sabine Baeß; Tassilo Thierbach	(Canada); Barbara Underhill; Paul Martini	
1984	(Canada) Ottawa	(Canada); Barbara Underhill; Paul Martini	(Soviet Union); Elena Valova; Oleg Vasiliev	(East Germany); Sabine Baeß; Tassilo Thierbach	
1985	(Japan) Tokyo	(Soviet Union); Elena Valova; Oleg Vasiliev	(Soviet Union); Larisa Selezneva; Oleg Makarov	(Canada); Katherina Matousek; Lloyd Eisler	
1986	(Switzerland) Geneva	(Soviet Union); Ekaterina Gordeeva; Sergei Grinkov	(Soviet Union); Elena Valova; Oleg Vasiliev	(Canada); Cynthia Coull; Mark Rowsom	
1987	(United States) Cincinnati	(Soviet Union); Ekaterina Gordeeva; Sergei Grinkov	(Soviet Union); Elena Valova; Oleg Vasiliev	(United States); Jill Watson; Peter Oppegard	
1988	(Hungary) Budapest	(Soviet Union); Elena Valova; Oleg Vasiliev	(Soviet Union); Ekaterina Gordeeva; Sergei Grinkov	(Soviet Union); Larisa Selezneva; Oleg Makarov	
1989	(France) Paris	(Soviet Union); Ekaterina Gordeeva; Sergei Grinkov	(Canada); Cindy Landry; Lyndon Johnston	(Soviet Union); Elena Bechke; Denis Petrov	
1990	(Canada) Halifax	(Soviet Union); Ekaterina Gordeeva; Sergei Grinkov	(Canada); Isabelle Brasseur; Lloyd Eisler	(Soviet Union); Natalia Mishkutionok; Artur Dmitriev	
1991	(Germany) Munich	(Soviet Union); Natalia Mishkutionok; Artur Dmitriev	(Canada); Isabelle Brasseur; Lloyd Eisler	(United States); Natasha Kuchiki; Todd Sand	
1992	(United States) Oakland	(Commonwealth of Independent States); Natalia Mishkutionok; Artur Dmitriev	(Czechoslovakia); Radka Kovaříková; René Novotný	(Canada); Isabelle Brasseur; Lloyd Eisler	
1993	(Czech Republic) Prague	(Canada); Isabelle Brasseur; Lloyd Eisler	(Germany); Mandy Wötzel; Ingo Steuer	(Russia); Evgenia Shishkova; Vadim Naumov	
1994	(Japan) Chiba	(Russia); Evgenia Shishkova; Vadim Naumov	(Canada); Isabelle Brasseur; Lloyd Eisler	(Russia); Marina Eltsova; Andrei Bushkov	
1995	(United Kingdom) Birmingham	(Czech Republic); Radka Kovaříková; René Novotný	(Russia); Evgenia Shishkova; Vadim Naumov	(United States); Jenni Meno; Todd Sand	
1996	(Canada) Edmonton	(Russia); Marina Eltsova; Andrei Bushkov	(Germany); Mandy Wötzel; Ingo Steuer	(United States); Jenni Meno; Todd Sand	
1997	(Switzerland) Lausanne	(Germany); Mandy Wötzel; Ingo Steuer	(Russia); Marina Eltsova; Andrei Bushkov	(Russia); Oksana Kazakova; Artur Dmitriev	
1998	(United States) Minneapolis	(Russia); Elena Berezhnaya; Anton Sikharulidze	(United States); Jenni Meno; Todd Sand	(Germany); Peggy Schwarz; Mirko Müller	
1999	(Finland) Helsinki	(Russia); Elena Berezhnaya; Anton Sikharulidze	(China); Shen Xue; Zhao Hongbo	(Poland); Dorota Zagórska; Mariusz Siudek	
2000	(France) Nice	(Russia); Maria Petrova; Alexei Tikhonov	(China); Shen Xue; Zhao Hongbo	(France); Sarah Abitbol; Stéphane Bernadis	
2001	(Canada) Vancouver	(Canada); Jamie Salé; David Pelletier	(Russia); Elena Berezhnaya; Anton Sikharulidze	(China); Shen Xue; Zhao Hongbo	
2002	(Japan) Nagano	(China); Shen Xue; Zhao Hongbo	(Russia); Tatiana Totmianina; Maxim Marinin	(United States); Kyoko Ina; John Zimmerman	
2003	(United States) Washington, D.C.	(China); Shen Xue; Zhao Hongbo	(Russia); Tatiana Totmianina; Maxim Marinin	(Russia); Maria Petrova; Alexei Tikhonov	
2004	(Germany) Dortmund	(Russia); Tatiana Totmianina; Maxim Marinin	(China); Shen Xue; Zhao Hongbo	(China); Pang Qing; Tong Jian	
2005	(Russia) Moscow	(Russia); Tatiana Totmianina; Maxim Marinin	(Russia); Maria Petrova; Alexei Tikhonov	(China); Zhang Dan; Zhang Hao	
2006	(Canada) Calgary	(China); Pang Qing; Tong Jian	(China); Zhang Dan; Zhang Hao	(Russia); Maria Petrova; Alexei Tikhonov	
2007	(Japan) Tokyo	(China); Shen Xue; Zhao Hongbo	(China); Pang Qing; Tong Jian	(Germany); Aliona Savchenko; Robin Szolkowy	
2008	(Sweden) Gothenburg	(Germany); Aliona Savchenko; Robin Szolkowy	(China); Zhang Dan; Zhang Hao	(Canada); Jessica Dubé; Bryce Davison	
2009	(United States) Los Angeles	(Germany); Aliona Savchenko; Robin Szolkowy	(China); Zhang Dan; Zhang Hao	(Russia); Yuko Kavaguti; Alexander Smirnov	
2010	(Italy) Turin	(China); Pang Qing; Tong Jian	(Germany); Aliona Savchenko; Robin Szolkowy	(Russia); Yuko Kavaguti; Alexander Smirnov	
2011	(Russia) Moscow	(Germany); Aliona Savchenko; Robin Szolkowy	(Russia); Tatiana Volosozhar; Maxim Trankov	(China); Pang Qing; Tong Jian	
2012	(France) Nice	(Germany); Aliona Savchenko; Robin Szolkowy	(Russia); Tatiana Volosozhar; Maxim Trankov	(Japan); Narumi Takahashi; Mervin Tran	
2013	(Canada) London	(Russia); Tatiana Volosozhar; Maxim Trankov	(Germany); Aliona Savchenko; Robin Szolkowy	(Canada); Meagan Duhamel; Eric Radford	
2014	(Japan) Saitama	(Germany); Aliona Savchenko; Robin Szolkowy	(Russia); Ksenia Stolbova; Fedor Klimov	(Canada); Meagan Duhamel; Eric Radford	
2015	(China) Shanghai	(Canada); Meagan Duhamel; Eric Radford	(China); Sui Wenjing; Han Cong	(China); Pang Qing; Tong Jian	
2016	(United States) Boston	(Canada); Meagan Duhamel; Eric Radford	(China); Sui Wenjing; Han Cong	(Germany); Aliona Savchenko; Bruno Massot	
2017	(Finland) Helsinki	(China); Sui Wenjing; Han Cong	(Germany); Aliona Savchenko; Bruno Massot	(Russia); Evgenia Tarasova; Vladimir Morozov	
2018	(Italy) Milan	(Germany); Aljona Savchenko; Bruno Massot	(Russia); Evgenia Tarasova; Vladimir Morozov	(France); Vanessa James; Morgan Ciprès	
2019	(Japan) Saitama	(China); Sui Wenjing; Han Cong	(Russia); Evgenia Tarasova; Vladimir Morozov	(Russia); Natalia Zabiiako; Alexander Enbert	
2020	(Canada) Montreal	Competition cancelled due to the COVID-19 pandemic			
2021	(Sweden) Stockholm	FSR; Anastasia Mishina; Aleksandr Galliamov	(China); Sui Wenjing; Han Cong	FSR; Aleksandra Boikova; Dmitrii Kozlovskii	
2022	(France) Montpellier	(United States); Alexa Knierim; Brandon Frazier	(Japan); Riku Miura; Ryuichi Kihara	(Canada); Vanessa James; Eric Radford	
2023	(Japan) Saitama	(Japan); Riku Miura; Ryuichi Kihara	(United States); Alexa Knierim; Brandon Frazier	(Italy); Sara Conti; Niccolò Macii	
2024	(Canada) Montreal	(Canada); Deanna Stellato-Dudek; Maxime Deschamps	(Japan); Riku Miura; Ryuichi Kihara	(Germany); Minerva Fabienne Hase; Nikita Volodin	
2025	(United States) Boston	(Japan); Riku Miura; Ryuichi Kihara	(Germany); Minerva Fabienne Hase; Nikita Volodin	(Italy); Sara Conti; Niccolò Macii	
2026	(Czech Republic) Prague	(Germany); Minerva Fabienne Hase; Nikita Volodin	(Georgia (country)); Anastasiia Metelkina; Luka Berulava	(Canada); Lia Pereira; Trennt Michaud	

=== Ice dance ===
Ice dance event medalists
Year	Location	Gold	Silver	Bronze	Ref.
1952	(France) Paris	(United Kingdom); Jean Westwood; Lawrence Demmy	(United Kingdom); Joan Dewhirst; John Slater	(United States); Carol Ann Peters; Daniel Ryan	
1953	(Switzerland) Davos	(United Kingdom); Jean Westwood; Lawrence Demmy	(United Kingdom); Joan Dewhirst; John Slater	(United States); Carol Ann Peters; Daniel Ryan	
1954	(Norway) Oslo	(United Kingdom); Jean Westwood; Lawrence Demmy	(United Kingdom); Nesta Davies; Paul Thomas	(United States); Carmel Bodel; Edward Bodel	
1955	(Austria) Vienna	(United Kingdom); Jean Westwood; Lawrence Demmy	(United Kingdom); Pamela Weight; Paul Thomas	(United Kingdom); Barbara Radford; Raymond Lockwood	
1956	(West Germany) Garmisch-Partenkirchen	(United Kingdom); Pamela Weight; Paul Thomas	(United Kingdom); June Markham; Courtney Jones	(United Kingdom); Barbara Thompson; Gerard Rigby	
1957	(United States) Colorado Springs	(United Kingdom); June Markham; Courtney Jones	(Canada); Geraldine Fenton; William McLachlan	(United States); Sharon McKenzie; Bert Wright	
1958	(France) Paris	(United Kingdom); June Markham; Courtney Jones	(Canada); Geraldine Fenton; William McLachlan	(United States); Andree Anderson; Donald Jacoby	
1959	(United States) Colorado Springs	(United Kingdom); Doreen Denny; Courtney Jones	(United States); Andree Anderson; Donald Jacoby	(Canada); Geraldine Fenton; William McLachlan	
1960	(Canada) Vancouver	(United Kingdom); Doreen Denny; Courtney Jones	(Canada); Virginia Thompson; William McLachlan	(France); Christiane Guhel; Jean Paul Guhel	
1961	(Czechoslovakia) Prague	Competition cancelled due to the crash of Sabena Flight 548			
1962	(Czechoslovakia) Prague	(Czechoslovakia); Eva Romanová; Pavel Roman	(France); Christiane Guhel; Jean Paul Guhel	(Canada); Virginia Thompson; William McLachlan	
1963	(Italy) Cortina d'Ampezzo	(Czechoslovakia); Eva Romanová; Pavel Roman	(United Kingdom); Linda Shearman; Michael Phillips	(Canada); Paulette Doan; Kenneth Ormsby	
1964	(West Germany) Dortmund	(Czechoslovakia); Eva Romanová; Pavel Roman	(Canada); Paulette Doan; Kenneth Ormsby	(United Kingdom); Janet Sawbridge; David Hickinbottom	
1965	(United States) Colorado Springs	(Czechoslovakia); Eva Romanová; Pavel Roman	(United Kingdom); Janet Sawbridge; David Hickinbottom	(United States); Lorna Dyer; John Carrell	
1966	(Switzerland) Davos	(United Kingdom); Diane Towler; Bernard Ford	(United States); Kristin Fortune; Dennis Sveum	(United States); Lorna Dyer; John Carrell	
1967	(Austria) Vienna	(United Kingdom); Diane Towler; Bernard Ford	(United States); Lorna Dyer; John Carrell	(United Kingdom); Yvonne Suddick; Malcolm Cannon	
1968	(Switzerland) Geneva	(United Kingdom); Diane Towler; Bernard Ford	(United Kingdom); Yvonne Suddick; Malcolm Cannon	(United Kingdom); Janet Sawbridge; Jon Lane	
1969	(United States) Colorado Springs	(United Kingdom); Diane Towler; Bernard Ford	(Soviet Union); Lyudmila Pakhomova; Aleksandr Gorshkov	(United States); Judy Schwomeyer; James Sladky	
1970	(Socialist Federal Republic of Yugoslavia) Ljubljana	(Soviet Union); Lyudmila Pakhomova; Aleksandr Gorshkov	(United States); Judy Schwomeyer; James Sladky	(West Germany); Angelika Buck; Erich Buck	
1971	(France) Lyon	(Soviet Union); Lyudmila Pakhomova; Aleksandr Gorshkov	(West Germany); Angelika Buck; Erich Buck	(United States); Judy Schwomeyer; James Sladky	
1972	(Canada) Calgary	(Soviet Union); Lyudmila Pakhomova; Aleksandr Gorshkov	(West Germany); Angelika Buck; Erich Buck	(United States); Judy Schwomeyer; James Sladky	
1973	(Czechoslovakia) Bratislava	(Soviet Union); Lyudmila Pakhomova; Aleksandr Gorshkov	(West Germany); Angelika Buck; Erich Buck	(United Kingdom); Hilary Green; Glyn Watts	
1974	(West Germany) Munich	(Soviet Union); Lyudmila Pakhomova; Aleksandr Gorshkov	(United Kingdom); Hilary Green; Glyn Watts	(Soviet Union); Natalia Linichuk; Gennadi Karponosov	
1975	(United States) Colorado Springs	(Soviet Union); Irina Moiseeva; Andrei Minenkov	(United States); Colleen O'Connor; James Millns	(United Kingdom); Hilary Green; Glyn Watts	
1976	(Sweden) Gothenburg	(Soviet Union); Lyudmila Pakhomova; Aleksandr Gorshkov	(Soviet Union); Irina Moiseeva; Andrei Minenkov	(United States); Colleen O'Connor; James Millns	
1977	(Japan) Tokyo	(Soviet Union); Irina Moiseeva; Andrei Minenkov	(United Kingdom); Janet Thompson; Warren Maxwell	(Soviet Union); Natalia Linichuk; Gennadi Karponosov	
1978	(Canada) Ottawa	(Soviet Union); Natalia Linichuk; Gennadi Karponosov	(Soviet Union); Irina Moiseeva; Andrei Minenkov	(Hungary); Krisztina Regőczy; András Sallay	
1979	(Austria) Vienna	(Soviet Union); Natalia Linichuk; Gennadi Karponosov	(Hungary); Krisztina Regőczy; András Sallay	(Soviet Union); Irina Moiseeva; Andrei Minenkov	
1980	(West Germany) Dortmund	(Hungary); Krisztina Regőczy; András Sallay	(Soviet Union); Natalia Linichuk; Gennadi Karponosov	(Soviet Union); Irina Moiseeva; Andrei Minenkov	
1981	(United States) Hartford	(United Kingdom); Jayne Torvill; Christopher Dean	(Soviet Union); Irina Moiseeva; Andrei Minenkov	(Soviet Union); Natalia Bestemianova; Andrei Bukin	
1982	(Denmark) Copenhagen	(United Kingdom); Jayne Torvill; Christopher Dean	(Soviet Union); Natalia Bestemianova; Andrei Bukin	(Soviet Union); Irina Moiseeva; Andrei Minenkov	
1983	(Finland) Helsinki	(United Kingdom); Jayne Torvill; Christopher Dean	(Soviet Union); Natalia Bestemianova; Andrei Bukin	(United States); Judy Blumberg; Michael Seibert	
1984	(Canada) Ottawa	(United Kingdom); Jayne Torvill; Christopher Dean	(Soviet Union); Natalia Bestemianova; Andrei Bukin	(United States); Judy Blumberg; Michael Seibert	
1985	(Japan) Tokyo	(Soviet Union); Natalia Bestemianova; Andrei Bukin	(Soviet Union); Marina Klimova; Sergei Ponomarenko	(United States); Judy Blumberg; Michael Seibert	
1986	(Switzerland) Geneva	(Soviet Union); Natalia Bestemianova; Andrei Bukin	(Soviet Union); Marina Klimova; Sergei Ponomarenko	(Canada); Tracy Wilson; Robert McCall	
1987	(United States) Cincinnati	(Soviet Union); Natalia Bestemianova; Andrei Bukin	(Soviet Union); Marina Klimova; Sergei Ponomarenko	(Canada); Tracy Wilson; Robert McCall	
1988	(Hungary) Budapest	(Soviet Union); Natalia Bestemianova; Andrei Bukin	(Soviet Union); Marina Klimova; Sergei Ponomarenko	(Canada); Tracy Wilson; Robert McCall	
1989	(France) Paris	(Soviet Union); Marina Klimova; Sergei Ponomarenko	(Soviet Union); Maya Usova; Alexander Zhulin	(France); Isabelle Duchesnay; Paul Duchesnay	
1990	(Canada) Halifax	(Soviet Union); Marina Klimova; Sergei Ponomarenko	(France); Isabelle Duchesnay; Paul Duchesnay	(Soviet Union); Maya Usova; Alexander Zhulin	
1991	(Germany) Munich	(France); Isabelle Duchesnay; Paul Duchesnay	(Soviet Union); Marina Klimova; Sergei Ponomarenko	(Soviet Union); Maya Usova; Alexander Zhulin	
1992	(United States) Oakland	(Commonwealth of Independent States); Marina Klimova; Sergei Ponomarenko	(Commonwealth of Independent States); Maya Usova; Alexander Zhulin	(Commonwealth of Independent States); Oksana Grishuk; Evgeni Platov	
1993	(Czech Republic) Prague	(Russia); Maya Usova; Alexander Zhulin	(Russia); Oksana Grishuk; Evgeni Platov	(Russia); Anjelika Krylova; Vladimir Fedorov	
1994	(Japan) Chiba	(Russia); Oksana Grishuk; Evgeni Platov	(France); Sophie Moniotte; Pascal Lavanchy	(Finland); Susanna Rahkamo; Petri Kokko	
1995	(United Kingdom) Birmingham	(Russia); Oksana Grishuk; Evgeni Platov	(Finland); Susanna Rahkamo; Petri Kokko	(France); Sophie Moniotte; Pascal Lavanchy	
1996	(Canada) Edmonton	(Russia); Oksana Grishuk; Evgeni Platov	(Russia); Anjelika Krylova; Oleg Ovsyannikov	(Canada); Shae-Lynn Bourne; Victor Kraatz	
1997	(Switzerland) Lausanne	(Russia); Oksana Grishuk; Evgeni Platov	(Russia); Anjelika Krylova; Oleg Ovsyannikov	(Canada); Shae-Lynn Bourne; Victor Kraatz	
1998	(United States) Minneapolis	(Russia); Anjelika Krylova; Oleg Ovsyannikov	(France); Marina Anissina; Gwendal Peizerat	(Canada); Shae-Lynn Bourne; Victor Kraatz	
1999	(Finland) Helsinki	(Russia); Anjelika Krylova; Oleg Ovsyannikov	(France); Marina Anissina; Gwendal Peizerat	(Canada); Shae-Lynn Bourne; Victor Kraatz	
2000	(France) Nice	(France); Marina Anissina; Gwendal Peizerat	(Italy); Barbara Fusar-Poli; Maurizio Margaglio	(Lithuania); Margarita Drobiazko; Povilas Vanagas	
2001	(Canada) Vancouver	(Italy); Barbara Fusar-Poli; Maurizio Margaglio	(France); Marina Anissina; Gwendal Peizerat	(Russia); Irina Lobacheva; Ilia Averbukh	
2002	(Japan) Nagano	(Russia); Irina Lobacheva; Ilia Averbukh	(Canada); Shae-Lynn Bourne; Victor Kraatz	(Israel); Galit Chait; Sergei Sakhnovski	
2003	(United States) Washington, D.C.	(Canada); Shae-Lynn Bourne; Victor Kraatz	(Russia); Irina Lobacheva; Ilia Averbukh	(Bulgaria); Albena Denkova; Maxim Staviski	
2004	(Germany) Dortmund	(Russia); Tatiana Navka; Roman Kostomarov	(Bulgaria); Albena Denkova; Maxim Staviski	(Germany); Kati Winkler; René Lohse	
2005	(Russia) Moscow	(Russia); Tatiana Navka; Roman Kostomarov	(United States); Tanith Belbin; Benjamin Agosto	(Ukraine); Elena Grushina; Ruslan Goncharov	
2006	(Canada) Calgary	(Bulgaria); Albena Denkova; Maxim Staviski	(Canada); Marie-France Dubreuil; Patrice Lauzon	(United States); Tanith Belbin; Benjamin Agosto	
2007	(Japan) Tokyo	(Bulgaria); Albena Denkova; Maxim Staviski	(Canada); Marie-France Dubreuil; Patrice Lauzon	(United States); Tanith Belbin; Benjamin Agosto	
2008	(Sweden) Gothenburg	(France); Isabelle Delobel; Olivier Schoenfelder	(Canada); Tessa Virtue; Scott Moir	(Russia); Jana Khokhlova; Sergei Novitski	
2009	(United States) Los Angeles	(Russia); Oksana Domnina; Maxim Shabalin	(United States); Tanith Belbin; Benjamin Agosto	(Canada); Tessa Virtue; Scott Moir	
2010	(Italy) Turin	(Canada); Tessa Virtue; Scott Moir	(United States); Meryl Davis; Charlie White	(Italy); Federica Faiella; Massimo Scali	
2011	(Russia) Moscow	(United States); Meryl Davis; Charlie White	(Canada); Tessa Virtue; Scott Moir	(United States); Maia Shibutani; Alex Shibutani	
2012	(France) Nice	(Canada); Tessa Virtue; Scott Moir	(United States); Meryl Davis; Charlie White	(France); Nathalie Péchalat; Fabian Bourzat	
2013	(Canada) London	(United States); Meryl Davis; Charlie White	(Canada); Tessa Virtue; Scott Moir	(Russia); Ekaterina Bobrova; Dmitri Soloviev	
2014	(Japan) Saitama	(Italy); Anna Cappellini; Luca Lanotte	(Canada); Kaitlyn Weaver; Andrew Poje	(France); Nathalie Péchalat; Fabian Bourzat	
2015	(China) Shanghai	(France); Gabriella Papadakis; Guillaume Cizeron	(United States); Madison Chock; Evan Bates	(Canada); Kaitlyn Weaver; Andrew Poje	
2016	(United States) Boston	(France); Gabriella Papadakis; Guillaume Cizeron	(United States); Maia Shibutani; Alex Shibutani	(United States); Madison Chock; Evan Bates	
2017	(Finland) Helsinki	(Canada); Tessa Virtue; Scott Moir	(France); Gabriella Papadakis; Guillaume Cizeron	(United States); Maia Shibutani; Alex Shibutani	
2018	(Italy) Milan	(France); Gabriella Papadakis; Guillaume Cizeron	(United States); Madison Hubbell; Zachary Donohue	(Canada); Kaitlyn Weaver; Andrew Poje	
2019	(Japan) Saitama	(France); Gabriella Papadakis; Guillaume Cizeron	(Russia); Victoria Sinitsina; Nikita Katsalapov	(United States); Madison Hubbell; Zachary Donohue	
2020	(Canada) Montreal	Competition cancelled due to the COVID-19 pandemic			
2021	(Sweden) Stockholm	FSR; Victoria Sinitsina; Nikita Katsalapov	(United States); Madison Hubbell; Zachary Donohue	(Canada); Piper Gilles; Paul Poirier	
2022	(France) Montpellier	(France); Gabriella Papadakis; Guillaume Cizeron	(United States); Madison Hubbell; Zachary Donohue	(United States); Madison Chock; Evan Bates	
2023	(Japan) Saitama	(United States); Madison Chock; Evan Bates	(Italy); Charlène Guignard; Marco Fabbri	(Canada); Piper Gilles; Paul Poirier	
2024	(Canada) Montreal	(United States); Madison Chock; Evan Bates	(Canada); Piper Gilles; Paul Poirier	(Italy); Charlène Guignard; Marco Fabbri	
2025	(United States) Boston	(United States); Madison Chock; Evan Bates	(Canada); Piper Gilles; Paul Poirier	(United Kingdom); Lilah Fear; Lewis Gibson	
2026	(Czech Republic) Prague	(France); Laurence Fournier Beaudry; Guillaume Cizeron	(Canada); Piper Gilles; Paul Poirier	(United States); Emilea Zingas; Vadym Kolesnik	

== Records ==
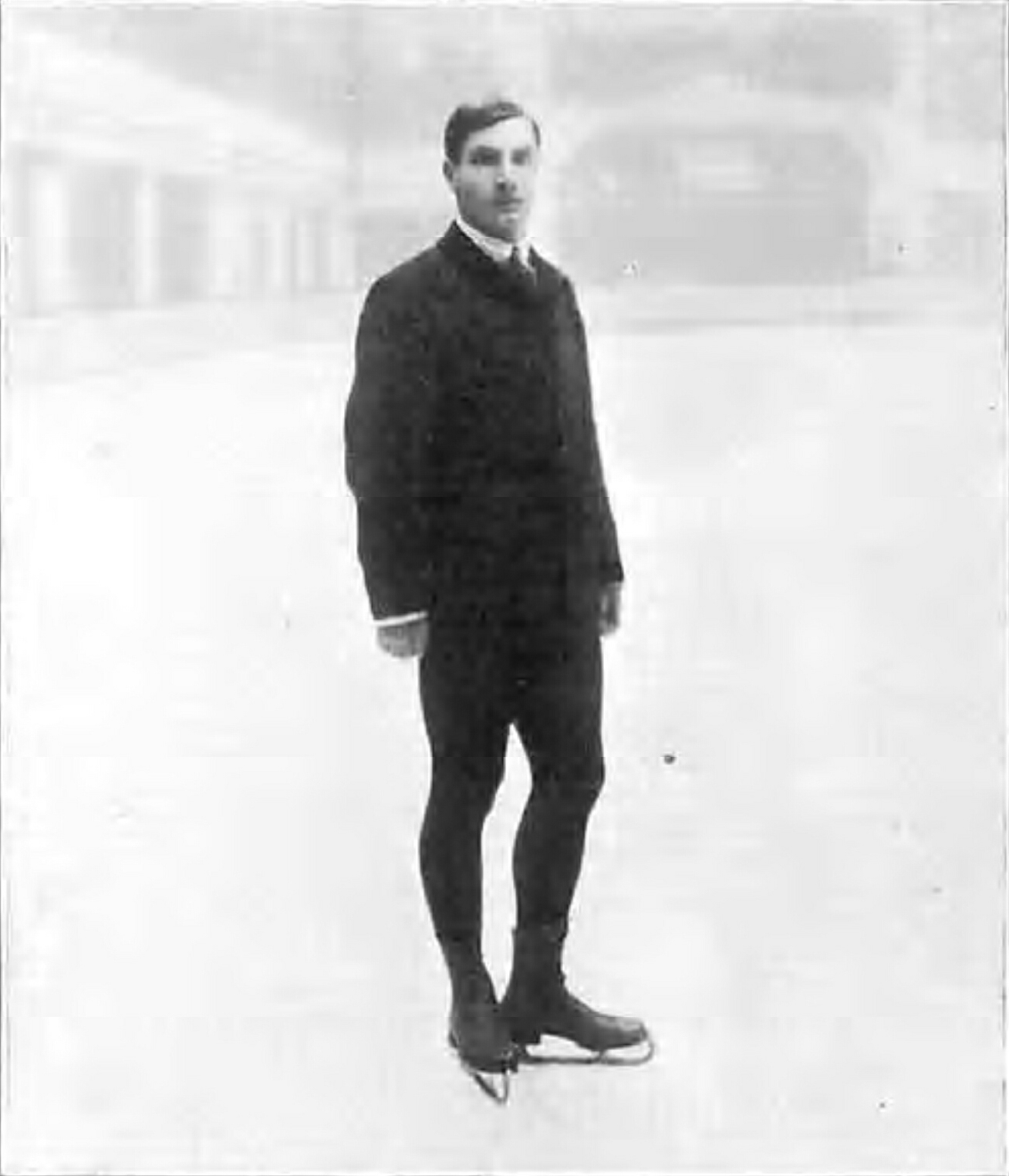
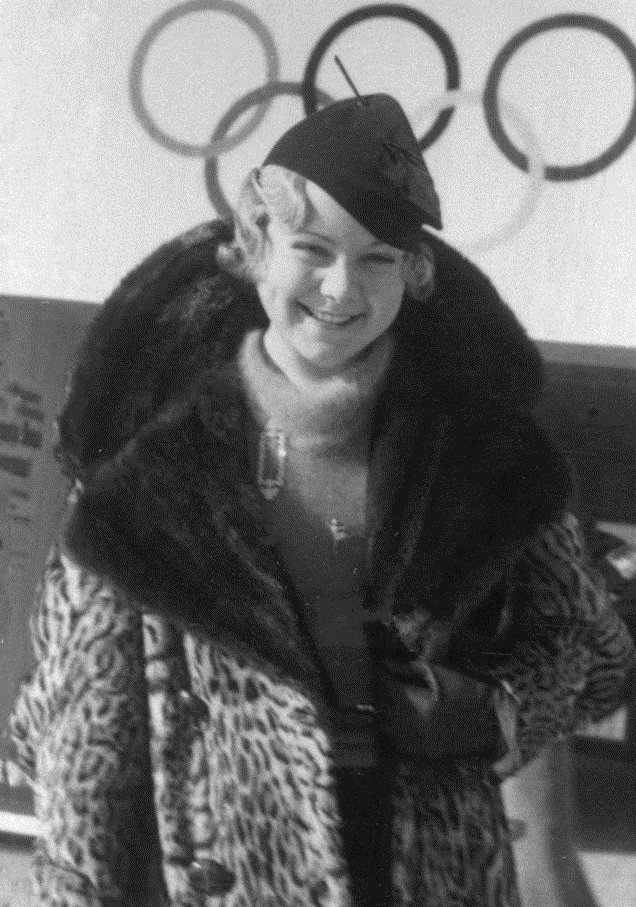
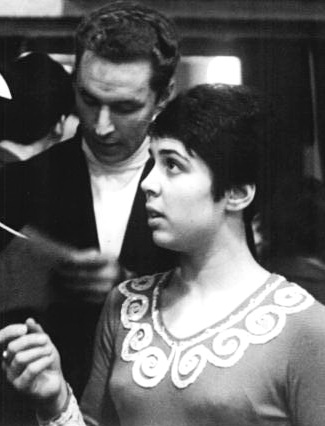
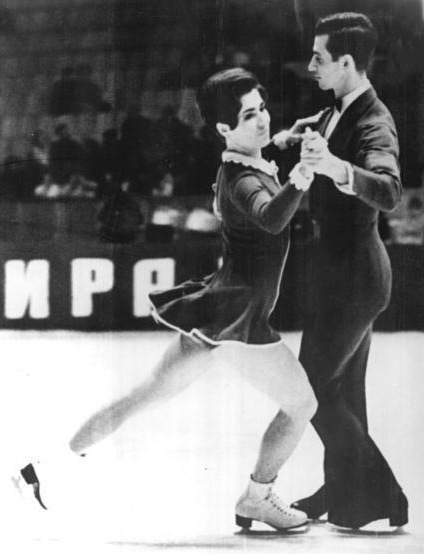
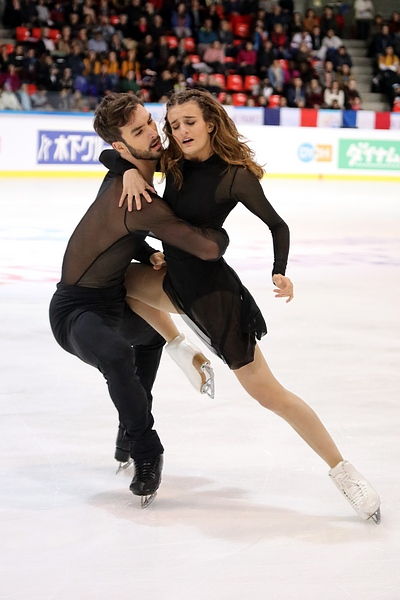
From left to right: Ulrich Salchow of Sweden won ten World Championship titles in men's singles; Sonja Henie of Norway won ten World Championship titles in women's singles; Irina Rodnina of the Soviet Union won ten World Championship titles in pair skating, four of which were with Alexei Ulanov; Lyudmila Pakhomova and Aleksandr Gorshkov of the Soviet Union won six World Championship titles in ice dance; and Guillaume Cizeron of France has also won six World Championship titles in ice dance, five of which were with Gabriella Papadakis.

Records
Discipline	Most championship titles			
Discipline	Skater(s)	No.	Years	Ref.
Men's singles	(Sweden); Ulrich Salchow	10	1901–05; 1907–11	
Women's singles	(Norway); Sonja Henie	10	1927–36	
Pairs	(Soviet Union); Irina Rodnina; (Note: Irina Rodnina won four championship titles while partnered with Alexei Ulanov (1969–72) and six with Alexander Zaitsev (1973–78).)	10	1969–78	
Pairs	(Soviet Union); Irina Rodnina; Alexander Zaitsev	6	1973–78	
Ice dance	(France); Guillaume Cizeron; (Note: Guillaume Cizeron won five championship titles while partnered with Gabriella Papadakis (2015–16, 2018–19, 2022), and one with Laurence Fournier Beaudry (2026).)	6	2015–16; 2018–19; 2022; 2026	
Ice dance	(Soviet Union); Lyudmila Pakhomova; Aleksandr Gorshkov	6	1970–74; 1976	

== Cumulative medal count ==
- Countries or entities that can no longer participate for whatever reason are indicated in italics with a dagger (†).

Total number of World Championship medals by nation
Rank	Nation	Gold	Silver	Bronze	Total
1	United States	64	65	85	214
2	Soviet Union †	44	42	24	110
3	Austria	36	46	34	116
4	Canada	36	40	39	115
5	Russia † (Note: Skaters from Russia have been banned from competing at all international skating events since 2022 due to the 2022 Russian invasion of Ukraine.)	33	26	27	86
6	Great Britain	28	30	25	83
7	Japan	19	22	16	57
8	Germany	17	21	21	59
9	France	17	19	19	55
10	Sweden	15	7	11	33
11	Hungary	13	7	15	35
12	East Germany †	12	16	12	40
13	Norway	10	2	5	17
14	Czechoslovakia †	9	5	5	19
15	China	8	11	9	28
16	West Germany †	6	12	7	25
17	Switzerland	4	2	2	8
18	Netherlands	4	1	3	8
19	Finland	3	5	3	11
20	Italy	3	4	9	16
21	FSR † (Note: In 2021, in accordance with a ban by the World Anti-Doping Agency and a decision by the Court of Arbitration for Sport, skaters from Russia were not permitted to use the Russian name, flag, or anthem; they instead participated under the name and modified flag of the Figure Skating Federation of Russia (FSR).)	3	1	2	6
22	CIS † (Note: The Commonwealth of Independent States (CIS) was formed following the dissolution of the Soviet Union in 1991.)	3	1	1	5
23	South Korea	2	4	3	9
24	Belgium	2	1	3	6
25	Bulgaria	2	1	1	4
26	Spain	2	0	2	4
27	Ukraine	1	0	2	3
28	Czech Republic	1	0	0	1
29	Kazakhstan	0	3	1	4
30	Georgia	0	1	0	1
31	Poland	0	0	2	2
32	Israel	0	0	1	1
32	Lithuania	0	0	1	1
Totals (33 entries)		397	395	390	1,182
