= Opika von Méray Horváth =

Hungarian figure skater

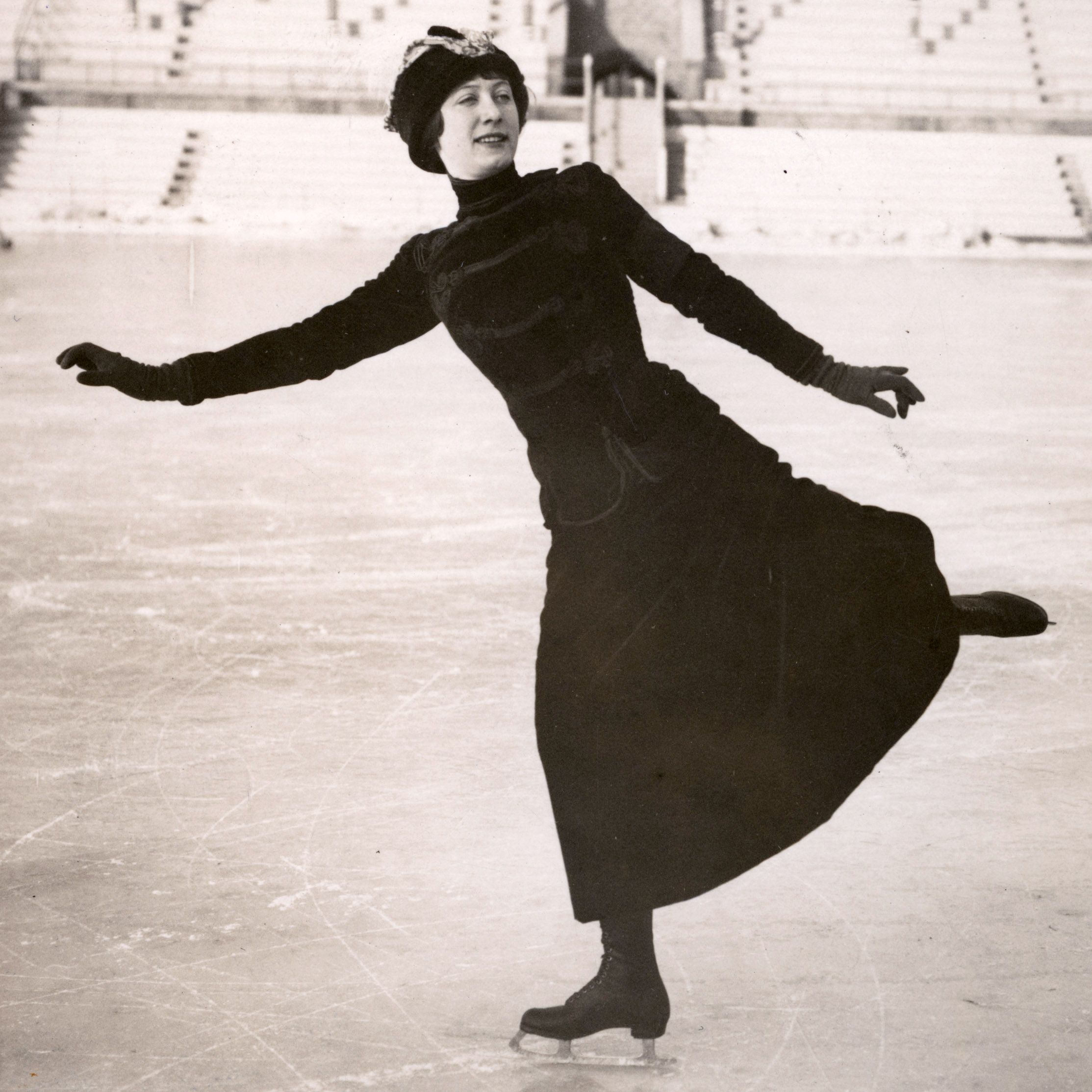
- Méray Horváth at the 1913 Nordic Games

Personal information
- Born: December 30, 1889 Arad, Austro-Hungarian Empire
- Died: April 25, 1977 (aged 87) Budapest, Hungary

Figure skating career
- Country: Hungary
- Retired: 1914
Medal record
Representing Hungary
Ladies' Figure skating
World Championships
Gold medal – first place	1914 St. Moritz	Ladies' singles
Gold medal – first place	1913 Stockholm	Ladies' singles
Gold medal – first place	1912 Davos	Ladies' singles
Silver medal – second place	1911 Vienna	Ladies' singles

Opika von Méray Horváth (December 30, 1889 – April 25, 1977), a.k.a. Zsófia Méray-Horváth, was a Hungarian figure skater. She won three consecutive World titles (1912–1914).

== Biography ==
Méray Horváth was born in Arad in 1889. She began skating in Budapest Skating Club (Budapesti Korcsolyázó Egylet). She is the second top level female Hungarian skater, after Lily Kronberger.

In World Figure Skating Championships in Vienna in 1911, Méray Horváth placed second behind Kronberger; in the next three years, she won consecutive gold medals. World War I ended her career.

She later worked as a language teacher and died in Budapest in 1977.

== Results ==
Event	1911	1912	1913	1914
World Championships	2nd	1st	1st	1st
