= 1909 World Figure Skating Championships =

Annual figure skating competition held in 1909

- Type: ISU Championship
- Season: 1909
- Location: Stockholm, Sweden (men and pairs) (Kingdom of Hungary) Budapest, Austria-Hungary (ladies)

Champions
- Men's singles: (Sweden) Ulrich Salchow
- Ladies' singles: (Kingdom of Hungary) Lily Kronberger
- Pairs: (United Kingdom) Phyllis Johnson / James H. Johnson
- Previous: 1908 World Championships
- Next: 1910 World Championships

The World Figure Skating Championships is an annual figure skating competition sanctioned by the International Skating Union in which figure skaters compete for the title of World Champion.

Men's competitions took place on 7–8 February in Stockholm, Sweden. Ladies' competitions took place on 23–24 January in Budapest, Austria-Hungary. Lily Kronberger was the only competitor. Pairs' competition took place on 8 February in Stockholm, Sweden.

== Results ==
=== Men ===
Rank	Name	Points	Places
1	(Sweden) Ulrich Salchow	413.0	7
2	(Sweden) Per Thorén	407.5	10
3	(Austrian Empire) Ernst Herz	388.1	16
4	(Sweden) Richard Johansson		20
5	(Russian Empire) Fedor Datlin		22

Judges:

- (German Empire) Georg Helfrich
- (Sweden) Edward Hörle
- (Sweden) O. Sampe
- (Russian Empire) Rudolf Sundgrén
- (Norway) O. C. Thorstensen

=== Ladies ===
The only competitor was the 19 years old (Kingdom of Hungary) Lily Kronberger and won the gold medal. Her results were the followings: CF=769, FS=513, Total=1282, Points: 256.4. The referee was (Kingdom of Hungary) Imre Szent-Györgyi.
Judges:

- (Austrian Empire) Carl Fillunger
- (German Empire) Georg Helfrich
- (Sweden) Edward Hörle
- (German Empire) Ludwig Niedermeyer
- (German Empire) Oskar Uhlig

=== Pairs ===
Rank	Name	Points	Places
1	(United Kingdom) Phyllis Johnson / James Johnson	116	5.5
2	(Sweden) Valborg Lindahl / Nils Rosenius	111	9.5
3	(Sweden) Gertrud Ström / Richard Johansson	94	16
4	(Norway) Mimi Grømer / Karl Erikson		22
5	(Norway) Alexia Schøien / Yngvar Bryn	19/27	22

Judges:

- (Sweden) August Anderberg
- (German Empire) Georg Helfrich
- (Sweden) Otto Petterson
- (Russian Empire) Rudolf Sundgren
- (Norway) O. C. Thorstensen, he voted the top two couples exactly the same (each 1.5) and the other three couples also exactly the same (each 4).

== Sources ==
- 01.011909 Suomen Urheilulehti no 4 (page 153)
