= 1912 World Figure Skating Championships =

Annual figure skating competition held in 1912

- Type: ISU Championship
- Season: 1912
- Location: (United Kingdom) Manchester, UK (men and pairs); Davos, Switzerland (ladies)

Champions
- Men's singles: (Austrian Empire) Fritz Kachler
- Ladies' singles: (Kingdom of Hungary) Zsófia Méray-Horváth
- Pairs: (United Kingdom) Phyllis Johnson / James Johnson
- Previous: 1911 World Championships
- Next: 1913 World Championships

The World Figure Skating Championships is an annual figure skating competition sanctioned by the International Skating Union in which figure skaters compete for the title of World Champion.

Men's competitions took place from 16 to 17 February in Manchester, United Kingdom. Ladies' competitions took place from 27 to 28 January in Davos, Switzerland. Pairs' competition took place on 27 February also in Manchester, United Kingdom.

== Medal table ==
* Host nations (Switzerland, Great Britain)

Rank	Nation	Gold	Silver	Bronze	Total
1	Great Britain*	1	1	1	3
2	Hungary	1	0	1	2
3	Austria	1	0	0	1
4	Germany	0	1	0	1
4	Russia	0	1	0	1
6	Norway	0	0	1	1
Totals (6 entries)		3	3	3	9

== Results ==
=== Men ===
Rank	Name	Places
1	(Austrian Empire) Fritz Kachler	8
2	(German Empire) Werner Rittberger	16
3	(Kingdom of Hungary) Andor Szende	18
4	(Sweden) Harald Rooth	28
5	(United Kingdom) Arthur Cumming	36
6	(Sweden) Dunbar Poole	41

Judges:

- (Switzerland) H. Günther
- (German Empire) Georg Helfrich
- (United Kingdom) E. S. Hirst
- (France) Louis Magnus
- (Kingdom of Hungary) Jenő Minich
- (United Kingdom) Horatio Torromé
- (United Kingdom) Herbert Yglesias

=== Ladies ===
Rank	Name	CF		FS		Total	Points	Places
1	(Kingdom of Hungary) Zsófia Méray-Horváth	1	688.25	1	497.5	1185.75	237.15	7
2	(United Kingdom) Dorothy Greenhough-Smith	4	626.25	4	450.0	1076.25	215.25	14
3	(United Kingdom) Phyllis Johnson	3	632.25	5	437.5	1069.75	213.95	18
4	(United Kingdom) Gwendolyn Lycett	2	643.75	6	422.5	1066.25	213.25	18
5	(German Empire) Grete Strasilla	5	566.5	2	465.0	1031.5	203.6	20
6	(Austrian Empire) Mizzi Wellenreiter	6	528.5	3	452.5	981.0	196.2	28
7	(Russian Empire) Ludowika Jakobsson-Eilers	7	504.0	7	367.5	871.5	174.3	35

Judges:

- (Switzerland) P. Birum
- (Austrian Empire) Josef Fellner
- (United Kingdom) Keiller Greig
- (Switzerland) H. Günther
- (France) Louis Magnus

=== Pairs ===
Rank	Name	Places
1	(United Kingdom) Phyllis Johnson / James Johnson	8.5
2	(Russian Empire) Ludowika Jakobsson-Eilers / Walter Jakobsson	10
3	(Norway) Alexia Bryn-Schøien / Yngvar Bryn	14
4	(German Empire) Hedwig Winzer / Hugo Winzer	20
5	(France) Anita del Monte / Louis Magnus	25.5
6	(United Kingdom) Enid Harrison / Basil Williams	29
7	(United Kingdom) A. Cadogan / Arthur Cumming	36
8	(United Kingdom) Louise Lovett / Ernest Worsley	37

Judges:

- (Switzerland) H. Günther
- (German Empire) Georg Helfrich
- (Kingdom of Hungary) Jenő Minich
- (United Kingdom) Horatio Torromé
- (United Kingdom) Herbert Yglesias
