= 1910 World Figure Skating Championships =

Annual figure skating competition held in 1910

- Type: ISU Championship
- Season: 1910
- Location: Davos, Switzerland (men); Berlin, German Empire (ladies and pairs)

Champions
- Men's singles: (Sweden) Ulrich Salchow
- Ladies' singles: (Kingdom of Hungary) Lily Kronberger
- Pairs: (German Empire) Anna Hübler / Heinrich Burger
- Previous: 1909 World Championships
- Next: 1911 World Championships

The World Figure Skating Championships is an annual figure skating competition sanctioned by the International Skating Union in which figure skaters compete for the title of World Champion.

Men's competitions took place from January 29 to 30 in Davos, Switzerland. Ladies' competition took place on February 4 in Berlin, German Empire. There were only two competitors. Pairs' competition took place on February 4 also in Berlin, German Empire.

== Results ==
=== Men ===
Rank	Name	Points	Places
1	(Sweden) Ulrich Salchow	334	11
2	(German Empire) Werner Rittberger	323.21	14
3	(Kingdom of Hungary) Andor Szende	302.36	20
4	(Sweden) Per Thorén	302.36	25

Judges:

- (Switzerland) P. Birum
- (United Kingdom) H. D. Faith
- (Austrian Empire) Ludwig Fänner
- (Kingdom of Hungary) Tibor Földváry
- (Switzerland) H. Günther
- (Switzerland) M. Holtz
- (Austrian Empire) Guido Kupka

=== Ladies ===
Rank	Name	Places
1	(Kingdom of Hungary) Lily Kronberger	5
2	(German Empire) Elsa Rendschmidt	10

Judges:

- (German Empire) Gilbert Fuchs
- (German Empire) Fritz Hellmund
- (German Empire) O. Hüttig
- (German Empire) F. Otto
- (German Empire) Otto Schöning

=== Pairs ===
Rank	Name	Places
1	(German Empire) Anna Hübler / Heinrich Burger	8.5
2	(German Empire) Ludowika Eilers / Walter Jakobsson	14
3	(United Kingdom) Phyllis Johnson / James Johnson	19.5

Judges:

- (German Empire) K. Eberhardt
- (German Empire) Fritz Hellmund
- (German Empire) O. Hüttig
- (German Empire) P. Kersten
- (German Empire) F. Otto
- (German Empire) Max Rendschmidt
- (German Empire) Otto Schöning

== Sources ==
- 01.02.1910 Suomen Urheilulehti no 3. page 76
