= Phyllis Johnson =

British figure skater

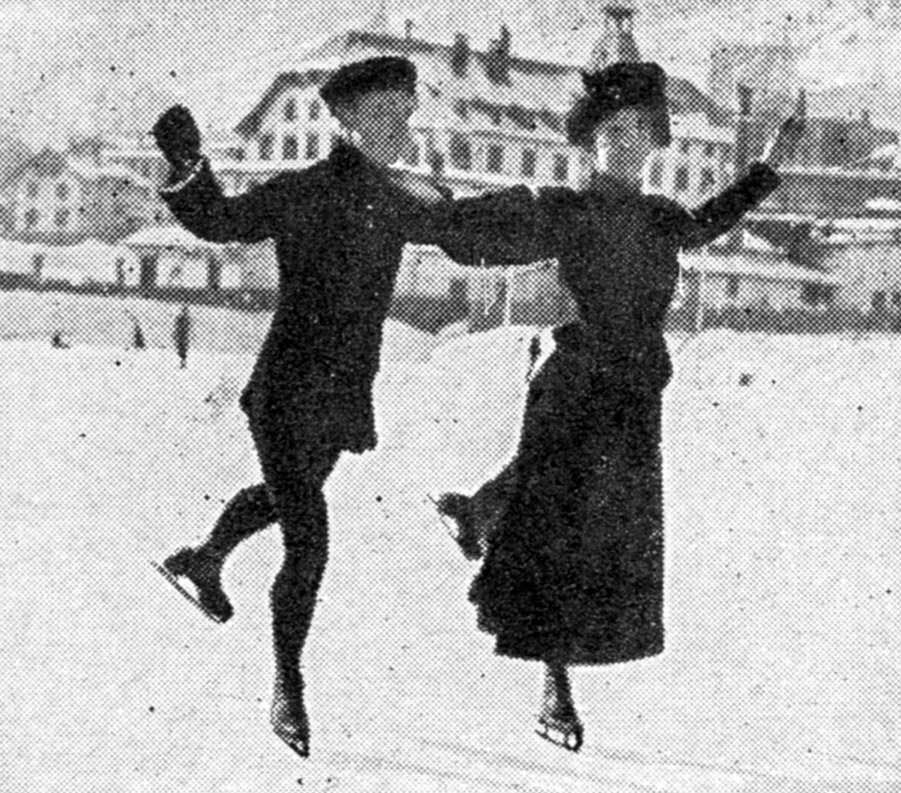
- Johnson with James H. Johnson

Personal information
- Born: 8 December 1886
- Died: 2 December 1967 (aged 80)

Figure skating career
- Country: United Kingdom
Medal record
Representing United Kingdom
Ladies' Figure skating
World Championships
Bronze medal – third place	1914 St. Moritz	Ladies' singles
Silver medal – second place	1913 Stockholm	Ladies' singles
Bronze medal – third place	1912 Davos	Ladies' singles
Pairs Figure skating
Olympic Games
Bronze medal – third place	1920 Antwerp	Pairs
Silver medal – second place	1908 London	Pairs
World Championships
Gold medal – first place	1912 Manchester	Pairs
Bronze medal – third place	1910 Berlin	Pairs
Gold medal – first place	1909 Stockholm	Pairs

Phyllis Wyatt Johnson (née Squire; 8 December 1886 – 2 December 1967) was a British figure skater.

She won the silver medal in pair skating at the 1908 Summer Olympics with James H. Johnson. They captured the gold at the World Figure Skating Championships in 1909 and 1912. In 1920, she won the bronze at the Olympics with new partner Basil Williams, becoming one of the oldest figure skating Olympic medalists. That year, she also finished fourth in ladies' singles.

== Competitive highlights ==
=== Ladies' singles ===
Event	1912	1913	1914	1920	1921
Winter Olympic Games				4th	
World Championships	3rd	2nd	3rd		
British Championships					1st*

*Coed

=== Pairs ===
(with James H. Johnson)

Event	1908	1909	1910	1912
Summer Olympic Games	2nd			
World Championships	2nd	1st	3rd	1st

(with Basil Williams)

Event	1920
Summer Olympic Games	3rd
