= Maria Jelinek =

Canadian figure skater

Personal information
- Born: Maria Jelínková; November 16, 1942 (age 83) Prague, Protectorate of Bohemia and Moravia
- Height: 5 ft 7.5 in (171 cm)

Figure skating career
- Country: Canada
- Skating club: Oakville Skating Club
- Retired: 1962
Medal record
Figure skating – Pairs
Representing Canada
World Championships
Gold medal – first place	1962 Prague	Pairs
Silver medal – second place	1960 Vancouver	Pairs
Bronze medal – third place	1958 Paris	Pairs
Bronze medal – third place	1957 Colorado Springs	Pairs
North American Championships
Gold medal – first place	1961 Philadelphia	Pairs
Silver medal – second place	1957 Rochester	Pairs

Maria Jelinek (birth name Maria Jelínková; born November 16, 1942) is a Canadian former pair skater. With her brother Otto, she is the 1962 World champion, the 1961 North American champion, and 1961–1962 Canadian national champion. They represented Canada at the 1960 Winter Olympics, where they placed 4th.

== Personal life ==
The Jelinek family fled to Canada from Czechoslovakia in 1948 at the beginning of the Cold War.

The Czechoslovak government withdrew their citizenship in 1961.

Maria Jelinek currently resides in Oakville, Ontario.

Otto died on September 5, 2026.

== Career ==
The Jelineks trained at the Oakville Skating Club. In 1955, they became the Canadian national champions at the junior level and took silver at the senior level the following year. In 1957, the pair won the silver medal at the North American Championships and the first of their four World Championship medals, a bronze. After taking bronze again in 1958, they finished just off the World podium in 1959 and then won silver in 1960. They placed fourth at the 1960 Winter Olympics held at Squaw Valley near Lake Tahoe, California. Preparing for the Olympic competition, the Jelineks put together a complex and difficult routine involving several lifts, lasting five minutes. Shortly before their trip to Squaw Valley, they still struggled to complete their routine. Their coaches asked for help from Wilfrid Shute, MD, cardiologist and prominent advocate for vitamin E nutrition. Dr. Shute's daughter also trained at the Oakville Skating Club and had the same coaches as did the Jelineks. Dr. Shute prescribed 1600 international units of vitamin E daily for the Jelineks. That enabled them to complete their routine easily and perform it at Squaw Valley — at 6,200 feet (1,900 meters) elevation— without resorting to oxygen masks.

After placing second four times, the Jelineks won their first Canadian senior title in 1961. The pair had a bad fall a day before the North American Championships, resulting in a concussion to Otto and a large gash in Maria's thigh, however, they competed and won gold. They decided to compete at the 1961 World Championships to be hosted by Prague, despite the risk to citizens who had fled. After the International Skating Union threatened to change the host, the Czechoslovak government resolved the dispute by stripping the pair's citizenship. The competition, however, was cancelled due to the Sabena Flight 548 crash which killed the entire U.S. team. The Jelineks had planned to travel with the Americans to Prague but missed the flight because they were waiting for their coach, Bruce Hyland, whose wife was about to give birth.

The Jelineks won the national title again in 1962 and went on to win gold at the 1962 World Championships in their city of birth.

Although Maria Jelinek was tall for a pair skater, at 5' 7 1/2", they were the first pair to perform lifts with several rotations. They also performed side-by-side double jumps.

The Jelineks retired from competition later in 1962, and toured professionally with Ice Capades. They were inducted into Canada's Sports Hall of Fame in 1962 and into the Skate Canada Hall of Fame in 1994.

== Results ==
with Otto Jelinek

Results
International
Event	1955	1956	1957	1958	1959	1960	1961	1962
Winter Olympics						4th		
World Championships			3rd	3rd	4th	2nd		1st
North American Champ.			2nd				1st	
National
Canadian Championships	1st J.	2nd	2nd	2nd		2nd	1st	1st
J. = Junior level
