= Gertrud Ström =

Swedish figure skater

Figure skating career
- Country: Sweden
Medal record
Representing Sweden
Figure skating: Pairs
World Championships
Bronze medal – third place	1909 Stockholm	Pairs

Gertrud Ström was a Swedish figure skater who competed in pair skating. With partner Richard Johansson, she won the bronze medal at the 1909 World Figure Skating Championships.

== Competitive highlights ==
With Richard Johansson

Event	1909
World Championships	3rd
