= James H. Johnson (figure skater) =

British figure skater

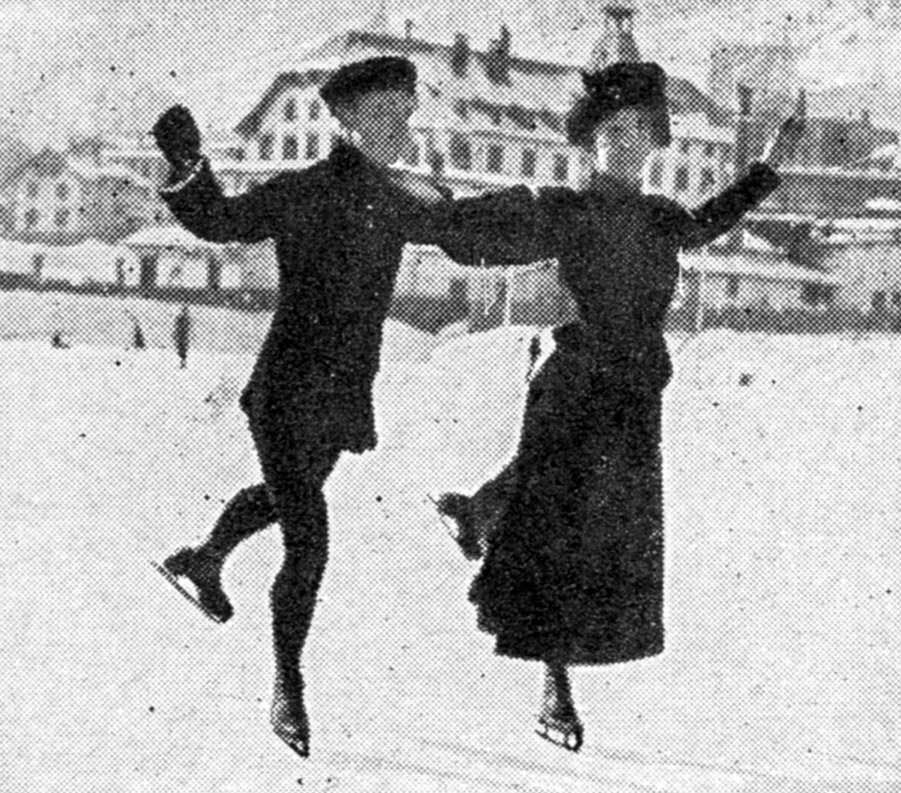
- Johnson with Phyllis Johnson

Personal information
- Born: 1874
- Died: 15 November 1921

Figure skating career
- Country: United Kingdom
Medal record
Representing United Kingdom
Pairs Figure skating
Olympic Games
Silver medal – second place	1908 London	Pairs
World Championships
Gold medal – first place	1912 Manchester	Pairs
Bronze medal – third place	1910 Berlin	Pairs
Gold medal – first place	1909 Stockholm	Pairs

Olympic medal record

Figure skating
Silver medal – second place	1908 London	Pairs

James Henry Johnson (1874 – 15 November 1921) was a British pair skater competitive during the early days of modern figure skating. He and partner Phyllis Johnson won the silver medal at the 1908 Summer Olympics, the first Olympics to include figure skating events.

The Johnsons also participated in the first official World Figure Skating Championships pairs' competition, placing second behind Anna Hübler and Heinrich Burger of Germany. The Johnsons finished first in 1909, third in 1910, and first again in 1912.

== Results ==
(with Phyllis Johnson)

Event	1908	1909	1910	1912
Summer Olympic Games	2nd			
World Championships	2nd	1st	3rd	1st
