= Werner Rittberger =

German figure skater

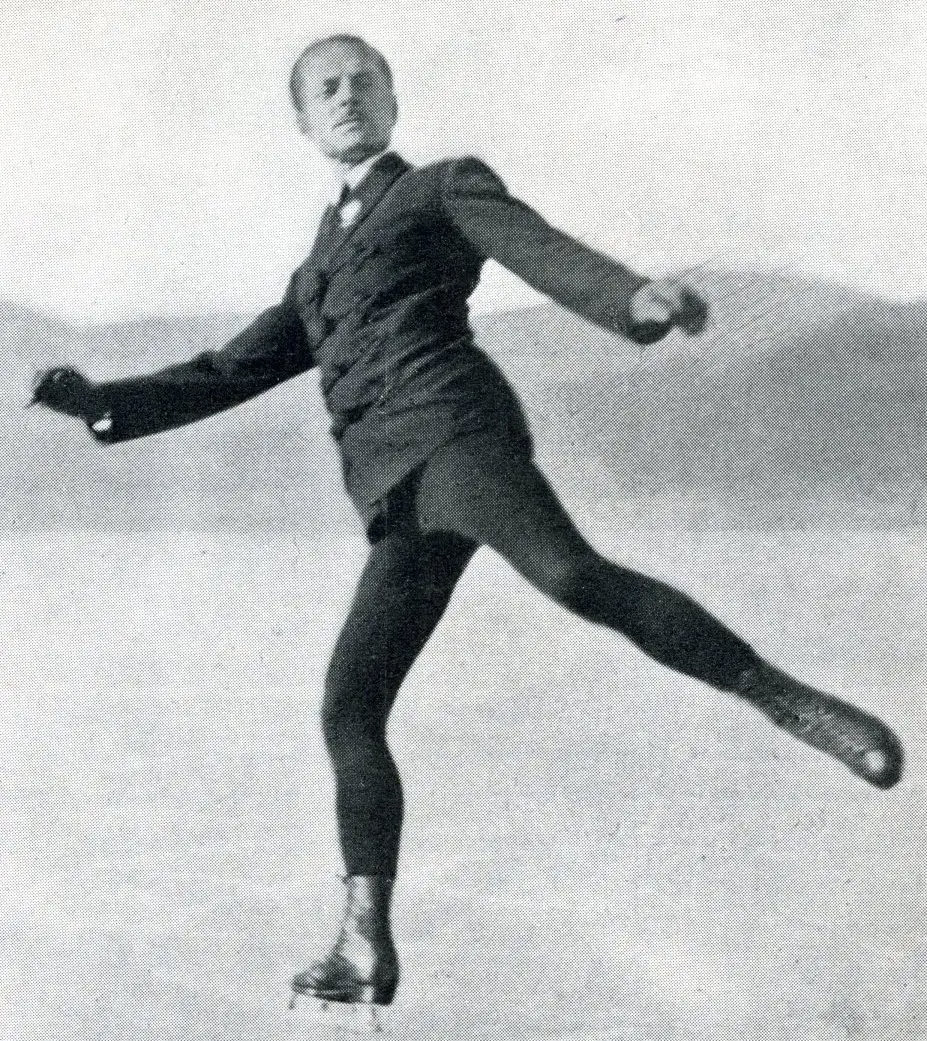
- Rittberger in 1932

Personal information
- Born: 13 July 1891 Potsdam, German Empire
- Died: 12 August 1975 (aged 84) Krefeld, West Germany

Figure skating career
- Country: Germany
Medal record
Representing Germany
Men's Figure skating
World Championships
Silver medal – second place	1912 Manchester	Men's singles
Silver medal – second place	1911 Troppau	Men's singles
Silver medal – second place	1910 Davos	Men's singles
European Championships
Silver medal – second place	1925 Triberg	Men's singles
Bronze medal – third place	1924 Davos	Men's singles
Bronze medal – third place	1911 St. Petersburg	Men's singles
Silver medal – second place	1910 Berlin	Men's singles

Werner Rittberger (born 13 July 1891 in Potsdam; died 12 August 1975 in Krefeld) was a German figure skater. Rittberger invented the Loop jump in 1910, also known as a "Rittberger".

Rittberger was born in Potsdam. His talent for skating was discovered after he won a speed skating competition. In 1911, he married his first wife, Babette Hewald, with whom he had a son and three daughters.

He won the German Nationals eleven times between 1911 and 1928, and the silver medal at the World Figure Skating Championships in 1910, 1911, and 1912. He skated for the Berliner SC club representing Germany.

During World War I, he was drafted. He initially fought as an infantryman and then trained to be a reconnaissance pilot for the Luftstreitkräfte. After the war, he resumed training in figure skating. In 1921, after the death of his first wife, he remarried to Friedl Evertz in 1921. They had a son together but divorced after three years.

Rittberger competed at the 1928 Winter Olympics; however, he withdrew after the compulsory figures, citing stomach cramps. After this, he ended his amateur career and worked as a coach and journalist in Berlin until 1930, when he moved to Canada. In 1931, he joined the Lake Placid Club as a coach and then moved to the Toronto Skating Club. He returned to Germany in 1934.

He was a member of the Nazi Luftwaffe during World War II and served as the commander of several airfields. After the war, he became a figure skating coach in Krefeld, at first unpaid and then later for a small pension, and served as a judge. In 1955, he published a book on skating, and he also worked as a journalist for the Deutsche Presse-Agentur.

His students included Ina Bauer, Ria Baran, and Paul Falk.

Rittberger developed dementia in his later years. He died on 12 August 1975, and was buried next to his first wife in Berlin.

== Results ==
Event	1910	1911	1912	1913	1920	1921	1922	1923	1924	1925	1926	1927	1928
Winter Olympic Games													WD
World Championships	2nd	2nd	2nd	7th							4th		
European Championships	2nd	3rd					4th		3rd	2nd			
German Championships		1st	1st	1st	1st	1st	1st	1st	1st	1st	1st	2nd	1st

== Sources ==
- DEV 1890-1990, book
- Werner Rittberger at Sports Reference
- Der Eissport, 1922, No. 1
