= Walter Jakobsson =

Finnish figure skater

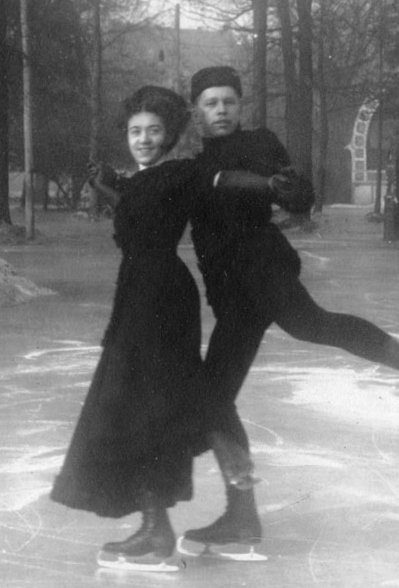
- Ludowika and Walter Jakobsson

Personal information
- Born: 6 February 1882 Helsinki, Finland
- Died: 10 June 1957 (aged 75) Zurich, Switzerland

Figure skating career
- Country: Finland; German Empire (1910–1911)
- Retired: 1928
Medal record
Representing Finland
Olympic Games
Silver medal – second place	1924 Chamonix	Pairs
Gold medal – first place	1920 Antwerp	Pairs
World Championships
Gold medal – first place	1923 Oslo	Pairs
Silver medal – second place	1922 Davos	Pairs
Gold medal – first place	1914 St. Moritz	Pairs
Silver medal – second place	1913 Stockholm	Pairs
Silver medal – second place	1912 Manchester	Pairs
Representing German Empire
World Championships
Gold medal – first place	1911 Vienna	Pairs
Silver medal – second place	1910 Berlin	Pairs

Walter Andreas Jakobsson (6 February 1882 – 10 June 1957) was a Finnish figure skater, and the oldest figure skating Olympic champion (at age 38). As a single skater, he won the Finnish national championship in 1910 and 1911. In 1910, he partnered with German figure skater Ludowika Eilers. As pairs skaters, they won the World Championship in 1911, 1914, and 1923, and the Olympic gold in 1920. They finished second at the 1924 Olympics and fifth in 1928.

Jakobsson studied engineering in Berlin, where he met Eilers in 1907. They married in 1911, and in 1916 moved to Helsinki, where Jakobsson got a job of the technical director of Kone OY (now Konecranes), a leading manufacturers of cranes. He held that post until retiring in 1947. He was also an amateur photographer and member of the Fotografiamatörklubben i Helsingfors (Helsinki Amateur Photography Club). His specialty was dark city scenes with special light effects like rain or mist.

== Results ==
=== Pairs with Ludowika Jakobsson-Eilers ===
Event	1910	1911	1912	1913	1914	1919	1920	1921	1922	1923	1924	1928
Winter Olympics							1st				2nd	5th
World Championships	2nd	1st	2nd	2nd	1st				2nd	1st		
Nordic Championships						1st		1st				
Finnish Championships		1st						1st				

=== Men's singles ===
Event	1910	1911
Finnish Championships	1st	1st
