= Andor Szende =

Hungarian figure skater

Personal information
- Born: Szende Andor; 14 April 1886 Budapest, Austria-Hungary
- Died: 22 May 1972 (aged 86) Budapest, Hungarian People's Republic

Figure skating career
- Country: Hungary
- Coach: Seiberth
Medal record
Representing Hungary
Men's figure skating
World Championships
Bronze medal – third place	1910 Davos	Men
Bronze medal – third place	1912 Manchester	Men
Bronze medal – third place	1913 Vienna	Men
European Championships
Silver medal – second place	1913 Kristiania	Men

Andor Szende (14 April 1886 – 22 May 1972) was a Hungarian figure skater who competed in men's singles. He was later a coach and architect.

He won bronze medals in men's single skating at three World Figure Skating Championships: in 1910, 1912, and 1913.

He won the 1908 Hungarian junior national championships, and the men's senior singles on four occasions: 1911, 1912, 1914 and 1922. He was coached by Seiberth, from Bosnia, who worked in Budapest.

Szende excelled in a number of sports, including athletics, tennis, speed skating and sports shooting. Later, he worked as a coach and a tour guide. His fate during the Holocaust is unknown, but he survived until 1972. He is buried at the Kozma Street Jewish Cemetery in Budapest.

== Competitive highlights ==
Event	1910	1911	1912	1913	1914	1922
World Championships	3rd	4th	3rd	3rd	5th	
European Championships		5th		2nd		
Hungarian Championships	2nd	1st	1st		1st	1st
