= Richard Johansson =

Swedish figure skater

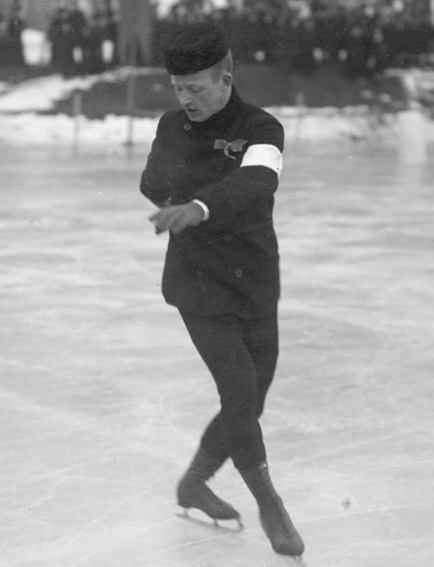
- Richard Johansson in 1908

Personal information
- Born: 18 June 1882
- Died: 24 July 1952 (aged 70)

Figure skating career
- Country: Sweden
Medal record
Representing Sweden
Men's Figure skating
Olympic Games
Silver medal – second place	1908 London	Men's singles
Pairs Figure skating
World Championships
Bronze medal – third place	1909 Stockholm	Pairs

Richard Johansson (18 June 1882 – 24 July 1952) was a Swedish figure skater. He won the silver medal in the men's singles competition at the 1908 London Olympics. He was part of the Swedish medal sweep there. He also skated in pairs with Gertrud Ström and won the bronze at the 1909 World Championships.

== Results ==
=== Men's singles ===
Event	1904	1905	1906	1907	1908	1909	1910	1911	1912	1913	1914
Winter Olympics					2nd						
World Championships		4th				4th		5th			9th
European Championships										5th	
Swedish Championships	1st		3rd	2nd	1st	1st	1st				

=== Pairs ===
(with Ström)

Event	1909
World Championships	3rd
