= History of figure skating =

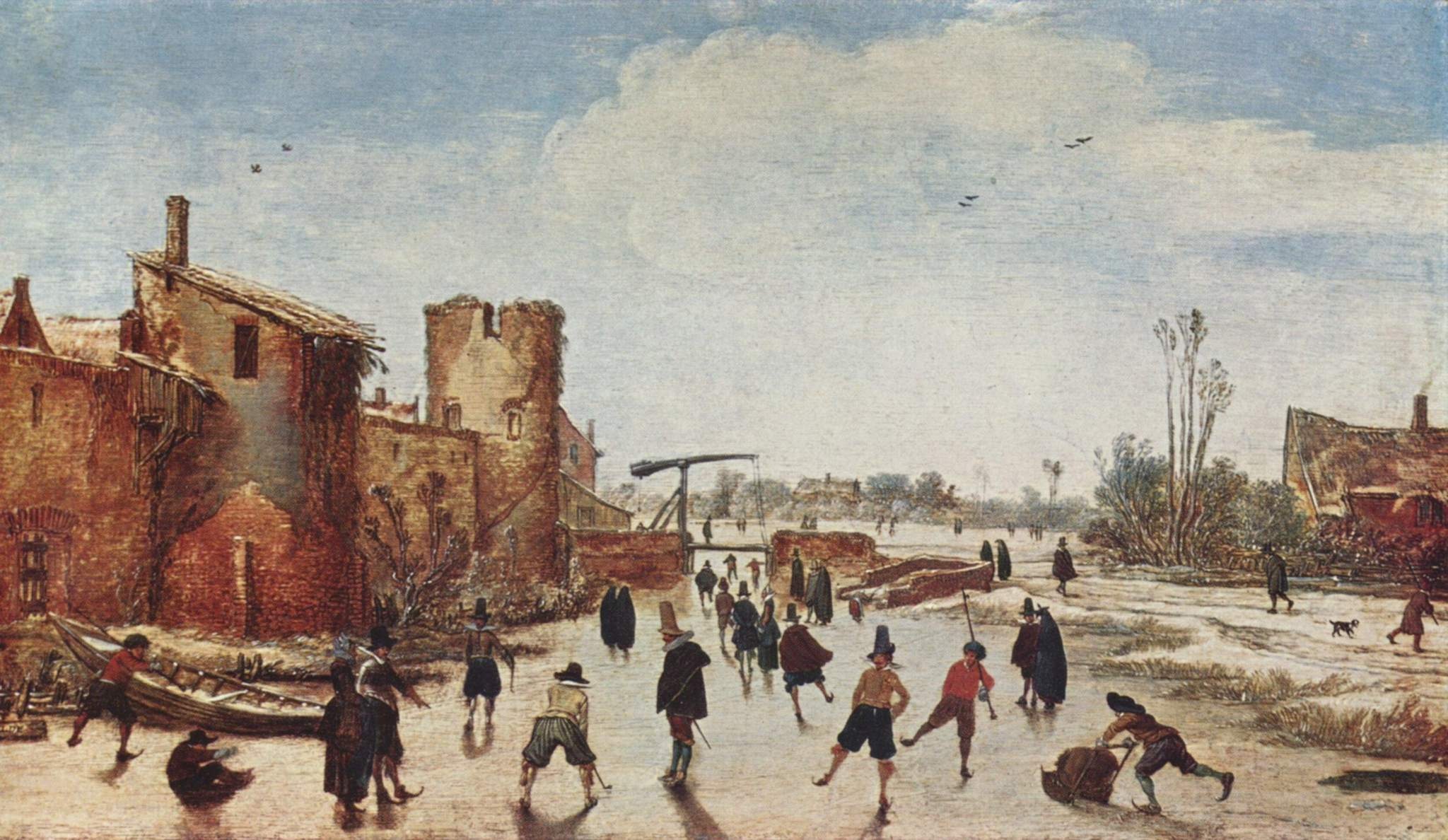
A Medieval scene of ice skating, painted by Esaias van de Velde

The history of figure skating stretches back to prehistoric times. Primitive ice skates appear in the archaeological record from about 3000 BC. Edges were added by the Dutch in the 13th and 14th century. International figure skating competitions began appearing in the late 19th century; in 1891, the European Championships were inaugurated in Hamburg, Germany, and in 1896, the first World Championship was held in Saint Petersburg, Russian Empire. At the 1908 Summer Olympics in London, England, figure skating became the first winter sport to be included in the Olympics.

== Archaeology and earliest historical documentation ==
The exact time and process by which humans first learned to ice skate is unknown. Primitive animal bone ice skates have been found in Scandinavia and Russia, some dating back to about 3000 BC. In the ancient world, ice skating was a form of transportation; as figure skating historian James R. Hines put it, passage over frozen surfaces "was a necessity for survival during harsh winter months".

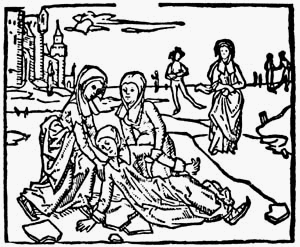
Lidwina's fall, a 1498 woodcut.

The Prose Edda (c. 1220) included mentions of ice skating. The earliest clear, written mention of ice skating is found in a book written in the 12th century by William Fitzstephen, a monk in Canterbury. In the work, centered on Thomas Becket, he describes a scene taking place below the northern city walls of Canterbury during the winter:

...if the moors in Finsbury and Moorfield freeze over, children from London play. Some of the children have attached bones to their ankles, and carry well-worn sticks. They fly across the ice like birds, or well-fired arrows. Suddenly, two children will run at each other, sticks held high in the air. They then attack each other until one falls down. Often, the children injure their heads or break their arms or legs...

The sticks that Fitzstephen refers to were used for movement, as the primitive bone-made ice skates did not have sharp gliding edges like modern ice skates. Adding edges to ice skates was invented by the Dutch in the 13th or 14th century. According to figure skating historian James R. Hines, the Dutch revolutionized ice skating in the 13th century by sharpening the blades of ice skates, which were made of steel at the time. These ice skates were made of steel, with sharpened edges on the bottom to aid movement. Around the same time period, another Dutchman, a table maker's apprentice, experimented with the height to width ratio of the metal blade of the ice skates, producing a design that remains almost unaltered to this day. The user of the skates no longer needed to use sticks for propulsion, and movement on skates was now freer and more stable.

The first depiction of ice skating in a work of art was made in the 15th century. The picture, of Saint Lidwina, patron saint of ice skaters, falling on the ice was the first work of art to feature ice skating as a main theme. Another important aspect of the painting is a man seen in the background, who is skating on one leg. This means that the ice skates the man was wearing must have sharp edges similar to those found on modern ice skates.

=== Social status of ice skating ===
In the Netherlands, ice skating was considered proper for all classes of people to participate in, as shown in many pictures by the Old Masters. Skating was used as a means of transportation because the waterways which connected Dutch towns sometimes froze for months on end, hampering the economy.

In other regions, participation in ice skating was limited to only members of the upper classes. Emperor Rudolf II of the Holy Roman Empire enjoyed ice skating so much he had a large ice carnival constructed in his court in 1610 in order to popularize the sport. King Louis XVI of France brought ice skating to Paris during his reign. Madame de Pompadour, Napoleon I, Napoleon III, and the House of Stuart were, among others, royal and upper class fans of ice skating.

== 1500s to 1800s ==
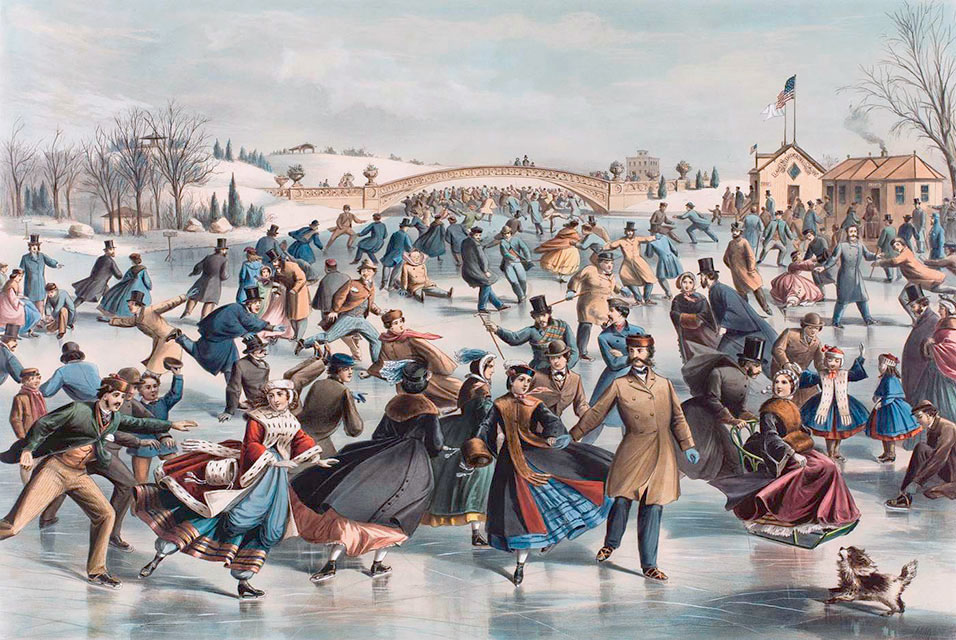
Skating in the 19th century, 1862 lithograph

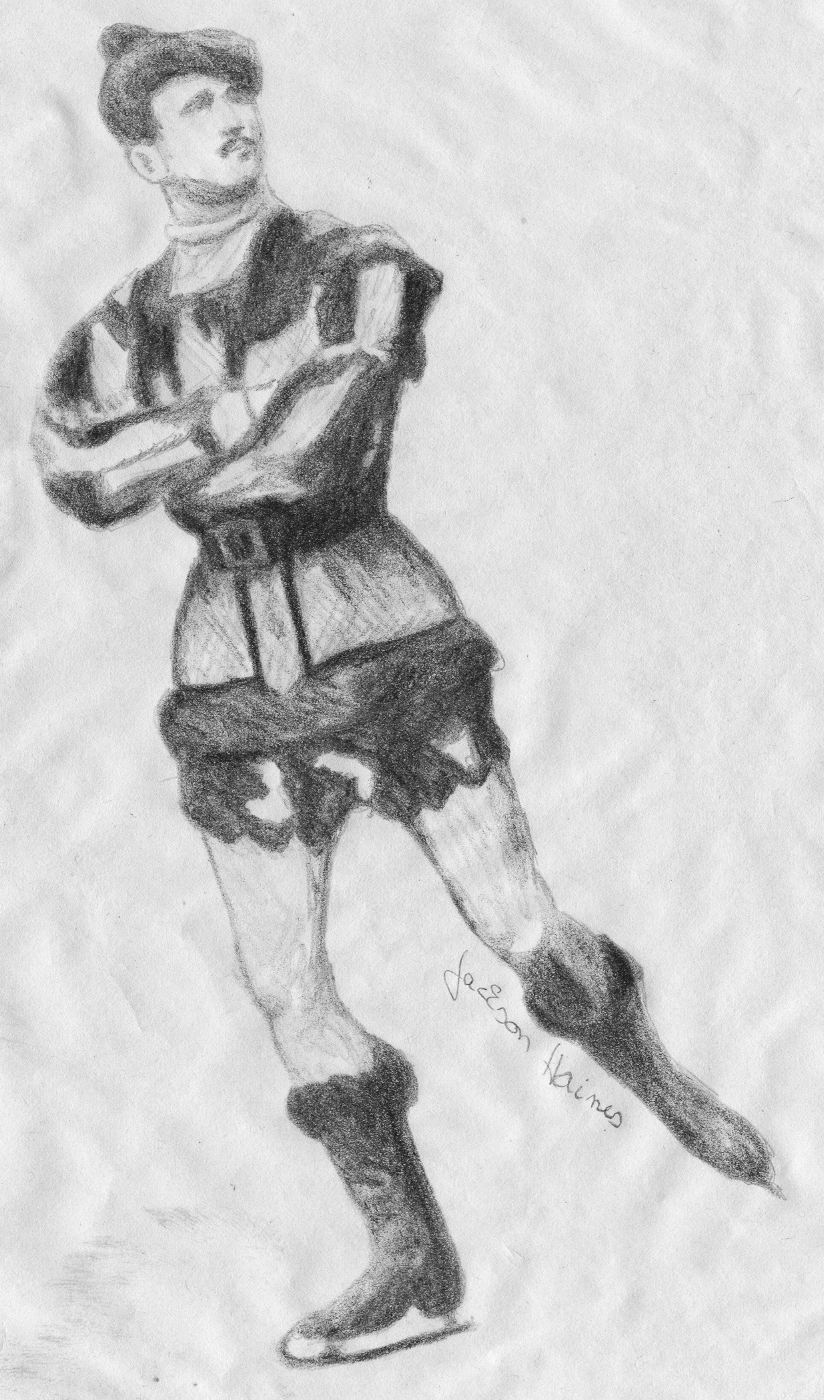
Jackson Haines

In 1572, the Dutch used ice skates during their revolt against Spain in Amsterdam. While the Spanish wore clogs with spikes to travel over the frozen sea during battles, the Dutch fought on bladed skates, which allowed them to defeat their enemy.

In 1713, bladed ice skates were used for the first time in North America. The next step in the development of ice skating came in 1744, when the first ice skating association in the world was formed, the Edinburgh Skating Club. The first instructional book concerning ice skating was published in London in 1772. The book, written by a British artillery lieutenant, Robert Jones, describes basic figure skating forms such as circles and figure eights. The book was written solely for men, as women did not normally ice skate in the late 18th century. It was with the publication of this manual that ice skating split into its two main disciplines, speed skating and figure skating.

In 1813, Jean Garcin published the first book about ice skating in France, entitled Le vrai pattineur (The True Skater). Garcin was the first to place equal importance on skating backward to skating forward, necessary for the quickly increasing figures developed during the 19th century. He also emphasized artistry over athleticism and related skating to ballet. He was a member of the Gilets Rouge (or Red Waistcoats), a French skating fraternity.

In 1830, the London Skating Club was formed; as of 2011, it was the oldest skating club still in existence. The first skating club in North America was founded in St. John, New Brunswick, in 1833. In 1849, the Philadelphia Skating Club was formed; its name was changed to the Philadelphia Skating Club and Humane Society in 1861. The club was one of the first members of the U.S. Figure Skating Association (now known as U.S. Figure Skating) and continues to exist today.

By the last 25 years of the 19th century, skating became a rapidly growing and popular sport in Canada, with clubs being founded in many cities and competitions occurring frequently within and between them. In 1888, the Amateur Skating Association, which oversaw figure skating and speed skating in Canada, was formed in Montreal. Eventually, the name of the Canadian federation was changed to Skate Canada in 2000.

George Anderson, who was the second major British writer about figure skating and president of the skating club in Glasgow for many years, wrote The Art of Skating in 1852, under the pseudonym Cyclos. At the time of the book's publication, it included a section about skating in England and Scotland during the time. A second edition was published in 1868, under Anderson's name but without the historical section, which had taken up half of the previous edition.

Edward F. Gill wrote The Skater's Manual, the first book about skating written in North America, in 1863.

In the winter of 1858–59, a skating pond opened in New York's Central Park, re-igniting interest in the activity. Sex segregation at ponds disappeared early on and skating became "one of the only activities that single men and women could do together unchaperoned." Additional skating ponds opened in Brooklyn, Hoboken, Jersey City, and Staten Island as the activity grew in popularity. The Skating Club of New York was founded in 1863. Jackson Haines, an American, was the first skater to incorporate ballet and dance movements into his skating, as opposed to focusing on tracing patterns on the ice. He also invented the sit spin and developed a shorter, curved blade for figure skating that allowed for easier turns. Haines was also the first to wear blades that were permanently attached to the boot. He won the first Championships of America held in Troy, New York in 1864.

For a time, the stiff and rigid British figure skating forms dominated in America, trumping Haines's more artistic way of skating. Haines instead attempted to spread his innovations in ice skating style in Europe, gaining success in such countries as Sweden and Austria. His style was still opposed by both his American colleagues as well as skaters from Victorian England, who continued to advocate a stiffer and more restrained style of skating. Haines continued to add new dance elements to his routines, and astounded a crowd in Vienna in the winter of 1868. Haines's performance led to the establishment of the Vienna School, which continued to develop Haines's artistic style. Although Haines himself died at the age of 35 in 1875 from the effects of tuberculosis, his influence lived on. His students at the Vienna School established the International Skating Union in 1892, the first international ice skating organization, and one of the oldest sports associations still in existence. It was founded in Scheveningen, in the Netherlands, but is now based in Lausanne, Switzerland. The Union created the first codified set of figure skating rules.

The Vienna Skating Club was formed in 1867; according to Hines, it was still in existence in 2011. Figure skating historian Nigel Brown said this about the development of figure skating in the late 1800s: "To the Viennese, skating meant primarily something to see, to the English it was something to do". For writer Ellyn Kestnbaum, not only does this distinction applies to the difference between spectator and participatory sports, it "also points to skating's perennial status as both sport and performing art".

The first time the new sport was called "figure skating" was by H.E. Vandervell and T. Maxwell Witham, in their book Figure Skating, which was published in 1869. The first attempts to make artificial ice occurred during the 1870s in England and the U.S. The first notable indoor ice rink was made in 1876, by John Gamgee, in Chelsea along the north bank of the Thames River; it measured 24 by 40 feet. By the end of the 19th century, many major cities in Europe and North America had indoor rinks. In 1879, the first artificial ice rink opened in the U.S., at Madison Square Garden in New York City. Also in 1879, the Madison Square Garden rink was the venue for the Grand Carnival, which Hines called "large and spectacular" and was one of the carnivals popular in the U.S. and Europe, especially by the Vienna Skating Club, at the time. Carnivals, beginning in the 1870s, provided opportunities for skaters of all skills and levels to present shows for their parents and families, and for the general public.

In 1879, the National Skating Association, the oldest national federation overseeing the rules of speed skating and figure skating (now known as British Ice Skating), was formed. It was organized to regulate the rules of speed skating, but figure skaters joined within a year of its forming.

The first international figure skating competition was held in Vienna in 1882; according to Kestnbaum, it established the precedence for future competitions. Sponsored by the Vienna Skating Club, competitors from Vienna came in first and second place, with Leopold Frey, who was a student of Haines', coming in second place. Axel Paulsen from Norway came in third place. Competitors were judged on 23 compulsory figures, a four-minute free skating program, and special figures.

The International Skating Union (ISU), the organization that oversees the sport of figure skating, was founded in 1892, in the Netherlands. Pim Mulier from the Netherlands was the ISU's first president. The ISU adopted the international style of skating instead of the American style and English style. The American style disappeared by World War I; the English style continued into the 21st century. According to Hines, the "English and international styles can be described by the body style employed for their figures". The English style employed a rigid body style in combined skating; the international style included more use of the skater's arms. The American style of skating, which included dancing on the ice and figures that were not tied to special figures, tended to combine the English and international styles. Grapevines, which Hines calls "a uniquely North American innovation", required skaters to keep both feet on the ice for the duration of the figure.

The first World Championships was held in 1896, in St. Petersburg, Russia. Only male skaters competed. The Cambridge Skating Club was founded in 1898. In 2011, it was one of the only outdoor natural skating facilities still in existence and was a member of U.S. Figure Skating. As Hines reports, it depended upon weather patterns; as of 2011, the club was able to provide about 30 days of skating per winter. Theresa Weld, Nathaniel Niles, Sherwin Badger, Roger Turner, Maribel Vinson, Joan Tozzer, and Bernard Fox trained there in the years before World War II.

== Early 20th century ==
In the beginning of the 20th century, figure skating was lent a more athletic character through the developments of Ulrich Salchow, a Swede. Salchow was considered the greatest figure skater of his day by far, winning the world championships ten times. The crowning achievement of his career, however, was his development of ice skates with slightly serrated blades, giving enough traction on the ice to launch long jumps. The salchow jump, still used prominently in figure skating routines today, is named for him, and was considered Salchow's greatest contribution to figure skating.

The number of carnivals increased dramatically by the early 20th century, due to increase in numbers of skating clubs, the development of artificial ice, and the increase of availability of covered and indoor ice rinks. Their heyday occurred between World War I and World War II.

Figure skating's Olympic debut came at the 1908 Summer Olympics—it was the first winter sport introduced to the Olympics. The competition included men's singles, ladies' singles, pairs, and special figures.

The largest public ice rink in the world, the Sportpalast in Berlin, opened in the 1910s. The rink had an area of 2,400 m^{2} (25,800 ft^{2}), with dimensions of 60 m by 40 m (197 ft by 131 ft). The new rink increased both the public interest in figure skating as well as the number of people who practiced the sport. Many new figure skaters came from Germany, among them Werner Rittberger and Charlotta Oelschägel. Rittberger invented another jump, at first named eponymously, but eventually changed to the name it is known by today, the loop jump. Oelschlägel won a championship in the United States at the age of 17, and had a professional career spanning ten years.

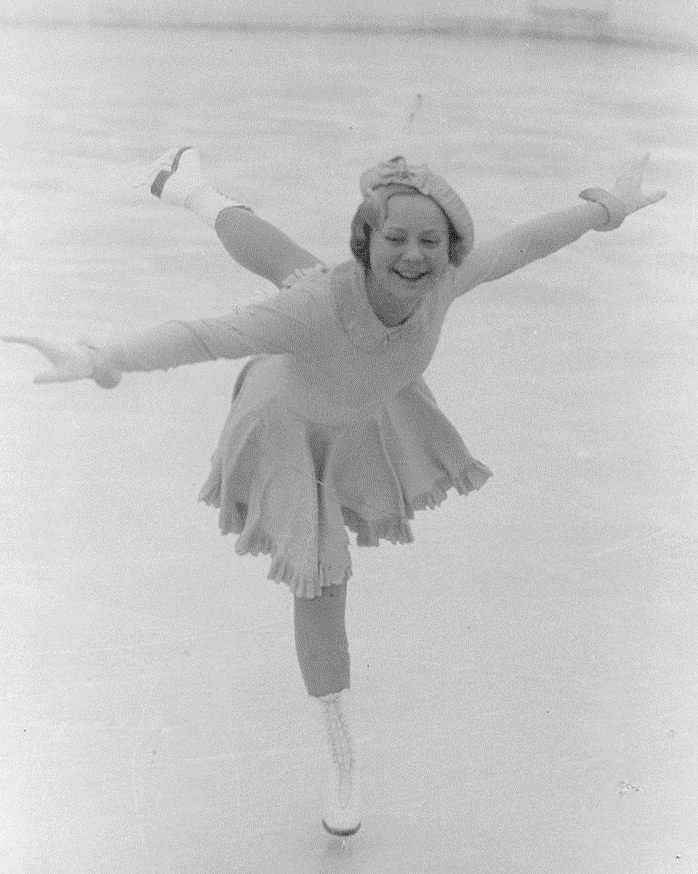
Sonja Henie, 1936

No major international championships were held from 1915 to 1921 due to World War I and the post-war recovery. In 1922, the World and European Championships were renewed and in 1924 figure skating was part of the first Winter Olympics, held in Chamonix, France. Norway's Sonja Henie and Austria's Karl Schäfer dominated the sport during the inter-war period. Henie, a ten-time world champion, brought a new style to figure skating in both athletic practice and dress. Previously, female figure skaters had skated in bulky clothing and long skirts. Henie broke with tradition by wearing a short knee-length skirt during her routines. In addition, her fluid and unlabored movements and overall elegance were considered to be a major advancement for figure skating.

In 1924, the U.S. Figure Skating Association sponsored the first of annual association-wide carnivals held for three years in New York, Boston, and Philadelphia. By that time, carnivals often featured professional and elite skaters. By the 1930s, carnivals began to dwindle in number and influence due to the formation of professional traveling ice shows, although a few have survived into the 21st century, including in Dallas, Texas, and by the Skating Club of Boston, which produced a carnival called Ice Chips, the oldest carnival in existence and presented annually since 1912.

Austrian men dominated the sport between World War I and II; collectively, Schäfer, Willy Böckl, and Fritz Kachler won 14 out of 18 World championships during those years. In the period from 1929 to 1936, Schäfer won the European title eight times and the World title seven times. Herma Szabo won the World Championships in the women's discipline five times, between 1922 and 1926. During Henie's years of domination, beginning in 1927, Fritzi Burger, Melitta Brunner, Hilde Holovsky, and Liselotte Landbeck won 11 of the 20 silver and bronze medals contested at Worlds during that time. Burger earned the silver medal during two Winter Olympics. Austrian pairs teams won 20 medals at Worlds during this time, including gold medals by Helene Engelmann and Alfred Berger in 1922 and 1924, Szabo and Ludwig Wrede in 1925 and 1927, and Lily Scholtz and Otto Kaiser in 1929.

Although the Russian Empire hosted the first World Championships and Nikolai Panin won gold in special figures at the 1908 Olympics, its successor state, the Soviet Union, was largely absent from international figure skating competitions for several decades.

== Post-World War II to present day ==
Not held from 1940 due to World War II, the European and World Championships returned in 1946. The construction of new ice rinks, built solely for ice skating, allowed much more intensive training and improved performance on the ice. This led to other changes in the sport, such as a heavier emphasis on the free skate, a move which disenchanted some spectators.

In 1952, ice dancing was added to the World Championships. It appeared at the 1968 Winter Olympics as a demonstration sport and was added as a medal sport at the 1976 Olympics.

Because of the years of war, Europe fell behind North America in terms of figure skating dominance. Many of the new top competitors came from the United States and Canada, bringing with them a style that emphasized speed, endurance, and dynamic movements. They included Americans Richard Button (who was the first skater to complete both the double Axel jump and a loop jump with three rotations), Hayes Alan Jenkins, David Jenkins, Tenley Albright, and Carol Heiss; and Canadians Barbara Ann Scott and Donald Jackson. In 1961, the crash of Sabena Flight 548 claimed the lives of the entire United States figure skating team and their coaches. The event sharply reduced American strength in the sport for a period but by the late 1960s the country began a resurgence led by Peggy Fleming.

The Soviet Union began appearing on the international scene in the late 1950s. Winning gold at the 1964 Winter Olympics, Ludmila Belousova / Oleg Protopopov began a forty-year Soviet/Russian gold medal streak in pair skating—the longest in Olympic sports history, running from 1964 to 2006. Canadian men were on the podium at the World's Championships every year between 1982 and 1997 except for one year, 1996.

1973 was the last year in which solid gold medals were awarded in figure skating. Once worth 60% of the score in single skating, compulsory figures steadily decreased in value to 20% and were eliminated from international competition after the 1989–90 season.

Skaters were able to achieve greater speed with improvements in blade sharpening and water purification (affecting ice quality). According to S. Schonmetzler, average distances traveled during a singles' long program were 1100 metres for men and 970 metres for women in 1980, growing to 1320 m and 1150 m respectively by the 1986 World Championships. In 1992, women performed an element on average every 10.4 seconds and men every 12.8 seconds.

Figure skaters were once subject to restrictive amateur status rules. In May 1990, the International Skating Union voted to allow skaters who were intending to skate professionally to return to ISU competition if they obtained their national association's permission. In June 1992, skaters who had already lost their eligibility were given an opportunity to apply for reinstatement in order to compete at the 1994 Winter Olympics. The Champions Series was introduced in 1995 and retitled the Grand Prix series in 1998. The Four Continents Figure Skating Championships were held for the first time in 1999 in Halifax, Nova Scotia, Canada.

Following the 2002 Winter Olympics, and the 2002 Winter Olympics figure skating scandal, the classic 6.0 system of judging was retired, and the ISU Judging System (IJS) was put in place. The 2006 Winter Olympics in Turin, Italy was the first Olympics to be judged using this protocol. Overall, the ISU Judging System has resulted in major shifts in program design, and technical scoring, and perpetual searching to "game the system" with each iteration of rule updates. In 2009, the first team event was founded in Tokyo, Japan, (World Team Trophy). After the 2009–10 season, the ice dancing competition was reduced from three segments to two by combining the compulsory and original dances into the short dance. The team event made its Olympic debut at the 2014 Winter Olympics in Sochi, Russia. Beginning in the 2014–15 season, all disciplines are allowed to use music with lyrics or words, previously restricted to ice dancing.

The competitive figure skating season runs from August until the date of the World Figure Skating Championships, typically held in March. Competitions may include various pre-novice levels, novice, junior, and senior events. Since the 1980s, four skating has disappeared while synchronized skating and solo ice dance have grown in popularity. The first World Synchronized Skating Championships were held in 2000. In September 2014, the International Skating Union sent the IOC a formal proposal for the inclusion of synchronized skating in the Winter Olympics.

== Works cited ==
- Hines, James R. (2006). Figure Skating: A History. Urbana, Illinois: University of Illinois Press. ISBN 978-0-252-07286-4. OCLC 59149288.
- Hines, James R. (2011). Historical Dictionary of Figure Skating. Lanham, Maryland: Scarecrow Press. ISBN 978-0-8108-6859-5.
- Kestnbaum, Ellyn (2003). Culture on Ice: Figure Skating and Cultural Meaning. Middletown, Connecticut: Wesleyan University Press. ISBN 0819566411.
