= 1913 World Figure Skating Championships =

Annual figure skating competition held in 1913

- Type: ISU Championship
- Season: 1913
- Location: (Austrian Empire) Vienna, Austria-Hungary (men); Stockholm, Sweden (ladies and pairs)

Champions
- Men's singles: (Austrian Empire) Fritz Kachler
- Ladies' singles: (Kingdom of Hungary) Zsófia Méray-Horváth
- Pairs: (Austrian Empire) Helene Engelmann / Karl Mejstrik
- Previous: 1912 World Championships
- Next: 1914 World Championships

The World Figure Skating Championships is an annual figure skating competition sanctioned by the International Skating Union in which figure skaters compete for the title of World Champion.

Men's competition took place on February 23 in Vienna, Austria-Hungary. Ladies' competitions took place from February 10 to 11 in Stockholm, Sweden. Pairs' competition took place on February 10 also in Stockholm, Sweden.

== Medal table ==
* Host nations (Sweden, Empire of Austria)

Rank	Nation	Gold	Silver	Bronze	Total
1	Austria*	2	1	1	4
2	Hungary	1	0	1	2
3	Great Britain	0	1	0	1
3	Russia	0	1	0	1
5	Sweden*	0	0	1	1
Totals (5 entries)		3	3	3	9

== Results ==
=== Men ===
Rank	Name	CF		FS		Total	Points	Places
1	(Austrian Empire) Fritz Kachler	1	1420.75	1	930.75	2351.50	470.30	5
2	(Austrian Empire) Willy Bockl	4	1313.75	2	901	2214.75	442.95	13
3	(Kingdom of Hungary) Andor Szende	2	1334	4	892.50	2226.50	445.30	16
4	(Russian Empire) Ivan Malinin	6	1264.75	3	896.75	2161.50	432.40	22
5	(Austrian Empire) Ernst Oppacher	3	1321.5	6	867.75	2189.25	436.85	23
6	(Sweden) Harald Rooth	7	1247.5	5	879.75	2127	425.40	28
7	(German Empire) Werner Rittberger	5	1274	7	816	2090	417.10	31
8	(German Empire) Paul Metzner	8	1167.75	8	769.25	1937	387.40	40

- Referee: (Kingdom of Hungary) Imre Szent-Györgyi

Judges:

- (Austrian Empire) Eduard Engelmann
- (Austrian Empire) Ludwig Fänner
- (Kingdom of Hungary) Jenő Minich
- (Sweden) Otto Petterson
- (Russian Empire) Piotr Weryho

=== Ladies ===
Rank	Name	Places
1	(Kingdom of Hungary) Zsófia Méray-Horváth	5
2	(United Kingdom) Phyllis Johnson	17
3	(Sweden) Svea Norén	17
4	(German Empire) Grete Strasilla	21
5	(Russian Empire) Anna Lisa Allardt	20
6	(Sweden) Magda Julin	28
7	(German Empire) Thea Frenssen	32
8	(United Kingdom) Ursula Blackwood	40

Judges:

- (Austrian Empire) Josef Fellner
- (Russian Empire) Walter Jakobsson
- (France) Louis Magnus
- (Kingdom of Hungary) Jenő Minich
- (Sweden) Otto Petterson

=== Pairs ===
Rank	Name	Places
1	(Austrian Empire) Helene Engelmann / Karl Mejstrik	9
2	(Russian Empire) Ludowika Jakobsson-Eilers / Walter Jakobsson	9.5
3	(Austrian Empire) Christa von Szabo / Leo Horwitz	11.5
4	(Norway) Alexia Bryn-Schøien / Yngvar Bryn	23
5	(Sweden) Elly Svensson / Per Thorén	24.5
6	(Sweden) Helfrid Palm / Agard Palm	30
7	(United Kingdom) A. Cadogan / Arthur Cumming	32.5

Judges:

- (Sweden) August Anderberg
- (Austrian Empire) Josef Fellner
- (France) Louis Magnus
- (Kingdom of Hungary) Jenő Minich
- (Sweden) Otto Petterson
