= 1914 World Figure Skating Championships =

Annual figure skating competition held in 1914

- Type: ISU Championship
- Season: 1914
- Location: Helsinki, Grand Duchy of Finland, Russian Empire (men); St. Moritz, Switzerland (ladies and pairs)

Champions
- Men's singles: (Sweden) Gösta Sandahl
- Ladies' singles: (Kingdom of Hungary) Zsófia Méray-Horváth
- Pairs: (Russian Empire) Ludowika Jakobsson-Eilers / Walter Jakobsson
- Previous: 1913 World Championships
- Next: 1922 World Championships

The World Figure Skating Championships is an annual figure skating competition sanctioned by the International Skating Union in which figure skaters compete for the title of World Champion.

Men's competitions took place from February 21 to 22 in Helsinki, Finland. This was the first time that more than ten men participated in the competition. Ladies' competitions took place from January 24 to 25 in St. Moritz, Switzerland. Pairs' competition took place on January 25 also in St. Moritz, Switzerland. These were the last World Championships in figure skating before World War I.

== Medal table ==
* Host nations (Switzerland, Grand Duchy of Finland)

Rank	Nation	Gold	Silver	Bronze	Total
1	Hungary	1	0	0	1
1	Russia*	1	0	0	1
1	Sweden	1	0	0	1
4	Austria	0	3	2	5
5	Great Britain	0	0	1	1
Totals (5 entries)		3	3	3	9

== Results ==
=== Men ===
Rank	Name	CF		FS		Total	Points	Places
1	(Sweden) Gösta Sandahl	3	1265.50	1	888	2153.50	430.70	12
2	(Austrian Empire) Fritz Kachler	1	1340.25	9	740	2080.25	416.05	17
3	(Austrian Empire) Willy Böckl	4	1240.50	3	836	2076.50	415.30	17
4	(Austrian Empire) Ernst Oppacher	7	1181.00	2	880	2061.00	412.20	20
5	(Kingdom of Hungary) Andor Szende	2	1279.25	7	748	2027.25	405.45	27
6	(Russian Empire) Ivan Malinin	5	1225.75	5	772	1997.75	399.55	30
7	(Sweden) Gillis Grafström	6	1210.25	8	744	1954.25	390.85	32
8	(Sweden) Harald Rooth	10	1124.25	4	808	1932.25	386.45	36
9	(Sweden) Richard Johansson	9	1139.00	5	772	1911.00	382.20	38
10	(Austrian Empire) Erwin Schwarzböck	8	1145.00	10	664	1809.00	361.80	48
11	(Norway) Martin Stixrud	11	1099.00	12	588	1687.00	337.40	55
12	(Russian Empire) Björnsson Schauman	12	997.25	11	648	1645.25	329.05	58
13	(Russian Empire) Sergey Fan-der-Flit	13	840.25	13	524	1364.25	272.85	64

- Referee: (Russian Empire) Vyacheslav Sreznevsky

Judges:

- (Sweden) H. Bardy
- (Russian Empire) Walter Jakobsson
- (Russian Empire) Nikolay Panin
- (Sweden) Otto Petterson
- (Kingdom of Hungary) Jenő Minich

=== Ladies ===
Rank	Name	Total	Points	Places
1	(Kingdom of Hungary) Zsófia Méray-Horváth	1365.50	273.10	6
2	(Austrian Empire) Angela Hanka	1271.00	254.20	10
3	(United Kingdom) Phyllis Johnson	1212.25	242.45	18
4	(German Empire) Thea Frenssen	1169.75	233.95	22
5	(Austrian Empire) Gisela Reichmann	1158.75	231.75	24.5
6	(Russian Empire) Anna Lisa Allardt	1147.50	229.50	24.5
7	(Russian Empire) Kseniya Tsezar	1051.75	210.35	35
8	(Sweden) Ramsay Salmon	869.25	178.85	41
9	(United Kingdom) Irene Lawley	766.25	153.25	44

- Referee: (Austrian Empire) Ludwig Fänner

Judges:

- (Austrian Empire) Eduard Engelmann
- (Austrian Empire) Josef Fellner
- (German Empire) Georg Helfrich
- (Russian Empire) Walter Jakobsson
- (United Kingdom) Herbert Yglesias

=== Pairs ===
Rank	Name	Places
1	(Russian Empire) Ludowika Jakobsson-Eilers / Walter Jakobsson	7
2	(Austrian Empire) Helene Engelmann / Karl Mejstrik	11
3	(Austrian Empire) Christa von Szabo / Leo Horwitz	12
4	(German Empire) Thea Frenssen / Julius Vogel	20
5	(Norway) Alexia Bryn-Schøien / Yngvar Bryn	25

- Referee: (Austrian Empire) Ludwig Fänner

Judges:

- (United Kingdom) Keiller Greig
- (German Empire) Georg Helfrich
- (United Kingdom) E. S. Hirst
- (United Kingdom) James Johnson
- (United Kingdom) Herbert Yglesias
