= 1922 European Figure Skating Championships =

Figure skating competition

1922 European Championships
- Type: ISU Championship
- Season: 1921–22
- Location: Davos, Switzerland

Champions
- Men's singles: (Austria) Willy Böckl
- Previous: 1914 European Championships
- Next: 1923 European Championships

The 1922 European Figure Skating Championships were held in Davos, Switzerland. Elite senior-level figure skaters from European ISU member nations competed for the title of European Champion in the discipline of men's singles.

== Results ==
Rank	Name	Places
1	(Austria) Willy Böckl	
2	(Austria) Fritz Kachler	
3	(Austria) Ernst Oppacher	
4	(Germany) Werner Rittberger	
5	(Norway) Martin Stixrud	
6	(Finland) Sakari Ilmanen	
7	(Finland) Gunnar Jakobsson	
8	(Germany) Artur Vieregg	
9	(Switzerland) Georges Gautschi	
10	(Czechoslovakia) Wilhelm Czech	
