= History of dance =

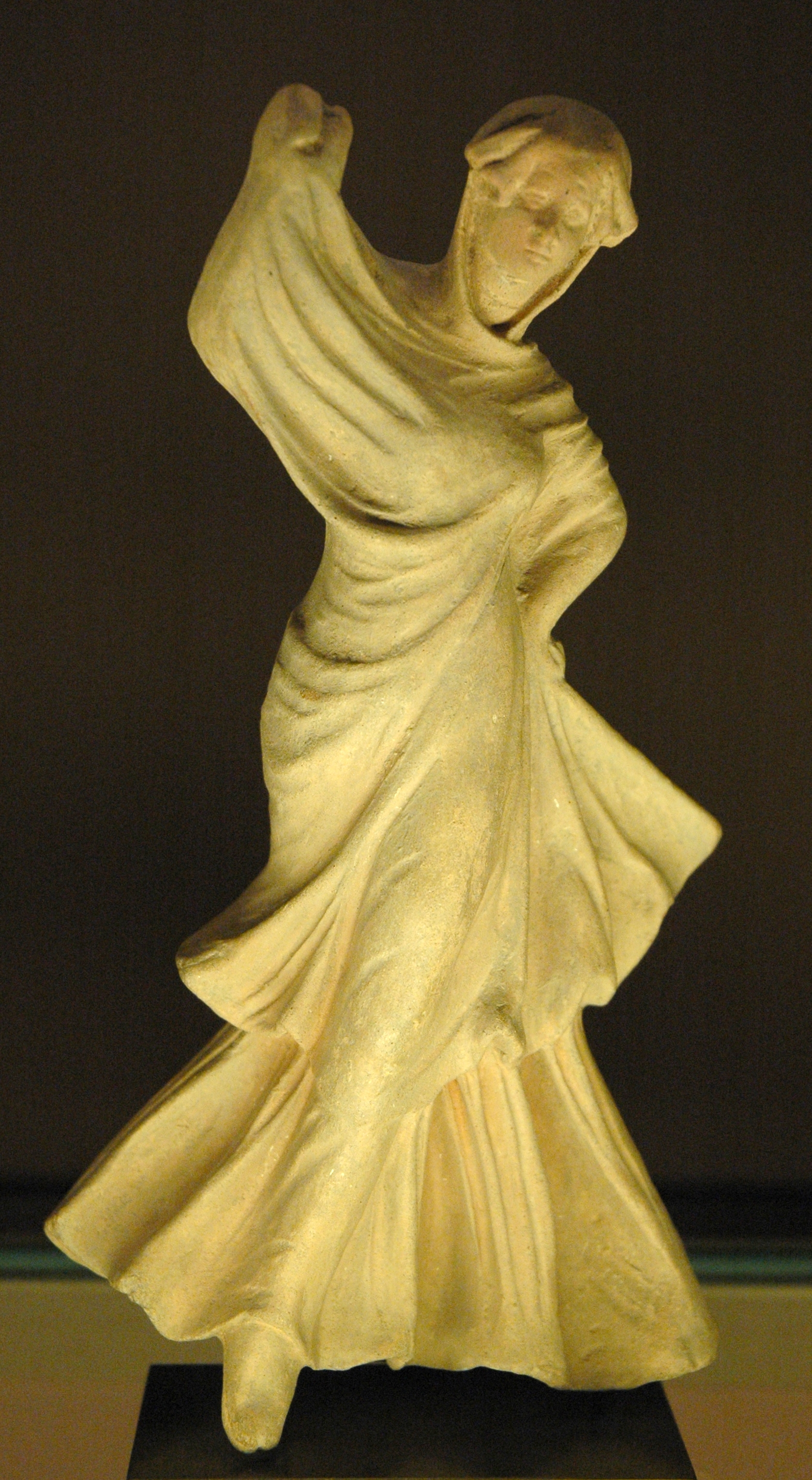
Veiled dancer, ancient Greek terracotta figurine from Myrina, c. 150–100 BC. Louvre Museum

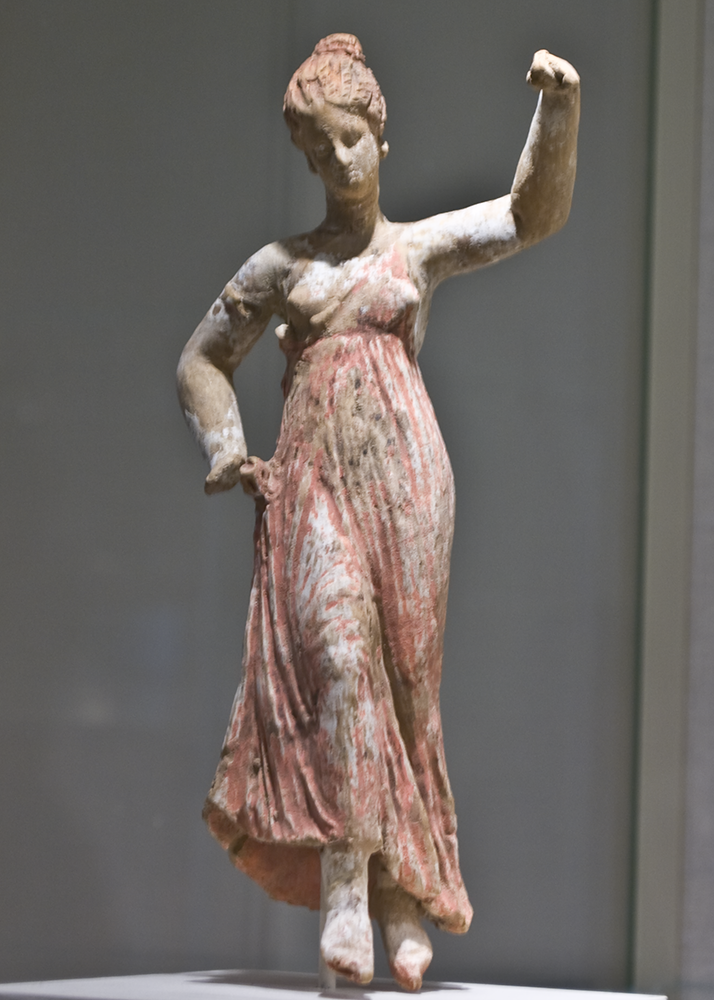
Ancient Greek terracotta statuette of a dancing maenad, 3rd century BC, from Taranto.

The history of dance is difficult to access because dance does not often leave behind clearly identifiable physical artifacts that last over millennia, such as stone tools, hunting implements or cave paintings. It is difficult to determine the exact point at which dance became part of human culture. Dance is filled with aesthetic values, making it distinct from one society to another. It is filled with symbolism that expounds on the cultural heritage of a community, each style being unique from one another. Dance can help tell a story, convey feelings and emotions, and connect with others and ourselves.

== Early dance ==
The natural impulse to dance has been found to exist in primates in response to rhythmic beat.

Dance has been an important part of ceremony, rituals, celebrations and entertainment since before the birth of the earliest human civilizations. Archaeology delivers traces of dance from prehistoric times such as the Bhimbetka rock shelters paintings in India from thousands of years ago and Egyptian tomb depicting dancing figures from c. 3300 BC. Many contemporary dance forms can be traced back to historical, traditional, ceremonial and ethnic dances of the ancient period.

=== Means of social communication and bonding ===
Dance may have been used as a tool of social interaction that promoted cooperation essential for survival among early humans. Studies found that today's best dancers share two specific genes associated with a predisposition for being good at social communication.

Also, the term "kinesthetic" is the right term to help understanding how dance makes communication. "Kinesthetic" means recognition of movement of one's own body, and is a combination of two words (Greek: kinein "to move", aesthesis "perception"). Dance movements and accompanying sounds also play a significant role. In group performances (whether through holding hands, linking shoulders, or facing one another) participants often develop a sense of communication and social bonding.

=== As folk celebrations ===
Many dances of the early periods were performed as a ritual to the gods who ancestors believed needed to be kept entertained for world peace. Dance was used in many celebrations and continues to be used for the same purpose. Throughout history we can notice that dance had many uses such as also community dance, harvesting and worship. Dance evolution started as folk origins to court presentations and now theater or even cinema movies.

=== In ceremonies and rituals ===
Dance may be performed in religious or shamanic rituals, for example in rain dance performed in times of drought. Shamans dancing for rain is mentioned in ancient Chinese texts. Dance is an important aspect of some religious rites in ancient Egypt, similarly dance is also integral to many ceremonies and rites among African people. Ritual dances may also be performed in temples and during religious festivals, for example the Rasa ritual dances of India (a number of Indian classical dances may have their origin in ritual dances), and the Cham dances of Tibet.

=== As a method of healing ===
Another early use of dance may have been as a precursor to ecstatic trance states in healing rituals. Dance is used for this purpose by many cultures from the Brazilian rainforest to the Kalahari Desert. Medieval European danses macabres were thought to have protected participants from disease; however, the hysteria and duration of these dances sometimes led to death due to exhaustion.

According to a Sinhalese legend, Kandyan dances originated 2500 years ago from a magic dance ritual that broke the spell on a bewitched king to cure the king of a mysterious illness.

=== As a method of expression ===
One of the earliest structured uses of dances may have been in the performance and telling of myths. It was also sometimes used to show feelings for one of the opposite gender. It is also linked to the origin of "lovemaking". Before the production of written languages, dance was one of the methods of passing these stories down from generation to generation.

In European culture, one of the earliest records of dancing is by Homer, whose Iliad describes chorea (χορεία khoreia). The early Greeks made the art of dancing into a system, expressive of all the different passions. For example, the dance of the Furies, so represented, would create complete terror among those who witnessed them. The Greek philosopher, Aristotle, ranked dancing with poetry, and said that certain dancers, with rhythm applied to gesture, could express manners, passions, and actions. The most eminent Greek sculptors studied the attitude of the dancers for their art of imitating the passion.

== Cultural traditions ==
=== Asia ===
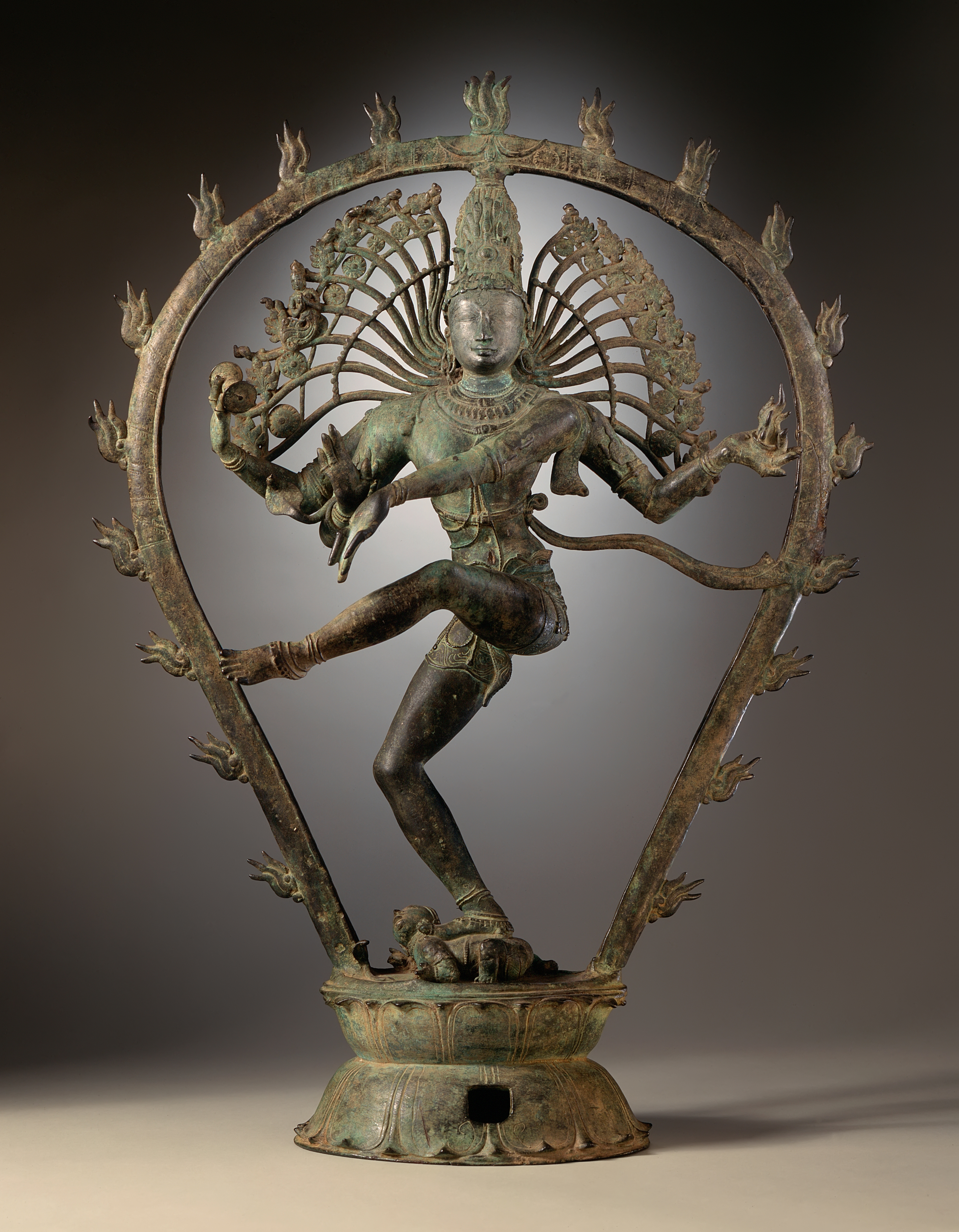
Shiva as Nataraja (Lord of Dance)

==== Indian classical dance ====
An early manuscript describing dance is the Natya Shastra on which is based the modern interpretation of classical Indian dance (e.g. Bharathanatyam).

During the reign of the last Mughals and Nawabs of Oudh, dance fell down to the status of 'nautch', an unethical sensuous thing of courtesans.

Later, linking dance with immoral trafficking and prostitution, British rule prohibited public performance of dance. Many disapproved of it. In 1947, India won its freedom and created for dance an ambience where it could regain its past glory. Classical forms and regional distinctions were re-discovered, ethnic specialties were honored, and by synthesizing them with the individual talents of the masters in the line and fresh innovations, emerged dance with a new face but with classicism of the past.

In Sri Lanka, the ancient Sinhalese chronicle Mahavamsa states that when King Vijaya landed in Sri Lanka in 543 BCE he heard sounds of music and dancing from a wedding ceremony. The origins of the dances of Sri Lanka are dated back to the aboriginal tribes, and to the mythological times of aboriginal yingyang twins and "yakkas" (devils). The classical dances of Sri Lanka (Kandyan dances) feature a highly developed system of tala (rhythm) and provided by cymbals called thalampataa.

==== Chinese dance ====
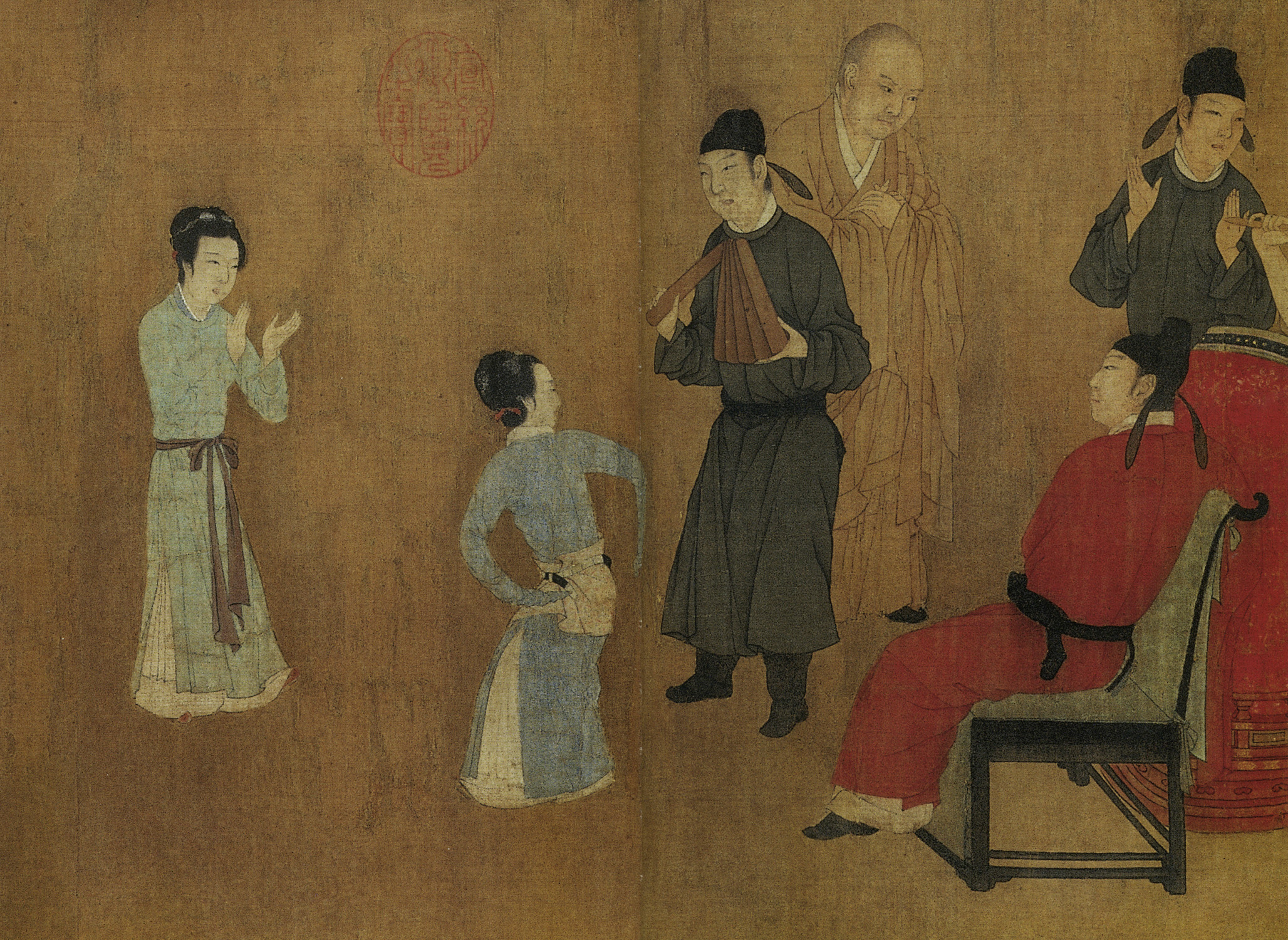
Details from a copy of a 10th-century painting Night Revels of Han Xizai by Gu Hongzhong, depicting a dancer performing a dance known in the Tang dynasty.

There is a long recorded history of Chinese dances. Some of the dances mentioned in ancient texts, such as dancing with sleeve movements are still performed today. Some of the early dances were associated with shamanic rituals. Folk dances of the early period were also developed into court dances. The important dances of the ancient period were the ceremonial yayue dated to the Zhou dynasty of the first millennium BC. The art of dance in China reached its peak during the Tang dynasty, a period when dancers from many parts of the world also performed at the imperial court. However, Chinese opera became popular during the Song and Yuan dynasty, and many dances were merged into Chinese opera. The art of dance in women also declined from the Song dynasty onward as a result of the increasing popularity of footbinding, a practice that ironically may have originated from dancing when a dancer wrapped her feet so she may dance ballet-fashion. The best-known of the Chinese traditional dances are the dragon dance and lion dance. Lion dance was described in the Tang dynasty in form that resembles today's dance.

==== Iranian dance ====
===== Prehistory =====
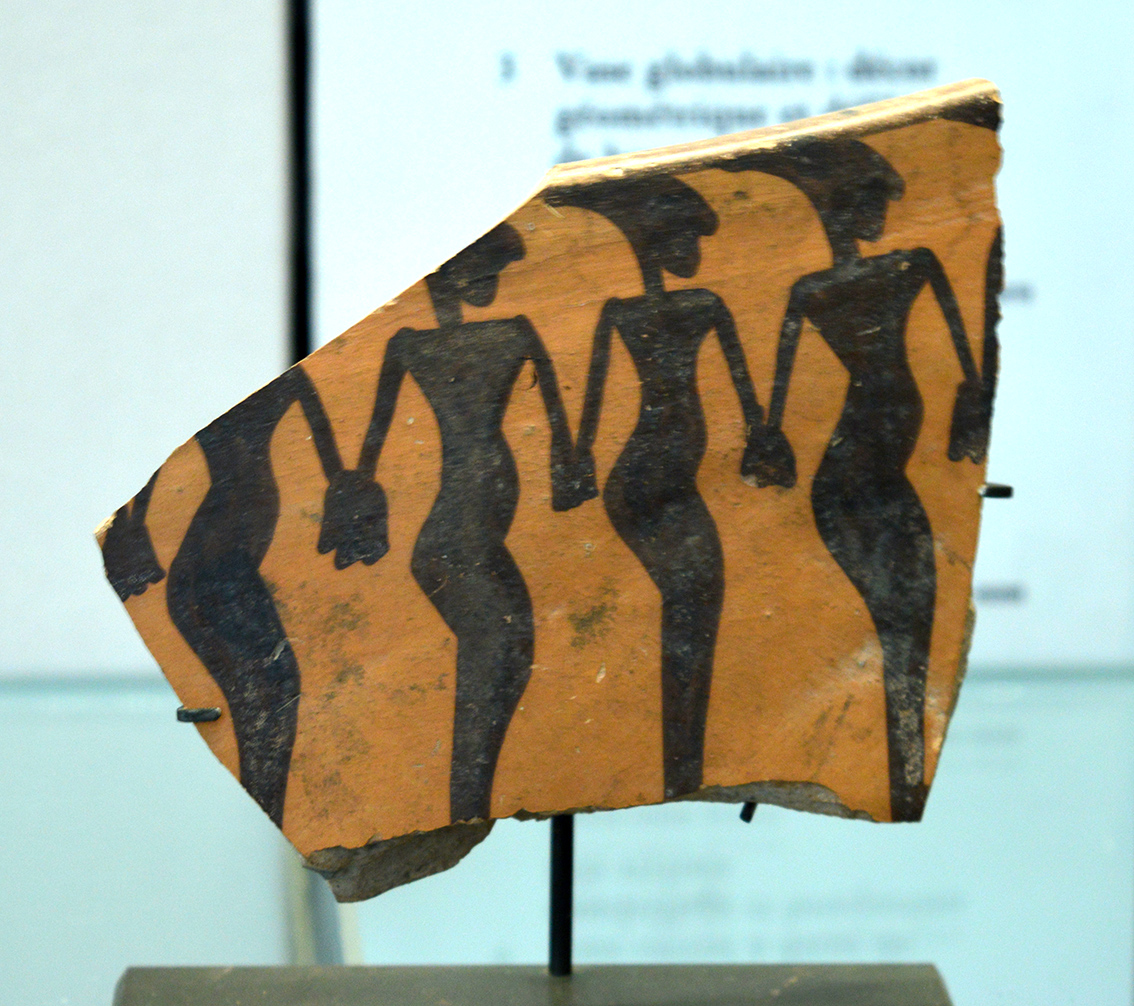
Dancers on a piece of ceramic from Cheshmeh-Ali (Shahr-e-Rey), Iran, 5000 BC now at the Louvre

The people of the Iranian plateau have known dance in the forms of music, play, drama or religious rituals and have used instruments like mask, costumes of animals or plants, and musical instruments for rhythm, at least since the 6th millennium BC. Cultural mixed forms of dance, play and drama have served rituals like celebration, mourning and worship. And the actors have been masters of music, dance, physical acts and manners of expression. Artifacts with pictures of dancers, players or actors were found in many archaeological prehistoric sites in Iran, like Tepe Sabz, Ja'far Abad, Chogha Mish, Tall-e Jari, Cheshmeh Ali, Ismaeel Abad, Tal-e bakun, Tepe Sialk, Tepe Musian, tepe Yahya, Shahdad, Tepe Gian, Kul Farah, Susa, Kok Tepe, Cemeteries of Luristan, etc.

===== History =====
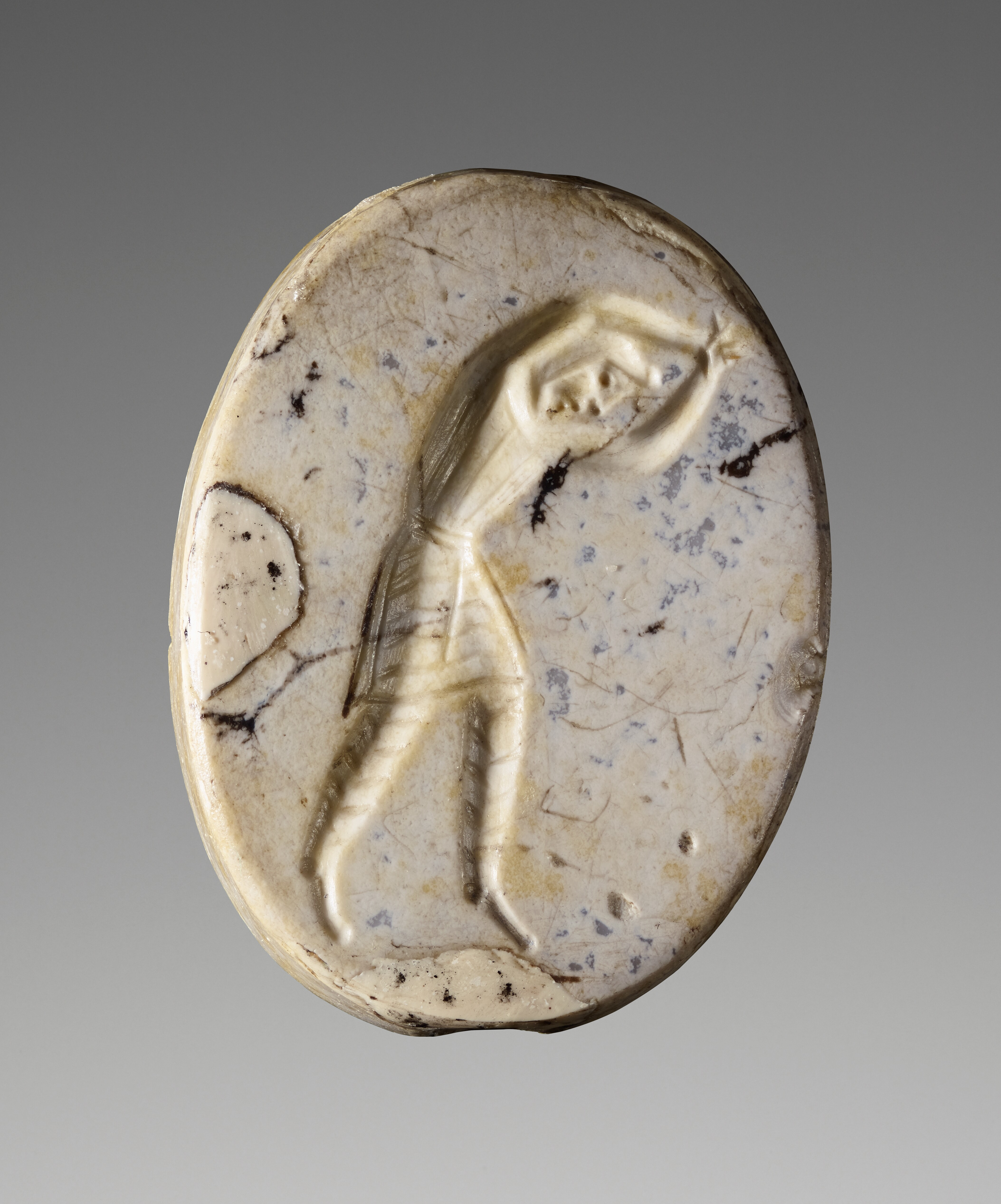
Seal with a Persian man dancing, Achaemenid period, dated c. 400 BC. Currently housed in the J. Paul Getty Museum in Los Angeles

The earliest researched dance from historic Iran is a dance worshiping Mithra (as in the Cult of Mithras) in which a bull was sacrificed. This cult later became highly adhered in the Roman Empire. This dance was to promote vigor in life. Ancient Persian dance was significantly researched by Greek historian from Herodotus of Halikarnassos, in his work Book IX (Calliope), in which he describes the history of Asian empires and Persian wars until 478 BC. Ancient Persia was occupied by foreign powers, first Greeks, then Arabs, and then Mongols and in turn political instability and civil wars occurred. Throughout these changes a slow disappearance of heritage dance traditions occurred.

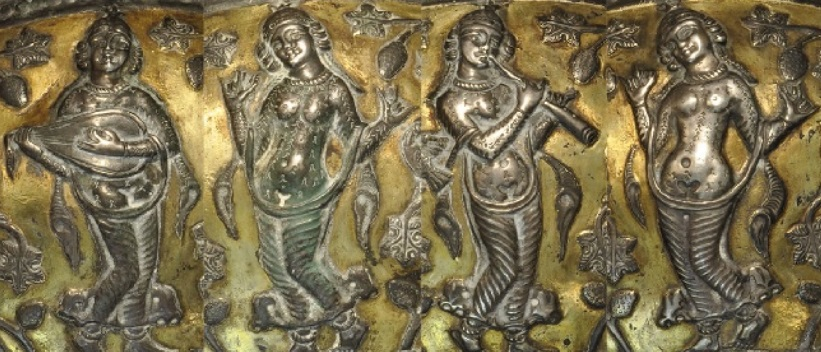
Dancers and musicians on a Sasanian bowl

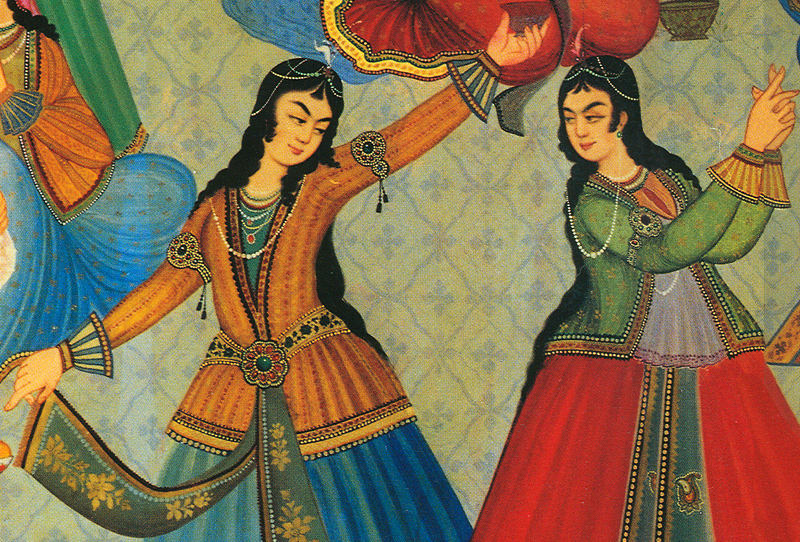
17th century Persian women dance in a ceremony in Iran

Religious prohibition of dancing in Iran came with the spread of Islam, but it was spurred by historical events. Religious prohibition to dancing waxed and waned over the years, but after the Iranian Revolution in 1979 dancing was no longer allowed due to its frequent mixing of the sexes. The Islamic Revolution of 1979 was the end of a successful era for dancing and the art of ballet in Iran. The Iranian national ballet company was dissolved and its members emigrated to different countries. According to the principles of the "cultural revolution" in Iran, dancing was considered to be perverse, a great sin, immoral and corrupting. As a result, many of the talented Persian dancers moved to the West and spread out mainly in Europe and the United States and a new generation of Iranian dancers and ballet artists have grown up in the Diaspora.

=== Europe ===
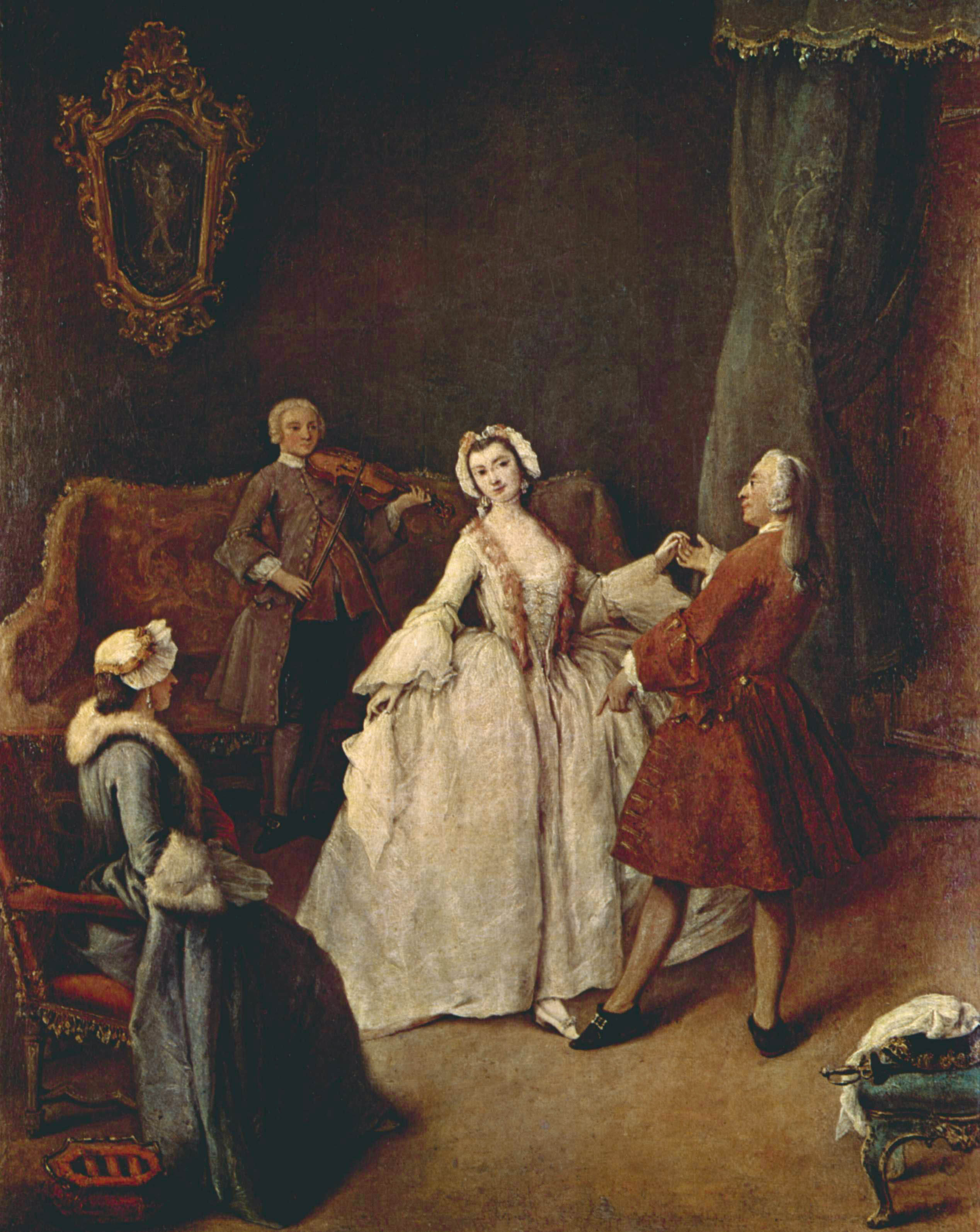
Pietro Longhi, La lezione di danza ("The Dancing Lesson"), ca 1741, Venezia, Gallerie dell'Accademia.

==== 15th–19th centuries: from court dancing to Romanticism ====
The origins of ballet dancing can be traced to the Italian Renaissance courts of the 15th century. Dance masters would teach the steps to nobility and the court would participate in performances as a form of social entertainment. This practice continued for several centuries. In the 17th century, courtly ballet reached its peak under the rule of King Louis XIV.

By the 18th century, ballet had migrated from the French and Italian royal courts to the Paris Opéra under the careful direction of composer/dancer Jean-Baptiste Lully. Lully sought to develop ballet into more serious art. Under his influence, ballet was turned into a recognized art that was performed by professional dancers rather than courtiers.

During the 18th century, ballet transitioned from a courtly dance of moving images as a spectacle to performance art in its own right. Ballet performances developed around a central narrative and contained an expressive movement that revealed the relationships between characters. This dramatic style of ballet became known as the ballet d'action. The ballet d'action strove to express, for the first time, human emotions drawn directly from the dancers themselves. Masks previously worn by performers were removed so that emotional content could be derived from facial expressions.

Costumes during this time were very restricting for dancers. Although a more expressive use of the body was encouraged, dancers' movements were still restricted due to heavy materials and corseted dresses. Costumes often covered a dancer's physique and made it difficult to see complex or intricate choreography. It was not until choreographer Jean Georges Noverre called for dance reforms in 1760 with his Letters on Dancing and Ballets that costumes became more conducive. Noverre urged that costumes be crafted using lightweight fabrics that move fluidly with the body, complementing a dancer's figure. In addition, dancers wore soft slippers that fit snugly along the foot. This shoe design instilled confidence within the ballerina, daring her to dance on her toes. Naturalistic costuming allowed dancers to push the boundaries of movement, eventually rising en pointe.

The era of Romanticism produced ballets inspired by fantasy, mystique, and the unfamiliar cultures of exotic places. Ballets that focused more on the emotions, the fantasy and the spiritual worlds and heralded the beginning of true pointe-work. Now, on her toes, the deified ballerina (embodied in this period by the legendary ballerina Marie Taglioni) seemed to magically skim the surface of the stage, an ethereal being never quite touching the ground. It was during this period that the ascending star of the ballerina quite eclipsed the presence of the poor male dancer, who was in many cases reduced to the status of a moving statue, present only in order to lift the ballerina. This sad state was really only redressed by the rise of the male ballet star Vaslav Nijinsky, with the Ballets Russes, in the early 20th century. Ballet as we know it had well and truly evolved by this time, with all the familiar conventions of costume, choreographic form, plot, pomp, and circumstance firmly fixed in place. Nijinsky brought athleticism into ballet. Although at that time his choreography was considered as controversial, now they are considered as one of the first contemporary ballets.

==== Early 20th century: from ballet to contemporary dance ====
Since the Ballets Russes began revolutionizing ballet in the early 20th century, there have been continued attempts to break the mold of classical ballet. Currently the artistic scope of ballet technique (and its accompanying music, jumper, and multimedia) is more all-encompassing than ever. The boundaries that classify a work of classical ballet are constantly being stretched, muddied and blurred until perhaps all that remains today are traces of technique idioms such as turnout.

The 20th century was a period of a change from ballet previously. It was a time of new ideas, for dancers and choreographers. It was also a time of the broadening of the definition of dance. Ballets Russes was a turning point to the future of ballet in the West and in the world. Collaborating with that era's artistic inspirations, such as Coco Chanel, Pablo Picasso and others. Ballets Russes brought together music, design and dance together in one performance.

=== Africa ===
African dance refers mainly to the dance styles of Sub-Saharan Africa, of which many are based on traditional rhythms and music traditions of the region. Modern African dance styles are deeply rooted in culture and tradition. Many tribes have a role solely for the purpose of passing on the tribe's dance traditions; dances which have been passed down through the centuries, often unchanged, with little to no room for improvisation. Each tribe developed its own unique style of dance, falling into three categories based on purpose.

- The first is religious dancing, which many tribes purport enhances peace, health, and prosperity. Religious dances often involved masqueraders, performing as both the spirits and those who placated them. Religion and spirituality infused every part of traditional African life, and continues to affect African dance today.
- The second is griotic, and was a type of dance that told a story. It is named after a griot, which is a term for a traditional storyteller in West Africa. Certain griotic dances were only danced by the tribe's griot; today, troupes perform the same dances that were once exclusive to the griot.
- The third type is ceremonial. These dances are performed at ceremonies such as weddings, anniversaries, and rites of passage.

However, many dances did not have only one purpose. Rather, there was often one primary purpose, that blended into many secondary purposes. Dance was often very important to the maintenance of a ruler's status in the tribal society. Colonialism and globalization have resulted in the eradication of certain styles of African dance. Other styles have been blended together, or mixed with dance styles outside of Africa.

==== African dance in the context of slavery ====
As people were taken from Africa to be sold as slaves, especially starting in the 1500s, they brought their dance styles with them. Entire cultures were imported into the New World, especially those areas where slaves were given more flexibility to continue their cultures and where there were more African slaves than Europeans or indigenous Americans, such as Brazil. African dance styles were merged with new cultural experiences to form new styles of dance. For example, slaves responded to the fears of their masters about high-energy styles of dance with changing stepping to shuffling. However, in North America, slaves did not have as much freedom to continue their culture and dance. In many cases, these dances have evolved into modern dance styles, such as African-American dance and Brazilian dance. For example, the Calenda evolved in Brazil from tribal dance. The Calenda then evolved into the Cakewalk, which was danced originally to mock plantation owners; it then evolved into the Charleston. Capoeira was a martial art practiced originally in Africa which the enslaved Africans masked as a form of dance in order to not arouse the suspicion of plantation owners.

== The late 20th and early 21st centuries ==
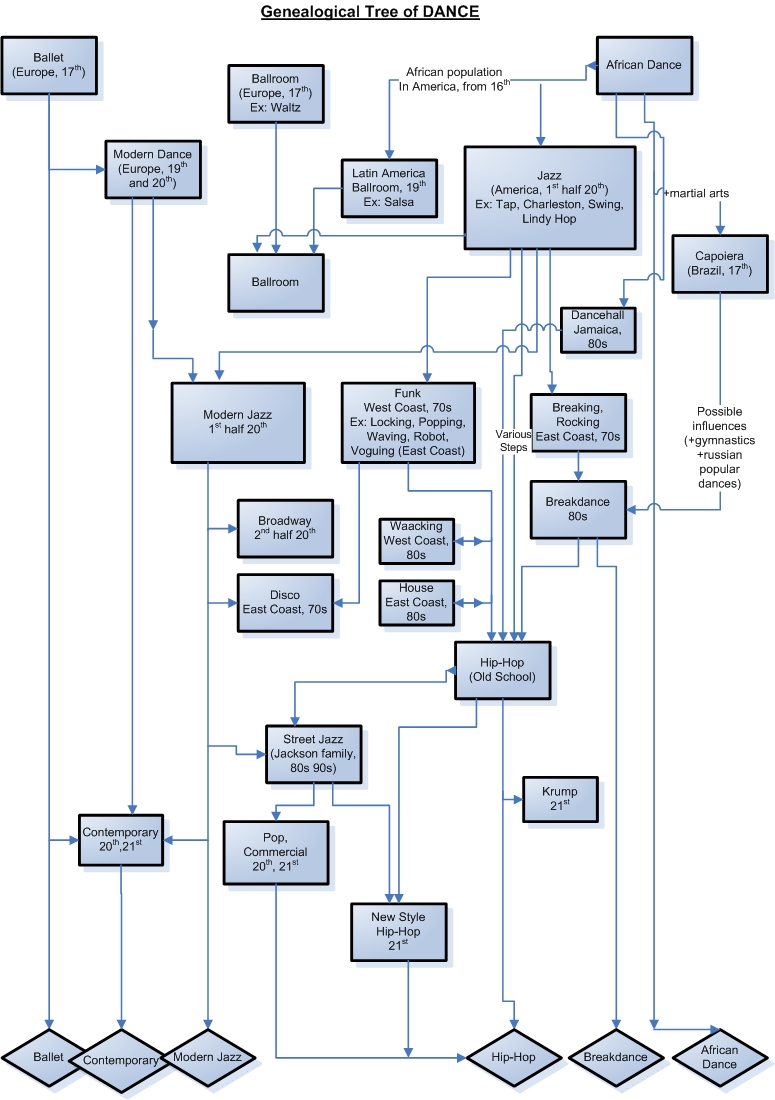
Diagram of 20th century American dance history

=== Postmodernism ===
After the explosion of modern dance in the early 20th century, the 1960s saw the growth of postmodernism. Postmodernism veered towards simplicity, the beauty of small things, the beauty of untrained body, and unsophisticated movement. The famous "No" manifesto, by Yvonne Rainer, rejecting all costumes, stories and outer trappings in favour of raw and unpolished movement was perhaps the extreme of this wave of thinking. However, it was not long before sets, décor and shock value re-entered the vocabulary of modern choreographers.

=== Street dance ===
At the same time, mass culture experienced expansion of street dance. In 1973, famous group Jackson 5 performed on television a dance called Robot (choreographed by postmodern artist Michael Jackson), a dance form cultivated in Richmond, CA. This event and later Soul Train performances by black dancers (such as Don Cambell) ignited a street culture revolution, in a sense. B-boying in New York; Locking in L.A.; Popping in Fresno, CA; Boogaloo in Oakland, CA; Robot in Richmond, CA; all had their own creative explosions happen around the late '60s–'70s. Each with its own histories, practices, innovators and foundations.

For the emergence of 20th-century modern dance see also: Mary Wigman, Gret Palucca, Harald Kreutzberg, Yvonne Georgi, and Isadora Duncan.

Hip-hop dance started when Clive Campbell, aka Kool DJ Herc and the father of hip-hop, came to New York from Jamaica in 1967. Toting the seeds of reggae from his homeland, he is credited with being the first DJ to use two turntables and identical copies of the same record to create his jams. But it was his extension of the breaks in these songs—the musical section where the percussive beats were most aggressive—that allowed him to create and name a culture of break boys and break girls who laid it down when the breaks came up. Briefly termed b-boys and b-girls, these dancers founded breakdancing, which is now a cornerstone of hip-hop dance.

== See also ==
- History of ballet
- History of figure skating
