= Gösta Sandahl =

Swedish figure skater

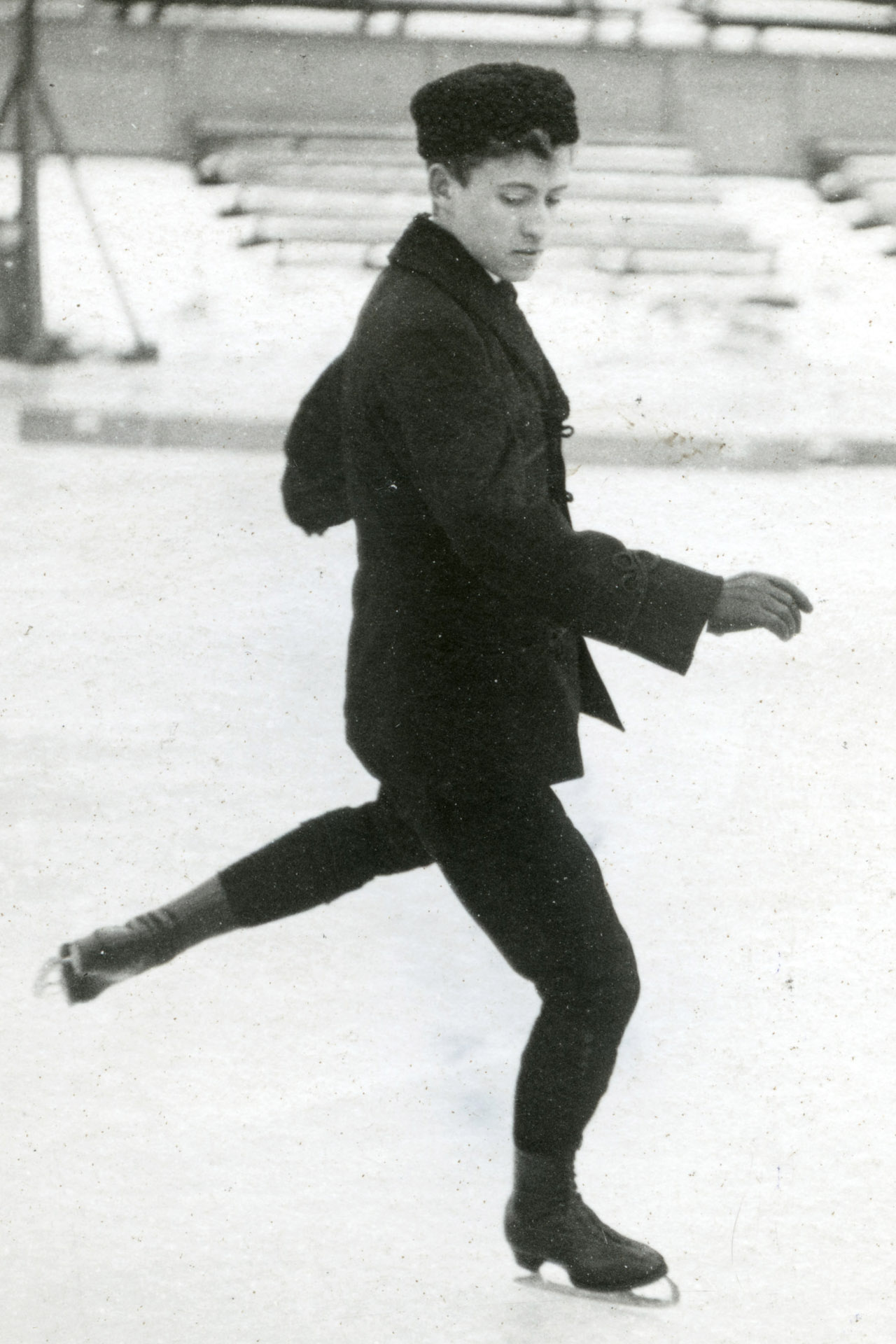

Personal information
- Born: January 13, 1893

Figure skating career
- Country: Sweden
Medal record
Representing Sweden
Men's Figure skating
World Championships
Gold medal – first place	1914 Helsinki	Men's singles
Bronze medal – third place	1923 Stockholm	Men's singles
European Championships
Gold medal – first place	1914 Vienna	Men's singles

Gösta Sandahl (born January 13, 1893) was a Swedish figure skater. He was the 1912 European Champion and the 1914 World Champion. He stopped participating in the sport in 1916 due to religious reasons, but made a temporary comeback in 1923, and won the Swedish Championships that year.

== Results ==
Event	1910	1911	1912	1913	1914	1916	1923
World Championships					1st		3rd
European Championships			1st				
Swedish Championships	2nd	1st	1st	1st		1st	1st
