= Christa von Szabó =

Austrian figure skater

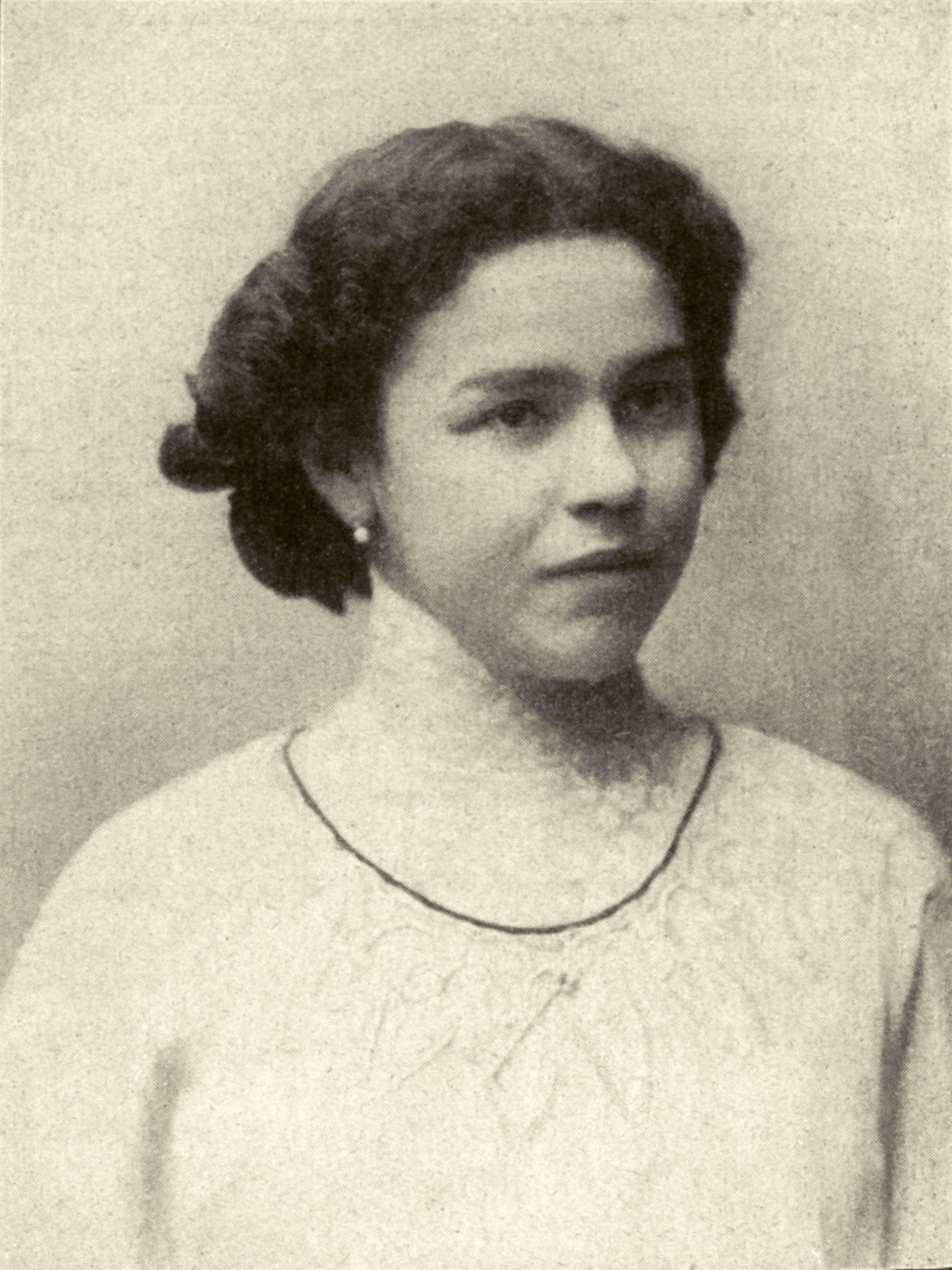

Figure skating career
- Country: Austria
Medal record
Representing Austria
Pairs figure skating
World Championships
Bronze medal – third place	1913 Stockholm	Pairs
Bronze medal – third place	1914 St. Moritz	Pairs

Christa von Szabó was an Austrian figure skater who competed in pair skating.

With partner Leo Horwitz, she won bronze medals at two World Figure Skating Championships: in 1913 and 1914.

== Competitive highlights ==
With Leo Horwitz

International
Event	1913	1914
World Championships	3rd	3rd
National
Austrian Championships	2nd	1st
