= Angela Hanka =

Personal information
- Born: 13 May 1891
- Died: 1 February 1963 (aged 71)

Figure skating career
- Country: Austria
Medal record
Representing Austria
Ladies' figure skating
World Championships
Silver medal – second place	1914 St. Moritz	Ladies

Angela Hanka (13 May 1891 - 1 February 1963) was an Austrian figure skater who competed in ladies' singles.

She won the silver medal in ladies' single skating at the 1914 World Figure Skating Championships.

== Competitive highlights ==
Event	1914
World Championships	2
