= 1922 World Figure Skating Championships =

Annual figure skating competition held in 1922

- Type: ISU Championship
- Season: 1922
- Location: Stockholm, Sweden (singles); Davos, Switzerland (pairs)

Champions
- Men's singles: (Sweden) Gillis Grafström
- Ladies' singles: (Austria) Herma Plank-Szabo
- Pairs: (Austria) Helene Engelmann / Alfred Berger
- Previous: 1914 World Championships
- Next: 1923 World Championships

The World Figure Skating Championships is an annual figure skating competition sanctioned by the International Skating Union in which figure skaters compete for the title of World Champion. Men's competitions took place from February 5 to 6 in Stockholm, Sweden. Ladies' competitions took place from February 4 to 6 in Stockholm, Sweden. Pairs' competition took place on January 29 in Davos, Switzerland.

== Medal table ==
* Host nations (Switzerland, Sweden)

Rank	Nation	Gold	Silver	Bronze	Total
1	Austria	2	1	1	4
2	Sweden*	1	1	0	2
3	Finland	0	1	0	1
4	Germany	0	0	1	1
4	Norway	0	0	1	1
Totals (5 entries)		3	3	3	9

== Results ==
=== Men ===
Rank	Name	Places
1	(Sweden) Gillis Grafström	7
2	(Austria) Fritz Kachler	8
3	(Austria) Willy Böckl	15
4	(Norway) Martin Stixrud	20

Judges:

- (Sweden) August Anderberg
- (Austria) Josef Fellner
- (Sweden) Victor Lindqvist
- (Norway) Knut Ørn Meinich
- (Sweden) Otto Petterson

=== Ladies ===
Rank	Name	Places
1	(Austria) Herma Plank-Szabo	5
2	(Sweden) Svea Norén	11
3	(Norway) Margot Moe	14

Judges:

- (Sweden) August Anderberg
- (Sweden) Victor Lindqvist
- (Norway) Knut Ørn Meinich
- (Sweden) H. Petterson
- (Sweden) O. Sampe

=== Pairs ===
Rank	Name	Places
1	(Austria) Helene Engelmann / Alfred Berger	6
2	(Finland) Ludowika Jakobsson-Eilers / Walter Jakobsson	12.5
3	(Germany) Margarete Metzner / Paul Metzner	17.5
4	(Germany) Grete Weise / Georg Velisch	17
5	(Norway) Alexia Bryn-Schøien / Yngvar Bryn	22

Judges:

- (Austria) Ludwig Fänner
- (Austria) Josef Feller
- (Switzerland) W. Holsboer
- (Finland) Sakari Ilmanen
- (Switzerland) G. Künzli
