= Karl Mejstrik =

Figure skating career
- Country: Austria
- Partner: Helene Engelmann
- Retired: 1914
Medal record
Representing Austria
Figure skating: Pairs
World Championships
Silver medal – second place	1914 St. Moritz	Pairs
Gold medal – first place	1913 Stockholm	Pairs

Karl Mejstrik was an Austrian pair skater. Competing with Helene Engelmann, he became the 1913 World champion and 1914 World silver medalist.

== Results ==
=== Men's singles ===
National
Event	1910	1911
Austrian Championships	2nd	2nd

=== Pairs with Engelmann ===
International
Event	1913	1914
World Championships	1st	2nd
National
Austrian Championships	1st	2nd
