= Georg Zachariades =

Austrian industrialist, figure skater and racing cyclist

Personal information
- Born: 29 February 1868 Vienna

Figure skating career
- Country: Germany
Medal record
Representing Germany
Men's figure skating
European Championships
Bronze medal – third place	1892 Vienna	Men
Bronze medal – third place	1893 Berlin	Men

Georg Zachariades was an Austrian industrialist, figure skater and racing cyclist of Greek descent.

Competing in men's singles for Germany, he won the bronze medals at the 1892 and 1893 European Figure Skating Championships.

== Competitive highlights ==
Event	1892	1893	1894
European Championships	3rd	3rd	4th
German Championships	1st	1st	2nd
