= 1892 European Figure Skating Championships =

Figure skating competition

- Type: ISU Championship
- Date: January 24
- Season: 1892
- Location: (Austrian Empire) Vienna, Austria-Hungary

Champions
- Men's singles: (Austrian Empire) Eduard Engelmann
- Previous: 1891 European Championships
- Next: 1893 European Championships

The 1892 European Figure Skating Championships were held on January 24 in Vienna, Austria. Elite figure skaters competed for the title of European Champion in the category of men's singles. The competitors performed compulsory figures and, for the first time in a major international competition, free skating.

The skating associations of Germany and Austria had merged, and they organised these second European Championships before the International Skating Union (ISU) was founded over the summer. The ISU then organised subsequent Championships.

== Results ==
Rank	Name
1	(Austrian Empire) Eduard Engelmann
2	(Kingdom of Hungary) Tibor Földváry
3	(Austrian Empire) Georg Zachariades
4	(Austrian Empire) Karl Kaiser
5	(Austrian Empire) Josef Nowy
6	(Austrian Empire) Gustav Hügel
7	(Austrian Empire) Alfred Klement
8	(German Empire) Fritz Ahrendt
