= Leo Horwitz =

Figure skating career
- Country: Austria
Medal record
Representing Austria
Pairs figure skating
World Championships
Bronze medal – third place	1913 Stockholm	Pairs
Bronze medal – third place	1914 St. Moritz	Pairs

Leo Horwitz was an Austrian figure skater who competed in pair skating.

With partner Christa von Szabó, he won bronze medals at two World Figure Skating Championships: in 1913 and 1914.

== Competitive highlights ==
With Christa von Szabó

International
Event	1913	1914
World Championships	3rd	3rd
National
Austrian Championships	2nd	1st
