= 1923 European Figure Skating Championships =

Figure skating competition

1923 European Championships
- Type: ISU Championship
- Season: 1922–23
- Location: Oslo, Norway

Champions
- Men's singles: (Austria) Willy Böckl
- Previous: 1922 European Championships
- Next: 1924 European Championships

The 1923 European Figure Skating Championships were held in Oslo, Norway. Elite senior-level figure skaters from European ISU member nations competed for the title of European Champion in the discipline of men's singles.

== Results ==
| Rank | Name | Places |
|---|---|---|
| 1 | (Austria) Willy Böckl | |
| 2 | (Norway) Martin Stixrud | |
| 3 | (Finland) Gunnar Jakobsson | |
| 4 | (Sweden) Kaj af Ekström | |
