= Margarete Metzner =

German figure skater

Figure skating career
- Country: Germany
Medal record
Representing Germany
Figure skating: Pairs
World Championships
Bronze medal – third place	1922 Davos	Pairs

Margarete Metzner (née Klebe) was a German figure skater who competed in ladies' singles and pair skating.

With her husband, Paul Metzner, she won the bronze medal at the 1922 World Figure Skating Championships in Davos, Switzerland.

== Competitive highlights ==
=== Singles (as Margarete Klebe) ===
Event	1917	1918	1919
German Championships	2nd	3rd	2rd

=== Pairs ===
With Paul Metzner

Event	1920	1922
World Championships		3rd**
German Championships	1st*	

^{*} as Margarete Klebe
^{*} as Margarete Metzner
