= 1924 European Figure Skating Championships =

Figure skating competition

1924 European Championships
- Type: ISU Championship
- Season: 1923–24
- Location: Davos, Switzerland

Champions
- Men's singles: (Austria) Fritz Kachler
- Previous: 1923 European Championships
- Next: 1925 European Championships

The 1924 European Figure Skating Championships were held in Davos, Switzerland. Elite senior-level figure skaters from European ISU member nations competed for the title of European Champion in the discipline of men's singles.

== Results ==
Rank	Name	Places
1	(Austria) Fritz Kachler	
2	(Austria) Ludwig Wrede	
3	(Germany) Werner Rittberger	
4	(Austria) Otto Preißecker	
5	(United Kingdom) John Page	
6	(Germany) Paul Franke	
7	(Switzerland) Georges Gautschi	
8	(Germany) Artur Vieregg	
9	(Germany) Fritz Schober	
