= 1914 European Figure Skating Championships =

Figure skating competition

- Type: ISU Championship
- Date: February 8
- Season: 1914
- Location: (Austrian Empire) Vienna, Austria-Hungary

Champions
- Men's singles: (Austrian Empire) Fritz Kachler
- Previous: 1913 European Championships
- Next: 1922 European Championships

The 1914 European Figure Skating Championships were held on February 8 in Vienna, Austria. Elite figure skaters competed for the title of European Champion in the category of men's singles. These were the last European Championships in Figure Skating before World War I.

== Results ==
Rank	Name	Places
1	(Austrian Empire) Fritz Kachler	8
2	(Norway) Andreas Krogh	12
3	(Austrian Empire) Willy Böckl	13
4	(Austrian Empire) Ernst Oppacher	17
5	(Austrian Empire) Ludwig Wrede	27
6	(Austrian Empire) Josef Oppacher	31
7	(Austrian Empire) Erwin Schwarzböck	32

Judges:

- (Austrian Empire) Otto Bohatsch
- (Austrian Empire) Emanuel Hajek
- (Austrian Empire) Karl Kaiser
- (Austrian Empire) Hans Pfeiffer
- (United Kingdom) Henry Yglesias
