= Timofey Fan-der-Flit =

Timofey Yefremovich Fan-der-Flit
- Тимофей Ефремович Фан-дер-Флит
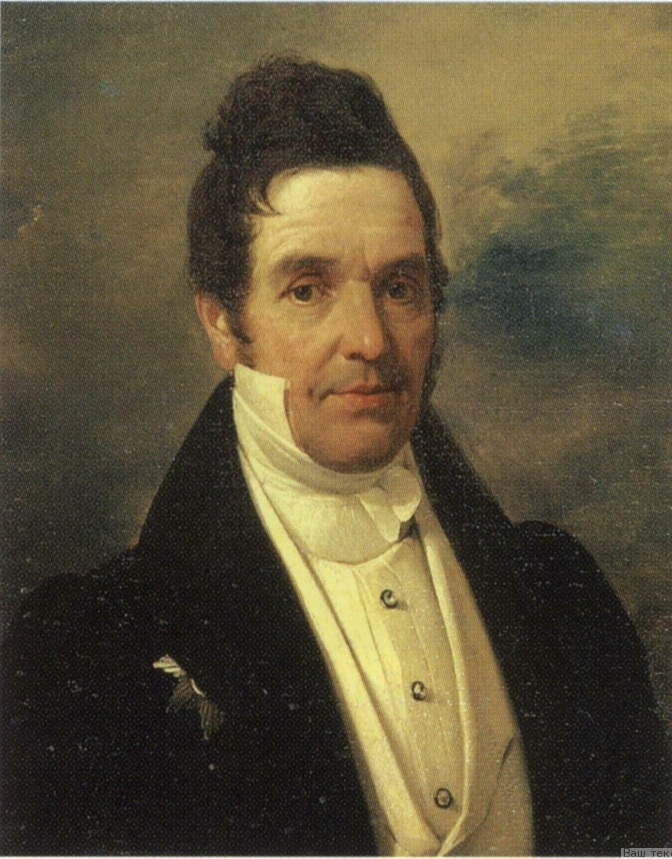
- Timofey Yefremovich Fan-der-Flit, painted by Pyotr Basin (1835, Russian Museum)

Olonets Governor
- In office 1825–1827
- Preceded by: Andrey Ivanovich Rykhlevsky
- Succeeded by: Vasily Gavrilovich Muratov

Kostroma Vice-Governor
- In office 1821–1824

Arkhangelsk Vice-Governor
- In office 1818–1821

Personal details
- Born: 16 July 1775 Saint Petersburg, Russian Empire
- Died: 2 September 1843 (aged 68) Saint Petersburg, Russian Empire
- Resting place: Smolensky Lutheran Cemetery
- Citizenship: Russian Empire
- Spouse: Tatyana Fyodorovna Sukhotina
- Children: Fyodor Timofeevich; Ekaterina Timofeevna; Anna Timofeevna; Alexandra Timofeevna
- Parent: Yefrem Ivanovich (father)
- Education: Naval Cadet Corps
- Awards: Order of Saint Vladimir (4th class); Order of Saint Anna (1st class); Order of Saint Stanislaus (1st class)
- Family: Fan-der-Flit

Timofey Yefremovich Fan-der-Flit, or Timotheus Van der Vliet (Russian: Тимофе́й Ефре́мович Фан-дер-Фли́т; 16 July 1775 – 2 September 1843) was a statesman of the Russian Empire, Privy Councillor and Olonets Governor.

== Biography ==
His ancestors were merchants who moved in the first half of the 18th century from Holland to Arkhangelsk. Born in Saint Petersburg, in the family of Yefrem Ivanovich Fan-der-Flit, the head of the border guard and director of the Kronstadt customs.

After graduating from the Saint Petersburg Naval Cadet Corps in 1790, he served in the Imperial Navy.

In 1804, he retired with the rank of captain lieutenant and served in the Ministry of Finance.

In 1812, he was initiated into Freemasonry in the Saint Petersburg Lodge of "Елизаветы к добродетели".

Since 1816, he was appointed director of the Onega Timber Exchange in the Arkhangelsk Governorate.

In 1818, he was appointed vice-governor of the Arkhangelsk Governorate.

Between 1821 and 1824 he served as the vice-governor of the Kostroma Governorate.

From October 1825 to September 1827 he was governor of the Olonets Governorate.

From 1827 he was a member of the Council of the State Audit Office of the Ministry of Finance.

In 1828, he was granted nobility.

In 1841, he retired with the rank of privy councillor.

He was familiar with Alexander Pushkin, and he was friends with the Decembrist poet Fyodor Glinka, who was exiled to Petrozavodsk.

He died on 2 September 1843 in Saint Petersburg. He was buried at the Smolensky Lutheran Cemetery.

== Family ==
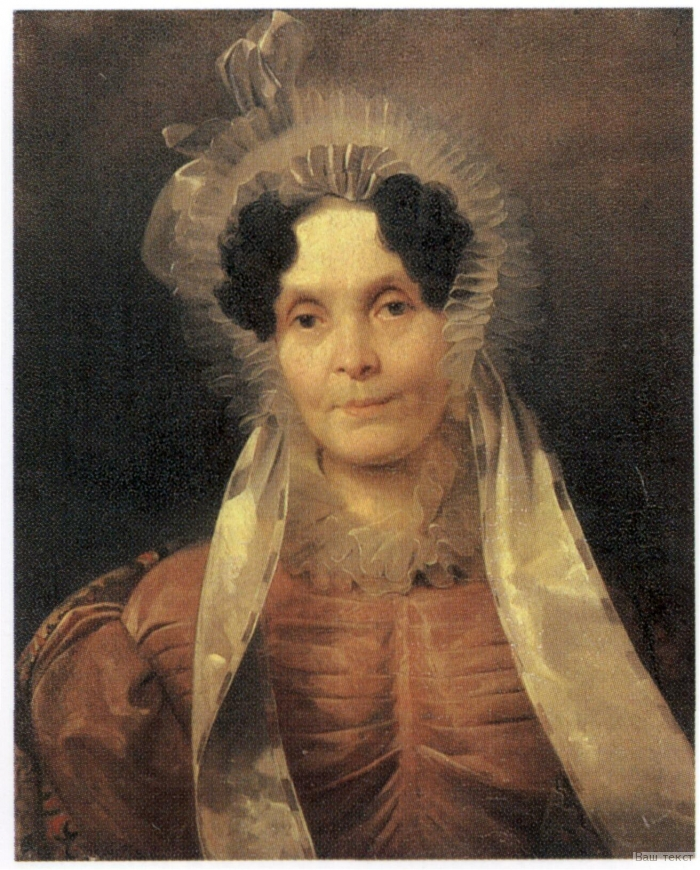
His wife, Tatiana Fedorovna

He was married to Tatyana Fyodorovna Sukhotina (1776—1854), daughter of major Fyodor Grigorievich Sukhotin (1743—1814), from the marriage to Anna Nikolaevna Sokovnina. Their children:

- Fyodor Timofeevich (1810—1873), senator, director of the Chancellery of the Ministry of Finance.
- Ekaterina Timofeevna (1812—1877), in her youth, Nestor Kukolnik was in love with her and sang her under the name "Lenora". In 1835, she was married to Rear Admiral Mikhail Petrovich Lazarev (1788-1851).
- Anna Timofeevna (1814—?), married to colonel Mikhail Nikolaevich Depreradovich (1807—1873).
- Alexandra Timofeevna (1818—1859), married since 13 November 1838 to Nikolai Aleksandrovich Aledinsky (1813—1868), the son of general Alexander Pavlovich Aledinsky.

== Literature ==
- Русский биографический словарь: В 25 т. / под наблюдением А. А. Половцова. 1896–1918.
- Мошина Т. А. Олонецкий губернатор Т. Е. Фан-дер-Флит // Север. 1988. No. 2;
- Серков А. И. Русское масонство. 1731—2000 гг. Энциклопедический словарь. — М.: Российская политическая энциклопедия, 2001.
- Краско А. Русские страницы в истории рода Van der Vliet // Голландцы и бельгийцы в России XVIII—XX веков. СПб., 2004;
- Кораблёв Н. А., Т. А. Мошина. Олонецкие губернаторы и генерал-губернаторы: Биографический справочник. — Петрозаводск: «Строительный стандарт», 2012. — С. 50–55. — 140 с. — ISBN 5-87870-010-7.
