= Gunnar Jakobsson =

Finnish figure skater

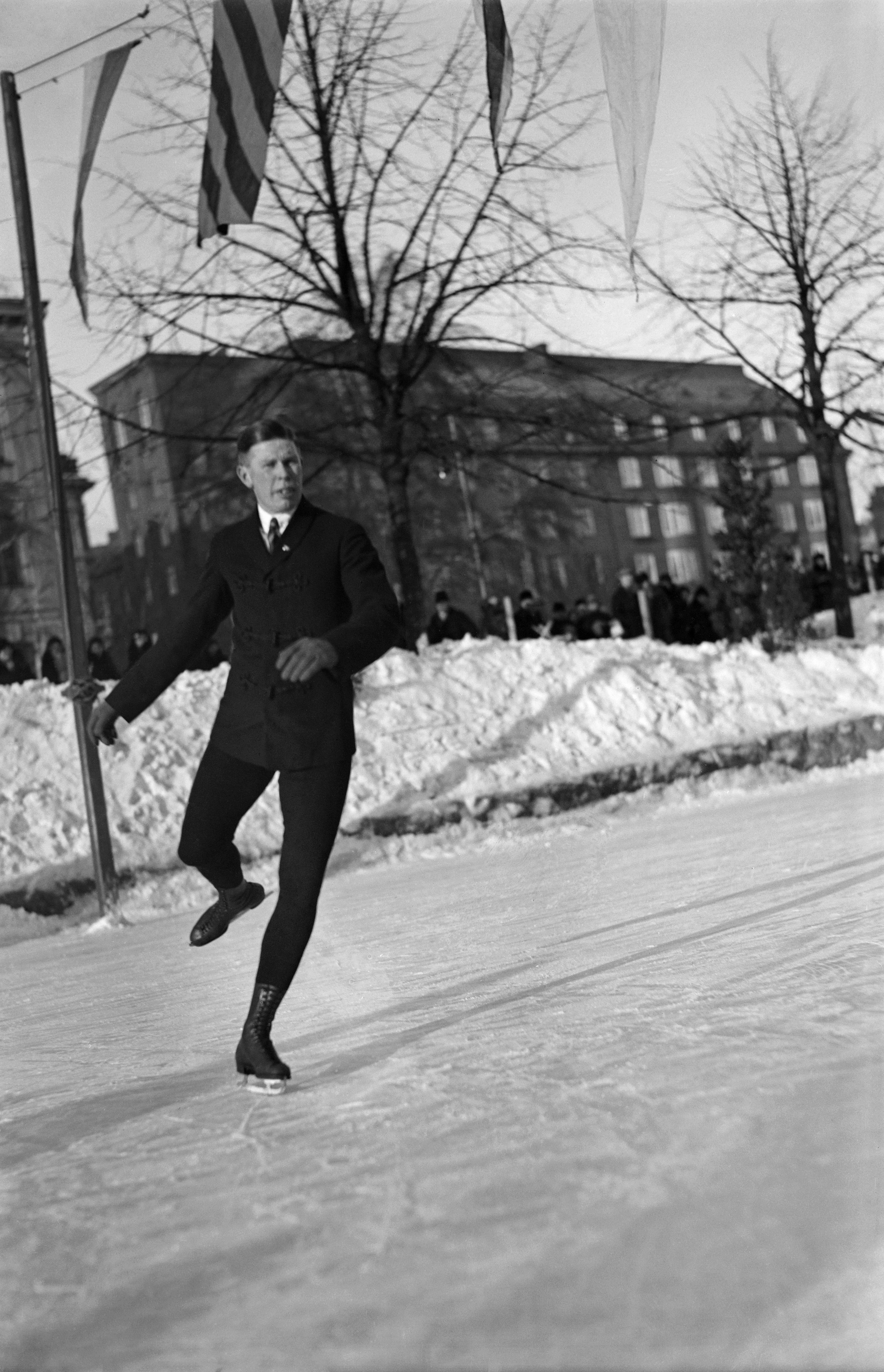

Figure skating career
- Country: Finland
Medal record
Representing Finland
Men's figure skating
European Championships
Bronze medal – third place	1923 Oslo	Men

Gunnar Jakobsson was a Finnish figure skater who competed in men's singles.

He won the bronze medal at the 1923 European Figure Skating Championships in Oslo.

== Competitive highlights ==
Event	1919	1920	1921	1922	1923	1924	1925	1926	1927	1928	1932
European Championships				7th	3rd			5th			
Finnish Championships	2nd		3rd	2nd	1st	2nd			2nd	2nd	1st
