= Bernard Fox (figure skater) =

American figure skater (1916–1998)

Personal information
- Full name: Matthew Bernard Fox
- Born: October 6, 1916
- Died: October 3, 1998 (aged 81)

Figure skating career
- Country: United States
- Discipline: Men's singles, Pairs
- Partner: Joan Tozzer
- Skating club: SC of Boston
- Retired: 1940
Medal record
North American Championships
Gold medal – first place	1939 Toronto	Pairs

Matthew Bernard Fox (Babe, Ben) (October 6, 1916 – October 3, 1998) was an American figure skater who competed in single skating and pair skating. His pairs partner was Joan Tozzer. They won the United States Figure Skating Championships pairs title in 1938, 1939, and 1940. Fox was the 1936 U.S. Champion in both singles and pairs on the junior level. He received his bachelor's degree from Harvard University, class of 1938. After service in the U. S. Navy in World War II, he had a long career in television, first in programming at the Dumont Network in New York City and then in Los Angeles, where, under the name Ben Fox, he created and produced "Waterfront" (starring Preston Foster) and other series.

He was first husband of Lucy Pope, later wife of tennis coach Harry Hopman.

== Results ==
men's singles

Event	1936
U.S. Championships	1st J

pairs with Joan Tozzer

Event	1937	1938	1939	1940
North American Championships			1st	
U.S. Championships	3rd	1st	1st	1st
