= Alfred Berger =

Austrian pair skater

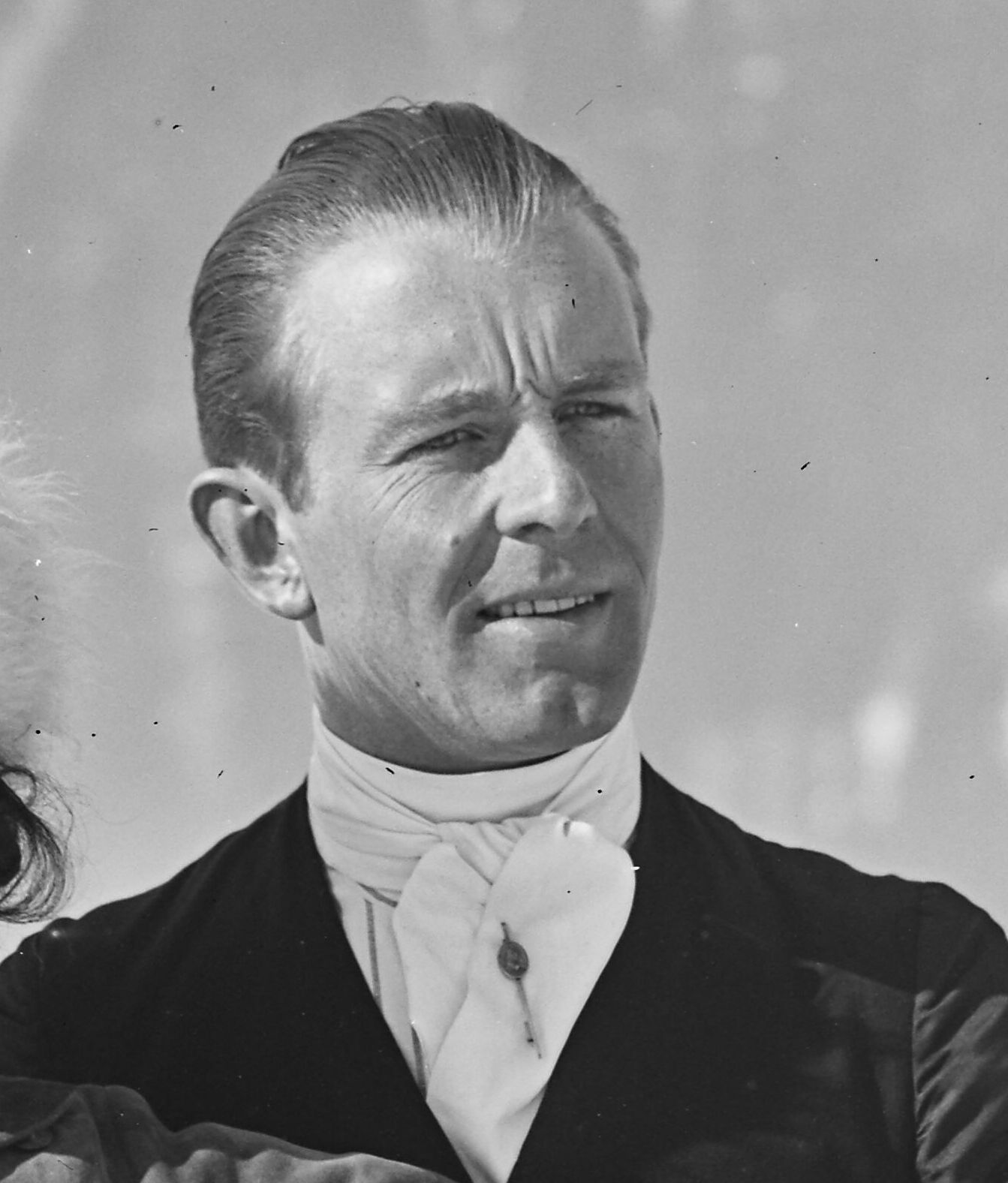
- Berger in 1924

Personal information
- Born: 25 August 1894 Vienna, Austria
- Died: 11 June 1966 (aged 71)

Figure skating career
- Country: Austria
- Partner: Helene Engelmann
- Retired: 1924
Medal record
Figure skating: Pairs
Representing Austria
Olympic Games
Gold medal – first place	1924 Chamonix	Pairs
World Championships
Gold medal – first place	1924 Manchester	Pairs
Gold medal – first place	1922 Davos	Pairs

Alfred Berger (25 August 1894 – 11 June 1966) was an Austrian pair skater. With his skating partner, Helene Engelmann, he became the 1924 Olympic champion and a two-time world champion (1922, 1924).

== Results ==
with Helene Engelmann

International
Event	1921	1922	1923	1924
Winter Olympics				1st
World Championships		1st		1st
National
Austrian Championships	1st	1st	1st	
