= Helene Engelmann =

Austrian pair skater

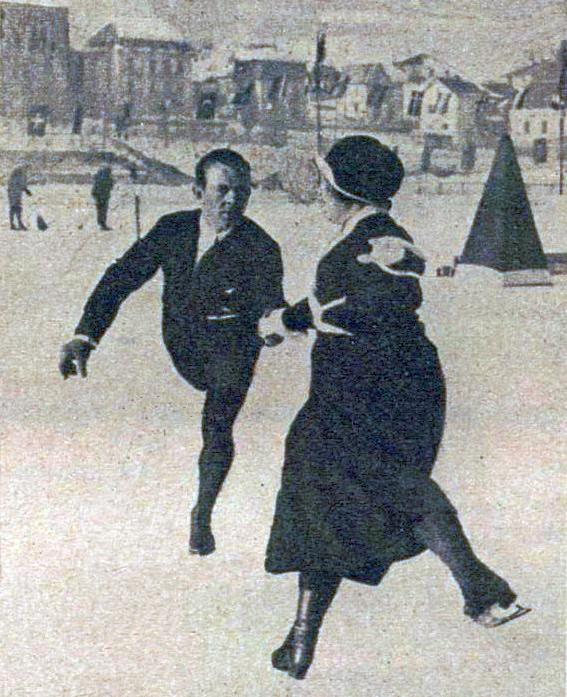
- Alfred Berger and Helene Engelmann

Personal information
- Other names: Helene Jaroschka
- Born: 9 February 1898 Vienna, Austria-Hungary
- Died: 1 August 1985 (aged 87) Vienna, Austria

Figure skating career
- Country: Austria
- Retired: 1924
Medal record
Representing Austria
Figure skating: Pairs
Olympic Games
Gold medal – first place	1924 Chamonix	Pairs
World Championships
Gold medal – first place	1924 Manchester	Pairs
Gold medal – first place	1922 Davos	Pairs
Silver medal – second place	1914 St. Moritz	Pairs
Gold medal – first place	1913 Stockholm	Pairs

Helene Engelmann (later Jaroschka; 9 February 1898 – 1 August 1985) was an Austrian pair skater. With Alfred Berger, she became the 1924 Olympic champion and a two-time world champion. She also won a world title with Karl Mejstrik.

== Life and career ==
Engelmann was the daughter of Eduard Engelmann Jr., a three-time champion at the European Figure Skating Championships. She began skating as a small child, having been introduced to the sport at an early age.

Aged 15, she won the pair skating title at the 1913 World Championships with her skating partner Karl Mejstrik. She remains the youngest-ever world champion in the pair category.

Engelmann also won World titles in 1922 and 1924 with partner Alfred Berger. They won gold at the 1924 Winter Olympics in Chamonix, France. Engelmann did not compete at the European Championships, as her father did, because the pair category was not included until 1930.

== Results ==
=== With Alfred Berger ===
International
Event	1921	1922	1923	1924
Winter Olympics				1st
World Championships		1st		1st
National
Austrian Championships	1st	1st	1st	

=== With Karl Mejstrik ===
International
Event	1913	1914
World Championships	1st	2nd
National
Austrian Championships	1st	2nd
