= Fan-der-Flit =

Fan-der-Flit Фан-дер-Флит Dutch: Van der Vliet
- Noble family

The Fan-der-Flit family (Russian: Фан-дер-Флит, Dutch: Van der Vliet) is a Russian noble family.

== History ==
At first, it was a merchant family of Dutch origin. The noble branch, descendant of Timofey Yefremovich Fan-der-Flit, who entered the service in 1790 and was promoted to the rank privy Councillor, on 2 November 1828, was awarded nobility with a diploma, from which a copy is held in the Herold Office.

== Description of the coat of arms ==
The shield is divided horizontally into two parts, in the upper part, in the black field, there is a lion holding a silver arrow in its paw, pointing upward, and in the lower part, in the silver field, a ship at sea with outstretched sails sailing to the left.

The shield is topped by a noble helmet and a crown with three ostrich feathers. The mantling on the shield is red and black, enclosed in silver.

== Family representatives ==
- Ivan (Johannes) Fan-der-Flit
  - Peter Ivanovich
    - Pyotr Petrovich (1839—1904) — Russian physicist, professor since 1880 of the Saint Petersburg State University
      - Alexander Petrovich (1870—1941) — famous Russian engineer and mechanical scientist
    - Konstantin Petrovich (1844—1933) — Russian military leader
  - Yefrem Ivanovich
    - Timofey Yefremovich (1775—1843) — Arkhangelsk vice-governor, Olonets governor
      - Fyodor Timofeevich (1810—1873)
        - Nikolay Fyodorovich (1840—1896) — director of the Russian Steam Navigation and Trading Company (1884—1894), patron
      - Ekaterina Timofeevna (1812—1877) ∞ Mikhail Petrovich Lazarev (1788—1851) — admiral
    - Alexandra Yefremovna ∞ Alexei Mikhailovich Kornilov (1760—1843)
      - Vladimir Alexeyevich Kornilov (1806—1854) — vice-admiral, hero of the defense of Sevastopol

== Literature ==
- Герб Фан-дер-Флита внесен в "Часть 10 Общего гербовника дворянских родов Всероссийской империи, стр. 136". Archived from the original on 2016-03-04.
- Род:Фан-дер-Флит on Rodovid
- Левин Натан Феликсович. "Общественная и благотворительная деятельность супругов Фан-дер-Флит".
