= Joan Tozzer =

American figure skater (1921–2012)

Personal information
- Born: September 19, 1921 Boston, Massachusetts
- Died: April 15, 2012 (aged 90) Dedham, Massachusetts

Figure skating career
- Country: United States
- Partner: Bernard Fox
- Skating club: SC of Boston
- Retired: 1940
Medal record
Representing United States
Ladies' Figure skating
North American Championships
| Silver medal – second place | 1939 Toronto | Ladies' singles |
Pairs' Figure skating
North American Championships
| Gold medal – first place | 1939 Toronto | Pairs |

Joan Tozzer Cave (September 19, 1921 – April 15, 2012) was an American figure skater who competed in single skating and pair skating. She was born to Alfred Marston (1877–1954) and Margaret (née Castle, 1886–1979) Tozzer. Her pairs partner was Bernard Fox. She won the United States Figure Skating Championships in both singles and pairs in 1938, 1939, and 1940. Tozzer was the U.S. novice national champion in 1934 and the junior national champion in 1937.

Her father was anthropologist Alfred Tozzer. She was inducted into the United States Figure Skating Hall of Fame in 1997.

== Results ==
=== Ladies Singles ===
| Event | 1936 | 1937 | 1938 | 1939 | 1940 |
|---|---|---|---|---|---|
| North American Championships | | | | 2nd | |
| U.S. Championships | 2nd J | 1st J | 1st | 1st | 1st |

=== Pairs (with Fox) ===
| Event | 1937 | 1938 | 1939 | 1940 |
|---|---|---|---|---|
| North American Championships | | | 1st | |
| U.S. Championships | 3rd | 1st | 1st | 1st |
