= Paul Metzner =

German figure skater

Figure skating career
- Country: Germany
Medal record
Representing Germany
Figure skating: Pairs
World Championships
Bronze medal – third place	1922 Davos	Pairs

Paul Metzner was a German figure skater who competed in men's singles and pair skating.

With Margarete Metzner, he won the bronze medal at the 1922 World Figure Skating Championships in pairs skating.

== Competitive highlights ==
=== Pairs ===
With Margarete Klebe / Margarete Metzner

Event	1920	1922
World Championships		3rd
German Championships	1st	
