= Fritz Kachler =

Austrian figure skater

Personal information
- Full name: Friedrich Kachler
- Other names: "Fritz"
- Born: 12 January 1888 Vienna, Austria-Hungary
- Died: 14 May 1973 (aged 85) Vienna, Austria
- Home town: Vienna, Austria

Figure skating career
- Country: Austria
Medal record
Representing Austria
Men's Figure skating
World Championships
Gold medal – first place	1912 Manchester	Men's singles
Gold medal – first place	1913 Vienna	Men's singles
Gold medal – first place	1923 Stockholm	Men's singles
Silver medal – second place	1914 Helsinki	Men's singles
Silver medal – second place	1922 Stockholm	Men's singles
Silver medal – second place	1925 Vienna	Men's singles
Bronze medal – third place	1911 Troppau	Men's singles
European Championships
Gold medal – first place	1914 Vienna	Men's singles
Gold medal – first place	1924 Davos	Men's singles
Silver medal – second place	1922 Stockholm	Men's singles

Fritz Kachler was an Austrian figure skater. He was the 1912, 1913, and 1923 World champion and the 1914 and 1924 European champion.

He did not believe that sport and nationalism should be mixed, and therefore chose not to participate in the Olympic Games of 1920 and 1924. He acted as a judge in the World Figure Skating Championships of 1926 (men, pairs), 1927 (men) and 1937 (women).

A mechanical engineer, he rose to become head of the Vienna/Lower Austria section of the Austrian Railways, after having been dismissed by the Nazis.

He is buried in the Eisenstaedter family grave (plot 12G) in the Doeblinger Cemetery, Vienna, with his wife Margarethe Eisenstädter.

== Competitive highlights ==
International
Event	1909	1910	1911	1912	1913	1914	1922	1923	1924	1925
World Championships			3rd	1st	1st	2nd	2nd	1st		2nd
European Championships						1st	2nd		1st	
National
Austrian Championships	2nd	1st	1st	1st						1st
