= Eduard Engelmann Jr. =

Austrian figure skater, engineer, and cyclist (1864–1944)

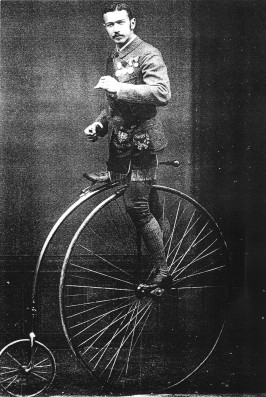
- Eduard Engelmann Jr.

Figure skating career
- Country: Austria
Medal record
Representing Austria
Men's Figure skating
European Championships
| Gold medal – first place | 1894 Vienna | Men's singles |
| Gold medal – first place | 1893 Berlin | Men's singles |
| Gold medal – first place | 1892 Vienna | Men's singles |

Eduard Engelmann Jr. (14 July 1864 – 31 October 1944) was an Austrian figure skater, engineer, and cyclist. He was a three-time gold medallist at the European Figure Skating Championships. He had three children, all of whom became figure skaters: Edi, Helene and Christine, who married Karl Schäfer.

== Figure skating competition ==
The Olympic Games and World Championships were not yet established in Engelmann's time.

| Event | 1892 | 1893 | 1894 |
|---|---|---|---|
| European Championships | 1st | 1st | 1st |

== Engineering ==
Engelmann studied at the Vienna University of Technology, specializing in railway engineering. He built the Kraftwerk Wienerbruck power station, the Landessiechenanstalt Oberhollabrunn hospital, and was manager of the Niederösterreichischen Eisenbahnamtes (Lower Austrian Railway office) of the Mariazellerbahn.

In 1909, he built the first ever artificial ice rink on land, which was established as an ice rink by his father Eduard Engelmann Sr., in the Hernals district of Vienna. In 1912, he built, in Vienna's Heumarkt district, what was at the time the largest artificial ice rink in Europe. The rink was improved on in later years; in 1932, the ice rink covered 3,000 square meters. He built another rink in Budapest in 1922.

In 1944, shortly after his death, the rink he built in Vienna-Hernals was bombed and totally destroyed. It was rebuilt after World War II and reopened in 1946; today, the location holds a supermarket, which, since 1974, has had an artificial ice rink attached.

== Other ==
As a cyclist, Engelmann was one of the founders of the Wiener Cyclisten-Clubs (Cyclists Clubs of Vienna). He won the cycling championships for unicyclists three times in the German cyclists' union.
