= Ernst Oppacher =

Austrian figure skater

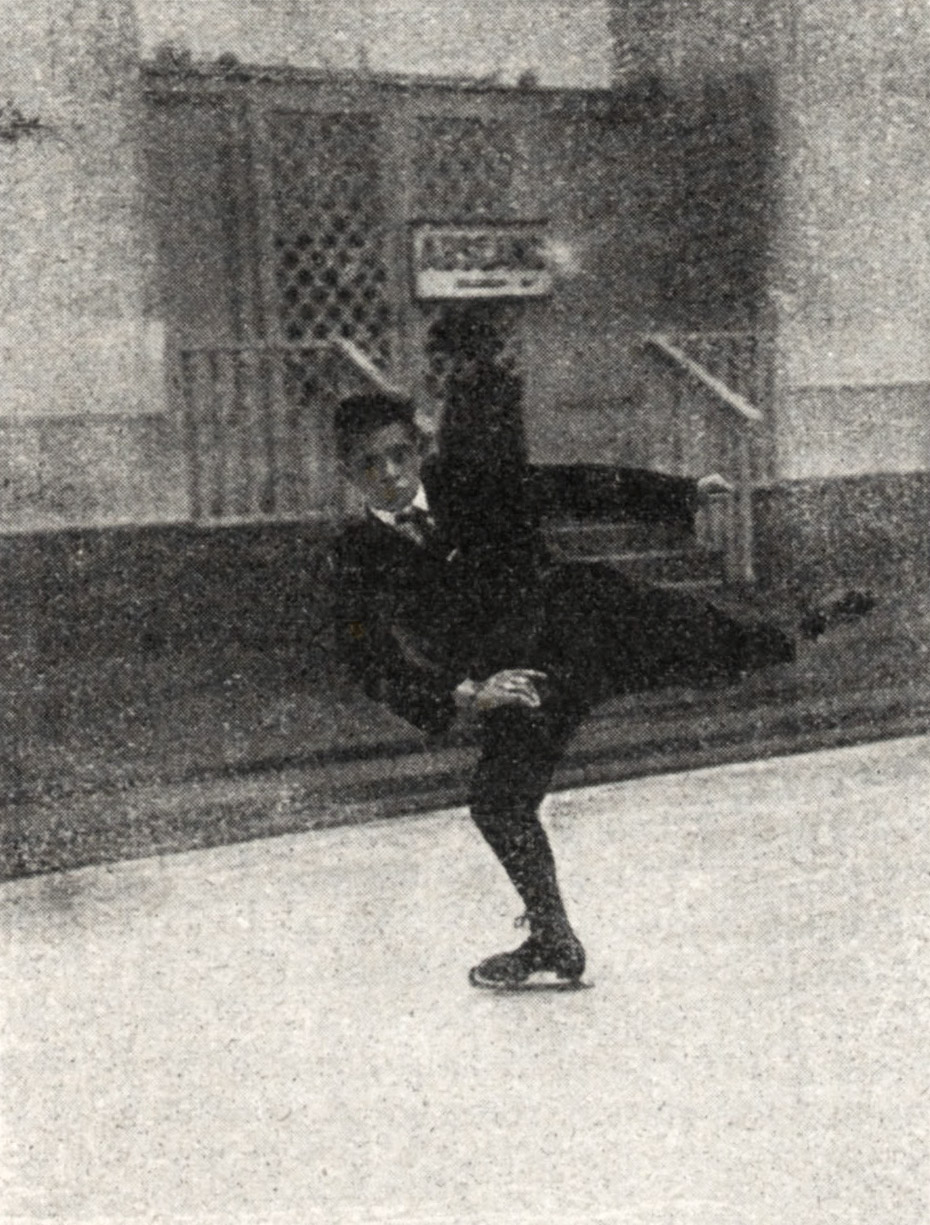
- Ernst Oppacher training in 1913

Personal information
- Full name: Ernst Oppacher

Figure skating career
- Country: Austria
Medal record
Representing Austria
Men's Figure skating
World Championships
Bronze medal – third place	1924 Stockholm	Men's singles
European Championships
Bronze medal – third place	1922 Davos	Men's singles

Ernst Oppacher was an Austrian singles figure skater and the 1921 and 1922 Austrian national champion. He won the bronze medal at the 1924 Worlds and the 1922 Europeans.

== Competitive highlights ==
International
Event	1912	1913	1914	1921	1922	1923	1924	1925	1926	1927
World Championships		5th	4th			4th	3rd	4th		
European Championships			4th		3rd					4th
National
Austrian Championships	2nd	2nd	2nd	1st	1st	2nd				3rd
