= European Figure Skating Championships =

European figure skating competition

- Status: Active
- Genre: International championship event
- Frequency: Annual
- Inaugurated: 1891
- Previous event: 2026 European Championships
- Next event: 2027 European Championships
- Organiser: International Skating Union

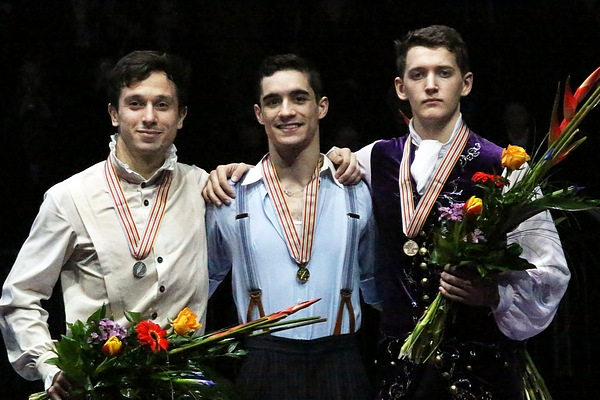
The gold, silver, and bronze medalists in the men's event at the 2016 European Championships: Javier Fernández of Spain (center), Alexei Bychenko of Israel (left), and Maxim Kovtun of Russia (right)

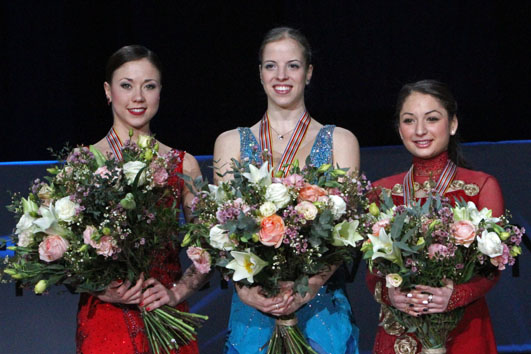
The gold, silver, and bronze medalists in the women's event at the 2010 European Championships: Carolina Kostner of Italy (center), Laura Lepistö of Finland (left), and Elene Gedevanishvili of Georgia (right)

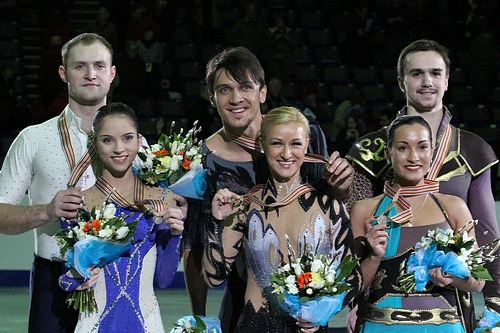
The gold, silver, and bronze medalists in the pairs event at the 2012 European Championships: Tatiana Volosozhar and Maxim Trankov of Russia (center), Vera Bazarova and Yuri Larionov of Russia (left), and Ksenia Stolbova and Fedor Klimov of Russia (right)

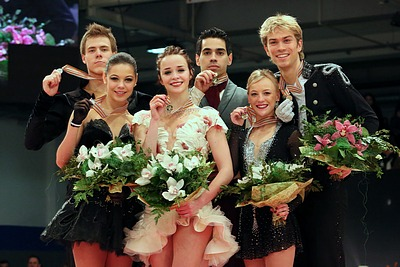
The gold, silver, and bronze medalists in the ice dance event at the 2014 European Championships: Anna Cappellini and Luca Lanotte of Italy (center), Elena Ilinykh and Nikita Katsalapov of Russia (left), and Penny Coomes and Nicholas Buckland of Great Britain (right)

The European Figure Skating Championships are an annual figure skating competition sanctioned by the International Skating Union (ISU). They are figure skating's oldest competition. The first European Championships were held in 1891 in Hamburg, Germany, and featured only one segment – compulsory figures – with seven competitors. They have only been interrupted five times since 1891. Women were allowed to compete for the first time in 1930, which was also when pair skating was added to the competition. Ice dance was added in 1954. Only eligible skaters from ISU member countries in Europe are allowed to compete, while skaters from countries outside of Europe instead compete at the Four Continents Figure Skating Championships.

Medals are awarded in men's singles, women's singles, pair skating, and ice dance. Ulrich Salchow of Sweden holds the record for winning the most European Championship titles in men's singles (with nine), while Irina Slutskaya of Russia holds the record in women's singles (with seven). Irina Rodnina and Alexander Zaitsev of the Soviet Union hold the record in pair skating (with seven), although Rodnina won an additional four titles with a previous partner. Lyudmila Pakhomova and Aleksandr Gorshkov of the Soviet Union hold the record in ice dance (with six), while Guillaume Cizeron of France has also won six titles in ice dance, but not with the same partner.

== History ==
Although they have not been held continuously, the European Championships are the oldest championship competition in figure skating. The first European Championships were held in 1891 in Hamburg, Germany, and featured only one segment: compulsory figures. The event was sponsored by the skating federations of Austria and Germany after they had combined to become one federation. All of the medalists were from Germany: Oskar Uhlig won the first gold medal, A. Schmitson finished in second place, and Franz Zilly was third.

The 1893 European Championships were the first to be held under the jurisdiction of the International Skating Union (ISU), which had formed in the summer of 1892. The championships were sponsored by the Berlin Skating Club and organized by the German/Austrian federation. Figure skating historian James Hines called the 1893 European Championships "clearly a success from a skating standpoint", but it also marked figure skating's "first major controversy", due to "different interpretations of the scoring rules, which could result in a tie depending upon one's interpretation of them". The Berlin Skating Club had declared Henning Grenander the winner, but the ISU declared Eduard Engelmann Jr. of Austria the winner. According to Hines, the discrepancy in scoring was due to the interpretation of the scoring rules, resulting in a possible tie. The problem was never resolved, but in 1895, the ISU declared the 1893 results invalid and rules were established that made sure that discrepancies due to differences in scoring interpretations could not occur again. ISU historian Benjamin T. Wright said that the controversy "nearly led to the demise" of the newly formed ISU.

The next two European Championships, 1894 and 1895, "experienced a marked decrease in participation, perhaps a result of the scoring debacle". There were no European Championships for two years, which Hines speculated was due to the small number of contestants in 1894 and 1895, although the competition returned in 1898. Hines also reported that the European Championships were cancelled in 1902 and 1903 "for lack of ice". By the beginning of World War I, twenty European Championships had been held. There were three more interruptions of the European Championships: between 1915 and 1922 due to World War I, between 1940 and 1946 due to World War II, and in 2021 due to the COVID-19 pandemic.

Only men competed at the European Championships until 1930, when women's singles and pair skating were added. Members of all ISU nations, not just those from Europe, were allowed to compete at the Europeans Championships until 1948. After Barbara Ann Scott of Canada and Dick Button of the United States won the 1948 European Championships, while Eva Pawlik of Austria and Hans Gerschwiler of Switzerland were awarded the silver medals, the competition was restricted to European skaters. Ice dance was added in 1954. Competitions were held in outdoor rinks until 1967, when the ISU ruled that both the European and World Championships had to be held in covered ice rinks.

The 2027 European Championships are scheduled to be held from 25 to 31 January in Lausanne, Switzerland.

== Qualifying ==
Only competitors who are "members of a European ISU Member" are eligible to compete in the European Championships. Each ISU member country can submit at least one competitor per discipline, with a maximum of three competitors per discipline if they have earned the minimum total element scores, which is determined and published each season by the ISU, during the current or immediately previous season.

Age restrictions have changed throughout the history of the European Championships. Until the 2023–24 figure skating season, skaters had to be at least 15 years old before 1 July of the previous year. At the ISU Congress held in June 2022, members of the ISU Council accepted a proposal to gradually increase the minimum age limit for senior competition to 17 beginning with the 2024–25 season. To avoid forcing skaters who had already competed in the senior category to return to juniors, the age limit remained unchanged during the 2022–23 season, before increasing to 16 during the 2023–24 season, and then to 17 during the 2024–25 season.

== Medalists ==
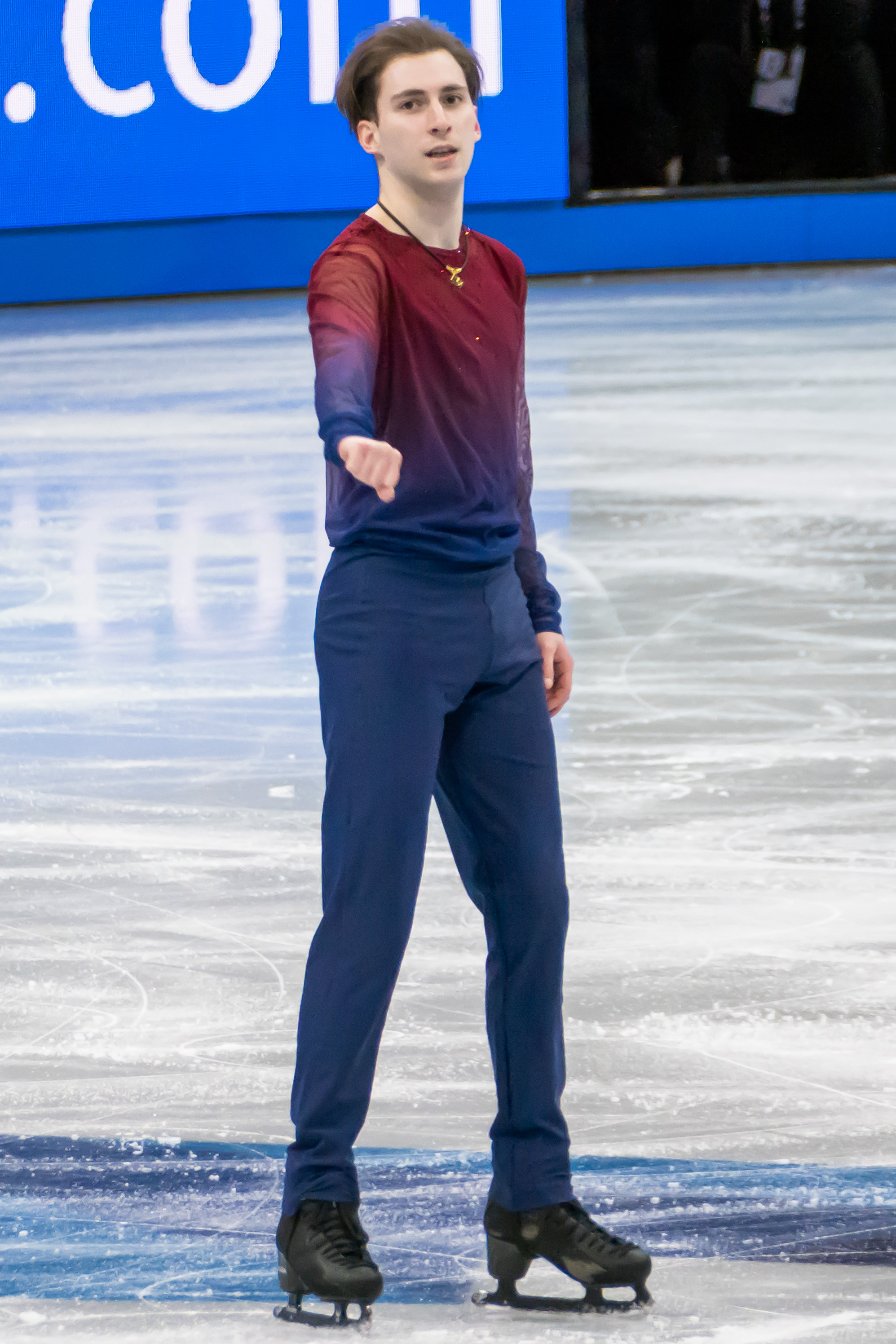
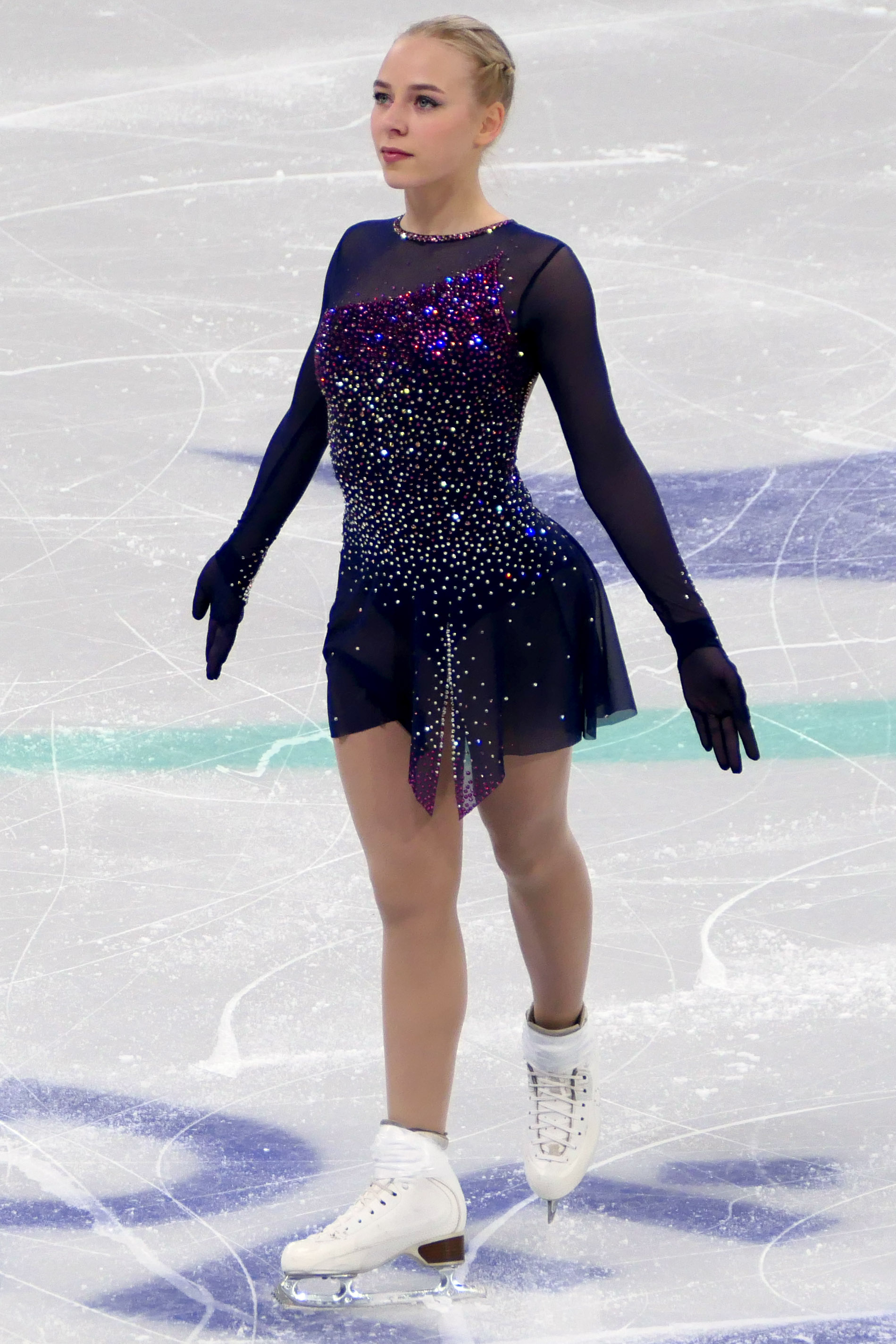
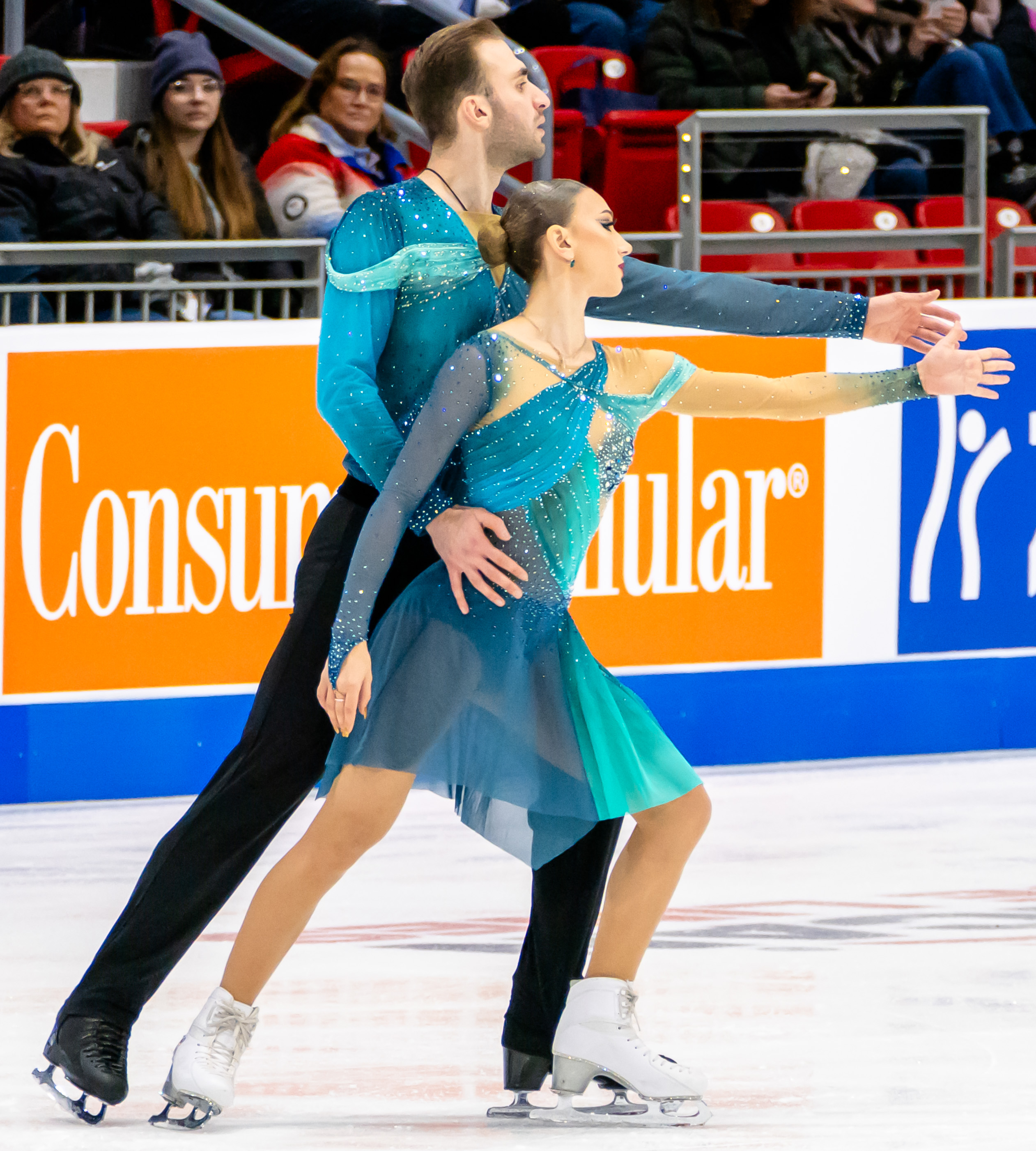
The reigning European figure skating champions: Nika Egadze of Georgia (men's singles); Niina Petrõkina of Estonia (women's singles); and Anastasiia Metelkina and Luka Berulava of Georgia (pair skating)
Not pictured: Laurence Fournier Beaudry and Guillaume Cizeron of France (ice dance)

=== Men's singles ===
Men's event medalists
Year	Location	Gold	Silver	Bronze	Ref.
1891	(German Empire) Hamburg	(Germany) Oskar Uhlig	(Germany) Anon Schmitson	(Germany) Franz Zilly	
1892	(Austria-Hungary) Vienna	(Austria) Eduard Engelmann	(Hungary) Tibor von Földváry	(Austria) Georg Zachariades	
1893	(German Empire) Berlin	(Austria) Eduard Engelmann	(Sweden) Henning Grenander	(Austria) Georg Zachariades	
1894	(Austria-Hungary) Vienna	(Austria) Eduard Engelmann	(Austria) Gustav Hügel	(Hungary) Tibor von Földváry	
1895	(Austria-Hungary) Budapest	(Hungary) Tibor von Földváry	(Austria) Gustav Hügel	(Germany) Gilbert Fuchs	
1896–97	Competition discontinued in favour of the World Championships				
1898	(Norway) Trondheim	(Sweden) Ulrich Salchow	(Norway) Johan Lefstad	(Norway) Oscar Holthe	
1899	(Switzerland) Davos	(Sweden) Ulrich Salchow	(Austria) Gustav Hügel	(Austria) Ernst Fellner	
1900	(German Empire) Berlin	(Sweden) Ulrich Salchow	(Austria) Gustav Hügel	(Norway) Oscar Holthe	
1901	(Austria-Hungary) Vienna	(Austria) Gustav Hügel	(Germany) Gilbert Fuchs	(Sweden) Ulrich Salchow	
1902–03	(Netherlands) Amsterdam (Note: The 1903 European Championships were first reassigned to Stockholm, Sweden, before they were ultimately cancelled due to a small number of entrants.)	Competitions cancelled due to lack of ice			
1904	(Switzerland) Davos	(Sweden) Ulrich Salchow	(Austria) Max Bohatsch	(Russia) Nikolai Panin Kolomenkin	
1905	(German Empire) Bonn	(Austria) Max Bohatsch	(Germany) Heinrich Burger	(Germany) Karl Zenger	
1906	(Switzerland) Davos	(Sweden) Ulrich Salchow	(Austria) Ernst Herz	(Sweden) Per Thorén	
1907	(German Empire) Berlin	(Sweden) Ulrich Salchow	(Germany) Gilbert Fuchs	(Austria) Ernst Herz	
1908	(Russia) Warsaw	(Austria) Ernst Herz	(Russia) Nikolai Panin Kolomenkin	(Austria) Henryk Krukowicz-Przedrzymirski	
1909	(Austria-Hungary) Budapest	(Sweden) Ulrich Salchow	(Germany) Gilbert Fuchs	(Sweden) Per Thorén	
1910	(German Empire) Berlin	(Sweden) Ulrich Salchow	(Germany) Werner Rittberger	(Sweden) Per Thorén	
1911	(Russia) St. Petersburg	(Sweden) Per Thorén	(Russia) Karl Ollo	(Germany) Werner Rittberger	
1912	(Sweden) Stockholm	(Sweden) Gösta Sandahl	(Russia) Ivan Malinin	(Norway) Martin Stixrud	
1913	(Norway) Kristiania	(Sweden) Ulrich Salchow	(Hungary) Andor Szende	(Austria) Willy Böckl	
1914	(Austria-Hungary) Vienna	(Austria) Fritz Kachler	(Norway) Andreas Krogh	(Austria) Willy Böckl	
1915–21	No competitions due to World War I				
1922	(Switzerland) Davos	(Austria) Willy Böckl	(Austria) Fritz Kachler	(Austria) Ernst Oppacher	
1923	(Norway) Kristiania	(Austria) Willy Böckl	(Norway) Martin Stixrud	(Finland) Gunnar Jakobsson	
1924	(Switzerland) Davos	(Austria) Fritz Kachler	(Austria) Ludwig Wrede	(Germany) Werner Rittberger	
1925	(Germany) Triberg	(Austria) Willy Böckl	(Germany) Werner Rittberger	(Austria) Otto Preißecker	
1926	(Switzerland) Davos	(Austria) Willy Böckl	(Austria) Otto Preißecker	(Switzerland) Georges Gautschi	
1927	(Austria) Vienna	(Austria) Willy Böckl	(Austria) Hugo Distler	(Austria) Karl Schäfer	
1928	(Czechoslovakia) Troppau	(Austria) Willy Böckl	(Austria) Karl Schäfer	(Austria) Otto Preißecker	
1929	(Switzerland) Davos	(Austria) Karl Schäfer	(Switzerland) Georges Gautschi	(Austria) Ludwig Wrede	
1930	(Germany) Berlin	(Austria) Karl Schäfer	(Czechoslovakia) Otto Gold	(Finland) Marcus Nikkanen	
1931	(Austria) Vienna	(Austria) Karl Schäfer	(Germany) Ernst Baier	(Austria) Hugo Distler	
1932	(France) Paris	(Austria) Karl Schäfer	(Germany) Ernst Baier	(Austria) Erich Erdös	
1933	(United Kingdom) London	(Austria) Karl Schäfer	(Germany) Ernst Baier	(Austria) Erich Erdös	
1934	(Austria) Seefeld in Tirol	(Austria) Karl Schäfer	(Hungary) Dénes Pataky	(Hungary) Elemér Terták	
1935	(Switzerland) St. Moritz	(Austria) Karl Schäfer	(Austria) Felix Kaspar	(Germany) Ernst Baier	
1936	(Germany) Berlin	(Austria) Karl Schäfer	(United Kingdom) Graham Sharp	(Germany) Ernst Baier	
1937	(Czechoslovakia) Prague	(Austria) Felix Kaspar	(United Kingdom) Graham Sharp	(Hungary) Elemér Terták	
1938	(Switzerland) St. Moritz	(Austria) Felix Kaspar	(United Kingdom) Graham Sharp	(Austria) Herbert Alward	
1939	(Switzerland) Davos	(United Kingdom) Graham Sharp	(United Kingdom) Freddie Tomlins	(Germany) Horst Faber	
1940–46	No competitions due to World War II				
1947	(Switzerland) Davos	(Switzerland) Hans Gerschwiler	(Czechoslovakia) Vladislav Čáp	(Belgium) Fernand Leemans	
1948	(Czechoslovakia) Prague	(United States) Dick Button	(Switzerland) Hans Gerschwiler	(Austria) Edi Rada	
1949	(Italy) Milan	(Austria) Edi Rada	(Hungary) Ede Király	(Austria) Hellmut Seibt	
1950	(Norway) Oslo	(Hungary) Ede Király	(Austria) Hellmut Seibt	(Italy) Carlo Fassi	
1951	(Switzerland) Zürich	(Austria) Hellmut Seibt	(West Germany) Horst Faber	(Italy) Carlo Fassi	
1952	(Austria) Vienna	(Austria) Hellmut Seibt	(Italy) Carlo Fassi	(United Kingdom) Michael Carrington	
1953	(West Germany) Dortmund	(Italy) Carlo Fassi	(France) Alain Giletti	(West Germany) Freimut Stein	
1954	(Italy) Bolzano	(Italy) Carlo Fassi	(France) Alain Giletti	(Czechoslovakia) Karol Divín	
1955	(Hungary) Budapest	(France) Alain Giletti	(United Kingdom) Michael Booker	(Czechoslovakia) Karol Divín	
1956	(France) Paris	(France) Alain Giletti	(United Kingdom) Michael Booker	(Czechoslovakia) Karol Divín	
1957	(Austria) Vienna	(France) Alain Giletti	(Czechoslovakia) Karol Divín	(United Kingdom) Michael Booker	
1958	(Czechoslovakia) Bratislava	(Czechoslovakia) Karol Divín	(France) Alain Giletti	(France) Alain Calmat	
1959	(Switzerland) Davos	(Czechoslovakia) Karol Divín	(France) Alain Giletti	(Austria) Norbert Felsinger	
1960	(West Germany) Garmisch-Partenkirchen	(France) Alain Giletti	(Austria) Norbert Felsinger	(West Germany) Manfred Schnelldorfer	
1961	(Germany) West Berlin	(France) Alain Giletti	(France) Alain Calmat	(West Germany) Manfred Schnelldorfer	
1962	(Switzerland) Geneva	(France) Alain Calmat	(Czechoslovakia) Karol Divín	(West Germany) Manfred Schnelldorfer	
1963	(Hungary) Budapest	(France) Alain Calmat	(West Germany) Manfred Schnelldorfer	(Austria) Emmerich Danzer	
1964	(France) Grenoble	(France) Alain Calmat	(West Germany) Manfred Schnelldorfer	(Czechoslovakia) Karol Divín	
1965	(Soviet Union) Moscow	(Austria) Emmerich Danzer	(France) Alain Calmat	(Austria) Peter Jonas	
1966	(Czechoslovakia) Bratislava	(Austria) Emmerich Danzer	(Austria) Wolfgang Schwarz	(Czechoslovakia) Ondrej Nepela	
1967	(Socialist Federal Republic of Yugoslavia) Ljubljana	(Austria) Emmerich Danzer	(Austria) Wolfgang Schwarz	(Czechoslovakia) Ondrej Nepela	
1968	(Sweden) Västerås	(Austria) Emmerich Danzer	(Austria) Wolfgang Schwarz	(Czechoslovakia) Ondrej Nepela	
1969	(West Germany) Garmisch-Partenkirchen	(Czechoslovakia) Ondrej Nepela	(France) Patrick Péra	(Soviet Union) Sergei Chetverukhin	
1970	(Soviet Union) Leningrad	(Czechoslovakia) Ondrej Nepela	(France) Patrick Péra	(East Germany) Günter Zöller	
1971	(Switzerland) Zürich	(Czechoslovakia) Ondrej Nepela	(Soviet Union) Sergei Chetverukhin	(United Kingdom) Haig Oundjian	
1972	(Sweden) Gothenburg	(Czechoslovakia) Ondrej Nepela	(Soviet Union) Sergei Chetverukhin	(France) Patrick Péra	
1973	(West Germany) Cologne	(Czechoslovakia) Ondrej Nepela	(Soviet Union) Sergei Chetverukhin	(East Germany) Jan Hoffmann	
1974	(Socialist Federal Republic of Yugoslavia) Zagreb	(East Germany) Jan Hoffmann	(Soviet Union) Sergei Volkov	(United Kingdom) John Curry	
1975	(Denmark) Copenhagen	(Soviet Union) Vladimir Kovalyov	(United Kingdom) John Curry	(Soviet Union) Yuri Ovchinnikov	
1976	(Switzerland) Geneva	(United Kingdom) John Curry	(Soviet Union) Vladimir Kovalyov	(East Germany) Jan Hoffmann	
1977	(Finland) Helsinki	(East Germany) Jan Hoffmann	(Soviet Union) Vladimir Kovalyov	(United Kingdom) Robin Cousins	
1978	(France) Strasbourg	(East Germany) Jan Hoffmann	(Soviet Union) Vladimir Kovalyov	(United Kingdom) Robin Cousins	
1979	(Socialist Federal Republic of Yugoslavia) Zagreb	(East Germany) Jan Hoffmann	(Soviet Union) Vladimir Kovalyov	(United Kingdom) Robin Cousins	
1980	(Sweden) Gothenburg	(United Kingdom) Robin Cousins	(East Germany) Jan Hoffmann	(Soviet Union) Vladimir Kovalyov	
1981	(Austria) Innsbruck	(Soviet Union) Igor Bobrin	(France) Jean-Christophe Simond	(West Germany) Norbert Schramm	
1982	(France) Lyon	(West Germany) Norbert Schramm	(France) Jean-Christophe Simond	(Soviet Union) Igor Bobrin	
1983	(West Germany) Dortmund	(West Germany) Norbert Schramm	(Czechoslovakia) Jozef Sabovčík	(Soviet Union) Alexandre Fadeev	
1984	(Hungary) Budapest	(Soviet Union) Alexandre Fadeev	(West Germany) Rudi Cerne	(West Germany) Norbert Schramm	
1985	(Sweden) Gothenburg	(Czechoslovakia) Jozef Sabovčík	(Soviet Union) Vladimir Kotin	(Poland) Grzegorz Filipowski	
1986	(Denmark) Copenhagen	(Czechoslovakia) Jozef Sabovčík	(Soviet Union) Vladimir Kotin	(Soviet Union) Alexandre Fadeev	
1987	(Socialist Federal Republic of Yugoslavia) Sarajevo	(Soviet Union) Alexandre Fadeev	(Soviet Union) Vladimir Kotin	(Soviet Union) Viktor Petrenko	
1988	(Czechoslovakia) Prague	(Soviet Union) Alexandre Fadeev	(Soviet Union) Vladimir Kotin	(Soviet Union) Viktor Petrenko	
1989	(United Kingdom) Birmingham	(Soviet Union) Alexandre Fadeev	(Poland) Grzegorz Filipowski	(Czechoslovakia) Petr Barna	
1990	(Soviet Union) Leningrad	(Soviet Union) Viktor Petrenko	(Czechoslovakia) Petr Barna	(Soviet Union) Vyacheslav Zahorodnyuk	
1991	(Bulgaria) Sofia	(Soviet Union) Viktor Petrenko	(Czechoslovakia) Petr Barna	(Soviet Union) Vyacheslav Zahorodnyuk	
1992	(Switzerland) Lausanne	(Czechoslovakia) Petr Barna	(Commonwealth of Independent States) Viktor Petrenko	(Commonwealth of Independent States) Alexei Urmanov	
1993	(Finland) Helsinki	(Ukraine) Dmytro Dmytrenko	(France) Philippe Candeloro	(France) Éric Millot	
1994	(Denmark) Copenhagen	(Ukraine) Viktor Petrenko	(Ukraine) Vyacheslav Zahorodnyuk	(Russia) Alexei Urmanov	
1995	(Germany) Dortmund	(Russia) Ilia Kulik	(Russia) Alexei Urmanov	(Ukraine) Vyacheslav Zahorodnyuk	
1996	(Bulgaria) Sofia	(Ukraine) Vyacheslav Zahorodnyuk	(Russia) Igor Pashkevich	(Russia) Ilia Kulik	
1997	(France) Paris	(Russia) Alexei Urmanov	(France) Philippe Candeloro	(Ukraine) Vyacheslav Zahorodnyuk	
1998	(Italy) Milan	(Russia) Alexei Yagudin	(Russia) Evgeni Plushenko	(Russia) Alexander Abt	
1999	(Czech Republic) Prague	(Russia) Alexei Yagudin	(Russia) Evgeni Plushenko	(Russia) Alexei Urmanov	
2000	(Austria) Vienna	(Russia) Evgeni Plushenko	(Russia) Alexei Yagudin	(Ukraine) Dmytro Dmytrenko	
2001	(Slovakia) Bratislava	(Russia) Evgeni Plushenko	(Russia) Alexei Yagudin	(France) Stanick Jeannette	
2002	(Switzerland) Lausanne	(Russia) Alexei Yagudin	(Russia) Alexander Abt	(France) Brian Joubert	
2003	(Sweden) Malmö	(Russia) Evgeni Plushenko	(France) Brian Joubert	(France) Stanick Jeannette	
2004	(Hungary) Budapest	(France) Brian Joubert	(Russia) Evgeni Plushenko	(Russia) Ilia Klimkin	
2005	(Italy) Turin	(Russia) Evgeni Plushenko	(France) Brian Joubert	(Germany) Stefan Lindemann	
2006	(France) Lyon	(Russia) Evgeni Plushenko	(Switzerland) Stéphane Lambiel	(France) Brian Joubert	
2007	(Poland) Warsaw	(France) Brian Joubert	(Czech Republic) Tomáš Verner	(Belgium) Kevin van der Perren	
2008	(Croatia) Zagreb	(Czech Republic) Tomáš Verner	(Switzerland) Stéphane Lambiel	(France) Brian Joubert	
2009	(Finland) Helsinki	(France) Brian Joubert	(Italy) Samuel Contesti	(Belgium) Kevin van der Perren	
2010	(Estonia) Tallinn	(Russia) Evgeni Plushenko	(Switzerland) Stéphane Lambiel	(France) Brian Joubert	
2011	(Switzerland) Bern	(France) Florent Amodio	(France) Brian Joubert	(Czech Republic) Tomáš Verner	
2012	(United Kingdom) Sheffield	(Russia) Evgeni Plushenko	(Russia) Artur Gachinski	(France) Florent Amodio	
2013	(Croatia) Zagreb	(Spain) Javier Fernández	(France) Florent Amodio	(Czech Republic) Michal Březina	
2014	(Hungary) Budapest	(Spain) Javier Fernández	(Russia) Sergei Voronov	(Russia) Konstantin Menshov	
2015	(Sweden) Stockholm	(Spain) Javier Fernández	(Russia) Maxim Kovtun	(Russia) Sergei Voronov	
2016	(Slovakia) Bratislava	(Spain) Javier Fernández	(Israel) Alexei Bychenko	(Russia) Maxim Kovtun	
2017	(Czech Republic) Ostrava	(Spain) Javier Fernández	(Russia) Maxim Kovtun	(Russia) Mikhail Kolyada	
2018	(Russia) Moscow	(Spain) Javier Fernández	(Russia) Dmitri Aliev	(Russia) Mikhail Kolyada	
2019	(Belarus) Minsk	(Spain) Javier Fernández	(Russia) Alexander Samarin	(Italy) Matteo Rizzo	
2020	(Austria) Graz	(Russia) Dmitri Aliev	(Russia) Artur Danielian	(Georgia (country)) Morisi Kvitelashvili	
2021	(Croatia) Zagreb	Competition cancelled due to the COVID-19 pandemic			
2022	(Estonia) Tallinn	(Russia) Mark Kondratiuk	(Italy) Daniel Grassl	(Latvia) Deniss Vasiļjevs	
2023	(Finland) Espoo	(France) Adam Siao Him Fa	(Italy) Matteo Rizzo	(Switzerland) Lukas Britschgi	
2024	(Lithuania) Kaunas	(France) Adam Siao Him Fa	(Estonia) Aleksandr Selevko	(Italy) Matteo Rizzo	
2025	(Estonia) Tallinn	(Switzerland) Lukas Britschgi	(Italy) Nikolaj Memola	(France) Adam Siao Him Fa	
2026	(United Kingdom) Sheffield	(Georgia (country)) Nika Egadze	(Italy) Matteo Rizzo	(Czech Republic) Georgii Reshtenko	

=== Women's singles ===
On 29 January 2024, the Court of Arbitration for Sport disqualified Kamila Valieva of Russia for four years retroactive to 25 December 2021 for an anti-doping violation. Thus, her scores from the 2022 European Championships were annulled. As a result, Anna Shcherbakova of Russia was elevated to gold medalist, Alexandra Trusova of Russia to silver, and Loena Hendrickx of Belgium to bronze, breaking what had otherwise been an all-Russian sweep of the women's podium that year.

Women's event medalists
Year	Location	Gold	Silver	Bronze	Ref.
1930	(Austria) Vienna	(Austria) Fritzi Burger	(Austria) Ilse Hornung	(Sweden) Vivi-Anne Hultén	
1931	(Switzerland) St. Moritz	(Norway) Sonja Henie	(Austria) Fritzi Burger	(Austria) Hilde Holovsky	
1932	(France) Paris	(Norway) Sonja Henie	(Austria) Fritzi Burger	(Sweden) Vivi-Anne Hultén	
1933	(United Kingdom) London	(Norway) Sonja Henie	(United Kingdom) Cecilia Colledge	(Austria) Fritzi Burger	
1934	(Czechoslovakia) Prague	(Norway) Sonja Henie	(Austria) Liselotte Landbeck	(United States) Maribel Vinson	
1935	(Switzerland) St. Moritz	(Norway) Sonja Henie	(Austria) Liselotte Landbeck	(United Kingdom) Cecilia Colledge	
1936	(Germany) Berlin	(Norway) Sonja Henie	(United Kingdom) Cecilia Colledge	(United Kingdom) Megan Taylor	
1937	(Czechoslovakia) Prague	(United Kingdom) Cecilia Colledge	(United Kingdom) Megan Taylor	(Austria) Emmy Putzinger	
1938	(Switzerland) St. Moritz	(United Kingdom) Cecilia Colledge	(United Kingdom) Megan Taylor	(Austria) Emmy Putzinger	
1939	(United Kingdom) London	(United Kingdom) Cecilia Colledge	(United Kingdom) Megan Taylor	(United Kingdom) Daphne Walker	
1940–46	No competitions due to World War II				
1947	(Switzerland) Davos	(Canada) Barbara Ann Scott	(United States) Gretchen Merrill	(United Kingdom) Daphne Walker	
1948	(Czechoslovakia) Prague	(Canada) Barbara Ann Scott	(Austria) Eva Pawlik	(Czechoslovakia) Alena Vrzáňová	
1949	(Italy) Milan	(Austria) Eva Pawlik	(Czechoslovakia) Alena Vrzáňová	(United Kingdom) Jeannette Altwegg	
1950	(Norway) Oslo	(Czechoslovakia) Alena Vrzáňová	(United Kingdom) Jeannette Altwegg	(France) Jacqueline du Bief	
1951	(Switzerland) Zürich	(United Kingdom) Jeannette Altwegg	(France) Jacqueline du Bief	(United Kingdom) Barbara Wyatt	
1952	(Austria) Vienna	(United Kingdom) Jeannette Altwegg	(France) Jacqueline du Bief	(United Kingdom) Barbara Wyatt	
1953	(West Germany) Dortmund	(United Kingdom) Valda Osborn	(West Germany) Gundi Busch	(United Kingdom) Erica Batchelor	
1954	(Italy) Bolzano	(West Germany) Gundi Busch	(United Kingdom) Erica Batchelor	(United Kingdom) Yvonne Sugden	
1955	(Hungary) Budapest	(Austria) Hanna Eigel	(United Kingdom) Yvonne Sugden	(United Kingdom) Erica Batchelor	
1956	(France) Paris	(Austria) Ingrid Wendl	(United Kingdom) Yvonne Sugden	(United Kingdom) Erica Batchelor	
1957	(Austria) Vienna	(Austria) Hanna Eigel	(Austria) Ingrid Wendl	(Austria) Hanna Walter	
1958	(Czechoslovakia) Bratislava	(Austria) Ingrid Wendl	(Austria) Hanna Walter	(Netherlands) Joan Haanappel	
1959	(Switzerland) Davos	(Austria) Hanna Walter	(Netherlands) Sjoukje Dijkstra	(Netherlands) Joan Haanappel	
1960	(West Germany) Garmisch-Partenkirchen	(Netherlands) Sjoukje Dijkstra	(Austria) Regine Heitzer	(Netherlands) Joan Haanappel	
1961	(Germany) West Berlin	(Netherlands) Sjoukje Dijkstra	(Austria) Regine Heitzer	(Czechoslovakia) Jana Mrázková	
1962	(Switzerland) Geneva	(Netherlands) Sjoukje Dijkstra	(Austria) Regine Heitzer	(Austria) Karin Frohner	
1963	(Hungary) Budapest	(Netherlands) Sjoukje Dijkstra	(France) Nicole Hassler	(Austria) Regine Heitzer	
1964	(France) Grenoble	(Netherlands) Sjoukje Dijkstra	(Austria) Regine Heitzer	(France) Nicole Hassler	
1965	(Soviet Union) Moscow	(Austria) Regine Heitzer	(United Kingdom) Sally-Anne Stapleford	(France) Nicole Hassler	
1966	(Czechoslovakia) Bratislava	(Austria) Regine Heitzer	(East Germany) Gabriele Seyfert	(France) Nicole Hassler	
1967	(Socialist Federal Republic of Yugoslavia) Ljubljana	(East Germany) Gabriele Seyfert	(Czechoslovakia) Hana Mašková	(Hungary) Zsuzsa Almássy	
1968	(Sweden) Västerås	(Czechoslovakia) Hana Mašková	(East Germany) Gabriele Seyfert	(Austria) Beatrix Schuba	
1969	(West Germany) Garmisch-Partenkirchen	(East Germany) Gabriele Seyfert	(Czechoslovakia) Hana Mašková	(Austria) Beatrix Schuba	
1970	(Soviet Union) Leningrad	(East Germany) Gabriele Seyfert	(Austria) Beatrix Schuba	(Hungary) Zsuzsa Almássy	
1971	(Switzerland) Zürich	(Austria) Beatrix Schuba	(Hungary) Zsuzsa Almássy	(Italy) Rita Trapanese	
1972	(Sweden) Gothenburg	(Austria) Beatrix Schuba	(Italy) Rita Trapanese	(East Germany) Sonja Morgenstern	
1973	(West Germany) Cologne	(East Germany) Christine Errath	(United Kingdom) Jean Scott	(Switzerland) Karin Iten	
1974	(Socialist Federal Republic of Yugoslavia) Zagreb	(East Germany) Christine Errath	(Netherlands) Dianne de Leeuw	(Czechoslovakia) Liana Drahová	
1975	(Denmark) Copenhagen	(East Germany) Christine Errath	(Netherlands) Dianne de Leeuw	(East Germany) Anett Pötzsch	
1976	(Switzerland) Geneva	(Netherlands) Dianne de Leeuw	(East Germany) Anett Pötzsch	(East Germany) Christine Errath	
1977	(Finland) Helsinki	(East Germany) Anett Pötzsch	(West Germany) Dagmar Lurz	(Italy) Susanna Driano	
1978	(France) Strasbourg	(East Germany) Anett Pötzsch	(West Germany) Dagmar Lurz	(Soviet Union) Elena Vodorezova	
1979	(Socialist Federal Republic of Yugoslavia) Zagreb	(East Germany) Anett Pötzsch	(West Germany) Dagmar Lurz	(Switzerland) Denise Biellmann	
1980	(Sweden) Gothenburg	(East Germany) Anett Pötzsch	(West Germany) Dagmar Lurz	(Italy) Susanna Driano	
1981	(Austria) Innsbruck	(Switzerland) Denise Biellmann	(Socialist Federal Republic of Yugoslavia) Sanda Dubravčić	(Austria) Claudia Kristofics-Binder	
1982	(France) Lyon	(Austria) Claudia Kristofics-Binder	(East Germany) Katarina Witt	(Soviet Union) Elena Vodorezova	
1983	(West Germany) Dortmund	(East Germany) Katarina Witt	(Soviet Union) Elena Vodorezova	(West Germany) Claudia Leistner	
1984	(Hungary) Budapest	(East Germany) Katarina Witt	(West Germany) Manuela Ruben	(Soviet Union) Anna Kondrashova	
1985	(Sweden) Gothenburg	(East Germany) Katarina Witt	(Soviet Union) Kira Ivanova	(West Germany) Claudia Leistner	
1986	(Denmark) Copenhagen	(East Germany) Katarina Witt	(Soviet Union) Kira Ivanova	(Soviet Union) Anna Kondrashova	
1987	(Socialist Federal Republic of Yugoslavia) Sarajevo	(East Germany) Katarina Witt	(Soviet Union) Kira Ivanova	(Soviet Union) Anna Kondrashova	
1988	(Czechoslovakia) Prague	(East Germany) Katarina Witt	(Soviet Union) Kira Ivanova	(Soviet Union) Anna Kondrashova	
1989	(United Kingdom) Birmingham	(West Germany) Claudia Leistner	(Soviet Union) Natalia Lebedeva	(West Germany) Patricia Neske	
1990	(Soviet Union) Leningrad	(East Germany) Evelyn Großmann	(Soviet Union) Natalia Lebedeva	(West Germany) Marina Kielmann	
1991	(Bulgaria) Sofia	(France) Surya Bonaly	(Germany) Evelyn Großmann	(West Germany) Marina Kielmann	
1992	(Switzerland) Lausanne	(France) Surya Bonaly	(Germany) Marina Kielmann	(Germany) Patricia Neske	
1993	(Finland) Helsinki	(France) Surya Bonaly	(Ukraine) Oksana Baiul	(Germany) Marina Kielmann	
1994	(Denmark) Copenhagen	(France) Surya Bonaly	(Ukraine) Oksana Baiul	(Russia) Olga Markova	
1995	(Germany) Dortmund	(France) Surya Bonaly	(Russia) Olga Markova	(Ukraine) Elena Liashenko	
1996	(Bulgaria) Sofia	(Russia) Irina Slutskaya	(France) Surya Bonaly	(Russia) Maria Butyrskaya	
1997	(France) Paris	(Russia) Irina Slutskaya	(Hungary) Krisztina Czakó	(Ukraine) Yulia Lavrenchuk	
1998	(Italy) Milan	(Russia) Maria Butyrskaya	(Russia) Irina Slutskaya	(Germany) Tanja Szewczenko	
1999	(Czech Republic) Prague	(Russia) Maria Butyrskaya	(Russia) Julia Soldatova	(Russia) Viktoria Volchkova	
2000	(Austria) Vienna	(Russia) Irina Slutskaya	(Russia) Maria Butyrskaya	(Russia) Viktoria Volchkova	
2001	(Slovakia) Bratislava	(Russia) Irina Slutskaya	(Russia) Maria Butyrskaya	(Russia) Viktoria Volchkova	
2002	(Switzerland) Lausanne	(Russia) Maria Butyrskaya	(Russia) Irina Slutskaya	(Russia) Viktoria Volchkova	
2003	(Sweden) Malmö	(Russia) Irina Slutskaya	(Russia) Elena Sokolova	(Hungary) Júlia Sebestyén	
2004	(Hungary) Budapest	(Hungary) Júlia Sebestyén	(Ukraine) Elena Liashenko	(Russia) Elena Sokolova	
2005	(Italy) Turin	(Russia) Irina Slutskaya	(Finland) Susanna Pöykiö	(Ukraine) Elena Liashenko	
2006	(France) Lyon	(Russia) Irina Slutskaya	(Russia) Elena Sokolova	(Italy) Carolina Kostner	
2007	(Poland) Warsaw	(Italy) Carolina Kostner	(Switzerland) Sarah Meier	(Finland) Kiira Korpi	
2008	(Croatia) Zagreb	(Italy) Carolina Kostner	(Switzerland) Sarah Meier	(Finland) Laura Lepistö	
2009	(Finland) Helsinki	(Finland) Laura Lepistö	(Italy) Carolina Kostner	(Finland) Susanna Pöykiö	
2010	(Estonia) Tallinn	(Italy) Carolina Kostner	(Finland) Laura Lepistö	(Georgia (country)) Elene Gedevanishvili	
2011	(Switzerland) Bern	(Switzerland) Sarah Meier	(Italy) Carolina Kostner	(Finland) Kiira Korpi	
2012	(United Kingdom) Sheffield	(Italy) Carolina Kostner	(Finland) Kiira Korpi	(Georgia (country)) Elene Gedevanishvili	
2013	(Croatia) Zagreb	(Italy) Carolina Kostner	(Russia) Adelina Sotnikova	(Russia) Elizaveta Tuktamysheva	
2014	(Hungary) Budapest	(Russia) Yulia Lipnitskaya	(Russia) Adelina Sotnikova	(Italy) Carolina Kostner	
2015	(Sweden) Stockholm	(Russia) Elizaveta Tuktamysheva	(Russia) Elena Radionova	(Russia) Anna Pogorilaya	
2016	(Slovakia) Bratislava	(Russia) Evgenia Medvedeva	(Russia) Elena Radionova	(Russia) Anna Pogorilaya	
2017	(Czech Republic) Ostrava	(Russia) Evgenia Medvedeva	(Russia) Anna Pogorilaya	(Italy) Carolina Kostner	
2018	(Russia) Moscow	(Russia) Alina Zagitova	(Russia) Evgenia Medvedeva	(Italy) Carolina Kostner	
2019	(Belarus) Minsk	(Russia) Sofia Samodurova	(Russia) Alina Zagitova	(Finland) Viveca Lindfors	
2020	(Austria) Graz	(Russia) Alena Kostornaia	(Russia) Anna Shcherbakova	(Russia) Alexandra Trusova	
2021	(Croatia) Zagreb	Competition cancelled due to the COVID-19 pandemic			
2022	(Estonia) Tallinn	(Russia) Anna Shcherbakova	(Russia) Alexandra Trusova	(Belgium) Loena Hendrickx	
2023	(Finland) Espoo	(Georgia (country)) Anastasiia Gubanova	(Belgium) Loena Hendrickx	(Switzerland) Kimmy Repond	
2024	(Lithuania) Kaunas	(Belgium) Loena Hendrickx	(Georgia (country)) Anastasiia Gubanova	(Belgium) Nina Pinzarrone	
2025	(Estonia) Tallinn	(Estonia) Niina Petrõkina	(Georgia (country)) Anastasiia Gubanova	(Belgium) Nina Pinzarrone	
2026	(United Kingdom) Sheffield	(Estonia) Niina Petrõkina	(Belgium) Loena Hendrickx	(Italy) Lara Naki Gutmann	

=== Pairs ===
Pairs' event medalists
Year	Location	Gold	Silver	Bronze	Ref.
1930	(Austria) Vienna	(Hungary); Olga Orgonista; Sándor Szalay	(Hungary); Emília Rotter; László Szollás	(Austria); Gisela Hochhaltinger; Otto Preißecker	
1931	(Switzerland) St. Moritz	(Hungary); Olga Orgonista; Sándor Szalay	(Hungary); Emília Rotter; László Szollás	(Austria); Lilly Gaillard; Willy Petter	
1932	(France) Paris	(France); Andrée Brunet; Pierre Brunet	(Austria); Lilly Gaillard; Willy Petter	(Austria); Idi Papez; Karl Zwack	
1933	(United Kingdom) London	(Austria); Idi Papez; Karl Zwack	(Austria); Lilly Gaillard; Willy Petter	(United Kingdom); Mollie Phillips; Rodney Murdoch	
1934	(Czechoslovakia) Prague	(Hungary); Emília Rotter; László Szollás	(Austria); Idi Papez; Karl Zwack	(Poland); Zofia Bilorówna; Tadeusz Kowalski	
1935	(Switzerland) St. Moritz	(Germany); Maxi Herber; Ernst Baier	(Austria); Idi Papez; Karl Zwack	(Hungary); Lucy Galló; Rezső Dillinger	
1936	(Germany) Berlin	(Germany); Maxi Herber; Ernst Baier	(United Kingdom); Violet Cliff; Leslie Cliff	(Hungary); Piroska Szekrényessy; Attila Szekrényessy	
1937	(Czechoslovakia) Prague	(Germany); Maxi Herber; Ernst Baier	(Austria); Ilse Pausin; Erik Pausin	(Hungary); Piroska Szekrényessy; Attila Szekrényessy	
1938	(Czechoslovakia) Troppau	(Germany); Maxi Herber; Ernst Baier	(Austria); Ilse Pausin; Erik Pausin	(Germany); Inge Koch; Günther Noack	
1939	(Poland) Zakopane	(Germany); Maxi Herber; Ernst Baier	(Germany); Ilse Pausin; Erik Pausin	(Germany); Inge Koch; Günther Noack	
1940–46	No competitions due to World War II				
1947	(Switzerland) Davos	(Belgium); Micheline Lannoy; Pierre Baugniet	(United Kingdom); Winifred Silverthorne; Dennis Silverthorne	(Belgium); Suzanne Diskeuve; Edmond Verbustel	
1948	(Czechoslovakia) Prague	(Hungary); Andrea Kékesy; Ede Király	(Czechoslovakia); Blažena Knittlová; Karel Vosátka	(Austria); Herta Ratzenhofer; Emil Ratzenhofer	
1949	(Italy) Milan	(Hungary); Andrea Kékesy; Ede Király	(Hungary); Marianne Nagy; László Nagy	(Austria); Herta Ratzenhofer; Emil Ratzenhofer	
1950	(Norway) Oslo	(Hungary); Marianne Nagy; László Nagy	(Switzerland); Eliane Steinemann; André Calame	(United Kingdom); Jennifer Nicks; John Nicks	
1951	(Switzerland) Zürich	(West Germany); Ria Baran; Paul Falk	(Switzerland); Eliane Steinemann; André Calame	(United Kingdom); Jennifer Nicks; John Nicks	
1952	(Austria) Vienna	(West Germany); Ria Baran; Paul Falk	(United Kingdom); Jennifer Nicks; John Nicks	(Hungary); Marianne Nagy; László Nagy	
1953	(West Germany) Dortmund	(United Kingdom); Jennifer Nicks; John Nicks	(Hungary); Marianne Nagy; László Nagy	(Austria); Sissy Schwarz; Kurt Oppelt	
1954	(Italy) Bolzano	(Switzerland); Silvia Grandjean; Michel Grandjean	(Austria); Sissy Schwarz; Kurt Oppelt	(Czechoslovakia); Soňa Balůnová; Miroslav Balůn	
1955	(Hungary) Budapest	(Hungary); Marianne Nagy; László Nagy	(Czechoslovakia); Věra Suchánková; Zdeněk Doležal	(West Germany); Marika Kilius; Franz Ningel	
1956	(France) Paris	(Austria); Sissy Schwarz; Kurt Oppelt	(Hungary); Marianne Nagy; László Nagy	(West Germany); Marika Kilius; Franz Ningel	
1957	(Austria) Vienna	(Czechoslovakia); Věra Suchánková; Zdeněk Doležal	(Hungary); Marianne Nagy; László Nagy	(West Germany); Marika Kilius; Franz Ningel	
1958	(Czechoslovakia) Bratislava	(Czechoslovakia); Věra Suchánková; Zdeněk Doležal	(Soviet Union); Nina Zhuk; Stanislav Zhuk	(United Kingdom); Joyce Coates; Anthony Holles	
1959	(Switzerland) Davos	(West Germany); Marika Kilius; Hans-Jürgen Bäumler	(Soviet Union); Nina Zhuk; Stanislav Zhuk	(United Kingdom); Joyce Coates; Anthony Holles	
1960	(West Germany) Garmisch-Partenkirchen	(West Germany); Marika Kilius; Hans-Jürgen Bäumler	(Soviet Union); Nina Zhuk; Stanislav Zhuk	(West Germany); Margret Göbl; Franz Ningel	
1961	(Germany) West Berlin	(West Germany); Marika Kilius; Hans-Jürgen Bäumler	(West Germany); Margret Göbl; Franz Ningel	(East Germany); Margit Senf; Peter Göbel	
1962	(Switzerland) Geneva	(West Germany); Marika Kilius; Hans-Jürgen Bäumler	(Soviet Union); Ludmila Belousova; Oleg Protopopov	(West Germany); Margret Göbl; Franz Ningel	
1963	(Hungary) Budapest	(West Germany); Marika Kilius; Hans-Jürgen Bäumler	(Soviet Union); Ludmila Belousova; Oleg Protopopov	(Soviet Union); Tatiana Zhuk; Alexander Gavrilov	
1964	(France) Grenoble	(West Germany); Marika Kilius; Hans-Jürgen Bäumler	(Soviet Union); Ludmila Belousova; Oleg Protopopov	(Soviet Union); Tatiana Zhuk; Alexander Gavrilov	
1965	(Soviet Union) Moscow	(Soviet Union); Ludmila Belousova; Oleg Protopopov	(Switzerland); Gerda Johner; Rüdi Johner	(Soviet Union); Tatiana Zhuk; Alexander Gavrilov	
1966	(Czechoslovakia) Bratislava	(Soviet Union); Ludmila Belousova; Oleg Protopopov	(Soviet Union); Tatiana Zhuk; Alexander Gorelik	(West Germany); Margot Glockshuber; Wolfgang Danne	
1967	(Socialist Federal Republic of Yugoslavia) Ljubljana	(Soviet Union); Ludmila Belousova; Oleg Protopopov	(West Germany); Margot Glockshuber; Wolfgang Danne	(East Germany); Heidemarie Steiner; Heinz-Ulrich Walther	
1968	(Sweden) Västerås	(Soviet Union); Ludmila Belousova; Oleg Protopopov	(Soviet Union); Tamara Moskvina; Alexei Mishin	(East Germany); Heidemarie Steiner; Heinz-Ulrich Walther	
1969	(West Germany) Garmisch-Partenkirchen	(Soviet Union); Irina Rodnina; Alexei Ulanov	(Soviet Union); Ludmila Belousova; Oleg Protopopov	(Soviet Union); Tamara Moskvina; Alexei Mishin	
1970	(Soviet Union) Leningrad	(Soviet Union); Irina Rodnina; Alexei Ulanov	(Soviet Union); Lyudmila Smirnova; Andrei Suraikin	(East Germany); Heidemarie Steiner; Heinz-Ulrich Walther	
1971	(Switzerland) Zürich	(Soviet Union); Irina Rodnina; Alexei Ulanov	(Soviet Union); Lyudmila Smirnova; Andrei Suraikin	(Soviet Union); Galina Karelina; Georgi Proskurin	
1972	(Sweden) Gothenburg	(Soviet Union); Irina Rodnina; Alexei Ulanov	(Soviet Union); Lyudmila Smirnova; Andrei Suraikin	(East Germany); Manuela Groß; Uwe Kagelmann	
1973	(West Germany) Cologne	(Soviet Union); Irina Rodnina; Alexander Zaitsev	(Soviet Union); Lyudmila Smirnova; Alexei Ulanov	(West Germany); Almut Lehmann; Herbert Wiesinger	
1974	(Socialist Federal Republic of Yugoslavia) Zagreb	(Soviet Union); Irina Rodnina; Alexander Zaitsev	(East Germany); Romy Kermer; Rolf Oesterreich	(Soviet Union); Lyudmila Smirnova; Alexei Ulanov	
1975	(Denmark) Copenhagen	(Soviet Union); Irina Rodnina; Alexander Zaitsev	(East Germany); Romy Kermer; Rolf Oesterreich	(East Germany); Manuela Groß; Uwe Kagelmann	
1976	(Switzerland) Geneva	(Soviet Union); Irina Rodnina; Alexander Zaitsev	(East Germany); Romy Kermer; Rolf Oesterreich	(Soviet Union); Irina Vorobieva; Alexander Vlasov	
1977	(Finland) Helsinki	(Soviet Union); Irina Rodnina; Alexander Zaitsev	(Soviet Union); Irina Vorobieva; Alexander Vlasov	(Soviet Union); Marina Cherkasova; Sergei Shakhrai	
1978	(France) Strasbourg	(Soviet Union); Irina Rodnina; Alexander Zaitsev	(Soviet Union); Marina Cherkasova; Sergei Shakhrai	(East Germany); Manuela Mager; Uwe Bewersdorf	
1979	(Socialist Federal Republic of Yugoslavia) Zagreb	(Soviet Union); Marina Cherkasova; Sergei Shakhrai	(Soviet Union); Irina Vorobieva; Igor Lisovski	(East Germany); Sabine Baeß; Tassilo Thierbach	
1980	(Sweden) Gothenburg	(Soviet Union); Irina Rodnina; Alexander Zaitsev	(Soviet Union); Marina Cherkasova; Sergei Shakhrai	(Soviet Union); Marina Pestova; Stanislav Leonovich	
1981	(Austria) Innsbruck	(Soviet Union); Irina Vorobieva; Igor Lisovski	(West Germany); Christina Riegel; Andreas Nischwitz	(Soviet Union); Marina Cherkasova; Sergei Shakhrai	
1982	(France) Lyon	(East Germany); Sabine Baeß; Tassilo Thierbach	(Soviet Union); Marina Pestova; Stanislav Leonovich	(Soviet Union); Irina Vorobieva; Igor Lisovski	
1983	(West Germany) Dortmund	(East Germany); Sabine Baeß; Tassilo Thierbach	(Soviet Union); Elena Valova; Oleg Vasiliev	(East Germany); Birgit Lorenz; Knut Schubert	
1984	(Hungary) Budapest	(Soviet Union); Elena Valova; Oleg Vasiliev	(East Germany); Sabine Baeß; Tassilo Thierbach	(East Germany); Birgit Lorenz; Knut Schubert	
1985	(Sweden) Gothenburg	(Soviet Union); Elena Valova; Oleg Vasiliev	(Soviet Union); Larisa Selezneva; Oleg Makarov	(Soviet Union); Veronika Pershina; Marat Akbarov	
1986	(Denmark) Copenhagen	(Soviet Union); Elena Valova; Oleg Vasiliev	(Soviet Union); Ekaterina Gordeeva; Sergei Grinkov	(Soviet Union); Elena Bechke; Valeri Kornienko	
1987	(Socialist Federal Republic of Yugoslavia) Sarajevo	(Soviet Union); Larisa Selezneva; Oleg Makarov	(Soviet Union); Elena Valova; Oleg Vasiliev	(East Germany); Katrin Kanitz; Tobias Schröter	
1988	(Czechoslovakia) Prague	(Soviet Union); Ekaterina Gordeeva; Sergei Grinkov	(Soviet Union); Larisa Selezneva; Oleg Makarov	(East Germany); Peggy Schwarz; Alexander König	
1989	(United Kingdom) Birmingham	(Soviet Union); Larisa Selezneva; Oleg Makarov	(East Germany); Mandy Wötzel; Axel Rauschenbach	(Soviet Union); Natalia Mishkutionok; Artur Dmitriev	
1990	(Soviet Union) Leningrad	(Soviet Union); Ekaterina Gordeeva; Sergei Grinkov	(Soviet Union); Larisa Selezneva; Oleg Makarov	(Soviet Union); Natalia Mishkutionok; Artur Dmitriev	
1991	(Bulgaria) Sofia	(Soviet Union); Natalia Mishkutionok; Artur Dmitriev	(Soviet Union); Elena Bechke; Denis Petrov	(Soviet Union); Evgenia Shishkova; Vadim Naumov	
1992	(Switzerland) Lausanne	(Commonwealth of Independent States); Natalia Mishkutionok; Artur Dmitriev	(Commonwealth of Independent States); Elena Bechke; Denis Petrov	(Commonwealth of Independent States); Evgenia Shishkova; Vadim Naumov	
1993	(Finland) Helsinki	(Russia); Marina Eltsova; Andrei Bushkov	(Germany); Mandy Wötzel; Ingo Steuer	(Russia); Evgenia Shishkova; Vadim Naumov	
1994	(Denmark) Copenhagen	(Russia); Ekaterina Gordeeva; Sergei Grinkov	(Russia); Evgenia Shishkova; Vadim Naumov	(Russia); Natalia Mishkutionok; Artur Dmitriev	
1995	(Germany) Dortmund	(Germany); Mandy Wötzel; Ingo Steuer	(Czech Republic); Radka Kovaříková; René Novotný	(Russia); Evgenia Shishkova; Vadim Naumov	
1996	(Bulgaria) Sofia	(Russia); Oksana Kazakova; Artur Dmitriev	(Germany); Mandy Wötzel; Ingo Steuer	(France); Sarah Abitbol; Stéphane Bernadis	
1997	(France) Paris	(Russia); Marina Eltsova; Andrei Bushkov	(Germany); Mandy Wötzel; Ingo Steuer	(Russia); Elena Berezhnaya; Anton Sikharulidze	
1998	(Italy) Milan	(Russia); Elena Berezhnaya; Anton Sikharulidze	(Russia); Oksana Kazakova; Artur Dmitriev	(France); Sarah Abitbol; Stéphane Bernadis	
1999	(Czech Republic) Prague	(Russia); Maria Petrova; Alexei Tikhonov	(Poland); Dorota Zagórska; Mariusz Siudek	(France); Sarah Abitbol; Stéphane Bernadis	
2000	(Austria) Vienna	(Russia); Maria Petrova; Alexei Tikhonov	(Poland); Dorota Zagórska; Mariusz Siudek	(France); Sarah Abitbol; Stéphane Bernadis	
2001	(Slovakia) Bratislava	(Russia); Elena Berezhnaya; Anton Sikharulidze	(Russia); Tatiana Totmianina; Maxim Marinin	(France); Sarah Abitbol; Stéphane Bernadis	
2002	(Switzerland) Lausanne	(Russia); Tatiana Totmianina; Maxim Marinin	(France); Sarah Abitbol; Stéphane Bernadis	(Russia); Maria Petrova; Alexei Tikhonov	
2003	(Sweden) Malmö	(Russia); Tatiana Totmianina; Maxim Marinin	(France); Sarah Abitbol; Stéphane Bernadis	(Russia); Maria Petrova; Alexei Tikhonov	
2004	(Hungary) Budapest	(Russia); Tatiana Totmianina; Maxim Marinin	(Russia); Maria Petrova; Alexei Tikhonov	(Poland); Dorota Zagórska; Mariusz Siudek	
2005	(Italy) Turin	(Russia); Tatiana Totmianina; Maxim Marinin	(Russia); Julia Obertas; Sergei Slavnov	(Russia); Maria Petrova; Alexei Tikhonov	
2006	(France) Lyon	(Russia); Tatiana Totmianina; Maxim Marinin	(Germany); Aljona Savchenko; Robin Szolkowy	(Russia); Maria Petrova; Alexei Tikhonov	
2007	(Poland) Warsaw	(Germany); Aljona Savchenko; Robin Szolkowy	(Russia); Maria Petrova; Alexei Tikhonov	(Poland); Dorota Siudek; Mariusz Siudek	
2008	(Croatia) Zagreb	(Germany); Aljona Savchenko; Robin Szolkowy	(Russia); Maria Mukhortova; Maxim Trankov	(Russia); Yuko Kavaguti; Alexander Smirnov	
2009	(Finland) Helsinki	(Germany); Aljona Savchenko; Robin Szolkowy	(Russia); Yuko Kavaguti; Alexander Smirnov	(Russia); Maria Mukhortova; Maxim Trankov	
2010	(Estonia) Tallinn	(Russia); Yuko Kavaguti; Alexander Smirnov	(Germany); Aljona Savchenko; Robin Szolkowy	(Russia); Maria Mukhortova; Maxim Trankov	
2011	(Switzerland) Bern	(Germany); Aljona Savchenko; Robin Szolkowy	(Russia); Yuko Kavaguti; Alexander Smirnov	(Russia); Vera Bazarova; Yuri Larionov	
2012	(United Kingdom) Sheffield	(Russia); Tatiana Volosozhar; Maxim Trankov	(Russia); Vera Bazarova; Yuri Larionov	(Russia); Ksenia Stolbova; Fedor Klimov	
2013	(Croatia) Zagreb	(Russia); Tatiana Volosozhar; Maxim Trankov	(Germany); Aljona Savchenko; Robin Szolkowy	(Italy); Stefania Berton; Ondřej Hotárek	
2014	(Hungary) Budapest	(Russia); Tatiana Volosozhar; Maxim Trankov	(Russia); Ksenia Stolbova; Fedor Klimov	(Russia); Vera Bazarova; Yuri Larionov	
2015	(Sweden) Stockholm	(Russia); Yuko Kavaguti; Alexander Smirnov	(Russia); Ksenia Stolbova; Fedor Klimov	(Russia); Evgenia Tarasova; Vladimir Morozov	
2016	(Slovakia) Bratislava	(Russia); Tatiana Volosozhar; Maxim Trankov	(Germany); Aljona Savchenko; Bruno Massot	(Russia); Evgenia Tarasova; Vladimir Morozov	
2017	(Czech Republic) Ostrava	(Russia); Evgenia Tarasova; Vladimir Morozov	(Germany); Aljona Savchenko; Bruno Massot	(France); Vanessa James; Morgan Ciprès	
2018	(Russia) Moscow	(Russia); Evgenia Tarasova; Vladimir Morozov	(Russia); Ksenia Stolbova; Fedor Klimov	(Russia); Natalia Zabiiako; Alexander Enbert	
2019	(Belarus) Minsk	(France); Vanessa James; Morgan Ciprès	(Russia); Evgenia Tarasova; Vladimir Morozov	(Russia); Aleksandra Boikova; Dmitrii Kozlovskii	
2020	(Austria) Graz	(Russia); Aleksandra Boikova; Dmitrii Kozlovskii	(Russia); Evgenia Tarasova; Vladimir Morozov	(Russia); Daria Pavliuchenko; Denis Khodykin	
2021	(Croatia) Zagreb	Competition cancelled due to the COVID-19 pandemic			
2022	(Estonia) Tallinn	(Russia); Anastasia Mishina; Aleksandr Galliamov	(Russia); Evgenia Tarasova; Vladimir Morozov	(Russia); Aleksandra Boikova; Dmitrii Kozlovskii	
2023	(Finland) Espoo	(Italy); Sara Conti; Niccolò Macii	(Italy); Rebecca Ghilardi; Filippo Ambrosini	(Germany); Annika Hocke; Robert Kunkel	
2024	(Lithuania) Kaunas	(Italy); Lucrezia Beccari; Matteo Guarise	(Georgia (country)); Anastasiia Metelkina; Luka Berulava	(Italy); Rebecca Ghilardi; Filippo Ambrosini	
2025	(Estonia) Tallinn	(Germany); Minerva Fabienne Hase; Nikita Volodin	(Italy); Sara Conti; Niccolò Macii	(Georgia (country)); Anastasiia Metelkina; Luka Berulava	
2026	(United Kingdom) Sheffield	(Georgia (country)); Anastasiia Metelkina; Luka Berulava	(Germany); Minerva Fabienne Hase; Nikita Volodin	(Hungary); Maria Pavlova; Alexei Sviatchenko	

=== Ice dance ===
Ice dance event medalists
Year	Location	Gold	Silver	Bronze	Ref.
1954	(Italy) Bolzano	(United Kingdom); Jean Westwood; Lawrence Demmy	(United Kingdom); Nesta Davies; Paul Thomas	(United Kingdom); Barbara Radford; Raymond Lockwood	
1955	(Hungary) Budapest	(United Kingdom); Jean Westwood; Lawrence Demmy	(United Kingdom); Pamela Weight; Paul Thomas	(United Kingdom); Barbara Radford; Raymond Lockwood	
1956	(France) Paris	(United Kingdom); Pamela Weight; Paul Thomas	(United Kingdom); June Markham; Courtney Jones	(United Kingdom); Barbara Thompson; Gerard Rigby	
1957	(Austria) Vienna	(United Kingdom); June Markham; Courtney Jones	(United Kingdom); Barbara Thompson; Gerard Rigby	(United Kingdom); Catherine Morris; Michael Robinson	
1958	(Czechoslovakia) Bratislava	(United Kingdom); June Markham; Courtney Jones	(United Kingdom); Catherine Morris; Michael Robinson	(United Kingdom); Barbara Thompson; Gerard Rigby	
1959	(Switzerland) Davos	(United Kingdom); Doreen Denny; Courtney Jones	(United Kingdom); Catherine Morris; Michael Robinson	(France); Christiane Guhel; Jean Paul Guhel	
1960	(West Germany) Garmisch-Partenkirchen	(United Kingdom); Doreen Denny; Courtney Jones	(France); Christiane Guhel; Jean Paul Guhel	(United Kingdom); Mary Parry; Roy Mason	
1961	(Germany) West Berlin	(United Kingdom); Doreen Denny; Courtney Jones	(France); Christiane Guhel; Jean Paul Guhel	(United Kingdom); Linda Shearman; Michael Phillips	
1962	(Switzerland) Geneva	(France); Christiane Guhel; Jean Paul Guhel	(United Kingdom); Linda Shearman; Michael Phillips	(Czechoslovakia); Eva Romanová; Pavel Roman	
1963	(Hungary) Budapest	(United Kingdom); Linda Shearman; Michael Phillips	(Czechoslovakia); Eva Romanová; Pavel Roman	(United Kingdom); Janet Sawbridge; David Hickinbottom	
1964	(France) Grenoble	(Czechoslovakia); Eva Romanová; Pavel Roman	(United Kingdom); Janet Sawbridge; David Hickinbottom	(United Kingdom); Yvonne Suddick; Roger Kennerson	
1965	(Soviet Union) Moscow	(Czechoslovakia); Eva Romanová; Pavel Roman	(United Kingdom); Janet Sawbridge; David Hickinbottom	(United Kingdom); Yvonne Suddick; Roger Kennerson	
1966	(Czechoslovakia) Bratislava	(United Kingdom); Diane Towler; Bernard Ford	(United Kingdom); Yvonne Suddick; Roger Kennerson	(Czechoslovakia); Jitka Babická; Jaromír Holan	
1967	(Socialist Federal Republic of Yugoslavia) Ljubljana	(United Kingdom); Diane Towler; Bernard Ford	(United Kingdom); Yvonne Suddick; Roger Kennerson	(France); Brigitte Martin; Francis Gamichon	
1968	(Sweden) Västerås	(United Kingdom); Diane Towler; Bernard Ford	(United Kingdom); Yvonne Suddick; Roger Kennerson	(United Kingdom); Janet Sawbridge; Jon Lane	
1969	(West Germany) Garmisch-Partenkirchen	(United Kingdom); Diane Towler; Bernard Ford	(United Kingdom); Janet Sawbridge; Jon Lane	(Soviet Union); Lyudmila Pakhomova; Aleksandr Gorshkov	
1970	(Soviet Union) Leningrad	(Soviet Union); Lyudmila Pakhomova; Aleksandr Gorshkov	(West Germany); Angelika Buck; Erich Buck	(Soviet Union); Tatiana Voitiuk; Viacheslav Zhigalin	
1971	(Switzerland) Zürich	(Soviet Union); Lyudmila Pakhomova; Aleksandr Gorshkov	(West Germany); Angelika Buck; Erich Buck	(United Kingdom); Susan Getty; Roy Bradshaw	
1972	(Sweden) Gothenburg	(West Germany); Angelika Buck; Erich Buck	(Soviet Union); Lyudmila Pakhomova; Aleksandr Gorshkov	(United Kingdom); Janet Sawbridge; Peter Dalby	
1973	(West Germany) Cologne	(Soviet Union); Lyudmila Pakhomova; Aleksandr Gorshkov	(West Germany); Angelika Buck; Erich Buck	(United Kingdom); Hilary Green; Glyn Watts	
1974	(Socialist Federal Republic of Yugoslavia) Zagreb	(Soviet Union); Lyudmila Pakhomova; Aleksandr Gorshkov	(United Kingdom); Hilary Green; Glyn Watts	(Soviet Union); Natalia Linichuk; Gennadi Karponosov	
1975	(Denmark) Copenhagen	(Soviet Union); Lyudmila Pakhomova; Aleksandr Gorshkov	(United Kingdom); Hilary Green; Glyn Watts	(Soviet Union); Natalia Linichuk; Gennadi Karponosov	
1976	(Switzerland) Geneva	(Soviet Union); Lyudmila Pakhomova; Aleksandr Gorshkov	(Soviet Union); Irina Moiseeva; Andrei Minenkov	(Soviet Union); Natalia Linichuk; Gennadi Karponosov	
1977	(Finland) Helsinki	(Soviet Union); Irina Moiseeva; Andrei Minenkov	(Hungary); Krisztina Regőczy; András Sallay	(Soviet Union); Natalia Linichuk; Gennadi Karponosov	
1978	(France) Strasbourg	(Soviet Union); Irina Moiseeva; Andrei Minenkov	(Soviet Union); Natalia Linichuk; Gennadi Karponosov	(Hungary); Krisztina Regőczy; András Sallay	
1979	(Socialist Federal Republic of Yugoslavia) Zagreb	(Soviet Union); Natalia Linichuk; Gennadi Karponosov	(Soviet Union); Irina Moiseeva; Andrei Minenkov	(Hungary); Krisztina Regőczy; András Sallay	
1980	(Sweden) Gothenburg	(Soviet Union); Natalia Linichuk; Gennadi Karponosov	(Hungary); Krisztina Regőczy; András Sallay	(Soviet Union); Irina Moiseeva; Andrei Minenkov	
1981	(Austria) Innsbruck	(United Kingdom); Jayne Torvill; Christopher Dean	(Soviet Union); Irina Moiseeva; Andrei Minenkov	(Soviet Union); Natalia Linichuk; Gennadi Karponosov	
1982	(France) Lyon	(United Kingdom); Jayne Torvill; Christopher Dean	(Soviet Union); Natalia Bestemianova; Andrei Bukin	(Soviet Union); Irina Moiseeva; Andrei Minenkov	
1983	(West Germany) Dortmund	(Soviet Union); Natalia Bestemianova; Andrei Bukin	(Soviet Union); Olga Volozhinskaya; Alexander Svinin	(United Kingdom); Karen Barber; Nicholas Slater	
1984	(Hungary) Budapest	(United Kingdom); Jayne Torvill; Christopher Dean	(Soviet Union); Natalia Bestemianova; Andrei Bukin	(Soviet Union); Marina Klimova; Sergei Ponomarenko	
1985	(Sweden) Gothenburg	(Soviet Union); Natalia Bestemianova; Andrei Bukin	(Soviet Union); Marina Klimova; Sergei Ponomarenko	(West Germany); Petra Born; Rainer Schönborn	
1986	(Denmark) Copenhagen	(Soviet Union); Natalia Bestemianova; Andrei Bukin	(Soviet Union); Marina Klimova; Sergei Ponomarenko	(Soviet Union); Natalia Annenko; Genrikh Sretenski	
1987	(Socialist Federal Republic of Yugoslavia) Sarajevo	(Soviet Union); Natalia Bestemianova; Andrei Bukin	(Soviet Union); Marina Klimova; Sergei Ponomarenko	(Soviet Union); Natalia Annenko; Genrikh Sretenski	
1988	(Czechoslovakia) Prague	(Soviet Union); Natalia Bestemianova; Andrei Bukin	(Soviet Union); Natalia Annenko; Genrikh Sretenski	(France); Isabelle Duchesnay; Paul Duchesnay	
1989	(United Kingdom) Birmingham	(Soviet Union); Marina Klimova; Sergei Ponomarenko	(Soviet Union); Maya Usova; Alexander Zhulin	(Soviet Union); Natalia Annenko; Genrikh Sretenski	
1990	(Soviet Union) Leningrad	(Soviet Union); Marina Klimova; Sergei Ponomarenko	(Soviet Union); Maya Usova; Alexander Zhulin	(France); Isabelle Duchesnay; Paul Duchesnay	
1991	(Bulgaria) Sofia	(Soviet Union); Marina Klimova; Sergei Ponomarenko	(France); Isabelle Duchesnay; Paul Duchesnay	(Soviet Union); Maya Usova; Alexander Zhulin	
1992	(Switzerland) Lausanne	(Commonwealth of Independent States); Marina Klimova; Sergei Ponomarenko	(Commonwealth of Independent States); Maya Usova; Alexander Zhulin	(Commonwealth of Independent States); Oksana Grishuk; Evgeni Platov	
1993	(Finland) Helsinki	(Russia); Maya Usova; Alexander Zhulin	(Russia); Oksana Grishuk; Evgeni Platov	(Finland); Susanna Rahkamo; Petri Kokko	
1994	(Denmark) Copenhagen	(United Kingdom); Jayne Torvill; Christopher Dean	(Russia); Oksana Grishuk; Evgeni Platov	(Russia); Maya Usova; Alexander Zhulin	
1995	(Germany) Dortmund	(Finland); Susanna Rahkamo; Petri Kokko	(France); Sophie Moniotte; Pascal Lavanchy	(Russia); Anjelika Krylova; Oleg Ovsyannikov	
1996	(Bulgaria) Sofia	(Russia); Oksana Grishuk; Evgeni Platov	(Russia); Anjelika Krylova; Oleg Ovsyannikov	(Ukraine); Irina Romanova; Igor Yaroshenko	
1997	(France) Paris	(Russia); Oksana Grishuk; Evgeni Platov	(Russia); Anjelika Krylova; Oleg Ovsyannikov	(France); Sophie Moniotte; Pascal Lavanchy	
1998	(Italy) Milan	(Russia); Oksana Grishuk; Evgeni Platov	(Russia); Anjelika Krylova; Oleg Ovsyannikov	(France); Marina Anissina; Gwendal Peizerat	
1999	(Czech Republic) Prague	(Russia); Anjelika Krylova; Oleg Ovsyannikov	(France); Marina Anissina; Gwendal Peizerat	(Russia); Irina Lobacheva; Ilia Averbukh	
2000	(Austria) Vienna	(France); Marina Anissina; Gwendal Peizerat	(Italy); Barbara Fusar-Poli; Maurizio Margaglio	(Lithuania); Margarita Drobiazko; Povilas Vanagas	
2001	(Slovakia) Bratislava	(Italy); Barbara Fusar-Poli; Maurizio Margaglio	(France); Marina Anissina; Gwendal Peizerat	(Russia); Irina Lobacheva; Ilia Averbukh	
2002	(Switzerland) Lausanne	(France); Marina Anissina; Gwendal Peizerat	(Italy); Barbara Fusar-Poli; Maurizio Margaglio	(Russia); Irina Lobacheva; Ilia Averbukh	
2003	(Sweden) Malmö	(Russia); Irina Lobacheva; Ilia Averbukh	(Bulgaria); Albena Denkova; Maxim Staviski	(Russia); Tatiana Navka; Roman Kostomarov	
2004	(Hungary) Budapest	(Russia); Tatiana Navka; Roman Kostomarov	(Bulgaria); Albena Denkova; Maxim Staviski	(Ukraine); Elena Grushina; Ruslan Goncharov	
2005	(Italy) Turin	(Russia); Tatiana Navka; Roman Kostomarov	(Ukraine); Elena Grushina; Ruslan Goncharov	(France); Isabelle Delobel; Olivier Schoenfelder	
2006	(France) Lyon	(Russia); Tatiana Navka; Roman Kostomarov	(Ukraine); Elena Grushina; Ruslan Goncharov	(Lithuania); Margarita Drobiazko; Povilas Vanagas	
2007	(Poland) Warsaw	(France); Isabelle Delobel; Olivier Schoenfelder	(Russia); Oksana Domnina; Maxim Shabalin	(Bulgaria); Albena Denkova; Maxim Staviski	
2008	(Croatia) Zagreb	(Russia); Oksana Domnina; Maxim Shabalin	(France); Isabelle Delobel; Olivier Schoenfelder	(Russia); Jana Khokhlova; Sergei Novitski	
2009	(Finland) Helsinki	(Russia); Jana Khokhlova; Sergei Novitski	(Italy); Federica Faiella; Massimo Scali	(United Kingdom); Sinead Kerr; John Kerr	
2010	(Estonia) Tallinn	(Russia); Oksana Domnina; Maxim Shabalin	(Italy); Federica Faiella; Massimo Scali	(Russia); Jana Khokhlova; Sergei Novitski	
2011	(Switzerland) Bern	(France); Nathalie Péchalat; Fabian Bourzat	(Russia); Ekaterina Bobrova; Dmitri Soloviev	(United Kingdom); Sinead Kerr; John Kerr	
2012	(United Kingdom) Sheffield	(France); Nathalie Péchalat; Fabian Bourzat	(Russia); Ekaterina Bobrova; Dmitri Soloviev	(Russia); Elena Ilinykh; Nikita Katsalapov	
2013	(Croatia) Zagreb	(Russia); Ekaterina Bobrova; Dmitri Soloviev	(Russia); Elena Ilinykh; Nikita Katsalapov	(Italy); Anna Cappellini; Luca Lanotte	
2014	(Hungary) Budapest	(Italy); Anna Cappellini; Luca Lanotte	(Russia); Elena Ilinykh; Nikita Katsalapov	(United Kingdom); Penny Coomes; Nicholas Buckland	
2015	(Sweden) Stockholm	(France); Gabriella Papadakis; Guillaume Cizeron	(Italy); Anna Cappellini; Luca Lanotte	(Russia); Alexandra Stepanova; Ivan Bukin	
2016	(Slovakia) Bratislava	(France); Gabriella Papadakis; Guillaume Cizeron	(Italy); Anna Cappellini; Luca Lanotte	(Russia); Ekaterina Bobrova; Dmitri Soloviev	
2017	(Czech Republic) Ostrava	(France); Gabriella Papadakis; Guillaume Cizeron	(Italy); Anna Cappellini; Luca Lanotte	(Russia); Ekaterina Bobrova; Dmitri Soloviev	
2018	(Russia) Moscow	(France); Gabriella Papadakis; Guillaume Cizeron	(Russia); Ekaterina Bobrova; Dmitri Soloviev	(Russia); Alexandra Stepanova; Ivan Bukin	
2019	(Belarus) Minsk	(France); Gabriella Papadakis; Guillaume Cizeron	(Russia); Alexandra Stepanova; Ivan Bukin	(Italy); Charlène Guignard; Marco Fabbri	
2020	(Austria) Graz	(Russia); Victoria Sinitsina; Nikita Katsalapov	(France); Gabriella Papadakis; Guillaume Cizeron	(Russia); Alexandra Stepanova; Ivan Bukin	
2021	(Croatia) Zagreb	Competition cancelled due to the COVID-19 pandemic			
2022	(Estonia) Tallinn	(Russia); Victoria Sinitsina; Nikita Katsalapov	(Russia); Alexandra Stepanova; Ivan Bukin	(Italy); Charlène Guignard; Marco Fabbri	
2023	(Finland) Espoo	(Italy); Charlène Guignard; Marco Fabbri	(United Kingdom); Lilah Fear; Lewis Gibson	(Finland); Juulia Turkkila; Matthias Versluis	
2024	(Lithuania) Kaunas	(Italy); Charlène Guignard; Marco Fabbri	(United Kingdom); Lilah Fear; Lewis Gibson	(Lithuania); Allison Reed; Saulius Ambrulevičius	
2025	(Estonia) Tallinn	(Italy); Charlène Guignard; Marco Fabbri	(France); Evgeniia Lopareva; Geoffrey Brissaud	(United Kingdom); Lilah Fear; Lewis Gibson	
2026	(United Kingdom) Sheffield	(France); Laurence Fournier Beaudry; Guillaume Cizeron	(Italy); Charlène Guignard; Marco Fabbri	(United Kingdom); Lilah Fear; Lewis Gibson	

== Records ==
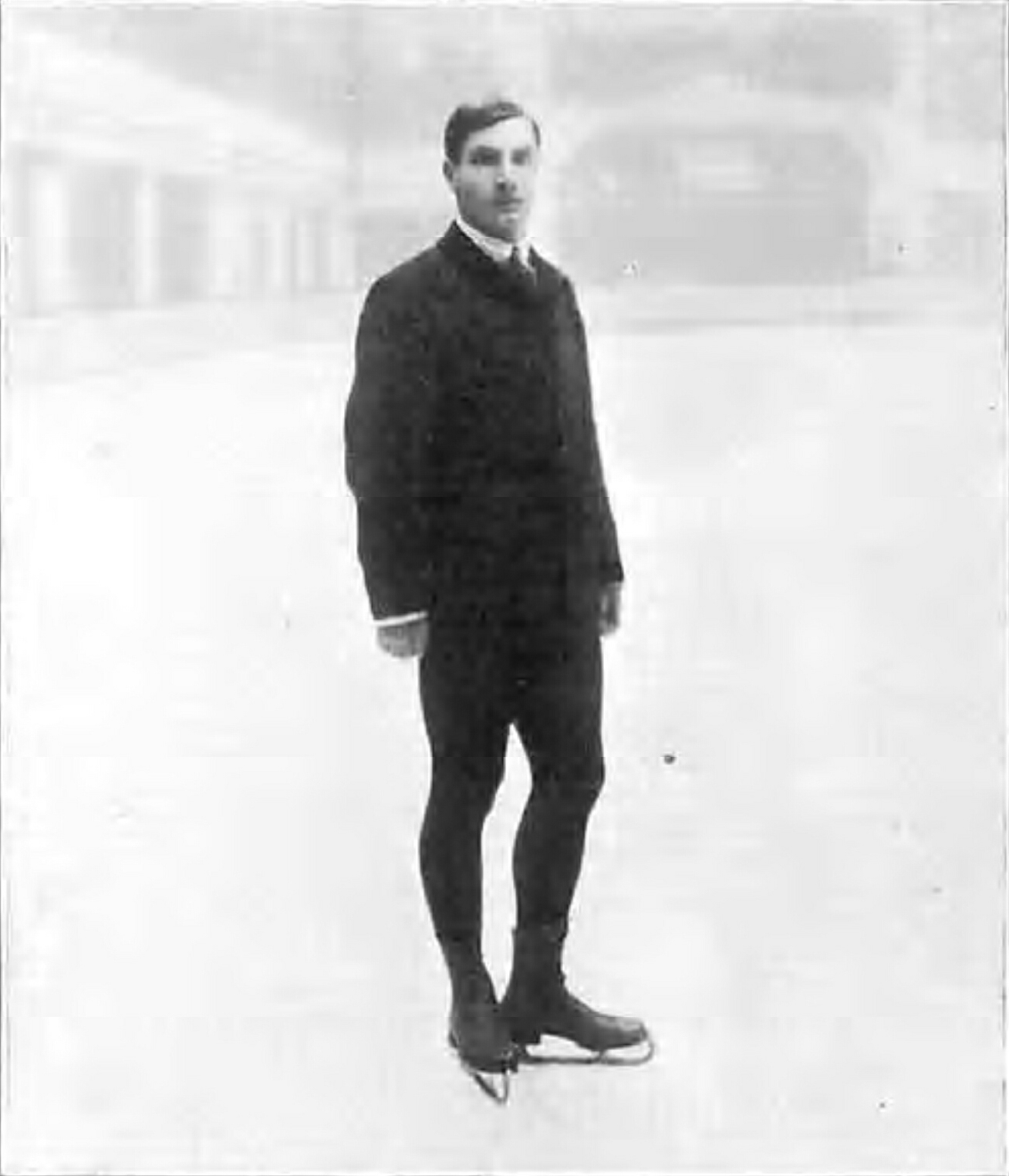
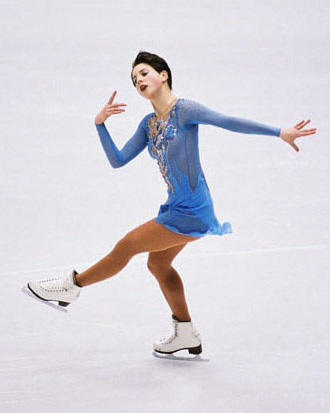
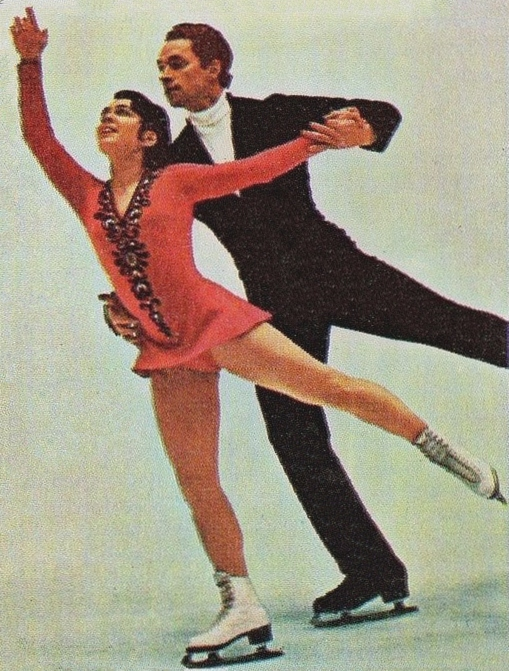
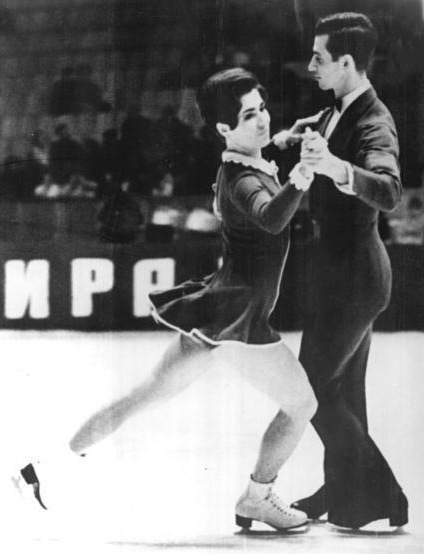
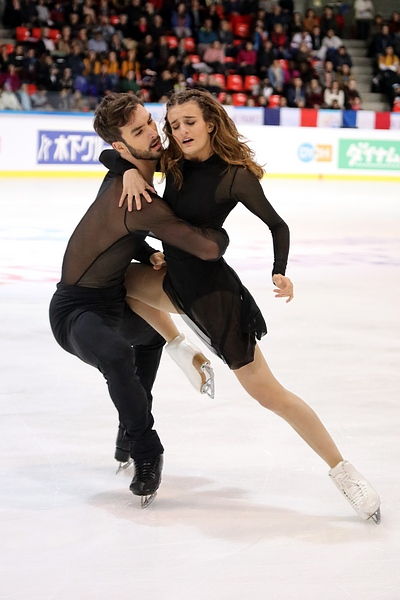
From left to right: Ulrich Salchow of Sweden won nine European Championship titles in men's singles; Irina Slutskaya of Russia won seven European Championship titles in women's singles; Irina Rodnina of the Soviet Union won eleven European Championship titles in pair skating, four of which were with Alexei Ulanov; Lyudmila Pakhomova and Aleksandr Gorshkov of the Soviet Union won six European Championship titles in ice dance; and Guillaume Cizeron of France won six European Championship titles in ice dance, five of which were with Gabriella Papadakis.

Records
Discipline	Most championship titles			
Discipline	Skater(s)	No.	Years	Ref.
Men's singles	(Sweden); Ulrich Salchow	9	1898–1900; 1904; 1906–07; 1909–10; 1913	
Women's singles	(Russia); Irina Slutskaya	7	1996–97; 2000–01; 2003; 2005–06	
Pairs	(Soviet Union); Irina Rodnina; (Note: Irina Rodnina won four championship titles while partnered with Alexei Ulanov (1969–72), and seven with Alexander Zaitsev (1973–78, 1980).)	11	1969–78; 1980	
Pairs	(Soviet Union); Irina Rodnina; Alexander Zaitsev	7	1973–78; 1980	
Ice dance	(France); Guillaume Cizeron; (Note: Guillaume Cizeron won five championship titles while partnered with Gabriella Papadakis (2015–19), and one with Laurence Fournier Beaudry (2026).)	6	2015–19; 2026	
Ice dance	(Soviet Union); Lyudmila Pakhomova; Aleksandr Gorshkov	6	1970–71; 1973–76	

== Cumulative medal table ==
- Countries or entities that can no longer participate for whatever reason are indicated in italics with a dagger (†).

Total number of European Championship medals by nation
Rank	Nation	Gold	Silver	Bronze	Total
1	Russia † (Note: Skaters from Russia have been banned from competing at all international skating events since 2022 due to the 2022 Russian invasion of Ukraine.)	70	64	56	190
2	Soviet Union †	51	58	46	155
3	Austria	45	37	37	119
4	France	33	31	28	92
5	Great Britain	27	38	43	108
6	East Germany †	23	10	18	51
7	Czechoslovakia †	16	13	14	43
8	Italy	14	19	17	50
9	West Germany †	13	16	18	47
10	Germany	12	22	16	50
11	Sweden	11	1	6	18
12	Hungary	10	14	13	37
13	Spain	7	0	0	7
14	Netherlands	6	3	3	12
14	Norway	6	3	3	12
16	Switzerland	5	10	5	20
17	Ukraine	3	6	8	17
18	Georgia	3	3	4	10
19	Finland	2	3	9	14
20	CIS † (Note: The Commonwealth of Independent States (CIS) was formed following the dissolution of the Soviet Union in 1991.)	2	3	3	8
21	Belgium	2	2	7	11
22	Estonia	2	1	0	3
23	Canada † (Note: Prior to 1948, skaters from nations outside of Europe were permitted to compete at the European Championships.)	2	0	0	2
24	Czech Republic	1	2	3	6
25	United States †	1	1	1	3
26	Poland	0	3	4	7
27	Bulgaria	0	2	1	3
28	Israel	0	1	0	1
28	Yugoslavia †	0	1	0	1
30	Lithuania	0	0	3	3
31	Latvia	0	0	1	1
Totals (31 entries)		367	367	367	1,101
