= 1898 World Figure Skating Championships =

Annual figure skating competition held in 1898

- Type: ISU Championship
- Date: February 15
- Season: 1898
- Location: London, United Kingdom

Champions
- Men's singles: (Sweden) Henning Grenander
- Previous: 1897 World Championships
- Next: 1899 World Championships

The 1898 World Figure Skating Championship were held February 15 in London, United Kingdom

== Competition ==
Four skaters competed; a fifth was entered and arrived at the competition, but he withdrew at the last moment; the Allgemeine Sport-Zeitung reported that he could not compete due to stage fright. The competition was well-attended, and the audience included Edward VII.

The competition was won by Henning Grenander of Sweden, who rose from third to first after a free skate praised for its originality; this was the only time he entered the World Championships. He and the second- and third-place contestants, Gustav Hügel and Gilbert Fuchs, were closely matched. The fourth-place finisher, Holt, struggled with the compulsory figures and did not attempt the ones done by skating backwards.

== Controversy ==
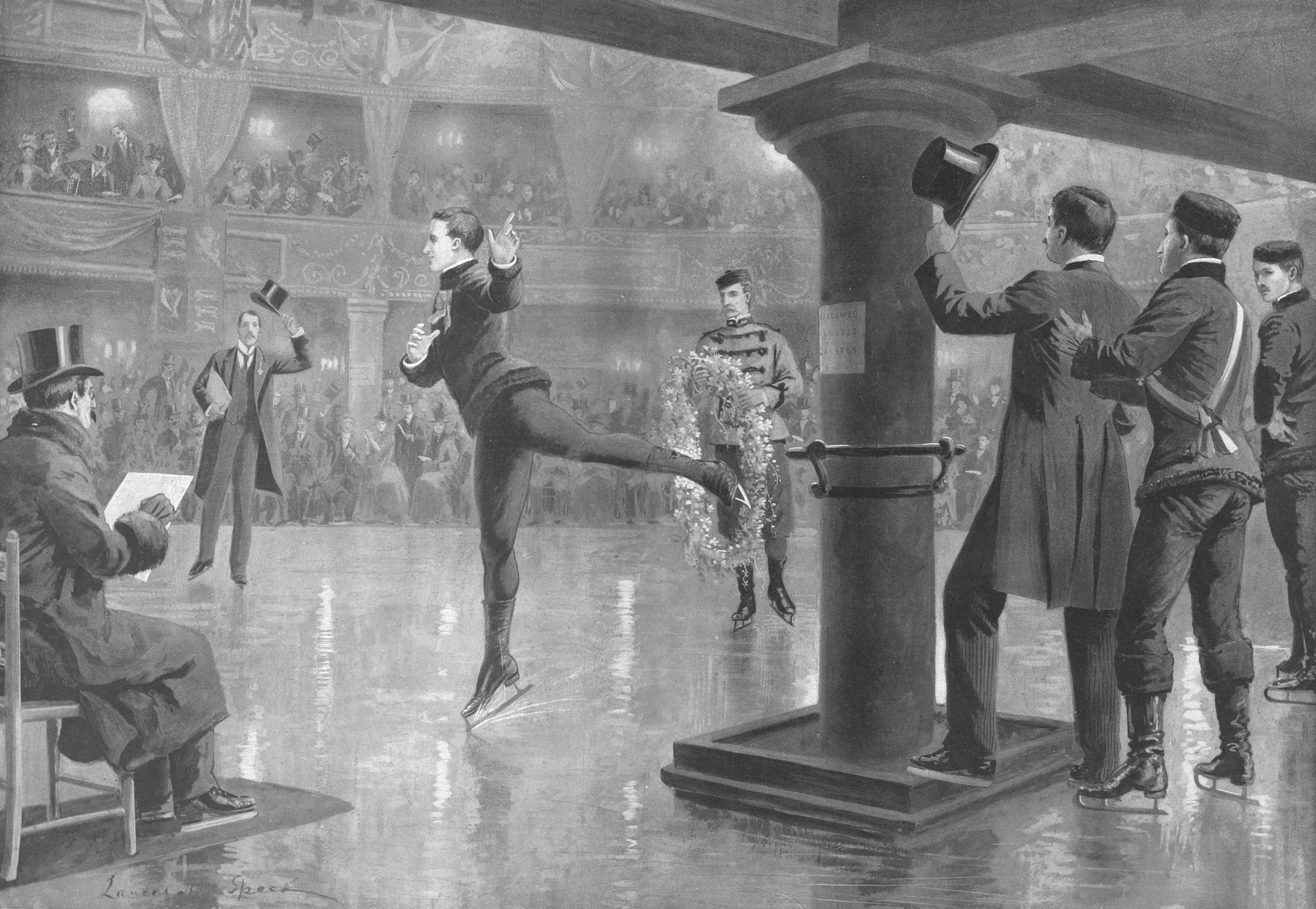
Illustration of Grenander skating an exhibition at the Championships

Hügel and Fuchs, who had won the championship in 1897 and 1896 respectively, filed a protest alleging that Grenander violated the rules with respect to size of the figures and their axes, and that the judges had overscored him with regard to difficult and variety in his free skating, having been biased by the enthusiastic reaction of the audience. The judges and the referee met and agreed on the following:

- Grenander's scores in the compulsory figures already reflected his mistakes
- The individuality of the skaters and judges had to be taken into account in the free skate
- The judges' scores must be considered to be final "in the absence of any truly extraordinary circumstances"
- The individual score sheets of all the judges would be published
- The protest would be rejected

The protest was criticized as being unsportsmanlike in the Allgemeine Sport-Zeitung, and the Vienna Ice Skating Association wrote a letter to the Austrian federation noting their disapproval of it. Hügel reacted with a letter of his own, in which he criticized the Vienna Ice Skating Association, Swedish judge von Rosen, and allowing Holt to compete at the Championships despite his low skill level. He noted that he and Fuchs had not previously protested when they lost at competitions, then evoked the controversy at the 1893 European Championships, another competition where a protest had been lodged against Grenander. (The winner of the 1893 European Championships was unclear due to differing interpretations of the scoring rules, and the competition results were later declared invalid.)

== Results ==
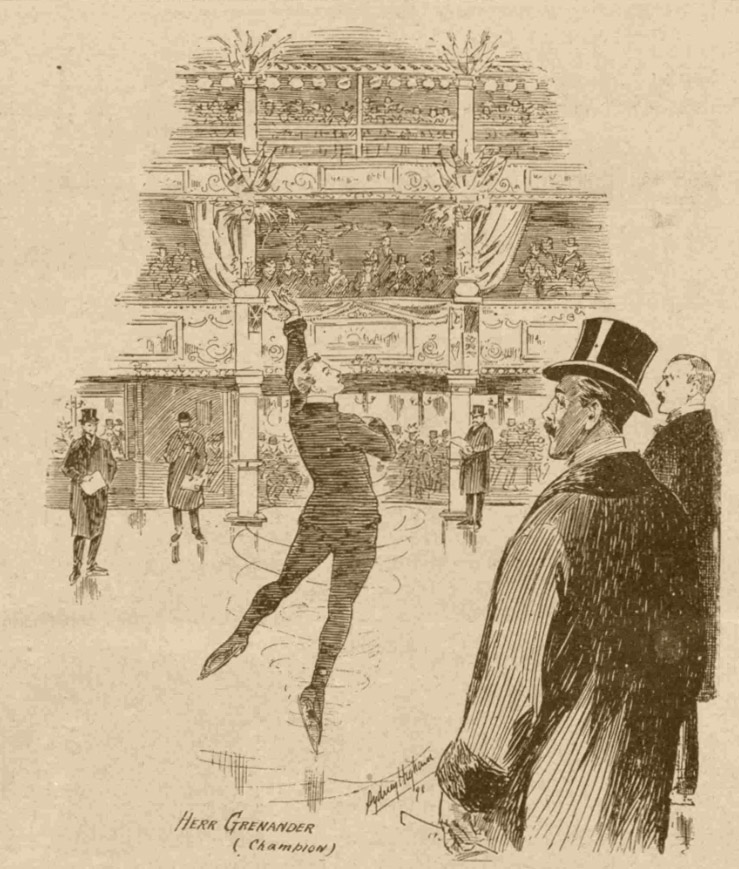
Illustration of Grenander at the Championships

Rank	Name	CF		FS		Total	Points	Places
1	(Sweden) Henning Grenander	3	892	1	531	1423	237.1	10
2	(Austrian Empire) Gustav Hügel	1	973	2	401	1374	229.0	13
3	(German Empire) Gilbert Fuchs	2	953	3	392	1345	224.1	13
4	(United Kingdom) H. C. Holt	4	181	4	198	379	63.1	24

- Referee: (Sweden) Viktor Balck

Judges:

- (United Kingdom) W. F. Adams
- (United Kingdom) C. E. Bell
- (Austrian Empire) Carl Fillunger
- (United Kingdom) A. F. Jenkin
- (Sweden) Clarence von Rosen
- (United Kingdom) J. H. Thomson
