= 1896 World Figure Skating Championships =

Annual figure skating competition held in 1896

- Type: ISU Championship
- Date: 9 February
- Season: 1896
- Location: Saint Petersburg, Russian Empire
- Venue: Yusupovsky Garden

Champions
- Men's singles: (Germany) Gilbert Fuchs
- Previous: –
- Next: 1897 World Championships

The 1896 World Figure Skating Championships was the first figure skating competition sanctioned by the International Skating Union in which figure skaters compete for the title of World Champion. The competition took place on 9 February, 1896 in Saint Petersburg, Russian Empire.

In 1895, the International Skating Union (ISU) organized the first World Figure Skating Championships committee, which consisted of 5 people. This committee was entrusted with creating the rules of figure skating for the 1897 Congress. Although the rules would not be formally published by 1896, the ISU confirmed that World Figure Skating Championships would be held and that in the meantime skaters should comply with the unpublished rules.

Four contestants competed in compulsory figures and free skating. The first World champion was Gilbert Fuchs, and the first silver medalist was Gustav Hügel, who had already won two silver medals at the European Championships. Georg Sanders, an American living in Russia, won the bronze medal, while Nikolay Poduskov finished in fourth place.

Between the compulsory figures and the free skating, a second competition was held for special figures, which Sanders won, followed by Fuchs and Hügel; a special prize was awarded to Hügel for a particularly well-executed spin.

== Results ==
=== Men ===
Rank	Name	CF	FS	Total
1	(German Empire) Gilbert Fuchs	205.2	99.4	304.6
2	(Austrian Empire) Gustav Hügel	187.8	91	278.8
3	(Russian Empire) Georgiy Sanders	120.2	77	197.2
4	(Russian Empire) Nikolay Poduskov	97	60.2	157.2

Judges:

- (German Empire) G. Helfrich
- (Russian Empire) Aleksandr Ivashentsov
- (Austrian Empire) von Körper
- (Finland) L. Kurtén
- (Russian Empire) Wolf
