= 1893 European Figure Skating Championships =

Figure skating competition

- Type: ISU Championship
- Date: January 21 – 22
- Season: 1893
- Location: Berlin, German Empire

Champions
- Men's singles: (Austrian Empire) Eduard Engelmann
- Previous: 1892 European Championships
- Next: 1894 European Championships

The 1893 European Figure Skating Championships were held from January 21 to 22 in Berlin, German Empire. Elite figure skaters competed for the title of European Champion in the category of men's singles.

== Event format and results ==
This was the first competition held by the International Skating Union (ISU), and as with the two previous editions, it was organized by the merged German/Austrian federation. Competitors performed compulsory figures and a free skate.

Rules for the precise event format and scoring were not yet established, and the event finish was controversial. The sponsor of the competition, the Berlin Skating Club, declared Henning Grenander the winner, while the merged German/Austrian federation declared Eduard Engelmann Jr. the winner. This came about because in point totals, Grenander came out just ahead (1988 points to Engelmann's 1987), but with half-points included, the result became a tie. Engelmann won the complsory figures, which served as the tiebreaker. Due to this controversy, the results of these Championships were declared invalid by the ISU Congress in 1895.

Rank	Name
1	(Austrian Empire) Eduard Engelmann
2	(Sweden) Henning Grenander
3	(Austrian Empire) Georg Zachariades
4	(Kingdom of Hungary) Tibor Földváry
5	(Austrian Empire) Carl Sage
6	(German Empire) Franz Zilly
7	(German Empire) Fritz Hellmund
8	(Norway) Johan Lefstad
