= 1900 European Figure Skating Championships =

Figure skating competition

- Type: ISU Championship
- Date: January 21
- Season: 1900
- Location: Berlin, German Empire

Champions
- Men's singles: (Sweden) Ulrich Salchow
- Previous: 1899 European Championships
- Next: 1901 European Championships

The 1900 European Figure Skating Championships were held on January 21 in Berlin, German Empire. Elite figure skaters competed for the title of European Champion in the category of men's singles. The competitors performed only compulsory figures.

== Results ==
| Rank | Name | Places |
|---|---|---|
| 1 | (Sweden) Ulrich Salchow | |
| 2 | (Austrian Empire) Gustav Hügel | |
| 3 | (Norway) Oscar Holthe | |
| 4 | (Norway) Johan Lefstad | |
| 5 | (German Empire) Franz Zilly | |

Judges:

- (German Empire) Kurt Dannenberg
- (German Empire) Hugo Ehrentraut
- (Sweden) I. Forssling
- (Switzerland) J. Olbeter
- (German Empire) Schiess (admiral)
