= 1897 World Figure Skating Championships =

Annual figure skating competition held in 1897

- Type: ISU Championship
- Date: 13 February – 14
- Season: 1897
- Location: Stockholm, Sweden-Norway

Champions
- Men's singles: (Austria) Gustav Hügel
- Previous: 1896 World Championships
- Next: 1898 World Championships

The 1897 World Figure Skating Championship was held 13 and 14 February 1897, in Stockholm, Sweden at Nybroviken.

Seven competitors were registered; however, due to poor weather, one was unable to reach Stockholm. The compulsory figures competition was held on the 14th in very poor weather, with cracked ice and temperatures of −12 °C (10 °F). Carlsson performed his figures after all the other competitors due to mistakenly arriving late.

In the afternoon, competitors performed their free skating. Gustav Hügel, competing despite injuring his leg in Hamburg, removed his most difficult elements but won the competition. The competitors gave a special performance for Gustaf V and met with him individually.

== Results ==
Rank	Name
1	(Austrian Empire) Gustav Hügel
2	(Sweden) Ulrich Salchow
3	(Norway) Johan Lefstad
4	(Sweden) Thiodolf Borgh
5	(Sweden) Hugo Carlsson
6	(Norway) Oscar Holthe
