= Gustav Hügel =

Austrian figure skater

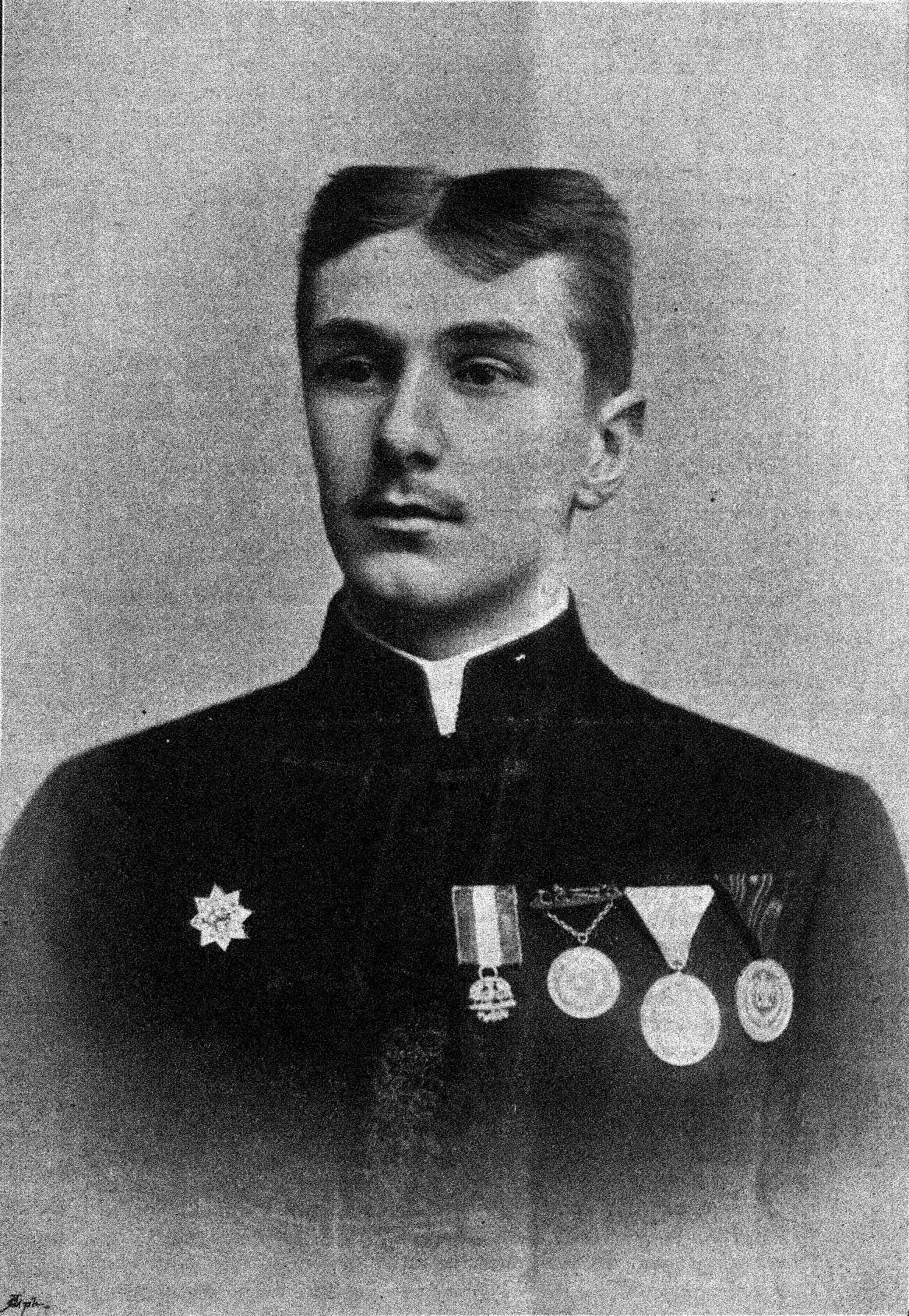

Personal information
- Born: 1871
- Died: 6 April 1953 (aged 81–82) Vienna, Austria

Figure skating career
- Country: Austria-Hungary
- Discipline: Men's singles
Medal record
Representing Austria-Hungary
Men's Figure skating
World Championships
Gold medal – first place	1900 Davos	Men's singles
Gold medal – first place	1899 Davos	Men's singles
Silver medal – second place	1898 London	Men's singles
Gold medal – first place	1897 Stockholm	Men's singles
Silver medal – second place	1896 St. Petersburg	Men's singles
European Championships
Gold medal – first place	1901 Vienna	Men's singles
Silver medal – second place	1900 Berlin	Men's singles
Silver medal – second place	1899 Davos	Men's singles
Silver medal – second place	1895 Budapest	Men's singles
Silver medal – second place	1894 Vienna	Men's singles
German Championships
Gold medal – first place	1894 Olomouc	Men's singles
Silver medal – second place	1895 Bonn	Men's singles

Gustav Hügel (1871—6 April 1953) was an Austrian figure skater. He was a three-time (1897 and 1899-1900) World Champion and the 1901 European Champion. He won the German national championships in 1894 because, at that time, Austria and Germany held joint championships.

== Career ==
Hügel was the son of the publisher and editor in chief of the Wiener Vorstadt-Zeitung newspaper. He began ice skating when he was 12 and was trained by Leopold Frey. He placed 6th in his first European Championships in 1892, the only time he placed lower than second in a major international competition.

He did not compete in 1893 due to being required to fulfill military service. The next year, 1894, his career took off. That year, he won the German Championships, and he placed second at the 1894 European Championships. The next year, he was defeated by Gilbert Fuchs at the German Championships but placed first ahead of Fuchs at a competition in Davos. He again placed second at the 1895 European Championships.

In 1896, at the first World Championships, he placed second. He went on to win his first World title at the 1897 World Championships. He lost to Henning Grenander at the 1898 World Championships but returned to win two more consecutive titles in 1899 and 1900. He also won two consecutive silver medals at the European Championships in 1899 and 1900, then won the title in 1901.

Hügel was known for his skill in special figures. He is also credited with adding steps for a follower to the Schöller-Schritt, an ice waltz created by Franz Schöller, turning it into the tenstep, the first dance meant specifically for ice skating.

After his competitive career, Hügel worked as a coach and owned a sports complex in Hietzing that acted as tennis courts in the summer and an outdoors ice skating rink in the winter. Skaters he coached included:

- Emília Rotter and László Szollás
- Olga Orgonista and Sándor Szalay
- Piroska Szekrényessy and Attila Szekrényessy
- Dénes Pataky
- Elemér Terták
- Gillis Grafström
- Vivi-Anne Hultén
- Cecilia Colledge

== Death ==
Hügel died on 6 April 1953. He was buried in Feuerhalle Simmering in Vienna.

== Results ==
Event	1892	1893	1894	1895	1896	1897	1898	1899	1900	1901
World Championships					2nd	1st	2nd	1st	1st	
European Championships	6th		2nd	2nd				2nd	2nd	1st
German Championships			1st	2nd						
