= Oskar Uhlig =

German figure skater

Figure skating career
- Country: Germany
Medal record
Representing Germany
Men's Figure skating
European Championships
Gold medal – first place	1891 Hamburg	Men's singles

Oskar Uhlig was a German figure skater. He won the first European Figure Skating Championships to be contested.

He represented Berliner Eislaufverein von 1886. On 12 October 1893 he was elected as the chairman of the club Berliner Eislaufverein von 1886. From 1900 on, he was vice-chairman of the club.

In 1894, Uhlig was also a referee of speed skating events.

== Figure skating result ==
Event	1891
European Championships	1st
