= 1898 European Figure Skating Championships =

Figure skating competition

- Type: ISU Championship
- Date: February 26
- Season: 1898
- Location: Trondheim, Sweden-Norway

Champions
- Men's singles: (Sweden) Ulrich Salchow
- Previous: 1895 European Championships
- Next: 1899 European Championships

The 1898 European Figure Skating Championships were held on February 26 in Trondheim, Norway. Elite figure skaters competed for the title of European Champion in the category of men's singles. The competitors performed only compulsory figures.

== Results ==
| Rank | Name | Places |
|---|---|---|
| 1 | (Sweden) Ulrich Salchow | 7 |
| 2 | (Norway) Johan Lefstad | 8 |
| 3 | (Norway) Oscar Holthe | 15 |

Judges:

- (Norway) H. Bratt
- (Norway) A. Gellein
- (Norway) Kindt
- (Norway) J. Kunig
- (Norway) H. N. Stabel

== Sources ==
- Result List provided by the ISU
