= Gilbert Fuchs =

German figure skater

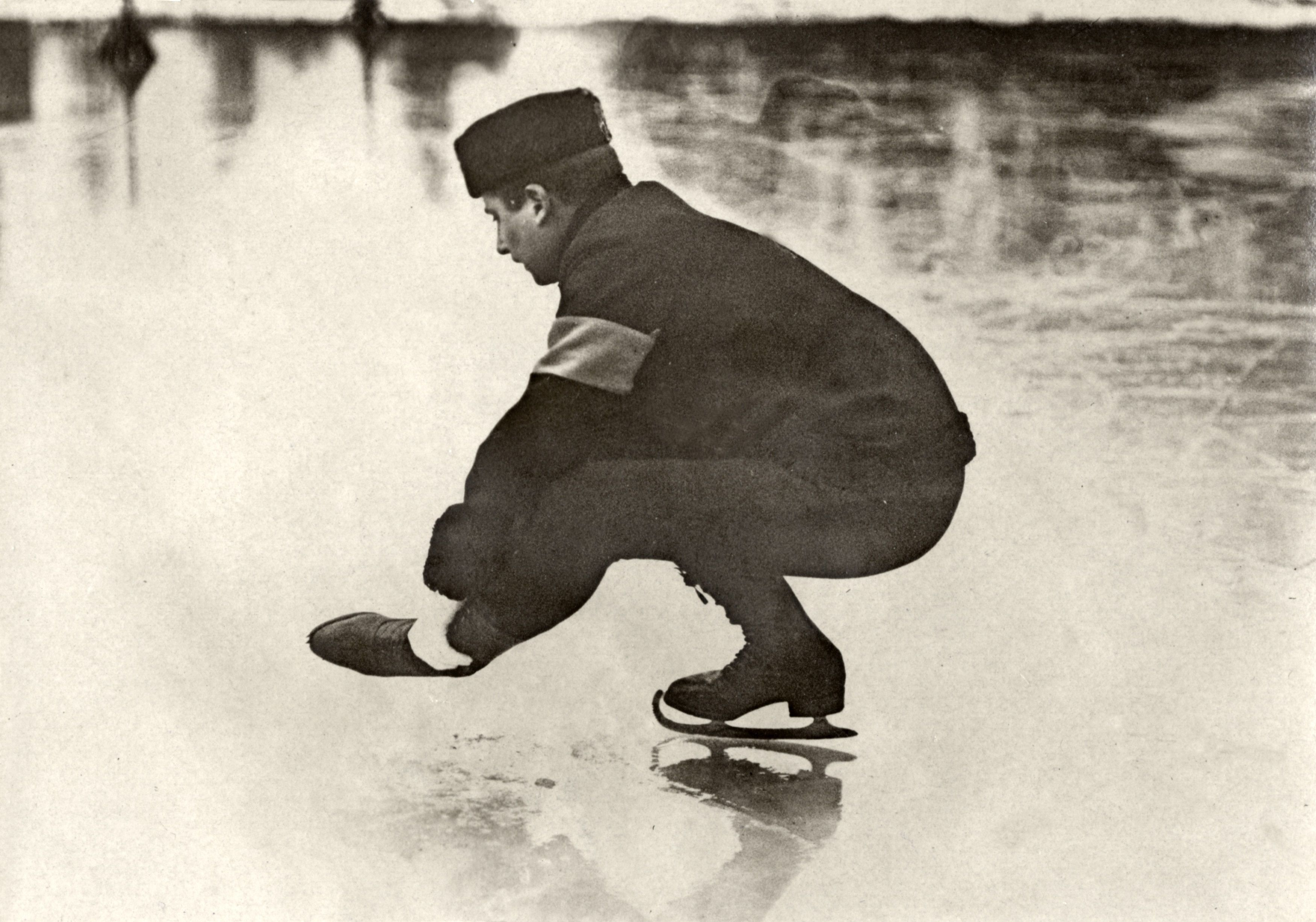

Personal information
- Born: 1871 Graz, Austria-Hungary
- Died: 1952 (aged 80–81) West Germany

Figure skating career
- Country: Germany
Medal record
Representing Germany
Men's Figure skating
World Championships
Gold medal – first place	1896 St. Petersburg	Men's singles
Gold medal – first place	1906 Munich	Men's singles
Silver medal – second place	1901 Stockholm	Men's singles
Silver medal – second place	1908 Troppau	Men's singles
Bronze medal – third place	1898 London	Men's singles
Bronze medal – third place	1907 Vienna	Men's singles
European Championships
Silver medal – second place	1901 Vienna	Men's singles
Silver medal – second place	1907 Vienna	Men's singles
Silver medal – second place	1909 Budapest	Men's singles
Bronze medal – third place	1895 Budapest	Men's singles
German Championships
Gold medal – first place	1895 Bonn	Men's singles
Gold medal – first place	1896 Darmstadt	Men's singles
Gold medal – first place	1909 Munich	Men's singles

Gilbert Fuchs (1871–1952) was a German figure skater who won the first World Figure Skating Championships, held in St. Petersburg, Russia, in 1896. He recaptured the world title ten years later in Munich.

Relations with his constant rival Ulrich Salchow were strained. In 1906, Salchow did not compete in Fuchs' hometown of Munich, because he expected that he would be judged unfairly. Likewise, Fuchs did not participate in the 1908 Olympics as he felt the judges favored Salchow. Only once did Fuchs place higher in a competition than Salchow, at the 1901 Europeans in Vienna; he did not win the event, however, finishing in second place to Gustav Hügel of Austria.

Fuchs mastered figure skating on his own, after learning gymnastics, weightlifting, and stone put. After finishing secondary school, he served in a cavalry regiment, later studying agriculture in Vienna. Still later, he moved to Munich in the German state of Bavaria, where he studied forestry. He practised figure skating on Germany's first artificial ice rink, "Unsöldsche Kunsteisbahn", which opened in 1892, and he represented Munich EV and Germany in competitions. Fuchs was a founding member of the Karlsruhe Ice Skating Club, founded in 1911. He wrote a book titled "Theory and Practice of Figure Skating" (German: "Theorie und Praxis des Kunstlaufes am Eise"), published in 1926.

Outside figure skating, Fuchs studied the morphology of the bark beetle (German: Borkenkäfer). In 1929, in his late fifties, he wrote a PhD thesis titled "European timber industry after the war" (German: "Europäische Holzwirtschaft der Nachkriegszeit") (the title refers to the First World War).

== Results ==
Event	1895	1896	1897	1898	1899	1900	1901	1902	1903	1904	1905	1906	1907	1908	1909
World Championships		1st	^{†}	3rd			2nd					1st	3rd	2nd	
European Championships	3rd						2nd						2nd		2nd
German Championships	1st	1st													1st

^{†} Did not enter after being injured in a hunting accident in the high mountains
