= A. Schmitson =

German figure skater

Figure skating career
- Country: Germany
Medal record
Representing Germany
Men's figure skating
European Championships
Silver medal – second place	1891 Hamburg	Men

A. Schmitson was a German figure skater who competed in men's singles.

He won the silver medal at the first-ever European Figure Skating Championship (held in Hamburg in 1891).

== Competitive highlights ==
Event	1891
European Championships	2nd
German Championships	1st
