= 1901 European Figure Skating Championships =

Figure skating competition

- Type: ISU Championship
- Date: January 13
- Season: 1901
- Location: (Austrian Empire) Vienna, Austria-Hungary

Champions
- Men's singles: (Austrian Empire) Gustav Hügel
- Previous: 1900 European Championships
- Next: 1904 European Championships

The 1901 European Figure Skating Championships were held on January 13 in Vienna, Austria. Elite figure skaters competed for the title of European Champion in the category of men's singles. The competitors performed only compulsory figures.

The following two years the Europeans were planned to be held in Amsterdam, Netherlands. Both these years there was no ice in Amsterdam. In 1902, the championships were cancelled. In 1903, the championship were moved to Stockholm, Sweden, but in Stockholm was on only one contestant. Therefore, also in 1903 the Europeans were cancelled. The Europeans were continued in 1904.

== Results ==
Rank	Name	Places
1	(Austrian Empire) Gustav Hügel	5
2	(German Empire) Gilbert Fuchs	11
3	(Sweden) Ulrich Salchow	14

Judges:

- (German Empire) Hugo Ehrentraut
- (Austrian Empire) Ludwig Fänner
- (Kingdom of Hungary) Tibor Földváry
- (Austrian Empire) Karl Kaiser
- (Russian Empire) Vyacheslav Sreznevsky

== Sources ==
- Result List provided by the ISU
