= Georg Sanders =

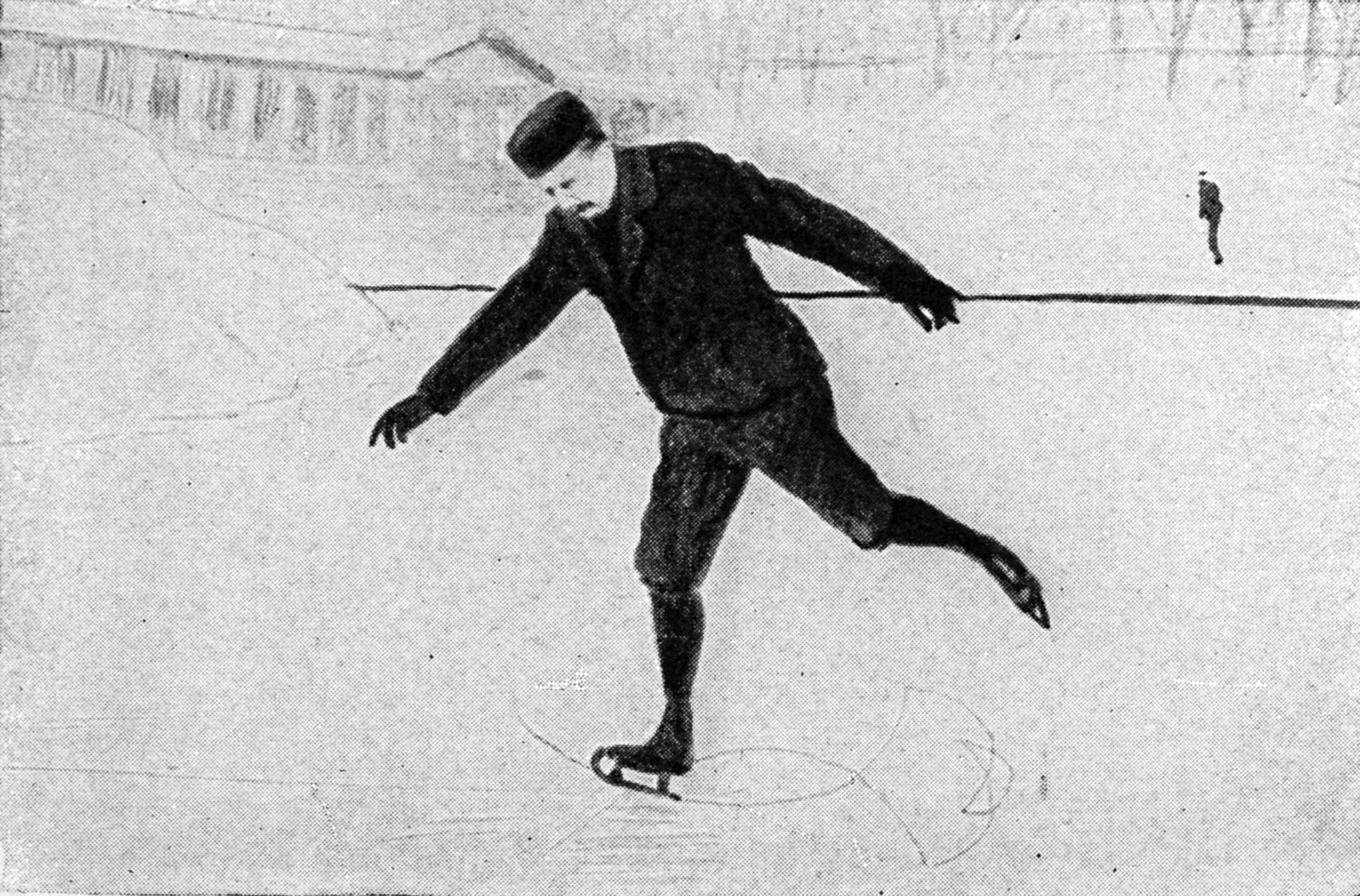
- Sanders performing a figure in 1901

Figure skating career
- Country: Russia
Medal record
Representing Russia
Men's Figure skating
World Championships
Bronze medal – third place	1896 Saint Petersburg	Men's singles

Georg Sanders (Russian: Георгий Фёдорович Сандерс) was a Russian figure skater and the first bronze medalist at the World Championships.

== Career ==
Sanders, an American living in Russia, won the bronze medal in men's single skating at the first World Figure Skating Championships, held in 1896 in Saint Petersburg.

He did not compete in any other competitions held by the International Skating Union. He was primarily known for his special figures and wrote a chapter about the subject in Irving Brokaw's 1910 book, The Art of Skating.

== Competitive highlights ==
Event	1896
World Figure Skating Championships	3rd
