= Paul Thomas (figure skater) =

British former ice dancer

Personal information
- Full name: Paul Thomas

Figure skating career
- Country: United Kingdom
- Partner: Pamela Weight; Nesta Davies
- Retired: 1956
Medal record
Figure skating
Ice dancing
Representing United Kingdom
Gold medal – first place	1956 Garmisch-Partenkirchen	Ice dancing
Silver medal – second place	1955 Vienna	Ice dancing
Silver medal – second place	1954 Oslo	Ice dancing
European Championships
Gold medal – first place	1956 Paris	Ice dancing
Silver medal – second place	1955 Budapest	Ice dancing
Silver medal – second place	1954 Bolzano	Ice dancing

Paul Thomas is a British former ice dancer. With partner Pamela Weight, he is the 1956 World champion and European champion. With partner Nesta Davies, he is the 1954 World & European silver medalist. He currently coaches at the Calalta Figure Skating Club in Calgary, Alberta

== Results ==
(with Nesta Davies)

Event	1953	1954
World Championships	4th	2nd
European Championships		2nd

(with Pamela Weight)

Event	1955	1956
World Championships	2nd	1st
European Championships	2nd	1st
British Championships		1st
