= Paul Falk =

Paul Falk may refer to:

- Paul Falk (figure skater) (1921–2017), German pair figure skater
- Paul Falk (actor) (born 1996), German actor
