= Ernst Fellner =

Austrian figure skater

Personal information
- Born: 12 January 1880 Vienna, Austria-Hungary
- Died: 14 May 1900 (aged 20) Vienna, Austria-Hungary

Figure skating career
- Country: Austria
Medal record
Representing Austria
Men's figure skating
European Championships
Bronze medal – third place	1899 Davos	Men

Ernst Fellner (12 January 1880 – 14 May 1900) was an Austrian figure skater who competed in men's singles.

He won the bronze medal at the 1899 European Figure Skating Championships.

== Competitive highlights ==
Event	1898	1899
European Championships		3rd
Austrian Championships	2nd	
