= Tibor von Földváry =

Hungarian figure skater

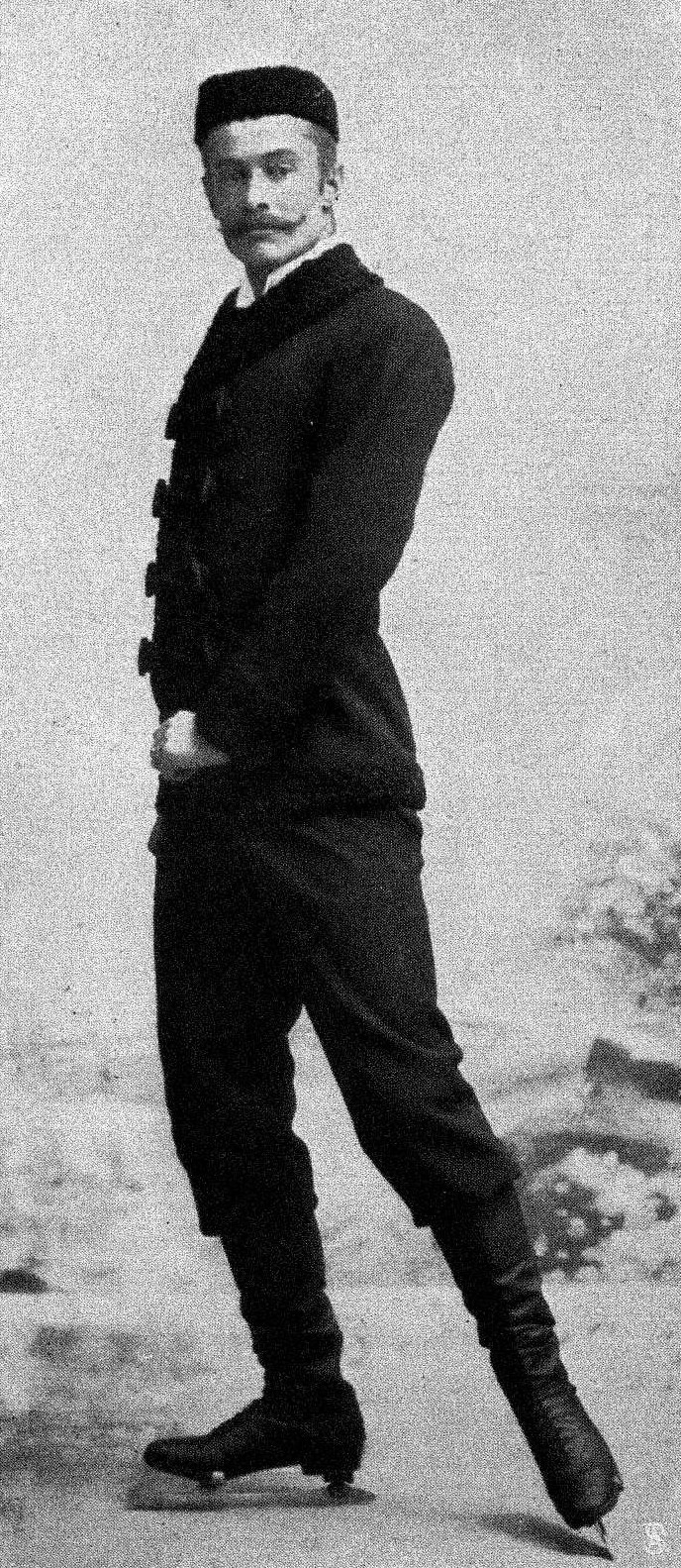

Personal information
- Born: July 5, 1863 Öttevény, Austrian Empire
- Died: March 27, 1912 (aged 48) Budapest, Austria-Hungary

Figure skating career
- Country: Hungary
Medal record
Representing Hungary
Men's Figure skating
European Championships
Gold medal – first place	1895 Budapest	Men's singles
Bronze medal – third place	1894 Vienna	Men's singles
Silver medal – second place	1892 Vienna	Men's singles

Tibor von Földváry (5 July 1863 – 27 March 1912) was a Hungarian figure skater, born in Öttevény. He was the 1895 European champion and afterward worked on developing the sport and acted as a judge.

== Personal life ==
Földváry was born July 5, 1863, in Öttevény and was a landowner in Győr–Moson–Sopron County. He had two siblings; his sister, Valéria, married politician Károly Csáky.

== Career ==
Coached by Leopold Frey, Földváry became a pioneer in Hungarian figure skating as a sport and won three medals at the European Figure Skating Championships: silver in 1892, bronze in 1894, and gold in 1895. He also competed in 1893 and placed 4th, though the results of that competition were annulled in 1895.

Földváry was deaf. His friends supposedly helped him win the 1895 European Championships, held in Budapest, by indicating the tempo of his free skating music.

After winning the European Championships in 1895, he retired from competition and focused on developing the sport, including working on the first international rulebook, to which he significantly contributed, and he acted as a judge. He died in Budapest in 1912 after a long illness and was buried in his family's tomb in Péteri.

A sports hall in his hometown is named after him. The Benke Award trophy, previously given to Hungarian national champions, was modeled on Földváry.

== Results ==
Event	1892	1893	1894	1895
European Championships	2nd	4th	3rd	1st
