= 1899 European Figure Skating Championships =

Figure skating competition

- Type: ISU Championship
- Date: January 14 – 15
- Season: 1899
- Location: Davos, Switzerland

Champions
- Men's singles: (Sweden) Ulrich Salchow
- Previous: 1898 European Championships
- Next: 1900 European Championships

The 1899 European Figure Skating Championships were held from January 14th to 15th in Davos, Switzerland. Elite figure skaters competed for the title of European Champion in the category of men's singles. The competitors performed only compulsory figures.

== Results ==
Rank	Name	Places
1	(Sweden) Ulrich Salchow	8
2	(Austrian Empire) Gustav Hügel	10
3	(Austrian Empire) Ernst Fellner	12
4	(German Empire) Martin Gordan	20

Judges:

- (Sweden) K. Collin
- (Switzerland) F. von Groote
- (Switzerland) J. Günther
- (United Kingdom) J. H. Nation
- (Switzerland) F. Stahel
