= 1894 European Figure Skating Championships =

Figure skating competition

- Type: ISU Championship
- Date: January 28
- Season: 1894
- Location: (Austrian Empire) Vienna, Austria-Hungary

Champions
- Men's singles: (Austrian Empire) Eduard Engelmann
- Previous: 1893 European Championships
- Next: 1895 European Championships

The 1894 European Figure Skating Championships were held on January 28 in Vienna, Austria. Elite figure skaters competed for the title of European Champion in the category of men's singles.

Only five skaters competed. Eduard Engelmann Jr. won his third consecutive title.

== Results ==
Rank	Name	Points
1	(Austrian Empire) Eduard Engelmann	
2	(Austrian Empire) Gustav Hügel	
3	(Kingdom of Hungary) Tibor Földváry	237.3
4	(Austrian Empire) Georg Zachariades	
5	(Austrian Empire) Carl Sage	
