= 1895 European Figure Skating Championships =

Figure skating competition

- Type: ISU Championship
- Date: January 26
- Season: 1895
- Location: (Kingdom of Hungary) Budapest, Austria-Hungary

Champions
- Men's singles: (Kingdom of Hungary) Tibor Földváry
- Previous: 1894 European Championships
- Next: 1898 European Championships

The 1895 European Figure Skating Championships were held on January 26 in Budapest, Hungary. Elite figure skaters competed for the title of European Champion in the category of men's singles.

== Event format and results. ==
Competitors competed in compulsory figures and free skating. Only three men competed at the event. Gold was won by Tibor von Földváry, who had won bronze the previous year, and Gustav Hügel won a second consecutive silver medal. A fourth intended competitor, Arthur Dezsö, withdrew.

Rank	Name
1	(Kingdom of Hungary) Tibor Földváry
2	(Austrian Empire) Gustav Hügel
3	(German Empire) Gilbert Fuchs
WD	(Kingdom of Hungary) Artúr Dezső
