= Nicolai Poduskov =

Russian figure skater

Figure skating career
- Country: Russia

Nicolai Poduskov (Russian: Николай Подусков) was a Russian figure skater. He placed fourth out of four competitors in men's single skating at the first World Figure Skating Championships, held in 1896 in Saint Petersburg.

== Competitive highlights ==
Event	1896
World Figure Skating Championships	4th
