= 1891 European Figure Skating Championships =

Figure skating competition

- Type: ISU Championship
- Date: January 23 – 24
- Season: 1891
- Location: Hamburg, German Empire

Champions
- Men's singles: (German Empire) Oskar Uhlig
- Previous: -
- Next: 1892 European Championships

The 1891 European Figure Skating Championships were held on January 23 and 24 in Hamburg, German Empire. Elite figure skaters competed for the title of European Champion in the category of men's singles. The competitors performed only compulsory figures. These were the first European Figure Skating Championships ever.

The skating association of Germany and Austria merged and organised these first European Championships in figure skating before the International Skating Union (ISU) was founded in 1892.

== Results ==
Rank	Name
1	(German Empire) Oskar Uhlig
2	(German Empire) Anon Schmitson
3	(German Empire) Franz Zilly
4	(Austrian Empire) Josef Nowy
5	(Austrian Empire) Willi Dienstl
6	(German Empire) Fritz Ahrendt
7	(German Empire) Wilhelm Schulze
