= Öttevény =

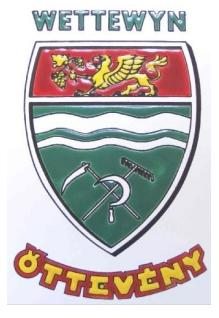
- Coat of arms

- Location of Győr-Moson-Sopron county in Hungary

- Location of Öttevény
- Coordinates: 47.72545°N 17.48915°E
- Country: Hungary
- County: Győr-Moson-Sopron

Area
  - Total: 23.66 km^{2} (9.14 sq mi)

Population (2004)
  - Total: 2,816
  - Density: 119.01/km^{2} (308.2/sq mi)
- Time zone: UTC+1 (CET)
  - Summer (DST): UTC+2 (CEST)
- Postal code: 9153
- Area code: 96
- Motorways: M1
- Distance from Budapest: 139 km (86 mi) East

Öttevény is a village in Győr-Moson-Sopron county, Hungary.

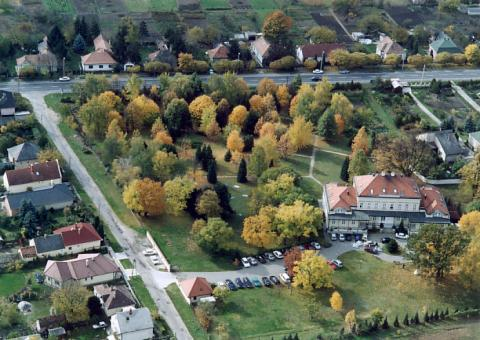
Aerial photograph of Öttevény
