= Oscar Holthe =

Norwegian figure skater (1872-1970)

Personal information
- Born: 3 September 1872
- Died: 28 January 1970 (aged 97)

Figure skating career
- Country: Norway
Medal record
Representing Norway
Men's figure skating
European Championships
Bronze medal – third place	1898 Trondheim	Men
Bronze medal – third place	1900 Berlin	Men

Oscar Holthe (3 September 1872 – 28 January 1970) was a Norwegian figure skater who competed in men's singles.

He won the bronze medals at the 1898 and 1900 European Figure Skating Championships.

== Competitive highlights ==
Event	1894	1895	1896	1897	1898	1899	1900	1901	1902	1903	1904	1905	1906
World Championships				6th									
European Championships					3rd		3rd						
Norwegian Championships	2nd	3rd	2nd			2nd	2nd	1st	1st	1st	2nd	1st	1st
