= Paul Falk (actor) =

German actor

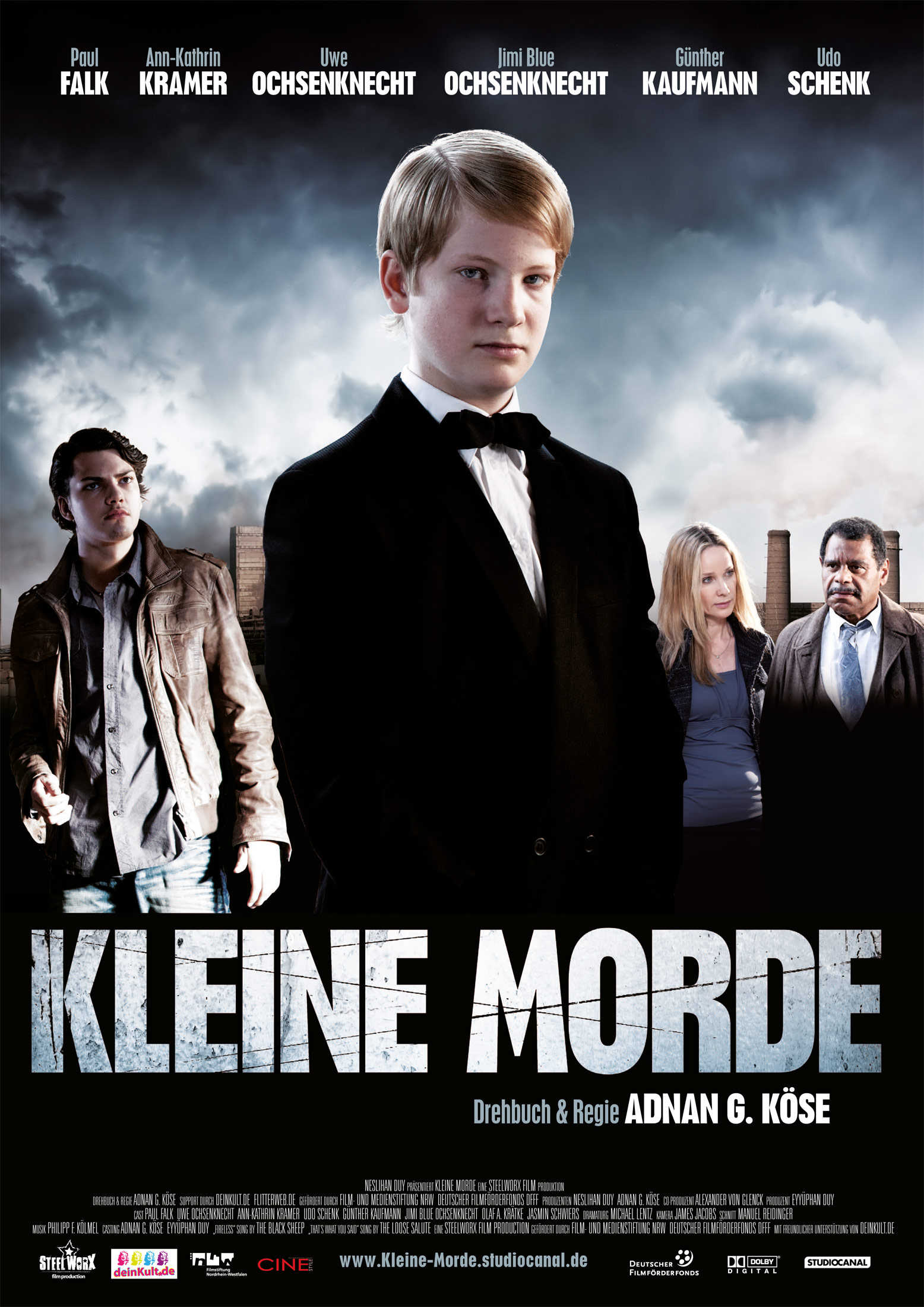
- Falk in the Kleine Morde theatrical poster
- Born: 17 December 1996 (age 29); Düsseldorf, Germany
- Occupation: Actor
- Years active: 2008–present

Paul Falk (German pronunciation: [paʊ̯l ˈfalk]; born 17 December 1996) is a German actor.

== Life and career ==
Falk was born in Düsseldorf, to Angelica and Dieter Falk. He has an older brother, Max.

Since the age of 8 he has recited various roles in several musicals for children such as Mose – ein echt cooler Retter and Joseph – ein echt cooler Träumer. He is currently the main character (narrator) in Die 10 Gebote (with Dieter Falk and Michael Kunze), which also contributed to the melody of a song.

He also works as a voice actor. He voiced the character of Macius in the German version of the film Little King Macius – The Movie (2006), which was originally intended spokesman, and was therefore, in the category herausragende Nachwuchsleistung the Preis für Deutsche Synchron 2008. He also voiced the character in the second season of the television series of the same name. from 2007 to 2018 he performed the pre-recorded Voice Control in the musical Starlight Express in Bochum. His voice can be heard on the 25th anniversary live cast album.

Along with his brother Max and his father, representing the band Falk & Sons, he played in the tour Celebrate Bach. The self-titled album was released in November 2011 by the Universal Music Group Deutschland.

In June 2012, the film was presented at the Kleine Bites Film Festival in Shanghai. Paul plays his first starring role in Little Murders, along with Uwe Ochsenknecht and Ann-Kathrin Kramer.

== Filmography ==
Year	Title	Role	Notes
2006	Little King Macius – The Movie	Macius	Based on the 2002 cartoon "Little King Macius"; replaces Maxmillian Artajo.
2008	Cologne P.D.	Tom Timmermann	
2010	Alarm für Cobra 11 – Die Autobahnpolizei	Ellis	
2012	Little Murders	Martin Brinkhoff	
2012	Das Millionen Rennen	Ronny	

== Awards and nominations ==
Year	Award	Category	Work	Result
2012	Deutschen Preis für Synchron	Herausragende Nachwuchsleistung	Der kleine König Macius – Der Film	Nominated
