= Franz Zilly =

German figure skater

Figure skating career
- Country: Germany
Medal record
Representing Germany
Men's figure skating
European Championships
Bronze medal – third place	1891 Hamburg	Men

Franz Zilly was a German figure skater who competed in men's singles.

He won the bronze medal at the first-ever European Figure Skating Championship (held in Hamburg in 1891).

== Competitive highlights ==
Event	1891	1892	1893	1900
European Championships	3rd		6th	5th
