= Johan Lefstad =

Norwegian figure skater

Personal information
- Born: 1870
- Died: 1948 (aged 77–78)

Figure skating career
- Country: Norway
Medal record
Representing Norway
Men's figure skating
World Championships
Bronze medal – third place	1897 Stockholm	Men

Johan Peter Lefstad (1870–1948) was a Norwegian figure skater who competed in men's singles.

He won the bronze medal in men's single skating at the 1897 World Figure Skating Championships.

== Competitive highlights ==
Event	1893	1894	1895	1896	1897	1898	1899	1900	1904	1906
World Championships					3rd					
European Championships	8th					2nd		4th		
Norwegian Championships		1st	1st	1st	1st		1st	1st	1st	2nd
