= 1908 in sports =

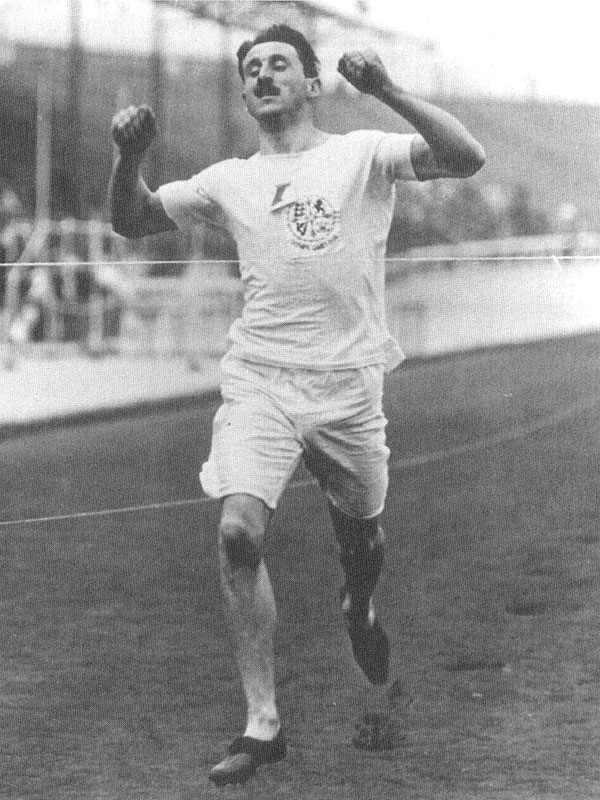
Wyndham Halswelle wins the 400 m at the 1908 Olympics

1908 in sports describes the year's events in world sport.

== American football ==
College championship

- College football national championship – Penn Quakers

== Association football ==
Belgium

- R.S.C. Anderlecht was founded in Brussels Region on May 27.

Brazil

- 25 March — Clube Atlético Mineiro founded

England

- The Football League – Manchester United 52 points, Aston Villa 43, Manchester City 43, Newcastle United 42, The Wednesday 42, Middlesbrough 41
- FA Cup final – Wolverhampton Wanderers 3–1 Newcastle United at Crystal Palace, London
- Bradford Park Avenue (1908–70) and Tottenham Hotspur elected to the Football League after Lincoln City and Stoke FC are expelled. Stoke FC is not involved in the election process but goes into receivership soon afterwards and is replaced by Tottenham Hotspur, who have lost the election to Bradford Park Avenue.

Germany

- National Championship – Viktoria Berlin 3–0 Stuttgarter Kickers at Berlin-Tempelhof

Greece

- 3 February — Panathinaikos, Greece's most successful sports club is founded in Athens, Greece by Georgios Kalafatis.

Italy

- 9 March — Internazionale Milan founded

Mexico

- Club Union of Mexico becomes Club Deportivo Guadalajara

Netherlands

- 19 July — Feyenoord Rotterdam founded

Scotland

- Scottish Football League – Celtic
- Scottish Cup final – Celtic 5–1 St Mirren at Hampden Park

== Australian rules football ==
VFL Premiership

- Carlton wins the 12th VFL Premiership: Carlton 5.5 (35) d Essendon 3.8 (26) at Melbourne Cricket Ground (MCG)

Events

- Richmond and University join the VFL

== Bandy ==
Sweden

- Championship final – Djurgårdens IF 3–1 Östergötlands BF

== Baseball ==
World Series

- 10–14 October — Chicago Cubs (NL) defeats Detroit Tigers (AL) to win the 1908 World Series by 4 games to 1

Events

- 23 September — the Merkle incident, which finally costs New York Giants the NL pennant
- Major League Baseball's lowest scoring season including the current record for fewest runs scored in a season by one team: 372 by St. Louis Cardinals
- Baseball Writers' Association of America (BBWAA) founded

== Boxing ==
Events

- 4 July — Battling Nelson recovers his World Lightweight Championship from Joe Gans with a 17th-round knockout at Colma, California
- World Middleweight Champion Stanley Ketchel loses his title on 7 September to Billy Papke by a 12th-round technical knockout at Vernon, California, but regains it on 26 November at Colma, California, where he knocks out Papke in the 11th round
- October – Mike "Twin" Sullivan vacates the World Welterweight Championship which remains unresolved until 1914
- 26 December — Jack Johnson becomes the first African American World Heavyweight Champion by defeating Tommy Burns at Sydney, Australia. Johnson holds the title until 1915.

Lineal world champions

- World Heavyweight Championship – Tommy Burns → Jack Johnson
- World Light Heavyweight Championship – vacant
- World Middleweight Championship – Stanley Ketchel → Billy Papke → Stanley Ketchel
- World Welterweight Championship – Mike "Twin" Sullivan → vacant
- World Lightweight Championship – Joe Gans → Battling Nelson
- World Featherweight Championship – Abe Attell
- World Bantamweight Championship – Jimmy Walsh

== Canadian Football ==
- Goals during play are reduced to 3 points
- Interprovincial Rugby Football Union - Hamilton Tigers
- Ontario Rugby Football Union - Toronto Athletic Club
- Manitoba Rugby Football Union - St John's
- Intercollegiate Rugby Football Union - University of Toronto
- Saskatchewan Rugby Football Union - Regina YMCA
- Edmonton defeats Calgary to win the Alberta Rugby Football League
- Dominion Championship - Hamilton defeats Toronto Varsity 21-17

== Cricket ==
England

- County Championship – Yorkshire
- Minor Counties Championship – Staffordshire
- Most runs – Tom Hayward 2337 @ 45.82 (HS 175)
- Most wickets – Colin Blythe 197 @ 16.88 (BB 8–83)
- Wisden Cricketers of the Year – Walter Brearley, Lord Hawke, Jack Hobbs, Alan Marshal, John Newstead

Australia

- Sheffield Shield – Victoria
- Most runs – Joe Hardstaff senior 1360 @ 52.30 (HS 135)
- Most wickets – Jack Saunders and Jack Crawford 66 apiece

India

- Bombay Triangular – Parsees

New Zealand

- Plunket Shield – Auckland

South Africa

- Currie Cup – Western Province

West Indies

- Inter-Colonial Tournament – not contested

== Cycling ==
Tour de France

- Lucien Petit-Breton (France) wins the 6th Tour de France

== Field hockey ==
Olympic Games (Men's Competition)

- Gold Medal – England
- Silver Medal – Ireland
- Bronze Medals – Scotland & Wales

== Figure skating ==
Events

- Inaugural International Skating Union (ISU) Championships for pair skating is held at Saint Petersburg
- Figure skating is held at the 1908 Summer Olympics and is the first winter sport to feature at the Olympics — 16 years before the inaugural Winter Games is held

World Figure Skating Championships

- World Men's Champion – Ulrich Salchow (Sweden)
- World Women's Champion – Lily Kronberger (Hungary)
- World Pairs Champions – Anna Hübler and Heinrich Burger (Germany)

1908 Summer Olympics

- Men's individual – Ulrich Salchow (Sweden)
- Men's special figures – Nikolai Panin (Russia)
- Women's individual – Madge Syers (Great Britain)
- Pairs – Anna Hübler and Heinrich Burger (Germany)

== Golf ==
Major tournaments

- British Open – James Braid
- US Open – Fred McLeod

Other tournaments

- British Amateur – Edward Lassen
- US Amateur – Jerome Travers

== Horse racing ==
England

- Grand National – Rubio
- 1,000 Guineas Stakes – Rhodora
- 2,000 Guineas Stakes – Norman
- The Derby – Signorinetta
- The Oaks – Signorinetta
- St. Leger Stakes – Your Majesty

Australia

- Melbourne Cup – Lord Nolan

Canada

- King's Plate – Seismic

Ireland

- Irish Grand National – Lord Rivers
- Irish Derby Stakes – Wild Bouquet

USA

- Kentucky Derby – Stone Street
- Preakness Stakes – Royal Tourist
- Belmont Stakes – Colin

== Ice hockey ==
Events

- January 2 — The first All-Star game in ice hockey history is held at Montreal to benefit the widow of Hod Stuart, killed in an off-season swimming accident.

Stanley Cup

- January 9–13 – Montreal Wanderers defeat the Ottawa Victorias 9–3, 13–1 (22–4) in a two-game challenge to retain the Stanley Cup.
- March 7 — Montreal Wanderers win the Eastern Canada Amateur Hockey Association (ECAHA) championship for the third year in a row and successfully defend the Stanley Cup.
- March 10–12 – Montreal Wanderers defeat Winnipeg Maple Leafs 11–5, 9–3 (20–8) in a two-game challenge.
- March 14 – Montreal Wanderers defeat Toronto Professionals 6–4 in a one-game challenge to retain the Stanley Cup.

== Lacrosse ==
Events

- Lacrosse is played as an Olympic sport for the second and last time (the first having been in 1904). Canada defeats Great Britain: they are the only two teams to compete.

== Olympic Games ==
1908 Summer Olympics

- The 1908 Summer Olympics takes place in London
- Great Britain wins the most medals (145) and the most gold medals (56)

== Rowing ==
The Boat Race

- 4 April — Cambridge wins the 65th Oxford and Cambridge Boat Race

== Rugby league ==
- 1907–08 New Zealand rugby tour of Australia and Great Britain

Events

- Hunslet becomes the first team to achieve the celebrated "All Four Cups" feat

England

- Championship – Hunslet
- Challenge Cup final – Hunslet 14–0 Hull F.C. at Fartown Ground, Huddersfield
- Lancashire League Championship – Oldham
- Yorkshire League Championship – Hunslet
- Lancashire County Cup – Oldham 16–9 Broughton Rangers
- Yorkshire County Cup – Hunslet 17–0 Halifax

Australia

- Professional rugby league begins in Australia with the formation of the New South Wales Rugby League
- South Sydney wins the first Australian championship, defeating Eastern Suburbs 14–12 in the final
- First Australian national rugby league team embarks on the inaugural 1908–09 Kangaroo tour of Great Britain

== Rugby union ==
Home Nations Championship

- 26th Home Nations Championship series is won by Wales
- As Wales also defeats France in a 1908 non-championship match, its team is retrospectively regarded as a Grand Slam winner

== Speed skating ==
Speed Skating World Championships

- Men's All-round Champion – Oscar Mathisen (Norway)

== Tennis ==
Australia

- Australian Men's Singles Championship – Fred Alexander (USA) defeats Alfred Dunlop (Australia) 3–6 3–6 6–0 6–2 6–3

England

- Wimbledon Men's Singles Championship – Arthur Gore (GB) defeats Herbert Barrett (GB) 6–3 6–2 4–6 3–6 6–4
- Wimbledon Women's Singles Championship – Charlotte Cooper Sterry (GB) defeats Agnes Morton (GB) 6–4 6–4

France

- French Men's Singles Championship – Max Decugis (France) defeats Maurice Germot (France): details unknown
- French Women's Singles Championship – Kate Gillou-Fenwick (France) defeats Pean (France): details unknown

USA

- American Men's Singles Championship – William Larned (USA) defeats Beals Wright (USA) 6–1 6–2 8–6
- American Women's Singles Championship – Maud Barger-Wallach (USA) defeats Evelyn Sears (USA) 6–3 1–6 6–3

Davis Cup

- 1908 International Lawn Tennis Challenge – Australasia 3–2 United States at Albert Ground (grass) Melbourne, Australia
