= Geoffrey Hall-Say =

British figure skater

Personal information
- Full name: Geoffrey Norman Edward Hall-Say
- Born: 27 April 1864
- Died: 21 January 1940 (aged 75)

Figure skating career
- Country: Great Britain
Medal record
Men's figure skating
Representing Great Britain
Olympic Games
Bronze medal – third place	1908 London	Special figures

Geoffrey Norman Edward Hall-Say (27 April 1864 – 21 January 1940) was a British figure skater. He won the bronze medal in the special figures event at the 1908 Summer Olympics and became one of the oldest figure skating Olympic medalists. This was the only year in which special figures was an Olympic event. Fellow Brit Arthur Cumming won the silver.

== Sources ==
- British medal winners, 1908 Olympics
- Geoffrey Hall-Say at databaseOlympics.com
