= Figure skating at the Olympic Games =

- IOC Code: FSK
- Governing body: ISU
- Events: 5 (men: 1; women: 1; mixed: 3)

Summer Olympics
- 1908; 1920

Winter Olympics
- 1924; 1928; 1932; 1936; 1948; 1952; 1956; 1960; 1964; 1968; 1972; 1976; 1980; 1984; 1988; 1992; 1994; 1998; 2002; 2006; 2010; 2014; 2018; 2022; 2026
- Medalists

Figure skating was first contested at the Olympic Games at the 1908 Summer Olympics in London, England. Since 1924, the sport has been a part of the Winter Olympic Games. The disciplines of men's singles, women's singles, and pair skating have been contested since the 1908 Olympics. Ice dance joined as a medal sport in 1976 and a team event debuted at the 2014 Winter Olympics. Special figures were only contested at the 1908 Olympics.

The Winter Games have been televised since the 1936 Olympics in Berlin. The ISU Judging System has been used since 2004, following a judging scandal during the pair skating event at the 2002 Winter Olympics in Salt Lake City, Utah. In 2022, during the Beijing Winter Games, a doping scandal prompted the International Skating Union (ISU), the organization that oversees figure skating, to raise the age limit for participation in the Olympics.

The ISU and the International Olympic Committee work together to determine the qualifying criteria for figure skaters who compete at the Winter Olympics. The ISU states the following: "All athletes must respect and comply with the provisions of the Olympic Charter currently in force". The ISU Judging System is used to determine the placement of competitors and medal winners.

== History ==
=== Early history ===
Figure skating was first contested as an Olympic sport at the 1908 Summer Olympics, in London, England, with four disciplines: men, ladies, (Note: "Women" were referred to as "ladies" in ISU regulations and communications until the 2021–22 season.) pair skating, and special figures. According to figure skating historian James R. Hines, the inclusion of figure skating as an Olympic sport was due to the efforts and influence of the British figure skating community and the availability of indoor artificial ice in England. Hines also states that "Olympic skating began in part because of a natural disaster". The 1908 Games, the fourth modern Olympics, were originally to be held in Rome, but the eruption of Mount Vesuvius in 1906 and Italy's rebuilding efforts prohibited it from hosting the Olympics. William Grenfell, the British member of the International Olympic Committee (IOC), was approached with an offer to host the Olympics in England. H. E. Vandervell, who was called "the father of British figure skating", was also involved in the proposal to include figure skating at the London Olympics. The British Olympic Association, after consulting with and receiving positive responses from the governing bodies of several sports in England, accepted the invitation and was appointed to plan and manage the Games. A month after the appointment, they discussed the possibility of including figure skating and indoor speed skating (now called short track), but only figure skating was included. Special figures were also included for the only time in Olympic history.

Hines considers the inclusion of pair skating in both the 1908 World Championships and 1908 Olympic Games "surprising", adding, "The rapidly increasing number of talented women skaters who wanted to compete must have had a direct influence and thus offers the best explanation of both ladies' and pairs competitions at about the same time". Scholar Ellyn Kestnbaum called figure skating "one of the first organized sports to include female participants on a nominally equal footing with males and one of the first to offer women the opportunity to participate in the Olympics". Kat Eschner of Smithsonian Magazine, in her discussion of women's participation in figure skating, states that "figure skating is the oldest women's Olympic sport. It was one of the first sports with a category for women competitors and the only women's winter Olympic sport until 1936".

Ulrich Salchow of Sweden and Madge Syers of Great Britain were the first Olympic champions in men's and women's single skating, respectively. The first Olympic champions in pair skating were Anna Hübler and Heinrich Burger of Germany. The first and only Olympic champion in special figures was Nikolai Panin of Russia.

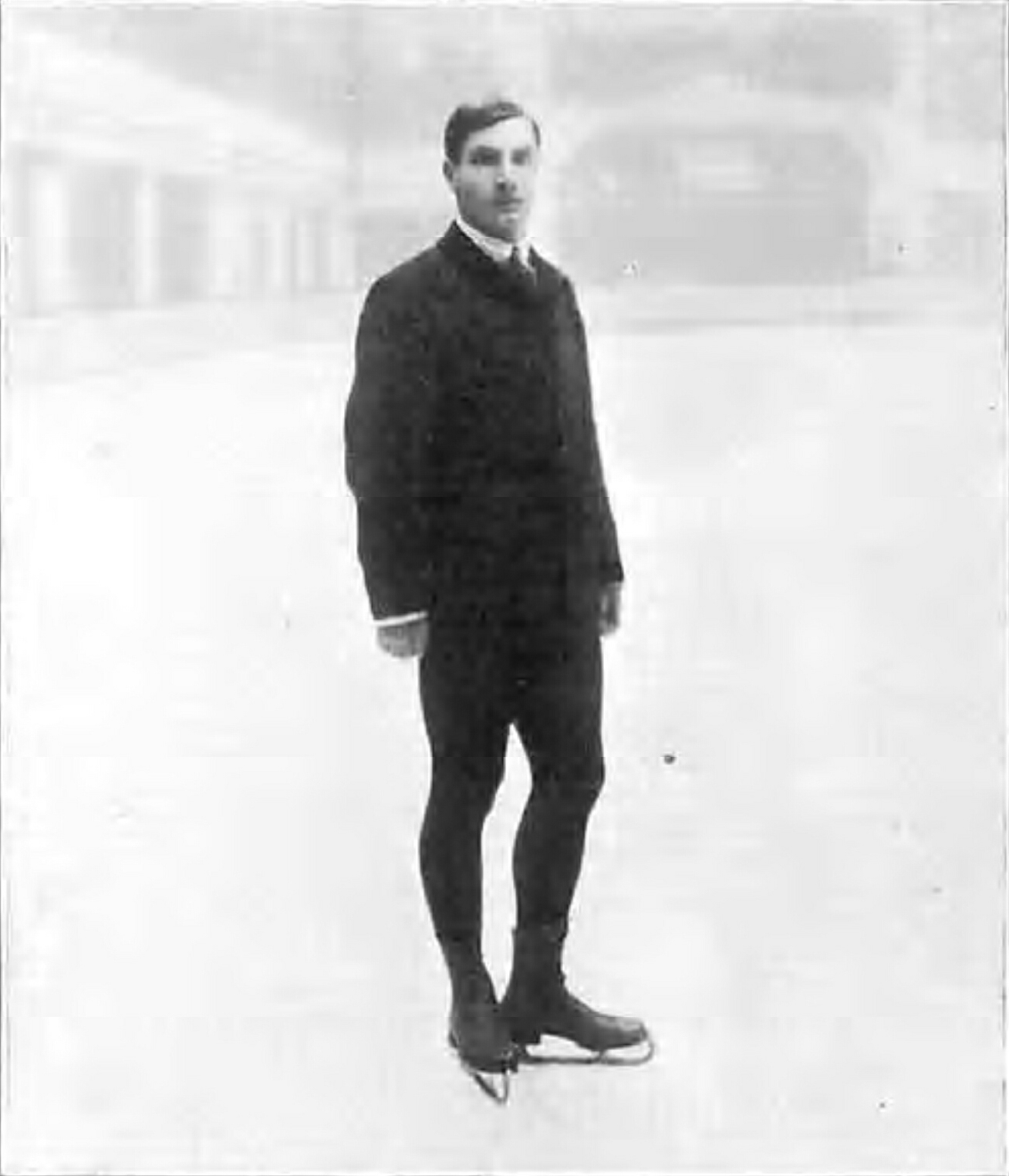
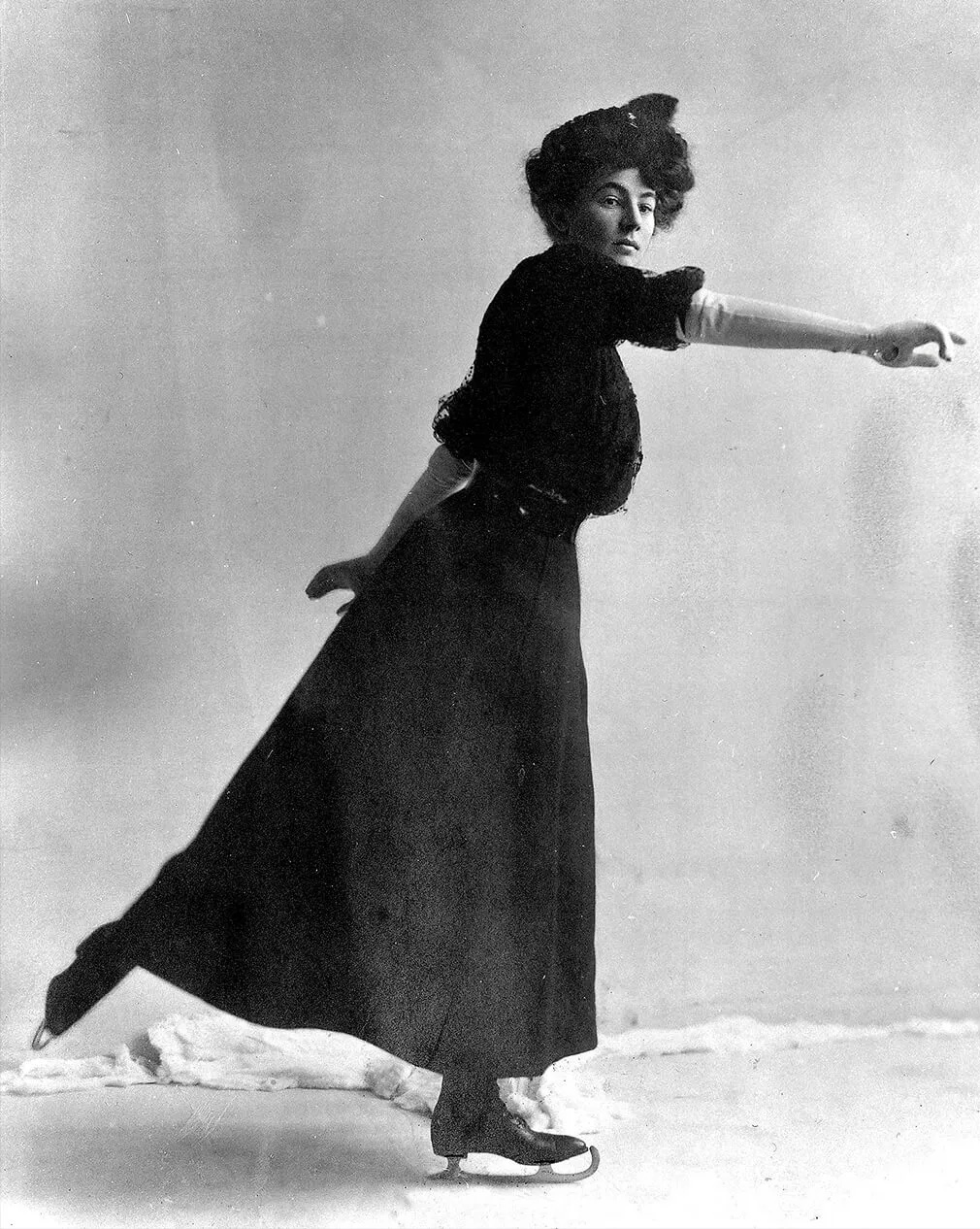
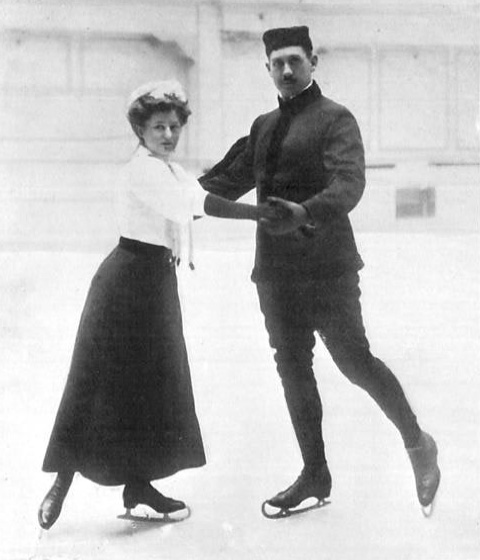
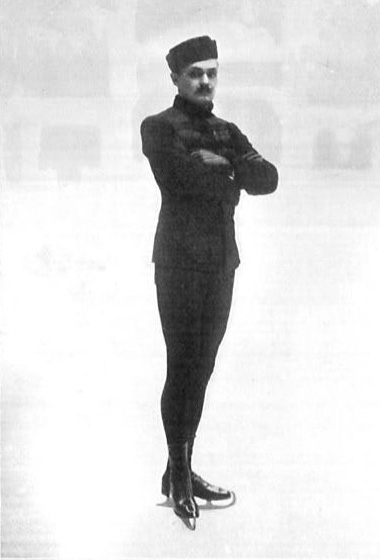
The first Olympic champions in figure skating: Ulrich Salchow of Sweden (men's singles); Madge Syers of Great Britain (women's singles); Anna Hübler and Heinrich Burger of Germany (pair skating); and Nikolai Panin of Russia (special figures).

Figure skating was not included in the 1912 Games in Stockholm, probably due to a lack of ice, and the 1916 Olympics, which were supposed to be held in Berlin, was cancelled because of World War I. The 1920 Games in Antwerp, the first Olympics after World War I, included figure skating, but the International Skating Union (ISU), the organization that oversees figure skating, chose not to "participate in either the planning or the conduct of the games", as a protest against including defeated nations. The ISU, however, did not try to prevent athletes from competing. The Antwerp Figure Skating Club oversaw figure skating events at the Olympics instead of the ISU, and ISU rules were followed. It was the last time figure skating was contested before the Winter Games were held separately. Special figures were not included at Antwerp.

The 1924 Paris Olympic Games were the first to separate the Summer Games and the Winter Games, which were held at Chamonix in southeastern France. In 1925, the IOC voted to rename the Chamonix events the Winter Olympic Games. Separate Winter Games have been held every four years, except in 1940 and 1944, when they were cancelled due to World War II. Participation in figure skating at the Olympics increased between the World Wars, from 23 in 1920 to 42 in 1936. The champions at the five Winter Games during this period were "some of the finest skaters in the history of the sport": Gillis Grafstrom of Sweden, who won three times; Sonja Henie of Norway, who won three times; Karl Schäfer of Austria, who won twice; and pair skaters Andrée Brunet and Pierre Brunet of France, who won twice.

=== Later years ===
According to Hines, "Like gymnastics in the Olympic Summer Games, figure skating in the Olympic Winter Games is the most popular sport for television audiences". The 1936 Olympics in Berlin were the first Games to be broadcast on television, though only to local audiences. The 1956 Winter Olympics in Cortina d'Ampezzo, Italy, were the first internationally televised Olympic Games, as well as the last time figure skating was contested outdoors. The 1960 Squaw Valley Winter Games were the first to have all figure skating events televised. In 1967, the ISU voted to hold the World Figure Skating Championships, European Figure Skating Championships, and the Olympic Winter Games indoors on covered ice rinks.

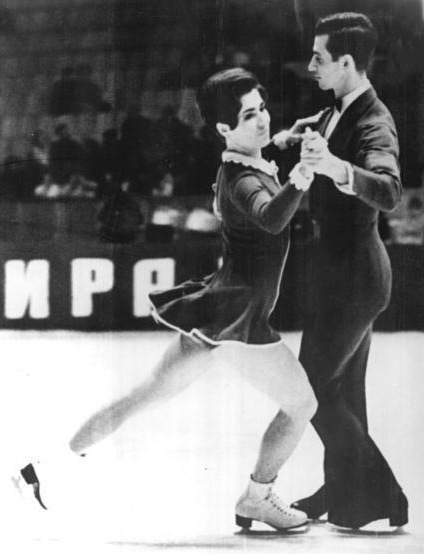
Lyudmilla Pachomowa and Alexandr Gorshkov (1979) of the Soviet Union, the first Olympic gold medalists in Ice dance

Ice dance was added as an Olympic discipline in 1976; Lyudmila Pakhomova and Alexandr Gorshkov from the Soviet Union were the first gold medalists. Synchronized skating has never been a part of the Olympics, although there has been discussion regarding its inclusion. The Summer and Winter Games were held in the same year until 1992, when the IOC decided to alternate the Summer and Winter Games in a two-year rotation; the Winter Games were moved forward by two years, so the 1994 Winter Games were held in Lillehammer, Norway. In 1992, the ISU also chose to permit "a one-time reinstatement of ineligible skaters to full eligibility", which meant that professional skaters could compete at the European Championships, World Championships, and the Olympics in 1994. The 1992 Winter Games were the first Olympics where compulsory figures were not included, after the ISU chose to remove them from competition in 1990.

The women's figure skating competition drew media attention in 1994 in the aftermath of the assault of Nancy Kerrigan, planned by the ex-husband of opponent Tonya Harding in January 1994, during the U.S. Figure Skating Championships. Both skaters competed at the Olympics; Kerrigan narrowly came in second place, behind Oksana Baiul of Ukraine, and Harding finished in eighth place. The 1998 Winter Olympics in Nagano, Japan, was the first time the Summer and Olympics were held in different cities.

At the 2002 Winter Olympics in Salt Lake City, Utah, a judging scandal led to the change of the scoring system in figure skating, from the 6.0 System, developed in the early days of the sport, to the ISU Judging System. Kestnbaum states, "After the scandal at the 2002 Olympics, when the admission by the French judge in the pairs competition that she had been pressured by the French federation president to favor the top Russian team over the Canadian co-favorites provided confirmation of judging improprieties in front of a worldwide audience, the ISU took drastic action". The first time the new scoring system was used at the Olympics was at the 2006 Turin Winter Games.

The 2014 Sochi Games were the first time the team event was contested at the Olympics. Ten nations, each featuring a male and female single skater, a pair skating team, and an ice dance team, competed over three days. The five teams with the highest scores in the short program or rhythm dance went on to compete in the free skate or free dance programs. The change in ice dance from three components to two in 2010, when the ISU voted to eliminate the compulsory dance and the original dance, and replace them with the short dance, "opened the way for the team event to be introduced in the Olympic programme". The Russian team was the first team to win gold in the team event. In 2022, during the Beijing Winter Games, a doping scandal prompted the ISU to raise the age limit for participation in the Olympics.

There have been several notable Olympic skaters in the post-WWII era and the 21st century. Dick Button from the United States, who executed the first double Axel jump at the Olympics in 1948, where he earned a gold medal at age 16, and the first triple jump (the loop jump) in competition at the 1952 Olympics, went on to be a figure skating commentator for 40 years. American skater Peggy Fleming, who won a gold medal at the 1968 Olympics, signaled a return to American success in the sport of women's figure skating following the 1961 Sabena plane crash that killed the entire U.S. figure skating team, was also a commentator after her retirement from competitive skating, alongside Button. Pairs skaters Ludmila Belousova and Oleg Protopopov were the first Soviet skaters to win gold medals in pair skating from the Soviet Union at the 1964 Games; Russian pair skaters won gold medals in all twelve Olympics between 1964 and 2006. The Soviets also dominated in ice dance during most of the 1970s, winning every Worlds and Olympics between 1970 and 1978. At the 1984 Winter Games in Sarajevo, Soviet domination of ice dancing was broken Jayne Torvill and Christopher Dean from Great Britain; their free dance to Ravel's Boléro has been called "probably the most well known single program in the history of ice dance". In 1998, American skater Tara Lipinski, who, like Button and Fleming, went on to become a commentator, alongside her friend and fellow Olympian Johnny Weir, became the youngest Olympic gold medalist in figure skating history at age 15. She was the sixth American woman to win an Olympic gold medal in figure skating. She broke the record set by Sonia Henie at the 1928 Winter Olympics, which had stood for 70 years. In 2018, at the Olympics in Pyeongchang, Canadian ice dancers Tessa Virtue and Scott Moir became the most decorated figure skaters in Olympic history after winning the gold medal there, winning three Olympic gold medals and two silver medals at the Olympics.

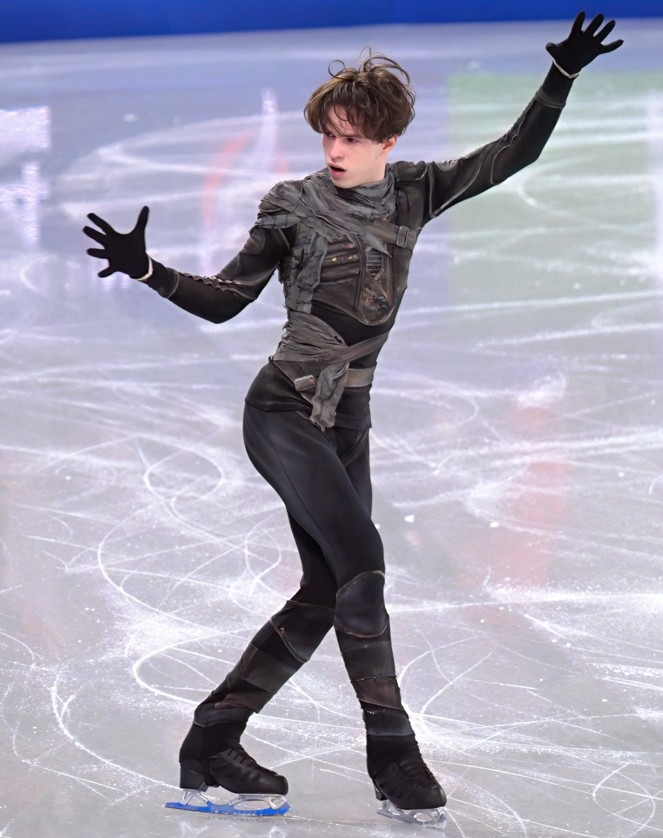
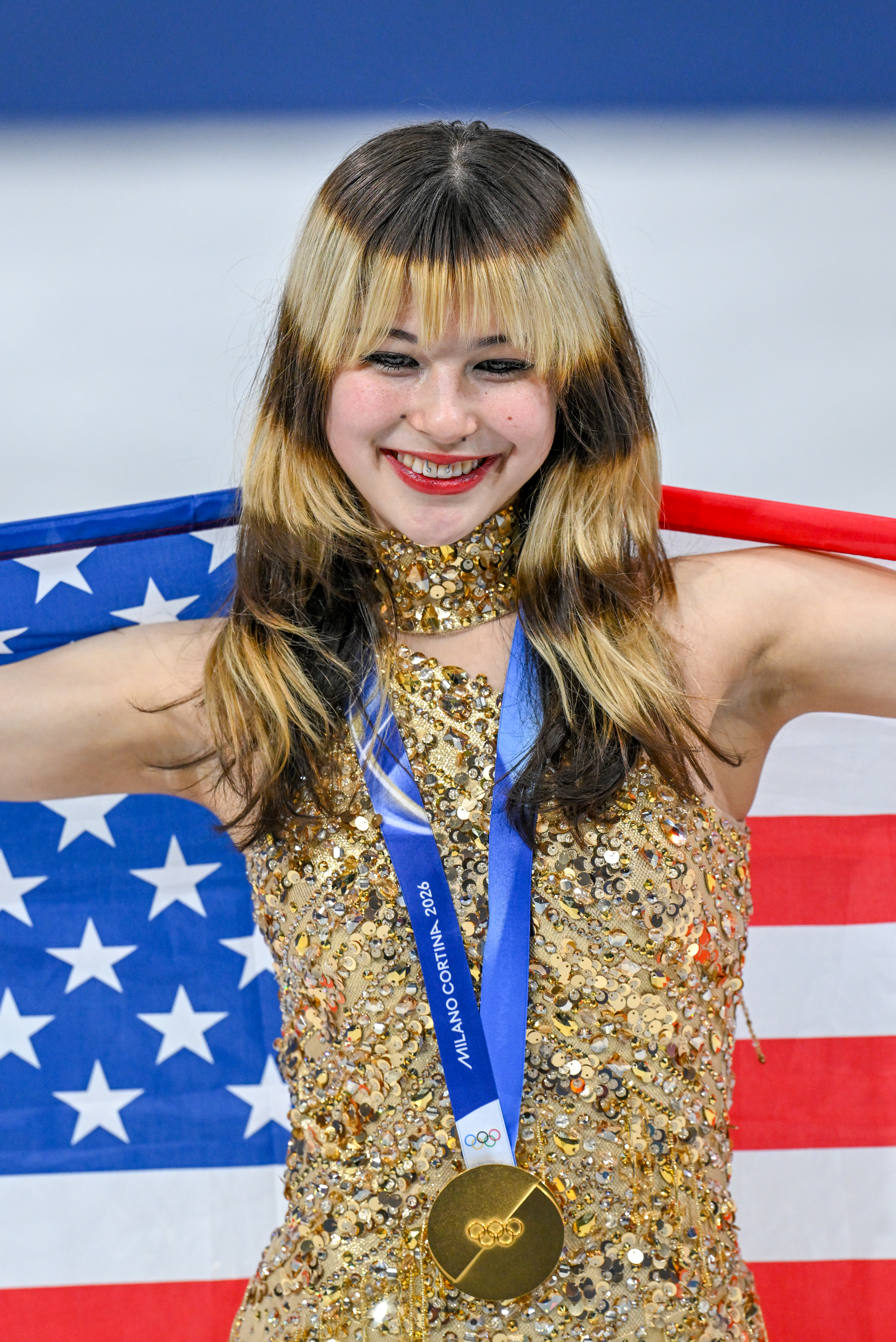
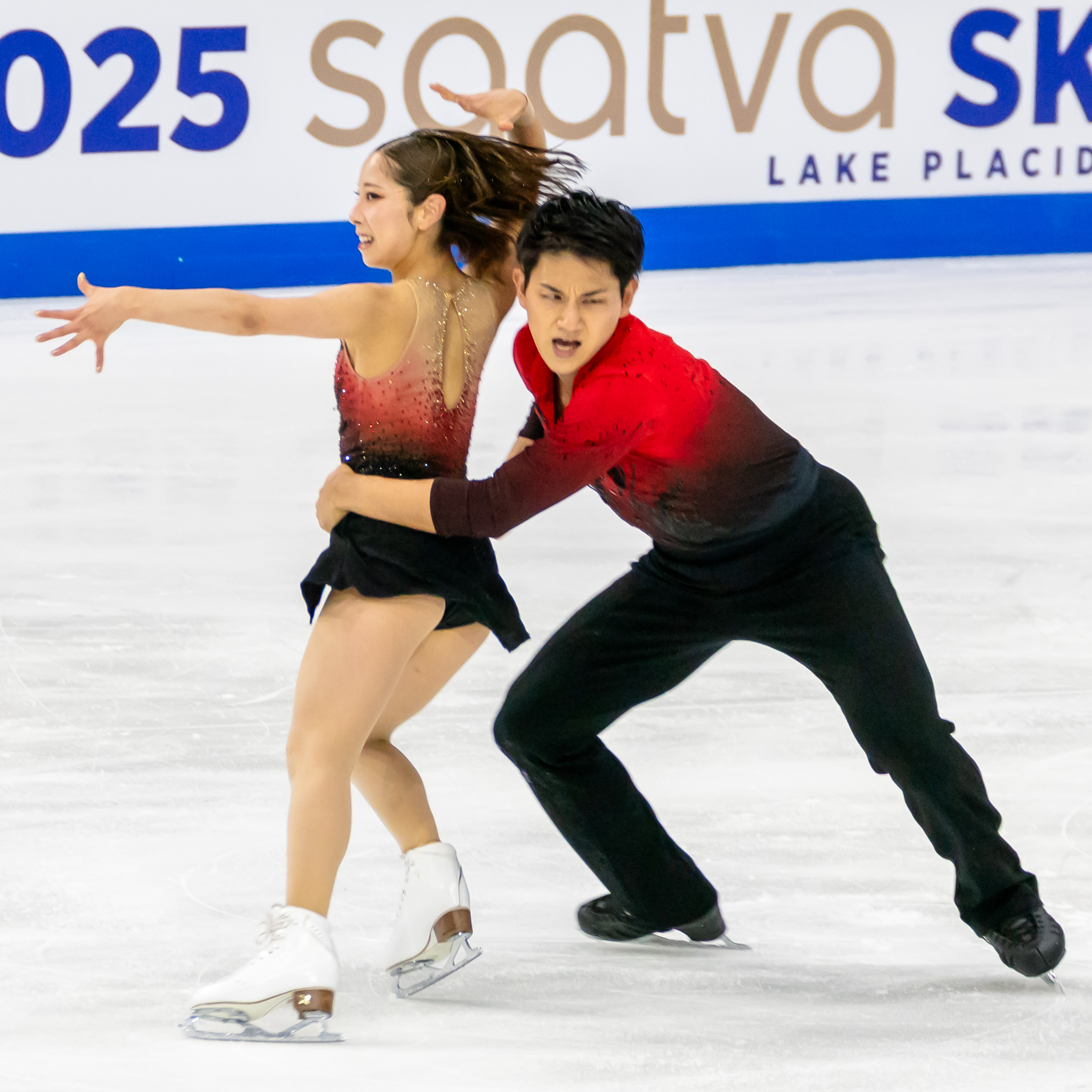
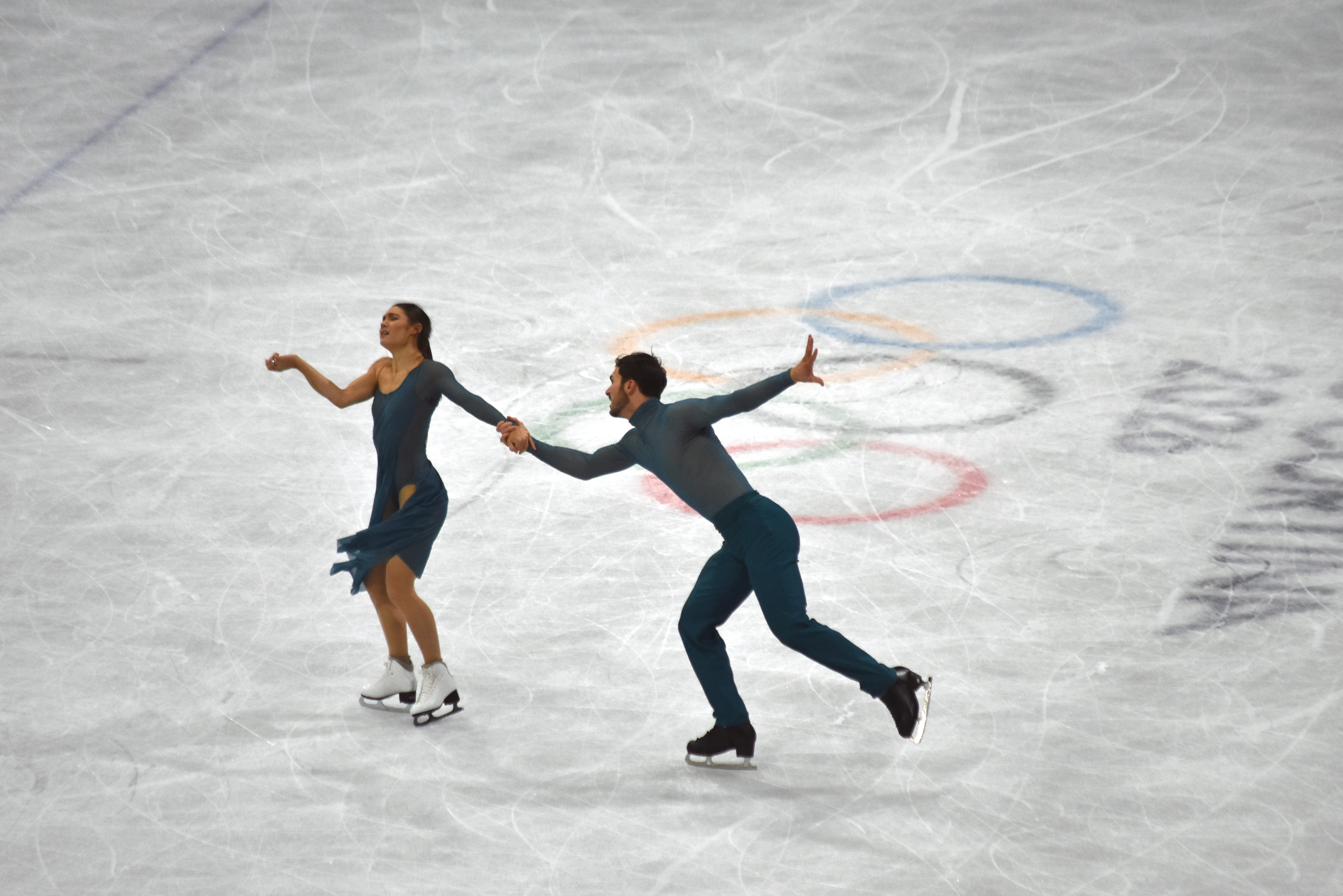
The reigning Olympic figure skating champions: Mikhail Shaidorov of Kazakhstan (men's singles); Alysa Liu of the United States (women's singles); Riku Miura and Ryuichi Kihara of Japan (pair skating); and Laurence Fournier Beaudry and Guillaume Cizeron of France (ice dance)

== Qualifying ==
There are five figure skating events at the Winter Olympics: one men's event (men's single skating), one women's event (women's single skating), and three mixed events, which consist of pair skating, ice dance, and the team event. Athletes are sent to the Olympics by their individual National Olympic Committees (NOCs), which "promote the development of their respective national athletes and select which ones will attend the Olympic Games" and nominate host cities selected by the IOC.

The ISU states the following: "All athletes must respect and comply with the provisions of the Olympic Charter currently in force". These provisions include, but are not limited to:

- Rule 40-41 of the Olympic charter, which states that "any competitor in the Olympic Games must be a national of the country of the NOC which is entering such competitor".
- Rule 43 of the Olympic charter, which prohibits doping, "the use of prohibited substances to enhance performance".
- The Olympic Movement Code on the Prevention of Manipulation of Competitions, which prohibits "an intentional arrangement, act or omission aimed at an improper alteration of the result or the course of a sports competition" for the purpose of "obtaining an undue benefit for oneself or for others".

The maximum number of competitors for the Winter Games across all disciplines, for the short program and the rhythm dance to qualify for the free skate and free dance, must be determined before each Winter Games and must be in accordance with the qualification system. The IOC decides the qualification system in consultation with the ISU and publishes the qualification points and qualification timeline before the Winter Games. (Note: See "Qualification System - XXV Olympic Winter Games - Milano Cortina 2026: Figure Skating", pp. 1-2, for a more detailed explanation of the quota spaces for skaters and couples.) The IOC also publishes the confirmation and entry procedure for the Olympics before the Olympics.

For the 2026 Winter Games, there are 24 entries for the women's and men's singles competition, 16 entries for pair skaters, and 19 entries for ice dance. ISU-member countries with skaters who have earned the necessary points have the right to two or three entries into the Winter Games if they also had two or three entries in the World Championships immediately before the Winter Games.

The remaining open entries are filled by ISU-member countries in the order of their placements at a senior international competition designated by the ISU that took place in the autumn of the calendar year immediately before the Winter Games. The entries are available only to ISU-member countries that have earned one entry and have earned enough points for two or three entries, but did not have two or three skaters who qualified for the free skate or free dance at the World Championships immediately before the Olympic Games.

Skaters of ISU-member countries who have participated in the World senior championships that have taken place the year before the Winter Games are eligible to accumulate points to qualify to compete at the Olympics. Skaters, pair teams, and ice dance couples are eligible to enter and participate in the Olympics only if they have reached the applicable combined total elements score, as established for the European Championships or Four Continents Championships. The scores must be earned in an ISU-recognized international competition held in the same season as the Games or in the immediately preceding season. However, the ISU-member country that is hosting the Games has the right to enter one competitor "per concerned discipline(s) as additional entry(ies)" only if the "concerned Skater(s)/Pair/Couple" have earned the minimum total elements score for the Winter Games. Skaters participating in the Olympics through the host country's allocated quota can compete only in individual events, not in the team event. The host country can choose not to send competitors to the figure skating events at the Olympics; for example, in 1994, Norway sent no skaters to Lillehammer, despite being the host country.

ISU-member countries with skaters who have earned entries must, if possible, inform the ISU how many skaters and teams are eligible to compete at the Olympics after the senior World Championships and the qualifying competition, whichever applies, but before a specified date. The unfilled entries will be filled by eligible member countries. The ISU publishes a list of the "set and stand-by entries" before a specified date, but after the senior World Championships and qualifying competitions for the Olympics, whichever applies. The ISU confirms in writing the quota places allotted to each NOC, and the NOCs have two weeks to accept them.

=== Team event ===
If the IOC includes, in the program of the Olympics, in addition to the existing number of events, a team event with single skaters, pair skaters, and ice dancers, the ISU, in consultation with the IOC, will set all relevant conditions for the event. These conditions include: the number of teams and participants; qualifying, participation, and entry criteria; technical format; starting order; result determination; officials' participation; and other "relevant technical and organizational details".

The team event format consists of up to ten best national teams from the NOCs. Each team consists of one skater from the men's single skating event, one skater from the women's single skating event, one pair skating team, and one ice dance couple, for a total of six skaters per team. According to the ISU, "Only athletes that are already qualified for the individual events...are eligible to participate in the Team Event" at the Olympics. Each team must participate in at least three disciplines of the team event. If an NOC has two or three entries in an individual Olympic competition or discipline, the NOC must confirm the names of the participants who will compete in the short program and rhythm dance of the team event.

=== Switching nationalities ===
If a competitor is a national of two or more countries at the same time, they can represent either country. If they compete for one country in the Olympics, in regional games, or in world or regional championships, however, they cannot represent another country, unless there are "certain circumstances". These circumstances can include the passage of at least three years since the skater last represented their former home country, which the IOC can reduce or waive with the agreement of the relevant NOC. For example, pair skater Deanna Stellato-Dudek changed her citizenship from American to Canadian in 2024 and, as of September 2026, is the oldest skater to compete at the 2026 Winter Games.

When China won the bid to host the 2022 Winter Games in 2015, an open invitation was issued to non-citizen Chinese athletes in other countries to participate in Olympic sports for China, as long as they were willing to change their citizenship. One figure skater, Zhu Yi, who was originally from the U.S., was selected to represent China. As of 2022, in response to Russia's invasion of Ukraine, Russian and Belarusian athletes have been banned from all international competitions. According to NBC Sports, they can compete as neutral athletes at the 2026 Winter Games if they did not support the invasion. For example, six skaters who competed at the 2025 World Figure Skating Championships had previously represented Russia but switched nationalities after the ban. As of March 2025, the ISU maintained its condemnation of the invasion of Ukraine.

In September 2025, in advance of the 2026 Winter Games, the IOC approved thirteen nationality changes, none of which were figure skaters.

=== Age limit ===
As of the 2026 Milano Cortina Winter Games, "athletes must be born on or before July 1, 2008".

In 2022, the ISU voted to gradually raise the minimum age from 15 to 17 over the next three years. They characterized the decision "as an effort to safeguard 'the physical and mental health, and emotional well-being' of skaters". The decision came in the aftermath of worldwide criticism for the doping scandal involving Russian skater Kamila Valieva during the Beijing Winter Olympics, who was 15 years old at the time. The scandal, according to The New York Times, "once again raised questions about the physical and mental safety of young skaters and whether enough was being done to protect them from the adults guiding their careers".

The proposal to raise the age limit had broad support in the international figure skating community, where the issue had been discussed and debated for many years, though some opposed the disruption it would cause to the sport. Tatiana Tarasova, a top figure skating coach in Russia, stated that the rule change was made to "specifically target the Russian team", implying it is designed to deprive Russia of medals. ISU president Jan Dijkema said that it was an important and historic decision.

=== Doping controversies ===
The ISU follows the prohibition of doping as described in the Olympic charter. Although figure skaters have had positive doping results, and bans can be enforced on figure skaters by the ISU and by each country, it is not common.

After the 2014 Winter Olympics in Sochi, the International Olympic Committee began disciplinary proceedings against 28 Russian athletes, acting on evidence that their urine samples were tampered with. In late 2019, in response to its state-sponsored doping scheme, the World Anti-Doping Agency (WADA) banned Russia from all international sports for four years. Russia filed an appeal, and the Court of Arbitration for Sport (CAS), instead of banning Russia from sporting events, ruled to allow Russian athletes to participate at the Olympics and other international events. For two Olympics and for any World Championships during the following two years, however, the team had to compete as neutral athletes. In early 2021, it was announced that Russia would compete under the name of the Russian Olympic Committee (ROC), that the Russian national flag would be replaced with the ROC's flag, and that athletes could only wear team uniforms with the acronym "ROC." These decisions affected two Winter Olympics: the 2018 Pyeonchang Olympics and the 2022 Beijing Olympics.

A doping scandal during the Beijing Games prompted the ISU to raise the age limit for participation in the Olympics. Russian single skater Kamila Valieva had tested positive for trimetazidine earlier in the year, but was eventually cleared to compete in the Olympics. As part of the ROC team, Valieva won a gold medal in the team event but was disqualified four years retroactively for an anti-doping violation, resulting in the U.S. team being upgraded to gold, Japan to silver, and the ROC being downgraded to bronze.

== Judging ==
As of the 2025–26 season, all of the technical elements in any figure skating performance – such as jumps and spins – are assigned a predetermined base point value and are then scored by a panel of seven or nine judges on a scale from -5 to 5 based on their quality of execution. The judging panel's Grade of Execution (GOE) is determined by calculating the trimmed mean (that is, the average after deleting the highest and lowest scores), and this GOE is added to the base value to come up with the final score for each element. The panel's scores for all elements are added together to generate a total elements score. At the same time, judges evaluate each performance based on three program components – skating skills, presentation, and composition – and assign a score from .25 to 10 in .25 point increments. The judging panel's final score for each program component is also determined by calculating the trimmed mean. Those scores are then multiplied by the factor shown on the following chart; the results are added together to generate a total program component score.

Program component factoring
Discipline	Short program or Rhythm dance	Free skate or Free dance
Men	1.67	3.33
Women	1.33	2.67
Pairs	1.33	2.67
Ice dance	1.33	2.00

Deductions are applied for certain violations like time infractions, stops and restarts, or falls. The total elements score and total program component score are added together, minus any deductions, to generate a final performance score for each skater or team.

== Events ==
- The chart below shows when each event occurred at every Winter Games.

Event	'08	'20	'24	'28	'32	'36	'48	'52	'56	'60	'64	'68	'72	'76	'80	'84	'88	'92	'94	'98	'02	'06	'10	'14	'18	'22	'26
Men's singles	●	●	●	●	●	●	●	●	●	●	●	●	●	●	●	●	●	●	●	●	●	●	●	●	●	●	●
Men's special figures	●																										
Women's singles	●	●	●	●	●	●	●	●	●	●	●	●	●	●	●	●	●	●	●	●	●	●	●	●	●	●	●
Pair skating	●	●	●	●	●	●	●	●	●	●	●	●	●	●	●	●	●	●	●	●	●	●	●	●	●	●	●
Ice dance														●	●	●	●	●	●	●	●	●	●	●	●	●	●
Team event																								●	●	●	●
Ref.																											
Total events	4	3	3	3	3	3	3	3	3	3	3	3	3	4	4	4	4	4	4	4	4	4	4	5	5	5	5

== Participating nations ==
The number in each box represents the number of figure skaters sent by each nation.

Number of participants in figure skating per country
Nation	'08	'20	'24	'28	'32	'36	'48	'52	'56	'60	'64	'68	'72	'76	'80	'84	'88	'92	'94	'98	'02	'06	'10	'14	'18	'22	'26
Argentina	1																										
Armenia																				4	3	2				2	2
Australia								3	2	6				2	2	2	4	3	2	4	2	1	1	4	4	2	4
Austria			4	9	2	12	10	4	8	6	10	8	3	6	3		2	1		1		1	2	4	2	3	1
Azerbaijan																				4	3	2		2		2	1
Belarus																			5	2	2	1				2	
Belgium		2	3	2	1	4	3									1	1				1	1	2	1	2	1	2
Brazil																								1	1		
Bulgaria																2	2	1	1	4	3	5				1	1
Canada			2	5	6	6	4	6	7	8	12	10	7	11	6	15	17	13	13	10	12	13	12	17	17	13	12
China															2	6	6	4	4	4	11	9	9	9	11	8	6
Chinese Taipei																	2	1		1							1
Croatia																		2		1	1	1					
Czechoslovakia			1	3	1	3	7		4	2	8	8	1	6	2	3	6	6									
Czech Republic																			8	5	4	1	4	3	5	6	4
Denmark							1	1									1	2	1	1							
East Germany												8	7	10	7	8	5										
Estonia						2												1	1	1	1	3	5	2		2	2
Finland		3	2	3	1	1		2	1					1	2			3	3	1	1	2	3		1	3	3
France		2	5	3	2		3	2	3	4	5	5	5	1	1	5	6	12	9	14	8	8	8	9	8	4	9
Georgia																					1	2	3	1	1	6	6
Germany	3			8	1	6		8										6	10	6	4	5	8	10	8	6	6
United Team of Germany									4	11	12																
Great Britain	11	6	6	6	4	12	9	8	8	4	5	7	5	12	9	10	9	7	6	1	2	2	7	6	2	3	8
Hungary					4	7	6	6	2		2	2	1	3	2	2	3	5	3	2	2	5	3		1	2	2
Individual Neutral Athletes																											3
Israel																			1	3	4	4	2	3	7	3	1
Italy						2	2	1	2	2	2	2	1	7	2	3	4	7		6	9	7	9	11	11	9	9
Japan					2	5				3	4	5	4	3	3	4	5	6	4	7	4	6	8	10	9	10	12
Kazakhstan																			2	5			2	2	3		2
Latvia						4												2	3						2	1	2
Lithuania																		2	2	2	2	2		2		2	3
Luxembourg																				1		1					
Malaysia																									1		
Mexico																	2	2								1	1
Netherlands								1	2	2	1		1	1												1	2
North Korea																	2	6				4	1		2		
Norway		6	1	3	1	4	3	4			2													1			
Philippines																								1	1		
Poland												2	2	3		1	3	2	3	5	4	4	4		2	3	6
Romania						3						1	1					1	2	1	2	2	1	1			1
Russia	1																		15	17	16	16	16	15			
Olympic Athletes from Russia																									15		
ROC																										18	
Serbia and Montenegro																						1					
Slovakia																				1	3		1	1	3		1
Slovenia																		2		1	1	1	2				
South Africa										4									1	1							
South Korea												3	1	1	1	2	2	2	2	1	4		2	3	7	4	6
Spain									1						1		1		1	1			2	4	4	4	5
Sweden	4	4	1	1	2	1		2	1		1	1	1		1	2	2	1		1		1	1	2	1	2	3
Switzerland		1	1	2		3	7	5	4	3	8	1	1	3	2	2	2		1	1	4	3	4		1	2	3
Turkey																						1	1	2	2		
Soviet Union										4	4	10	10	16	16	17	17										
Ukraine																			10	10	11	11	7	6	4	6	1
Unified Team																		17									
United States	1	2	3	6	12	9	9	10	10	12	12	12	11	15	14	18	16	16	12	13	14	16	15	15	14	16	16
Uzbekistan																			4	2	4	3	1	1	1		
West Germany												11	5	4	7	9	8										
Yugoslavia															1	2	1										
Ref.																											
Total skaters	21	26	29	51	39	84	64	63	59	71	88	96	67	105	83	112	128	133	129	145	143	147	146	149	153	117	
Total nations	6	8	11	12	13	17	12	15	15	14	15	17	18	18	20	20	26	28	28	37	31	35	31	30	32	30	

=== Medals per year ===
Number of medals in figure skating won per country
Nation	'08	'20	'24	'28	'32	'36	'48	'52	'56	'60	'64	'68	'72	'76	'80	'84	'88	'92	'94	'98	'02	'06	'10	'14	'18	'22	'26	Total
Austria			3	4	2	3	2	1	2	–	1	1	1	–	–		–	–		–		–	–	–	–	–	–	20
Belgium		–	–	1	–	–	1									–	–				–	–	–	–	–	–	–	2
Canada			–	–	1	–	2	–	1	2	2	–	1	1	–	1	3	1	2	1	1	1	2	3	4	–	1	30
China															–	–	–	–	1	1	1	2	2	–	1	1	–	9
Czechoslovakia			–	–	–	–	–		–	1	–	1	1	–	–	1	–	1										5
East Germany												1	1	3	3	1	1											10
Finland		1	1	–	–	–		–	–					–	–			–	–	–	–	–	–		–	–	–	2
France		–	1	1	1		–	1	–	–	1	1	1	–	–	–	–	1	1	2	1	–	–	–	1	1	1	15
Georgia																					–	–	–	–	–	–	1	1
Germany	2			–	–	2		1										–	–	1	–	–	1	1	1	–	1	10
United Team of Germany									–	1	2																	3
Great Britain	6	1	1	–	–	1	1	1	–	–	–	–	–	1	1	1	–	–	1	–	–	–	–	–	–	–	–	15
Hungary					1	1	1	1	1		–	–	–	–	1	–	–	–	–	–	–	–	–		–	–	–	6
Italy						–	–	–	–	–	–	–	–	–	–	–	–	–		–	1	–	–	1	–	–	1	3
Japan					–	–				–	–	–	–	–	–	–	–	1	–	–	–	1	2	1	2	4	6	17
Kazakhstan																			–	–			–	1	–		1	2
Netherlands								–	–	1	1		–	1												–	–	3
Norway		3	–	1	1	1	–	–			–													–				6
Olympic Athletes from Russia																									3			3
ROC																										6		6
Russia	1																		5	5	5	4	2	5				27
South Korea												–	–	–	–	–	–	–	–	–	–		1	1	–	–	–	2
Soviet Union										–	1	2	3	4	4	5	5											24
Spain									–						–		–		–	–			–	–	1	–	–	1
Sweden	3	3	1	1	1	1		–	–		–	–	–		–	–	–	–		–		–	–	–	–	–	–	10
Switzerland		–	1	–		–	1	–	–	–	–	–	–	–	–	–	–		–	–	–	1	–		–	–	–	3
Ukraine																			1	–	–	1	–	–	–	–	–	2
Unified Team																		5										5
United States	–	1	1	1	2	–	1	4	5	4	2	2	1	2	2	3	3	3	1	2	3	2	2	2	2	3	3	57
West Germany												1	–	–	1	–	–											2
Ref.																												

== Overall medal table ==
Sources (after the 2026 Winter Olympics):
Accurate as of the 2026 Winter Olympics.

Rank	Nation	Gold	Silver	Bronze	Total
1	United States	19	17	21	57
2	Russia	15	9	3	27
3	Soviet Union	10	9	5	24
4	Austria	7	9	4	20
5	Canada	6	11	13	30
6	Germany	5	4	4	13
7	France	5	3	7	15
7	Great Britain	5	3	7	15
9	Sweden	5	3	2	10
10	Japan	4	8	5	17
11	East Germany	3	3	4	10
12	Norway	3	2	1	6
13	Unified Team	3	1	1	5
14	ROC	2	5	2	9
15	China	2	3	4	9
16	Netherlands	1	2	0	3
17	Czechoslovakia	1	1	3	5
18	Finland	1	1	0	2
18	South Korea	1	1	0	2
20	Belgium	1	0	1	2
20	Kazakhstan	1	0	1	2
20	Ukraine	1	0	1	2
23	Hungary	0	2	4	6
24	Switzerland	0	2	1	3
25	Georgia	0	1	0	1
26	Italy	0	0	3	3
27	West Germany	0	0	2	2
28	Spain	0	0	1	1
Totals (28 entries)		101	100	100	301

== See also ==
- List of Olympic venues in figure skating
- List of Olympic medalists in figure skating

== Works cited ==
- Hines, James R. (2006). Figure Skating: A History. Urbana, Illinois: University of Illinois Press. ISBN 978-0-252-07286-4. OCLC 59149288.
- Hines, James R. (2011). Historical Dictionary of Figure Skating. Lanham, Maryland: Scarecrow Press. ISBN 978-0-8108-6859-5.
- Hines, James R. (2015). Figure Skating in the Formative Years: Singles, Pairs, and the Expanding Role of Women. Urbana, Illinois: University of Illinois Press. ISBN 978-0-252-03906-5.
- Kestnbaum, Ellyn (2003). Culture on Ice: Figure Skating and Cultural Meaning. Middletown, Connecticut: Wesleyan University Press. ISBN 0819566411.
- "Qualification System – XXV Olympic Winter Games – Milano Cortina 2026: Figure Skating" (PDF). International Skating Union. Archived (PDF) from the original on December 9, 2023.
- "Special Regulations & Technical Rules – Single & Pair Skating and Ice Dance 2024" (PDF). International Skating Union. Archived (PDF) from the original on November 9, 2024.

Media related to Figure skating at the Olympics at Wikimedia Commons
