= Lidia Popova =

Russian figure skater

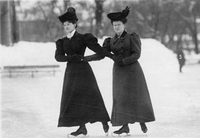

Figure skating career
- Country: Russia
- Coach: Nikolai Panin
Medal record
Representing Russia
Pairs figure skating
World Championships
Bronze medal – third place	1908 St. Petersburg	Pairs
Russian Championships
Silver medal – second place	1911 Saint Petersburg	Ladies’ Singles

Lidia Popova (Russian: Лидия П. Попова) was a Russian figure skater who competed in both ladies' singles and pair skating.

With partner Alexander Fischer, they were the first Russian skaters to win a medal in pairs skating at World Championships. It happened at the very first World Pairs Figure Skating Championship in 1908 where they were third.

== Competitive highlights ==
=== Ladies ===
Event	1911
Russian Championships	2nd

=== Pairs ===
With Alexander Fischer

Event	1908
World Championships	3rd
