= Arthur Cumming (figure skater) =

British figure skater

Personal information
- Full name: Arthur Warren Jack Cumming
- Born: 8 May 1889
- Died: 9 May 1914 (aged 25)

Figure skating career
- Country: Great Britain
Medal record
Men's figure skating
Representing Great Britain
Olympic Games
Silver medal – second place	1908 London	Special figures

Arthur Warren Jack Cumming (8 May 1889 – 9 May 1914) was a British figure skater. He came in second of the three participants in the special figures event at the 1908 Summer Olympics, earning him a silver medal. This was the only year in which special figures was an Olympic event. Cumming also participated in pair skating with partner Mrs. Arthur Cadogan. They placed 7th at the World Championships in 1912 and 1913. Cumming was involved in a motorcycle accident in May 1914 after which he contracted tetanus and died.

== Results ==
=== Men's singles ===
Event	1911	1912	1913
World Championships	5th		
British Championships	1st		1st

=== Pairs ===
(with Mrs. Arthur Cadogan)

Event	1912	1913
World Championships	7th	7th

=== Special Figures ===
Event	1908
Olympic Games	2nd
