= Arthur Cumming =

Arthur Cumming may refer to:

- Arthur Cumming (figure skater) (1889–1914), British figure skater
- Arthur Cumming (Royal Navy officer) (1817–1893), Admiral of the Royal Navy
- Arthur Edward Cumming (1896–1971), British Army officer and Victoria Cross recipient
