= Alexander Fischer (figure skater) =

Russian figure skater

Figure skating career
- Country: Russia
- Coach: Nikolai Panin
Medal record
Representing Russia
Pairs figure skating
World Championships
Bronze medal – third place	1908 St. Petersburg	Pairs

Alexander Fischer (Russian: Александр Л. Фишер) was a Russian figure skater who competed in pair skating.

He resided in Saint Petersburg.

In 1908, Fischer and his partner, Lidia Popova, participated in the first ever World Pairs Figure Skating Championship and won the bronze medal, thus becoming the first Russian skaters to win a medal in pairs skating at World Championships. The pair was coached by Nikolai Panin.

== Competitive highlights ==
With Lidia Popova

Event	1908
World Championships	3rd
