= Henning Grenander =

Swedish figure skater

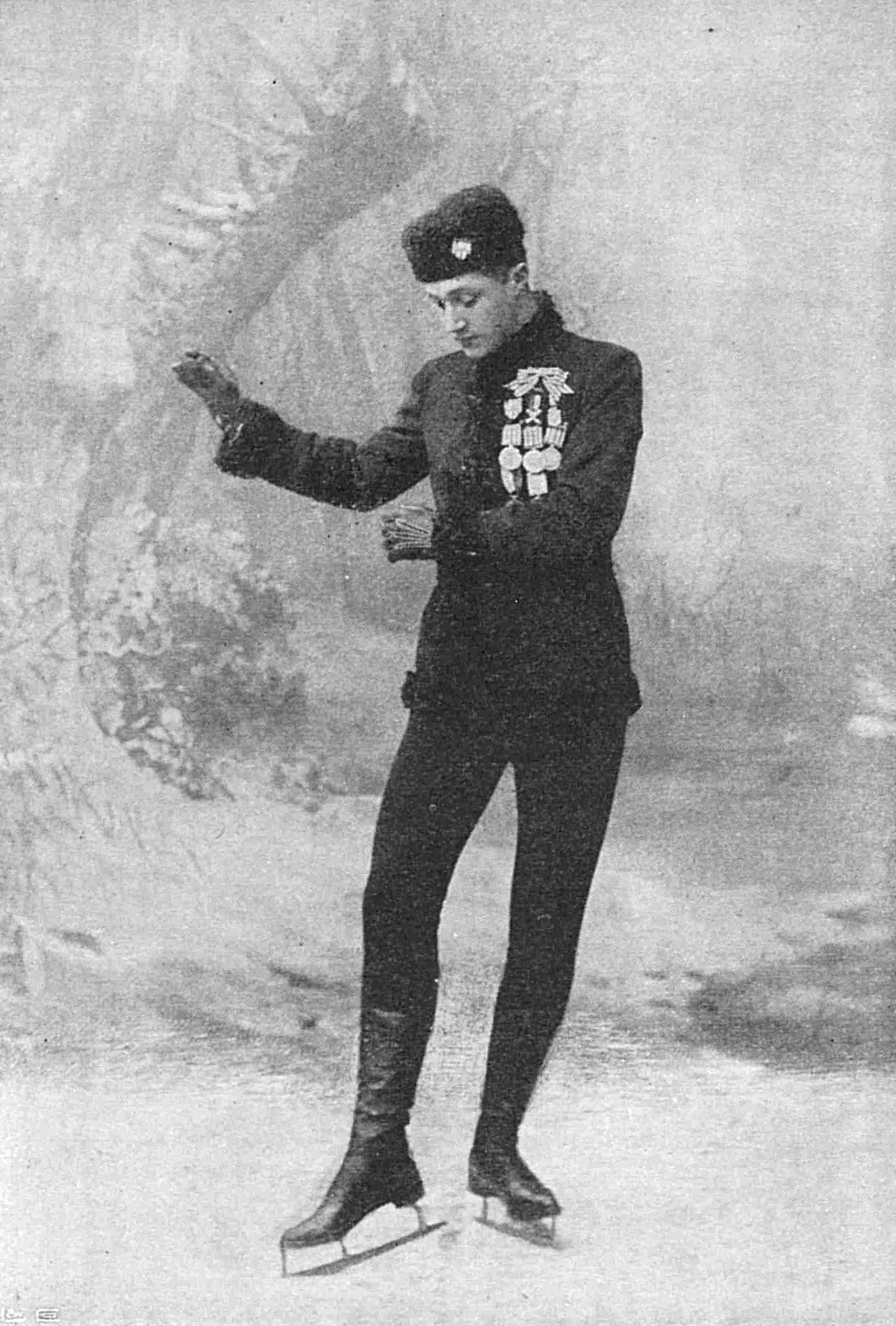
- Portrait of Grenander taken in the early 1890s

Personal information
- Born: 4 August 1874 Skövde, Sweden
- Died: 11 March 1958 (aged 83) Torquay, England

Figure skating career
- Country: Sweden
Medal record
Representing Sweden
Men's Figure skating
World Championships
Gold medal – first place	1898 London	Men's singles
European Championships
Silver medal – second place	1893 Berlin	Men's singles

Henning Grenander (4 August 1874 – 11 March 1958) was a Swedish figure skater. He was the 1898 World Champion.

== Career ==
Grenander was born on 4 August 1874 in Skövde, Sweden. He began attending a school in Stockholm when he was 8 and began learning how to skate when he was 11. He moved to Longdon in 1896, where he trained as a physiotherapist and studied at St George's, University of London. He worked as a masseur on Wimpole Street.

He won a silver medal at the 1893 European Figure Skating Championships, but the results were later declared invalid due to issues with the scoring rules. A few years later, he won the gold medal at the 1898 World Figure Skating Championships, the only time he competed at the World Championships.

Outside of his competitive career, he became involved with the National Skating Association. He helped plan the 1908 Summer Olympics and was a judge in the men's singles figure skating and men's special figures events.

== Personal life ==
Grenander was the youngest of nine children, and he married Isabella Wilson, who worked as a milliner, in 1901; the couple had a daughter, Jean Ingeborg. Besides skating, he also enjoyed riding and sailing and acted as an interpreter during the sailing event at the 1948 Olympics. He moved to Torquay, England around 1943, where he died in a nursing home on 11 March 1958.

== Results ==
Event	1893	1898
World Championships		1st
European Championships	2nd	
