= Figure skating at the 1908 Summer Olympics – Pairs =

Figure skating at the Olympics

Pairs figure skating at the Games of the IV Olympiad
- Date: 29 October 1908
- Competitors: 6 from 2 nations

Medalists
| 1st place, gold medalist(s) | | Heinrich Burger / Anna Hübler | Germany |
| 2nd place, silver medalist(s) | | James H. Johnson / Phyllis Johnson | Great Britain |
| 3rd place, bronze medalist(s) | | Edgar Syers / Madge Syers | Great Britain |

The mixed pairs was one of four events in figure skating at the 1908 Summer Olympics. Each nation could enter up to 3 pairs (6 skaters). Twelve years later, silver medalist Phyllis Johnson would capture a bronze medal with a new partner at the 1920 Olympics.

== Competition format ==
Each skater performed a five-minute free skate. Scores from 0 to 6 were given for each figure for both (a) content (difficulty and variety) and (b) performance. The total possible score was therefore 12. Each judge would then arrange the pairs in order of total score by that judge; these ordinal rankings were used to provide final placement for the pairs, using a "majority rule"--if a majority of the judges ranked a pair first, the pair won. If there was no majority, the total ordinals controlled. Ties were broken by total points.

== Results ==
The judges were unanimous in ranking the German pair first. For second place, two judges scored a tie between the Johnsons and the Syerses, while three judges put the Johnsons clearly in second; this being a majority, the Johnsons received the silver medal.

| Rank | Skaters | Nation | Points (Rank) | | | | | Average score | Total ordinals |
| Rank | Skaters | Nation | (Germany) HW | (Switzerland) GH | (Argentina) HT | (United Kingdom) HF | (Russian Empire) GS | Average score | Total ordinals |
|---|---|---|---|---|---|---|---|---|---|
| 1st place, gold medalist(s) | Anna Hübler; Heinrich Burger | Germany | 10 (1) | 12 (1) | 11 (1) | 12 (1) | 11 (1) | 11.20 | 5 |
| 2nd place, silver medalist(s) | Phyllis Johnson; James H. Johnson | Great Britain | 9 (2) | 11.5 (2) | 10.5 (2) | 10.5 (2) | 10 (2) | 10.30 | 10 |
| 3rd place, bronze medalist(s) | Madge Syers; Edgar Syers | Great Britain | 9 (2) | 11.5 (2) | 10 (3) | 8 (3) | 9.5 (3) | 9.60 | 13 |

Referee:

- (United Kingdom) Herbert G. Fowler

Judges:

- (Germany) Hermann Wendt
- (Switzerland) Gustav Hügel
- (Argentina) Horatio Torromé
- (United Kingdom) Harry D. Faith
- (Russian Empire) Georg Sanders

== Sources ==
- Cook, Theodore Andrea (1908). The Fourth Olympiad, Being the Official Report. London: British Olympic Association.
- De Wael, Herman. Herman's Full Olympians: "Figure skating 1908". Accessed 2 May 2006. Available electronically at.
