= Anna Hübler =

German pair skater

Annie Hübler
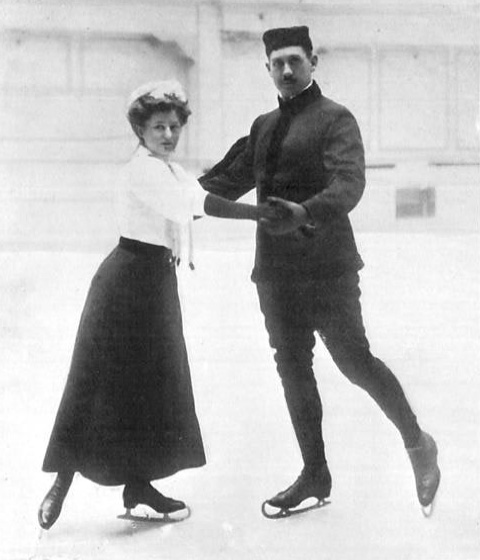
- Hübler with Heinrich Burger at the 1908 Olympics

Personal information
- Full name: Anna Hübler
- Born: 2 January 1885 Munich, German Empire
- Died: 5 July 1976 (aged 91) Munich, West Germany

Figure skating career
- Country: Germany
- Retired: 1910
Medal record
Representing Germany
Pairs Figure skating
Olympic Games
| Gold medal – first place | 1908 London | Pairs |
World Championships
| Gold medal – first place | 1910 Berlin | Pairs |
| Gold medal – first place | 1908 St. Petersburg | Pairs |

Anna "Annie" Hübler (2 January 1885 – 5 July 1976) was a German pair skater, born in Munich. She was an Olympic champion and two-time World champion with skating partner Heinrich Burger.

Hübler and Burger were the first World champions and the first Olympic champions in pairs figure skating. They never became European champions because the European championships did not include a pairs competition until 1930.

They skated for the club Münchener EV (Munich EV).

Hübler was the first female German Olympic champion. (The first woman to win an Olympic medal for Germany was the single skater Elsa Rendschmidt. She won silver in 1908.)

After retiring from figure skating, Hübler became a singer and actress. She later owned a department store.

== Results ==
(pairs with Heinrich Burger)

| Event | 1907 | 1908 | 1909 | 1910 |
|---|---|---|---|---|
| Summer Olympic Games | | 1st | | |
| World Championships | | 1st | | 1st |
| German Championships | 1st | | 1st | |
