= 1908 Currie Cup =

Domestic rugby union competition

- Countries: South Africa
- Champions: Western Province (8th title)

The 1908 Currie Cup was the ninth edition of the Currie Cup, the premier domestic rugby union competition in South Africa.

The tournament was won by Western Province for the eighth time, who won seven of their matches in the competition and drew the other match.

== See also ==
- Currie Cup
