= 1908 World Figure Skating Championships =

Annual figure skating competition held in 1908

- Type: ISU Championship
- Season: 1908
- Location: (Austrian Empire) Troppau, Austria-Hungary (singles); Saint Petersburg, Russian Empire (pairs)
- Venue: Yusupovsky Garden, Saint Petersburg

Champions
- Men's singles: (Sweden) Ulrich Salchow
- Ladies' singles: (Kingdom of Hungary) Lily Kronberger
- Pairs: (German Empire) Anna Hübler / Heinrich Burger
- Previous: 1907 World Championships
- Next: 1909 World Championships

The World Figure Skating Championships is an annual figure skating competition sanctioned by the International Skating Union in which figure skaters compete for the title of World Champion.

Men's and ladies' competitions were held on January 25–26 in Troppau, Austria-Hungary (modern-day Opava, Czech Republic). Pairs' competition took place on February 16 in Saint Petersburg, Russian Empire. It was the first World Championships in which pair skating was contested.

== Medal table ==
* Host nations (Austrian Empire, Russian Empire)

Rank	Nation	Gold	Silver	Bronze	Total
1	Germany	1	2	1	4
2	Hungary	1	0	0	1
2	Sweden	1	0	0	1
4	Great Britain	0	1	0	1
5	Russia*	0	0	1	1
Totals (5 entries)		3	3	2	8

== Results ==
=== Men ===
Rank	Name	Places
1	(Sweden) Ulrich Salchow	9
2	(German Empire) Gilbert Fuchs	12
3	(German Empire) Heinrich Burger	21

Judges:

- (Austrian Empire) Otto Bohatsch
- (German Empire) C. Dorasil
- (German Empire) P. Engelhardt
- (United Kingdom) H. D. Faith
- (Sweden) I. Forssling
- (Austrian Empire) Gustav Hügel
- (German Empire) Otto Schöning

=== Ladies ===
Rank	Name	Points	Places
1	(Kingdom of Hungary) Lily Kronberger	204.90	5
2	(German Empire) Elsa Rendschmidt		10

Judges:

- (German Empire) P. Engelhardt
- (United Kingdom) H. D. Faith
- (Sweden) I. Forssling
- (Austrian Empire) Gustav Hügel
- (German Empire) Otto Schöning

=== Pairs ===
Rank	Name	Places
1	(German Empire) Anna Hübler / Heinrich Burger	5
2	(United Kingdom) Phyllis Johnson / James Johnson	11.5
3	(Russian Empire) Lidia Popova / Alexander Fischer	13.5

Judges:

- (Russian Empire) Aleksandr Ivashentsov
- (Russian Empire) J. Kettnitz
- (Russian Empire) V. Shnobel
- (Russian Empire) Vyacheslav Sreznevsky
- (Russian Empire) Rudolf Sundgren
