= Heinrich Burger =

German figure skater (1881–1942)

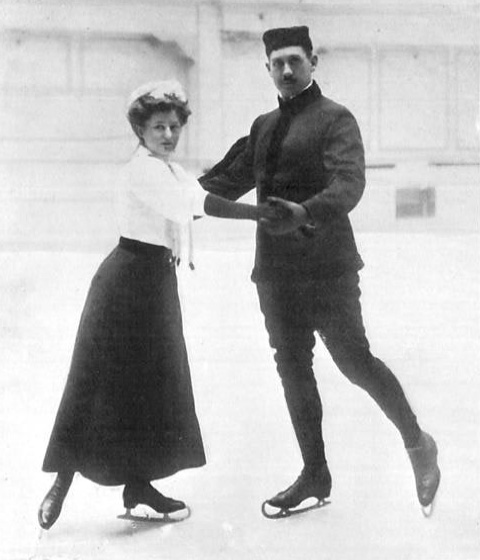
- Heinrich Burger skates with Anna Hübler

Personal information
- Born: 31 May 1881 Munich, German Empire
- Died: 27 April 1942 (aged 60) Munich, Germany

Figure skating career
- Country: Germany
- Retired: 1910
Medal record
Representing Germany
Men's Figure skating
World Championships
Bronze medal – third place	1908 Troppau	Men's singles
Silver medal – second place	1906 Munich	Men's singles
Silver medal – second place	1904 Belin	Men's singles
European Championships
Silver medal – second place	1905 Bonn	Men's singles
Pairs Figure skating
Olympic Games
Gold medal – first place	1908 London	Pairs
World Championships
Gold medal – first place	1910 Berlin	Pairs
Gold medal – first place	1908 St. Petersburg	Pairs

Olympic medal record

Figure skating
Gold medal – first place	1908 London	Pairs

Heinrich Burger (31 May 1881 – 27 April 1942) was a German figure skater. He competed in both singles and pair skating events. As a pair skater, he was Olympic champion and two-time World champion with Anna Hübler.

Burger and Hübler were the first world champions and the first Olympic champions in pair skating. They never became European champions, because the European championships did not include a pairs competition until 1930. They skated for the club Müchener EV (Munich EV). According to figure skating historian James R. Hines, "Contemporary accounts recognize them for their strength and speed, noting that they always skated in perfect time with the music."

Heinrich Burger was also a lawyer in Munich.

== Results ==
(men's singles)

Event	1904	1905	1906	1907	1908
World Championships	2nd		2nd	5th	3rd
European Championships	WD	2nd			
German Championships	1st	2nd	1st	1st	

(pairs with Anna Hübler)

Event	1907	1908	1909	1910
Summer Olympic Games		1st		
World Championships		1st		1st
German Championships	1st		1st	
