= Figure skating at the 1908 Summer Olympics – Men's special figures =

Figure skating at the Olympics

Men's special figures figure skating at the Games of the IV Olympiad
- Date: 29 October 1908
- Competitors: 3 from 2 nations

Medalists
1st place, gold medalist(s)		Nikolai Panin	Russian Empire
2nd place, silver medalist(s)		Arthur Cumming	Great Britain
3rd place, bronze medalist(s)		Geoffrey Hall-Say	Great Britain

The men's special figures was one of four events in figure skating at the 1908 Summer Olympics. Each nation could enter up to 3 skaters. Gold medalist Nikolai Panin's real name was Nikolai Kolomenkin, but he competed under the pseudonym "Panin".

== Competition format ==
Each skater had to complete four voluntary figures. Scores from 0 to 6 were given for each figure for both (a) content (difficulty and novelty) and (b) performance. The total possible score was therefore 48. Each judge would then arrange the skaters in order of total score by that judge; these ordinal rankings were used to provide final placement for the skaters, using a "majority rule"—if a majority of the judges ranked a pair first, the pair won. If there was no majority, the total ordinals controlled. Ties were broken by total points.

== Results ==
The judges were unanimous in ranking Panin first, Cumming second, and Hall-Say third. The Official Report states that Panin "was far in advance of his opponents, both in the difficulty of his figures, and in the ease and accuracy of their execution." Cumming is described as "skating with much facility and accuracy," while the report contends that Hall-Say was "not yet sufficiently experienced in the international style to himself full justice in a competition, his form being inferior to his execution."

Rank	Name	Nation	Points (Rank)					Average score	Total ordinals
Rank	Name	Nation	(Sweden) HG	(Sweden) EH	(Switzerland) GH	(Germany) HW	(Russian Empire) GS	Average score	Total ordinals
1st place, gold medalist(s)	Nikolai Panin	Russian Empire	44 (1)	44 (1)	44 (1)	42 (1)	45 (1)	43.8	5
2nd place, silver medalist(s)	Arthur Cumming	Great Britain	32.5 (2)	32.0 (2)	37.5 (2)	30.5 (2)	31.5 (2)	32.8	10
3rd place, bronze medalist(s)	Geoffrey Hall-Say	Great Britain	23 (3)	17 (3)	18 (3)	25 (3)	21 (3)	20.8	15

Referee:

- (United Kingdom) Herbert G. Fowler

Judges:

- (Sweden) Henning Grenander
- (Sweden) Edvard Hörle
- (Switzerland) Gustav Hügel
- (Germany) Hermann Wendt
- (Russian Empire) Georg Sanders

== Sources ==
- Cook, Theodore Andrea (1908). The Fourth Olympiad, Being the Official Report. London: British Olympic Association.
- De Wael, Herman. Herman's Full Olympians: "Figure skating 1908". Accessed 2 May 2006. Available electronically at.
