= Figure skating at the 1908 Summer Olympics =

Figure skating at the Games of the IV Olympiad
- Venue: Prince's Skating Club; London, United Kingdom
- Dates: 28–29 October
- Competitors: 21 from 6 nations

Four figure skating events were contested at the 1908 Summer Olympics in London, but they were held in October 1908, six months after most of the other Olympic events at the 1908 Games. The figure skating competition took place at the Prince's Skating Club, in the district of Knightsbridge. It was the first time that a winter sport had ever been included in the Olympic Games, sixteen years before the first Winter Olympics in Chamonix. The number of competitors was very low, with two events having only three entrants, guaranteeing a medal for participation.

== Medal summary ==
=== Medalists ===
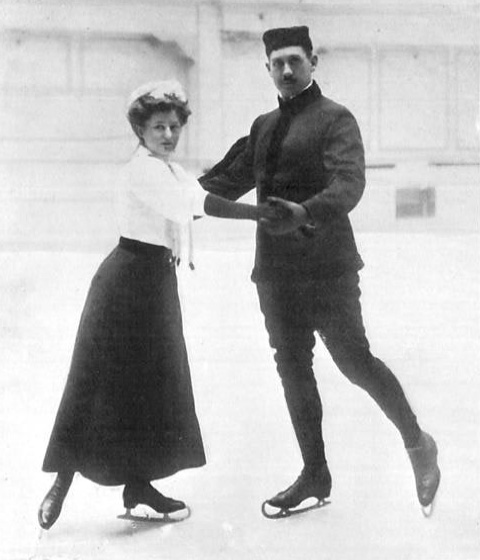
The German gold medal winners in pair skating, Anna Hübler and Heinrich Burger

Event	Gold	Silver	Bronze
Men's singles	Ulrich Salchow; Sweden	Richard Johansson; Sweden	Per Thorén; Sweden
Men's special figures	Nikolai Panin; Russian Empire	Arthur Cumming; Great Britain	Geoffrey Hall-Say; Great Britain
Ladies' singles	Madge Syers; Great Britain	Elsa Rendschmidt; Germany	Dorothy Greenhough-Smith; Great Britain
Pairs	Anna Hübler and Heinrich Burger; Germany	Phyllis Johnson and James H. Johnson; Great Britain	Madge Syers and Edgar Syers; Great Britain

=== Medal table ===
Rank	Nation	Gold	Silver	Bronze	Total
1	Great Britain	1	2	3	6
2	Sweden	1	1	1	3
3	Germany	1	1	0	2
4	Russian Empire	1	0	0	1
Totals (4 entries)		4	4	4	12

== Participating nations ==
21 figure skaters from 6 nations competed.

- Argentina (1)
- Germany (3)
- Great Britain (11)
- Russian Empire (1)
- Sweden (4)
- United States (1)

== Sources ==
- Cook, Theodore Andrea (1908). The Fourth Olympiad, Being the Official Report (PDF). London: British Olympic Association. pp. 284–295. Archived from the original (PDF) on 26 December 2013. (courtesy LA84 Foundation Sports Library)
- "London 1908 Figure Skating". Olympic.org. International Olympic Committee.
- "Figure Skating at the 1908 London Summer Games". SR/Olympic Sports. Sports Reference. Archived from the original on 17 April 2020.
- "Results of the Olympic Winter Games". Memories of the Olympic Winter Games. Archived from the original on 7 April 2014.
