= Pair skating =

Discipline of figure skating

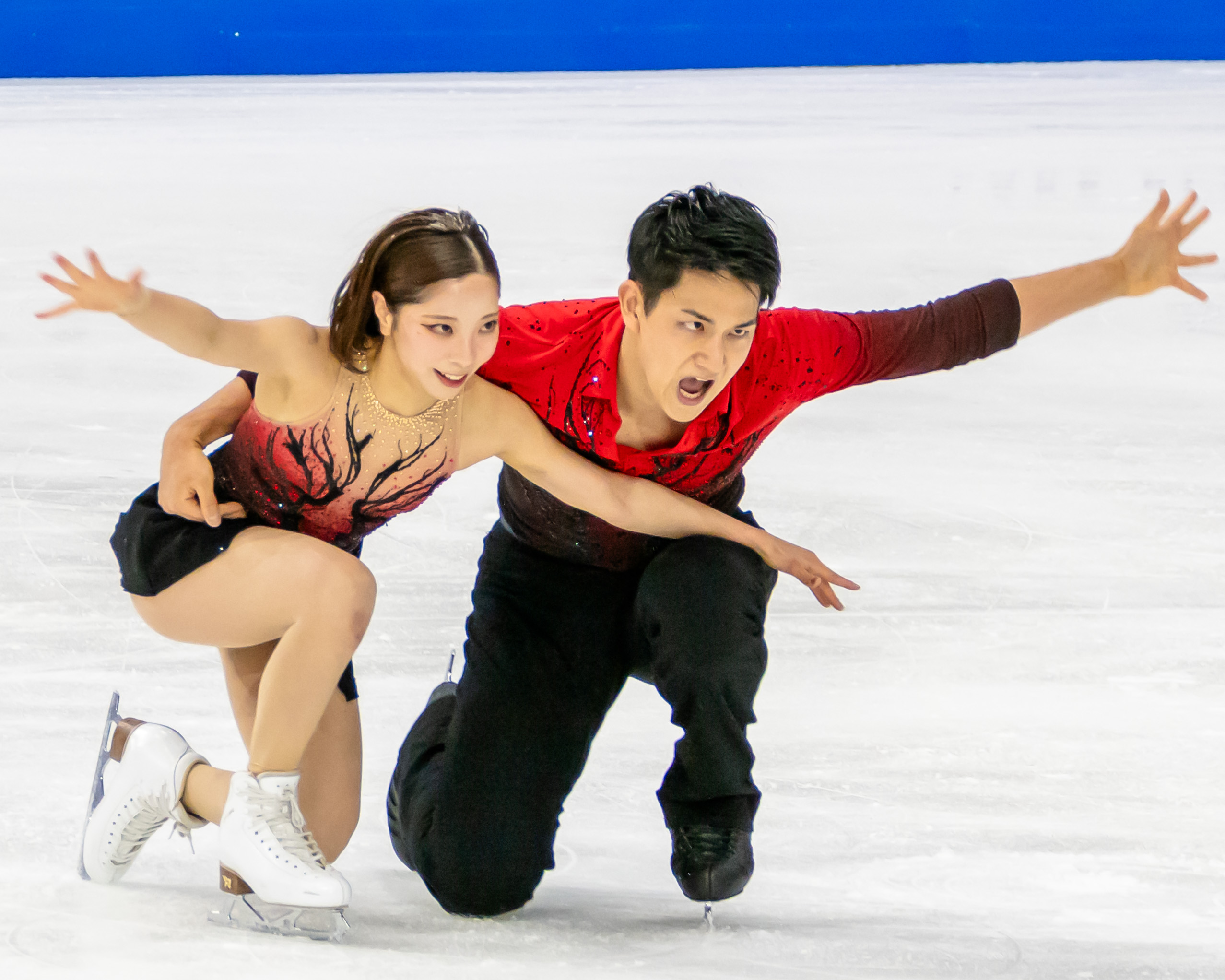
- Riku Miura and Ryuichi Kihara of Japan, the reigning Olympic champions in pair skating
- Highest governing body: International Skating Union

Characteristics
- Team members: Pairs
- Mixed-sex: Yes
- Equipment: Figure skates

Presence
- Olympic: Part of the Summer Olympics in 1908 and 1920; Part of the first Winter Olympics in 1924 to today

Pair skating is a figure skating discipline defined by the International Skating Union (ISU) as "the skating of two persons in unison who perform their movements in such harmony with each other as to give the impression of genuine Pair Skating as compared with independent Single Skating". The ISU also states that a pairs team consists of "one Woman and one Man". Pair skating, along with men's and women's single skating, has been an Olympic discipline since figure skating, the oldest Winter Olympic sport, was introduced at the 1908 Summer Olympics in London. The ISU World Figure Skating Championships introduced pair skating in 1908.

Like the other disciplines, pair skating competitions consist of two segments, the short program and the free skating program. There are seven required elements in the short program, which lasts two minutes and 40 seconds for both junior and senior pair teams. Free skating for pairs "consists of a well balanced program composed and skated to music of the pair's own choice for a specified period of time". It also should contain "especially typical Pair Skating moves" such as pair spins, lifts, partner assisted jumps, spirals, and other linking movements. Its duration, like the other disciplines, is four minutes for senior teams, and three and one-half minutes for junior teams. Pair skating required elements include lifts, twist lifts, throw jumps, jumps, spin combinations, death spirals, step sequences, and choreographic sequences. The elements performed by pairs teams must be "linked together by connecting steps of a different nature" and by other comparable movements and with a variety of holds and positions. Pair skaters must only execute the prescribed elements; if they do not, the extra or unprescribed elements will not be counted in their score. Violations in pair skating include falls, time, music, and clothing.

Pair skating is the most dangerous discipline in figure skating; it has been compared to playing in the National Football League. Pair skaters have more injuries than skaters in other disciplines, and women pair skaters have more injuries than male pair skaters.

== History ==
=== Beginnings ===
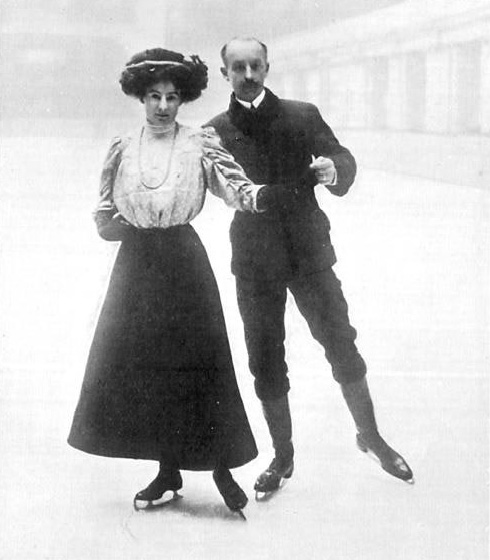
German pair team Madge Syers and Edgar Syers at the 1908 Olympics

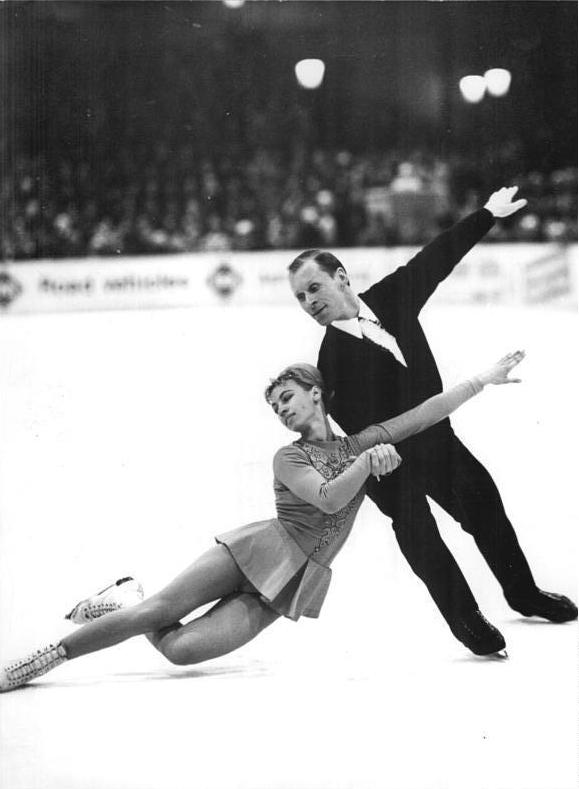
Liudmila Belousova and Oleg Protopopov (the "Protopopovs"), in 1968

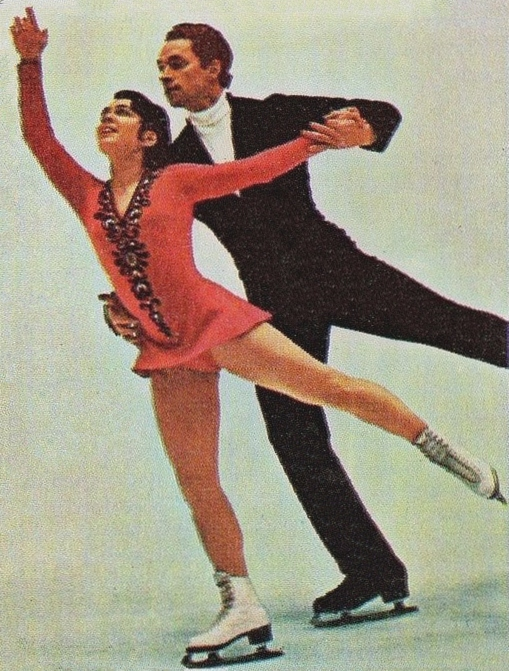
Irina Rodnina and Alexei Ulanov, in 1972

The International Skating Union (ISU) defines pair skating as "the skating of two persons in unison who perform their movements in such harmony with each other as to give the impression of genuine Pair Skating as compared with independent Single Skating". The ISU also states that a pair team consists of "one Woman and one Man" and that "attention should be paid to the selection of an appropriate partner". (Note: Women were referred to as ladies in ISU regulations and communications until the 2021–22 season.)

The roots of pairs skating, like ice dance, is in the "combined skating" developed in the 19th century by skating clubs and organizations and by recreational social skating between couples and friends, who would skate waltzes, marches, and other social dances together. According to writer Ellyn Kestnbaum, the rising popularity of skating during the 19th century led to the development of figure skating techniques, especially the "various forms of hand-in-hand skating that would become the basis of pair skating". Kestnbaum believes that there is no technical reason why pair skating moves could not be performed by opposite sexes because the moves emphasize the symmetry and similarity of the two bodies making them. Kestnbaum also states that men developed the original concepts of combined skating because most advanced skating was done by adult males. When women became more involved in the sport, they were allowed to compete in "similar pairs" competitions in the U.S.

Figure skating historian James R. Hines reports that factors, such as hand-in-hand skating and "the crazelike fascination with ice dancing" in the mid-1890s, contributed to the development of pair skating. Madge Syers, the first female figure skater to compete and win internationally, states that from the beginning of the introduction of pair skating in international competitions, it was a popular sport for audiences to watch, and that "if the pair are well matched and clever performers, it is undoubtedly the most attractive to watch". When women began to compete in figure skating in the early 1900s, married couples developed routines together and provided female partners with the opportunities to demonstrate parity with their male partners by executing the same moves. Syers states that Viennese skaters were responsible for pair skating's popularity at the beginning of the 20th century and credits the Austrians for adding dance moves to pair skating.

At first, pair skating consisted of executing basic figures and side-by-side free-skating moves, such as long, flowing spirals done backwards or forwards, and connected with dance steps while couples held one or two hands. Jumps and pirouettes were not required and were done only by experienced pair skaters. German pair skater Heinrich Burger, in his article in Irving Brokaw's The Art of Skating (1915), states that he and his partner, Anna Hübler, inserted figures skated by single skaters into "our several dances according to the music" (Note: Hines says that Burger and Hübler were known for their strength and speed, and for skating "in time with the music".) until the figures became more complicated and developed into a different appearance; as Burger puts it, "the fundamental character of the figure, however, has remained the same". Also in the 1890s, combined and hand-in-hand skating moved skating away from "the static confines of basic figures to continuous movement around a rink". Hines insists that the popularity of skating waltzes, which depended upon the speed and flow across the ice of couples in dance positions and not just on holding hands with a partner, "dealt a death knell to hand-in-hand skating".

=== Early years ===
Pair skating, along with men's and women's single skating, has been an Olympic discipline since figure skating, the oldest Winter Olympic sport, was introduced at the 1908 Summer Olympics in London. The ISU World Figure Skating Championships introduced pair skating, along with women's singles, also in 1908. Hübler and Burger were the first Olympic gold medalists in pair skating in 1908; they also won the 1908 and 1910 World Championships. In 1936, Maxi Herber and Ernst Baier won the gold medal at the Olympics and went on to win the World Championships from 1936 to 1939. The first pair skating national competitions in Canada occurred in 1905, and the first time pair skating was included during a U.S. Championships was in 1914, but there are only a few descriptions of pair skating in North America before World War I.

Side-by-side skating, also called shadow skating, in which partners executed the same movements and steps in unison, was emphasized in the early 1920s. Pair skating became more athletic in the 1930s; partners executed "a balanced blend of shadow skating coupled with increasingly spectacular pair moves, including spins, death-spirals, and lifts". Hines credits German pair skaters Maxi Herber and Ernst Baier and French team Andrée Brunet and Pierre Brunet with developing athletic elements and programs that included pair spins, side-by-side spins, lifts, throw jumps, side-by-side jumps, and side-by-side footwork sequences. By the 1930s, pair skating had advanced; Hines states, "It was not yet viewed equally with singles skating, at least from a technically standpoint, but it had grown to be a much-appreciated discipline". Hines also reports that many single skaters during the era also competed in pair skating.

Soviet and Russian domination in pair skating began in the 1950s and continued throughout the rest of the 1900s. Only five non-Soviet or non-Russian teams won the World Championships between 1965 and 2010. Soviet pair teams won gold medals in seven consecutive Olympics, from 1964 in Innsbruck to 1988 in Calgary. Kestnbaum credits the Soviets for emphasizing ballet, theater, and folk dance in all disciplines of figure skating, noting the influence of Soviet pair team and married couple Liudmila Belousova and Oleg Protopopov. The Protopopovs, as they were called, won gold medals at the 1964 and 1968 Olympics, as well as the 1968 World Championships, "raised by several degrees the level of translating classical dance to the ice". Hines reports that the Protopopovs represented a new style of pair skating developed during the 1960s. He states, "A more flowing style presented by the Russians was replacing an older, more disconnected style". The Protopopovs, like single skaters Sonja Henie in the 1930s and Dick Button in the 1940s, while winning multiple Olympic medals, "altered dramatically the direction of figure skating", and marked the beginning of the Soviet domination of pair skating for the rest of the 20th century. Irina Rodnina, with her partner Alexei Ulanov and later Alexander Zaitsev, also from the Soviet Union, dominated pair skating throughout the 1970s and "led the trend of female pair skaters as risk-taking athletes". With Ulanov, Rodnina won World and European titles for four years in a row and an Olympic gold medal in 1972. Rodnina and her second partner, Zaitsev, won the 1973 European Championships and were "never seriously challenged" between 1974 and 1978, winning gold medals at the 1976 Olympics and at every World and European Championships during that period. They also won gold medals at the 1980 European Championships and at the Olympics that same year. Hines states, about Rodnina and her partners, that they "transformed pair skating through expanded and inspired athleticism".

=== Later years ===
Pair skating, which has never included a compulsory phase like the other figure skating disciplines, did not require a short program until the early 1960s, when the ISU "instituted a short program of required moves" as the first part of pair competitions. The change was due "to a few controversial decisions in the 1950s and the discipline's increasing technical complexities". In 1964, at the European Championships in Grenoble, France, and the 1964 World Championships in Dortmund, West Germany, and during the Olympics in 1968, a two-and-a-half-minute-long technical program was added, later called the short program, which constituted one-third of a team's scores. The arrangement of the specific moves, also unlike compulsory figures for single skaters and the compulsory dance for ice dancers, was up to each pair team. The short programs introduced in single men and women competitions in 1973 were modeled after the pair skating short program, and the structure of competitions in both single and pair competitions has been identical since the elimination of compulsory figures in 1990.

A judging scandal at the 2002 Winter Olympics in Salt Lake City, Utah, "ushered in sweeping reforms in the scoring system" of figure skating competitions. The scandal, which centered around Canadian pair team Jamie Sale and David Pelletier and Russian pair team Elena Berezhnaya and Anton Sikharulidze, brought about the end of the 6.0 scoring system and the implementation of the ISU Judging System, starting in 2004.

According to Caroline Silby, a consultant with U.S. Figure Skating, pair teams, as well as ice dance teams, have the added challenge of strengthening partnerships and ensuring that teams stay together for several years. Silby states, "Conflict between partners that is consistent and unresolved can often lead to the early demise or break-up of a team". Challenges for both pairs and dancers, which can make conflict resolution and communication difficult, include: the fewer number of available boys for girls to find partnerships; different priorities regarding commitment and scheduling; differences in partners' ages and developmental stages; differences in family situations; the common necessity of one or both partners moving to train at a new facility; and different skill levels when the partnership is formed. Silby estimates that due to the lack of effective communication among pair teams, there is a "six-fold increase in the risk of national-level figure skating teams splitting". Teams with strong skills in communication and conflict resolution, however, tend to produce "highest-placing finishers at national championship events".

In October 2022, Skate Canada, the federation that oversees figure skating in Canada, changed the wording in its by-laws to make pairs and ice dance teams composed of any "two skaters", without reference to gender. According to reporter JZ Goh, the rule change meant that teams no longer must be made up of one man and one woman, allowing same-gender and non-binary teams to compete at all levels in Canada.

== Competition segments ==
=== Short program ===
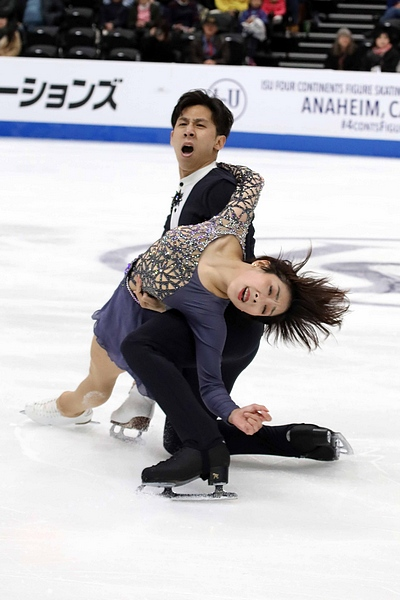
Chinese pair team Wenjing Sui and Cong Han performing their short program at the 2019 Four Continents

The short program is the first segment of single skating, pair skating, and synchronized skating in international competitions, including all ISU championships, the Olympic Winter Games, the Winter Youth Games, qualifying competitions for the Olympic Winter Games, and ISU Grand Prix events for both junior and senior-level skaters (including the finals). The short program must be skated before the free skate, the second component in competitions. The short program lasts, for both senior and junior pair skaters, two minutes and 40 seconds. The ISU states that the time a program begins "must be reckoned" from the moment the skater begins to move or skate until they come to a complete stop at the end of their program. Vocal music with lyrics has been allowed in pair skating and in all disciplines since the 2014–2015 season.

Both junior and senior pair skaters have seven required elements: a lift, a twist lift, a throw jump, a solo jump; a solo spin combination, a death spiral, and a step sequence. (Note: As of the 2026–2027 season, the solo spin combination will be replaced by the pair spin combination.) The sequence of the elements is optional. Short programs must be skated in harmony with the music, which teams choose. The short program for pair skating was introduced at the 1963 European Championships, the 1964 World Championships, and the Olympics in 1968; previously, pair skaters only had to perform the free skating program in competitions.

Wenjing Sui and Cong Han from China hold the highest pair skating short program score of 84.41 points, which they earned at the 2022 Olympic Winter Games. (Note: After the 2018–2019 season, due to the change in grade of execution scores from −3 to +3 to −5 to +5, all statistics started from zero and all previous scores were listed as "historical".)

=== Free skating ===
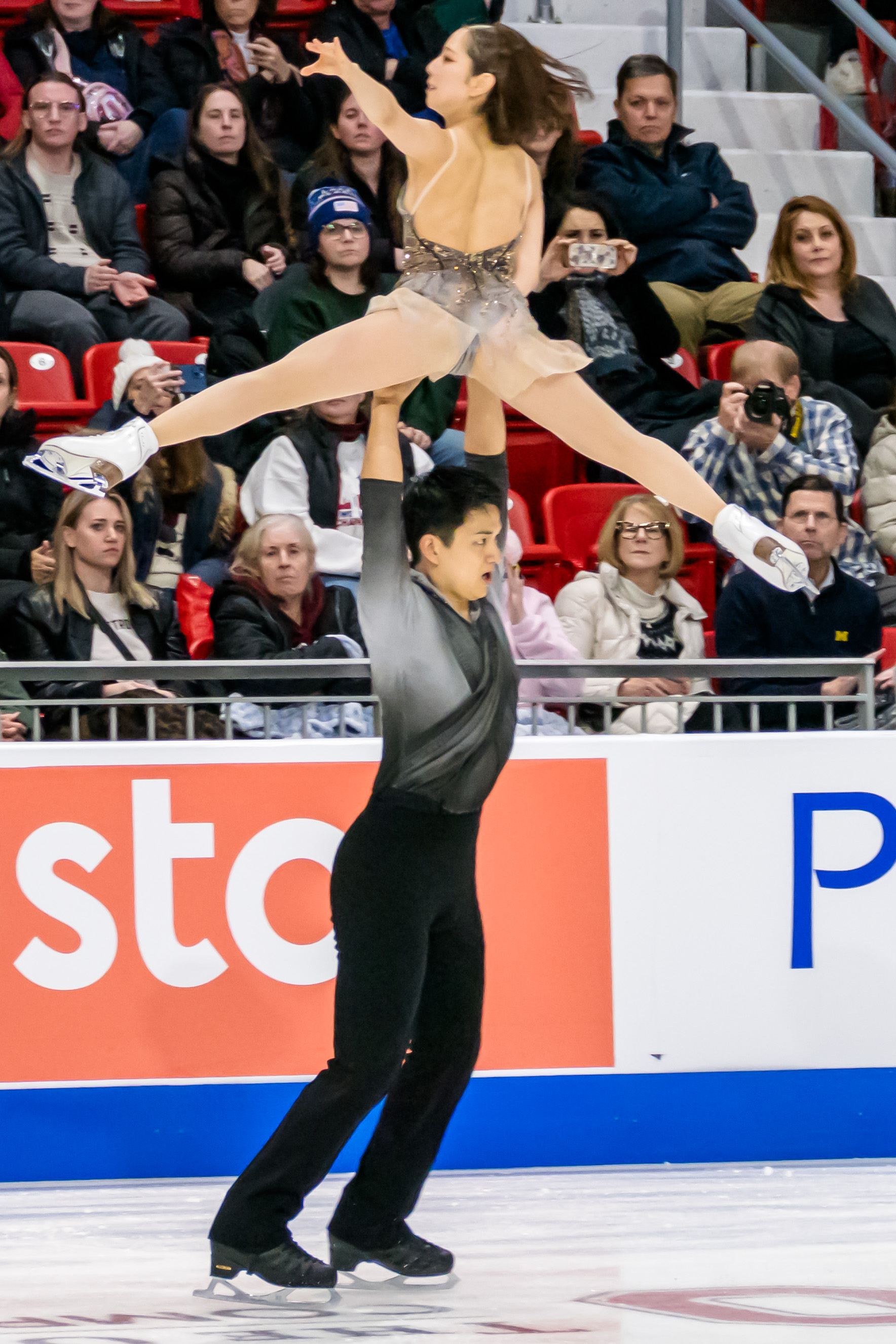
Japanese pairs team Riku Miura and Ryuichi Kihara perform their free skate at the 2025 Skate America

According to the ISU, free skating for pairs "consists of a well balanced program composed and skated to music of the pair's own choice for a specified period of time". The ISU also considers a well-done free skate one that contains both single skating moves performed either in parallel (called "shadow skating") or symmetrically (called "mirror skating"). It should also contain "especially typical Pair Skating moves" such as pair spins, lifts, partner-assisted jumps, spirals linked harmoniously by steps and other movements. (Note: Writer Ellyn Kestnbaum defines shadow skating as "the same moves performed side-by-side in close proximity and in the same direction" and mirror skating as "the same moves performed side-by-side in opposite directions".) Its duration, for both senior and junior teams, is four minutes.

A well-balanced free skate for senior pairs must consist of the following: up to three pair lifts, not all from the same group, with the lifting arm or arms fully extended; (Note: See the 2024 "Special Regulations and Technical Rules" for a list of pair skating lift groups.) exactly one twist lift, exactly one solo jump; exactly one jump sequence or combination; exactly two different throw jumps; exactly one pair spin combination; exactly one death spiral of a different type than what the skaters performed during their short program; and exactly one choreographic sequence. A well-balanced junior pair free skating program must consist of the following elements: a maximum of two lifts that must be from different groups, with the lifting arm or arms fully extended; a maximum of one twist lift; a maximum of two different throw jumps; a maximum of one solo jump; a maximum of one jump sequence or combination; a maximum of one death spiral; and a maximum of one choreographic sequence.

After the 2026–2027 season, senior pair teams had to include the following elements in their free skate: a maximum of two lifts from different groups, with the lifting arm or arms fully extended; a maximum of one twist lift, a maximum of one choreographic pair lift; a maximum of one solo jump; a maximum of one jump sequence or combination; a maximum of two different throw jumps; a maximum of one death spiral of a different type than what the skaters performed during their short program; and a maximum of one choreographic pair spin. The free skating program for junior pair skaters after 2026 contained the same elements, but instead of performing a choreographic sequence, they had to perform a maximum of one choreographic pair spin.

Riku Miura and Ryuichi Kihara from Japan hold the highest pair free skating program score of 158.13 points, which they earned at the 2026 Winter Olympics.

== Competition requirements ==
Pair skating today is arguably the most difficult discipline technically. Pair skaters do the same jumps and spins as single skaters, sometimes with fewer revolutions, but timing is far more critical because they must execute moves in perfect unison. In addition to jumps and spins, pair skaters perform lifts unique to their discipline. More intangible but no less important is the necessity for expressive and convincing interaction between partners as they interpret the music.

— Figure skating historian James Hines

Pair skating required elements include pair lifts, twist lifts, throw jumps, jumps, spin combinations, death spirals, step sequences, and choreographic sequences. The elements performed by pair teams must be "linked together by connecting steps of a different nature" and by other comparable movements and with a variety of holds and positions. The team does not have to always execute the same movements and can separate from time to time, but they have to "give an impression of unison and harmony of composition of program and of execution of the skating". They must limit movements executed on two feet and fully use the entire ice surface. The ISU also states that programs performed by pair skating teams should maintain "Harmonious steps and connecting movements, in time to the music, should be maintained throughout the program".

In 2022, the ISU voted to gradually raise the minimum age requirement for participation in international competitions at the senior level from 15 years old to 17 years old over the course of the next three seasons. As of 2024, the maximum age for junior competitors is 21 years old for the female partner and 23 years old for the male partner. Also as of 2024, the maximum age gap is seven years between partners in the junior level of competition. The ISU published the first judges' handbook for pair skating in 1966.

=== Pair lifts ===
There are five groups of pair skating lifts, categorized in order of increasing level of difficulty. Full extension of the man's lifting arm is required for lifts in groups three to five. A small lift, which can be performed with or without rotation(s), is defined as "any lift with a sustained/stabilized Woman's position in which the man's hands remain not higher than his shoulder line". Groups are determined by the hold at the moment the female parnter passes the top of the male partner's head.

Pair lift groups
Groups	Position	Notes
One	Armpit hold position	If the lift is accomplished without full arm extension, it will not count towards the skaters' final score, although it will be considered as part of their choreography.
Two	Waist hold position	If the lift is accomplished without full arm extension, it will not count towards the skaters' final score, although it will be considered as part of their choreography. If the lift is accomplished with a simple type take-off and the woman's position is vertical, with her head up facing either direction and with no other variations, the lift is categorized as a Group Two position; any other position by the woman is categorized as a Group Three position.
Three	Hand to hip or upper part of the leg (above the knee) position	
Four	Hand to hand position (Press Lift type)	The woman, during Group Four lifts, can "only rotate together with the Man".
Five	Hand to hand position (Lasso Lift type)	The woman must rotate around the man or in relation to him "during the lifting process between the take-off and the fully extended position". The rotation must be visible when looking at the shoulders and/or hips. The man's hands must remain clearly above his shoulders while he lifts the woman; if not, it will be identified as a Group Four lift. The woman's hand must be behind her back and not between her legs. (Note: See the 2025-2026 Technical Panel Handbook, p. 26, for a list of the types of Group Five pair lifts.)

Judges look for the following when evaluating pair lifts: speed of entry and exit; control of the woman's free leg when she is exiting out of the lift, with the goal of keeping the leg high and sweeping; the position of the woman in the air; the man's footwork; quick and easy changes of position; and the maintenance of flow throughout the lift. Judges begin counting how many revolutions pair teams execute from the moment when the woman leaves the ice until when the man's arm (or arms) begin to bend after he has made a full extension and the woman begins to descend. (Note: See Tech panel, p. 24, for a list of simple and difficult take-offs and landings. See p. 25 for how judges identify lift groups.)

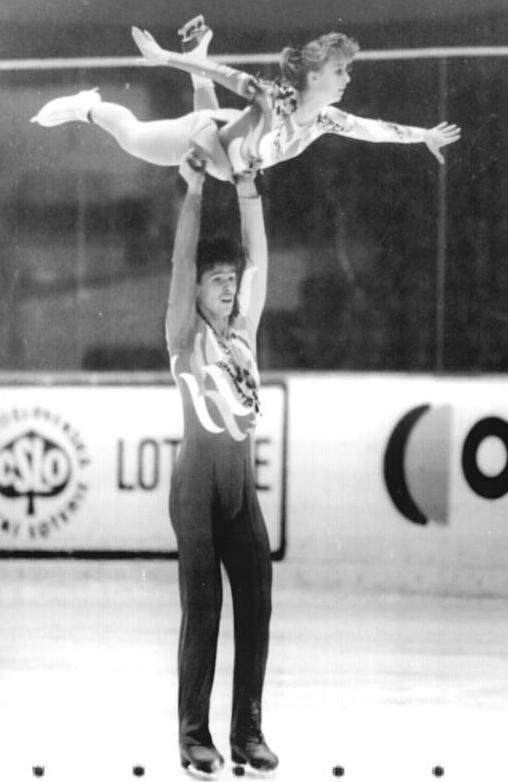
East Germans Mandy Wötzel and Axel Rauschenbach, 1988

A complete pair skating lift must include full extension of the lifting arm or arms, if required for the type of lift being performed. Small lifts, or ones in which the man does not raise his hands higher than his shoulders, or lifts that include movements in which the man holds the woman by the legs, are also allowed. The man must complete at least one revolution. A lift, other than a choreographic pair lift, is judged illegal if it is accomplished with a wrong hold.

A choreographic pair lift is defined as "a lift which enhances the choreography of the program and matches the music". It must be both ascending and ascending while the team moves across the ice, and must have a minimum of one rotation. It has no limitations in regards to the hold on entry or at any point during the lift. The lifting partner must have straight or almost straight arm(s) above their head at some point during the lift. The take off can be the same as another lift and does not invalidate the other lift.

Carry lifts are lifts with at least one continuous revolution of the man and are defined as "the simple carrying of a partner without rotation". All holds in carry lifts are unrestricted, and one partner can carry the other partner on their knees, shoulders, or back. They are not counted in the required number of overhead lifts. Pair teams can perform any number of carry holds they wish, but they have no value in their final scores. A difficult carry lift includes at least one of the following features: the man must skate on one foot; he must hold his partner on one arm; he must perform crossovers; and he must perform a spread eagle or a similar move.

The only times pair skating partner can give each other assistance in executing lifts are "through hand-to-hand, hand-to-arm, hand-to-body and hand to upper part of the leg (above the knee) grips" They are allowed changes of hold, or going from one of the grips to another, or from one hand to another in a one-hand hold, during lifts. Teams earn fewer points if the woman's position and a change of hold are executed at the same time. They earn more points if the execution of the woman's position and the change in hold are "significantly different from lift to lift". Lifts with more than one point of contact require "exceptional balance and control". (Note: See Tech Panel, p. 28, for images of lifts that contain a second point of contact with and without support.)

There are four types of holds in lifts: hand-to-armpit; hand-to-waist; hand-to-hip or the upper part of the leg, including the buttocks; and hand-to-hand/arm. There are three types of positions performed by the woman: upright, or when her upper body is vertical; the star, or when she faces sideways with her upper body parallel to the ice; and the platter, or when her position is flat and facing up or down with her upper body parallel to the ice. The lift ends when the man's arm or arms begin to bend after he completes a full extension, and when the woman begins to descend.

=== Twist lifts ===
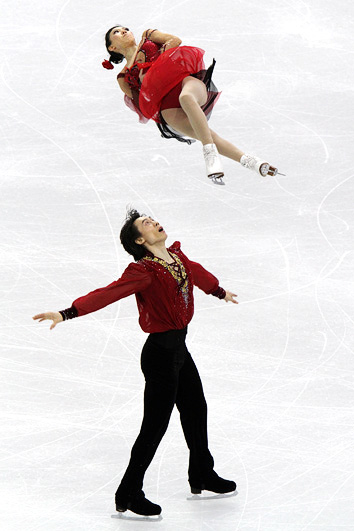
Tong Jian and Pang Qing from China perform a twist lift at the 2010 Olympics

Skate Canada calls twist lifts "sometimes the most thrilling and exciting component in pair skating". They can also be the most difficult movement to perform correctly. Judges look for the following when evaluating twist lifts: speed at entry and exit; whether or not the woman performs a split position while on her way to the top of the twist lift; her height once she gets there; clean rotations; a clean catch by the male (accomplished by placing both hands at the woman's waist and without any part of her upper body touching him); and a one-foot exit executed by both partners.

A pair team can make twist lifts more complicated when the woman executes a split position (each leg is at least 45° from her body axis and her legs are straight or almost straight) before rotating. They can also earn more points when the man's arms are sideways and straight or almost straight after he releases the woman, when he catches her at the side of her waist without the hands, arms, or any part of her body touching him, when his arms are above his head for at least one revolution while she is in the air. His arms can go to his side (straight or almost straight), and can reach at least shoulder level after he releases her. Difficult take-offs should be performed with continuous flow, and include turns, steps, movements, and small lifts executed before the take-off and before or immediately after the landing. If a twist lift lacks one-half a rotation or more on the landing, the element is considered a "cheated landing" and may be downgraded.

The first quadruple twist lift performed in international competition was by Russian pair team Marina Cherkasova and Sergei Shakhrai at the European Championship in 1977.

=== Jumps ===
Both pair skating partners must fulfill the same requirements for jump elements as single skaters do, and if the requirements are not fulfilled by both partners, they lose the same amount of points as single skaters. Pair teams, both juniors and seniors, must perform one solo jump during their short programs; it can include a double loop or double Axel for juniors, or any kind of double or triple jump for seniors. In the free skate, both juniors and seniors must perform only one solo jump and only one jump combination or sequence. A jump sequence consists of two jumps, with no limitations on the number of revolutions per jump. The second must be an Axel-type jump, "with a direct step from the landing curve of the first/second jump into the take-off curve of the Axel jump". A full revolution on the ice between the jumps, in which the free foot can touch the ice without a transfer of weight, is also allowed. During a jump combination, skaters must make sure that they land on the same foot they took off on, and that they execute a full rotation on the ice between the jumps. They can, however, execute an Euler jump between the two jumps, although in jump combinations and jump sequences, it is considered a non-listed jump and is not counted in the number of allowed jumps. In jump sequences, no change of foot is allowed after the execution of an Euler.

If a jump is missing one-quarter revolution, it is considered a "quarter" jump, and is called "under-rotated" if it is missing between one-quarter and one-half revolution. It is considered "downgraded" if it is missing over one-half a revolution and "over-rotated" if it has more than a one-quarter revolution, and the judges will classify it as a jump with a higher rotation. Downgraded jumps, which happen most often in jump combinations or sequences, also often have a "cheated take-off", meaning that skaters go into them incorrectly; for example, backwards for an Axel-type jump, which must be entered into forwards.

If the partners do not execute the same number of revolutions during a solo jump or as part of a jump sequence or combination, only the jump with the fewer revolutions will be counted in their score. Teams are allowed, however, to execute the same two jumps during a jump combination or sequence. If they perform any or both jump or jumps incorrectly, only the incorrectly done jump is not counted, and it is not considered a jump sequence or combination. Both partners can execute two solo jumps during their short programs, but the second jump is worth fewer points than the first.

A jump attempt, in which one or both partners execute a clear preparation for a take-off but step to the entry edge or place their skate's toe pick into the ice and leave the ice with or without a turn, counts as one jump element. If the partners execute an unequal number of rotations during a solo jump or as part of a jump combination or sequence, the jump with the lesser number of revolutions will be counted. They receive no points if they perform different types of jumps. A small hop or a jump with up to one-half revolution (considered "decoration") is not marked as a jump and called a "transition" instead. Non-listed jumps do not count as jumps, either, but can also be called a transition and can be used as "a special entrance to the jump".

If the partners execute a spin and a jump back-to-back, or vice versa, they are considered separate elements, and the team is awarded more points for executing a difficult take-off or entry. They lose points if the partners fall or step out of a jump during a jump sequence or combination. If one partner executes a jump combination while the other partner executes a jump sequence, the element will be considered a jump sequence.

=== Throw jumps ===
Throw jumps are "partner assisted jumps in which the Woman is thrown into the air by the Man on the take-off and lands without assistance from her partner on a backward outside edge". Many pair skaters consider the throw jump "a jump rather than a throw". The throw jump is also considered an assisted jump, performed by the woman. The man supports the woman, initiates her rotations, and assists her with her height, timing, and direction.

The types of throw jumps include: the throw Axel, the throw Salchow, the throw toe loop, the throw loop, the throw flip, and the throw Lutz. The speed of the team's entry into the throw jump, along with the number of rotations performed, increases the difficulty, as well as the height and/or distance they create. Pair teams must perform one throw jump during their short programs; senior teams can perform any double or triple throw jump, and junior teams must perform a double or triple toe loop or a double or triple flip/Lutz. If the throw jump does not satisfy the requirements as described by the ISU, including if it has the wrong number of revolutions, or if it is a repeat of a previous jump, it receives no value. Pair teams must include a maximum of two different throw jumps, with a different name and/or a different number of revolutions.

Throw jumps can be considered "cheated", under-rotated, and downgraded. Cheated jumps, also called "on the quarter", occur when the throw jump is missing a quarter of a rotation. Judges rely on camera angles to identify cheated jumps, especially when the jump is executed at the opposite end of the rink from the camera. The ISU states, "In all doubtful cases the Technical Panel should act to the benefit of the skater". A throw jump is considered under-rotated when it is missing over one-half a revolution, but not over one-half a revolution. A throw jump is downgraded if it has a missing rotation of one-half a revolution or more.

The throw triple Axel is a difficult throw to accomplish because the woman must perform three-and-one-half revolutions after being thrown by the man, a half-revolution more than other triple jumps, and because it requires a forward take-off. The first throw triple Axel jump performed in competition was by American pair team Rena Inoue and John Baldwin Jr. at the 2006 U.S. Championships. They also performed it at the 2006 Winter Olympics. The first quadruple throw loop jump was accomplished by American pair team Tiffany Vise and Derek Trent at the 2007 Trophee Eric Bompard.

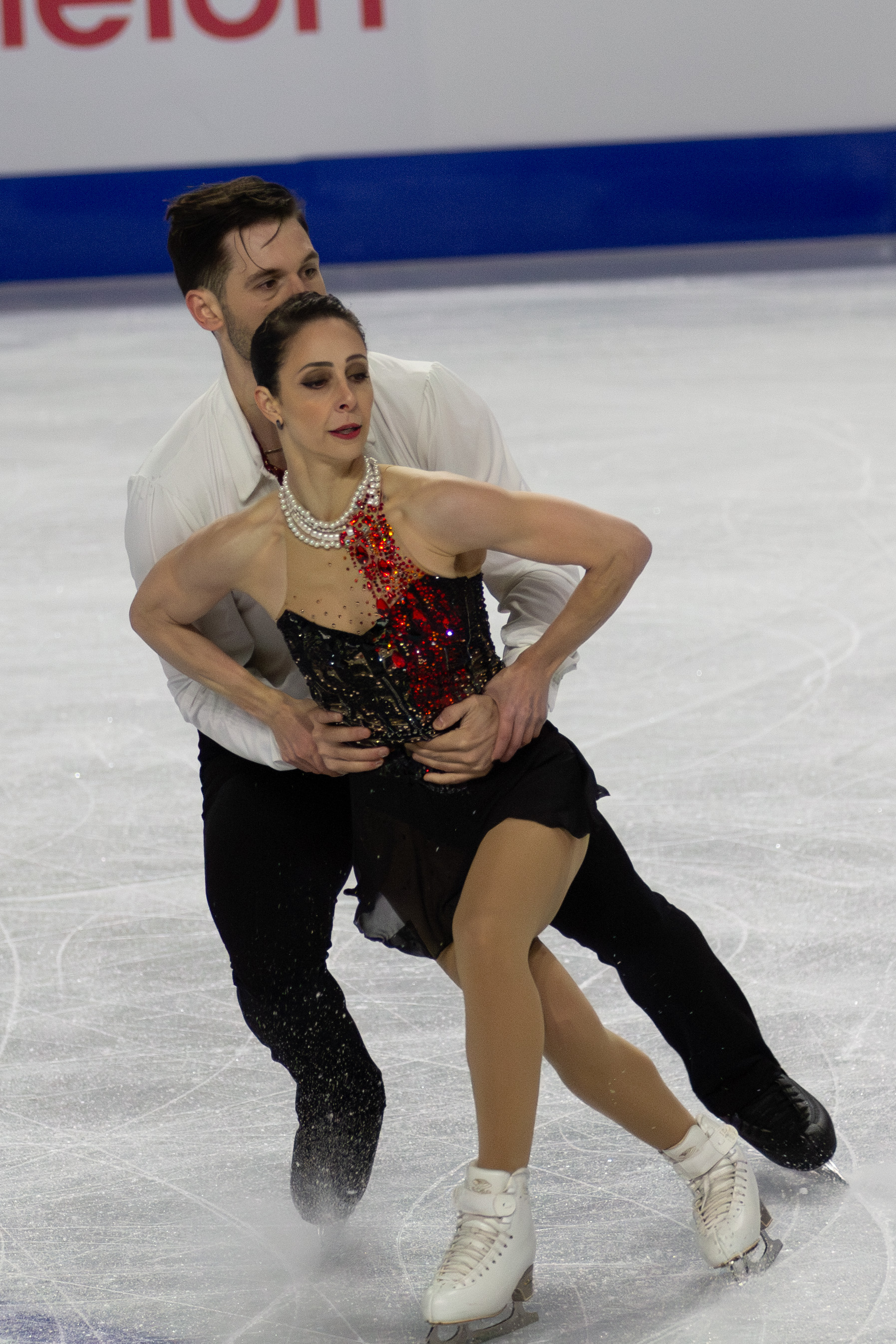
Deanna Stellato-Dudek & Maxime Deschamps set up for a throw jump.

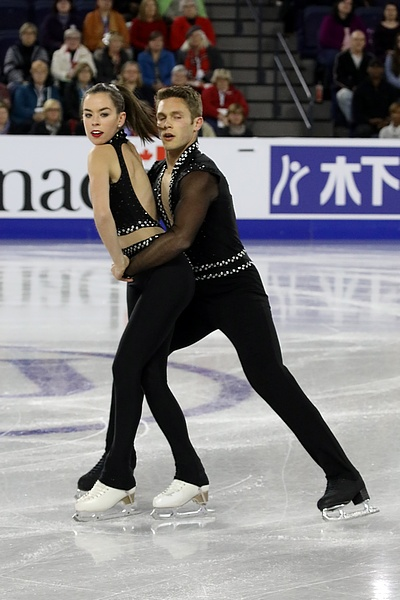
Evelyn Walsh & Trennt Michaud set up for a throw jump.

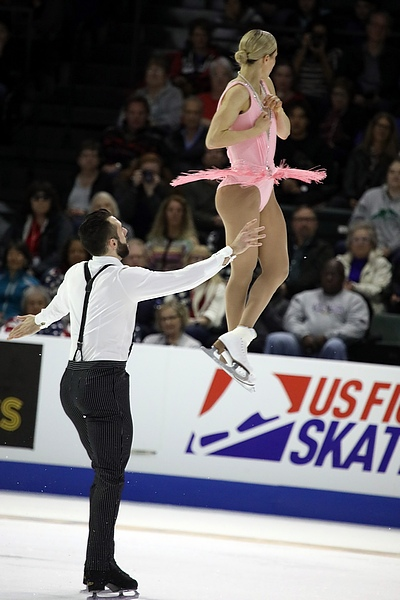
Ashley Cain rotates after being thrown by Timothy LeDuc.

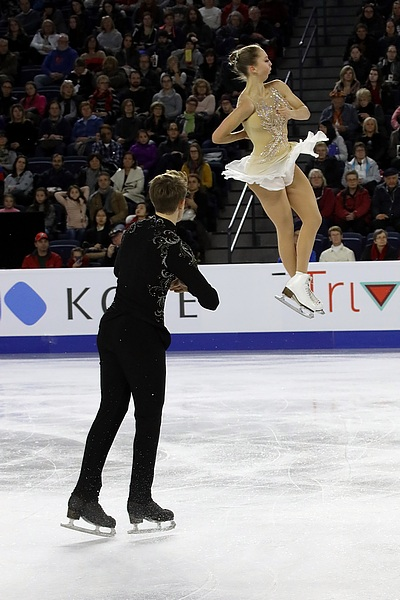
Aleksandra Boikova rotates after being thrown by Dmitrii Kozlovskii.

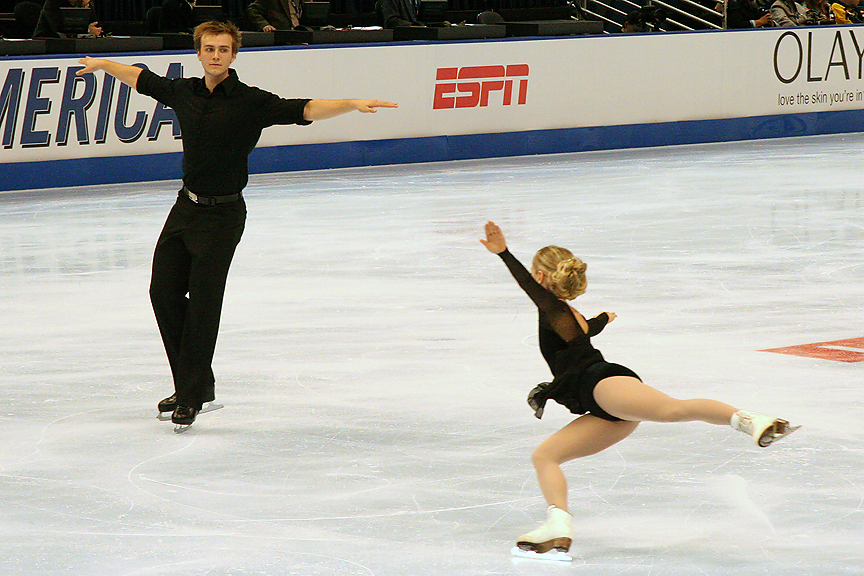
Anabelle Langlois lands after performing a throw jump with Cody Hay.

=== Spins ===
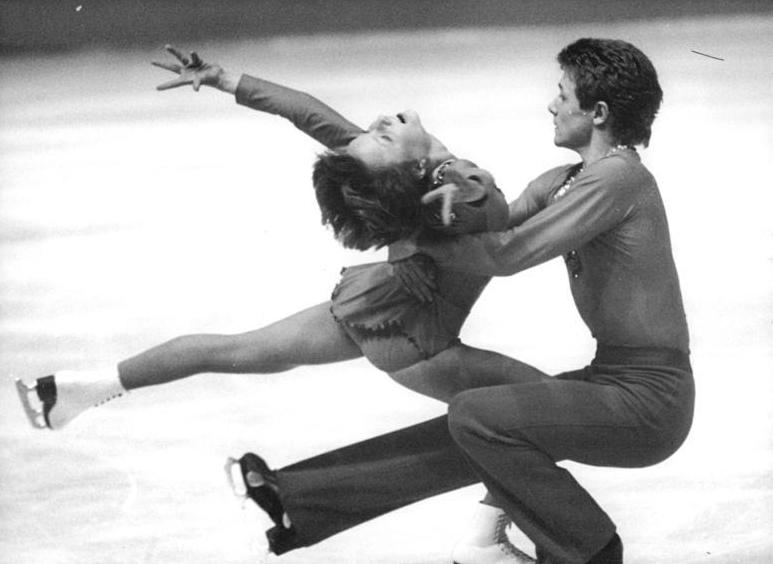
East German pair skaters Sabine Baeß and Tassilo Thierbach performing a pair spin, 1979

==== Solo spin combinations ====
The solo spin combination must be performed once during the short program of pair skating competitions, with at least two revolutions in two basic positions. Both partners must include all three basic positions in order to earn the full points possible. There must be a minimum of five revolutions made on each foot. Spins can be commenced with jumps and must have at least two different basic positions, and both partners must include two revolutions in each position. A solo spin combination must have all three basic positions (the camel spin, the sit spin, and upright positions) performed by both partners, at any time during the spin to receive the full value of points, and must have all three basic positions performed by both partners to receive full value for the element. A spin with less than three revolutions is not counted as a spin; rather, it is considered a skating movement. If a skater changes to a non-basic position, (Note: A non-basic position is defined as "all the other positions not fulfilling the requirements of any basic positions".) it is not considered a change of position. The number of revolutions in non-basic positions, which may be considered difficult variations, is counted towards the team's total number of revolutions. Only positions, whether basic or non-basic, must be performed by the partners at the same time.

If a skater falls while entering into the spin, they can perform another spin or spinning movement immediately after the fall, to fill the time lost from the fall, but it is not counted as a solo spin combination. A change of foot, in the form of a jump or step over, is allowed, and the change of position and change of foot can be performed separately or at the same time.

==== Spin combinations ====
Both junior and senior pair teams must perform one pair spin combination, which may begin with a fly spin, during their free skating programs. Pair spin combinations must have at least eight revolutions; the minimum number of required revolutions "must be counted from the entry of the spin until its exit". Spins must have at least two different basic positions, with two revolutions in each position performed by both partners anywhere within the spin; full value for pair spin combinations is awarded only when both partners perform all three basic positions.

A spin executed in both clockwise and counterclockwise directions is considered one spin. Pair teams receive more points if the spin contains three difficult variations, two of which can be non-basic positions, although each partner must have at least one difficult variation. The spin can also begin with a fly spin; they earn more points if one or both partners perform a difficult entrance or any fly entrance. They also earn more points if they perform a difficult exit. If one or both partners fall while entering a spin, they can execute a spin or a spinning movement to fill up the time lost during the fall.

=== Death spirals ===
Keauna McLaughlin and Rockne Brubaker perform a death spiral during the 2008 U.S. Figure Skating Championships

The death spiral is a circular move in pair skating, in which the male partner lowers the female partner while she arches backward towards the ice while gliding on one foot and as she holds his hand "while he rotates her in a circle with her head almost touching the ice surface". It was created by German professional skater Charlotte Oelschlägel and her husband Curt Neumann in the 1920s. Suzanne Morrow and Wallace Diestelmeyer from Canada were the first pair team to perform the death spiral one-handed (the man holding the woman in position with one hand), at the 1948 Olympic Games.

There are four types of death spirals: the backward outside, the forward inside, the backward inside, and the forward outside. The forward inside death spiral is the easiest death spiral, and the forward outside death spiral is the most difficult. The ISU describes the requirements that pair skating teams must follow when executing death spirals, and allows for variations of arm holds and pivot positions.

=== Step sequences ===
A step sequence is a required element in all four disciplines of figure skating, and has been defined as "steps and turns in a pattern on the ice". Skaters earn the most points in step sequences by performing steps and movements with "flair and personality", by turning in both directions, by using one foot and then the other, and by including up and down movements. Step sequences in pair skating should be performed "together or close together", and must be "executed according to the character of the music". Step sequences must be a part of the short program, but there is no step sequence in the free skating program. There is no required pattern, but pair teams must fully use the ice surface. The step sequence must be "visible and identifiable", and teams must use the full ice surface (oval, circle, straight line, serpentine, or similar shape).

The workload between the partners must be even to help them earn more points. More points are rewarded to teams when they change places or holds, or when they perform difficult skating moves together. Both partners must execute the combinations of difficult turns at the same time and with a clear rhythm and continuous flow. Partners can perform rockers, counters, brackets, loops, and twizzles during combinations of difficult turns. Three turns, changes of edges, jumps and/or hops, and changes of feet are not allowed, and "at least one turn in the combination must be of a different type than the others".

== Rules and regulations ==
Skaters must only execute the prescribed elements; if they do not, the extra or unprescribed elements will not be counted in their score. Only the first attempt of an element will be included. Violations in pair skating include falls, time, music, and clothing.

=== Falls and interruptions ===
According to the ISU, a fall is defined as the "loss of control by a Skater with the result that the majority of his/her own body weight is on the ice supported by any other part of the body other than the blades; e.g. hand(s), knee(s), back, buttock(s) or any part of the arm". For pair skaters, one point is deducted for every fall by one partner, and two points are deducted for every fall by both partners. If the woman loses the edge of her skate during a death spiral, and "goes to the boot or knee", the spiral is considered ended and may be called a fall. According to former American figure skater Katrina Hacker, falls associated with jumps occur for the following reasons: the skater makes an error during their takeoff; their jump is under-rotated, or not fully rotated while they are in the air; they execute a tilted jump and is unable to land upright on their feet; and they make an error during the first jump of a combination jump, resulting in not having enough smoothness, speed, and flow to complete the second jump.

The ISU defines an interruption as "the period of time starting immediately when the Competitor stops performing the program or is ordered to do so by the Referee, whichever is earlier, and ending when the Competitor resumes his performance". If there is an interruption while performing their program, skaters can lose one point if it lasts more than 10 seconds but not over 20 seconds. They can lose two points if the interruption lasts 20 seconds but not over 30 seconds, and three points if it lasts 30 seconds but not more than 40 seconds. They can lose five points if they do not resume their program within three minutes of the interruption beginning. They can also lose five points if the interruption is caused by an "adverse condition" up to three minutes before the start of their program.

An interruption can also be caused by an "adverse condition", which is unrelated to the skaters and/or their equipment, such as lighting, ice conditions, items thrown onto the ice, etc. If an adverse condition occurs, the skaters may stop and report it to the referee as soon as they become aware of the problem. They must also stop skating when the referee signals them to do so. Adverse conditions related to competitors and their equipment that occur during their programs include injuries. Other adverse conditions related to them or their equipment include, but are not limited to, their laces coming undone or damage to their clothing or skates. At that point, competitors must stop when they are warned by the referee or when they become aware of the problem, whichever comes first.

When the problem is solved, skaters can continue from the point at which the interruption occurred, or if it occurred at the entrance to or during an element, immediately before the element. If the interruption caused by an adverse condition lasts over ten minutes, a second warm-up takes place. After the warm-up, the skaters must continue their program from the point at which it was interrupted, or if the interruption occurred at the entrance to or during the element, immediately before the element. No deductions are applied for interruptions unrelated to the competitors or their equipment.

=== Time ===
The ISU states that the time a program begins "must be reckoned" from the moment the skater begins to move or skate until they come to a complete stop at the end of their program. As for all skating disciplines, judges penalize pair skaters one point up to every five seconds for ending their programs too early or too late. If they start their programs between one and 30 seconds late, they can lose one point. Restrictions for finishing the short program and the free skating program are similar to the requirements of the other disciplines in figure skating. Pair teams can complete these programs within plus or minus 10 seconds of the required times; if they cannot, judges can deduct points if they finish up to five seconds too early or too late. If they begin skating any element after their required time (plus the required 10 seconds they have to begin), they earn no points for those elements. The pair team receives no points if the duration of their program is completed less than 30 seconds or more seconds early.

=== Music ===
All programs in all disciplines must be skated to music of the competitor's choosing. The use of vocals was expanded to pair skating, as well as to single skating, starting in 2014; the first Olympics affected by this change was in 2018 in PyeongChang, South Korea. (Note: The ISU has allowed vocals in the music used in ice dance since the 1997–1998 season.) The ISU's decision, done to increase the sport's audience, to encourage more participation, and to give skaters and choreographers more choice in constructing their programs, had divided support among skaters, coaches, and choreographers.

If the quality or tempo of the music the team uses in their program is deficient, or if there is a stop or interruption in their music, no matter the reason, they must stop skating when they become aware of the problem or when signaled to stop by a skating official, whichever occurs first. If any problems with the music occur within 20 seconds of the program beginning, the team can choose to either restart the program or continue from the point where they stopped performing. If they decide to continue from where they left off, they will continue to be judged from that point onward, as well as on their performance up to that point. If they decide to restart their program, they are judged from the beginning of their restart, and what they did previously must be disregarded. If the music interruption occurs more than 20 seconds after they have begun their program, or if it occurs during an element or at the entrance of an element, they must resume their program from the point of the interruption. If the element was identified before the interruption, it must be removed from the list of performed elements, and the team may repeat it when they resume their program. No deductions are counted for interruptions due to music deficiencies.

=== Clothing ===
As for the other disciplines of figure skating, the clothing worn by pair skaters at ISU Championships, the Olympics, and international competitions must be "modest, dignified and appropriate for athletic competition—not garish or theatrical in design". Props and accessories are not allowed. Clothing can reflect the character of the skaters' chosen music and must not "give the effect of excessive nudity inappropriate for the discipline". All men must wear full-length trousers, a rule that has been in effect since the 1994–1995 season. Since 2003, women skaters have been able to wear skirts, trousers, tights, and unitards. Decorations on costumes must be "non-detachable"; judges can deduct one point per program if part of the competitors' costumes or decorations fall on the ice.

Clothing that does not adhere to these guidelines will be penalized by a deduction. If competitors do not adhere to these guidelines, the judges can deduct points from their total score. However, costume deductions are rare. Juliet Newcomer from U.S. Figure Skating states that by the time skaters get to a national or world championship, they have received enough feedback about their costumes and are no longer willing to take any more risks of losing points. As former competitive skater and designer Braden Overett told the New York Post, there is "an informal review process before major competitions such as the Olympics, during which judges communicate their preferences".

Also according to the New York Post, one of the goals of skaters and designers is to ensure that a costume's design, which can "make or break a performance", does not affect the skaters' scores. Designers collaborate with skaters and their coaches to help them design costumes that fit the themes and requirements of their programs for months before the start of each season. There have been calls to require figure skaters to wear uniforms like other competitive sports, in order to make the sport less expensive and more inclusive, and to emphasize its athletic side.

== Injuries ==
Australian single skater and coach Belinda Noonan states that "Pairs skating is literally physically more dangerous than the other three disciplines". American pair skater Nathan Bartholomay agrees, comparing the danger in pair skating to playing in the National Football League. Sportswriter Sandra Loosemore, in her discussion of the accidents in all figure skating disciplines, states that the "very nature" of pair skating "adds an extra dimension of danger and risk of injury" because of the high speed and close proximity pair teams skate to each other, and the lifts and other elements in pair skating. Both members of a pair skating team can receive broken noses and other injuries from performing twist lifts incorrectly, and although male partners are taught to protect their partners in case of a fall from an overhead lift, concussions and serious head injuries are common. The ISU has banned and restricted dangerous tricks and moves from pair skating, but both skating audiences and skaters have demanded them. Skaters have resisted using protective gear, even during practice, because it interferes with developing self-confidence and is seen as incompatible with "the aesthetic aspects of the sport".

A study conducted during a U.S. national competition including 60 pair skaters recorded an average of 1.83 injuries per athlete, the most of any figure skating discipline. Single skaters and ice dancers have more lower body injuries, but pair skaters suffer more upper body injuries, "with 50% occurring to the head (e.g., facial lacerations, concussions)". According to figure skating researchers Jason Vescovi and Jaci VanHeest, these injuries are "an obvious consequence of the throws and side-by-side jumps performed in this discipline". A study conducted in 1989 found that ice dancers and pair skaters, during a nine-month period of time, can experience serious injuries (defined as the athletes missing seven or more consecutive days of training after their injuries), and that women pair skaters have more injuries than men, which Vescovi and VanHeest attributed to the demands of pair skating.

== Works cited ==
- Hines, James R. (2006). Figure Skating: A History. Urbana, Illinois: University of Illinois Press. ISBN 978-0-252-07286-4.
- Hines, James R. (2011). Historical Dictionary of Figure Skating. Lanham, Maryland: Scarecrow Press. ISBN 978-0-8108-6859-5.
- "ISU Communication 2788: Single & Pair Skating" (PDF). Lausanne, Switzerland: International Skating Union. 19 March 2026. Archived (PDF) from the original on 24 June 2026.
- Kestnbaum, Ellyn (2003). Culture on Ice: Figure Skating and Cultural Meaning. Middletown, Connecticut: Wesleyan University Press. ISBN 0819566411.
- Silby, Caroline (2018). "Mental Skills Training". In Vescovi, Jason D.; VanHeest, Jaci L. (eds.). The Science of Figure Skating. New York: Routledge. pp. 85–97. ISBN 978-1-138-22986-0.
- "Special Regulations & Technical Rules – Single & Pair Skating and Ice Dance 2024" (PDF). International Skating Union. Archived (PDF) from the original on 9 November 2024.
- "Technical Panel Handbook: Pair Skating 2025-2026" (PDF). International Skating Union. 25 July 2025. Archived (PDF) from the original on 14 December 2025.
