= Special figures =

Former element in a figure skating competition

Illustration of selection of special figures

Illustration of selection of special figures

Special figures were a component of figure skating in the late 19th and early 20th centuries. Like compulsory figures, special figures involved tracing patterns on the ice with the blade of one ice skate. This required the skater to display significant balance and control while skating on one foot.

While compulsory figures were standard patterns derived from the figure 8, the special figures were elaborate patterns of the skaters' own invention. These designs included rosettes, stars, crosses, and other elaborate curlicues. The building blocks for special figures included not only the elements of the standard compulsory figures, but shapes known as beaks, spectacles, and cross-cuts.

Tracing of elaborate patterns on the ice was a characteristic of the American and British schools of figure skating. By the early 20th century, this had been largely displaced by the "International Style" of free skating which utilized the entire ice surface and featured more athletic movements set to music.

Special figures were first performed at the first international figure skating competition in Vienna in 1882, when Theodor Langer traced a filigree design of a symmetrical four-point star. According to figure skating historian and writer Ellyn Kestnbaum, the body movements required to execute the design were unpleasant to watch, jerky, and did not use the flow of the blade across the ice, but the pattern Langer traced across the ice was aesthetically pleasing and demonstrated a great deal of skill and control. Langer inspired other skaters to develop their own special figures, which became an important part of figure skating in the rest of the 19th century and into the 1940s.

Special figures was an event in the 1908 Summer Olympic Games. Nikolai Panin of Russia won the event.

Special figures have had a modern renaissance with the founding of the World Figure Sport Society in 2015 and the World Figure & Fancy Skating Championships & Festival on black ice. Special figures are now being competed at the World Figure & Fancy Skating Championships by skating artists including the Maltese Cross, the Swiss S, the Winged Diamond Cross-cut, Swedish Cross-cuts, and many others.

The World Figure & Fancy Skating Championships' name was inspired by the 1895 book Figure and Fancy Skating by George A. Meagher.

== Sources ==
- The Official Book of Figure Skating. ISBN 0-684-84673-X.
- Irving Brokaw: The Art of Skating. American Sports Publishing Co., 1928.
- Benjamin Wright: Skating in America. United States Figure Skating Association, 1996.
- George A. Meagher: Figure and Fancy Skating. Bliss, Sands, and Foster, 1895. ISBN 978-0-598-48290-7.
- Montagu S. Monier-Williams: Figure-Skating. A. D. Innes & Company, London, 1898.
- Louise Vacca Dawe: Patterns on Black Ice: The Art and Sport of Figure Skating, Independently Published, 2019. ISBN 179821332X
