= List of figure skaters (men's singles) =

The following is a list of notable figure skaters who have competed in men's singles. These are skaters who have won a gold, silver, or bronze medal at at least one of the following competitions: the Winter Olympics, the World Figure Skating Championships, the European Figure Skating Championships, the Four Continents Figure Skating Championships, the Grand Prix of Figure Skating Final, the Winter Youth Olympics, the World Junior Figure Skating Championships, or the Junior Grand Prix Final; or who have won a gold medal at their national championships.

== A ==
Skater	Nation	Major championships	Ref.
Max Aaron	United States	(gold) U.S. Championships (2013)	
Giordano Abbondati	Italy	(gold) Italian Championships (1961–66, 1968)	
Jeremy Abbott	United States	(gold) Grand Prix Final (2008); U.S. Championships (2009–10, 2012, 2014)	
Jeremy Abbott	United States	(bronze) Winter Olympics (2014); Four Continents Championships (2007, 2011)	
Alexander Abt	Soviet Union	(silver) World Junior Championships (1991)	
Alexander Abt	Russia	(gold) Russian Championships (2003)	
Alexander Abt	Russia	(silver) European Championships (2002)	
Alexander Abt	Russia	(bronze) European Championships (1998)	
Dmitri Aliev	Russia	(gold) European Championships (2020); Russian Championships (2020); Winter Youth Olympics (2016); Junior Grand Prix Final (2016)	
Dmitri Aliev	Russia	(silver) European Championships (2018); World Junior Championships (2017); Junior Grand Prix Final (2015)	
Dmitri Aliev	Russia	(bronze) Winter Youth Olympics (2016)	
Damon Allen	United States	(bronze) World Junior Championships (1992)	
Scott Allen	United States	(gold) U.S. Championships (1964, 1966)	
Scott Allen	United States	(silver) World Championships (1965)	
Scott Allen	United States	(bronze) Winter Olympics (1964)	
Laurent Alvarez	Switzerland	(gold) Swiss Championships (2012)	
Herbert Alward	Austria	(bronze) World Championships (1938); European Championships (1938)	
Saulius Ambrulevičius	Lithuania	(gold) Lithuanian Championships (2007–13)	
Florent Amodio	France	(gold) European Championships (2011); French Championships (2010, 2013–15); Junior Grand Prix Final (2008)	
Florent Amodio	France	(silver) European Championships (2013)	
Florent Amodio	France	(bronze) European Championships (2012)	
Günter Anderl	Austria	(gold) Austrian Championships (1969–71)	
Fedor Andreev	Canada	(bronze) Junior Grand Prix Final (1999)	
Arthur Apfel	Great Britain	(gold) British Championships (1947)	
Arthur Apfel	Great Britain	(bronze) World Championships (1947)	
Edward Appleby	Great Britain	(gold) British Championships (2024–26)	
Engin Ali Artan	Turkey	(gold) Turkish Championships (2015–17)	
Kévin Aymoz	France	(gold) French Championships (2017, 2019–22, 2025-26)	
Kévin Aymoz	France	(bronze) Grand Prix Final (2019)	

== B ==
Skater	Nation	Major championships	Ref.
Sherwin Badger	United States	(gold) U.S. Championships (1920–24)	
Ernst Baier	Germany	(gold) German Championships (1933–38)	
Ernst Baier	Germany	(silver) Winter Olympics (1936); World Championships (1933–34); European Championships (1931–33)	
Ernst Baier	Germany	(bronze) World Championships (1931–32); European Championships (1935–36)	
John Baldwin	United States	(bronze) World Junior Championships (1990)	
Stefano Bargauan	Italy	(gold) Italian Championships (1969–73)	
Petr Barna	Czechoslovakia	(gold) European Championships (1992); Czechoslovak Championships (1985, 1987–92)	
Petr Barna	Czechoslovakia	(silver) European Championships (1990–91)	
Petr Barna	Czechoslovakia	(bronze) Winter Olympics (1992); European Championships (1989)	
Bobby Beauchamp	United States	(silver) World Junior Championships (1979)	
Daniel Béland	Canada	(gold) World Junior Championships (1977)	
Jiří Bělohradský	Czech Republic	(gold) Czech Championships (2017–18, 2021)	
Matyáš Bělohradský	Czech Republic	(gold) Czech Championships (2019, 2022)	
Kristoffer Berntsson	Sweden	(gold) Swedish Championships (2000–01, 2004–05, 2007–11)	
Chafik Besseghier	France	(gold) French Championships (2016, 2018)	
Tomislav Bišćan	Croatia	(gold) Croatian Championships (2002–03)	
Igor Bobrin	Soviet Union	(gold) European Championships (1981); Soviet Championships (1978, 1980–82)	
Igor Bobrin	Soviet Union	(bronze) World Championships (1981); European Championships (1982)	
Willy Böckl	Austria	(gold) World Championships (1925–28); European Championships (1922–23, 1925–28); Austrian Championships (1913–14, 1920, 1924)	
Willy Böckl	Austria	(silver) Winter Olympics (1924, 1928); World Championships (1913, 1923–24)	
Willy Böckl	Austria	(bronze) World Championships (1914, 1922); European Championships (1913–14)	
Max Bohatsch	Austria	(gold) European Championships (1905); Austrian Championships (1901, 1904–05)	
Max Bohatsch	Austria	(silver) World Championships (1905, 1907); European Championships (1904)	
Max Bohatsch	Austria	(bronze) World Championships (1903)	
Brian Boitano	United States	(gold) Winter Olympics (1988); World Championships (1986, 1988); U.S. Championships (1985–88)	
Brian Boitano	United States	(silver) World Championships (1987)	
Brian Boitano	United States	(bronze) World Championships (1985); World Junior Championships (1978)	
Michael Booker	Great Britain	(gold) British Championships (1953–58)	
Michael Booker	Great Britain	(silver) European Championships (1955–56)	
Michael Booker	Great Britain	(bronze) European Championships (1957)	
Naiden Borichev	Bulgaria	(gold) Bulgarian Championships (2007–08)	
Artem Borodulin	Russia	(silver) World Junior Championships (2008)	
Norris Bowden	Canada	(gold) Canadian Championships (1947)	
Christopher Bowman	United States	(gold) U.S. Championships (1989, 1992); World Junior Championships (1983)	
Christopher Bowman	United States	(silver) World Championships (1989)	
Christopher Bowman	United States	(bronze) World Championships (1990)	
Ryan Bradley	United States	(gold) U.S. Championships (2011)	
Rolando Bragaglia	Italy	(gold) Italian Championships (1974, 1976)	
Jordan Brauninger	United States	(bronze) World Junior Championships (2004)	
Michal Březina	Czech Republic	(gold) Czech Championships (2010, 2015–16, 2020)	
Michal Březina	Czech Republic	(silver) World Junior Championships (2009)	
Michal Březina	Czech Republic	(bronze) European Championships (2013)	
Lukas Britschgi	Switzerland	(gold) European Championships (2025); Swiss Championships (2019–20, 2022, 2024–26)	
Lukas Britschgi	Switzerland	(bronze) European Championships (2023)	
Sébastien Britten	Canada	(gold) Canadian Championships (1995)	
Lucas Broussard	United States	(silver) Junior Grand Prix Final (2022)	
Jason Brown	United States	(gold) U.S. Championships (2015); Junior Grand Prix Final (2011)	
Jason Brown	United States	(silver) Four Continents Championships (2020); World Junior Championships (2013)	
Jason Brown	United States	(bronze) Winter Olympics (2014); Four Continents Championships (2018); World Junior Championships (2012)	
Tim Brown	United States	(silver) World Championships (1957–58)	
Tim Brown	United States	(bronze) World Championships (1959)	
Kurt Browning	Canada	(gold) World Championships (1989–91, 1993); Canadian Championships (1989–91, 1993)	
Kurt Browning	Canada	(silver) World Championships (1992)	
Clemens Brummer	Germany	(gold) German Championships (2008)	
Pierre Brunet	France	(gold) French Championships (1924–31)	
Lucian Büeler	Switzerland	(gold) Swiss Championships (1935–37)	
Yuri Bureiko	Soviet Union	(silver) World Junior Championships (1981)	
Heinrich Burger	Germany	(gold) German Championships (1904, 1906–07)	
Heinrich Burger	Germany	(silver) World Championships (1904, 1906); European Championships (1905)	
Heinrich Burger	Germany	(bronze) World Championships (1908)	
Ralph Burghart	Austria	(gold) Austrian Championships (1985, 1987–92)	
Jeffrey Buttle	Canada	(gold) World Championships (2008); Four Continents Championships (2002, 2004); Canadian Championships (2005–07)	
Jeffrey Buttle	Canada	(silver) World Championships (2005); Four Continents Championships (2007–08); Grand Prix Final (2004–05)	
Jeffrey Buttle	Canada	(bronze) Winter Olympics (2006)	
Dick Button	United States	(gold) Winter Olympics (1948, 1952); World Championships (1948–52); European Championships (1948); U.S. Championships (1946–52)	
Dick Button	United States	(silver) World Championships (1947)	
Alexei Bychenko	Israel	(gold) Israeli Championships (2016–18)	
Alexei Bychenko	Israel	(silver) European Championships (2016)	

== C ==
Skater	Nation	Major championships	Ref.
Alain Calmat	France	(gold) World Championships (1965); European Championships (1962–64); French Championships (1958, 1962–65)	
Alain Calmat	France	(silver) Winter Olympics (1964); World Championships (1963–64); European Championships (1961, 1965)	
Alain Calmat	France	(bronze) World Championships (1960, 1962); European Championships (1958)	
Philippe Candeloro	France	(gold) French Championships (1994–97)	
Philippe Candeloro	France	(silver) World Championships (1994); European Championships (1993, 1997)	
Philippe Candeloro	France	(bronze) Winter Olympics (1994, 1998); World Championships (1995)	
Vladislav Čáp	Czechoslovakia	(gold) Czechoslovak Championships (1948-49)	
Vladislav Čáp	Czechoslovakia	(silver) European Championships (1947)	
Sean Carlow	Australia	(gold) Australian Championships (2006–08)	
Stephen Carr	Australia	(gold) Australian Championships (1991–94)	
Donovan Carrillo	Mexico	(gold) Mexican Championships (2018–20, 2022–25)	
Michael Carrington	Great Britain	(gold) British Championships (1950-51)	
Michael Carrington	Great Britain	(bronze) European Championships (1952)	
Stephen Carriere	United States	(gold) World Junior Championships (2007); Junior Grand Prix Final (2006)	
Marc Casal	Andorra	(gold) Andorran Championships (2004)	
Jan Čejvan	Slovenia	(gold) Slovenian Championships (1993–2000)	
Thierry Cerez	France	(gold) French Championships (1998)	
Thierry Cerez	France	(silver) World Junior Championships (1995)	
Rudi Cerne	West Germany	(gold) German Championships (1978, 1980)	
Rudi Cerne	West Germany	(silver) European Championships (1984)	
Cha Jun-hwan	South Korea	(gold) Four Continents Championships (2022); South Korean Championships (2017–26)	
Cha Jun-hwan	South Korea	(silver) World Championships (2023); Four Continents Championships (2025)	
Cha Jun-hwan	South Korea	(bronze) Four Continents Championships (2024); Grand Prix Final (2018); Junior Grand Prix Final (2016)	
Patrick Chan	Canada	(gold) Winter Olympics (2018); World Championships (2011–13); Four Continents Championships (2009, 2012, 2016); Grand Prix Final (2010–11); Canadian Championships (2008–14, 2016–18)	
Patrick Chan	Canada	(silver) Winter Olympics (2014); World Championships (2009–10); Grand Prix Final (2013); World Junior Championships (2007)	
Patrick Chan	Canada	(bronze) Grand Prix Final (2012)	
Andy Chen	Chinese Taipei	(gold) Chinese Taipei Championships (2005)	
Nathan Chen	United States	(gold) Winter Olympics (2022); World Championships (2018–19, 2021); Four Continents Championships (2017); Grand Prix Final (2017–19); U.S. Championships (2017–22); Junior Grand Prix Final (2015)	
Nathan Chen	United States	(silver) Grand Prix Final (2016)	
Nathan Chen	United States	(bronze) Winter Olympics (2018); World Junior Championships (2014); Junior Grand Prix Final (2013)	
Sergei Chetverukhin	Soviet Union	(gold) Soviet Championships (1967–71, 1973)	
Sergei Chetverukhin	Soviet Union	(silver) Winter Olympics (1972); World Championships (1972–73); European Championships (1971–73)	
Sergei Chetverukhin	Soviet Union	(bronze) World Championships (1971); European Championships (1969)	
Gheorghe Chiper	Romania	(gold) Romanian Championships (1999–2006)	
Wesley Chiu	Canada	(gold) Canadian Championships (2024)	
Edward Ka-yin Chow	Hong Kong	(gold) Hong Kong Championships (2003, 2005–06)	
Chris Christenson	United States	(gold) U.S. Championships (1926)	
Michael Chrolenko	Norway	(gold) Norwegian Championships (2006–07)	
Shepherd Clark	United States	(silver) World Junior Championships (1989)	
Maciej Cieplucha	Poland	(gold) Polish Championships (2010, 2012, 2014)	
Mark Cockerell	United States	(gold) World Junior Championships (1976)	
Ricky Cockerill	New Zealand	(gold) New Zealand Championships (1999–2005)	
Dennis Coi	Canada	(gold) World Junior Championships (1978)	
Osborne Colson	Canada	(gold) Canadian Championships (1936–37)	
Samuel Contesti	Italy	(gold) Italian Championships (2008–12)	
Samuel Contesti	Italy	(silver) European Championships (2009)	
Humberto Contreras	Mexico	(gold) Mexican Championships (2002–03, 2006, 2010)	
Robin Cousins	Great Britain	(gold) Winter Olympics (1980); European Championships (1980); British Championships (1977–80)	
Robin Cousins	Great Britain	(silver) World Championships (1979–80)	
Robin Cousins	Great Britain	(bronze) World Championships (1978); European Championships (1977–79)	
Toller Cranston	Canada	(gold) Canadian Championships (1971–76)	
Toller Cranston	Canada	(bronze) Winter Olympics (1976); World Championships (1974)	
John Curry	Great Britain	(gold) Winter Olympics (1976); World Championships (1976); European Championships (1976); British Championships (1971, 1973–76)	
John Curry	Great Britain	(silver) European Championships (1975)	
John Curry	Great Britain	(bronze) World Championships (1975); European Championships (1974)	
György Czakó	Hungary	(gold) Hungarian Championships (1951–52, 1954)	

== D ==
Skater	Nation	Major championships	Ref.
Artur Danielian	Russia	(silver) European Championships (2020); World Junior Championships (2018)	
Semen Daniliants	Armenia	(gold) Armenian Championships (2025-26)	
Vitaliy Danylchenko	Ukraine	(gold) Ukrainian Championships (1999–2000, 2002–05)	
Emmerich Danzer	Austria	(gold) World Championships (1966–68); European Championships (1965–68); Austrian Championships (1965–68)	
Emmerich Danzer	Austria	(bronze) European Championships (1963)	
Matthew Davies	Great Britain	(gold) British Championships (2002, 2004)	
Scott Davis	United States	(gold) U.S. Championships (1993–94)	
Sergei Davydov	Russia	(silver) World Junior Championships (1998)	
Sergei Davydov	Belarus	(gold) Belarusian Championships (2001–08)	
Marcus Deen	Netherlands	(gold) Dutch Championships (1991, 1993–97)	
Bruno Delmaestro	Italy	(gold) Italian Championships (1981–83)	
Derrick Delmore	United States	(gold) World Junior Championships (1998)	
Burak Demirboğa	Turkey	(gold) Turkish Championships (2018–24)	
Laurent Depouilly	France	(gold) French Championships (1986)	
Wallace Diestelmeyer	Canada	(gold) Canadian Championships (1948)	
Ivan Dinev	Bulgaria	(gold) Bulgarian Championships (1992-2006)	
Ivan Dinev	Bulgaria	(silver) Junior Grand Prix Final (1997)	
Hugo Distler	Austria	(silver) European Championships (1927)	
Hugo Distler	Austria	(bronze) World Championships (1928); European Championships (1931)	
Karol Divín	Czechoslovakia	(gold) European Championships (1958–59); Czechoslovak Championships (1954–64)	
Karol Divín	Czechoslovakia	(silver) Winter Olympics (1960); World Championships (1962); European Championships (1957, 1962)	
Karol Divín	Czechoslovakia	(bronze) World Championships (1964); European Championships (1954–56, 1964)	
Dmytro Dmytrenko	Soviet Union	(gold) World Junior Championships (1992)	
Dmytro Dmytrenko	Ukraine	(gold) European Championships (1993); Ukrainian Championships (1993, 2001)	
Dmytro Dmytrenko	Ukraine	(bronze) European Championships (2000)	
Sergei Dobrin	Russia	(silver) Junior Grand Prix Final (2000, 2002)	
Sergei Dobrin	Russia	(bronze) World Junior Championships (2005)	
Andrei Dobrokhodov	Azerbaijan	(gold) Azerbaijani Championships (2005)	
Angelo Dolfini	Italy	(gold) Italian Championships (1999–2002)	
Bartosz Domański	Poland	(gold) Polish Championships (2002–03)	
Przemysław Domański	Poland	(gold) Polish Championships (2006–07, 2009, 2011)	
Richard Dornbush	United States	(gold) Junior Grand Prix Final (2010)	
Richard Dornbush	United States	(bronze) Junior Grand Prix Final (2008)	
Jack Dunn	Great Britain	(silver) World Championships (1935)	

== E ==
Skater	Nation	Major championships	Ref.
Vitali Egorov	Soviet Union	(gold) Soviet Championships (1984); World Junior Championships (1979)	
Vitali Egorov	Soviet Union	(silver) World Junior Championships (1980)	
Todd Eldredge	United States	(gold) World Championships (1996); U.S. Championships (1990–91, 1995, 1997–98, 2002); World Junior Championships (1988)	
Todd Eldredge	United States	(silver) World Championships (1995, 1997–98); Grand Prix Final (1996); World Junior Championships (1987)	
Todd Eldredge	United States	(bronze) World Championships (1991, 2001); Grand Prix Final (1997)	
Karl Enderlin	Switzerland	(gold) Swiss Championships (1940–42, 1945)	
Eduard Engelmann Jr.	Austria	(gold) European Championships (1892–94)	
Erich Erdös	Austria	(bronze) World Championships (1934); European Championships (1932–33)	
Vasili Eremenko	Soviet Union	(gold) World Junior Championships (1991)	
Alexey Erokhov	Russia	(gold) World Junior Championships (2018)	

== F ==
Skater	Nation	Major championships	Ref.
Horst Faber	Germany	(gold) German Championships (1939–41, 1944, 1947–51)	
Horst Faber	Germany	(silver) European Championships (1951)	
Horst Faber	Germany	(bronze) World Championships (1939); European Championships (1939)	
Alexandre Fadeev	Soviet Union	(gold) World Championships (1985); European Championships (1984, 1987–89); Soviet Championships (1983, 1986–90); World Junior Championships (1980)	
Alexandre Fadeev	Soviet Union	(bronze) World Championships (1984, 1986–87); European Championships (1983, 1986); World Junior Championships (1979)	
Joshua Farris	United States	(gold) World Junior Championships (2013)	
Joshua Farris	United States	(silver) Four Continents Championships (2015); World Junior Championships (2012); Junior Grand Prix Final (2012)	
Joshua Farris	United States	(bronze) Junior Grand Prix Final (2011)	
Carlo Fassi	Italy	(gold) European Championships (1953–54); Italian Championships (1945–54)	
Carlo Fassi	Italy	(silver) European Championships (1952)	
Carlo Fassi	Italy	(bronze) World Championships (1953); European Championships (1950–51)	
Jacques Favart	France	(gold) French Championships (1942)	
Fernand Fédronic	France	(gold) French Championships (1985)	
Ernst Fellner	Austria	(bronze) European Championships (1899)	
Norbert Felsinger	Austria	(gold) Austrian Championships (1954–60)	
Norbert Felsinger	Austria	(silver) European Championships (1960)	
Norbert Felsinger	Austria	(bronze) European Championships (1959)	
Marc Ferland	Canada	(silver) World Junior Championships (1984)	
Javier Fernández	Spain	(gold) World Championships (2015–16); European Championships (2013–19); Spanish Championships (2010, 2012–18)	
Javier Fernández	Spain	(silver) Grand Prix Final (2014–15)	
Javier Fernández	Spain	(bronze) Winter Olympics (2018); World Championships (2013–14); Grand Prix Final (2011)	
Nicholas Fernandez	Australia	(gold) Australian Championships (2009)	
Grzegorz Filipowski	Poland	(gold) Polish Championships (1981–86)	
Grzegorz Filipowski	Poland	(silver) European Championships (1989)	
Grzegorz Filipowski	Poland	(bronze) World Championships (1989); European Championships (1985)	
Peter Firstbrook	Canada	(gold) Canadian Championships (1951–53)	
Gilbert Fuchs	Germany	(gold) World Championships (1896, 1906); German Championships (1895–96, 1909)	
Gilbert Fuchs	Germany	(silver) World Championships (1901, 1908); European Championships (1901, 1907, 1909)	
Gilbert Fuchs	Germany	(bronze) World Championships (1898, 1907); European Championships (1895)	

== G ==
Skater	Nation	Major championships	Ref.
Artur Gachinski	Russia	(silver) European Championships (2012)	
Artur Gachinski	Russia	(bronze) World Championships (2011); World Junior Championships (2010)	
Didier Gailhaguet	France	(gold) French Championships (1974–75)	
Krzysztof Gała	Poland	(gold) Polish Championships (2017)	
Rudy Galindo	United States	(gold) U.S. Championships (1996); World Junior Championships (1987)	
Rudy Galindo	United States	(silver) World Junior Championships (1986)	
Rudy Galindo	United States	(bronze) World Championships (1996); World Junior Championships (1985)	
Allan Ganter	Australia	(gold) Australian Championships (1953–56)	
Fabrizio Garattoni	Italy	(gold) Italian Championships (1993–96)	
Gao Song	China	(gold) Junior Grand Prix Final (1999); Chinese Championships (2006)	
Gao Song	China	(bronze) Four Continents Championships (2002)	
Georges Gautschi	Switzerland	(gold) Swiss Championships (1926–27, 1931)	
Georges Gautschi	Switzerland	(silver) European Championships (1929)	
Georges Gautschi	Switzerland	(bronze) Winter Olympics (1924); World Championships (1930); European Championships (1926)	
Misha Ge	Uzbekistan	(gold) Uzbekistani Championships (2010–11, 2015–18)	
Markus Germann	Switzerland	(gold) Swiss Championships (1963–64)	
Hans Gerschwiler	Switzerland	(gold) World Championships (1947); European Championships (1947); Swiss Championships (1938–39, 1946–48)	
Hans Gerschwiler	Switzerland	(silver) Winter Olympics (1948); World Championships (1948); European Championships (1948)	
Alain Giletti	France	(gold) World Championships (1960); European Championships (1955–57, 1960–61); French Championships (1951–57, 1959–61)	
Alain Giletti	France	(silver) European Championships (1953–54, 1958–59)	
Alain Giletti	France	(bronze) World Championships (1954, 1958)	
Grzegorz Głowania	Poland	(gold) Polish Championships (1976–78, 1980)	
Yakov Godorozha	Ukraine	(gold) Ukrainian Championships (2013–14)	
Timothy Goebel	United States	(gold) U.S. Championships (2001); Junior Grand Prix Final (1997)	
Timothy Goebel	United States	(silver) World Championships (2002–03); World Junior Championships (1997)	
Timothy Goebel	United States	(bronze) Winter Olympics (2002); Grand Prix Final (1999, 2001)	
Stephen Gogolev	Canada	(gold) Canadian Championships (2026); Junior Grand Prix Final (2018)	
Otto Gold	Czechoslovakia	(silver) European Championships (1930)	
Martin Gordan	Germany	(bronze) World Championships (1902, 1904)	
Mark Gorodnitsky	Israel	(gold) Israeli Championships (2020, 2022–24)	
Gillis Grafström	Sweden	(gold) Summer Olympics (1920); Winter Olympics (1924, 1928); World Championships (1922, 1924, 1929); Swedish Championships (1917–19)	
Gillis Grafström	Sweden	(silver) Winter Olympics (1932)	
Daniel Grassl	Italy	(gold) Italian Championships (2019–22, 2025-26)	
Daniel Grassl	Italy	(silver) European Championships (2022)	
Daniel Grassl	Italy	(bronze) World Junior Championships (2019)	
Henning Grenander	Sweden	(gold) World Championships (1898)	
Henning Grenander	Sweden	(silver) European Championships (1893)	
Andrei Griazev	Russia	(gold) Russian Championships (2007); World Junior Championships (2004)	
Andrei Griazev	Russia	(silver) Junior Grand Prix Final (2003)	
Aramais Grigorian	Armenia	(gold) Armenian Championships (2003–04)	
Artem Grigoriev	Russia	(bronze) World Junior Championships (2009)	
James Grogan	United States	(silver) World Championships (1951–54)	
James Grogan	United States	(bronze) Winter Olympics (1952)	
Robert Grzegorczyk	Poland	(gold) Polish Championships (1992, 1996–2001)	
Guan Jinlin	China	(gold) Chinese Championships (2010)	
Guan Jinlin	China	(bronze) World Junior Championships (2008)	
Tomàs-Llorenç Guarino Sabaté	Spain	(gold) Spanish Championships (2021–26)	
Petr Gumennik	Russia	(gold) Russian Championships (2026)	
Petr Gumennik	Russia	(silver) Junior Grand Prix Final (2018)	
Petr Gumennik	Russia	(bronze) World Junior Championships (2020)	
Guo Zhengxin	China	(bronze) World Junior Championships (1996–97)	

== H ==
Skater	Nation	Major championships	Ref.
Adam Hagara	Slovakia	(gold) Slovak Championships (2022–26)	
Adam Hagara	Slovakia	(silver) Winter Youth Olympics (2024)	
Adam Hagara	Slovakia	(bronze) World Junior Championships (2024-25); Junior Grand Prix Final (2023)	
John Hamer	Great Britain	(gold) British Championships (2005–07)	
Scott Hamilton	United States	(gold) Winter Olympics (1984); World Championships (1981–84); U.S. Championships (1981–84)	
Han Jong-in	North Korea	(gold) North Korean Championships (2001, 2004–06)	
Yuzuru Hanyu	Japan	(gold) Winter Olympics (2014, 2018); World Championships (2014, 2017); Four Continents Championships (2020); Grand Prix Final (2013–16); Japan Championships (2013–16, 2021–22); World Junior Championships (2010); Junior Grand Prix Final (2009)	
Yuzuru Hanyu	Japan	(silver) World Championships (2015–16, 2019); Four Continents Championships (2011, 2013, 2017); Grand Prix Final (2012, 2019)	
Yuzuru Hanyu	Japan	(bronze) World Championships (2012, 2021)	
Slavik Hayrapetyan	Armenia	(gold) Armenian Championships (2011, 2015–19, 2021)	
Jorik Hendrickx	Belgium	(gold) Belgian Championships (2010, 2016–17)	
Arnoud Hendriks	Netherlands	(gold) Dutch Championships (1965–71)	
Jean Henrion	France	(gold) French Championships (1932–39)	
Luis Hernández	Mexico	(gold) Mexican Championships (2008–09, 2011–14)	
Margus Hernits	Estonia	(gold) Estonian Championships (1994–2000, 2002)	
Ernst Herz	Austria	(gold) European Championships (1908); Austrian Championships (1907)	
Ernst Herz	Austria	(silver) European Championships (1906)	
Ernst Herz	Austria	(bronze) World Championships (1909); European Championships (1907)	
Elliot Hilton	Great Britain	(gold) British Championships (2008)	
Ryuju Hino	Japan	(bronze) Junior Grand Prix Final (2012)	
Tomoki Hiwatashi	United States	(gold) World Junior Championships (2019)	
Tomoki Hiwatashi	United States	(bronze) World Junior Championships (2016)	
Thomas Hlavik	Austria	(gold) Austrian Championships (1982–84, 1986)	
Jan Hoffmann	East Germany	(gold) World Championships (1974, 1980); European Championships (1974, 1977–79); East German Championships (1971–74, 1976–80)	
Jan Hoffmann	East Germany	(silver) Winter Olympics (1980); World Championships (1977–78); European Championships (1980)	
Jan Hoffmann	East Germany	(bronze) World Championships (1973, 1976, 1979); European Championships (1973, 1976)	
Oscar Holthe	Norway	(gold) Norwegian Championships (1901-03, 1905-06)	
Oscar Holthe	Norway	(bronze) European Championships (1898, 1900)	
Takeshi Honda	Japan	(gold) Four Continents Championships (1999, 2003); Japan Championships (1996–97, 2000–01, 2003, 2005)	
Takeshi Honda	Japan	(silver) Four Continents Championships (2001–02); World Junior Championships (1996)	
Takeshi Honda	Japan	(bronze) World Championships (2002–03)	
Daniel Höner	Switzerland	(gold) Swiss Championships (1967–73)	
Oliver Höner	Switzerland	(gold) Swiss Championships (1979–80, 1982, 1984–91)	
Radek Horák	Czech Republic	(gold) Czech Championships (1996, 1968)	
Christian Horvath	Austria	(gold) Austrian Championships (1998, 2000)	
Monty Hoyt	United States	(gold) U.S. Championships (1962)	
Gustav Hügel	Austria	(gold) World Championships (1897, 1899–1900); European Championships (1901); German Championships (1901)	
Gustav Hügel	Austria	(silver) World Championships (1896, 1898); European Championships (1894–95, 1899–1900)	
Jay Humphry	Canada	(gold) Canadian Championships (1968–69)	

== I ==
Skater	Nation	Major championships	Ref.
Pavel Ignatenko	Belarus	(gold) Belarusian Championships (2013–15)	
Mario-Rafael Ionian	Austria	(gold) Austrian Championships (2015–17)	
Zeus Issariotis	Greece	(gold) Greek Championships (2004, 2006)	

== J ==
Skater	Nation	Major championships	Ref.
Donald Jackson	Canada	(gold) World Championships (1962); Canadian Championships (1959–62)	
Donald Jackson	Canada	(silver) World Championships (1959–60)	
Donald Jackson	Canada	(bronze) Winter Olympics (1960)	
Gunnar Jakobsson	Finland	(gold) Finnish Championships (1923, 1932)	
Gunnar Jakobsson	Finland	(bronze) European Championships (1923)	
Tomáš Janečko	Czech Republic	(gold) Czech Championships (2005)	
Stanick Jeannette	France	(gold) French Championships (2000–01)	
Stanick Jeannette	France	(bronze) European Championships (2001, 2003)	
David Jenkins	United States	(gold) Winter Olympics (1960); World Championships (1957–59); U.S. Championships (1957–60)	
David Jenkins	United States	(bronze) Winter Olympics (1956); World Championships (1955–56)	
Hayes Alan Jenkins	United States	(gold) Winter Olympics (1956); World Championships (1953–56); U.S. Championships (1953–56)	
Hayes Alan Jenkins	United States	(bronze) World Championships (1950, 1952)	
Jin Boyang	China	(gold) Four Continents Championships (2018); Chinese Championships (2014–17, 2019, 2026); Junior Grand Prix Final (2013)	
Jin Boyang	China	(silver) Four Continents Championships (2016, 2019); World Junior Championships (2015)	
Jin Boyang	China	(bronze) World Championships (2016–17)	
Richard Johansson	Sweden	(gold) Swedish Championships (1904, 1908–10)	
Richard Johansson	Sweden	(silver) Summer Olympics (1908)	
Clemens Jonas	Austria	(gold) Austrian Championships (1999, 2001–02, 2004)	
Peter Jonas	Austria	(gold) Austrian Championships (1961–64)	
Peter Jonas	Austria	(bronze) European Championships (1965)	
Brian Joubert	France	(gold) World Championships (2007); European Championships (2004, 2007, 2009); Grand Prix Final (2006); French Championships (2003–08, 2011–12)	
Brian Joubert	France	(silver) World Championships (2004, 2006, 2008); European Championships (2003, 2005, 2011)	
Brian Joubert	France	(bronze) World Championships (2009–10); European Championships (2002, 2006, 2008, 2010); Grand Prix Final (2002)	
Dillon Judge	Ireland	(gold) Irish Championships (2023, 2025)	

== K ==
Skater	Nation	Major championships	Ref.
Fritz Kachler	Austria	(gold) World Championships (1912–13, 1923); European Championships (1914, 1924); Austrian Championships (1910–12, 1925)	
Fritz Kachler	Austria	(silver) World Championships (1914, 1922, 1925); European Championships (1922)	
Fritz Kachler	Austria	(bronze) World Championships (1911)	
Masakazu Kagiyama	Japan	(gold) Japan Championships (1991–93)	
Masakazu Kagiyama	Japan	(bronze) World Junior Championships (1989)	
Yuma Kagiyama	Japan	(gold) Four Continents Championships (2024); Winter Youth Olympics (2020); Japan Championships (2025-26)	
Yuma Kagiyama	Japan	(silver) Winter Olympics (2022); World Championships (2021–22, 2024); Grand Prix Final (2024-25); Winter Youth Olympics (2020); World Junior Championships (2020); Winter Olympics (2026)	
Yuma Kagiyama	Japan	(bronze) Four Continents Championships (2020); Grand Prix Final (2023); World Championships (2025)	
Austin Kanallakan	United States	(silver) Junior Grand Prix Final (2005)	
Darian Kaptich	Australia	(gold) Australian Championships (2023–25)	
Pavel Kaška	Czech Republic	(gold) Czech Championships (2009)	
Felix Kaspar	Austria	(gold) World Championships (1937–38); European Championships (1937–38); Austrian Championships (1935, 1937–38)	
Felix Kaspar	Austria	(silver) European Championships (1935)	
Felix Kaspar	Austria	(bronze) Winter Olympics (1936); World Championships (1936)	
Alexandr Kazakov	Belarus	(gold) Belarusian Championships (2009–10)	
Róbert Kažimír	Slovakia	(gold) Slovak Championships (1995–97, 1999, 2001)	
Zoltán Kelemen	Romania	(gold) Romanian Championships (2007–14)	
Zsolt Kerekes	Hungary	(gold) Hungarian Championships (1994-95)	
Brendan Kerry	Australia	(gold) Australian Championships (2012, 2014–20)	
Jari Kessler	Croatia	(gold) Croatian Championships (2020, 2023–25)	
Kim Hyun-gyeom	South Korea	(gold) Winter Youth Olympics (2024)	
Kim Hyun-gyeom	South Korea	(silver) Junior Grand Prix Final (2023)	
Kim Min-seok	South Korea	(gold) South Korean Championships (2009–10)	
Ede Király	Hungary	(gold) European Championships (1950); Hungarian Championships (1944, 1946–50)	
Ede Király	Hungary	(silver) World Championships (1949–50); European Championships (1949)	
Ede Király	Hungary	(bronze) World Championships (1948)	
Michael Kirby	Canada	(gold) Canadian Championships (1942)	
Falko Kirsten	East Germany	(gold) East German Championships (1983–87)	
Falko Kirsten	East Germany	(bronze) World Junior Championships (1980)	
Marco Klepoch	Slovakia	(gold) Slovak Championships (2013–15, 2019, 2021)	
Ilia Klimkin	Russia	(gold) World Junior Championships (1999)	
Ilia Klimkin	Russia	(silver) Grand Prix Final (2002); Junior Grand Prix Final (1998)	
Ilia Klimkin	Russia	(bronze) European Championships (2004)	
Donald Knight	Canada	(gold) Canadian Championships (1965–67)	
Donald Knight	Canada	(bronze) World Championships (1965)	
Manuel Koll	Austria	(gold) Austrian Championships (2007–08, 2018)	
Mikhail Kolyada	Russia	(gold) Russian Championships (2017–18, 2021)	
Mikhail Kolyada	Russia	(silver) Winter Olympics (2018)	
Mikhail Kolyada	Russia	(bronze) World Championships (2018); European Championships (2017–18); Grand Prix Final (2017)	
Zbigniew Komorowski	Poland	(gold) Polish Championships (1994-95)	
Mark Kondratiuk	Russia	(gold) European Championships (2022); Russian Championships (2022)	
Mark Kondratiuk	Russia	(bronze) Winter Olympics (2022)	
Alexander König	East Germany	(bronze) World Junior Championships (1982)	
Hubert Köpfler	Switzerland	(gold) Swiss Championships (1953, 1957, 1959–61)	
Nils Köpp	East Germany	(bronze) World Junior Championships (1983)	
Ronald Koppelent	Austria	(gold) Austrian Championships (1974–77)	
Eduard Kõppo	Estonia	(gold) Estonian Championships (1918)	
Konstantin Kostin	Soviet Union	(silver) World Junior Championships (1992)	
Konstantin Kostin	Latvia	(gold) Latvian Championships (1993, 2001)	
Vladimir Kotin	Soviet Union	(gold) Soviet Championships (1985)	
Vladimir Kotin	Soviet Union	(silver) European Championships (1985–88); World Junior Championships (1978)	
Petr Kotlařík	Czech Republic	(gold) Czech Championships (2023)	
Sergei Kotov	Israel	(gold) Israeli Championships (2003)	
Vladimir Kovalyov	Soviet Union	(gold) World Championships (1977, 1979); European Championships (1975); Soviet Championships (1972, 1977)	
Vladimir Kovalyov	Soviet Union	(silver) Winter Olympics (1976); World Championships (1975–76); European Championships (1976–79)	
Vladimir Kovalyov	Soviet Union	(bronze) World Championships (1972); European Championships (1980)	
Anton Kovalevski	Ukraine	(gold) Ukrainian Championships (2006–07, 2009–11)	
Maxim Kovtun	Russia	(gold) Russian Championships (2014–16, 2019); Junior Grand Prix Final (2012)	
Maxim Kovtun	Russia	(silver) European Championships (2015, 2017)	
Maxim Kovtun	Russia	(bronze) European Championships (2016)	
Alexei Kozlov	Estonia	(gold) Estonian Championships (1991, 2001, 2003–04)	
Takahiko Kozuka	Japan	(gold) Japan Championships (2011); World Junior Championships (2006); Junior Grand Prix Final (2005)	
Takahiko Kozuka	Japan	(silver) World Championships (2011); Four Continents Championships (2014); Grand Prix Final (2008)	
Takahiko Kozuka	Japan	(bronze) Four Continents Championships (2009); Grand Prix Final (2010)	
Alexei Krasnozhon	United States	(gold) Junior Grand Prix Final (2017)	
Helmut Kristofics-Binder	Austria	(gold) Austrian Championships (1979–81)	
Andreas Krogh	Norway	(gold) Norwegian Championships (1912, 1914–15, 1935)	
Andreas Krogh	Norway	(silver) Winter Olympics (1920); European Championships (1914)	
Henryk Krukowicz-Przedrzymirski	Austria	(bronze) European Championships (1908)	
Terry Kubicka	United States	(gold) U.S. Championships (1976)	
Ilia Kulik	Russia	(gold) Winter Olympics (1998); European Championships (1995); Grand Prix Final (1997); Russian Championships (1997–98); World Junior Championships (1995)	
Ilia Kulik	Russia	(silver) World Championships (1996)	
Ilia Kulik	Russia	(bronze) European Championships (1996); World Junior Championships (1993)	
Fedir Kulish	Latvia	(gold) Latvian Championships (2026)	
Tamir Kuperman	Israel	(gold) Israeli Championships (2026)	
Maciej Kuś	Poland	(gold) Polish Championships (2004–05)	
Morisi Kvitelashvili	Georgia	(gold) Georgian Championships (2018)	
Morisi Kvitelashvili	Georgia	(bronze) European Championships (2020)	

== L ==
Skater	Nation	Major championships	Ref.
Ronald Lam	Hong Kong	(gold) Hong Kong Championships (2012, 2014–15)	
Stéphane Lambiel	Switzerland	(gold) World Championships (2005–06); Grand Prix Final (2005, 2007); Swiss Championships (2001–08, 2010)	
Stéphane Lambiel	Switzerland	(silver) Winter Olympics (2006); European Championships (2006, 2008, 2010)	
Stéphane Lambiel	Switzerland	(bronze) World Championships (2007)	
Erik Larson	United States	(gold) World Junior Championships (1985)	
Alexander Lebedev	Belarus	(gold) Belarusian Championships (2023)	
Lee Dong-whun	South Korea	(gold) South Korean Championships (2004–08)	
Lee Kyu-hyun	South Korea	(gold) South Korean Championships (1996–2003)	
Robin Lee	United States	(gold) U.S. Championships (1935–39)	
Fernand Leemans	Belgium	(bronze) European Championships (1947)	
Johan Lefstad	Norway	(gold) Norwegian Championships (1894–97, 1899–1900, 1904)	
Johan Lefstad	Norway	(silver) European Championships (1898)	
Johan Lefstad	Norway	(bronze) World Championships (1897)	
Juan Legaz	Spain	(gold) Spanish Championships (2005)	
Markus Leminen	Finland	(gold) Finnish Championships (1992–93, 1995–2002)	
Arlet Levandi	Estonia	(gold) Winter Youth Olympics (2020)	
Davide Lewton Brain	Monaco	(gold) Monaco Championships (2018–19)	
Li Chengjiang	China	(gold) Four Continents Championships (2001); Chinese Championships (1998–99, 2001, 2004, 2007-08)	
Li Chengjiang	China	(silver) Four Continents Championships (1999–2000, 2005)	
Li Chengjiang	China	(bronze) Four Continents Championships (2003); Grand Prix Final (2004)	
Dwayne Li	New Zealand	(gold) New Zealand Championships (2026)	
Dwayne Li	New Zealand	(bronze) Winter Youth Olympics (2024)	
Li Yu-Hsiang	Chinese Taipei	(gold) Chinese Taipei Championships (2025)	
Li Yunfei	China	(bronze) World Junior Championships (1998)	
Peter Liebers	Germany	(gold) German Championships (2009, 2011–14, 2017)	
Maurice Lim	Netherlands	(gold) Dutch Championships (1999–2000)	
Stefan Lindemann	Germany	(gold) German Championships (2000, 2002, 2004–07, 2010); World Junior Championships (2000)	
Stefan Lindemann	Germany	(silver) Junior Grand Prix Final (1999)	
Stefan Lindemann	Germany	(bronze) World Championships (2004); European Championships (2005)	
Frédéric Lipka	France	(gold) French Championships (1988)	
Juri Litvinov	Kazakhstan	(gold) Kazakhstani Championships (2001–03)	
Vladimir Litvintsev	Azerbaijan	(gold) Azerbaijani Championships (2019)	
Thomas Litz	United States	(gold) U.S. Championships (1963)	
Anthony Liu	China	(gold) Chinese Championships (1993)	
Anthony Liu	Australia	(gold) Australian Championships (1996–2003)	
Bradley Lord	United States	(gold) U.S. Championships (1961)	
Evan Lysacek	United States	(gold) Winter Olympics (2010); World Championships (2009); Four Continents Championships (2005, 2007); Grand Prix Final (2009); U.S. Championships (2007–08); Junior Grand Prix Final (2003)	
Evan Lysacek	United States	(silver) Four Continents Championships (2009); World Junior Championships (2001, 2003–04)	
Evan Lysacek	United States	(bronze) World Championships (2005–06); Four Continents Championships (2004, 2008); Grand Prix Final (2007)	

== M ==
Skater	Nation	Major championships	Ref.
Ma Xiaodong	China	(gold) Junior Grand Prix Final (2000)	
Ma Xiaodong	China	(silver) Junior Grand Prix Final (2001)	
Christopher Mabee	Canada	(silver) Four Continents Championships (2002); Canadian Championships (2007)	
Christopher Mabee	Canada	(bronze) Junior Grand Prix Final (2003)	
Tatsuki Machida	Japan	(silver) World Championships (2014); Four Continents Championships (2010)	
Igor Macypura	Slovakia	(gold) Slovak Championships (2005, 2007–08)	
Louis Magnus	France	(gold) French Championships (1908–11)	
Armin Mahbanoozadeh	United States	(silver) Junior Grand Prix Final (2008)	
Armin Mahbanoozadeh	United States	(bronze) Junior Grand Prix Final (2007)	
Luc Maierhofer	Austria	(gold) Austrian Championships (2022)	
Alexander Majorov	Sweden	(gold) Swedish Championships (2012–14, 2017–19)	
Alexander Majorov	Sweden	(bronze) World Junior Championships (2011)	
Nikolaj Majorov	Sweden	(gold) Swedish Championships (2020, 2022)	
Ilia Malinin	United States	(gold) World Championships (2024–25); Grand Prix Final (2023-25); U.S. Championships (2023–26); World Junior Championships (2022)	
Ilia Malinin	United States	(bronze) World Championships (2023); Grand Prix Final (2022)	
Ivan Malinin	Russia	(gold) Russian Championships (1913–14)	
Ivan Malinin	Russia	(silver) European Championships (1912)	
Panagiotis Markouizos	Greece	(gold) Greek Championships (1996, 1998–2003)	
Boris Martinec	Croatia	(gold) Croatian Championships (2004–05, 2007–11)	
Dikki John Martinez	Philippines	(gold) Philippine Championships (2009)	
Roman Martõnenko	Estonia	(gold) Estonian Championships (1990, 1992–93)	
Ralph McCreath	Canada	(gold) Canadian Championships (1940–41, 1946)	
David McGillivray	Canada	(gold) Canadian Championships (1970)	
Gordon McKellen	United States	(gold) U.S. Championships (1973–75)	
Robert McNamara	Australia	(gold) Australian Championships (2010)	
Donald McPherson	Canada	(gold) World Championships (1963); Canadian Championships (1963)	
Axel Médéric	France	(gold) French Championships (1989)	
Cameron Medhurst	Australia	(gold) Australian Championships (1982, 1984–90)	
Alfred Mégroz	Switzerland	(gold) Swiss Championships (1919, 1921, 1924)	
Patrick Meier	Switzerland	(gold) Swiss Championships (1992, 1994, 1996–2000)	
Nikolaj Memola	Italy	(gold) Italian Championships (2024); Junior Grand Prix Final (2022)	
Nikolaj Memola	Italy	(silver) European Championships (2025)	
Konstantin Menshov	Russia	(gold) Russian Championships (2011)	
Konstantin Menshov	Russia	(bronze) European Championships (2014)	
Keegan Messing	Canada	(gold) Canadian Championships (2022–23)	
Keegan Messing	Canada	(silver) Four Continents Championships (2023)	
Bror Meyer	Sweden	(gold) Swedish Championships (1906)	
Bror Meyer	Sweden	(bronze) World Championships (1906)	
Jere Michael	United States	(bronze) World Junior Championships (1994)	
Miloš Milanović	Serbia	(gold) Serbian Championships (1997–2001)	
Éric Millot	France	(gold) French Championships (1990–93)	
Éric Millot	France	(bronze) European Championships (1993); Grand Prix Final (1995)	
Konstantin Milyukov	Belarus	(gold) Belarusian Championships (2021–22)	
Ross Miner	United States	(bronze) Four Continents Championships (2012); Junior Grand Prix Final (2009)	
Mikko Minkkinen	Finland	(gold) Finnish Championships (2008)	
Kao Miura	Japan	(gold) Four Continents Championships (2023); World Junior Championships (2023)	
Kao Miura	Japan	(bronze) Four Continents Championships (2022)	
Gabriel Monnier	France	(gold) French Championships (2002)	
Miguel Ángel Moyron	Mexico	(gold) Mexican Championships (2005, 2007)	
Andrei Mozalev	Russia	(gold) World Junior Championships (2020)	
Andrei Mozalev	Russia	(silver) Winter Youth Olympics (2020); Junior Grand Prix Final (2019)	
Andrei Mozalev	Russia	(bronze) Winter Youth Olympics (2020)	
Brandon Mroz	United States	(silver) Junior Grand Prix Final (2006–07)	
Jacques Mrozek	France	(gold) French Championships (1973)	
Boyito Mulder	Netherlands	(gold) Dutch Championships (2009–12)	
Hans Müller	Switzerland	(gold) Swiss Championships (1955)	
Takashi Mura	Japan	(silver) World Junior Championships (1976)	
Alexander Murashko	Belarus	(gold) Belarusian Championships (1992–97)	
Vakhtang Murvanidze	Georgia	(gold) Georgian Championships (1997–2006)	
Patrick Myzyk	Poland	(gold) Polish Championships (2013, 2015)	

== N ==
Skater	Nation	Major championships	Ref.
Nicolas Nadeau	Canada	(silver) World Junior Championships (2016)	
Rio Nakata	Japan	(gold) World Junior Championships (2025); Junior Grand Prix Final (2023)	
Rio Nakata	Japan	(silver) World Junior Championships (2024); Junior Grand Prix Final (2025)	
Rio Nakata	Japan	(bronze) Junior Grand Prix Final (2024)	
Yasuharu Nanri	Japan	(silver) Junior Grand Prix Final (2004)	
Daniel Albert Naurits	Estonia	(gold) Estonian Championships (2017–18)	
Marius Negrea	Romania	(gold) Romanian Championships (1992)	
Marius Negrea	Switzerland	(gold) Swiss Championships (1995)	
Ondrej Nepela	Czechoslovakia	(gold) Winter Olympics (1972); World Championships (1971–73); European Championships (1969–73); Czechoslovak Championships (1965–69, 1971–73)	
Ondrej Nepela	Czechoslovakia	(silver) World Championships (1969–70)	
Ondrej Nepela	Czechoslovakia	(bronze) European Championships (1966–68)	
Graham Newberry	Great Britain	(gold) British Championships (2017, 2019, 2022–23)	
Nam Nguyen	Canada	(gold) Canadian Championships (2015, 2019); World Junior Championships (2014)	
Marcus Nikkanen	Finland	(gold) Finnish Championships (1927–30, 1934–35, 1938–39, 1945–46)	
Marcus Nikkanen	Finland	(bronze) European Championships (1930)	
Nathaniel Niles	United States	(gold) U.S. Championships (1918, 1925, 1927)	
Andreas Nordebäck	Sweden	(gold) Swedish Championships (2023, 2026)	
Przemysław Noworyta	Poland	(gold) Polish Championships (1987–89)	
Ari-Pekka Nurmenkari	Finland	(gold) Finnish Championships (2003–07, 2009–10, 2012)	

== O ==
Skater	Nation	Major championships	Ref.
Nobunari Oda	Japan	(gold) Four Continents Championships (2006); Japan Championships (2009); World Junior Championships (2005)	
Nobunari Oda	Japan	(silver) Grand Prix Final (2009–10)	
Nobunari Oda	Japan	(bronze) Grand Prix Final (2006, 2013)	
Sondre Oddvoll Bøe	Norway	(gold) Norwegian Championships (2014, 2016, 2019–20)	
Karl Ollo	Russia	(gold) Russian Championships (1910–12)	
Karl Ollo	Russia	(silver) European Championships (1911)	
Shotaro Omori	United States	(bronze) World Junior Championships (2013)	
Ernst Oppacher	Austria	(gold) Austrian Championships (1921–22)	
Ernst Oppacher	Austria	(bronze) World Championships (1924); European Championships (1922)	
Brian Orser	Canada	(gold) World Championships (1987); Canadian Championships (1981–88)	
Brian Orser	Canada	(silver) Winter Olympics (1984, 1988); World Championships (1984–86, 1988)	
Brian Orser	Canada	(bronze) World Championships (1983)	
Damjan Ostojič	Bosnia and Herzegovina	(gold) Bosnian Championships (2007–13)	
Jamal Othman	Switzerland	(gold) Swiss Championships (2009)	
Haig Oundjian	Great Britain	(gold) British Championships (1969–70, 1972)	
Haig Oundjian	Great Britain	(bronze) European Championships (1971)	
Rob Ouwerkerk	Netherlands	(gold) Dutch Championships (1972–75)	
Yuri Ovchinnikov	Soviet Union	(gold) Soviet Championships (1975)	
Yuri Ovchinnikov	Soviet Union	(bronze) European Championships (1975)	

== P ==
Skater	Nation	Major championships	Ref.
François Pache	Switzerland	(gold) Swiss Championships (1951–52, 1954, 1956, 1958, 1962)	
John Page	Great Britain	(gold) British Championships (1922-31, 1933)	
John Page	Great Britain	(bronze) World Championships (1926)	
Nikolai Panin	Russia	(gold) Summer Olympics (1908) (Note: Nikolai Panin won his gold medal in special figures.); Russian Championships (1901–05, 1907)	
Nikolai Panin	Russia	(silver) World Championships (1903); European Championships (1908)	
Nikolai Panin	Russia	(bronze) European Championships (1904)	
Yaroslav Paniot	Ukraine	(gold) Ukrainian Championships (2015, 2018)	
Yaroslav Paniot	Ukraine	(silver) Winter Youth Olympics (2012)	
Bela Papp	Finland	(gold) Finnish Championships (2011)	
Paul Bonifacio Parkinson	Italy	(gold) Italian Championships (2013)	
Matthew Parr	Great Britain	(gold) British Championships (2009–10, 2013–14)	
Michael Pasfield	Australia	(gold) Australian Championships (1980–81)	
Igor Pashkevich	Soviet Union	(gold) World Junior Championships (1990)	
Igor Pashkevich	Russia	(silver) European Championships (1996)	
Igor Pashkevich	Azerbaijan	(gold) Azerbaijani Championships (1998)	
Dénes Pataky	Hungary	(gold) Hungarian Championships (1933–36)	
Dénes Pataky	Hungary	(silver) European Championships (1934)	
Dénes Pataky	Hungary	(bronze) World Championships (1935)	
Parker Pennington	United States	(bronze) Junior Grand Prix Final (2002)	
Mark Pepperday	Great Britain	(gold) British Championships (1982–84)	
Mark Pepperday	Great Britain	(silver) World Junior Championships (1977)	
Patrick Péra	France	(gold) French Championships (1966–72)	
Patrick Péra	France	(silver) World Championships (1971); European Championships (1969–70)	
Patrick Péra	France	(bronze) Winter Olympics (1968, 1972); World Championships (1968–69); European Championships (1972)	
John Misha Petkevich	United States	(gold) U.S. Championships (1971)	
Stanislav Pertsov	Ukraine	(gold) Ukrainian Championships (2012)	
Nicolas Pétorin	France	(bronze) World Junior Championships (1991)	
Viktor Petrenko	Soviet Union	(gold) European Championships (1990–91); Soviet Championships (1991); World Junior Championships (1984)	
Viktor Petrenko	Soviet Union	(silver) World Championships (1990–91)	
Viktor Petrenko	Soviet Union	(bronze) Winter Olympics (1988); World Championships (1988); European Championships (1987–88)	
Viktor Petrenko	CIS	(gold) Winter Olympics (1992); World Championships (1992)	
Viktor Petrenko	CIS	(silver) European Championships (1992)	
Viktor Petrenko	Ukraine	(gold) European Championships (1994); Ukrainian Championships (1994)	
Vladimir Petrenko	Soviet Union	(gold) World Junior Championships (1986)	
Vladimir Petrenko	Soviet Union	(silver) World Junior Championships (1985)	
Alexander Petrov	Russia	(bronze) Junior Grand Prix Final (2014)	
Viktor Pfeifer	Austria	(gold) Austrian Championships (2003, 2005–06, 2009–14)	
Zdzisław Pieńkowski	Poland	(gold) Polish Championships (1966, 1968, 1970)	
Justin Pietersen	South Africa	(gold) South African Championships (2005, 2007–11)	
Adian Pitkeev	Russia	(silver) World Junior Championships (2014); Junior Grand Prix Final (2013)	
Evgeni Plushenko	Russia	(gold) Winter Olympics (2006, 2014); World Championships (2001, 2003–04); European Championships (2000–01, 2003, 2005–06, 2010, 2012); Grand Prix Final (1999–2000, 2002, 2004); Russian Championships (1999–2002, 2004–06, 2010, 2012–13); World Junior Championships (1997)	
Evgeni Plushenko	Russia	(silver) Winter Olympics (2002, 2010); World Championships (1999); European Championships (1998–99, 2004); Grand Prix Final (2001, 2003)	
Evgeni Plushenko	Russia	(bronze) World Championships (1998); Grand Prix Final (1998)	
Yevhen Plyuta	Ukraine	(gold) World Junior Championships (1993)	
Brian Pockar	Canada	(gold) Canadian Championships (1978–80)	
Brian Pockar	Canada	(bronze) World Championships (1982); World Junior Championships (1976)	
Yannick Ponsero	France	(gold) French Championships (2009)	
Yannick Ponsero	France	(silver) World Junior Championships (2005)	
Yannick Ponsero	France	(bronze) World Junior Championships (2006)	
Karlo Požgajčić	Croatia	(gold) Croatian Championships (1999–2001)	
Alban Préaubert	France	(bronze) World Junior Championships (2003)	
Otto Preißecker	Austria	(gold) Austrian Championships (1926–28)	
Otto Preißecker	Austria	(silver) World Championships (1926–27); European Championships (1926)	
Otto Preißecker	Austria	(bronze) World Championships (1925); European Championships (1925, 1928)	
Camden Pulkinen	United States	(silver) Junior Grand Prix Final (2017)	

== Q ==
Skater	Nation	Major championships	Ref.
Dino Quattrocecere	South Africa	(gold) South African Championships (2001–03)	

== R ==
Skater	Nation	Major championships	Ref.
Edi Rada	Austria	(gold) European Championships (1949); Austrian Championships (1939–42, 1946–49)	
Edi Rada	Austria	(bronze) Winter Olympics (1948); World Championships (1949); European Championships (1948)	
Taras Rajec	Slovakia	(gold) Slovak Championships (2012)	
Abzal Rakimgaliev	Kazakhstan	(gold) Kazakh Championships (2007)	
Lukáš Rakowski	Czech Republic	(gold) Czech Championships (1999–2001)	
Javier Raya	Spain	(gold) Spanish Championships (2011)	
Mikael Redin	Switzerland	(gold) Swiss Championships (2011)	
Peter Reitmayer	Slovakia	(gold) Slovak Championships (2009–10)	
Aidas Reklys	Lithuania	(gold) Lithuanian Championships (2000, 2002–06)	
Georgii Reshtenko	Czech Republic	(gold) Czech Championships (2024–26)	
Vincent Restencourt	France	(gold) Junior Grand Prix Final (1998)	
Vincent Restencourt	France	(silver) World Junior Championships (1999–2000)	
Vincent Restencourt	France	(bronze) World Junior Championships (2001)	
Ruben Reus	Netherlands	(gold) Dutch Championships (2005)	
Kevin Reynolds	Canada	(gold) Four Continents Championships (2013)	
Kevin Reynolds	Canada	(silver) Winter Olympics (2014)	
Kevin Reynolds	Canada	(bronze) Four Continents Championships (2010); Junior Grand Prix Final (2006)	
Igor Reznichenko	Poland	(gold) Polish Championships (2016, 2018–19)	
Ri Song-chol	North Korea	(gold) North Korean Championships (2003, 2007–10)	
Alessandro Riccitelli	Italy	(gold) Italian Championships (1984–91)	
David Richardson	Great Britain	(gold) British Championships (2011)	
Ivan Righini	Italy	(gold) Italian Championships (2014–17)	
Adam Rippon	United States	(gold) Four Continents Championships (2010); U.S. Championships (2016); World Junior Championships (2008–09); Junior Grand Prix Final (2007)	
Adam Rippon	United States	(bronze) Winter Olympics (2018)	
Werner Rittberger	Germany	(gold) German Championships (1911–13, 1920–26, 1928)	
Werner Rittberger	Germany	(silver) World Championships (1910–12); European Championships (1910, 1925)	
Werner Rittberger	Germany	(bronze) European Championships (1911, 1924)	
Matteo Rizzo	Italy	(gold) Italian Championships (2018, 2023)	
Matteo Rizzo	Italy	(silver) European Championships (2023)	
Matteo Rizzo	Italy	(bronze) European Championships (2019, 2024); World Junior Championships (2018)	
Ronald Robertson	United States	(silver) Winter Olympics (1956); World Championships (1955–56)	
Melville Rogers	Canada	(gold) Canadian Championships (1923, 1925–28)	
Andrei Rogozine	Canada	(gold) World Junior Championships (2011)	
Andrei Rogozine	Canada	(bronze) Junior Grand Prix Final (2010)	
Viktor Romanenkov	Estonia	(gold) Estonian Championships (2008–14)	
Philippe Roncoli	France	(gold) French Championships (1987)	
Philippe Roncoli	France	(silver) World Junior Championships (1983)	
Naoki Rossi	Switzerland	(silver) World Junior Championships (2023)	
Sergei Rylov	Azerbaijan	(gold) Azerbaijani Championships (1999–2002)	

== S ==
Skater	Nation	Major championships	Ref.
Jozef Sabovčík	Czechoslovakia	(gold) European Championships (1985–86); Czechoslovak Championships (1980–84, 1986)	
Jozef Sabovčík	Czechoslovakia	(silver) European Championships (1983)	
Jozef Sabovčík	Czechoslovakia	(bronze) Winter Olympics (1984)	
Roman Sadovsky	Canada	(gold) Canadian Championships (2020, 2025)	
Nurullah Sahaka	Switzerland	(gold) Swiss Championships (2023)	
Ulrich Salchow	Sweden	(gold) Summer Olympics (1908); World Championships (1901–05, 1907–11); European Championships (1898–1900, 1904, 1906–07, 1909–10, 1913); Swedish Championships (1895–97)	
Ulrich Salchow	Sweden	(silver) World Championships (1897, 1899–1900)	
Ulrich Salchow	Sweden	(bronze) European Championships (1901)	
Alexander Samarin	Russia	(silver) European Championships (2019); Junior Grand Prix Final (2016)	
Alexander Samarin	Russia	(bronze) World Junior Championships (2017)	
Daniel Samohin	Israel	(gold) Israeli Championships (2015, 2019); World Junior Championships (2016)	
Vladimir Samoilov	Poland	(gold) Polish Championships (2022–26)	
Daniil Samsonov	Russia	(bronze) Winter Youth Olympics (2020); Junior Grand Prix Final (2019)	
Gösta Sandahl	Sweden	(gold) World Championships (1914); European Championships (1912); Swedish Championships (1911–13, 1916, 1923)	
Gösta Sandahl	Sweden	(bronze) World Championships (1923)	
Georg Sanders	Russia	(bronze) World Championships (1896)	
Emanuel Sandhu	Canada	(gold) Grand Prix Final (2003); Canadian Championships (2001, 2003–04)	
Emanuel Sandhu	Canada	(silver) Four Continents Championships (2004)	
Minoru Sano	Japan	(gold) Japanese Championships (1973-77)	
Minoru Sano	Japan	(bronze) World Championships (1977)	
Bradley Santer	Australia	(gold) Australian Championships (2004–05)	
Shun Sato	Japan	(gold) Junior Grand Prix Final (2019)	
Shun Sato	Japan	(silver) Four Continents Championships (2024)	
Shun Sato	Japan	(bronze) Four Continents Championships (2023); Grand Prix Final (2024-25); Winter Olympics (2026)	
Matthew Savoie	United States	(bronze) Four Continents Championships (2006); Grand Prix Final (2000); World Junior Championships (2000); Junior Grand Prix Final (1997)	
Roman Savosin	Russia	(silver) World Junior Championships (2019)	
Vitali Sazonets	Ukraine	(gold) Ukrainian Championships (2008)	
Karl Schäfer	Austria	(gold) Winter Olympics (1932, 1936); World Championships (1930–36); European Championships (1929–36); Austrian Championships (1929–34, 1936)	
Karl Schäfer	Austria	(silver) World Championships (1928–29); European Championships (1928–29)	
Karl Schäfer	Austria	(bronze) World Championships (1927); European Championships (1927)	
A. Schmitson	Germany	(gold) German Championships (1891)	
A. Schmitson	Germany	(silver) European Championships (1891)	
Manfred Schnelldorfer	West Germany	(gold) Winter Olympics (1964); World Championships (1964); German Championships (1956–61, 1963–64)	
Manfred Schnelldorfer	West Germany	(silver) European Championships (1963–64)	
Manfred Schnelldorfer	West Germany	(bronze) World Championships (1963); European Championships (1960–62)	
William Schober	Australia	(gold) Australian Championships (1973–76, 1978–79)	
Norbert Schramm	West Germany	(gold) European Championships (1982–83); German Championships (1979, 1981, 1984)	
Norbert Schramm	West Germany	(silver) World Championships (1982–83)	
Norbert Schramm	West Germany	(bronze) European Championships (1981, 1984)	
Adrian Schultheiss	Sweden	(gold) Swedish Championships (2006)	
Alcuin Schulten	Netherlands	(gold) Dutch Championships (1986–90, 1992)	
Wolfgang Schwarz	Austria	(gold) Winter Olympics (1968)	
Wolfgang Schwarz	Austria	(silver) World Championships (1966–67); European Championships (1966–68)	
Norman M. Scott	Canada	(gold) Canadian Championships (1914, 1920-21); U.S. Championships (1914)	
Hellmut Seibt	Austria	(gold) European Championships (1951–52); Austrian Championships (1950–52)	
Hellmut Seibt	Austria	(silver) Winter Olympics (1952); European Championships (1950)	
Hellmut Seibt	Austria	(bronze) World Championships (1951); European Championships (1949)	
Aleksandr Selevko	Estonia	(gold) Estonian Championships (2020–22, 2026)	
Aleksandr Selevko	Estonia	(silver) European Championships (2024)	
Mihhail Selevko	Estonia	(gold) Estonian Championships (2019, 2023–25)	
Seo Min-kyu	South Korea	(gold) World Junior Championships (2024); Junior Grand Prix Final (2025)	
Seo Min-kyu	South Korea	(silver) World Junior Championships (2025); Junior Grand Prix Final (2024)	
Roman Serov	Israel	(gold) Israeli Championships (2004–05)	
Mikhail Shaidorov	Kazakhstan	(gold) Kazakhstani Championships (2020–24); Four Continents Championships (2025); Winter Olympics (2026)	
Mikhail Shaidorov	Kazakhstan	(silver) World Junior Championships (2022); World Championships (2025)	
Graham Sharp	Great Britain	(gold) World Championships (1939); European Championships (1939); British Championships (1934–39, 1946, 1948)	
Graham Sharp	Great Britain	(silver) World Championships (1936–38); European Championships (1936–38)	
Ron Shaver	Canada	(gold) Canadian Championships (1977)	
Kenneth Shelley	United States	(gold) U.S. Championships (1972)	
Naoki Shigematsu	Japan	(silver) World Junior Championships (1994)	
Koshiro Shimada	Japan	(bronze) Junior Grand Prix Final (2018)	
Maxim Shipov	Israel	(gold) Israeli Championships (2007–09)	
Michael Shmerkin	Israel	(gold) Israeli Championships (1992–98, 2000–02)	
Ivan Shmuratko	Ukraine	(gold) Ukrainian Championships (2019–22)	
Ivan Shmuratko	Ukraine	(silver) Winter Youth Olympics (2016)	
Alexander Shubin	Russia	(gold) World Junior Championships (2003); Junior Grand Prix Final (2002)	
Adam Siao Him Fa	France	(gold) European Championships (2023–24); French Championships (2023–24)	
Adam Siao Him Fa	France	(bronze) World Championships (2024); European Championships (2024)	
Jean-Christophe Simond	France	(gold) French Championships (1976–77, 1979–84)	
Jean-Christophe Simond	France	(silver) European Championships (1981–82)	
Roman Skorniakov	Uzbekistan	(gold) Uzbekistani Championships (1997–2003)	
Michael Slipchuk	Canada	(gold) Canadian Championships (1992)	
Silvio Smalun	Germany	(gold) German Championships (2001, 2003)	
Charles Snelling	Canada	(gold) Canadian Championships (1954–58, 1964)	
Charles Snelling	Canada	(bronze) World Championships (1957)	
Bobby Specht	United States	(gold) U.S. Championships (1942)	
Song Nan	China	(gold) Chinese Championships (2009, 2012–13)	
Song Nan	China	(silver) World Junior Championships (2010); Junior Grand Prix Final (2009)	
Song Nan	China	(bronze) Four Continents Championships (2014)	
Nikita Starostin	Germany	(gold) German Championships (2023, 2025)	
Freimut Stein	West Germany	(gold) German Championships (1952–54)	
Freimut Stein	West Germany	(bronze) European Championships (1953)	
Filip Stiller	Sweden	(gold) Swedish Figure Skating Championships (1999, 2002–03)	
Martin Stixrud	Norway	(gold) Norwegian Championships (1913, 1916–24)	
Martin Stixrud	Norway	(silver) European Championships (1923)	
Martin Stixrud	Norway	(bronze) Summer Olympics (1920); European Championships (1912)	
Elvis Stojko	Canada	(gold) World Championships (1994–95, 1997); Four Continents Championships (2000); Grand Prix Final (1996); Canadian Championships (1994, 1996–2000, 2002)	
Elvis Stojko	Canada	(silver) Winter Olympics (1994, 1998); World Championships (1993, 2000); Grand Prix Final (1995, 1997, 1999)	
Elvis Stojko	Canada	(bronze) World Championships (1992); Four Continents Championships (1999)	
Alan Street	Great Britain	(gold) British Championships (2001)	
Franz Streubel	Germany	(gold) German Championships (2015–16)	
Mitsuki Sumoto	Japan	(bronze) Junior Grand Prix Final (2017)	
Seiichi Suzuki	Japan	(bronze) World Junior Championships (1995)	
Juraj Sviatko	Slovakia	(gold) Slovak Championships (1998, 2000, 2002–04, 2006)	
Edgar Syers	Great Britain	(bronze) World Junior Championships (1899)	
Marek Sząszor	Poland	(gold) Polish Championships (1990, 1993)	
Andor Szende	Hungary	(gold) Hungarian Championships (1911–12, 1914, 1922)	
Andor Szende	Hungary	(silver) European Championships (1913)	
Andor Szende	Hungary	(bronze) World Championships (1910, 1912–13)	

== T ==
Skater	Nation	Major championships	Ref.
Daisuke Takahashi	Japan	(gold) World Championships (2010); Four Continents Championships (2008, 2011); Grand Prix Final (2012); Japan Championships (2006–08, 2010, 2012); World Junior Championships (2002)	
Daisuke Takahashi	Japan	(silver) World Championships (2007, 2012); Four Continents Championships (2012); Grand Prix Final (2006–07, 2011)	
Daisuke Takahashi	Japan	(bronze) Winter Olympics (2010); Four Continents Championships (2005); Grand Prix Final (2005)	
Yōsuke Takeuchi	Japan	(gold) Japan Championships (1999, 2002)	
Yōsuke Takeuchi	Japan	(bronze) World Junior Championships (1999)	
Yamato Tamura	Japan	(gold) Japan Championships (1998, 2004)	
Keiji Tanaka	Japan	(silver) World Junior Championships (2011)	
Jacek Tascher	Poland	(gold) Polish Championships (1973, 1975)	
Denis Ten	Kazakhstan	(gold) Four Continents Championships (2015); Kazakhstani Championships (2006, 2010, 2012–14)	
Denis Ten	Kazakhstan	(silver) World Championships (2013)	
Denis Ten	Kazakhstan	(bronze) Winter Olympics (2014); World Championships (2015)	
Elemér Terták	Hungary	(gold) Hungarian Championships (1937–39)	
Elemér Terták	Hungary	(bronze) World Championships (1937); European Championships (1934, 1937)	
Per Thorén	Sweden	(gold) European Championships (1911); Swedish Championships (1905, 1907)	
Per Thorén	Sweden	(silver) World Championships (1909)	
Per Thorén	Sweden	(bronze) Summer Olympics (1908); World Championships (1905); European Championships (1906, 1909–10)	
Charlie Tickner	United States	(gold) World Championships (1978); U.S. Championships (1977–80)	
Charlie Tickner	United States	(bronze) Winter Olympics (1980); World Championships (1980)	
Stanislav Timchenko	Russia	(gold) Junior Grand Prix Final (2001)	
Stanislav Timchenko	Russia	(bronze) World Junior Championships (2002); Junior Grand Prix Final (2000)	
Laurent Tobel	France	(gold) French Championships (1999)	
Nicola Todeschini	Switzerland	(gold) Swiss Championships (2015)	
Wouter Toledo	Netherlands	(gold) Dutch Championships (1958–64)	
Freddie Tomlins	Great Britain	(silver) World Championships (1939); European Championships (1939)	
Zoltán Tóth	Hungary	(gold) Hungarian Championships (2001, 2003–06)	
Michel Tsiba	Netherlands	(gold) Dutch Championships (2018)	
Tatsuya Tsuboi	Japan	(bronze) World Junior Championships (2022)	
Yuriy Tsymbalyuk	Soviet Union	(bronze) World Junior Championships (1986–88)	
Florian Tuma	Austria	(gold) Austrian Championships (1993–97)	
Konstantin Tupikov	Poland	(gold) Polish Championships (2008)	
Hristo Turlakov	Bulgaria	(gold) Bulgarian Championships (1991–92)	
Eugene Turner	United States	(gold) U.S. Championships (1940–41)	
Roger Turner	United States	(gold) U.S. Championships (1928–34)	
Roger Turner	United States	(silver) World Championships (1930–31)	

== U ==
Skater	Nation	Major championships	Ref.
Alper Uçar	Turkey	(gold) Turkish Championships (2005)	
Oskar Uhlig	Germany	(gold) European Championships (1891)	
Shoma Uno	Japan	(gold) World Championships (2022–23); Four Continents Championships (2019); Grand Prix Final (2022); Japan Championships (2017–20, 2023–24); World Junior Championships (2015); Junior Grand Prix Final (2014)	
Shoma Uno	Japan	(silver) Winter Olympics (2018, 2022); World Championships (2017–18); Four Continents Championships (2018); Grand Prix Final (2017–18, 2023); Winter Youth Olympics (2012)	
Shoma Uno	Japan	(bronze) Winter Olympics (2022); Four Continents Championships (2017); Grand Prix Final (2015–16)	
Gregor Urbas	Slovenia	(gold) Slovenian Championships (2001–10)	
Alexei Urmanov	Soviet Union	(gold) Soviet Championships (1992)	
Alexei Urmanov	Soviet Union	(silver) World Junior Championships (1990)	
Alexei Urmanov	CIS	(bronze) European Championships (1992)	
Alexei Urmanov	Russia	(gold) Winter Olympics (1994); European Championships (1997); Grand Prix Final (1995); Russian Championships (1993–96)	
Alexei Urmanov	Russia	(silver) European Championships (1995); Grand Prix Final (1998)	
Alexei Urmanov	Russia	(bronze) World Championships (1993); European Championships (1994, 1999); Grand Prix Final (1996)	
Alexander Uspenski	Russia	(bronze) Junior Grand Prix Final (2004)	

== V ==
Skater	Nation	Major championships	Ref.
Ed van Campen	Netherlands	(gold) Dutch Championships (1982–85)	
Kevin van der Perren	Belgium	(gold) Belgian Championships (2000–04, 2007, 2011–12)	
Kevin van der Perren	Belgium	(silver) World Junior Championships (2002)	
Kevin van der Perren	Belgium	(bronze) European Championships (2007, 2009); Junior Grand Prix Final (2001)	
Robert Van Zeebroeck	Belgium	(bronze) Winter Olympics (1928)	
Tigran Vardanjan	Hungary	(gold) Hungarian Championships (2007–09, 2011)	
Gegham Vardanyan	Armenia	(gold) Armenian Championships (2005)	
Alexei Vasilevsky	Russia	(bronze) Junior Grand Prix Final (1998)	
Deniss Vasiļjevs	Latvia	(gold) Latvian Championships (2016–18, 2020, 2023–25)	
Deniss Vasiļjevs	Latvia	(silver) Winter Youth Olympics (2016)	
Deniss Vasiļjevs	Latvia	(bronze) European Championships (2022)	
Arthur Vaughn Jr.	United States	(gold) U.S. Championships (1943)	
Tomáš Verner	Czech Republic	(gold) European Championships (2008); Czech Championships (2002–04, 2006–08, 2011–14)	
Tomáš Verner	Czech Republic	(silver) European Championships (2007)	
Tomáš Verner	Czech Republic	(bronze) European Championships (2011)	
Gilberto Viadana	Italy	(gold) Italian Championships (1992, 1997–98)	
Valtter Virtanen	Finland	(gold) Finnish Championships (2013, 2015–18, 2022–23, 2025)	
Gary Visconti	United States	(gold) U.S. Championships (1965, 1967)	
Gary Visconti	United States	(bronze) World Championships (1966–67)	
Andrejs Vlaščenko	Latvia	(gold) Latvian Championships (1992, 1994)	
Andrejs Vlaščenko	Germany	(gold) German Championships (1995–97, 1999)	
Sergey Volkov	Soviet Union	(gold) World Championships (1975); Soviet Championships (1974, 1976)	
Sergey Volkov	Soviet Union	(silver) World Championships (1974); European Championships (1974)	
Tibor von Földváry	Hungary	(gold) European Championships (1895)	
Tibor von Földváry	Hungary	(silver) European Championships (1892)	
Tibor von Földváry	Hungary	(bronze) European Championships (1894)	
Sergei Voronov	Russia	(gold) Russian Championships (2008–09)	
Sergei Voronov	Russia	(silver) European Championships (2014); World Junior Championships (2006)	
Sergei Voronov	Russia	(bronze) European Championships (2015); Grand Prix Final (2014); World Junior Championships (2007)	

== W ==
Skater	Nation	Major championships	Ref.
Stéphane Walker	Switzerland	(gold) Swiss Championships (2013–14, 2016–18)	
Mark Webster	Australia	(gold) Australian Championships (2011)	
Johnny Weir	United States	(gold) U.S. Championships (2004–06); World Junior Championships (2001)	
Johnny Weir	United States	(bronze) World Championships (2008); Grand Prix Final (2008–09)	
Michael Weiss	United States	(gold) U.S. Championships (1999–2000, 2003); World Junior Championships (1994)	
Michael Weiss	United States	(silver) World Junior Championships (1993)	
Michael Weiss	United States	(bronze) World Championships (1999–2000); Four Continents Championships (2001); Grand Prix Final (2003)	
Roger Wickson	Canada	(gold) Canadian Championships (1949–50)	
Matthew Wilkinson	South Africa	(gold) South African Championships (2006)	
Scott Williams	United States	(gold) World Junior Championships (1982)	
Scott Williams	United States	(bronze) World Junior Championships (1981)	
Montgomery Wilson	Canada	(gold) Canadian Championships (1929–35, 1938–39)	
Montgomery Wilson	Canada	(silver) World Championships (1932)	
Montgomery Wilson	Canada	(bronze) Winter Olympics (1932)	
Neil Wilson	Great Britain	(gold) British Championships (1997, 2000, 2003)	
Kornel Witkowski	Poland	(gold) Polish Championships (2021)	
Tim Wood	United States	(gold) World Championships (1969–70); U.S. Championships (1968–70)	
Tim Wood	United States	(silver) Winter Olympics (1968); World Championships (1968)	
Ludwig Wrede	Austria	(gold) Austrian Championships (1923)	
Ludwig Wrede	Austria	(silver) European Championships (1924)	
Ludwig Wrede	Austria	(bronze) World Championships (1929); European Championships (1929)	
Wu Jialiang	China	(gold) Chinese Championships (2008)	
Paul Wylie	United States	(gold) World Junior Championships (1981)	
Paul Wylie	United States	(silver) Winter Olympics (1992)	

== Y ==
Skater	Nation	Major championships	Ref.
Alexei Yagudin	Russia	(gold) Winter Olympics (2002); World Championships (1998–2000, 2002); European Championships (1998–99, 2002); Grand Prix Final (1998, 2001); World Junior Championships (1996)	
Alexei Yagudin	Russia	(silver) World Championships (2001); European Championships (2000–01); Grand Prix Final (2000)	
Alexei Yagudin	Russia	(bronze) World Championships (1997)	
Sōta Yamamoto	Japan	(gold) Winter Youth Olympics (2016)	
Sōta Yamamoto	Japan	(silver) Grand Prix Final (2022); Junior Grand Prix Final (2014)	
Sōta Yamamoto	Japan	(bronze) World Junior Championships (2015); Junior Grand Prix Final (2015)	
Yan Han	China	(gold) Chinese Championships (2010–11, 2018, 2020); Winter Youth Olympics (2012); World Junior Championships (2012)	
Yan Han	China	(silver) Junior Grand Prix Final (2010–11)	
Yan Han	China	(bronze) Four Continents Championships (2013, 2015–16)	
Nozomu Yoshioka	Japan	(bronze) World Junior Championships (2023); Junior Grand Prix Final (2022)	

== Z ==
Skater	Nation	Major championships	Ref.
Georg Zachariades	Austria	(gold) German Championships (1892–93)	
Georg Zachariades	Austria	(bronze) European Championships (1892–93)	
Vyacheslav Zahorodnyuk	Soviet Union	(gold) World Junior Championships (1989)	
Vyacheslav Zahorodnyuk	Soviet Union	(silver) World Junior Championships (1988)	
Vyacheslav Zahorodnyuk	Soviet Union	(bronze) European Championships (1990–91)	
Vyacheslav Zahorodnyuk	Ukraine	(gold) European Championships (1996); Ukrainian Figure Skating Championships (1995–98)	
Vyacheslav Zahorodnyuk	Ukraine	(silver) European Championships (1994)	
Vyacheslav Zahorodnyuk	Ukraine	(bronze) World Championships (1994); European Championships (1995, 1997)	
Bertalan Zakany	Hungary	(gold) Hungarian Championships (2002)	
Maurizio Zandron	Austria	(gold) Austrian Championships (2019–21, 2023–26)	
Karel Zelenka	Italy	(gold) Italian Championships (2003–07)	
Yakau Zenko	Belarus	(gold) Belarusian Championships (2018–19)	
Karl Zenger	Germany	(gold) German Championships (1897, 1905)	
Karl Zenger	Germany	(bronze) European Championships (1905)	
Zhang Min	China	(gold) Chinese Championships (1994, 2003, 2005)	
Zhang Min	China	(silver) Four Continents Championships (2003)	
Zhang Min	China	(bronze) Four Continents Championships (2000)	
Vincent Zhou	United States	(gold) Winter Olympics (2022); World Junior Championships (2017)	
Vincent Zhou	United States	(bronze) World Championships (2019, 2022); Four Continents Championships (2019)	
Franz Zilly	Germany	(bronze) European Championships (1891)	
Günter Zöller	East Germany	(gold) East German Championships (1965, 1967–70)	
Günter Zöller	East Germany	(bronze) World Championships (1970); European Championships (1970)	

== See also ==
- List of figure skaters (women's singles)
- List of figure skaters (pair skating)
- List of figure skaters (ice dance)
