= Bišćan =

Bišćan is a Croatian surname. It is derived from the demonym for the Bosnian city of Bihać. Notable people with the surname include:

- Darijo Biščan (born 1985), Croatian footballer
- Frank Biscan (1920−1959), American baseball player
- Igor Bišćan (born 1978), Croatian football manager and former player
- Tomislav Bišćan (born 1987), Croatian figure skater
