= Sofya Titova =

Russian–Armenian figure skater

- Titova at the 2023 Russian Grand Prix stage in Kazan

Personal information
- Native name: София Титова
- Born: 27 January 2009 (age 17) Moscow, Russia
- Home town: Yerevan, Armenia; Moscow, Russia
- Height: 155 cm (5 ft 1 in)

Figure skating career
- Country: Armenia (since 2024); Russia (until 2023)
- Coach: Evgeni Plushenko, Sergei Alexeev
- Skating club: Viktoria Skating School
- Began skating: 2013

Sofya Titova (Russian: Софья Титова, Armenian: Սոֆյա Տիտովա; born 27 January 2009) is a Russian-Armenian figure skater who currently competes for Armenia. Competing for Armenia, she is the 2025 Armenian Junior National champion.

Competing for Russia, she is the 2019–20 junior Moscow champion. She has performed the triple Axel and quadruple Salchow in domestic competition.

== Personal life ==
Sofya was born in Moscow, Russia on 27 January 2009. Her mother is a former figure skater.

== Career ==
=== Skating for Russia ===
==== Early career ====
Titova began skating at the age of four after her mother brought her to the rink before training with Irina Nifontova at CSKA. She trained at CSKA for four years before switching to train with Eteri Tutberidze whom asked her to leave the academy after two sessions. "I remember I went to the ice. Eteri Georgievna asked to jump a triple loop. And at that time I had no triple jumps at all – I only jumped double. Well, I under rotated it... She looked at it and immediately left... I was kicked out... Many weren't taken, they kicked them out. It turned out that in two seasons I did not jump ... Well, nothing. With what I came, with that I left."

Titova later began to train with Evgeni Plushenko at the Angels of Plushenko Academy during the 2018–19 season. She began to perform triple jumps, including the triple Axel.

At the 2020 Moscow Championships, Sofya won the gold medal on the junior level.

==== 2021–2022 season ====
Sofya competed at stages 1 and 3 of the Russian Cup, winning the gold medal in both competitions. In January, she placed 8th at the 2022 Russian Junior Championships. In February, she placed 8th at the Russian Cup Final.

Titova at the 2023 Russian Grand Prix stage in Kazan

==== 2022–2023 season ====
Sofya opened her season by competing at stages 1 and 3 of the Russian Cup, winning the gold medal in both competitions. She placed 4th at the 2023 Russian Junior Championships as well as the Russian Cup Final.

==== 2023–2024 season: Request to represent Armenia ====
Sofya competed at stage 2 of the Russian Cup where she won the bronze medal. She later went onto place 10th at stage 4.

In May 2024, it was announced that Titova requested to represent Armenia. The Figure Skating Federation of Russia approved her transfer request. The Armenian Figure Skating Federation has not confirmed yet the transition of Sofia Titova. "Our federation has no information on Titova's change of citizenship. We know nothing about this", said the president of the Armenian Figure Skating Federation, Melania Stepanyan.

Titova's citizenship was later approved. "The issue of Titova's Armenian citizenship has been resolved. The figure skater can legally represent Armenia," the Armenian Federation said.

=== Skating for Armenia ===
==== 2024–2025 season ====
Sofya made her debut for Armenia at the junior national championships in December 2024 where she won the gold medal. She later won the bronze medal at the 2025 Volvo Open behind Kira Baranovska and Iida Karhunen. Titova additionally earned her technical minimums for the upcoming Junior World Championships.

At the 2025 World Junior Championships, Sofya placed 20th overall with a total score of 159.79.

==== 2025–2026 season ====
Titova was assigned to two competitions on the ISU Junior Grand Prix. She made her JGP debut in September in Italy finishing in 16th place overall. In October she competed at the JGP in Abu Dhabi placing 24th overall.

== Programs ==
Season	Short program	Free skating
2025–2026	The Man Who Drew God; by Guiliano Taviani and Carmelo Travia choreo. by Dmitrii Mikhailov	El Tango De Roxanne; by Machina Del Tango, Anna Derezowska, Sting, Mariano Martinez choreo. by Dmitrii Mikhailov
2024–2025	The Man Who Drew God; by Guiliano Taviani and Carmelo Travia choreo. by Dmitrii Mikhailov	El Tango De Roxanne; by Machina Del Tango, Anna Derezowska, Sting, Mariano Martinez choreo. by Dmitrii Mikhailov
2023–2024	Derniere Danse; by Indila	Moonlight Sonata; by Beethoven
2022–2023	Csárdás; by Vittorio Monti	Hidden Citizens; by Rånya: Paint It Black; by The Rolling Stones
2021–2022	Не отрекаются, любя; by Alla Pugacheva	Pirates of the Caribbean (Soundtrack); by Hans Zimmer and Klaus Badelt
2020–2021	Sing, Sing, Sing; by Benny Goodman	Je Suis Malade; by Lara Fabian
2019–2020		Schindler's List; by John Williams

== Competitive highlights ==
- JGP – Event of the ISU Junior Grand Prix Series

=== Single skating (for Armenia) ===
Competition placements at junior level
Season	2024-25	2025-26
World Junior Championships	20th	
Armenian Championships	1st	
JGP Italy		16th
JGP United Arab Emirates		24th
Volvo Open Cup	3rd	

=== Single skating (for Russia) ===
Competition placements at junior level
Season	2021-22	2022–23	2023–24
Russian Championships	8th	4th	
Russian JGP Final	8th	4th	
Russian JGP Stage 1	1st	1st	
Russian JGP Stage 2			3rd
Russian JGP Stage 3	1st	1st	
Russian JGP Stage 4			10th

== Detailed results ==
=== Single skating (for Armenia) ===
ISU personal best scores in the +5/-5 GOE System
Segment	Type	Score	Event
Total	TSS	159.79	2025 World Junior Championships
Short program	TSS	55.13	2025 World Junior Championships
Short program	TES	32.81	2025 World Junior Championships
Short program	PCS	23.60	2026 JGP Italy
Free skating	TSS	104.66	2025 World Junior Championships
Free skating	TES	55.19	2025 World Junior Championships
Free skating	PCS	49.47	2025 World Junior Championships

Results in the 2024-25 season
Date	Event	SP		FS		Total	
Date	Event	P	Score	P	Score	P	Score
Dec 18-19, 2024	(Armenia) 2025 Armenian Championships	1	62.02	1	119.91	1	181.93
Jan 16-19, 2025	(Latvia) 2025 Volvo Open Cup	3	58.97	4	102.67	3	161.64
Feb 24 - Mar 2, 2025	(Hungary) 2025 World Junior Championships	20	55.13	20	104.66	20	159.79

Results in the 2025-26 season
Date	Event	SP		FS		Total	
Date	Event	P	Score	P	Score	P	Score
Sep 3-6, 2025	2025 JGP Italy	15	53.10	14	92.84	16	145.92
Oct 8-11, 2025	2025 JGP United Arab Emirates	28	39.17	23	78.98	24	118.15
