= Jenna McCorkell =

British figure skater

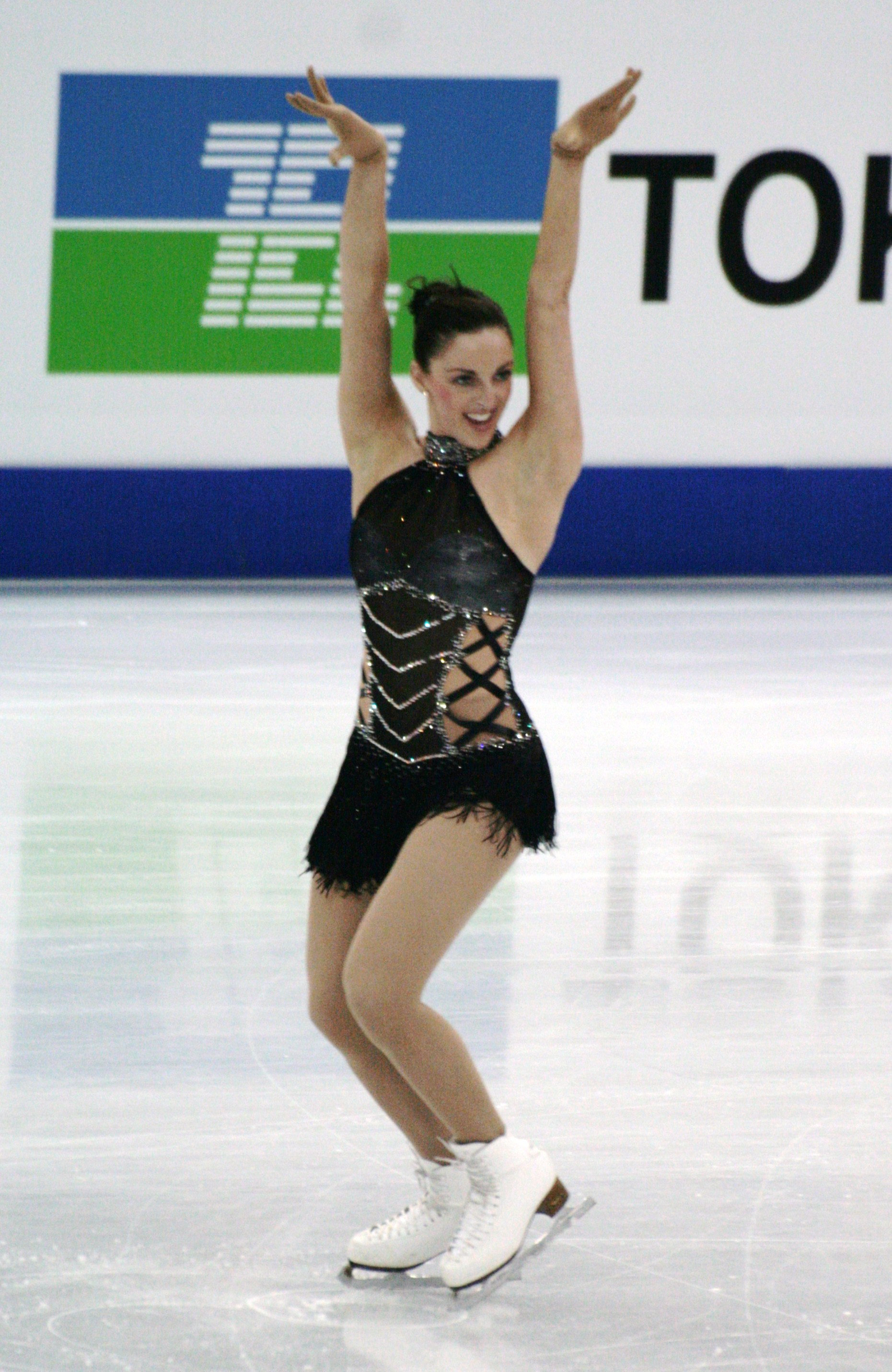
- McCorkell in 2012

Personal information
- Born: 15 September 1986 (age 40) Coleraine, County Londonderry, Northern Ireland
- Height: 165 cm (5 ft 5 in)

Figure skating career
- Country: Great Britain
- Coach: Simon Briggs, Debbie Briggs, Yuri Bureiko, Silvie De Rijcke, Vera Vandecaveye, Marina Serova, Margaret O'Neill
- Skating club: Liedekerke
- Began skating: 1994
- Retired: 29 March 2014
Medal record
British Championships
Gold medal – first place	2008 Sheffield	Singles
Gold medal – first place	2009 Nottingham	Singles
Gold medal – first place	2010 Sheffield	Singles
Gold medal – first place	2011 Sheffield	Singles
Gold medal – first place	2012 Sheffield	Singles
Gold medal – first place	2013 Sheffield	Singles
Gold medal – first place	2014 Sheffield	Singles

Jenna McCorkell (born 15 September 1986) is a former figure skater from Northern Ireland. She is an eleven-time British national champion (2003–05; 2007–14) and won seven senior international medals, including gold at the Ondrej Nepela Memorial and Ice Challenge. She placed as high as eighth at the European Championships (2008) and 14th at the World Championships (2010, 2012), and competed at two Winter Olympics (2010, 2014).

== Personal life ==
McCorkell was born on 15 September 1986 in Coleraine, County Londonderry, Northern Ireland. She married Belgian skater Kevin van der Perren in May 2008. The couple lives in Coleraine, Northern Ireland and have a son named Ben, born in 2019.

== Career ==
McCorkell trained in Belfast, coached by Margaret McAllister and Yuri Bureiko, until the end of the 2001–02 season. In the 2002–03 season, she moved to Coventry where she was coached by Bureiko.

McCorkell competed three times, from 2002 to 2004, at the World Junior Championships, placing as high as 11th in 2003. She made her senior World and European Championships debut also in 2003.

Following the 2005–06 season, McCorkell moved to Liedekerke, Belgium where she was coached by Vera Vandecaveye.

McCorkell achieved her career-best European Championships result, 8th, in 2008. After the 2007–08 season, she rejoined Juri Bureiko and was also coached by Silvie De Rijcke. Her best Worlds finish, 14th, came in 2010 and 2012.

McCorkell changed coaches in April 2011. She decided to train with coach Simon Briggs in Ninove and Dundee. McCorkell had a torn abductor muscle at the end of 2012.

In February 2014, McCorkell competed at her second Winter Olympics. Ranked 25th in the short program, she did not advance to the free skate in Sochi, Russia. At the 2014 World Championships in Saitama, Japan, McCorkell qualified for the free skate but withdrew due to a hamstring injury.

== Post–competitive career ==
After Jenna's retirement, she became a coach and began a clothing brand named "Chique Sport", designing a sportswear collection specifically for figure skaters. The clothing brand was launched at the 2017 World Figure Skating Championships and rapidly gained recognition, receiving support from top skaters across the globe.

== Programs ==
Season	Short program	Free skating
2013–14	Imagined Oceans by Karl Jenkins	Evita by Andrew Lloyd Webber
2012–13	Imagined Oceans by Karl Jenkins	Where Have All The Flowers Gone
2011–12	Capone (from "Celtic Tiger") by Ronan Hardiman	Where Have All The Flowers Gone
2009–11	Totentanz by Franz Liszt arranged by Maksim Mrvica	Voice of Violin performed by Joshua Bell; Allegro from Music for Strings by April G. Faure
2008–09	Harem by Sarah Brightman	Cirque du Soleil; Journey of Man; Selection
2007–08	Harem by Sarah Brightman	Frida by Elliot Goldenthal
2006–07	1001 Nights	Frida by Elliot Goldenthal
2004–05	Meditation from Thais by Jules Massenet	Swan Lake by Pyotr Ilyich Tchaikovsky
2003–04	Poeme by Secret Garden	Toccata and Fugue in D-Minor (modern version) by Johann Sebastian Bach; Storm (from Four Seasons by Vivaldi) both performed by Vanessa-Mae
2002–03	Piano Concerto No. 1 by Pyotr Ilyich Tchaikovsky performed by Richard Clayderman	Xotica (from Holiday on Ice) by René Dupéré
2001–02	Time to Say Goodbye by Andrea Bocelli	Legends of the Fall by James Horner; Antz; Pearl Harbor by Hans Zimmer; The Mask of Zorro by James Horner

== Competitive highlights ==
GP: Grand Prix; JGP: Junior Grand Prix

=== 2001–present ===
International
Event	01–02	02–03	03–04	04–05	05–06	06–07	07–08	08–09	09–10	10–11	11–12	12–13	13–14
Olympics									29th				25th
Worlds		21st	24th	22nd			25th	20th	14th	24th	14th	20th	WD
Europeans		19th	14th	16th		15th	8th	9th	14th	14th	18th	21st	24th
GP Cup of China				6th									
GP Rostelecom Cup									8th				
GP France			8th									8th	
GP NHK Trophy						11th				11th			
GP Skate America										10th			
GP Skate Canada				8th				7th	10th				
Cup of Nice											8th		6th
Finlandia Trophy			10th	10th			9th	6th	5th				
Golden Spin						12th	13th	3rd			4th		
Ice Challenge												1st	
Karl Schäfer					21st								
Nebelhorn Trophy		9th			6th			5th		5th			
NRW Trophy									3rd				
Ondrej Nepela				2nd			3rd				5th	1st	15th
Volvo Open Cup													2nd
International: Junior
Junior Worlds	12th	11th	13th										
JGP Germany		3rd											
JGP Italy	5th	8th											
JGP Sweden	6th												
National
British Champ.		1st	1st	1st		1st	1st	1st	1st	1st	1st	1st	1st
Team events
Olympics													10th T 10th P
WD = Withdrew

=== 1996–2000 ===
National
Event	96–97	97–98	98–99	99–00
British Championships	2nd N	9th J	20th	11th
Levels: N = Novice; J = Junior
