= Yuri Bureiko =

Soviet figure skater

Yuri Bureiko (born 21 June 1967) is a former competitive figure skater who represented the Soviet Union. He is the 1981 World Junior silver medalist.

After retiring from competition, Bureiko performed in various ice shows in "Hot Ice" in Blackpool, England. After being skating director in Romford and head coach of free skating in National Ice centre in Nottingham he opened his own school of skating ("International School of Skating") in partnership with biggest ice rink operating company in Europe - Planet Ice. Today ISS is located in Coventry and Milton Keynes. The school has been involved in short term projects with Cardiff, Altrincham, Cannock and Uttoxeter ice rinks. The success of his students led him to be awarded with highest Level 5 coaching category in the UK. In 2003, he was named British Figure Skating Coach of the year. He has coached Jenna McCorkell, Taras Rajec, Dean Timmins, Edward Ka-yin Chow Matthew Wilkinson, Kevin van der Perren, Natasha McKay, David Richardson, Jason Thompson, Elliot Hilton, Damian Ostojic, and Phillip Harris. His students became national champions of UK, Belgium, The Netherlands, Slovakia, Kazakhstan and Hong Kong. At 2010 Vancouver Olympic Games he represented United Kingdom and Belgium with two of his students: Jenna McCorkell, and Kevin van der Perren,.
