= Gegham Vardanyan =

Armenian figure skater (born 1988)

Personal information
- Full name: Gegham Vardanyan
- Born: 29 March 1988 (age 38) Yerevan, Armenian SSR, Soviet Union
- Height: 168 cm (5.51 ft)

Figure skating career
- Country: Armenia
- Coach: Armen Asoyan
- Skating club: Shengavit

Gegham Vardanyan (Armenian: Գեղամ Վարդանյան; born 29 March 1988 in Yerevan, Armenia) is an Armenian figure skater. He is the 2005 Armenian national champion.

== Results ==
| Event | 2003 | 2004 | 2005 | 2006 | 2007 | 2008 | 2009 |
|---|---|---|---|---|---|---|---|
| World Championships | | | | | | | 48th |
| European Championships | | | | | | | 39th |
| Armenian Championships | 2nd | 2nd | 1st | | | | |
