= Semen Daniliants =

Russian figure skater

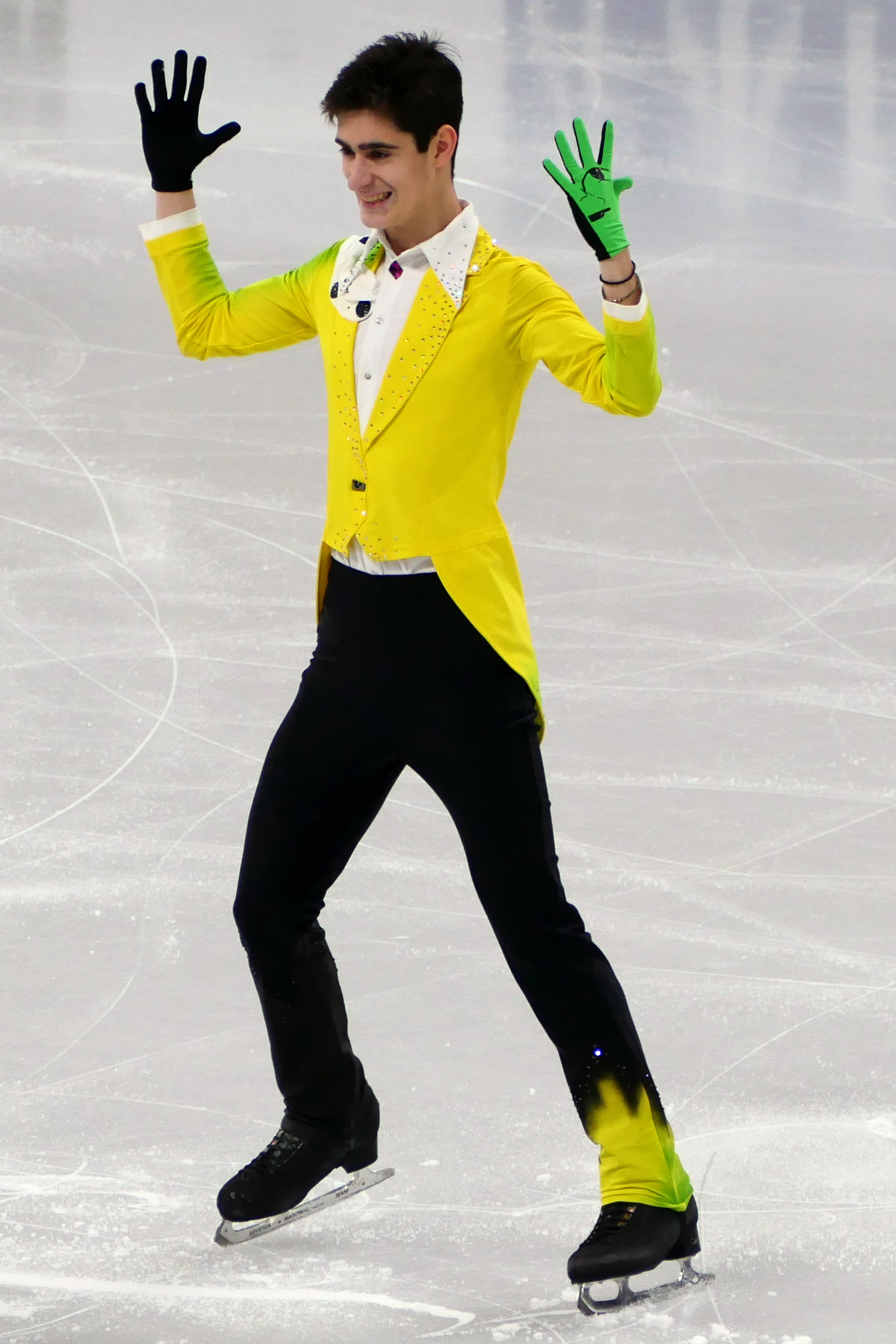
- Daniliants at the 2024 World Championships

Personal information
- Native name: Семён Эдуардович Данильянц
- Full name: Semen Eduardovich Daniliants
- Other names: Semyon; Simon
- Born: 15 November 2006 (age 19) Moscow, Russia
- Home town: Moscow
- Height: 1.80 m (5 ft 11 in)

Figure skating career
- Country: Armenia (since 2021); Russia (until 2020)
- Discipline: Men's singles
- Coach: Alexei Vasilevsky; Yulia Lavrenchuk
- Skating club: Evolution
- Began skating: 2010

Medal record
Armenian Championships
| Gold medal – first place | 2025 Yerevan | Singles |
| Gold medal – first place | 2026 Yerevan | Singles |

Semen Eduardovich Daniliants (Russian: Семён Эдуардович Данильянц, Armenian: Սեմյոն Էդուարդի Դանիլյանց; born 15 November 2006) is a Russian-born figure skater who currently represents Armenia. He is the 2023 Abu Dhabi Trophy champion and a two-time Armenian national champion (2025–26).

== Programs ==
| Season | Short program | Free skating |
|---|---|---|
| 2025–2026 | Vreir Astuahs by Artur Meschian ft. Ari Zakarian choreo. by Martine Dagenais | Creep; Sinner Man (from Lucifer) performed by Tom Ellis choreo. by Martine Dagenais, Dmitri Zykin |
| 2024–2025 | Natural by Imagine Dragons choreo. by Martine Dagenais, Dmitri Zykin | Creep; Sinner Man (from Lucifer) performed by Tom Ellis choreo. by Martine Dagenais, Dmitri Zykin |
| 2023–2024 | Cuban Pete by Jim Carrey; Hey! Pachuco! (from The Mask) by Royal Crown Revue choreo. by Martine Dagenais, Dmitri Zykin | Peaky Blinders: Red Right Hand; Brother, My Cup is Empty by Nick Cave and the Bad Seeds choreo. by Martine Dagenais, Dmitri Zykin |
| 2022–2023 | Cuban Pete by Jim Carrey; Hey! Pachuco! (from The Mask) by Royal Crown Revue choreo. by Martine Dagenais, Dmitri Zykin | Perfect by Ed Sheeran choreo. by Martine Dagenais, Dmitri Zykin |
| 2021–2022 | Tango in Ebony by Maksim Mrvica choreo. by Martine Dagenais, Dmitri Zykin | Perfect by Ed Sheeran choreo. by Martine Dagenais, Dmitri Zykin |

== Competitive highlights ==
=== For Armenia ===
- JGP – Event of the ISU Junior Grand Prix Series
- CS – Event of the ISU Challenger Series
- TBD – Assigned

Competition placements at senior level
| Season | 2022–23 | 2023–24 | 2024–25 | 2025–26 |
|---|---|---|---|---|
| World Championships | | 22nd | 37th | 26th |
| European Championships | | | 17th | |
| Armenian Championships | | | 1st | 1st |
| CS Cranberry Cup | | | | 13th |
| CS Denis Ten Memorial | 7th | 5th | 5th | 10th |
| CS Golden Spin of Zagreb | 15th | | | |
| Abu Dhabi Classic | 1st | 2nd | | |
| Asian Open Trophy | | | 7th | |
| Bosphorus Cup | | 6th | | |
| Icebeat Winter Trophy | | 1st | | |
| Skate to Milano | | | | 11th |

Competition placements at junior level
| Season | 2020–21 | 2021–22 | 2022–23 | 2023–24 |
|---|---|---|---|---|
| World Junior Championships | | 25th | 37th | |
| Armenian Championships | 1st | | | |
| JGP Armenia | | | | 6th |
| JGP Poland | | 11th | 22nd | |
| EYEOF | | | 4th | |
| Icelab International Cup | | 2nd | | |
| Santa Claus Cup | | 3rd | | |

== Detailed results ==
ISU personal best scores in the +5/-5 GOE System
| Segment | Type | Score | Event |
|---|---|---|---|
| Total | TSS | 216.89 | 2024 CS Denis Ten Memorial Challenge |
| Short program | TSS | 74.43 | 2025 CS Denis Ten Memorial Challenge |
| Short program | TES | 41.31 | 2024 World Championships |
| Short program | PCS | 33.98 | 2025 CS Denis Ten Memorial Challenge |
| Free skating | TSS | 143.19 | 2024 CS Denis Ten Memorial Challenge |
| Free skating | TES | 76.93 | 2024 CS Denis Ten Memorial Challenge |
| Free skating | PCS | 68.93 | 2023 CS Denis Ten Memorial Challenge |

Results in the 2024–25 season
| Date | Event | SP | | FS | | Total | |
| Date | Event | P | Score | P | Score | P | Score |
|---|---|---|---|---|---|---|---|
| Sep 2–6, 2024 | (Hong Kong) 2024 Asian Open Trophy | 4 | 79.55 | 8 | 122.42 | 7 | 201.97 |
| Oct 3–5, 2024 | (Kazakhstan) 2024 CS Denis Ten Memorial Challenge | 4 | 73.70 | 6 | 143.19 | 5 | 216.89 |
| Dec 18–19, 2024 | (Armenia) 2025 Armenian Championships | 1 | 87.86 | 1 | 140.15 | 1 | 228.01 |
| Jan 28 – Feb 2, 2025 | (Estonia) 2025 European Championships | 19 | 69.26 | 18 | 128.71 | 17 | 197.97 |
| Mar 24–30, 2025 | (United States) 2025 World Championships | 37 | 50.58 | —N/a | —N/a | 37 | 50.58 |

Results in the 2025–26 season
| Date | Event | SP | | FS | | Total | |
| Date | Event | P | Score | P | Score | P | Score |
|---|---|---|---|---|---|---|---|
| Aug 7–10, 2025 | (United States) 2025 CS Cranberry Cup International | 12 | 66.22 | 12 | 121.26 | 13 | 187.48 |
| Sep 18–21, 2025 | (China) 2025 ISU Skate to Milano | 17 | 63.59 | 10 | 136.41 | 11 | 200.00 |
| Oct 1–4, 2025 | (Kazakhstan) 2025 CS Denis Ten Memorial Challenge | 10 | 74.43 | 11 | 134.95 | 10 | 209.38 |
| Dec 12-13, 2025 | (Armenia) 2026 Armenian Championships | 1 | 56.57 | 1 | 118.84 | 1 | 175.41 |
| Mar 24–29, 2026 | (Czech Republic) 2026 World Championships | 26 | 70.94 | —N/a | —N/a | 26 | 70.94 |
