= Aramais Grigorian =

Armenian figure skater

Personal information
- Full name: Aramais Grigorian
- Born: March 31, 1973 (age 53) Yerevan
- Height: 1.73 m (5 ft 8 in)

Figure skating career
- Country: Armenia
- Skating club: Shengavid, Yerevan

Aramais Grigorian (Armenian: Արամայիս Գրիգորյան, born March 31, 1973) is an Armenian figure skater. He is the 2003-2004 Armenian national champion.

== Competitive highlights ==
Event	1995–1996	2001–2002	2002–2003	2003–2004
World Championships	17th QR.		39th	
European Championships	12th QR.	35th	30th	
Armenian Championships			1st	1st

- QR = Qualifying round
