= Kevin van der Perren =

Belgian figure skater (born 1982)

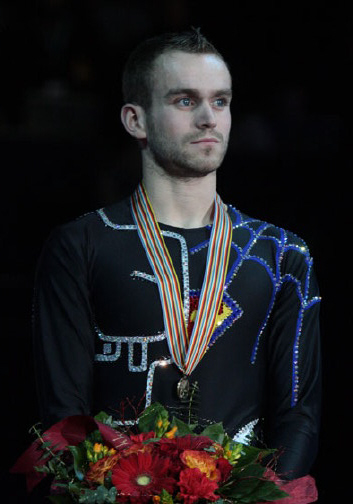
- Kevin van der Perren in 2009.

Personal information
- Born: 6 August 1982 (age 44) Ninove, Belgium
- Height: 1.77 m (5 ft 9 1/2 in)

Figure skating career
- Country: Belgium
- Skating club: KSC Heuvelkouter, Liedekerke
- Began skating: 1991
- Retired: April 2, 2012
Medal record
Representing Belgium
Figure skating: Men's singles
European Championships
Bronze medal – third place	2009 Helsinki	Men's singles
Bronze medal – third place	2007 Warsaw	Men's singles
World Junior Championships
Silver medal – second place	2002 Hamar	Men's singles
Junior Grand Prix Final
Bronze medal – third place	2001–02 Bled	Men's singles

Kevin van der Perren (born 6 August 1982) is a Belgian former competitive figure skater. He is the 2007 & 2009 European bronze medalist, a three-time Grand Prix medalist, and an eight-time (2000–2004, 2007, 2011, 2012) Belgian national champion. Van der Perren was the flagbearer for Belgium at the 2006 and 2010 Winter Olympics.

== Personal life ==
Kevin van der Perren was born on 6 August 1982 in Ninove, Belgium. He married British skater Jenna McCorkell on 17 May 2008. The couple lives in Coleraine, Northern Ireland and have a son named Ben, born in 2019. A second son was born in 2024 .

== Career ==
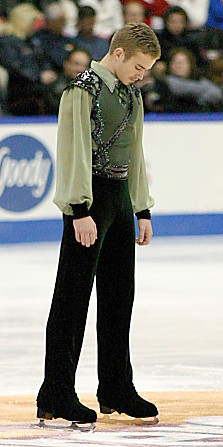
Van der Perren in 2003

Van der Perren became interested in figure skating after a traveling ice show came to his town to perform. Although his parents wanted him to play soccer and he was teased by his classmates at school, he refused to give up his dream of being an elite figure skater.

=== 2001–02 to 2004–05 ===
Making his first Olympic appearance, van der Perren finished 12th at the 2002 Winter Olympics in Salt Lake City, Utah. At the 2002 World Junior Championships, he won the silver medal and also became the first skater to land a three jump combination, consisting of a 3S-3T-3L. He included this combination in his free program until the end of the 2003–04 season.

=== 2005–06 season ===
In November 2005, van der Perren sustained a back injury. He was the flagbearer for Belgium at the 2006 Winter Olympics in Turin, Italy, where he finished 9th. He withdrew from the 2006 World Championships due to a hip injury he sustained after the Olympics.

=== 2006–07 season: First European bronze medal ===
Van der Perren considered not going to the 2007 European Championships, but in the end he participated and finished on the podium, after edging Sergei Davydov by 0.07 for the bronze. This made him the first Belgian singles skater to win a medal at Europeans since 1947. He missed the 2007 World Championships after re-injuring his back a week before the event when he slipped on back crossovers and fell into a barrier. He trained in Belgium and also Coventry, England, due to ice being expensive in his native country.

=== 2007–08 season ===
In the 2007–08 season, van der Perren was assigned to the 2007 Skate Canada and the 2007 Trophée Eric Bompard as his Grand Prix events. He finished second at Skate Canada, where he won the free skate, and fourth at Trophee Eric Bompard, qualifying him for the Grand Prix Final. He then finished 6th at the Grand Prix Final and 5th at Europeans. At the 2008 Worlds, van der Perren finished 9th in the SP and 3rd in the LP for 6th place overall. He underwent hip surgery shortly afterward.

=== 2008–09 season: Second European bronze medal ===
Van der Perren returned to competition at the start of the 2008–09 season. After being forced to withdraw from two events, he finished 5th at the 2008 Cup of Russia. Despite skating with a painful hip injury, Van der Perren won the bronze medal at the 2009 European Championships, his second medal at Europeans.

=== 2009–10 season ===
In the 2009–10 season, van der Perren competed at the Finlandia Trophy where he took a hard fall on his injured hip but completed the competition. He finished 11th at the European Championships. He was the flagbearer for Belgium at the 2010 Winter Olympics in Vancouver, Canada. He finished 17th at his third Olympics. At the 2010 World Championships, he finished 8th after a free skate in which he landed a 4T-3T-3T combination; he was the first skater ever to have performed this in competition. Van der Perren later said that he had never done this combination followed by a 3A in practice, and that he had skated in honor of his grandfather, who died the night before the free skate.

=== 2010–11 season ===
Although he had considered retirement following the 2009–10 season, van der Perren decided to continue through the 2011 European Championships, where he finished 4th. He decided to change coaches from Yuri Bureiko to Sylvie De Rijcke and continue on. He competed at the 2011 World Championships, where he finished in 17th place.

=== 2011–12 season ===
Van der Perren won the silver medal at the 2011 Skate America after finishing first in the free skating, equaling his best showing on the Grand Prix circuit. It was the third Grand Prix medal of his career. He stated that the 2012 European Championships would be his final event. He was forced to withdraw from the 2012 Europeans prior to the free skating due to a wrist injury. Van der Perren later announced via his website that the injury was not a fracture but a ligament strain, and that he hoped to be able to compete at the 2012 World Championships in Nice, France. He finished 15th at the World Championships after placing 18th in the short program and 10th in the free skate, for which he received a standing ovation. He then retired from competition.

=== Post-competitive career ===
Van der Perren is a full-time coach in Belgium as well as running a skating show, Ice Fantillusion, with his wife. In September 2012, van der Perren said that he was discussing training in pair skating.

In October 2012, van der Perren began training for the 5th edition of Sterren Op De Dansvloer (Belgium's Dancing with the Stars) with partner Charissa van Dipte and debuted on the show in November. In January 2013, they were named as the champions.

== Jumping ability ==
Van der Perren is the first Belgian skater to land a quadruple jump (toe loop) in competition, and the first skater ever to have done a 4T-3T-3T combination in competition. At the 2005 World Championships, he completed a 3F-3T-3Lo combination in his free program, although he touched down with his hand on the final jump. Van der Perren landed the combination again at the 2008 Worlds, this time with no touchdown.

== Programs ==
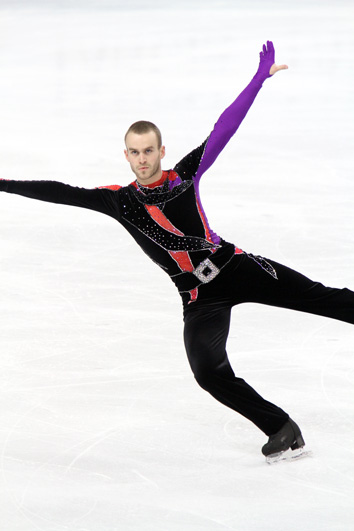
Van der Perren at the 2010 World Championships

Season	Short program	Free skating	Exhibition
2011–12	The Feeling Begins by Peter Gabriel; Incantation from Quidam (Cirque du Soleil) choreo. by Lorna Brown	The Man in the Iron Mask by Nick Glennie-Smith choreo. by Lorna Brown	
2010–11	Art of War (based on Prokofiev's Romeo and Juliet) performed by Vanessa-Mae choreo. by Shanetta Folle	Reflections of Earth by Gavin Greenaway choreo. by Diana Goolsbey	Fairytale by Alexander Rybak
2009–10	Night on Bald Mountain by Modest Mussorgsky choreo. by Yuri Bureiko; Tanguera by Astor Piazzolla choreo. by Yuri Bureiko	Reflections of Earth by Gavin Greenaway choreo. by Diana Goolsbey; Pirates of the Caribbean: Dead Man's Chest by Hans Zimmer choreo. by Yuri Bureiko	Robin Hood
2008–09	Night on Bald Mountain by Modest Mussorgsky choreo. by Yuri Bureiko	Heroes in Action by Safri Duo choreo. by Yuri Bureiko	
2007–08	Xotica by Rene Dupere choreo. by Yuri Bureiko; Heartbeat by Safri Duo choreo. by Yuri Bureiko	Episode 2 by Safri Duo choreo. by Yuri Bureiko; Lawrence of Arabia by Maurice Jarre choreo. by Yuri Bureiko	
2006–07	Adagio in G minor by Remo Giazotto, Tomaso Albinoni choreo. by Diana Goolsbey	Pirates of the Caribbean by Klaus Badelt, Hans Zimmer choreo. by Diana Goolsbey; Reflections of Earth by Gavin Greenaway choreo. by Diana Goolsbey	El Tango de Roxanne (from Moulin Rouge!) by Mariano Mores performed by Ewan McGregor choreo. by Diana Goolsbey
2005–06	Computer Game: Samba-Adagio by Safri Duo choreo. by Diana Goolsbey	Pirates of the Caribbean by Klaus Badelt, Hans Zimmer choreo. by Diana Goolsbey	Fever; Sway by Michael Bublé
2004–05	Everything by Safri Duo	Robin Hood: Prince of Thieves by Michael Kamen; Lawrence of Arabia by Maurice Jarre	The Matrix
2003–04	Tanguera by Astor Piazzolla choreo. by Nikolai Morozov	Robin Hood: Prince of Thieves by Michael Kamen choreo. by Kevin van der Perren	The Age of Cathedrals (from Notre-Dame de Paris)
2002–03	Romeo and Juliet by Sergei Prokofiev performed by Vanessa-Mae choreo. by Nikolai Morozov; Jazz choreo. by Nikolai Morozov	The Mask of Zorro by James Horner choreo. by Nikolai Morozov	Maria (from West Side Story); Grease Lightning; Samson and Delilah; Quidam (from Cirque du Soleil)
2001–02	The Tango Lesson choreo. by Diana Goolsbey, Sandra Schär	Trouble Man by Marvin Gaye choreo. by Diana Goolsbey, Sandra Schär	
2000–01	Reflection of Earth choreo. by Christelle Damman, Paul Oushasmay	Rhapsody in Blue by George Gershwin choreo. by Christelle Damman, Paul Oushasmay	

== Competitive highlights ==
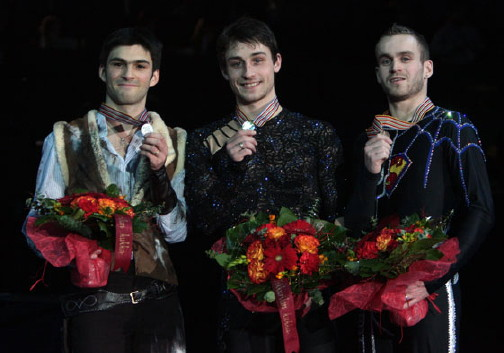
Van der Perren and the other medalists at the 2009 Europeans

GP: Grand Prix; JGP: Junior Grand Prix

International
Event	98–99	99–00	00–01	01–02	02–03	03–04	04–05	05–06	06–07	07–08	08–09	09–10	10–11	11–12
Olympics				12th				9th				17th		
Worlds		31st	33rd	14th	19th	14th	8th			6th	14th	8th	17th	15th
Europeans		28th	23rd	13th	10th	11th	6th	7th	3rd	5th	3rd	11th	4th	WD
GP Final						4th				6th				
GP Bompard						2nd				4th				
GP NHK Trophy								5th	6th				8th	
GP Rostelecom											6th	5th		
GP Skate Canada						5th	5th			2nd		11th		8th
GP Skate America								4th	4th				6th	2nd
Finlandia					4th					3rd	WD	12th		
Golden Spin				2nd										
Nebelhorn			15th								WD		5th	
Nepela Memorial			6th	9th		4th	2nd	2nd		1st				2nd
NRW Trophy											1st	3rd		
International: Junior
Junior Worlds		26th	16th	2nd										
JGP Final				3rd										
JGP Czech Rep.				2nd										
JGP Japan		14th												
JGP Netherlands		13th		1st										
JGP Norway			11th											
Gardena	9th J.													
National
Belgian Champ.	2nd	1st	1st	1st	1st	1st			1st				1st	1st
J. = Junior level; WD = Withdrew

Olympic Games
Preceded by Simon Van Vossel	Flagbearer for Belgium; Turin 2006; Vancouver 2010	Succeeded by Hanna Mariën
