= Armenian Figure Skating Championships =

Recurring figure skating competition

- Status: Active
- Genre: National championships
- Frequency: Annual
- Location: Yerevan
- Country: Armenia
- Organizer: Figure Skating Federation of Armenia

The Armenian Figure Skating Championships are an annual figure skating competition organized by the Figure Skating Federation of Armenia to crown the national champions of Armenia. Medals are awarded in men's singles, women's singles, pair skating, and ice dance at the senior and junior levels, although every discipline may not necessarily be held every year due to a lack of participants.

== Senior medalists ==
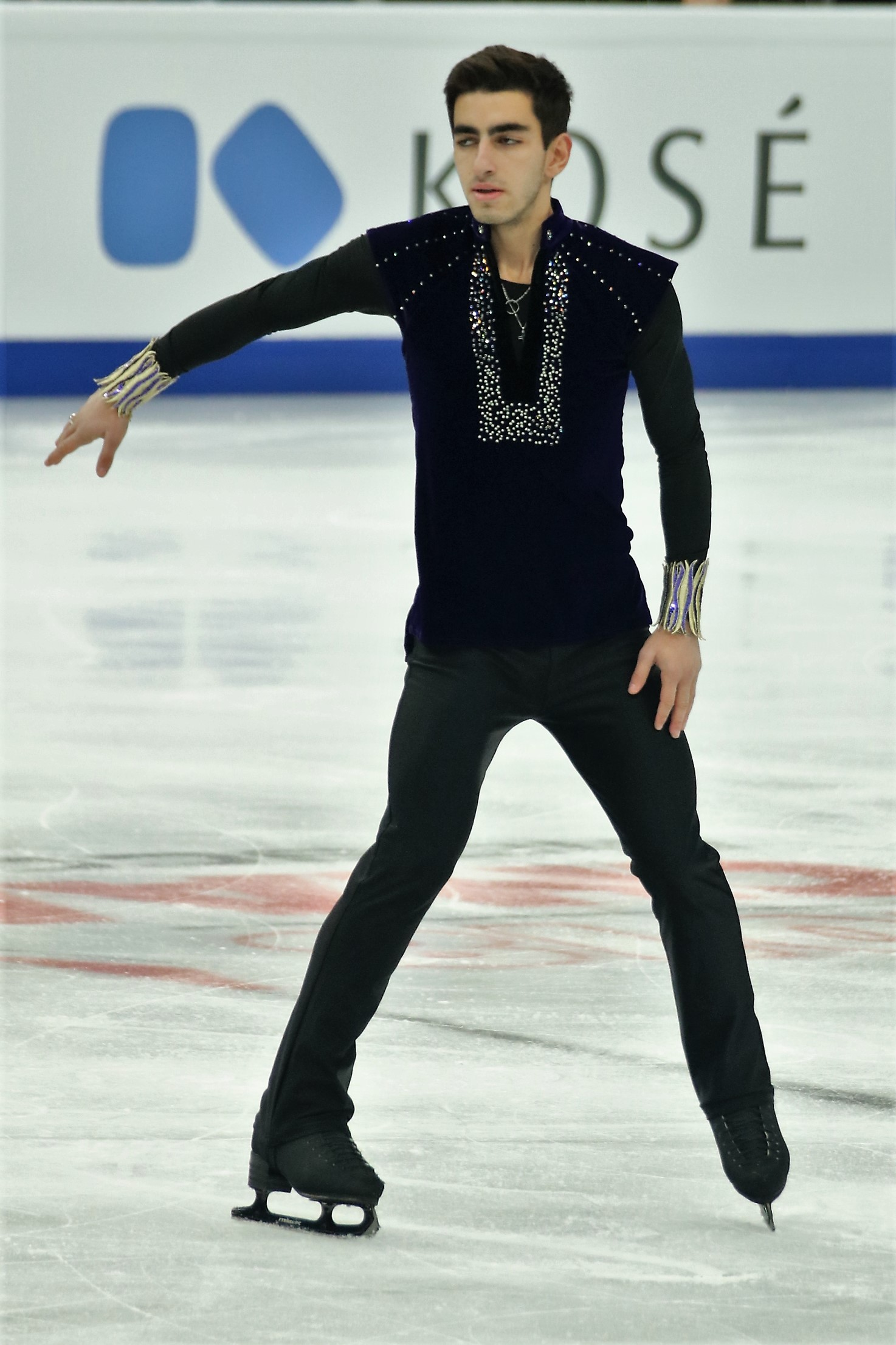
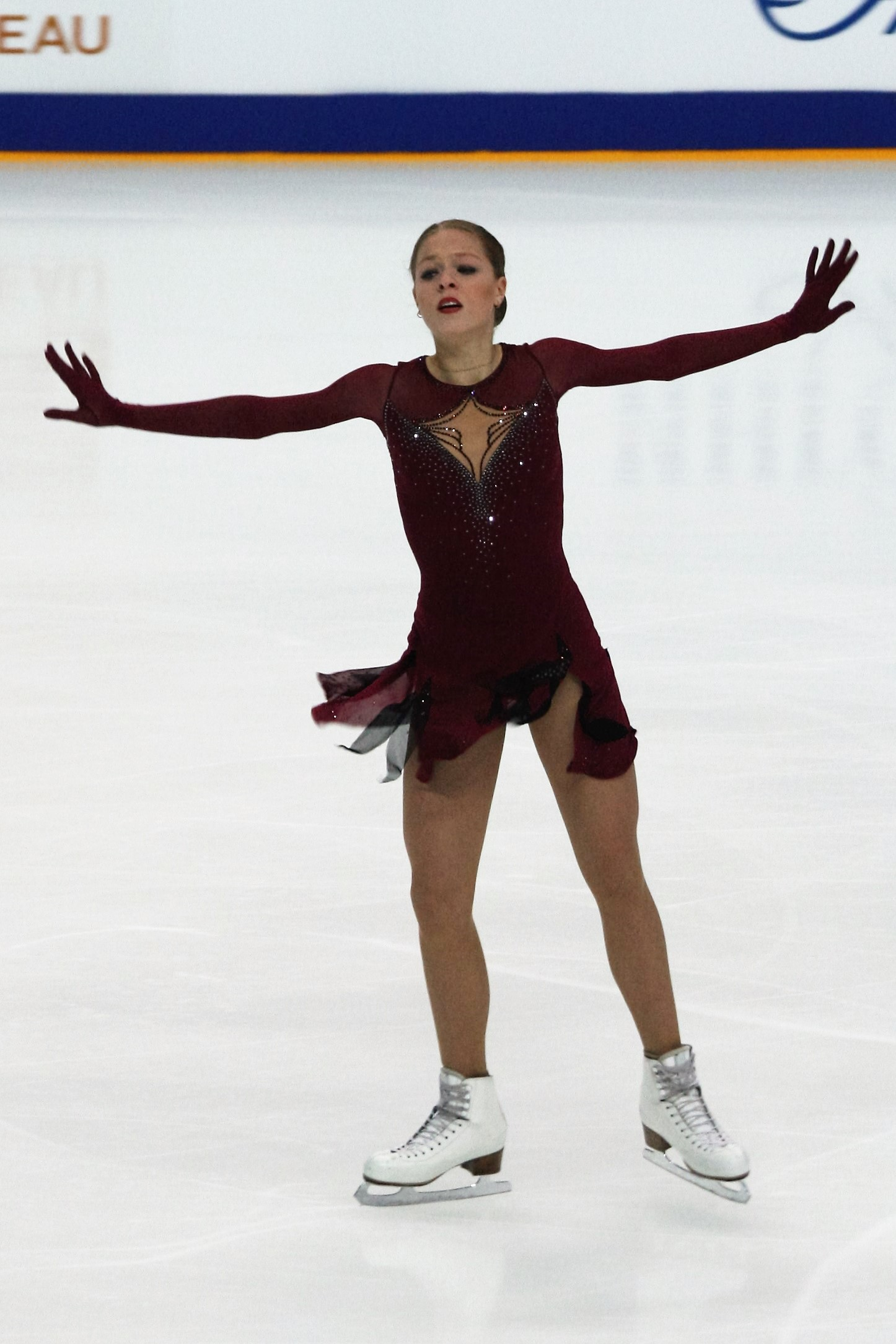
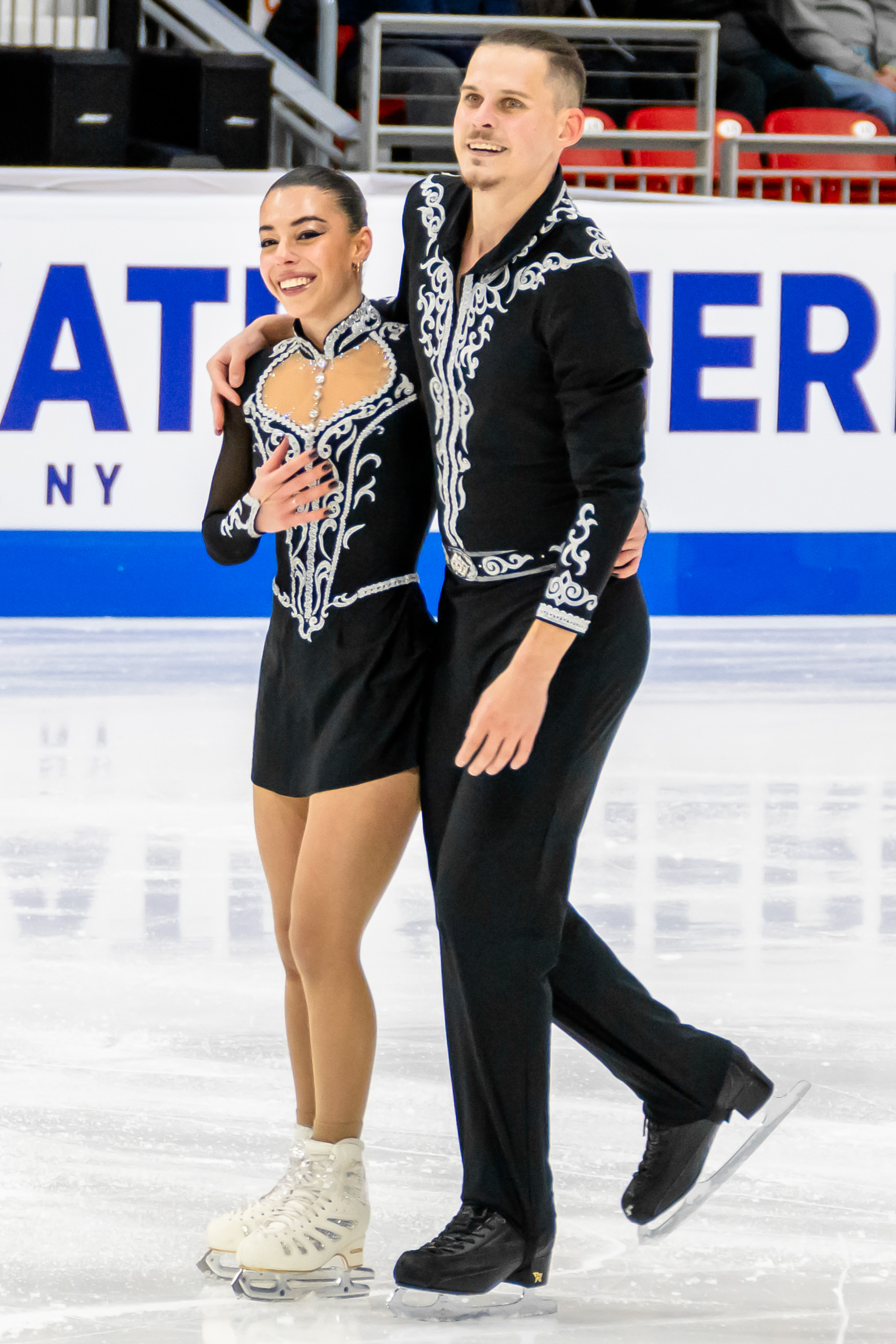
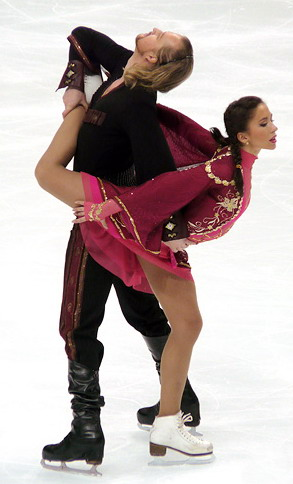
From left to right: Slavik Hayrapetyan, seven-time Armenian champion in men's singles; Anastasiya Galustyan, four-time Armenian champion in women's singles; Karina Akopova and Nikita Rakhmanin, 2026 Armenian champions in pair skating; and Anastasia Grebenkina and Vazgen Azrojan, three-time Armenian champions in ice dance

=== Men's singles ===
Men's event medalists
Year	Location	Gold	Silver	Bronze	Ref.
2003	Yerevan	Aramais Grigorian	Gegham Vardanyan	Vahe Ghazaryan	
2004	Yerevan	Aramais Grigorian	Gegham Vardanyan	Vahe Ghazaryan	
2005	Yerevan	Gegham Vardanyan	Hovhannes Mkrtchyan	Sarkis Hayrapetyan	
2006	Yerevan				
2007	Yerevan				
2008	Yerevan				
2009	Yerevan				
2010	Yerevan				
2011	Yerevan	Slavik Hayrapetyan	Sarkis Hayrapetyan	Denis Nerobeev	
2012	Yerevan				
2013	Yerevan				
2014	Yerevan				
2015	Yerevan	Slavik Hayrapetyan	Sarkis Hayrapetyan	Davit Grigoryan	
2016	Yerevan	Slavik Hayrapetyan	No other competitors		
2017	Yerevan	Slavik Hayrapetyan	Konstantin Milyukov	Alex Israelyan	
2018	Yerevan	Slavik Hayrapetyan	No other competitors		
2019	Yerevan	Slavik Hayrapetyan	No other competitors		
2020	Yerevan				
2021	Yerevan	Slavik Hayrapetyan	No other competitors		
2022	Yerevan				
2023	Yerevan				
2024	Yerevan	Fedor Chitipakhovian	No other competitors		
2025	Yerevan	Semen Daniliants	No other competitors		
2026	Yerevan	Semen Daniliants	No other competitors		

=== Women's singles ===
Women's event medalists
Year	Location	Gold	Silver	Bronze	Ref.
2003	Yerevan	Margarita Sahakyan	Irina Frangulyan	Ani Vardanyan	
2004	Yerevan	Margarita Sahakyan	Irina Frangulyan	Ani Vardanyan	
2005	Yerevan	Armine Stambultsyan	Ani Vardanyan	Margarita Sahakyan	
2006	Yerevan				
2007	Yerevan				
2008	Yerevan				
2009	Yerevan				
2010	Yerevan				
2011	Yerevan	Marta Grigoryan	Armine Mktchyan	Rima Enogyan	
2012	Yerevan				
2013	Yerevan				
2014	Yerevan				
2015	Yerevan	Anastasiya Galustyan	Rima Enogyan	Arshaluys Avetisyan	
2016	Yerevan	Anastasiya Galustyan	No other competitors		
2017	Yerevan	Anastasiya Galustyan	Elen Hakobyan	Zaruhi Tashchyan	
2018	Yerevan	Anastasiya Galustyan	No other competitors		
2019	Yerevan	No women's competitors			
2020	Yerevan				
2021	Yerevan	Valeriia Sidorova	No other competitors		
2022	Yerevan				
2023	Yerevan				
2024	Yerevan	Ellen Ghazaryan	No other competitors		
2025	Yerevan	Rubina Simonyan	Anna Smbatyan	No other competitors	
2026	Yerevan	No women's competitors			

=== Pairs ===
Pairs event medalists
Year	Location	Gold	Silver	Bronze	Ref.
2003	Yerevan	Maria Krasiltseva; Artem Znachkov	Gohar Aslanyan; Vardan Sahatchyan	No other competitors	
2004	Yerevan	Maria Krasiltseva; Artem Znachkov	Gohar Aslanyan; Vardan Sahatchyan	No other competitors	
2005	Yerevan	Lana Yesayan; Vardan Sahatchyan	Hripsime Balyan; Levon Khachatryan	No other competitors	
2006	Yerevan				
2007	Yerevan				
2008	Yerevan				
2009	Yerevan				
2010	Yerevan				
2011	Yerevan	No pairs competitors			
2012	Yerevan				
2013	Yerevan				
2014	Yerevan				
2015–19	Yerevan	No pairs competitors			
2020	Yerevan				
2021	Yerevan	No pairs competitors			
2022	Yerevan				
2023	Yerevan				
2024	Yerevan	No pairs competitors			
2025	Yerevan	No pairs competitors			
2026	Yerevan	Karina Akopova; Nikita Rakhmanin	No other competitors		

=== Ice dance ===
Ice dance event medalists
Year	Location	Gold	Silver	Bronze	Ref.
2003	Yerevan	Anastasia Grebenkina; Vazgen Azrojan	Marine Ghahramanyan; Gegham Avetisyan	No other competitors	
2004	Yerevan	Anastasia Grebenkina; Vazgen Azrojan	Marine Ghahramanyan; Gegham Avetisyan	Lusine Harutyunyan; Arshak Petrosyan	
2005	Yerevan	Anastasia Grebenkina; Vazgen Azrojan	Evelin Baghalyan; Dmitri Stakun	Lian Ghazaryan; Davit Avetisyan	
2006	Yerevan				
2007	Yerevan				
2008	Yerevan				
2009	Yerevan				
2010	Yerevan				
2011	Yerevan	No ice dance competitors			
2012	Yerevan				
2013	Yerevan				
2014	Yerevan				
2015	Yerevan	Tina Garabedian; Simon Proulx-Sénécal	Anna Galstyan; Narek Barsegyan	Tatevik Ghazaryan; Davit Harutyunyan	
2016	Yerevan	Tina Garabedian; Simon Proulx-Sénécal	No other competitors		
2017	Yerevan	Tina Garabedian; Simon Proulx-Sénécal	No other competitors		
2018–19	Yerevan	No ice dance competitors			
2020	Yerevan				
2021	Yerevan	Viktoriia Azroyan; Artur Gruzdev	No other competitors		
2022	Yerevan				
2023	Yerevan				
2024	Yerevan	No ice dance competitors			
2025	Yerevan	Kristina Dobroserdova; Alessandro Pellegrini	No other competitors		
2026	Yerevan	No ice dance competitors			

== Junior medalists ==
=== Men's singles ===
Junior men's event medalists
Year	Location	Gold	Silver	Bronze	Ref.
2019	Yerevan	No junior men's competitors			
2020	Yerevan				
2021	Yerevan	Semen Daniliants	No other competitors		
2022	Yerevan				
2023	Yerevan				
2024	Yerevan	Mikhail Salazaryan	Konstantin Smirnov	No other competitors	
2025	Yerevan	Mikhail Salazaryan	Konstantin Smirnov	Mark Hakobyan	
2026	Yerevan	Mikhail Salazaryan	No other competitors		

=== Women's singles ===
Junior women's event medalists
Year	Location	Gold	Silver	Bronze	Ref.
2019	Yerevan	Marina Asoyan	Izabela Davtyan	Monika Ghevondyan	
2020	Yerevan				
2021	Yerevan	No junior women's competitors			
2022	Yerevan				
2023	Yerevan				
2024	Yerevan	Sofi Karapetyan	Rubina Simonyan	Gohar Gevorgyan	
2025	Yerevan	Sofya Titova	Izabella Esaian	Mariia Arutunian	
2026	Yerevan	Mariia Arutunian	Izabella Esaian	Nadya Vardanyan	

=== Ice dance ===
Junior ice dance event medalists
Year	Location	Gold	Silver	Bronze	Ref.
2019	Yerevan	No junior ice dance competitors			
2020	Yerevan				
2021	Yerevan	Alisa Korneva; Edvard Ter-Gazarian	No other competitors		
2022	Yerevan				
2023	Yerevan				
2024	Yerevan	Kristina Dobroserdova; Alessandro Pellegrini	No other competitors		
2025	Yerevan	No junior ice dance competitors			
2026	Yerevan	No junior ice dance competitors			
