= Tomislav Bišćan =

Croatian figure skater (born 1987)

Personal information
- Born: 9 June 1987 (age 39)
- Height: 1.73 m (5 ft 8 in)

Figure skating career
- Country: Croatia
- Coach: Nevenka Gjurka
- Skating club: KKK Medvescak

Tomislav Bišćan (born 9 June 1987 in Zagreb, Croatia) is a Croatian figure skater. He is the 2002–2003 Croatian national champion.
