= 1906 World Figure Skating Championships =

Annual figure skating competition held in 1906

- Type: ISU Championship
- Season: 1906
- Location: Munich, German Empire (men); Davos, Switzerland (ladies)

Champions
- Men's singles: (German Empire) Gilbert Fuchs
- Ladies' singles: (United Kingdom) Madge Syers-Cave
- Previous: 1905 World Championships
- Next: 1907 World Championships

The World Figure Skating Championships is an annual figure skating competition sanctioned by the International Skating Union in which figure skaters compete for the title of World Champion.

The 1906 men's competition took place on February 4 in Munich, German Empire. Ulrich Salchow did not participate because he feared that the judgement would not be fair in Gilbert Fuchs' hometown Munich. The ladies' competition took place from January 28 to 29 in Davos, Switzerland. It was the first World Championships in figure skating for ladies.

== Results ==
=== Men ===
Rank	Name	Age	CF		FS		Total	Points	Places
1	(German Empire) Gilbert Fuchs	35	1	2917	1	770	3687	737.4	5
2	(German Empire) Heinrich Burger	24	4	2455	2	709	3164	632.8	14
3	(Sweden) Bror Meyer	20	2	2520	4	511	3031	606.2	17
4	(German Empire) Karl Zenger	32	5	2351	3	616	2967	593.4	20
5	(Sweden) Per Thorén	21	3	2462	6	490	2952	590.4	23
6	(Austrian Empire) Anton Steiner		6	2167	5	497	2664	532.8	27
7	(German Empire) Martin Gordan	29	7	1807	7	392	2199	439.8	34

Judges:

- (Austrian Empire) Ludwig Fänner
- (German Empire) C. Gützlaff
- (German Empire) O. Henning
- (German Empire) Robert Holletschek
- (German Empire) Otto Schöning

=== Ladies ===
Rank	Name	Places
1	(United Kingdom) Madge Syers-Cave	5
2	(Austrian Empire) Jenny Herz	13
3	(Kingdom of Hungary) Lily Kronberger	13.5
4	(German Empire) Elsa Rendschmidt	21.5
5	(United Kingdom) Dorothy Greenhough-Smith	22

Judges:

- (Switzerland) P. Birum
- (United Kingdom) E. Collingwood
- (Kingdom of Hungary) Tibor Földváry
- (Switzerland) M. Holtz
- (German Empire) H. Winzer
