= 1907 World Figure Skating Championships =

Annual figure skating competition held in 1907

- Type: ISU Championship
- Date: January 21 – 22
- Season: 1907
- Location: (Austrian Empire) Vienna, Austria-Hungary

Champions
- Men's singles: (Sweden) Ulrich Salchow
- Ladies' singles: (United Kingdom) Madge Syers-Cave
- Previous: 1906 World Championships
- Next: 1908 World Championships

The World Figure Skating Championships is an annual event sanctioned by the International Skating Union in which figure skaters compete for the title of World Champion. The 1907 competition took place on January 21–22 in Vienna, Austria-Hungary.

== Medal table ==
* Host nation (Austria)

Rank	Nation	Gold	Silver	Bronze	Total
1	Great Britain	1	0	0	1
1	Sweden	1	0	0	1
3	Austria*	0	2	0	2
4	Germany	0	0	1	1
4	Hungary	0	0	1	1
Totals (5 entries)		2	2	2	6

== Results ==
=== Men ===
Rank	Name	Places
1	(Sweden) Ulrich Salchow	5
2	(Austrian Empire) Max Bohatsch	11
3	(German Empire) Gilbert Fuchs	12
4	(Sweden) Per Thorén	20
5	(German Empire) Heinrich Burger	24
6	(German Empire) Martin Gordan	32
7	(Norway) Martinus Lørdahl	33

Judges:

- (Austrian Empire) Eduard Engelmann
- (Kingdom of Hungary) Tibor Földváry
- (Switzerland) H. Günther
- (Russian Empire) Alexey Lebedev
- (German Empire) Ludwig Niedermeyer

=== Ladies ===
Rank	Name	Places
1	(United Kingdom) Madge Syers-Cave	5
2	(Austrian Empire) Jenny Herz	12
3	(Kingdom of Hungary) Lily Kronberger	13
4	(German Empire) Elsa Rendschmidt	22
5	(United Kingdom) Gwendolyn Lycett	23

Judges:

- (Austrian Empire) Eduard Engelmann
- (Austrian Empire) E. Gschöpf
- (United Kingdom) E. S. Hirst
- (Kingdom of Hungary) E. Markus
- (German Empire) Ludwig Niedermeyer

== Sources ==
- Result List provided by the ISU
