= 1901 World Figure Skating Championships =

Annual figure skating competition held in 1901

- Type: ISU Championship
- Date: February 10 – 11
- Season: 1901
- Location: Stockholm, Sweden-Norway

Champions
- Men's singles: (Sweden) Ulrich Salchow
- Previous: 1900 World Championships
- Next: 1902 World Championships

The World Figure Skating Championships is an annual figure skating competition sanctioned by the International Skating Union in which figure skaters compete for the title of World Champion.

The competition took place from February 10 to 11 in Stockholm, Sweden. Originally allotted to London the competition was transferred to Stockholm due to the death of Queen Victoria. There were only two contestants. Four out of six judges came from Sweden. None of the judges came from the German Empire. Still the placings were the same. Adams, Pettersson, and Westergren put Salchow in first position, the other three judges Fuchs.

== Results ==
=== Singles ===
Rank	Name	CF	FS	Total	Points	Places
1	(Sweden) Ulrich Salchow	1	2	1423	237.17	9
2	(German Empire) Gilbert Fuchs	2	1	1409	234.83	9
	(Russian Empire) G. Hoppe	3				21
	(Russian Empire) A. Panshin	3				21

Judges:

- (United Kingdom) W. F. Adams
- (Austrian Empire) G. Euler
- (Sweden) A. Hansson
- (Sweden) L. Lindquist
- (Sweden) H. Pettersson
- (Sweden) Ivar Westergren

=== Pairs (unofficial) ===
The 1901 championship was the first since 1896 to include doubles competitions in addition to singles, but the title of "world champion" and medals were not awarded.

Rank	Name	Points	Places
1	(Austrian Empire) Christina von Szabo / Carl Euler	10	7
2	(United Kingdom) Madge Syers / Edgar Syers	8.3/7	14
3	(German Empire) Hedwig Muller / Martin Gordan	7.4/7	21
4	(Sweden) Emmy Sjöberg / Christian Soldan	6.5/7	28
