= Figure skating at the 1908 Summer Olympics – Ladies' singles =

Figure skating at the Olympics

Ladies' singles figure skating at the Games of the IV Olympiad
- Dates: 28–29 October 1908
- Competitors: 5 from 3 nations

Medalists
1st place, gold medalist(s)		Madge Syers; Great Britain
2nd place, silver medalist(s)		Elsa Rendschmidt; Germany
3rd place, bronze medalist(s)		Dorothy Greenhough-Smith; Great Britain

The ladies' singles was one of four events in figure skating at the 1908 Summer Olympics. Each nation could enter up to 3 skaters. Without rivals Jenny Herz and Lily Kronberger present at the Olympics, Great Britain's Madge Syers easily won the gold medal.

== Competition format ==
Each skater had to complete a set of compulsory figures, with a possible score from those figures of 168. There were 5 figures which had to completed in both directions and 1 figure that was completed in only one direction (resulting in a total of 11 figures). Each figure was repeated three times. Marks were given for each figure from 0 to 6 (in half-point increments), then multiplied by a difficulty factor for that figure.

Each skater also performed a free skate of four minutes, with a score of up to 108. Scores from 0 to 6 were given for each of (a) content (difficulty and variety) and (b) performance. The total was multiplied by 9.

The maximum total possible score was therefore 276. Each judge would then arrange the skaters in order of total score by that judge; these ordinal rankings were used to provide final placement for the skaters, using a "majority rule"—if a majority of the judges ranked a pair first, the pair won. If there was no majority, the total ordinals controlled. Ties were broken by total points.

== Results ==
The judges were unanimous in ranking Syers first, awarding her the gold medal. Rendschmidt earned second-place marks from a majority of the judges (4 of the 5) to take silver. Greenhough-Smith had a majority of the third-place marks (3 of 5), along with a second-place result, to earn the bronze. Montgomery took fourth place with 4 of the 5 judges giving her that rank. Lycett finished last; though one judge ranked her third, the remaining 4 placed her in fifth.

Rank	Skaters	Nation	Points (Rank)					Average score	CF	FS	Total ordinals
Rank	Skaters	Nation	(United Kingdom) HF	(Sweden) EH	(Switzerland) GH	(Russian Empire) GS	(Germany) HW	Average score	CF	FS	Total ordinals
1st place, gold medalist(s)	Madge Syers	Great Britain	225.5 (1)	236 (1)	266.5 (1)	262 (1)	242.5 (1)	252.5	1	1	5
2nd place, silver medalist(s)	Elsa Rendschmidt	Germany	201.5 (3)	211 (2)	211 (2)	211.5 (2)	220 (2)	211.0	2	2	11
3rd place, bronze medalist(s)	Dorothy Greenhough-Smith	Great Britain	210 (2)	206.5 (3)	182 (4)	180.5 (3)	181.5 (3)	192.1	3	3	15
4	Elna Montgomery	Sweden	167.5 (4)	166.5 (4)	174.5 (5)	170 (4)	173 (4)	170.3	4	5	21
5	Gwendoline Lycett	Great Britain	164 (5)	152 (5)	187.5 (3)	160 (5)	156.5 (5)	164.0	5	4	23

Referee:

- (United Kingdom) Herbert G. Fowler

Judges:

- (United Kingdom) Harry D. Faith
- (Sweden) Edvard Hörle
- (Switzerland) Gustav Hügel
- (Russian Empire) Georg Sanders
- (Germany) Hermann Wendt

== Sources ==
- Cook, Theodore Andrea (1908). The Fourth Olympiad, Being the Official Report. London: British Olympic Association.
- De Wael, Herman. Herman's Full Olympians: "Figure skating 1908". Accessed 2 May 2006. Available electronically at.
