= Dorothy Greenhough-Smith =

British figure skater (1882–1965)

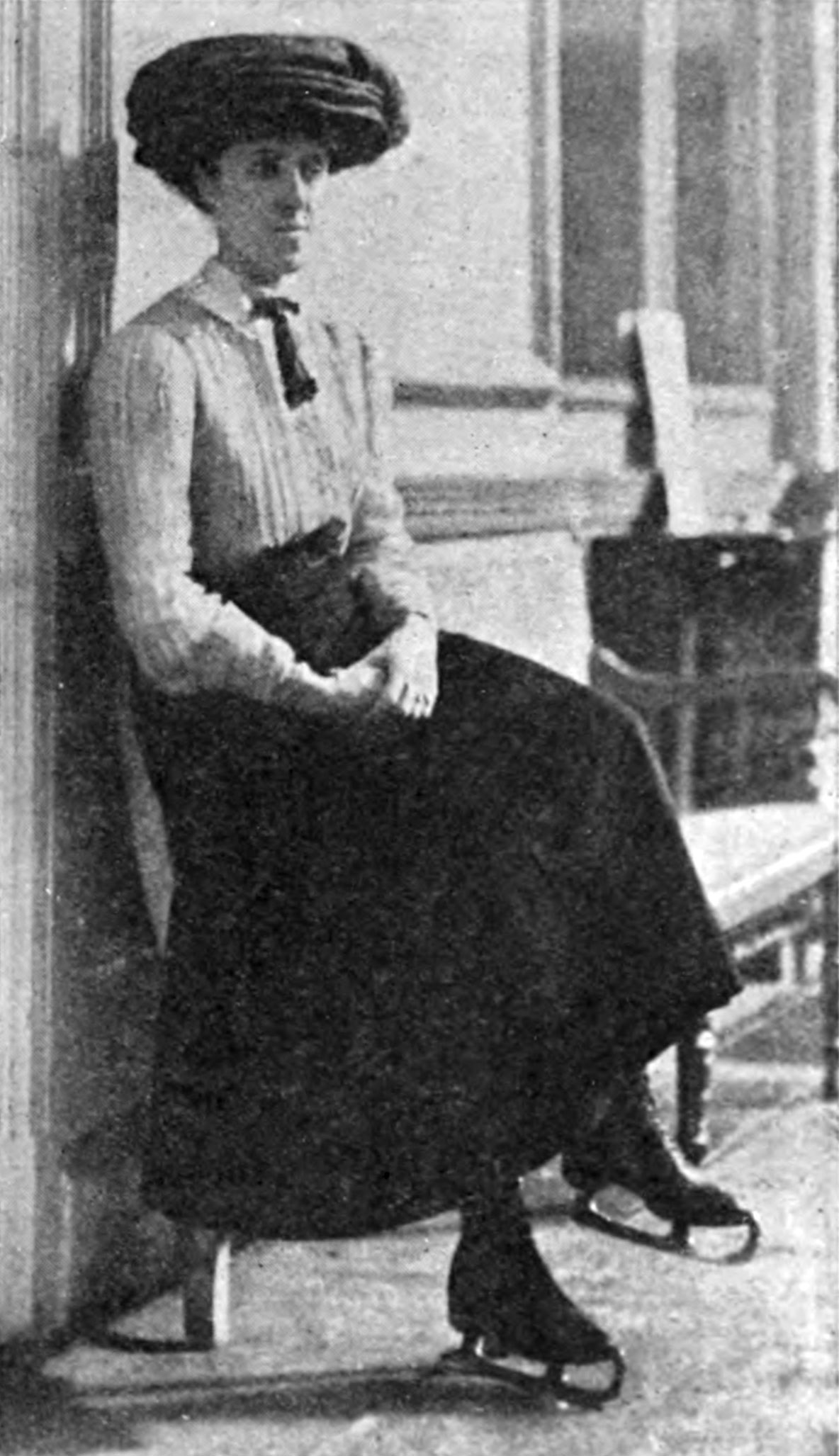

Personal information
- Born: 27 September 1882 Yarm, Stockton-on-Tees, England
- Died: 9 May 1965 (aged 82)

Figure skating career
- Country: United Kingdom
Medal record
Representing United Kingdom
Ladies' Figure skating
Olympic Games
Bronze medal – third place	1908 London	Ladies' singles
World Championships
Silver medal – second place	1912 Davos	Ladies' singles

Olympic medal record

Ladies Figure skating
Bronze medal – third place	1908 London	Ladies' singles

Dorothy Greenhough-Smith (27 September 1882 – 9 May 1965) was a British figure skater. She won the bronze medal in women's singles at the 1908 Summer Olympics and was the 1912 World silver medalist, as well as a two-time (1908, 1911) British champion.

== Early life ==
Greenhough-Smith was the daughter of writer James Edward Preston Muddock.

== Career ==
Greenhough-Smith, like her rival Madge Syers, competed in mixed-sex events and sometimes defeated men. She was the British champion in 1908 and 1911; at the time, the event was not divided by gender.

In 1906, she competed in the first women's event at the 1906 World Championships, where she placed fifth out of the five competitors.

She won the bronze medal at the 1908 Summer Olympics, the first Olympics where figure skating was contested. She came in second in the free skating section of the competition, and The Field noted that she did an Axel jump. According to T. D. Richardson, she was the first women to perform this jump, and she did so in an ankle-length skirt. The Westminster Gazette praised the power and accuracy of her movements.

Greenhough-Smith was the 1912 World silver medalist, which was the first silver medal in women's skating for Great Britain. (Madge Syers previously won a silver medal at the 1902 World Championships, where it was assumed all entrants would be men.)

Away from the ice, she also played swam and played tennis; she entered the 1914 Wimbledon Championships, losing in the first round.

== Personal life ==
Greenhough-Smith married publisher and editor Herbert Greenhough Smith in 1900, when she was 17. After she finished competing, she had a son who died in infancy. She died 9 May 1965.

== Competitive highlights ==
Event	1906	1908	1911	1912
Summer Olympic Games		3rd		
World Championships	5th			2nd
British Championships		1st	1st	
