= 1907 European Figure Skating Championships =

Figure skating competition

- Type: ISU Championship
- Date: January 26 – 27
- Season: 1907
- Location: Berlin, German Empire

Champions
- Men's singles: (Sweden) Ulrich Salchow
- Previous: 1906 European Championships
- Next: 1908 European Championships

The 1907 European Figure Skating Championships were held on January 26 and 27 in Berlin, German Empire. Elite figure skaters competed for the title of European Champion in the category of men's singles.

== Results ==
Rank	Name	Places
1	(Sweden) Ulrich Salchow	6
2	(German Empire) Gilbert Fuchs	10
3	(Austrian Empire) Ernst Herz	14
4	(Sweden) Per Thorén	20
5	(Norway) Martinus Lørdahl	25
6	(German Empire) Martin Gordan	30

Judges:

- (German Empire) I. Fossling
- (German Empire) Georg Helfrich
- (German Empire) O. Henning
- (Austrian Empire) A. Prokesch
- (German Empire) Otto Schöning

== Sources ==
- Result List provided by the ISU
