= Pyotr Orlov =

Soviet figure skater and pair skating coach

Personal information
- Full name: Pyotr Petrovich Orlov
- Born: 11 July 1912 Kurganovo, Tver Governorate, Russian Empire
- Died: 1989

Figure skating career
- Country: Russia → Soviet Union
- Coach: Fyodor Datlin; Nikolai Panin; Ksenia Caesar
- Skating club: Dynamo, Leningrad

Pyotr Petrovich Orlov (Russian: Пётр Петро́вич Орло́в; 11 July 1912 – 1989) was a Soviet figure skater and pair skating coach. He was a three-time champion of the USSR (1946, 1947, 1951) and bronze medalist of the USSR championship (1938) in pair skating and Master of Sports of the USSR in (1938) and Honored Coach of the USSR (1958).

== Biography ==
Pyotr was born on 11 July 1912 in the village of Kurganovo, Tver Governorate. He was involved in figure skating as part of the Dynamo Sports Club in Leningrad. In 1938 he graduated from the Lesgaft National State University of Physical Education, Sport and Health.

Figure skating classes continued until 1946. After World War II, Orlov was awarded the Order of the Patriotic War second class (1985). In the post-war years, he sought out Leningrad skaters, and resumed the work of the figure skating section.

He was judge of the Republican category of the RSFSR figure skating (1958). In 1960 he moved from Leningrad to Kiev to work as a coach of the Ukrainian artistic and sports ensemble.

Among his famous wards are Igor Moskvin, Maya Belenkaya, Lyudmila Belousova, Oleg Protopopov, Nina Zhuk, Stanislav Zhuk, and Nina Mozer.

He died in 1989. He is buried in Kiev.
