= 1911 European Figure Skating Championships =

Figure skating competition

- Type: ISU Championship
- Date: February 12
- Season: 1911
- Location: Saint Petersburg, Russian Empire

Champions
- Men's singles: (Sweden) Per Thorén
- Previous: 1910 European Championships
- Next: 1912 European Championships

The 1911 European Figure Skating Championships were held on February 12 in Saint Petersburg, Russian Empire. Elite figure skaters competed for the title of European Champion in the category of men's singles.

== Results ==
Rank	Name	CF	FS	Points	Places
1	(Sweden) Per Thorén	2	1	2058.7	15
2	(Russian Empire) Karl Ollo	1	3	2026.5	17
3	(German Empire) Werner Rittberger	5	2	1990.5	21
4	(Russian Empire) Ivan Malinin	3	4	1940.0	25.5
5	(Kingdom of Hungary) Andor Szende	4	5	1897.5	26.5

- Referee: (Russian Empire) Vyacheslav Sreznevsky

Judges:

- (German Empire) P. Büttner
- (Kingdom of Hungary) Artúr Dezső
- (Russian Empire) Aleksandr Ivashentsov
- (Russian Empire) Alexey Lebedev
- (Russian Empire) Georg Sanders
- (Russian Empire) Rudolf Sundgren
- (Russian Empire) Sergey Shustov
