= 1905 World Figure Skating Championships =

Annual figure skating competition held in 1905

- Type: ISU Championship
- Date: February 5 – 6
- Season: 1905
- Location: Stockholm, Sweden-Norway

Champions
- Men's singles: (Sweden) Ulrich Salchow
- Previous: 1904 World Championships
- Next: 1906 World Championships

The World Figure Skating Championships is an annual event sanctioned by the International Skating Union in which figure skaters compete for the title of World Champion. The competition took place on February 5–6 in Stockholm, Sweden. These were the last figure skating world championships with only the men's category.

== Results ==
Rank	Name	Places
1	(Sweden) Ulrich Salchow	8
2	(Austrian Empire) Max Bohatsch	14
3	(Sweden) Per Thorén	21
4	(Sweden) Richard Johansson	28
5	(German Empire) Martin Gordan	34

Judges:

- (Sweden) E. Hörle
- (Kingdom of Hungary) E. Markus
- (Sweden) O. Petterson
- (German Empire) M. Rendschmidt
- (Russian Empire) Rudolf Sundgren
- (Sweden) Ivar Westergren
- (United Kingdom) Herbert Yglesias
