= Zenger (surname) =

Zenger may refer to:

- Zenger family
- Christoph Zenger (born 1940), a German mathematician
- Erich Zenger (1939–2010), a German Roman Catholic priest and theologian
- Felix Zenger (born 1986), Finnish beatboxer
- John Peter Zenger (1697–1746), a German-American printer, publisher, editor, and journalist
  - SS Peter Zenger, Liberty ship built in the United States during World War II, named after John Peter Zenger
- Josef Zenger (born 1935), German football player
- Joseph Zenger (1757–1827), German Catholic priest
- Karl Zenger (1873–1912), a German figure skater
- Karl Zenger (architect) (1838–1905), German architect
- Václav Karel Bedřich Zenger (1830–1908), Czech physicist and meteorologist
- Wilhelm Zenger (1877–1911), a German figure skater
