= Zengel =

Zengel is a surname. Notable people with the surname include:

- Len Zengel (1887–1963), American racecar driver
- Raphael Zengel (1894–1977), American-born Canadian World War I veteran
- Helena Zengel (born 2008), German actress

== See also ==
- Zenger (surname)
