= Nikolai Panin =

Russian figure skater

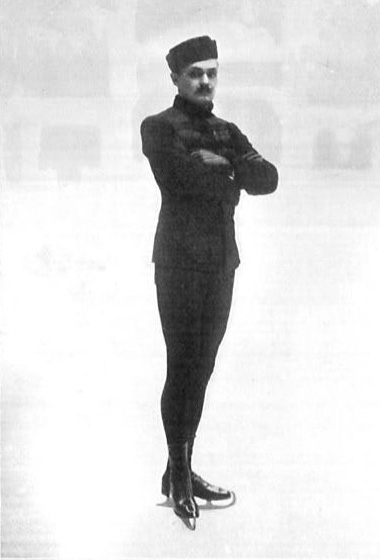
- Panin in 1908

Personal information
- Full name: Nikolai Aleksandrovich Panin-Kolomenkin
- Born: Nikolai Aleksandrovich Kolomenkin; 8 January 1872 Khrenovoye, Voronezh Governorate, Russian Empire
- Died: 19 January 1956 (aged 84) Leningrad, Russian SFSR, Soviet Union

Figure skating career
- Country: Russian Empire
Medal record
Men's figure skating
Representing Russian Empire
Olympic Games
Gold medal – first place	1908 London	Special figures
World Championships
Silver medal – second place	1903 St. Petersburg	Men's singles
European Championships
Silver medal – second place	1908 Warsaw	Men's singles
Bronze medal – third place	1904 Davos	Men's singles

Nikolai Aleksandrovich Panin-Kolomenkin (né Kolomenkin; Russian: Николай Александрович Панин-Коломенкин; 8 January 1872 [O.S. 27 December 1871] – 19 January 1956) was a Russian figure skater and coach. He won the gold medal in special figures in the 1908 Summer Olympics, and he became one of the oldest figure skating Olympic champions. Panin was Russia's first Olympic champion.

== Life and career ==
Nikolay Aleksandrovich Kolomenkin was born on 8 January 1872 in Khrenovoye, Voronezh Governorate, Russian Empire. He began figure skating as a child. His first pair of skates was split with his sister, as the family could not afford two pairs; he would use the left boot and his sister the right, and as an adult he would normally perform difficult figures with his left foot. He competed in figure skating under the name "Nikolay Panin", though most Russian sources now hyphenate his surname to "Panin-Kolomenkin".

Despite having a weak constitution, Panin was very active and took part in rowing, cycling, athletics and gymnastics. While studying mathematics at Saint Petersburg University in 1897, he took part in the first Russian Championships and placed second. To improve, he developed a technique of wrapping towels around his feet to weigh them down and improve his balance, thus preventing falls. He took the nickname "Panin" on to evade the mockery of his fellow students, at a time when many athletes were adopting nicknames.

Two men's skating events were contested at the 1908 Summer Olympics: single skating and special figures. Panin won the special figures event and competed, but did not finish, in the singles event. 1908 was the only year in which special figures was an Olympic event. Panin also competed in the 1903 World Championships, placing second behind Salchow.

Panin was a prominent figure skating coach both before and after his win at the Olympics; his students included European Championships silver medalists Ivan Malinin and Karl Ollo, as well as six-time national champion Ksenia Caesar. He even helped train his rivals during his own competitive career. He wrote several biographical and reference books, the first of which appeared in 1910, and he was also a judge at international competitions.

He also competed as a shooter. At the 1912 Summer Olympics in Stockholm, he placed 8th in the 50 metre pistol competition.

Panin was also one of the first to be ranked in a sport classification system, a precursor to the Unified Sports Classification System of the USSR. Several of his students also won ratings.

Panin died on 19 January 1956 (aged 83) in Leningrad, Russian SFSR, Soviet Union.

== Competitive highlights ==
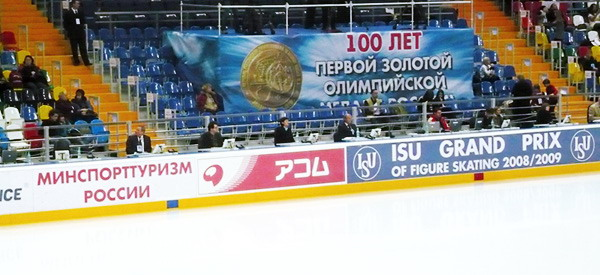
2008 Cup of Russia poster: "100 years since the first gold Olympic medal"

Illustration of special figures by Panin

=== Single skating ===
Event	1901	1902	1903	1904	1905	1906	1907	1908
Olympic Games								WD
World Championships			2nd					
European Championships				3rd				2nd
Russian Championships	1st	1st	1st	1st	1st		1st	
WD = Withdrew

=== Special figures ===
Event	1908
Olympic Games	1st

== Legacy ==
- From 1957 to 1987, the "Panin-Kolomenkin Memorial" tournament was held annually in Leningrad. The main prize was a large porcelain vase (about one meter tall) engraved with the names of all the winners of the competition. In 2007, the Saint Petersburg Figure Skating Federation revived the tournament. In 2008, the tournament became an international event.
- In 1993 Russia issued a 50 ruble gold coin commemorating Russia's first gold medal. Panin appears alongside the Olympic rings and flame, a laurel branch, and a winged ice skate.
- Panin was inducted into the World Figure Skating Hall of Fame in 2009.

== See also ==
- Image of more Panin special figures
- Russia at the 1908 Summer Olympics
