= 1902 World Figure Skating Championships =

Annual figure skating competition held in 1902

- Type: ISU Championship
- Date: February 13
- Season: 1902
- Location: London, United Kingdom

Champions
- Men's singles: (Sweden) Ulrich Salchow
- Previous: 1901 World Championships
- Next: 1903 World Championships

The World Figure Skating Championships is an annual figure skating competition sanctioned by the International Skating Union in which figure skaters compete for the title of World Champion.

The competition took place on 13 February in London, United Kingdom. It was the first World Championships held on artificial ice.

It was assumed that only men would compete in the event, and just four skaters participated. However, one of them was a woman, Madge Syers. After the competition, the winner, Ulrich Salchow, delighted with Syers, presented her with the gold medal he had just won. At the time, the International Skating Union rules did not specify that only men are allowed to participate. In the following year, rules were changed and separate championships for women and men were introduced. However, it was several years before the ladies' event first took place in 1906.

== Results ==
=== Singles ===
Rank	Name	Age	CF		FS		Total	Points	Places
1	(Sweden) Ulrich Salchow	24	1	1188	1	638	1826	365.2	5
2	(United Kingdom) Madge Syers	20	2	843	3	396	1239	247.8	13
3	(German Empire) Martin Gordan	25	4	768	2	440	1208	241.6	15
4	(United Kingdom) Horatio Torrome	41	3	809	4	374	1183	236.6	17

- Referee: (Sweden) Viktor Balck

Judges:

- (United Kingdom) W. F. Adams
- (United Kingdom) J. H. Thompson
- (German Empire) Hermann Wendt
- (Russian Empire) Piotr Weryho
- (Sweden) Ivar Westergren

=== Pairs (unofficial) ===
The 1902 championships were the first to hold a pairs competition alongside the singles. The title of "world champions" and medals were not awarded, since the only pair to enter were (United Kingdom) Madge Syers / Edgar Syers.
