= Residential house of Nikolai Panin =

- Жилой дом Николая Панина
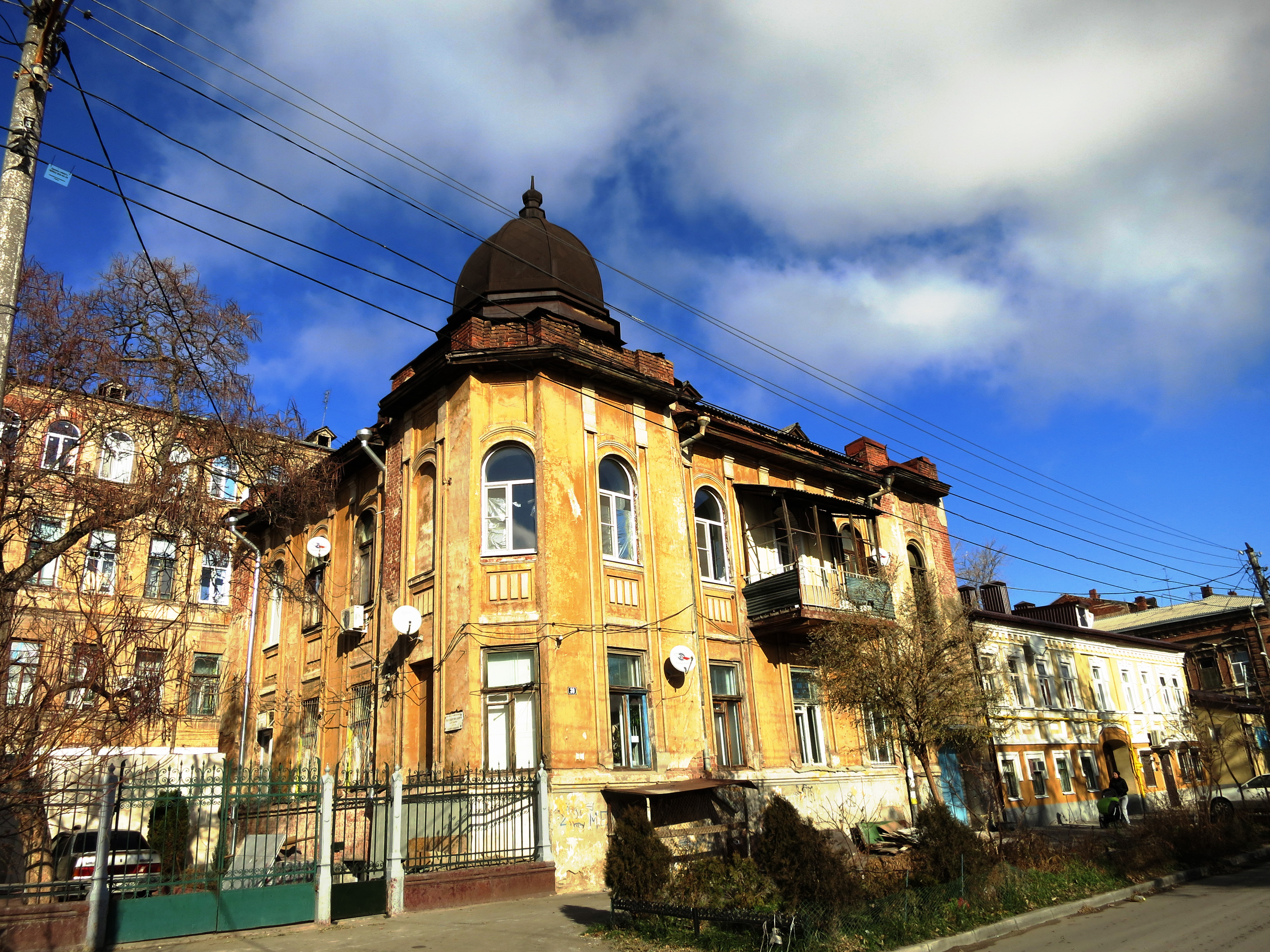
- Location: Rostov-on-Don, Ulyanovskaya Street, 39
- Coordinates: 47°13′00″N 39°43′03″E
- Completion date: 1910

The residential house of Nikolai Panin (Russian: Жилой дом Николая Панина) is a building in Rostov-on-Don which was built in 1910 in modernist style.

== History and description ==
The building was built on the project of the architect E. M. Gulin at the expense of the merchant N. A. Panin. Makes a uniform architectural complex with the Old Belief Pokrovsky Cathedral standing nearby. In Panin's house, the Old Belief almshouse was placed (according to other data – the house of the price). Nikolay Panin was a head of the community of Old Believers of Old Believers (the Russian drevlepravoslavny church now), and after the death, he bequeathed the house to the temple. In the 1920th years, the building was nationalized. The house of Nikolay Panin was taken № 411 of 9 October 1998, by the resolution of the Head of administration of the Rostov region under the state protection as an object of cultural heritage of regional value.

The house of Panin is located on Ulyanovskaya Street opposite to an apse of Old Belief Pokrovsky Cathedral. The two-storeyed building has a rectangular configuration in the plan. The ceremonial facade is accented by extreme raskrepovka with attics. The southeast corner of the building is topped with a dome with a spike. Architectural and art shape of construction form a plaster decor. The shovels which are placed on all height of the building carry out vertical partitioning of a facade. Windows of the first floor rectangular, and on the second – have the semi-circular end. Window openings are decorated by geometrical inserts. On the second floor subwindow niches of a rustovana, and a niche over windows have a profile of a difficult configuration. The main entrance with a swing door is in the right part of a facade.
