= 1910 European Figure Skating Championships =

Figure skating competition

- Type: ISU Championship
- Date: February 10 – 11
- Season: 1910
- Location: Berlin, German Empire

Champions
- Men's singles: (Sweden) Ulrich Salchow
- Previous: 1909 European Championships
- Next: 1911 European Championships

The 1910 European Figure Skating Championships were held from February 10 to 11 in Berlin, German Empire. Elite figure skaters competed for the title of European Champion in the category of men's singles.

== Results ==
Rank	Name	Places
1	(Sweden) Ulrich Salchow	7
2	(German Empire) Werner Rittberger	14
3	(Sweden) Per Thorén	22
4	(United Kingdom) Keiller Greig	27
5	(Norway) Martin Stixrud	35

Judges:

- (German Empire) Martin Gordan
- (German Empire) Fritz Hellmund
- (German Empire) P. Kersten
- (German Empire) E. Schirm
- (German Empire) A. Strasilla
- (German Empire) Hermann Wendt
- (German Empire) Franz Zilly

== Sources ==
- Result list provided by the ISU
