= Khrenovy =

Khrenovy (Russian: Хреновый; masculine), Khrenovaya (Хреновая; feminine), or Khrenovoye (Хреновое; neuter) is the name of several rural localities in Russia:

- Khrenovoye, Bobrovsky District, Voronezh Oblast, a selo in Khrenovskoye Rural Settlement of Bobrovsky District of Voronezh Oblast
- Khrenovoye, Novousmansky District, Voronezh Oblast, a selo in Khrenovskoye Rural Settlement of Novousmansky District of Voronezh Oblast
- Khrenovaya, a village in Yelninskoye Rural Settlement of Gagarinsky District of Smolensk Oblast
