= 1909 European Figure Skating Championships =

Figure skating competition

- Type: ISU Championship
- Date: January 23 – 24
- Season: 1909
- Location: (Kingdom of Hungary) Budapest, Austria-Hungary

Champions
- Men's singles: (Sweden) Ulrich Salchow
- Previous: 1908 European Championships
- Next: 1910 European Championships

The 1909 European Figure Skating Championships were held from January 23 to January 24 in Budapest, Hungary. Budapest was part of the Austo-Hungarian Empire at this time. Elite figure skaters competed for the title of European Champion in the category of men's singles.

== Results ==
Rank	Name	Places
1	(Sweden) Ulrich Salchow	9
2	(German Empire) Gilbert Fuchs	15
3	(Sweden) Per Thorén	18
4	(Russian Empire) Karl Ollo	31
5	(Kingdom of Hungary) Sándor Urbáry	32

Judges:

- (Austrian Empire) C. Fillunger
- (German Empire) Georg Helfrich
- (German Empire) Robert Holletschek
- (Sweden) Edward Hörle
- (Kingdom of Hungary) E. Markus
- (German Empire) L. Niedermayer
- (German Empire) Oskar Uhlig

== Sources ==
- Result List provided by the ISU
