= 1906 European Figure Skating Championships =

Figure skating competition

- Type: ISU Championship
- Date: January 28 – 29
- Season: 1906
- Location: Davos, Switzerland

Champions
- Men's singles: (Sweden) Ulrich Salchow
- Previous: 1905 European Championships
- Next: 1907 European Championships

The 1906 European Figure Skating Championships were held on January 28 and 29 in Davos, Switzerland. Elite figure skaters competed for the title of European Champion in the category of men's singles.

== Results ==
Rank	Name	Places
1	(Sweden) Ulrich Salchow	5
2	(Austrian Empire) Ernst Herz	13
3	(Sweden) Per Thorén	18
4	(Sweden) Bror Meyer	21
5	(Kingdom of Hungary) Sándor Urbáry	25
6	(German Empire) Max Rendschmidt	23

Judges:

- (Switzerland) P. Birum
- (Kingdom of Hungary) Tibor Földváry
- (Austrian Empire) Gustav Hügel
- (United Kingdom) Edgar Syers
- (German Empire) Hugo Winzer

== Sources ==
- Result List provided by the ISU
