= 1905 European Figure Skating Championships =

Figure skating competition

- Type: ISU Championship
- Date: January 22
- Season: 1905
- Location: Bonn, German Empire

Champions
- Men's singles: (Austrian Empire) Max Bohatsch
- Previous: 1904 European Championships
- Next: 1906 European Championships

The 1905 European Figure Skating Championships were held on January 22 in Bonn, German Empire. Elite figure skaters competed for the title of European Champion in the category of men's singles. The competitors performed only compulsory figures.

== Results ==
Rank	Name	Places
1	(Austrian Empire) Max Bohatsch	5
2	(German Empire) Heinrich Burger	10
3	(German Empire) Karl Zenger	15
4	(German Empire) Kurt Dannenberg	21
5	(German Empire) Martin Gordan	25
6	(United Kingdom) Douglas Adams	29

Judges:

- (Austrian Empire) Ludwig Fänner
- (German Empire) Gilbert Fuchs
- (German Empire) Fritz Hellmund
- (German Empire) Otto Schöning
- (German Empire) J. Schuhmacher

== Sources ==
- Result list provided by the ISU
