= 1912 European Figure Skating Championships =

Figure skating competition

- Type: ISU Championship
- Date: February 10 – 11
- Season: 1912
- Location: Stockholm, Sweden

Champions
- Men's singles: (Sweden) Gösta Sandahl
- Previous: 1911 European Championships
- Next: 1913 European Championships

The 1912 European Figure Skating Championships were held on February 10 to 11 in Stockholm, Sweden. Elite figure skaters competed for the title of European Champion in the category of men's singles.

== Results ==
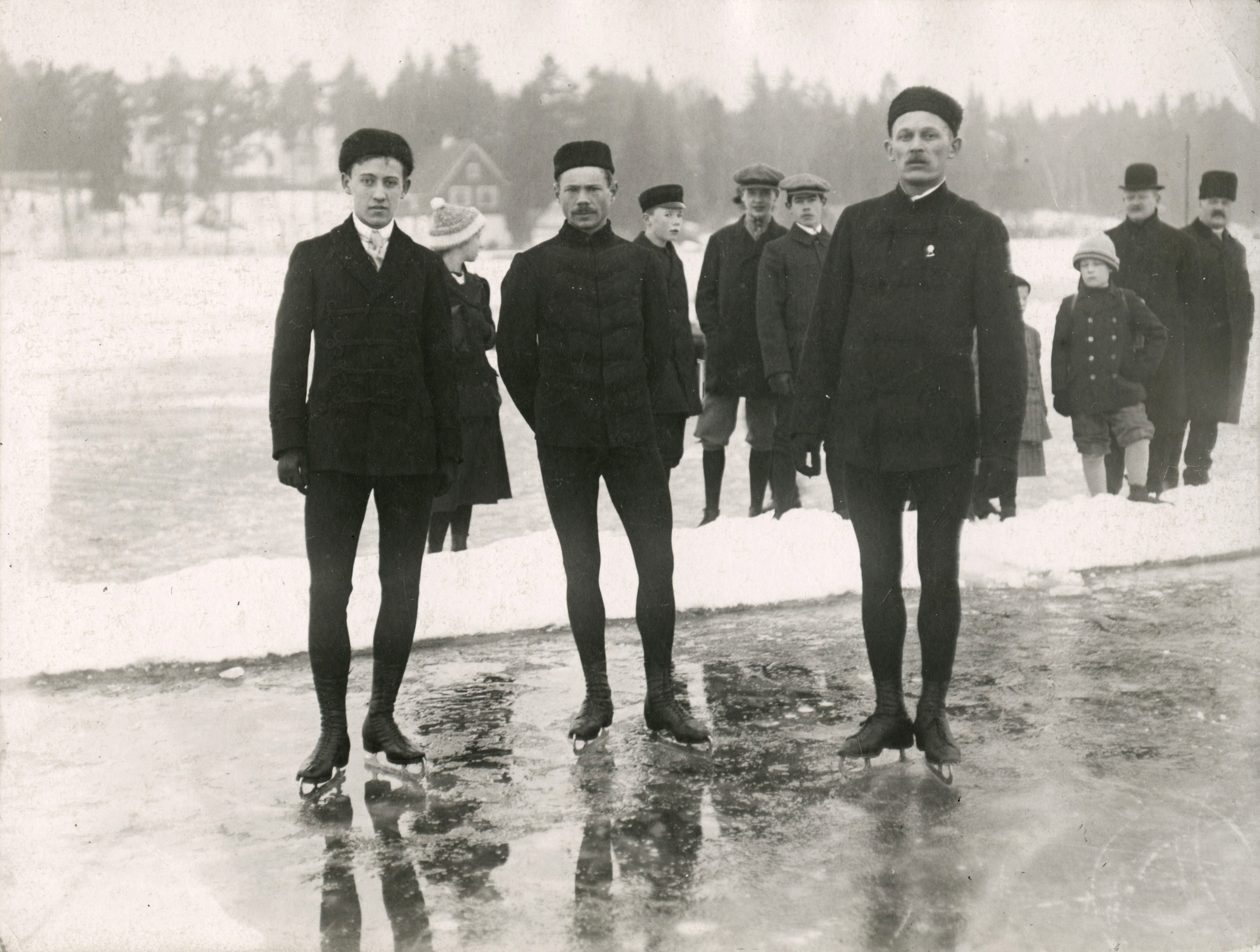
Sandahl, Malinin, and Stixrud at the competition

| Rank | Name | Places |
|---|---|---|
| 1 | (Sweden) Gösta Sandahl | 6 |
| 2 | (Russian Empire) Ivan Malinin | 9 |
| 3 | (Norway) Martin Stixrud | 15 |

Judges:

- (Sweden) August Anderberg
- (Austrian Empire) Josef Fellner
- (Sweden) Edward Hörle
- (Kingdom of Hungary) Jenő Minich
- (Russian Empire) Vyacheslav Sreznevsky
