= 1904 European Figure Skating Championships =

Figure skating competition

- Type: ISU Championship
- Date: January 16 – 17
- Season: 1904
- Location: Davos, Switzerland

Champions
- Men's singles: (Sweden) Ulrich Salchow
- Previous: 1901 European Championships
- Next: 1905 European Championships

The European Figure Skating Championships were held on January 16 and 17 in Davos, Switzerland. Elite figure skaters competed for the title of European Champion in the category of men's singles. The competitors performed only compulsory figures.

These were the first European Figure Skating Championships after two years. In 1902 and 1903, the Europeans were scheduled to be held in Amsterdam. In 1902, the championships were cancelled due to no ice. In 1903, the championships were cancelled in Amsterdam also due to no ice but were transferred to Stockholm. There the Europeans were cancelled because there was only one contestant.

== Results ==
Rank	Name	Places
1	(Sweden) Ulrich Salchow	8
2	(Austrian Empire) Max Bohatsch	13
3	(Russian Empire) Nikolai Panin	21
4	(German Empire) Martin Gordan	28

Judges:

- (Switzerland) P. Birum
- (Russian Empire) Robert Buhtger
- (German Empire) Kurt Dannenberg
- (Kingdom of Hungary) Tibor Földváry
- (United Kingdom) C. Hopkins
- (Austrian Empire) Gustav Hügel
- (United Kingdom) G. R. Wood
