= 1900 World Figure Skating Championships =

Annual figure skating competition held in 1900

- Type: ISU Championship
- Date: February 10 – 11
- Season: 1900
- Location: Davos, Switzerland

Champions
- Men's singles: (Austrian Empire) Gustav Hügel
- Previous: 1899 World Championships
- Next: 1901 World Championships

The 1899 World Figure Skating Championship were held February 10 and 11 in Davos, Switzerland.

Only three competitors entered, and one, from England, withdrew partway through the compulsory figures. The competition also included junior skating events and a combined-skating exhibition.

== Results ==
Rank	Name	Points	Places
1	(Austrian Empire) Gustav Hügel	338.2	7
2	(Sweden) Ulrich Salchow	339.8	8
