= 1908 European Figure Skating Championships =

Figure skating competition

- Type: ISU Championship
- Date: January 19
- Season: 1908
- Location: Warsaw, Russian Empire

Champions
- Men's singles: (Austrian Empire) Ernst Herz
- Previous: 1907 European Championships
- Next: 1909 European Championships

The 1908 European Figure Skating Championships were held on January 18 in Warsaw. Warsaw was part of the Russian Empire at this time. Elite figure skaters competed for the title of European Champion in the category of men's singles.

== Results ==
Rank	Name	Places
1	(Austrian Empire) Ernst Herz	5
2	(Russian Empire) Nikolai Panin	10
3	(Austrian Empire) Stefan Przedrzymirski	15

Judges:

- (Austrian Empire) K. Bevensee
- (Austrian Empire) Ludwig Fänner
- (Russian Empire) Z. Goebel
- (Austrian Empire) S. Uleniecki
- (Russian Empire) Piotr Weryho

== Sources ==
- Result list provided by the ISU
