= Max Bohatsch =

Austrian figure skater

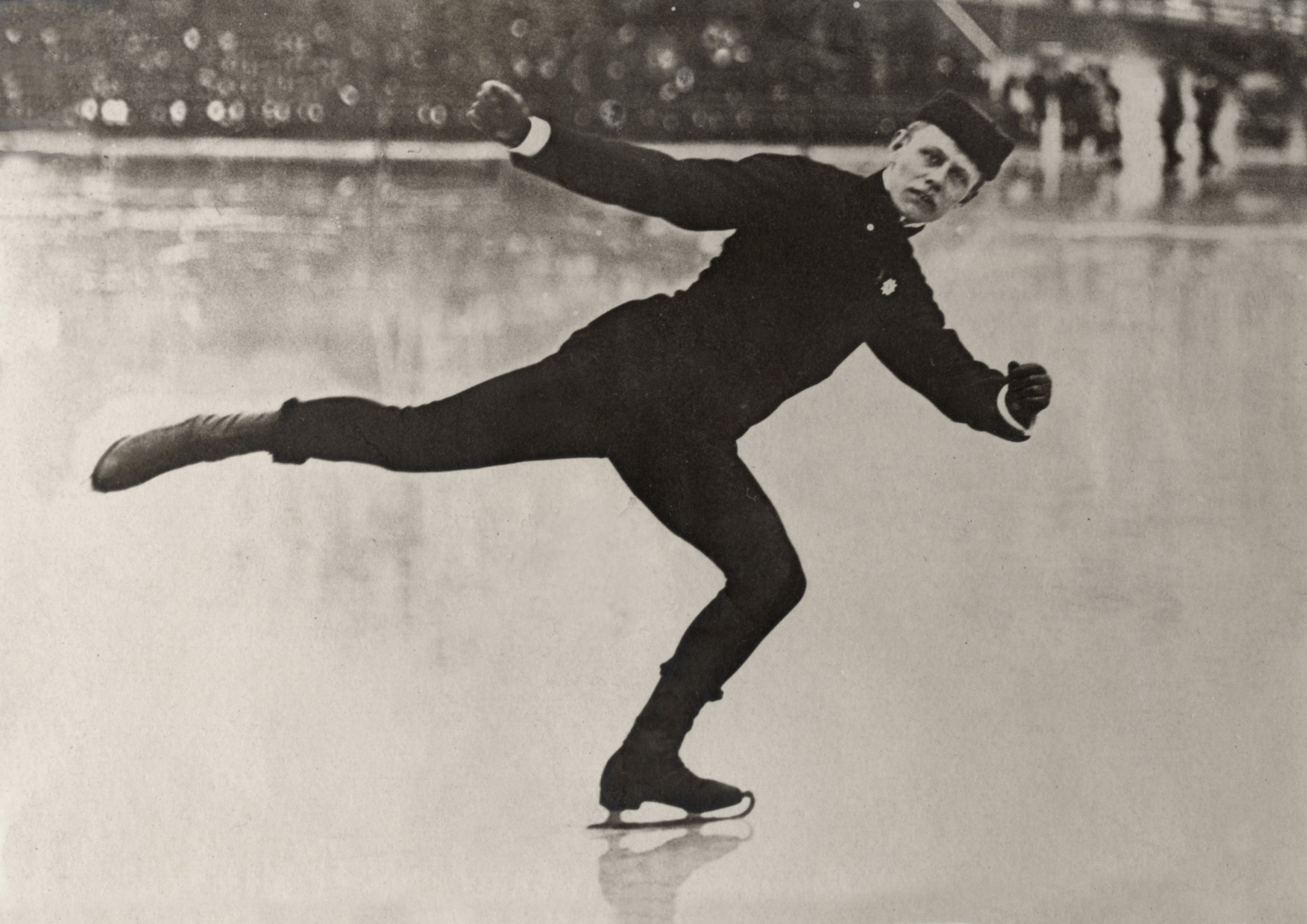

Figure skating career
- Country: Austria
Medal record
Representing Austria
Figure skating: Men's singles
World Championships
Silver medal – second place	1907 Vienna	Men's singles
Silver medal – second place	1905 Stockholm	Men's singles
Bronze medal – third place	1903 St. Petersburg	Men's singles
European Championships
Gold medal – first place	1905 Bonn	Men's singles
Silver medal – second place	1904 Davos	Men's singles

Max Bohatsch was an Austrian figure skater. He was the 1905 European champion and a three-time World medalist, winning silver in 1905 and 1907, and bronze in 1903. He won the Austrian Championships three times, in 1901, 1904, and 1905. He came in second place at the 1904 European Championships.

Figure skating historian James R. Hines reports that Irving Brokaw, in his 1910 book The Art of Skating (1910), describes "a slightly simplified version" of the ten-step ice dance, which Brokaw calls "the Bohastsch march".

== Results ==
International
Event	1901	1902	1903	1904	1905	1906	1907
World Championships			3rd		2nd		2nd
European Championships				2nd	1st		
National
Austrian Championships	1st			1st	1st		
