= 1904 World Figure Skating Championships =

Figure skating competition

- Type: ISU Championship
- Date: 23 – 24 February
- Season: 1904
- Location: Berlin, German Empire

Champions
- Men's singles: (Sweden) Ulrich Salchow
- Previous: 1903 World Championships
- Next: 1905 World Championships

The World Figure Skating Championships is an annual event sanctioned by the International Skating Union in which figure skaters compete for the title of World Champion. The competition took place from 23 to 24 February in Berlin, German Empire.

== Results ==
Rank	Name	Places
1	(Sweden) Ulrich Salchow	5
2	(German Empire) Heinrich Burger	12
3	(German Empire) Martin Gordan	13

Judges:

- (German Empire) K. Dorasil
- (German Empire) K. Ebhardt
- (German Empire) C. Gützlaff
- (German Empire) Kustermann
- (German Empire) M. Rendschmidt
