= Madge Syers =

British figure skater (1881–1917)

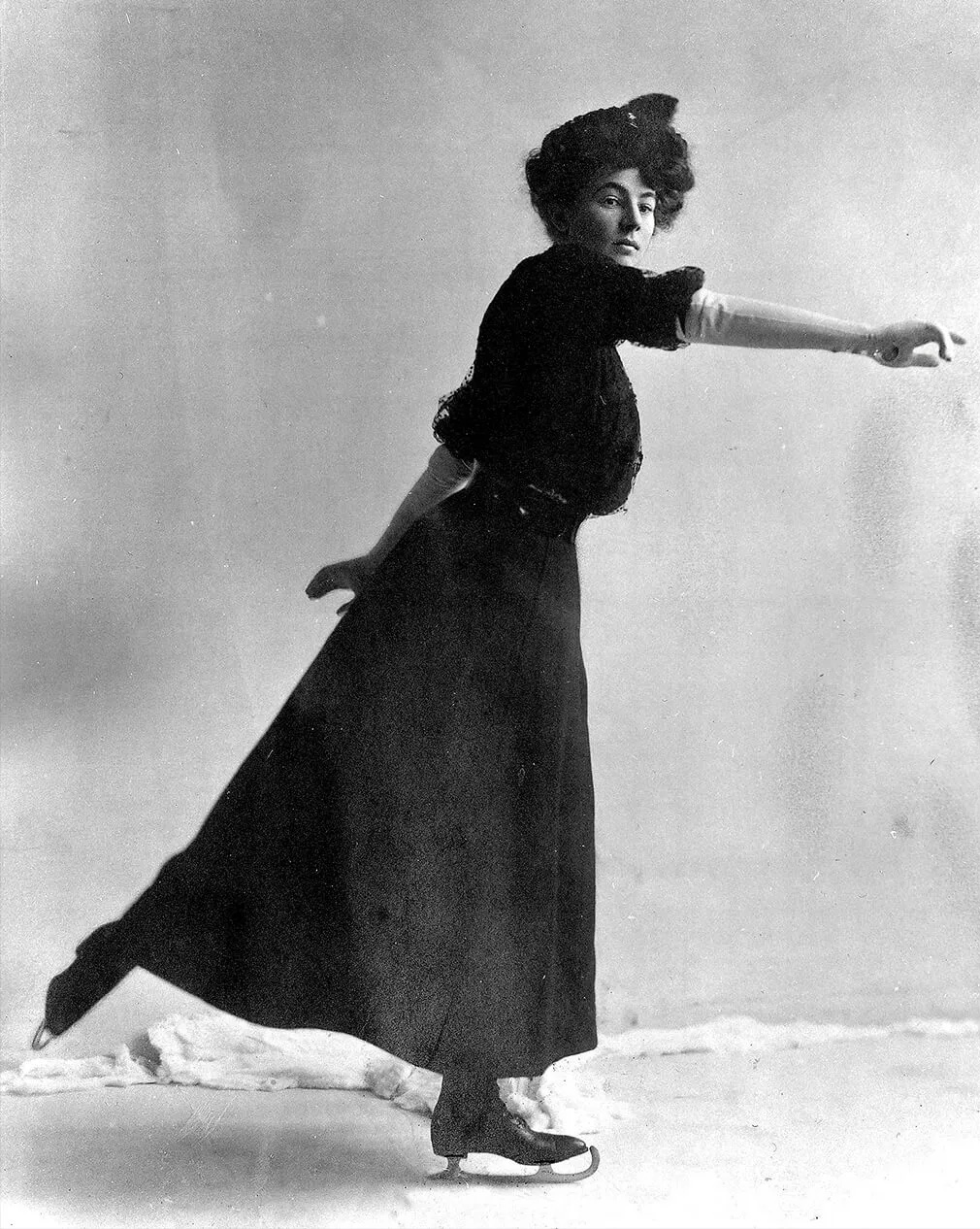
- Syers c. 1908

Personal information
- Born: Florence Madeline Cave; 16 September 1881 Kensington, London
- Died: 9 September 1917 (aged 35) Weybridge, Surrey

Figure skating career
- Country: United Kingdom
- Skating club: Prince's Skating Club
- Retired: 1908
Medal record
Representing United Kingdom
Ladies' Singles Figure skating
Olympic Games
Gold medal – first place	1908 London	Ladies' singles
World Championships
Gold medal – first place	1906 Davos	Ladies' singles
Gold medal – first place	1907 Vienna	Ladies' singles
Open Singles Figure skating
World Championships
Silver medal – second place	1902 London	Open singles
Pairs Figure skating
Olympic Games
Bronze medal – third place	1908 London	Pairs

Florence Madeline "Madge" Syers (née Cave, 16 September 1881 – 9 September 1917) was a British figure skater. She became the first woman to compete at the World Figure Skating Championships in 1902 by entering what was previously an all-male event and won the silver medal, which prompted the International Skating Union (ISU) to create a separate ladies' championship. Syers was the winner of the first two ladies' events in 1906 and 1907 and went on to become the Olympic champion at the 1908 Summer Olympics, the first Olympic Games to include figure skating. She also competed as a pairs skater with her husband Edgar Syers, winning the bronze medal at the 1908 Olympics.

== Personal life ==
Florence Madeline Cave was born on 16 September 1881 in Kensington, London, one of 15 children of Edward Jarvis Cave, a builder, and his wife Elizabeth Ann. Syers enjoyed many sports; she was a proficient figure skater, as well as a gifted swimmer and equestrienne. She won a competition in clay pigeon shooting in 1898, and she competed at the women's swimming championships held by the Bath Club in 1905 and 1906, winning several categories. Syers did not enjoy sports that required animals to suffer and was a member of the Society for the Protection of Birds. She became a regular at the Prince's Skating Club in Knightsbridge, which had been formed in 1896 and was popular with aristocratic society in London.

In 1899, Madge met her future husband Edgar Syers, a figure skater and coach who was 18 years her senior. Edgar was an exponent of the international skating style, which was freer and less rigid than the traditional English style, and encouraged Madge to adopt this style. Madge and Edgar competed together in pairs skating events, and in 1900 finished second in one of the first international pairs events, staged in Berlin. They married in June of that year. The Syers' co-authored The Book of Winter Sports in 1908.

== Career ==
=== 1902 World championships ===
The World Figure Skating Championships, first contested in 1896, was regarded as an all-male event since competitive skating was generally viewed as a male activity, but there was no regulation barring women, enabling Syers to enter and compete at the 1902 Championships in London. She won the silver medal behind Ulrich Salchow, who was reputedly so impressed with her challenge that he offered her his gold medal. T. D. Richardson later wrote: "Rumour, nay more than rumour – a good deal of expert opinion – thought she should have won."

Syers' entry into the World Championships prompted the ISU to discuss the subject of women competing against men at their next Congress in 1903. The concerns raised were that "(1) the dress prevents the judges from seeing the feet; (2) a judge might judge a girl to whom he was attached; and (3) it is difficult to compare women with men." To address the concerns of the ISU, Syers started the trend of wearing calf-length skirts so judges could see her foot work. The Congress voted six to three in favour of barring women from the championships.

=== 1903–1907 ===
Syers continued to compete elsewhere and, in 1903, won the inaugural British Figure Skating Championships, which began as a mixed competition. She won again the following year, beating her husband, who won the silver medal. She also entered the 1904 European Championships but withdrew due to injury after the first stage of the competition, the compulsory figures.

The 1905 ISU Congress established a separate ladies' event, which was supported by strong lobbying from the National Ice Skating Association. The event was known at the time as the Ladies' Championship of the ISU rather than a World Championship, (Note: The ISU gave the Ladies' event World Championship status in 1924.) and was staged at a different date and location from the men's event. Syers won the inaugural event held in Davos, Switzerland in 1906, finishing first in a field of five competitors. She won her second title in Vienna at the 1907 Championships.

=== 1908 Olympics ===
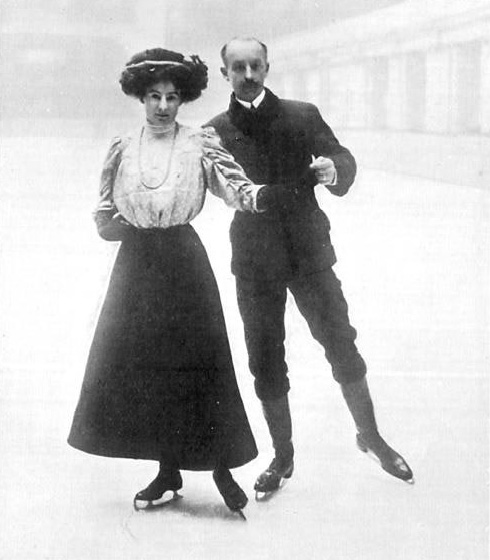
Madge and Edgar Syers at the 1908 Olympics

The 1908 Summer Olympics in London were the first Games to include figure skating events in the programme, which were staged in October at the Prince's Club. Syers entered both the ladies' event and the pairs with Edgar. In the ladies' event, Syers comfortably won the compulsory figures section, with all five judges placing her first. The official report of the Games described her as "in a class by herself" and stated that "the wonderful accuracy of her figures, combined with perfect carriage and movement, was the chief feature of the morning's skating." In the free skating, the report described her as having "excelled in rhythm and time-keeping, and her dance steps, pirouettes, &c., were skated without a fault." She was again placed first by all five judges and won the title. In the pairs event, Syers and Edgar finished third (of three couples) and won the bronze medal.

== Later life ==
Syers retired from competitive skating after the Olympics due to fading health. She and Edgar co-authored a second book together, The Art of Skating (International Style), published in 1913. She died of heart failure caused by acute endocarditis on 9 September 1917 at her home in Weybridge, Surrey, seven days shy of her 36th birthday.

Syers was elected to the World Figure Skating Hall of Fame in 1981.

== Results ==
Ladies' singles
Event	1906	1907	1908
Olympics			1st
World Championships	1st	1st	

Open singles
Event	1902	1903	1904
World Championships	2nd		
British Championships		1st	1st

Pairs
Event	1908
Olympics	3rd
