= 1903 World Figure Skating Championships =

Annual figure skating competition held in 1903

- Type: ISU Championship
- Date: February 20 – 21
- Season: 1903
- Location: Saint Petersburg, Russian Empire
- Venue: Yusupovsky Garden

Champions
- Men's singles: (Sweden) Ulrich Salchow
- Previous: 1902 World Championships
- Next: 1904 World Championships

The 1903 World Figure Skating Championship was 8th edition of World figure Skating Championship, an annual figure skating competition sanctioned by the International Skating Union in which figure skaters compete for the title of World Champion.

The competition took place from February 20 to 21 at the Yusupovsky Garden in Saint Petersburg, Russian Empire and was timed to 200-year Jubilee of Saint Petersburg.

== Results ==
=== Singles ===
Rank	Name	CF		FS		Total	Points	Places
1	(Sweden) Ulrich Salchow	1	1266	1	648	1914	382.8	6
2	(Russian Empire) Nikolai Panin	2	1157	3	600	1757	351.4	12
3	(Austrian Empire) Max Bohatsch	4	1079	2	636	1715	343.0	12
4	(German Empire) Ernst Lassahn	5	837	4	468	1305	261.0	20
WD	(German Empire) Gilbert Fuchs	3	1090				DNF	

- Referee: (Sweden) A. Hansson

Judges:

- (Kingdom of Hungary) Tibor Földváry
- (Russian Empire) Aleksandr Ivashentsov
- (Austrian Empire) Eduard von Löhr
- (Russian Empire) Georg Sanders
- (German Empire) Hermann Wendt

=== Pairs (unofficial) ===
Carried out of the competition for the third time won the pairs competition sporting a pairs:

Rank	Name	Points	Places
1	(Austrian Empire) Christina von Szabo / Carl Euler	56	7
2	(Austrian Empire) Mizzi Bohatsch / Otto Bohatsch	56	8
3	(German Empire) Frieda Bellinger / Gustav Stahlberg	44	16.5
4	(Russian Empire) K. V. Antoniewitsch / Andrei Hopp	41	18.5
5	(Russian Empire) M. Kaufmann / W. G. Wessmann	33	25
