= Ernst Herz =

Austrian figure skater

Figure skating career
- Country: Austria
Medal record
Representing Austria
Figure skating: Men's singles
World Championships
| Bronze medal – third place | 1909 Stockholm | Men's singles |
European Championships
| Gold medal – first place | 1908 Warsaw | Men's singles |
| Silver medal – second place | 1907 Berlin | Men's singles |
| Bronze medal – third place | 1906 Davos | Men's singles |

Ernst Herz was an Austrian figure skater. He was the 1908 European champion and 1909 World bronze medalist.

== Results ==
International
| Event | 1906 | 1907 | 1908 | 1909 |
|---|---|---|---|---|
| World Championships | | | | 3rd |
| European Championships | 2nd | 3rd | 1st | |
National
| Austrian Championships | | 1st | | |

== Sources ==
- World results
- European results
