= 1913 European Figure Skating Championships =

Figure skating competition

- Type: ISU Championship
- Date: February 1 – 2
- Season: 1913
- Location: Kristiania, Norway

Champions
- Men's singles: (Sweden) Ulrich Salchow
- Previous: 1912 European Championships
- Next: 1914 European Championships

The 1913 European Figure Skating Championships were held on February 1 to 2 in Kristiania, Norway. Elite figure skaters competed for the title of European Champion in the category of men's singles.

== Results ==
Rank	Name	Places
1	(Sweden) Ulrich Salchow	12
2	(Kingdom of Hungary) Andor Szende	14
3	(Austrian Empire) Willy Böckl	19
4	(Sweden) Harald Rooth	19
5	(Sweden) Richard Johansson	22
6	(Norway) Martin Stixrud	25
7	(Norway) Alexander Krogh	29

Judges:

- (Sweden) August Anderberg
- (Norway) Yngvar Bryn
- (Sweden) Edward Hörle
- (Kingdom of Hungary) Jenő Minich
- (Sweden) O. Sampe
