= 1899 World Figure Skating Championships =

Annual figure skating competition held in 1899

- Type: ISU Championship
- Date: February 12
- Season: 1899
- Location: Davos, Switzerland

Champions
- Men's singles: (Austrian Empire) Gustav Hügel
- Previous: 1898 World Championships
- Next: 1900 World Championships

The 1899 World Figure Skating Championship were held February 12 in Davos, Switzerland.

The competition was originally planned to be held in Vienna; however, the weather was too mild to hold the competition, and the location was changed to Davos, which had recently held the 1899 European Championships.

Five skaters entered, but only three appeared at the Championships. Gustav Hügel and Ulrich Salchow were far ahead of Edgar Syers in the compulsory figures, some of which Syers did not compete, and while Salchow was slightly ahead after the figures, Hügel ultimately won after the free skate. After the Championships, Hügel and Salchow additionally competed in a special figures competition, which Hügel also won. Other post-event displays included a group demonstration by four English skaters and a long jump competition, the winner of whom achieved a distance of 5.02 metres (16.5 ft) on his best jump.

== Results ==
Rank	Name	CF		FS		Total	Points	Places
1	(Austrian Empire) Gustav Hügel	2	1120	1	578	1698	339.60	7
2	(Sweden) Ulrich Salchow	1	1141	2	552	1693	338.60	8
3	(United Kingdom) Edgar Syers	3	518	3	336	854	170.80	15

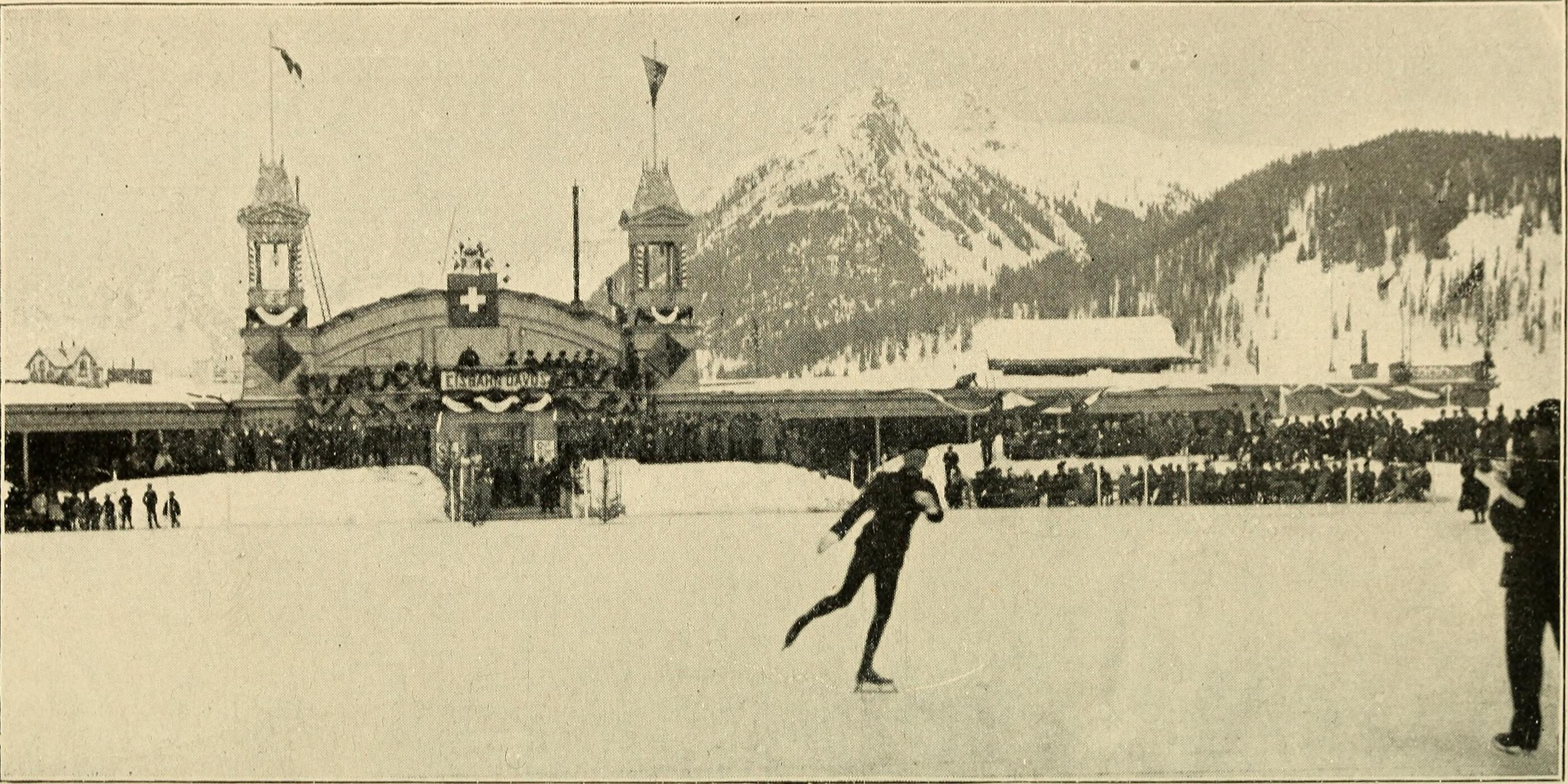
Syers competing

Judges:

- (Switzerland) P. Birum
- (Switzerland) H. Günther
- (Switzerland) J. Olbeter
- (Switzerland) F. Stahel
- (Switzerland) C. Steffens
