= Henryk Krukowicz-Przedrzymirski =

Polish figure skater

Personal information
- Full name: Henryk Juliusz Krukowicz-Przedrzymirski
- Born: 27 March 1889
- Died: 8 September 1944 (aged 55) Warsaw, Poland

Figure skating career
- Country: Austria; Poland
Medal record
Representing Austria
Men's figure skating
European Championships
Bronze medal – third place	1908 Warsaw	Men

Henryk Juliusz Krukowicz-Przedrzymirski (27 March 1889 – 8 September 1944) was a Polish figure skater who competed in men's singles and pair skating.

Representing Austria-Hungary as a single skater, Krukowicz-Przedrzymirski won the bronze medal at the 1908 European Figure Skating Championships in Warsaw. He was also selected to represent Poland at the 1924 Winter Olympics in pair skating, but did not compete. He was killed during the 1944 Warsaw Uprising.

== Competitive highlights ==
=== Men ===
Event	1908
European Championships	3rd

* as S. Przedrzymirski / Representing Austria (due to Partitions of Poland, lasting between 1772 and 1918)

=== Pairs ===
With Olga Przedrzymirska (born Poźniakówna)

Event	1922	1923	1924
Polish Championships	1st	1st	1st
