= Jenny Herz =

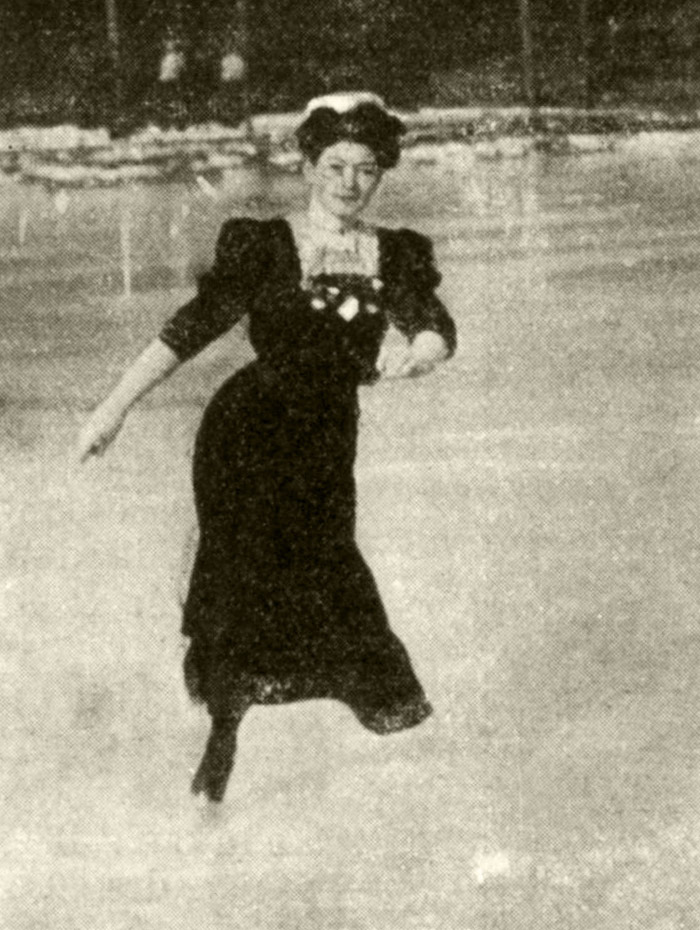

Figure skating career
- Country: Austria
Medal record
Representing Austria
Ladies' figure skating
World Championships
Silver medal – second place	1906 Davos	Ladies
Silver medal – second place	1907 Vienna	Ladies

Jenny Herz was an Austrian figure skater who competed in ladies' singles.

She won silver medals in ladies' single skating at the 1906 and the 1907 World Figure Skating Championships.

== Competitive highlights ==
Event	1906	1907
World Championships	2nd	2nd
