= Wilhelm Zenger =

German figure skater (1877–1911)

Personal information
- Born: 1877
- Died: 1911 (aged 33–34) Munich, Kingdom of Prussia, German Empire

Wilhelm Zenger (died 1911) was a German figure skater.

He won the title of German Champion in men's figure skating twice, in 1900 and 1901. He was the younger brother of Karl Zenger.

== Competitive highlights in figure skating ==
Event	1900	1901
German Championships	1	1
