= Viktor Balck =

Swedish Army officer (1844–1928)

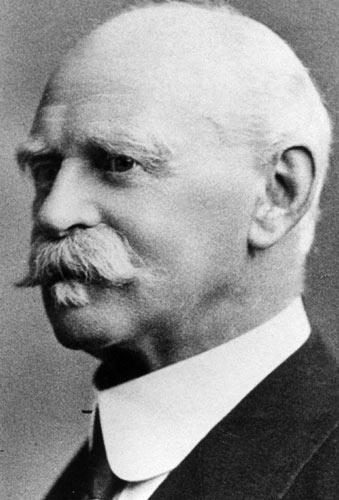
- Viktor Balck
- Born: 25 April 1844; Karlskrona, Sweden
- Died: 31 May 1928 (aged 84); Stockholm, Sweden
- Military career
- Allegiance: Sweden
- Branch: Swedish Army
- Service years: 1861–1914
- Rank: Major General
- Nickname: Viktor Gustaf Balck
- Other work: President of the International Skating Union

Viktor Gustaf Balck (25 April 1844 – 31 May 1928) was a Swedish Army officer and sports personality who was one of the original members of the International Olympic Committee, president of the International Skating Union for 30 years, the driving force behind the Nordic Games, and who is often called "the father of Swedish sports".

== Military career ==
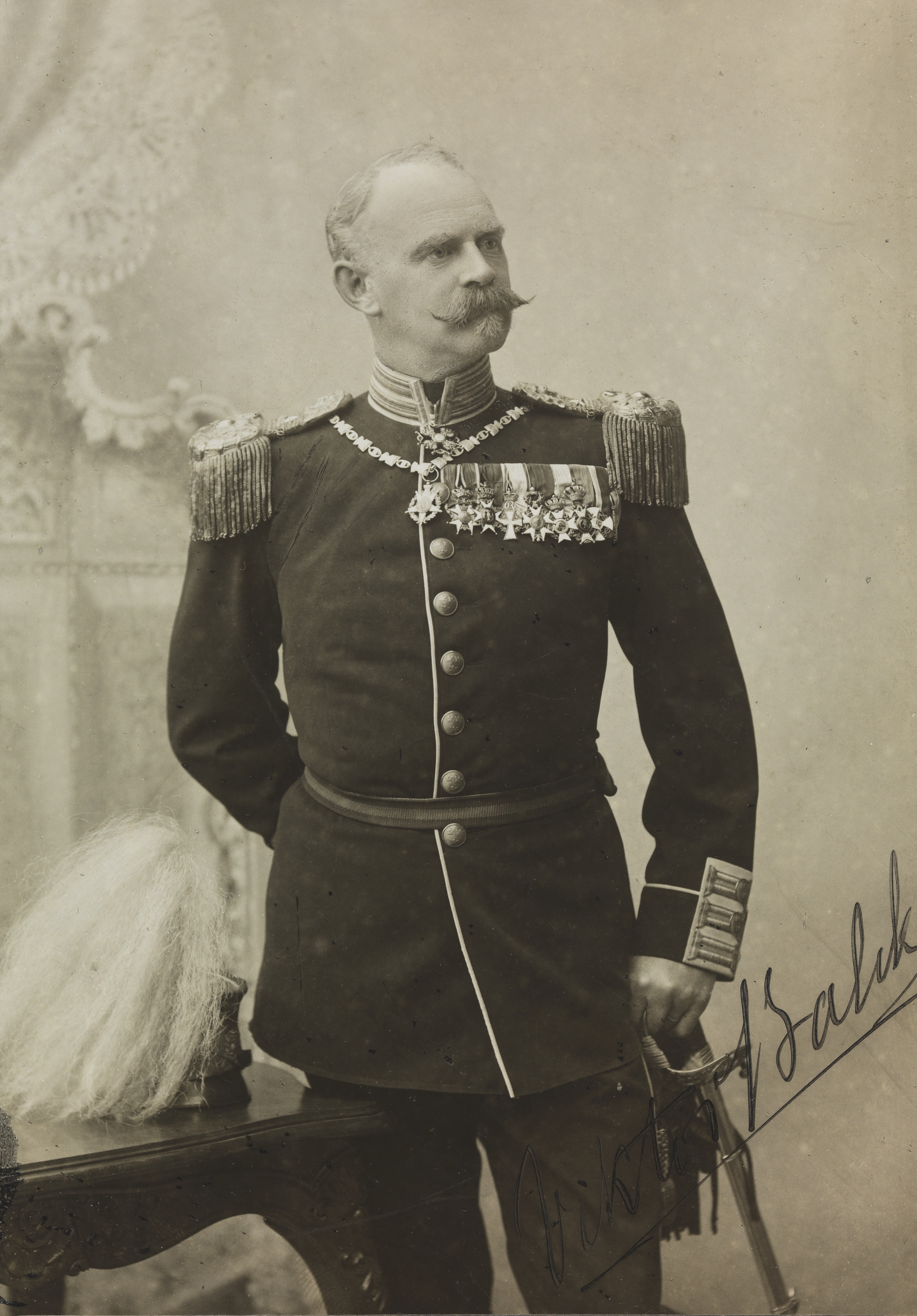
Balck in uniform.

Balck was born in Karlskrona, Sweden, and was a sailor in his youth. In 1861, he joined the Swedish War Academy at Karlberg in Stockholm as an officer cadet of the Swedish Navy. After a while, he switched track to become a cadet for the Swedish Army, and was active in fencing and gymnastics. He stayed on as assistant gymnastics instructor at Karlberg for a while, and in 1866 was commissioned as a second lieutenant in the Närke Regiment. He was promoted to lieutenant in 1875, in the same regiment, and to captain in 1884.

However, Balck's military career came to be devoted almost entirely to gymnastics and sports. He was assistant instructor at Karlberg from 1868 to 1870, then gymnastics teacher at the Swedish Army Riding and Horse-Driving School at Strömsholm, 1870-1872. He became an instructor of military gymnastics and fencing at the Royal Central Gymnastics Institute in 1885, was chief instructor in the same subject, 1887-1909, and the Institute's director 1907-1909. He was promoted to major in the Swedish Army in 1894, to lieutenant colonel in 1900, and to colonel in 1904. In 1909 he transferred to the reserve list and in 1914 received an honorary promotion to major general.

== Career as sports leader ==
Directly after completing his officer's training, Balck studied the pedagogical, military and medical course at the Swedish Central Institute of Gymnastics 1866-1868, and stayed on as assistant teacher at the Institute 1868-1870, while also being an assistant teacher at Karlberg. From 1872, his main activities - both in military and civilian gymnastics and sports - had the Institute as a base.

As a young officer and gymnastics teacher, Balck was of the impression that voluntary gymnastics and sports activities in Sweden, i.e., outside the army and the schools, were undeveloped in comparison to the contemporary situation in many other countries. Determined to change this, from the 1870s he participated in the formation of several sporting clubs and organisations, and the founding of several related journals. During this time, Swedish organised sports took shape, and Balck became one of its leading figures.

== International sports career ==
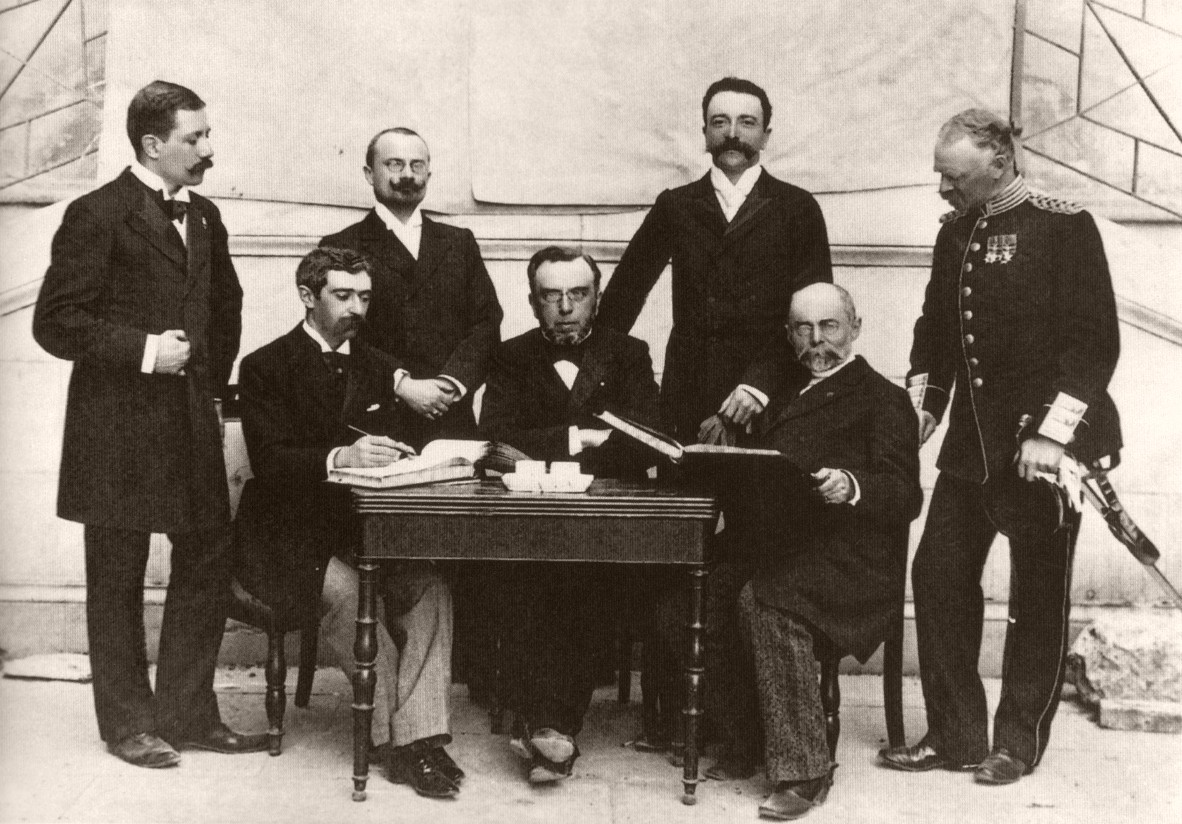
As one of the original members of International Olympic Committee

Balck also became involved in the emerging international sports movement at the end of the 19th century. In 1894 he became one of the original members of International Olympic Committee (IOC), and was one of two vice presidents of the Swedish Olympic Committee from 1913 to his death in 1928. He was also one of the leading figures behind the Nordic Games which were arranged from 1901. He was called "Father of the Nordic Games".

Already in 1894 in IOC, Balck had proposed Stockholm as a venue for the Olympic Games. The official application to arrange the games came in 1908, and despite strong competition from Berlin, Stockholm were chosen to host the 1912 Summer Olympics with Balck a prominent member of the national organising committee.

Balck represented Sweden at a meeting in 1892 regarding the institution of international figure skating competitions, which resulted in the formation of the International Skating Union (ISU). According to figure skating historian James R. Hines, Balck succeeded William J. H. Mulier as president of the ISU when Muller resigned after a scoring controversy at the 1893 European Championships. Balck served as president of the ISU for 30 years, from 1985 to 1925. During his tenure, World Championship events and the Nordic Games were held simultaneously. His ice skating career also included the construction of the "Balck skate".

In recognition of his international sports career, Balck was appointed as an honorary Knight Commander of the British Order of St Michael and St George, so in Britain he was styled as "Viktor Balck, KCMG".

== Awards and decorations ==
Balck's awards:

- Commander First Class of the Order of Vasa
- Knight of the Order of Vasa
- Commander of the Order of the Black Star with star
- Knight Second Class of the Order of the Crown with star
- Knight Second Class of the Order of Saint Stanislaus with star
- Knight Commander of the Order of St Michael and St George (KCMG)
- Commander of the Order of the Redeemer
- Knight Second Class of the Order of the Red Eagle
- Officer of the Legion of Honour
- Knight of the Order of Leopold
- Knight of the Order of the Dannebrog
- Knight of the Order of the Crown of Italy
- Knight of the Order of St. Olav
- Knight of the Order of the Tower and Sword
- Officier d'Académie

Sporting positions
Preceded by Pim Mulier	President of the International Skating Union; 1895–1924	Succeeded by Ulrich Salchow
