= Karl Ollo =

Russian figure skater

Figure skating career
- Country: Russia
- Coach: Nikolai Panin
Medal record
Representing Russia
Men's Figure skating
European Championships
Silver medal – second place	1911 St. Petersburg	Men's singles
Russian Championships
Gold medal – first place	1910 Saint Petersburg	Men's singles
Gold medal – first place	1911 Saint Petersburg	Men's singles
Gold medal – first place	1912 Saint Petersburg	Men's singles
Bronze medal – third place	1905 Saint Petersburg	Men's singles

Karl Antonovich Ollo (Russian: Карл Антонович Олло) was a Russian figure skater and European silver medalist.

Ollo was a three-time champion of Russia in men's single skating (in 1910, 1911, and 1912) and the 1905 bronze medalist. At the international level, he was the 1911 European Championships silver medalist. He was coached by Nikolai Panin.

He died at the front in the First World War.

== Competitive highlights ==
Event	1905	1906	1907	1908	1909	1910	1911	1912
European Championships					4th		2nd	
Russian Championships	3rd					1st	1st	1st
