= Khrenovoye, Novousmansky District, Voronezh Oblast =

Khrenovoye Хреновое
- Selo
- Location within Voronezh Oblast Location within Russia
- Coordinates: 51°39′N 39°34′E
- Country: Russia
- Region: Voronezh Oblast
- District: Novousmansky District
- Time zone: UTC+3:00

Khrenovoye (Russian: Хреновое) is a rural locality (a selo) and the administrative center of Khrenovskoye Rural Settlement, Novousmansky District, Voronezh Oblast, Russia. The population was 999 as of 2010. There are 17 streets.

== Geography ==
Khrenovoye is located on the right bank of the Usmanka River, 16 km east of Novaya Usman (the district's administrative centre) by road. Rykan is the nearest rural locality.
