= Ivan Malinin =

Russian figure skater

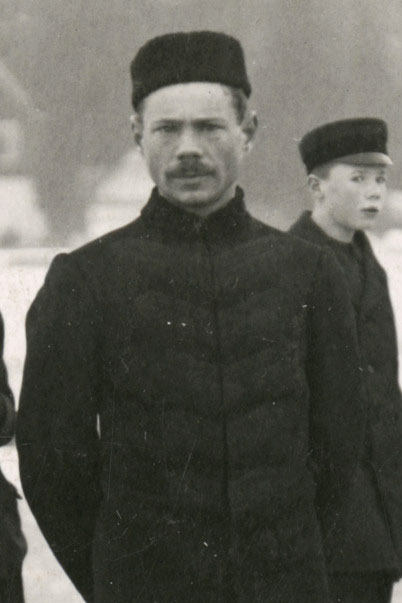
- Malinin in 1912

Figure skating career
- Country: Russia
Medal record
Representing Russia
Men's Figure skating
European Championships
Silver medal – second place	1912 Stockholm	Men's singles

Ivan Pavlovich Malinin (Russian: Иван Павлович Малинин) was a Russian figure skater and European silver medalist.

Malinin was coached by Nikolai Panin and won the silver medal at the 1912 European Championships. He was the 1913 and 1914 champion of Russia in men's single skating.

He died at the front in the First World War.

== Competitive highlights ==
Event	1911	1912	1913	1914
World Championships			4th	6th
European Championships	4th	2nd		
Russian Championships			1st	1st
