= Xenia Caesar =

Russian figure skater

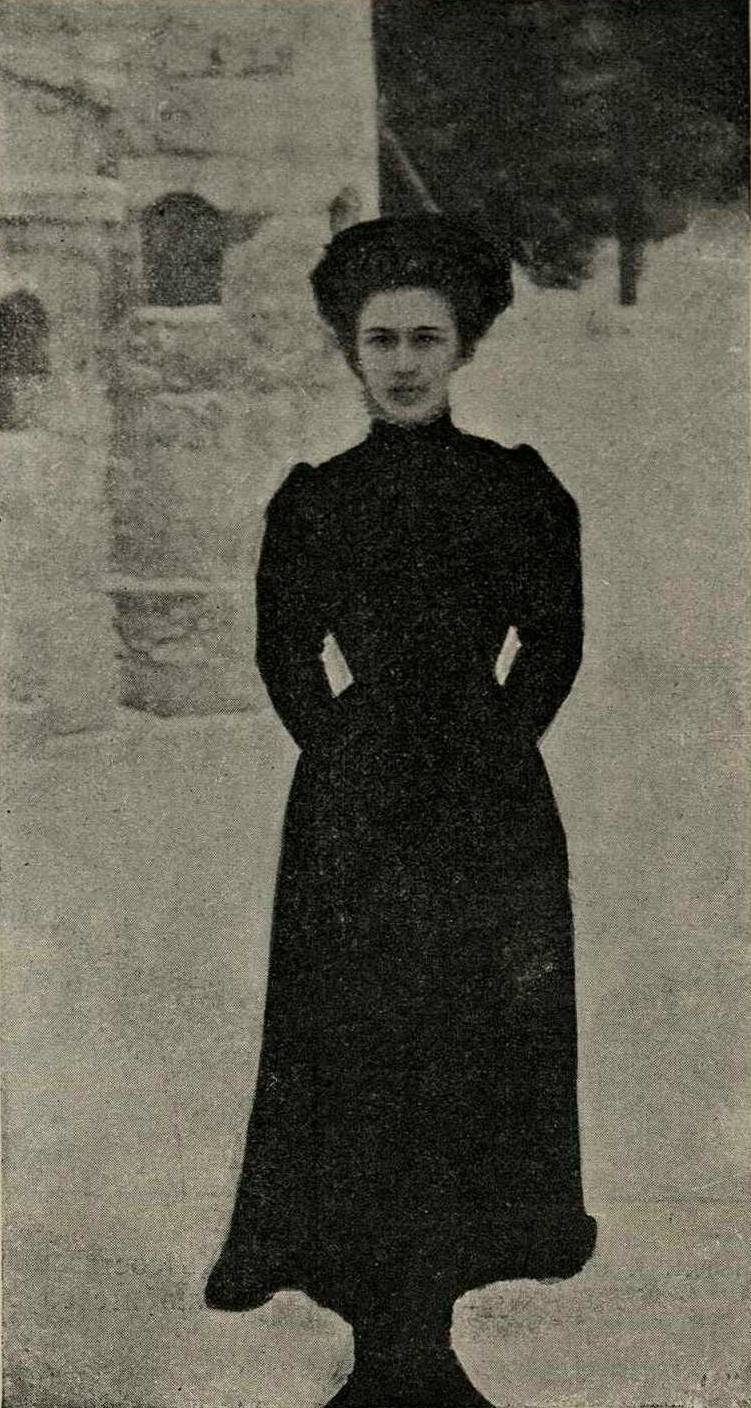
- Caesar in 1913

Personal information
- Born: Xenia Heinrichovna Caesar; 1889
- Died: February 1942 (aged 52–53) Leningrad

Figure skating career
- Country: Russia
- Coach: Nikolai Panin
Medal record
Russian Championships
Gold medal – first place	1911 Saint Petersburg	Ladies’ Singles
Gold medal – first place	1912 Saint Petersburg	Ladies’ Singles
Gold medal – first place	1913 Saint Petersburg	Ladies’ Singles
Gold medal – first place	1914 Saint Petersburg	Ladies’ Singles
Gold medal – first place	1915 Petrograd	Ladies’ Singles

Xenia Heinrichovna Caesar (Russian: Ксения Генриховна Цезар, Kseniya Genrikhovna Tsezar; 1889 – February 1942) was a Russian and Soviet figure skater.

She was a five-time champion of Russia in ladies' single skating (in 1911, 1912, 1914, 1914, and 1915). She was a graduate of the Lesgaft National State University of Physical Education, Sport and Health and taught there, and she also coached figure skating. During World War II, she worked as an army medic.

Her coach was Nikolai Panin. They were both caught in the Siege of Leningrad, where Caesar died in 1942. She is buried in Piskaryovskoye Memorial Cemetery.

== Competitive highlights ==
Event	1911	1912	1913	1914	1915
World Championships				7th	
Russian Championships	1st	1st	1st	1st	1st
