= Khrenovoye, Bobrovsky District, Voronezh Oblast =

Khrenovoye Хреновое
- Selo
- Location within Voronezh Oblast Location within Russia
- Coordinates: 51°07′N 40°17′E
- Country: Russia
- Region: Voronezh Oblast
- District: Bobrovsky District
- Time zone: UTC+3:00

Khrenovoye (Russian: Хреновое) is a rural locality (a selo) and the administrative center of Khrenovskoye Rural Settlement, Bobrovsky District, Voronezh Oblast, Russia. The population was 4,825 (2021 census) and 4,875 as of 2010. There are 33 streets.

== Geography ==
Khrenovoye is located 24 km east of Bobrov (the district's administrative centre) by road. Sloboda is the nearest rural locality.
