= Gwendoline Lycett =

British figure skater

Gwendolyn Lycett
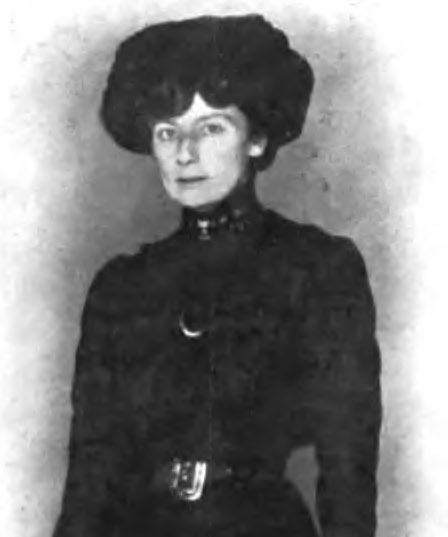
- Lycett in 1910

Personal information
- Born: 19 September 1880
- Died: 6 May 1954 (aged 73)

Figure skating career
- Country: United Kingdom

Frances Gwendoline Lycett (19 September 1880 – 6 May 1954) was a British figure skater. She competed at the 1908 Summer Olympics, the first Olympics where figure skating was contested, and finished fifth out of five skaters. She also participated at the World Figure Skating Championships twice, finishing fourth in 1912.

== Competitive highlights ==
| Event/Year | 1907 | 1908 | 1912 |
|---|---|---|---|
| Summer Olympic Games | | 5th | |
| World Championships | 5th | | 4th |
