= Elsa Rendschmidt =

German figure skater (1886–1969)

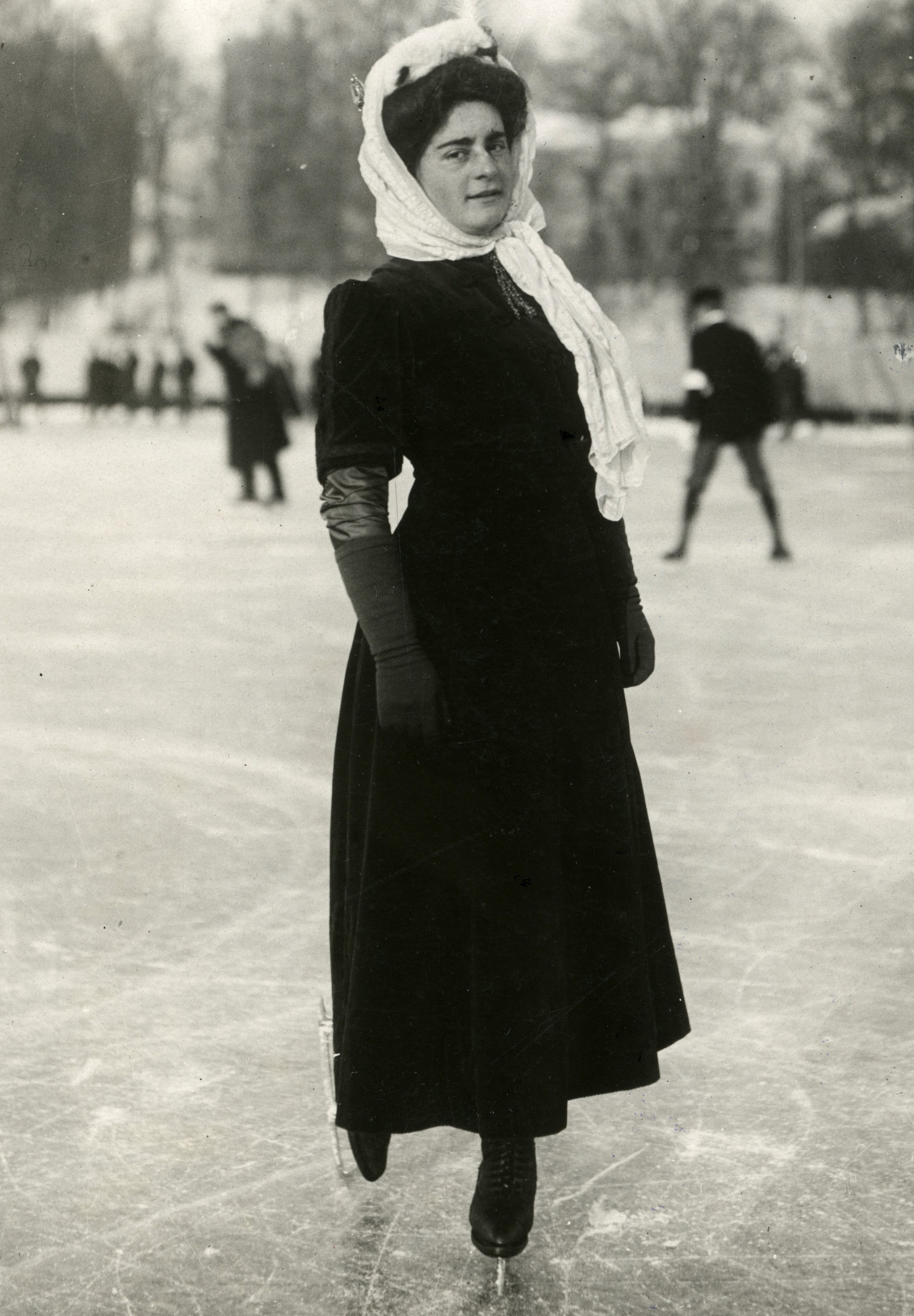
- Rendschmidt at the 1909 Nordic Games

Personal information
- Born: 11 January 1886 Berlin, German Empire
- Died: 9 October 1969 (aged 83) Celle, West Germany

Figure skating career
- Country: Germany
Medal record
Representing Germany
Ladies' Figure skating
Olympic Games
Silver medal – second place	1908 London	Ladies' singles
World Championships
Silver medal – second place	1910 Davos	Ladies' singles
Silver medal – second place	1908 Troppau	Ladies' singles

Olympic medal record

Ladies Figure skating
Silver medal – second place	1908 London	Ladies' singles

Elsa Rendschmidt (11 January 1886 – 9 October 1969) was a German figure skater and the first German woman to compete and win a medal at the Olympic Games.

Rendschmidt won the silver medal at the 1908 Summer Olympics, the first Olympics to include a ladies' figure skating event. She competed in the first ladies' German nationals, which took place in 1911. She skated for the Berliner Schlittschuhclub and won the event, becoming Germany's first ladies' champion. She also competed at the World Championships several times. Her best finish was 2nd (in 1908 and 1910).

A road located in Charlottenburg-Wilmersdorf was named after Rendschmidt in 2006.

== Results ==
Event	1906	1907	1908	1909	1910	1911
Summer Olympics*			2nd			
World Championships	4th	4th	2nd		2nd	
German Championships						1st

- Figure skating was first included at the Summer Olympic games from 1908, moving to the Winter Olympics in 1924
