= Karl Zenger =

German figure skater

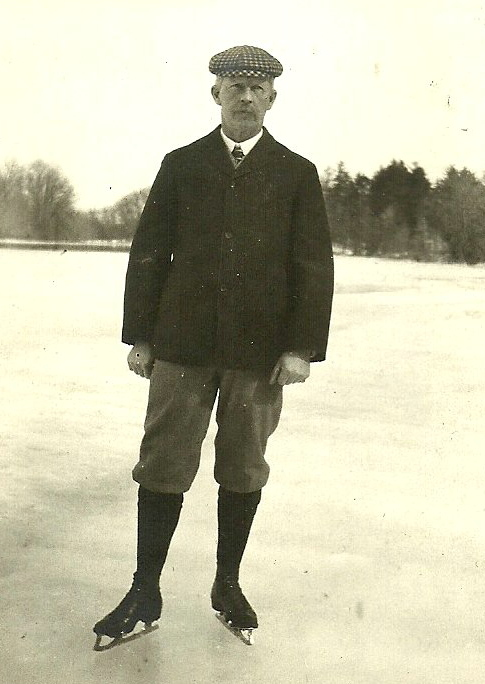
- Karl Zenger

Personal information
- Born: June 3, 1873
- Died: February 19, 1912 (aged 38)

Figure skating career
- Country: Germany
Medal record
Representing Germany
Men's Figure skating
European Championships
Bronze medal – third place	1905 Bonn	Men's singles

Karl Zenger (born 3 June 1873 in Erding; died 19 February 1912 in Haar, Bavaria) was a German figure skater.

Zenger won the title of German Champion in men's figure skating twice, in 1897 and again in 1905. He also won the bronze medal at the European Championship in 1905. He was the older brother of Wilhelm Zenger. Karl Zenger lived around 1900 in Antwerp, Belgium

== Competitive highlights in figure skating ==
Event	1897	1905	1906
World Championships			4
European Championships		3	
German Championships	1	1	2
