= Per Thorén =

Swedish figure skater (1885–1962)

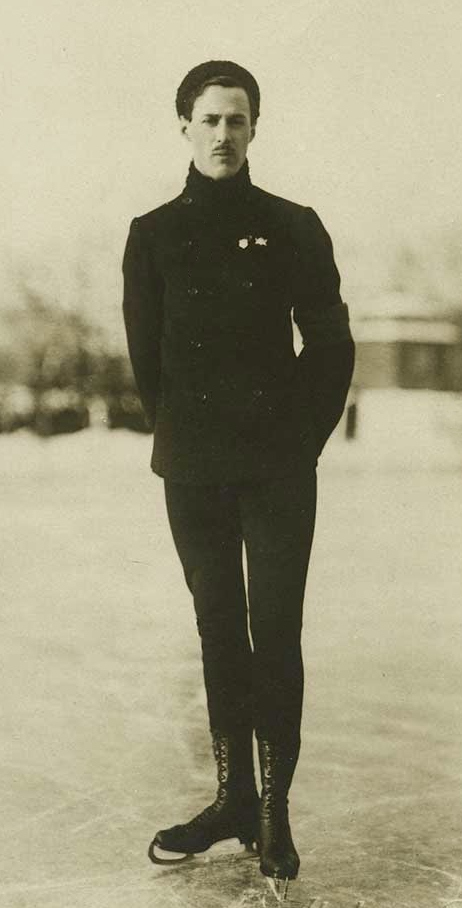
- Thorén in 1909

Personal information
- Born: 28 January 1885 Stockholm, Sweden
- Died: 5 January 1962 (aged 76) Stockholm, Sweden

Figure skating career
- Country: Sweden
- Skating club: SASK, Stockholm
Medal record
Representing Sweden
Olympic Games
Bronze medal – third place	1908 London	Singles
World Championships
Silver medal – second place	1909 Stockholm	Singles
Bronze medal – third place	1905 Stockholm	Singles
European Championships
Gold medal – first place	1911 St. Petersburg	Singles
Bronze medal – third place	1910 Berlin	Singles
Bronze medal – third place	1909 Budapest	Singles
Bronze medal – third place	1906 Davos	Singles

Per Ludvig Julius Thorén (26 January 1885 – 5 January 1962) was a Swedish figure skater in the early 20th century who won a bronze medal at the 1908 Olympic Games. In Europe, the half loop jump, a variation of the loop jump, was often referred to as the Thorén jump.

== Results ==
Event	1904	1905	1906	1907	1908	1909	1910	1911
Winter Olympics					3rd			
World Championships		3rd	5th	4th		2nd	4th	
European Championships			3rd	4th		3rd	3rd	1st
Swedish Championships	2nd	1st	2nd	1st	2nd			
