= Ulrich Salchow =

Swedish figure skater

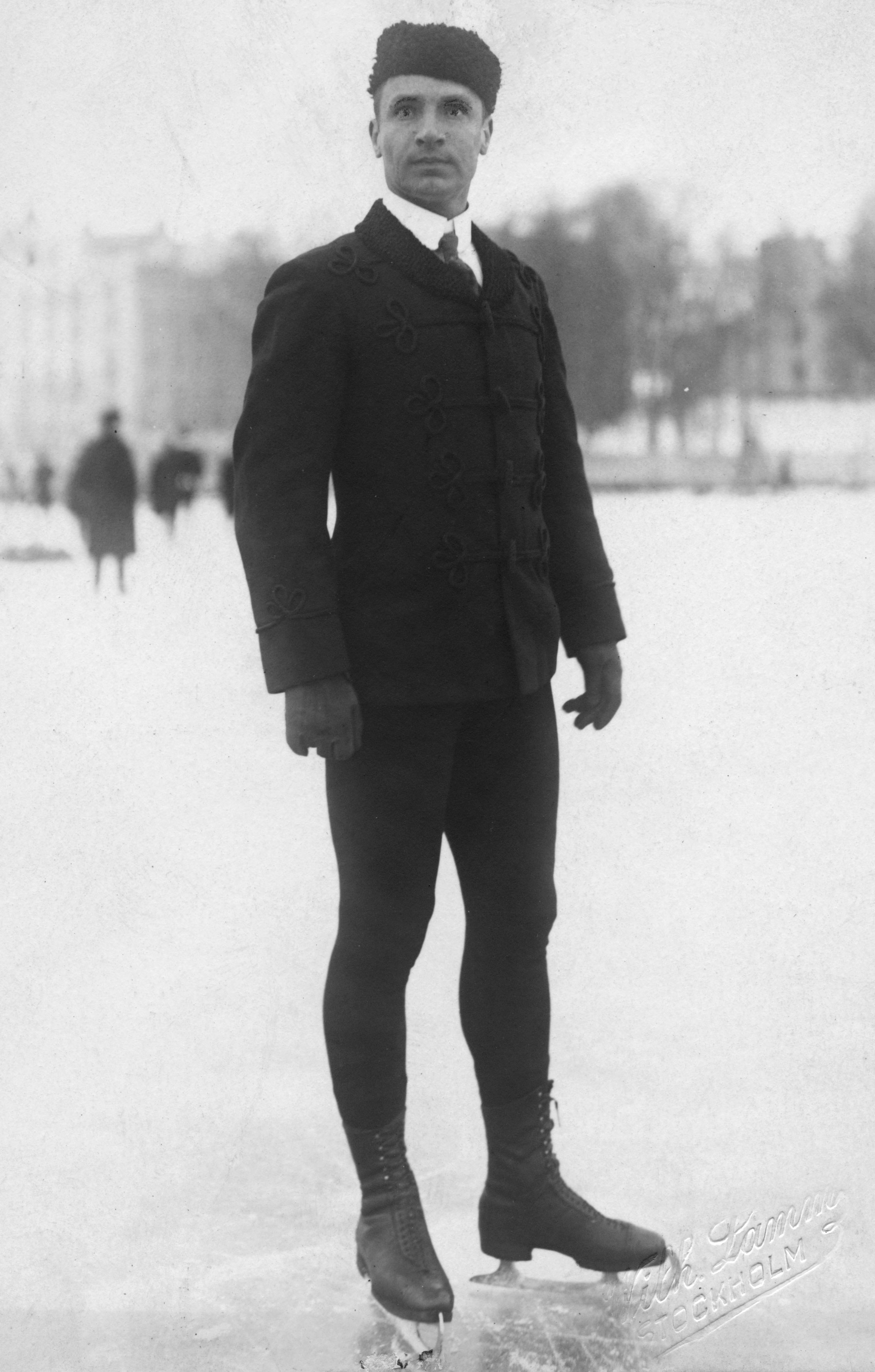
- Portrait of Salchow

Personal information
- Full name: Karl Emil Julius Ulrich Salchow
- Born: 7 August 1877 Copenhagen, Denmark
- Died: 19 April 1949 (aged 71) Stockholm, Sweden

Figure skating career
- Country: Sweden
Medal record
Men's Figure skating
Representing Sweden
Olympic Games
Gold medal – first place	1908 London	Men's singles
World Championships
Gold medal – first place	1911 Troppau	Men's singles
Gold medal – first place	1910 Davos	Men's singles
Gold medal – first place	1909 Stockholm	Men's singles
Gold medal – first place	1908 Troppau	Men's singles
Gold medal – first place	1907 Vienna	Men's singles
Gold medal – first place	1905 Stockholm	Men's singles
Gold medal – first place	1904 Berlin	Men's singles
Gold medal – first place	1903 St. Petersburg	Men's singles
Gold medal – first place	1902 London	Men's singles
Gold medal – first place	1901 Stockholm	Men's singles
Silver medal – second place	1900 Davos	Men's singles
Silver medal – second place	1899 Davos	Men's singles
Silver medal – second place	1897 Stockholm	Men's singles
European Championships
Gold medal – first place	1913 Oslo	Men's singles
Gold medal – first place	1910 Berlin	Men's singles
Gold medal – first place	1909 Budapest	Men's singles
Gold medal – first place	1907 Berlin	Men's singles
Gold medal – first place	1906 Davos	Men's singles
Gold medal – first place	1904 Davos	Men's singles
Bronze medal – third place	1901 Vienna	Men's singles
Gold medal – first place	1900 Berlin	Men's singles
Gold medal – first place	1899 Davos	Men's singles
Gold medal – first place	1898 Trondheim	Men's singles

Karl Emil Julius Ulrich Salchow (7 August 1877 – 19 April 1949) was a Swedish figure skater, who dominated the sport in the first decade of the 20th century.

Salchow won the World Figure Skating Championships ten times, from 1901 to 1905 and from 1907 to 1911. This is still a record, which he shares with Sonja Henie, who also won 10 titles in the 1920s and 1930s, and with Irina Rodnina, who won 10 titles in the 1960s and 1970s. Salchow did not compete in the 1906 World Championships that were held in Munich, as he feared that he would not be judged fairly against Gilbert Fuchs of Germany.

When figure skating was first contested at the Summer Olympic Games in London (1908), Salchow also won the title with ease and became one of the oldest figure skating Olympic champions. In addition, Salchow won the European Championships a record nine times (1898–1900, 1904, 1906–1907, 1909–1910, 1913) and placed second in the World Championships three times.

Salchow was famous for his Salchow Star figure, which he used for a second-place finish at the World Championship in Davos, Switzerland in February 1900.

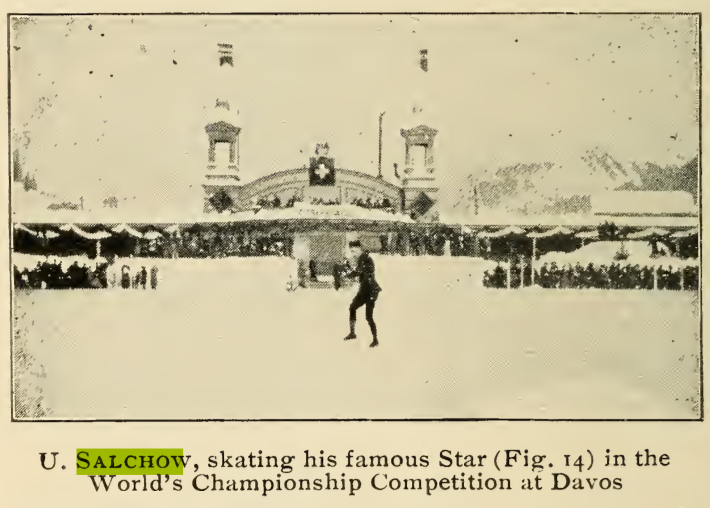
Salchow skating his famous star figure in the 1900 World Championships

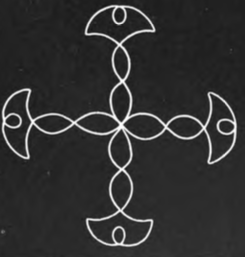
The Salchow Star Figure, as published by George Meagher (1919)

In 1909, Ulrich Salchow first landed a jump in competition in which he took off on the back inside edge and landed on the back outside edge of his other foot. This jump is now known as the Salchow jump in his honor.

Salchow skating in 1911; he performs a Salchow jump near the beginning

After his competitive days, Salchow remained active in the sport and was president of the International Skating Union (ISU) from 1925 to 1937. Furthermore, he was the chairman of AIK in Stockholm between 1928 and 1939 – the leading Swedish club in football, ice hockey, bandy, tennis and other sports.

Ulrich Salchow was married to the dentist Dr. Anne-Elisabeth Salchow.

Salchow died in Stockholm at the age of 71 and was interred there at Norra begravningsplatsen.

== Results ==
Event	1895	1896	1897	1898	1899	1900	1901	1902	1903	1904	1905	1906	1907	1908	1909	1910	1911	1913	1920
Olympics														1st					4th
World Championships			2nd		2nd	2nd	1st	1st	1st	1st	1st		1st	1st	1st	1st	1st		
European Championships				1st	1st	1st	3rd			1st		1st	1st		1st	1st		1st	
Swedish Championships	1st	1st	1st																

== See also ==
- List of Swedes in sports

Sporting positions
Preceded by Viktor Balck	President of the International Skating Union; 1925–1937	Succeeded by Gerrit W. A. van Laer
