= Edgar Syers =

British figure skater

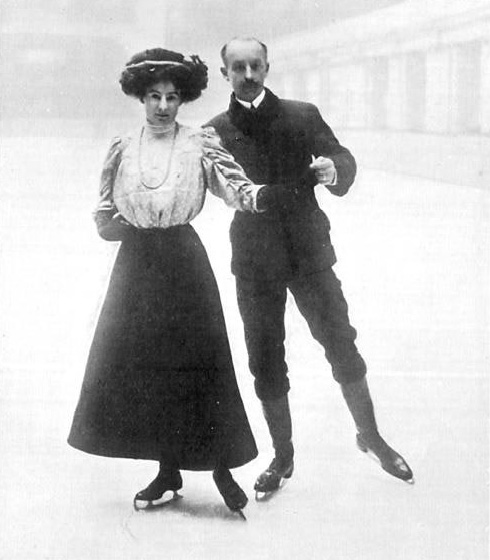
- Madge and Edgar Syers at the 1908 Olympics.

Personal information
- Born: 18 March 1863 Brighton, East Sussex, England
- Died: 16 February 1946 (aged 82) Maidenhead, Berkshire, England

Figure skating career
- Country: United Kingdom
- Partner: Madge Syers
- Skating club: Prince's Skating Club
Medal record
Representing United Kingdom
Men's Figure skating
World Championships
Bronze medal – third place	1899 Davos	Men's singles
Representing United Kingdom
Pairs Figure skating
Olympic Games
Bronze medal – third place	1908 London	Pairs

Edgar Morris Wood Syers (18 March 1863 – 16 February 1946) was a British figure skater who competed in both singles and pair skating. As a singles skater, he won the bronze medal at the 1899 World Championships. At age 45, he competed with his wife Madge Syers at the 1908 London Summer Olympics, coming in last but winning the bronze as only three pairs competed in this event, became the oldest figure skating Olympic medalist. He was also a figure skating coach.

== Results ==
=== Men's singles ===
Event	1899
World Championships	3rd

=== Pairs ===
Event	1908
Summer Olympic Games	3rd
