= Martin Gordan =

German figure skater (1876–1962)

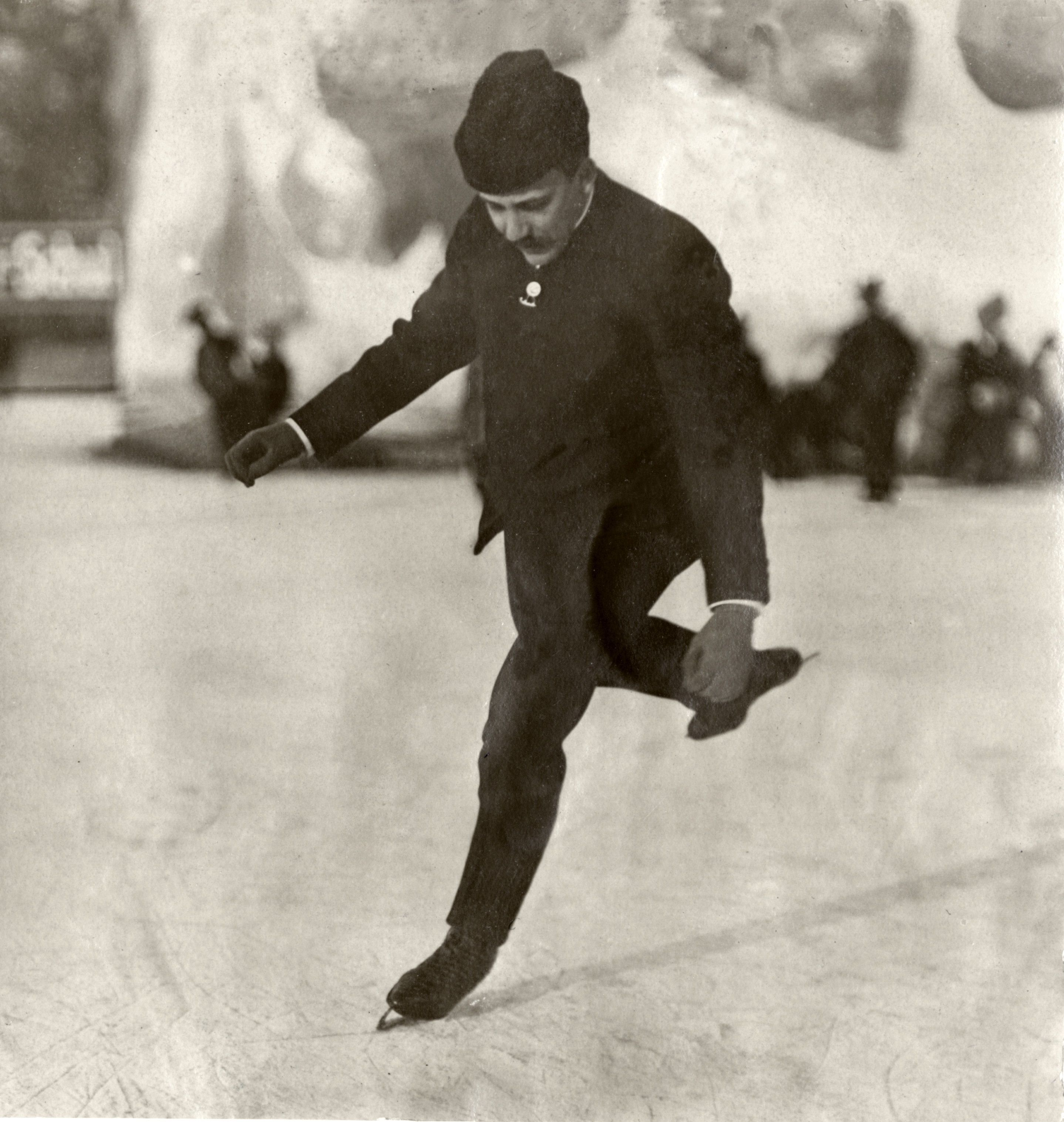
- Martin Gordan (1914)

Personal information
- Born: 15 October 1876
- Died: 22 June 1962 (aged 85)

Figure skating career
- Country: Germany
Medal record
Representing Germany
Men's figure skating
World Championships
Bronze medal – third place	1902 London	Men
Bronze medal – third place	1904 Berlin	Men

Martin Gordan (15 October 1876 - 22 June 1962) was a German figure skater who competed in men's singles.

He won bronze medals in men's single skating at two World Figure Skating Championships: in 1902 and 1904.

== Competitive highlights ==
Event	1899	1900	1901	1902	1903	1904	1905	1906	1907
World Championships				3rd		3rd	5th	7th	6th
European Championships	4th					4th	5th		6th
German Championships							3rd	3rd	
