= Julia Sauter =

German and Romanian figure skater (born 1997)

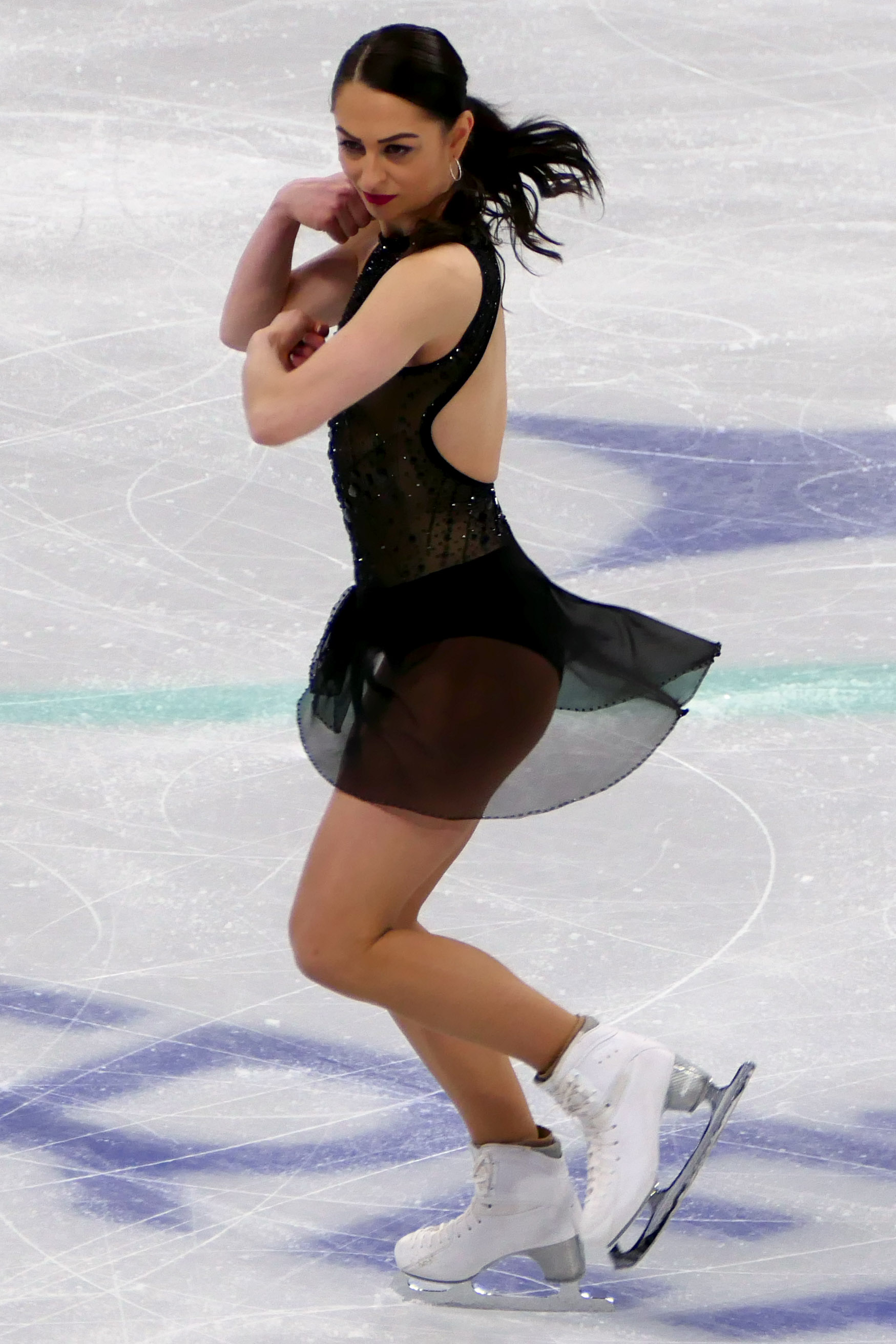
- Julia Sauter at the 2024 World Championships

Personal information
- Full name: Julia Franziska Sauter
- Born: 18 June 1997 (age 29) Weingarten, Germany
- Home town: Ravensburg, Germany
- Height: 1.67 m (5 ft 6 in)

Figure skating career
- Country: Romania (since 2012); Germany (2010–12)
- Discipline: Women's singles
- Coach: Roxana Hartmann; Christopher Boyadji
- Skating club: ACS Corona Brașov
- Began skating: 2002

Medal record
Romanian Championships
| Gold medal – first place | 2014 Brașov | Singles |
| Gold medal – first place | 2015 Brașov | Singles |
| Gold medal – first place | 2017 Miercurea Ciuc | Singles |
| Gold medal – first place | 2019 Otopeni | Singles |
| Gold medal – first place | 2022 Miercurea Ciuc | Singles |
| Gold medal – first place | 2023 Otopeni | Singles |
| Gold medal – first place | 2024 Otopeni | Singles |
| Gold medal – first place | 2025 Otopeni | Singles |
| Gold medal – first place | 2026 Székesfehérvár | Singles |

Julia Franziska Sauter (married name: Sauter-Czarnik; born 18 June 1997) is a German-born Romanian figure skater. Representing Romania, she has won seventeen senior international medals as well as eleven Romanian national titles. She has reached the final segment at four World and four European Championships, with a top-ten result at three European Championships. Sauter represented Romania at the 2026 Winter Olympics.

== Personal life ==
Sauter was born on June 18, 1997 in Weingarten, Württemberg, Germany.

In 2019, while visiting the United States, she met and began dating American ice hockey player Robbie Czarnik. Afterwards, Czarnik moved to Landshut, Germany to be with Sauter. They married in September 2021.

In addition to figure skating, Sauter also worked as a children's aide in a school, a part-time waitress, and as a figure skating coach at her training rink in Ravensburg to pay for her figure skating due to a lack of funding from the German Figure Skating Federation. In 2023, her Romanian club was able to provide her with funding, allowing her to quit her part-time jobs, although she continues to coach and choreograph at her rink.

Sauter has expressed interest in becoming a full-time figure skating coach and choreographer after she retires from competitive figure skating.

Her figure skating role models are Kiira Korpi, Yuna Kim, Kaetlyn Osmond, Carolina Kostner, as well as her coach and choreographer, Roxana Hartmann.

Sauter became a Romanian citizen on October 9, 2025.

== Career ==
=== Early years ===
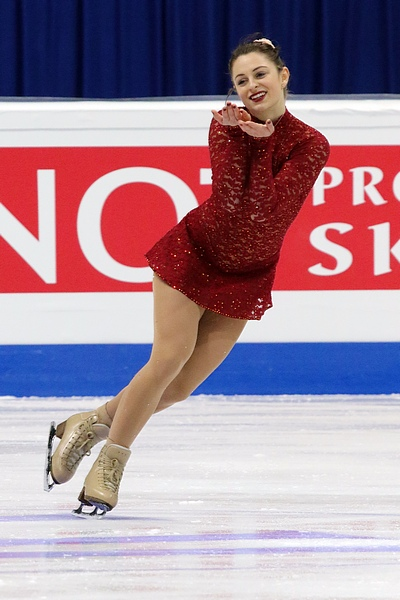
Sauter at the 2016 European Championships

Sauter began figure skating in 2002 at the age of four. Her childhood coaches were Diane Eisele and Silvia Jansson before Marius Negrea began coaching her in 2010 at the age of twelve.

Sauter represented Germany at junior international events in 2010 and 2011.

She made the decision to represent Romania in 2011 at the age of fourteen due to not being invited to enter the elite group of figure skaters in Germany because at the time, she was unable to perform specific elements that were required of her. As a result, Sauter had to sit out of competitions for a whole year as is required when figure skaters switch countries. In March 2013, she made her first international appearance for Romania. She competed at three consecutive World Junior Championships, from 2014 to 2016, but she never made the cut for the free skate.

=== 2018–19 season: World Championships debut ===
Sauter began the season at the 2018 Crystal Skate of Romania, winning the silver medal, fourteenth at the 2018 CS Alpen Trophy, and fifth at the 2018 Warsaw Cup.

At the 2019 European Championships in Minsk, Belarus, Sauter qualified to the final segment of an ISU Championship for the first time in her career. She went on to finish fourteenth overall.

Making her World Championship debut at the 2019 edition in Saitama, Japan, Sauter placed twenty-ninth in the short program and didn't advance to the free skate.

=== 2019–20 season and 2020–21 season ===
Sauter left longtime coach, Marius Negrea after deciding to move from Ravensburg to Landshut, where her newlywed husband was living. She did not compete during the 2019–20 season, which she later cited was due to a lack of motivation, having achieved her dream of finishing in the top 30 at a World Championships the previous season as well as an ankle injury that kept her off the ice for six weeks. She also missed the 2020–21 season due to the COVID-19 pandemic preventing her from getting any ice time to train.

In October 2020, Sauter decided to return to coach, Marius Negrea and worked virtually with him until August 2021 when the ice rink in Ravensburg re-opened. Prior to that, Sauter trained in Atlanta, Georgia from April to July, where her husband's parents live, and worked with Negrea virtually.

=== 2021–22 season ===
Making her return to competition at the 2021 CS Lombardia Trophy, Sauter finished thirteenth. She went on to place twentieth at the 2021 CS Nebelhorn Trophy, and third at the 2021 Trophée Métropole Nice Côte d'Azur.

At the 2022 Romanian Championships, Sauter won her sixth national title. She then finished fourth at both the 2021 Skate Celje and the 2021 Santa Claus Cup.

Although assigned to compete at the 2022 European Championships, Sauter had to withdraw from the event after testing positive for COVID-19. She then went on to win bronze at both 2022 Skate Helena and the 2022 Dragon Trophy.

Competing at the World Championships for the second time in her career, in Montpellier, France, Sauter qualified for the free skate after placing nineteenth in the short program. She came eighteenth in the free skate, moving up to eighteenth place overall.

=== 2022–23 season: Grand Prix debut ===
Sauter began the season by finishing eighth at the 2022 Trophée Métropole Nice Côte d'Azur and winning silver at the 2022 Crystal Skate of Romania. She was invited to her first Grand Prix event, the 2022 MK John Wilson Trophy, where she placed tenth. She then won silver medals at the 2023 Bosphorus Cup and 2023 EduSport Trophy. At the EduSport Trophy, Sauter landed her first ever triple Lutz jump in competition at the age of twenty-five.

At the 2023 European Championships in Espoo, Finland, Sauter achieved a top ten finish for Romania, which for the first time would allow two Romanian woman to enter the next year. She then went on to win a gold medal at the 2023 Bellu Memorial.

Sauter set up a GoFundMe page to pay for the travel expenses to go to the 2023 World Championships in Saitama, Japan. At the World Championships, Sauter placed twenty-second in the short program and twentieth in the free skate, finishing twentieth overall.

=== 2023–24 season ===
In her first competition of the season, Sauter was sixth at the 2023 CS Nepela Memorial. She appeared at three other minor internationals, including a second consecutive silver medal at the EduSport Trophy. Sauter was ill before the 2024 European Championships and was only able to resume training two weeks beforehand. She came ninth overall. This was the best result ever for a Romanian women's representative at the European Championships. Sauter said of her result that "It feels pretty good to have made the Top 10 again." and that she was pleased to be competing at the Championships with another Romanian woman.

At the 2024 World Championships, Sauter came in twenty-seventh place with mistakes on two of her jumping passes in the short program, and she did not make the free skate. The result came as a shock and deep disappointment to her, as she felt she was well prepared for the competition.

=== 2024–25 season ===
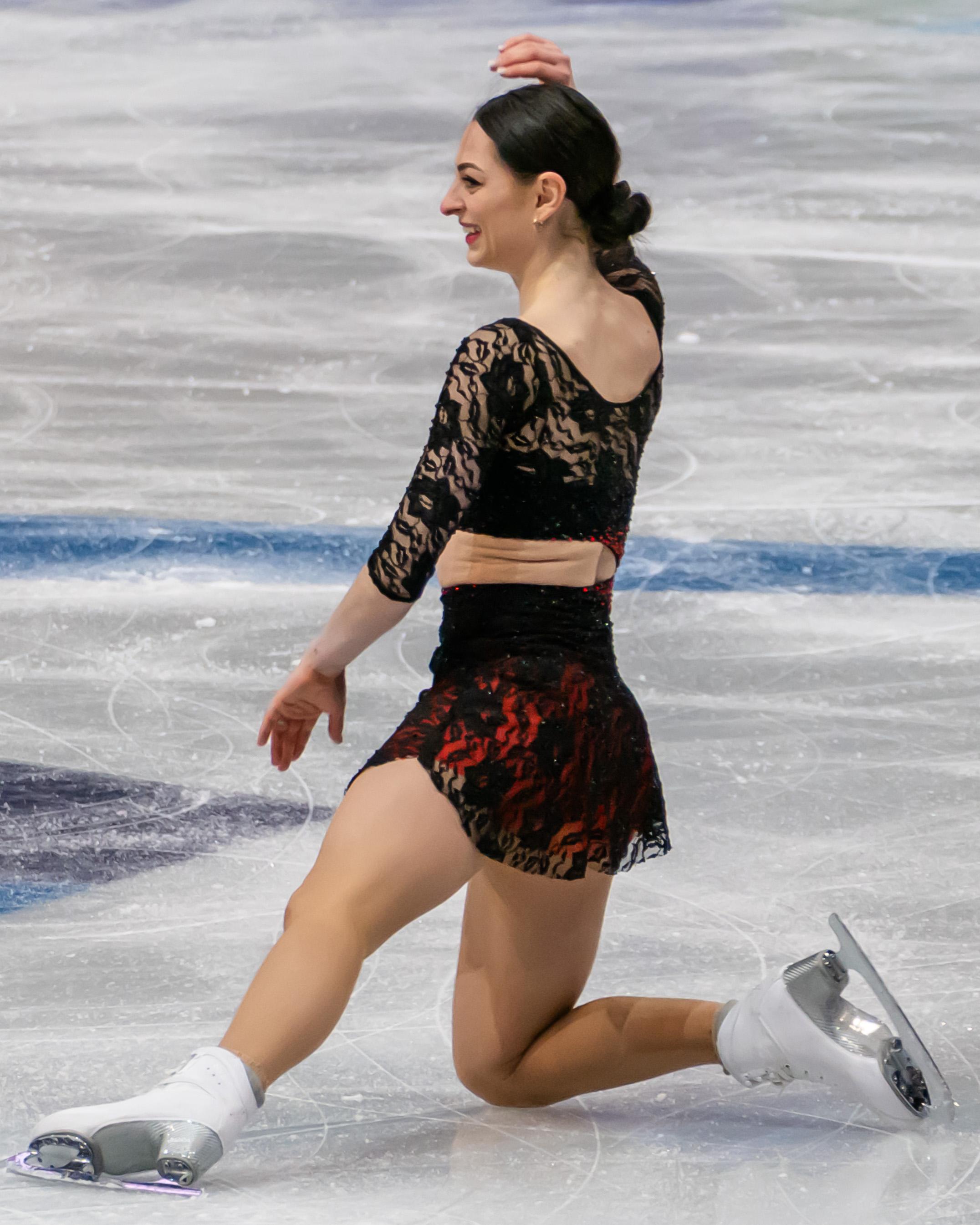
Sauter after finishing her short program at the 2025 World Championships

Sauter went to the United States to train during the summer. However, she began to struggle with panic attacks. She also struggled to motivate herself after failing to make the free skate at the World Championships. Although her mental health improved by the end of the summer, she experienced severe inflammation in her shin in September and could not walk.

She began the season by competing on the 2024–25 ISU Challenger Series, finishing sixth at the 2024 CS Budapest Trophy and seventeenth at the 2024 CS Warsaw Cup. Between the two events, Sauter won the 2024 Crystal Skate of Romania. The event doubled as the Romanian Figure Skating Championships, and Sauter won her ninth national title. Sauter returned to her normal training schedule in mid-October.

In December, Sauter decided to part ways with longtime coach, Marius Negrea, and make Roxana Hartmann, who had previously mainly worked as her choreographer, her new head coach. In addition, Sauter also began working with Christopher Boyadji as well as Simona Punga. The following month, she competed at the 2025 European Championships in Tallinn, Estonia, where she placed seventh. This was the best-ever placement for a Romanian woman at the European Championships.

Weeks before the 2025 World Championships, Sauter set up a GoFundMe page to help pay for her and her coaches' travel expenses. She also had issues with her application for Romanian citizenship.

At the World Championships, Sauter placed sixteenth in the short program, which both qualified her for the free skate and won an Olympic quota for Romania. In the free skate, she dropped to nineteenth place overall. Following the event, Sauter shared that she was proud to have won the quota for Romania.

=== 2025–26 season: Milano Cortina Olympics ===
Sauter opened the season by finishing eleventh at the 2025 CS Nebelhorn Trophy. She then went on to place fifth at the 2025 Swiss Open and fourth at the 2025 Cup of Innsbruck. In December, she won gold at the 2025 Skate Fehervar. One month later, Sauter competed at the 2026 European Championships in Sheffield, England, United Kingdom, where she earned personal best free skate and combined total scores, finishing in eleventh place overall. That same month, it was announced that Sauter and ski jumper Daniela Toth were selected as flag bearers for Romania in the upcoming Olympic opening ceremony.

In February, Sauter made her Olympic debut. She placed sixteenth in both program segments and concluded the event in 17th overall. Sauter scored a personal best, and her placement was the highest thus far for a Romanian women's singles competitor at the Olympics. She credited her success to improving her mental training.

One month following the Olympics, Sauter competed at the 2026 World Championships. Before her short program, she experienced a panic attack, leading her to single her opening triple Lutz jump: "Before my short program, I had a panic attack. Suddenly, I didn’t know what was happening or where I was. But everything happens for a reason. I'm glad that I still qualified for the free skate." Following her free skate, she shared, "The Olympics were my high, and the last four weeks I really had to push myself through it. It was hard, and I'm really proud of what I achieved. I mean, I made it through to the final, that was the first goal." She finished in twenty-second place overall.

== Programs ==
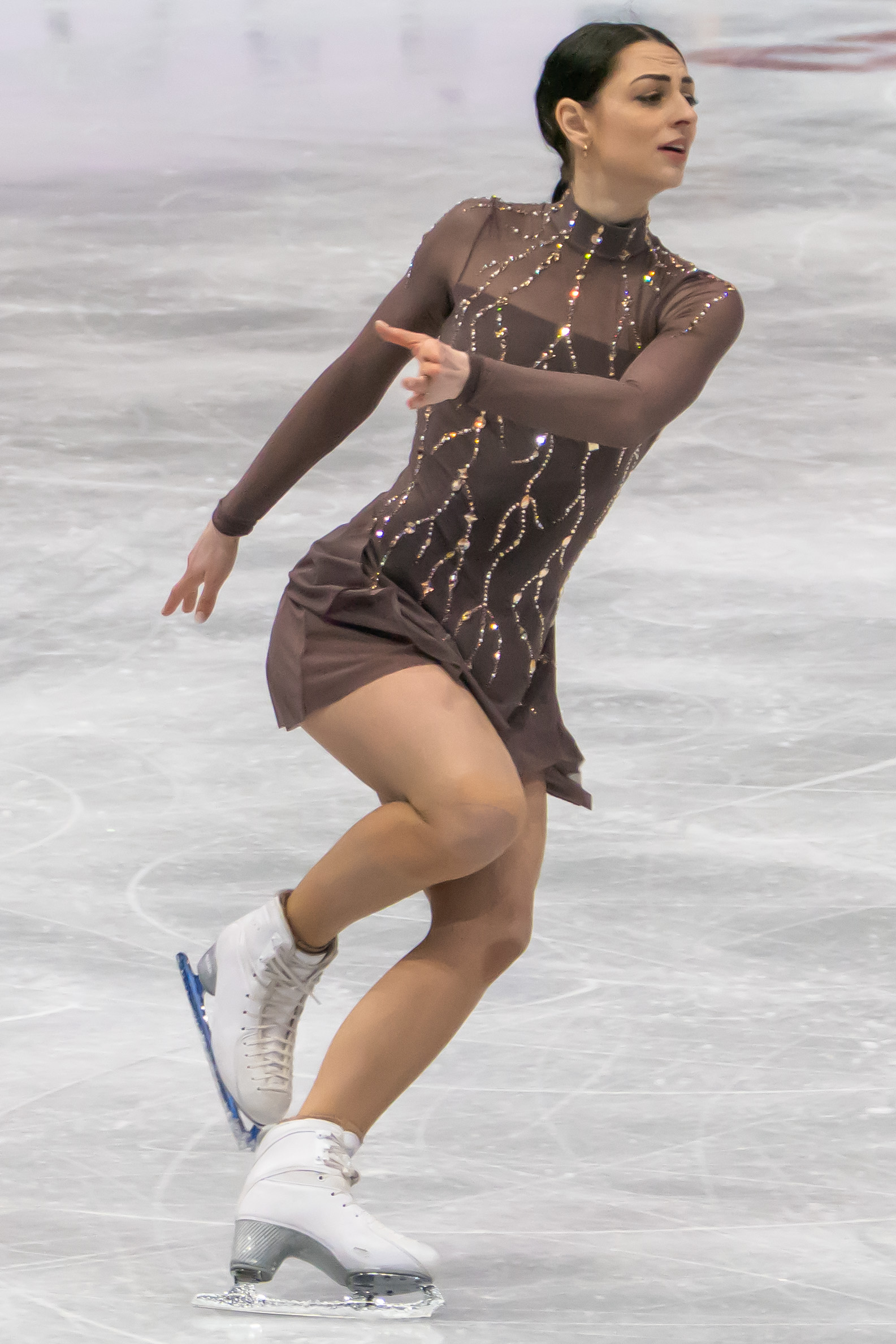
Sauter during the free skate at the 2025 World Championships

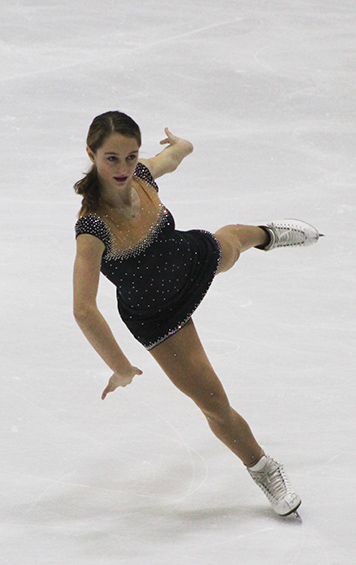
Sauter in 2015

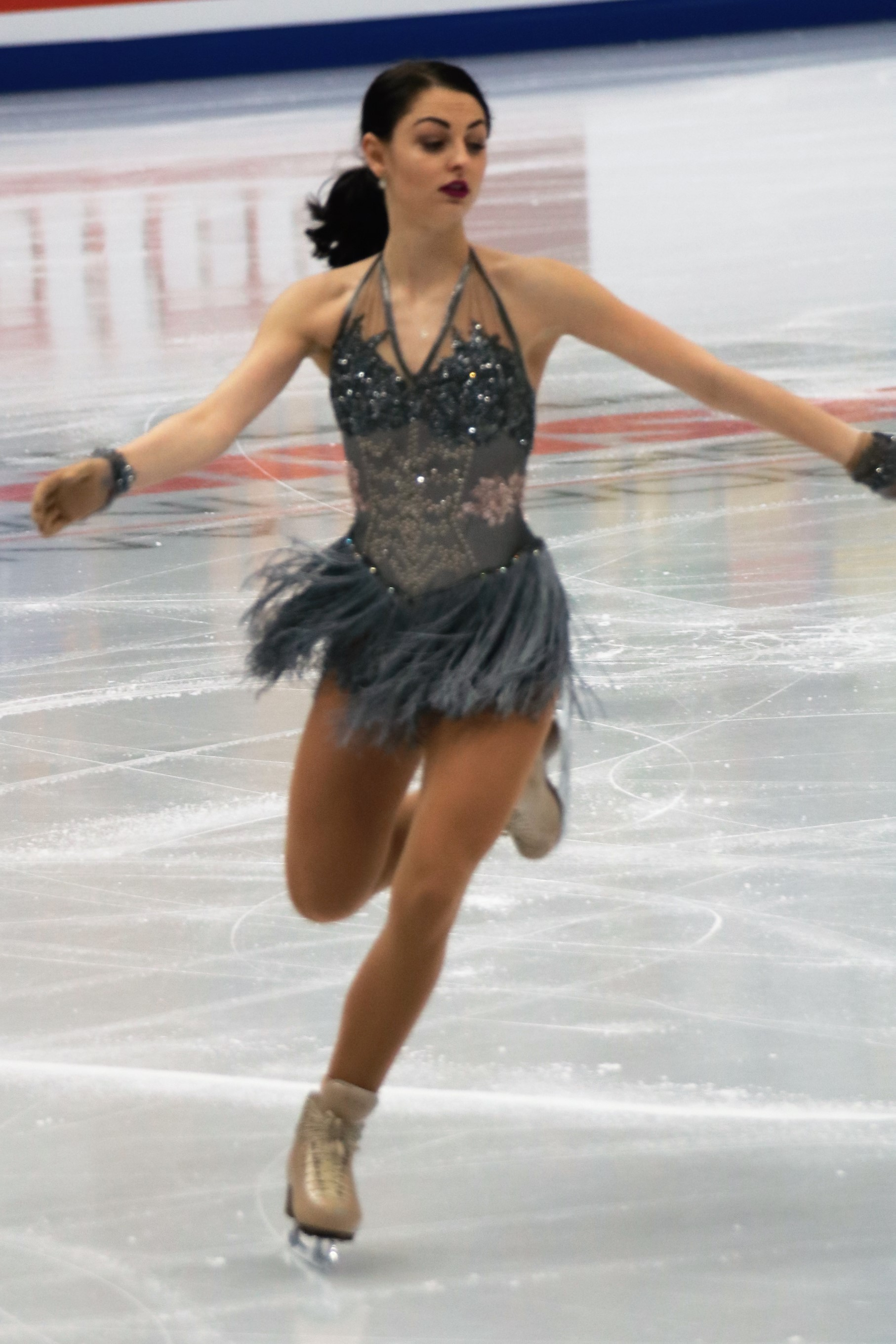
Sauter at the 2018 European Championships

| Season | Short program | Free skating | Exhibition |
|---|---|---|---|
| 2026–2027 | Say You Love Me by Jessie Ware | Circles (based on Ludovico Einaudi "Experience") by Greta Svabo Bech & Ludovico Einaudi; Pathos; Experience (Starkey Remix) by Ludovico Einaudi | |
| 2025–2026 | Seven Nation Army by The White Stripes performed by Haley Reinhart for Scott Bradlee's Postmodern Jukebox choreo. by Julia Sauter | That Home by The Cinematic Orchestra; Rain, in Your Black Eyes by Ezio Bosso; To Build a Home by The Cinematic Orchestra choreo. by Roxana Hartmann | Who I Am by Wyn Starks; El Tango de Roxanne (from Moulin Rouge!) performed by Ewan McGregor & José Feliciano |
| 2024–2025 | Una noche más by Yasmin Levy choreo. by Roxana Hartmann, Julia Sauter | That Home by The Cinematic Orchestra; Rain, in Your Black Eyes by Ezio Bosso; To Build a Home by The Cinematic Orchestra choreo. by Roxana Hartmann; Inspiration by Florian Christl & The Modern String Quintet choreo. by Dasa Grm | |
| 2023–2024 | Oh My God by Adele choreo. by Roxana Hartmann, Julia Sauter | Inspiration by Florian Christl & The Modern String Quintet choreo. by Dasa Grm | |
| 2022–2023 | In This Shirt by The Irrepressibles choreo. by Roxana Hartmann | Unsteady by X Ambassadors, Erich Lee choreo. by Roxana Hartmann | |
| 2021–2022 | I Can't Go On Without You by Kaleo choreo. by Roxana Hartmann | Unsteady by X Ambassadors, Erich Lee choreo. by Roxana Hartmann | |
| 2018–2019 | Earned It by The Weeknd performed Madilyn Bailey choreo. by Roxana Hartmann | Jumping Jack by Big Bad Voodoo Daddy; Circles performed by Greta Svabo Bech; Booty Swing by Parov Stelar choreo. by Roxana Hartmann | |
| 2017–2018 | Burlesque; You Haven't Seen the Last of Me performed by Cher; Show Me How You Burlesque performed by Christina Aguilera choreo. by Roxana Hartmann | Jumping Jack by Big Bad Voodoo Daddy; Circles performed by Greta Svabo Bech; Booty Swing by Parov Stelar choreo. by Roxana Hartmann | |
| 2015–2017 | What a Wonderful World performed by Celine Dion choreo. by Amani Fancy, Roxana Hartmann | Adiós Nonino by Astor Piazzolla; Esperanza; El Conquistador by Maxime Rodriguez choreo. by Amani Fancy, Roxana Hartmann | |
| 2014–2015 | Feeling Good performed by Michael Bublé choreo. by Amani Fancy | Beethoven's 5 Secrets by OneRepublic, The Piano Guys choreo. by Roxana Hartmann | |
| 2013–2014 | Dancing with the Muse by Chris Spheeris choreo. by Roxana Hartmann | Beethoven's 5 Secrets by OneRepublic, The Piano Guys choreo. by Roxana Hartmann | |

== Competitive highlights ==
- GP – Event of the ISU Grand Prix Series
- JGP – Event of the ISU Junior Grand Prix Series
- CS – Event of the ISU Challenger Series
- TBD – Assigned
- WD – Withdrew from competition

Competition placements at senior level
| Season | 2012–13 | 2013–14 | 2014–15 | 2015–16 | 2016–17 | 2017–18 | 2018–19 | 2021–22 | 2022–23 | 2023–24 | 2024–25 | 2025–26 | 2026–27 |
|---|---|---|---|---|---|---|---|---|---|---|---|---|---|
| Winter Olympics | | | | | | | | | | | | 17th | |
| World Championships | | | | | | | 29th | 18th | 20th | 27th | 19th | 22nd | |
| European Championships | | | 35th | 27th | 25th | 29th | 14th | WD | 10th | 9th | 7th | 11th | |
| Romanian Championships | 2nd | 1st | 1st | 1st | 1st | | 1st | 1st | 1st | 1st | 1st | 1st | 1st |
| GP NHK Trophy | | | | | | | | | | | | | TBD |
| GP Wilson Trophy | | | | | | | | | 10th | | | | |
| CS Budapest Trophy | | | | | | | | | | | 6th | | 2nd |
| CS Golden Spin of Zagreb | | | | | | | | | WD | | | | |
| CS Inge Solar | | | | | | | 14th | | | | | | |
| CS Lombardia Trophy | | | | | | | | 13th | | | | | |
| CS Nebelhorn Trophy | | | 11th | | | WD | | 20th | | | | 11th | |
| CS Nepela Memorial | | | | | | | | | WD | 6th | | | 7th |
| CS Warsaw Cup | | | | | | | | | | | 17th | | |
| Balkan Games | | | | | | 1st | | | | | | | |
| Bavarian Open | | | 10th | | 11th | | | | WD | | | | |
| Bellu Memorial | | | | | | | | | 1st | | | | |
| Bosphorus Cup | | | | | | | | | 2nd | | | | |
| Challenge Cup | | | | | | | WD | | | | | | |
| Coupe du Printemps | | | | | | 5th | | | | | | | |
| Cup of Innsbruck | | | | | | | | | | | | 4th | |
| Cup of Nice | | | | 18th | | | | 3rd | 8th | | | | |
| Dragon Trophy | | | | | 6th | | | 3rd | 2nd | WD | | | |
| EduSport Trophy | | | | | | WD | | | 2nd | 2nd | | | |
| Egna Spring Trophy | | | | | | 3rd | | | | | | | |
| Golden Bear of Zagreb | | | | | 18th | | | | | | | | |
| Merano Cup | | | | | 9th | | | WD | | | | | |
| Santa Claus Cup | | | 3rd | | 3rd | | | 9th | | | | | |
| Skate Celje | | | | | | | | 4th | | | | | |
| Skate Fehervar | | | | | | | | | | | | 1st | |
| Skate Helena | | | | | | | | 3rd | | | | | |
| Sofia Trophy | | | | | | | | | | | 3rd | | |
| Swiss Open | | | | | | | | | | | | 5th | |
| Tallinn Trophy | | | | | | | | | | 4th | | | |
| Tirnavia Ice Cup | | | | | | | | | | 1st | | | |
| Warsaw Cup | | | | | | | 5th | | | | | | |
| Crystal Skate | | | | | | | | | | | | | 2nd |

Competition placements at junior level
| Season | 2012–13 | 2013–14 | 2014–15 | 2015–16 |
|---|---|---|---|---|
| World Junior Championships | | 34th | 25th | 32nd |
| Romanian Championships | 1st | | 1st | 1st |
| JGP Croatia | | | 21st | |
| Bavarian Open | | 9th | | |
| Coupe du Printemps | 4th | | | |
| Crystal Skate | | | | 1st |
| Dragon Trophy | | | | 1st |
| Mentor Toruń Cup | | | | 7th |

=== For Germany ===
International: Junior
| Event | 2010–11 | 2011–12 |
|---|---|---|
| Bavarian Open | 15th | |
| Santa Claus Cup | 10th | |
National
| German Youth Champ. | 15th J | 21st J |

== Detailed results ==
ISU personal best scores in the +5/-5 GOE System
| Segment | Type | Score | Event |
|---|---|---|---|
| Total | TSS | 190.93 | 2026 Winter Olympics |
| Short program | TSS | 65.53 | 2026 CS Budapest Trophy |
| Short program | TES | 34.71 | 2024 CS Budapest Trophy |
| Short program | PCS | 30.33 | 2026 CS Nepela Memorial |
| Free skating | TSS | 127.80 | 2026 Winter Olympics |
| Free skating | TES | 66.28 | 2026 Winter Olympics |
| Free skating | PCS | 61.52 | 2026 Winter Olympics |

=== Senior level ===
Results in the 2024–25 season
| Date | Event | SP | | FS | | Total | |
| Date | Event | P | Score | P | Score | P | Score |
|---|---|---|---|---|---|---|---|
| Oct 11–13, 2024 | (Hungary) 2024 CS Budapest Trophy | 6 | 62.98 | 11 | 94.77 | 6 | 157.75 |
| Oct 23–27, 2024 | 2024 Crystal Skate of Romania | 1 | 52.92 | 2 | 88.49 | 1 | 141.41 |
| Oct 23–27, 2024 | (Romania) 2024 Romanian Championships (Note: In some years, the Romanian Championships are contested as part of the Crystal Skate of Romania.) | 1 | —N/a | 1 | —N/a | 1 | —N/a |
| Nov 20–24, 2024 | (Poland) 2024 CS Warsaw Cup | 17 | 46.03 | 17 | 89.12 | 17 | 133.81 |
| Jan 7–12, 2025 | (Bulgaria) 2025 Sofia Trophy | 2 | 63.46 | 4 | 112.59 | 3 | 176.05 |
| Jan 28 – Feb 2, 2025 | (Estonia) 2025 European Championships | 8 | 61.96 | 10 | 110.68 | 7 | 172.64 |
| Mar 24-30, 2025 | (United States) 2025 World Championships | 16 | 59.88 | 20 | 102.73 | 19 | 162.61 |

Results in the 2025–26 season
| Date | Event | SP | | FS | | Total | |
| Date | Event | P | Score | P | Score | P | Score |
|---|---|---|---|---|---|---|---|
| Sep 25–27, 2025 | (Germany) 2025 CS Nebelhorn Trophy | 11 | 54.75 | 11 | 89.96 | 11 | 144.71 |
| Oct 23–26, 2025 | (Switzerland) 2025 Swiss Open | 7 | 49.74 | 5 | 108.18 | 5 | 157.92 |
| Nov 13–16, 2025 | (Austria) 2025 Cup of Innsbruck | 1 | 56.92 | 5 | 98.22 | 4 | 155.14 |
| Dec 4–7, 2025 | (Hungary) 2025 Skate Fehervar | 1 | 59.11 | 1 | 117.06 | 1 | 176.17 |
| Jan 13–18, 2026 | (United Kingdom) 2026 European Championships | 18 | 52.53 | 6 | 121.84 | 11 | 174.37 |
| Feb 17–19, 2026 | (Italy) 2026 Winter Olympics | 16 | 63.13 | 16 | 127.80 | 17 | 190.93 |
| Mar 24–29, 2026 | (Czech Republic) 2026 World Championships | 23 | 52.67 | 18 | 106.84 | 22 | 159.51 |

Results in the 2026–27 season
| Date | Event | SP | | FS | | Total | |
| Date | Event | P | Score | P | Score | P | Score |
|---|---|---|---|---|---|---|---|
| Sep 24–27, 2026 | (Slovakia) 2026 CS Nepela Memorial | 1 | 64.03 | 7 | 99.20 | 7 | 163.23 |
| Oct 15–18, 2026 | (Hungary) 2026 CS Budapest Trophy | 3 | 65.53 | 4 | 114.39 | 2 | 179.92 |
| Oct 27–1 Nov, 2026 | (Romania) 2026 Crystal Skate | 2 | 54.05 | 1 | 108.09 | 2 | 162.14 |

2023–2024 season
| Date | Event | SP | FS | Total |
|---|---|---|---|---|
| 18–24 March 2024 | 2024 World Championships | 27; 52.52 | - | 27; 52.52 |
| 10–14 January 2024 | 2024 European Championships | 10; 58.59 | 9; 109.81 | 9; 168.40 |
| 21–24 November 2023 | 2023 Tallinn Trophy | 4; 59.50 | 4; 107.88 | 4; 167.38 |
| 27–29 October 2023 | 2023 Tirnavia Ice Cup | 1; 64.18 | 2; 111.56 | 1; 175.74 |
| 28–30 September 2023 | 2023 CS Nepela Memorial | 6; 55.55 | 6; 108.09 | 6; 163.64 |
2022–2023 season
| Date | Event | SP | FS | Total |
| 22–26 March 2023 | 2023 World Championships | 22; 56.02 | 20; 109.60 | 20; 165.62 |
| 22–26 February 2023 | 2023 Bellu Memorial | 1; 64.28 | 1; 107.60 | 1; 171.88 |
| 9–12 February 2023 | 2023 Dragon Trophy | 2; 59.13 | 2; 108.45 | 2; 167.58 |
| 25–29 January 2023 | 2023 European Championships | 11; 56.58 | 12; 103.84 | 10; 160.42 |
| 11–15 January 2023 | 2023 EduSport Trophy | 3; 53.70 | 2; 115.04 | 2; 168.74 |
| 29 November–3 December 2022 | 2022 Bosphorus Cup | 2; 56.15 | 3; 108.94 | 2; 165.09 |
| 11–13 November 2022 | 2022 MK John Wilson Trophy | 12; 52.38 | 9; 104.08 | 10; 156.46 |
| 26–30 October 2022 | 2022 Crystal Skate of Romania | 3; 53.76 | 2; 104.33 | 2; 158.09 |
| 19–22 October 2022 | 2022 Trophée Métropole Nice Côte d'Azur | 11; 45.28 | 5; 98.25 | 8; 143.53 |
2021–2022 season
| Date | Event | SP | FS | Total |
| 21–27 March 2022 | 2022 World Championships | 19; 58.07 | 18; 112.24 | 18; 170.31 |
| 19–23 January 2022 | 2022 Skate Helena | 3; 49.05 | 3; 106.44 | 3; 155.49 |
| 11–13 January 2022 | 2022 Dragon Trophy | 3; 57.74 | 3; 102.76 | 3; 160.50 |
| 6–12 December 2021 | 2021 Santa Claus Cup | 3; 53.19 | 13; 74.84 | 9; 128.03 |
| 19–21 November 2021 | 2021 Skate Celje | 6; 40.06 | 3; 96.30 | 4; 136.36 |
| 28–29 October 2021 | 2022 Romanian Championships | 1; 53.76 | 1; 104.33 | 1; 158.09 |
| 20–24 October 2021 | 2021 Trophée Métropole Nice Côte d'Azur | 5; 50.55 | 3; 106.75 | 3; 157.30 |
| 22–25 September 2021 | 2021 CS Nebelhorn Trophy | 20; 48.79 | 21; 87.70 | 20; 136.49 |
| 10–12 September 2021 | 2021 CS Lombardia Trophy | 11; 52.08 | 12; 94.76 | 13; 146.84 |
2018–19 season
| Date | Event | SP | FS | Total |
| 18–24 March 2019 | 2019 World Championships | 29; 53.11 | – | 29; 53.11 |
| 21–27 January 2019 | 2019 European Championships | 14; 54.29 | 15; 98.86 | 14; 153.15 |
| 23–25 November 2018 | 2018 Warsaw Cup | 15; 39.15 | 3; 92.54 | 5; 131.69 |
| 11–18 November 2018 | 2018 CS Alpen Trophy | 16; 48.74 | 17; 84.26 | 14; 133.00 |
| 25–28 October 2018 | 2018 Crystal Skate of Romania | 3; 51.77 | 2; 93.59 | 2; 145.36 |
2017–18 season
| Date | Event | SP | FS | Total |
| 4–8 April 2018 | 2018 Egna Spring Trophy | 5; 47.80 | 2; 99.85 | 3; 147.65 |
| 29–30 March 2018 | 2018 Balkan Games | 1; 45.50 | 1; 95.02 | 1; 140.52 |
| 16–18 March 2018 | 2018 Coupe du Printemps | 8; 50.15 | 5; 86.21 | 5; 136.36 |
| 15–21 January 2018 | 2018 European Championships | 29; 44.57 | – | 29; 44.57 |
2016–17 season
| Date | Event | SP | FS | Total |
| 14–19 February 2017 | 2017 Bavarian Open | 12; 45.27 | 13; 82.70 | 11; 127.97 |
| 9–12 February 2017 | 2017 Dragon Trophy | 3; 46.96 | 6; 75.92 | 6; 122.88 |
| 25–29 January 2017 | 2017 European Championships | 25; 45.59 | – | 25; 45.59 |
| 6–11 December 2016 | 2016 Santa Claus Cup | 3; 43.37 | 4; 83.13 | 3; 126.55 |
| 10–13 November 2016 | 2016 Merano Cup | 10; 36.98 | 9; 73.78 | 8; 110.76 |
| 3–6 November 2016 | 2016 Crystal Skate of Romania | 1; 42.27 | 1; 84.56 | 1; 126.83 |
| 27–30 October 2016 | 2016 Golden Bear of Zagreb | 15; 45.20 | 20; 76.78 | 18; 121.98 |

=== Junior level ===
2015–16 season
| Date | Event | Level | SP | FS | Total |
|---|---|---|---|---|---|
| 14–20 March 2016 | 2016 World Junior Championships | Junior | 32; 39.67 | – | 32; 39.67 |
| 4–7 February 2016 | 2016 Dragon Trophy | Junior | 1; 45.18 | 1; 77.07 | 1; 122.25 |
| 25–31 January 2016 | 2016 European Championships | Senior | 27; 41.79 | – | 27; 41.79 |
| 6–10 January 2016 | 2016 Mentor Toruń Cup | Junior | 6; 42.54 | 11; 65.38 | 7; 107.92 |
| 4–7 November 2015 | 2015 Crystal Skate of Romania | Junior | 2; 36.34 | 1; 66.85 | 1; 103.19 |
| 14–18 October 2015 | 2015 International Cup of Nice | Senior | 13; 39.63 | 18; 52.00 | 18; 91.63 |
2014–15 season
| Date | Event | Level | SP | FS | Total |
| 2–8 March 2015 | 2015 World Junior Championships | Junior | 25; 45.00 | – | 25; 45.00 |
| 11–15 February 2015 | 2015 Bavarian Open | Senior | 13; 39.71 | 10; 77.63 | 10; 117.34 |
| 26 January–1 February 2015 | 2015 European Championships | Senior | 35; 36.70 | – | 35; 36.70 |
| 1–7 December 2014 | 2014 Santa Claus Cup | Senior | 3; 44.64 | 3; 76.60 | 3; 121.24 |
| 23–26 October 2014 | 2014 Crystal Skate of Romania | Senior | 3; 34.17 | 1; 77.29 | 1; 111.46 |
| 8–11 October 2014 | 2014 JGP Croatia | Junior | 23; 34.32 | 18; 68.41 | 21; 102.73 |
| 24–27 September 2014 | 2014 CS Nebelhorn Trophy | Senior | 15; 38.27 | 11; 73.49 | 11; 111.76 |
2013–14 season
| Date | Event | Level | SP | FS | Total |
| 10–16 March 2014 | 2014 World Junior Championships | Junior | 34; 36.87 | – | 34; 36.87 |
| 29 January–2 February 2014 | 2014 Bavarian Open | Junior | 9; 39.23 | 9; 70.59 | 9; 109.82 |
| 24–27 October 2013 | 2013 Crystal Skate of Romania | Senior | 14; 28.74 | 9; 73.52 | 12; 102.26 |
2012–13 season
| Date | Event | Level | SP | FS | Total |
| 22–24 March 2013 | 2013 Coupe du Printemps | Junior | 6; 36.68 | 4; 74.65 | 4; 111.33 |

Olympic Games
| Preceded by Ionela Cozmiuc and Marius Cozmiuc | Flagbearer for Romania (with Daniela Toth); Milano Cortina 2026 | Succeeded by |
