= Julija Lovrenčič =

Slovenian figure skater

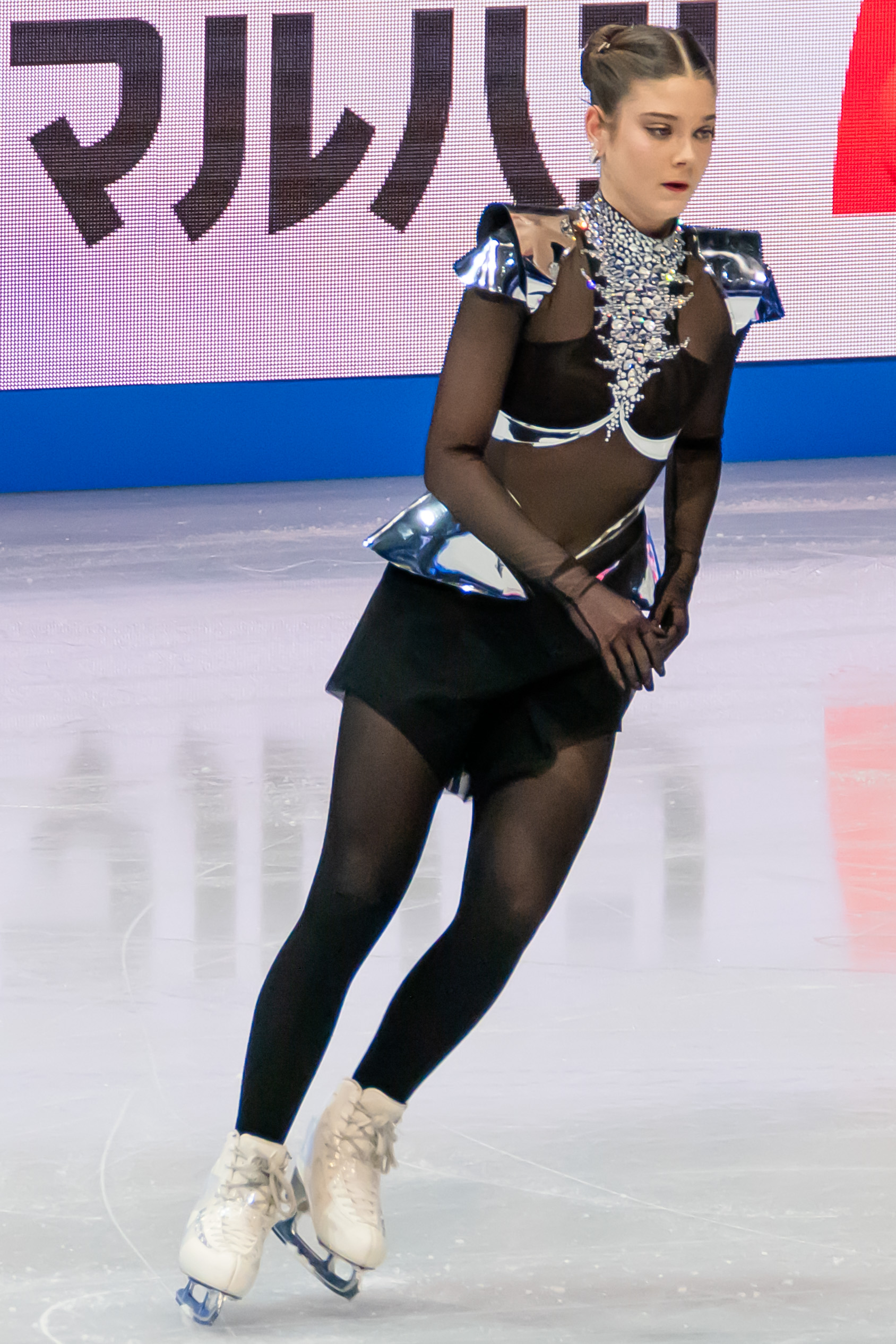
- Lovrenčič at the 2025 World Championships

Personal information
- Born: 17 May 2006 (age 20) Madrid, Spain
- Home town: Bled, Slovenia
- Height: 1.70 m (5 ft 7 in)

Figure skating career
- Country: Slovenia
- Discipline: Women's singles
- Coach: Spela Lovrenčič
- Skating club: Drsalni Klub Labod Bled
- Began skating: 2012

Medal record
Slovenian Championships
| Gold medal – first place | 2025 Celje | Singles |
| Gold medal – first place | 2024 Jesenice | Singles |

Julija Lovrenčič (born 17 May 2006) is a Slovene figure skater. She is a two-time Slovene national champion (2024, 2025), the 2026 Golden Bear champion and a Skate Celje gold medalist. She has represented Slovenia at the World and European championships (2024–2026).

== Personal life ==
Lovrenčič was born on May 17, 2006 in Madrid, Spain. She began skating at six years of age. She is coached by her sister, Spela Lovrenčič.

== Career ==
=== Early career ===
On the advanced novice level, she is a three-time Slovenian national champion (2017–19). She transitioned to the junior level in 2020 placing fifth at the national championships, later becoming a three-time junior champion (2021–23).

At the 2022 European Youth Olympic Winter Festival, she placed eighth. She debuted at the World Junior Championships a few months later, where she finished in thirty-first place, and she did not qualify for the free skate.

=== 2023–24 season: Senior international debut ===
Lovrenčič made her senior international debut at the CS Nebelhorn Trophy where she finished in eleventh place.

She went on to win her first national title as a senior skater. In January, she competed at her first European Championships. She placed thirtieth in the short program and did not advance to the free skate.

=== 2024–25 season: World Championships debut ===
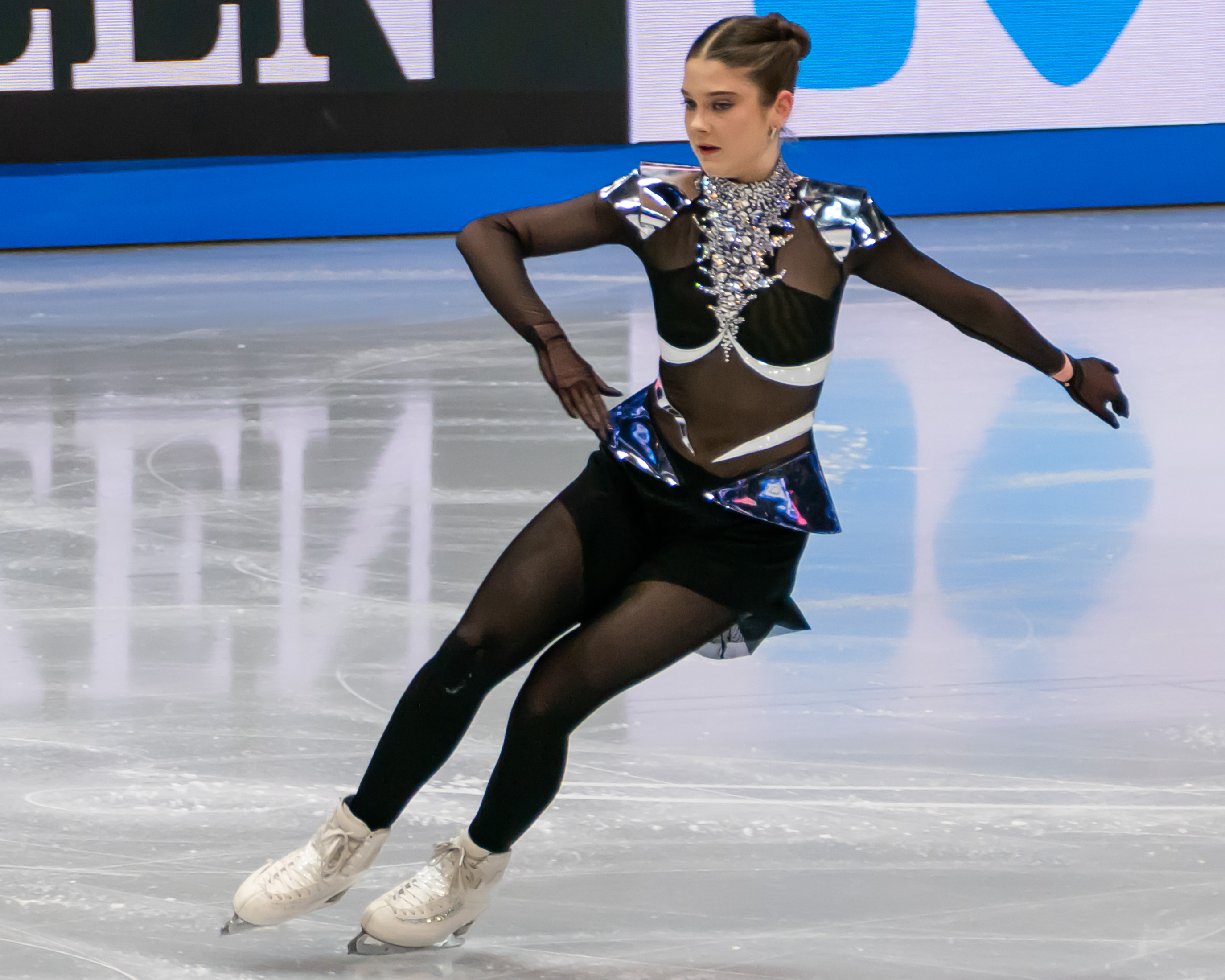
Lovrenčič performing her short program at the 2025 World Championships

Lovrenčič achieved her technical minimums required to compete at the European championships at the 2024 CS Nebelhorn Trophy, making her eligible to compete at this event.

In December 2024, she defended her national title, making this her second consecutive national title.

In January 2025, her rink closed for renovation, and she sought funding to continue training elsewhere. Later in January, Lovrenčič competed at the 2025 European Championships, finishing twentieth in the short program and fulfilling her goal of advancing to the free skate. She placed twenty-second in the free skate and concluded the event in twenty-second overall.

Just one month before the 2025 World Championships, she achieved her technical minimums for the World Championships. She earned this at the 2025 Dragon Trophy. At the 2025 World Championships, she finished in thirty-second place. She did not qualify for the free skate, and this also meant that there was no quota for a Slovenian women at the upcoming 2026 Winter Olympics.

=== 2025–26 season ===
Lovrenčič opened the Olympic season by competing at the 2025 Skate to Milano qualifying event, where the top five women had the opportunity to garner an Olympic quota for their country. She finished fourteenth in the event and did not qualify for the Olympics.

Later in the season, she competed at the 2026 Golden Bear and Skate Celje; she won both events.

At the 2026 European Championships in Sheffield, she again finished in twenty-second place. Furthermore, she finished twenty-ninth at the 2026 World Championships and did not advance to the free skate.

== Programs ==
| Season | Short program | Free skating | Exhibition |
|---|---|---|---|
| 2026–2027 | Missing; Missing (Tod Terry Club Mix) by Everything But The Girl choreo. by Marina Barova | Cry Me a River by Michael Bublé choreo. by Marina Barova | |
| 2025–2026 | Pearls (remastered); Jezebel (remastered) by Sade choreo. by Marina Barova | Spartacus Suite No. 2: I. Adagio Of Spartacus And Phrygia by Aram Khatchaturian choreo. by Marina Barova | |
| 2024–2025 | Thule by Travis Dale Lake; Selah by Kanye West choreo. by Dasa Grm | Palmeras En La Nieve by Adam Alboran | |

== Competitive highlights ==
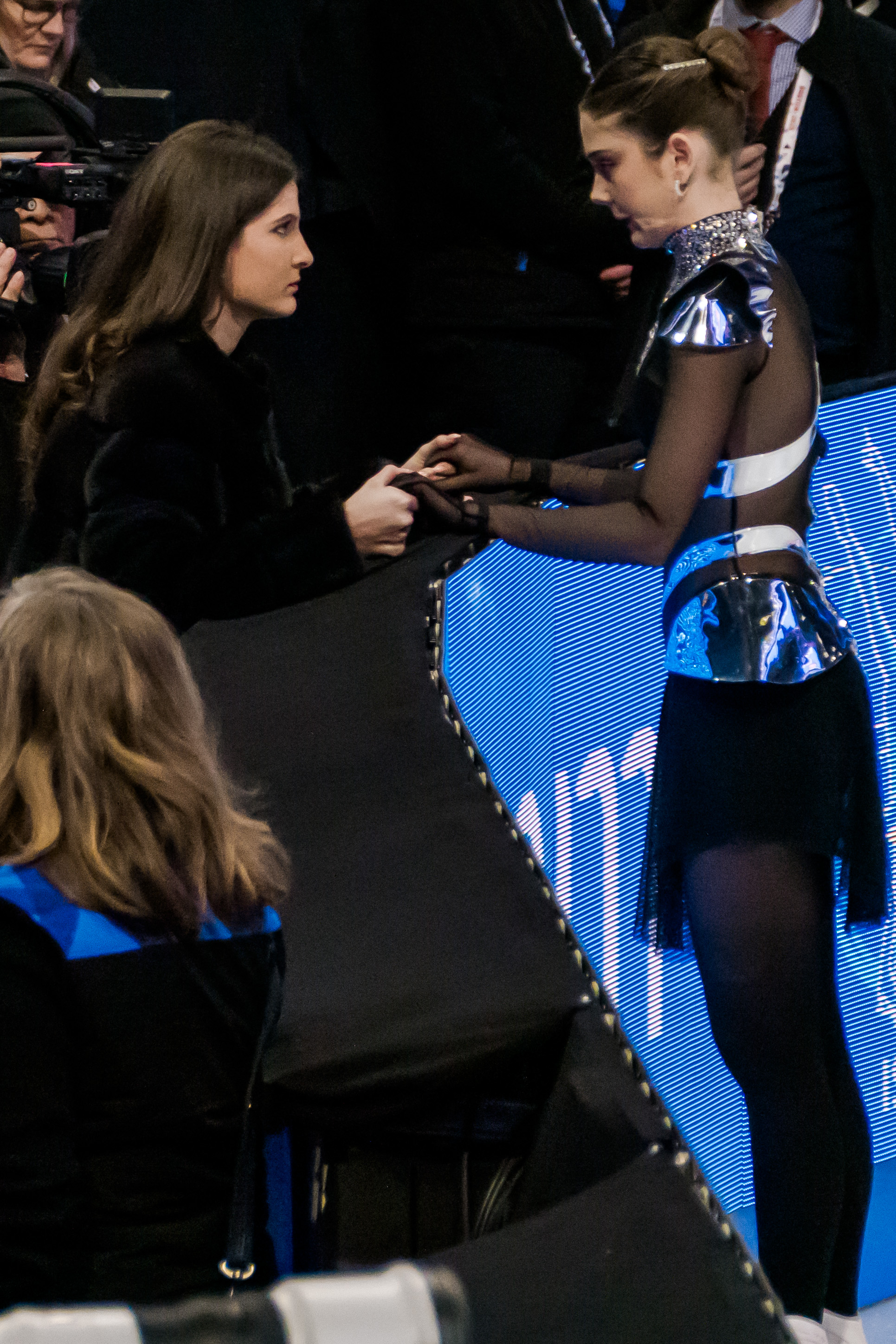
Lovrenčič before her short program at the 2025 World Championships

- CS – Event of the ISU Challenger Series
- JGP – Event of the ISU Junior Grand Prix
- TBD – Assigned
- WD – Withdrew from competition

Competition placements at senior level
| Season | 2022–23 | 2023–24 | 2024–25 | 2025–26 | 2026–27 |
|---|---|---|---|---|---|
| World Championships | | | 32nd | 29th | |
| European Championships | | 30th | 22nd | 22nd | |
| Slovenian Championships | | 1st | 1st | | |
| CS Golden Spin of Zagreb | | | 17th | | |
| CS Nepela Memorial | | | | | 18th |
| Triglav Trophy | 5th | 3rd | 5th | | |
| Nebelhorn Trophy | | 11th | 11th | | |
| Tirnavia Ice Cup | | 6th | | | |
| Skate Celje | | 3rd | 11th | 1st | |
| Sofia Trophy | | 1st | 6th | | |
| Dragon Trophy | | 9th | 3rd | | |
| Tanja's Memorial | | 1st | | | |
| Pokal Slovenije | | 1st | | | |
| Tayside Trophy | | | 6th | | |
| Ice Challenge | | | 2nd | | |
| Santa Claus Cup | | | 8th | | |
| Lombardia Trophy | | | | 14th | |
| Skate to Milano Beijing | | | | 14th | |
| Golden Bear | | | | 1st | |
| Bosphorus Cup | | | | 3rd | |
| Skate Berlin International | | | | 12th | |

Competition placements at junior level
| Season | 2019–20 | 2020–21 | 2021–22 | 2022–23 | 2023–24 | 2024–25 |
|---|---|---|---|---|---|---|
| World Junior Championships | | | 31st | | | 36th |
| Slovenian Championships | 5th | | 1st | 1st | 1st | |
| European Youth Olympic Winter Festival | | | 8th | | | |
| JGP Slovenia | | | 16th | | | 12th |
| JGP Austria | | | 18th | | | |
| JGP Poland | | | | 27th | | |
| JGP Austria | | | | 25th | | |
| JGP Armenia | | | | | 16th | |
| JGP Latvia | | | | | | 12th |
| Sofia Trophy | | 5th | | | | |
| Egna Spring Trophy | | 17th | | | | |
| Gorenjski Trojni Axel | | | 1st | | | |
| Zaki's Flip | | | 1st | | | |
| Santa Claus Cup | | | 16th | 8th | | |
| Biellman Cup | | | 2nd | | | |
| Skate Helena | | | 1st | | | |
| Dragon Trophy | | | 5th | 18th | | |
| Pokal Slovenije | | | 1st | | | |
| Skate Celje | | | | 5th | | |
