= Figure skating at the 2015 Winter Universiade – Ladies' singles =

The ladies' singles competition of the figure skating at the 2015 Winter Universiade was held at the Universiade Igloo in Granada. The short program was held on February 7 and the free skating was held on February 8.

== Results ==
=== Short program ===
Pl.	Name	Nation	TSS	TES	PCS	SS	TR	PE	CH	IN	Ded	StN
1	Alena Leonova	Russia	67.12	34.20	32.92	8.15	7.80	8.30	8.45	8.45	0.00	20
2	Maria Artemieva	Russia	62.11	33.95	28.16	7.10	6.85	7.15	7.05	7.05	0.00	27
3	Roberta Rodeghiero	Italy	58.03	31.79	26.24	6.60	6.35	6.60	6.65	6.60	0.00	8
4	Maé-Bérénice Méité	France	56.84	30.20	26.64	6.75	6.35	6.65	6.65	6.90	0.00	26
5	Laurine Lecavelier	France	55.29	28.89	26.40	6.65	6.30	6.65	6.70	6.70	0.00	25
6	Yuki Nishino	Japan	54.11	28.11	27.00	7.00	6.45	6.60	6.80	6.90	-1.00	9
7	Miyabi Oba	Japan	49.71	27.23	22.48	5.90	5.40	5.55	5.55	5.70	0.00	15
8	Sonia Lafuente	Spain	49.47	25.83	23.64	6.15	5.55	6.00	5.95	5.90	0.00	1
9	Zhao Ziquan	China	47.64	24.96	23.68	6.05	5.70	5.85	6.00	6.00	-1.00	2
10	Kerstin Frank	Austria	47.44	25.36	22.08	5.80	5.20	5.55	5.55	5.50	0.00	6
11	Anna Khnychenkova	Ukraine	45.90	25.94	21.96	5.80	5.20	5.40	5.55	5.50	-2.00	21
12	Anne Line Gjersem	Norway	44.56	24.28	20.28	5.10	4.75	5.15	5.15	5.20	0.00	12
13	Sera Väistö	Finland	44.24	23.52	20.72	5.30	4.95	5.20	5.20	5.25	0.00	17
14	Beata Papp	Finland	40.68	18.48	22.20	5.50	5.25	5.60	5.55	5.85	0.00	3
15	Reyna Hamui	Mexico	40.67	20.23	20.44	5.00	4.90	5.15	5.10	5.40	0.00	7
16	Nathalie Weinzierl	Germany	40.52	18.00	23.52	6.20	5.60	5.60	6.05	5.95	-1.00	13
17	Daša Grm	Slovenia	40.39	20.15	21.24	5.65	5.05	5.15	5.40	5.30	-1.00	24
18	Alexandra Kunová	Slovakia	39.29	19.49	19.80	5.05	4.65	4.85	5.15	5.05	0.00	19
19	Carol Bressanutti	Italy	38.66	17.34	21.32	5.15	5.05	5.40	5.55	5.50	0.00	4
20	Lejeanne Marais	South Africa	37.29	18.77	19.52	4.85	4.60	5.00	4.90	5.05	-1.00	31
21	Alexandra Rout	New Zealand	36.68	17.36	19.32	4.95	4.60	4.65	4.90	5.05	0.00	32
22	Birce Atabey	Turkey	36.38	19.50	17.88	4.60	4.30	4.40	4.60	4.45	-1.00	23
23	Linnea Mellgren	Sweden	36.35	17.47	20.88	5.40	5.05	5.00	5.40	5.25	-2.00	10
24	Inga Janulevičiūtė	Lithuania	35.30	18.62	17.68	4.60	4.30	4.40	4.45	4.35	-1.00	11
Did not advance to free skating
25	Kristina Zakharanka	Belarus	34.24	15.04	19.20	4.90	4.55	4.80	4.95	4.80	0.00	18
26	Sarah Hecken	Germany	33.34	12.82	20.52	5.35	4.95	5.00	5.25	5.10	0.00	16
27	Anita Kapferer	Austria	32.78	13.78	20.00	5.30	4.80	4.90	5.10	4.90	-1.00	28
28	Anastasia Yalovaia	Ukraine	32.56	13.32	19.24	4.90	4.65	4.80	4.80	4.90	0.00	14
29	Jaimee Nobbs	Australia	31.26	14.54	17.72	4.55	4.30	4.35	4.55	4.40	-1.00	29
30	Pina Umek	Slovenia	30.62	12.10	18.52	4.85	4.30	4.55	4.85	4.60	0.00	22
31	Mary Ro Reyes	Mexico	25.98	8.54	17.44	4.40	4.20	4.20	4.50	4.50	0.00	5
32	Sinem Kuyucu	Turkey	24.02	10.06	15.96	4.05	3.90	3.90	4.10	4.00	-2.00	30

=== Free skating ===
Pl.	Name	Nation	TSS	TES	PCS	SS	TR	PE	CH	IN	Ded	StN
1	Alena Leonova	Russia	115.73	53.69	63.04	8.00	7.60	7.85	7.90	8.05	-1.00	21
2	Maé Bérénice Méité	France	114.70	57.90	56.80	7.20	6.75	7.15	7.05	7.35	0.00	20
3	Maria Artemieva	Russia	108.13	51.37	57.76	7.25	6.85	7.35	7.15	7.50	-1.00	19
4	Anna Khnychenkova	Ukraine	99.97	52.01	48.96	6.40	6.00	6.10	6.15	5.95	-1.00	16
5	Laurine Lecavelier	France	99.95	45.83	55.12	7.05	6.65	6.90	6.90	6.95	-1.00	22
6	Miyabi Oba	Japan	97.53	43.61	53.92	6.40	5.95	6.20	6.30	6.15	0.00	14
7	Yuki Nishino	Japan	97.53	43.61	53.92	6.90	6.45	6.80	6.75	6.80	0.00	24
8	Sonia Lafuente	Spain	97.34	49.30	49.04	6.30	5.85	6.35	6.15	6.00	-1.00	15
9	Anne Line Gjersem	Norway	95.25	48.61	46.64	5.85	5.60	5.95	5.85	5.90	0.00	13
10	Kerstin Frank	Austria	94.28	46.52	47.76	6.35	5.50	6.15	5.80	6.05	0.00	17
11	Roberta Rodeghiero	Italy	93.82	40.14	53.68	6.75	6.55	6.70	6.70	6.85	0.00	23
12	Zhao Ziquan	China	92.25	44.85	48.40	6.55	5.80	5.95	6.05	5.90	-1.00	18
13	Daša Grm	Slovenia	83.31	39.63	43.68	5.60	5.20	5.45	5.55	5.50	0.00	9
14	Sera Väistö	Finland	77.95	35.83	43.12	5.50	5.20	5.35	5.40	5.50	-1.00	12
15	Linnea Mellgren	Sweden	75.84	36.64	41.20	5.40	4.95	5.20	5.25	4.95	-2.00	4
16	Inga Janulevičiūtė	Lithuania	74.98	36.38	39.60	4.95	4.75	5.00	4.95	5.10	-1.00	3
17	Reyna Hamui	Mexico	73.11	32.91	41.20	5.25	5.00	5.15	5.05	5.30	-1.00	7
18	Alexandra Kunová	Slovakia	70.84	30.76	40.08	5.20	5.00	4.90	5.05	4.90	0.00	10
19	Birce Atabey	Turkey	70.34	34.74	35.60	4.50	4.55	4.30	4.45	4.45	0.00	5
20	Beata Papp	Finland	69.64	29.28	41.36	5.40	4.80	5.25	5.15	5.25	-1.00	8
21	Carol Bressanutti	Italy	66.87	24.39	42.48	5.20	5.15	5.30	5.40	5.50	0.00	11
22	Lejeanne Marais	South Africa	63.47	27.95	37.52	4.90	4.35	4.65	4.75	4.80	-2.00	2
23	Alexandra Rout	New Zealand	61.96	25.00	36.96	4.90	4.45	4.55	4.70	4.50	0.00	6
24	Kristina Zakhranka	Belarus	56.94	22.94	36.00	4.70	4.15	4.45	4.55	4.65	-2.00	1

=== Overall ===
Rank	Name	Nation	TP	SP		FS	
1st place, gold medalist(s)	Alena Leonova	Russia	182.85	1	67.12	1	115.73
2nd place, silver medalist(s)	Maé-Bérénice Méité	France	171.54	4	56.84	2	114.70
3rd place, bronze medalist(s)	Maria Artemieva	Russia	170.24	2	62.11	3	108.13
4	Laurine Lecavelier	France	155.24	5	55.29	5	99.95
5	Roberta Rodeghiero	Italy	151.85	3	58.03	11	93.82
6	Yuki Nishino	Japan	151.64	6	54.11	7	97.53
7	Miyabi Oba	Japan	148.69	7	49.71	6	98.98
8	Sonia Lafuente	Spain	146.81	8	49.47	8	97.34
9	Anna Khnychenkova	Ukraine	145.87	11	45.90	4	99.97
10	Kerstin Frank	Austria	141.72	10	47.44	10	94.28
11	Zhao Ziquan	China	139.89	9	47.64	12	92.25
12	Anne Line Gjersem	Norway	139.81	12	44.56	9	95.25
13	Daša Grm	Slovenia	123.70	17	40.39	13	83.31
14	Sera Väistö	Finland	122.19	13	44.24	14	77.95
15	Reyna Hamui	Mexico	113.78	15	40.67	17	73.11
16	Linnea Mellgren	Sweden	112.19	23	36.35	15	75.84
17	Beata Papp	Finland	110.32	14	40.68	20	69.64
18	Inga Janulevičiūtė	Lithuania	110.28	24	35.3	16	74.98
19	Alexandra Kunová	Slovakia	110.13	18	39.29	18	70.84
20	Birce Atabey	Turkey	106.72	22	36.38	19	70.34
21	Carol Bressanutti	Italy	105.53	19	38.66	21	66.87
22	Lejeanne Marais	South Africa	100.76	20	37.29	22	63.47
23	Alexandra Rout	New Zealand	98.64	21	36.68	23	61.96
24	Kristina Zakhranka	Belarus	91.18	25	34.24	24	56.94
Did not advance to free skating
25	Sarah Hecken	Germany		25	33.34	—	
26	Anita Kapferer	Austria		27	32.78	—	
27	Anastasia Yalovaia	Ukraine		28	32.56	—	
28	Jaimee Nobbs	Australia		29	31.26	—	
29	Pina Umek	Slovenia		30	30.62	—	
30	Mary Ro Reyes	Mexico		31	25.98	—	
31	Sinem Kuyucu	Turkey		32	24.02	—	
WD	Nathalie Weinzierl	Germany		16	40.52	—	
