= Dragon Trophy =

International figure skating competition

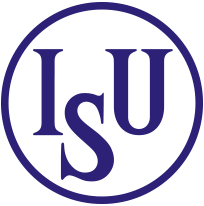
- Location: Slovenia

The Dragon Trophy is an annual international figure skating competition which is generally held in February in Ljubljana, Slovenia. Medals may be awarded in men's singles and women's singles at the senior, junior, and novice levels.

== Senior results ==
=== Men's singles ===
Year	Gold	Silver	Bronze	Ref.
2012	(Bosnia and Herzegovina) Damjan Ostojič	(Mexico) Fabriczio Carrillo	No other competitors	
2013	(Spain) Javier Raya	(Spain) Felipe Montoya	(Italy) Saverio Giacomelli	
2014	(Russia) Mikhail Kolyada	(Denmark) Justus Strid	(Russia) Artem Lezheev	
2016	(Finland) Roman Galay	(Slovenia) David Kranjec	(Italy) Alessandro Fadini	
2017	(Czech Republic) Petr Kotlařík	(Italy) Alessandro Fadini	(Turkey) Mehmet Çakır	
2018	(Switzerland) Nurullah Sahaka	(Italy) Alessandro Fadini	(Hungary) Alexander Borovoj	
2019	(Russia) Alexander Petrov	(Russia) Andrei Lazukin	(Turkey) Burak Demirboğa	
2020	(Switzerland) Nicola Todeschini	(Monaco) Davide Lewton Brain	(Switzerland) Nurullah Sahaka	
2022	(Monaco) Davide Lewton Brain	(France) Corentin Spinar	(Slovakia) Michael Neuman	
2023	(Austria) Luc Maierhofer	(Monaco) Davide Lewton Brain	(Croatia) Jari Kessler	
2024	(Hungary) Aleksandr Vlasenko	(France) Corentin Spinar	(Slovenia) David Sedej	
2025	(Croatia) Jari Kessler	(Slovenia) David Sedej	No other competitors	

=== Women's singles ===
Year	Gold	Silver	Bronze	Ref.
2012	(Slovenia) Daša Grm	(Austria) Sabrina Schulz	(Slovenia) Nika Cerič	
2013	(Spain) Sonia Lafuente	(Slovenia) Daša Grm	(Germany) Minami Hanashiro	
2014	(Russia) Valentina Chernishova	(Denmark) Anita Madsen	(Slovenia) Daša Grm	
2016	(Slovenia) Daša Grm	(Italy) Ilaria Nogaro	(Austria) Lara Roth	
2017	(Sweden) Isabelle Olsson	(Italy) Guia Maria Tagliapietra	(Austria) Lara Roth	
2018	(Germany) Nathalie Weinzierl	(Finland) Viveca Lindfors	(Italy) Anna Memola	
2019	(Russia) Elizaveta Tuktamysheva	(Russia) Anastasiia Guliakova	(Italy) Marina Piredda	
2020	(Italy) Roberta Rodeghiero	(Italy) Lara Naki Gutmann	(Slovenia) Daša Grm	
2022	(Slovenia) Daša Grm	(Switzerland) Yasmine Kimiko Yamada	(Romania) Julia Sauter	
2023	(Italy) Lara Naki Gutmann	(Romania) Julia Sauter	(Austria) Stefanie Pesendorfer	
2024	(Austria) Olga Mikutina	(Italy) Lara Naki Gutmann	(Slovakia) Vanesa Šelmeková	
2025	(Italy) Marina Piredda	(Italy) Ginevra Lavinia Negrello	(Slovenia) Julija Lovrencic	

== Junior results ==
=== Men's singles ===
Year	Gold	Silver	Bronze	Ref.
2004	(Slovenia) Damjan Ostojič	(Slovenia) Luka Čadež	(United Kingdom) Alex Wilde	
2005	(Slovenia) Luka Čadež	(Australia) Robert McNamara	(Austria) Severin Kiefer	
2006	(Slovenia) Luka Čadež	(Italy) Marco Fabbri	(Germany) Peter Liebers	
2007	(Kazakhstan) Denis Ten	(United Kingdom) Jason Thompson	(Croatia) Ivor Mikolčević	
2008	(Austria) Severin Kiefer	(Croatia) Ivor Mikolčević	No other competitors	
2009	(Austria) Mario-Rafael Ionian	(Austria) Severin Kiefer	No other competitors	
2010	(Croatia) Ivor Mikolčević	(Bosnia and Herzegovina) Amel Bureković	No other competitors	
2011	(France) Romain Ponsart	(Armenia) Slavik Hayrapetyan	(United Kingdom) Peter James Hallam	
2012	(Slovenia) Kristof Brezar	No other competitors		
2013	(Italy) Carlo Vittorio Palermo	(Bulgaria) Ivo Gatovski	(Slovenia) Kristof Brezar	
2014	(Italy) Adrien Bannister	(Bulgaria) Ivo Gatovski	(Hungary) Alexander Borovoj	
2016	(Austria) Luc Maierhofer	(Italy) Giorgio Vianello	(Hungary) Andras Csernoch	
2017	(France) Julian Donica	(Italy) Nik Folini	(Hungary) Alexander Maszljanko	
2018	(Sweden) Gabriel Folkesson	(Turkey) Başar Oktar	(United Kingdom) Josh Brown	
2019	(Russia) Gleb Lutfullin	(Turkey) Ömer Efe Sayici	(Poland) Kornel Witkowski	
2020	(Italy) Emanuele Indelicato	(Slovakia) Adam Hagara	(Slovenia) David Sedej	
2022	(Russia) Maskim Avtushenko	(Israel) Nikita Kovalenko	(Slovenia) David Sedej	
2023	(Hungary) Aleksei Vlasenko	(Italy) Tommaso Barison	No other competitors	
2024	(Slovakia) Lucas Vaclavik	(Slovenia) David Sedej	(United Kingdom) Arin Yorke	
2025	(Slovakia) Lucas Vaclavik	(Czech Republic) Tadeas Vaclavik	(Austria) Maksym Petrychenko	

=== Women's singles ===
Year	Gold	Silver	Bronze	Ref.
2004	(Luxembourg) Fleur Maxwell	(Slovenia) Teodora Poštič	(Slovenia) Darja Škrlj	
2005	(Croatia) Željka Krizmanić	(Slovenia) Daša Grm	(Australia) Phoebe Di Tommaso	
2006	(Finland) Anna Heinonen	(Italy) Nicole Della Monica	(Slovenia) Ana Stublar	
2007	(Austria) Denise Koegl	(Austria) Kerstin Sommergruber	(Austria) Delphine Kristofics-Binder	
2008	(Croatia) Mirna Librić	(Slovenia) Anastasija Uspenska	(Finland) Petra Arponen	
2009	(Slovenia) Nika Cerič	(Slovenia) Daša Grm	(Finland) Sofia Ahanen	
2010	(Italy) Amelia Schweinbacher	(Slovenia) Nika Cerič	(Austria) Sabrina Schulz	
2011	(Austria) Victoria Hübler	(Italy) Carol Bressanutti	(Austria) Sabrina Schulz	
2012	(Slovenia) Patricia Gleščič	(Finland) Saara Astola	(Finland) Justiina Niemi	
2013	(Italy) Caterina Andermarcher	(Italy) Silvia Martinelli	(Serbia) Sandra Ristivojević	
2014	(Finland) Viveca Lindfors	(Austria) Lara Roth	(Finland) Emmi Peltonen	
2016	(Romania) Julia Sauter	(Slovenia) Monika Peterka	(Finland) Emma Niemi	
2017	(Sweden) Emma Kivioja	(Slovakia) Alexandra Hagarová	(Italy) Giulia Foresti	
2018	(Italy) Marina Piredda	(Austria) Stefanie Pesendorfer	(Italy) Lara Naki Gutmann	
2019	(Russia) Alina Solovyeva	(France) Lorine Schild	(France) Léa Serna	
2020	(Lithuania) Jogailė Aglinskytė	(Switzerland) Anaïs Coraducci	(Italy) Carlotta Maria Gardini	
2022	(Belgium) Nina Pinzarrone	(France) Lorine Schild	(France) Lola Ghozali	
2023	(Georgia (country)) Inga Gurgenidze	(Italy) Chiara Minighini	(Hungary) Lena Ekker	
2024	(Slovakia) Olívia Lengyelová	(Italy) Chiara Minighini	(Switzerland) Chiara Schöll	
2025	(Italy) Chiara Minighini	(Germany) Kira Thurner	(Germany) Valentina Andrianova	
