= Yuka Kono =

Japanese figure skater

Japanese name
- Kanji: 河野 有香
- Kana: こうの ゆか

Yuka Kono
Personal information
- Other names: Yuka Kouno
- Born: August 23, 1992 (age 34) Hiroshima, Japan
- Height: 1.65 m (5 ft 5 in)

Figure skating career
- Country: Japan
- Coach: Yuka Monna
- Skating club: Hiroshima SC, Kurashiki Suisho High School

Yuka Kono (河野 有香, Kōno Yuka) (born August 23, 1992) is a Japanese former figure skater. She won the silver medal at the 2010 Merano Cup.

== Programs ==
Season	Short program	Free skating
2011–12	Brown and Blue by Ryōta Komatsu	Miss Saigon by Claude-Michel Schönberg

== Competitive highlights ==
International
Event	04–05	05–06	06–07	07–08	08–09	09–10	10–11	11–12	12–13	13–14	14–15
Finlandia Trophy								8th			
Merano Cup							2nd				
National
Japan Champ.							16th	14th	30th		22nd
Japan Jr. Champ.				28th		13th					
West Japan Sect.			15th J	7th J	9th J	6th J	3rd				
Chushikoku/Kyushu	12th N	6th N	2nd J	6th J	2nd J	3rd J	1st				
Levels: N = Novice-A; J = Junior											
