= Gregor Urbas =

Slovenian figure skater

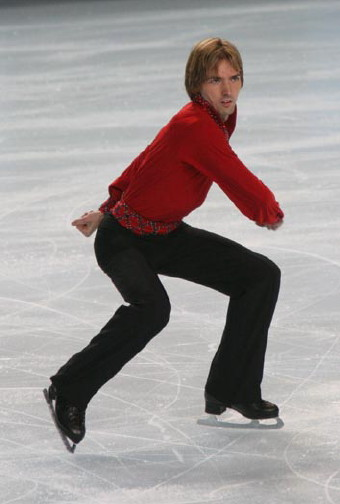
- Urbas in 2008

Personal information
- Born: 20 November 1982 (age 43) Jesenice, SR Slovenia
- Home town: Ljubljana
- Height: 1.77 m (5 ft 10 in)

Figure skating career
- Country: Slovenia
- Skating club: DKK Stanko Bloudek
- Retired: 2010

Gregor Urbas (born 20 November 1982 in Jesenice) is a Slovenian former competitive figure skater. He is a three-time Golden Spin of Zagreb champion, a five-time Triglav Trophy champion, the 2006 Ondrej Nepela Memorial champion, and a nine-time (2001–2009) Slovenian national champion. He competed at the 2006 and 2010 Winter Olympics. He qualified for the free skate at nineteen ISU Championships – six Worlds, eight Europeans, and five Junior Worlds.

== Career ==
Urbas began skating when he was about eight years old. His first coach was Mojca Kurbos. During his career, he practiced mainly in Slovenia and occasionally traveled to Philadelphia to train under Uschi Keszler.

Urbas won his first senior national title in 2001. That year, he competed at his first senior-level European Championships and finished 27th in the short program. Then at the 2001 Junior World Championships, he qualified for the free skate and finished 13th. He also competed at his first senior-level World Championships and qualified the last spot for the short program, where he finished 30th.

Urbas received a berth to the 2001–02 JGP Final as a representative of the host country despite finishing 14th in the Junior Grand Prix standings. He finished in eighth place out of the nine competitors. At the 2002 European Championships, he qualified for the free skate for the first time and finished 19th. He then finished sixth at the 2002 Junior World Championships. He did not advance to the free skate at the senior-level World Championships, finishing 28th.

Urbas finished 17th at the 2006 European Championships. He represented Slovenia at the 2006 Winter Olympics and finished 29th in the short program, failing to advance to the free skate. Then at the 2006 World Championships, he qualified for the free skate and finished 22nd.

At the 2007 European Championships, Urbas finished ninth. He finished 21st at the 2009 World Championships and earned a berth for the 2010 Winter Olympics. At the 2010 European Championships, he qualified for the free skate and finished 18th. He then represented Slovenia at the 2010 Winter Olympics and finished 27th in the short program.

== Programs ==
Season	Short program	Free skating
2009–10	Carmina Burana by Carl Orff	Armageddon by Trevor Rabin
2008–09	Ghost of Love (soundtrack)	Tristan & Iseult by Maxime Rodriguez
2007–08	Rhapsody on a Theme of Paganini by Sergei Rachmaninoff	Tristan & Iseult by Maxime Rodriguez
2005–07	Rhapsody on a Theme of Paganini by Sergei Rachmaninoff	The Mask of Zorro by James Horner
2004–05	The Phantom of the Opera by Andrew Lloyd Webber	Soundtrack by Ennio Morricone; Tarzan (soundtrack)
2003–04	Carmina Burana by Carl Orff	Tango Fantasy
2002–03	Carmina Burana by Carl Orff	Two Guitars
2001–02	Robin Hood: Prince of Thieves by Michael Kamen	Two Guitars
2000–01	Riverdance by Bill Whelan	Fiddler on the Roof by Jerry Bock

== Results ==
GP: Grand Prix; JGP: Junior Grand Prix

International
Event	97–98	98–99	99–00	00–01	01–02	02–03	03–04	04–05	05–06	06–07	07–08	08–09	09–10
Olympics									29th				27th
Worlds				30th	28th	24th	20th	19th Q	22nd	22nd	17th	21st	
Europeans				27th	19th	18th	14th	27th	17th	9th	11th	21st	18th
GP Bompard							9th	10th				9th	
GP Cup of Russia										11th	12th		
Bofrost Cup							5th						
Finlandia Trophy								5th			8th		
Golden Spin		9th	7th	15th	12th	6th			1st	1st	1st		5th
Merano Cup													13th
Nebelhorn Trophy				6th	13th	13th	10th						18th
Nepela Memorial	3rd								5th	1st	3rd	11th	12th
Schäfer Memorial							6th		2nd	5th		12th	
Slovenian Trophy		2nd	1st	1st	1st	1st	1st	1st					
Triglav Trophy						1st	1st	1st	1st	1st		2nd	
Universiade										6th			
International: Junior
Junior Worlds	23rd	17th	23rd	13th	6th								
JGP Final					8th								
JGP Canada			8th										
JGP Czech Rep.					5th								
JGP Bulgaria					4th								
JGP France		10th											
JGP Germany	23rd	13th											
JGP Hungary	13th												
JGP Norway				4th									
JGP Slovenia			5th										
JGP Ukraine				4th									
Triglav Trophy	10th J	2nd J	2nd J	1st J	2nd J								
Slovenia Trophy	1st J.												
National
Slovenian Champ.	1st J	2nd	2nd	1st	1st	1st	1st	1st	1st	1st	1st	1st	1st
