= Jan Čejvan =

Slovenian figure skater (born 1976)

Personal information
- Born: 14 June 1976 (age 50) Ljubljana, SR Slovenia, Yugoslavia
- Height: 1.76 m (5 ft 9 1/2 in)

Figure skating career
- Country: Slovenia
- Skating club: DKK Stanko Bloudek
- Began skating: 1980
- Retired: 2003

Jan Čejvan (born 14 June 1976) is a Slovene former competitive figure skater. He is the 1993–2000 national champion and competed in the final segment at three ISU Championships – the 1995 World Junior Championships in Budapest, Hungary; the 1996 European Championships in Sofia, Bulgaria; and the 1999 European Championships in Prague, Czech Republic. He has worked as an ISU technical specialist for Slovenia and the coach of Daša Grm.

== Programs ==
Season	Short program	Free skating
1999–2000	Standing in Motion; Live at the Acropolis by Yanni	The Ghost and the Darkness by Jerry Goldsmith; Independence Day by David Arnold

== Results ==
GP: Grand Prix

International
Event	91–92	92–93	93–94	94–95	95–96	96–97	97–98	98–99	99–00	00–01	01–02	02–03
Worlds		35th		17th P	36th			37th	39th			
Europeans			29th	13th P	24th	27th	28th	22nd	27th			
GP Lalique									8th			
Golden Spin									9th	23rd		16th
Karl Schäfer							17th					15th
Ondrej Nepela									14th			
Triglav Trophy												4th
Universiade												14th
International: Junior
Junior Worlds			18th P	19th								
National
Slovenia	2nd	1st	1st	1st	1st	1st	1st	1st	1st	2nd	2nd	2nd
P = Preliminary round
