= Alessandro Fadini =

Italian figure skater

Personal information
- Born: 4 May 1998 (age 28) Verona, Italy
- Height: 1.78 m (5 ft 10 in)

Figure skating career
- Country: Italy
- Coach: Silvia Martini
- Skating club: Young Goose Academy
- Began skating: 2007

Alessandro Fadini (born 4 May 1998) is an Italian figure skater. He has won a total of seven senior international medals, including medals at the Dragon Trophy (2017, 2018 silver; 2016 bronze), Egna Spring Trophy (2017, 2021 silver), Triglav Trophy (2018 silver), and Skate Celje (2021 silver).

== Programs ==
Season	Short program	Free skating
2015–16	Grande amore by Il Volo	Lay Me Down by Sam Smith

== Competitive highlights ==
CS: Challenger Series; JGP: Junior Grand Prix

International
Event	12–13	13–14	14–15	15–16	16–17	17–18	18–19	19–20	20–21	21–22
CS Golden Spin							15th	19th		24th
CS Ice Challenge				14th						
CS Lombardia					12th					
CS Tallinn Trophy							11th			
Cup of Nice					19th	16th				
Cup of Tyrol						12th				
Denkova-Staviski			5th							
Dragon Trophy				3rd	2nd	2nd	8th			
Egna Trophy					2nd				2nd	
Golden Bear				8th						
Ice Challenge				14th						
Merano Cup					5th	6th				
Métropole Nice										17th
Printemps							7th			
Santa Claus Cup				5th	5th					
Skate Celje										2nd
Tallinn Trophy								6th		
Triglav Trophy			WD			2nd				
International: Junior
JGP Slovakia				12th						
Crystal Skate			3rd							
Golden Bear			1st							
Hellmut Seibt		9th								
Lombardia	5th									
Merano Cup			3rd							
Printemps		9th	6th							
National
Italy	6th J	4th J	2nd J	4th	8th	6th	4th	4th	4th	5th
