= Boris Martinec =

Croatian figure skater

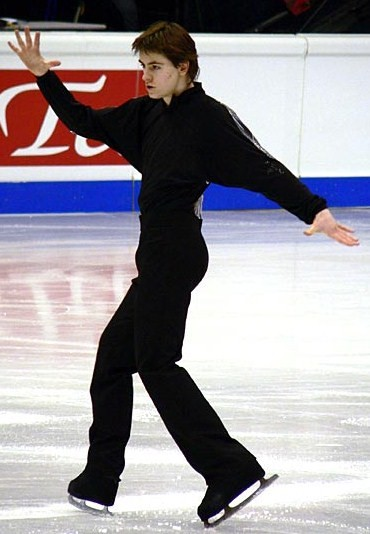
- Martinec in 2006

Personal information
- Born: 27 November 1988 (age 37) Zagreb
- Height: 1.76 m (5 ft 9 in)

Figure skating career
- Country: Croatia
- Coach: Oksana Gorbachev, Tamara Glad, Karlo Požgajčić, Rudolf Palider, Svetlana Majkova, Aleksander Rozin
- Skating club: KK Mondo, Zagreb

Boris Martinec (born 27 November 1988, in Zagreb) is a Croatian former competitive figure skater. He is the 2006 Merano Cup bronze medalist and a seven-time (2004, 2005, 2007–11) Croatian national champion. He qualified to the free skate at the 2007 European Championships in Warsaw and 2009 European Championships in Helsinki.

== Programs ==
Season	Short program	Free skating
2009–10	Grease by Jim Jacobs, Warren Casey	The Blues Brothers
2008–09	Grease by Jim Jacobs, Warren Casey	Variations on The Pink Panther Theme by Henry Mancini
2007–08	The Godfather by Nino Rota performed by Guns N' Roses	Variations on The Pink Panther Theme by Henry Mancini
2006–07	The Godfather by Nino Rota performed by Guns N' Roses	The Unforgiven by Apocalyptica performed by Metallica
2005–06	Path by Apocalyptica	The Matrix Reloaded by Don Davis; The Lord of the Rings by Howard Shore
2003–05	Soul and Drums by Harper	The Matrix Reloaded by Don Davis; The Lord of the Rings by Howard Shore

== Competitive highlights ==
International
Event	01–02	02–03	03–04	04–05	05–06	06–07	07–08	08–09	09–10	10–11
Worlds						38th	28th	41st	29th	
Europeans					33rd	22nd		23rd	26th	
Golden Spin				17th	23rd	8th		16th	11th	10th
Merano Cup						3rd				
Nebelhorn Trophy									26th	
Nepela Memorial								19th	WD	
Schäfer Memorial								9th		
Universiade								14th		WD
International: Junior
Junior Worlds				18th Q	16th Q	21st	35th			
JGP Croatia			16th		21st					
JGP Czech Rep.						18th				
JGP Slovakia					17th					
Golden Bear		5th N	10th J	1st J	3rd J		3rd J			
Grand Prize SNP		1st N	4th J							
Triglav Trophy					4th J					
Mladost Trophy			5th N							
National
Croatian Champ.	4th	3rd	1st	1st		1st	1st	1st	1st	1st
Levels: N = Novice; J = Junior; JGP = Junior Grand Prix; Q = Qualifying round
