= Teodora Poštič =

Slovenian former figure skater (born 1984)

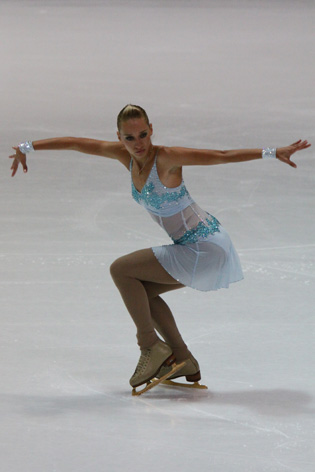
- Poštič at the 2009 Nebelhorn Trophy

Personal information
- Born: 25 September 1984 (age 42) Jesenice, Slovenia
- Height: 1.65 m (5 ft 5 in)

Figure skating career
- Country: Slovenia
- Skating club: DKK Stanko Bloudek
- Began skating: 1991
- Retired: 2010

Teodora Poštič (born 25 September 1984) is a Slovenian former figure skater. She is a five-time (2006–10) Slovenian national champion and reached the free skate at four ISU Championships – three Europeans and one Junior Worlds. By placing fifth at the 2009 Nebelhorn Trophy, she qualified a spot for Slovenia in the ladies' figure skating event at the 2010 Winter Olympics in Vancouver, where she placed 27th.

== Career ==
=== Junior ===
Poštič competed at her first Junior Grand Prix (JGP) in 1999 and finished 10th at the 1999 JGP Croatia. She placed 19th at the 2000 JGP Ukraine. She competed at her first Junior World Championships in 2002 but did not advance beyond the qualifying round. She placed 17th at the 2003 European Youth Olympic Festival. Then at the 2004 Junior World Championships, she advanced to the free skate for the first time and finished 23rd overall.

=== Senior ===
Poštič competed at her first senior European Championships in 2005, and she finished 30th in the short program and did not advance to the free skate. She won her first Slovenian national title in 2006. She then qualified for the free skate at the 2006 European Championships, finishing 20th. Then at the 2006 World Championships, she finished 30th in the short program.

Poštič did not compete at the 2007 European Championships due to an Achilles tendon injury. At the 2007 World Championships, she finished 36th in the short program. She also finished 36th in the short program at the 2008 European Championships. She did qualify for the free skate at the 2009 European Championships and finished 18th. Then at the 2009 World Championships, she finished 35th in the short program.

Poštič finished fifth at the 2009 Nebelhorn Trophy and as a result earned a berth for the 2010 Winter Olympics. She then competed at the 2010 European Championships and qualified for the free skate, finishing 19th. She represented Slovenia at the 2010 Winter Olympics and finished 27th in the short program and did not advance to the free skate. She decided to retire after competing at the 2010 World Championships. There, she finished 34th in the short program after falling on a triple loop and did not advance to the free skate.

== Personal life ==
After retiring from figure skating, Poštič began coaching. She attended university and has a degree in economics.

== Programs ==
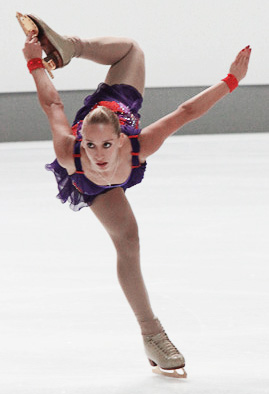
Poštič at the 2009 Nebelhorn Trophy

Season	Short program	Free skating
2008–10	Coeur a Cordes by Pierre Porte	Music by Trans-Siberian Orchestra
2006–07	Wild Time	Moulin Rouge! by various composers
2005–06	Wild Time	The Phantom of the Opera on Ice; Dance of the Four Muses by Roberto Danova
2003–05	My Sweet and Affectionate Beast by Eugen Doga	James Bond 007
2001–02	Batman Forever by Elliot Goldenthal	Storm (from Four Seasons by Vivaldi) performed by Vanessa-Mae

== Competitive highlights ==
JGP: Junior Grand Prix

International
Event	97–98	98–99	99–00	00–01	01–02	02–03	03–04	04–05	05–06	06–07	07–08	08–09	09–10
Olympics													27th
Worlds									30th	36th		35th	34th
Europeans								30th	20th		36th	18th	19th
Golden Spin				24th				12th	5th	6th	12th	8th	7th
Merano Cup											5th		
Nebelhorn Trophy													5th
Nepela Memorial											4th		
Schäfer Memorial								14th				20th	
Triglav Trophy				12th	16th							5th	
Universiade												17th	
International: Junior
Junior Worlds					39th		23rd						
JGP Bulgaria					10th								
JGP Croatia			10th										
JGP Netherlands			16th		10th								
JGP Slovakia							14th						
JGP Slovenia							14th						
JGP Ukraine				19th									
EYOF						17th							
Dragon Trophy						WD	2nd J						
Golden Bear		6th J		11th J	3rd J								
Pajovic Cup							4th J						
Triglav Trophy	22nd N					5th J							
National
Slovenian	6th J	6th J	5th	3rd	3rd	3rd	2nd		1st	1st	1st	1st	1st
WD: Withdrew; Levels: N. = Novice; J. = Junior
