= Golden Bear of Zagreb =

International figure skating competition

- Status: Active
- Frequency: Annual
- Location: Zagreb
- Country: Croatia
- Organiser: Croatian Skating Federation

The Golden Bear of Zagreb (Croatian: Zlatni medvjed) is an annual figure skating competition held in Zagreb, Croatia. Held since 1986, the event was organized by the Medveščak Figure Skating Club. It was originally a companion event to the Golden Spin of Zagreb, intended for junior- and novice-level skaters. In 2012, senior-level events were added. Medals were awarded in men's singles, women's singles, and pair skating.

== Senior results ==
=== Men's singles ===
Men's event medalists
Year	Gold	Silver	Bronze	Ref.
2012	(Austria) Mario Rafael Ionian	(Croatia) Josip Gluhak	No other competitors	
2013	(United Kingdom) David Richardson	(Hungary) Kristof Forgo	(Hungary) Márton Markó	
2015	(Finland) Matthias Versluis	(United Kingdom) Peter James Hallam	(Slovenia) David Kranjec	
2016	(France) Kévin Aymoz	(United Kingdom) Phillip Harris	(Switzerland) Stéphane Walker	
2017	(Italy) Daniel Grassl	(United Kingdom) Graham Newberry	(Switzerland) Lukas Britschgi	
2018	(Italy) Daniel Grassl	(Germany) Paul Fentz	(Italy) Jari Kessler	
2019	(Georgia (country)) Irakli Maysuradze	(Austria) Luc Maierhofer	(Switzerland) Lukas Britschgi	
2025	(Croatia) Jari Kessler	(Czech Republic) Filip Scerba	(Czech Republic) Tadeas Vaclavik	

=== Women's singles ===
Women's event medalists
Year	Gold	Silver	Bronze	Ref.
2012	(Austria) Kerstin Frank	(Slovenia) Nika Cerič	(Italy) Roberta Rodeghiero	
2013	(Russia) Nikol Gosviani	(Slovenia) Daša Grm	(Italy) Carol Bressanutti	
2014	(Italy) Carol Bressanutti	(Slovenia) Daša Grm	(Austria) Sophie Almassy	
2015	(Sweden) Linnea Mellgren	(Austria) Lara Roth	(Italy) Carol Bressanutti	
2016	(France) Laurine Lecavelier	(Italy) Giada Russo	(Germany) Nicole Schott	
2017	(Latvia) Diāna Ņikitina	(Slovenia) Dasa Grm	(Sweden) Matilda Algotsson	
2018	(United Kingdom) Natasha McKay	(Italy) Elettra Olivotto	(Germany) Alissa Scheidt	
2019	(Italy) Alessia Tornaghi	(Austria) Olga Mikutina	(United Kingdom) Natasha McKay	
2025	(Slovenia) Julija Lovrencic	(Italy) Ginevra Lavinia Negrello	(Spain) Ariadna Gupta Espada	

== Junior medalists ==
=== Men's singles ===
Men's event medalists
Year	Gold	Silver	Bronze	Ref.
1996	(Slovenia) Gregor Urbas	(Slovenia) Andrej Gorkič	No other competitors	
1997	(Slovenia) Janez Špoljar	(Italy) Andrea Livi	(Turkey) Tayfun Anar	
1998	(Slovenia) Gregor Urbas	(Germany) Florian Just	(Germany) Michael Ganser	
1999	(Slovenia) Gregor Urbas	(Finland) Ari-Pekka Nurmenkari	(South Africa) Matthew Wilkinson	
2000	(France) Thomas Dussous	(Slovenia) Gregor Urbas	(Israel) Vadim Akolzin	
2001	(Israel) Sergei Kotov	(Turkey) Alper Uçar	(Slovenia) Damjan Ostojič	
2002	(Finland) Mikko Minkkinen	(Finland) Visa Tuominen	(Turkey) Alper Uçar	
2003	(Czech Republic) Pavel Kaška	(Slovenia) Luka Čadež	(Czech Republic) Michal Matloch	
2004	(Croatia) Boris Martinec	(Turkey) Kutay Eryoldas	(Croatia) Josip Gluhak	
2005	(United Kingdom) Thomas Paulson	(Croatia) Josip Gluhak	(Croatia) Boris Martinec	
2006	(Austria) Severin Kiefer	(Austria) Tobias Steindl	(Germany) Juriy Gnilozubov	
2007	(Switzerland) Mikael Redin	(Germany) Martin Rappe	(Croatia) Boris Martinec	
2009	(Croatia) Ivor Mikolčević	No other competitors		
2011	(Croatia) Mislav Blagojević	(Austria) Manuel Drechsler	No other competitors	
2012	(Hungary) Kristof Forgo	(Austria) Albert Mueck	(Slovenia) Krištof Brezar	
2013	(United Kingdom) Charlie Parry-Evans	(Hungary) Alexander Borovoj	(Slovenia) Krištof Brezar	
2014	(Italy) Alessandro Fadini	(Slovenia) Krištof Brezar	(Croatia) Steven Spencer Baker	
2015	(Italy) Daniel Grassl	(Italy) Jari Kessler	(United Kingdom) Josh Brown	
2016	(Italy) Daniel Grassl	(Switzerland) Nurullah Sahaka	(France) Maxence Collet	
2017	(Czech Republic) Filip Scerba	(Italy) Gabriele Frangipani	(Croatia) Charles Katanovic	
2018	(Italy) Gabriele Frangipani	(Sweden) Andreas Nordebäck	(Bulgaria) Alexander Zlatkov	
2019	(Spain) Iker Oyarzabal	(Poland) Egor Khlopkov	(Sweden) Oliver Praetorius	
2025	(Austria) Maksym Petrychenko	(Spain) André Zapata	(United Kingdom) Jack Donovan	

=== Women's singles ===
Women's event medalists
Year	Gold	Silver	Bronze	Ref.
1997	(Finland) Kati Simola	(Austria) Karin Brandstätter	(Slovenia) Anja Beslic	
1998	(Germany) Andrea Diewald	(Germany) Nina Sackerer	(Germany) Veronica Diewald	
1999	(Czech Republic) Lucie Krausová	(Germany) Stephanie Lotterschmid	(Finland) Mari Hirvonen	
2000	(Croatia) Idora Hegel	(Germany) Eva-Maria Fitze	(Germany) Stephanie Lotterschmid	
2001	(Croatia) Idora Hegel	(Slovenia) Anja Bratec	(Slovenia) Teodora Poštič	
2002	(Belarus) Kristina Mikhailova	(Luxembourg) Fleur Maxwell	(Slovenia) Darja Škrlj	
2003	(Czech Republic) Jana Sýkorová	(Croatia) Željka Krizmanić	(Slovenia) Kaja Otovic	
2004	(Finland) Henriikka Hietaniemi	(Croatia) Željka Krizmanić	(Germany) Kristina Geissler	
2005	(Russia) Alexandra Ievleva	(Croatia) Željka Krizmanić	(Croatia) Franka Vugec	
2006	(Sweden) Linnea Mellgren	(Germany) Katharina Gierok	(Hungary) Katherina Hadford	
2007	(Germany) Nicole Gurny	(Switzerland) Virginie Clerc	(Sweden) Linnea Mellgren	
2009	(Slovenia) Patricia Gleščič	(Croatia) Mirna Librić	(Slovenia) Daša Grm	
2011	(Italy) Elettra Olivotto	(Italy) Amella Schwienbacher	(Finland) Noora Ikonen	
2012	(Hungary) Ivett Tóth	(Finland) Seidi Rantanen	(Finland) Evelina Viljanen	
2013	(Slovenia) Pina Umek	(Hungary) Bianka Friesz	(Italy) Alessia Zardini	
2014	(Austria) Violette Ivanoff	(Croatia) Antonia Banović	(Austria) Alexandra Philippova	
2015	(South Korea) Choi Yu-jin	(Italy) Rebecca Ghilardi	(United Kingdom) Anna Litvinenko	
2016	(United States) Starr Andrews	(Sweden) Lisa Lager	(United States) Ashley Kim	
2017	(Canada) Hannah Dawson	(Italy) Lucrezia Beccari	(Belgium) Charlotte Vandersarren	
2018	(Russia) Alena Kanysheva	(United States) Emilia Murdock	(Italy) Lucrezia Beccari	
2019	(Italy) Ginevra Negrello	(Austria) Stefanie Pesendorfer	(Germany) Nargiz Süleymanova	
2025	(Germany) Diana Alexandra Ziesecke	(Italy) Amanda Ghezzo	(Croatia) Paula Kasnar	

=== Pairs ===
Pairs event medalists
Year	Gold	Silver	Bronze	Ref.
2003	(Austria); Sabrina Immervoll; Daniel Lobenwein	No other competitors		
