= Mojca Kopač =

Slovenian figure skater

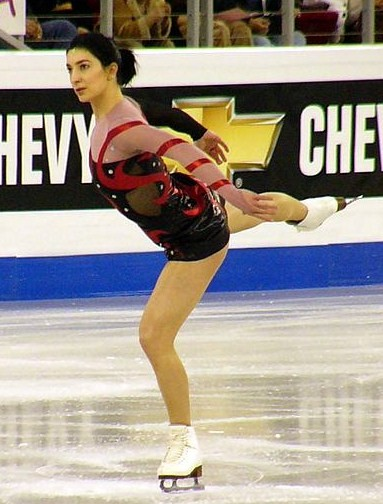
- Kopač in 2004.

Personal information
- Born: 2 May 1975 (age 51) Ljubljana, SR Slovenia
- Height: 1.62 m (5 ft 4 in)

Figure skating career
- Country: Slovenia
- Skating club: Drsalno-Kotalkarski Klub Stanko Bloudek
- Began skating: 1980
- Retired: 2004

Mojca Kopač (born 2 May 1975) is a Slovenian former competitive figure skater. She is the 1993 Ondrej Nepela Memorial champion, the 1996 Golden Spin of Zagreb champion, and a seven-time Slovenian national champion. She represented her country at three Winter Olympics and qualified for the final segment twice – at the 1998 Olympics, where she placed 23rd, and the 2002 Olympics, where she placed 22nd. She reached the free skate at eleven European Championships and four World Championships.

== Personal life ==
Kopač was born on 2 May 1975 in Ljubljana. She married Louis Tiernan in 2007.

The couple have two daughters, Kaya and Lena, the former of whom is a competitive figure skater, currently competing for the United States in the women's singles discipline.

== Career ==
In the 1991–92 season, Kopač won her first senior national title and was sent to her first ISU Championship, the 1992 Europeans in Lausanne, Switzerland, where she placed 23rd. In February, she represented Slovenia at the 1992 Winter Olympics in Albertville, France. Ranked 26th in the short program, she missed the cut-off for the free skate, to which only the top 24 advanced. In March, she competed at the 1992 World Championships in Oakland, California, but was eliminated after placing 25th in the short program.

In the 1992–93 season, Kopač repeated as the Slovenian national champion. She placed 17th in both segments and 18th overall at the 1993 European Championships in Helsinki, Finland. Ranked 16th in her qualifying group, she did not advance to the short program at the 1993 World Championships in Prague.

In the following seasons, Kopač continued to qualify consistently for the free skate at the European Championships. In 1996, she reached the final segment at the World Championships for the first time in her career; she ranked 7th in her qualifying group, 15th in the short, 18th in the free, and 18th overall at the event in Edmonton, Alberta, Canada. The next season, she finished 20th at the 1997 World Championships in Lausanne after placing 13th in her qualifying group, 13th in the short, and 22nd in the free.

In January 1998, Kopač finished 13th (15th in the short, 13th in the free) at the European Championships in Milan, Italy – it was her career-best European result. In February, she competed at her second 1998 Winter Olympics, in Nagano, Japan. Ranked 22nd in the short, she qualified for the free skate and finished 23rd overall. In April, she placed 24th (12th in her qualifying group, 23rd in the short, 24th in the free) at the 1998 World Championships in Minneapolis, Minnesota, USA.

In November 2001, Kopač competed at the Golden Spin of Zagreb, the final Olympic qualifying opportunity. Ranked 7th in the short and 10th in the free, she finished 8th overall in Croatia. Her placement gave Slovenia a spot in the ladies' figure skating event at the 2002 Winter Olympics in Salt Lake City, Utah. At her third Olympics, she qualified for the free skate by placing 19th in the short program and went on to finish 22nd overall.

In March 2003, Kopač qualified for her fourth and final free skate at the World Championships; she was 13th in her qualifying group, 22nd in the short, 17th in the free, and 20th overall at the event in Washington, D.C. In February 2004, she reached her 11th free skate at the European Championships; she ranked 11th in the short, 18th in the free, and 17th overall in Budapest, Hungary.

She retired from competition after the 2004 World Championships and began coaching in Aston, Pennsylvania.

== Programs ==
Season	Short program	Free skating
2003–04	Blues for Klook by Eddy Louiss	Kojiki by Kitarō; Once Upon a Time in the West by Ennio Morricone; Kojiki by Kitaro
2002–03	Blues for Klook by Eddy Louiss	Quidam (from Cirque du Soleil)
2001–02	Nomad (Australian music)	Quidam (from Cirque du Soleil)

== Competitive highlights ==
GP: Champions Series/Grand Prix

International
Event	90–91	91–92	92–93	93–94	94–95	95–96	96–97	97–98	98–99	99–00	00–01	01–02	02–03	03–04
Olympics		26th						23rd				22nd		
Worlds		25th	31st		28th	18th	20th	24th		31st			20th	27th
Europeans		23rd	18th	20th	20th	15th	19th	13th	WD	14th		14th	23rd	17th
GP Lalique									7th					
GP Nations Cup							7th							
Golden Spin	12th				6th	2nd	1st	4th	5th			8th	9th	
Nebelhorn Trophy			14th	9th	17th	12th	10th							
Nepela Memorial				1st				2nd	2nd			3rd		5th
Prague Skate			14th											
Schäfer Memorial		10th	7th	11th	11th	11th	15th						8th	
Skate Israel						8th			5th	7th				
St. Gervais						5th								
Budapest Trophy	6th													
International: Junior
Grand Prize SNP		6th												
Piruetten	5th J.													
National
Slovenian Champ.	3rd	1st	1st	1st	1st	1st	1st	2nd		2nd		1st	1st	1st
