= Damjan Ostojič =

Slovenian figure skater (born 1986)

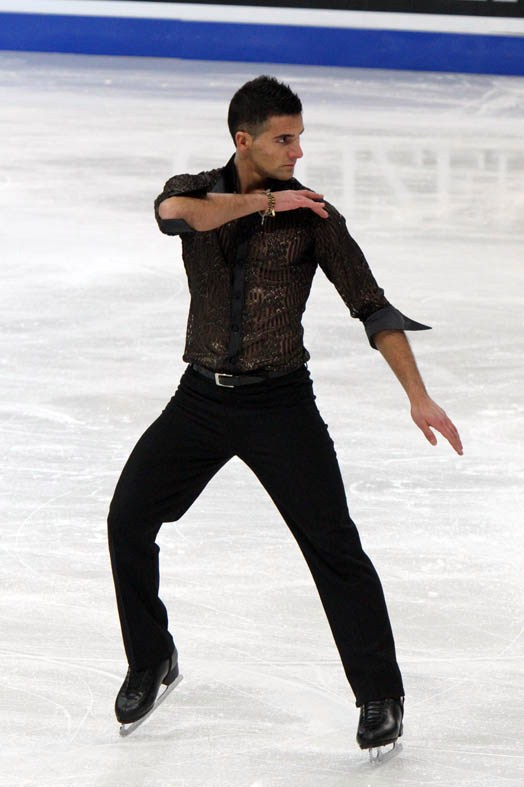
- Ostojič in 2011.

Personal information
- Full name: Damjan Ostojič
- Born: 26 October 1986 (age 39) Ljubljana, Slovenia
- Height: 1.71 m (5 ft 7 in)

Figure skating career
- Country: Bosnia and Herzegovina
- Coach: Marina Pirkmajer
- Skating club: KKK Bosna Sarajevo

Damjan Ostojič (born 26 October 1986 in Ljubljana, Slovenia) is a Slovenian former competitive figure skater who represented both Slovenia and Bosnia and Herzegovina in competition.

Representing Bosnia and Herzegovina, he is the 2007 Merano Cup silver medalist, and a three-time Bosnian national champion (2007-2009).

Representing Slovenia, he is a three-time Slovenian national silver medalist (2004, 2006, 2007) and a four-time Slovenian national bronze medalist (2001-2003, 2005).

On the junior level for Slovenia, he is a two-time Dragon Trophy champion (2002, 2004) and the 2005 Merano Cup silver medalist.

== Programs ==
| Season | Short program | Free skating |
|---|---|---|
| 2010–2011 | Blues | Selection of Music by Goran Bregović |
| 2009–2010 | Blues | Selection of Music by Goran Bregović |
| 2008–2009 | Blues | Selection of Music by Goran Bregović |
| 2004–2005 | The Matrix (soundtrack) | Pirates of the Caribbean soundtrack by Klaus Badelt |
| 2003–2004 | Incantation; Music from Cirque du Soleil by Benoît Jutras | 1492: Conquest of Paradise soundtrack by Vangelis |

== Competitive highlights ==
=== For Bosnia and Herzegovina ===
International
| Event | 06–07 | 07–08 | 08–09 | 09–10 | 10–11 | 11–12 | 12-13 |
|---|---|---|---|---|---|---|---|
| Worlds | | | 33rd | 33rd | | 35th | |
| Europeans | | | 28th | 28th | 31st | | |
| Golden Spin | | 12th | 14th | 13th | | | |
| Ice Challenge | | | | 19th | | | |
| Merano Cup | | 2nd | 10th | | | | |
| Nebelhorn Trophy | | 13th | | 28th | | | |
| NRW Trophy | | 4th | | | | | |
| Ondrej Nepela | | 13th | 22nd | | | | |
National
| Bosnian Champ. | 1st | 1st | 1st | 1st | 1st | 1st | 1st |

=== For Slovenia ===
International
| Event | 97–98 | 98–99 | 99–00 | 00–01 | 01–02 | 02–03 | 03–04 | 04–05 | 05–06 | 06–07 |
|---|---|---|---|---|---|---|---|---|---|---|
| Golden Spin | | | | | | | | 12th | | |
International: Junior
| Junior Worlds | | | | | | 25th | 34th | | | |
| JGP Andorra | | | | | | | | | 12th | |
| JGP Bulgaria | | | | | | | 13th | | 16th | |
| JGP Italy | | | | | 24th | | | | | |
| JGP Netherlands | | | | | 22nd | | | | | |
| JGP Serbia | | | | | | 14th | | 14th | | |
| JGP Slovenia | | | | | | | 17th | | | |
| EYOF | | | | | | 14th J | | | | |
| Dragon Trophy | | | | | 1st J | | 1st J | | | |
| Egna Spring Trophy | | | | | | 10th J | | | | |
| Golden Bear | | | | 6th J | 3rd J | | 9th J | | | |
| Grand Prize SNP | | | | 5th J | | | | | | |
| Merano Cup | | | | | | | | | 2nd J | |
| Triglav Trophy | | | | | | 9th J | 7th J | | | |
National
| Slovenian Champ. | 1st N | 5th | 4th | 3rd | 3rd | 3rd | 2nd | 3rd | 2nd | 2nd |
N. = Novice level; J. = Junior level
