= Linnea Mellgren =

Swedish figure skater

Personal information
- Born: 17 May 1989 (age 37)
- Home town: Enköping, Sweden
- Height: 1.68 m (5 ft 6 in)

Figure skating career
- Country: Sweden
- Coach: Tatiana Agafonova

Linnea Mellgren (born 17 May 1989) is a Swedish former competitive figure skater. She is the 2015 Golden Bear of Zagreb champion, the 2011 Ice Challenge bronze medalist, a two-time (2009, 2011) Nordic silver medalist, and the 2009 Swedish national silver medalist.

== Programs ==
Season	Short program	Free skating
2011–2012	The Black Swan (from Swan Lake) by Pyotr Tchaikovsky	Titanic by James Horner performed by Richard Clayderman

== Competitive highlights ==
JGP: Junior Grand Prix

International
Event	04–05	05–06	06–07	07–08	08–09	09–10	10–11	11–12	13–14	14–15	15–16
Crystal Skate						5th					
Cup of Nice					6th			17th			14th
Cup of Tyrol											7th
Finlandia							8th	7th			
Golden Bear											1st
Ice Challenge							4th	3rd			
Merano Cup						8th	3rd				
Nepela Memorial					5th		5th				
Nordics					2nd	5th	2nd		13th	8th	9th
NRW Trophy							4th	9th		7th	
Triglav Trophy						6th					
Universiade					9th		4th			16th	
International: Junior
JGP Netherlands			9th								
JGP Poland		10th									
JGP Romania			10th								
JGP U.K.				6th							
Golden Bear			1st J	3rd J							
Nordics	8th J	8th J		4th J							
National
Swedish	5th J	2nd J	2nd J	4th	2nd	4th	3rd	3rd	5th	WD	4th
Levels: N = Novice; J = Junior; Mellgren did not compete in the 2012–13 season.
