= Slovenian Figure Skating Championships =

Recurring figure skating competition

- Status: Active
- Genre: National championships
- Frequency: Annual
- Country: Slovenia
- Inaugurated: 1992
- Organizer: Slovene Skating Union

The Slovenian Figure Skating Championships (Slovene: Prvenstvo Slovenije v umetnostnem drsanju) are an annual figure skating competition organized by the Slovene Skating Union (Slovene: Zveza drsalnih športov Slovenije) to crown the national champions of Slovenia. Slovenia declared its independence from Yugoslavia in June 1991. The Slovene Skating Union was established in December 1991 as a federation of Slovenia's four skating clubs (Celje, Stanko Bloudek, Olimpija Ljubljana, and Jesenice), while a fifth skating club (Labod Bled) was later established. The first national skating championships of the newly independent Slovenia were held in 1992 in Celje. Early on, responsibility for hosting the national championships rotated between three cities: Celje, Ljubljana, and Jesenice. They have been held without interruption since their inception.

Medals are awarded in men's and women's singles at the senior and junior levels, although each discipline may not necessarily be held every year due to a lack of participants. Gregor Urbas holds the record for winning the most Slovenian Championship titles in men's singles (with ten), while Daša Grm holds the record in women's singles (with nine).

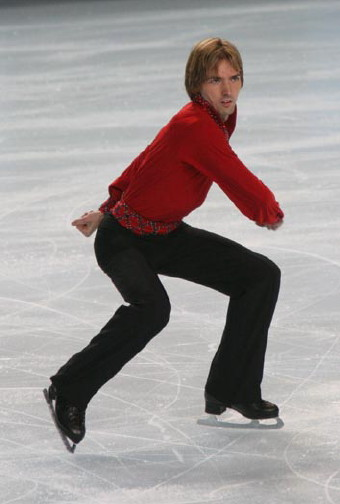
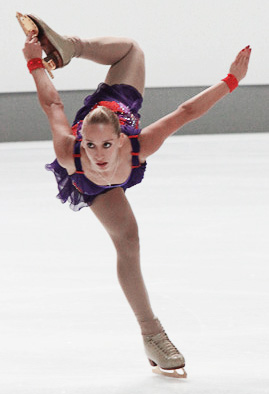
From left to right: Gregor Urbas, ten-time Slovenian champion in men's singles; and Teodora Poštič, five-time Slovenian champion in women's singles

== Senior medalists ==
=== Men's singles ===
Luka Klasinc, winner of the inaugural Slovenian Championships, won the silver medal at the 1991 Yugoslav Figure Skating Championships.

Men's event medalists
Year	Location	Gold	Silver	Bronze	Ref.
1992	Celje	Luka Klasinc	Jan Čejvan	No other competitors	
1993	Jesenice	Jan Čejvan	Jure Kovač	No other competitors	
1994	Ljubljana	Jan Čejvan	No other competitors		
1995	Ljubljana	Jan Čejvan	No other competitors		
1996	Celje	Jan Čejvan	No other competitors		
1997	Ljubljana	Jan Čejvan	Andrej Gorkič	Janez Špoljar	
1998	Jesenice	Jan Čejvan	Janez Špoljar	No other competitors	
1999	Ljubljana	Jan Čejvan	Gregor Urbas	Janez Špoljar	
2000	Ljubljana	Jan Čejvan	Gregor Urbas	Janez Špoljar	
2001	Celje	Gregor Urbas	Jan Čejvan	Ales Zunko	
2002	Ljubljana	Gregor Urbas	Jan Čejvan	Damjan Ostojič	
2003	Celje	Gregor Urbas	Jan Čejvan	Damjan Ostojič	
2004	Jesenice	Gregor Urbas	Damjan Ostojič	Luka Čadež	
2005	Ljubljana	Gregor Urbas	Luka Čadež	Damjan Ostojič	
2006	Jesenice	Gregor Urbas	Damjan Ostojič	Luka Čadež	
2007	Ljubljana	Gregor Urbas	Damjan Ostojič	Luka Čadež	
2008	Bled	Gregor Urbas	Luka Čadež	No other competitors	
2009	Ljubljana	Gregor Urbas	Luka Čadež	No other competitors	
2010	Celje	Gregor Urbas	No other competitors		
2011–15	No men's competitors				
2016	Celje	David Kranjec	No other competitors		
2017–22	No men's competitors				
2023	Jesenice	David Sedej	No other competitors		
2024	Ljubljana	David Sedej	No other competitors		
2025	Celje	David Sedej	No other competitors		
2026	Jesenice	David Sedej	No other competitors		

=== Women's singles ===
Mojca Kopač, six-time Slovenian national champion, won the bronze medal at the 1991 Yugoslav Championships.

Women's event medalists
Year	Location	Gold	Silver	Bronze	Ref.
1992	Celje	Mojca Kopač	Petra Klešnik	No other competitors	
1993	Jesenice	Mojca Kopač	Petra Klešnik	No other competitors	
1994	Ljubljana	Mojca Kopač	Tina Berlot	No other competitors	
1995	Ljubljana	Mojca Kopač	Petra Klešnik	No other competitors	
1996	Celje	Mojca Kopač	Melita Čelesnik	Tina Švajger	
1997	Ljubljana	Mojca Kopač	Tina Švajger	Klara Miletič	
1998	Jesenice	Tina Švajger	Mojca Kopač	Alenka Mrak	
1999	Ljubljana	Anja Beslič	Tina Švajger	Alenka Mrak	
2000	Ljubljana	Anja Beslič	Mojca Kopač	Alenka Zidar	
2001	Celje	Anja Brateč	Anja Beslič	Katjuša Radinovič	
2002	Ljubljana	Tina Švajger	Teodora Poštič	Anja Beslič	
2003	Celje	Mojca Kopač	Tina Švajger	Teodora Poštič	
2004	Jesenice	Mojca Kopač	Teodora Poštič	Anja Brateč	
2005	Ljubljana	Darja Škrlj	Alenka Zidar	No other competitors	
2006	Jesenice	Teodora Poštič	Alenka Zidar	Darja Škrlj	
2007	Ljubljana	Teodora Poštič	Alenka Zidar	Darja Škrlj	
2008	Bled	Teodora Poštič	Kaja Otovič	Darja Škrlj	
2009	Ljubljana	Teodora Poštič	Kaja Otovič	No other competitors	
2010	Celje	Teodora Poštič	No other competitors		
2011	Celje	Patricia Gleščič	Daša Grm	Nika Čerič	
2012	Ljubljana	Patricia Gleščič	Daša Grm	Nika Čerič	
2013	Bled	Patricia Gleščič	Daša Grm	Pina Umek	
2014	Ljubljana	Daša Grm	Pina Umek	Nika Čerič	
2015	Bled	Daša Grm	Pina Umek	Naja Ferkov	
2016	Celje	Daša Grm	Naja Ferkov	Urša Krušec	
2017	Jesenice	Daša Grm	Urša Krušec	No other competitors	
2018	Kranj	Daša Grm	Nina Polšak	Urša Krušec	
2019	Bled	Daša Grm	Maruša Udrih	Nina Polšak	
2020	Ljubljana	Daša Grm	Maruša Udrih	No other competitors	
2021	Kranj	Alja Resman	No other competitors		
2022	Celje	Daša Grm	Maria Daud	Alja Resman	
2023	Jesenice	Daša Grm	Manca Krmelj	Maria Daud	
2024	Ljubljana	Julija Lovrenčič	Lana Omovšek	Ana Kralj	
2025	Celje	Julija Lovrenčič	Nika Sajovic	Sara Urbanc	
2026	Jesenice	Julija Lovrenčič	Nika Ozek Bela	Taisa Khan	

== Junior medalists ==
=== Men's singles ===
Junior men's event medalists
Year	Location	Gold	Silver	Bronze	Ref.
2012	Ljubljana	Krištof Brezar	No other competitors		
2013	Bled	Krištof Brezar	No other competitors		
2014	Ljubljana	Krištof Brezar	No other competitors		
2015	Bled	Krištof Brezar	No other competitors		
2016–18	No junior men's competitors				
2019	Bled	Luka Logar	No other competitors		
2020	Ljubljana	David Sedej	No other competitors		
2021	Kranj	No junior men's competitors			
2022	Celje	David Sedej	No other competitors		
2023–24	No junior men's competitors				
2025	Celje	Žiga Jevnik	No other competitors		
2026	Jesenice	Žiga Jevnik	No other competitors		

=== Women's singles ===
Junior women's event medalists
Year	Location	Gold	Silver	Bronze	Ref.
2012	Ljubljana	Patricija Juren	Pina Umek	Naja Ferkov	
2013	Bled	Naja Ferkov	Evita Čelesnik	Patricija Juren	
2014	Ljubljana	Naja Ferkov	Evita Čelesnik	Zala Prestor	
2015	Bled	Monika Peterka	Nina Polšak	Patricija Juren	
2016	Celje	Monika Peterka	Nina Polšak	Maruša Udrih	
2017	Jesenice	Nina Polšak	Lara Guček	Kaja Gril	
2018	Kranj	Maruša Udrih	Kaja Gril	Nea Smolej	
2019	Bled	Ana Čmer	Lana Omovšek	Kaja Gril	
2020	Ljubljana	Ana Čmer	Manca Krmelj	Lara Hrovat	
2021	Kranj	Julija Lovrenčič	Manca Krmelj	Ana Čmer	
2022	Celje	Julija Lovrenčič	Manca Krmelj	Ana Čmer	
2023	Jesenice	Julija Lovrenčič	Zoja Kramar	Klara Sekardi	
2024	Ljubljana	Zoja Kramar	Vita Kaš	Zala Grum	
2025	Celje	Ula Zadnikar	Zala Grum	Lučka Fortuna	
2026	Jesenice	Ula Zadnikar	Zoja Kramar	Zala Grum	

== Records ==
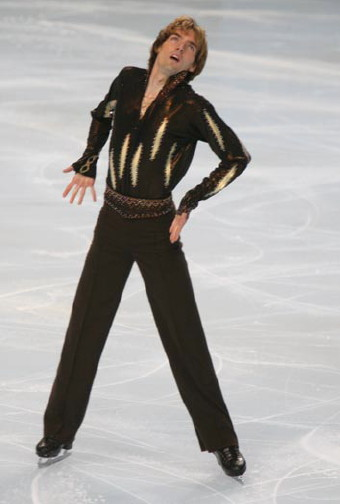
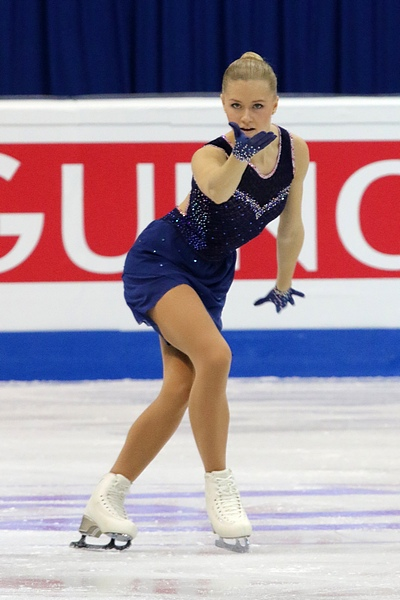
From left to right: Gregor Urbas won ten Slovenian Championship titles in men's singles, and Daša Grm won nine Slovenian Championship titles in women's singles.

Records
Discipline	Most championship titles			
Discipline	Skater(s)	No.	Years	Ref.
Men's singles	Gregor Urbas	10	2001–10	
Women's singles	Daša Grm	9	2014–20; 2022–23	
