= Daša Grm =

Slovene figure skater (born 1991)

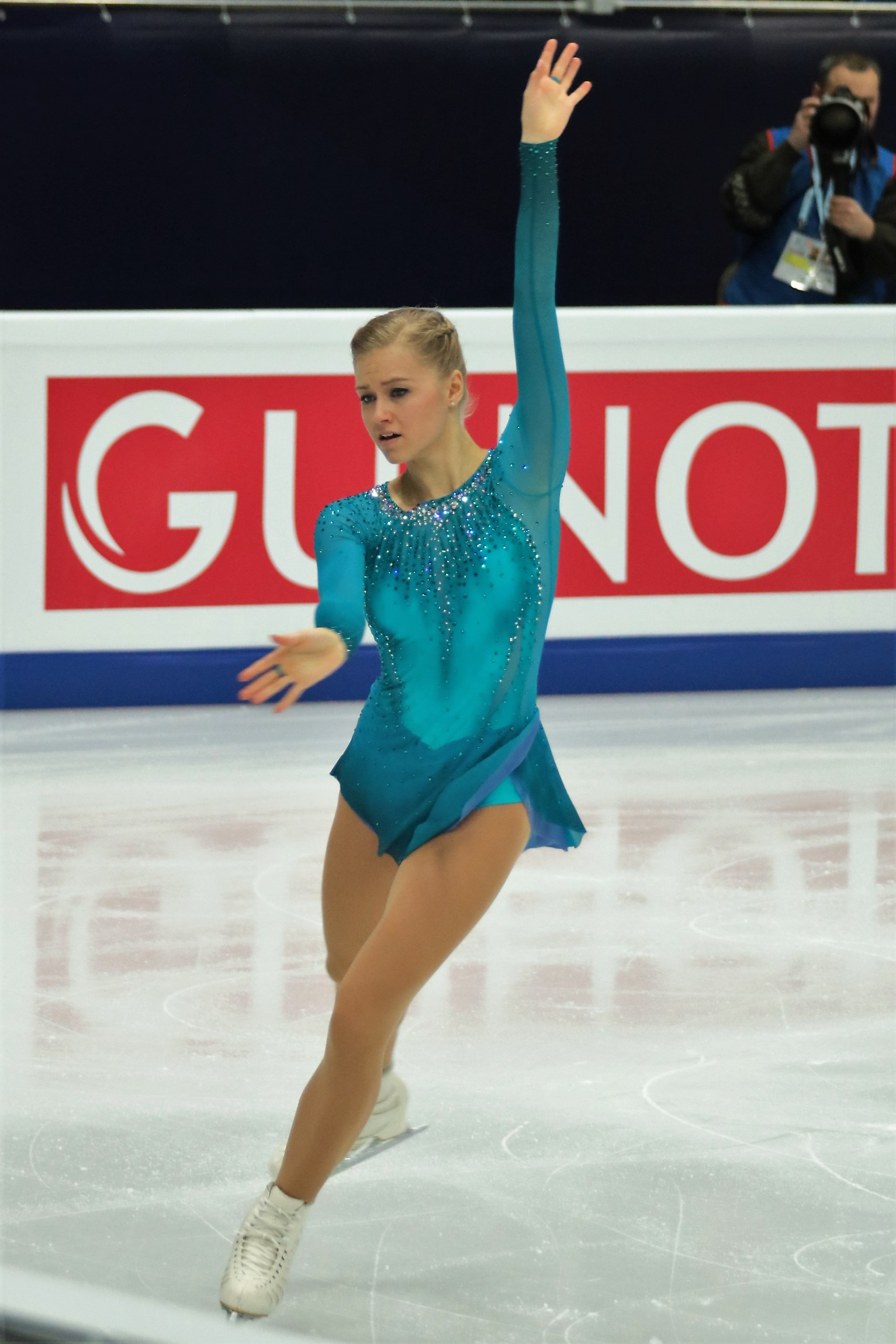
- Grm at the 2018 European Championships

Personal information
- Born: 18 April 1991 (age 35) Celje, Slovenia
- Height: 1.62 m (5.3 ft)

Figure skating career
- Country: Slovenia
- Discipline: Women's singles
- Began skating: 1996
- Retired: April 13, 2024

Daša Grm (born 18 April 1991) is a Slovenian retired figure skater. She is a two-time Dragon Trophy champion (2012, 2016), the 2015 Hellmut Seibt Memorial champion, the 2017 Ice Challenge champion, a two-time Golden Bear of Zagreb silver medalist (2013, 2017), and a seven-time Slovenia national champion (2014–2020). She has competed in the final segment at eight ISU Championships, including four World Championships (2015, 2018, 2019, 2022).

== Personal life ==
Daša Grm was born on 18 April 1991 in Celje, Slovenia. She studied kinesiology at university and graduated with a bachelor's degree. Her father, Stanislav Grm, is a former ski jumper.

In September 2025, she welcomed a son with her partner, Anej Wagner.

== Career ==
Grm appeared on the novice level until the end of the 2003–04 season. She competed at her first ISU Junior Grand Prix (JGP) event in autumn 2004. Her ISU Championship debut came in March 2006 at the World Junior Championships in Ljubljana, Slovenia. She finished twenty-fifth that year and forty-third in 2007 in Oberstdorf, Germany.

Grm made her senior international debut in November 2008 at the Golden Spin of Zagreb, finishing fifteenth, but continued to appear sporadically on the junior level. She ranked forty-sixth at the 2009 World Junior Championships in Sofia, Bulgaria.

Grm made her first appearance in a senior ISU Championship in January 2011 at the European Championships in Bern, Switzerland. She qualified for the free skate and finished twentieth overall. Competing in April 2011 at the World Championships in Moscow, she advanced from the preliminary round to the short program, where she was eliminated. Grm did not reach the short program at the World Championships in Nice, France. Anja Bratec coached her at the time.

Jan Čejvan became Grm's coach by 2013. In January 2014, she placed twenty-seventh in the short program at the European Championships in Budapest, Hungary; she did not qualify to the next segment. In the 2014–15 season, Grm competed at two ISU Challenger Series events, placing twelfth at the Warsaw Cup and then fourth at the Golden Spin of Zagreb. In January 2015, she won a bronze medal at the Toruń Cup but was unable to reach the free skate at the European Championships, placing thirtieth in the short program in Stockholm, Sweden. The following month, she won gold at the Hellmut Seibt Memorial. In March 2015, she competed at the World Championships in Shanghai, China. Ranked twenty-second in the short program, she qualified for the free skate, where she placed eighteenth, pulling her up to eighteenth overall.

During the 2017–18 season, Grm qualified to the free skater at both Europeans and Worlds. However, she failed to qualify for the 2018 Winter Olympics. The following year, Grm finished a career-best seventeenth-place at Europeans and for the second time placed in the top 20 at Worlds. She also successfully landed a Triple-Triple combination in competition at the short program at worlds for the first time in her career.

Grm failed to qualify for the free skating segment at the 2021 World Figure Skating Championships, thus failing to qualify a berth for the Beijing Olympics. At the Nebelhorn Trophy later in the year, Grm qualified as the fourth alternate for the Winter Olympics. She concluded the season with a disappointing twenty-fourth place at the 2022 World Championships.

Grm had a rough start to the new quad, not skating a clean SP or FS in the whole season. Grm however did manage to qualify for her fourth ISU European Championship, finishing in twenty-first place.

In April 2024, she announced her retirement from competitive figure skating.

== Programs ==
Season	Short program	Free skating	Exhibition
2022–2023	Near Light by Ólafur Arnalds; Breathe Me by Sia	Close Your Eyes by Florian Christl and The Modern String Quintet; Human by Christina Perri; I Was Here by Beyoncé	
2020–2022	So Close (from Broadchurch) by Ólafur Arnalds, feat. Arnór Dan	Epilogue; Happiness Does Not Wait by Ólafur Arnalds; Man on a Mission by Oh the Larceny	
2018–2020	Bloodstream by Tokio Myers choreo. by Dasa Grm	Pretty Hurts by Beyoncé; Only the Winds by Ólafur Arnalds; I Was Here by Beyoncé choreo. by Dasa Grm	
2016–2018	Blucobalto by Negramaro; Sax by Fleur East	Pamit by Tulus; Eden Roc by Ludovico Einaudi; Human by Christina Perri	
2015–2016	The St. Louis Blues by Hugh Laurie	Ponds by Biggi Hilmars	
2014–2015	Priča o Vasi Ladačkom by Đorđe Balašević	War Hero by Biggi Hilmars	Med Iskrenimi Ljudmi by Majda Sepe
2013–2014	Priča o Vasi Ladačkom by Đorđe Balašević	Latin Tango by Rodrigo Favela	
2010–2012	Gypsy by Roni Benise	Blues Instrumental by Jethro Tull; September by John Tesh; Blues Instrumental by Jethro Tull	
2008–2009	Romantic by Hans Zimmer	Frozen by Madonna; House of Techno (Club dance mix) by Enigma	
2006–2007	Budapest Night by J. Brahms	Red Violin by Vanessa-Mae	
2005–2006	Budapest Night by J. Brahms	Faces in Stone by John Polito; In the Mirror by Yanni; Travel Express to France by R. Cooder	
2004–2005	Viva Spain	Faces in Stone	

== Results ==
GP: Grand Prix; CS: Challenger Series; JGP: Junior Grand Prix

International
Event	04–05	05–06	06–07	07–08	08–09	09–10	10–11	11–12	12–13	13–14	14–15	15–16	16–17	17–18	18–19	19–20	20–21	21–22	22–23
Worlds							28th	39th			18th	38th	36th	22nd	18th		34th	24th	33rd
Europeans							20th			27th	30th	26th	26th	20th	17th	20th		27th	21st
GP Rostelecom												12th							
CS Budapest																	5th		12th
CS Finlandia													17th						
CS Golden Spin											4th	8th		9th	9th	8th		16th	WD
CS Lombardia													WD					15th	
CS Mordovian												6th							
CS Nebelhorn														14th				12th	
CS Warsaw Cup											12th		9th						
Budapest Trophy																		11th	
Celje Open																	2nd		
Challenge Cup								22nd	10th							15th	WD		
Coupe Printemps													7th						
Crystal Skate															5th				
Cup of Nice									12th										
Cup of Tyrol													3rd						
Dragon Trophy								1st	2nd	3rd		1st			4th	3rd		1st	7th
Egna Trophy																	3rd		
FBMA Trophy													3rd						
Golden Bear									4th	2nd				2nd	5th	15th			
Golden Spin							4th	18th	8th	5th									
Hellmut Seibt									6th		1st	3rd							
Ice Challenge							8th	8th	8th	6th				1st					
Merano Cup								7th											
Nebelhorn										19th									
Ondrej Nepela									9th										
Prague Ice Cup																2nd			
Santa Claus Cup																	WD	5th	6th
Skate Celje																		2nd	3rd
Skate Helena									1st									1st	
Slovenia Open										2nd									
Sofia Trophy																3rd	6th		
Tirnavia Ice Cup																		4th	5th
Toruń Cup											3rd								
Triglav Trophy							10th	5th		9th									
Universiade							9th		11th		13th		10th						
Volvo Cup									3rd	9th					15th				
International: Junior
Junior Worlds		25th	43rd		46th														
JGP Belarus					17th	16th													
JGP Czech Republic					13th														
JGP Hungary			13th																
JGP Romania				18th															
JGP U.K.				27th															
JGP Ukraine	28th																		
National
Slovenian Champ.			1st J		3rd	3rd	2nd	2nd	2nd	1st	1st	1st	1st	1st	1st	1st			1st
TBD = Assigned; WD = Withdrew; C = Cancelled
