= Merano Cup =

International figure skating competition

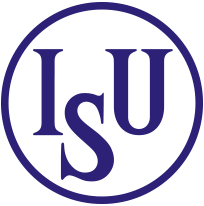
- Location: Italy

The Merano Cup (Italian: Coppa di Merano) was an annual international figure skating competition which is generally held in November in Merano, Italy. Medals were awarded in men's singles, women's singles, and pair skating at the senior, junior, and novice levels. The competition was last held in 2017.

== Senior medalists ==
=== Men's singles ===
Year	Gold	Silver	Bronze	Ref.
2003	(Italy) Fabio Mascarello	(Austria) Florian Mistelbauer	(Australia) Sean Carlow	
2004	(France) Samuel Contesti	(France) Yoann Deslot	(Sweden) Kalle Strid	
2005	(France) Frédéric Dambier	(France) Jérémie Colot	(France) Yoann Deslot	
2006	(Canada) Ken Rose	(Italy) Paolo Bacchini	(Croatia) Boris Martinec	
2007	(Italy) Paolo Bacchini	(Bosnia and Herzegovina) Damjan Ostojič	(Poland) Mateusz Chruściński	
2008	(Japan) Yasuharu Nanri	(Italy) Paolo Bacchini	(Poland) Konstantin Tupikov	
2009	(Spain) Javier Fernández	(Italy) Paolo Bacchini	(Sweden) Alexander Majorov	
2010	(Japan) Takahito Mura	(Italy) Paolo Bacchini	(Sweden) Kristoffer Berntsson	
2011	(Japan) Daisuke Murakami	(Czech Republic) Pavel Kaška	(Italy) Paolo Bacchini	
2012	(Italy) Paolo Bacchini	(Czech Republic) Pavel Kaška	(Germany) Christopher Berneck	
2013	(Kazakhstan) Denis Ten	(Japan) Daisuke Murakami	(Italy) Paolo Bacchini	
2014	(Japan) Ryuju Hino	(Italy) Matteo Rizzo	(Germany) Christopher Berneck	
2015	(Russia) Konstantin Menshov	(Italy) Matteo Rizzo	(Czech Republic) Jiří Bělohradský	
2016	(Switzerland) Stéphane Walker	(Italy) Maurizio Zandron	(United Kingdom) Graham Newberry	
2017	(United Kingdom) Graham Newberry	(Spain) Javier Raya	(Italy) Daniel Grassl	

=== Women's singles ===
Year	Gold	Silver	Bronze	Ref.
2001	(Italy) Alessandra Faietti	(Italy) Lea Norma Bottacini	(Slovenia) Alenka Zidar	
2003	(Australia) Miriam Manzano	(Italy) Valentina Marchei	(Finland) Sanna Remes	
2004	(Hungary) Viktória Pavuk	(Italy) Valentina Marchei	(France) Candice Didier	
2005	(Finland) Kiira Korpi	(Italy) Valentina Marchei	(Italy) Caterina Gabanella	
2006	(Austria) Kathrin Freudelsperger	(Italy) Nicole Della Monica	(Italy) Marcella de Trovato	
2007	(Italy) Valentina Marchei	(Poland) Anna Jurkiewicz	(Romania) Roxana Luca	
2008	(Italy) Valentina Marchei	(Slovakia) Ivana Reitmayerová	(Italy) Francesca Rio	
2009	(Italy) Carolina Kostner	(Japan) Satsuki Muramoto	(Italy) Valentina Marchei	
2010	(Sweden) Viktoria Helgesson	(Japan) Yuka Kono	(Sweden) Linnea Mellgren	
2011	(Estonia) Jelena Glebova	(France) Lénaëlle Gilleron-Gorry	(Sweden) Joshi Helgesson	
2012	(Germany) Sarah Hecken	(Slovakia) Nicole Rajičová	(Australia) Brooklee Han	
2013	(Germany) Nathalie Weinzierl	(Germany) Sarah Hecken	(Italy) Carol Bressanutti	
2014	(Italy) Roberta Rodeghiero	(Italy) Giada Russo	(Switzerland) Eveline Brunner	
2015	(Russia) Alena Leonova	(Italy) Giada Russo	(Czech Republic) Elizaveta Ukolova	
2016	(Italy) Giada Russo	(South Korea) Choi Yu-jin	(United Kingdom) Kristen Spours	
2017	(Italy) Giada Russo	(United Kingdom) Natasha McKay	(Singapore) Chloe Ing	

=== Pair skating ===
Year	Gold	Silver	Bronze	Ref.
2013	(Italy); Stefania Berton; Ondřej Hotárek	(Germany); Maylin Wende; Daniel Wende	(Germany); Mari Vartmann; Aaron Van Cleave	
2016	(North Korea); Ryom Tae-ok; Kim Ju-sik	No other competitors		

== Junior medalists ==
=== Men's singles ===
Year	Gold	Silver	Bronze	Ref.
2001	(Slovenia) Damjan Ostojič	(Slovenia) Luka Čadež	(Finland) Henry Rautiainen	
2003	(United Kingdom) Matthew Parr	(United Kingdom) Elliot Hilton	(United Kingdom) Thomas Paulson	
2004	(Germany) Patrick Stein	(Sweden) Justus Strid		
2005	(Italy) Marco Fabbri	(Slovenia) Damjan Ostojič	(Ukraine) Yaroslav Fursov	
2006	(Italy) Ruben Errampalli	(Canada) Sebastien Wolfe	(Canada) Ronald Lam	
2007	(Italy) Luca Demattè	(Italy) Maurizio Zandron	(Switzerland) Noah Scherer	
2008	(Netherlands) Boyito Mulder	(Italy) Luca Demattè	(Italy) Filippo Ambrosini	
2009	(Czech Republic) Petr Coufal	(Germany) Franz Streubel	(Poland) Kamil Białas	
2010	(Germany) Paul Fentz	(Czech Republic) Miroslav Dvorak	(Czech Republic) Tomáš Kupka	
2011	(Germany) Niko Ulanovsky	(Germany) Panagiotis Polizoakis	(France) Adrien Tesson	
2012	(France) Charles Tetar	(Italy) Alessandro Pezzoli	(Czech Republic) Tomáš Kupka	
2013	(Germany) Alexander Bjelde	(Italy) Matteo Rizzo	(Switzerland) Carlo Röthlisberger	
2014	(Switzerland) Nicola Todeschini	(Italy) Adrien Bannister	(Italy) Alessandro Fadini	
2015	(Italy) Daniel Grassl	(France) Arthur Ribes	(Czech Republic) Matyáš Bělohradský	
2016	(Russia) Egor Murashov	(Italy) Daniel Grassl	(Czech Republic) Matyáš Bělohradský	
2017	(Italy) Gabriele Frangipani	(Italy) Paolo Balestri	(Switzerland) Tomàs-Llorenç Guarino Sabaté	

=== Women's singles ===
Year	Gold	Silver	Bronze	Ref.
2001	(Italy) Martina Sasanelli	(Slovenia) Teodora Poštič	(Germany) Stefanie Lotterschmid	
2003	(Italy) Caterina Gabanella	(Finland) Melisa Lahdeoja	(United Kingdom) Karla Quinn	
2004	(Italy) Stefania Berton	(France) Aurelie Verlor	(France) Nadège Bobillier	
2005	(Italy) Roberta Rodeghiero	(Czech Republic) Petra Vaumunová	(Italy) Giorgia Bombardieri	
2006	(Spain) Sonia Lafuente	(Italy) Deborah Sacchi	(Canada) Vanessa Juteau	
2007	(Canada) Kirsten Moore-Towers	(Italy) Roberta Rodeghiero	(Italy) Alice Velati	
2008	(Italy) Alice Garlisi	(Slovakia) Alexandra Kunová	(Switzerland) Romy Bühler	
2009	(Germany) Luisa Weber	(Slovenia) Patricia Gleščič	(Netherlands) Joyce Den Hollander	
2010	(France) Anaïs Ventard	(Italy) Sofia Curci	(France) Aline Zerourou	
2011	(France) Anaïs Ventard	(Italy) Elettra Maria Olivotto	(France) Bahia Taleb	
2012	(France) Bahia Taleb	(Italy) Sara Casella	(Italy) Guia Maria Tagliapietra	
2013	(France) Nadjma Mahamoud	(Italy) Guia Maria Tagliapietra	(Italy) Giada Russo	
2014	(Kazakhstan) Elizabet Tursynbayeva	(France) Léa Serna	(Germany) Kristina Isaev	
2015	(Germany) Alissa Scheidt	(Germany) Kristina Isaev	(Italy) Marta Castagno	
2016	(Italy) Lucrezia Gennaro	(Italy) Elisabetta Leccardi	(Czech Republic) Dahyun Ko	
2017	(Italy) Lucrezia Beccari	(Switzerland) Maïa Mazzara	(Switzerland) Anaïs Coraducci	

=== Pair skating ===
Year	Gold	Silver	Bronze	Ref.
2016	(Italy); Irma Angela Caldara; Edoardo Caputo	No other competitors		
