= Carol Bressanutti =

Italian figure skater

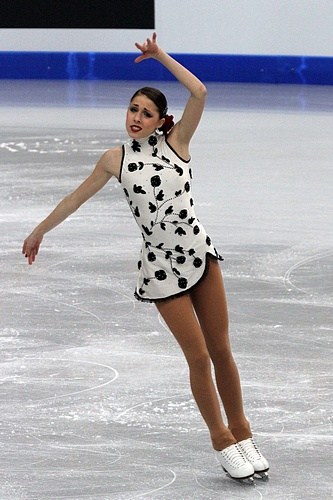
- Bressanutti in 2012

Personal information
- Born: 14 April 1993 (age 33) Bolzano, Italy
- Home town: Bolzano
- Height: 1.70 m (5 ft 7 in)

Figure skating career
- Country: Italy
- Coach: Lorenzo Magri
- Skating club: Ice Skating Bolzano
- Began skating: 2002
- Retired: March 1, 2016

Carol Bressanutti (born 14 April 1993) is an Italian former competitive figure skater. She has won seven senior international medals. At the 2012 World Junior Championships, she qualified for the free skate and finished 18th.

== Programs ==
Season	Short program	Free skating
2014–2015	Suite for Solo Cello by Johann Sebastian Bach	La vie en rose
2013–2014		Sabrina (soundtrack)
2012–2013	Besame Mucho by Artie Shaw	Sabrina (soundtrack)
2011–2012	Summertime by Franck Pourcel	Adios Nonino by Astor Piazzolla

== Competitive highlights ==
CS: Challenger Series; JGP: Junior Grand Prix

International
Event	09–10	10–11	11–12	12–13	13–14	14–15	15–16
Worlds				27th			
CS Finlandia						13th	
CS Golden Spin							13th
Bavarian Open		12th	8th	11th		14th	
Crystal Skate						2nd	
Cup of Nice				21st			
Denkova-Staviski						7th	
Finlandia Trophy					12th		
Gardena		6th					
Golden Bear					3rd	1st	3rd
Golden Spin		6th	9th	6th			
Ice Challenge			11th				
Lombardia Trophy					5th		
Merano Cup				10th	3rd		
Mladost Trophy				2nd			
Mont Blanc		5th					
Nebelhorn Trophy				17th			
Printemps						5th	
Seibt Memorial				3rd	8th		17th
Triglav Trophy		5th					
Universiade						21st	
International: Junior
Junior Worlds			18th				
JGP Poland			16th				
Merano Cup	11th J	8th J					
Skate Celje		1st J					
National
Italian Champ.	16th J	4th	4th	5th	4th	9th	10th
J = Junior level
