= Alessia Tornaghi =

Italian figure skater

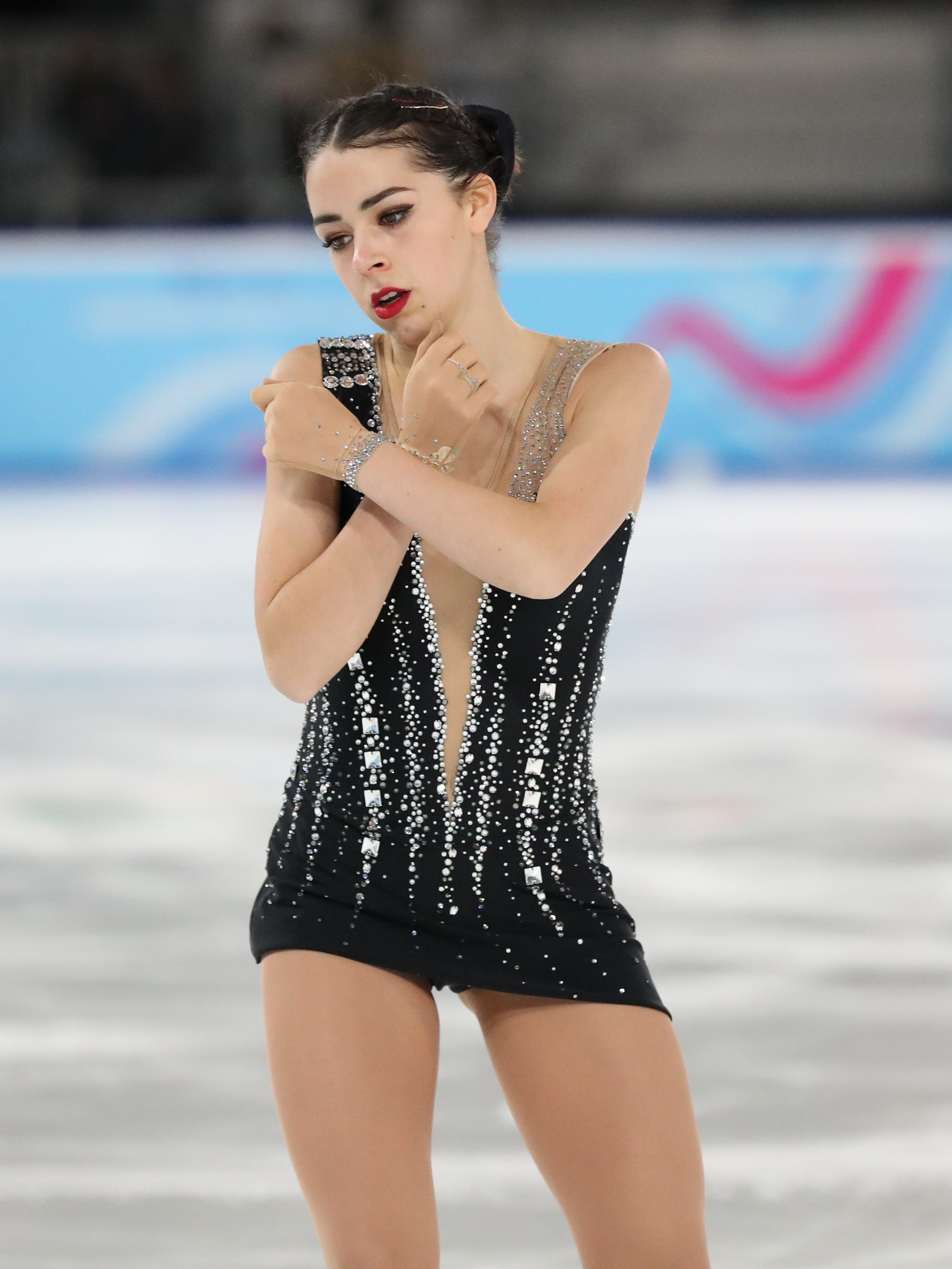
- Tornaghi at the 2020 Winter Youth Olympics

Personal information
- Born: 3 July 2003 (age 23) Milan, Italy
- Height: 1.65 m (5 ft 5 in)

Figure skating career
- Country: Bosnia and Herzegovina (since 2024); Italy (until 2024)
- Discipline: Women's singles
- Coach: Alexei Letov; Olga Ganicheva
- Skating club: Agora Skating Team Milan
- Began skating: 2008

Medal record
Representing Italy
Italian Championships
| Gold medal – first place | 2019 Trento | Singles |
| Gold medal – first place | 2020 Bergamo | Singles |

Alessia Tornaghi (born 3 July 2003) is an Italian figure skater who currently competes for Bosnia and Herzegovina.

She is a two-time Italian national champion and the 2019 Golden Bear of Zagreb champion. On the junior level, she is the 2019 JGP Italy bronze medalist.

== Personal life ==
Alessia Tornaghi was born on 3 July 2003 in Milan, Italy.

== Career ==
=== Early career ===
Tornaghi began learning to skate in 2008. She was the 2015 Italian national novice champion and won seven medals internationally as an advanced novice. Tornaghi is the 2016 and 2017 Italian national junior silver medalist.

=== 2017–2018 season ===
Tornaghi made her junior international debut at 2017 JGP Austria, where she finished 14th. She then won the silver medal at 2017 Cup of Nice, the gold medal at 2017 Leo Scheu Memorial, and placed sixth at 2017 Merano Cup.

Tornaghi finished fourth at the 2018 Italian Championships behind Lucrezia Beccari, Lara Naki Gutmann, and Marina Piredda, after winning silver for the past two seasons. She finished her season with silver medals at 2018 Sofia Trophy and 2018 Coupe du Printemps and bronze medals at 2018 Jégvirág Cup and 2018 Egna Spring Trophy.

=== 2018–2019 season ===
Tornaghi began training with Viktoria Butsaeva in Moscow in September. She started the season with another 14th-place finish at 2018 JGP Slovakia. Tornaghi then finished sixth at 2018 Golden Bear of Zagreb and won silver medals at the 2018 Inge Solar Memorial–Alpen Trophy and the 2018 Christmas Cup.

Tornaghi won the gold medal in the senior division at the 2019 Italian Championships ahead of Lucrezia Beccari and Lara Naki Gutmann, but was not named to the 2019 Junior World Championships team. She went on to win the bronze medal at 2019 Skate Helena, golds at 2019 Sofia Trophy and 2019 Cup of Tyrol, and ended her season with the silver medal at 2019 Egna Spring Trophy.

=== 2019–2020 season ===
Tornaghi placed ninth at 2019 JGP Croatia before winning her first JGP medal, a bronze, at 2019 JGP Italy behind Russians Ksenia Sinitsyna and Anna Frolova. In her senior international debut, she placed fourth at 2019 CS Ice Star after a free skate comeback from twelfth in the short program. Tornaghi won her first senior title and international medal at 2019 Golden Bear of Zagreb after becoming the first Italian lady since Carolina Kostner to successfully complete a triple lutz-triple toe loop combination in the short program. She rallied from 13th after the short program to finish fifth at 2019 CS Warsaw Cup after finishing second in the free skate behind only eventual champion Ekaterina Kurakova of Poland.

Tornaghi won the gold medal for a second consecutive season at the 2020 Italian Championships, this time ahead of Marina Piredda and Lara Naki Gutmann. She will compete at the 2020 Winter Youth Olympics and the 2020 European Championships.

Tornaghi was chosen by the Italian National Olympic Committee to replace short track athlete Elisa Confortola as the flag-bearer for the Italian national team at the 2020 Winter Youth Olympics, after Confortola had scheduling conflicts. At the 2020 Winter Youth Olympics, she finished sixth in the individual event and helped Team Motivation to a fifth-place finish in the team event by placing third in the ladies free skating behind Ksenia Sinitsyna and Anna Frolova of Russia.

Tornaghi finished eighth at the 2020 European Championships. She then finished the season with a thirteenth-place result at the 2020 World Junior Championships. Tornaghi had been scheduled to represent Italy at the 2020 World Championships, but these were cancelled due to the COVID-19 pandemic.

=== 2020–2021 season ===
Tornaghi was scheduled to make her senior Grand Prix debut at the 2020 Internationaux de France, but the event was cancelled as a result of the pandemic. She was fourth at Italian Nationals.

=== 2022–2023 season ===
Tornaghi switched her training location to Norwood, Massachusetts, with Alexei Letov and Olga Ganicheva.

She started her season off at the 2022 CS U.S. International Figure Skating Classic. She came in eighth with a score of 133.48. Her next competition was the 2022 CS Warsaw Cup. She was twenty-first with a score of 118.58. At Italian Nationals, she came in eighth

=== 2023–2024 season ===
Tornaghi was scheduled to compete at Italian Nationals this season but withdrew.

=== 2024–25 and 2025–26 season ===
In August, Tornaghi announced she was switching nationalities to compete for Bosnia and Herzegovina.

== Programs ==
| Season | Short program | Free skating | Exhibition |
|---|---|---|---|
| 2025–2026 | Adagio in G Minor for Strings and Organ by Tomaso Albinoni performed by Wolfgang Hochstein & Helmut Winschermann; Adagio in G minor (Epic Cinematic Version) performed by George Leousis choreo. by Edoardo De Bernardis | Alcoba azul; Solo tu; The Floating Bed (from Frida) by Elliot Goldenthal performed by Lila Downs; De mi vera te fuistes (Seguiriyas) by Pepe Romero & Chano Lobato choreo. by Edoardo De Bernardis | |
| 2022–2023 | Naqoyqatsi and Ensemble by Philip Glass; Plunder by Ghostwriter, Michael H. Lee choreo. by Edoardo De Bernardis | Cinema Paradiso by Ennio Morricone performed by pianist William Joseph; Remember from Cinema Paradiso by Ennio Morricone performed by Monica Mancini; Fuga, Ricerca e Ritorno by Ennio Morricone choreo. by Edoardo De Bernardis | |
| 2020–2021 | The Messiah Will Come Again by Ray Buchanan choreo. by Edoardo De Bernardis | I Am What I Am by Jerry Herman performed by Gloria Gaynor choreo. by Edoardo De Bernardis | |
| 2019–2020 | Piano Concerto No. 3; Trio élégiaque No. 1 by Sergei Rachmaninoff choreo. by Edoardo De Bernardis; The Matrix by Don Davis choreo. by Edoardo De Bernardis | With One Look (from Sunset Boulevard) performed by Barbra Streisand by Andrew Lloyd Webber choreo. by Edoardo De Bernardis | |
| 2018–2019 | Don't Stop 'Til You Get Enough; You Are Not Alone; Smooth Criminal by Michael Jackson choreo. by Marilù Guarnieri | Romeo & Juliet by Abel Korzeniowski choreo. by Marilù Guarnieri | Love You Anymore by Michael Bublé |
| 2017–2018 | Sultan in Love by Princess of Violin choreo. by Andrea Gilardi | Nero (from Anna Karenina) by Two Steps from Hell; Flashlights (from Admiral) by Ruslan Muratov choreo. by Barbara Riboldi | |
| 2016–2017 | Tango de Amor (from The Addams Family | Nero (from Anna Karenina) by Two Steps from Hell; Flashlights (from Admiral) by Ruslan Muratov choreo. by Barbara Riboldi | |
| 2015–2016 | | Vado al massimo by Vasco Rossi | |

== Competitive highlights ==
- JGP – Event of the ISU Junior Grand Prix Series
- CS – Event of the ISU Challenger Series

=== Single skating (for Italy) ===
Competition placements at senior level
| Season | 2018–19 | 2019–20 | 2020–21 | 2022–23 |
|---|---|---|---|---|
| European Championships | | 8th | | |
| Italian Championships | 1st | 1st | 4th | 7th |
| CS Ice Star | | 4th | | |
| CS U.S. Classic | | | | 8th |
| CS Warsaw Cup | | 5th | | 21st |
| Golden Bear of Zagreb | | 1st | | |

Competition placements at junior level
| Season | 2015–16 | 2016–17 | 2017–18 | 2018–19 | 2019–20 |
|---|---|---|---|---|---|
| Winter Youth Olympics | | | | | 6th |
| Winter Youth Olympics (Team event) | | | | | 5th |
| World Junior Championships | | | | | 13th |
| Italian Championships | 2nd | 2nd | 4th | | |
| JGP Austria | | | 14th | | |
| JGP Croatia | | | | | 9th |
| JGP Italy | | | | | 3rd |
| JGP Slovakia | | | | 14th | |
| Alpen Trophy | | | | 2nd | |
| Christmas Cup | | | | 2nd | |
| Coupe du Printemps | | | 2nd | | |
| Cup of Nice | | | 3rd | | |
| Cup of Tyrol | | | | 1st | |
| Egna Spring Trophy | | | 3rd | 2nd | |
| Golden Bear of Zagreb | | | | 6th | |
| Jégvirág Cup | | | 3rd | | |
| Leo Scheu Memorial | | | 1st | | |
| Merano Cup | | | 6th | | |
| Skate Helena | | | | 3rd | |
| Sofia Trophy | | | 2nd | 1st | |

== Detailed results ==
ISU personal best scores in the +5/-5 GOE System
| Segment | Type | Score | Event |
|---|---|---|---|
| Total | TSS | 178.60 | 2020 Winter Youth Olympics |
| Short program | TSS | 62.19 | 2020 Winter Youth Olympics |
| Short program | TES | 35.27 | 2020 European Championships |
| Short program | PCS | 27.86 | 2020 Winter Youth Olympics |
| Free skating | TSS | 125.22 | 2020 Winter Youth Olympics (Team event) |
| Free skating | TES | 67.31 | 2019 CS Warsaw Cup |
| Free skating | PCS | 58.41 | 2020 Winter Youth Olympics |

=== Single skating (for Italy) ===
==== Senior level ====
Results in the 2018–19 season
| Date | Event | SP | | FS | | Total | |
| Date | Event | P | Score | P | Score | P | Score |
|---|---|---|---|---|---|---|---|
| Dec 13–16, 2018 | (Italy) 2019 Italian Championships | 2 | 57.05 | 1 | 117.34 | 1 | 174.39 |

Results in the 2019–20 season
| Date | Event | SP | | FS | | Total | |
| Date | Event | P | Score | P | Score | P | Score |
|---|---|---|---|---|---|---|---|
| Oct 18–20, 2019 | (Belarus) 2019 CS Ice Star | 12 | 47.73 | 4 | 105.43 | 4 | 153.16 |
| Oct 24–27, 2019 | (Croatia) 2019 Golden Bear of Zagreb | 3 | 59.84 | 1 | 118.30 | 1 | 178.14 |
| Nov 14–17, 2019 | (Poland) 2019 CS Warsaw Cup | 13 | 50.31 | 2 | 122.35 | 5 | 172.66 |
| Dec 12–15, 2019 | (Italy) 2020 Italian Championships | 1 | 68.86 | 1 | 121.16 | 1 | 190.02 |
| Jan 20–26, 2020 | (Austria) 2020 European Championships | 7 | 61.27 | 11 | 110.90 | 8 | 172.17 |

Results in the 2020–21 season
| Date | Event | SP | | FS | | Total | |
| Date | Event | P | Score | P | Score | P | Score |
|---|---|---|---|---|---|---|---|
| Dec 12–13, 2020 | (Italy) 2021 Italian Championships | 4 | 57.88 | 4 | 104.84 | 4 | 162.72 |

Results in the 2022–23 season
| Date | Event | SP | | FS | | Total | |
| Date | Event | P | Score | P | Score | P | Score |
|---|---|---|---|---|---|---|---|
| Sep 13–16, 2022 | (United States) 2022 CS U.S. International Classic | 8 | 49.06 | 9 | 84.42 | 8 | 133.48 |
| Nov 17–20, 2022 | (Poland) 2022 CS Warsaw Cup | 19 | 45.77 | 21 | 72.81 | 21 | 118.58 |
| Dec 15–18, 2022 | (Italy) 2023 Italian Championships | 7 | 40.23 | 6 | 85.85 | 7 | 126.08 |

==== Junior level ====
Results in the 2015–16 season
| Date | Event | SP | | FS | | Total | |
| Date | Event | P | Score | P | Score | P | Score |
|---|---|---|---|---|---|---|---|
| Dec 16–19, 2015 | (Italy) 2016 Italian Championships | 1 | 44.19 | 2 | 81.27 | 2 | 125.46 |

Results in the 2016–17 season
| Date | Event | SP | | FS | | Total | |
| Date | Event | P | Score | P | Score | P | Score |
|---|---|---|---|---|---|---|---|
| Dec 14–17, 2016 | (Italy) 2017 Italian Championships | 2 | 56.83 | 3 | 94.98 | 2 | 151.81 |

Results in the 2017–18 season
| Date | Event | SP | | FS | | Total | |
| Date | Event | P | Score | P | Score | P | Score |
|---|---|---|---|---|---|---|---|
| Aug 30 – Sep 2, 2017 | 2017 JGP Austria | 12 | 45.88 | 13 | 78.63 | 14 | 124.51 |
| Oct 11–15, 2017 | (France) 2017 International Cup of Nice | 3 | 52.23 | 3 | 94.16 | 3 | 146.39 |
| Nov 8–12, 2017 | (Austria) 2017 Ice Challenge | 1 | 47.77 | 1 | 91.39 | 1 | 139.16 |
| Nov 15–19, 2017 | (Italy) 2017 Merano Cup | 2 | 50.25 | 6 | 76.79 | 6 | 127.04 |
| Dec 13–16, 2017 | (Italy) 2018 Italian Championships | 3 | 54.02 | 4 | 91.50 | 4 | 145.52 |
| Feb 6–11, 2018 | (Bulgaria) 2018 Sofia Trophy | 2 | 51.28 | 2 | 95.69 | 2 | 143.97 |
| Feb 17–18, 2018 | (Hungary) 2018 Jégvirág Cup | 1 | 49.64 | 5 | 79.13 | 3 | 128.77 |
| Mar 16–18, 2018 | (Luxembourg) 2018 Coupe du Printemps | 2 | 50.46 | 4 | 85.66 | 2 | 136.12 |
| Apr 4–8, 2018 | (Italy) 2018 Egna Spring Trophy | 5 | 46.05 | 1 | 97.51 | 3 | 143.56 |

Results in the 2018–19 season
| Date | Event | SP | | FS | | Total | |
| Date | Event | P | Score | P | Score | P | Score |
|---|---|---|---|---|---|---|---|
| Aug 22–25, 2018 | 2018 JGP Slovakia | 14 | 46.24 | 16 | 80.30 | 14 | 126.54 |
| Oct 25–28, 2018 | (Croatia) 2018 Golden Bear of Zagreb | 5 | 55.36 | 5 | 99.77 | 6 | 155.13 |
| Nov 12–18, 2018 | (Austria) 2018 Alpen Trophy | 3 | 49.07 | 2 | 96.62 | 2 | 145.69 |
| Nov 29 – Dec 2, 2018 | (Hungary) 2018 Christmas Cup | 2 | 55.80 | 2 | 102.13 | 2 | 157.93 |
| Jan 17–19, 2019 | (Serbia) 2019 Skate Helena | 2 | 50.07 | 4 | 91.42 | 3 | 141.49 |
| Feb 5–10, 2019 | (Bulgaria) 2019 Sofia Trophy | 2 | 55.19 | 1 | 98.96 | 1 | 154.45 |
| Mar 2–3, 2019 | (Austria) 2019 Cup of Tyrol | 1 | 51.21 | 1 | 98.84 | 1 | 150.05 |
| Mar 28–31, 2018 | (Italy) 2019 Egna Spring Trophy | 5 | 48.93 | 2 | 104.75 | 2 | 153.68 |

Results in the 2019–20 season
| Date | Event | SP | | FS | | Total | |
| Date | Event | P | Score | P | Score | P | Score |
|---|---|---|---|---|---|---|---|
| Sep 25–28, 2019 | 2019 JGP Croatia | 14 | 45.42 | 5 | 103.44 | 9 | 148.86 |
| Oct 2–5, 2019 | 2019 JGP Italy | 7 | 56.67 | 2 | 119.26 | 3 | 175.93 |
| Jan 11–13, 2020 | (Switzerland) 2020 Winter Youth Olympics | 6 | 62.19 | 5 | 116.41 | 6 | 178.60 |
| Jan 15, 2020 | (Switzerland) 2020 Winter Youth Olympics (Team event) | – | – | 3 | 125.22 | 5 | – |
| Mar 2–8, 2020 | (Estonia) 2020 World Junior Championships | 14 | 57.08 | 12 | 106.37 | 13 | 163.45 |
