= Bernardis =

Bernardis is a surname. Notable people with the surname include:

- Robert Bernardis (1908–1944), Austrian resistance fighter
- Stéphane Bernardis (born 1974), French pair skater

== See also ==
- Edoardo De Bernardis (born 1978), Italian figure skating coach and choreographer
