= Tomàs Guarino =

Spanish figure skater (born 1999)

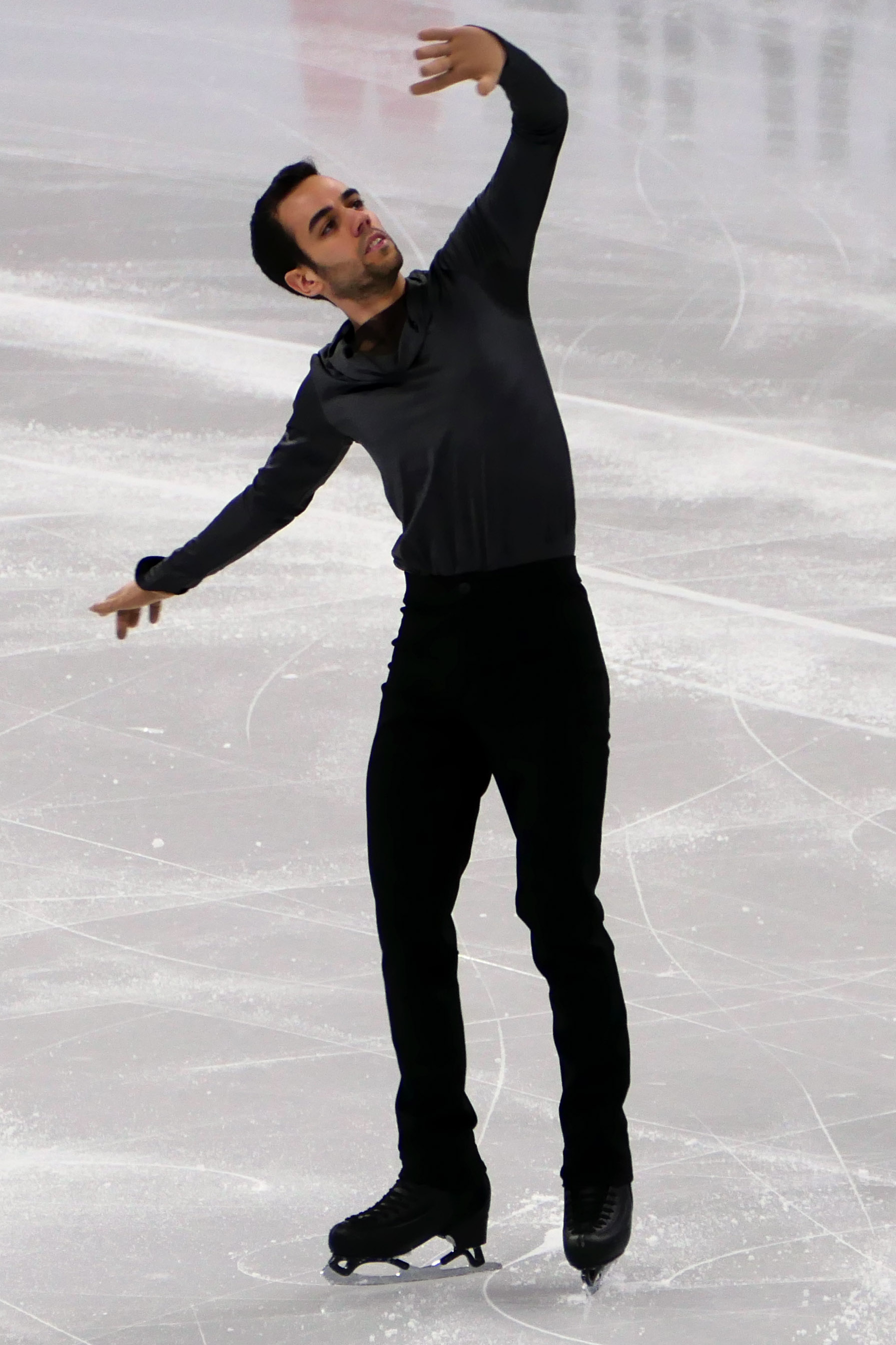
- Tomàs-Llorenç Guarino Sabaté at the 2024 World Championships

Personal information
- Born: 5 July 1999 (age 27) Barcelona, Spain
- Home town: Turin, Italy
- Height: 1.78 m (5 ft 10 in)

Figure skating career
- Country: Spain (until 2016, since 2020); Switzerland (2016–2020)
- Discipline: Men's singles
- Coach: Edoardo De Bernardis; Renata Lazzaroni; Luca Mantovani
- Skating club: Ice club Torino
- Began skating: 2007

Medal record
Representing Spain
Spanish Championships
Gold medal – first place	2021 Valdemoro	Singles
Gold medal – first place	2022 Jaca	Singles
Gold medal – first place	2023 Madrid	Singles
Gold medal – first place	2024 Logroño	Singles
Gold medal – first place	2025 Logroño	Singles
Gold medal – first place	2026 Jaca	Singles
Representing Switzerland
Swiss Championships
Bronze medal – third place	2019 Wetzikon	Singles

Tomàs-Llorenç Guarino Sabaté (born 5 July 1999) is a Spanish figure skater. He is the 2021 Open d'Andorra champion, the 2025 Merano Ice Trophy champion, and a six-time Spanish national champion (2021–26).

He represented Spain at the 2026 Winter Olympics.

== Personal life ==
Guarino Sabaté was born 5 July 1999 in Barcelona. He began studying at International University of La Rioja in January 2021.

== Career ==
=== Early years ===
Guarino began learning to skate in 2007. As an advanced novice, he competed internationally for Spain and won the national title in that category in December 2014. The following season, he moved up to the junior ranks and represented Spain at two events, in September and November 2015.

=== Career for Switzerland ===
Deciding to represent Switzerland, Guarino debuted for his new country in November 2016 at the NRW Trophy in Germany. As a junior, he competed three seasons for Switzerland, appearing at two ISU Junior Grand Prix events. In December 2018, he became the Swiss national bronze medalist in the senior men's category. He trained in La Chaux-de-Fonds, coached by Bernard Glesser (2017–18 season) and by Jean-François Ballester (2018–19 season).

Guarino made his senior international debut in October 2019, placing 16th at the 2019 CS Finlandia Trophy. In November, he won bronze at the Open d'Andorra. It was his final international appearance for Switzerland. The following month, he finished fourth at the Swiss Championships.

=== 2020–21 season: Debut for Spain ===
After not competing in 2020, Guarino resumed his career for Spain in February 2021 at the International Challenge Cup in the Netherlands. He won the Spanish national title in March and took bronze at the Egna Spring Trophy in April.

=== 2021–22 season ===
In September, Guarino placed sixteenth at the 2021 CS Nebelhorn Trophy, an Olympic qualifying event. He won gold at the Open d'Andorra in November and then his second national title in December. He was subsequently selected to compete at his first ISU Championship, the 2022 European Championships in Tallinn, Estonia, where he qualified to the free skate and finished in twenty-second place. To end the season, he was twenty-first at the 2022 World Championships.

=== 2022–23 season ===
Beginning the new season at the Nebelhorn Trophy again, Guarino came fifth. At two other Challenger events, he was sixth at the 2022 CS Budapest Trophy and fourth at the 2022 CS Ice Challenge. Guarino was fifth at the Santa Claus Cup, before winning a third Spanish national title.

Guarino finished fourteenth at the 2023 Winter World University Games, twelfth at the 2023 European Championships, and twenty-seventh at the 2023 World Championships.

Tomas decided to leave the Young Goose Academy where he was training, and moved to Torino to train with Edoardo De Bernardis at the Ice Club Torino.

=== 2023–24 season ===
Guarino began the season by competing on the 2023–24 ISU Challenger Series, finishing twelfth at the 2023 CS Autumn Classic International and eighth at the 2023 CS Budapest Trophy. He then went on to take silver at the 2023 Volvo Open Cup and gold at the 2023 NRW Trophy.

In December, Guarino won his fourth national title at the 2023–24 Spanish Championships. Selected to compete at the 2024 European Championships in Kaunas, Lithuania, he finished eighteenth. Two months later, he would finish twenty-eighth at the 2024 World Championships in Montreal, Quebec, Canada.

=== 2024–25 season ===
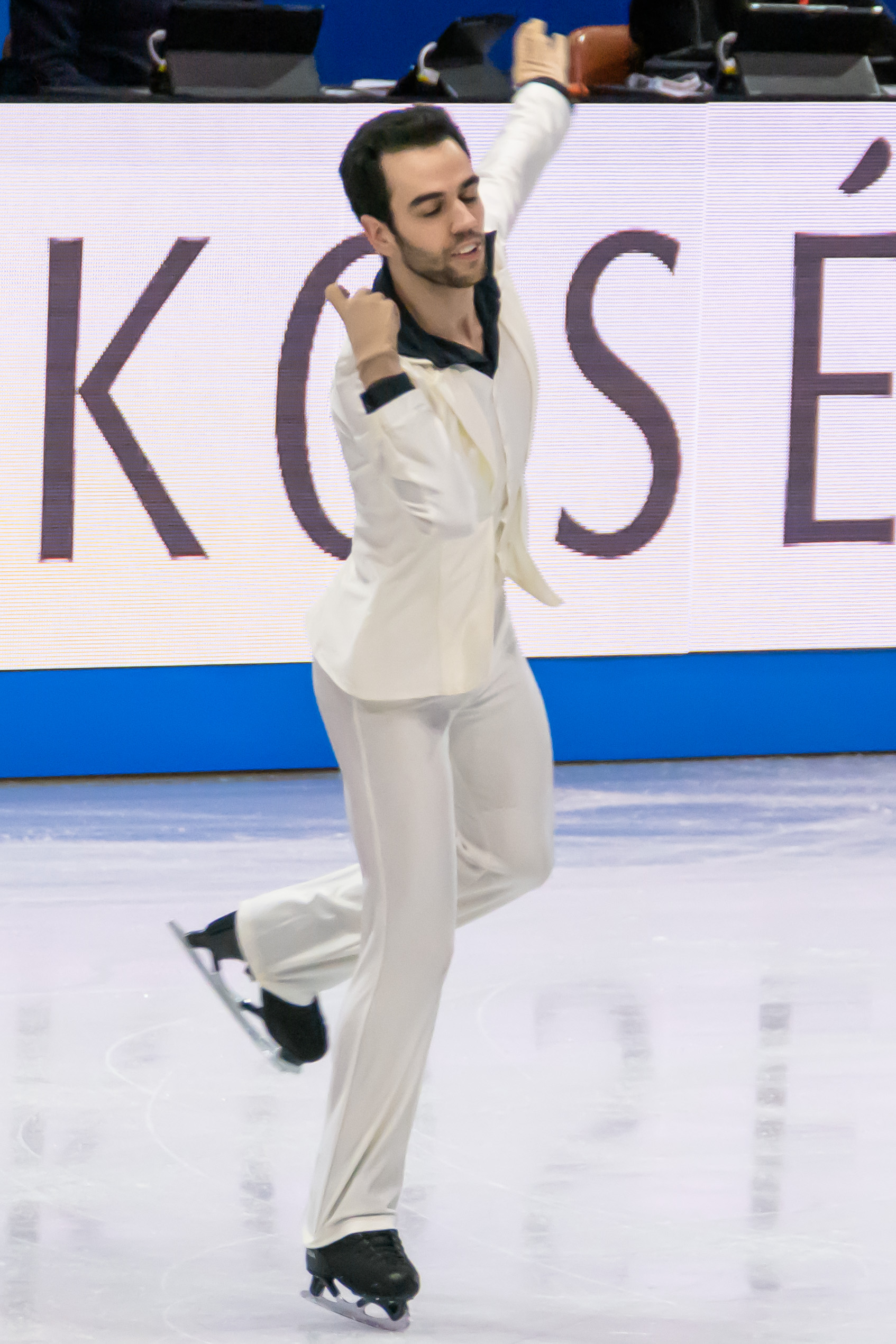
Guarino at the 2025 World Championships

Guarino Sabaté started the season by winning bronze at the 2024 Tayside Trophy. Going on to compete on the 2024–25 ISU Challenger Series, he finished fifth at the 2024 CS Nepela Memorial and tenth at the 2024 CS Tallinn Trophy. In December, Guarino won his fifth consecutive national title at the 2025 Spanish Championships.

Going on to compete at the 2025 European Championships in Tallinn, Estonia, Guarino Sabaté finished the event in nineteenth place overall. He followed this up by winning the 2025 Merano Ice Trophy.

In March, Guarino finished twentieth at the 2025 World Championships in Boston, Massachusetts, United States. His placement won Spain a quota for men's singles skating at the 2026 Winter Olympics.

=== 2025–26 season: Milano Cortina Olympics ===
Guarino opened his season by finishing twelfth at the 2025 CS Nepela Memorial. He followed this up by finishing fourth at the 2025 Golden Bear of Zagreb, winning silver at the 2025 NRW Trophy, and placing ninth at the 2025 CS Tallinn Trophy.

In December, he won his sixth consecutive national title at the 2026 Spanish Championships. The following month, he competed at the 2026 European Championships in Sheffield, England, United Kingdom, finishing in eighteenth place.

In early February, days before the start of the 2026 Winter Olympics, Guarino announced via his Instagram that despite having skated to it for the entirety of the season, he would be unable to use his Minions short program at the event due to Universal Pictures not allowing it. "Unfortunately, just days before the Olympic inauguration, I was informed that I am no longer permitted to use this program due to copyright clearance issues," he shared. "Finding this out last Friday, so close to the biggest competition of my life, was incredibly disappointing. Nevertheless, I will face this challenge head-on and do everything I can to make the best of the situation." The day after making his post, Guariano announced that Universal Pictures had reconsidered and granted him the rights to perform his Minions program due to widespread fan support leading to his post going viral. Going on to compete at the 2026 Olympic Games, Guarino finished twenty-fifth in the short program, just 2.5 points shy of qualifying for the final. He closed his season at the 2026 World Figure Skating Championships in Prague, finishing 29th.

== Programs ==
Season	Short program	Free skate	Exhibition	Ref.
2017–18	L.O.V.E. (Get Happy)	Dans la maison by Philippe Rombi	—N/a	
2018–19	Art on Ice by Edvin Marton; Piano Concerto No. 1 by Pyotr Ilyich Tchaikovsky arranged by Edvin Marton choreo. by Lorenzo Magri	Tango by Edvin Marton choreo. by Lorenzo Magri	—N/a	
2019–20	Art on Ice; Tchaikovsky Remix by Edvin Marton choreo. by Lorenzo Magri	Ange et diable by Maxime Rodriguez choreo. by Lorenzo Magri	—N/a	
2020–21	A Day in the Life by Jeff Beck choreo. by Benoît Richaud	Ange et diable by Maxime Rodriguez choreo. by Lorenzo Magri	—N/a	
2021–22	A Day in the Life by Jeff Beck choreo. by Benoît Richaud	Sarabande by George Frideric Handel, performed by; Angèle Dubeau & La Pietà; City of Prague Philharmonic Orchestra; Globus choreo. by Benoît Richaud	—N/a	
2022–23	St. James Infirmary Blues by Mario Pezzotta Orchestra; Happy by C2C both arranged by Cedric Tour choreo. by Benoît Richaud	Sarabande by George Frideric Handel, performed by; Angèle Dubeau & La Pietà; City of Prague Philharmonic Orchestra; Globus choreo. by Benoît Richaud	España cañí by Pascual Marquina Narro; La Bomba by King África	
2023–24	St. James Infirmary Blues by Mario Pezzotta Orchestra; Happy by C2C both arranged by Cedric Tour choreo. by Benoît Richaud	Return to the Cabin; See You Around (from Cowboys & Aliens) by Harry Gregson-Williams; Powershifter by Baptiste Thiry; The Ecstasy of Gold (from The Good, the Bad and the Ugly) by Il Volo, Ennio Morricone; Guns Go Bang by Kid Cudi, Jay-Z; Cotton Eye Joe by Rednex all arranged by Cédric Tour choreo. by Benoît Richaud	Minions by Heitor Pereira	
2024–25	Stayin' Alive (Serban Mix); How Deep Is Your Love (Serban Mix); You Should Be Dancing (Serban Mix) by Bee Gees arranged by Cédric Tour choreo. by Benoît Richaud	Return to the Cabin; See You Around (from Cowboys & Aliens) by Harry Gregson-Williams; Powershifter by Baptiste Thiry; The Ecstasy of Gold (from The Good, the Bad and the Ugly) by Il Volo, Ennio Morricone; Guns Go Bang by Kid Cudi, Jay-Z; Cotton Eye Joe by Rednex all arranged by Cédric Tour choreo. by Benoît Richaud		
2025–26	Universal fanfare (from Minions); Vicious Funk by Heitor Pereira; Freedom by Pharrell Williams; Papaya (Minions Remix) by The Funny Minions choreo. by Benoît Richaud	Stayin' Alive (Serban Mix); How Deep Is Your Love (Serban Mix); You Should Be Dancing (Serban Mix) by Bee Gees arranged by Cédric Tour choreo. by Benoît Richaud		

== Competitive highlights ==
- JGP – Event of the ISU Junior Grand Prix Series
- CS – Event of the ISU Challenger Series
- TBD – Assigned
- WD – Withdrew from competition

=== Single skating (for Spain) ===
Competition placements at senior level
Season	2020–21	2021–22	2022–23	2023–24	2024–25	2025–26
Winter Olympics						25th
World Championships		21st	27th	28th	20th	29th
European Championships		22nd	12th	18th	19th	18th
Spanish Championships	1st	1st	1st	1st	1st	1st
CS Autumn Classic				12th		
CS Budapest Trophy			6th	8th		
CS Finlandia Trophy		9th				
CS Ice Challenge			4th			
CS Lombardia Trophy		15th				
CS Nebelhorn Trophy		16th	5th			
CS Nepela Memorial					5th	12th
CS Tallinn Trophy					10th	9th
Challenge Cup	8th	9th	15th			
Egna Spring Trophy	3rd					
Golden Bear of Zagreb						4th
Merano Ice Trophy					1st	
NRW Trophy		5th		1st		2nd
Open d'Andorra		1st				
Santa Claus Cup			5th		5th	
Tayside Trophy					3rd	
Volvo Open Cup				2nd		
World University Games			14th			

=== Single skating (for Switzerland) ===
Competition placements at senior level
Season	2017–18	2018–19	2019–20
Swiss Championships	5th	3rd	4th
CS Finlandia Trophy			16th
Golden Bear of Zagreb			9th
Open d'Andorra			3rd
Prague Ice Cup			4th

Competition placements at junior level
Season	2016–17	2017–18	2018–19
Swiss Championships	2nd		
JGP Italy		21st	
JGP Slovakia			16th
Alpen Trophy			5th
Bavarian Open		8th	7th
Coupe du Printemps		6th	
Cup of Tyrol		5th	
Egna Spring Trophy	4th		
Golden Bear of Zagreb			4th
Merano Cup		3rd	
NRW Trophy	12th		
Tallinn Trophy			2nd

== Detailed results ==
=== Single skating (for Spain) ===
ISU personal best scores in the +5/-5 GOE System
Segment	Type	Score	Event
Total	TSS	217.48	2025 World Championships
Short program	TSS	74.89	2025 World Championships
Short program	TES	39.06	2025 World Championships
Short program	PCS	37.17	2025 CS Nepela Memorial
Free skating	TSS	142.59	2025 World Championships
Free skating	TES	71.15	2024 CS Nepela Memorial
Free skating	PCS	74.23	2025 World Championships

Results in the 2024–25 season
Date	Event	SP		FS		Total	
Date	Event	P	Score	P	Score	P	Score
Oct 12–13, 2024	(United Kingdom) 2024 Tayside Trophy	2	67.03	3	125.20	3	192.23
Oct 25–27, 2024	(Slovakia) 2024 CS Nepela Memorial	6	73.93	5	142.41	5	216.34
Nov 11–17, 2024	(Estonia) 2024 CS Tallinn Trophy	7	69.64	7	132.91	10	202.55
Dec 12–15, 2024	(Spain) 2025 Spanish Championships	1	86.70	1	158.72	1	245.42
Jan 28 – Feb 2, 2025	(Estonia) 2025 European Championships	21	67.66	19	122.57	19	190.23
Feb 13–16, 2025	(Italy) 2025 Merano Ice Trophy	3	72.27	1	142.87	7	215.14
Mar 24–30, 2025	(United States) 2025 World Championships	22	74.89	20	142.59	20	217.48

Results in the 2025–26 season
Date	Event	SP		FS		Total	
Date	Event	P	Score	P	Score	P	Score
Sep 25–27, 2025	(Slovakia) 2025 CS Nepela Memorial	12	71.65	11	137.04	12	208.69
Oct 24–27, 2025	(Croatia) 2025 Golden Bear of Zagreb	4	62.96	4	106.70	4	169.66
Nov 13–16, 2025	(Germany) 2025 NRW Trophy	1	78.72	3	143.29	2	222.01
Nov 25–30, 2025	(Estonia) 2025 CS Tallinn Trophy	0	67.96	8	137.73	9	205.69
Dec 11–14, 2025	(Spain) 2026 Spanish Championships	1	75.66	1	151.95	1	227.61
Jan 13–18, 2026	(United Kingdom) 2026 European Championships	17	67.94	19	127.48	18	195.42
Feb 10–13, 2026	(Italy) 2026 Winter Olympics	25	69.80	—N/a	—N/a	25	69.80
Mar 24–29, 2026	(Czech Republic) 2026 World Championships	29	69.12	—N/a	—N/a	29	69.12
