= 2019 CS Warsaw Cup =

Figure skating competition

- Type: ISU Challenger Series
- Date: November 14 – 17
- Season: 2019–20
- Location: Warsaw, Poland
- Host: Polish Figure Skating Association
- Venue: Arena COS Torwar

Champions
- Men's singles: (Russia) Andrei Mozalev
- Ladies' singles: (Poland) Ekaterina Kurakova
- Pairs: (United States) Jessica Calalang / Brian Johnson
- Ice dance: (France) Marie-Jade Lauriault / Romain Le Gac
- Previous: 2018 Warsaw Cup
- Next: 2021 CS Warsaw Cup
- Previous CS: 2019 CS Asian Open Trophy
- Next CS: 2019 CS Golden Spin of Zagreb

The 2019 CS Warsaw Cup was held in November 2019 in Warsaw, Poland. It was part of the 2019–20 ISU Challenger Series. Medals were awarded in the disciplines of men's singles, ladies' singles, pair skating, and ice dance.

== Entries ==
The International Skating Union published the full list of entries on October 14, 2019.

Country	Men	Ladies	Pairs	Ice dance
Armenia				Tina Garabedian / Simon Proulx-Sénécal
Australia	Jordan Dodds			Holly Harris / Jason Chan; Chantelle Kerry / Andrew Dodds; India Nette / Eron Westwood
Austria		Lara Roth		
Belarus	Alexander Lebedev; Yakau Zenko	Katsiarina Pakhamovich; Viktoriia Safonova		
Canada	Joseph Phan	Emily Bausback; Alison Schumacher	Justine Brasseur / Mark Bardei; Lori-Ann Matte / Thierry Ferland; Nadine Wang / Francis Boudreau-Audet	Alicia Fabbri / Paul Ayer
China				Ren Junfei / Alexey Karpushov
Chinese Taipei	Micah Tang	Jenny Shyu		
Czech Republic	Filip Scerba	Nikola Rychtarikova; Klara Stepanova		
Denmark				Raffaella Adele Koncius / Rafael Marc Drozd Musil
Estonia	Daniel Albert Naurits	Gerli Liinamäe; Kristina Shkuleta-Gromova		
Finland	Roman Galay; Valtter Virtanen	Jenni Saarinen		
France	Luc Economides; Yann Frechon; Philip Warren	Adriana Cagnon	Cléo Hamon / Denys Strekalin; Coline Keriven / Antoine Pierre; Camille Mendoza / Pavel Kovalev	Marie-Jade Lauriault / Romain Le Gac; Evgeniia Lopareva / Geoffrey Brissaud; Lila-Maya Seclet Monchot / Renan Manceau
Germany	Catalin Dimitrescu; Paul Fentz; Jonathan Hess	Kristina Isaev	Annika Hocke / Robert Kunkel; Elena Pavlova / Ruben Blommaert	
Hungary		Ivett Tóth		
Italy	Gabriele Frangipani	Lucrezia Beccari; Marina Piredda; Alessia Tornaghi	Irma Caldara / Marco Santucci; Vivienne Contarino / Marco Pauletti; Sara Conti / Niccolò Macii	
Kazakhstan		Veronika Sheveleva		
Latvia		Angelīna Kučvaļska		
Netherlands			Daria Danilova / Michel Tsiba	
Philippines		Alisson Krystle Perticheto	Isabella Gamez / David-Alexandre Paradis	
Poland	Krzysztof Gała	Ekaterina Kurakova; Agnieszka Rejment; Yelyzaveta Surova		Jenna Hertenstein / Damian Binkowski; Justyna Plutowska / Jérémie Flemin
Russia	Petr Gumennik; Andrei Mozalev; Egor Murashov	Elizaveta Nugumanova; Serafima Sakhanovich	Alina Pepeleva / Roman Pleshkov	Ksenia Konkina / Pavel Drozd
South Korea	Lee June-hyoung	Choi Da-bin; Sara Hong; To Ji-hun		
Spain	Aleix Gabara	Valentina Matos	Laura Barquero / Tòn Cónsul; Dorota Broda / Pedro Betegnon Martin	
Sweden	Nikolaj Majorov	Matilda Algotsson; Anita Östlund		
Switzerland	Lukas Britschgi; Nurullah Sahaka	Shaline Ruegger	Alexandra Herbríková / Nicolas Roulet	Victoria Manni / Carlo Roethlisberger
Ukraine				Darya Popova / Volodymyr Byelikov
United Kingdom			Zoe Jones / Christopher Boyadji	
United States		Bradie Tennell	Jessica Calalang / Brian Johnson; Nica Digerness / Danny Neudecker	Caroline Green / Michael Parsons

=== Changes to preliminary assignments ===
Date	Discipline	Withdrew	Added	Reason/Other notes	Refs
October 15	Ladies	(Australia) Kailani Craine			
October 15	Ladies	(Finland) Emmi Peltonen		Event conflict	
October 15	Ice dance	(Russia) Sofia Evdokimova / Egor Bazin	(Russia) Sofia Shevchenko / Igor Eremenko		
October 18	Ladies	(Italy) Roberta Rodeghiero			
October 21	Ladies	(Austria) Sophia Schaller			
October 21	Ladies	(Greece) Dimitra Korri			
October 22	Pairs	N/A	(United Kingdom) Zoe Jones / Christopher Boyadji		
October 23	Ladies	(Lithuania) Aleksandra Golovkina	(Italy) Lucrezia Beccari		
October 23	Ladies	(Lithuania) Elžbieta Kropa			
October 23	Ladies	(Lithuania) Greta Morkytė			
October 23	Pairs	N/A	(Croatia) Lana Petranović / Antonio Souza-Kordeiru		
October 24	Ice dance	(Russia) Sofia Shevchenko / Igor Eremenko			
October 31	Men	(Australia) Andrew Dodds			
October 31	Men	(Georgia (country)) Irakli Maysuradze			
October 31	Ladies	(Czech Republic) Eliška Březinová	(Belarus) Katsiarina Pakhamovich		
October 31	Pairs	(Czech Republic) Anna Dušková / Radek Jakubka			
October 31	Ice dance	(Russia) Annabelle Morozov / Andrei Bagin	(Australia) Holly Harris / Jason Chan		
November 4	Ladies	(Canada) Aurora Cotop		Injury	
November 4	Ladies	(Georgia (country)) Alina Urushadze			
November 4	Ice dance	(Spain) Olivia Smart / Adrián Díaz			
November 5	Ladies	(Germany) Nathalie Weinzierl			
November 7	Men	(Poland) Kornel Witkowski			
November 7	Ladies	(Poland) Elżbieta Gabryszak	(Poland) Agnieszka Rejment		
November 7	Pairs	(Croatia) Lana Petranović / Antonio Souza-Kordeiru			
November 7	Ice dance	(Italy) Charlène Guignard / Marco Fabbri			
November 8	Men	(Spain) Hector Alonso Serrano			
November 8	Ladies	(Spain) Belen Alvarez			
November 11	Men	(Hungary) Alexander Maszljanko			
November 11	Ladies	(Germany) Nicole Schott		Event conflict	
November 11	Pairs	(Australia) Ekaterina Alexandrovskaya / Harley Windsor			
November 12	Men	(Israel) Daniel Samohin		Event conflict	
November 12	Men	(Poland) Miłosz Witkowski			
November 12	Ladies	(Israel) Alina Iushchenkova			
November 12	Ladies	(Israel) Alina Soupian			
November 12	Pairs	(Israel) Anna Vernikov / Evgeni Krasnopolski			
November 13	Men	(Italy) Daniel Grassl			
November 13	Ladies	(Switzerland) Yasmine Kimiko Yamada			

== Results ==
=== Men ===
Rank	Name	Nation	Total points	SP		FS	
1	Andrei Mozalev	Russia	223.25	1	83.81	1	139.44
2	Petr Gumennik	Russia	214.24	2	79.41	3	134.83
3	Lee June-hyoung	South Korea	205.20	8	66.03	2	139.17
4	Gabriele Frangipani	Italy	202.96	3	70.14	4	132.82
5	Joseph Phan	Canada	198.80	4	68.81	5	129.99
6	Lukas Britschgi	Switzerland	189.43	7	66.60	7	122.83
7	Roman Galay	Finland	185.90	5	67.93	11	117.97
8	Daniel Albert Naurits	Estonia	185.39	6	67.08	10	118.31
9	Philip Warren	France	183.37	11	64.46	9	118.91
10	Egor Murashov	Russia	182.49	9	65.76	12	116.73
11	Nikolaj Majorov	Sweden	182.40	19	55.82	6	126.58
12	Paul Fentz	Germany	177.86	10	65.11	14	112.75
13	Nurullah Sahaka	Switzerland	174.71	21	54.69	8	120.02
14	Yakau Zenko	Belarus	173.75	15	59.50	13	114.25
15	Luc Economides	France	170.14	14	59.87	15	110.27
16	Valtter Virtanen	Finland	170.09	13	60.22	16	109.87
17	Catalin Dimitrescu	Germany	168.59	16	59.39	17	109.20
18	Jonathan Hess	Germany	167.27	12	62.22	18	105.05
19	Alexander Lebedev	Belarus	158.39	20	54.96	19	103.43
20	Aleix Gabara	Spain	153.29	25	51.87	20	101.42
21	Filip Scerba	Czech Republic	152.33	22	53.83	22	98.50
22	Yann Frechon	France	152.22	23	53.30	21	98.92
23	Jordan Dodds	Australia	146.24	17	58.80	23	87.44
24	Micah Tang	Chinese Taipei	141.40	18	56.82	24	84.58
25	Krzysztof Gała	Poland	127.35	24	52.02	25	75.33

=== Ladies ===
Rank	Name	Nation	Total points	SP		FS	
1	Ekaterina Kurakova	Poland	201.47	2	66.08	1	135.39
2	Bradie Tennell	United States	189.01	1	70.10	5	118.91
3	Elizaveta Nugumanova	Russia	186.02	3	64.37	4	121.65
4	Serafima Sakhanovich	Russia	178.27	6	56.62	3	121.65
5	Alessia Tornaghi	Italy	172.66	13	50.31	2	122.35
6	Emily Bausback	Canada	172.48	9	55.29	6	117.19
7	Viktoriia Safonova	Belarus	171.43	7	55.55	7	115.88
8	Alison Schumacher	Canada	169.98	5	56.78	8	113.20
9	To Ji-hun	South Korea	167.66	4	59.61	9	108.05
10	Jenni Saarinen	Finland	160.64	8	55.37	12	105.27
11	Lucrezia Beccari	Italy	160.21	11	54.36	10	105.85
12	Choi Da-bin	South Korea	152.68	10	54.89	14	97.79
13	Ivett Tóth	Hungary	152.58	18	47.25	11	105.33
14	Matilda Algotsson	Sweden	148.76	12	51.27	15	97.49
15	Gerli Liinamäe	Estonia	148.13	21	44.75	13	103.38
16	Alisson Krystle Perticheto	Philippines	139.70	19	46.50	16	93.20
17	Kristina Isaev	Germany	135.23	16	48.80	19	86.43
18	Marina Piredda	Italy	132.77	23	42.72	17	90.05
19	Anita Östlund	Sweden	129.35	14	49.79	23	79.56
20	Kristina Shkuleta-Gromova	Estonia	128.40	15	48.94	24	79.46
21	Klara Stepanova	Czech Republic	128.23	17	47.57	22	80.66
22	Shaline Ruegger	Switzerland	127.36	30	38.10	18	89.26
23	Adriana Cagnon	France	126.92	27	41.32	20	85.60
24	Valentina Matos	Spain	125.52	24	42.59	21	82.93
25	Lara Roth	Austria	124.00	20	45.52	25	78.48
26	Jenny Shyu	Chinese Taipei	120.94	22	44.70	26	76.24
27	Katsiarina Pakhamovich	Belarus	118.56	25	42.33	27	76.23
28	Nikola Rychtarikova	Czech Republic	117.69	26	42.21	28	75.48
29	Yelyzaveta Surova	Poland	106.35	28	39.83	29	66.52
30	Agnieszka Rejment	Poland	89.18	32	28.17	30	61.01
31	Veronika Sheveleva	Kazakhstan	85.67	31	30.26	31	55.41
WD	Sara Hong	South Korea	withdrew	29	39.27	withdrew from competition	
WD	Angelīna Kučvaļska	Latvia	withdrew	withdrew from competition			

=== Pairs ===
Rank	Name	Nation	Total points	SP		FS	
1	Jessica Calalang / Brian Johnson	United States	191.46	1	68.20	1	123.26
2	Alina Pepeleva / Roman Pleshkov	Russia	188.79	2	67.06	2	121.73
3	Justine Brasseur / Mark Bardei	Canada	172.21	4	57.67	3	114.54
4	Laura Barquero / Tòn Cónsul	Spain	159.96	6	54.30	4	105.66
5	Elena Pavlova / Ruben Blommaert	Germany	155.97	11	51.38	5	104.59
6	Annika Hocke / Robert Kunkel	Germany	153.47	3	58.05	9	95.42
7	Lori-Ann Matte / Thierry Ferland	Canada	152.53	10	51.65	6	100.88
8	Coline Keriven / Antoine Pierre	France	152.12	9	52.46	7	99.66
9	Nadine Wang / Francis Boudreau-Audet	Canada	147.45	7	54.19	10	93.26
10	Cléo Hamon / Denys Strekalin	France	146.01	5	57.35	12	88.66
11	Isabella Gamez / David-Alexandre Paradis	Philippines	145.04	12	47.99	8	97.05
12	Zoe Jones / Christopher Boyadji	United Kingdom	144.49	8	52.57	11	91.92
13	Camille Mendoza / Pavel Kovalev	France	135.44	13	47.70	13	87.74
14	Nica Digerness / Danny Neudecker	United States	134.43	14	47.49	14	86.94
15	Sara Conti / Niccolò Macii	Italy	128.63	16	43.32	15	85.31
16	Vivienne Contarino / Marco Pauletti	Italy	128.58	15	43.64	16	84.94
17	Daria Danilova / Michel Tsiba	Netherlands	119.44	18	38.90	18	80.54
18	Dorota Broda / Pedro Betegon Martin	Spain	117.39	17	41.81	19	75.58
19	Alexandra Herbríková / Nicolas Roulet	Switzerland	116.68	20	33.50	17	83.18
20	Irma Caldara / Marco Santucci	Italy	97.41	19	34.50	20	62.91

=== Ice dance ===
Rank	Name	Nation	Total points	RD		FD	
1	Marie-Jade Lauriault / Romain Le Gac	France	185.48	2	71.40	1	114.08
2	Ksenia Konkina / Pavel Drozd	Russia	178.43	1	71.81	2	106.62
3	Caroline Green / Michael Parsons	United States	172.16	3	67.40	3	104.76
4	Evgeniia Lopareva / Geoffrey Brissaud	France	167.28	4	65.83	4	101.45
5	Justyna Plutowska / Jérémie Flemin	Poland	156.49	7	61.60	5	94.89
6	Alicia Fabbri / Paul Ayer	Canada	155.77	6	62.14	6	93.63
7	Darya Popova / Volodymyr Byelikov	Ukraine	153.82	5	63.60	9	90.22
8	Tina Garabedian / Simon Proulx-Sénécal	Armenia	149.38	9	56.41	7	92.97
9	Holly Harris / Jason Chan	Australia	148.48	8	57.92	8	90.56
10	Victoria Manni / Carlo Roethlisberger	Switzerland	129.46	11	51.81	10	77.65
11	Lila-Maya Seclet Monchot / Renan Manceau	France	124.65	12	50.23	11	74.42
12	Chantelle Kerry / Andrew Dodds	Australia	123.96	13	50.05	12	73.91
13	Ren Junfei / Alexey Karpushov	China	120.24	10	52.96	14	67.28
14	Jenna Hertenstein / Damian Binkowski	Poland	113.69	14	46.08	13	67.61
15	Raffaella Adele Konicius / Rafael Marc Drozd Musil	Denmark	90.91	15	36.83	15	54.08
16	India Nette / Eron Westwood	Australia	88.95	16	34.95	16	54.00
