= Marina Piredda =

Italian figure skater (born 2002)

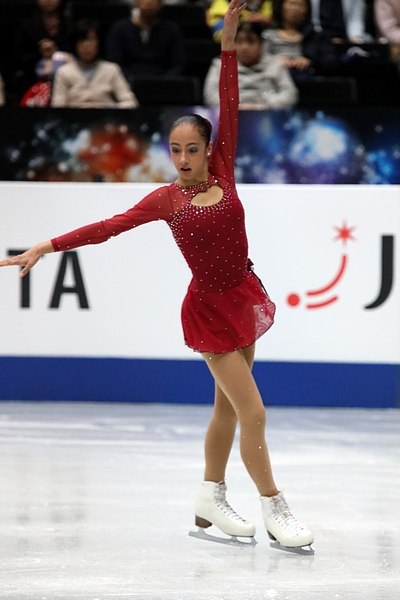
- Piredda at the 2019 World Championships

Personal information
- Born: 28 September 2002 (age 24) Cavalese, Italy
- Height: 1.57 m (5 ft 2 in)

Figure skating career
- Country: Italy
- Discipline: Women's singles
- Coach: Joanna Szczypa
- Skating club: G.S. Fiamme Oro
- Began skating: 2006

Medal record
Italian Championships
Silver medal – second place	2020 Bergamo	Singles
Bronze medal – third place	2022 Turin	Singles
Bronze medal – third place	2025 Varese	Singles

Marina Piredda (born 28 September 2002) is an Italian figure skater. She is a three-time ISU Challenger Series medalist (2 silver, 1 bronze) and three-time Italian national medalist (1 silver, 2 bronze).

At the junior level, she is the 2019 Italian junior national champion.

== Personal life ==
Piredda was born on September 28, 2002.

She currently studies at the University of Verona.

== Career ==
=== Early years ===
Piredda began learning to skate in 2006. She was initially interested in pursuing ice hockey and would ultimately decide to switch to figure skating after being inspired by watching Italian figure skater, Paolo Bacchini, train at her skating rink. Joanna Szczypa would become her coach when she was about five years old.

Making her junior international debut, Piredda won silver at the Cup of Tyrol in February 2017. Continuing in the junior ranks, she took gold at the Dragon Trophy in February 2018 and Egna Trophy in April that same year.

=== 2018–2019 season: Junior Grand Prix and World Championship debut ===
In September, Piredda debuted on the ISU Junior Grand Prix series, placing thirteenth 2018 JGP Canada. She then went on to take gold on the junior level at the 2018 Halloween Cup and silver on the junior level at the 2018 Prague Cup. In December, she won the junior ladies title at the 2019 Italian Championships.

Piredda's senior international debut came in January at the 2019 Toruń Cup. She would then medal at two other senior events, taking bronze at the 2019 Dragon Trophy and the 2019 Cup of Tyrol. She was ultimately selected to represent Italy at the 2019 World Championships in Saitama, Japan. Piredea would place twenty-seventh in the short program, failing to advance to the free skate segment of the competition. She followed this event by winning bronze at the 2019 Egna Spring Trophy.

Piredda was later invited to compete for Team Italy at the 2019 World Team Trophy. At the event, Piredda would score personal bests in all competition segments, finishing seventh in the women's individual event and Team Italy would place sixth overall.

=== 2019–2020 & 2020–21 seasons: Injury ===
Due to a foot injury that required surgery during the summer off-season, Piredda was only able to resume training in the fall. Her first competitions of the season were at the 2019 CS Ice Star and the 2019 CS Warsaw Cup, where she placed seventh and eighteenth, respectively. In December, she competed at the 2020 Italian Championships, where she would win the silver medal.

Shortly following the national championships, Piredda would reinjure her foot due to tissues having not fully healed from her previous surgery. As a result, Piredda was forced to stop training, thus ending her season. She would also miss the entire 2020–21 figure skating season to fully recover from this injury.

=== 2021–2022: Return to competition ===
Piredda made her return to competition in December 2021 at the 2022 Italian Championships, where she captured the bronze medal. She was ultimately selected to compete at the 2022 European Championships in Tallinn, Estonia. At that event, Piredda would skate a solid short program, placing fourteenth in that segment and qualifying for the free skate. However, she would be forced to withdraw before the free program due to testing positive for COVID-19.

She would eventually close her season with a fourth-place finish at the 2022 Egna Spring Trophy.

=== 2022–2023 season ===
Piredda started the season by finishing fourth at the 2023 Italian Championships. Selected to compete at the 2023 Winter World University Games, Piredda finished seventh at the event. She subsequently competed at the 2023 Dragon Trophy where she placed fifth before closing her season by winning gold at the 2023 Maria Olszewska Memorial.

=== 2023–2024 season ===
Piredda opened the season by winning gold at the 2023 EduSport Trophy. Going on to compete at the 2024 Italian Championships, Piredda would finish fourth. She subsequently placed seventh at the 2024 Bavarian Open and won bronze at the 2024 Merano Cup.

She would then finish the season by winning gold at the 2024 Maria Olszewska Memorial and the 2024 Triglav Trophy.

=== 2024–2025 season: First Challenger Series medal ===
Piredda began the season by competing on the 2024–25 ISU Challenger Series, finishing fifth at the 2024 CS Trophée Métropole Nice Côte d'Azur. One month later, she competed at the 2024 CS Warsaw Cup, where she won the bronze medal.

In December, Pirreda took the bronze medal at the 2025 Italian Championships. The following month, she competed at the 2025 Winter World University Games in Turin, Italy, where she finished in eighth place. In February, Piredda won gold at the 2025 Dragon Trophy and finished eighth at the 2025 Road to 26 Trophy. She then closed the season by winning bronze at the 2025 Maria Olszewska Memorial.

=== 2025–26 season ===
Pirreda opened her season in October by finishing seventh at the 2025 Diamond Spin.

In March 2026, Pirreda competed at the Coupe du Printemps held in Kockelscheuer, Luxembourg, where she won bronze overall behind Mana Kawabe and Rinka Watanabe.

=== 2026–27 season ===
Pirreda began her season by winning silver at the 2026 Nebelhorn Trophy.

== Programs ==
Season	Short program	Free skating	Exhibition
2024–2025	Medellín (Offer Nissim Madame X In the Sphinx Mix) by Madonna & Maluma choreo. by Edoardo De Bernardis	The Sea Beyond; Requiem Dal Mare; O Core Mio; Suite Delle Mura; Sonata Dell Incontro Per Pianoforte; Moon by Stefano Lentini choreo. by Edoardo De Bernardis	
2023–2024	S.O.S d'un terrien en detresse by Michel Berger and Luc Plamondon performed by Dimash Qudaibergen choreo. by Edoardo De Bernardis	The Sea Beyond; Requiem Dal Mare; O Core Mio; Suite Delle Mura; Sonata Dell Incontro Per Pianoforte; Moon by Stefano Lentini choreo. by Edoardo De Bernardis	
2022–2023	S.O.S d'un terrien en detresse by Michel Berger and Luc Plamondon performed by Dimash Qudaibergen choreo. by Edoardo De Bernardis	Marche slave by Pyotr Ilyich Tchaikovsky; Djelem Djelem; Lule Lule performed by the Barcelona Gipsy Klezmer Orchestra choreo. by Edoardo De Bernardis	
2021–2022	Wheatfields with Crows; The Yellow House (from Loving Vincent) by Clint Mansell; Concerto in A Minor by Antonio Vivaldi choreo. by Edoardo De Bernardis	Marche slave by Pyotr Ilyich Tchaikovsky; Djelem Djelem; Lule Lule performed by the Barcelona Gipsy Klezmer Orchestra choreo. by Edoardo De Bernardis	
2020–2021	Did not compete in this season		
2019–2020	Wheatfields with Crows; The Yellow House (from Loving Vincent) by Clint Mansell; Concerto in A Minor by Antonio Vivaldi choreo. by Edoardo De Bernardis	Pina; Rooftop by Thomas Heinreich and Sebi Padotzke; The Here and After; Lilies of the Valley; All Names by Jun Miyake choreo. by Francesca Cotogni	
2018–2019	Querer (from Cirque du Soleil) by René Dupéré choreo. by Francesca Cotogni	Pina; Rooftop by Thomas Heinreich and Sebi Padotzke; The Here and After; Lilies of the Valley; All Names by Jun Miyake choreo. by Francesca Cotogni	Grande amore by Francesco Boccia and Ciro Esposito performed by Il Volo
2017–2018	Querer (from Cirque du Soleil) by René Dupéré choreo. by Francesca Cotogni	Notre-Dame de Paris by Riccardo Cocciante	
2016–2017	Querer (from Cirque du Soleil) by René Dupéré choreo. by Francesca Cotogni	Notre-Dame de Paris by Riccardo Cocciante	
2014–2015		Frida by Elliot Goldenthal	

== Competitive highlights ==
- JGP – Event of the ISU Junior Grand Prix Series
- CS – Event of the ISU Challenger Series
- TBD – Assigned
- WD – Withdrew from competition
- Medals at team events are awarded for the team results only. Individual placements at team events are listed in parentheses.

Competition placements at senior level
Season	2018–19	2019–20	2021–22	2022–23	2023–24	2024–25	2025–26	2026–27
World Championships	27th							
European Championships			WD					
Italian Championships		2nd	3rd	4th	4th	3rd	8th	
World Team Trophy	6th (7th)							
CS Golden Spin of Zagreb							4th	
CS Ice Star		7th						
CS Trophée Métropole Nice						5th		
CS Warsaw Cup		18th				3rd	2nd	
CS Nebelhorn Trophy								2nd
CS Budapest Trophy								6th
Cup of Tyrol	3rd							
Denkova-Staviski Cup								TBD
Diamond Spin							7th	
Dragon Trophy	3rd			5th		1st		
Egna Spring Trophy	3rd		4th					
EduSport Trophy					1st			
Maria Olszewska Memorial				1st	1st	3rd		
Mentor Toruń Cup	1st							
Merano Ice Trophy					3rd		1st	
Road to 26 Trophy						8th		
Skate Berlin							1st	
Triglav Trophy					1st	1st		
Winter University Games				7th		8th		
Bavarian Open				1st	7th			
Coupe du Printemps							3rd	

Competition placements at junior level
Season	2016–17	2017–18	2018–19
Italian Championships	5th	3rd	1st
JGP Canada			13th
Bavarian Open		11th	
Cup of Nice		12th	
Cup of Tyrol	2nd		
Dragon Trophy		1st	
Egna Spring Trophy		1st	
Golden Bear of Zagreb		8th	
Halloween Cup			2nd
Merano Cup		11th	
Prague Ice Cup			1st

== Detailed results ==
Small medals for short and free programs awarded only at ISU Championships.

ISU personal best scores in the +5/-5 GOE System
Segment	Type	Score	Event
Total	TSS	180.55	2019 World Team Trophy
Short program	TSS	62.55	2025 CS Warsaw Cup
Short program	TES	35.48	2025 CS Warsaw Cup
Short program	PCS	27.20	2025 CS Goldn Spin of Zagreb
Free skating	TSS	120.22	2019 World Team Trophy
Free skating	TES	64.85	2019 World Team Trophy
Free skating	PCS	58.61	2025 CS Goldn Spin of Zagreb

=== Senior level ===
Results in the 2026–27 season
Date	Event	SP		FS		Total	
Date	Event	P	Score	P	Score	P	Score
Sep 24–26, 2026	(Germany) 2026 Nebelhorn Trophy	5	56.08	2	101.96	2	158.04

Results in the 2025-26 season
Date	Event	SP		FS		Total	
Date	Event	P	Score	P	Score	P	Score
Oct 16-19, 2025	(Poland) 2025 Diamond Spin	4	53.94	8	86.98	7	140.92
Nov 19–23, 2025	(Poland) 2025 CS Warsaw Cup	2	62.55	2	109.50	2	172.05
Dec 3–6, 2025	(Croatia) 2025 CS Golden Spin of Zagreb	6	59.31	4	119.63	4	178.94
Dec 17-20, 2025	(Italy) 2026 Italian Championships	4	60.83	10	86.16	8	146.99
Jan 22-25, 2026	(Italy) 2026 Merano Ice Trophy	1	64.51	1	114.59	1	179.10
Feb 17-21, 2026	(Germany) 2026 Skate Berlin International	1	59.41	2	100.90	1	160.37
Mar 13–15, 2026	(Luxembourg) 2026 Coupe du Printemps	3	53.45	2	98.95	3	152.40

2024–2025 season
Date	Event	SP	FS	Total
March 4–9, 2025	2025 Maria Olszewska Memorial	4; 55.93	3; 110.28	3; 166.21
February 18–20, 2025	2025 Road to 26 Trophy	9; 48.78	7; 105.43	8; 154.21
February 6–9, 2025	2025 Dragon Trophy	1; 57.85	1; 123.75	1; 181.60
January 16–18, 2025	2025 Winter World University Games	24; 40.31	5; 114.15	8; 154.46
December 19–21, 2024	2025 Italian Championships	4; 56.63	3; 113.25	3; 169.88
November 20–24, 2024	2024 CS Warsaw Cup	7; 56.66	4; 112.26	3; 168.92
October 16–20, 2024	2024 CS Trophée Métropole Nice Côte d'Azur	3; 59.73	7; 102.46	5; 162.19
2023–2024 season
Date	Event	SP	FS	Total
April 10–14, 2024	2024 Triglav Trophy	1; 64.82	1; 115.70	1; 180.52
March 6–10, 2024	2024 Maria Olszewska Memorial	2; 51.96	1; 109.17	1; 161.13
February 23–25, 2024	2024 Merano Ice Trophy	1; 60.46	3; 112.20	3; 172.66
January 30–February 4, 2023	2024 Bavarian Open	8; 46.99	8; 95.01	7; 142.00
December 22–23, 2023	2024 Italian Championships	3; 63.09	3; 118.44	4; 181.53
December 6–10, 2023	2023 EduSport Trophy	1; 61.50	1; 111.71	1; 173.21
2022–2023 season
Date	Event	SP	FS	Total
March 15–18, 2023	2023 Maria Olszewska Memorial	1; 61.15	1; 111.46	1; 172.61
February 9–12, 2023	2023 Dragon Trophy	9; 48.72	5; 101.33	5; 150.05
January 31–February 5, 2023	2023 Bavarian Open	1; 57.16	1; 111.80	1; 168.96
January 13–15, 2023	2023 Winter World University Games	15; 52.09	7; 109.36	7; 161.45
December 15–18, 2022	2023 Italian Championships	5; 46.79	2; 110.96	4; 157.75
2021–2022 season
Date	Event	SP	FS	Total
April 7–10, 2022	2022 Egna Spring Trophy	4; 57.20	4; 95.37	4; 152.27
January 10–16, 2022	2022 European Championships	14; 59.53	- WD	- WD
December 4–5, 2021	2022 Italian Championships	3; 60.51	3; 113.16	3; 113.16
2019–2020 season
Date	Event	SP	FS	Total
December 12–15, 2019	2020 Italian Championships	3; 60.16	2; 112.73	2; 172.89
November 14–17, 2019	2019 CS Warsaw Cup	23; 42.72	17; 90.05	18; 132.77
October 18–20, 2019	2019 CS Ice Star	6; 52.25	7; 93.33	7; 145.58
2018–2019 season
Date	Event	SP	FS	Total
April 11–14, 2019	2019 World Team Trophy	9; 60.33	7; 120.22	6T/7P; 180.55
March 28–31, 2019	2019 Egna Trophy	3; 56.45	4; 101.76	3; 158.21
March 18–24, 2019	2019 World Championships	27; 53.27	–	27; 53.27
Feb. 26 – Mar. 3, 2019	2019 Cup of Tyrol	2; 56.43	4; 102.90	3; 159.33
February 7–10, 2019	2019 Dragon Trophy	4; 51.63	3; 107.47	3; 159.10
January 8–13, 2019	2019 Mentor Toruń Cup	1; 53.75	1; 104.92	1; 158.67

=== Junior level ===
2018–2019 season
Date	Event	SP	FS	Total
December 13–16, 2018	2019 Italian Junior Championships	1; 52.42	1; 100.90	1; 153.32
November 9–11, 2018	2018 Prague Riedell Ice Cup	1; 55.09	2; 91.00	1; 146.09
October 19–21, 2018	2018 Halloween Cup	2; 49.96	4; 88.62	2; 138.58
September 12–15, 2018	2018 JGP Canada	15; 40.11	12; 81.66	13; 121.77
2017–2018 season
Date	Event	SP	FS	Total
April 4–8, 2018	2018 Egna Trophy	3; 48.30	2; 96.41	1; 144.71
February 8–11, 2018	2018 Dragon Trophy	2; 47.12	1; 96.35	1; 143.47
January 26–31, 2018	2018 Bavarian Open	13; 43.00	9; 88.20	11; 131.20
December 13–16, 2017	2018 Italian Junior Championships	5; 50.25	2; 98.29	3; 148.54
October 26–29, 2017	2017 Golden Bear of Zagreb	8; 42.49	8; 76.12	8; 118.61
November 15–19, 2017	2017 Merano Cup	8; 42.24	12; 63.47	11; 105.71
October 11–15, 2017	2017 Cup of Nice	5; 48.04	13; 78.41	12; 126.45
2016–2017 season
Date	Event	SP	FS	Total
Feb. 28 – Mar. 5, 2017	2017 Cup of Tyrol	6; 43.42	2; 90.62	2; 134.04
December 14–17, 2016	2017 Italian Junior Championships	4; 48.17	5; 85.27	5; 133.44
