= Giada Russo =

Italian figure skater

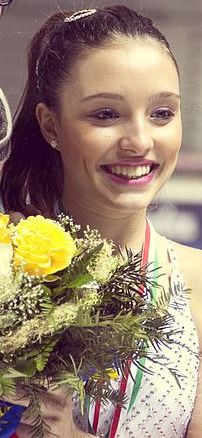
- Russo in 2014

Personal information
- Born: 25 May 1997 (age 29) Turin, Italy
- Height: 1.60 m (5 ft 3 in)

Figure skating career
- Country: Italy
- Coach: Claudia Masoero, Edoardo De Bernardis
- Skating club: Ice Club Torino ASD
- Began skating: 2001

Medal record
Italian Championships
Gold medal – first place	2015 Turin	Singles
Gold medal – first place	2016 Turin	Singles
Silver medal – second place	2018 Milan	Singles
Bronze medal – third place	2013 Milan	Singles
Bronze medal – third place	2017 Egna	Singles

Giada Russo (born 25 May 1997) is an Italian figure skater. A two-time Italian national champion, she has won nine senior international medals and qualified for the free skate at two ISU Championships.

== Personal life ==
Giada Russo was born on 25 May 1997 in Turin, Italy. In her teens, she was enrolled in the liceo psichopedagogico.

== Career ==
Russo's parents, having met while skating, introduced her to the activity when she was three and a half years old. She is coached by Edoardo De Bernardis and Claudia Masoero in Turin.

In the 2011–12 season, she won the Italian national junior title and a pair of junior international medals – bronze at the 2012 International Challenge Cup and gold at the Coupe du Printemps.

=== 2012–13 season ===
In 2012–13, Russo received her first ISU Junior Grand Prix (JGP) assignment and placed 13th at the event in Chemnitz, Germany, before taking the senior bronze medal at the Italian Championships in December 2012. Making her senior international debut, Russo placed fourth at the Dragon Trophy in February 2013 and won a bronze medal in April at the Gardena Spring Trophy.

=== 2013–14 season ===
Ahead of the 2013–14 season, Russo trained in Cerreto Laghi and in Los Angeles, where she received guidance from Christa Fassi. She placed tenth at her sole JGP assignment, in Mexico, and fifth at the 2014 Italian Championships. She was awarded two senior international medals, bronze at the 2014 Helmut Seibt Memorial and Gardena Spring Trophy.

=== 2014–15 season ===
Russo started the 2014–15 season at a JGP event, placing 13th in Dresden, but then competed exclusively on the senior level. After earning silver medals at the Merano Cup and Santa Claus Cup, she competed at the Italian Championships, held in Turin in December 2014. Ranked first in both programs, she won the national title by nearly 20.87 points over silver medalist Roberta Rodeghiero. She was assigned to her first ISU Championship, the European Championships, held in January 2015 in Stockholm, Sweden. Russo placed 28th in the short program, resulting in her elimination. In March 2015, she ranked 24th in the short program at the World Championships in Shanghai, allowing her to advance to the free skate. She finished 24th overall.

=== 2015–16 season ===
In December 2015, Russo won her second national title by placing first in both segments and outscoring Rodeghiero by 6.26 points. At the 2016 European Championships, she qualified for the final segment by placing 12th in the short program.

== Programs ==
Season	Short program	Free skating
2017-18	Eyes Wide Shut by Jocelyn Pook	Talk to Her by Alberto Iglesias
2016-17	Memorial by Michael Nyman	Adagietto (from Symphony No. 5) by Gustav Mahler
2015–16	Big Spender performed by Shirley Bassey	The Red Violin by John Corigliano
2014–15	Carmen by Georges Bizet	At Last; I Just Want to Make Love to You by Etta James
2013–14	The Phantom of the Opera by Andrew Lloyd Webber	W.E. by Abel Korzeniowski
2012–13	Boléro by Maurice Ravel	Adagio of Spartacus and Phrygia (from Spartacus) by Aram Khachaturian
2011–2012	East of Eden by Lee Holdridge	Memoirs of a Geisha by John Williams

== Competitive highlights ==
CS: Challenger Series; JGP: Junior Grand Prix

International
Event	11–12	12–13	13–14	14–15	15–16	16–17	17–18
Olympics							27th
Worlds				24th			
Europeans				28th	14th		19th
Challenge Cup				6th			
Cup of Nice					6th	7th	11th
Cup of Tyrol							1st
Finlandia Trophy			10th				
Gardena		3rd	3rd		1st		
Golden Bear						2nd	4th
Ice Challenge							2nd
Merano Cup				2nd	2nd	1st	1st
NRW Trophy						4th	
Printemps					3rd		
Santa Claus Cup				2nd			
Seibt Memorial			3rd				
Volvo Open Cup			4th				
Dragon Trophy		4th					
Universiade						12th	
International: Junior
JGP Germany		13th		13th			
JGP Mexico			10th				
EYOF		9th					
Challenge Cup	3rd J						
Cup of Nice		14th J					
Merano Cup			3rd J				
Printemps	1st J						
Santa Claus Cup		3rd J					
National
Italian Champ.	1st J	3rd	5th	1st	1st	3rd	2nd
J = Junior level, WD = Withdrew
