= Matilda Algotsson =

Swedish figure skater

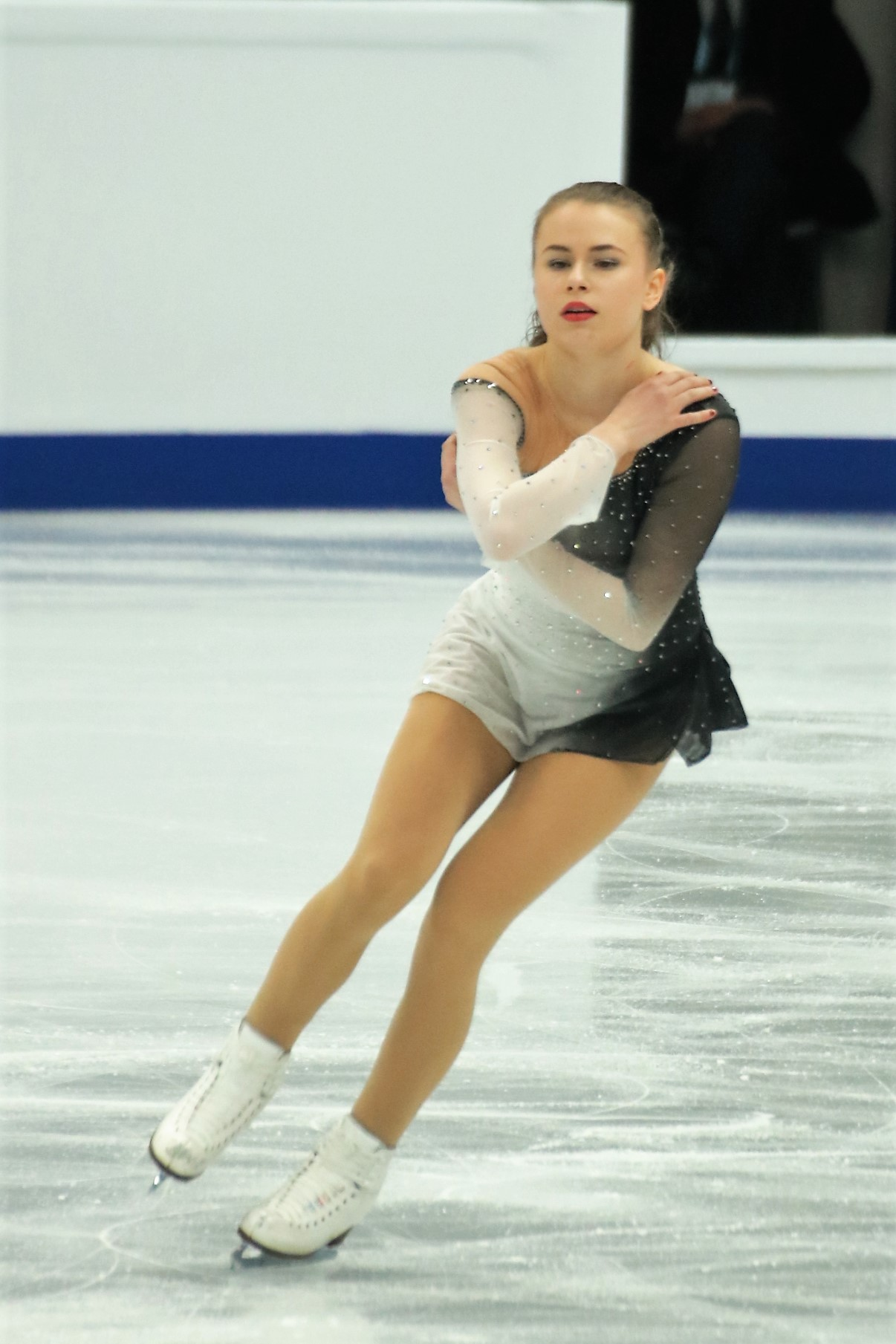
- Matilda Algotsson at the 2018 European Championships

Personal information
- Born: 29 May 1998 (age 28) Stockholm, Sweden
- Home town: Enebyberg, Sweden
- Height: 1.61 m (5 ft 3 in)

Figure skating career
- Country: Sweden
- Discipline: Women's singles
- Coach: Alexei Fedoseev; Anna Rechnio
- Skating club: Stockholms Allmänna Skridskoklubb
- Began skating: 2003

Medal record
Swedish Championships
Gold medal – first place	2019 Karlskrona	Singles
Silver medal – second place	2017 Malmö	Singles
Silver medal – second place	2018 Skellefteå	Singles
Bronze medal – third place	2016 Helsingborg	Singles

Matilda Algotsson (born 29 May 1998) is a Swedish figure skater. She is the 2017 CS Nebelhorn Trophy silver medalist, the 2015 Volvo Open Cup champion, and the 2019 Swedish national champion. She placed 13th at the 2016 and 2017 European Championships.

== Personal life ==
Matilda Algotsson was born on 29 May 1998 in Stockholm, Sweden. The middle child of Johanna and Anders Algotsson, she has an older sister, Emma, and younger brother, Rickard.

== Career ==
Algotsson started skating in 2003.

=== 2013–2014 season ===
In the 2013–2014 season, Algotsson won the Swedish national junior title and three international medals on the junior level – bronze at the Toruń Cup, silver at the Sarajevo Open, and bronze at the Nordics. She was assigned to represent Sweden at the 2014 World Junior Championships in Sofia, Bulgaria, but was eliminated after placing 28th in the short program.

=== 2014–2015 season ===
In 2014–2015, Algotsson debuted on the ISU Junior Grand Prix series, placing 20th in Japan. She repeated as the Swedish national junior champion and won junior gold at the Nordics.

=== 2015–2016 season ===
Algotsson placed 7th at her 2015 JGP assignment in Zagreb, Croatia. Making her senior international debut, she won gold at the Volvo Open Cup in November 2015. After winning the senior bronze medal at the Swedish Championships, she was named in Sweden's team to the 2016 European Championships in Bratislava, Slovakia. Ranked 18th in the short program, she qualified for the free skate where she placed 10th, lifting her to 13th overall. At the 2016 World Junior Championships, she placed 30th in the short program and did not advance further.

=== 2016–2017 season ===
Algotsson was awarded the silver medal at the Swedish Championships, having placed second to Joshi Helgesson. She reached the free skate at the 2017 European Championships in Ostrava, Czech Republic.

=== 2017–2018 season ===
A week before the competition, Sweden decided that Algotsson would replace Joshi Helgesson at the 2017 CS Nebelhorn Trophy. It was the final qualifying opportunity for the 2018 Winter Olympics. Algotsson won the silver medal and earned a spot for Sweden in the ladies' event at the Olympics. Algotsson obtained the silver medal in the Swedish national championships and did not reach the final in the European Championships.

=== 2018–2019 season ===
Algotsson participated in her first senior Grand Prix event, 2018 Internationaux de France, finishing 12th. She won the gold medal at the 2018 Swedish Figure Skating Championships.

=== 2019–2020 season ===
For the first time, she finished off the podium at the 2019 Swedish Figure Skating Championships. Despite this, she was assigned to compete at the World Championships in Montreal, but these were cancelled as a result of the coronavirus pandemic.

== Programs ==
Season	Short program	Free skating
2020–2021	Special Death by Mirah; The Carnival by Amanda Jenssen	Clouds, The Mind on the (Re)Wind by Ezio Bosso; Arcade by Duncan Laurence
2019–2020	La Vie en rose performed by Patricia Kaas	Salem's Secret by Peter Gundry; A Beautiful Mine (from Mad Men) Stephen Horelick
2018–2019	Fireflies by Craigie Dodds performed by Leona Lewis	Chalkboard by Jóhann Jóhannsson; Celesta Taboo Lament; Taboo Lament by Max Richter
2017–2018	Turn To Stone by Ingrid Michaelson	Minnie the Moocher performed by Big Bad Voodoo Daddy; At Last performed by Mack Gordon, Harry Warren; Jumpin' Jack performed by Big Bad Voodoo Daddy
2015–2017	The Hanging Tree - Rebel remix by James Newton Howard	You Have To Be There by Björn Ulvaeus, Benny Andersson
2014–2015	Archangel by Two Steps from Hell	Perfection by Clint Mansell

== Competitive highlights ==
- GP – Event of the ISU Grand Prix Series
- JGP – Event of the ISU Junior Grand Prix Series
- CS – Event of the ISU Challenger Series

Competition placements at senior level
Season	2015–16	2016–17	2017–18	2018–19	2019–20	2020–21
European Championships	13th	13th	31st			
Swedish Championships	3rd	2nd	2nd	1st	4th	
GP Internationaux de France				12th		
CS Golden Spin of Zagreb		12th				
CS Ice Star				7th	8th	
CS Lombardia Trophy			9th			
CS Nebelhorn Trophy			2nd	12th	13th	
CS Tallinn Trophy			18th			
CS Warsaw Cup					14th	
Bavarian Open					6th	
Cup of Tyrol				15th		
Golden Bear of Zagreb		4th	3rd			
Mentor Cup	6th	7th				
Nordic Championships	5th	8th		5th		
NRW Trophy						5th
Tallink Hotels Cup						14th
Volvo Open Cup	1st	4th		13th		

Competition placements at junior level
Season	2013–14	2014–15	2015–16	2016–17
World Junior Championships	28th		30th	
Swedish Championships	1st	1st		
JGP Croatia			7th	
JGP Japan		20th		
JGP Slovenia				10th
Coupe du Printemps		4th		
Gardena Spring Trophy		3rd		
Hellmut Seibt Memorial		7th		
Ice Challenge	8th			
Lombardia Trophy			5th	
Mentor Toruń Cup	3rd	2nd		
Nordic Championships	3rd	1st		
NRW Trophy		5th	4th	
Sarajevo Open	2nd			
