= Egna Spring Trophy =

International figure skating competition

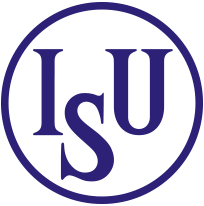
- Location: Italy

The Egna Spring Trophy (formerly the Gardena Spring Trophy) is an annual international figure skating competition which is generally held every spring in Val Gardena in Italy. Medals may be awarded in men's singles, women's singles, and pair skating. Since its inception in 1990, the event has included a junior-level competition. Novice categories were added in 2006 and senior categories in 2011. An ice dance competition, the Egna Dance Trophy, debuted in February 2018.

== Senior results ==
=== Men's singles ===
Year	Location	Gold	Silver	Bronze	Ref.
2011	Sëlva	(Russia) Vladislav Sesganov	(Italy) Paolo Bacchini	(Japan) Takahito Mura	
2012	Sëlva	(Russia) Konstantin Menshov	(Russia) Vladislav Sesganov	(Japan) Yoji Tsuboi	
2013	Sëlva	(Japan) Takahiko Kozuka	(United States) Adam Rippon	(Switzerland) Stéphane Walker	
2014	Sëlva	(Japan) Shoma Uno	(United States) Ross Miner	(Russia) Mikhail Kolyada	
2015	Sëlva	(Russia) Mikhail Kolyada	(Japan) Keiji Tanaka	(Japan) Hiroaki Sato	
2016	Egna	(Australia) Brendan Kerry	(Canada) Kevin Reynolds	(Switzerland) Stéphane Walker	
2017	Egna	(Italy) Marco Zandron	(Italy) Alessandro Fadini	(Estonia) Aleksandr Selevko	
2018	Egna	(Italy) Daniel Grassl	(Italy) Mattia Dalla Torre	(Italy) Jari Kessler	
2019	Egna	(United States) Alexei Krasnozhon	(United States) Andrew Torgashev	(Switzerland) Nicola Todeschini	
2020	Cancelled due to the COVID-19 pandemic				
2021	Egna	(Italy) Gabriele Frangipani	(Italy) Alessandro Fadini	(Spain) Tomás Llorenç Guarino Sabaté	
2022	Egna	(Italy) Gabriele Frangipani	(Japan) Sena Miyake	(United States) Liam Kapeikis	

=== Women's singles ===
Year	Location	Gold	Silver	Bronze	Ref.
2011	Sëlva	(Italy) Carolina Kostner	(Japan) Ayumi Goto	(Japan) Haruka Imai	
2012	Sëlva	(Italy) Roberta Rodeghiero	(Japan) Yuki Nishino	(Italy) Francesca Rio	
2013	Sëlva	(Italy) Valentina Marchei	(Japan) Haruka Imai	(Italy) Giada Russo	
2014	Sëlva	(Japan) Satoko Miyahara	(Japan) Miyabi Oba	(Italy) Giada Russo	
2015	Sëlva	(Japan) Rin Nitaya	(Italy) Guia Maria Tagliapietra	(Italy) Ilaria Nogaro	
2016	Egna	(Italy) Giada Russo	(Italy) Micol Cristini	(Austria) Kerstin Frank	
2017	Egna	(Philippines) Alisson Krystle Perticheto	(Russia) Mariia Bessonova	(Estonia) Kristina Škuleta-Gromova	
2018	Egna	(Germany) Nathalie Weinzierl	(Italy) Elettra Maria Olivotto	(Romania) Julia Sauter	
2019	Egna	(United States) Gabriella Izzo	(United States) Starr Andrews	(Italy) Marina Piredda	
2020	Cancelled due to the COVID-19 pandemic				
2021	Egna	(Italy) Lucrezia Beccari	(Italy) Roberta Rodeghiero	(Slovenia) Daša Grm	
2022	Egna	(Japan) Hana Yoshida	(South Korea) Hae-in Lee	(Japan) Mone Chiba	

=== Pairs ===
Year	Location	Gold	Silver	Bronze	Ref.
2018	Egna	(Netherlands); Anastasiia Smirnova; Dimitry Epstein	No other competitors		
2019	Egna	(Italy); Irma Caldara; Marco Santucci	No other competitors		
2020	Cancelled due to the COVID-19 pandemic				

=== Ice dance ===
Year	Location	Gold	Silver	Bronze	Ref.
2018	Egna	(Finland); Cecilia Törn; Jussiville Partanen	(Italy); Jasmine Tessari; Francesco Fioretti	(Russia); Sofia Evdokimova; Egor Bazin	
2019	Egna	(Italy); Jasmine Tessari; Francesco Fioretti	(Italy); Chiara Calderone; Pietro Papetti	(Russia); Alla Loboda; Anton Shibnev	
2020	Egna	(Finland); Juulia Turkkila; Matthias Versluis	(Russia); Anastasia Skoptsova; Kirill Aleshin	(France); Adelina Galyavieva; Louis Thauron	
2021	Egna	(Czech Republic); Natálie Taschlerová; Filip Taschler	(Germany); Jennifer Janse van Rensburg; Benjamin Steffan	(Italy); Carolina Moscheni; Francesco Fioretti	
2022	Egna	(Germany); Jennifer Janse van Rensburg; Benjamin Steffan	(Italy); Carolina Moscheni; Francesco Fioretti	(Israel); Mariia Nosovitskaya; Mikhail Nosovitskiy	
2023	Egna	(Italy); Victoria Manni; Carlo Röthlisberger	(Italy); Leia Dozzi; Pietro Papetti	(Germany); Charise Matthaei; Max Liebers	
2024	Egna	(France); Marie Dupayage; Thomas Nabais	(United States); Isabella Flores; Ivan Desyatov	(Republic of Ireland); Carolane Soucisse; Shane Firus	
2025	Egna	(Lithuania); Allison Reed; Saulius Ambrulevicius	(France); Marie Dupayage; Thomas Nabais	(Italy); Victoria Manni; Carlo Röthlisberger	

== Junior results ==
=== Men's singles ===
Year	Location	Gold	Silver	Bronze	Ref.
1996		(Japan) Taijin Hiraike	(United States) Timothy Goebel	(Canada) Doug Bourque	
1997	Urtijëi	(United States) Matthew Savoie	(Germany) Stefan Lindemann	(Japan) Soshi Tanaka	
1998	Urtijëi	(Canada) Blair Smith	(France) Fabien Millasseau	(United States) Braden Overett	
1999	Urtijëi	(United States) Ryan Bradley	(Slovenia) Gregor Urbas	(France) Johan Sandhomme	
2000	Urtijëi	(Slovenia) Gregor Urbas	(United States) Evan Lysacek	(France) Mathieu Delchambre	
2001	Urtijëi	(France) Brian Joubert	(United States) Michael Villareal	(Italy) Daniel D'Inca	
2002	Urtijëi	(United States) Parker Pennington	(Canada) Keegan Murphy	(France) Samuel Contesti	
2003	Urtijëi	(United States) Dennis Phan	(Italy) Paolo Bacchini	(France) Gregory Reverdiau	
2004	Sëlva	(United States) Traighe Rouse	(United States) Princeton Kwong	(Czech Republic) Tomáš Janečko	
2005	Sëlva	(United States) Craig Ratterree	(United States) Austin Kanallakan	(Italy) Paolo Bacchini	
2006	Sëlva	(United States) Curran Oi	(Japan) Takemochi Ogami	(Czech Republic) Michal Březina	
2007	Sëlva	(United States) Richard Dornbush	(Czech Republic) Michal Březina	(United States) Alexander Johnson	
2008	Sëlva	(United States) Grant Hochstein	(United States) Ross Miner	(Russia) Aleksandr Stepanov	
2009	Sëlva	(Japan) Tatsuki Machida	(Belgium) Jorik Hendrickx	(Germany) Alexander Schöpke	
2010	Sëlva	(United States) Jason Brown	(United States) Max Aaron	(United States) TJ Young	
2011	Sëlva	(United States) Harrison Choate	(United States) Philip Warren	(United States) Shotaro Omori	
2012	Sëlva	(United States) Lukas Kaugars	(Germany) Anton Kempf	(Italy) Alessandro Pezzoli	
2013	Sëlva	(United States) Jordan Moeller	(Japan) Shu Nakamura	(United States) Jimmy Ma	
2014	Sëlva	(United States) Tony Lu	(United States) Paolo Borromeo	(France) Kévin Aymoz	
2015	Sëlva	(United States) Oleksiy Melnyk	(Russia) Igor Murashov	(Germany) Dave Kötting	
2016	Egna	(Italy) Daniel Grassl	(Russia) Gleb Ivanov	(United States) Eric Sjoberg	
2017	Egna	(Italy) Daniel Grassl	(Italy) Paolo Balestri	(Estonia) Mihhail Selevko	
2018	Egna	(Italy) Gabriele Frangipani	(Canada) Beresford Clements	(Italy) Nikolaj Memola	
2019	Egna	(Italy) Nikolaj Memola	(Sweden) Oliver Praetorius	(Spain) Patrizio Romano Rossi	
2020	Cancelled due to the COVID-19 pandemic				
2021	Egna	(Italy) Nikolaj Memola	(Switzerland) Naoki Rossi	(Italy) Raffaele Francesco Zich	
2022	Egna	(Japan) Takeru Amine Kataise	(Switzerland) Naoki Rossi	(Japan) Nozomu Yoshioka	

=== Women's singles ===
Year	Location	Gold	Silver	Bronze	Ref.
1990		(West Germany) Claudia Unger	(United States) Charlene Von Saher	(Japan) Rena Inoue	
1991					
1992		(Japan) Hanae Yokoya	(Russia) Irina Slutskaya	(United States) Lefki Terzakis	
1993		(United States) Michelle Kwan	(United States) Jenna Pittman		
1994					
1995		(United States) Brittney McConn	(Finland) Alisa Drei	(Hungary) Júlia Sebestyén	
1996		(Russia) Elena Sokolova	(United States) Diana Miro	(Germany) Eva-Maria Fitze	
1997	Urtijëi	(Finland) Elina Kettunen	(United States) Andrea Gardiner	(Japan) Yuka Kanazawa	
1998	Urtijëi	(Poland) Anna Jurkiewicz	(Germany) Zana Cvjetkovic	(United States) Andrea Aggeler	
1999	Urtijëi	(United States) Sasha Cohen	(Switzerland) Berrak Destanli	(United States) Sara Wheat	
2000	Urtijëi	(United States) Ann Patrice McDonough	(Finland) Susanna Pöykiö	(United States) Lisa Nesuda	
2001	Urtijëi	(Italy) Claudia DiCostanzo	(Czech Republic) Lucie Krausová	(United States) Joan Cristobal	
2002	Urtijëi	(United States) Alissa Czisny	(United States) Felicia Beck	(Canada) Krysta Pouliot	
2003	Urtijëi	(Belgium) Natalie Hoste	(Finland) Laura Lepistö	(Italy) Martina Sasanelli	
2004	Sëlva	(United States) Christine Zukowski	(United States) Erin Reed	(Italy) Federica Constantini	
2005	Sëlva	(United States) Jean Sandra Rucker	(United States) Tenile Victorsen	(Switzerland) Kimena Brog-Meier	
2006	Sëlva	(United States) Melissa Bulanhagui	(Japan) Rumi Suizu	(Japan) Miri Yoshida	
2007	Sëlva	(Italy) Francesca Rio	(Slovakia) Ivana Reitmayerová	(Italy) Federica Constantini	
2008	Sëlva	(United States) Karen Zhou	(United States) Victoria Rackohn	(Japan) Satsuki Muramoto	
2009	Sëlva	(Slovakia) Karolína Sýkorová	(Switzerland) Romy Bühler	(Italy) Roberta Rodeghiero	
2010	Sëlva	(United States) Samantha Cesario	(United States) Lindsay Davis	(Italy) Caterina Andermarcher	
2011	Sëlva	(United States) Lauren Dinh	(United States) Katarina Kulgeyko	(Italy) Giada Russo	
2012	Sëlva	(United States) Barbie Long	(United States) Mariah Bell	(Germany) Luisa Weber	
2013	Sëlva	(United States) Polina Edmunds	(Japan) Rin Nitaya	(Italy) Briley Pizzelanti	
2014	Sëlva	(Kazakhstan) Elizabet Tursynbayeva	(United States) Ashley Shin	(United States) Bradie Tennell	
2015	Sëlva	(Japan) Mai Mihara	(United States) Emily Chan	(Sweden) Matilda Algotsson	
2016	Egna	(United States) Alexia Paganini	(United States) Haley Beavers	(Italy) Elisabetta Leccardi	
2017	Egna	(Russia) Anastasiia Gubanova	(Italy) Sara Conti	(Hong Kong) Hiu Ching Kwong	
2018	Egna	(Italy) Marina Piredda	(United States) Hanna Harrell	(Italy) Alessia Tornaghi	
2019	Egna	(United States) Calista Choi	(Italy) Alessia Tornaghi	(Austria) Olga Mikutina	
2020	Cancelled due to the COVID-19 pandemic				
2021	Egna	(Belgium) Nina Pinzarrone	(Italy) Anna Pezzetta	(Lithuania) Jogaile Aglinskyte	
2022	Egna	(Italy) Anna Pezzetta	(United States) Hannah Herrera	(Canada) Fiona Bombardier	

=== Pairs ===
Year	Location	Gold	Silver	Bronze	Ref.
2019	Egna	(Italy); Alyssa Chiara Montan; Manuel Piazza	(Italy); Federica Zamponi; Marco Zandron	(Italy); Giulia Papa; Riccardo Maglio	

=== Ice dance ===
Year	Location	Gold	Silver	Bronze	Ref.
2018	Egna	(Russia); Anastassia Shakun; Daniil Ragimov	(Italy); Francesca Righi; Aleksei Dubrovin	(Italy); Chiara Calderone; Pietro Papetti	
2019	Egna	(France); Loïcia Demougeot; Théo le Mercier	(France); Evgenia Lopareva; Geoffrey Brissaud	(United Kingdom); Sasha Fear; George Waddell	
2020	Egna	(United States); Molly Cesanek; Yehor Yehorov	(United States); Katarina DelCamp; Ian Somerville	(Italy); Sara Campanini; Francesco Riva	
2021	Egna	(France); Loïcia Demougeot; Théo le Mercier	(France); Marie Dupayage; Thomas Nabais	(Czech Republic); Denisa Cimlová; Vilém Hlavsa	
2022	Egna	(Czech Republic); Kateřina Mrázková; Daniel Mrázek	(Canada); Natalie D'Alessandro; Bruce Waddell	(Israel); Elizabeth Tkachenko; Alexei Kiliakov	
2023	Egna	(Czech Republic); Kateřina Mrázková; Daniel Mrázek	(Italy); Noemi Tali; Stefano Frasca	(Slovakia); Anna Šimová; Kirill Aksenov	
2024	Egna	(Italy); Noemi Tali; Noah Lafornara	(France); Celina Fradji; Jean-Hans Fourneaux	(United States); Jenna Hauer; Benjamin Starr	
2025	Egna	(France); Celina Fradji; Jean-Hans Fourneaux	(France); Louise Bordet; Martin Chardain	(United States); Emily Renzi; William Lissauer	
