= Ayumi Goto =

Japanese figure skater

Personal information
- Born: February 4, 1993 (age 33) Ichinomiya, Aichi
- Height: 1.55 m (5 ft 1 in)

Figure skating career
- Country: Japan
- Coach: Hiroshi Nagakubo
- Skating club: Aichi Mizuho University
- Began skating: 1999

Ayumi Goto (後藤 亜由美, Gotō Ayumi; born February 4, 1993) is a Japanese former figure skater. She is the 2011 Gardena Spring Trophy silver medalist.

== Programs ==
Season	Short program	Free skating
2011–2012		Scheherazade by Nikolai Rimsky-Korsakov
2010–2011	Quixote by Magnus Fiennes performed by Bond	Pirates of the Caribbean by Klaus Badelt
2009–2010	Vamos a Bailar by Gipsy Kings	Alegría from Cirque du Soleil

== Competitive highlights ==
International
Event	02–03	03–04	04–05	05–06	06–07	07–08	08–09	09–10	10–11	11–12
Crystal Skate										17th
Gardena									2nd	
International: Junior
JGP Austria									11th	
JGP Germany									8th	
National
Japan Champ.							16th	8th	11th	
Japan Junior					24th					
Japan Novice	15th NB	19th NB	7th NA							
East Japan					11th J.		4th	2nd	2nd	17th
Chubu	4th NB	3rd NB	2nd NA	6th NA	8th J.	10th J.	1st	2nd		7th
Levels: NA = Novice-A; NB = Novice-B; N. = Novice; J. = Junior
