= Barcelona Gipsy balKan Orchestra =

Roma band

- Origin: Barcelona, Spain
- Genres: Balkan; Klezmer; Romani music; Jazz Manouche
- Years active: 2012-present
- Labels: Satélite K
- Members: Margherita Abita; Julien Chanal; Ivan Kovačević; Stelios Togias; Oleksandr Sora; Xavi Pendón; Fernando Salinas; Albert Enkaminanko
- Past members: Robindro Nikolić - co-founder, clarinetist: Sandra Sangiao; Mattia Schirosa
- Website: Official website

Barcelona Gipsy balKan Orchestra (BGKO) is a band created in 2012 in Barcelona, Spain. The band draws on many musical influences, including Klezmer music, Jazz Manouche, and Romani music. BGKO also explores the sounds of some Eastern European regions and draws inspiration from music in the regions of South America, Spain, and the Middle East.

In 2015 the band changed its name from Barcelona Gipsy Klezmer Orchestra to Barcelona Gipsy balKan Orchestra, keeping BGKO as its acronym.

== History ==
The permanent members of BGKO are vocalist Margherita Abita (Italy), clarinetist Xavi Pendón (Spain), accordionist Fernando Salinas (Spain), double bassist Ivan Kovačević (Serbia), guitarist Julien Chanal (France), violinist Oleksandr Sora (Ukraine), and percussionist Albert Enkaminanko (Spain). BGKO also includes rotating Roma musicians, and the performances of the band reflect the style of the various artists that perform with them.

The group originated in the spring of 2012, when eleven musicians gathered in Barcelona to celebrate International Romani Day. Some of them had already met at various jam sessions, including at El Arco de la Virgen, and at other musical venues in Barcelona.

In 2013, Barcelona Gipsy Klezmer Orchestra self-published its first album, Imbarca, which was re-released one year later with the vinyl EP Satélite K. The re-release included three new songs: "Hasta Siempre, Comandante", "Cigani Ljubiat Pesnji", and "La dama d'Aragó". After releasing Satélite K in 2014, BGKO played on tours around Italy, Greece, Malta, Serbia, Slovenia, Germany, and France, in concerts and festivals in Spain, and at the Auditorium of Barcelona.

BGKO hosted the Balkan Reunion in March 2015, which brought together numerous notable Balkan musicians from around Europe, including the Macedonian saxophonist King Ferus Mustafov (referent from the East Gipsy music), Vlado Kreslin (known for his collaborations with R.E.M.), and the Turkish singer Nihan Devecioglu. Around 1,300 people attended the concert, which took place at Sala Apolo. BGKO's second disc, which germinated from this Balkan encounter, was released in September 2015. Throughout 2015, the band played in Granada, Málaga, Palau de la Música Catalana, Ireland, the Netherlands, France, Austria, Switzerland, Serbia, Germany, and Istanbul.

During spring 2015, BGKO began a management and booking collaboration with Diggers Music.

In late 2019, lead vocalist Sandra Sangiao left the group and was replaced by Margherita Abita as lead singer. In March 2021, accordionist Mattia Schirosa left the group, to be succeeded by Fernando Salinas.

== Discography ==
- Imbarca (2012)
- Balkan Reunion (2015)
- Europa cierra la frontera – Soundtrack (2016)
- Del Ebro al Danubio (2016)
- Avo Kanto (2018)
- Nova Era (2020)
- 7 (2024)

== Sources ==
- "BARCELONA GIPSY BALKAN ORCHESTRA". MEDITERRANIA MUSIC @GENTUR. Archived from the original on August 16, 2016.
