= Lucrezia Beccari =

Italian figure skater (born 2003)

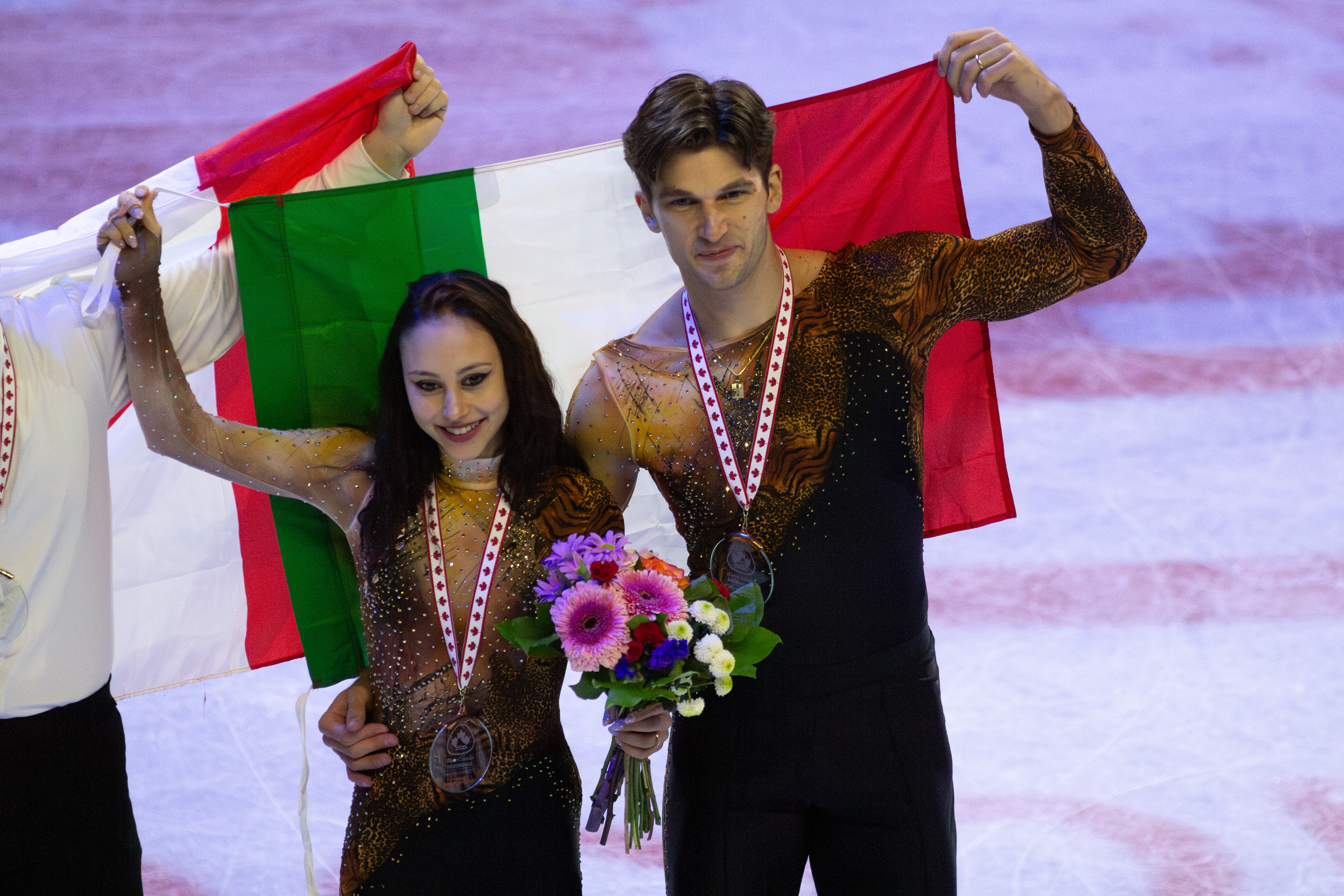
- Lucrezia Beccari and Matteo Guarise at the 2023 Skate Canada International

Personal information
- Born: 18 December 2003 (age 22) Turin, Italy
- Home town: Rivoli, Italy
- Height: 1.58 m (5 ft 2 in)

Figure skating career
- Country: Italy
- Discipline: Pair skating (since 2022); Women's singles (2017–22)
- Partner: Matteo Guarise (since 2022)
- Coach: Luca Demattè; Rosanna Murante
- Skating club: Gruppo Sportivo Fiamme Azzurre
- Began skating: 2009

Medal record
European Championships
Gold medal – first place	2024 Kaunas	Pairs
Italian Championships
Silver medal – second place	2019 Trento	Singles
Silver medal – second place	2024 Pinerolo	Pairs
Bronze medal – third place	2021 Egna	Singles
Bronze medal – third place	2023 Brunico	Pairs

Lucrezia Beccari (born 18 December 2003) is an Italian figure skater, who currently competes in pair skating with partner Matteo Guarise. With Guarise, she is the 2024 European champion, two-time ISU Grand Prix medalists, 2023 CS Nebelhorn Trophy silver medalists and 2024 Italian national silver medalists.

As a single skater, she is the 2019 Italian national silver medalist on the senior level and 2018 junior champion. She has competed in the final segment at two ISU Championships – the 2018 and 2019 World Junior Championships.

== Career ==
=== Early years ===
Beccari began learning to skate in 2009. In 2014 and 2015, she competed in novice ice dancing with Pietro Turbiglio. In 2016, she was off the ice for several months due to an injury.

Competing in the advanced novice ladies' category, Beccari became the Italian national champion in March 2017 and took silver at the Rooster Cup in April, coached by Edoardo De Bernardis.

=== 2017–18 season ===
Beccari became age-eligible for junior international events and made her ISU Junior Grand Prix (JGP) debut in September, placing seventh in Minsk, Belarus. After winning the national junior title, she was selected to represent Italy at the 2018 World Junior Championships in Sofia, Bulgaria; she finished sixteenth overall after placing twenty-third in the short program and eleventh in the free skate. During the season, she was coached by Edoardo De Bernardis and Claudia Masoero in Turin.

=== 2018–19 season ===
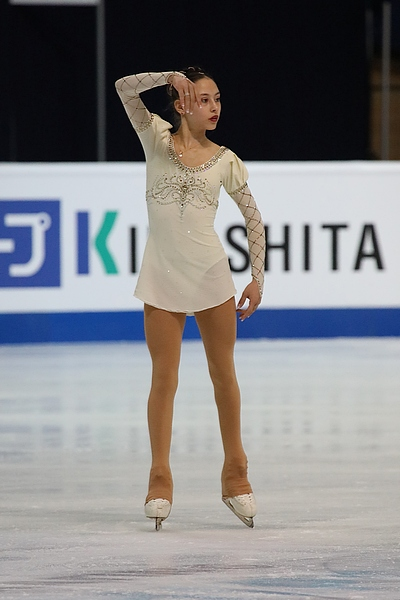
Beccari at the 2019 World Junior Championships

Beccari decided to train under Franca Bianconi in Bergamo. Starting her season on the JGP series, she placed seventh in Kaunas, Lithuania, and fifteenth in Ljubljana, Slovenia. She then won three junior international medals – bronze at the Golden Bear of Zagreb, gold at the Warsaw Cup, and gold at the Denkova-Staviski Cup. Although too young for international senior-level events, she competed in the senior category at the Italian Championships in December. Ranked first in the short program and fourth in the free skate, she was awarded the silver medal.

=== 2019–20 season ===
In her final appearance on the Junior Grand Prix, Beccari placed sixteenth at the 2021 JGP Poland. Making her senior debut on the Challenger series, she competed three times at 2019 CS Lombardia Trophy, 2019 CS Warsaw Cup, and 2019 CS Golden Spin of Zagreb. Beccari was fourth at the Italian championships and competed at several other minor internationals.

=== 2020–21 season ===
In an international season greatly limited by the onset of the COVID-19 pandemic, Beccari was the Italian national bronze medalist and won the Egna Trophy.

=== 2021–22 season ===
Beccari withdrew from the 2021 CS Lombardia Trophy. Following the cancellation of the 2021 Cup of China, Italy unexpectedly became the host of the third event in the Grand Prix, the 2021 Gran Premio d'Italia. Beccari was one of two Italian women assigned to compete at the home Grand Prix (along with Lara Naki Gutmann), making her Grand Prix debut with a twelfth-place finish. She was sixth at the Italian championships.

=== 2022–23 season ===
In the summer of 2022, Beccari had the opportunity to switch to pair skating after reigning Italian national champion Nicole Della Monica decided to retire following the Beijing Olympics, leaving her partner Matteo Guarise looking for a new partner to continue onward to the 2026 Winter Olympics in Milan and Cortina d'Ampezzo. Beccari would later say that she had previously tried out in pairs, but due to an injury had focused on singles skating. However, she had reconsidered after the prior season, citing that "I had a lot of physical issues that affected me on the ice and in all my competitions. I was feeling low, both physically and mentally. I instantly decided that I needed a drastic change"

Beccari/Guarise made their international debut at the 2022 CS Warsaw Cup, finishing in fourth place. They won the bronze medal at their first Italian championships, and were seventh at the 2023 European Championships.

=== 2023–24 season ===
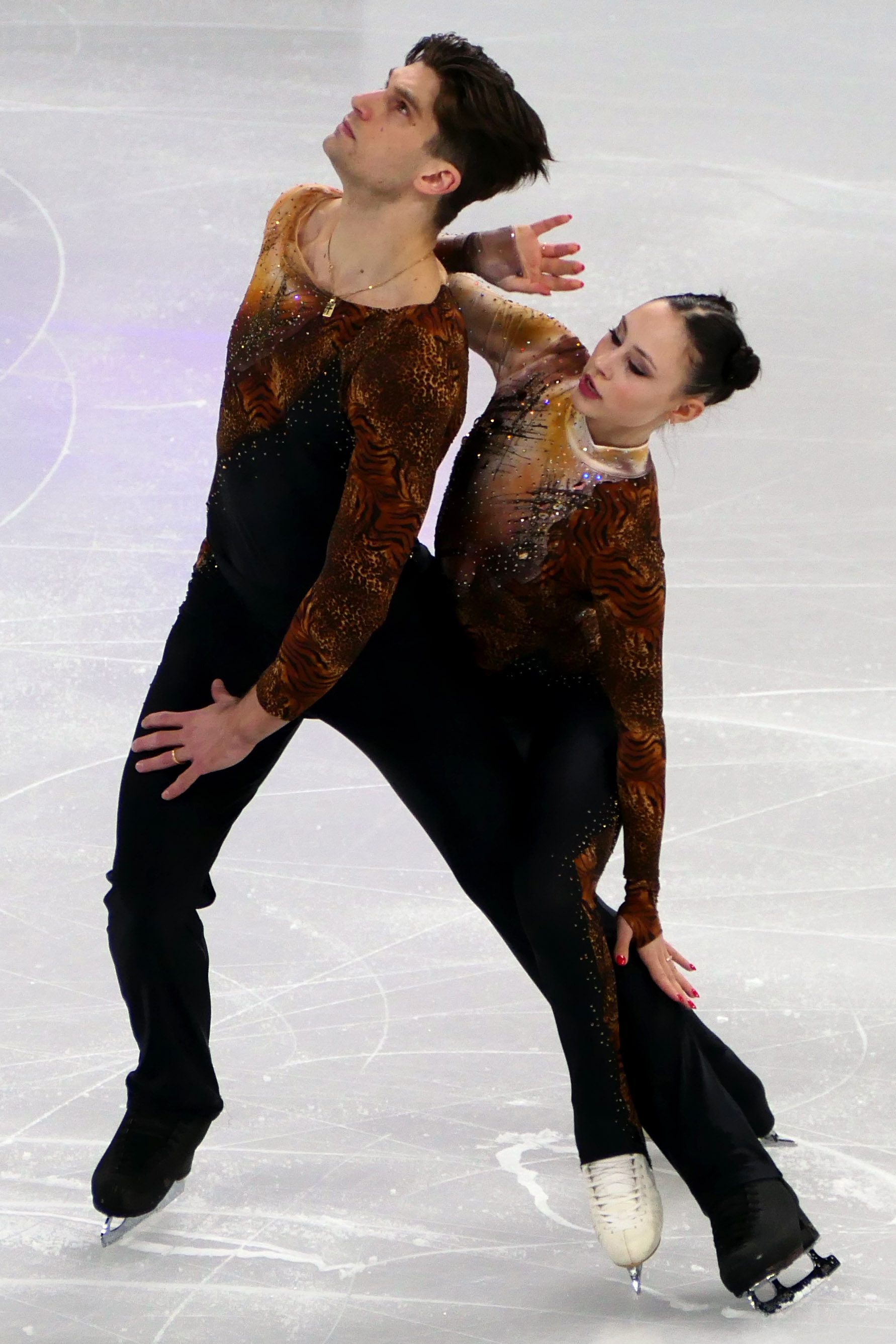
Beccari and Guarise during their free skate at the 2024 World Championships

Beccari/Guarise began the season with a fourth-place finish at the 2023 CS Lombardia Trophy. At their second Challenger event, the 2023 CS Nebelhorn Trophy, they won the silver medal, their first international podium together. They set new personal bests in both the free skate and total score. They were invited to make their Grand Prix debut at the 2023 Skate Canada International, where they won the bronze medal, despite each making a jump error in the free skate. Beccari remarked that she was "really happy" about her "first important medal," though "about the skate, we are not that happy." Guarise deemed it a "learning experience." They went on to win the silver medal at the 2023 NHK Trophy. Beccari/Guarise finished the Grand Prix with the same placements as fellow Italian team Ghilardi/Ambrosini and Hungarians Pavlova/Sviatchenko, but lost the tiebreaker of cumulative scores, and thus finished as second alternates to the Grand Prix Final. Guarise acknowledged this as disappointing, but said "for our first Grand Prix season we can be pleased."

After winning the silver medal at the Italian championships, Beccari/Guarise competed at the 2024 European Championships in Kaunas, generally noted rated among the title favourites in pre-event assessments. They finished third in the short program with a new personal best score, but then unexpectedly won the free skate and took the gold medal, 3.05 points ahead of Georgian silver medalists Metelkina/Berulava.

Beccari/Guarise were given one of the two Italian berths at the 2024 World Championships in Montreal. The finished eighth in the short program, ninth in the free skate, and ninth overall.

=== 2024–25 season ===
Beccari/Guarise began the season by winning silver at the 2024 Shanghai Trophy. Although the pair were scheduled to compete on the 2024–25 Grand Prix circuit at 2024 Skate Canada International and 2024 NHK Trophy, they would withdraw from both events due to Beccari sustaining a foot injury.

In December, Beccari announced that she and Guarise would miss the remainder of the season due to her needing to undergo surgery for her injury.

=== 2025–26 season ===
Returning to competition, Beccari/Guarise opened the season by competing on the 2025–26 ISU Challenger Series, finishing seventh at the 2025 CS Nebelhorn Trophy and at the 2025 CS Trialeti Trophy.

They subsequently competed at the 2025 Cup of China but were forced to withdraw before the free skate due to Beccari sustaining an injury. They went on to withdraw from their second Grand Prix assignment, 2025 Skate America, as well. The pair did not compete at the 2026 Italian Championships. Although assigned, they elected to withdraw from the 2026 European Championships.

== Programs ==
=== With Guarise ===
Season	Short program	Free skating	Exhibition
2025–26	Run by Ludovico Einaudi choreo. by Luca Demattè, Barbara Fusar-Poli; Reel Around The Sun by Bill Whelan choreo. by Lukáš Csölley, Barbara Fusar-Poli	Romeo and Juliet; Kissing You (from Romeo + Juliet) by Des'ree; First Kiss; Forbidden Love from (Romeo & Juliet) by Abel Korzeniowski; O Verona (from Romeo + Juliet) by Craig Armstrong choreo. by Lukáš Csölley, Barbara Fusar-Poli	
2024–25	Reel Around The Sun by Bill Whelan choreo. by Lukáš Csölley, Barbara Fusar-Poli	Romeo and Juliet; Kissing You (from Romeo + Juliet) by Des'ree; First Kiss; Forbidden Love from (Romeo & Juliet) by Abel Korzeniowski; O Verona (from Romeo + Juliet) by Craig Armstrong choreo. by Lukáš Csölley, Barbara Fusar-Poli	Golden Hour by Jvke
2023–24	Run by Ludovico Einaudi choreo. by Luca Demattè, Barbara Fusar-Poli	Cats by Andrew Lloyd Webber & T. S. Eliot; Macavity: The Mystery Cat performed by Graham Hurman, John Ashton, Thomas Simon Lee, & Taylor Swift; Memory performed by Jennifer Hudson; Skimbleshanks: The Railway Cat performed by Steven McRae choreo. by Luca Demattè, Barbara Fusar-Poli	Golden Hour by Jvke
2022–23	The Joker and the Queen by Ed Sheeran; The Joker and the Queen performed by Louie Ashley choreo. by Valter Rizzo	Les Misérables by Claude-Michel Schönberg; I Dreamed a Dream performed by Susan Boyle; On My Own performed by Rosalind James choreo. by Valter Rizzo	

=== Single skating ===
Season	Short program	Free skating
2021–2022	Limelight by Charlie Chaplin choreo. by Corrado Giordani	Song for the Little Sparrow by Abel Korzeniowski performed by Patricia Kaas choreo. by Corrado Giordani
2019–2020	Moonlight Sonata by Ludwig van Beethoven; Morir d'amor by Marianna Cataldi choreo. by Misha Ge	A New Family (from Cinderella) by Patrick Doyle; Midnight (from Cinderella) by Sergei Prokofiev; A Dream Is a Wish Your Heart Makes (from Cinderella) by Mack David, Al Hoffman, Jerry Livingston performed by Lily James choreo. by Valter Rizzo, Corrado Giordani, Massimo Scali
2018–2019	Fire Dance by Manuel de Falla choreo. by Valter Rizzo, Corrado Giordani	Phantom Thread by Jonny Greenwood choreo. by Valter Rizzo, Corrado Giordani
2017–2018	Alien (soundtrack) by Jerry Goldsmith; Slow by Kylie Minogue; Visitors (soundtrack) choreo. by Edoardo De Bernardis	Schindler's List by John Williams choreo. by Edoardo De Bernardis

== Competitive highlights ==
- GP – Event of the ISU Grand Prix Series
- CS – Event of the ISU Challenger Series
- TBD – Assigned
- WD – Withdrew from competition

=== Pair skating with Matteo Guarise ===
Competition placements at senior level
Season	2022–23	2023–24	2024–25	2025–26
World Championships		9th		
European Championships	7th	1st		
Italian Championships	3rd	2nd		
GP Cup of China				WD
GP NHK Trophy		2nd		
GP Skate Canada		3rd		
CS Lombardia Trophy		4th		
CS Nebelhorn Trophy		2nd		7th
CS Trialeti Trophy				7th
CS Warsaw Cup	4th			
Challenge Cup		2nd		
Shanghai Trophy			2nd	

=== Single skating ===
International
Event	17–18	18–19	19–20	20–21	21–22
GP Italy					12th
CS Golden Spin			7th		
CS Lombardia			7th		WD
CS Warsaw Cup			11th		
EduSport Trophy			1st		
Egna Trophy				1st	
Halloween Cup			1st		
Icelab International					1st
Merano Cup					2nd
Sofia Trophy			2nd		
Tirnavia Ice Cup					WD
International: Junior
Junior Worlds	16th	16th			
JGP Belarus	7th				
JGP Lithuania		7th			
JGP Poland			16th		
JGP Slovenia		15th			
EYOF		2nd			
Bavarian Open		3rd			
Cup of Nice	7th				
Cup of Tyrol	2nd				
Denkova-Staviski		1st			
EduSport Trophy		1st			
Golden Bear	2nd	3rd			
IceLab Cup			4th		
Merano Cup	1st				
Skate Helena	1st				
Warsaw Cup		1st			
National
Italian Champ.	1st J	2nd	4th	3rd	6th

== Detailed results ==
ISU personal best scores in the +5/-5 GOE System
Segment	Type	Score	Event
Total	TSS	199.19	2024 European Championships
Short program	TSS	67.05	2024 European Championships
Short program	TES	37.35	2023 CS Lombardia Trophy
Short program	PCS	31.01	2024 World Championships
Free skating	TSS	132.14	2024 European Championships
Free skating	TES	69.09	2024 European Championships
Free skating	PCS	63.05	2024 European Championships

=== Pair skating with Matteo Guarise ===
Results in the 2022–23 season
Date	Event	SP		FS		Total	
Date	Event	P	Score	P	Score	P	Score
Nov 17–20, 2022	(Poland) 2022 CS Warsaw Cup	4	60.71	4	105.79	4	166.50
Dec 15–18, 2022	(Italy) 2023 Italian Championships	3	64.98	3	112.01	3	176.99
Jan 25–29, 2023	(Finland) 2023 European Championships	8	53.29	7	99.25	7	152.54

Results in the 2023–24 season
Date	Event	SP		FS		Total	
Date	Event	P	Score	P	Score	P	Score
Sep 8–10, 2023	(Italy) 2023 CS Nebelhorn Trophy	2	66.94	5	118.12	4	185.06
Sep 20–23, 2023	(Germany) 2023 CS Nebelhorn Trophy	3	66.36	1	125.35	1	191.71
Oct 27–29, 2023	2023 Skate Canada International	2	65.83	4	115.59	3	181.42
Nov 24–26, 2023	(Japan) 2023 NHK Trophy	2	66.77	2	123.54	2	190.31
Dec 22–23, 2023	(Italy) 2024 Italian Championships	1	70.99	2	121.04	2	191.13
Jan 8–14, 2024	(Lithuania) 2024 European Championships	3	67.05	1	132.14	1	199.19
Feb 22–25, 2024	(Netherlands) 2024 International Challenge Cup	2	62.22	2	113.19	2	175.41
Mar 18–24, 2024	(Canada) 2024 World Championships	8	66.12	9	119.28	9	185.40

Results in the 2024–25 season
Date	Event	SP		FS		Total	
Date	Event	P	Score	P	Score	P	Score
Oct 3–5, 2024	(China) 2024 Shanghai Trophy	2	61.72	2	116.63	2	178.35

Results in the 2025–26 season
Date	Event	SP		FS		Total	
Date	Event	P	Score	P	Score	P	Score
Sep 25–27, 2025	(Germany) 2025 CS Nebelhorn Trophy	7	62.96	7	118.26	7	181.22
Oct 8–11, 2025	(Georgia (country)) 2025 CS Trialeti Trophy	6	56.10	7	103.92	7	160.02
Oct 24–26, 2025	2025 Cup of China	8	55.67	–	–	–	WD

=== Single skating ===
==== Senior level ====
2021–2022 season
Date	Event	SP	FS	Total
February 5–6, 2022	Merano Cup	1; 58.55	3; 96.68	2; 155.23
January 1–13, 2022	IceLab International Cup	1; 60.38	1; 94.71	1; 155.09
December 4–5, 2021	2022 Italian Nationals	4; 54.64	6; 76.93	6; 131.57
November 5–7, 2021	2021 Gran Premio d'Italia	12; 53.35	12; 94.94	12; 148.29
2020–2021 season
Date	Event	SP	FS	Total
April 29 - May 2, 2021	Enga Spring Trophy	2; 56.74	1; 109.40	1; 166.14
12–13 December 2020	2021 Italian Championships	2; 61.67	3; 106.06	3; 167.73
2019–2020 season
Date	Event	SP	FS	Total
12–18 February 2020	2020 Sofia Trophy	2; 58.05	2; 110.71	2; 168.76
8–12 January 2020	2020 EduSport Trophy	1; 63.01	1; 119.85	1; 182.86
12–15 December 2019	2020 Italian Championships	2; 62.44	4; 106.06	4; 168.50
4–7 December 2019	2019 Golden Spin of Zagreb	9; 53.83	6; 113.34	7; 167.17
14–17 November 2019	2019 Warsaw Cup	11; 54.36	10; 105.85	11; 160.21
17–20 October 2019	2019 Halloween Cup	1; 59.14	1; 100.59	1; 159.73
13–15 September 2019	2019 Lombardia Trophy	7; 55.16	7; 112.04	7; 167.94
2018–2019 season
Date	Event	SP	FS	Total
13–16 December 2018	2019 Italian Championships	1; 58.57	4; 99.09	2; 157.66

==== Junior level ====
2019–2020 season
Date	Event	SP	FS	Total
1–3 November 2019	2019 IceLab Cup	2; 55.02	7; 84.77	4; 139.79
18–21 September 2019	2019 JGP Poland	20; 43.18	15; 85.61	16; 128.79
2018–2019 season
Date	Event	SP	FS	Total
4–10 March 2019	2019 World Junior Championships	8; 57.70	17; 89.33	16; 147.03
13–14 February 2019	2019 European Youth Olympic Festival	2; 58.91	2; 114.78	2; 173.69
5–9 February 2019	2019 Bavarian Open (Group I)	3; 52.85	3; 103.79	3; 156.64
9–12 January 2019	2019 EduSport Trophy	1; 54.81	1; 104.14	1; 158.95
27 November - 2 December 2018	2018 Denkova-Staviski Cup	1; 60.74	1; 105.32	1; 166.06
23–25 November 2018	2018 Warshaw Cup	1; 50.19	1; 86.85	1; 137.04
25–28 October 2018	2018 Golden Bear	2; 61.82	3; 110.66	3; 172.48
3–6 October 2018	2018 JGP Slovenia	15; 42.91	15; 76.42	15; 119.33
5–8 September 2018	2018 JGP Lithuania	5; 54.49	9; 94.92	7; 149.41
2017–2018 season
Date	Event	SP	FS	Total
5–11 March 2018	2018 World Junior Championships	23; 46.46	11; 100.99	16; 147.45
23–27 January 2018	2018 Skate Helena	1; 47.60	1; 100.40	1; 148.00
13–16 December 2017	2018 Italian Junior Championships	1; 60.25	1; 105.19	1; 165.44
20–25 November 2017	2017 Cup of Tyrol	3; 49.83	2; 89.84	2; 139.67
15–19 November 2017	2017 Merano Cup	1; 50.96	1; 101.98	1; 152.94
26–29 October 2017	2017 Golden Bear	4; 48.12	1; 93.87	2; 141.99
11–15 October 2017	2017 Cup of Nice	6; 47.33	6; 87.15	7; 134.48
20–23 September 2017	2017 JGP Belarus	13; 43.17	6; 93.47	7; 136.64
