= Cup of Tyrol =

International figure skating competition

- Status: Inactive
- Genre: International competition
- Frequency: Annual
- Venue: Tyrolean Ice Arena
- Location: Innsbruck
- Country: Austria
- Inaugurated: 2016
- Most recent: 2019
- Organiser: Union Eislaufschule Innsbruck & Skate Austria

The Cup of Tyrol was an annual figure skating competition sanctioned by the International Skating Union (ISU), organized and hosted by the Union Eislaufschule Innsbruck and Skate Austria at the Tyrolean Ice Arena in Innsbruck. The competition debuted in 2016. Medals were awarded in men's singles, women's singles, and pair skating at the senior and junior levels, although the pairs event was only held in 2016 and 2017. The 2020 Cup of Tyrol was intended to be an ISU Challenger Series event, but was cancelled due to the COVID-19 pandemic. The 2019 Cup of Tyrol was the last iteration of this event to be held.

== Senior medalists ==
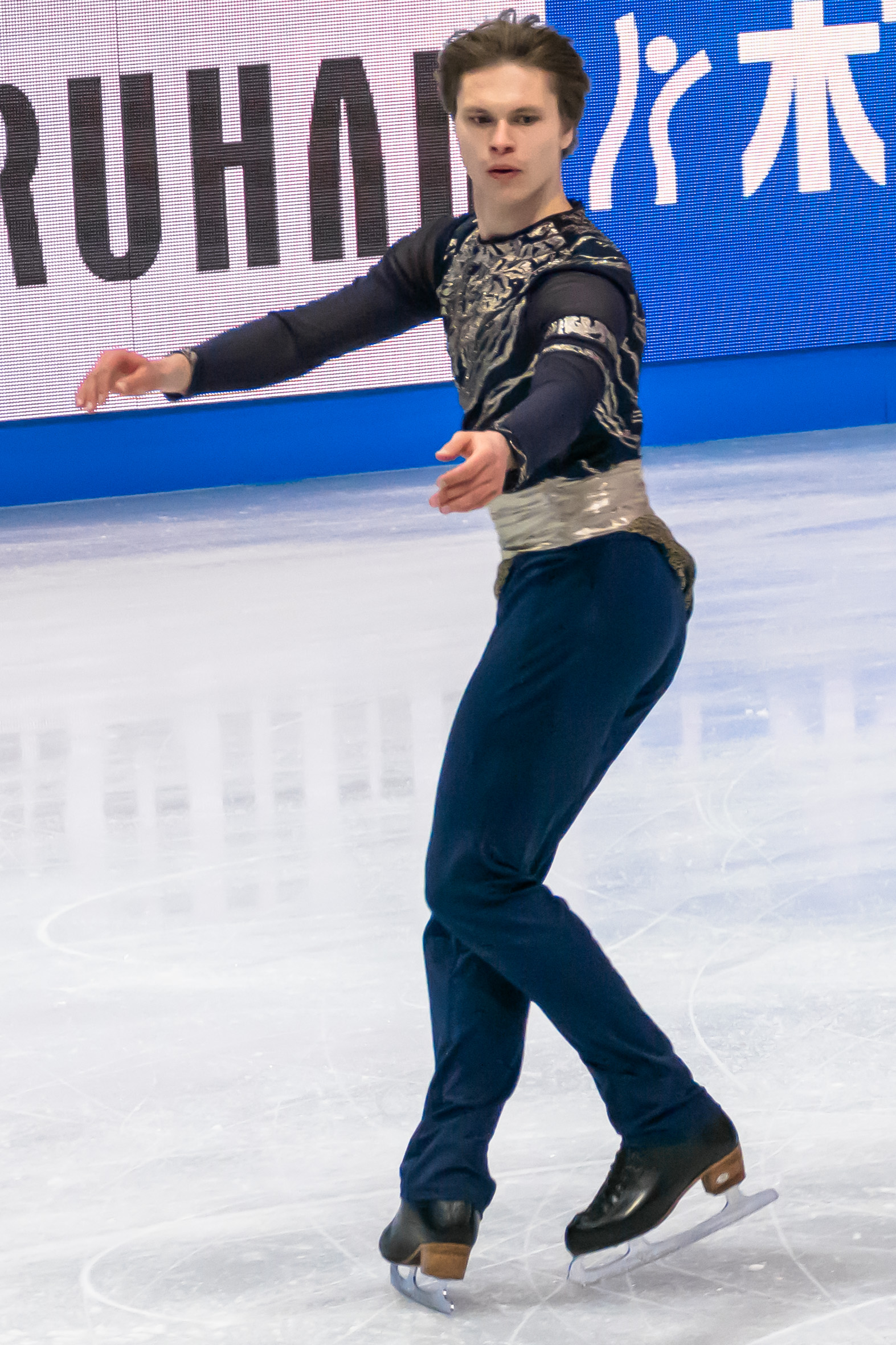
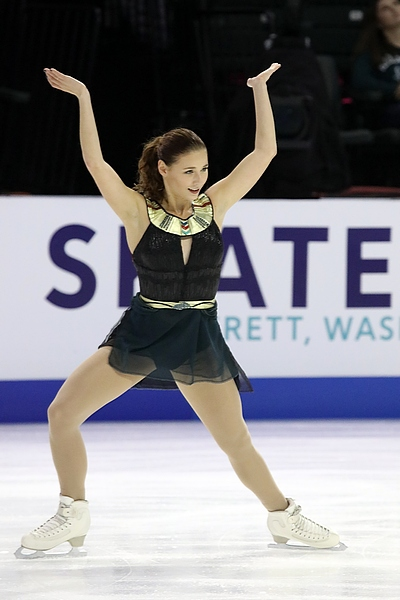
The 2019 Cup of Tyrol champions: Deniss Vasiļjevs of Latvia (women's singles) and Laurine Lecavelier of France (women's singles)

=== Men's singles ===
Men's event medalists
Year	Gold	Silver	Bronze	Ref.
2016	(France) Chafik Besseghier	(Italy) Maurizio Zandron	(Finland) Valtter Virtanen	
2017	(Latvia) Deniss Vasiļjevs	(Israel) Alexei Bychenko	(Israel) Daniel Samohin	
2018	(Latvia) Deniss Vasiļjevs	(Italy) Matteo Rizzo	(France) Chafik Besseghier	
2019	(Latvia) Deniss Vasiļjevs	(Austria) Maurizio Zandron	(Russia) Egor Murashov	
2020	Cancelled due to the COVID-19 pandemic			

=== Women's singles ===
Women's event medalists
Year	Gold	Silver	Bronze	Ref.
2016	(Russia) Yulia Lipnitskaya	(France) Laurine Lecavelier	(Sweden) Isabelle Olsson	
2017	(France) Laurine Lecavelier	(Italy) Micol Cristini	(Slovenia) Daša Grm	
2018	(Italy) Giada Russo	(Latvia) Diāna Ņikitina	(Norway) Anne Line Gjersem	
2019	(France) Laurine Lecavelier	(Germany) Nicole Schott	(Italy) Marina Piredda	
2020	Cancelled due to the COVID-19 pandemic			

=== Pairs ===
Pairs' event medalists
Year	Gold	Silver	Bronze	Ref.
2016	(Russia); Vera Bazarova; Andrei Deputat	(France); Vanessa James; Morgan Ciprès	(North Korea); Ryom Tae-ok; Kim Ju-sik	
2017	(Austria); Miriam Ziegler; Severin Kiefer	(Russia); Alisa Efimova; Alexander Korovin	(Germany); Minerva Hase; Nolan Seegert	
2018–19	No pairs competitions			
2020	Cancelled due to the COVID-19 pandemic			

== Junior results ==
=== Men's singles ===
Junior men's event medalists
Year	Gold	Silver	Bronze	Ref.
2016	(Italy) Nik Folini	(Italy) Daniel Grassl	(Italy) Manuel Piazza	
2017	(Russia) Mikhail Udalov	(Russia) Ilya Yablokov	(Italy) Nik Folini	
2018	(Germany) Jonathan Hess	(Germany) Isaak Droysen	(Czech Republic) Filip Scerba	
2019	(Russia) Ilya Yablokov	(Italy) Gabriele Frangipani	(Italy) Nikolaj Memola	

=== Women's singles ===
Junior women's event medalists
Year	Gold	Silver	Bronze	Ref.
2016	(Austria) Alisa Stomakhina	(Italy) Doris Pircher	(Finland) Joanna Kallela	
2017	(Austria) Alisa Stomakhina	(Italy) Marina Piredda	(Germany) Ann-Christin Marold	
2018	(Germany) Ann-Christin Marold	(Italy) Lucrezia Beccari	(Switzerland) Noémie Bodenstein	
2019	(Italy) Alessia Tornaghi	(Germany) Anastasia Steblyanka	(Italy) Anna Memola	

=== Pairs ===
Junior pairs event medalists
Year	Gold	Silver	Bronze	Ref.
2016	No pairs competition			
2017	(Israel); Hailey Esther Kops; Artem Tsoglin	(Germany); Lena Kreitmeier; Anton Kempf	(Austria); Heidrun Pipal; Erik Pipal	
2018	(Germany); Talisa Thomalla; Robert Kunkel	(Czech Republic); Edita Hornaková; Radek Jakubka	No other competitors	
2019	No pairs competition			

== Cumulative medal count (senior medalists) ==
=== Men's singles ===
Total number of Cup of Tyrol medals in men's singles by nation
Rank	Nation	Gold	Silver	Bronze	Total
1	Latvia	3	0	0	3
2	France	1	0	1	2
3	Italy	0	2	0	2
4	Israel	0	1	1	2
5	Austria	0	1	0	1
6	Finland	0	0	1	1
6	Russia	0	0	1	1
Totals (7 entries)		4	4	4	12

=== Women's singles ===
Total number of Cup of Tyrol medals in women's singles by nation
Rank	Nation	Gold	Silver	Bronze	Total
1	France	2	1	0	3
2	Italy	1	1	1	3
3	Russia	1	0	0	1
4	Germany	0	1	0	1
4	Latvia	0	1	0	1
6	Norway	0	0	1	1
6	Slovenia	0	0	1	1
6	Sweden	0	0	1	1
Totals (8 entries)		4	4	4	12

=== Pairs ===
Total number of Cup of Tyrol medals in pair skating by nation
Rank	Nation	Gold	Silver	Bronze	Total
1	Russia	1	1	0	2
2	Austria	1	0	0	1
3	France	0	1	0	1
4	Germany	0	0	1	1
4	North Korea	0	0	1	1
Totals (5 entries)		2	2	2	6
