= Edoardo De Bernardis =

Italian figure skating coach

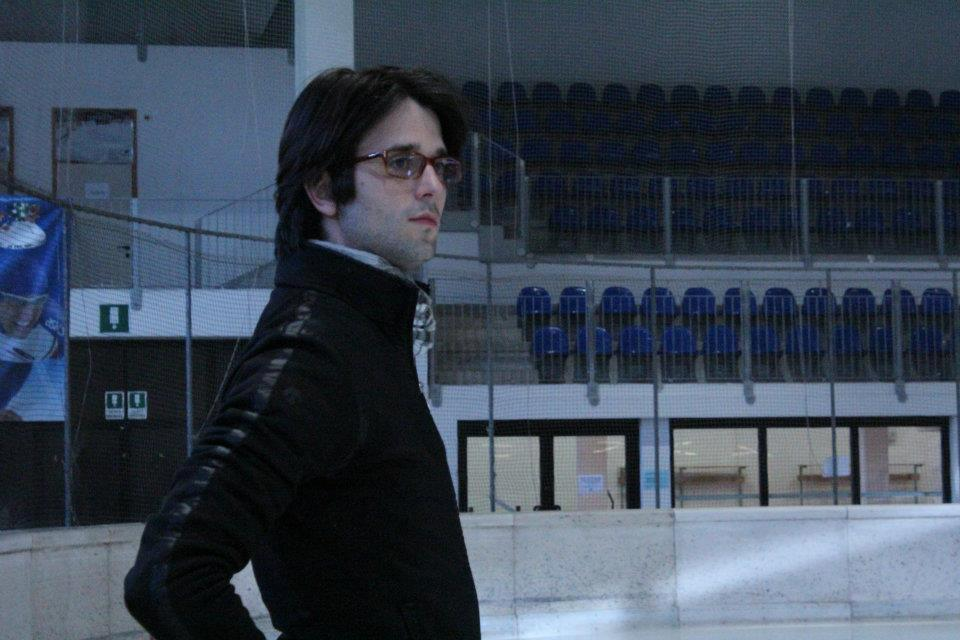

Personal information
- Born: 27 May 1978 (age 48) Turin, Italy

Figure skating career
- Country: Italy

Edoardo De Bernardis (born 27 May 1978 in Turin) is an Italian figure skating olympic coach and choreographer.

== Career ==
De Bernardis has coached athletes of international and Olympic calibre. He advises technically and artistically Italian, German, Slovak, Finnish, Swiss and Greek athletes from National teams. He works in Turin, Pinerolo, Milan, Los Angeles and Mannheim.

He has been a coach and choreographer to Karel Zelenka the Italian national champion, Carolina Kostner world and European champion, Paolo Bacchini Italian silver medalist, Giada Russo two times Italian National Champion (2015-2016), junior champion in the 2011 and senior bronze medalist in the 2012, he is the former coach of the Italian junior champion Lucrezia Beccari. He choreographed also some programmes to the olympic skater Sarah Hecken, Nathalie Weinzierl, also to Antonio Panfili world junior and grand prix competitor and Anais Coraducci from the swiss team. De Bernardis coached the two-time Finnish junior national champion Sofia Sula. He trained the world champions in roll skating pair Marika Zanforlin and Federico Degli Esposti. He has worked with famous coaches such as Christa Fassi, Frank Carroll, Joanna Szczypa and Piotr Sczypa. Events at which he has coached include the World Figure Skating Championships, the ISU Grand Prix of Figure Skating and the European Figure Skating Championships. He is now the coach and choreographer of the international competitor Sara Casella and of the Italian Junior Champion 2015, 2016 and European 2017 ISU competitor Lucrezia Gennaro. He is the coach and the choreographer of the two times italian national champion Alessia Tornaghi. De Bernardis is the coach of Raffaele Francesco Zich, Italian Junior National Champion in the 2021.

In 2023 he started coaching the 3 times spanish national champion Tomas Guarino and the European silver medalist Daniel Grassl. In the 2026 he takes part at the Olympics in Milano Cortina as a coach for Spain and Italy. With the Italian team he wins the bronze medal at the Team Event.

== Training ==
He received his training in the United States at Carlo Fassi's school in Lake Arrowhead, California under coaches of the calibre of Christa Fassi and Irina Rodnina. Since his young age he was part of the Italian National team, he won National titles. He was mentioned as a probable competitor for the Olympic Games in Nagano in the 1998. After a knee surgery he stopped competing. He received specialised artistic training at the Accademia del Teatro Nuovo in Turin, where he studied acting, dance and physical expression. He took part of many skating seminar as an International Technical Specialist of the ISU Judging System. He holds a degree in Sociology took at the University of Turin.
