= 2014 CS Finlandia Trophy =

Figure skating competition

2014 Finlandia Trophy
- Type: ISU Challenger Series
- Date: October 9 – 12
- Season: 2014–15
- Location: Espoo
- Host: Finnish Figure Skating Association
- Venue: Barona Arena

Champions
- Men's singles: (Russia) Sergei Voronov
- Ladies' singles: (Russia) Elizaveta Tuktamysheva
- Ice dance: (Russia) Alexandra Stepanova / Ivan Bukin
- Previous: 2013 Finlandia Trophy
- Next: 2015 CS Finlandia Trophy

The 2014 Finlandia Trophy was a senior international figure skating competition in the 2014–15 season. A part of the 2014–15 ISU Challenger Series, the 19th edition of the annual event was held on October 9–12, 2014 at the Barona Arena in Espoo. Medals were awarded in the disciplines of men's singles, ladies' singles, ice dancing, and synchronized skating.

== Entries ==
The entries are:

Country	Men	Ladies	Ice dancing	Synchronized skating
Czech Republic		Eliška Březinová		
Denmark	Justus Strid			
Estonia		Helery Halvin; Svetlana Issakova		
Finland	Tomi Pulkkinen; Matthias Versluis; Valtter Virtanen; Viktor Zubik	Liubov Efimenko; Rosaliina Kuparinen; Jenni Saarinen; Juulia Turkkila	Olesia Karmi / Max Lindholm; Henna Lindholm / Ossi Kanervo; Cecilia Törn / Jussiville Partanen	Marigold IceUnity; Revolutions; Rockettes; Team Unique
Germany	Franz Streubel		Nelli Zhiganshina / Alexander Gazsi	
Italy		Carol Bressanutti		
Israel	Alexei Bychenko		Allison Reed / Vasili Rogov	
Japan		Rika Hongo		
Latvia		Ieva Gaile; Kristine Gaile		
Luxembourg		Fleur Maxwell		
Mexico			Pilar Maekawa Moreno / Leonardo Maekawa Moreno	
Norway		Camilla Gjersem; Anine Rabe		
Russia	Alexander Petrov; Sergei Voronov	Maria Artemieva; Elizaveta Tuktamysheva	Alexandra Stepanova / Ivan Bukin	Paradise
Sweden		Isabelle Olsson		
Ukraine			Anastasia Galyeta / Avidan Brown	
United States	Adam Rippon	Samantha Cesario	Anastasia Cannuscio / Colin McManus	
Uzbekistan	Misha Ge			

== Results ==
=== Men ===
Rank	Name	Nation	Total points	SP		FS	
1	Sergei Voronov	Russia	221.11	1	75.06	2	146.05
2	Adam Rippon	United States	220.75	3	68.53	1	152.22
3	Alexander Petrov	Russia	214.50	2	73.29	3	141.21
4	Misha Ge	Uzbekistan	203.51	4	64.96	4	138.55
5	Alexei Bychenko	Israel	176.66	5	59.03	5	117.63
6	Valtter Virtanen	Finland	152.27	7	49.85	6	102.42
7	Justus Strid	Denmark	137.83	8	42.33	7	95.50
8	Viktor Zubik	Finland	132.71	6	50.98	8	81.73

=== Ladies ===
Rank	Name	Nation	Total points	SP		FS	
1	Elizaveta Tuktamysheva	Russia	193.31	1	67.05	1	126.26
2	Samantha Cesario	United States	159.40	5	50.79	2	108.61
3	Rika Hongo	Japan	153.71	3	52.11	3	101.60
4	Liubov Efimenko	Finland	146.58	2	56.21	7	90.37
5	Jenni Saarinen	Finland	144.16	6	48.55	4	95.61
6	Maria Artemieva	Russia	140.38	7	47.43	5	92.95
7	Juulia Turkkila	Finland	137.15	4	51.85	8	85.30
8	Fleur Maxwell	Luxembourg	135.94	10	45.51	6	90.43
9	Camilla Gjersem	Norway	126.87	8	47.30	11	79.57
10	Eliška Březinová	Czech Republic	125.86	9	46.19	10	79.67
11	Anine Rabe	Norway	120.27	11	43.50	12	76.77
12	Helery Hälvin	Estonia	119.19	13	36.95	9	82.24
13	Carol Bressanutti	Italy	108.49	14	36.92	13	71.57
14	Ieva Gaile	Latvia	104.28	15	36.62	14	67.66
15	Kristīne Gaile	Latvia	102.01	16	36.08	15	65.93
16	Emilia Toikkanen	Finland	90.28	12	37.67	16	52.61

=== Ice dancing ===
Rank	Name	Nation	Total points	SD		FD	
1	Alexandra Stepanova / Ivan Bukin	Russia	152.82	1	59.46	1	93.36
2	Nelli Zhiganshina / Alexander Gazsi	Germany	139.98	2	58.06	3	81.92
3	Anastasia Cannuscio / Colin McManus	United States	131.76	4	49.28	2	82.48
4	Henna Lindholm / Ossi Kanervo	Finland	119.76	5	45.64	4	74.12
5	Allison Reed / Vasili Rogov	Israel	115.50	7	41.90	5	73.60
6	Olesia Karmi / Max Lindholm	Finland	112.50	3	49.80	7	62.70
7	Cecilia Törn / Jussiville Partanen	Finland	106.62	8	40.60	6	66.02
8	Anastasia Galyeta / Avidan Brown	Ukraine	104.38	6	41.98	8	62.40
9	Pilar Maekawa Moreno / Leonardo Maekawa Moreno	Mexico	94.24	9	33.52	9	60.72

=== Synchronized skating ===
Rank	Name	Nation	Total (SP)
1	Marigold IceUnity	Finland	66.40
2	Paradise	Russia	59.53
3	Team Unique	Finland	59.21
4	Rockettes	Finland	58.50
5	Revolutions	Finland	46.11
