= Classic Romance =

Studio album by David Garrett
- Released: 2009
- Genre: Classical
- Label: Deag

David Garrett chronology
David Garrett (2009)	Classic Romance (2009)	Rock Symphonies (2010)

Classic Romance is a 2009 album by violinist David Garrett.

== Track listing ==
1. "Humoresque" (Instrumental)
2. "Méditation"
3. "None but the Lonely Heart" (Instrumental)
4. "Serenade"
5. "Zigeunerweisen – 1: Moderato"
6. "Zigeunerweisen – 2: Un peu plus lent"
7. "Zigeunerweisen – 3: Allegro molto vivace"
8. "Salut d'Amour"
9. "Vocalise"
10. "Mendelssohn Violin Concerto – 1: Allegro molto appassionato"
11. "Mendelssohn Violin Concerto – 2: Andante"
12. "Mendelssohn Violin Concerto – 3: Allegro molto vivace"

== Charts ==
=== Weekly charts ===
Chart (2009–2010)	Peak position
Austrian Albums (Ö3 Austria)	12
German Albums (Offizielle Top 100)	4
Swiss Albums (Schweizer Hitparade)	21

=== Year-end charts ===
Chart (2009)	Position
German Albums (Offizielle Top 100)	91
Chart (2010)	Position
German Albums (Offizielle Top 100)	37
