= Valtter Virtanen =

Finnish figure skater (born 1987)

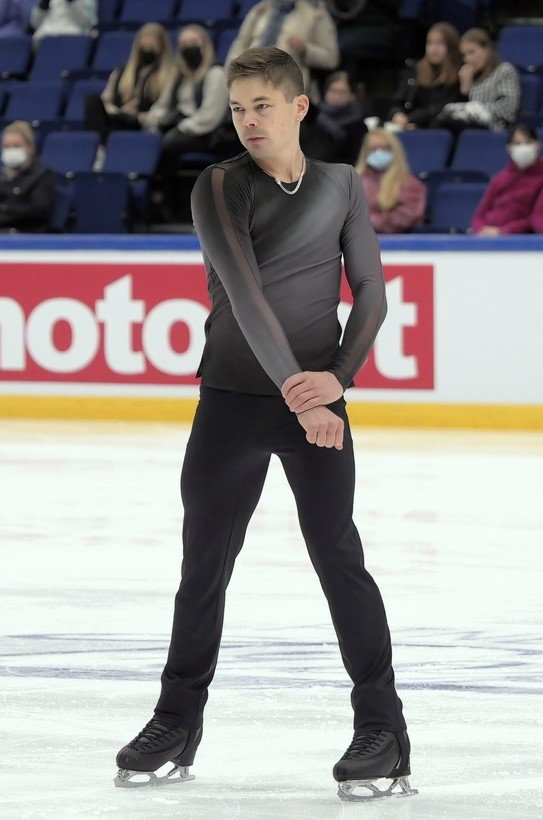
- Virtanen at the 2021 CS Finlandia Trophy

Personal information
- Born: 4 June 1987 (age 39) Kerava, Finland
- Home town: Jyväskylä, Finland & Oberstdorf, Germany
- Height: 1.72 m (5 ft 7 1/2 in)

Figure skating career
- Country: Finland
- Discipline: Men's singles
- Coach: Alina Mayer-Virtanen; Michael Huth
- Skating club: Peurunka Skating Academy Laukaa (PeSal)
- Began skating: 1992

Medal record
| Event | Gold medal – first place | Silver medal – second place | Bronze medal – third place |
| Finnish Championships | 8 | 8 | 3 |
Medal list
Finnish Championships
| Gold medal – first place | 2013 Joensuu | Singles |
| Gold medal – first place | 2015 Vantaa | Singles |
| Gold medal – first place | 2016 Mikkeli | Singles |
| Gold medal – first place | 2017 Tampere | Singles |
| Gold medal – first place | 2018 Kouvola | Singles |
| Gold medal – first place | 2022 Pori | Singles |
| Gold medal – first place | 2023 Joensuu | Singles |
| Gold medal – first place | 2025 Rauma | Singles |
| Silver medal – second place | 2006 Tampere | Singles |
| Silver medal – second place | 2007 Mikkeli | Singles |
| Silver medal – second place | 2009 Helsinki | Singles |
| Silver medal – second place | 2011 Turku | Singles |
| Silver medal – second place | 2014 Espoo | Singles |
| Silver medal – second place | 2019 Kouvola | Singles |
| Silver medal – second place | 2020 Vantaa | Singles |
| Silver medal – second place | 2024 Helsinki | Singles |
| Bronze medal – third place | 2008 Rauma | Singles |
| Bronze medal – third place | 2010 Jyväskylä | Singles |
| Bronze medal – third place | 2026 Lahti | Singles |

Valtter Virtanen (born 4 June 1987) is a Finnish figure skater. He is a four-time Nordic medalist (gold in 2022, silver in 2016 and 2018, bronze in 2014) and an eight-time Finnish national champion (2013, 2015–2018, 2022–2023). He has competed at a total of seventeen ISU Championships, reaching the final segment on six occasions, at five European and one World Junior Championships. His best ISU Championship placement, fourteenth, came at the 2023 European Championships in Espoo.

== Personal life ==
Virtanen was born on 4 June 1987 in Kerava, Finland. After completing his studies in late 2015, he became a medical doctor at a hospital in Oberstdorf, Germany. He works part-time in the emergency room of the Hospital of Peurunka and is team doctor of Finnish hockey team, JYP Jyväskylä. He is also multilingual with the ability to speak Finnish, English, German, and Swedish fluently.

He married German figure skater Alina Mayer in July 2016. The couple's daughter, Lija, was born in January 2021.

In the summer of 2022, responding to an appeal from the Ukrainian Figure Skating Federation, Virtanen and his wife decided to help Ukrainian figure skater, Kyrylo Marsak, who was no longer able to train in Kyiv due to the Russian invasion of Ukraine. They allowed him to train at their skating club, the Peurunka Skating Academy in Laukaa, and Virtanen's wife became Marsak's new coach.

Virtanen's mother died from cancer in February 2023.

== Career ==
=== Early career ===
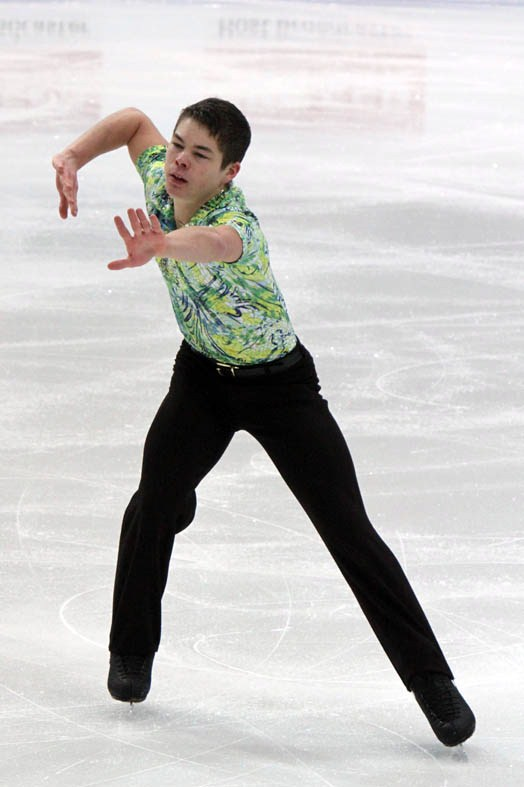
Virtanen at the 2011 European Championships

Virtanen began skating in 1992 at Keravan Luistinseura. His first skating coach was Liivo Rennik. As a junior, he competed at three consecutive World Junior Championships. He reached the final segment and finished twentieth overall at the 2005 Junior Worlds in Kitchener, Ontario, Canada. He moved up to the senior level during the 2006–07 figure skating season and subsequently won bronze at the 2008 and 2010 Finnish Championships and silver at the 2009 Finnish Championships.

Prior to the 2010–11 figure skating season, Virtanen left his longtime coach, Liivo Rennik, to begin training under Stefan Zins in Tampere. That season, after winning silver at the 2011 Finnish Championships, Virtanen was selected to compete at the European Championships for the first time, where he finished in thirty-third place.

=== 2012–13 season: First Finnish national title ===
Virtanen began the season by finishing twenty-second at the 2012 Nebelhorn Trophy, tenth at the 2012 Finlandia Trophy, fifteenth at the 2012 Cup of Nice, and fourteenth at the 2012 NRW Trophy.

In December, Virtanen won his first national title at the 2013 Finnish Championships. Selected to compete at the 2013 European Championships, Virtanen placed twenty-sixth in the short program, failing to advance to the free skate segment of the competition. The following month, he would finish seventh at the 2013 Nordic Championships, thirteenth at the 2013 Bavarian Open, third at the 2013 Hellmut Seibt Memorial, and seventh at the 2013 International Challenge Cup.

Following the season, Virtanen moved to Oberstdorf, Germany to train under Karel Fajfr.

=== 2013–14 season ===
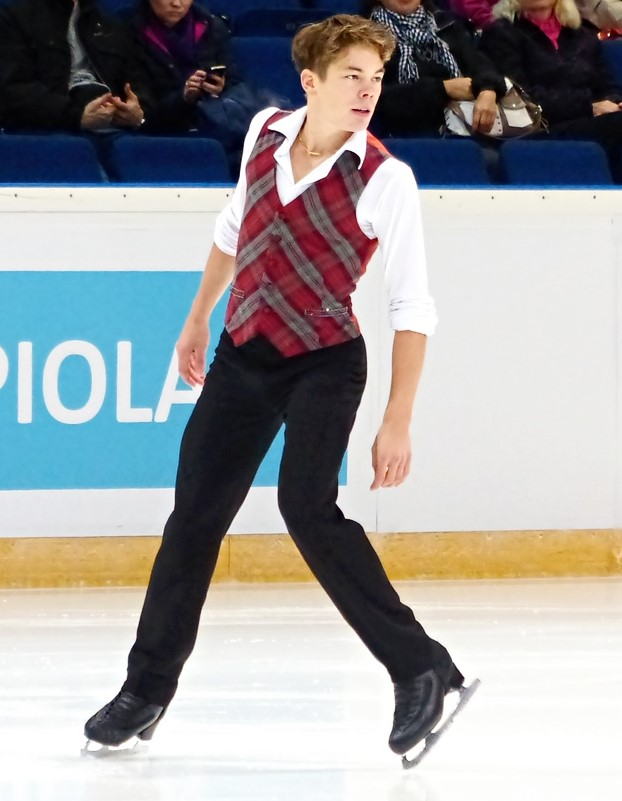
Virtanen at the 2013 Finlandia Trophy

Beginning the season at the 2013 Lombardia Trophy in mid-September, Virtanen placed twelfth. He would follow this up by finishing nineteenth at the 2013 Nebelhorn Trophy, twelfth at the 2013 Finlandia Trophy, thirteenth at the 2013 Cup of Nice, seventh at the 2013 Merano Cup, tenth at the 2013 Ice Challenge, and eleventh at the 2013 NRW Trophy.

Following a silver medal win at the 2014 Finnish Championships, Virtanen was selected to compete at the European Championships for a third time, where he finished in twenty-ninth place. One week later, he would compete at the 2014 Bavarian Open, where he finished eighth.

In late February, Virtanen made the podium at the Nordic Championships for the first time, taking the bronze medal. He would then close the season with a ninth-place finish at the 2014 International Challenge Cup.

=== 2014–15 season ===
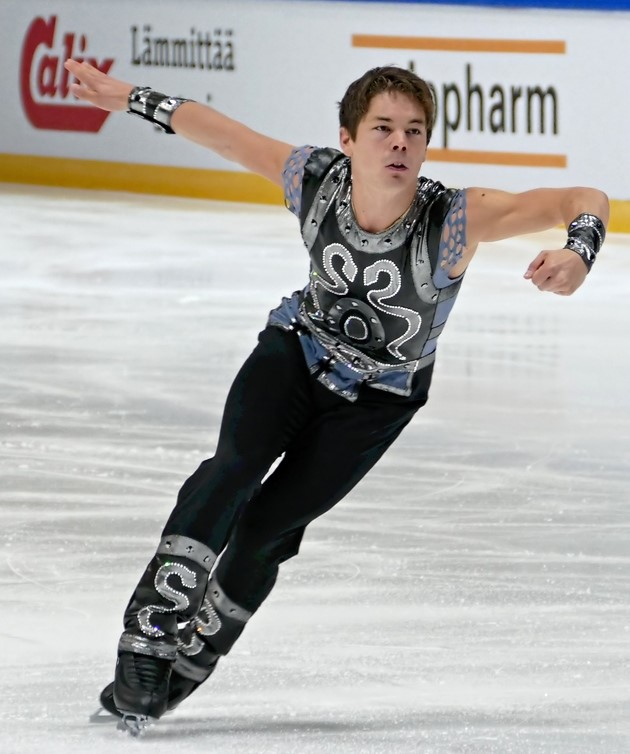
Virtanen at the 2014 CS Finlandia Trophy

Virtanen started the season by finishing sixth at the 2014 CS Finlandia Trophy. He would then go on to finish sixth at the 2014 Merano Cup and fifth at the 2014 NRW Trophy.

In December, Virtanen won his second national title at the 2015 Finnish Championships. Selected to compete at the 2015 European Championships, Virtanen finished eighteenth. He would subsequently compete at the 2015 Winter Universiade, where he placed fifteenth.

Virtanen finished the season by winning bronze at the 2015 Bavarian Open.

=== 2015–16 season ===
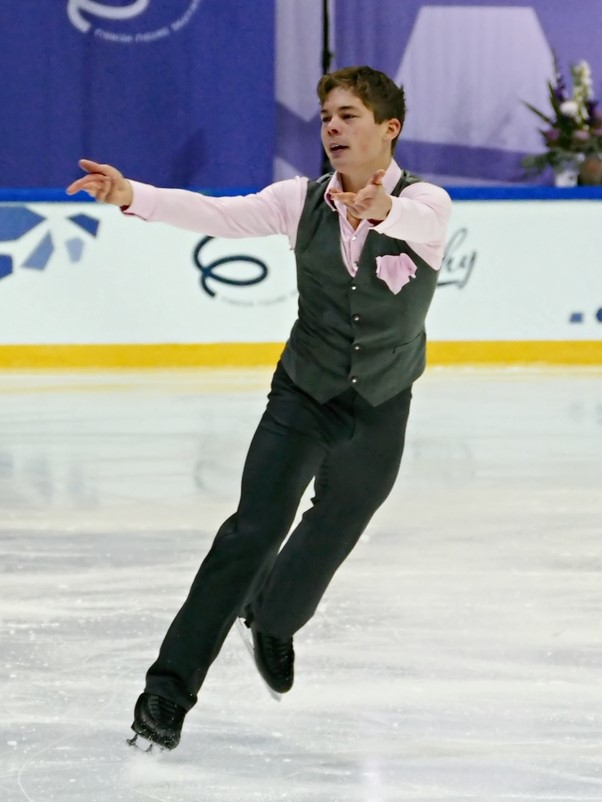
Virtanen at the 2015 CS Finlandia Trophy

Virtanen began the season by competing on the 2015–16 ISU Challenger Series, finishing twelfth at the 2015 CS Nebelhorn Trophy and the 2015 CS Finlandia Trophy. He would then subsequently finish fifteenth at the 2015 Cup of Nice and seventh at the 2015 NRW Trophy.

After winning his third national title at the Finnish Championships, Virtanen competed at the 2016 European Championships and placed twenty-sixth. He would then finish fifteenth at the 2016 Bavarian Open before closing the season by winning silver at the 2016 Nordic Championships and bronze at the 2016 Cup of Tyrol.

Following the season, Virtanen's wife, Alina Mayer-Virtanen, joined his coaching team.

=== 2016–17 season: World Championships debut ===
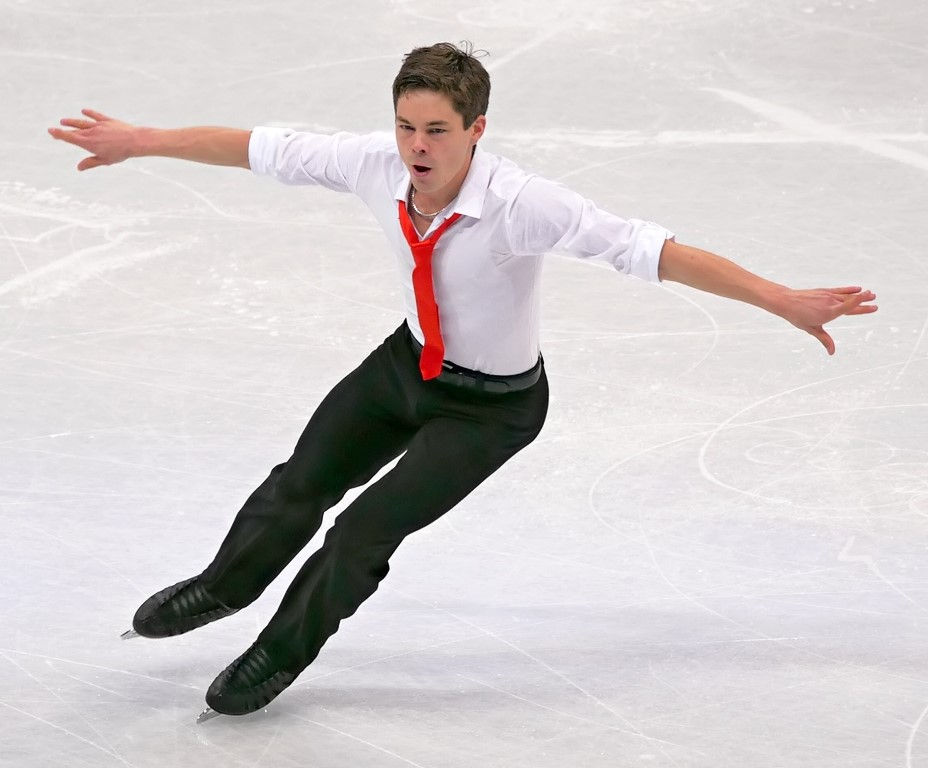
Virtanen at the 2017 World Championships

Virtanen started the season by finishing ninth at the 2016 Merano Cup. He then went on to place tenth at the 2016 CS Tallinn Trophy and fifth at the 2016 NRW Trophy. In December, he won his fourth national title at the 2017 Finnish Championships.

After finishing seventh at the 2017 Mentor Toruń Cup, Virtanen competed at the 2017 European Championships and finish in twenty-third place. He would follow this up by placing seventh at the 2017 Bavarian Open and tenth at the 2017 Cup of Tyrol.

Making his World Championship debut at the 2017 World Championships in Helsinki, Finland, he finished thirty-third.

=== 2017–18 season ===
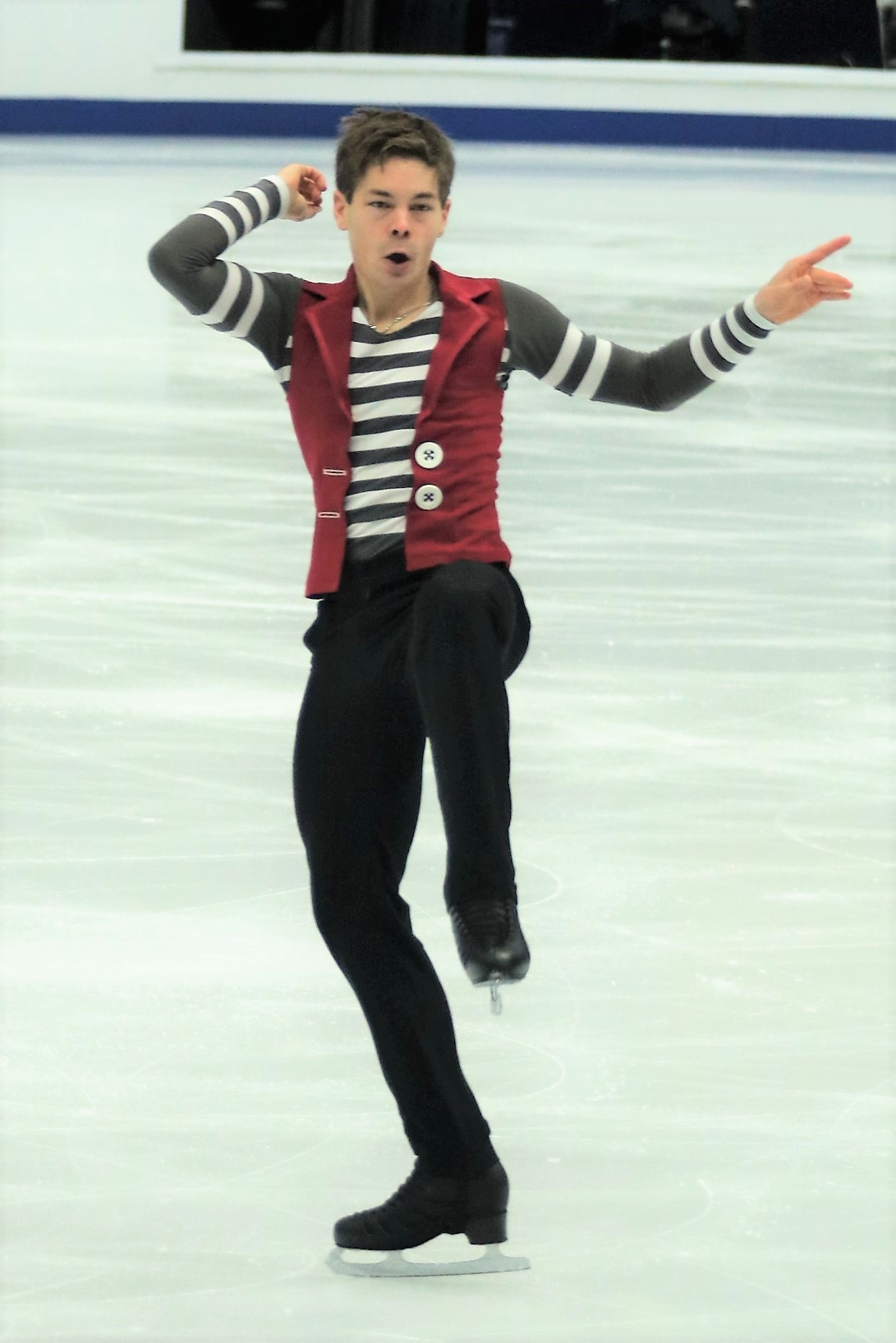
Virtanen at the 2018 European Championships

Prior to the season, Virtanen made a coaching change, going from Karel Fajfr to Jean-François Ballester and Marie Therese Kreiselmeyer. His wife, Alina, also continued coaching him.

He began the season by competing on the 2017–18 ISU Challenger Series, finishing seventeenth at the 2017 CS Lombardia Trophy, seventeenth at the 2017 CS Nebelhorn Trophy, and twelfth at the 2017 CS Finlandia Trophy. He would then go on to compete at the 2017 Merano Cup and the 2017 Cup of Tyrol, placing fourth and eighth, respectively.

In December, he won his fifth national title at the 2018 Finnish Championships and was ultimately selected to represent Finland at the European and World Championships.

At the 2018 European Championships in Moscow, Russia, Virtanen finished in nineteenth place. He would subsequently go on to finish fourth at the 2018 Bavarian Open, win silver at the 2018 Nordic Championships, and win bronze at the 2018 International Challenge Cup.

In March, he finished thirty-fifth at the 2018 World Championships in Milan, Italy.

=== 2018–19 season: Grand Prix debut ===
Virtanen began the season by competing on the 2018–19 ISU Challenger Series, finishing seventh at the 2018 CS Nebelhorn Trophy and nineteenth at the 2018 CS Finlandia Trophy. Due to the Chinese Skating Association declining to host their annual Grand Prix event, the Cup of China, the Finnish Figure Skating Association volunteered to host the event instead. As a result, Virtanen was selected as a host pick to compete at the 2018 Grand Prix of Helsinki. Making his senior Grand Prix debut at the event, Virtanen finished the event in eleventh place. He would also go on to place eleventh at the 2018 CS Inge Solar Memorial – Alpen Trophy.

In December, Virtanen's coach, Jean-François Ballester, unexpectedly died of a heart attack. Following Ballester's death, Virtanen posted on his Instagram, expressing that he hoped he could continue making Ballester proud. Shortly afterward, Virtanen won the silver medal at the 2019 Finnish Championships behind Roman Galay.

He subsequently competed at the 2019 Bavarian Open and the 2019 Cup of Tyrol, where he finished seventh and fifth, respectively. Selected to compete at the 2019 World Championships in Saitama, Japan, Virtanen placed thirty-second.

=== 2019–20 season ===
In August, it was announced that Virtanen would split his training time between working with his wife, Alina, in Peurunka, Finland, while also making trips to Oberstdorf, Germany to work with Michael Huth.

Virtanen began the season by finishing seventeenth at the 2019 CS Finlandia Trophy before placing fourth at the 2019 Golden Bear of Zagreb. Continuing to compete on the 2019–20 ISU Challenger Series, Virtanen finished sixteenth at the 2019 CS Warsaw Cup and twenty-fifth at the 2019 CS Golden Spin of Zagreb.

At the 2020 Finnish Championships, Virtanen again won the silver medal behind Roman Galay. He then finished the season by placing tenth at the 2020 Bavarian Open and fourteenth at the 2020 International Challenge Cup.

=== 2020–21 season ===
Virtanen started the season by competing at the 2020 CS Nebelhorn Trophy, where he finished thirteenth. He would subsequently place fifth at the 2020 NRW Trophy and the 2020 Tallink Hotels Cup.

Selected to compete at the 2021 World Championships in Stockholm, Sweden, Virtanen finished in thirty-first place.

=== 2021–22 season ===
Virtanen began the season by competing 2021–22 ISU Challenger Series, placing twenty-fourth at the 2021 CS Nebelhorn Trophy, nineteenth at the 2021 CS Finlandia Trophy, and eleventh at the 2021 CS Denis Ten Memorial Challenge. He subsequently finished fourth at the 2021 NRW Trophy and won silver at the 2021 Tallinn Trophy.

In December, Virtanen won the Finnish Championships for a sixth time. He would go on to compete at the 2022 European Championships in Tallinn, Estonia, where he placed nineteenth. Virtanen then finished up the season by finishing fourth at the 2022 Bavarian Open, winning gold at the 2022 Nordic Championships, winning bronze at the 2022 Jégvirág Cup, and finishing tenth at the 2022 International Challenge Cup.

=== 2022–23 season ===
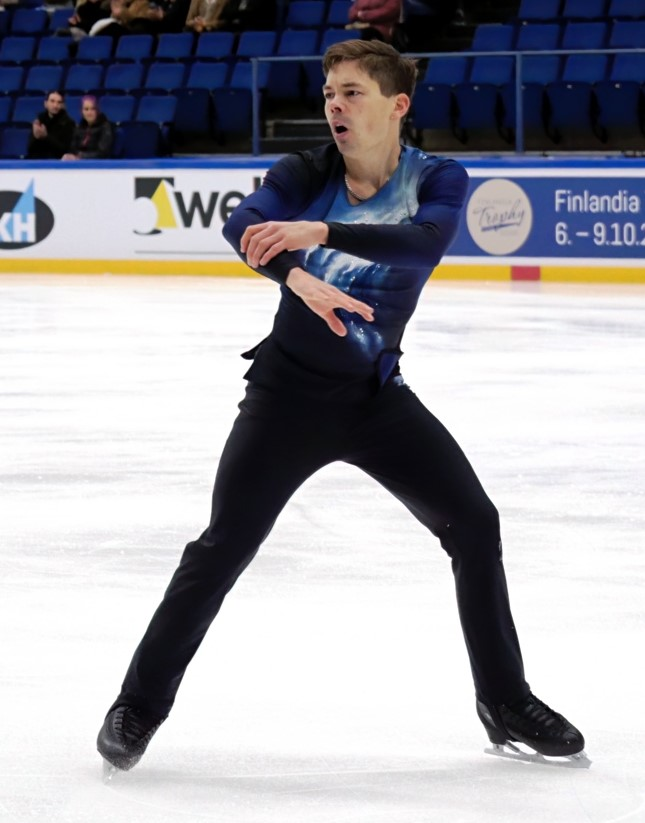
Virtanen at the 2022 CS Finlandia Trophy

Virtanen started the season by competing on the 2022–23 ISU Challenger Series, finishing twelfth at the 2022 CS Nebelhorn Trophy, fourteenth at the 2022 CS Finlandia Trophy, and thirteenth at the 2022 CS Warsaw Cup. Between the latter two events, Virtanen also finished fifth at the 2022 Volvo Open Cup.

Following the Russian invasion of Ukraine, Russia's annually held Grand Prix event, the Rostelecom Cup, was cancelled and replaced with the Grand Prix of Finland for an indefinite period. As a result, Virtanen was selected as the host nation's men's singles representative at the 2022 Grand Prix of Espoo. At the event, Virtanen finished in ninth place. Days later, he would place fourth at the 2022 Santa Claus Cup.

After winning his seventh national title at the 2023 Finnish Championships, Virtanen was selected to compete at the 2023 European Championships in Espoo, Finland. At the event, he finished in fourteenth place. He would subsequently win gold at the 2023 Bavarian Open, finish fifth at the 2023 Tallink Hotels Cup, and place tenth at the 2023 International Challenge Cup.

=== 2023–24 season ===
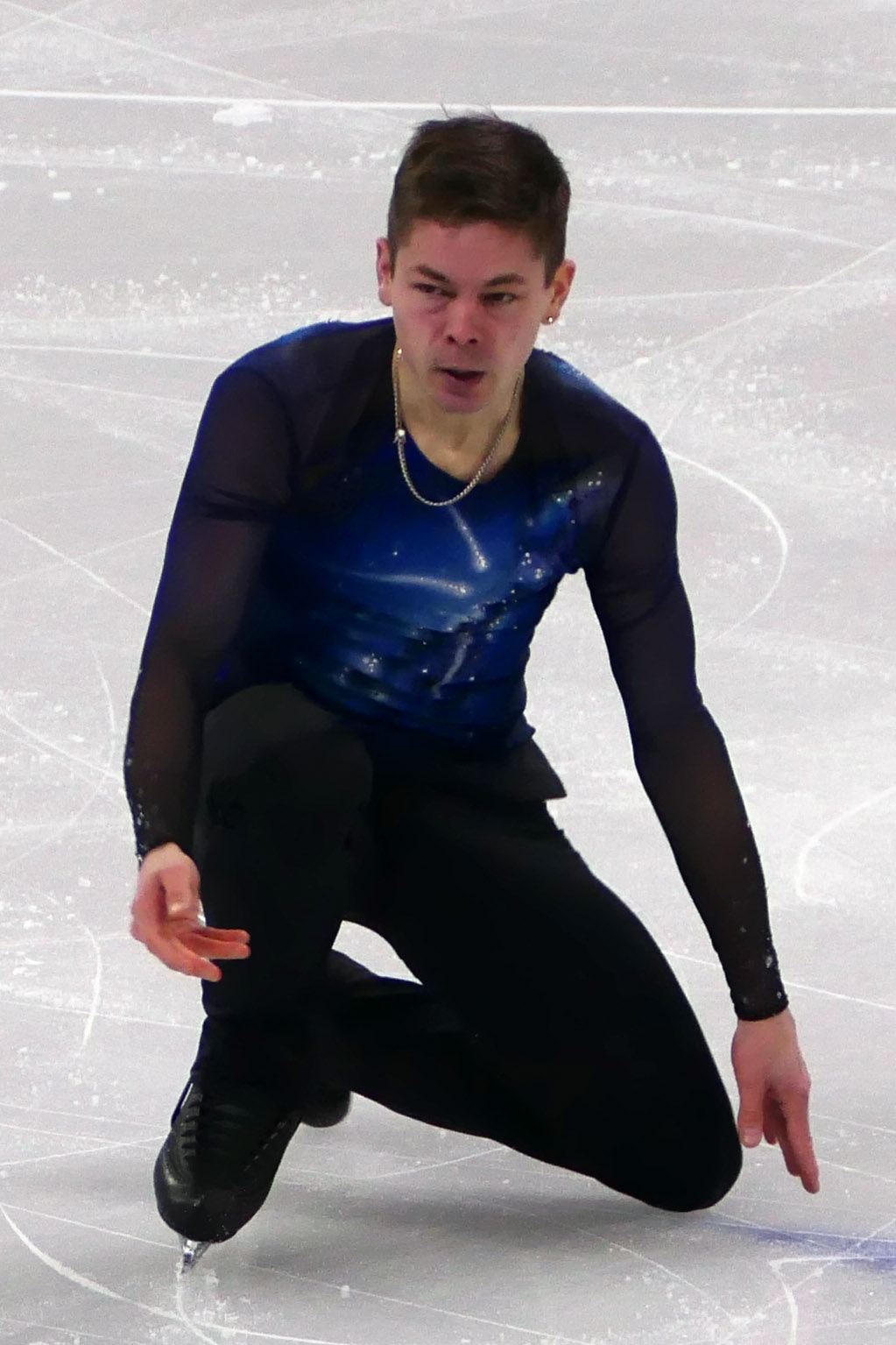
Virtanen at the 2024 World Championships

In June 2023, it was announced he was taking up pairs skating and pairing with Tilda Alteryd. However the partnership would come to an end in September 2023 due to Alteryd's difficulties with adapting to the new training environment in Finland. As a result, Virtanen returned to singles skating. His short program to the song "Saturn" by Sleeping at Last was dedicated to his mother, who had recently died.

Virtanen began competing in early November at the 2023 CS Denis Ten Memorial Challenge, where he placed eighth. While at the event, Virtanen was able to secure the technical minimum scores to compete at the World Championships. He subsequently competed at the 2023 CS Warsaw Cup and the 2023 Tallinn Trophy, finishing tenth and fourth, respectively.

In December, Virtanen placed second at the 2024 Finnish Championships behind Makar Suntsev. He would then subsequently finish tenth at the 2024 Bavarian Open and won the bronze medal at the 2024 Tallink Hotels Cup.

Due to Suntsev failing to obtain the minimum technical scores to compete at the 2024 World Championships in Montreal, Quebec, Canada, Virtanen was sent to the event. He finished thirty-fourth of the forty men competing at the event. Following the event, Virtanen said, "I am glad to have skated without big errors. I try to enjoy every moment like this because especially at my age it’s not clear when will be the last opportunity like this."

=== 2024–25 season ===
Virtanen started the season by competing at the 2024 CS Denis Ten Memorial Challenge and the 2024 Volvo Open Cup, where he finished tenth and ninth, respectively. Selected to compete at the Finnish Grand Prix event, the 2024 Finlandia Trophy, Virtanen came in eleventh place.

Following an eleventh-place finish at the 2024 CS Warsaw Cup, Virtanen went on to win his eighth national title at the 2025 Finnish Championships. He then placed fifth at the 2025 Bavarian Open.

Selected to compete at the 2025 European Championships in Tallinn, Estonia, Virtanen finished the event in twenty-fourth place. He then went on to win gold at the Union Trophy, silver at the 2025 Merano Ice Trophy, and silver at the 2025 Tallink Hotels Cup. Virtanen subsequently closed the season by placing fourth at the 2025 Bellu Memorial.

=== 2025–26 season ===
Virtanen opened the season by finishing fifth at the 2025 Robin Cousins Cup, twenty-first at the 2025 Skate to Milano, and fifth at the 2025 Volvo Open Cup.

Selected to compete at the Finnish Grand Prix event, the 2025 Finlandia Trophy, Virtanen finished the event in twelfth place.

== Programs ==
| Season | Short program | Free skating | Exhibition |
|---|---|---|---|
| 2025–2026 | A Stutter by Ólafur Arnalds ft. Arnór Dan choreo. by Adam Solya; Black Belt by Fabian Kreutzer choreo. by Ekaterina Ivleva | So Far by Ólafur Arnalds ft. Arnór Dan Arnarson; Öldurot by Ólafur Arnalds ft. Atli Örvarsson & SinfoniaNord choreo. by Ekaterina Ivleva | |
| 2024–2025 | Lay My Body Down (Orchestra Version) by Rag'n'Bone Man choreo. by Monica Lindfors | So Far by Ólafur Arnalds ft. Arnór Dan Arnarson; Öldurot by Ólafur Arnalds ft. Atli Örvarsson & SinfoniaNord choreo. by Ekaterina Ivleva | |
| 2023–2024 | Saturn by Sleeping at Last choreo. by Monica Lindfors | The Other Side of the Sea (Symphonic Tales) by Haevn choreo. by Adam Solya | |
| 2022–2023 | A Stutter by Ólafur Arnalds ft. Arnór Dan choreo. by Adam Solya | The Other Side of the Sea (Symphonic Tales) by Haevn choreo. by Adam Solya | Bensaa suonissa by Rauli Somerjoki; Don't Stop Me Now by Queen |
| 2021–2022 | Thule by Travis Lake; This Place Was A Shelter by Ólafur Arnalds choreo. by Adam Solya | Sail by Awolnation; We Are by Haevn choreo. by Adam Solya | |
| 2020–2021 | Thule by Travis Lake; This Place Was A Shelter by Ólafur Arnalds choreo. by Adam Solya | Sail by Awolnation; We Are by Haevn choreo. by Adam Solya | |
| 2019–2020 | Fall On Me - Ven a mi by Andrea Bocelli & Matteo Bocelli choreo. by Adam Solya | Minnie the Moocher; If I Only Had a Brain performed by Robbie Williams choreo. by Adam Solya | |
| 2018–2019 | Milonga de mis amores by Pedro Laurenz choreo. by Pierre Loup Bouquet | La Strada by Nino Rota choreo. by Rostislav Sinicyn | |
| 2017–2018 | Georgia on My Mind by Ray Charles choreo. by Frank Dehne | La Strada by Nino Rota choreo. by Rostislav Sinicyn | |
| 2016–2017 | Georgia on My Mind by Ray Charles choreo. by Frank Dehne | Valse triste by Jean Sibelius choreo. by Frank Dehne | Island Song by Zac Brown Band |
| 2015–2016 | La Vie en rose by Édith Piaf performed by Andrea Bocelli choreo. by Frank Dehne | Symphony No. 9 by Ludwig van Beethoven choreo. by Frank Dehne | |
| 2014–2015 | La Vie en rose by Édith Piaf performed by Andrea Bocelli choreo. by Frank Dehne | Alexander by Vangelis choreo. by Frank Dehne | |
| 2013–2014 | "Bei Mir Bistu Shein" performed by Hugo Strasser choreo. by Frank Dehne | Alexander by Vangelis choreo. by Frank Dehne | |
| 2012–2013 | Ain't No Sunshine; Harlem Nocturne choreo. by Stefan Zins | Kashmir; Who Wants to Live Forever by David Garrett choreo. by Stefan Zins | |
| 2011–2012 | Ain't No Sunshine; Harlem Nocturne choreo. by Stefan Zins | Kashmir; Who Wants to Live Forever by David Garrett choreo. by Stefan Zins | |
| 2010–2011 | Love in Venice by Edvin Marton; Summer Overture (from Requiem for a Dream) by Clint Mansell choreo. by Igor Liutikov | Le Jour d'Avant; Comptine d'un autre été : L'après-midi by Yann Tiersen choreo. by Igor Liutikov | |
| 2009–2010 | Love in Venice by Edvin Marton; Summer Overture (from Requiem for a Dream) by Clint Mansell choreo. by Igor Liutikov | Le Jour d'Avant; Comptine d'un autre été : L'après-midi by Yann Tiersen choreo. by Igor Liutikov | |
| 2008–2009 | Flamenco by Valery Mikhailovich Didula; Carlos (from Cirque Surreal) by Rick Wakeman choreo. by Viivi Virtanen, Lilli Hepi | Arthur; Catherine of Aragon; The Oracle; Sorry by Rick Wakeman choreo. by Viivi Virtanen, Lilli Hepi | |
| 2005–2006 | Elo 2: Moment of Truth; Eye in the Sky by The Alan Parsons Project choreo. by Markus Leminen, Galina Loutkov | Con Air by Mark Mancina & Trevor Rabin; The Rock by Nick Glennie-Smith & Hans Zimmer choreo. by Markus Leminen, Galina Loutkov | |
| 2004–2005 | Return to the Centre of the Earth by Rick Wakeman choreo. by Markus Leminen | Con Air by Mark Mancina & Trevor Rabin; The Rock by Nick Glennie-Smith & Hans Zimmer choreo. by Markus Leminen, Galina Loutkov | |
| 2003–2004 | Return to the Centre of the Earth by Rick Wakeman choreo. by Markus Leminen | Selection of Music by Dmitri Shostakovich choreo. by Tamara Selin | |

== Competitive highlights ==
- GP – Event of the ISU Grand Prix Series
- JGP – Event of the ISU Junior Grand Prix Series
- CS – Event of the ISU Challenger Series
- TBD – Assigned
- WD – Withdrew from competition
- C – Event was cancelled

Competition placements since the 2016–17 season
| Season | 2016–17 | 2017–18 | 2018–19 | 2019–20 | 2020–21 | 2021–22 | 2022–23 | 2023–24 | 2024–25 | 2025–26 | 2026–27 |
|---|---|---|---|---|---|---|---|---|---|---|---|
| World Championships | 33rd | 35th | 32nd | | 31st | | | 34th | | | |
| European Championships | 23rd | 19th | | | | 19th | 14th | | 24th | | |
| Finnish Championships | 1st | 1st | 2nd | 2nd | C | 1st | 1st | 2nd | 1st | 3rd | |
| GP Finland | | | 11th | | | | 9th | | 11th | 12th | |
| CS Alpen Trophy | | | 10th | | | | | | | | |
| CS Denis Ten Memorial | | | | | | 11th | | 8th | 10th | | |
| CS Finlandia Trophy | | 12th | 19th | 17th | | 19th | 14th | | | | |
| CS Golden Spin of Zagreb | | | | 25th | | | | | | 20th | |
| CS Lombardia Trophy | | 17th | | | | | | | | | |
| CS Nebelhorn Trophy | | 17th | 7th | | 13th | 24th | 12th | | | | |
| CS Tallinn Trophy | 10th | | | | | 2nd | | 4th | | 17th | |
| CS Trialeti Trophy | | | | | | | | | | | 11th |
| CS Warsaw Cup | | | | 16th | | | 13th | 10th | 11th | | |
| Bellu Memorial | | | | | | | | | 4th | | |
| Challenge Cup | | 3rd | | 14th | | 10th | 10th | | | | |
| Cup of Tyrol | 10th | 8th | 5th | | | | | | | | |
| Golden Bear of Zagreb | | | | 4th | | | | | | | |
| Jégvirág Cup | | | | | | 3rd | | | | | |
| Mentor Toruń Cup | 7th | | | | | | | | | | |
| Merano Cup | 9th | 4th | | | | | | | | | |
| Merano Ice Trophy | | | | | | | | | 2nd | | |
| Nordic Championships | | 2nd | | | | 1st | | | | | |
| Northern Lights Trophy | | | | | | | | | | | 2nd |
| NRW Trophy | 5th | | | | 5th | 4th | | | | | |
| Robin Cousins Cup | | | | | | | | | | 5th | |
| Santa Claus Cup | | | | | | | 4th | | | | |
| Skate to Milano | | | | | | | | | | 21st | |
| Tallink Hotels Cup | | | | | 5th | | 5th | 3rd | 2nd | | |
| Tallinn Open | | | | | | | | | | | 4th |
| Union Trophy | | | | | | | | | 1st | | |
| Volvo Open Cup (Note: Volvo Open Cup Fall) | | | | | | | 5th | | 9th | 5th | 6th |
| Volvo Open Cup (Note: Volvo Open Cup Spring) | | | | | | | | | | 3rd | |
| Bavarian Open | 7th | 4th | 7th | 10th | | 4th | 1st | 10th | 5th | | |

Competition placements since the 2006–07 season
| Season | 2006–07 | 2007–08 | 2008–09 | 2009–10 | 2010–11 | 2011–12 | 2012–13 | 2013–14 | 2014–15 | 2015–16 |
|---|---|---|---|---|---|---|---|---|---|---|
| European Championships | | | | | 33rd | | 26th | 29th | 18th | 26th |
| Finnish Championships | 2nd | 3rd | 2nd | 3rd | 2nd | 6th | 1st | 2nd | 1st | 1st |
| CS Finlandia Trophy | 8th | 10th | 13th | 17th | 13th | 18th | 10th | 12th | 6th | 12th |
| CS Nebelhorn Trophy | | | | | | 17th | 22nd | 19th | | 12th |
| Bavarian Open | | | | | | 6th | 13th | 8th | 3rd | 15th |
| Challenge Cup | | | | | | | 7th | 9th | | |
| Cup of Nice | 12th | | | 19th | | 17th | 15th | 13th | | 15th |
| Cup of Tyrol | | | | | | | | | | 3rd |
| Hellmut Seibt Memorial | | | | | | | 3rd | | | |
| Ice Challenge | | | | | | | | 10th | | |
| Lombardia Trophy | | | | | | | | 12th | | |
| Merano Cup | | | | | | | | 7th | 6th | |
| Mont Blanc Trophy | | | | | 6th | | | | | |
| Nordic Championships | 5th | 4th | 5th | 5th | 9th | 6th | 7th | 3rd | | 2nd |
| NRW Trophy | | | | | 14th | 14th | 14th | 11th | 5th | 7th |
| Ondrej Nepela Memorial | 5th | 12th | 16th | | | | | | | |
| Triglav Trophy | | | | | | 10th | | | | |
| Winter Universiade | | | 28th | | | | | | 15th | |

Competition placements at junior level
| Season | 2002–03 | 2003–04 | 2004–05 | 2005–06 |
|---|---|---|---|---|
| World Junior Championships | | 30th | 20th | 27th |
| Finnish Championships (Senior) | | | | 2nd |
| Finnish Championships (Junior) | 2nd | 2nd | 1st | |
| JGP Bulgaria | | | | 15th |
| JGP Germany | | | 14th | |
| JGP Hungary | | | 14th | |
| JGP Poland | | | | 16th |
| Nordic Championships | | 3rd | | 2nd |

== Detailed results ==
ISU personal best scores in the +5/-5 GOE System
| Segment | Type | Score | Event |
|---|---|---|---|
| Total | TSS | 204.02 | 2022 Grand Prix of Espoo |
| Short program | TSS | 69.34 | 2022 CS Nebelhorn Trophy |
| Short program | TES | 34.35 | 2022 CS Nebelhorn Trophy |
| Short program | PCS | 36.16 | 2023 CS Warsaw Cup |
| Free skating | TSS | 135.09 | 2023 CS Denis Ten Memorial Challenge |
| Free skating | TES | 64.49 | 2023 CS Denis Ten Memorial Challenge |
| Free skating | PCS | 73.16 | 2022 Grand Prix of Espoo |

ISU personal best scores in the +3/-3 GOE System
| Segment | Type | Score | Event |
|---|---|---|---|
| Total | TSS | 181.77 | 2018 European Championships |
| Short program | TSS | 60.37 | 2015 CS Nebelhorn Trophy |
| Short program | TES | 32.30 | 2015 CS Nebelhorn Trophy |
| Short program | PCS | 31.68 | 2016 CS Tallinn Trophy |
| Free skating | TSS | 121.54 | 2018 European Championships |
| Free skating | TES | 60.38 | 2018 European Championships |
| Free skating | PCS | 64.20 | 2016 CS Tallinn Trophy |

=== Senior level ===
Results in the 2005–06 season
| Date | Event | SP | | FS | | Total | |
| Date | Event | P | Score | P | Score | P | Score |
|---|---|---|---|---|---|---|---|
| Dec 10–12, 2005 | (Finland) 2006 Finnish Championships | 4 | —N/a | 1 | —N/a | 2 | 139.47 |

Results in the 2006–07 season
| Date | Event | SP | | FS | | Total | |
| Date | Event | P | Score | P | Score | P | Score |
|---|---|---|---|---|---|---|---|
| Sep 15–16, 2006 | (Slovakia) 2006 Ondrej Nepela Memorial | 8 | 36.04 | 5 | 75.61 | 5 | 111.65 |
| Oct 7–10, 2006 | (Finland) 2006 Finlandia Trophy | 8 | 45.54 | 8 | 88.34 | 8 | 133.88 |
| Nov 9–11, 2006 | (France) 2006 International Cup of Nice | 9 | 43.06 | 12 | 75.12 | 12 | 118.18 |
| Dec 8–10, 2006 | (Finland) 2007 Finnish Championships | 3 | —N/a | 2 | —N/a | 2 | 144.62 |
| Feb 8–11, 2007 | (Finland) 2007 Nordic Championships | 5 | 44.72 | 6 | 84.98 | 5 | 129.70 |

Results in the 2007–08 season
| Date | Event | SP | | FS | | Total | |
| Date | Event | P | Score | P | Score | P | Score |
|---|---|---|---|---|---|---|---|
| Sep 20–22, 2007 | (Slovakia) 2007 Ondrej Nepela Memorial | 14 | 40.77 | 12 | 80.27 | 12 | 121.04 |
| Oct 7–10, 2007 | (Finland) 2007 Finlandia Trophy | 12 | 41.40 | 9 | 91.95 | 10 | 133.35 |
| Dec 7–9, 2007 | (Finland) 2008 Finnish Championships | 3 | 51.34 | 2 | 108.69 | 3 | 160.03 |
| Feb 7–10, 2008 | (Iceland) 2008 Nordic Championships | 4 | 45.40 | 4 | 89.85 | 4 | 135.25 |

Results in the 2008–09 season
| Date | Event | SP | | FS | | Total | |
| Date | Event | P | Score | P | Score | P | Score |
|---|---|---|---|---|---|---|---|
| Oct 9–12, 2008 | (Finland) 2008 Finlandia Trophy | 14 | 44.62 | 13 | 86.51 | 13 | 131.13 |
| Nov 22–23, 2008 | (Slovakia) 2008 Ondrej Nepela Memorial | 20 | 39.28 | 15 | 73.11 | 16 | 112.39 |
| Dec 2008 | (Finland) 2009 Finnish Championships | 2 | 52.42 | 2 | 99.79 | 2 | 152.21 |
| Feb 6–8, 2009 | (Sweden) 2009 Nordic Championships | 6 | 38.31 | 5 | 75.13 | 5 | 113.44 |
| Feb 21–25, 2009 | (China) 2009 Winter Universiade | 21 | 48.27 | 28 | 75.65 | 28 | 123.92 |

Results in the 2009–10 season
| Date | Event | SP | | FS | | Total | |
| Date | Event | P | Score | P | Score | P | Score |
|---|---|---|---|---|---|---|---|
| Oct 8–11, 2009 | (Finland) 2009 Finlandia Trophy | 17 | 47.75 | 19 | 85.51 | 17 | 133.26 |
| Nov 4–8, 2009 | (France) 2009 International Cup of Nice | 18 | 49.25 | 19 | 81.89 | 19 | 131.14 |
| Dec 2009 | (Finland) 2010 Finnish Championships | 3 | 49.51 | 3 | 104.19 | 3 | 153.70 |
| Feb 4–7, 2010 | (Norway) 2010 Nordic Championships | 5 | 43.96 | 5 | 83.29 | 5 | 127.25 |

Results in the 2010–11 season
| Date | Event | SP | | FS | | Total | |
| Date | Event | P | Score | P | Score | P | Score |
|---|---|---|---|---|---|---|---|
| Oct 7–10, 2010 | (Finland) 2010 Finlandia Trophy | 12 | 40.95 | 13 | 71.93 | 13 | 112.88 |
| Dec 2–5, 2010 | (Germany) 2010 NRW Trophy | 10 | 52.93 | 16 | 92.64 | 14 | 145.57 |
| Dec 17–19, 2010 | (Finland) 2011 Finnish Championships | 3 | 51.42 | 2 | 107.26 | 2 | 158.68 |
| Jan 24–30, 2011 | (Switzerland) 2011 European Championships | —N/a | —N/a | (16) | (79.90) | 33 | —N/a |
| Feb 10–13, 2011 | (Norway) 2011 Nordic Championships | 8 | 44.58 | 9 | 92.33 | 9 | 136.91 |
| Feb 15–20, 2011 | (Italy) 2011 Mont Blanc Trophy | 6 | 50.96 | 7 | 89.87 | 6 | 140.83 |

Results in the 2011–12 season
| Date | Event | SP | | FS | | Total | |
| Date | Event | P | Score | P | Score | P | Score |
|---|---|---|---|---|---|---|---|
| Sep 22–24, 2011 | (Germany) 2011 Nebelhorn Trophy | 18 | 39.88 | 17 | 85.65 | 17 | 125.53 |
| Oct 7–9, 2011 | (Finland) 2011 Finlandia Trophy | 14 | 47.39 | 18 | 78.59 | 18 | 125.98 |
| Oct 26–30, 2011 | (France) 2011 International Cup of Nice | 20 | 44.90 | 17 | 87.15 | 17 | 132.05 |
| Nov 29 – Dec 4, 2011 | (Germany) 2011 NRW Trophy | 14 | 47.53 | 14 | 92.58 | 14 | 140.11 |
| Dec 16–18, 2011 | (Finland) 2012 Finnish Championships | 6 | 46.60 | 6 | 91.25 | 6 | 137.85 |
| Feb 1–5, 2012 | (Germany) 2012 Bavarian Open | 7 | 50.38 | 7 | 98.46 | 6 | 148.84 |
| Feb 9–12, 2012 | (Finland) 2012 Nordic Championships | 7 | 45.49 | 5 | 86.18 | 6 | 131.67 |
| Apr 4–8, 2012 | (Slovenia) 2012 Triglav Trophy | 7 | 48.99 | 10 | 79.75 | 10 | 128.74 |

Results in the 2012–13 season
| Date | Event | SP | | FS | | Total | |
| Date | Event | P | Score | P | Score | P | Score |
|---|---|---|---|---|---|---|---|
| Sep 26–29, 2012 | (Germany) 2012 Nebelhorn Trophy | 19 | 51.41 | 22 | 85.56 | 22 | 136.97 |
| Oct 5–7, 2012 | (Finland) 2012 Finlandia Trophy | 8 | 56.81 | 11 | 95.12 | 10 | 151.93 |
| Oct 24–28, 2012 | (France) 2012 International Cup of Nice | 16 | 49.83 | 15 | 99.88 | 15 | 149.71 |
| Dec 4–9, 2012 | (Germany) 2012 NRW Trophy | 10 | 58.79 | 15 | 108.36 | 14 | 167.15 |
| Dec 14–16, 2012 | (Finland) 2013 Finnish Championships | 1 | 60.36 | 1 | 106.74 | 1 | 167.10 |
| Jan 31 – Feb 3, 2013 | (Iceland) 2013 Nordic Championships | 5 | 50.57 | 7 | 92.34 | 7 | 142.91 |
| Jan 23–27, 2013 | (Croatia) 2013 European Championships | 26 | 48.41 | —N/a | —N/a | 26 | 48.41 |
| Feb 6–11, 2013 | (Germany) 2013 Bavarian Open | 19 | 48.80 | 13 | 109.56 | 13 | 158.36 |
| Feb 13–16, 2013 | (Austria) 2013 Hellmut Seibt Memorial | 5 | 51.54 | 3 | 113.84 | 3 | 165.38 |
| Feb 21–24, 2013 | (Netherlands) 2013 International Challenge Cup | 6 | 57.72 | 7 | 119.20 | 7 | 176.92 |

Results in the 2013–14 season
| Date | Event | SP | | FS | | Total | |
| Date | Event | P | Score | P | Score | P | Score |
|---|---|---|---|---|---|---|---|
| Oct 4–6, 2013 | (Finland) 2013 Finlandia Trophy | 11 | 53.90 | 12 | 97.67 | 12 | 151.57 |
| Oct 23–27, 2013 | (France) 2013 International Cup of Nice | 11 | 59.87 | 13 | 105.40 | 13 | 165.27 |
| Sep 19–22, 2013 | (Italy) 2013 Lombardia Trophy | 11 | 49.05 | 10 | 88.88 | 12 | 137.93 |
| Sep 25–28, 2013 | (Germany) 2013 Nebelhorn Trophy | 16 | 55.55 | 20 | 107.01 | 19 | 162.56 |
| Nov 15–17, 2013 | (Italy) 2013 Merano Cup | 7 | 56.13 | 8 | 104.24 | 7 | 160.37 |
| Nov 19–24, 2013 | (Austria) 2013 Ice Challenge | 6 | 51.72 | 11 | 98.09 | 10 | 149.81 |
| Dec 4–8, 2013 | (Germany) 2013 NRW Trophy | 12 | 52.60 | 9 | 107.09 | 11 | 159.69 |
| Dec 13–15, 2013 | (Finland) 2014 Finnish Championships | 2 | 56.35 | 2 | 106.78 | 2 | 163.13 |
| Jan 13–19, 2014 | (Hungary) 2014 European Championships | 29 | 48.55 | —N/a | —N/a | 29 | 48.55 |
| Jan 29 – Feb 2, 2014 | (Germany) 2014 Bavarian Open | 6 | 59.71 | 9 | 102.02 | 8 | 161.73 |
| Feb 27 – Mar 2, 2014 | (Sweden) 2014 Nordic Championships | 2 | 60.00 | 3 | 109.91 | 3 | 169.91 |
| Mar 6–9, 2014 | (Netherlands) 2014 International Challenge Cup | 7 | 52.93 | 9 | 87.41 | 9 | 140.34 |

Results in the 2014–15 season
| Date | Event | SP | | FS | | Total | |
| Date | Event | P | Score | P | Score | P | Score |
|---|---|---|---|---|---|---|---|
| Oct 9–12, 2014 | (Finland) 2014 CS Finlandia Trophy | 7 | 49.85 | 6 | 102.42 | 6 | 152.27 |
| Nov 14–16, 2014 | (Italy) 2014 Merano Cup | 6 | 47.81 | 5 | 103.71 | 6 | 151.52 |
| Nov 26–30, 2014 | (Germany) 2014 NRW Trophy | 4 | 60.84 | 5 | 115.95 | 5 | 176.79 |
| Dec 19–21, 2014 | (Finland) 2015 Finnish Championships | 1 | 63.68 | 1 | 117.22 | 1 | 180.90 |
| Jan 26 – Feb 1, 2015 | (Sweden) 2015 European Championships | 15 | 58.31 | 19 | 106.49 | 18 | 164.80 |
| Feb 3–8, 2015 | (Spain) 2015 Winter Universiade | 13 | 55.23 | 16 | 110.18 | 15 | 165.41 |
| Feb 11–15, 2015 | (Germany) 2015 Bavarian Open | 3 | 63.07 | 7 | 105.80 | 3 | 168.87 |

Results in the 2015–16 season
| Date | Event | SP | | FS | | Total | |
| Date | Event | P | Score | P | Score | P | Score |
|---|---|---|---|---|---|---|---|
| Sep 23–26, 2015 | (Germany) 2015 CS Nebelhorn Trophy | 11 | 60.37 | 11 | 108.51 | 12 | 168.88 |
| Oct 8–11, 2015 | (Finland) 2015 CS Finlandia Trophy | 14 | 52.82 | 12 | 101.78 | 12 | 154.60 |
| Oct 15–18, 2015 | (France) 2015 International Cup of Nice | 18 | 51.00 | 14 | 100.76 | 15 | 151.76 |
| Nov 24–29, 2015 | (Germany) 2015 NRW Trophy | 7 | 61.32 | 8 | 114.30 | 7 | 175.62 |
| Dec 18–20, 2015 | (Finland) 2016 Finnish Championships | 1 | 66.16 | 1 | 127.16 | 1 | 193.32 |
| Jan 25–31, 2016 | (Slovakia) 2016 European Championships | 26 | 52.07 | —N/a | —N/a | 26 | 52.07 |
| Feb 17–21, 2016 | (Germany) 2016 Bavarian Open | 17 | 47.00 | 11 | 105.58 | 15 | 152.58 |
| Feb 24–28, 2016 | (Denmark) 2016 Nordic Championships | 2 | 65.40 | 3 | 117.20 | 2 | 182.60 |
| Mar 9–13, 2016 | (Austria) 2016 Cup of Tyrol | 4 | 67.59 | 3 | 123.49 | 3 | 191.08 |

Results in the 2016–17 season
| Date | Event | SP | | FS | | Total | |
| Date | Event | P | Score | P | Score | P | Score |
|---|---|---|---|---|---|---|---|
| Nov 10–13, 2016 | (Italy) 2016 Merano Cup | 7 | 56.61 | 9 | 101.32 | 9 | 157.93 |
| Nov 19–27, 2016 | (Estonia) 2016 CS Tallinn Trophy | 10 | 58.22 | 12 | 115.14 | 10 | 173.36 |
| Nov 30 – Dec 4, 2016 | (Germany) 2016 NRW Trophy | 4 | 61.35 | 6 | 119.44 | 5 | 180.79 |
| Dec 15–16, 2016 | (Finland) 2017 Finnish Championships | 1 | 61.48 | 1 | 116.85 | 1 | 178.33 |
| Jan 10–15, 2017 | (Poland) 2017 Mentor Toruń Cup | 6 | 65.11 | 7 | 112.87 | 7 | 177.98 |
| Jan 25–29, 2017 | (Czech Republic) 2017 European Championships | 22 | 56.52 | 24 | 107.57 | 23 | 164.09 |
| Feb 14–19, 2017 | (Germany) 2017 Bavarian Open | 12 | 55.78 | 7 | 125.30 | 7 | 181.08 |
| Feb 28 – Mar 5, 2017 | (Austria) 2017 Cup of Tyrol | 12 | 60.00 | 11 | 116.87 | 10 | 176.87 |
| Mar 29 – Apr 2, 2017 | (Finland) 2017 World Championships | 33 | 59.45 | —N/a | —N/a | 33 | 59.45 |

Results in the 2017–18 season
| Date | Event | SP | | FS | | Total | |
| Date | Event | P | Score | P | Score | P | Score |
|---|---|---|---|---|---|---|---|
| Sep 14–17, 2017 | (Italy) 2017 CS Lombardia Trophy | 18 | 57.08 | 17 | 107.43 | 17 | 164.51 |
| Sep 27–30, 2017 | (Germany) 2017 CS Nebelhorn Trophy | 14 | 59.62 | 17 | 112.23 | 17 | 171.85 |
| Oct 6–8, 2017 | (Finland) 2017 CS Finlandia Trophy | 13 | 58.28 | 12 | 117.67 | 12 | 175.95 |
| Nov 15–19, 2017 | (Italy) 2017 Merano Cup | 5 | 56.11 | 4 | 17.53 | 4 | 173.64 |
| Nov 20–25, 2017 | (Austria) 2017 Cup of Tyrol | 7 | 64.03 | 10 | 123.75 | 8 | 187.78 |
| Dec 15–17, 2017 | (Finland) 2018 Finnish Championships | 2 | 55.79 | 1 | 117.48 | 1 | 173.27 |
| Jan 15–21, 2018 | (Russia) 2018 European Championships | 24 | 60.23 | 18 | 121.54 | 19 | 181.77 |
| Jan 26–31, 2018 | (Germany) 2018 Bavarian Open | 5 | 62.65 | 4 | 128.42 | 4 | 191.07 |
| Feb 1–4, 2018 | (Finland) 2018 Nordic Championships | 3 | 60.43 | 2 | 117.23 | 2 | 177.66 |
| Feb 23–25, 2018 | (Netherlands) 2018 International Challenge Cup | 4 | 68.31 | 3 | 131.79 | 3 | 200.10 |
| Mar 19–25, 2018 | (Italy) 2018 World Championships | 35 | 55.49 | —N/a | —N/a | 35 | 55.49 |

Results in the 2018–19 season
| Date | Event | SP | | FS | | Total | |
| Date | Event | P | Score | P | Score | P | Score |
|---|---|---|---|---|---|---|---|
| Sep 26–29, 2018 | (Germany) 2018 CS Nebelhorn Trophy | 7 | 58.29 | 8 | 104.56 | 7 | 162.85 |
| Oct 4–7, 2018 | (Finland) 2018 CS Finlandia Trophy | 16 | 59.18 | 21 | 93.99 | 19 | 153.17 |
| Nov 2–4, 2018 | (Finland) 2018 Grand Prix of Helsinki | 11 | 48.16 | 11 | 106.58 | 11 | 154.74 |
| Nov 11–18, 2018 | (Austria) 2018 CS Alpen Trophy | 10 | 62.16 | 11 | 118.80 | 10 | 180.96 |
| Dec 14–16, 2018 | (Finland) 2019 Finnish Championships | 2 | 64.34 | 1 | 123.54 | 2 | 187.88 |
| Feb 5–10, 2019 | (Germany) 2019 Bavarian Open | 6 | 61.93 | 6 | 112.22 | 7 | 174.15 |
| Feb 26 – Mar 3, 2019 | (Austria) 2019 Cup of Tyrol | 5 | 62.08 | 5 | 108.34 | 5 | 170.42 |
| Mar 18–24, 2019 | (Japan) 2019 World Championships | 32 | 55.73 | —N/a | —N/a | 32 | 55.73 |

Results in the 2019–20 season
| Date | Event | SP | | FS | | Total | |
| Date | Event | P | Score | P | Score | P | Score |
|---|---|---|---|---|---|---|---|
| Oct 11–13, 2019 | (Finland) 2019 CS Finlandia Trophy | 15 | 58.13 | 17 | 97.30 | 17 | 155.43 |
| Oct 24–27, 2019 | (Croatia) 2019 Golden Bear of Zagreb | 2 | 64.74 | 4 | 118.90 | 4 | 183.64 |
| Nov 14–17, 2019 | (Poland) 2019 CS Warsaw Cup | 13 | 60.22 | 16 | 109.87 | 16 | 170.09 |
| Dec 4–7, 2019 | (Croatia) 2019 CS Golden Spin of Zagreb | 27 | 51.13 | 25 | 99.25 | 25 | 150.38 |
| Dec 13–15, 2019 | (Finland) 2020 Finnish Championships | 2 | 67.86 | 1 | 121.30 | 2 | 189.16 |
| Feb 3–9, 2020 | (Germany) 2020 Bavarian Open | 10 | 59.12 | 9 | 104.87 | 10 | 163.99 |
| Feb 20–23, 2020 | (Netherlands) 2020 International Challenge Cup | 14 | 57.71 | 13 | 112.20 | 14 | 169.91 |

Results in the 2020–21 season
| Date | Event | SP | | FS | | Total | |
| Date | Event | P | Score | P | Score | P | Score |
|---|---|---|---|---|---|---|---|
| Sep 23–26, 2020 | (Germany) 2020 CS Nebelhorn Trophy | 15 | 57.42 | 11 | 117.49 | 13 | 174.91 |
| Nov 26–29, 2020 | (Germany) 2020 NRW Autumn Trophy | 2 | 66.22 | 5 | 104.31 | 5 | 170.53 |
| Feb 18–21, 2021 | (Estonia) 2021 Tallink Hotels Cup | 6 | 61.41 | 5 | 110.99 | 5 | 172.40 |
| Mar 22–28, 2021 | (Sweden) 2021 World Championships | 31 | 60.27 | —N/a | —N/a | 31 | 60.27 |

Results in the 2021–22 season
| Date | Event | SP | | FS | | Total | |
| Date | Event | P | Score | P | Score | P | Score |
|---|---|---|---|---|---|---|---|
| Sep 21–25, 2021 | (Germany) 2021 CS Nebelhorn Trophy | 24 | 55.22 | 22 | 105.80 | 24 | 161.02 |
| Oct 7–10, 2021 | (Finland) 2021 CS Finlandia Trophy | 14 | 65.74 | 19 | 114.01 | 19 | 179.75 |
| Oct 27–31, 2021 | (Kazakhstan) 2021 CS Denis Ten Memorial Challenge | 9 | 64.39 | 11 | 113.08 | 11 | 177.47 |
| Nov 4–7, 2021 | (Germany) 2021 NRW Trophy | 4 | 61.31 | 4 | 116.62 | 4 | 177.93 |
| Nov 16–21, 2021 | (Estonia) 2021 Tallinn Trophy | 2 | 62.42 | 7 | 116.94 | 2 | 179.36 |
| Dec 17–19, 2021 | (Finland) 2022 Finnish Championships | 1 | 69.38 | 2 | 125.95 | 1 | 195.33 |
| Jan 10–16, 2022 | (Estonia) 2022 European Championships | 20 | 67.34 | 18 | 123.63 | 19 | 190.97 |
| Jan 18–23, 2022 | (Germany) 2022 Bavarian Open | 4 | 69.90 | 3 | 127.90 | 4 | 197.80 |
| Jan 27–30, 2022 | (Denmark) 2022 Nordic Championships | 1 | 69.07 | 1 | 121.56 | 1 | 190.63 |
| Feb 11–13, 2022 | (Hungary) 2022 Jégvirág Cup | 2 | 65.10 | 5 | 119.98 | 3 | 185.08 |
| Feb 24–27, 2022 | (Netherlands) 2022 International Challenge Cup | 8 | 66.93 | 11 | 120.67 | 10 | 187.60 |

Results in the 2022–23 season
| Date | Event | SP | | FS | | Total | |
| Date | Event | P | Score | P | Score | P | Score |
|---|---|---|---|---|---|---|---|
| Sep 21–24, 2022 | (Germany) 2022 CS Nebelhorn Trophy | 7 | 69.34 | 13 | 108.94 | 12 | 178.28 |
| Oct 5–9, 2022 | (Finland) 2022 CS Finlandia Trophy | 12 | 63.91 | 14 | 121.28 | 14 | 185.19 |
| Nov 3–4, 2022 | (Latvia) 47th Volvo Open Cup | 2 | 70.23 | 6 | 114.42 | 5 | 184.65 |
| Nov 17–20, 2022 | (Poland) 2022 CS Warsaw Cup | 13 | 67.94 | 11 | 130.54 | 13 | 198.48 |
| Nov 25–27, 2022 | (Finland) 2022 Grand Prix of Espoo | 9 | 69.15 | 8 | 134.87 | 9 | 204.02 |
| Nov 28 – Dec 4, 2022 | (Hungary) 2022 Santa Claus Cup | 5 | 63.46 | 3 | 127.71 | 4 | 191.17 |
| Dec 16–18, 2022 | (Finland) 2023 Finnish Championships | 1 | 68.69 | 1 | 133.50 | 1 | 202.19 |
| Jan 23–29, 2023 | (Finland) 2023 European Championships | 18 | 68.33 | 14 | 129.95 | 14 | 198.28 |
| Jan 31 – Feb 5, 2023 | (Germany) 2023 Bavarian Open | 1 | 71.27 | 1 | 132.10 | 1 | 203.37 |
| Feb 16–19, 2023 | (Estonia) 2023 Tallink Hotels Cup | 6 | 68.65 | 5 | 134.54 | 5 | 203.19 |
| Feb 23–26, 2023 | (Netherlands) 2023 International Challenge Cup | 11 | 69.91 | 10 | 126.85 | 10 | 196.76 |

Results in the 2023–24 season
| Date | Event | SP | | FS | | Total | |
| Date | Event | P | Score | P | Score | P | Score |
|---|---|---|---|---|---|---|---|
| Nov 2–5, 2023 | (Kazakhstan) 2023 CS Denis Ten Memorial Challenge | 9 | 65.74 | 8 | 135.09 | 8 | 200.83 |
| Nov 16–19, 2023 | (Poland) 2023 CS Warsaw Cup | 9 | 69.17 | 9 | 131.38 | 10 | 200.55 |
| Nov 21–24, 2023 | (Estonia) 2023 Tallinn Trophy | 4 | 60.85 | 4 | 119.68 | 4 | 180.53 |
| Dec 15–17, 2023 | (Finland) 2024 Finnish Championships | 2 | 70.03 | 1 | 130.80 | 2 | 200.83 |
| Jan 30 – Feb 4, 2024 | (Germany) 2024 Bavarian Open | 6 | 68.07 | 11 | 120.73 | 10 | 188.80 |
| Feb 15–18, 2024 | (Estonia) 2024 Tallink Hotels Cup | 4 | 70.78 | 4 | 138.20 | 3 | 208.98 |
| Mar 18–24, 2024 | (Canada) 2024 World Championships | 34 | 66.55 | —N/a | —N/a | 34 | 66.55 |

Results in the 2024–25 season
| Date | Event | SP | | FS | | Total | |
| Date | Event | P | Score | P | Score | P | Score |
|---|---|---|---|---|---|---|---|
| Oct 3–5, 2024 | (Kazakhstan) 2024 CS Denis Ten Memorial Challenge | 5 | 67.38 | 10 | 120.25 | 10 | 187.63 |
| Oct 31 – Nov 3, 2024 | (Latvia) 53rd Volvo Open Cup | 4 | 67.30 | 10 | 113.71 | 9 | 181.01 |
| Nov 15–17, 2024 | (Finland) 2024 Finlandia Trophy | 12 | 57.28 | 11 | 108.97 | 11 | 166.25 |
| Nov 20–24, 2024 | (Poland) 2024 CS Warsaw Cup | 11 | 62.37 | 9 | 123.16 | 11 | 185.53 |
| Dec 13–15, 2024 | (Finland) 2025 Finnish Championships | 1 | 62.75 | 1 | 127.94 | 1 | 190.69 |
| Jan 20–26, 2025 | (Germany) 2025 Bavarian Open | 7 | 64.82 | 5 | 124.11 | 5 | 188.93 |
| Jan 28 – Feb 2, 2025 | (Estonia) 2025 European Championships | 24 | 65.18 | 23 | 109.65 | 24 | 174.83 |
| Feb 6–9, 2025 | (United Arab Emirates) 2025 Union Figure Skating Trophy | 1 | 69.39 | 1 | 123.76 | 1 | 193.15 |
| Feb 13–16, 2025 | (Italy) 2025 Merano Ice Trophy | 1 | 73.94 | 2 | 138.96 | 2 | 212.90 |
| Feb 13–16, 2025 | (Estonia) 2025 Tallink Hotels Cup | 2 | 69.99 | 2 | 133.21 | 2 | 203.20 |
| Feb 18–23, 2025 | (Romania) 2025 Bellu Memorial | 4 | 64.26 | 5 | 119.10 | 4 | 183.36 |

Results in the 2025–26 season
| Date | Event | SP | | FS | | Total | |
| Date | Event | P | Score | P | Score | P | Score |
|---|---|---|---|---|---|---|---|
| Aug 21–22, 2025 | (United Kingdom) 2025 Robin Cousins Cup | 5 | 58.73 | 5 | 113.30 | 5 | 172.03 |
| Sep 18–21, 2025 | (China) 2025 ISU Skate to Milano | 32 | 56.95 | 19 | 106.24 | 21 | 163.19 |
| Nov 5–9, 2025 | (Latvia) 2025 Volvo Open Cup | 6 | 55.37 | 5 | 113.30 | 5 | 168.67 |
| Nov 21–23, 2025 | (Finland) 2025 Finlandia Trophy | 12 | 61.92 | 12 | 111.87 | 12 | 173.79 |
| Nov 25-30, 2025 | (Estonia) 2025 CS Tallinn Trophy | 19 | 58.65 | 14 | 120.71 | 17 | 179.36 |
| Dec 3–6, 2025 | (Croatia) 2025 CS Golden Spin of Zagreb | 19 | 60.28 | 19 | 111.17 | 20 | 171.45 |
| Dec 12-14, 2025 | (Finland) 2026 Finnish Championships | 1 | 66.37 | 3 | 120.32 | 3 | 186.69 |
| Jan 22-25, 2026 | (Latvia) 2026 Volvo Open Cup | 2 | 67.58 | 2 | 139.28 | 2 | 206.86 |

Results in the 2026–27 season
| Date | Event | SP | | FS | | Total | |
| Date | Event | P | Score | P | Score | P | Score |
|---|---|---|---|---|---|---|---|
| Sep 11–13, 2026 | (Estonia) 2026 Tallinn Open | 4 | 69.74 | 4 | 120.35 | 4 | 190.09 |
| Oct 1–4, 2026 | (Georgia (country)) 2026 CS Trialeti Trophy | 9 | 61.26 | 11 | 93.94 | 11 | 155.20 |
| Oct 29 – Nov 1, 2026 | (Iceland) 2026 Northern Lights Trophy | 2 | 59.79 | 2 | 106.87 | 2 | 166.66 |
| Nov 4–8, 2026 | (Latvia) 2026 Volvo Open Cup | 6 | 67.30 | 6 | 118.03 | 6 | 185.33 |

=== Junior level ===
Results in the 2002–03 season
| Date | Event | SP | | FS | | Total | |
| Date | Event | P | Score | P | Score | P | Score |
|---|---|---|---|---|---|---|---|
| Jan 10–12, 2003 | (Finland) 2003 Finnish Championships (Junior) | – | – | – | – | 2 | – |

Results in the 2003–04 season
| Date | Event | SP | | FS | | Total | |
| Date | Event | P | Score | P | Score | P | Score |
|---|---|---|---|---|---|---|---|
| Jan 3–4, 2004 | (Finland) 2004 Finnish Championships (Junior) | – | – | – | – | 2 | – |
| Feb 13–15, 2004 | (Sweden) 2004 Nordic Championships (Junior) | 1 | – | 3 | – | 3 | 3.5 |
| Feb 29 – Mar 7, 2004 | (Netherlands) 2004 World Junior Championships | 29 | – | – (13) | – | 30 | – |

Results in the 2004–05 season
| Date | Event | SP | | FS | | Total | |
| Date | Event | P | Score | P | Score | P | Score |
|---|---|---|---|---|---|---|---|
| Sep 1–5, 2004 | 2004 JGP Hungary | 18 | 38.54 | 14 | 77.14 | 14 | 115.68 |
| Oct 7–9, 2004 | 2004 JGP Germany | 17 | 38.50 | 14 | 75.30 | 14 | 113.80 |
| Dec 18–19, 2004 | (Finland) 2005 Finnish Championships (Junior) | 1 | – | 1 | – | 1 | – |
| Feb 28 – Mar 6, 2005 | (Canada) 2005 World Junior Championships | 20 | 44.59 | 18 (10) | 84.49 (78.22) | 20 | 148.64 |

Results in the 2005–06 season
| Date | Event | SP | | FS | | Total | |
| Date | Event | P | Score | P | Score | P | Score |
|---|---|---|---|---|---|---|---|
| Sep 29 – Oct 2, 2005 | 2005 JGP Bulgaria | 17 | 35.48 | 13 | 72.22 | 15 | 107.70 |
| Oct 12–15, 2005 | 2005 JGP Poland | 17 | 39.81 | 16 | 77.71 | 16 | 117.52 |
| Feb 9–12, 2006 | (Denmark) 2006 Nordic Championships (Junior) | 1 | 47.20 | 2 | 78.90 | 2 | 126.10 |
| Mar 6–12, 2006 | (Slovenia) 2006 World Junior Championships | 29 | 36.77 | – (12) | – (92.36) | 27 | – |
