= Samantha Cesario =

American figure skater (born 1993)

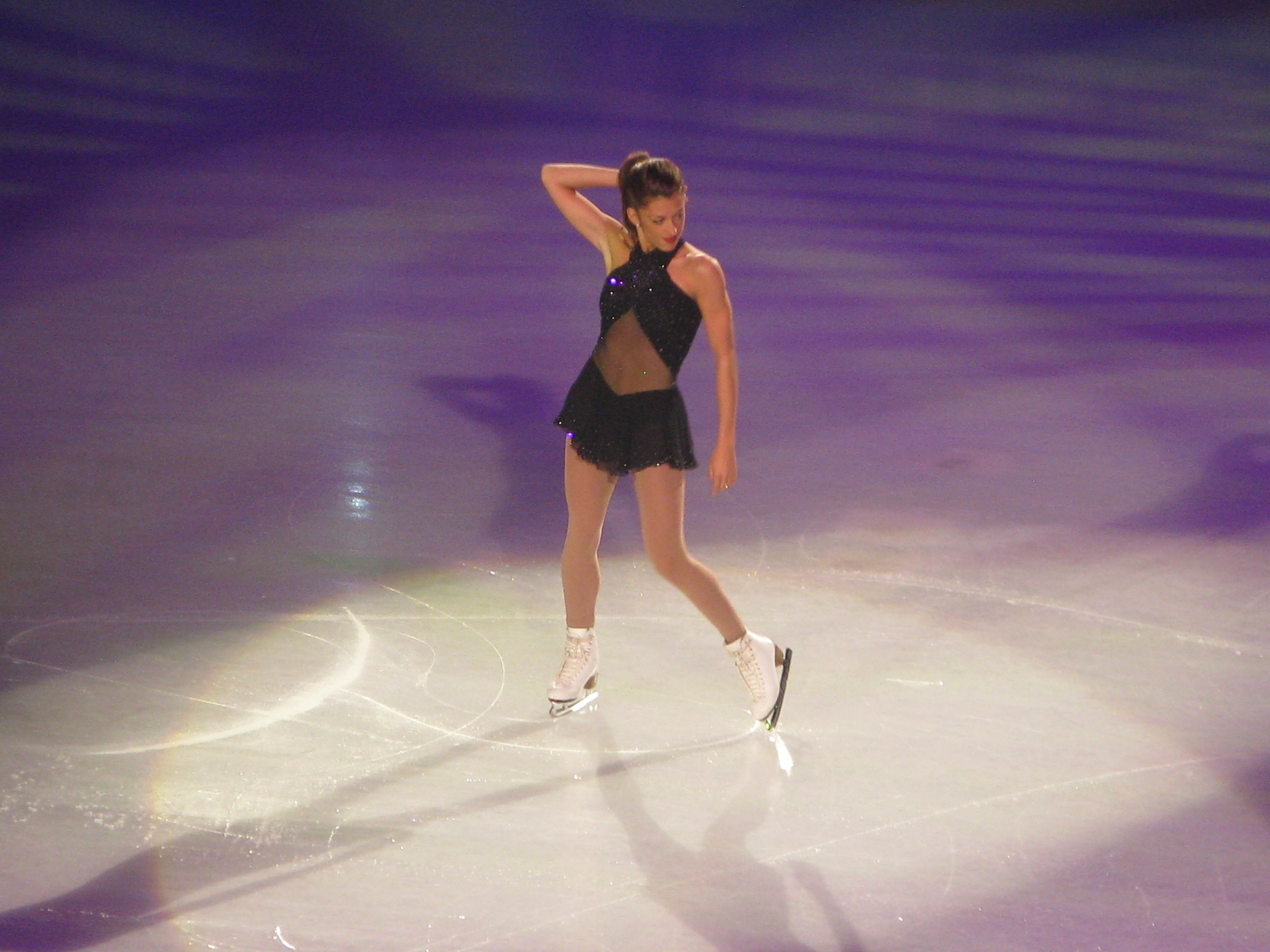
- Cesario at Bompard 2013

Personal information
- Born: August 21, 1993 (age 33) Rockville Centre, New York, U.S.
- Home town: Oceanside, New York, U.S.
- Height: 5 ft 3 in (1.60 m)

Figure skating career
- Country: United States
- Skating club: SC of New York
- Began skating: 1999
- Retired: May 11, 2015

Samantha Cesario (born August 21, 1993) is an American former competitive figure skater. She won three bronze medals on the ISU Junior Grand Prix series and placed 4th at the 2013 World Junior Championships. On the senior level, she won bronze at the 2013 U.S. Classic and silver at the 2014 Finlandia Trophy.

== Personal life ==
Samantha Cesario was born on August 21, 1993, in Rockville Centre, New York. Her mother, Joanne, is an elementary school monitor. She grew up in Oceanside, New York, and graduated from Oceanside High School in 2011. Deciding to focus on skating, she turned down a scholarship to the Fashion Institute of Technology.

In June 2019, Cesario married her partner of 9 years, Jesse Kramer. In August 2021, Cesario and Kramer announced they were expecting their first child. On December 18, 2021, Cesario gave birth to a daughter named Whitney Jane.

== Career ==
Cesario began skating when she was six years old. She was coached by Mary Lynn Gelderman from the age of eight until the end of her career.

Cesario made her international debut in 2010 when she won the 2010 Gardena Spring Trophy on the junior level. The following season, she made her ISU Junior Grand Prix debut, competing at the JGP in Romania where she placed 4th. After winning 2011 Eastern Sectionals she withdrew from the 2011 U.S. Championships due to a back injury. She spent eight weeks in a hard cast. She was later diagnosed with an arthritic facet joint and was administered a cortisone shot to be able to train full run-throughs.

Cesario made her comeback in the 2011–12 season. She competed at the Junior Grand Prix event in Poland where she took bronze. She placed third also at her other Junior Grand Prix event in Estonia. In January 2012, she tore her left lateral collateral ligament, resulting in her withdrawing from the 2012 U.S. Championships and keeping her off the ice for six to eight weeks.

In the 2012–13 season, Cesario competed at the Junior Grand Prix in Austria where she earned the bronze medal. She went to the Junior Grand Prix in Germany, but was injured and withdrew after the short program. At the 2013 U.S. Championships, she placed 8th and earned a spot on the Junior World Team. Cesario placed fourth at Junior Worlds after placing 1st in the short program and 4th in the free skate. Due to misaligned knees, she attempted 3Lo–3Lo combinations more commonly than 3T–3T (jumps) in order to reduce pressure on her facet joint.

In 2013–14, Cesario won bronze in her first event of the season, the U.S. International Classic. She placed fifth and fourth at her two senior Grand Prix assignments, the 2013 Skate America and 2013 Trophée Éric Bompard. She had mononucleosis in May and June 2014.

During the 2014–15, Cesario won silver at 2014 Finlandia Trophy. She then finished fourth and seventh at her two senior Grand Prix assignments, the 2014 Skate America and 2014 Trophée Éric Bompard. She went on to place fifth at the 2015 U.S. Championships before ending her season at 2015 Four Continents Championships, where she finished eighth. On May 11, 2015, Cesario announced her retirement from competitive figure skating due to recurring injuries and disagreements with the judging system. She intended to become a coach.

== Programs ==
Season	Short program	Free skating
2014–15	Danza Mora by Dr. Samy Farag	Carmen Suite by Georges Bizet, Rodion Shchedrin
2013–14	Fever	Carmen Suite by Georges Bizet, Rodion Shchedrin
2011–13	Carmen Fantasie by David Garrett	Black Swan by Clint Mansell
2010–11	Carmen Fantasie by David Garrett	Man of La Mancha including The Impossible Dream by Mitch Leigh performed by the Boston Pops
2009–10	Nocturne from Bohemian Rhapsody by Queen	Dark Eyes by Lionel Hampton
2008–09	Tango de los Exilados by Vanessa-Mae	Tosca by Giacomo Puccini

== Competitive highlights ==
GP: Grand Prix; CS: Challenger Series; JGP: Junior Grand Prix

International
Event	08–09	09–10	10–11	11–12	12–13	13–14	14–15
Four Continents						8th	8th
GP Bompard						4th	7th
GP Skate America						5th	4th
CS Finlandia							2nd
U.S. Classic						3rd	
International: Junior
Junior Worlds					4th		
JGP Austria					3rd		
JGP Estonia				3rd			
JGP Germany					WD		
JGP Poland				3rd			
JGP Romania			4th				
Gardena		1st J					
National
U.S. Championships	6th J	14th	WD	WD	8th	5th	5th
