= 14 (album) =

Studio album by David Garrett
- Released: April 2, 2013
- Genre: Classical

David Garrett chronology
Music (2012)	14 (2013)	Garrett vs. Paganini (2013)

14 is a studio album by German violinist David Garrett. It was released on April 2, 2013, by Deutsche Grammophon GmbH in Berlin. 14 is under exclusive license to Deutsche Grammophon & Decca Classics, U.S., a division of UMG Recordings, Inc.

== Track listing ==
1. "La campanella" (by Paganini)
2. "Larghetto" (from Sonata for Violin and Continuo in G by Tartini)
3. "Allegro energico" (from Sonata for Violin and Continuo in G by Tartini)
4. "Grave" (from Sonata for Violin and Continuo in G by Tartini)
5. "Allegro assai" (from Sonata for Violin and Continuuo in G by Tartini
6. "Humoresque op.101 no.7" (by Dvorak, arranged for Violin and Piano)
7. "Ave Maria" (by Schubert, adapted for Violin and Piano)
8. "Praeludium and Allegro in the style of Gaetano Pugnani" (by Kreisler)
9. "None But The Lonely Heart, op.6, No.6" (by Tchaikovsky)
10. "Fantaisie Brillante op.20" (by Wieniaski)
11. "Liebesleid" (by Kreisler)
12. "La Carpricieuse op.17" (by Elgar)
13. "Kol Nidrei op. 47"
14. "IV.Giga"
