= Virtuoso (David Garrett album) =

Studio album by David Garrett
- Released: Nov 16, 2007
- Genre: Classical
- Label: Deag

David Garrett chronology
Free (2007)	Virtuoso (2007)	Encore (2008)

Virtuoso is a 2007 album by violinist David Garrett, released in Europe. Its tracks, listed below, are mostly borrowed from his earlier album, Free:

== Track listing ==
1. "La Califfa" (Ennio Morricone) – 2:46
2. "Carmen Fantasie" (Georges Bizet) featuring Paco Peña, guitar – 4:15
3. "Nothing Else Matters" (Metallica) – 3:32
4. "Csardas Gypsy Dance" (Vittorio Monti) – 3:27
5. "Duelling Banjos" (from the film Deliverance) – 2:11
6. "Pachelbel's Canon" – 3:16
7. "Paganini Rhapsody" (on Caprice 24) – 4:08
8. "Somewhere" (from Leonard Bernstein's musical West Side Story) – 3:01
9. "The Flight of the Bumble Bee" (Nikolai Rimsky-Korsakov) – 1:20
10. "Serenade" (David Garrett, Franck van der Heijden) – 3:38
11. "Toccata" (David Garrett, Franck van der Heijden) – 3:50
12. "You Raise Me Up" (Brendan Graham, Rolf Løvland) – 4:15
13. "Eliza's Song" (David Garrett, Franck van der Heijden) – 2:59

== Personnel ==
- Jennifer Allan – production coordination
- Kevin Bacon – bass, percussion, arranger, producer, mixing
- Rick Blaskey – executive producer, representation
- Ed Boyd – guitar
- Paul Chessell – art direction
- Tom Coyne – mastering
- Thomas Dyani – percussion
- Ali Friend – double bass
- David Garrett – violin, arranger, producer, liner notes
- Tim Goalen – assistant producer
- Robert Groslot – conductor
- Ian Harrison – cover photo
- Mitch Jenkins – photography
- Robbie McIntosh – guitar
- Mark Millington – design
- Paco Peña – flamenco guitar
- Jonathan Quarmby – guitar, piano, arranger, organ (hammond), whistle, producer, mixing
- Samantha Rowe – cello
- Darren Rumney – design
- Rob Sannen – assistant engineer
- Jacky Schroer – A&R
- Mark Sheridan – guitar, background vocals, flamenco guitar
- Lloyd Wade – background vocals
- Ian Watson – accordion
- Tim Weller – drums
- Damon "Day" Wilson – drums

== Certifications ==
Country	Certifications (sales thresholds)
Germany	Platinum
