= Free (David Garrett album) =

Studio album by David Garrett
- Released: May 23, 2007
- Genre: Classical
- Length: 32:48
- Label: Decca

David Garrett chronology
Pure Classics (2002)	Free (2007)	Virtuoso (2009)

Free is a 2007 album by violinist David Garrett, released in Europe by Decca.

== Track listing ==
1. "La Califfa" (Ennio Morricone)
2. "Carmen Fantasie" (Georges Bizet) featuring Paco Peña, guitar
3. "Nothing Else Matters" (Metallica)
4. "Csardas Gypsy Dance" (Vittorio Monti)
5. "Duelling Strings" (from the film Deliverance)
6. "Paganini Rhapsody" (on Caprice 24)
7. "Serenade" (David Garrett, Franck van der Heijden)
8. "Flight of the Bumble Bee" (Nikolai Rimsky-Korsakov)
9. "Toccata" (David Garrett, Franck van der Heijden)
10. "Somewhere" (from Leonard Bernstein's musical West Side Story)
11. "Eliza's Song" (David Garrett, Franck van der Heijden)
