= Pure Classics =

Greatest hits album by David Garrett
- Released: 2002
- Genre: Classical

David Garrett chronology
| Tchaikovsky, Conus: Violin Concertos (1997) | Pure Classics (2002) | Free (2007) |

Pure Classics is a 2002 album by violinist David Garrett, published in Germany by Deutsche Grammophon and later made available in the US as David's international popularity grew. It is a kind of "best of" collection that combines many of his previous classical violin recordings into a single album. The following composers are represented:

- Wolfgang Amadeus Mozart
- Johann Sebastian Bach
- Ludwig van Beethoven
- Niccolò Paganini
- Julius Conus
- Pyotr Ilyich Tchaikovsky
