= Encore (David Garrett album) =

Studio album by David Garrett
- Released: October 2008
- Studio: Electric Lady Studios, NY; Livingston Recording Studios; Studio 1, Bulgarian National Radio
- Genre: Classical
- Length: 47:58
- Label: Warner
- Producer: Rick Blaskey

David Garrett chronology
Virtuoso (2007)	Encore (2008)	David Garrett (2009)

Encore is a 2008 album by violinist David Garrett, released in Europe.

== Track listing ==
1. "Smooth Criminal" (Michael Jackson)
2. "Who Wants to Live Forever?" (Queen)
3. "Clair de Lune" (Claude Debussy)
4. "He's a Pirate" (Pirates of the Caribbean theme)
5. "Summertime" (George Gershwin)
6. "Hungarian Dance No. 5" (Johannes Brahms)
7. "Chelsea Girl" (David Garrett and Franck van der Heijden)
8. "Summer" (Antonio Vivaldi)
9. "O Mio Babbino Caro" (Giacomo Puccini)
10. "Air" (J.S. Bach)
11. "Thunderstruck" (AC/DC)
12. "New Day" (David Garrett and Franck van der Heijden)
13. "Ain't No Sunshine" (Bill Withers)
14. "Rock Prelude" (David Garrett and Franck van der Heijden)
15. "Winter Lullaby" (David Garrett and Franck van der Heijden)
16. "Zorba's Dance" (from the film Zorba the Greek)

== Charts ==
=== Weekly charts ===
Chart (2008–2010)	Peak position
Austrian Albums (Ö3 Austria)	9
German Albums (Offizielle Top 100)	7
Swiss Albums (Schweizer Hitparade)	31

=== Year-end charts ===
Chart (2008)	Position
German Albums (Offizielle Top 100)	82
Chart (2009)	Position
German Albums (Offizielle Top 100)	31
Chart (2010)	Position
Austrian Albums (Ö3 Austria)	24
German Albums (Offizielle Top 100)	17

== Certifications ==
Region	Certification	Certified units/sales
Austria (IFPI Austria)	Platinum	20,000^{*}
Germany (BVMI)	5× Gold	500,000^{^}
^{*} Sales figures based on certification alone.^{^} Shipments figures based on certification alone.
