= Rock Symphonies =

2010 album by David Garrett

Studio album by David Garrett
- Released: 24 September 2010
- Length: 58:00
- Label: Decca

David Garrett chronology
Classic Romance (2009)	Rock Symphonies (2010)	Legacy (2011)

Rock Symphonies is an album by German violinist David Garrett, released in 2010 by Decca Records. The album was certified double platinum in Germany, reaching number one there and charting for 72 weeks. It also reached number three in Austria and number four in Switzerland.

== Track listing ==
1. "Smells Like Teen Spirit" (Nirvana cover) 4:06
2. "November Rain" (Guns N' Roses cover) – 3:59
3. "The 5th" (Ludwig van Beethoven) – 3:33
4. "Walk This Way" featuring Orianthi (Aerosmith cover) – 2:57
5. "Live and Let Die (Paul McCartney and Wings cover) – 3:25
6. "Vivaldi vs. Vertigo" (Antonio Vivaldi; U2 cover) – 3:15
7. "Master of Puppets" (Metallica cover) – 3:47
8. "80's Anthem" – 3:33
9. "Toccata" (Johann Sebastian Bach) – 3:52
10. "Asturias" (Isaac Albéniz) – 2:57
11. "Kashmir" (Led Zeppelin cover) – 3:36
12. "Rock Symphony" – 4:31
13. "Peer Gynt" (Edvard Grieg) – 2:33
14. "Mission Impossible" (Lalo Schifrin) – 3:16
15. "Rocking All Over the World" (Status Quo cover) – 3:43

=== Deluxe edition bonus tracks ===
16. "En Aranjuez Con Tu Amor" (Joaquín Rodrigo)
17. "I'll Stand by You" (The Pretenders cover)
18. "Mahler #5" (Gustav Mahler)
19. "Child's Anthem" (Toto cover)

Bonus video content

1. Rock Symphonies Trailer Part 1: Music
2. Rock Symphonies Trailer Part 2: The Concert
3. "Smells Like Teen Spirit" live from Electric Lady Studios
4. "Walk This Way" live from Electric Lady Studios

== DVD ==
1. "Kashmir" (Led Zeppelin cover)
2. "Serenade" (Franz Schubert)
3. "Smells Like Teen Spirit" (Nirvana cover)
4. "Mission Impossible" (Lalo Schifrin)
5. "Walk This Way" featuring Orianthi (Aerosmith cover)
6. "Smooth Criminal" (Michael Jackson cover)
7. "I'll Stand by You" (The Pretenders cover)
8. "Peer Gynt" (Edvard Grieg)
9. "Asturias" (Isaac Albeniz)
10. "Child's Anthem" (Toto cover)
11. "Zorba's Dance" (Mikīs Theodōrakīs)
12. "Hey Jude" (Beatles cover)

== Personnel ==
- David Garrett – violin
- Marcus Wolf – guitar on 2, 8, 10–14
- Franck Van Der Heijden – guitar (except on 4, 8, 12, 13)
- Orianthi – guitar on 4
- John Haywood – piano on 2, 8, 9, 12, 15
- Jeff Allen – bass
- Jeff Lipstein – drums
- Prague City Philharmonic Orchestra
- Arrangements: David Garrett

== Charts ==
Weekly chart performance for Rock Symphonies
Chart (2010–2015)	Peak position
Austrian Albums (Ö3 Austria)	3
Belgian Albums (Ultratop Wallonia)	49
Finnish Albums (Suomen virallinen lista)	23
French Albums (SNEP)	42
German Albums (Offizielle Top 100)	1
Italian Albums (FIMI)	49
Swedish Albums (Sverigetopplistan)	11
Swiss Albums (Schweizer Hitparade)	4
UK Albums (OCC)	21
US Billboard 200	41
