= Pilar Maekawa Moreno =

Mexican former competitive ice dancer (born 1994)

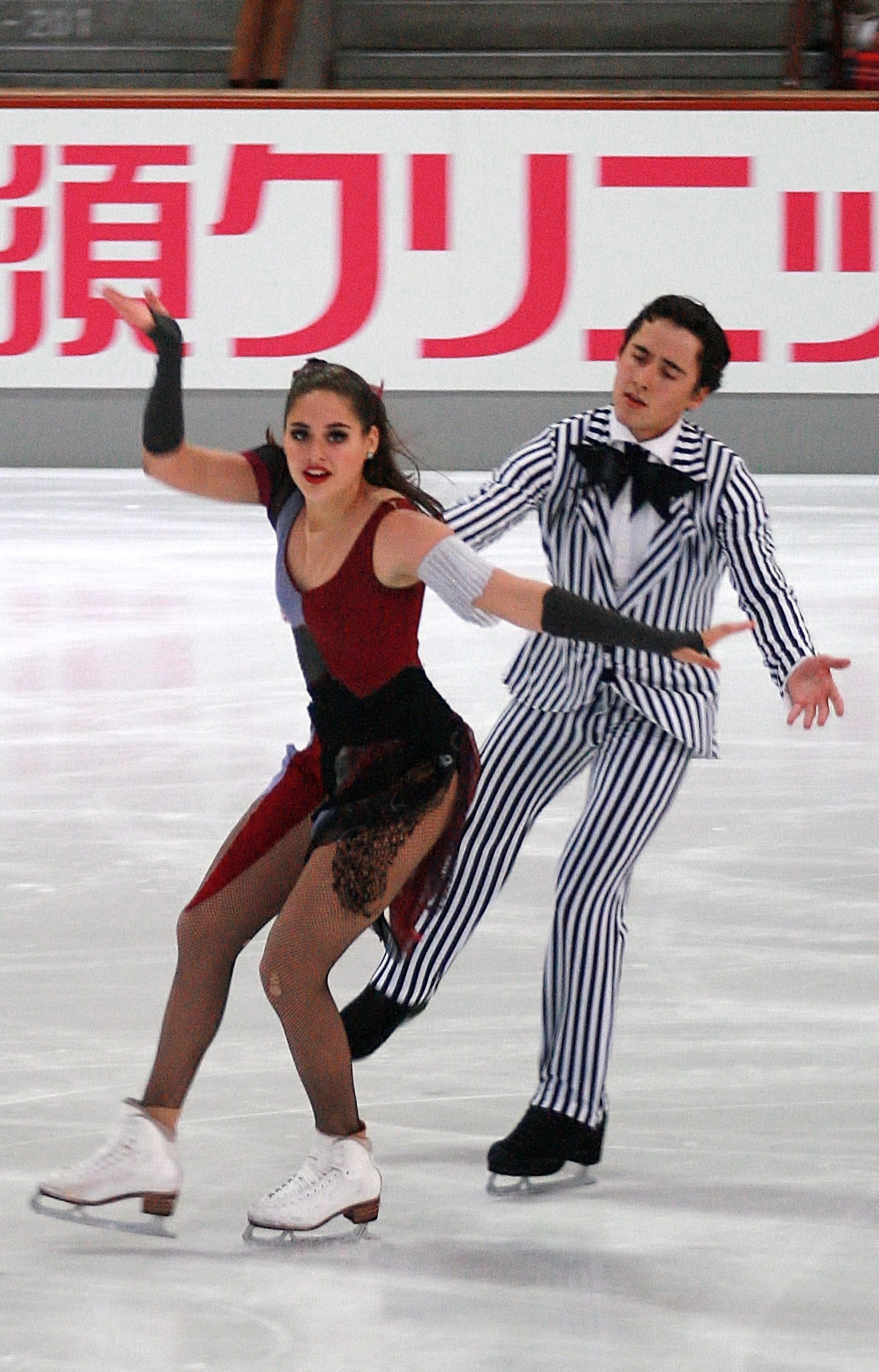
- Maekawa Moreno at the 2013 Nebelhorn Trophy

Personal information
- Born: August 23, 1994 (age 32) Mexico City, Mexico
- Height: 1.65 m (5 ft 5 in)

Figure skating career
- Country: Mexico
- Partner: Leonardo Maekawa Moreno
- Coach: Marina Zueva, Matt Willis, Oleg Epstein
- Skating club: Asociacion Estado de Mexico
- Began skating: 1997
- Retired: 2015

Pilar Maekawa Moreno (born August 23, 1994) is a Mexican former competitive ice dancer. With her brother, Leonardo Maekawa Moreno, she competed at three Four Continents Championships from 2013 to 2015. The two were coached by Marina Zueva, Matt Willis, and Oleg Epstein.

== Programs ==
(with Leonardo Maekawa Moreno)

Season	Short dance	Free dance
2014–2015	Flamenco mix by Gerudo Valley; Paso doble: Ameksa by Taalbi Brothers	Life Is Beautiful by Nicola Piovani
2013–2014	Charleston: Booty Swing by Parov Stelar; Swing: Puttin' On the Ritz performed by Club des Belugas; Quickstep: Mr. Pinstripe Suit by Big Bad Voodoo Daddy	The Nightmare Before Christmas by Danny Elfman
2012–2013	The Sound of Music: Polka: My Favorite Things by Richard Rodgers; Waltz: The Lonely Goatherd; Polka: My Favorite Things by Richard Rodgers	Ein Wiener Waltzer; Corrente by Karl Jenkins
2011–2012	Rhumba: Whatever Happens; Cha Cha: Don't Stop 'Til You Get Enough by Michael Jackson	Ein Wiener Waltzer; Corrente by Karl Jenkins

== Competitive highlights ==
CS: Challenger Series; JGP: Junior Grand Prix

With Leonardo Maekawa Moreno

International
Event	2011–12	2012–13	2013–14	2014–15
Four Continents		13th	13th	11th
CS Autumn Classic				13th
CS Finlandia Trophy				9th
CS U.S. Classic				5th
Golden Spin		18th		
Nebelhorn Trophy			21st	
U.S. Classic			14th	
International
JGP Austria	15th			
