= David Garrett (album) =

Compilation album by David Garrett
- Released: 2009
- Genre: Classical, various others
- Label: Decca

David Garrett chronology
Encore (2008)	David Garrett (2009)

Professional ratings
Review scores
Source	Rating
Allmusic	2.5/5 stars

David Garrett is a 2009 self-titled album by violinist David Garrett, released by Decca in the United States. It borrows all of its tracks from his earlier albums published in Europe, particularly Encore:

== Track listing ==
1. "Summer" (Antonio Vivaldi)
2. "Nothing Else Matters" (Metallica)
3. "He's a Pirate" (Pirates of the Caribbean theme)
4. "Smooth Criminal" (Michael Jackson)
5. "Csardas - Gypsy Dance" (Vittorio Monti)
6. "Who Wants to Live Forever?" (Queen)
7. "Thunderstruck" (AC/DC)
8. "Ain't No Sunshine" (Bill Withers)
9. "Carmen Fantaisie" (Georges Bizet) featuring Paco Peña, guitar
10. "Air" (J.S. Bach)
11. "Zorba's Dance" (from the film Zorba the Greek)
12. "Chelsea Girl" (David Garrett and Franck van der Heijden)
13. "Rock Prelude" (David Garrett and Franck van der Heijden)
14. "Dueling Banjos (Dueling Strings)" (from the film Deliverance)(Bonus track)
