= David Garrett =

German violinist (born 1980)

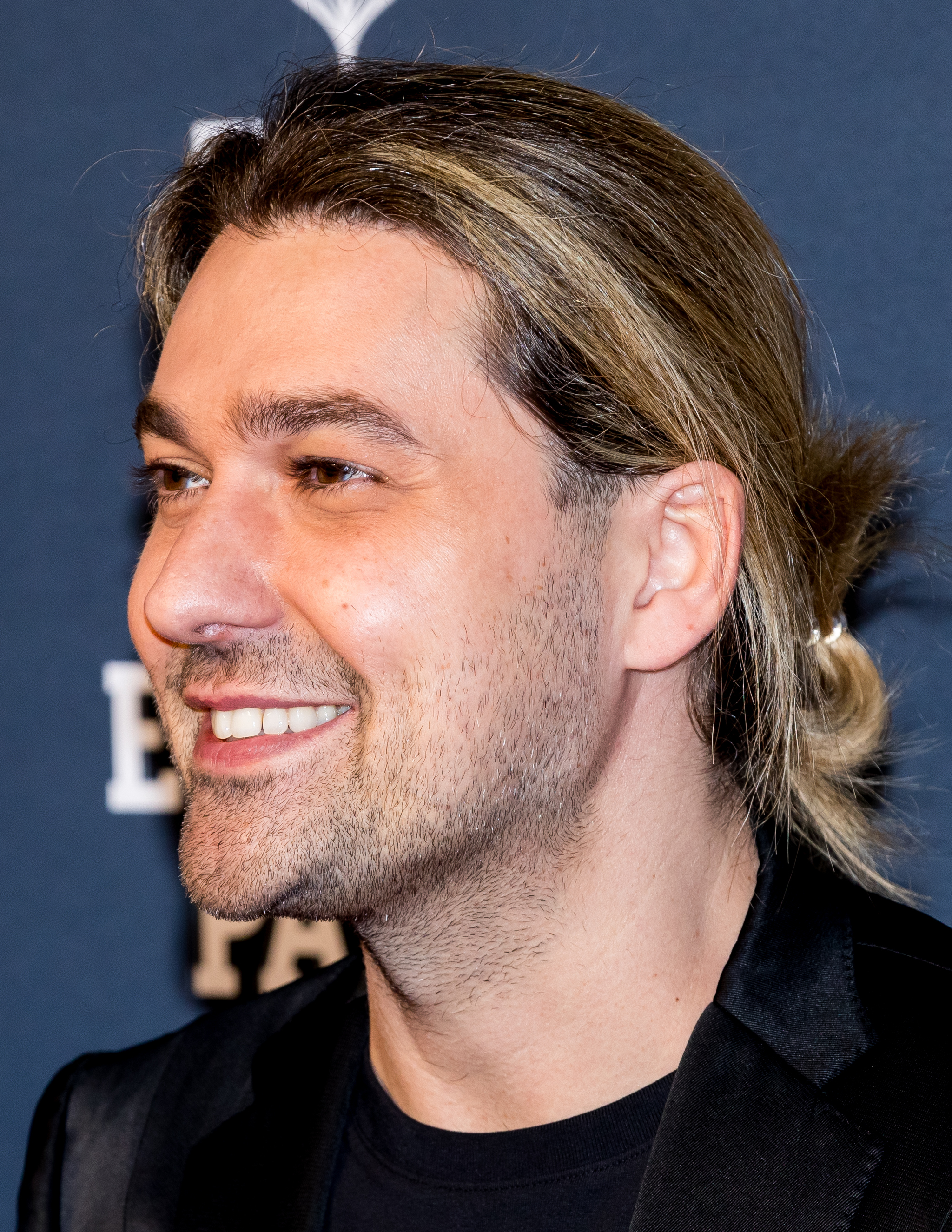
- Garrett in 2024

Background information
- Born: David Christian Bongartz; 4 September 1980 (age 46); Aachen, West Germany
- Genres: Classical, Crossover
- Instrument: Violin
- Years active: c. 1988–present
- Labels: Decca, Deutsche Grammophon
- Website: david-garrett.com

David Christian Bongartz (born 4 September 1980), known by his stage name David Garrett, is a German classical and crossover violinist and recording artist.

== Early life ==
When Garrett was four years old his father purchased a violin for his older brother. The young Garrett took an interest and soon learned to play. A year later, he took part in a competition and won first prize. By the age of seven, he studied violin at the Lübeck Conservatoire. When he was nine years old he gave his debut at the Festival Kissinger Sommer, and by the age of 12, Garrett began working with Polish violinist Ida Haendel, often traveling to London and other European cities to meet her. After leaving home at 17, he enrolled at the Royal College of Music in London, leaving after the first semester. On being asked in an interview in 2008 if he was expelled, Garrett responded: "Well, expelled wasn't the official term… It was mutually agreed that me [sic] and the RCM were going separate ways after the first semester. I did skip some lessons – but I also broke in to do extra practice, so that didn't help!" In 1999, he moved to New York to attend the Juilliard School, in 2003 winning the School's Composition Competition with a fugue composed in the style of Johann Sebastian Bach. While at Juilliard he studied under Itzhak Perlman, one of the first people to do so, and graduated in 2004.

Garrett attended the Keshet Eilon Masterclasses in Israel in the summers of 1997, 1998, 1999, and 2002.

== Career ==
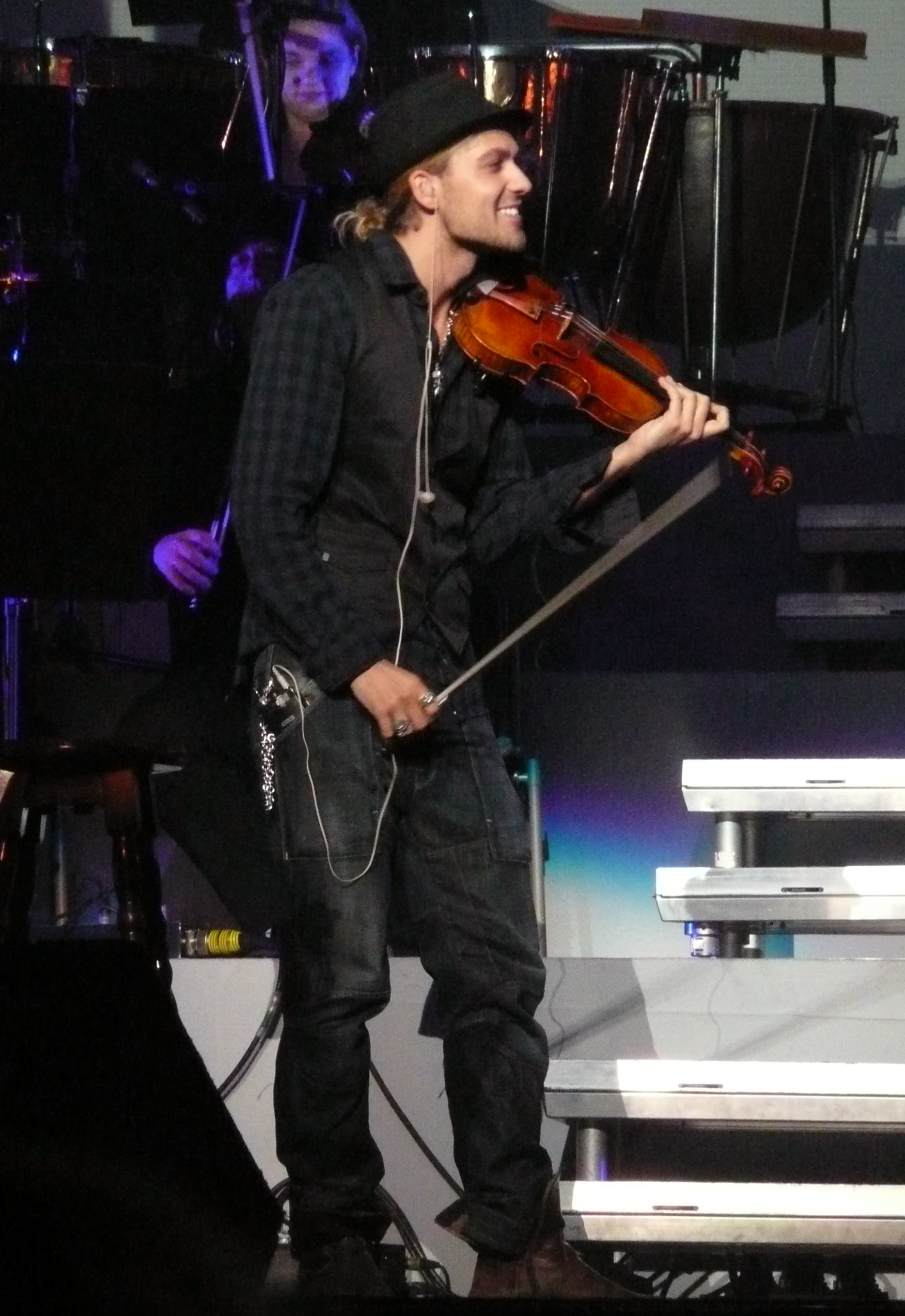
Garrett performing in Cologne in January 2010

Garrett received his first Stradivarius violin at the age of 11, courtesy of German president Richard von Weizsäcker, after having performed for him. At the age of 13, Garrett recorded two CDs, appeared on German and Dutch television, and gave a concert in the residence of the President of Germany, the Villa Hammerschmidt. At that age, he was offered the use of the "San Lorenzo" Stradivarius, which is among the best instruments of Antonio Stradivari's "golden period".

He eventually purchased his own violin, made in 1772 by Giovanni Guadagnini, a student of Stradivari. However, after a 2008 performance, he fell, landing on the violin which was strapped to his back and damaging it severely. Although he was able to get it repaired, he purchased a Stradivari soon afterward.

At the age of 13, as the youngest soloist ever, Garrett signed an exclusive contract with Deutsche Grammophon. In April 1997, aged 16, he played with the Munich Philharmonic Orchestra under the direction of Zubin Mehta in Delhi and Mumbai in concerts marking the 50th anniversary of India's Independence.

Two years later, Garrett played with the Berlin Radio Symphony Orchestra under the direction of Rafael Frühbeck de Burgos, and was hailed by critics. This led to an invitation to perform at Expo 2000 in Hanover. At the age of 21, he was invited to perform at the BBC Proms.

While studying at Juilliard, Garrett supplemented his income by working as a model.

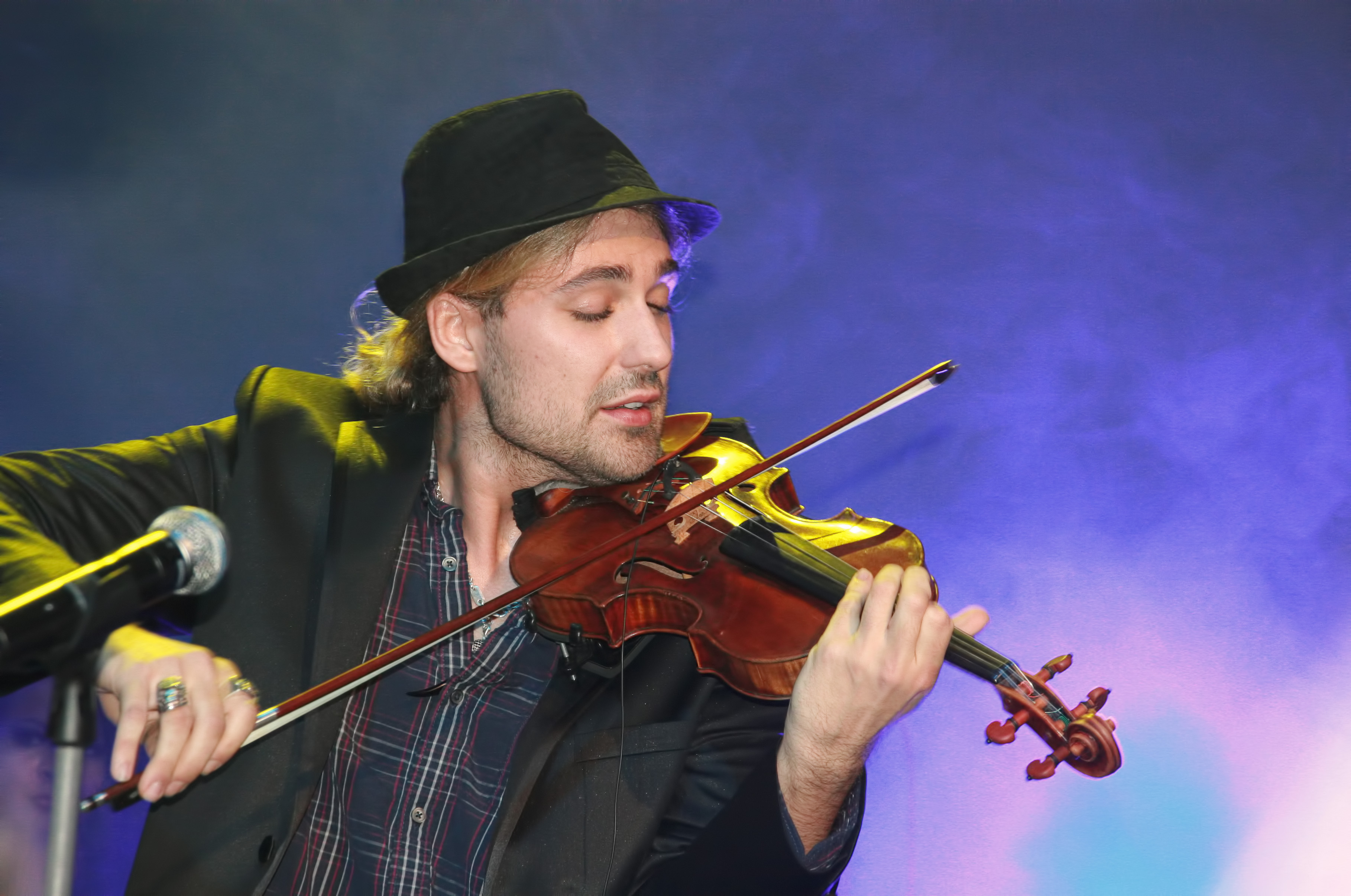
Garrett performing in February 2010

Garrett's 2008 album Encore pursues an aim of arousing young people's interest in classical music. The release contains his own compositions and arrangements of pieces and melodies that have accompanied him in his life so far. Together with his band, consisting of keyboard, guitar and drums, he gives concerts that include classical sonatas (accompanied by a concert grand piano), arrangements, and compositions, as well as rock songs and movie themes. In Autumn 2007, Garrett was chosen by the Montegrappa firm (whose items are distributed by Montblanc throughout the world) as an ambassador for the launch of the new pens from the Tributo ad Antonio Stradivari collection. The event took place in several venues, including in Rome, New York, Hong Kong, Berlin, and London. For these occasions Garrett was offered a Stradivarius from the Gli Archi di Palazzo Comunale collection. He also appeared at the Royal Variety Performance on 5 December 2011, playing his cover of Nirvana's "Smells Like Teen Spirit".

He joined the 9th annual Independent Music Awards judging panel to assist independent musicians' careers. His album, Music, was released in 2012. On 19 May 2012 he appeared at the UEFA Champions League Final performing with German singer Jonas Kaufmann. For 2014 he announced a new Crossover Tour.

He played the lead role in the 2013 film The Devil's Violinist, as the noted 19th-century violinist Niccolò Paganini. The same year he released his album Garrett vs Paganini. His 2015 album Explosive includes the original compositions Innovation, Furious, Explosive, Unlimited Symphony, Serenity, Baroque fantasy, and Melancholia.

On 18 August 2017, David Garrett released the single "Bittersweet Symphony" as a teaser for his album Rock Revolution, released 17 September 2017.

On 20 August 2020, Garrett performed the UEFA Europa League Anthem for the 2019-20 UEFA Europa League season, which took place in Germany from the Quarter Final stage. On 11 October 2020, Garrett performed the German national anthem at the Formula 1 2020 Eifel Grand Prix as part of the opening ceremonies. On 9 October he released another studio album called Alive: My Soundtrack.

== Personal life ==
Garrett was born in Aachen to an American prima ballerina, Dove Garrett, and a German jurist, Georg Bongartz. Garrett explains that while he was performing as a child prodigy, his parents started using his mother's maiden name as his stage name. "My parents kind of decided that it was more pronounceable than the German name, so I stuck with that."

== Recordings ==
=== Studio albums ===
- Mozart: Violin Concertos with Claudio Abbado (1995)
- Violin Sonata (1995)
- Paganini Caprices (1997)
- Tchaikovsky, Conus: Violin Concertos (1997)
- Pure Classics (2002)
- Free (2007)
- Virtuoso (2007)
- Encore (2008)
- David Garrett (2009)
- Classic Romance (2009)
- Rock Symphonies (2010)
- Legacy (2011)
- Music (2012)
- 14 (2013)
- Garrett vs. Paganini (2013)
- Caprice (2014)
- Timeless – Brahms & Bruch Violin Concertos with Zubin Mehta and Israel Philharmonic Orchestra (2014)
- Explosive (2015)
- Rock Revolution (2017)
- Unlimited – Greatest Hits (2018)
- Alive: My Soundtrack (2020)
- Iconic (2022)
- Millennium Symphony (2024)

=== Other albums ===
- Nokia Night of the Proms (2004)
- The New Classical Generation 2008 (2008)

=== Featured ===
- Tenor at the Movies – "Parla Più Piano" (theme from The Godfather) and "Se" (theme from Cinema Paradiso) with Jonathan Ansell (2008)
- A New World – "Cinema Paradiso" with Will Martin (2008)
- Barcelona – "How Can I Go On" with Freddie Mercury and Montserrat Caballé (2012)
- Classical 80s Dance – "Tainted Love" with Alex Christensen and the Berlin Orchestra (2022)

=== DVD ===
- David Garrett: Live – In Concert & In Private (2009)
- David Garrett: Rock Symphonies – Open Air Live (2010)
- David Garrett: Legacy Live in Baden Baden (2011)
- David Garrett: Music – Live in Concert (2012)
- David Garrett: Unlimited - Live from the Arena di Verona (2021)
- David Garrett: Alive - Live from Caracalla & The private life of a Star (2023)

== Filmography ==
- The Devil's Violinist
- Sesamstraße (1 episode)
- Dein Song (segment "Good Times")
- "Alle Tage ist kein Sonntag" (feat. Till Lindemann)

== Awards and recognition ==
- Radio Regenbogen Award, March 2008
- Echo Classics, Classic without borders, October 2008
- GQ Award Man of the Year category music, November 2008
- Goldene Feder, May 2009
- Goldener Geigenbogen, May 2009
- Golden Camera, Best Music International, January 2010
- World's Fastest Violinist, Guinness World Record, May 2008 to December 2011
- Bambi Awards, category Classic (14 November 2013)
- Frankfurter Musikpreis, 2017
