= Olga Mikutina =

Ukrainian-born figure skater (born 2003)

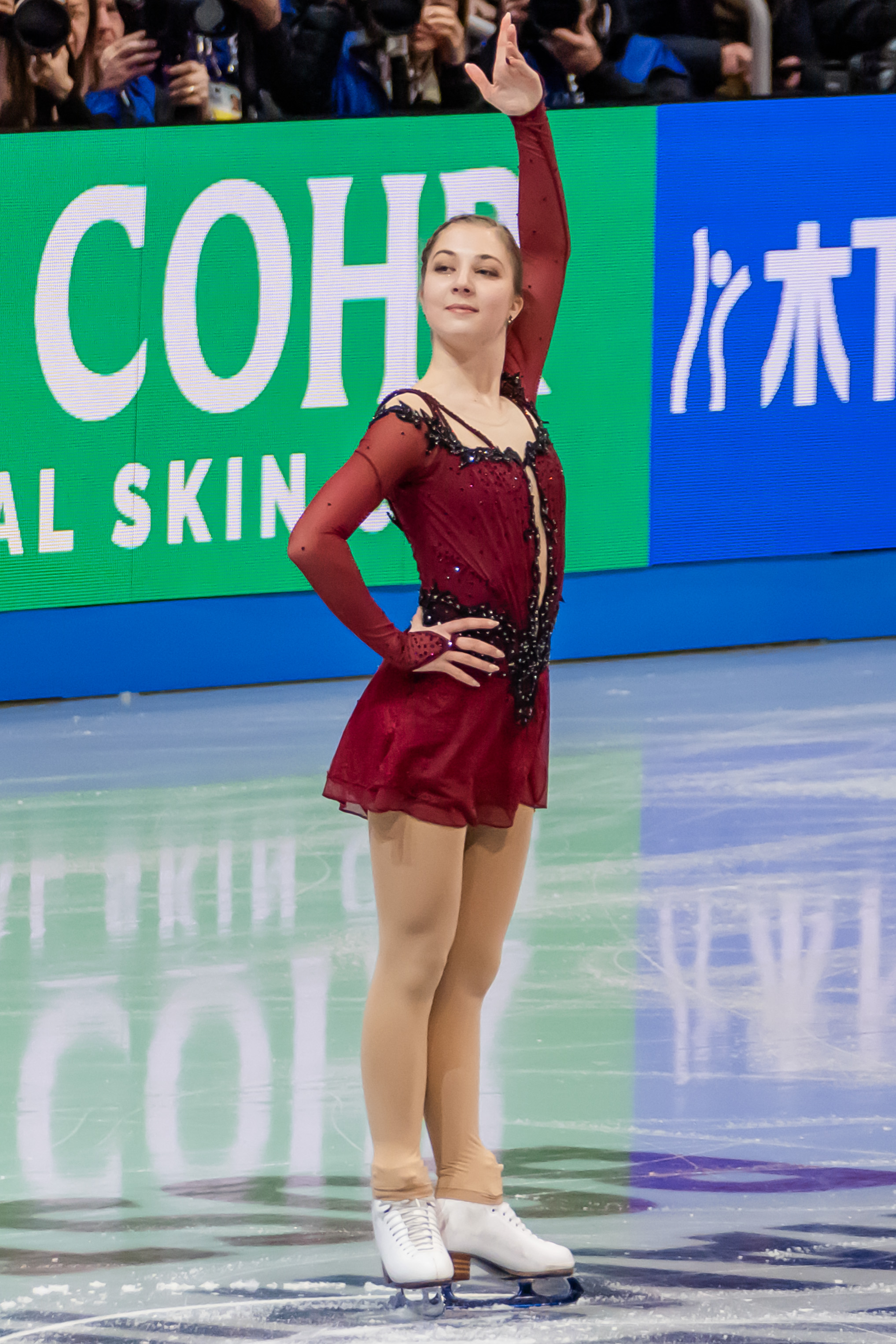
- Olga Mikutina at the 2025 World Championships

Personal information
- Native name: Ольга Романівна Мікутіна
- Full name: Olga Romanivna Mikutina
- Born: 6 October 2003 (age 23) Kharkiv, Ukraine
- Home town: Feldkirch, Austria
- Height: 1.63 m (5 ft 4 in)

Figure skating career
- Country: Austria (since 2016); Ukraine (until 2016)
- Discipline: Women's singles
- Coach: Elena Romanova; Rostislav Sinicyn; Roman Serov
- Skating club: FEV Feldkirch Einslaufverein Montfort
- Began skating: 2007
- Highest WS: 32nd (2021-22)

Medal record
Austrian Championships
Gold medal – first place	2020 Klagenfurt	Singles
Gold medal – first place	2021 Linz	Singles
Gold medal – first place	2024 Feldkirch	Singles
Gold medal – first place	2025 Dornbirn	Singles
Gold medal – first place	2026 Innsbruck	Singles
Silver medal – second place	2022 Graz	Singles

Olga Romanivna Mikutina (Ukrainian: Ольга Романівна Мікутіна; born 6 October 2003) is a Ukrainian-Austrian figure skater who competes for Austria. She is a five-time Austrian national champion (2020–21, 2024–26), as well as a two-time Austrian national junior champion (2019–2020). Internationally, she has represented the country at the European and World championships.

She has represented Austria at the 2022 and 2026 Winter Olympic Games.

== Personal life ==
Mikutina was born on 6 October 2003 in Kharkiv, Ukraine. Her father, Roman, is a hockey player. In fall 2023, Mikutina began attending Montclair State University in Montclair, New Jersey.

She speaks four languages including Russian, Ukrainian, German, and English.

== Career ==
=== Early career ===
Mikutina took up skating in 2007 at the age of four. She began her skating career competing for her native Ukraine and, by age twelve, was already a three-time Ukrainian youth national champion. During that time, her parents decided that she needed better training conditions than were available in Ukraine and were advised to seek out coach Elena Romanova in Feldkirch, Austria. She would later remark, "at first, I didn’t realize that we were really moving there. I thought we were just training there for some time." She began competing for Austria at the advanced novice level internationally in 2016. She subsequently became an Austrian citizen in January 2020.

=== 2017–2018 season: Junior debut ===
At the 2018 Austrian Championships, Mikutina won the junior bronze medal.

=== 2018–2019 season ===
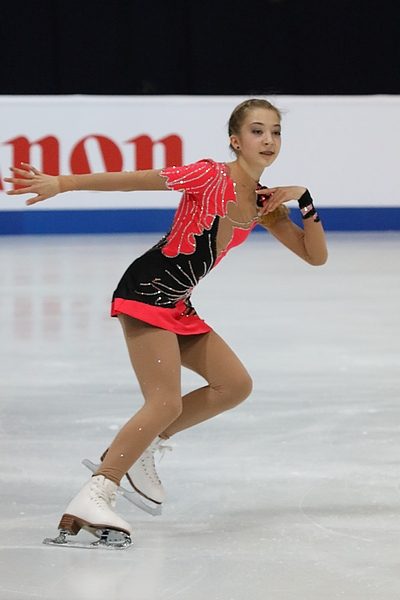
Mikutina at the 2019 Junior Worlds

Mikutina made her ISU Junior Grand Prix debut in August 2019 at the 2018 JGP Austria. She placed thirteenth overall at the event. Later in the season, she improved her JGP record by placing ninth overall at her second assignment, the 2018 JGP Czech Republic. After the Junior Grand Prix, Mikutina competed at several other international competitions, taking gold in the junior divisions of the 2018 installments of the Halloween Cup, Skate Celje, and the Volvo Open Cup.

At the 2019 Austrian Championships in December, Mikutina won her first junior national title and was thus named to the Austrian team for the 2019 World Junior Championships in Zagreb, Croatia. At the event in March, Mikutina ranked twentieth in the short program and qualified for the free skate, where she placed fifteenth, which lifted her to eighteenth overall.

=== 2019–2020 season: Senior international debut ===
Mikutina started the season at the 2019 JGP Latvia, where she placed seventeenth. Later that month, she placed thirteenth at 2019 JGP Zagreb. At her next event, Mikutina finished fourth at Ice Star 2019, held in Minsk. Afterward, she completed at several international competitions on the senior level, earning the silver medal at Golden Bear, bronze at the Tallinn Trophy, and gold medals at Icelab International Cup, Eiscup Innsbruck and Bosphorus Cup. In December, she won gold on the junior and senior levels at the Austrian championships, becoming the first skater to simultaneously hold Austrian national junior and senior titles.

In January, Mikutina came in fourth place at the EduSport Trophy in Bucharest and was assigned to the 2020 European Championships held in Graz, Austria. She ranked twenty-first in the short program at the event, earning a new personal best of 53.19 points. After the free skate, she finished in twenty-fourth place overall. Mikutina finished her season at the Jégvirág Cup in Hungary, where she won the gold medal at the junior level. She had been assigned to compete at the World Championships in Montreal, which would have been her senior Worlds debut, but those were cancelled as a result of the coronavirus pandemic.

=== 2020–2021 season ===
Mikutina made her season debut at the 2020 CS Nebelhorn Trophy, where she placed thirteenth. She was on the preliminary entry list for the 2020 CS Budapest Trophy but withdrew. After winning her second consecutive national title, she competed at the 2021 Tallink Hotels Cup, taking the silver medal behind Eva-Lotta Kiibus.

Mikutina made her World debut in Stockholm at the 2021 World Championships in late March. She skated clean in her short program at the event to score a new personal best, topping her previous score by over 14 points and qualified to the free skate in eleventh place. She then placed seventh in the free skate and finished eighth overall. Mikutina's placement in the top ten qualified a place for Austria at the 2022 Winter Olympics, as well as the possibility of a second berth and two placements at the following year's world championships. It was the best result for an Austrian lady since Julia Lautowa's eighth place in 1997.

=== 2021–2022 season: Beijing Olympics ===
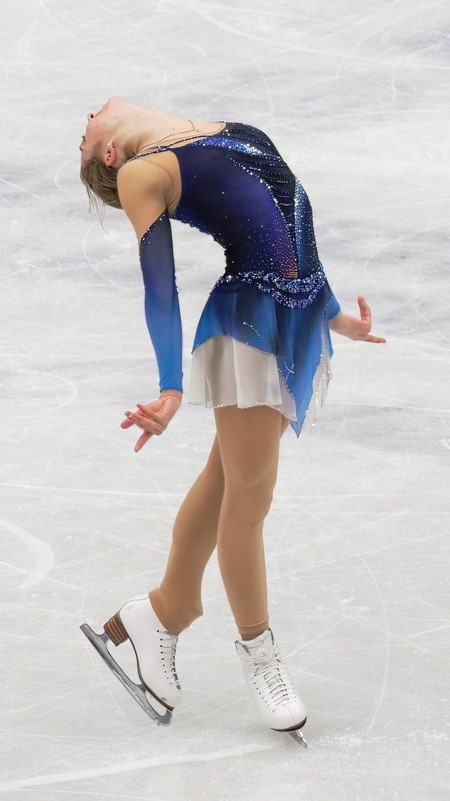
Mikutina at the 2022 World Championships

Suffering from right knee inflammation, Mikutina's training was hindered over the summer, and as a result, she withdrew from the 2021 CS Denis Ten Memorial Challenge and what was to be her first Grand Prix assignment, the 2021 NHK Trophy. She made her Grand Prix debut at the 2021 Rostelecom Cup, where she finished in twelfth place of twelve skaters.

Mikutina failed to defend her national title, taking the silver medal behind Stefanie Pesendorfer, but was still assigned to the Austrian Olympic team and the European Championships, finishing fifteenth at the latter in January. Competing at the 2022 Winter Olympics in the women's event, Mikutina placed eighteenth in the short program. Fourteenth in the free skate, she rose to fourteenth overall.

Days after the Olympics concluded, Vladimir Putin ordered an invasion of Ukraine, as a result of which the International Skating Union banned all Russian and Belarusian skaters from competing at the 2022 World Championships. Mikutina's birthplace of Kharkiv became the site of one of the largest and most destructive battles of the war, which she vocally protested. She placed fourteen at the World Championships.

=== 2022–2023 season ===
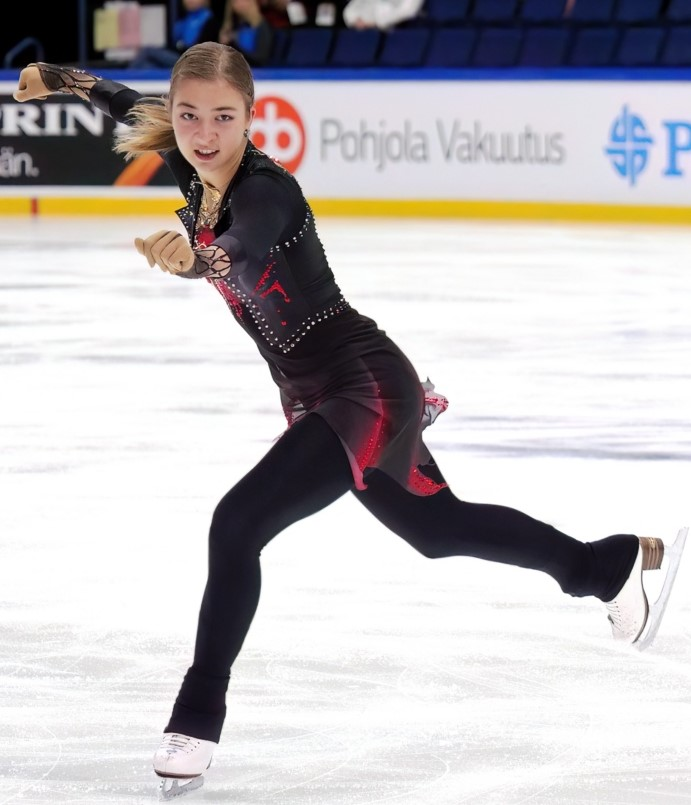
Olga Mikutina at the 2022 CS Finlandia Trophy

Mikutina continued to train, noting that "when I go on the ice, I can imagine myself in another world," away from worries relating to the war, while her father and grandparents continued to live in eastern Ukraine. She started her season with seventh and ninth placements at the 2022 CS Nebelhorn Trophy and 2022 CS Finlandia Trophy, respectively. She then went on to win gold at the 2022 Tayside Trophy. At the 2022 Grand Prix de France, Mikutina finished in tenth place after placing tenth in both the short and free programs. She was tenth as well at the 2022 NHK Trophy.

Assigned to Austria's championship berths in the second half of the season, Mikutina came twelfth at the 2023 European Championships and nineteenth at the 2023 World Championships.

=== 2023–2024 season ===
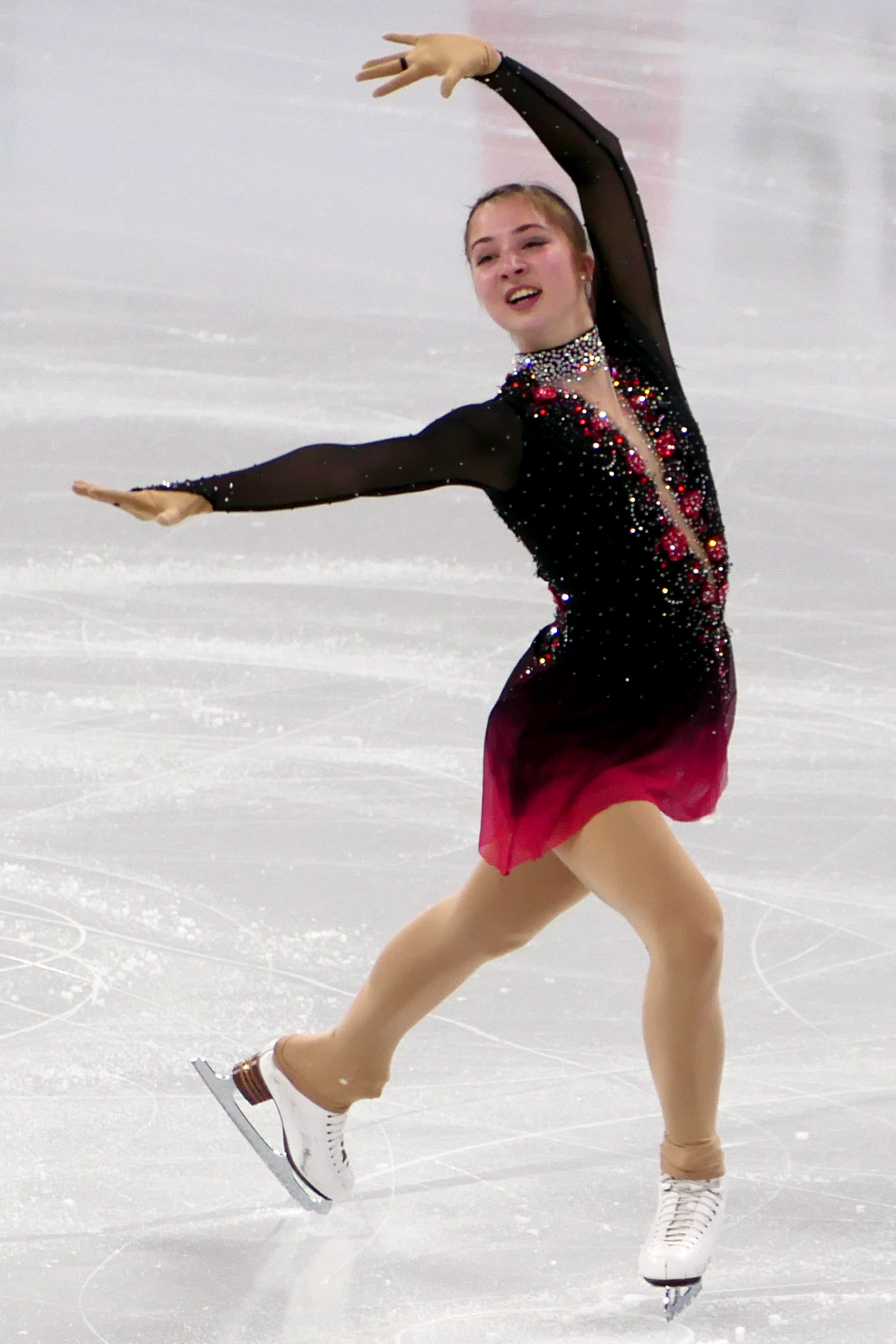
Mikutina at the 2024 World Championships

In October 2023, it was announced that Mikutina had switched training locations from Feldkirch, Austria to Montclair, New Jersey and that Galit Chait, Alexei Bychenko, and Evgeni Krasnopolski had joined her coaching team.

Mikutina made two appearances on the Challenger circuit, coming fifth at the 2023 CS Budapest Trophy and ninth at the 2023 CS Golden Spin of Zagreb, and winning gold at the Swiss Open and the Austrian championships. Assigned to the European Championships, she finished in eighth place. She then went on to win the bronze medal at the 2024 Bavarian Open, and came fourteenth at the 2024 World Championships.

=== 2024–2025 season ===
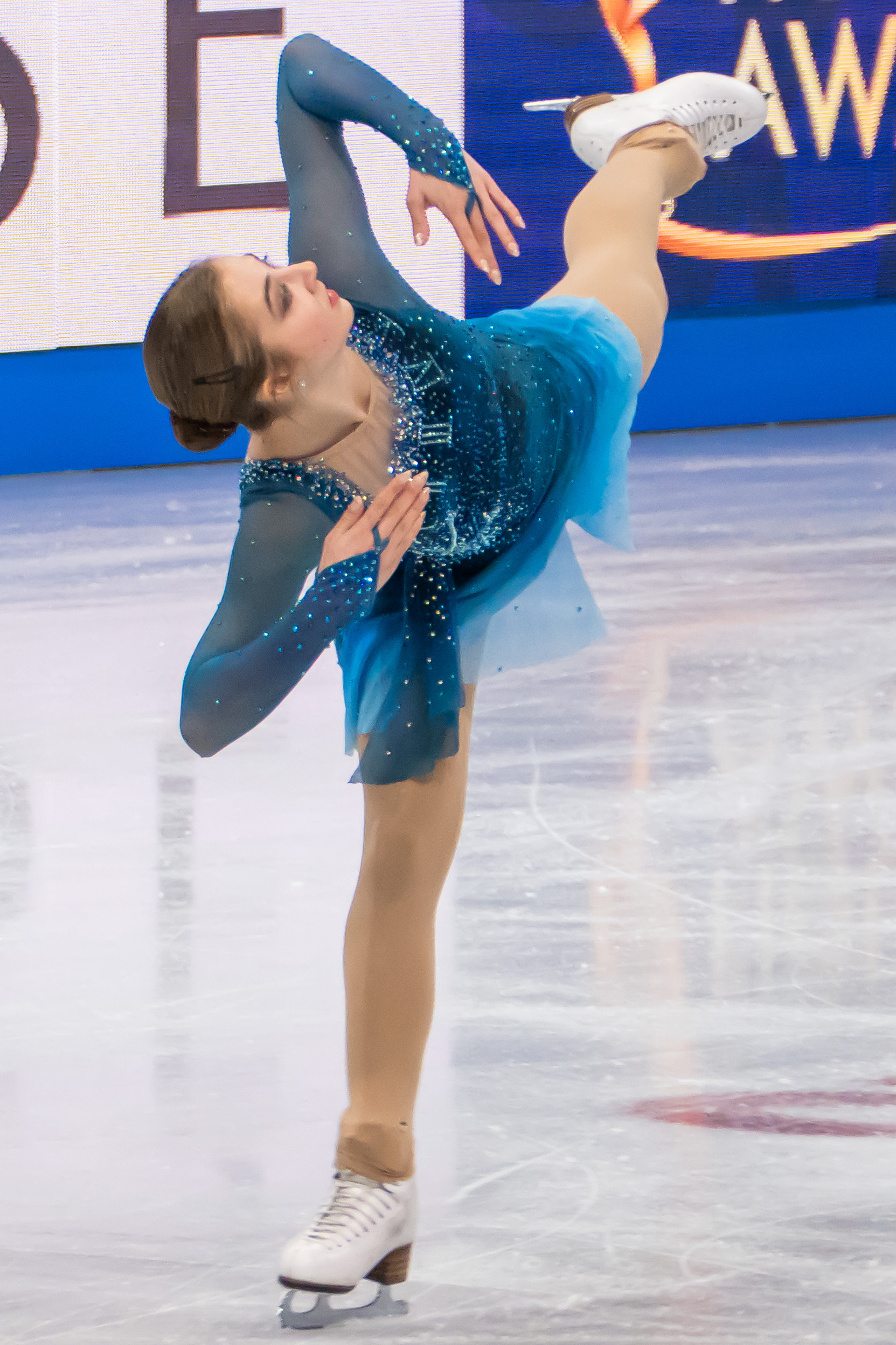
Mikutina performing a spiral during her free skate at the 2025 World Championships

Mikutina announced her new programs and said that her goal was to qualify for the 2026 Winter Olympics in an interview. She began the season by finishing tenth at the 2024 CS Nebelhorn Trophy. Assigned to compete on the 2024–25 Grand Prix series, she finished ninth at 2024 Skate America and eighth at the 2024 NHK Trophy.

In December, Mikutina won her fourth national title at the 2025 Austrian Championships. She was subsequently assigned to compete at the 2025 European Championships; however, she withdrew before the event due to health problems and was replaced by Flora Marie Schaller.

Two months later, Mikutina went on to compete at the 2025 World Championships, held in Boston, Massachusetts, United States. There, she placed seventeenth, which won Austria a quota for women's singles skating at the 2026 Winter Olympics.

=== 2025–2026 season: Milano Cortina Olympics ===
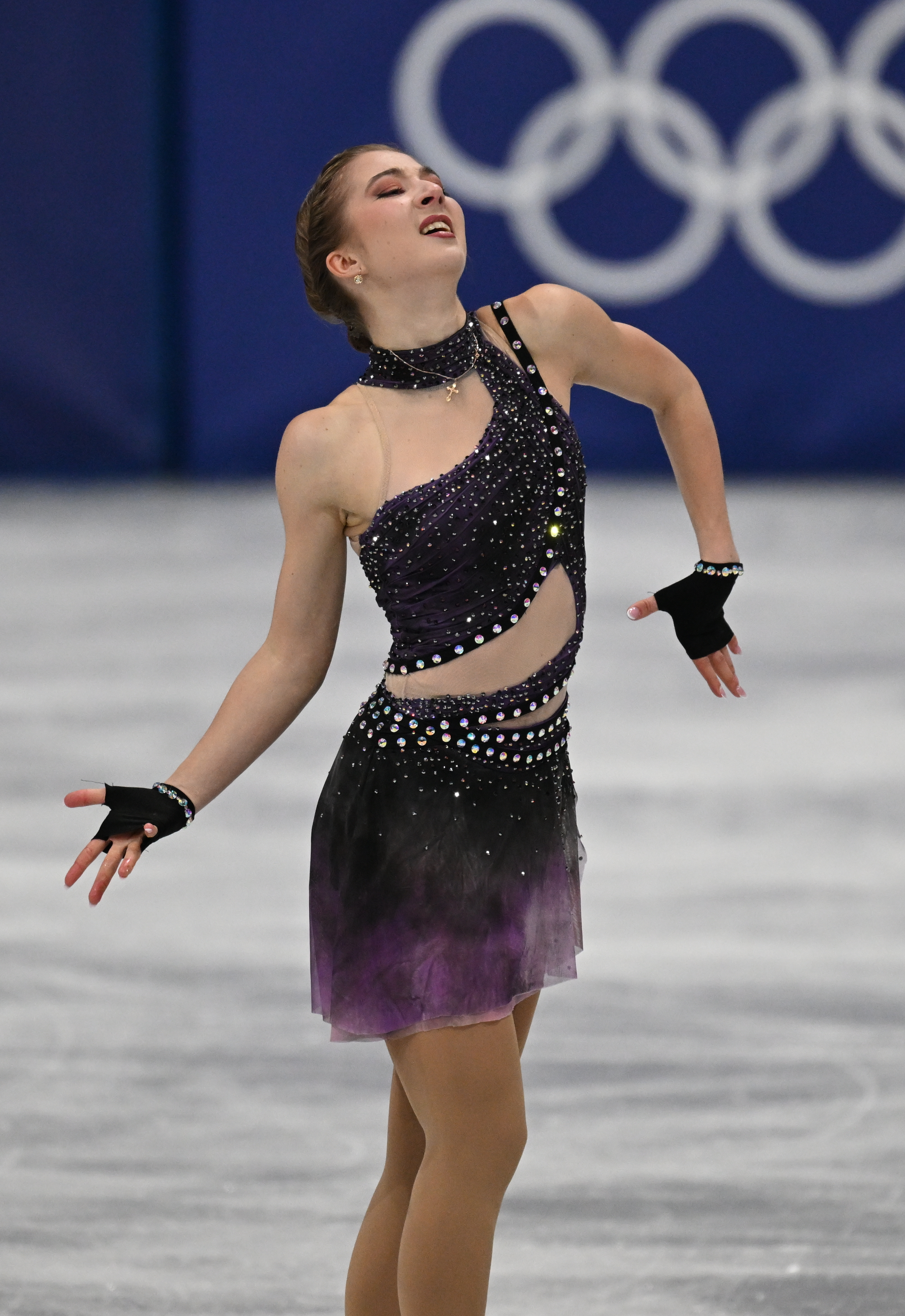
Mikutina during her free skate at the 2026 Winter Olympics

Mikutina opened her season in September with a sixth-place finish at the 2025 CS Nebelhorn Trophy. She then went on to win gold at the 2025 Lõunakeskus Trophy and at the 2025 Swiss Open. In November, Mikutina won bronze at the 2025 Ice Challenge and silver at the 2025 Cup of Innsbruck. The following month, she won her fifth national title at the 2025 Austrian Championships. Soon after the event, Mikutina was named to the 2026 Winter Olympic team.

In January, she competed at the 2026 European Championships in Sheffield, England, finishing in thirteenth place.

The following month, Mikutina competed at the 2026 Winter Olympics, where she finished eighteenth overall after placing seventeenth in the short program and eighteenth in the free skate. Her place of education, Montclair State University, hosted a watch party for her classmates and staff to support her. She shared after the Olympics, "I want to continue discovering my potential, developing my abilities, learning new elements and perfecting my skating. I want to truly enjoy the process, feel free on the ice, stay focused in competition and perform with powerful energy."

In March, Mikutina competed at the 2026 World Championships in Prague, Czech Republic, where she placed sixteenth in the short program and seventeenth in the free skate to finish seventeenth overall. "My highlight and personal best was at the Olympics, and that’s the most important thing," she said following her free skate. "Overall, I’m satisfied with my season. I had many competitions this season, but I think I handled it well."

=== 2026–2027 season ===
Mikutina begun the new season at the 2026 Tayside Trophy, winning the gold medal. Subsequently competing on the ISU Challenger Series, she placed fifth at the 2026 CS Budapest Trophy.

== Programs ==
Season	Short program	Free skating	Exhibition
2026–2027	New World by BFRND choreo. by Artem Fedorchenko	Nothing Else Matters by Metallica performed by The Rock Orchestra & Halocene choreo. by Rostislav Sinicyn	
2025–2026	Reckoning Song (In a Box III Version) by Asaf Avidan choreo. by Rostislav Sinicyn	Nothing Else Matters by Metallica performed by The Rock Orchestra & Halocene choreo. by Rostislav Sinicyn	
2024–2025	El Mariachi by Robert Rodriguez; Uccen (DWTS Remix) by Taalbi Brothers choreo. by Rostislav Sinicyn	La terre vue du ciel by Armand Amar choreo. by Rostislav Sinicyn	
2023–2024	El Mariachi by Robert Rodriguez; Uccen (DWTS Remix) by Taalbi Brothers choreo. by Rostislav Sinicyn	The Curse by Agnes Obel; Dawn of Faith by Eternal Eclipse choreo. by Rostislav Sinicyn	
2022–2023	My Nocturnal Serenade by Yohio choreo. by Rostislav Sinicyn	The Curse by Agnes Obel; Dawn of Faith by Eternal Eclipse choreo. by Rostislav Sinicyn	
2021–2022	My Nocturnal Serenade by Yohio choreo. by Rostislav Sinicyn	Primavera; Experience by Ludovico Einaudi choreo. by Rostislav Sinicyn	
2020–2021	Sing, Sing, Sing by Louis Prima performed by Trío Ladies choreo. by Rostislav Sinicyn	Primavera; Experience by Ludovico Einaudi choreo. by Rostislav Sinicyn	
2019–2020	Sing, Sing, Sing by Louis Prima performed by Trío Ladies choreo. by Rostislav Sinicyn	Tango (from Step Up 3D) by Bear McCreary choreo. by Rostislav Sinicyn	
2018–2019	Megapolis (Russian: Мегаполис) by Bel Suono choreo. by Rostislav Sinicyn	Tango (from Step Up 3D) by Bear McCreary choreo. by Rostislav Sinicyn	

== Competitive highlights ==
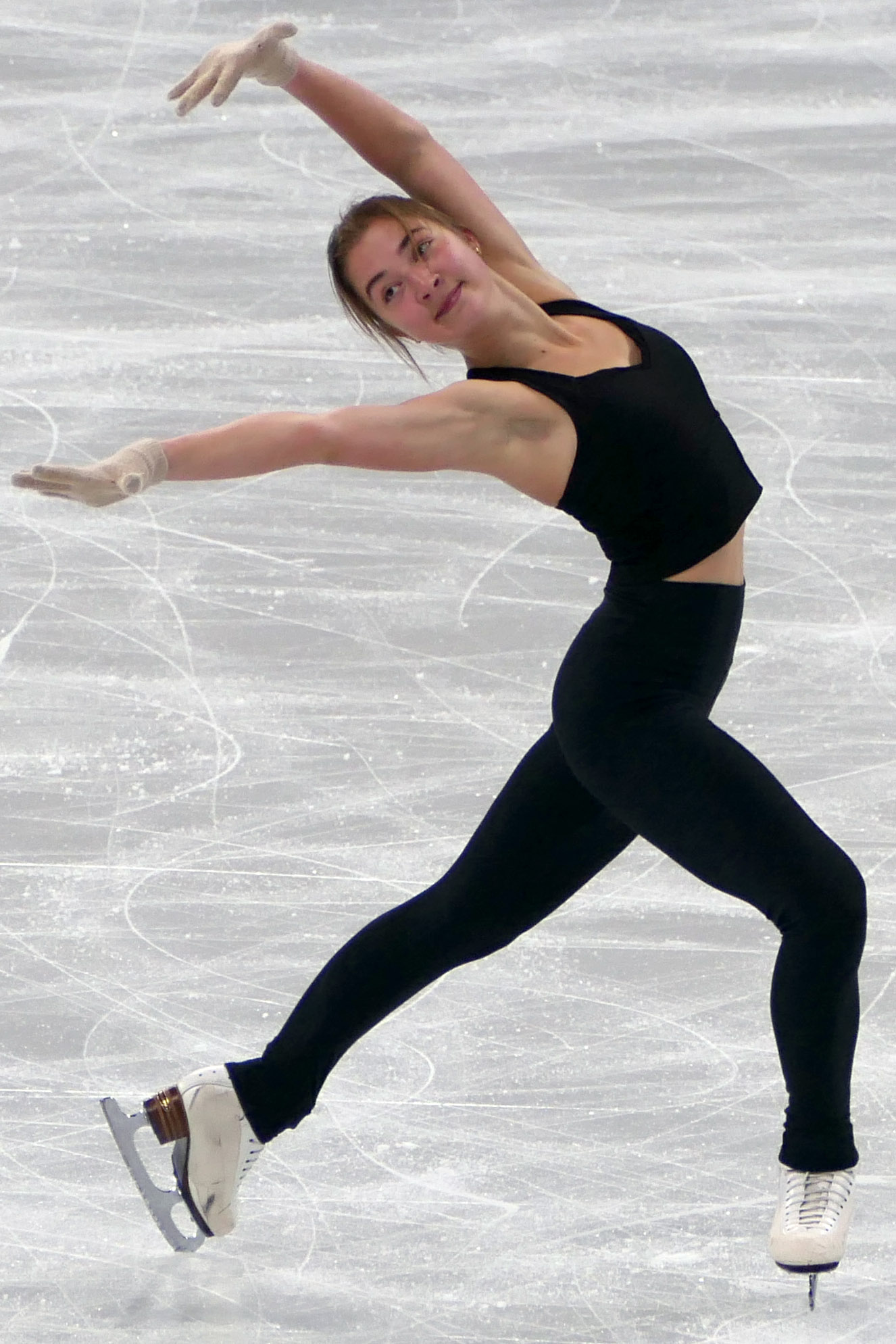
Mikutina at the 2024 World Championships during a practice session

- GP – Event of the ISU Grand Prix Series
- JGP – Event of the ISU Junior Grand Prix Series
- CS – Event of the ISU Challenger Series
- TBD – Assigned
- WD – Withdrew from competition
- C – Event was cancelled

Competition placements at senior level
Season	2019–20	2020–21	2021–22	2022–23	2023–24	2024–25	2025–26	2026–27
Winter Olympics			13th				18th	
World Championships	C	8th	14th	19th	14th	17th	17th	
European Championships	24th		14th	12th	8th		13th	
Austrian Championships	1st	1st	2nd		1st	1st	1st	
GP Cup of China								10th
GP France				10th				
GP NHK Trophy				10th		8th		
GP Rostelecom Cup			12th					
GP Skate America						9th		
CS Budapest Trophy					5th			5th
CS Finlandia Trophy				9th				
CS Golden Spin of Zagreb					9th			
CS Nebelhorn Trophy		13th		7th		10th	9th	
Bavarian Open					3rd			
Cup of Innsbruck							2nd	
Dragon Trophy					1st			
EduSport Trophy	4th							
Golden Bear of Zagreb	2nd							
Ice Challenge							3rd	
Istanbul Cup	1st							
Lõunakeskus Trophy							1st	
Sofia Trophy		1st						
Swiss Open					1st			
Tallink Hotels Cup		2nd						
Tallinn Trophy	3rd							
Tayside Trophy				1st				1st

Competition placements at junior level
Season	2017–18	2018–19	2019–20
World Junior Championships		18th	
Austrian Championships	3rd	1st	1st
JGP Austria		13th	
JGP Croatia			13th
JGP Czech Republic		9th	
JGP Latvia			17th
Bavarian Open	8th		
Coupe du Printemps	1st		
Cup of Nice	10th		
Cup of Tyrol	6th		
Denkova-Staviski Cup	2nd		
Egna Spring Trophy		3rd	
FBMA Trophy	1st		
Halloween Cup		1st	
IceLab Cup			1st
Ice Star			4th
Jégvirág Cup			1st
Skate Celje		1st	
Triglav Trophy	1st		
Volvo Open Cup		1st	

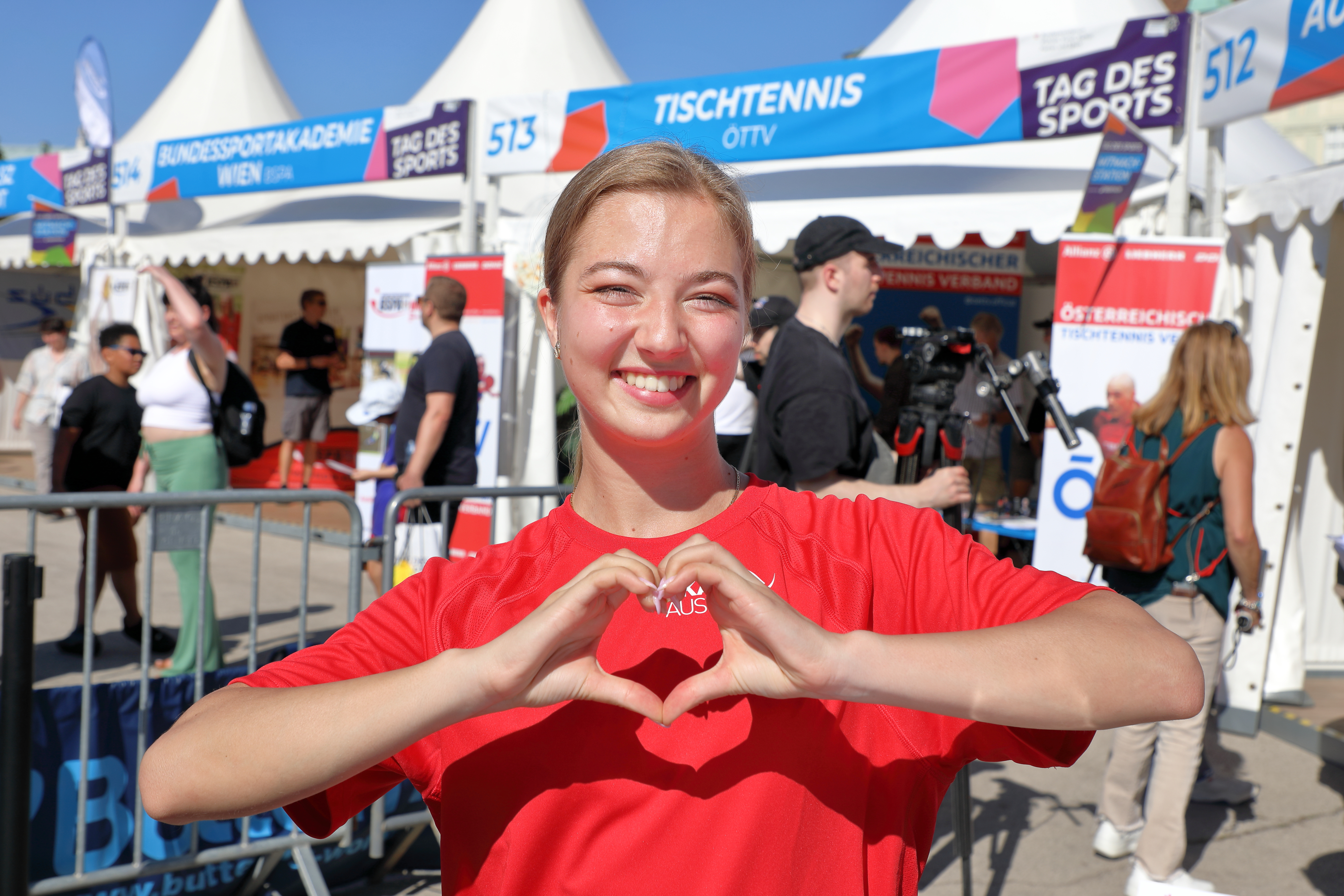
Mikutina at "Tag des Sports" 2025

== Detailed results ==
ISU personal best scores in the +5/-5 GOE System
Segment	Type	Score	Event
Total	TSS	198.77	2021 World Championships
Short program	TSS	67.18	2021 World Championships
Short program	TES	38.58	2021 World Championships
Short program	PCS	31.69	2026 CS Budapest Trophy
Free skating	TSS	131.59	2021 World Championships
Free skating	TES	70.34	2021 World Championships
Free skating	PCS	61.25	2021 World Championships

=== Senior level ===
Results in the 2019-20 season
Date	Event	SP		FS		Total	
Date	Event	P	Score	P	Score	P	Score
Oct 24-27, 2019	(Croatia) 2019 Golden Bear of Zagreb	1	62.32	4	110.67	2	172.99
Nov 11-17, 2019	(Estonia) 2019 Tallinn Trophy	4	53.40	3	109.08	3	162.48
Nov 22-24, 2019	(Austria) 2019 Eiscup Innsbruck	1	62.57	1	122.29	1	184.86
Nov 25-30, 2019	(Turkey) 2019 Bosphorus Cup	2	54.83	1	111.73	1	166.56
Dec 12-14, 2019	(Austria) 2020 Austrian Championships	2	56.67	1	114.98	1	171.65
Jan 8-12, 2020	(Romania) 2019 EduSport Trophy	4	58.92	4	101.20	4	160.12
Jan 20–26, 2020	(Austria) 2020 European Championships	21	53.19	24	76.96	24	130.15

Results in the 2020-21 season
Date	Event	SP		FS		Total	
Date	Event	P	Score	P	Score	P	Score
Sep 23–26, 2020	(Germany) 2020 CS Nebelhorn Trophy	12	44.14	15	85.26	13	129.40
Dec 10-12, 2020	(Austria) 2021 Austrian Championships	1	55.97	1	113.13	1	169.10
Feb 19-21, 2021	(Estonia) 2021 Tallink Hotels Cup	2	63.19	2	117.23	2	180.42
Mar 22–28, 2021	(Sweden) 2021 World Championships	11	67.18	7	131.59	8	198.77

Results in the 2021-22 season
Date	Event	SP		FS		Total	
Date	Event	P	Score	P	Score	P	Score
Nov 26-28, 2021	(Russia) 2021 Rostelecom Cup	10	57.09	12	104.00	12	161.09
Dec 9-11, 2021	(Austria) 2022 Austrian Championships	1	62.77	2	111.06	2	173.83
Jan 10–16, 2022	(Estonia) 2022 European Championships	12	60.16	17	103.85	15	164.01
Feb 8–10, 2022	(China) 2022 Winter Olympics	17	61.14	13	121.06	13	182.20
Mar 21–27, 2022	(France) 2022 World Championships	15	62.14	13	120.84	14	182.98

Results in the 2022-23 season
Date	Event	SP		FS		Total	
Date	Event	P	Score	P	Score	P	Score
Sep 21–24, 2022	(Germany) 2022 CS Nebelhorn Trophy	4	58.31	9	97.22	7	155.53
Oct 5–9, 2022	(Finland) 2022 CS Finlandia Trophy	15	52.81	7	107.62	9	160.43
Oct 15–16, 2022	(United Kingdom) 2022 Tayside Trophy	2	60.07	1	114.63	1	174.70
Nov 4–6, 2022	2022 Grand Prix de France	10	56.00	10	103.99	10	159.99
Nov 18–20, 2022	(Japan) 2022 NHK Trophy	10	56.95	9	116.41	10	173.36
Jan 25–29, 2023	(Finland) 2023 European Championships	4	62.78	18	96.30	12	159.08
Mar 22–26, 2023	(Japan) 2023 World Championships	20	57.05	18	115.26	19	172.31

Results in the 2023-24 season
Date	Event	SP		FS		Total	
Date	Event	P	Score	P	Score	P	Score
Oct 13–15, 2023	(Hungary) 2023 CS Budapest Trophy	6	61.48	5	108.01	5	169.49
Oct 26-529 2023	(Switzerland) 2023 Swiss Ice Skating Open	2	59.09	2	91.97	1	151.05
Dec 6–9, 2023	(Croatia) 2023 CS Golden Spin of Zagreb	3	58.08	10	95.82	9	153.90
Dec 13-17, 2023	(Austria) 2024 Austrian Championships	2	58.62	1	114.31	1	172.93
Jan 25–29, 2023	(Finland) 2023 European Championships	5	63.71	10	109.75	8	173.46
Jan 30 – Feb 4, 2024	(Germany) 2024 Bavarian Open	2	57.01	2	113.52	3	170.53
Feb 9-11, 2024	(Slovenia) 2024 Dragon Trophy	1	60.14	2	112.91	1	173.05
Mar 22–26, 2023	(Japan) 2023 World Championships	16	60.77	13	116.99	14	177.76

Results in the 2024-25 season
Date	Event	SP		FS		Total	
Date	Event	P	Score	P	Score	P	Score
Sep 18–21, 2024	(Germany) 2024 CS Nebelhorn Trophy	9	56.47	9	104.37	10	160.84
Oct 18–20, 2024	(United States) 2024 Skate America	9	56.81	9	109.96	9	166.77
Nov 8–10, 2024	(Japan) 2024 NHK Trophy	8	60.94	10	108.99	8	169.93
Dec 11-15, 2024	(Austria) 2025 Austrian Championships	1	67.88	1	120.59	1	188.47
Mar 25–30, 2025	(United States) 2025 World Championships	17	59.63	19	106.19	17	165.82

Results in the 2025–26 season
Date	Event	SP		FS		Total	
Date	Event	P	Score	P	Score	P	Score
Sep 25–27, 2025	(Germany) 2025 CS Nebelhorn Trophy	10	53.13	9	98.78	9	151.91
Oct 15–19, 2025	(Estonia) 2025 Lõunakeskus Trophy	1	64.17	1	106.87	1	171.04
Nov 5–9, 2025	(Austria) 2025 Ice Challenge	3	55.06	2	114.61	3	169.67
Nov 13–16, 2025	(Austria) 2025 Cup of Innsbruck	3	53.91	2	111.16	2	165.07
Dec 10–13, 2025	(Austria) 2026 Austrian Championships	1	64.48	1	123.14	1	187.62
Jan 13–18, 2026	(United Kingdom) 2026 European Championships	15	53.90	12	112.65	13	166.55
Feb 17–19, 2026	(Italy) 2026 Winter Olympics	17	61.72	18	123.87	18	185.59
Mar 24-29, 2026	(Czech Republic) 2026 World Championships	16	60.11	17	109.73	17	169.84

Results in the 2026–27 season
Date	Event	SP		FS		Total	
Date	Event	P	Score	P	Score	P	Score
Oct 10–11, 2026	(United Kingdom) 2026 Tayside Trophy	3	65.20	1	121.59	1	186.79
Oct 15–18, 2026	(Hungary) 2026 CS Budapest Trophy	5	62.75	8	111.04	5	173.79
Nov 6–8, 2026	2026 Cup of China	12	55.41	10	102.45	10	157.86

=== Junior results ===
2019–2020 season
Date	Event	SP	FS	Total
15–17 February 2020	2020 Jégvirág Cup	1; 55.84	1; 110.72	1; 166.56
12–14 December 2019	2020 Austrian Junior Championships	1; 54.06	2; 97.99	1; 152.05
1–3 November 2019	2019 Icelab Cup	1; 57.65	1; 102.68	1; 160.33
14–17 October 2019	2019 Ice Star	3; 56.57	6; 94.52	4; 151.09
25–28 September 2019	2019 JGP Croatia	13; 46.41	12; 93.70	13; 140.11
4–7 September 2019	2019 JGP Latvia	21; 42.36	13; 88.06	17; 130.42
2018–2019 season
Date	Event	SP	FS	Total
28–31 March 2019	2019 Egna Spring Trophy	2; 53.52	3; 93.72	3; 147.24
4–10 March 2019	2019 World Junior Championships	20; 48.75	15; 96.59	18; 145.34
13–16 December 2018	2019 Austrian Junior Championships	1; 53.87	1; 100.32	1; 154.19
22–25 November 2018	2018 Skate Celje	1; 55.23	2; 90.31	1; 145.54
6–11 November 2018	2018 Volvo Open Cup	1; 54.22	1; 95.37	1; 149.59
19–21 October 2018	2018 Halloween Cup	1; 58.94	1; 108.10	1; 167.04
26–29 September 2018	2018 JGP Czech Republic	8; 52.37	13; 90.73	9; 143.10
29 August – 1 September 2018	2018 JGP Austria	13; 45.01	15; 74.50	13; 119.51
2017–2018 season
4 April 2018	2018 Triglav Trophy	1; 57.53	1; 97.80	1; 155.53
13–16 March 2018	2018 Coupe du Printemps	1; 57.53	1; 97.80	1; 155.33
26–31 January 2018	2018 Bavarian Open	7; 47.94	8; 88.75	8; 136.69
4–7 January 2018	2018 FBMA Trophy	1; 45.14	1; 78.14	1; 123.28
13–16 December 2017	2018 Austrian Junior Championships	3; 45.79	3; 85.79	3; 131.58
20–25 November 2017	2017 Cup of Tyrol	18; 41.28	4; 88.21	6; 129.49
31 October – 4 November 2017	2017 Denkova-Staviski Cup	2; 52.09	2; 91.66	2; 143.75
11–15 October 2017	2017 Cup of Nice	7; 46.36	10; 83.57	10; 129.93
