= Irish Figure Skating Championships =

Recurring figure skating competition

- Status: Active
- Genre: National championships
- Frequency: Annual
- Venue: Dundee Ice Arena
- Location: Dundee, Scotland
- Country: (Republic of Ireland) Ireland
- Organiser: Ice Skating Association of Ireland

The Irish Figure Skating Championships are an annual figure skating competition organized by the Ice Skating Association of Ireland to crown the national champions of Ireland. The first Irish Championships were held in 2008 in Dundalk. Medals are awarded in men's singles, women's singles, and ice dance at the senior and junior levels, although every discipline may not necessarily be held every year due to a lack of participants.

== History ==
Competitive figure skating is relatively new to Ireland. The Republic of Ireland Ice Skating Association was established in 1995, though it adopted its current name – the Ice Skating Association of Ireland – in 2008. A number of milestone events occurred in 2008. Ireland joined the International Skating Union, while the first Irish Championships were held in Dundalk. In 2008, Clara Peters became the first Irish skater to compete at an international competition – the Czech Skate in Ostrava, Czech Republic – and in 2009, she represented Ireland at both the European Figure Skating Championships and the World Figure Skating Championships.

No competition was held in 2021 due to the COVID-19 pandemic. Since 2022, the Irish Championships have been held at the Dundee Ice Arena in Dundee, Scotland, in the United Kingdom. In 2022, Laura and Kevin Hegarty became the first skaters to compete in ice dance for Ireland.

== Senior medalists ==
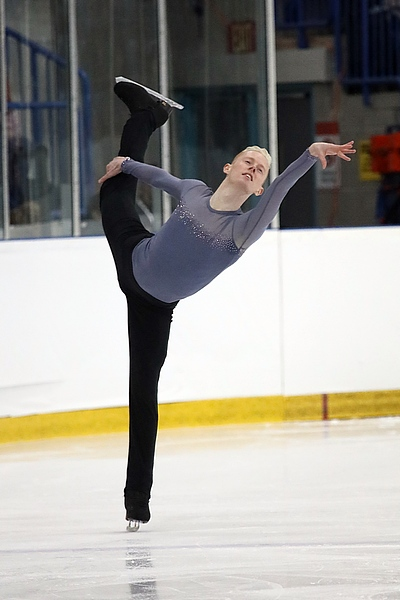
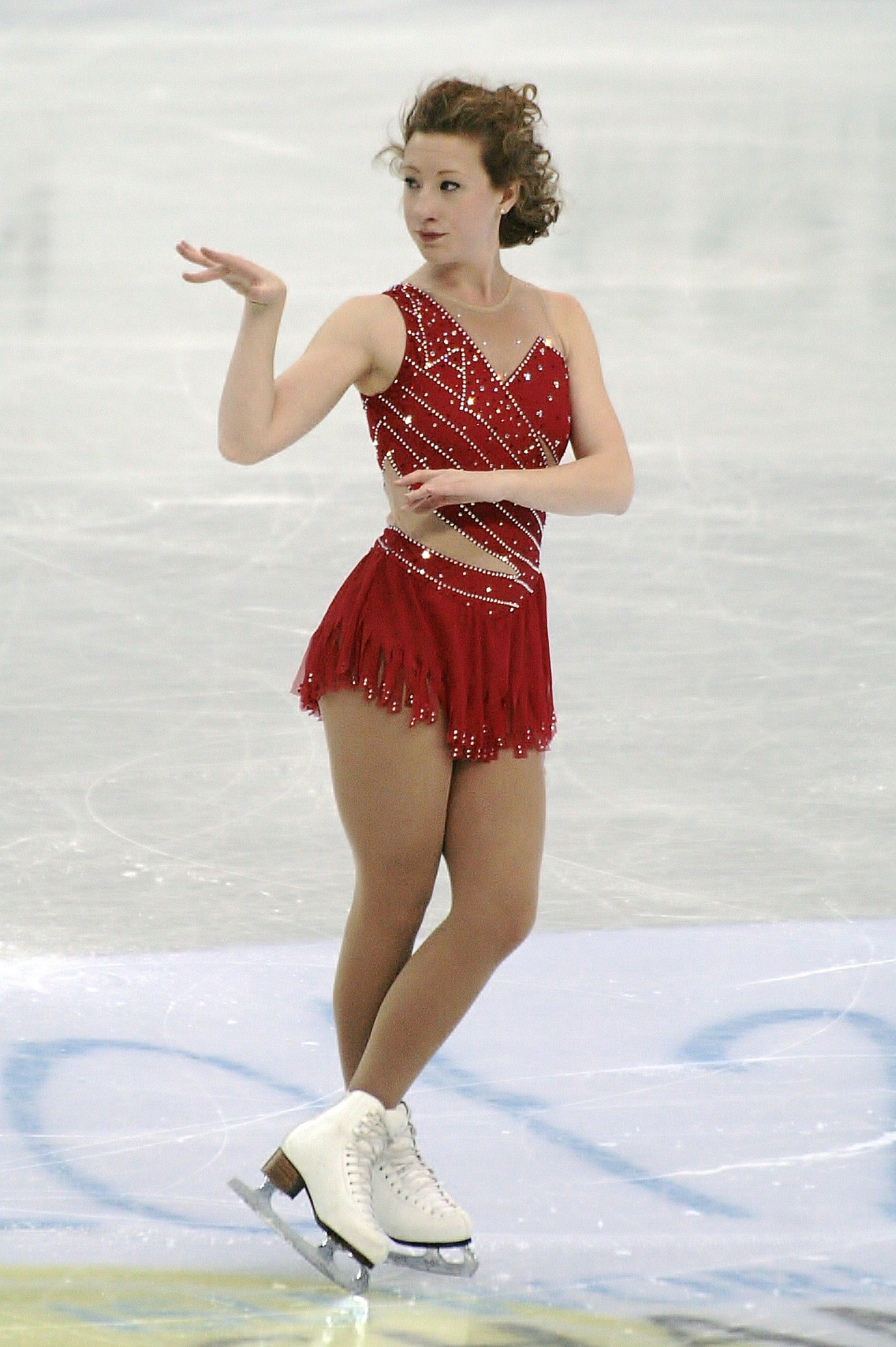
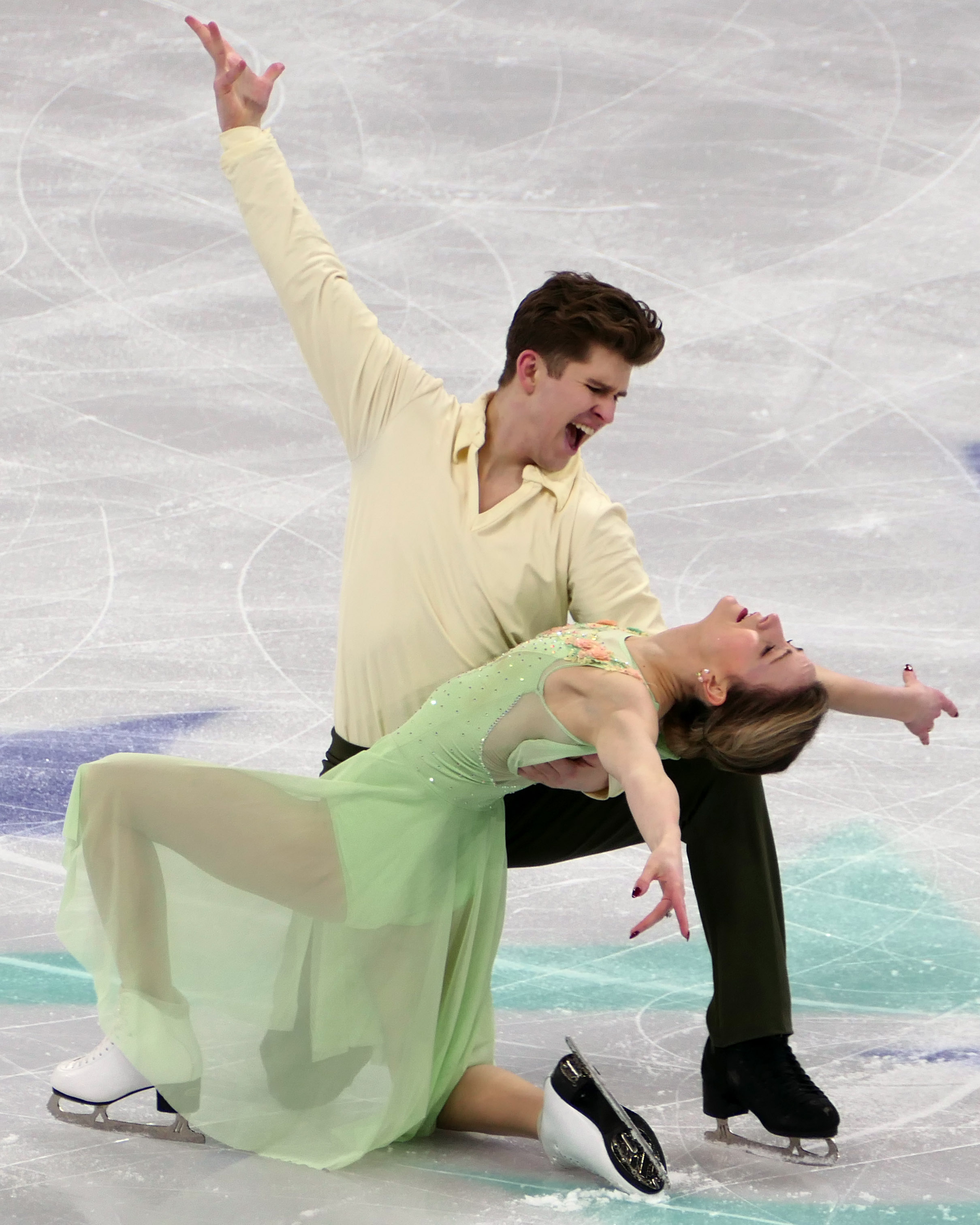
From left to right: Conor Stakelum, five-time Irish champion in men's singles; Clara Peters, eight-time Irish champion in women's singles; and Carolane Soucisse and Shane Firus, three-time Irish champions in ice dance

=== Men's singles ===
Men's event medalists
Year	Location	Gold	Silver	Bronze	Ref.
No men's competitors prior to 2010
2010	Dundalk	Vivian Parnell-Murphy	No other competitors		
2011	No competition held				
2012	Dundonald	Brendan Dorrian	No other competitors		
2013	Dundonald	Brendan Dorrian	No other competitors		
2014	Dundonald	Conor Stakelum	No other competitors		
2015	Belfast	Conor Stakelum	No other competitors		
2016	(United Kingdom) London, England	Conor Stakelum	No other competitors		
2017	(United Kingdom) London, England	Conor Stakelum	No other competitors		
2018	(United Kingdom) London, England	Conor Stakelum	Samuel McAllister	No other competitors	
2019	(United Kingdom) London, England	Samuel McAllister	Conor Stakelum	No other competitors	
2020	(United Kingdom) London, England	Samuel McAllister	No other competitors		
2021	Competition cancelled due to the COVID-19 pandemic				
2022	(United Kingdom) Dundee, Scotland	Samuel McAllister	Conor Stakelum	No other competitors	
2023	(United Kingdom) Dundee, Scotland	Dillon Judge	No other competitors		
2024	(United Kingdom) Dundee, Scotland	No men's competitors			
2025	(United Kingdom) Dundee, Scotland	Dillon Judge	No other competitors		
2026	No competition held				

=== Women's singles ===
Women's event medalists
Year	Location	Gold	Silver	Bronze	Ref.
2008	Dundalk	Clara Peters	No other competitors		
2009	Dundalk	Clara Peters	No other competitors		
2010	Dundalk	Clara Peters	No other competitors		
2011	No competition held				
2012	Dundonald	Clara Peters	No other competitors		
2013	Dundonald	Clara Peters	No other competitors		
2014	Dundonald	Clara Peters	No other competitors		
2015	Belfast	Clara Peters	No other competitors		
2016	(United Kingdom) London, England	Clara Peters	No other competitors		
No women's competitors since 2016

=== Ice dance ===
Ice dance event medalists
Year	Location	Gold	Silver	Bronze	Ref.
No ice dance competitors prior to 2023
2023	(United Kingdom) Dundee, Scotland	Carolane Soucisse; Shane Firus	No other competitors		
2024	(United Kingdom) Dundee, Scotland	Carolane Soucisse; Shane Firus	No other competitors		
2025	(United Kingdom) Dundee, Scotland	Carolane Soucisse; Shane Firus	No other competitors		
2026	No competition held				

== Junior medalists ==
=== Men's singles ===
Junior men's event medalists
Year	Location	Gold	Silver	Bronze	Ref.
No junior men's competitors prior to 2012
2012	Dundonald	Conor Stakelum	No other competitors		
2013	Dundonald	Conor Stakelum	No other competitors		
2014–15	No junior men's competitors				
2016	(United Kingdom) London, England	Samuel McAllister	No other competitors		
2017	(United Kingdom) London, England	Samuel McAllister	No other competitors		
2018–19	(United Kingdom) London, England	No junior men's competitors			
2020	(United Kingdom) London, England	Dillon Judge	No other competitors		
2021	Competition cancelled due to the COVID-19 pandemic				
2022	(United Kingdom) Dundee, Scotland	Dillon Judge	No other competitors		
No junior men's competitors since 2022

=== Women's singles ===
Junior women's event medalists
Year	Location	Gold	Silver	Bronze	Ref.
No junior women's competitors prior to 2012
2012	Dundonald	Deirdre Faegre	No other competitors		
2013	Dundonald	Deirdre Faegre	No other competitors		
2014	Dundonald	Ciara Hoey	No other competitors		
2015	Belfast	Ciara Hoey	Fianait Bligh	No other competitors	
2016	(United Kingdom) London, England	Ciara Hoey	No other competitors		
2017	(United Kingdom) London, England	Ciara Hoey	No other competitors		
2018	(United Kingdom) London, England	No junior women's competitors			
2019	(United Kingdom) London, England	Elizabeth Golding	No other competitors		
2020	(United Kingdom) London, England	Sophia Tkacheva	Elizabeth Golding	Dracy Condon	
2021	Competition cancelled due to the COVID-19 pandemic				
2022	(United Kingdom) Dundee, Scotland	Robyn Foster	Sophia Tkacheva	No other competitors	
2023	(United Kingdom) Dundee, Scotland	Sophia Tkacheva	Ciera Turner-Frick	No other competitors	
2024	(United Kingdom) Dundee, Scotland	Allie Peterson	Saoirse O'Sullivan	No other competitors	
2025	(United Kingdom) Dundee, Scotland	Julianna Farrell	Eeva O'Briend	No other competitors	
2026	No competition held				

=== Ice dance ===
Junior ice dance event medalists
Year	Location	Gold	Silver	Bronze	Ref.
No junior ice dance competitors prior to 2022
2022	(United Kingdom) Dundee, Scotland	Laura Hegarty; Kevin Hegarty	No other competitors		
2023	(United Kingdom) Dundee, Scotland	Laura Hegarty; Kevin Hegarty	No other competitors		
No junior ice dance competitors since 2023
