= Kristina Lisovskaja =

Estonian figure skater (born 2000)

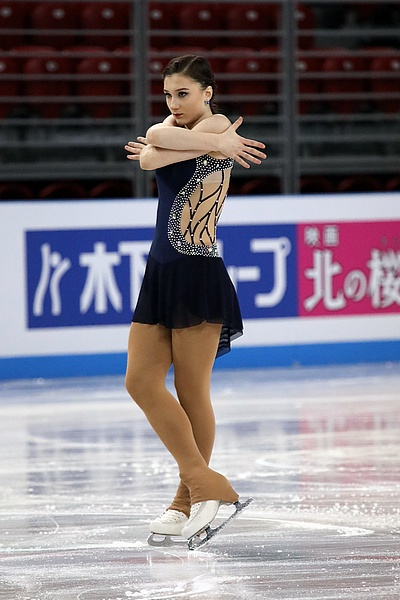
- Kristina Lisovskaja at the 2018 World Junior Championships

Personal information
- Other names: Kristina Shkuleta-Gromova
- Born: 15 September 2000 (age 26) Tallinn, Estonia
- Height: 1.67 m (5 ft 5 1/2 in)

Figure skating career
- Country: Estonia
- Discipline: Women's singles
- Coach: Alina Škuleta-Gromova
- Skating club: EstIceClub
- Began skating: 2005

Medal record
Estonian Championships
Silver medal – second place	2018 Tallinn	Singles
Bronze medal – third place	2016 Tallinn	Singles
Bronze medal – third place	2019 Tallinn	Singles
Bronze medal – third place	2021 Tallinn	Singles
Bronze medal – third place	2024 Tallinn	Singles
Bronze medal – third place	2026 Tallinn	Singles

Kristina Lisovskaja (née Škuleta-Gromova; born 15 September 2000) is an Estonian figure skater. She has won 18 senior international medals and represented Estonia at seven ISU Championships. She is a six-time Estonian national medalist and a three-time Estonian Junior national champion.

== Career ==
Lisovskaja began learning to skate in 2005. At the Estonian Championships, Lisovskaja has won three gold medals at the junior championships (2016–18), one silver medal at the senior championships (2018), and four bronze medals at the senior championships (2016, 2019, 2021, 2024).

She debuted on the ISU Junior Grand Prix series in September 2014 and competed at four consecutive World Junior Championships, beginning with the 2015 event in Tallinn, where she placed 34th.

The following season, she finished 29th at the 2016 World Junior Championships in Debrecen, Hungary.

Lisovskaja made her senior international debut in October 2016 at the Golden Bear of Zagreb. She won two senior medals – gold at the Jegvirag Cup in Hungary and bronze at the Egna Trophy in Italy. She continued to compete as a junior and placed 28th at the 2017 World Junior Championships in Taipei, Taiwan.

The following season, Lisovskaja was selected to compete at the 2018 European Championships in Moscow, Russia, where she finished 25th. She was again assigned to compete at the World Junior Championships, where she placed 34th.

In 2024, Lisovskaja was selected for her second European Championships, where she finished 27th.

In 2025, she competed at the ISU Skate to Milano competition, where several quotas for the 2026 Winter Olympics were available. Estonia had already qualified one quota and had the opportunity to compete for a second at the competition. Lisovskaja was given the opportunity to attempt to qualify the quota after an internal test skate. She earned a personal best for overall score after she placed eight in the short program and free skate to finish in eighth place overall. However, she did not win a quota.

== Programs ==
Season	Short program	Free skating
2025–2026	My Love by Sharon Kovacs choreo. by Jūlija Tepliha	Requiem for a Dream; Ghosts; Summer Overture; Lux Aeterna by Clint Mansell & Kronos Quartet choreo. by Jūlija Tepliha
2024–2025	Freed from Desire; Freed from Desire (Mr. Jack Club Mix); Freed from Desire (XTM Remix Edit) by Gala, Maurizio Molella, Carmeni Filippo, & Phil Jay choreo. by Jūlija Tepliha, Normunds Purvinskis	Cats by Andrew Lloyd Webber; Macavity: The Mystery Cat performed by Taylor Swift; Memory performed by Lucy Thomas choreo. by Jūlija Tepliha, Normunds Purvinskis
2023–2024	Caught Out in the Rain by Beth Hart choreo. by Alina Shkuleta-Gromova	Lighthouse by Patrick Watson choreo. by Alina Shkuleta-Gromova
2022–2023	O Fortuna by Carl Orff	The Phantom of the Opera by Andrew Lloyd Webber
2021–2022	All That Jazz (from Chicago)	The Phantom of the Opera by Andrew Lloyd Webber
2020–2021	The Show Must Go On by Queen	Still Loving You by Scorpions
2019–2020		
2018–2019	Feeling Good by Michael Bublé	The Phantom of the Opera by Andrew Lloyd Webber; All I Ask of You; The Phantom of the Opera
2017–2018	Stone Cold by Demi Lovato	Earthquake by Hayko
2016–2017 2015–2016	Adagio performed by Lara Fabian	Kung Fu Piano: Cello Ascends by The Piano Guys
2014–2015	Nocturne No. 20 by Frédéric Chopin	Avatar by James Horner

== Competitive highlights ==
- JGP – Event of the ISU Junior Grand Prix Series
- CS – Event of the ISU Challenger Series
- TBD – Assigned
- WD – Withdrew from event

Competition placements at senior level
Season	2014–15	2015–16	2016–17	2017–18	2018–19	2019–20	2020–21	2021–22	2022–23	2023–24	2024–25	2025–26	2026–27
European Championships				25th						27th		26th	
Estonian Championships	5th	3rd	4th	2nd	3rd	5th	3rd	7th	4th	3rd	4th	3rd	
CS Budapest Trophy							9th		7th				
CS Finlandia Trophy									13th	15th			
CS Golden Spin of Zagreb								9th		10th	19th		
CS Ice Star						17th							
CS Inge Solar					15th								
CS Lombardia Trophy				15th	WD			12th					
CS Nebelhorn Trophy				12th									
CS Tallinn Trophy			16th	12th	22nd						6th	8th	12th
CS Trialeti Trophy												17th	
CS Trophée Métropole Nice											9th		
CS Warsaw Cup						20th		15th	16th			6th	
Bellu Memorial											8th		
Coupe du Printemps									5th				
Crystal Skate Open												2nd	
Crystal Skate Spring												1st	
Cup of Tyrol			16th										
Daugava Open Cup											2nd	1st	
Egna Spring Trophy			3rd										
Golden Bear of Zagreb			19th										
Ice Star							4th						
Jégvirág Cup			1st										
Kaunas Ice Autumn Cup										2nd			
Lõunakeskus Trophy										1st		2nd	
Maria Olszewska Memorial												1st	
Mentor Toruń Cup			8th										
Santa Claus Cup						3rd			3rd				
Silver Skate Cup												1st	
Skate to Milano												8th	
Tallink Hotels Cup							10th	1st	3rd	5th			
Tallinn Trophy									3rd	3rd			
Volvo Open Cup (Note: 47th Volvo Cup Open)									2nd				
Volvo Open Cup (Note: 48th Volvo Cup Open)				21st					5th	2nd			
Wolmar Spring Cup									2nd				

Competition placements at junior level
Season	2013–14	2014–15	2015–16	2016–17	2017–18	2018–19
World Junior Championships		34th	29th	28th	34th	
Estonian Championships	7th	3rd	1st	1st	1st	3rd
JGP Belarus					10th	
JGP Czech Republic		23rd				
JGP Estonia				12th		
JGP Germany				25th		
JGP Latvia			22nd			
JGP Poland					8th	
JGP Slovenia						31st
JGP Spain			18th			
EYEOF				5th		
Ice Star			2nd			
Lombardia Trophy				15th		
Rostelecom Crystal		4th				
Tallinn Trophy	8th	3rd	8th			
Volvo Open Cup		11th	4th			

== Detailed results ==
ISU personal best scores in the +5/-5 GOE System
Segment	Type	Score	Event
Total	TSS	158.69	2025 Skate to Milano
Short program	TSS	57.87	2022 CS Budapest Trophy
Short program	TES	31.20	2023 CS Denis Ten Memorial Challenge
Short program	PCS	26.78	2025 Skate to Milano
Free skating	TSS	105.52	2021 CS Golden Spin of Zagreb
Free skating	TES	54.32	2021 CS Golden Spin of Zagreb
Free skating	PCS	54.63	2025 Skate to Milano

=== Senior results ===
Results in the 2026–27 season
Date	Event	SP		FS		Total	
Date	Event	P	Score	P	Score	P	Score
Nov 16–22, 2026	(Estonia) 2026 CS Tallinn Trophy	18	49.87	14	99.56	12	149.43

Results in the 2025–26 season
Date	Event	SP		FS		Total	
Date	Event	P	Score	P	Score	P	Score
Sep 18–21, 2025	(China) 2025 Skate to Milano	8	57.36	8	101.33	8	158.69
Sep 25–28, 2025	(Estonia) 2025 Crystal Skate Open	2	58.25	1	107.64	2	165.89
Oct 8–11, 2025	(Georgia (country)) 2025 CS Trialeti Trophy	17	49.03	17	92.76	17	141.79
Oct 15–19, 2025	(Estonia) 2025 Lõunakeskus Trophy	2	56.23	2	89.20	2	145.43
Nov 19–23, 2025	(Poland) 2025 CS Warsaw Cup	5	54.08	6	102.52	6	156.60
Nov 25–30, 2025	(Estonia) 2025 CS Tallinn Trophy	7	55.38	9	99.32	8	154.70
Dec 13–14, 2025	(Estonia) 2026 Estonian Championships	2	58.35	3	107.07	3	165.42
Jan 13–18, 2026	(United Kingdom) 2026 European Championships	26	49.62	—N/a	—N/a	26	49.62
Jan 29 – Feb 1, 2026	(Latvia) 2026 Silver Skate Winter Cup	1	55.34	2	101.78	1	157.12
Feb 24-28, 2026	(Poland) 2026 Maria Olszewska Memorial	1	56.91	2	101.37	1	158.28
Mar 12-15, 2026	(Latvia) 2026 Daugava Open Cup	1	54.26	2	105.36	1	159.62
Mar 19-22, 2026	(Estonia) 2026 Crystal Skate Spring	1	54.71	1	99.86	1	154.57
