= Lõunakeskus Trophy =

Annual figure skating competition

- Status: Active
- Genre: International competition
- Frequency: Annual
- Venue: Lõunakeskus Ice Hall
- Location: Tartu
- Country: Estonia
- Organizer: Estonian Skating Union & Figure Skating Club IK Tartu

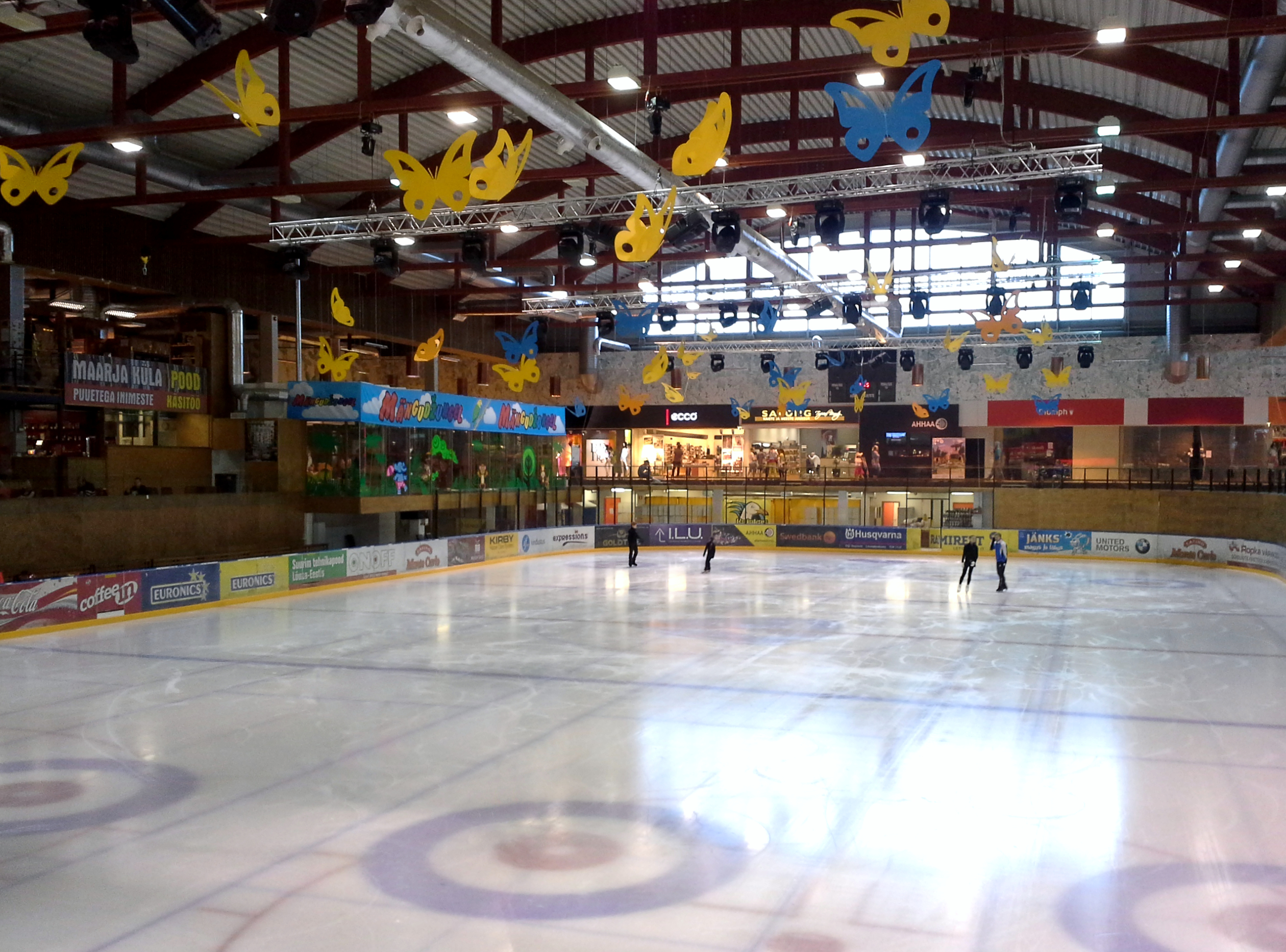
The Lõunakeskus Ice Hall in Tartu, Estonia, home of the Lõunakeskus Trophy

The Lõunakeskus Trophy is an annual figure skating competition sanctioned by the International Skating Union (ISU), organized and hosted by the Estonian Skating Union (Estonian: Eesti Uisuliit) and the Figure Skating Club IK Tartu at the Lõunakeskus Ice Hall in Tartu, Estonia. The competition debuted in 2013, but did not become an ISU sanctioned event until the 2023–24 figure skating season. Medals may be awarded in men's and women's singles at the senior and junior levels, although each event may not necessarily be held every year due to a lack of participants.

== Senior medalists ==
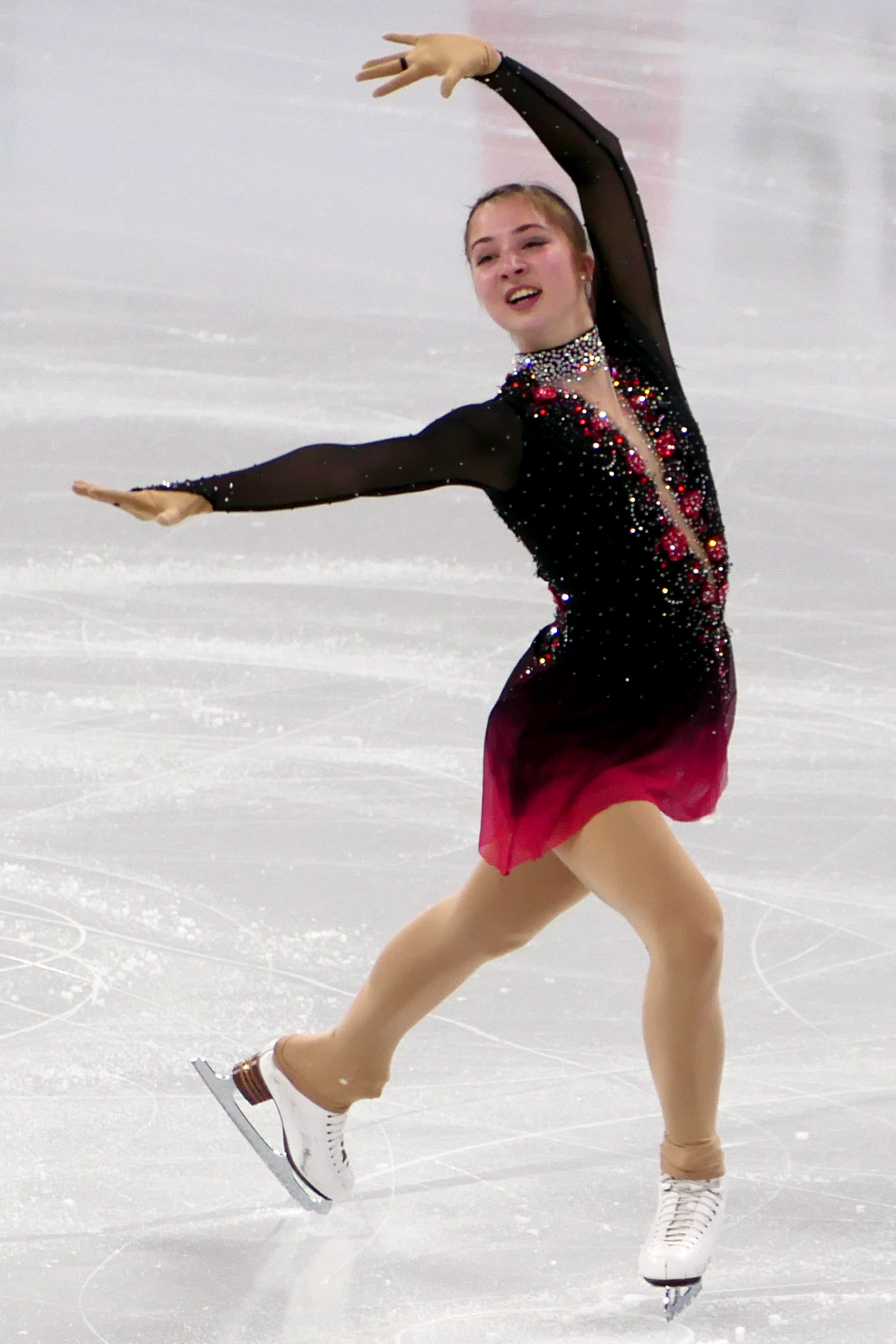
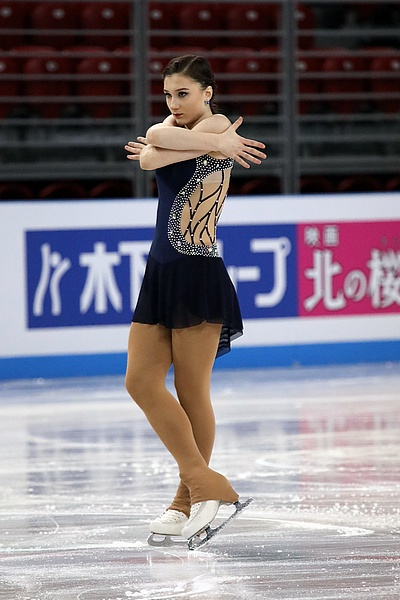
Olga Mikutina of Austria and Kristina Lisovskaja of Estonia: the gold and silver medalists in the women's event at the 2025 Lõunakeskus Trophy.

=== Men's singles ===
Senior men's event medalists
Season	Gold	Silver	Bronze	Ref.
No senior men's competitors prior to 2015
2015–16	(Estonia) Samuel Koppel	No other competitors		
2016–20	No men's competitors			
2020–21	No competition held			
2021–22	No men's competitors			
2022–23	(Estonia) Aleksandr Selevko	No other competitors		
2023–24	(Estonia) Aleksandr Selevko	No other competitors		
2024–25	(Finland) Jan Ollikainen	(Finland) Jaroslav Krestyannikov	(Republic of Ireland) Dillon Judge	
2025–26	(Estonia) Arlet Levandi	(Finland) Arttu Juusola	(France) Ian Vauclin	

=== Women's singles ===
Senior women's event medalists
Season	Gold	Silver	Bronze	Ref.
No senior women's competitors prior to 2015
2015–16	(Latvia) Ieva Gaile	(Estonia) Sindra Kriisa	(Estonia) Alesja Doborovits	
2016–17	(Estonia) Sindra Kriisa	(Estonia) Dzoana Pajus	No other competitors	
2017–18	(Estonia) Alicia Tsingisser	No other competitors		
2018–19	(Finland) Milla-Marjaana Ihalainen	(Estonia) Hanna Kristella Lehtsaar	(Finland) Selma Mönkäre	
2019–20	(Estonia) Katerina Griskun	(Estonia) Hanna Kristella Lehtsaar	No other competitors	
2020–21	No competition held			
2021–22	(Estonia) Nataly Langerbaur	No other competitors		
2022–23	(Latvia) Sofja Stepčenko	(Estonia) Elizaveta Davydova	(Estonia) Martaliis Kuslap	
2023–24	(Estonia) Kristina Lisovskaja	(Lithuania) Aleksandra Golovkina	(Estonia) Karoliine Raudsepp	
2024–25	(Finland) Linnea Ceder	(Finland) Minja Peltonen	(Czech Republic) Michaela Vraštáková	
2025–26	(Austria) Olga Mikutina	(Estonia) Kristina Lisovskaja	(Finland) Minja Peltonen	

== Junior medalists ==
=== Men's singles ===
Junior men's event medalists
Season	Gold	Silver	Bronze	Ref.
2012–13	No junior men's competitors			
2013–14	(Georgia (country)) Armen Agaian	(Belarus) Artsiom Tseluiko	(Lithuania) Laurynas Vonzodas	
2014–15	No junior men's competitors			
2015–16	(Estonia) Daniel Albert Naurits	No other competitors		
2016–17	No junior men's competitors			
2017–18	(Estonia) Ivan Mikhaylov	No other competitors		
2018–20	No junior men's competitors			
2020–21	No competition held			
2021–22	(Estonia) Jegor Martsenko	(Latvia) Daniels Kockers	No other competitors	
2022–23	No junior men's competitors			
2023–24	(Estonia) Jegor Martsenko	No other competitors		
2024–25	(Estonia) Vladislav Churakov	(Estonia) Jegor Martsenko	(Armenia) Konstantin Smirnov	
2025–26	(Estonia) Vladislav Churakov	(Finland) Romulus Peltonen	(Latvia) Akims Kirilovs	

=== Women's singles ===
Junior women's event medalists
Season	Gold	Silver	Bronze	Ref.
2012–13	(Estonia) Sindra Kriisa	(Latvia) Samanta Kovalkova	(Latvia) Elizabete Pujate	
2013–14	(Russia) Ksenia Kochueva	(Estonia) Sindra Kriisa	(Belarus) Yelizaveta Ausiukevich	
2014–15	(Estonia) Sindra Kriisa	(Estonia) Alicia Tsingisser	(Finland) Katjaana Kanninen	
2015–16	(Latvia) Elizabete Jubkane	(Lithuania) Greta Morkytė	(Estonia) Linda Lukas	
2016–17	(Estonia) Annely Vahi	(Estonia) Calista Krass	(Estonia) Kerli Illipe	
2017–18	(Estonia) Niina Petrõkina	(Estonia) Jekaterina Rudneva	(Estonia) Nataly Langerbaur	
2018–19	(Estonia) Niina Petrõkina	(Estonia) Mariia Bolsheva	(Estonia) Nataly Langerbaur	
2019–20	(Estonia) Karoliine Raudsepp	(Finland) Emma Karjalainen	(Estonia) Eliise Alop	
2020–21	No competition held			
2021–22	(Estonia) Marianne Must	(Estonia) Sandra-Liisa Jermonok	(Estonia) Karoliine Raudsepp	
2022–23	(Estonia) Sofia Guljakina	(Finland) Lumia Sassi	(Estonia) Polina Kurotskina	
2023–24	(Estonia) Elina Goidina	(Latvia) Kira Baranovska	(Finland) Darja Trubitson	
2024–25	(Switzerland) Leandra Tzimpoukakis	(Switzerland) Elisabeth Dibbern	(Estonia) Maria Eliise Kaljuvere	
2025–26	(Estonia) Elina Goidina	(Estonia) Sofia Nekrassova	(Finland) Annika Pellonmaa	

== Cumulative medal count ==
=== Total medals ===
Total number of Lõunakeskus Trophy medals by nation
Rank	Nation	Gold	Silver	Bronze	Total
1	Estonia	9	6	3	18
2	Finland	3	3	2	8
3	Latvia	2	0	0	2
4	Austria	1	0	0	1
5	Lithuania	0	1	0	1
6	Czech Republic	0	0	1	1
6	France	0	0	1	1
6	Ireland	0	0	1	1
Totals (8 entries)		15	10	8	33
