= Clara Peters =

Irish figure skater (born 1991)

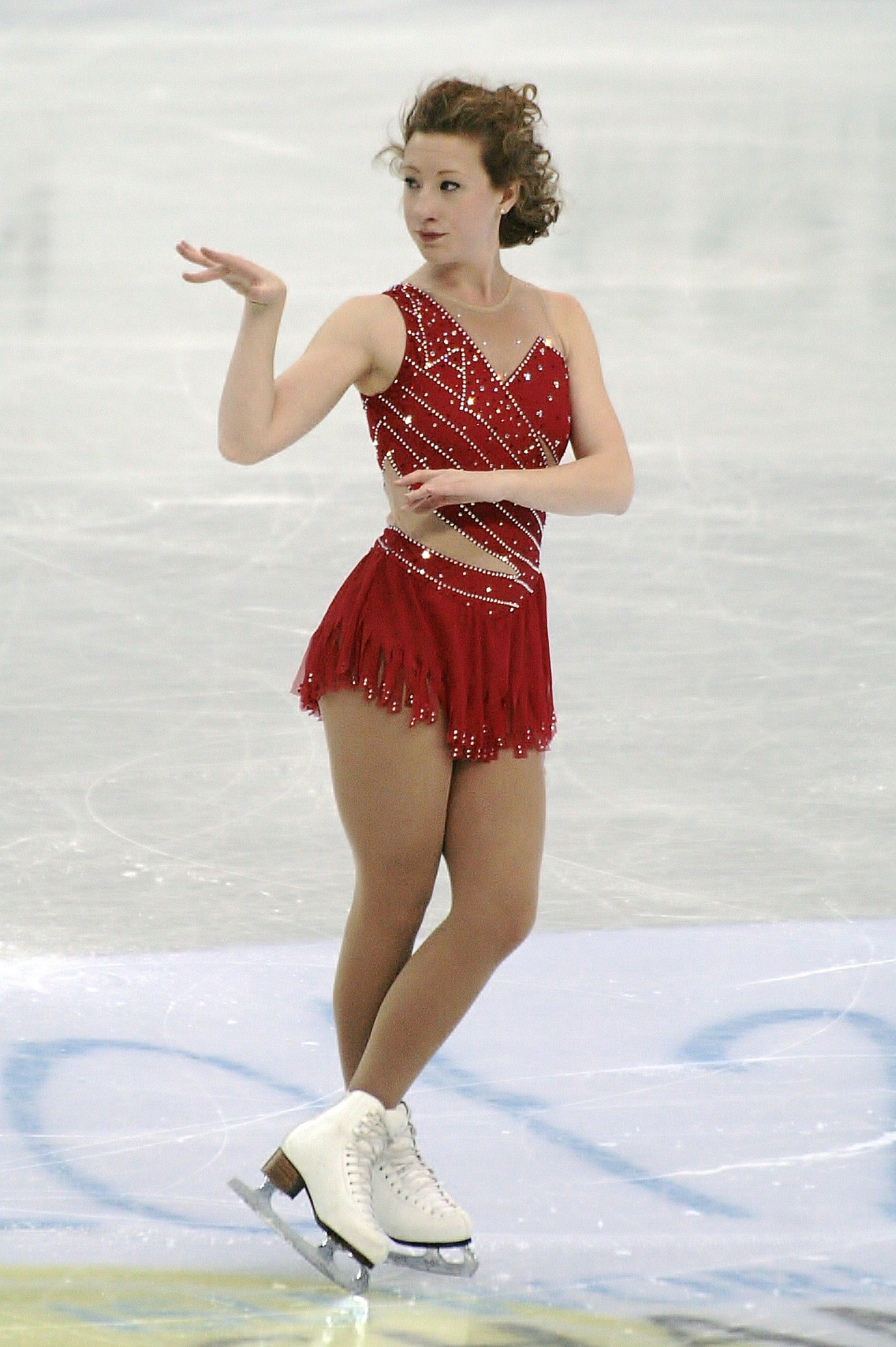
- Peters at the 2012 World Championships

Personal information
- Born: 19 July 1991 (age 34) Essen, Germany
- Home town: Dublin, Ireland
- Height: 1.59 m (5 ft 3 in)

Figure skating career
- Country: Ireland
- Coach: Karen Ludington, Jeff DiGregorio
- Skating club: Dundalk Ice Skating Club
- Began skating: 1999

Clara Peters (born 19 July 1991) is an Irish figure skater. She is the first figure skater to represent Ireland in ISU competition.

== Personal life ==
Peters was born in Germany because her parents were working there at the time. She moved to Ireland when she was 18 months old and was raised in Dublin.

== Career ==
Peters began skating in Dublin around the age of seven. After her rink closed in 2000, she travelled two and a half hours to one in Belfast, Northern Ireland. In January 2006, Peters moved to Florida to be coached by Kerry Leitch. After Leitch retired in 2008, she moved to Delaware to train with Ronald Ludington and his wife Karen. The Republic of Ireland has no permanent rink.

Peters initially competed in domestic events in Great Britain, placing ninth at the 2007 British novice championships. She began competing internationally for Ireland beginning in the 2008–09 season, when Ireland became a provisional member of the International Skating Union.

Peters placed 38th at the 2009 European Championships. At the event, she became the first skater to represent Ireland at an ISU Championships. Peters placed 52nd at the 2009 World Championships, and 47th at the 2010 World Championships. She improved to 27th at the 2011 Europeans, but did not advance beyond the preliminary round at the 2011 World Championships. In 2012, Peters finished 28th at her fourth Europeans and improved significantly upon her past results by coming in 29th at Worlds; Peters stated that qualifying for the short program was "a huge deal" and meant that all her hard work had paid off.

== Programs ==
Season	Short program	Free skating
2015–16	The King's Speech by Alexandre Desplat	Blood Diamond by James Newton Howard
2014–15	unknown	Downton Abbey by John Lunn
2013–14	Life Is Beautiful by Nicola Piovani	Downton Abbey by John Lunn
2012–13	La Vie en rose by Marguerite Monnot	Moonlight Sonata by Ludwig van Beethoven
2011–12	The Notebook by Aaron Zigman	Rhapsody on a Theme of Paganini by Sergei Rachmaninoff
2010–11	The Giving by Michael W. Smith	Rhapsody on a Theme of Paganini by Sergei Rachmaninoff
2009–10	The Last Rose of Summer by Erich Künzel, Timothy Lees	Battle of the Smithsonian by Alan Silvestri; Madagascar by James Dooley
2008–09	O mio babbino caro (from Gianni Schicchi) by Giacomo Puccini performed by Joshua Bell	Fantasia 2000

== Results ==
JGP: Junior Grand Prix

International
Event	08–09	09–10	10–11	11–12	12–13	13–14	14–15	15–16
Worlds	52nd	47th	21st P	29th				
Europeans	38th	36th	27th	28th				
Crystal Skate						10th		
Cup of Nice			22nd	22nd	28th			
DS Cup					8th	10th		
Challenge Cup					20th			
FBMA Trophy							3rd	
Istanbul Cup				9th				
Merano Cup	19th		24th					
Nebelhorn		32nd		19th		33rd		
Printemps								11th
Seibt Memorial							29th	
Skate Down Under						3rd		
Toruń Cup						7th		
Triglav Trophy					9th	12th		
Ukrainian Open						6th		
US Classic					14th	12th		
International: Junior
JGP Czech Rep.	31st							
JGP Spain	33rd							
National
Irish Champ.	1st	1st		1st	1st	1st	1st	
P = Preliminary round
