= Linnea Ceder =

Finnish figure skater (born 2002)

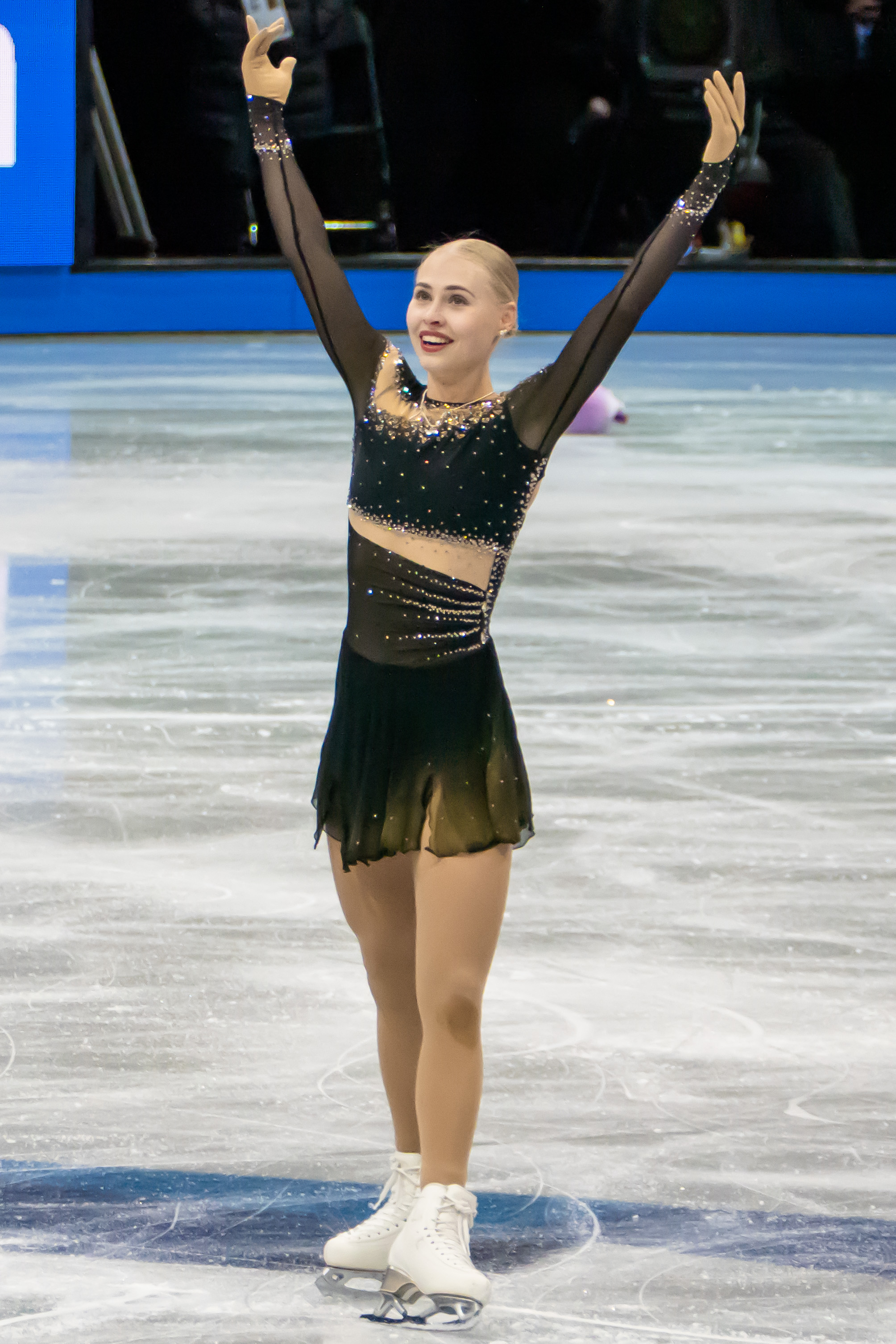
- Ceder at the 2025 World Championships

Personal information
- Born: 8 August 2002 (age 24) Tuusula, Finland
- Home town: Kerava, Finland
- Height: 1.62 m (5 ft 4 in)

Figure skating career
- Country: Finland
- Coach: Virpi Horttana
- Skating club: Espoo FSC
- Began skating: 2006
- Retired: April 2, 2026

Medal record
Finnish Championships
Silver medal – second place	2022 Pori	Singles
Silver medal – second place	2025 Rauma	Singles
Bronze medal – third place	2020 Vantaa	Singles
Bronze medal – third place	2026 Lahti	Singles

Linnea Ceder (born 8 August 2002) is a Finnish retired figure skater. She is the 2022 and 2025 Finnish national silver medalist.

== Personal life ==
Ceder was born on August 8, 2002, in Tuusula, Finland, to parents, Mia and Ikka. She has two younger siblings, Linus and Elle.

Ceder's sister, Elle, is a middle-distance runner who competed in the semi-finals at the 2024 World Athletics U20 Championships in the women's 800 metre event.

== Career ==
=== Early years ===
Ceder began figure skating in 2006. Her first coaches included Lumiki Maki, Pia Parvainen, and Kim Jacobson. In 2016, she joined the Espoo Figure Skating Club where Virpi Horttana became her coach.

On the novice level, she finished fifth at the 2016 Nordic Championships.

=== 2016–17 season ===
Making her junior international debut, Ceder finished eighth at the 2016 Lombardia Trophy. She then went on to win the bronze medal at the 2017 Finnish Junior Championships before placing fourth on the junior level at the 2017 Mentor Toruń Cup.

Ceder finished the season by winning the gold medal at the 2017 Nordic Junior Championships.

=== 2017–18 season ===
Ceder began the season by debuting on the Junior Grand Prix series, finishing fifteenth at 2017 JGP Belarus. She then went on to win the silver medal on the junior level at the 2017 Tirnavia Ice Cup and placing thirteenth on the junior level at the 2017 Tallinn Trophy.

In December, Ceder finished sixth at the 2018 Finnish Junior Championships. She subsequently closed the season by placing eighth on the junior level at the 2018 International Challenge Cup and winning the bronze medal on the junior level at the 2018 Coupe du Printemps.

=== 2018–19 season ===
Ceder started the season by competing on the junior level at the 2018 Tallinn Trophy, where she placed sixth. She then made her senior national debut at the 2019 Finnish Championships, finishing fifth. Ceder followed this up by winning bronze on the senior level at the 2019 Mentor Toruń Cup.

Selected to compete at the 2019 European Youth Olympic Winter Festival in Sarajevo, Bosnia and Herzegovina, Ceder finished the event in tenth place. She then went on to compete at the 2019 World Junior Championships in Zagreb, Croatia. She placed twenty-ninth in the short program and did not advance to the free skate segment.

=== 2019–20 season ===
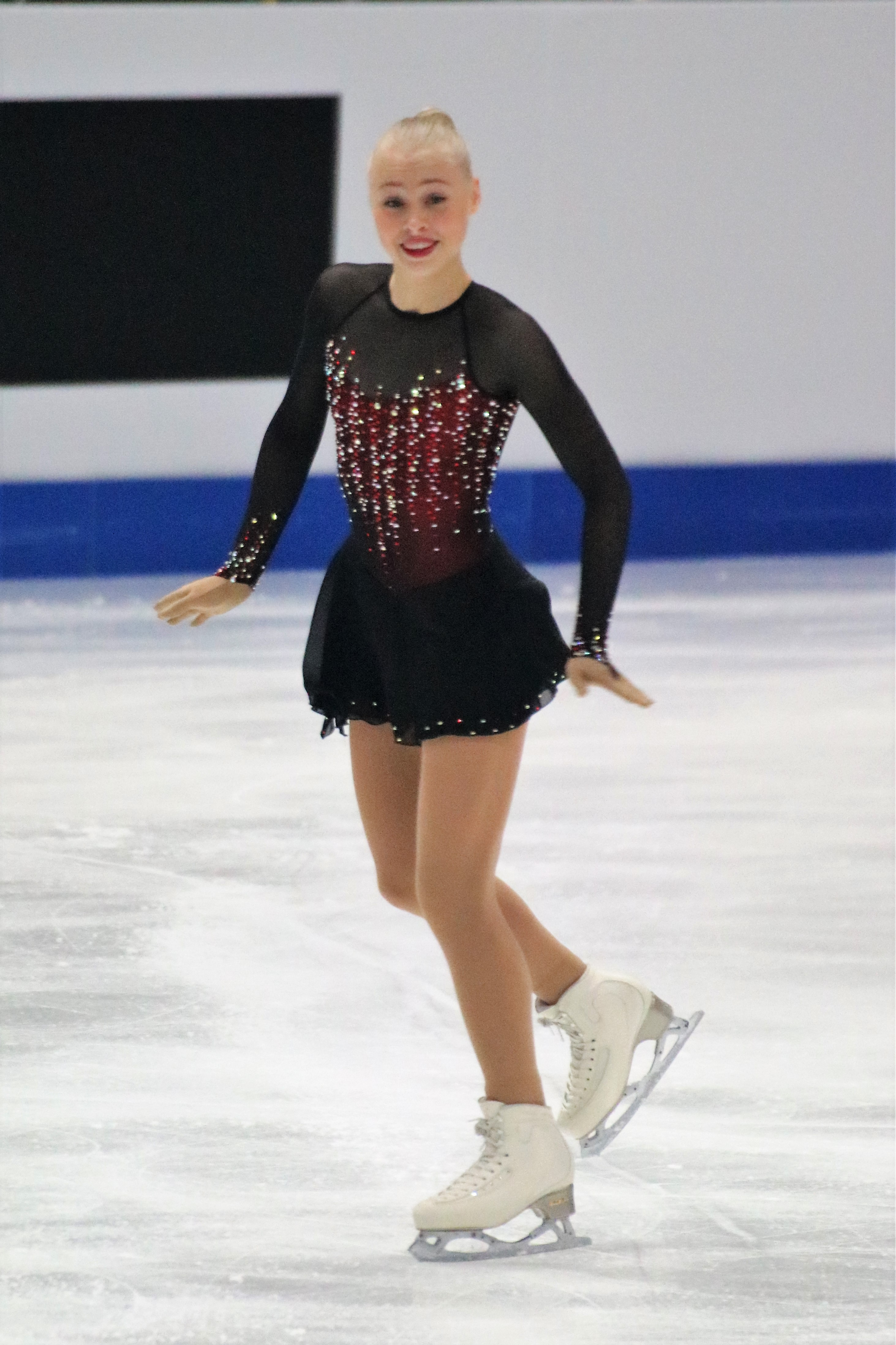
Ceder at the 2020 European Championships

Ceder began the season by competing on the 2019–20 ISU Junior Grand Prix series, placing eighth at 2019 JGP Russia. She then competed on the senior level, placing seventh at the 2019 CS Finlandia Trophy, winning the bronze medal at the 2019 Halloween Cup, and placing sixth at the 2019 Tallinn Trophy.

In December, she won the bronze medal at the 2020 Finnish Championships. Selected to compete at the 2020 European Championships in Graz, Austria, Ceder finished the event in twelfth place.

=== 2020–21 season ===
Ceder did not compete during this season.

=== 2021–22 season ===
Over the summer, Ceder struggled with a leg injury from changing skates, which ultimately kept her off the ice for three months. She started the season by competing at the 2021 CS Finlandia Trophy but withdrew following the short program. Ceder then went on to compete at the 2021 Trophée Métropole Nice Côte d'Azur and the 2021 CS Cup of Austria, finishing eighth and nineteenth, respectively.

In December, she competed at the 2022 Finnish Championships, winning the silver medal behind Jenni Saarinen. She subsequently won the bronze medal at the 2022 Bavarian Open before finishing fourth at the 2022 Nordic Championships and at the 2022 Jégvirág Cup.

Selected to compete at the 2022 World Junior Championships in Tallinn, Estonia, where she placed twelfth.

=== 2022–23 season ===
Ceder began the season by competing on the 2022–23 ISU Challenger Series, placing tenth at the 2022 CS Nebelhorn Trophy and eleventh at the 2022 CS Finlandia Trophy. She went on to compete at the 2022 Volvo Open Cup but withdrew following the short program.

Due to the Russian invasion of Ukraine, Russia's annually held Grand Prix event, the Rostelecom Cup, was cancelled and replaced with the Grand Prix of Finland for an indefinite period. As a result, Ceder was selected as one of the nation's host representatives to compete at the 2022 Grand Prix of Espoo. She ultimately finished the event in eleventh place.

Due to sustaining a stress fracture in her lower back, Ceder missed the remaining season.

=== 2023–24 season ===
Returning from injury, Ceder started the season by competing at the 2023 Swiss Open, where she finished in fourth place. She then went on to place seventeenth at the 2023 CS Warsaw Cup and fifth at the 2023 Tallinn Trophy.

In December, Ceder competed at the 2024 Finnish Championships, where she placed sixth. She subsequently finished the season by finishing sixth at the 2024 Volvo Open Cup and winning bronze at the 2024 Sonja Henie Trophy.

=== 2024–25 season ===
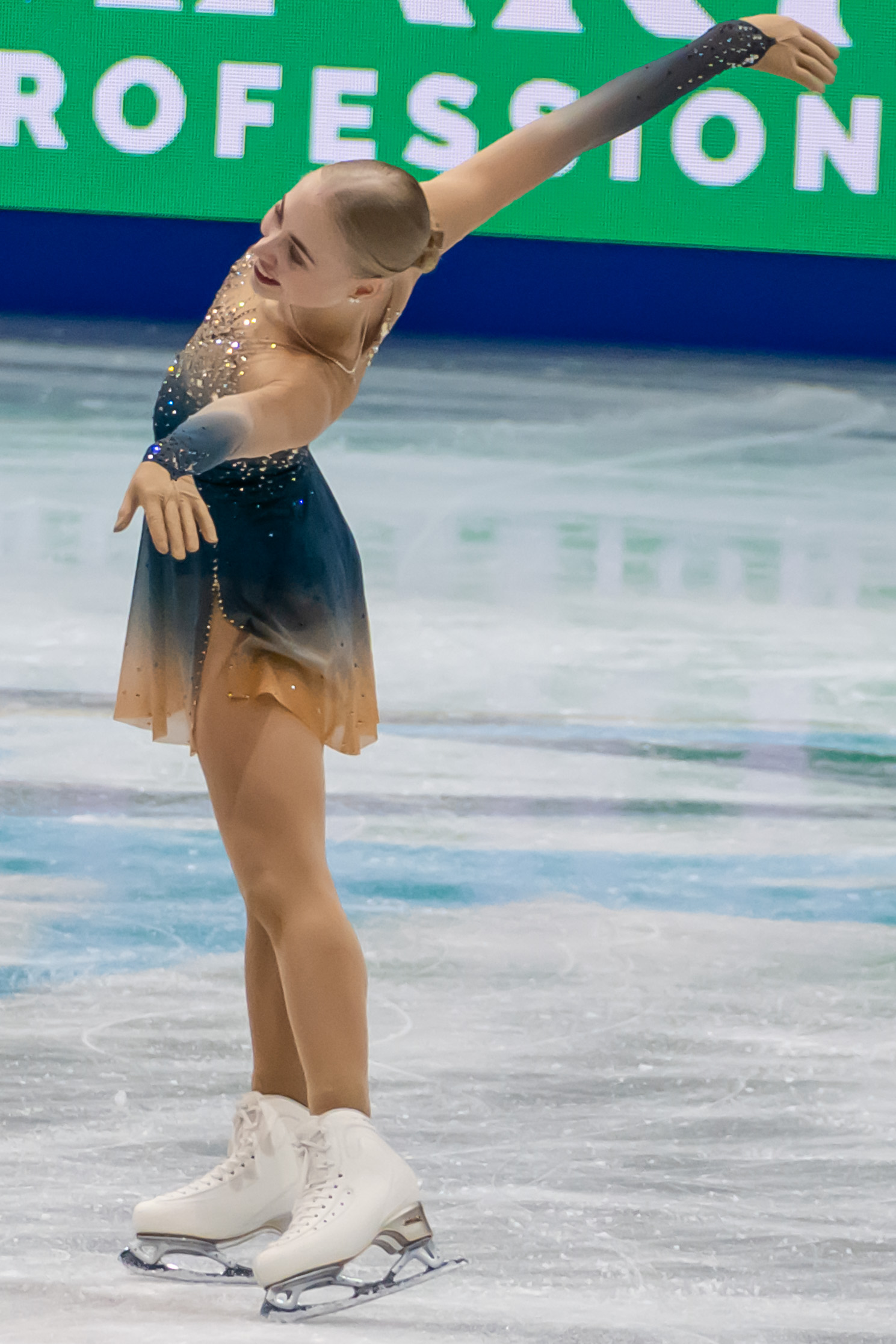
Ceder at the 2025 World Championships

Ceder began the season by competing on the 2024–25 Challenger Series, finishing eighth at the 2024 CS Nepela Memorial and fourth at the 2024 CS Tallinn Trophy. She then went on to win the gold medal at the 2024 Lounakeskus Trophy.

In December, she won the silver medal at the 2025 Finnish Championships behind Olivia Lisko.

Selected to compete at the 2025 European Championships in Tallinn, Estonia, Ceder finished the event in fifteenth place. She then competed at the 2025 Nordic Championships and the 2025 Bellu Memorial, winning silver and gold, respectively.

Ceder subsequently finished the season by debuting at the World Championships in Boston, Massachusetts, United States, finishing in eighteenth place overall. With this placement, Ceder won Finland a quota for women's singles skating at the 2026 Winter Olympics. In an interview following the free skate, Ceder shared, "Even though I was, of course, so happy after making the final and qualifying the spot for my country, the nerves were still there. But I'm fairly happy with what I showed today. There were a few things here and there, but overall, I think I did pretty good. The reactions after the short program, after I secured the Olympic spot, were really great, people were so happy. Next year, there will be tight competition for that spot in Finland because we have a lot of strong girls. But I’m ready to do my best and fight."

=== 2025–26 season ===
Ceder opened her season by finishing tenth at the 2025 CS Lombardia Trophy. She followed this up by winning gold at the 2025 Crystal Skate Open. In October, Ceder placed ninth at the 2025 CS Trialeti Trophy and finished seventh at the 2025 Swiss Open.

In December, she won the bronze medal at the 2026 Finnish Championships behind Iida Karhunen and Olivia Lisko.

On April 2, 2026, Ceder announced her retirement from competitive figure skating.

== Programs ==
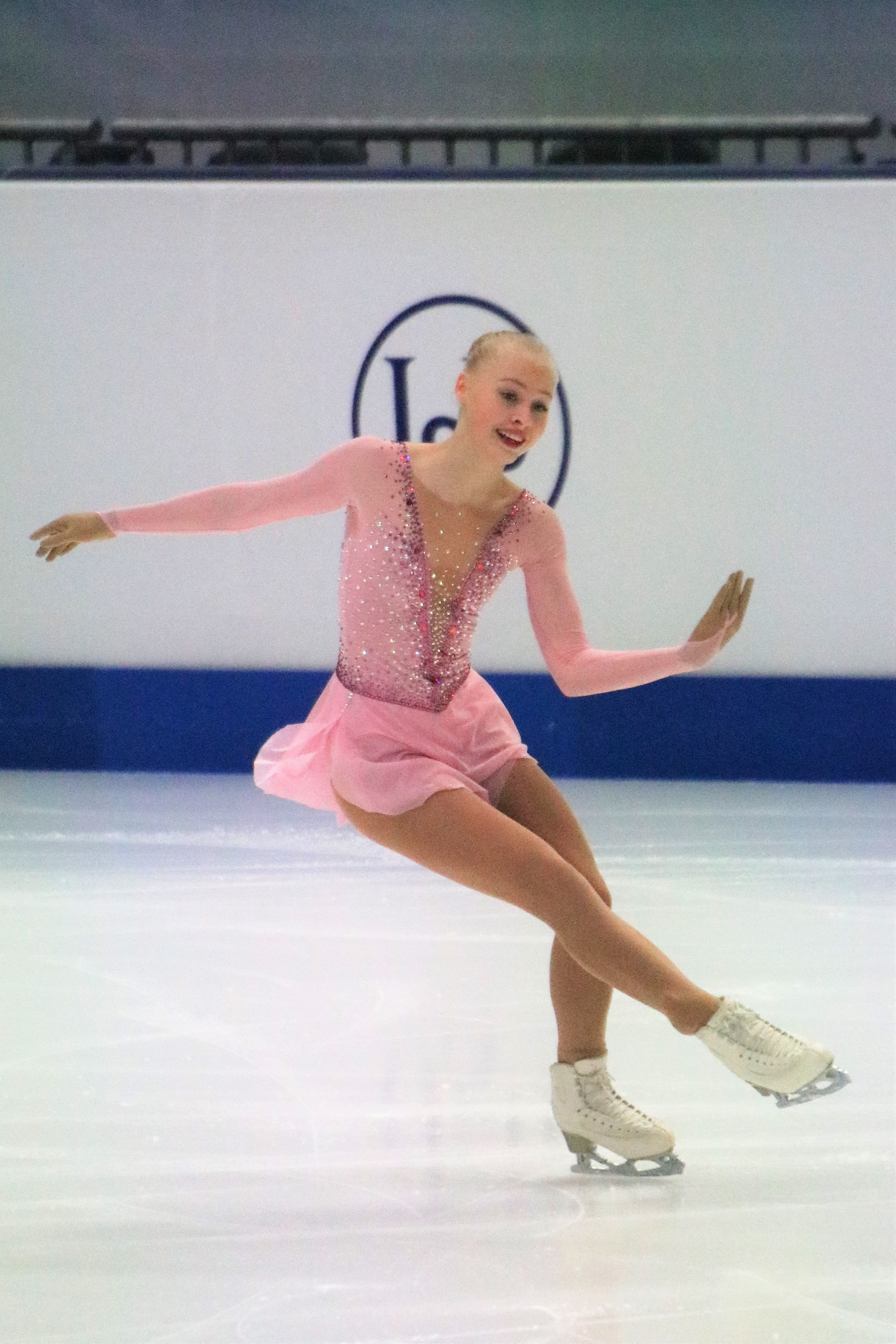
Ceder at the 2020 European Championships

Season	Short program	Free program	Exhibition
2025–2026	The Lonely Shepherd by Stjepan Hauser & London Symphony Orchestra choreo. by Shanetta Folle	Chasing Cars by Snow Patrol performed by Tommee Profitt & Fleurie choreo. by Mark Pillay	
2024–2025	Because of You by Jennifer Thomas choreo. by Shanetta Folle	Wake Me Up by Avicii performed by Tommee Profitt & Fleurie arranged by Hugo Chouinard & Karl Hugo choreo. by Mark Pillay	
2023–2024	Because of You by Jennifer Thomas choreo. by Shanetta Folle	Exogenesis: Symphony Part 3 by Muse choreo. by Shanetta Folle	
2022–23	Because of You by Jennifer Thomas choreo. by Shanetta Folle	Broken Vow by Lara Fabian choreo. by Adam Solya	Toxic by Britney Spears performed by 2WEI choreo. by Shanetta Folle
2021–22	Toxic by Britney Spears performed by 2WEI choreo. by Shanetta Folle	Broken Vow by Lara Fabian choreo. by Adam Solya	
2018–21	Cinema Paradiso by Ennio Morricone choreo. by Nelli Hagman, Sari Hakola	Juliet; The Death of Mercutio and Tybalt; A Time for Us (from Romeo and Juliet) by Nino Rota performed by Celtic Woman choreo. by Nelli Hagman, Sari Hakola	
2017–18	Once Upon a December (from Anastasia) performed by Liz Callaway choreo. by Nelli Hagman, Sari Hakola	People Help the People by Cherry Ghost performed by Simon John Aldred choreo. by Nelli Hagman, Sari Hakola	

== Competitive highlights ==
- GP – Event of the ISU Grand Prix Series
- JGP – Event of the ISU Junior Grand Prix Series
- CS – Event of the ISU Challenger Series
- TBD – Assigned
- WD – Withdrew from event
- C – Event was cancelled

Competition placements at senior level
Season	2018–19	2019–20	2020–21	2021–22	2022–23	2023–24	2024–25	2025–26
World Championships							18th	
European Championships		12th					15th	
Finnish Championships	5th	3rd	C	2nd		6th	2nd	3rd
GP Finland					11th			
CS Cup of Austria				19th				
CS Finlandia Trophy		7th		WD	11th			
CS Lombardia Trophy								10th
CS Nebelhorn Trophy					10th			
CS Nepela Memorial							8th	
CS Tallinn Trophy		6th				5th	4th	
CS Trialeti Trophy								13th
CS Warsaw Cup						17th		
Bavarian Open				3rd				
Bellu Memorial							1st	
Crystal Skate Open								1st
Cup of Nice				8th				
Halloween Cup		3rd						
Jégvirág Cup				4th				
Lõunakeskus Trophy							1st	
Mentor Toruń Cup	3rd							
Nordics				4th			2nd	
Sonja Henie Trophy						3rd		
Swiss Open						4th		
Volvo Open Cup					WD	6th		

Competition placements at junior level
Season	2016–17	2017–18	2018–19	2019–20	2021–22
World Junior Championships			29th		12th
Finnish Championships	3rd	6th			
JGP Belarus		15th			
JGP Russia				8th	
Coupe du Printemps		3rd			
EYEOF			10th		
Tallinn Trophy			6th		

== Detailed results ==
ISU personal best scores in the +5/-5 GOE System
Segment	Type	Score	Event
Total	TSS	166.16	2020 European Championships
Short program	TSS	58.01	2020 European Championships
Short program	TES	33.04	2020 European Championships
Short program	PCS	27.98	2022 CS Finlandia Trophy
Free skating	TSS	109.92	2024 CS Tallinn Trophy
Free skating	TES	57.06	2024 CS Tallinn Trophy
Free skating	PCS	54.53	2022 CS Finlandia Trophy

=== Senior results ===
Results in the 2025–26 season
Date	Event	SP		FS		Total	
Date	Event	P	Score	P	Score	P	Score
Sep 11–14, 2025	(Italy) 2025 CS Lombardia Trophy	9	57.22	10	100.02	10	157.24
Sep 25–28, 2025	(Estonia) 2025 Crystal Skate Open	1	63.60	2	103.05	1	166.65
Oct 8–11, 2025	(Georgia (country)) 2025 CS Trialeti Trophy	8	54.82	10	107.13	9	161.95
Dec 12–14, 2025	(Finland) 2026 Finnish Championships	4	56.09	3	97.00	3	153.09

2024–25 season
Date	Event	SP	FS	Total
March 25–30, 2025	2025 World Championships	20; 56.79	17; 108.71	18; 165.50
February 18–23, 2025	2025 Bellu Memorial	3; 56.25	1; 120.41	1; 176.66
January 28 – February 2, 2025	2025 European Championships	11; 54.82	16; 101.19	15; 156.01
December 13–15, 2024	2025 Finnish Championships	2; 61.73	2; 99.98	2; 161.71
November 28–December 1, 2024	2024 Lõunakeskus Trophy	2; 51.06	1; 105.00	1; 156.06
November 11–17, 2024	2024 CS Tallinn Trophy	4; 53.49	3; 109.92	4; 163.41
October 24–26, 2024	2024 CS Nepela Memorial	5; 54.60	10; 90.41	8; 145.01
2023–24 season
Date	Event	SP	FS	Total
March 8-10, 2024	2024 Sonja Henje Trophy	5; 48.70	3; 96.70	3; 145.40
January 18-21, 2024	2024 Volvo Open Cup	2; 50.20	6; 77.67	6; 127.87
December 15-17, 2023	2024 Finnish Championships	5; 53.04	6; 93.97	6; 147.01
November 21-24, 2023	2023 Tallinn Trophy	5; 56.89	5; 99.02	5; 155.91
November 16-19, 2023	2023 CS Warsaw Cup	16; 50.63	18; 84.85	17; 135.48
October 26-29, 2023	2023 Swiss Ice Skating Open	4; 48.84	4; 89.25	4; 138.09
2022–23 season
Date	Event	SP	FS	Total
November 25–27, 2022	2022 Grand Prix of Espoo	10; 55.63	10; 96.28	11; 151.91
October 4–9, 2022	2022 CS Finlandia Trophy	9; 56.19	12; 99.76	11; 155.95
September 21–24, 2022	2022 CS Nebelhorn Trophy	5; 57.43	11; 95.38	10; 152.81
2021–22 season
Date	Event	SP	FS	Total
December 17–19, 2022	2022 Finnish Championships	2; 57.52	1; 113.65	2; 171.17
November 11–14, 2021	2021 CS Cup of Austria	23; 45.64	18; 90.74	19; 136.38
October 20–24, 2021	2021 Cup of Nice	11; 40.49	8; 94.20	8; 134.69
October 7–10, 2021	2021 CS Finlandia Trophy	24; 44.72	WD	WD
2019–20 season
Date	Event	SP	FS	Total
January 20–26, 2020	2020 European Championships	15; 58.01	12; 108.15	12; 166.16
December 14–16, 2019	2020 Finnish Championships	5; 50.38	3; 110.49	3; 160.87
November 11–17, 2019	2019 Tallinn Trophy	3; 54.85	10; 93.13	6; 147.98
October 17–20, 2019	2019 Halloween Cup	2; 53.77	4; 94.50	3; 148.27
October 11–13, 2019	2019 CS Finlandia Trophy	7; 53.25	8; 98.23	7; 151.48

=== Junior ===
2021–22 season
Date	Event	SP	FS	Total
April 13–17, 2022	2022 World Junior Championships	13; 56.34	12; 104.92	12; 161.26
2019–20 season
Date	Event	SP	FS	Total
September 11–14, 2019	2019 JGP Russia	12; 49.91	10; 95.75	8; 145.66
