= Dillon Judge =

Irish figure skater

Personal information
- Born: 22 March 2004 (age 22) Lisburn, Northern Ireland
- Home town: Doncaster, England
- Height: 1.72 m (5 ft 7 1/2 in)

Figure skating career
- Country: Ireland
- Discipline: Men's singles
- Coach: Barbara Luoni
- Skating club: City of Dublin Irish Skating Club
- Began skating: 2014

Medal record
Irish Championships
Gold medal – first place	2023 Dundee	Singles
Gold medal – first place	2025 Dundee	Singles

Dillon Judge (born 22 March 2004) is a British-Irish figure skater who represents Ireland. He is the 2024 Triglav Trophy bronze medalist, the 2024 Lõunakeskus Trophy bronze medalist, and a two-time Irish national champion (2023, 2025).

On the junior level, he is the 2021 Tayside Trophy silver medalist, the 2022 Kurbada Cup bronze medalist, and the 2020 Irish junior national champion.

== Competitive highlights ==
- JGP – Event of the ISU Junior Grand Prix Series

Competition placements at senior level
Season	2022–23	2023–24	2024–25	2025–26	2026–27
Irish Championships	1st		1st		
CS Golden Spin of Zagreb		14th		22nd	
CS Lombardia Trophy					10th
CS Nebelhorn Trophy					14th
Challenge Cup		9th			
Bosphorus Cup				7th	
Cup of Innsbruck				8th	
Denkova-Staviski Cup			11th		12th
Dragon Trophy		7th		3rd	
EduSport Trophy			5th		
Merano Ice Trophy			14th		
Lõunakeskus Trophy			3rd		
Road to 26 Trophy			12th		
Skate Berlin				11th	
Skate to Milano				24th	
Sonja Henie Trophy		4th			
Tayside Trophy		16th		11th	
Tirnavia Ice Cup					10th
Triglav Trophy		3rd			
Volvo Open Cup		7th			

Competition placements at junior level
Season	2019–20	2021–22	2022–23
Irish Championships	1st		
JGP Austria		22nd	
JGP France			19th
JGP Poland			26th
JGP Slovakia		21st	
Challenge Cup			10th
Kurbada Cup		3rd	
NRW Trophy			11th
Santa Claus Cup		11th	
Tayside Trophy		2nd	5th

== Detailed results ==
ISU personal best scores in the +5/-5 GOE System
Segment	Type	Score	Event
Total	TSS	133.73	2025 Skate to Milano
Short program	TSS	50.20	2025 Skate to Milano
Short program	TES	25.74	2025 Skate to Milano
Short program	PCS	25.21	2023 CS Golden Spin of Zagreb
Free skating	TSS	85.39	2026 CS Nebelhorn Trophy
Free skating	TES	43.54	2025 Skate to Milano
Free skating	PCS	47.95	2026 CS Nebelhorn Trophy

=== Senior level ===
Results in the 2022–23 season
Date	Event	SP		FS		Total	
Date	Event	P	Score	P	Score	P	Score
Jun 17–18, 2023	(Republic of Ireland) 2023 Irish Championships	1	36.04	1	71.83	1	107.87

Results in the 2023–24 season
Date	Event	SP		FS		Total	
Date	Event	P	Score	P	Score	P	Score
Oct 14–15, 2023	(United Kingdom) 2023 Tayside Trophy	15	43.30	16	84.30	16	127.60
Nov 7–12, 2023	(Bulgaria) 2023 Denkova-Staviski Cup	11	42.85	9	95.58	10	138.43
Dec 6–9, 2023	(Croatia) 2023 CS Golden Spin of Zagreb	14	44.93	14	71.11	14	116.04
Jan 18–21, 2024	(Latvia) 2024 Volvo Open Cup	7	49.25	7	77.61	7	126.86
Feb 8–11, 2024	(Slovenia) 2024 Dragon Trophy	8	48.09	7	90.39	7	138.48
Feb 22–25, 2024	(Netherlands) 2024 International Challenge Cup	9	47.34	9	79.63	9	126.97
Mar 8–10, 2024	(Norway) 2024 Sonja Henie Trophy	4	37.29	3	90.32	4	127.61
Apr 10–14, 2024	(Slovenia) 2024 Triglav Trophy	3	52.55	3	82.51	3	135.06

Results in the 2024-25 season
Date	Event	SP		FS		Total	
Date	Event	P	Score	P	Score	P	Score
Nov 5-10, 2024	(Bulgaria) 2024 Denkova-Staviski Cup	10	52.66	11	99.07	11	151.73
Nov 28 - Dec 1, 2024	(Estonia) 2024 Lõunakeskus Trophy	3	40.79	3	69.24	3	110.03
Dec 10-15, 2024	(Romania) 2024 EduSport Trophy	4	49.08	5	80.81	5	129.89
Feb 14-16, 2025	(Italy) 2025 Merano Ice Trophy	15	40.50	14	85.44	14	125.94
Feb 18–20, 2025	(Italy) Road to 26 Trophy	12	46.37	12	79.98	12	126.35

Results in the 2025-26 season
Date	Event	SP		FS		Total	
Date	Event	P	Score	P	Score	P	Score
Sep 18-21, 2025	(China) 2025 ISU Skate to Milano	24	50.20	24	83.53	24	133.73
Oct 11-12, 2025	(United Kingdom) 2025 Tayside Trophy	11	37.27	11	74.16	11	111.43
Nov 13-16, 2025	(Austria) 2025 Cup of Innsbruck	7	41.45	8	78.68	8	120.13
Nov 24-30, 2025	(Turkey) 2025 Bosphorus Cup	8	45.29	7	63.11	7	108.40
Dec 3–6, 2025	(Croatia) 2025 CS Golden Spin of Zagreb	22	47.91	22	80.40	22	128.31
Jan 23-25, 2026	(Slovenia) 2026 Dragon Trophy	2	56.69	3	94.83	3	151.52
Feb 17-21, 2026	(Germany) 2026 Skate Berlin International	12	40.65	11	90.38	11	131.03

Results in the 2026–27 season
Date	Event	SP		FS		Total	
Date	Event	P	Score	P	Score	P	Score
Sep 17–20, 2026	(Italy) 2026 CS Lombardia Trophy	10	43.50	10	77.09	10	120.59
Sep 24–26, 2026	(Germany) 2026 CS Nebelhorn Trophy	14	46.12	13	85.39	14	131.51
Nov 6–8, 2026	(Bulgaria) 2026 Denkova-Staviski Cup	12	48.31	12	85.90	12	134.21
Oct 30 – Nov 1, 2026	(Slovakia) 2026 Tirnavia Ice Cup	10	42.94	10	86.45	10	129.39

=== Junior level ===
Results in the 2019–20 season
Date	Event	SP		FS		Total	
Date	Event	P	Score	P	Score	P	Score
Feb 24–25, 2020	(Republic of Ireland) 2020 Irish Championships	1	26.47	1	54.21	1	80.68

Results in the 2021–22 season
Date	Event	SP		FS		Total	
Date	Event	P	Score	P	Score	P	Score
Sep 1–4, 2021	2021 JGP Slovakia	22	34.52	21	62.99	21	97.51
Oct 6–9, 2021	2021 JGP Austria	22	32.75	23	59.73	22	92.48
Nov 6–7, 2021	(United Kingdom) 2021 Tayside Trophy	2	38.81	2	57.87	2	96.68
Dec 6–12, 2021	(Hungary) 2021 Santa Claus Cup	11	38.55	11	70.23	11	108.78
Apr 8–10, 2022	(Latvia) 2022 Kurbada Cup	4	36.22	3	73.56	3	109.78

Results in the 2022–23 season
Date	Event	SP		FS		Total	
Date	Event	P	Score	P	Score	P	Score
Aug 24–27, 2022	2022 JGP France	19	35.10	20	48.43	19	83.53
Sep 28 – Oct 1, 2022	2022 JGP Poland I	26	33.28	26	59.74	26	93.02
Oct 15–16, 2022	(United Kingdom) 2022 Tayside Trophy	6	36.10	4	69.81	5	105.91
Nov 24–27, 2022	(Germany) 2022 NRW Trophy	11	38.49	11	66.28	11	104.77
Feb 23–26, 2023	(Netherlands) 2023 International Challenge Cup	10	34.20	10	64.16	10	98.36
