= Canadian Junior National Skating Championships =

Annual national figure skating competition

Canadian National Skating Championships
- Status: Active
- Genre: National championships
- Frequency: Annual
- Country: Canada
- Inaugurated: 1928
- Previous event: 2026 Canadian Championships
- Next event: 2027 Canadian Championships
- Organizer: Skate Canada

The Canadian Junior National Skating Championships (French: Championnats nationaux canadiens de patinage) are an annual figure skating competition organized by Skate Canada to crown the junior-level national champions of Canada. Medals are awarded in men's singles, women's singles, pair skating, ice dance, and synchronized skating. The event was called the Canadian Figure Skating Championships (French: Championnats du Canada de patinage artistique) prior to 2023, when synchronized skating, which had previously held separate championships, was folded into the competition along with the other figure skating disciplines. The results are among the criteria used to determine the Canadian entries to the World Junior Figure Skating Championships, as well as the members of the Canadian national team.

The first Canadian Championships for junior-level skaters were held in 1928 in Toronto and featured the men's and women's events. They have been interrupted only once. The 2021 championships were cancelled due to the COVID-19 pandemic; and in December 2021, due to Ontario's COVID-19 public health orders, Skate Canada announced that the 2022 Canadian Championships would be held in a closed arena without spectators or on-site media.

== Medallists ==
=== Men's singles ===
Junior men's event medallists
Year	Location	Gold	Silver	Bronze	Ref.
1928	Toronto	Stewart Reburn	Paul Belcourt	Jack Hose	
1929	Ottawa	Guy Owen	W.A.H. Kirkpatrick	Fraser Sweatman	
1930	Winnipeg	Lewis Elkin	Hubert Sprott	No other competitors	
1931	Toronto	Hubert Sprott	Osborne Colson	Rupert Whitehead	
1932	Toronto	Rupert Whitehead	Osborne Colson	Philip Lee	
1933	Montreal	Osborne Colson	Wingate Snaith	Ralph McCreath	
1934	Toronto	Philip Lee	Wingate Snaith	Ralph McCreath	
1935	Ottawa	Wingate Snaith	Ralph McCreath	Harrison Thomson	
1936	Toronto	Ralph McCreath	Jack Vigeon	Peter Chance	
1937	Montreal	Peter Chance	Jack Vigeon	Donald Gilchrist	
1938	Winnipeg	Jack Vigeon	Sandy McKechnie	Richard Salter	
1939	Toronto	Sandy McKechnie	Donald Gilchrist	Richard Salter	
1940	Ottawa	Denis Ross	Michael Kirby	John Milsom	
1941	Montreal	Michael Kirby	Dwight Parkinson	John Milsom	
1942	Winnipeg	Will Thomas	Nigel Stevens	Charles Lockwood	
1943	Toronto	Nigel Stevens	Norris Bowden	Frank Sellers	
1944	Toronto	Roger Wickson	Norris Bowden	No other competitors	
1945	Toronto	Frank Sellers	Gilles Trudeau	Richard McLaughlin	
1946	Toronto	Wallace Diestelmeyer	Gerrard Blair	Gordon Paul	
1947	Toronto	Gerrard Blair	William Lewis	Alain Pinard	
1948	Calgary	William Lewis	Donald Tobin	Alain Pinard	
1949	Ottawa	Donald Tobin	Peter Firstbrook	Malcolm Wickson	
1950	St. Catharines	Peter Firstbrook	Peter Dunfield	Alan Anderson	
1951	Vancouver	Peter Dunfield	Charles Snelling	Alan Anderson	
1952	Oshawa	Charles Snelling	Alan Anderson	Douglas Court	
1953	Ottawa	Douglas Court	Paul Tatton	Richard Rimmer	
1954	Calgary	Richard Rimmer	Norman Walker	David Lowery	
1955	Toronto	Donald Jackson	Robert Paul	Hugh Smith	
1956	Galt	Edward Collins	Robert Paul	David Lowery	
1957	Winnipeg	Hugh Smith	Carl Harrison	Harry Nevard	
1958	Ottawa	Carl Harrison	Louis Stong	Bradley Black	
1959	Noranda	Donald McPherson	Louis Stong	Larry Rost	
1960	Regina	Bradley Black	Louis Stong	Bill Neale	
1961	Lachine	Donald Knight	Bill Neale	Greg Folk	
1962	Toronto	Bill Neale	Greg Folk	Byron Topping	
1963	Edmonton	James Humphry	Philip McCordic	Toller Cranston	
1964	North Bay	Toller Cranston	Paul Crowther	Archie Zariski	
1965	Calgary	Steve Hutchinson	David McGillivray	Archie Zariski	
1966	Peterborough	David McGillivray	Doug Leigh	Joey Summerfield	
1967	Toronto	Bob Emerson	David Coffin	John MacWilliams	
1968	Vancouver	Patrick McKilligan	Jim Reid	John MacWilliams	
1969	Toronto	Paul Fisher	John MacWilliams	Ron Shaver	
1970	Edmonton	Robert Rubens	Urs Steinbrecher	Roger Uuemae	
1971	Winnipeg	Stan Bohonek	Kenneth Groff	Kevin Cottam	
1972	London	Lee Armstrong	Sandy Moore	Roger Uuemae	
1973	Vancouver	Ted Barton	Kevin Robertson	Sandy Moore	
1974	Moncton	Kevin Robertson	Sandy Moore	Brian Pockar	
1975	Quebec City	Kevin Hicks	Jim Szabo	Gary Beacom	
1976	London	Vern Taylor	Gary Beacom	Daniel Béland	
1977	Calgary	Gary Beacom	Daniel Béland	Gordon Forbes	
1978	Victoria	Dennis Coi	Daniel Béland	Brian Orser	
1979	Thunder Bay	Brian Orser	Kevin Parker	Shaun McGill	
1980	Kitchener	Neil Giroday	Campbell Sinclair	Mitch Giffin	
1981	Halifax	Neil Paterson	Shaun McGill	Louis Lasorsa	
1982	Brandon	Lyndon Johnston	Brad McLean	André Bourgeois	
1983	Montreal	Patrick Greasley	Lloyd Eisler	Marc Ferland	
1984	Regina	Jaimee Eggleton	Marc Ferland	David Nickel	
1985	Moncton	Kurt Browning	Matthew Hall	Lauren Patterson	
1986	North Bay	Michael Slipchuk	Darren Kemp	Martin Marceau	
1987	Ottawa	Norm Proft	Bernard Munger	Brent Frank	
1988	Victoria	Elvis Stojko	Stéphane Yvars	Marcus Christensen	
1989	Chicoutimi	Pierre Gignac	Kris Wirtz	Sébastien Britten	
1990	Sudbury	Sébastien Britten	Ian Connolly	Jean-François Hébert	
1991	Saskatoon	Herb Cherwoniak	Matthew Powers	Christopher Bourne	
1992	Moncton	Kelly Cruikshank	Jeffrey Langdon	Jean-François Hébert	
1993	Hamilton	Ravi Walla	David Pelletier	Matthew Knight	
1994	Edmonton	Matthew Smith	Yvan Desjardins	David Pelletier	
1995	Halifax	David D'Cruz	Daniel Bellemare	Paolo Vaccari	
1996	Ottawa	Collin Thompson	Jayson Dénommée	Ben Ferreira	
1997	Vancouver	Emanuel Sandhu	Guillano Cosentino	Ryan Hamilton	
1998	Hamilton	Hugh Yik	Jeffrey Buttle	lair Smith	
1999	Ottawa	Fedor Andreev	Blair Smith	Nicholas Young	
2000	Calgary	Nicholas Young	Marc-Olivier Bossé	Sean Wirtz	
2001	Winnipeg	Eriq Lyons	Maxim Lippé	Marc-André Craig	
2002	Hamilton	Shawn Sawyer	Keegan Murphy	Christopher Mabee	
2003	Saskatoon	Ken Rose	Cedric Demers	Vaughn Chipeur	
2004	Edmonton	Eric Radford	Dylan Moscovitch	Vaughn Chipeur	
2005	London	Patrick Chan	Kevin Reynolds	Maxime-Billy Fortin	
2006	Ottawa	Joey Russell	Jeremy Ten	Jamie Forsythe	
2007	Halifax	Jeremy Ten	Elladj Baldé	Jean-Simon Légaré	
2008	Vancouver	Elladj Baldé	Paul Poirier	Dave Ferland	
2009	Saskatoon	Andrei Rogozine	Paul Parkinson	Sébastien Wolfe	
2010	London	Liam Firus	Samuel Morais	Nam Nguyen	
2011	Victoria	Nam Nguyen	Shaquille Davis	Peter O'Brien	
2012	Moncton	Mitchell Gordon	Peter O'Brien	Joel Bond	
2013	Mississauga	Anthony Kan	Denis Margalik	Mathieu Nepton	
2014	Ottawa	Denis Margalik	Bennet Toman	Eric Liu	
2015	Kingston	Nicolas Nadeau	Antony Cheng	Edrian Paul Celestino	
2016	Halifax	Joseph Phan	Edrian Paul Celestino	Christian Reekie	
2017	Ottawa	Stephen Gogolev	Conrad Orzel	Samuel Turcotte	
2018	Vancouver	Matthew Markell	Corey Circelli	Zoé Duval-Yergeau	
2019	Saint John	Aleksa Rakic	Beres Clements	Corey Circelli	
2020	Mississauga	Corey Circelli	Wesley Chiu	Alec Guinzbourg	
2021	Vancouver	Competition cancelled due to the COVID-19 pandemic			
2022	Ottawa	Anthony Paradis	Grayson Long	John Kim	
2023	Oshawa	Edward Nicholas Vasii	Grayson Long	Anthony Paradis	
2024	Calgary	Terry Yu Tao Jin	David Li	David Shteyngart	
2025	Laval	David Bondar	Edward Vasii	David Howes	
2026	Gatineau	Parker Heiderich	William Chan	James Cha	

=== Women's singles ===
Junior women's event medallists
Year	Location	Gold	Silver	Bronze	Ref.
1928	Toronto	Dorothy Benson	Frances Claudet	Elizabeth Fisher	
1929	Ottawa	Elizabeth Fisher	Veronica Clarke	Frances Claudet	
1930	Winnipeg	Mary Littlejohn	Ruth Forrest	No other competitors	
1931	Toronto	Ruth Forrest	Veronica Clarke	Frances Fletcher	
1932	Toronto	Veronica Clarke	Kathleen Lopdell	Aidrie Main	
1933	Montreal	Margaret Henry	Margaret Leslie	Aidrie Main	
1934	Toronto	Margaret Leslie	Eleanor O'Meara	Aidrie Main	
1935	Ottawa	Joan Taylor	Eleanor O'Meara	Eleanor Wilson	
1936	Toronto	Dorothy Caley	Mary Rose Thacker	Virginia Wilson	
1937	Montreal	Mary Rose Thacker	Norah McCarthy	Audrey Miller	
1938	Winnipeg	Norah McCarthy	Audrey Miller	Therese McCarthy	
1939	Toronto	Therese McCarthy	Joan McNeil	Elizabeth McKellar	
1940	Ottawa	Barbara Ann Scott	Audrey Joyce	Christine Newson	
1941	Montreal	Patricia Gault	Shirley Halsted	Marilyn Ruth Take	
1942	Winnipeg	Cynthia Powell	Margaret McInnes	Doreen Dutton	
1943	Toronto	Nadine Phillips	Marilyn Ruth Take	Cynthia Powell	
1944	Toronto	Suzanne Thouin	Doreen Dutton	Anne Westcott	
1945	Toronto	Doreen Dutton	Patricia Earl	Pierrette Paquin	
1946	Toronto	Suzanne Morrow	Patricia Earl	Marlene Smith	
1947	Toronto	Vevi Smith	Marlene Smith	Jeanne Matthews	
1948	Calgary	Marlene Smith	Jeanne Matthews	Pearle Simmers	
1949	Ottawa	Maureen Senior	Barbara Gratton	Joyce Salo	
1950	St. Catharines	Barbara Gratton	Elizabeth Gratton	Jane Kirby	
1951	Vancouver	Elizabeth Gratton	Rosemary Henderson	Yarmila Pachl	
1952	Oshawa	Rosemary Henderson	Ann Johnston	Yarmila Pachl	
1953	Ottawa	Sonja Currie	Ann Johnston	Yarmila Pachl	
1954	Calgary	Joan Shippam	Dianne Williams	Karen Dixon	
1955	Toronto	Wanda June Beasley	Dianne Williams	Margaret Crosland	
1956	Galt	Margaret Crosland	Elaine Richards	Judy Lawrence	
1957	Winnipeg	Doreen Lister	Eleanor McLeod	Sandra Tewkesbury	
1958	Ottawa	Sonia Snelling	Frances Gold	Wendy Griner	
1959	Noranda	Wendy Griner	Eleanor McLeod	Shirra Kenworthy	
1960	Regina	Eleanor McLeod	Jocelyn Davidson	Darlene Turk	
1961	Lachine	Petra Burka	Norma Sedlar	Darlene Turk	
1962	Toronto	Valérie Jones	Norma Sedlar	Jennifer Jean Wilkin	
1963	Edmonton	Jennie Sanders	Gloria Tatton	Marjorie Hare	
1964	North Bay	Shirley Robson	Roberta Laurent	Marjorie Hare	
1965	Calgary	Karen Magnussen	Linda Ewisak	Linda Carbonetto	
1966	Peterborough	Cathy Lee Irwin	Linda Ewisak	Judy McLeod	
1967	Toronto	Heather Fraser	Diana Williams	Judy Williams	
1968	Vancouver	Judy Williams	Alana Wilson	Mary Ellen Kinsey	
1969	Toronto	Mary Petrie	Mary McCaffrey	Diane Hall	
1970	Edmonton	Arlene Hall	Daria Prychun	Julie Black	
1971	Winnipeg	Karel Lathem	Julie Black	Carol Farmer	
1972	London	Lynn Nightingale	Barbara Terpenning	Kathy Ostapchuk	
1973	Vancouver	Patty Welsh	Kim Alletson	Gigi Boyd	
1974	Moncton	Kim Alletson	Susan MacDonald	Kathy Ostapchuk	
1975	Quebec City	Camille Rebus	Heather Anderson	Julie Bowerman	
1976	London	Deborah Albright	Karen Felesko	Carolyn Skoczen	
1977	Calgary	Cathy MacFarlane	Carolyn Skoczen	Janet Morrissey	
1978	Victoria	Pattie Black	Sandra Leighton	Yvonne Anderson	
1979	Thunder Bay	Kay Thomson	Yvonne Anderson	Kathryn Osterberg	
1980	Kitchener	Kerry Smith	Elizabeth Manley	Diane Stewart	
1981	Halifax	Diane Ogibowski	Andrea Hall	Diane Stewart	
1982	Brandon	Monica Lipson	Natalie Reimer	Lana Sherman	
1983	Montreal	Melissa Murphy	Barbara Butler	Tracey Robertson	
1984	Regina	Rosmarie Sakic	Nathalie Sasseville	Melinda Kunhegyi	
1985	Moncton	Nathalie Sasseville	Dianne Takeuchi	Linda Florkevich	
1986	North Bay	Pamela Giangualano	Shannon Allison	Angie Folk	
1987	Ottawa	Angie Folk	Josée Arseneault	Joelle Batten	
1988	Victoria	Tanya Bingert	Josée Chouinard	Karen Preston	
1989	Chicoutimi	Margot Bion	Colleen Moir	Candace Daku	
1990	Sudbury	Jacquie Taylor	Mary Angela Larmer-Wilson	Stacey Ball	
1991	Saskatoon	Netty Kim	Julie Hughes	Sherry Ball	
1992	Moncton	Angela Derochie	Cathy Belanger	Nancy Lemieux	
1993	Hamilton	Keyla Ohs	Jessica Sheard	Andreanna Plante	
1994	Edmonton	Jennifer Robinson	Tammy Smigelski	Jamie Salé	
1995	Halifax	Rebecca Salisbury	Kerry Salmoni	Alison Bennett	
1996	Ottawa	Martine Dagenais	Jamie Renee Beresnak	Nancy Lance	
1997	Vancouver	Sarah Schmidek	Stefanie Partridge	Nathalie Cousineau	
1998	Hamilton	Marie Laurier	Veronique Lainesse	Samantha Marchant	
1999	Ottawa	Leah Hepner	Rhea Sy	Cynthia Lemaire	
2000	Calgary	Marianne Dubuc	Audrey Thibault	Janina Louie	
2001	Winnipeg	Joannie Rochette	Courtney Sokal	Marie-Luc Jodoin	
2002	Hamilton	Lauren Wilson	Cynthia Phaneuf	Signe Ronka	
2003	Saskatoon	Meagan Duhamel	Amanda Billings	Elizabeth Putnam	
2004	Edmonton	Myriane Samson	Jessica Dubé	Erin Scherrer	
2005	London	Amélie Lacoste	Tanika Gibbons	Amanda Valentine	
2006	Ottawa	Diane Szmiett	Stefani Marotta	Devon Neuls	
2007	Halifax	Dana Zhalko-Tytarenko	McKenzie Pedersen	Cecylia Witkowski	
2008	Vancouver	Kelsey McNeil	Vanessa Grenier	Amanda Velenosi	
2009	Saskatoon	Kate Charbonneau	Cambria Little	Rylie McCulloch-Casarsa	
2010	London	Eri Nishimura	Alana Tidy	Kaetlyn Osmond	
2011	Victoria	Roxanne Rheault	Kitty Qian	Julianna Sagaria	
2012	Moncton	Gabrielle Daleman	Véronik Mallet	Julianne Séguin	
2013	Mississauga	Larkyn Austman	Marika Steward	Madelyn Dunley	
2014	Ottawa	Kim De Guise Léveillée	Julianne Delaurier	Madelyn Dunley	
2015	Kingston	Selena Zhao	Cailey England	Justine Belzile	
2016	Halifax	Sarah Tamura	Alicia Pineault	Megan Yim	
2017	Ottawa	Aurora Cotop	Emily Bausback	Alison Schumacher	
2018	Vancouver	Olivia Gran	Sarah-Maude Blanchard	Victoria Bocknek	
2019	Saint John	Hannah Dawson	Madeline Schizas	Reagan Scott	
2020	Mississauga	Kaiya Ruiter	Emily Millard	Kristina Ivanova	
2021	Vancouver	Competition cancelled due to the COVID-19 pandemic			
2022	Ottawa	Justine Miclette	Fiona Bombardier	Michelle Deng	
2023	Oshawa	Hetty Shi	Rose Théroux	Aleksa Volkova	
2024	Calgary	Lulu Lin	Aleksa Volkova	Mély-Ann Gagner	
2025	Laval	Lia Cho	Ksenia Krouzkevitch	Sandrine Blais	
2026	Gatineau	Lia Cho	Victoria Barakhtina	Quinn Startek	

=== Pairs ===
Junior pairs' event medallists
Year	Location	Gold	Silver	Bronze	Ref.
1933	Montreal	Mary Jane Halsted; Bruce Scythes	Kathleen Lopdell; Donald Cruickshank	Joan Taylor; Osborne Colson	
1934	Toronto	Audrey Garland; Fraser Sweatman	Eva Lopdell; Robert Surtees	Bunty Lang; Ralph McCreath	
1935	Ottawa	Elizabeth Chambers; Ralph McCreath	Patricia Beauchesne; Robert Surtees	Margaret Symington; Charles Askwith Jr.	
1936	Toronto	Audrey Joyce; Harrison Thomson	Betty Riley; Jack Kilgour	Margaret Symington; Charles Askwith Jr.	
1937	Montreal	Betty Riley; Jack Kilgour	Margaret Symington; Charles Askwith	Patricia Chown; Philip Lee	
1938	Winnipeg	Patricia Chown; Philip Lee	Ruth Hall; Sandy McKechnie	Kathleen Lopdell; Peter Chance	
1939	Toronto	Kathleen Lopdell; Peter Chance	Margaret Wilson; Peter Killam	Florence McNamara; George Reid	
1940	Ottawa	Shirley Halsted; Michael Kirby	Margaret Wilson; Peter Killam	Helen Malcolm; Peter Stranger	
1941	Montreal	Margaret Wilson; Peter Killam	Floraine Ducharme; Wallace Diestelmeyer	Ruth Shuttleworth; Bob Ivey	
1942	Winnipeg	Floraine Ducharme; Wallace Diestelmeyer	Sheila Reid; Fred Drewry	Dorothy Benson; Douglas Coughtry	
1943	Toronto	Margaret Keeley; Alex Fulton	Mary McPherson; John Greig	Diane Franklin Jones; Will White Jr.	
1944	Toronto	Sheila Smith; Ross Smith	Marilyn Ruth Take; Will White Jr.	Mary McPherson; John Greig	
1945	Toronto	Suzanne Morrow; Norris Bowden	Joan McLeod; William de Nance Jr.	No other competitors	
1946	Toronto	Marnie Brereton; Richard McLaughlin	Jacqueline Byers; Gordon Paul	Joan Duval; John Webster	
1947	Toronto	Bette Wrinch; Thornton Opie	Joy Forsyth; Donald Taylor	Mary Kenner; Peter Firstbrook	
1948	Calgary	Pearle Simmers; David Spalding	Jane Kirby; Donald Tobin	Shirley Martin; Ronald Finney	
1949	Ottawa	Joy Forsyth; Ronald Vincent	Arden Spearing; Clifford Spearing	Patricia Montgomery; George Montgomery	
1950	St. Catharines	Jane Kirby; Donald Tobin	Shirley Ann Deyell; Paul Tatton	No other competitors	
1951	Vancouver	Audrey Downie; Brian Power	Patricia Montgomery; George Montgomery	Elizabeth Redpath; Jean Gaudreault	
1952	Oshawa	Patricia Spray; Norman Walker	Arden Spearing; Clifford Spearing	Kathleen Hill; Bernard Youlten	
1953	Ottawa	Dawn Steckley; David Lowery	Patty Lou Montgomery; George Montgomery	Barbara Wagner; Robert Paul	
1954	Calgary	Barbara Wagner; Robert Paul	Dianne Nielson; Edwin Cossitt	Gale Rennie; Dennis McFarlane	
1955	Toronto	Maria Jelinek; Otto Jelinek	Dianne Nielson; Edwin Cossitt	No other competitors	
1956	Galt	Barbara Bourne; Tom Monypenny	Jane Sinclair; Larry Rost	Joan McLeod; Carl Harrison	
1957	Winnipeg	Joan McLeod; Carl Harrison	Jane Sinclair; Larry Rost	Patricia Scott; Ian Knight	
1958	Ottawa	Judith Rudd; Alastair Munro	Lisa Joan Petit; Ian Knight	Carol Ann Biamonte; William Neale	
1959	Noranda	Debbi Wilkes; Guy Revell	Jane Sinclair; Larry Rost	Gertrude Desjardins; Maurice Lafrance	
1960	Regina	Gertrude Desjardins; Maurice Lafrance	Elinor Flack; Philip McCordick	Pat Marrs; Frank Clark	
1961	Lachine	Elinor Flack; Philip McCordick	Wendy Warne; Jim Watters	Susan Herriott; Michael Hart	
1962	Toronto	Alexis Shields; Christopher Shields	Linda Ann Ward; Neil Carpenter	Bonnie Fuoco; Vernon Hartt	
1963	Edmonton	Linda Ann Ward; Neil Carpenter	Wendy Warne; Jim Watters	Susan Huehnergard; Paul Huehnergard	
1964	North Bay	Susan Huehnergard; Paul Huehnergard	Sharon Davis; Ross Garner	Betty McKilligan; John McKilligan	
1965	Calgary	Betty McKilligan; John McKilligan	Derijan Redsell; Ross Garner	Anna Forder; Richard Stephens	
1966	Peterborough	Anna Forder; Richard Stephens	Nancy Dover; Steven Dover	Helen Askew; Richard Askew	
1967	Toronto	Mary Jane Oke; Victor Irving	Mary Petrie; Robert McAvoy	Maureen Walker; Dick Shedlowski	
1968	Vancouver	Maureen Walker; Dick Shedlowski	Mary Petrie; Robert McAvoy	Nicola Gafuik; Dan Dorohoy	
1969	Toronto	Mary Petrie; Robert McAvoy	Sandra Bezic; Val Bezic	Debbie Jones; Michael Bradley	
1970	Edmonton	Marian Murray; Glenn Moore	Elizabeth Taylor; John Hubbel	Linda Tasker; Allen Carson	
1971	Winnipeg	Linda Tasker; Allen Carson	Daria Prychun; Roger Uuemae	Nancy Gruhl; Richard Gruhl	
1972	London	Linda Watts; Don Fraser	Daria Prychun; Roger Uuemae	Marie-Ellen Souche; Bernard Souche	
1973	Vancouver	Kathy Hutchinson; Jamie McGrigor	Marie-Ellen Souche; Bernard Souche	Nancy Gruhl; Richard Gruhl	
1974	Moncton	Cheri Pinner; Dennis Pinner	Karen Newton; Glen Laframboise	Christine McBeth; Rob Dick	
1975	Quebec City	Marie-Ellen Souche; Bernard Souche	Karen Newton; Glen Laframboise	Janet Hominuke; Mark Hominuke	
1976	London	Lynne Begin; Mark Gignac	Sherri Baier; Robin Cowan	Janet Hominuke; Mark Hominuke	
1977	Calgary	Josée France; Paul Mills	Sherri Baier; Robin Cowan	Leslie Casper; Eric Thomsen	
1978	Victoria	Barbara Underhill; Paul Martini	Lori Baier; Lloyd Eisler	Katherina Matousek; Brad Starchuk	
1979	Thunder Bay	Lori Baier; Lloyd Eisler	Becky Gough; Mark Rowsom	Katherina Matousek; William O'Neill	
1980	Kitchener	Becky Gough; Mark Rowsom	Mary Jo Fedy; Tim Mills	Janice Shomphe; Lyndon Johnston	
1981	Halifax	Melinda Kunhegyi; Lyndon Johnston	Mary Jo Fedy; Tim Mills	Vanessa Howe; Jeff Mawle	
1982	Brandon	Julie Brault; Richard Gauthier	Bonnie Epp; Leonard Warkentin	Leslie Robinson; Neil Tymoruski	
1983	Montreal	Lynda Ivanich; John Ivanich	Laurene Collin; David Howe	Lynn Frasson; Doug Ladret	
1984	Regina	Penny Schultz; Scott Grover	Isabelle Kourie; Guy Trudeau	Bonnie Epp; John Penticost	
1985	Moncton	Isabelle Brasseur; Pascal Courchesne	Barbara Martin; John Penticost	Denise Benning; Alan Kerslake	
1986	North Bay	Melanie Gaylor; Lee Barkell	Katherine Kates; Robert Kates	Michelle Menzies; Kevin Wheeler	
1987	Ottawa	Michelle Menzies; Kevin Wheeler	Twana Rose; Colin Epp	Jodi Barnes; Rob Williams	
1988	Victoria	Cindy Landry; Sylvain Lalonde	Marie-Josée Fortin; Jean-Michel Bombardier	Twana Rose; Colin Epp	
1989	Chicoutimi	Marie-Josée Fortin; Jean-Michel Bombardier	Stacey Ball; Kris Wirtz	Marie-Claude Savard-Gagnon; Luc Bradet	
1990	Sudbury	Marie-Claude Savard-Gagnon; Luc Bradet	Kristy Sargeant; Colin Epp	Allison Gaylor; John Robinson	
1991	Saskatoon	Penny Papaioannou; Raoul LeBlanc	Jamie Salé; Jason Turner	Annik Douaire; Martin Gaudreault	
1992	Moncton	Jamie Salé; Jason Turner	Caroline Haddad; Jean-Sébastien Fecteau	Jodeyne Higgins; Sean Rice	
1993	Hamilton	Julie Laporte; David Pelletier	Isabelle Coulombe; Bruno Marcotte	Kelly Mackenzie; David Annecca	
1994	Edmonton	Isabelle Coulombe; Bruno Marcotte	Fabiana Prudente; Andrew Bertleff	Marilyn Luis; Patrice Archetto	
1995	Halifax	Marilyn Luis; Patrice Archetto	Samantha Marchant; Chad Hawse	Jennifer Pregnolato; Sébastien Morin	
1996	Ottawa	Samantha Marchant; Chad Hawse	Nadine Prenovost; David Annecca	Kara Rijnen; Michael Pollard	
1997	Vancouver	Marie Laurier; Shane Dennison	Jaime O'Reilly; Clinton Petersen	Marnie Wade; Lenny Faustino	
1998	Hamilton	Marie-France Lachapelle; Sacha Blanchet	Jaime O'Reilly; Clinton Petersen	Jacinthe Larivière; Lenny Faustino	
1999	Ottawa	Jessica Sawkins; C.J. Pugh	Jamie O'Reilly; David Moellenkamp	Chantal Poirier-Saikaly; Dany Provost	
2000	Calgary	Chantal Poirier; Craig Buntin	Jennifer Dubois; Sean Wirtz	Melissa Mazzon; Mark Leslie	
2001	Winnipeg	Johanna Purdy; Kevin Maguire	Carla Montgomery; Jarvis Hetu	D'Laney Bruneau; Clinton Petersen	
2002	Hamilton	Carla Montgomery; Ryan Arnold	Meeran Trombley; Jesse Sturdy	Cathy Monette; Daniel Castelo	
2003	Saskatoon	Jessica Dubé; Samuel Tetrault	Lindsay McCaustlin; Christopher Davies	Aimee Collier; Christopher Richardson	
2004	Edmonton	Jessica Dubé; Bryce Davison	Terra Findlay; John Mattatall	Michelle Cronin; Brian Shales	
2005	London	Michelle Cronin; Brian Shales	Becky Cosford; Christopher Richardson	Stephanie Valois; Jonathan Boudreau-Beland	
2006	Ottawa	Kyra Moscovitch; Dylan Moscovitch	Rachel Kirkland; Eric Radford	Taylor Steele; Robert Paxton	
2007	Halifax	Carolyn MacCuish; Andrew Evans	Amanda Velenosi; Mark Fernandez	Sarah McCoy; Aaron Van Cleave	
2008	Vancouver	Monica Pisotta; Michael Stewart	Paige Lawrence; Rudi Swiegers	Christi Anne Steele; Adam Johnson	
2009	Saskatoon	Brittany Jones; Kurtis Gaskell	Sara Jones; Jeremy Sandor	Maddison Bird; Raymond Schultz	
2010	London	Margaret Purdy; Michael Marinaro	Tara Hancherow; Sébastien Wolfe	Katherine Bobak; Matthew Penasse	
2011	Victoria	Natasha Purich; Raymond Schultz	Tara Hancherow; Sébastien Wolfe	Katherine Bobak; Matthew Penasse	
2012	Moncton	Katherine Bobak; Ian Beharry	Krystel Desjardins; Charlie Bilodeau	Mary Orr; Anthony Furiano	
2013	Mississauga	Hayleigh Bell; Alistair Sylvester	Natasha Purich; Sebastian Arcieri	Mary Orr; Anthony Furiano	
2014	Ottawa	Vanessa Grenier; Maxime Deschamps	Julianne Séguin; Charlie Bilodeau	Mary Orr; Phelan Simpson	
2015	Kingston	Mary Orr; Phelan Simpson	Shalena Rau; Sebastian Arcieri	Rachael Dobson; Alexander Sheldrick	
2016	Halifax	Hope McLean; Trennt Michaud	Bryn Hoffman; Bryce Chudak	Allison Eby; Brett Varley	
2017	Ottawa	Evelyn Walsh; Trennt Michaud	Lori-Ann Matte; Thierry Ferland	Olivia Boys-Eddy; Mackenzie Boys-Eddy	
2018	Vancouver	Lori-Ann Matte; Thierry Ferland	Patricia Andrew; Paxton Knott	Gabrielle Levesque; Pier-Alexandre Hudon	
2019	Saint John	Chloe Choinard; Mathieu Ostiguy	Brooke McIntosh; Brandon Toste	Gabrielle Levesque; Pier-Alexandre Hudon	
2020	Mississauga	Patricia Andrew; Zachary Daleman	Gabrielle Levesque; Pier-Alexandre Hudon	Kelly Ann Laurin; Loucas Éthier	
2021	Vancouver	Competition cancelled due to the COVID-19 pandemic			
2022	Ottawa	Brooke McIntosh; Benjamin Mimar	Summer Homick; Marty Haubrich	Emy Carignan; Bryan Pierro	
2023	Oshawa	Chloe Panetta; Kieran Thrasher	Ava Kemp; Yohnatan Elizarov	Martina Ariano Kent; Alexis Leduc	
2024	Calgary	Ava Kemp; Yohnatan Elizarov	Martina Ariano Kent; Charly Laliberté-Laurent	Jazmine Desrochers; Kieran Thrasher	
2025	Laval	Ava Kemp; Yohnatan Elizarov	Martina Ariano Kent; Charly Laliberté-Laurent	Julia Quattrocchi; Simon Desmarais	
2026	Gatineau	Julia Quattrocchi; Étienne Lacasse	Brianna Dion; Jacob Côté	Rebecca Laiu; Marty Haubrich	

=== Ice dance ===
Junior ice dance event medallists
Year	Location	Gold	Silver	Bronze	Ref.
1953	Ottawa	Geraldine Fenton; Glen Skuce	Claudette Lacaille; Jeffery Johnston	Patty Lou Montgomery; George Montgomery	
1954	Calgary	Doreen Leech; Norman Walker	Claudette Lacaille; Jeffery Johnston	Leone Miller; Dennis McFarlane	
1955	Toronto	Barbara Jean Jacques; Gordon Manzie	Helen Lawson; Max Gould	Elizabeth Parkinson; Dwight Parkinson	
1956	Galt	Beverley Orr; Hugh Smith	Elaine Protheroe; William Trimble	Peggy Brown; Rod McDonald	
1957	Winnipeg	Elaine Protheroe; William Trimble	Svata Staroba; Mirek Staroba	Florence Morgan; Jack Morgan	
1958	Ottawa	Svata Staroba; Mirek Staroba	Ann Martin; Edward Collins	Eleanor McLeod; Carl Harrison	
1959	Noranda	Vivian Tutton; Gilles Vanasse	Marijane Lennie; Karl Benzing	Donna Lee Mitchell; John Mitchell	
1960	Regina	Donna Lee Mitchell; John Mitchell	Marijane Lennie; Karl Benzing	Vivian Percival; Roger Wickson	
1961	Lachine	Paulette Doan; Kenneth Ormsby	Marilyn Crawford; Blair Armitage	Judith Richardson; Brian Bailie	
1962	Toronto	Carole Forrest; Kevin Lethbridge	Marilyn Berry; Richard Dunlap	Gail Snyder; Wayne Palmer	
1963	Edmonton	Bunne Lilley; John Booker	Lynn Matthews; Bryon Topping	Judith Richardson; Brian Bailie	
1964	North Bay	Gail Snyder; Wayne Palmer	Lynn Matthews; Bryon Topping	Mary Ellen McQuarrie; Jim Hibak	
1965	Calgary	Judy Henderson; John Bailey	Joni Graham; Don Phillips	Dale Newmarch; Bryce Swetnam	
1966	Peterborough	Joni Graham; Don Phillips	Janet Cowling; Thomas Falls	Maureen Peever; Bruce Lennie	
1967	Toronto	Donna Taylor; Bruce Lennie	Mary Church; Tom Falls	Hazel Pike; Phillip Boskill	
1968	Vancouver	Mary Church; Tom Falls	Hazel Pike; Phillip Boskill	Louise Lind; Barry Soper	
1969	Toronto	Louise Lind; Barry Soper	Brenda Sandys; James Holden	Beth Ralbosky; Richard Dowding	
1970	Edmonton	Linda Roe; Kevin Cottam	Judy Currah; Keith Caughell	Brenda Sandys; James Holden	
1971	Winnipeg	Barbara Berezowski; David Porter	Judy Currah; Keith Caughell	Lynn Peckinpaugh; Eric Gillies	
1972	London	Judy Currah; Keith Caughell	Shelley MacLeod; Robert Knapp	Debra Robertson; Greg Ladret	
1973	Vancouver	Deborah Dowding; John Dowding	Debra Robertson; Greg Ladret	Ginnie Greico; John Rait	
1974	Moncton	Susan Carscallen; Eric Gillies	Ginnie Greico; John Rait	Debbie Burke; Randy Burke	
1975	Quebec City	Judie Jeffcoat; Keith Swindlehurst	Deborah Young; Greg Young	Amy Martin; David Martin	
1976	London	Deborah Young; Greg Young	Amy Martin; David Martin	Janice Blakely; Michael de la Penotiere	
1977	Calgary	Marie McNeil; Rob McCall	Julie Hammonds; Bob Heighington	Joanne French; John Thomas	
1978	Victoria	Joanne French; John Thomas	Lillian Heming; Murray Carey	Martine Vigouret; Alan Atkins	
1979	Thunder Bay	Kelly Johnson; Kris Barber	Gina Aucoin; Peter Ponikau	Darlene Wendt; Wayne Hussey	
1980	Kitchener	Tracy Wilson; Mark Stokes	Donna Martini; John Coyne	Tracy Michael; Kerry Spong	
1981	Halifax	Karyn Garossino; Rod Garossino	Karen Taylor; Robert Burk	Donna Martini; John Coyne	
1982	Brandon	Teri-Lynn Black; Mirko Savic	Isabelle Duchesnay; Paul Duchesnay	Michelle McDonald; Patrick Mandley	
1983	Montreal	Michelle McDonald; Patrick Mandley	Jo-Anne Borlase; Scott Chalmers	Christine Horton; Michael Farrington	
1984	Regina	Christine Horton; Michael Farrington	Jo-Anne Borlase; Scott Chalmers	Penny Mann; Richard Perkins	
1985	Moncton	Penny Mann; Richard Perkins	Kim Hanford; Julien Lalonde	Monica Degeman; David Drezdoff	
1986	North Bay	Melanie Cole; Martin Smith	Nathalie Lessard; Darcy Pleckham	Catherine Pal; Donald Godfrey	
1987	Ottawa	Catherine Pal; Donald Godfrey	Jacqueline Petr; Mark Janoschak	Pamela Watson; Aimée LeBlanc	
1988	Victoria	Jacqueline Petr; Mark Janoschak	Julie Marcotte; Juan Carlos Noria	Chantal Loyer; Rock LeMay	
1989	Chicoutimi	Julie Marcotte; Juan Carlos Noria	Jennifer Nocito; Brad Hopkins	Allison MacLean; Konrad Schaub	
1990	Sudbury	Isabelle Labossière; Mitchell Gould	Marie-France Dubreuil; Bruno Yvars	Brigette Richer; Michel Brunet	
1991	Saskatoon	Marie-France Dubreuil; Bruno Yvars	Amélie Dion; Alexandre Alain	Martine Patenaude; Eric Massé	
1992	Moncton	Shae-Lynn Bourne; Victor Kraatz	Amélie Dion; Alexandre Alain	Martine Michaud; Sylvain Leclerc	
1993	Hamilton	Martine Michaud; Sylvain Leclerc	Elizabeth Hollett; Pierre-Hugues Chouinard	Josée Piché; Pascal Denis	
1994	Edmonton	Chantal Lefebvre; Patrice Lauzon	Josée Piché; Pascal Denis	Megan Wing; Aaron Lowe	
1995	Halifax	Amanda Cotroneo; Mark Bradshaw	Chantal Ares; Chuck Reaman	Isabelle Bourgault; Jonathan Lapointe	
1996	Ottawa	Dara Henderson; Jonathan Pankratz	Laura Currie; Jeff Smith	Teri Ninacs; Kevin Cheshire	
1997	Vancouver	Laura Currie; Jeff Smith	Cindy Bouras; Jean-Nicolas Chagnon	Sonia Francoeur; Michel Bigras	
1998	Hamilton	Rebecca Babb; Joshua Babb	Marjolaine Mineau; Dana Grant	Sonia Francoeur; Robert Kiricsi	
1999	Ottawa	Brenda Key; Ryan Smith	Marie-Pierre Chalifoux; Daniel Turpin	Melissa Ackad; Mathieu Rainville	
2000	Calgary	Melissa Ackad; Mathieu Rainville	Kristy MacCabe; Brian Innes	Sheri Moir; Danny Moir	
2001	Winnipeg	Tara Doherty; Tyler Myles	Sheri Moir; Danny Moir	Lauren Flynn; Leif Gislason	
2002	Hamilton	Mylène Girard; Brian Innes	Lauren Flynn; Leif Gislason	Sabrina Granata; Bradley Yaeger	
2003	Saskatoon	Melissa Piperno; Liam Dougherty	Mylène Girard; Bradley Yaeger	Siobhan Karam; Joshua McGrath	
2004	Edmonton	Tessa Virtue; Scott Moir	Lauren Senft; Leif Gislason	Siobhan Karam; Joshua McGrath	
2005	London	Siobhan Karam; Joshua McGrath	Allie Hann-McCurdy; Michael Coreno	Alice Graham; Andrew Poje	
2006	Ottawa	Allie Hann-McCurdy; Michael Coreno	Mylène Lamoureux; Michael Mee	Andrea Chong; Spencer Barnes	
2007	Halifax	Vanessa Crone; Paul Poirier	Joanna Lenko; Mitchell Islam	Sophie Knippel; Matthew Doleman	
2008	Vancouver	Kharis Ralph; Asher Hill	Karen Routhier; Eric Saucke-Lacelle	Sophie Knippel; Andrew Britten	
2009	Saskatoon	Karen Routhier; Eric Saucke-Lacelle	Tarrah Harvey; Keith Gagnon	Alexandra Paul; Jason Cheperdak	
2010	London	Alexandra Paul; Mitchell Islam	Olivia Nicole Martins; Alvin Chau	Abby Carswell; Andrew Doleman	
2011	Victoria	Nicole Orford; Thomas Williams	Kelly Oliveira; Jordan Hockley	Victoria Hasegawa; Connor Hasegawa	
2012	Moncton	Andréanne Poulin; Marc-André Servant	Madeline Edwards; Zhao Kai Pang	Noa Bruser; Timothy Lum	
2013	Mississauga	Madeline Edwards; Zhao Kai Pang	Mackenzie Bent; Garrett MacKeen	Caelen Dalmer; Shane Firus	
2014	Ottawa	Mackenzie Bent; Garrett MacKeen	Melinda Meng; Andrew Meng	Brianna Delmaestro; Timothy Lum	
2015	Kingston	Brianna Delmaestro; Timothy Lum	Lauren Collins; Shane Firus	Melinda Meng; Andrew Meng	
2016	Halifax	Mackenzie Bent; Dmitre Razgulajevs	Marjorie Lajoie; Zachary Lagha	Melinda Meng; Andrew Meng	
2017	Ottawa	Marjorie Lajoie; Zachary Lagha	Ashlynne Stairs; Lee Royer	Danielle Wu; Nik Mirzakhani	
2018	Vancouver	Marjorie Lajoie; Zachary Lagha	Olivia McIsaac; Elliott Graham	Ashlynne Stairs; Lee Royer	
2019	Saint John	Marjorie Lajoie; Zachary Lagha	Alicia Fabbri; Paul Ayer	Natalie D'Alessandro; Bruce Waddell	
2020	Mississauga	Emmy Bronsard; Aissa Bouaraguia	Nadiia Bashynska; Peter Beaumont	Olivia McIsaac; Corey Circelli	
2021	Vancouver	Competition cancelled due to the COVID-19 pandemic			
2022	Ottawa	Natalie D'Alessandro; Bruce Waddell	Nadiia Bashynska; Peter Beaumont	Miku Makita; Tyler Gunara	
2023	Oshawa	Nadiia Bashynska; Peter Beaumont	Sandrine Gauthier; Quentin Thieren	Hailey Yu; Brendan Giang	
2024	Calgary	Layla Veillon; Alexander Brandys	Chloe Nguyen; Brendan Giang	Alisa Korneva; Kieran MacDonald	
2025	Laval	Chloe Nguyen; Brendan Giang	Sandrine Gauthier; Quentin Thieren	Layla Veillon; Alexander Brandys	
2026	Gatineau	Layla Veillon; Alexander Brandys	Summer Homick; Nicholas Buelow	Charlie Anderson; Cayden Dawson	

=== Synchronized skating ===
Junior synchronized event medallists
Year	Location	Gold	Silver	Bronze	Ref.
For results prior to 2023, see Canadian Synchronized Skating Championships
2023	Oshawa	NEXXICE	Les Suprêmes	Gold Ice	
2024	Calgary	Les Suprêmes	NEXXICE	Nova	
2025	Laval	Les Suprêmes	NEXXICE	Nova	
2026	Gatineau	NEXXICE	Les Suprêmes	Nova	

== Works cited ==
- Hines, James R. (2006). Figure Skating: A History. University of Illinois Press. ISBN 978-0-252-07286-4.
- Stevens, Ryan (2025). The Almanac of Canadian Figure Skating (2nd ed.). Halifax, Nova Scotia. ISBN 979-8-362-03096-4.
