= 1977 World Junior Figure Skating Championships =

- Type: ISU Championship
- Date: February 8 – 12
- Season: 1976–77
- Location: Megève, France

Champions
- Men's singles: (Canada) Daniel Béland
- Women's singles: (Canada) Carolyn Skoczen
- Pairs: (Canada) Josée France and Paul Mills
- Ice dance: (United Kingdom) Wendy Sessions and Mark Reed
- Previous: 1976 World Junior Championships
- Next: 1978 World Junior Championships

The 1977 World Junior Figure Skating Championships were held on February 8–12, 1977 in Megève, France. Sanctioned by the International Skating Union, it was the second edition of an annual competition in which figure skaters compete for the title of world junior champion. Medals were awarded in the disciplines of men's singles, women's singles, pair skating, and ice dance.

== Results ==
=== Men's singles ===
Rank	Name	Nation	CF	SP	FS	SP+FS	Points	Places
1	Daniel Béland	Canada						
2	Mark Pepperday	Great Britain						
3	Richard Furrer	Switzerland						
4	Michael Pasfield	Australia						
5	Helmut Kristofics-Binder	Austria						
6	Philippe Paulet	France						
7	Shinji Someya	Japan						
8	Christopher Howarth	Great Britain						
9	Joachim Edel	West Germany						
10	Lars Åkesson	Sweden						
11	Nagao Kobayashi	Japan						
WD	Hervé Pornet	France						

=== Women's singles ===
Rank	Name	Nation	CF	SP	FS	SP+FS	Points	Places
1	Carolyn Skoczen	Canada						
2	Christa Jorda	Austria						
3	Corine Wyrsch	Switzerland						
4	Cecile Antonelli	France						
5	Lynne Rickatson	Great Britain						
6	Carolyn Dunkeld	Great Britain						
7	Yoko Yakushi	Japan						
8	Karin Riedieger	West Germany						
9	Rudina Pasveer	Netherlands						
10	Patricia Claret	Switzerland						
11	Karina Tanski	West Germany						
12	Vicki Holland	Australia						
13	Marcelle Byrne	Australia						
14	Karin Telser	Italy						
15	Pia Snellman	Finland						
16	Genevieve Schoumacker	Belgium						
17	Tammy Grenfell	South Africa						

=== Pairs ===
Rank	Name	Nation	SP	FS	Points	Places
1	Josée France / Paul Mills	Canada				
2	Elga Balk / Gavin MacPherson	South Africa				

=== Ice dance ===
Rank	Name	Nation	CD	FD	Points	Places
1	Wendy Sessions / Mark Reed	Great Britain				
2	Karen Barber / Kim Spreyer	Great Britain				
3	Marie McNeil / Robert McCall	Canada				
4	Anne-Sophie Druet / Laruent Mazarguil	France				
5	Catherine Le Bail / Pierre Béchu	France				
6	Henriette Froschl / Christian Steiner	West Germany				
7	Paola Casalotti / Sergio Ceserani	Italy				
8	Nathalie Hervé / Pierre Husarek	France				
9	Michiko Abe / Masomu Sakai	Japan				
