= 1976 World Junior Figure Skating Championships =

- Type: ISU Championship
- Date: 10 – 13 March
- Season: 1976
- Location: Megève, France

Champions
- Men's singles: (United States) Mark Cockerell
- Ladies' singles: (United States) Suzie Brasher
- Pairs: (Canada) Sherri Baier / Robin Cowan
- Ice dance: (United Kingdom) Kathryn Winter / Nicholas Slater
- Previous: –
- Next: 1977 World Junior Championships

The 1976 World Junior Figure Skating Championships took place on 10–13 March 1976 in Megève, France. Sanctioned by the International Skating Union in which younger figure skaters compete for the title of World Junior Champion. It was the first World Junior Figure Skating Championships to be held.

== Results ==
=== Men ===
Rank	Name	Nation	CF	SP	FS	SP+FS	Points	Places
1	Mark Cockerell	United States	4	3	1	1	172.42	11
2	Takashi Mura	Japan	9	2	2	2	165.70	24
3	Brian Pockar	Canada	1	1	5	3	166.62	23
4	Norbert Schramm	West Germany	7	4	3	4	159.80	40
5	Andrew Bestwick	United Kingdom	13	5	4	5	158.10	48
6	Stephan Bril	West Germany	5	7	7	7	155.72	57
7	Patrice Macrez	France	12	6	6	6	151.76	71
8	Pierre Lamine	France	6	10	8	8	150.50	79
9	Shinji Someya	Japan	3	12	10	10	150.34	74.5
10	Jozef Sabovčík	Czechoslovakia	11	9	9	9	148.88	87
11	Daniel Fuerer	Switzerland	2	8	15	13	146.18	92.5
12	Gerald Schranz	Austria	10	11	11	11	143.04	102
13	Helmut Kristofics-Binder	Austria	8	16	14	15	137.32	123
14	Michael Pasfield	Australia	17	13	12	12	136.60	119
15	Francis Demarteau	Belgium	18	14	13	14	131.02	140
16	Adrian Vasile	Romania	15	15	17	16	127.74	143
17	Miljan Begović	Yugoslavia	16	18	16	17	127.30	143
18	Jeremy Dowson	South Africa	19	17	18	18	114.98	166
19	Marc Franquet	Belgium	14	19	19	19	114.38	167

=== Ladies ===
Rank	Name	Nation	CF	SP	FS	SP+FS	Points	Places
1	Suzie Brasher	United States	1	2	1	1	174.22	11
2	Garnet Ostermeier	West Germany	3	1	2	2	169.80	16
3	Tracy Solomons	United Kingdom	2	4	4	4	162.82	31
4	Christa Jorda	Austria	4	7	3	3	160.94	35
5	Shinobu Watanabe	Japan	7	3	6	5	156.68	47
6	Choo Young-soon	South Korea	5	5	8	8	151.66	60
7	Sanda Dubravčić	Yugoslavia	12	8	5	5	151.08	63
8	Renata Baierová	Czechoslovakia	11	6	7	7	148.08	70
9	Christine Eicher	Switzerland	6	9	10	10	147.46	72
10	Vicki Holland	Australia	15	11	9	9	135.20	94
11	Genevieve Schoumaker	Belgium	13	13	12	11	128.44	106
12	Sylvia Doulat	France	9	10	14	14	125.78	112
13	Irina Nichifolov	Romania	14	12	11	12	125.12	113
14	Herma van der Horst	Netherlands	10	14	13	13	127.26	115
15	Evelina Panova	Bulgaria	16	15	15	15	112.58	135

=== Pairs ===
Rank	Name	Nation	SP	FS	Points	Places
1	Sherri Baier / Robin Cowan	Canada	1	1	128.39	9
2	Lorene Mitchell / Donald Mitchell	United States	2	2	124.94	16
3	Elizabeth Cain / Peter Cain	Australia	4	3	116.67	33
4	Jana Bláhová / Luděk Feňo	Czechoslovakia	5	4	113,74	36
5	Sabine Fuchs / Xavier Videau	France	3	5	114.12	39
6	Karen Wood / Stephen Baker	United Kingdom	7	6	100.33	55
7	Catherine Brunet / Philippe Brunet	France	6	7	94.27	62

=== Ice dance ===
Rank	Name	Nation	CD	FD	Points	Places
1	Kathryn Winter / Nicholas Slater	United Kingdom	1	1	176.22	9
2	Denise Best / David Dagnell	United Kingdom	2	3	167.50	18
3	Martine Olivier / Yves Tarayre	France	4	2	162.96	31
4	Anne-Sophie Druet / Laurent Mazarguil	France	3	4	161.20	32
5	Claudia Koch / Roland Schranz	Austria	5	5	154.28	47
6	Manuela Masserenz / Roberto Pelizzola	Italy	6	6	149.42	52
7	Rossella Rossio / Carlo Pavesi	Italy	7	7	141.86	63
8	Sabine Köppe / Ernst Köppe	Austria	8	8	131.34	72

== Medal table ==
Rank	Nation	Gold	Silver	Bronze	Total
1	United States	2	1	0	3
2	Great Britain	1	1	1	3
3	Canada	1	0	1	2
4	Japan	0	1	0	1
4	West Germany	0	1	0	1
6	Australia	0	0	1	1
6	France	0	0	1	1
Totals (7 entries)		4	4	4	12
