= David McGillivray =

David McGillivray may refer to:

- David McGillivray (screenwriter) (born 1947), actor, producer, screenwriter and film critic
- David McGillivray (figure skater) (born 1949), Canadian figure skater
- Dave McGillivray, American race director; current director of the Boston Marathon
