= Jeffrey Langdon =

Canadian figure skater

Personal information
- Born: August 13, 1975 (age 50) Smiths Falls, Ontario
- Height: 1.75 m (5 ft 9 in)

Figure skating career
- Country: Canada
- Began skating: 1979
- Retired: 2001

Jeffrey Langdon (born August 13, 1975) is a Canadian former competitive figure skater. He is a two-time Canadian national medallist and represented Canada at the 1998 Winter Olympics, where he placed 12th. His highest placement at the World Championships was 8th, in 1998. A member of Rideau Lakes FSC, he was coached by Doug Leigh and Robert Tebby at the Mariposa School of Skating.

Following his competitive retirement in 2001, Langdon coached for four years in Waterloo, Ontario and then skated on Royal Caribbean International cruise ships for Willy Bietak Productions. In 2008, he settled in Calgary, Alberta, and joined the staff at the Calalta Community Figure Skating Club.

== Programs ==
Season	Short program	Free skating
1998–99		Tosca (The Academy of Plays Opera) by Giacomo Puccini

== Competitive highlights ==
GP: Champions Series / Grand Prix

International
Event	91–92	92–93	93–94	94–95	95–96	96–97	97–98	98–99	99–00	00–01
Olympics							12th			
Worlds						9th	8th			
GP Cup of Russia						6th		8th		
GP Skate America						12th				
GP Skate Canada							8th	8th		11th
Czech Skate					5th					
Finlandia Trophy									3rd	
Nebelhorn Trophy			1st							
Schäfer Memorial										2nd
Skate Canada				10th						
St. Gervais			3rd							
International: Junior
Junior Worlds	9th	5th	10th							
National
Canadian Champ.	2nd J	8th	8th		4th	2nd	3rd	7th	WD	10th
