= Figure skating competition =

Judged sports competition in figure skating

A figure skating competition is a judged sports competition in figure skating.

== Types of figure skating competitions ==
=== International ===
International competitions sanctioned by the International Skating Union (ISU) are governed by the union's rules. Skaters are entered by their respective national skating federations.

- ISU Championships: World, European, Four Continents, and World Junior Championships, as well as the World Synchronized Skating Championships.
- Figure skating at the Olympic Games
- Senior invitational international competitions, such as the ISU Grand Prix of Figure Skating.
- ISU Challenger Series such as Nebelhorn Trophy, Ondrej Nepela Memorial, and Finlandia Trophy, started in the 2014-15 season. ISU decided to support a restricted group of traditional B internationals.
- Other international competitions ("B internationals") such as Karl Schäfer Memorial and NRW Trophy. Results from these competitions are generally excluded from ISU season's best (SB) and personal best (PB) scores but may be considered for ranking.
- Junior international competitions such as the ISU Junior Grand Prix.
- Team events such as the ISU World Team Trophy in Figure Skating

=== National ===
National championships are held by individual national skating federations and governed by their domestic rules.

- Qualifying competitions for the national championships are held by some larger countries with many skaters.
- National championships in lower age or skill divisions, such as junior and novice, are held in some countries.

Results from national championships are excluded from SB and PB scores.

=== Other ===
Club competitions, also known as non-qualifying competitions, organized by a local figure skating club. These events have open entries and typically many age or test level divisions, and are sanctioned by, and conducted using the rules of, the national skating federation in the country where they are held. Skaters from other countries may enter these events with the permission of their own federation.

- ISI competitions are sanctioned by, and held using the rules of, the Ice Skating Institute instead of the national federation.
- Basic skills competitions are for low-level recreational skaters.

Made-for-television competitions in a variety of formats.

- Unsanctioned professional competitions, including events such as the World Professional Figure Skating Championships and Ice Wars, and reality television programs where participants compete in figure skating. Skaters who participate in these events become ineligible to compete in future sanctioned events.
- International pro-am and invitational events that are sanctioned by the ISU but typically using different competition formats than standard international competitions.
- Pro-am and invitational events that are sanctioned by a national federation, involving eligible skaters only from that country, again typically involving nonstandard rules and competition formats.

== How competitions are conducted ==
At an international or major national skating competitions, skaters in the same event are divided into groups for practice sessions before the competition. Because of safety concerns, there are usually no more than 6 singles skaters, 4 pair skating teams, or 5 ice dancing couples on the ice at the same time. After a warmup period, each skater's program music is played in turn. The other skaters must exit the ice while each skater performs their program. Skaters are usually given at least one "official" practice on the actual competition ice surface for each competition segment before the event, which allows them to orient themselves in the arena and check for any problems with the timing or sound quality of their music. Coaches are not permitted on the ice with their skaters at competition practices, and instead stand or sit behind the rink boards. At international competitions except for the Olympic Games, skaters are not permitted to skate except on the officially designated practice sessions once they have been credentialed at the competition.

The start order for the initial phase (short program or compulsory dance) of the competition has traditionally been determined by random draw, but at some competitions is now the reverse order of seeding or qualification placement. Again, skaters are divided into warmup groups. During the competition, each group of skaters takes the ice together for few minutes of warmup, then each skater performs their program alone on the ice. The skaters then wait off the ice in the kiss and cry area for their marks to be read, while volunteers (usually children) called sweepers collect any flowers or other gifts from the ice. There is usually a break to resurface the ice after every 2 groups. In the second and subsequent phases of the competition, the start orders and warmup groups are determined by current standings, with either a random draw within each group or competitors skating in reverse order of standing, depending on the rules of the particular competition.

As of 2007, all international and most national competitions use the ISU Judging System to determine competition results. The judges, event referee, and technical panel officials sit together on one side of the ice, close to the ice level. The referee is responsible for running the competition, such as signalling the announcer and music booth, timing the warmup periods, and resolving any issues involving accidents or disruptions. Accountants are responsible for tabulating the marks and competition results. At many competitions, there are also trial judges sitting in a group behind the working officials, who practice-judge the event in order to qualify for a judging appointment.

Following the competition, there may be a podium ceremony on the ice where medals, trophies, and flowers are awarded. Many competitions conclude with a gala or exhibition where the top finishers from each discipline, and sometimes invited skaters from the host country or club, perform show programs in a non-competitive setting.

Qualifying and club competitions usually follow similar procedures. At these events, because of the number of competitors, skaters may only get a brief practice without music on the competition ice surface. Particularly in the lower-level age or skill divisions, it is common to use closed judging to save time; in this case, the judges record each skater's marks after their performance, but the marks are not read, only posted at the conclusion of the competition. At competitions where there are a very large number of competitors, they may be divided into groups for a qualifying or initial round, from which the best-placed skaters from each group advance to the final round. At club competitions it is also very common for the short program and free skating to be held as separate events with separate entries. Podium ceremonies are usually held in an off-ice area, and there is rarely a gala.

Competitions in synchronized skating follow a somewhat modified procedure. Because of the impossibility of having more than one team on the ice at the same time, each team gets their own designated practice time before the competition, and a short warmup period immediately before their performance in which the team members usually file onto the ice and skate around in a choreographed formation to take up the opening position for their program. At synchronized skating competitions, the judges' stand is positioned high above the ice for better visibility of the formations, and there is a second referee at ice level responsible for dealing with accidents and safety issues.

== Qualifying competitions in the United States ==
The United States Figure Skating Association holds national championships in five skill divisions. From highest to lowest, these are:

- Senior (also known as Championship)
- Junior
- Novice
- Intermediate
- Juvenile

Unlike the International Skating Union, which categorizes novice, junior, and senior skaters by age, in the US these are test or skill levels. For example, a skater who competes in the junior division must have passed the junior skating test in that particular discipline, but not yet the senior test. In practice, the skills required to pass the tests are well below those that are required to be competitive at the corresponding level, and skaters choose which level to test based on the level they think they can compete at successfully, rather than vice versa.

As of 2012, only the US Figure Skating national championship stands. The US Figure Skating Junior national championship has been removed, and all skaters juvenile and above must advance through their respective sectional championship, whether it be Eastern, Midwestern, or Pacific Coast.

The qualifying season for juvenile skaters through senior skaters begins at one of nine regional championships, which are now typically held in the first half of October. The top four skaters from each regional advance to one of three sectional championships in November, from which the top four advance to the national championship in January. (Up until the 1990s, competitions were held later in the season, with regionals typically in November and sectionals often not until January.)

The regions and sections are:

Eastern section	Midwestern section	Pacific Coast section
New England region	Eastern Great Lakes region	Pacific Northwest region
North Atlantic region	Upper Great Lakes region	Central Pacific region
South Atlantic region	Southwestern region	Southwest Pacific region

Some skaters are also given "byes" through qualifying based on their results from the previous season's competitions, if they qualify for the Junior or Senior Grand Prix Final, or if they are assigned by the USFSA to international competitions that conflict with their qualifying competitions. Skaters are currently not eligible for byes at any level if they cannot compete in their qualifying competition due to injury or illness.

=== Synchronized skating ===
In the US, synchronized skating has its own competition track with the national championships and qualifying events held separately from those in the other disciplines. There are no regional championships in this discipline; teams qualify for the U.S. Synchronized Team Skating Championships at one of three sectional competitions.

=== Adult competition ===
Adults (skaters 21 and older) in the US have a separate competitive track which culminates in the U.S. Adult Figure Skating Championships (colloquially Adult Nationals). Most divisions at this competition are non-qualifying events with open entries, but there is also a more rigorous set of qualifying events called Championship events. Skaters must qualify for the Championship events through their respective adult sectional championship, which is held separately from standard-track sectionals.

Adult Sectionals are typically held in late February or early March, with Nationals occurring in mid-April.

== Qualifying competitions in Canada ==
Skate Canada organizes the annual Canadian Figure Skating Championships and the competitions leading up to them. The competition levels in Canada, from highest to lowest, are:

- Senior
- Junior
- Novice
- Pre-novice
- Juvenile

Canada's figure skating organization is divided into 13 sections which generally correspond to provincial boundaries. Sectional championships for singles, pair skating, and ice dancing are generally held in November. The top four finishers at each level advance to the next event.

Senior skaters qualify directly from sectionals to the Canadian Figure Skating Championships. As in the United States, top finishers from the previous year and skaters with conflicting international assignments receive byes to the national championships.

The top junior, novice, and pre-novice skaters from each sectional championship qualify to skate at either the Eastern or Western Challenge competitions. From the Challenge events, junior skaters qualify to skate at the Canadian Figure Skating Championships, while novice and pre-novice skaters qualify to skate at the Junior National Skating Championships, held separately from the national championship for juniors and seniors. Juveniles qualify directly from their sectional championships to the Junior National event.

Skate Canada runs two separate tracks for synchronized skating competitions. The "festival" or recreational track allows for smaller teams, no test requirements, and more lenient age groupings, to encourage as many clubs as possible to field teams. The elite competitive track comprises competition at the novice, junior, senior, and adult levels. The top 4 teams from each section qualify to compete at the Skate Canada Synchronized Nationals.

== Qualifying competitions in Japan ==
Competitions organized by the Japan Skating Federation begin with 6 block championships:

- Block 1: Northeast/Hokkaidō
- Block 2: Kantō region
- Block 3: Tokyo
- Block 4: Chūbu region
- Block 5: Kinki
- Block 6: Shikoku/Kyūshū

The block championships are held in October. In November, there are two regional championships—East Japanese and West Japanese—leading to the Japan Figure Skating Championships for senior-level skaters, which are usually held in December. National competitions for novice and junior competitors are held separately. In Japan, the levels follow the ISU age guidelines for junior and senior level competitors, so that skaters who are age-eligible for both ISU junior and senior events often compete in both national competitions. The national championships in synchronized skating are also held as a separate event.
