= Merinda–Pam Burridge collision =

Boating accident in Australia

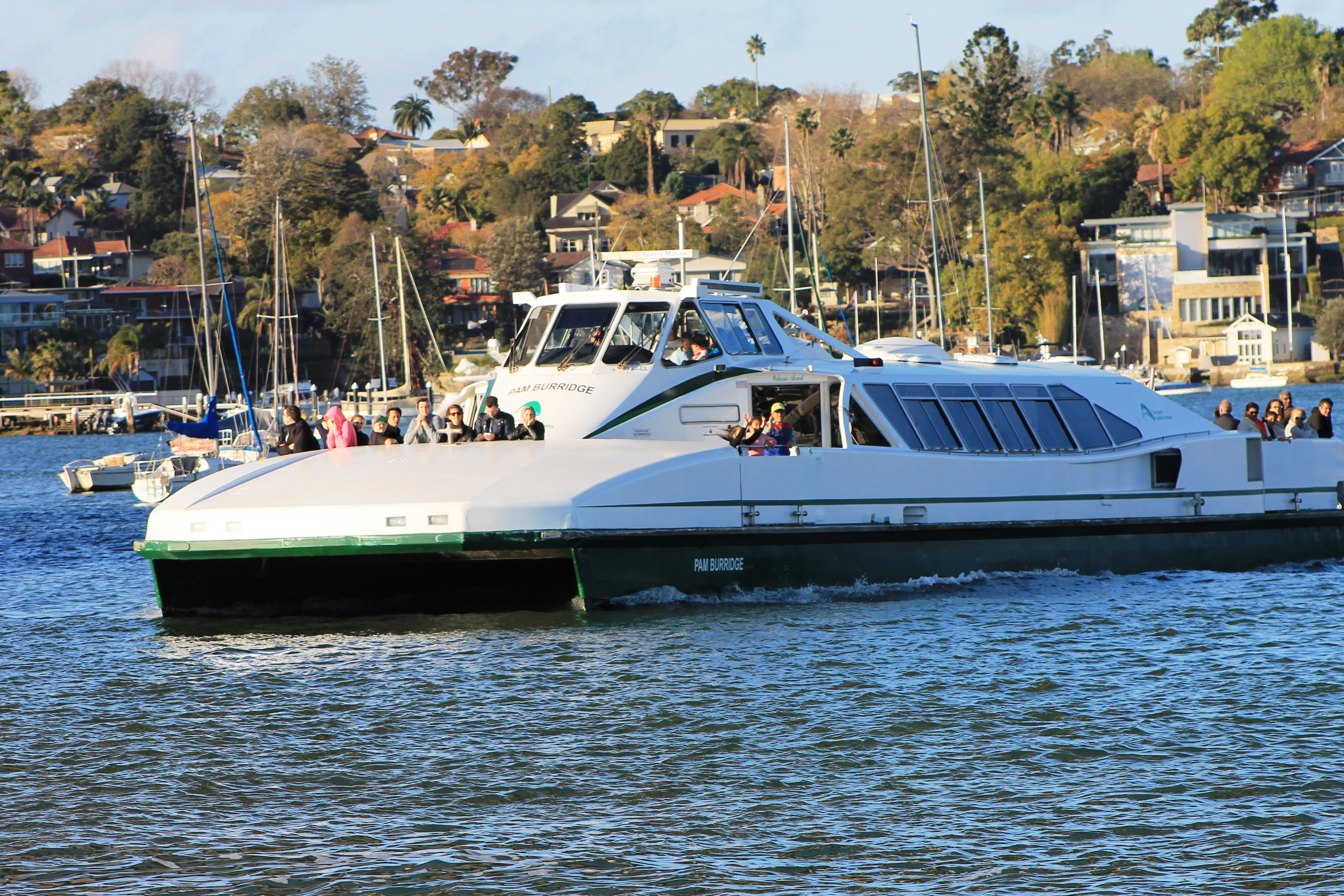
- HarbourCat Pam Burridge in 2015.
- Date: 28 March 2007
- Place: Sydney Harbour, Australia
- Vessels involved: • ML Merinda • Pam Burridge
- Cause: Failure of Merinda to adequately light itself during nighttime, resulting in collision
- Result: • Merinda destroyed • 4 aboard Merinda killed, 2 injured • Pam Burridge damaged

A collision between the private cruiser Merinda and the Sydney HarbourCat Pam Burridge, which occurred on 28 March 2007 near the Sydney Harbour Bridge, claimed the lives of four members of Australia's ice skating elite, and injured two other people. The skaters were on board the nine-metre motor cruiser Merinda to celebrate the national team's performance at 2009 World Figure Skating Championships.

== Description ==
Fourteen-year-old Morgan Innes, who had won the 2006 Queensland Intermediate Ladies Championship and was placed seventh at the 2006 Australian Championships in the novice ladies division, was killed along with ice skating judges Simone Moore and Alan Blinn, and 45-year-old Sydney man James Engert. They were on a sightseeing trip on the Merinda when the cabin cruiser collided with the Sydney Ferries Harbour Cat Pam Burridge just before 11 pm. Also injured in the crash was Innes's coach Liz Cain who represented Australia in the 1980 Winter Olympic Games; Cain's leg had to be amputated. Innes's body was missing for five days before it was discovered on 2 April by a police dive team 200 metres from the crash site.

In April 2007, Innes's parents established the Morgan Innes Foundation, which raises funds to help young ice skaters pursue their profession. In 2010, the International Olympic Committee banned the wearing of a yellow bracelet by Australian Olympic figure skater Cheltzie Lee to honour Innes, deeming the bracelet a sponsorship item. Lee had worn the bracelet since 2007 when she competed and trained, including international meets.
