= Ted Barton =

Canadian figure skater

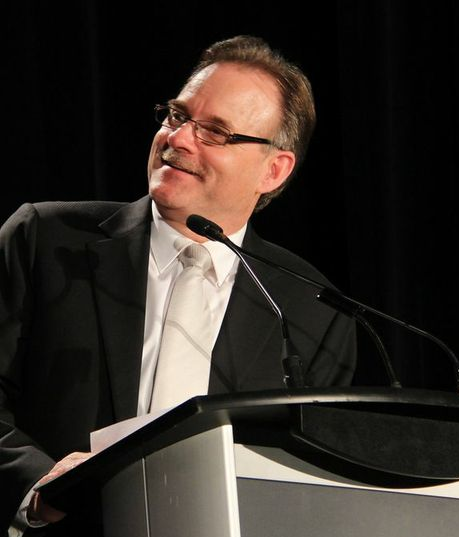

Personal information
- Born: c. 1955 Auckland, New Zealand

Figure skating career
- Country: Canada
- Skating club: Capilano WC

Ted Barton (born c. 1955) is a Canadian former competitive figure skater. He is the 1975 Nebelhorn Trophy champion and 1975 Grand Prix International St. Gervais silver medalist.

== Life and career ==
Barton was born in Auckland, New Zealand and moved to British Columbia, Canada, at an early age. During his competitive career, he was a member of Capilano WC. He became the 1970 Canadian novice men's silver medalist and 1973 national junior champion. In the 1975–76 season, he won gold at the Nebelhorn Trophy and silver at the Grand Prix International St. Gervais before competing at the 1976 World Championships in Gothenburg, Sweden.

Barton is the executive director of Skate Canada BC/Yukon Division. An instant replay system that he developed was adopted by the International Skating Union (ISU). He was inducted into British Columbia's Sports Hall of Fame in 2008.

The ISU also adopted Barton's proposal for streaming videos of the ISU Junior Grand Prix series. He provides commentary and interviews skaters for the series.

== Competitive highlights ==
| Event | 1970–71 | 1971–72 | 1972–73 | 1973–74 | 1974–75 | 1975–76 |
|---|---|---|---|---|---|---|
| World Championships | | | | | | 16th |
| International St. Gervais | | | | | | 2nd |
| Nebelhorn Trophy | | | | | | 1st |
| Canadian Championships | | | 10th | 7th | 4th | WD |
| Canadian Junior Championships | 5th J | 5th J | 1st J | | | |
