= Ben Ferreira =

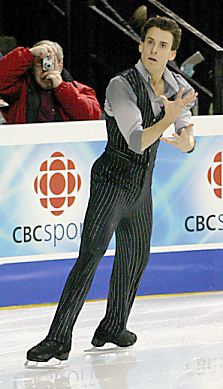

Personal information
- Born: April 5, 1979 (age 47) Vancouver, British Columbia
- Height: 1.78 m (5 ft 10 in)

Figure skating career
- Country: Canada
- Skating club: The Royal Glenora Club
- Retired: January 2006

Ben Ferreira (born April 5, 1979) is a Canadian former competitive figure skater. He is the 2004 Skate Canada International silver medallist, the 2004 Bofrost Cup on Ice silver medallist, and a three-time Canadian national medallist.

== Career ==
Ferreira placed 12th at the 1998 World Junior Championships.

In the 1999–2000 season, he won the bronze medal at the Canadian Championships. He placed tenth at the 2000 Four Continents and 19th at the 2000 World Championships in Nice, France.

In the 2000–01 season, Ferreira repeated as the Canadian national bronze medallist and went on to place ninth at the 2001 Four Continents. He was coached by Jan Ullmark at The Royal Glenora Club in Edmonton, Alberta.

In 2001–02, Ferreira placed fifth at the Canadian Championships and 15th at the 2002 World Championships. Michelle and Doug Leigh were his coaches.

In the 2002–03 season, he finished tenth at the 2002 Bofrost Cup on Ice and fourth at the Canadian Championships. He was coached by Doug Leigh at the Mariposa School of Skating in Barrie, Ontario.

Ferreira won silver at the 2004 Canadian Championships. He was seventh at the 2004 Four Continents and 13th at the 2004 World Championships. The following season, he won silver at the 2004 Skate Canada International and at the 2004 Bofrost Cup on Ice. After finishing off the podium at the Canadian Championships, he achieved his best ISU Championship result, fourth, at the 2005 Four Continents.

Ferreira placed eighth at the 2006 Canadian Championships. He retired from competition in January 2006. He currently coaches in Edmonton, Alberta.

== Personal life ==
Ferreira was born on April 5, 1979, in Vancouver, British Columbia. He married Jadene (née Fullen) on May 21, 2005. His ex-wife works as an international choreographer and choreographed for Ferreira during his competitive career. They are now officially divorced (2024).

== Programs ==
Season	Short program	Free skating
2005–06	Rodrigo Grassland Theme	The Untouchables by Ennio Morricone choreo. by David Wilson
2004–05	Rodrigo Grassland Theme	Sentimental Journey; Hit It; Moonlight Serenade; In the Mood by Glenn Miller
2003–04	Oh' But on the Third Day; The Majesty of the Blues Album by Winston Mursalis	The Untouchables by Ennio Morricone
2002–03	Oh' But on the Third Day; The Majesty of the Blues Album by Winston Mursalis	Durrango by Mark McKenzie
2001–02	Who's That Creepin' by Scotty Morris performed by Big Bad Voodoo Daddy	Mahatma (from the album Barrage); What's Going On; Mountain Spring by Dean Marshall
2000–01	The Messiah Will Come Again by R. Buchanan	Gangland Chase; Prelude by Peter Allan; Weeping Willows (from Charlie Chaplin soundtrack)

== Results ==
GP: Grand Prix, JGP: Junior Series (Junior Grand Prix)

International
Event	95–96	96–97	97–98	98–99	99–00	00–01	01–02	02–03	03–04	04–05	05–06
Worlds					19th		15th		13th		
Four Continents					10th	9th			7th	4th	
GP Cup of China											4th
GP Cup of Russia									7th		
GP NHK Trophy						7th			6th		6th
GP Skate America							8th			5th	
GP Skate Canada					7th	4th	9th			2nd	
GP Bofrost Cup								10th			
Bofrost Cup										2nd	
Finlandia Trophy				8th							
Golden Spin				5th							
International: Junior
Junior Worlds			12th								
JGP Slovakia			5th								
Blue Swords		8th J									
Orex Cup	1st J										
St. Gervais		8th J									
National
Canadian Champ.	3rd J	7th	6th	5th	3rd	3rd	5th	4th	2nd	4th	8th
Levels: N = Novice; J = Junior
