= Elizabeth Cain =

Australian pair skater and coach

Personal information
- Full name: Elizabeth Jane Cain
- Born: 29 December 1962 (age 63) Sydney

Figure skating career
- Country: Australia

Elizabeth Jane "Liz" Cain (born 29 December 1962) is an Australian former pair skater and current figure skating coach. With brother Peter Cain, she is the 1976 World Junior bronze medalist and four time Australian national champion. Their highest placement at the World Figure Skating Championships was 12th, in 1977. They competed in the 1980 Winter Olympics, finishing eleventh. She is the mother and coach of Australian national champion Sean Carlow.

On 28 March 2007, Cain and several members of the Australian figure skating team were in a small boat on Sydney Harbour near the Harbour Bridge when it collided with a ferry. Cain lost her leg in the accident, which has become known as the Sydney Harbour fatal ferry crash. However, her life was saved by her son, who jumped into the water and held her until rescuers could arrive. She has since returned to coaching. Due to her accident, she wears a prosthetic leg.

== Results ==
(with Cain)

International
Event	75-76	76-77	77-78	78-79	79-80
Olympics					11th
Worlds		12th	14th	13th	14th
International: Junior
Junior Worlds	3rd				
National
Australian Champ.	1st	1st	1st		1st
British Champ.	3rd				
J = Junior level
