= Perforated ulcer =

- Other names: Ruptured ulcer
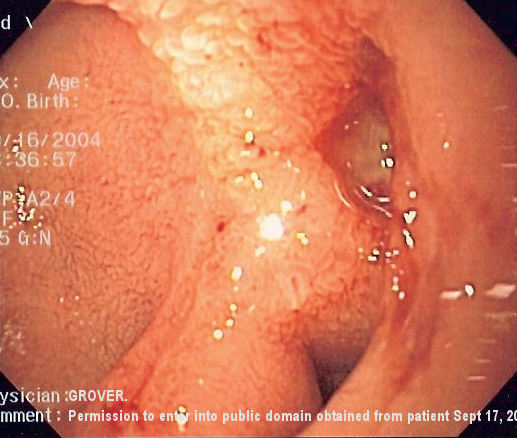
- Endoscopic image of a posterior wall duodenal ulcer with a clean base, which is a common cause of upper gastrointestinal hemorrhage and could potentially lead to perforation.
- Specialty: Gastroenterology
- Symptoms: Abdominal pain, vomiting, nausea
- Complications: Bowel perforation, sepsis, gastrointestinal hemorrhage
- Usual onset: Sudden
- Risk factors: Untreated peptic ulcer
- Treatment: Immediate surgery

A perforated ulcer is a condition in which an untreated ulcer has burned through the mucosal wall in a segment of the gastrointestinal tract (e.g., the stomach or colon) allowing gastric contents to leak into the abdominal cavity.

== Signs and symptoms ==
A perforated ulcer can be grouped into a stercoral perforation, which involves a number of different things that cause perforation of the intestine wall.

The first symptom of a perforated peptic ulcer is usually sudden, severe, sharp pain in the abdomen. The pain is typically at its maximum immediately and persists. It is characteristically made worse by any movement, and greatly intensifies with coughing or sneezing.

== Causes ==
Causes include H. Pylori, alcohol, smoking, consuming highly acidic foods and beverages (such as coffee), and nonsteroidal anti-inflammatory drugs (NSAIDs).

== Diagnosis ==
This ulcer is known as a peptic ulcer before it burns through the full thickness of the stomach or duodenal wall. A diagnosis is made by taking an erect abdominal/chest X-ray (seeking air under the diaphragm). This is one of the few modern occasions where surgery is undertaken to treat an ulcer. Many perforated ulcers have been attributed to the bacterium Helicobacter pylori.

== Treatment ==
Treatment generally requires immediate surgery.

== Prognosis ==
Perforated peptic ulcer is a serious condition with an overall reported mortality of 5%–25%, rising to as high as 50% with age. The incidence of perforated ulcer is steadily declining, though there are still incidents where it occurs.

== Notable cases ==
1892 saw the first time anyone survived surgery for a perforated peptic (stomach) ulcer.

- Richard Pankhurst (1835–1897, aged 62) had a perforated ulcer and died on 5 July 1897.
- Thomas Preston (1860–1900, aged 39 or 40) had a perforated ulcer and died in 1900.
- Rudolph Valentino (1895–1926, aged 31) had a perforated ulcer and died on August 23, 1926.
- Rudyard Kipling (1865–1936, aged 70) died of perforated duodenal ulcer on 18 January 1936.
- James Joyce (1882–1941, aged 58) had a perforated ulcer and died on January 13, 1941, in Zürich.
- Guy Rochon Owen (1913–1952, aged 38) had a perforated ulcer, and died on April 21, 1952.
- Charlie Parker (1920–1955, aged 34) had a perforated ulcer, and died on March 12, 1955.
- Albert Blithe (1923–1967, aged 44) had a perforated ulcer and died on December 17, 1967.
- Pavel Belyayev (1925—1970, aged 44) had a perforated duodenal ulcer that progressed to peritonitis following surgical complications, and died on January 10, 1970.
- Gene Vincent (1935–1971, aged 36) had a ruptured stomach ulcer and died on October 12, 1971.
- J. R. R. Tolkien (1892–1973, aged 81) had a perforated ulcer and died on September 2, 1973.
- Count Dante (1939–1975, aged 36) died of internal hemorrhaging caused by a bleeding ulcer, on May 25, 1975.
- Ian Hendry (1931—1984, aged 53) died of a stomach haemorrhage in London.
- Gene Clark (1944–1991, aged 46) had perforated ulcer and died on May 24, 1991.
- Doug Hepburn (1926–2000, aged 74) had a perforated ulcer and died on November 22, 2000.
- Philip Agee (1935–2008, aged 72) had a perforated ulcer and died on January 7, 2008.
- Barbara Bush (1925–2018, aged 92) was treated for a perforated ulcer in November 2008.
- Tara Palmer-Tomkinson (1971–2017, aged 45) had a perforated ulcer and died on February 8, 2017.
- Steve Wright (1954–2024, aged 69) died from a stomach ulcer rupture on 12 February 2024.
