= Kathryn Winter =

British ice dancer

Figure skating career
- Partner: Nicholas Slater

Kathryn Winter is a British ice dancer. She won the 1976 World Junior Figure Skating Championships in ice dancing with partner Nicholas Slater.
