= Melville Rogers =

Canadian figure skater

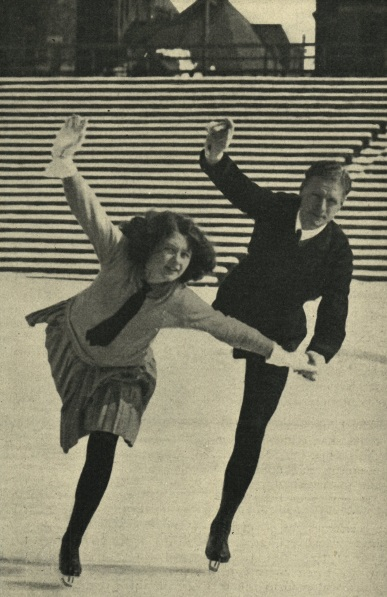
- Cecil Smith and Melville Rogers

Personal information
- Full name: Melville F. Rogers
- Born: January 5, 1899 Ottawa, Ontario, Canada
- Died: September 26, 1973 (aged 74) Ottawa, Ontario, Canada

Figure skating career
- Partner: Gladys Rogers; Isobel (Blyth) Rogers; Cecil Smith; Jeanette Rathbun
- Skating club: Minto Skating Club; Toronto Skating Club
Medal record
Representing Canada
Fours' Figure skating
North American Championships
Gold medal – first place	1937 Boston	Fours
Gold medal – first place	1935 Montreal	Fours
Gold medal – first place	1933 New York	Fours
Gold medal – first place	1931 Ottawa	Fours

Melville F. Rogers (January 5, 1899 – September 26, 1973) was a Canadian figure skater and figure skating judge. He competed in the disciplines of single skating, pair skating, ice dancing, and fours. He won the Canadian championship several times.

== Personal life ==
Melville Falkner Rogers, son of Amos Frankford Rogers and Margaret Rebecca Falkner, was born in Ottawa, January 5, 1899 (Ontario birth registrations). Melville's siblings included Frankford Ernest Rogers (born April 20, 1897) and Gladys Margaret Rogers (born June 1, 1903). In Ottawa on March 5, 1927, Melville married Isobel Hossack Blyth, daughter of James Thorp Blyth and Isabella Evans Thomson (Ontario marriage registration). According to that marriage registration, Melville was a lawyer. Melville and Isobel (1904–1968) are buried in the Beechwood Cemetery, section 49, lot 44 (Beechwood Cemetery burial registers).

== Skating career ==
=== National level ===
As a single skater, he won the Canadian Figure Skating Championships in 1923 and from 1925 to 1928.

As a pair skater, he won the silver medal at the 1922 Canadian Championships and the bronze medal at the 1923 Canadian Championships with partner Cecil Smith. During those years, he represented the Toronto Skate Club in competition. He won the 1925 Canadian Championships, the silver medal at the 1928 Championships, and the bronze medal at the 1929 Championships with Gladys Rogers, representing the Minto Skating Club. He won the bronze medal at the 1926 Canadian Championships with partner Isobel Blyth, whom he married in 1927 (Ontario marriage registration 1927 009200).

As an ice dancer, he won the silver medal at the 1940 Canadian Championships with Elmore Davis. They also won the Junior national title that same year.

In the fours discipline, he won the 1922 Canadian fours silver medal with partners Sidney Pepler, Frankford Rogers, and Katherine Capreol. He won the 1929 Canadian fours silver medal with partners Frances Claudet, Katherine Lopdell, and Guy Owen. He won the 1931 Canadian fours bronze medal with the same team as in 1929. He won the 1932 Canadian fours silver medal with partners Elmore Davis, Prudence Holbrook and Guy Owen. He won the 1933, 1934, 1935, 1936, and 1937 Canadian fours title with the same team as in 1932.

=== Internationally ===
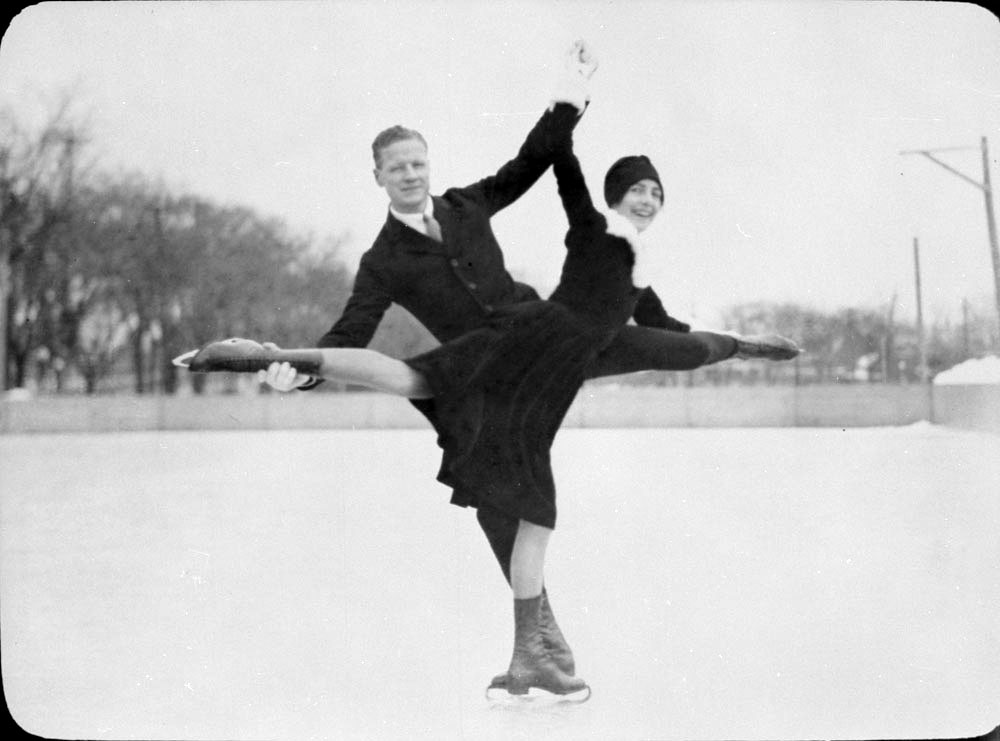
Melville and Isobel Rogers in 1927

He competed at the 1924 Winter Olympics as both a single skater and a pair skater. He placed 7th in singles, and 7th in pairs with partner Cecil Smith. At those Olympics, Rogers became the first Canadian men's singles skater to compete at the Olympics and was also a member of the first Canadian pairs team to compete at the Olympics.

He won the North American singles title in 1925 and 1927. He won the 1925 silver medal in pairs with Gladys Rogers. He won the fours title in 1933, 1935, and 1937 with Margaret Davis, Prudence Holbrook, and Guy Owen.

He also competed in pairs with Isobel Rogers, formerly Isobel Blyth. They placed 5th at the 1930 World Figure Skating Championships

== Results ==
=== Men's singles ===
Event	1920	1921	1922	1923	1924	1925	1926	1927	1928
Winter Olympics					7th				
North American Championships				2nd		1st		1st	
Canadian Championships	3rd	3rd	2nd	1st		1st	1st	1st	1st

=== Pairs ===
(with Rathbun)

Event	1922
Canadian Championships	2nd

(with Smith)

Event	1923	1924
Winter Olympics		7th
Canadian Championships	3rd	

(with Rogers)

Event	1925	1928	1929
North American Championships	2nd		
Canadian Championships	1st	2nd	3rd

(with Blyth)

Event	1926
Canadian Championships	3rd

=== Fours ===
(with Margaret Davis, Prudence Holbrook, and Guy Owen)

Event	1933	1935	1937
North American Championships	1st	1st	1st

(with Frances Claudet, Kathleen Lopdell, and Guy Owen)

Event	1931
North American Championships	1st

== Professional career ==
Following his retirement from competitive skating, he worked as a judge. He served as the president of the Canadian Figure Skating Association for two terms and remained active with the Minto Skating Club for many years.

He was posthumously inducted into the Canadian Figure Skating Hall of Fame in 1991.
