= Chauncey Bangs =

Canadian figure skater

Personal information
- Born: February 28, 1901 Ottawa, Ontario, Canada
- Died: February 18, 1952 (aged 50)

Figure skating career
- Country: Canada
- Partner: Frances Claudet; Marion McDougall (former)
Medal record
Representing Canada
Pairs Figure skating
North American Championships
Silver medal – second place	1931 Ottawa	Pairs
Gold medal – first place	1927 Toronto	Pairs

Chauncey Robert Bangs (February 28, 1901 – February 18, 1952) was a Canadian pair skater. He was born in Ottawa, Ontario. With partner Marion McDougall, he won the gold medal at the Canadian Figure Skating Championships in 1927 and 1928. He later paired with Frances Claudet, capturing the 1931 Canadian title. The duo finished sixth at the 1932 Winter Olympic Games and fifth at that year's World Figure Skating Championships.

== Results ==
(with Frances Claudet)

Event	1931	1932
Winter Olympic Games		6th
World Championships		5th
North American Championships	2nd	
Canadian Championships	1st	2nd

(with Marion McDougall)

Event	1926	1927	1928
North American Championships		1st	
Canadian Championships	2nd	1st	1st
