= Steven Cousins =

British figure skater

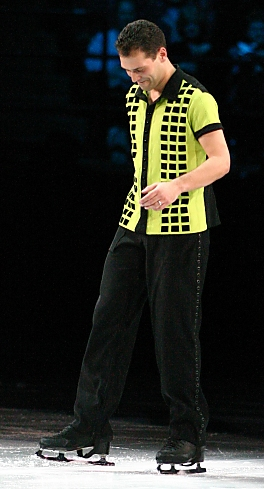
- Steven Cousins performs in 2004.

Personal information
- Born: 24 May 1972 (age 54) Chester, England
- Height: 1.80 m (5 ft 11 in)

Figure skating career
- Country: Great Britain
- Began skating: 1978
- Retired: 1998

Steven Cousins (born 24 May 1972) is a British former competitive men's singles figure skater. He is the 1993 Skate Canada International bronze medalist and an eight-time British national champion. He finished as high as 6th at the Olympics (1998), 7th at the World Championships (1998), and 4th at the European Championships (1996).

== Career ==
Cousins began skating in 1978 after he and his brother pushed their parents to take them to an ice rink. Although he had a negative reaction at first ("We ended up going to the rink, and I hated it"), he eventually grew interested in figuring out how to jump and spin. He was also spurred on by sibling rivalry with his elder brother.

Cousins is the youngest skater to win the British National Championships. He trained with Donna Gately at Deeside Ice Rink in the United Kingdom and then moved to the United States where he spent a number of years. In 1993, he moved to Canada and was coached by Doug Leigh at the Mariposa School of Skating in Barrie, Ontario. He also worked with Stephen Pickavance and Karen Barber in the UK.

Cousins competed at three Winter Olympics, nine World Championships, and nine European Championships during his career. He became the first Briton to land a triple Axel in competition at the 1994 Winter Olympics in Lillehammer, Norway. He was the British national champion for seven consecutive years before his streak was interrupted by Neil Wilson in the 1996–97 season. Cousins finished higher at the 1997 European Championships and was sent to the 1997 World Championships.

Cousins reclaimed his national title in the 1997–98 season. After finishing ninth at the 1997 Nations Cup, he withdrew from the 1997 Trophée Lalique. He placed sixth at the 1998 Winter Olympics in Nagano, Japan. He was coached by Doug Leigh and Robert Tebby.

Cousins retired from eligible competition in 1998 but continued to skate in shows, including touring with Stars on Ice until 2007. He has worked as a choreographer. In May 2010, he joined the International Skating School at Planet Ice, Coventry, and Silver Blades, Altrincham. He was the event manager for the 2012–13 Disson skating shows.

== Personal life ==
Cousins was born on 24 May 1972 in Chester, England. He married Canadian ice dancer Kristina Lenko in June 2003. They formally separated in the summer of 2006 and subsequently divorced. With former wife Elena Berezhnaya, he has two children. The couple's separation was confirmed in August 2013.

Cousins has a home in Chester but lives more than half the year in Ontario, Canada.

== Programmes ==
Season	Short programme	Free skating
1997–98		Gone with the Wind by Max Steiner and his Orchestra choreo. by Stephanie Grosscup
1996–97		
1995–96		
1994–95		
1993–94		Chariots of Fire by Vangelis
1992–93		
1991–92		

== Competitive highlights ==
GP: Champions Series (Grand Prix)

International
Event	86–87	88–89	89–90	90–91	91–92	92–93	93–94	94–95	95–96	96–97	97–98
Olympics					12th		9th				6th
Worlds			18th	16th	16th	18th	10th	8th	15th	11th	7th
Europeans			15th	8th	7th	9th	11th	8th	4th	11th	6th
GP Cup of Russia										8th	
GP Lalique											WD
GP Nations Cup											9th
GP NHK Trophy									5th		
GP Skate Canada									5th	4th	
Goodwill Games											9th
Int. de Paris					7th						
Nations Cup				8th		6th					
Nebelhorn Trophy			10th								
Piruetten							10th				
Skate America				12th	7th						
Skate Canada					5th		3rd				
Skate Electric		7th	7th								
St. Gervais			10th								
International: Junior
Junior Worlds	19th	12th	9th								
PFSA Trophy		5th J									
National
British Champ.			1st	1st	1st	1st	1st	1st	1st	2nd	1st
J: Junior level; WD: Withdrew
