= Becky Cosford =

Canadian pair skater

Personal information
- Born: August 25, 1986 (age 40)

Figure skating career
- Country: Canada
- Partner: Brian Shales
- Coach: Kris Wirtz, Kristy Wirtz

Becky Cosford (born August 25, 1986) is a Canadian pair skater. With partner Brian Shales, she is the 2007 Ondrej Nepela Memorial silver medalist. They teamed up in 2007.

== Career ==
Cosford originally competed as a singles skater. She competed nationally up to the junior level through 2004, when she switched full-time to pairs. Her first pairs partner was Kevin Maguire, with whom she competed in the 2003-2004 season and placed 11th in senior pairs at the 2004 Canadian Figure Skating Championships, where she also competed in the junior ladies division.

Her partnership with Maguire ended following that season and she teamed up with Christopher Richardson. Together, they were the 2005 Canadian junior silver medalists. Cosford competed with Richardson during the 2004-2005 and 2005-2006 seasons.
