= Linda Ann Ward =

Canadian former pair skater (born 1947)

Personal information
- Born: May 24, 1947 (age 79) Puslinch, Ontario

Figure skating career
- Country: Canada
- Partner: Neil Carpenter
- Retired: c. 1964

Linda Ann Ward (born May 24, 1947 in Puslinch, Ontario) is a Canadian former pair skater. With partner Neil Carpenter, she won a bronze medal at the Canadian Figure Skating Championships in 1963, captured a silver the following year, and competed at the 1964 Winter Olympics.

== Results ==
pairs with Carpenter

International
Event	1962	1963	1964
Winter Olympics			15th
World Championships		11th	
National
Canadian Championships		3rd	2nd
Canadian Junior Championships	2nd	1st	
