= Neil Carpenter =

Canadian pair skater

Personal information
- Born: September 17, 1944 (age 81) Galt, Ontario

Figure skating career
- Country: Canada
- Partner: Linda Ann Ward
- Retired: c. 1964

Neil B. Carpenter (born September 17, 1944 in Galt, Ontario) is a Canadian former pair skater. With partner Linda Ann Ward, he won a bronze medal at the Canadian Figure Skating Championships in 1963, captured a silver the following year, and competed at the 1964 Winter Olympics.

Carpenter was the head coach at the Hamilton Skating Club in Hamilton, Ontario. In August 2007, he signed a three-year contract to serve as head coach and head of skater development for the Dutch national team.

== Results ==
pairs with Linda Ann Ward

International
Event	1962	1963	1964
Winter Olympics			15th
World Championships		11th	
National
Canadian Championships		3rd	2nd
Canadian Junior Championships	2nd	1st	
