= Mary Petrie =

Canadian pair skater

Personal information
- Born: September 23, 1951 (age 74)

Figure skating career
- Country: Canada
Medal record
Representing Canada
Pairs' Figure skating
North American Championships
| Bronze medal – third place | 1969 Oakland | Pairs |

Mary Petrie (born September 23, 1951) is a Canadian former pair skater. With Robert McAvoy, she twice won the silver medal at the Canadian Figure Skating Championships. She later became partners with John Hubbell, and with him, she added another pair of silver medals at nationals and competed at the 1972 Winter Olympics.

== Results ==
pairs with John Hubbell

| Event | 1971 | 1972 |
|---|---|---|
| Winter Olympic Games | | 15th |
| World Championships | | 11th |
| Canadian Championships | 2nd | 2nd |

pairs with Robert McAvoy

| Event | 1967 | 1968 | 1969 | 1970 |
|---|---|---|---|---|
| World Championships | | | | 15th |
| North American Championships | | | 3rd | |
| Canadian Championships | | | 2nd | 2nd |
| Canadian Junior Championships | 2nd | 2nd | 1st | |

Ladies' singles

| Event | 1969 |
|---|---|
| Canadian Championships | 1st J |
