= Jane Kirby =

Canadian figure skater

Figure skating career
- Country: Canada
Medal record
Representing Canada
Pairs' Figure skating
North American Championships
Bronze medal – third place	1951 Calgary	Pairs

Jane Kirby was a Canadian figure skater who was the ladies gold medallist in the 1951 Canadian Figure Skating Championships. She and her partner Donald Tobin were bronze medallists in the pairs competition in the 1951 Canadian Figure Skating Championships and North American Figure Skating Championships. She later turned professional and skated with the Ice Capades.

== Results ==
ladies singles

Event	1950	1951	1952
Canadian Championships	3rd J	3rd	7th

pairs with Tobin

Event	1948	1950	1951
North American Championships			3rd
Canadian Championships	2nd J	1st J	1st
