= Marlene Smith (figure skater) =

Canadian figure skater

Personal information
- Full name: Marlene Elizabeth Smith
- Born: August 3, 1931 Niagara Falls, Ontario, Canada
- Died: March 1, 2009 (aged 77) United States

Figure skating career
- Country: Canada
- Partner: Donald Gilchrist
- Retired: c. 1952
Medal record
Representing Canada
Figure skating: Ladies' singles
North American Championships
Silver medal – second place	1949 Philadelphia	Ladies' singles
Figure skating: Pairs
North American Championships
Silver medal – second place	1949 Philadelphia	Pairs

Marlene Elizabeth Smith (August 3, 1931 – March 1, 2009) was a Canadian figure skater who competed in both pairs and ladies' singles. As a pair skater with Donald Gilchrist, she became the 1949 North American silver medallist and a two-time Canadian national champion (1949–1950). As a singles skater, she is the 1949 North American silver medallist and 1952 national champion. She competed at the 1952 Winter Olympics.

== Results ==
=== Ladies' singles ===
International
Event	1946	1947	1948	1949	1950	1951	1952
Winter Olympics							9th
World Championships					9th		7th
North American Championships				2nd			
National
Canadian Championships			3rd	4th	2nd		1st
Canadian Junior Championships	3rd	2nd	1st				

=== Pairs with Gilchrist ===
International
Event	1949	1950
World Championships		7th
North American Championships	2nd	
National
Canadian Championships	1st	1st
