= Audrey Garland =

Canadian figure skater

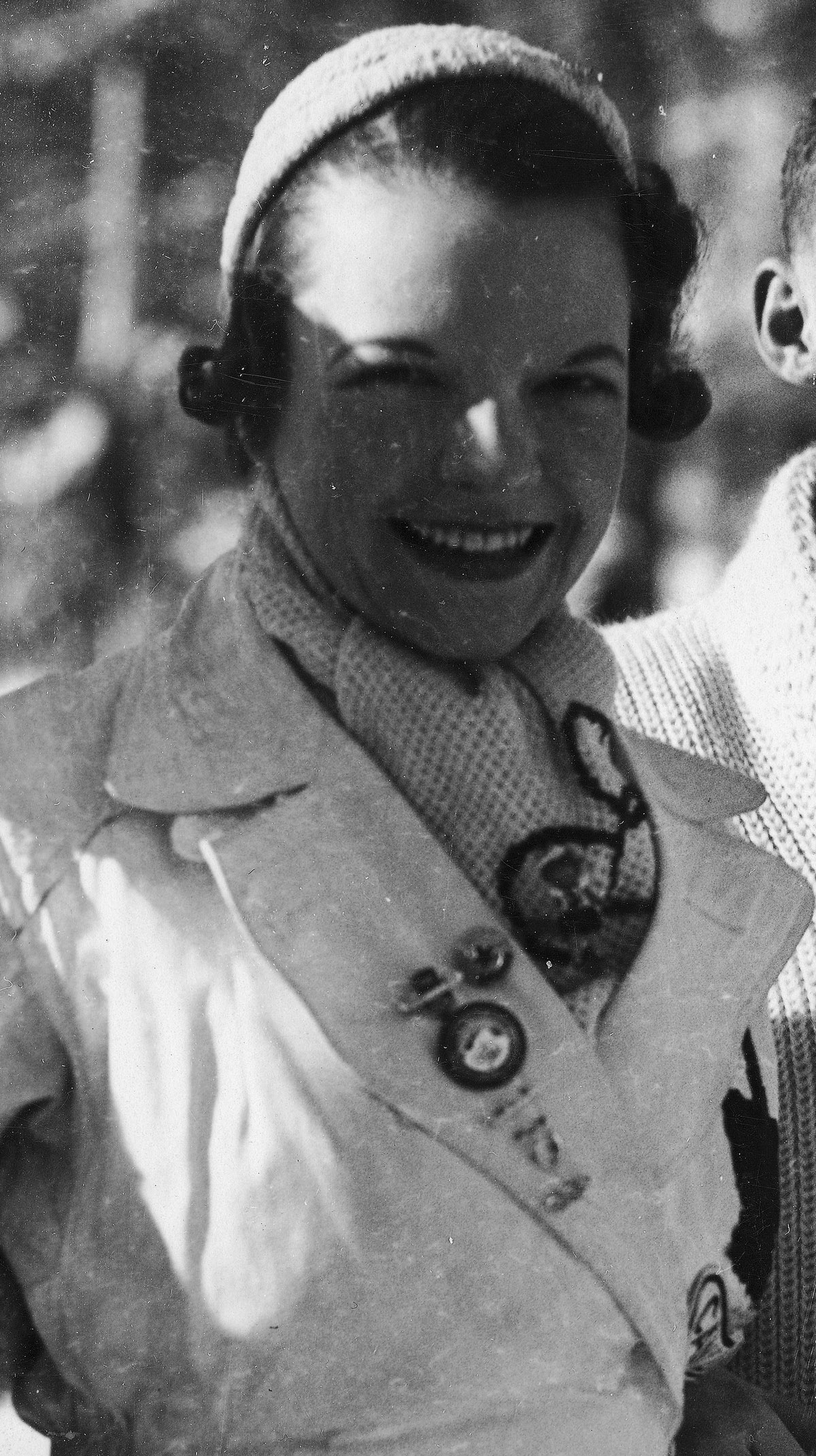
- Garland at the 1936 Winter Olympics

Personal information
- Born: December 24, 1912
- Died: February 4, 1969 (aged 56)

Figure skating career
- Country: Canada
- Discipline: Pair skating
- Partner: Fraser Sweatman

Audrey Jean Garland, later Wray (December 24, 1912 – February 4, 1969), was a Canadian pair skater. With partner Fraser Sweatman, she won the silver medal at the Canadian Figure Skating Championships in 1935 and competed in the 1936 Winter Olympics.

== Results ==
Pairs (with Sweatman)

Event	1934	1935	1936
Winter Olympic Games			12th
Canadian Championships	1st J	2nd	
