= Mariposa School of Skating =

- Formation: 1973
- Headquarters: Barrie Molson Centre; Allandale Recreation Center
- Location: Barrie, Ontario, Canada
- Director: Doug Leigh
- Coaches: Doug Leigh; Lee Barkell; David Islam
- Website: www.skatemariposa.com

The Mariposa School of Skating is a figure skating training centre in Barrie, Ontario, Canada.

== History ==
The school was founded in Orillia, Ontario in 1973 by Doug Leigh and Tom Harrison. The school moved to Barrie in 1988 after the Orillia city council refused to allow the building of a new rink on land to be donated to the school by Georgian College.

The head coaches at Mariposa are Leigh for singles, Lee Barkell for pairs, and David Islam for ice dancing. Islam and Paul Matheson were scheduled to become the co-owners in June 2017.

The name "Mariposa", which means "butterfly" in Spanish, refers to author Stephen Leacock's fictional name for Orillia, the school's original home.

== Notable students and alumni ==
- Jeffrey Buttle
- Steven Cousins
- Meagan Duhamel
- Ben Ferreira
- Oula Jaaskelainen
- Tuğba Karademir
- Christopher Mabee
- Nobunari Oda
- Brian Orser
- Elvis Stojko

== See also ==
- BC Centre of Excellence
