= Barbara Gratton =

Canadian figure skater

Figure skating career
- Country: Canada
- Skating club: Toronto SC
Medal record
Representing Canada
Figure skating: Ladies' singles
North American Championships
Bronze medal – third place	1953 Cleveland	Ladies' singles

Barbara Gratton is a Canadian former figure skater who competed in ladies' singles. She is the 1953 North American bronze medalist and a two-time (1953 and 1954) Canadian national champion. She was a member of Toronto SC.

== Results ==
International
Event	1949	1950	1951	1952	1953	1954
World Championships						4th
North American Champ.					3rd	
National
Canadian Championships	2nd J	1st J	4th	4th	1st	1st
J: Junior level
