= Gary Beacom =

Canadian figure skater

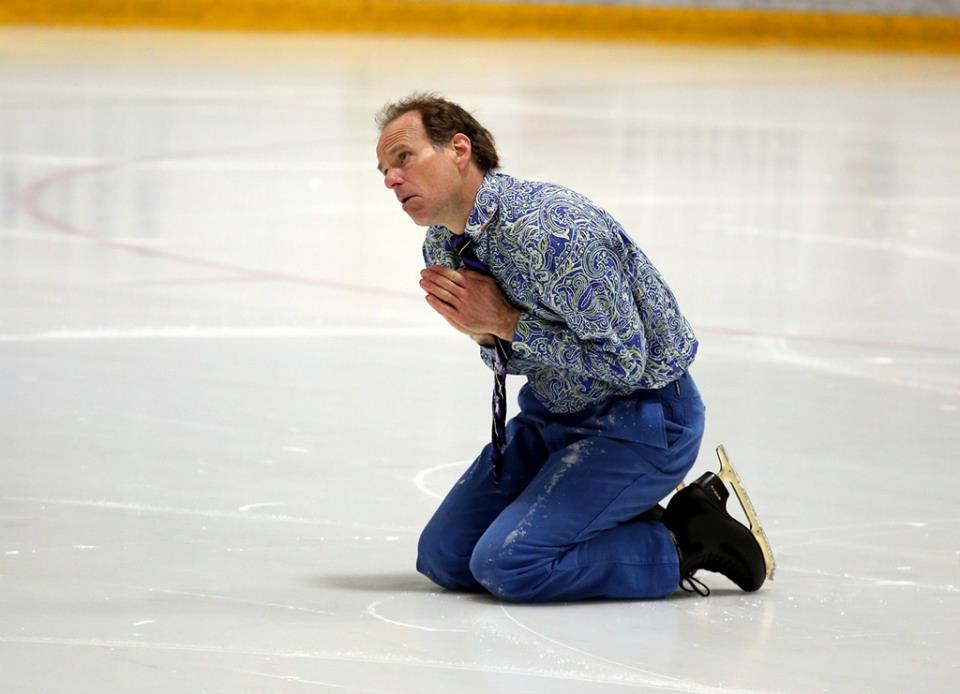
- Gary Beacom

Personal information
- Born: February 23, 1960 (age 66) Calgary, Alberta, Canada

Figure skating career
- Country: Canada
- Retired: 1985

Gary Beacom (born February 23, 1960) is a Canadian figure skater, choreographer and author. He is the 1983 and 1984 Canadian silver medalist and finished 11th at the 1984 Winter Olympics. Beacom won the 2016 World Figure Championship on black ice held in Toronto, Ontario and became the first Canadian to win the title with World Figure Sport. He expanded the knowledge and art of skating with his epic Creative Figure now called the Beacom Blossom in his honor.

== Career ==
Beacom began skating at the age of six. In 1983 and 1984, he won the silver medal at the Canadian Championships behind Brian Orser. He finished 11th at the 1984 Winter Olympics in Sarajevo and 10th at the 1984 World Championships. In the latter part of his amateur competitive career, he coached himself while studying full-time for a university degree.

Beacom approached his free skating programs "as an experiment in physical properties" and explored, in his skating, potentials for movements on the ice with figure skates. He developed unique movements, including different types of changes in weight and reversals than traditional skating movements. He executed unusual entries into spins and double and triple jumps. His programs included a greater variety of jumps with unusual take-offs, which were often intentionally landed on two feet, unique spin positions that demonstrated difficult balance and control, and "complex passages of edge and footwork impossible for anyone else to duplicate". Ellyn Kestnbaum states that Beacom approached skating as a scientific endeavor and valued "the process of exploration" over the aesthetic value of his skating.

In his professional career, Beacom specialized in unusual moves, notably in his performance to Leonard Cohen's "I'm Your Man". He won the 1988 World Professional Championships. Beacom trains figure skaters and competes at ISU adult competitions.

In 2016, Beacom returned to world class competition. His skating was epic at the 2016 World Figure Championship on black ice held in Toronto, Ontario. Beacom became the first Canadian to win the 2016 World Figure Championship title with World Figure Sport. He expanded the knowledge and art of skating with his unforgettable Creative Figure now called the Beacom Blossom in his honor.

As of 2017, he organized Gary Beacom Blade Master Seminars. He has performed his program to "I'm Your Man" more than 300 times all over the world. He has worked as a choreographer based in Oberstdorf, Germany and Tokyo, Japan.

== Personal life ==
Beacom graduated from the University of Toronto in 1984 with a Bachelor of Science in physics and philosophy.

As a Canadian citizen, Beacom protested against United States income tax. In 2003, he wrote a book about this, titled Apology.

== Competitive highlights ==
International
Event	74-75	75–76	76–77	77-78	78–79	79–80	80–81	81–82	82–83	83–84	84–85
Winter Olympics										11th	
World Champ.									13th	10th	
Skate America								6th			
Skate Canada							9th				7th
Moscow News									5th	2nd	
Nebelhorn Trophy					3rd						
Prague Skate				4th							
St. Gervais					3rd						
National
Canadian Champ.	3rd J	2nd J	1st J		4th	3rd			2nd	2nd	
