= Christopher Mabee =

Canadian figure skater

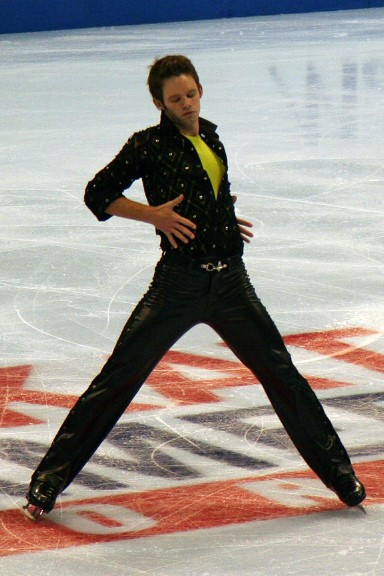
- Mabee competing in 2006

Personal information
- Full name: Christopher Mabee
- Born: August 26, 1985 (age 41) Tillsonburg, Ontario
- Height: 1.75 m (5 ft 9 in)

Figure skating career
- Country: Canada
- Discipline: Men's singles
- Skating club: Tillsonburg SC
- Retired: December 10, 2008
Medal record
Men's Figure skating
Representing Canada
Four Continents Championships
| Silver medal – second place | 2002 Jeonju | Men's singles |
Junior Grand Prix Final
| Bronze medal – third place | 2003–04 Malmö | Men's singles |

Christopher Mabee (born August 26, 1985) is a Canadian retired competitive figure skater. He is the 2007 Canadian national silver medalist. He announced his retirement from competitive skating in December, 2008.

== Early career ==
Christopher Mabee was born in Tillsonburg, Ontario. He began skating at age seven. He was coached by Paul Wirtz for a year in Montreal. After being injured in 1998, he moved back home to be closer to his family. He then trained at the Mariposa School of Skating in Barrie, Ontario, under Lee Barkell and Doug Leigh.

Mabee won the silver medal on the novice level at nationals in 1998. He was sent to the Triglav Trophy that year and placed 5th on the novice level. He went junior the next season and placed 4th at nationals in 1999. In the 1999–2000 season, he made his debut on the Junior Grand Prix, placing 11th in Canada and 9th in Norway. He dropped down to ninth at Nationals as a junior. At the 2002 Nationals, he won the bronze medal on the junior level behind Shawn Sawyer and Keegan Murphy.

The 2002–2003 season was Mabee's senior national debut. He competed at two Junior Grand Prix events, placing 6th and 11th. He then went on to place 9 at Nationals, his first senior competition. The following season, he won his first international junior event and became the second Canadian man after Fedor Andreev to win a medal at the Junior Grand Prix Final. He moved up to sixth at Nationals, and earned a spot to the World Junior Figure Skating Championships, where he placed 5th.

The next season, Mabee won a gold and a silver on the Junior Grand Prix, but had a bad skate at the final and placed eighth. He moved up a spot at Nationals, but dropped to 10th at Junior Worlds. This was his final junior competition.

== Senior career ==
Mabee moved up to the senior level in 2005–2006, with the hopes of making the Canadian Olympic team. His quest to make the team was chronicled on The Fifth Estate, along with other skaters like Jeffrey Buttle and Emanuel Sandhu. Mabee placed ninth at Skate America and just off the podium at the NHK Trophy. He placed fourth at Nationals, missing a berth on the Olympic team by one spot. He had a career-best free skate, but his imperfect short program prevented him from placing higher. He was instead put on the team to the Four Continents Figure Skating Championships, where he won the silver medal, the first senior medal of his career.

The 2006–2007 season began badly for Mabee. He had bad skates at both his Grand Prix events, and went into Nationals with the hope of skating clean and making the world team. He did that and more. He skated two career-best programs, placing second overall, ahead of three-time national champion Emanuel Sandhu. This brought Mabee his first berth on the World team. He went back to the Four Continents Championships, where he placed 5th in a much stronger field than the previous year's. He placed 13th at Worlds.

During the 2007–2008 season, Mabee competed on the Grand Prix. He placed 5th at the 2008 Canadian Figure Skating Championships and did not qualify for either the Four Continents or World teams.

He was originally assigned to the 2008 Skate America and 2008 NHK Trophy Grand Prix events for the 2008–2009 season. However, he withdrew from them and announced in October 2008 that he would not compete in the 2008–2009 season due to a lack of motivation. He announced his retirement from competitor skating on December 10, 2008.

After his retirement, he began skating professionally on the west coast tour of Disney on Ice's High School Musical: The Ice Tour. He is now skating in the ice shows aboard the Royal Caribbean cruise ships.

== Programs ==
| Season | Short program | Free skating | Exhibition |
|---|---|---|---|
| 2007–2008 | Adagio of Spartacus and Phrygia by Aram Khachaturian | Sing, Sing, Sing from Fosse: A Song and Dance Spectacular (soundtrack) | |
| 2006–2007 | Blues Deluxe by R. Stewart | Big Band Selections Pearl Harbor (soundtrack) | Ordinary Day by Great Big Sea |
| 2005–2006 | Fear by Astor Piazzolla; Tango Remembrances by Jorge Calandrelli and Astor Piazzolla | Arvid Beaten by James Horner; Concerto For Cootie by Duke Ellington; Begin the Beguine by Cole Porter; Flyin Home by Lionel Hampton and Benny Goodman; Brothers by Hana Zimmer; Decommission & Alien Landscape by Christopher Gordon | Shout It Out Loud Play That Funky Music by Wild Cherry |
| 2004–2005 | Art of War by Vanessa-Mae | Finlandia by John Selibus | |
| 2003–2004 | Fantasia | Slaughter on 10th Avenue by Richard Rodgers Rhapsody in Blue (Part 3) by George Gershwin | |

== Results ==
GP: Grand Prix; JGP: Junior Grand Prix

International
| Event | 98–99 | 99–00 | 01–02 | 02–03 | 03–04 | 04–05 | 05–06 | 06–07 | 07–08 |
|---|---|---|---|---|---|---|---|---|---|
| Worlds | | | | | | | | 13th | |
| Four Continents | | | | | | | 2nd | 5th | |
| GP Bompard | | | | | | | | | 8th |
| GP Cup of Russia | | | | | | | | 10th | |
| GP NHK Trophy | | | | | | | 4th | | |
| GP Skate America | | | | | | | 9th | 9th | |
| GP Skate Canada | | | | | | | | | 4th |
International: Junior
| Junior Worlds | | | | | 5th | 10th | | | |
| JGP Final | | | | | 3rd | 8th | | | |
| JGP Canada | | 11th | | | | | | | |
| JGP China | | | | 11th | | | | | |
| JGP Netherlands | | | 15th | | | | | | |
| JGP Norway | | 9th | | | | | | | |
| JGP Serbia | | | | | | 1st | | | |
| JGP Slovakia | | | | | 3rd | | | | |
| JGP Slovenia | | | | | 1st | | | | |
| JGP USA | | | | 6th | | 2nd | | | |
| Triglav Trophy | | | | | | | | | |
National
| Canadian Champ. | 4th J | 9th J | 3rd J | 9th | 6th | 5th | 4th | 2nd | 5th |
