= Bill Neale =

Canadian figure skater

William Neale (born March 9, 1943, in Fort Erie, Ontario) is a Canadian former figure skater. He was the 1963 National bronze medalist.

== Results ==
Event	1960	1961	1962	1963	1964
Winter Olympic Games					16th
World Championships				15th	
Canadian Championships	3rd J	2nd J	1st J	3rd	
