= Frances Claudet =

Canadian figure skater

Personal information
- Born: April 11, 1911
- Died: October 17, 2001 (aged 90)

Figure skating career
- Country: Canada
Medal record
Representing Canada
Pairs Figure skating
North American Championships
Silver medal – second place	1931 Ottawa	Pairs
Fours' Figure skating
North American Championships
Gold medal – first place	1931 Ottawa	Fours

Frances Claudet, also known as Fran, married surname Johnson, (April 11, 1911 – October 17, 2001) was a Canadian figure skater who competed in women's singles, pair skating, and four skating; outside of Canada, she primarily competed in pairs. With partner Chauncey Bangs, she won the gold medal at the 1931 Canadian Figure Skating Championships and competed in the 1932 Winter Olympics, finishing sixth.

== Career ==
Claudet won her first medal at the Canadian Championships at age 13 in 1925, when she won bronze in the pairs competition skating with Ted Beaument.

She competed in four skating at the 1927 Canadian Championships, and her team won the silver medal. In 1928, she was part of the only fours group that competed at the Canadian Championships, and she won the silver medal at the junior level as an individual. The next year, she was third at the junior level in the singles event, and she again won silver in the four competition with her teammates, Guy Owen, Melville Rogers, and Katherine Lopdell.

Claudet paired up with Chauncey Bangs in 1931. Theresa Weld-Blanchard, describing their second-place finish program at the 1931 North American Championships, noted the pair as having no jumps, spins, or lifts and lacking variety, though she also praised them for their speed, time to the music, and unison. She also competed in the fours competition with the same group she had competed with in 1929, and their group won. At the Canadian Championships that year, her fours team won bronze, and she and Bangs won the pairs competition.

The next year, she and Bangs were the Canadian silver medallists. They competed at the 1932 Winter Olympics, where they placed 6th, and the 1932 World Championships, where they placed 5th, the highest of the three Canadian pairs at the competition.

In 1935, she competed at the North American Championships both as a singles skaters and pairs skater; she placed 7th out of 7 skaters in the women's competition, and in the pairs competition, she and her partner, Donald Cruikshank, placed 5th of 7 pairs. At the Canadian Championships, she won the bronze medal behind Constance Wilson-Samuel and Veronica Clarke.

Claudet fractured her ankle falling during a summer performance. She announced later that year that she would turn professional and coach in Quebec.

== Professional career ==
After her competitive career, Claudet skated in ice shows. She debuted in the show Gay Blades. Later, Claudet became the "first woman star" for Ice Follies and acted as a director and choreographer; she also skated in the show and paired up with Osborne Colson. By 1946, while she still skated in some group numbers, she primarily worked as the director. She worked with the show for over 30 years.

Outside of skating, Claudet was also interested in music. She gave music lessons to a young Barbara Ann Scott, who eventually became Olympic champion; Claudet was the one who encouraged her to begin skating.

== Personal life ==
Claudet's father, Henry Hayman Claudet, worked in the mining industry, specializing in the flotation process. She had a sister.

Claudet married Worthington John, an investment banker, on August 7, 1959. She became the stepmother to Johnson's son and three daughters. She died at home on October 17, 2001, "during sunset, her favorite time of day."

== Results ==
=== Women's singles ===
Competition placements between the 1927–1928 and 1934–1935 season
Season	1927–1928	1928–1929	1934–1935
North American Championships			7th
Canadian Championships	2nd J	3rd J	3rd

=== Pairs ===
Competition placements between the 1924–1925 and 1934–1935 season
Season	1924–1925	1930–1931	1931–1932	1934–1935
Winter Olympics			6th	
World Championships			5th	
North American Championships		2nd		5th
Canadian Championships	3rd	1st	2nd	

=== Fours ===
Competition placements between the 1926–1927 and 1930–1931 season
Season	1926–1927	1927–1928	1928–1929	1930–1931
North American Championships				1st
Canadian Championships	2nd	1st	2nd	3rd
