= Kenneth Ormsby =

Canadian ice dancer

Figure skating career
- Country: Canada
- Partner: Paulette Doan
- Retired: 1964
Medal record
Figure skating
Ice dancing
Representing Canada
World Championships
Silver medal – second place	1964 Dortmund	Ice dancing
Bronze medal – third place	1963 Cortina d'Ampezzo	Ice dancing
North American Championships
Gold medal – first place	1963 Vancouver	Ice dancing
Bronze medal – third place	1961 Philadelphia	Ice dancing

Kenneth Ormsby is a former Canadian ice dancer. Competing with Paulette Doan, he was the 1963 and 1964 Canadian champion and in those years won bronze and silver medals (respectively) at the World Figure Skating Championships.

Ormsby was from Toronto and trained there during his competitive career. He was also studying for a degree in accounting.

After the 1964 season, Doan and Ormsby turned professional and toured with Ice Follies. They announced their engagement the day they joined the show.

As of 2010, Kenneth Ormsby is on the coaching staff at the Scarboro Figure Skating Club in Toronto, Ontario.

== Results ==
(with Paulette Doan)

Event	1961	1962	1963	1964
World Championships		5th	3rd	2nd
North American Championships	3rd		1st	
Canadian Championships (junior)	1st J.*			
Canadian Championships	3rd	3rd	1st	1st

- Doan and Ormsby competed in both the junior and senior events at the 1961 Canadian Championships.
