= Lee Barkell =

Canadian figure skater and skating coach

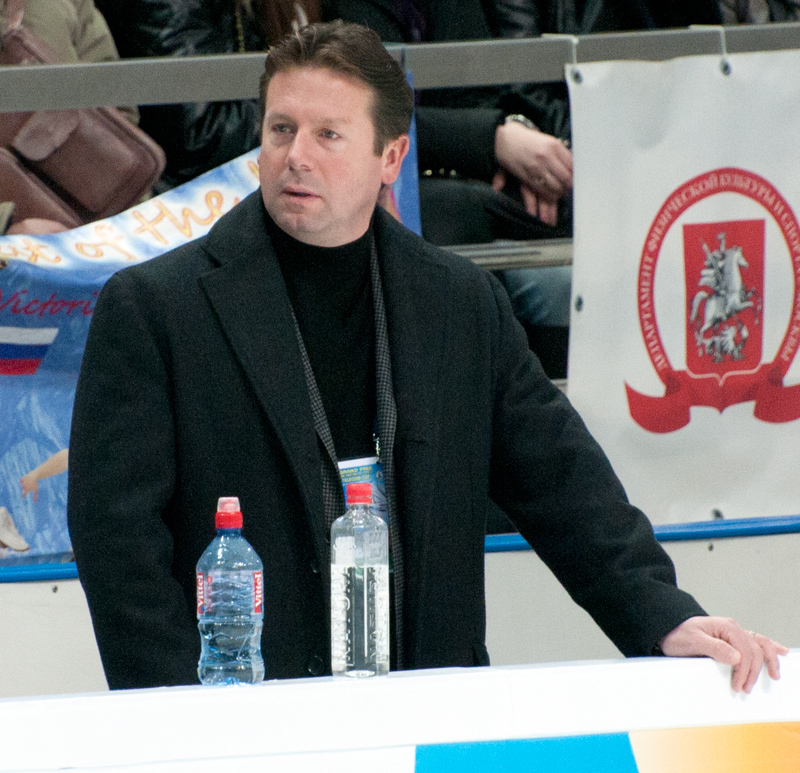
- Barkell at the 2011 Rostelecom Cup

Personal information
- Home town: Kirkland Lake, Ontario

Figure skating career
- Country: Canada
- Partner: Melanie Gaylor
- Retired: c. 1989

Lee Barkell originally from Kirkland Lake, Ontario is a Canadian figure skating coach, working with both singles and pairs, and a former competitive pair skater. With Melanie Gaylor, he won gold at the 1986 Fujifilm Trophy, 1986 Nebelhorn Trophy, and 1986 Grand Prix International St. Gervais.

== Career ==
Barkell competed in pair skating during the 1980s, in partnership with Melanie Gaylor. The pair won three international competitions — the 1986 Fujifilm Trophy, 1986 Nebelhorn Trophy and 1986 Grand Prix International St. Gervais. The duo received two Canadian national medals in the fours discipline — bronze in 1987 with Cynthia Coull / Mark Rowsom and silver in 1988 with Michelle Menzies / Kevin Wheeler.

After retiring from competition, Barkell began a coaching career in Barrie, Ontario, at the Mariposa School of Skating, where he was the director of pair skating. In the summer of 2014, Barkell moved to Toronto and started coaching at the Toronto Cricket, Skating and Curling Club. In the summer of 2019, Barkell moved to the Granite Club in Toronto.

His current students include:

- David Bondar
- Stephen Gogolev
- Alec Guinzbourg
- Ava Kemp / Yohnatan Elizarov
- Kim Chae-yeon
- Minsol Kwon
- Megan Woodley
- Kara Yun

His former students have included:

- Jeffrey Buttle (2008 World champion and 2006 Olympic bronze medalist)
- Corey Circelli
- Gabrielle Daleman (2018 Canadian Champion, 2017 World bronze medalist and 2017 Four Continents silver medalist)
- Meagan Duhamel / Ryan Arnold
- Liubov Ilyushechkina / Dylan Moscovitch (2017 Four Continents bronze medalists)
- Anabelle Langlois / Cody Hay
- Jacinthe Larivière / Lenny Faustino
- Alysa Liu
- Christopher Mabee
- Carolyn MacCuish / Andrew Evans
- Satoko Miyahara
- Patrick Myzyk
- Nobunari Oda (2006 Four Continents champion)
- Joey Russell
- Roman Sadovsky
- Vincent Zhou

== Competitive highlights ==
=== Pairs with Gaylor ===
International
Event	85–86	86–87	87–88	88–89	89–90
Fujifilm Trophy / Nations Cup		1st			5th
International St. Gervais		1st			
Skate Canada				5th	
NHK Trophy			4th		
Nebelhorn Trophy		1st			
National
Canadian Championships	1st J	6th	6th	5th	
J = Junior level

=== Fours with Gaylor and others ===
National
Event	1987	1988
Canadian Championships	3rd^{1}	2nd^{2}
Partners in addition to Melanie Gaylor:^{1} Cynthia Coull / Mark Rowsom^{2} Michelle Menzies / Kevin Wheeler
