= Dorothy Benson =

Canadian photographer

Dorothy Benson (1901–1996) was a Canadian photographer, best known for her wildlife photography and her involvement with the Montreal Camera Club, the Toronto Guild of Photography, and the Kingston Photographic Club.

== Early life ==
Born in Montreal in 1901, Benson's family owned the St. Lawrence Starch Company and she was educated at The Study in Montreal, a leading Canadian private all-girls school, where she was Head Girl. Benson was also an accomplished figure skater, winning the Canadian Junior Singles Figure Skating championship in 1928 and placed third the same year in the Senior Singles division.

== Career ==
=== WWII ===
At the outbreak of the Second World War, Benson joined the "Wrens", the Women's Royal Canadian Naval Service as a petty officer, creating a photographic documentary at the Basic Training Establishment in Galt, now Cambridge, Ontario containing over 3000 pictures.

=== Montreal Camera Club ===
Following her honourable discharge, Benson pursued her photographic hobby by studying for a year at the Vermont School of Photography. Upon her return to Montreal she became an active member of the Montreal Camera Club in 1936, eventually serving as the club's first female president from 1965 to 1967.

=== Kingston Photographic Club ===
In 1970, Benson moved to Kingston, Ontario, and became a member of the Kingston Photographic Club. She devoted much of her time there to helping other members improve their techniques and eventually began writing "Camera Capers" in 1975, a regular column in the club's newsletter dedicated to helping its members improve their work.

== Legacy ==
=== Awards ===
Both Dorothy Benson's photography and personality left a great impression during her time in the Montreal Camera Club and the Kingston Photographic Club. In honour of her contributions, there are two awards sharing Benson's name for nature photography.

For her time as the first female president, the Montreal Camera Club awards the Dorothy Benson Trophy to the Class B member having the highest aggregate score for 12 Nature Images submitted during any one year.

Similarly, for Benson's dedication to helping new members learn in her column "Camera Capers", the Kingston Photographic Club awards a trophy of the same name annually for the top nature photographer.

=== Girl Guides ===
Benson's preferred subject was nature photography, her camera accompanying her on camping excursions as a dedicated Girl Guides leader. Many of her nature photographs would be used in the Girl Guide book for many years to come (Ward, 35).

=== Camera Capers ===
The Kingston Photography Club would eventually adopt Benson's "Camera Capers" as the official title of their newsletter and continues to do so to this day.

=== Nature Photography ===
Benson successfully exhibited in the Photographic Society of America competitions in the print, nature and colour slide divisions, the majority of her works are held in the Queen's University archive as well as the National Gallery of Canada.

Benson was known to explore all aspects of photography, however, her interest was in nature colour slide photography. Benson considered photography to be more than a hobby some of her favourite spots were her family cottage at Thousand Islands and the Rideau Waterway. Benson was very passionate about preserving the natural world and did so with her images, and would go to great, and sometimes dangerous, lengths to capture the natural world in her images.
