= Jean-François Hébert =

Canadian figure skater

Personal information
- Born: 17 August 1972 Warwick, Quebec
- Died: 28 November 2018 (aged 46) Mercier, Quebec
- Height: 1.63 m (5 ft 4 in)

Figure skating career
- Country: Canada
- Coach: Eric Gillies, Josée Picard
- Skating club: CPA Warwick
- Began skating: 1979
- Retired: c. 1999

Jean-François Hébert (born August 17, 1972 in Warwick, Quebec – died November 28, 2018) was a Canadian competitive figure skater who appeared in men's singles. He won bronze medals at the 1993 Nebelhorn Trophy and 1999 Canadian Championships. He also represented Canada at the 1999 Four Continents Championships, where he placed 11th.

== Programs ==
Season	Short program	Free skating
1998–99		Desda Agentro (One Man's Tango) by J. J. Mosalini; Felicia (Forever Tango Vol. 2) by E. Saborido; A Los Amigos (Forever Tango Vol. 2) by A. Pontier

== Competitive highlights ==
GP: Champions Series / Grand Prix

International
Event	89–90	91–92	92–93	93–94	94–95	95–96	96–97	97–98	98–99
Four Continents									11th
GP NHK Trophy								11th	
GP Skate America									10th
GP Skate Canada						13th			
GP Sparkassen									6th
Nations Cup					6th				
Nebelhorn Trophy				3rd				12th	
Prague Skate			6th						
St. Gervais				7th					
National
Canadian Champ.	3rd J	3rd J	5th	5th	7th	10th	5th	4th	3rd

== Death ==
He died on November 28, 2018.
