= Douglas Court =

Canadian figure skater (1933–2019)

Douglas Court (March 3, 1933 – March 25, 2019) was a Canadian figure skater. He was the 1954–55 silver and 1956 national bronze medalist.

== Results ==
Competition	1952	1953	1954	1955	1956
World Championships			10th		
Canadian Championships	3rd J	1st J	2nd	2nd	3rd
