= Fraser Sweatman =

Canadian figure skater

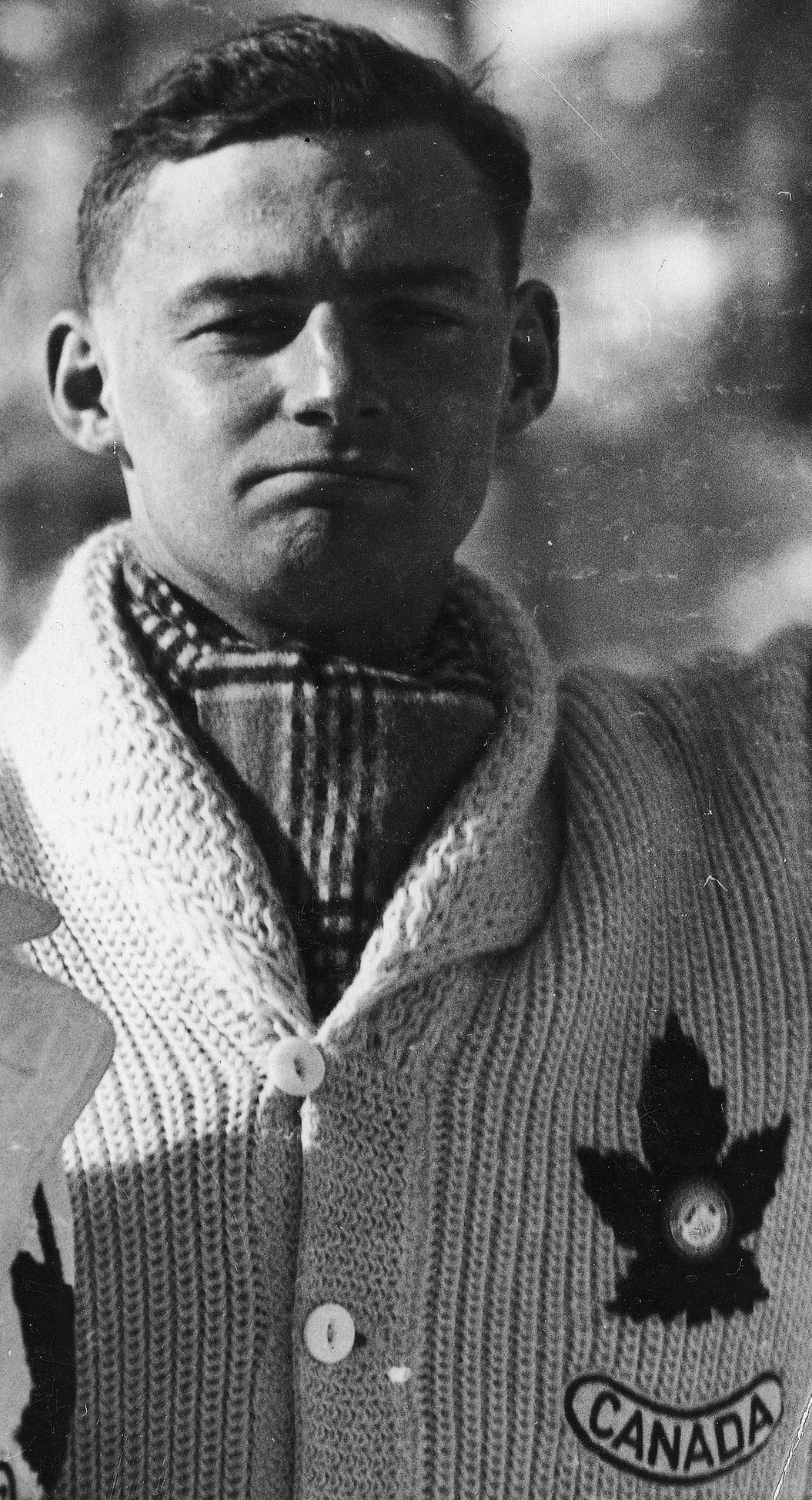
- Sweatman at the 1936 Winter Olympics

Personal information
- Born: October 14, 1913 (age 112) Winnipeg, Manitoba, Canada
- Died: May 15, 1991 (aged 77)

Figure skating career
- Country: Canada
- Discipline: Pair skating
- Partner: Audrey Garland

Fraser Sweatman (October 14, 1913 – May 15, 1991) was a Canadian pair skater. With partner Audrey Garland, he won the silver medal at the Canadian Figure Skating Championships in 1935 and competed in the 1936 Winter Olympics. He was born in Winnipeg, Manitoba.

== Results ==
Pairs (with Garland)

Event	1934	1935	1936
Winter Olympic Games			12th
Canadian Championships	1st J	2nd	

Men's singles

Event	1929
Canadian Championships	3rd J
