= Guy Owen (figure skater) =

Canadian figure skater (1913–1952)

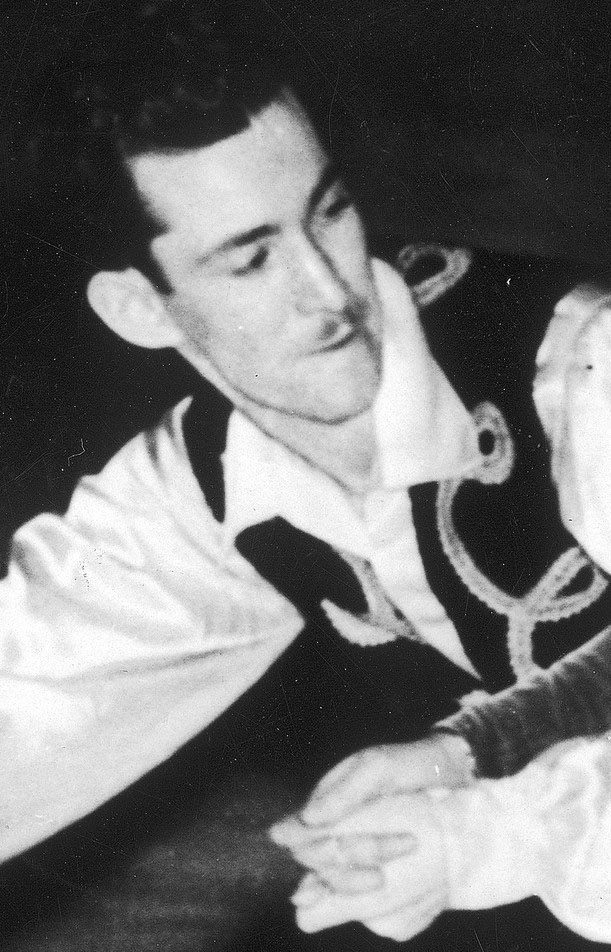
- Owen in 1936

Personal information
- Born: Guy Rochon Owen; August 22, 1913
- Died: April 21, 1952 (aged 38) Ottawa, Ontario

Figure skating career
- Country: Canada
Medal record
Representing Canada
Fours' Figure skating
North American Championships
Gold medal – first place	1937 Boston	Fours
Gold medal – first place	1935 Montreal	Fours
Gold medal – first place	1933 New York	Fours
Gold medal – first place	1931 Ottawa	Fours

Guy Rochon Owen (August 22, 1913 – April 21, 1952) was a Canadian figure skating champion.

Owen initially competed in the men's individual figure skating event, winning the 1929 Canadian junior men's singles championship. He went on to specialize in the "Fours Event" with great success. For five straight years between 1933 and 1937, Owen and his skating partners Margaret Davis, Prudence Holbrook, and Melville Rogers won the Fours Event at the Canadian National Figure Skating Championships plus they also captured the bi-annual North American Figure Skating Championship three successive times in 1933, 1935, and 1937.

In 1938 Guy Owen married Maribel Vinson, nine-time United States ladies figure skating champion, and settled in Berkeley, California. They had two daughters, Maribel Owen (1940–1961) and Laurence Owen (1944–1961). During World War II, Owen worked at a shipyard during the day and taught ice skating to students after hours.

Guy and Maribel Owen turned professional, earning a living as performers with ice skating shows such as the International Ice Skate Revue before setting up their own show. Their two daughters stayed with their maternal grandparents while their parents toured. Conflict arose in the marriage. Guy Owen was somewhat shy; Maribel Vinson was extroverted, demanding and outspoken. Vinson complained to one of her students about Owen's excessive drinking. Owen found show business and long separations from his family stressful. Owen and Vinson divorced in 1949 and she and the daughters moved back east to the Boston area in 1952, where they lived with her recently widowed mother in Winchester.

During his final year, Owen worked in Spokane, Washington. While visiting his parents in Ottawa, Owen died at age 38 of a perforated ulcer on April 21, 1952. His ex-wife and daughters died nine years later in the Sabena 548 plane crash in Belgium, which killed the U.S. figure skating team in February 1961.

== Results ==
=== Men's singles ===
Event	1929	1932	1933	1934	1935
Canadian Championships	1st J.	2nd	2nd	2nd	3rd

=== Fours ===
(with Margaret Davis, Prudence Holbrook, and Melville Rogers)

Event	1932	1933	1934	1935	1936	1937
North American Championships		1st		1st		1st
Canadian Championships	2nd	1st	1st	1st	1st	1st

(with Frances Claudet, Kathleen Lopdell, and Melville Rogers)

Event	1929	1930	1931
North American Championships			1st
Canadian Championships	2nd		3rd

== See also ==
- Maribel Vinson
- Maribel Owen
- Laurence Owen
