= Royal Glenora Club =

Sports club in Edmonton, Alberta

- Abbreviation: RGC
- Formation: 1961; 65 years ago
- Merger of: Glenora Skating and Tennis Club, Braemar Badminton Club, Royal Curling Club
- Location: 11160 River Valley Road NW, Edmonton
- Coordinates: 53.5334°N 113.5157°W
- Services: Aquatics, arena, badminton, fitness, gymnastics, massage therapy, figure skating, squash, tennis
- Chief executive officer: Dustin McAvoy
- Website: royalglenora.com

The Royal Glenora Club is a member-owned, private sport and social club in Edmonton, Alberta, Canada. Opened in 1961, the Royal Glenora started as an amalgamation of three Edmonton sport clubs; the Glenora Skating and Tennis Club, the Braemar Badminton Club, and the Royal Curling Club. The club has several tennis, squash and badminton courts. In addition, the club features an indoor glass-enclosed pool with a retractable roof and an indoor ice arena.

The Royal Glenora Club was the location of the 2006 Women's World Team Squash Championship.

The club is one of the major training sites for figure skating in Canada. Notable skaters who have trained at or represented the Royal Glenora Club include Kurt Browning, Jamie Sale and David Pelletier, Michael Slipchuk, Susan Humphreys, Annabelle Langlois and Cody Hay, and Kristi Yamaguchi.
