= Donald Gilchrist =

Canadian figure skater (1922–2017)

Personal information
- Full name: Donald Hunter Gilchrist
- Born: January 2, 1922 Toronto, Ontario, Canada
- Died: March 14, 2017 (aged 95)

Figure skating career
- Country: Canada
- Partner: Marlene Smith; Eleanor O'Meara
- Skating club: Toronto Skating Club
- Began skating: February 1928
- Retired: c. 1950
Medal record
Representing Canada
Figure skating: Pairs
North American Championships
Silver medal – second place	1949 Philadelphia	Pairs

Donald Hunter Gilchrist (January 2, 1922 – March 14, 2017) was a Canadian figure skater. As a pair skater with Marlene Smith, he became the 1949 North American silver medallist and a two-time Canadian national champion (1949–1950). He was a three-time national silver medallist in men's singles.

== Personal life ==
Gilchrist was born on January 2, 1922, in Toronto. He graduated from the University of Toronto (Trinity) in 1950 and married Christiane Legier in 1952; the couple had three children: Nancy Ann, Donald, and Jean. He died at age 95 on March 14, 2017.

== Career ==
=== Figure skating ===
Gilchrist began skating when he joined the Toronto Skating Club in February 1928. Competing in men's singles, he won silver at three consecutive Canadian Championships, from 1940 to 1942.

After a partnership with Eleanor O'Meara, he teamed up with Marlene Smith. The pair won two national titles (1949–1950) and silver at the 1949 North American Championships.

Gilchrist began judging international skating competitions in 1951. He judged at the 1952 Winter Olympics and at multiple World Championships (1952, 1959, 1964, 1967), and also served as a referee.

He was a substitute member of the International Skating Union (ISU) Single & Pair Skating Technical Committee (from 1953), a main member of the technical committee (1969–1971, 1973–1980), an ISU Council member (1980–1992), and an ISU Honorary Member (from 1992). He was inducted into the Canadian Figure Skating Hall of Fame in 1996.

=== Other ===
Gilchrist served as a marksman and captain in the Royal Canadian Army Service Corps during the 1940s. He worked for Canada's Department of Defence Production in Washington (1952 to the 1960s), as director general of the Trade Commissioner Service (from 1966), as a vice-president of the Canadian Commercial Corporation, as consul general in Los Angeles (from 1974), and as minister-counsellor at the embassy in the Netherlands (1982–1986).

== Competitive highlights ==
=== Pairs with Smith ===
International
Event	1949	1950
World Championships		7th
North American Championships	2nd	
National
Canadian Championships	1st	1st

=== Pairs with O'Meara ===
National
Event	1940
Canadian Championships	3rd

=== Men's singles ===
National
Event	1937	1939	1940	1941	1942
Canadian Championships	3rd J	2nd J	2nd	2nd	2nd
J = Junior level
