= Robin Cowan =

Canadian pair skater

Personal information
- Full name: Robin Cowan

Figure skating career
- Country: Canada
- Partner: Sherri Baier

Robin Cowan is a Canadian former pair skater. With partner Sherri Baier, he won the World Junior Championships in 1976, its inaugural year, and then went on to win the Canadian national championships in 1978.

He went on to become Professor of Management at the University of Strasbourg, France, and Professor of Economics at Maastricht University, the Netherlands, after studying at Queen's University in Canada and at Stanford University in the United States, where he received a Ph.D. in economics and an M.A. in philosophy.

== Results ==
pairs with Sherri Baier

Event	1976	1977	1978
World Championships		10th	WD
World Junior Championships	1st		
Canadian Championships			1st
