= David McGillivray (figure skater) =

Canadian figure skater (1949–2025)

David McGillivray (September 30, 1949 – June 2, 2025) was a Canadian figure skater who competed in men's singles. He competed at the 1968 Winter Olympics and won the gold medal at the Canadian Figure Skating Championships in 1970.

McGillivray died on June 2, 2025 in Montreal, Quebec, at the age of 75. He married Gregg Blachford in January of 2010.

== Results ==
Event	1965	1966	1968	1969	1970
Winter Olympics			16th		
World Championships			10th	10th	11th
Canadian Championships	2nd J	1st J	2nd	2nd	1st
