= Carolyn Skoczen =

Canadian figure skater

Personal information
- Other names: Carolyn Kooiman
- Born: 8/28/61 Sault Ste Marie, Ontario, Canada
- Height: 5 ft 4 in (163 cm)

Figure skating career
- Country: Canada
- Coach: Dave Mathewson
- Skating club: Windsor FSC
- Began skating: Age 8
- Retired: Age 18, then went on to tour with Ice Follies/International

Carolyn Skoczen (married surname Kooiman) is a Canadian former competitive figure skater. She was the 1977 World Junior champion. She represented Windsor FSC.

As of 2016, she was a coach at the Skating Club of Vail in Vail, Colorado. In 2019, she was coaching in Denver, at the Edge Ice Arena in Littleton, and at Ice Center at the Promenade in Westminster.

== Competitive highlights ==
International
Event	1974–75	1975–76	1976–77
World Junior Champ.			1st
Nebelhorn Trophy		8th	
Skate Canada			11th
National
Canadian Champ.	2nd N.	3rd J.	2nd J.
Levels: N. = Novice; J. = Junior
