= Sherri Baier =

Canadian pair skater

Sherri Baier is a former Canadian pair skater. With partner Robin Cowan, she won the World Junior Championships in 1976, its inaugural year, and won the Canadian national championships in 1978.

== Results ==
(pairs with Robin Cowan)

Event	1976	1977	1978
World Championships		10th	WD
World Junior Championships	1st		
Canadian Championships			1st
