= Daniel Béland =

Canadian figure skater

Figure skating career
- Country: Canada
- Skating club: CPA Saint-Laurent
- Retired: c. 1981

Daniel Béland is a Canadian former competitive figure skater. After winning the 1977 World Junior Championships, he was awarded medals at the Ennia Challenge Cup and Prague Skate. His skating club was CPA Palestre Nationale. In 2007, he joined the coaching staff of CPA Saint-Laurent in Saint-Laurent, Quebec.

International
Event	74–75	75–76	76–77	77–78	80–81
Ennia Challenge Cup				3rd	3rd
Prague Skate					2nd
St. Gervais			7th		
International: Junior
World Junior Champ.	1st				
National
Canadian Champ.	1st N	3rd J	2nd J	2nd J	
Levels: N = Novice; J = Junior
