= Doug Leigh =

Canadian figure skating coach

Personal information
- Full name: Douglas Leigh

Figure skating career
- Country: Canada
- Skating club: North Bay FSC

Douglas Leigh is a Canadian figure skating coach. He is the head coach and founder of the Mariposa School of Skating. Among his former students are Brian Orser, Elvis Stojko, Takeshi Honda, Jennifer Robinson, Steven Cousins, Jeffrey Buttle, Ben Ferreira, Kristy Wirtz and Kris Wirtz, Lesley Hawker, Zeus Issariotis, Brandon Mroz, Tuğba Karademir, and Christopher Mabee.

During his competitive career, he was coached by Hans Gersweiller, Karol Divín, and Sheldon Galbraith. He won the silver medal on the Junior level at the 1966 Canadian Figure Skating Championships.
