= Paul Mills (figure skater) =

Canadian pair skater

Paul Mills is a Canadian former pair skater. He won the 1977 World Junior Figure Skating Championships with partner Josée France. He won the silver medal at the 1978 Canadian Figure Skating Championships with Lea Ann Jackson. They went on to place eleventh at the World Figure Skating Championships.

== Results ==
(pairs with Jackson)

Event	1978
Canadian Championships	2nd
