= Josée France =

Canadian pair skater

Josée France is a Canadian former pair skater. She won the 1977 World Junior Figure Skating Championships with partner Paul Mills.
