= United States Figure Skating Hall of Fame =

Award

Coordinates: 38°47′38″N 104°50′56″W

The United States Figure Skating Hall of Fame is a hall of fame that honors individuals who have made outstanding contributions to the sport of figure skating in the United States. It is managed by the U.S. Figure Skating. To be inducted into it is considered the highest achievement an American figure skater can attain. It was founded in 1976. It is located in the World Figure Skating Museum and Hall of Fame, in Colorado Springs, Colorado, United States. Nominees are formally inducted at an annual ceremony held during the U.S. Figure Skating Championships.

== Selection Process ==
Nominations are accepted from both the skating community as well as the general public for four categories: Competitors, Coaches, Non-Athletic Contributors, and Creative Impact Contributors. Competitors must have been retired from skating for at least five years prior to being nominated. The U.S. Hall of Fame Committee puts out a ballet which is voted on by selected, distinguished, electors. Candidates that receive 66% of the votes are inducted.

== Inductees ==
Skater	Inducted
Tenley Albright	1976
Sherwin Badger	1976
Theresa Weld Blanchard	1976
Irving Brokaw	1976
Richard Button	1976
Peggy Fleming	1976
Jackson Haines	1976
Carol Heiss	1976
David Jenkins	1976
Hayes Alan Jenkins	1976
Oscar Johnson	1976
Howard Nicholson	1976
Maribel Vinson Owen	1976
Eddie Shipstad	1976
A. Winsor Weld	1976
Henry M. Beatty	1977
Beatrix Loughran	1977
Heaton R. Robertson	1977
Nathaniel W. Niles	1978
Harold Hartshorne	1981
William O. Hickok IV	1981
George H. Browne	1983
Eugene Turner	1983
F. Ritter Shumway	1986
Scott Hamilton	1990
Tai Babilonia & Randy Gardner	1991
James Grogan	1991
Dorothy Hamill	1991
Karol Kennedy & Peter Kennedy	1991
Ardelle Sanderson	1991
Judy Schwomeyer & James Sladky	1991
Charles Tickner	1991
Lois Waring & Michael McGean	1991
William Thayer Tutt	1991
Yvonne Sherman Tutt	1991
Richard Dywer	1993
Linda Fratianne	1993
Harry N. Keighley	1993
Nancy Ludington Graham & Ronald Ludington	1993
John Nicks	1993
Colleen O’Connor & Jim Millns	1993
Walter S. Powell	1993
Ronnie Robertson	1993
Tim Wood	1993
Carlo Fassi	1994
Janet Lynn	1994
JoJo Starbuck & Kenneth Shelley	1994
Roger F. Turner	1994
Maribel Y. Vinson Owen & George E.B. Hill	1994
Cynthia Kauffman Marshall & Ronald Kauffman	1995
Robin Lee	1995
Roy Shipstad	1995
Judy Blumberg & Michael Seibert	1996
Brian Boitano	1996
Frank Carroll	1996
Joseph L. Serafine	1996
Jane Vaughn Sullivan	1996
Andree Anderson & Donald Jacoby	1997
Joan Tozzer Cave	1997
Mabel Fairbanks	1997
Frederick C. LeFevre	1997
Barbara Roles Williams	1997
Benjamin T. Wright	1997
Tom Collins	1998
Oscar Iobst	1998
Gordon McKellen Jr	1998
Evy Scotvold & Mary Scotvold	1998
Kristi Yamaguchi	1998
Caitlin Carruthers & Peter Carruthers	1999
John Misha Petkevich	1999
Scott Ethan Allen	2000
Gretchen Merrill	2000
Debi Thomas	2000
Frank Zamboni	2000
Gary Visconti	2001
Rosalynn Sumners	2001
Don Laws	2001
Arthur Vaughn	2001
Elizabeth Punsalan & Jerod Swallow	2002
Jill Trenary	2002
Slavka Kohout Button	2002
Margaretta Drake	2002
Skippy Baxter	2003
Chuck Foster	2003
Doug Wilson	2003
Elaine Zayak	2003
Jill Watson & Peter Oppegard	2004
Norma Sahlin & Wally Sahlin	2004
Hugh C. Graham, Jr	2004
Nancy Kerrigan	2004
Mary Louise Wright	2005
Catherine Machado	2005
Tara Lipinski	2006
Charles M. Schulz	2007
Paul Wylie	2007
Janet Gerhauser Carpenter	2007
Charles DeMore	2008
Todd Eldredge	2008
Sonya Klopfer Dunfield	2009
Nancy Meiss	2009
Marjorie Parker Smith	2009
Joseph Savage	2009
Vera Wang	2009
Sarah Hughes	2010
Jenni Meno & Todd Sand	2010
Robert Turk	2010
1961 U.S. World Team	2011
Michelle Kwan	2012
Rudy Galindo	2013
Lori Nichol	2013
Albert Beard	2014
Lynn Benson	2014
Terry Kubicka	2014
Anne Gerli	2015
Ricki Harris	2015
David Santee	2015
Tanith Belbin & Ben Agosto	2016
Sasha Cohen	2016
Gustave F. Lussi	2016
Evan Lysacek	2016
Peter Burrows	2017
Claire Ferguson	2018
Kyoko Ina & John Zimmerman	2018
Sarah Kawahara	2018
Michael Weiss	2018
Carol Fox & Richard Dalley	2019
Timothy Goebel	2019
Julie Lynn Holmes	2019
Meryl Davis & Charlie White	2020
Kimmie Meissner	2020
Kathy Casey	2020
Johnny Weir	2021
Sandra Lamb	2021
Gale Tanger	2021
Lucy Brennan	2022
Tiffany Chin	2022
Vicki Korn	2022
Paul E. George	2023
Maia Shibutani & Alex Shibutani	2023
Charlie Cyr	2024
Christa Fassi	2024
Vivian Joseph & Ronald Joseph	2024
Albertina Noyes, and	2025
Renée Roca	2025
Robert Horen	2025
Nathan Chen	2026
Rafael Arutyunyan	2026
Joseph Inman	2026

All entire 1961 U.S. World Team were killed aboard Sabena Flight 548 and were honored posthumously to commemorate the fiftieth anniversary of their deaths.
