= 1964 World Figure Skating Championships =

Annual figure skating competition held in 1964

- Type: ISU Championship
- Date: February 25 – March 1
- Season: 1964
- Location: Dortmund, West Germany

Champions
- Men's singles: (West Germany) Manfred Schnelldorfer
- Ladies' singles: (Netherlands) Sjoukje Dijkstra
- Pairs: (West Germany) Marika Kilius / Hans-Jürgen Bäumler
- Ice dance: (Czechoslovakia) Eva Romanová / Pavel Roman
- Previous: 1963 World Championships
- Next: 1965 World Championships

The World Figure Skating Championships is an annual figure skating competition sanctioned by the International Skating Union in which figure skaters compete for the title of World Champion.

The 1964 competitions for men's singles, ladies' singles, pair skating, and ice dance took place from February 25 to March 1 in Dortmund, West Germany.

== Medal table ==
* Host nation (West Germany)

Rank	Nation	Gold	Silver	Bronze	Total
1	West Germany*	2	0	0	2
2	Czechoslovakia	1	0	1	2
3	Netherlands	1	0	0	1
4	Canada	0	1	2	3
5	Austria	0	1	0	1
5	France	0	1	0	1
5	Soviet Union	0	1	0	1
8	Great Britain	0	0	1	1
Totals (8 entries)		4	4	4	12

== Results ==
=== Men ===
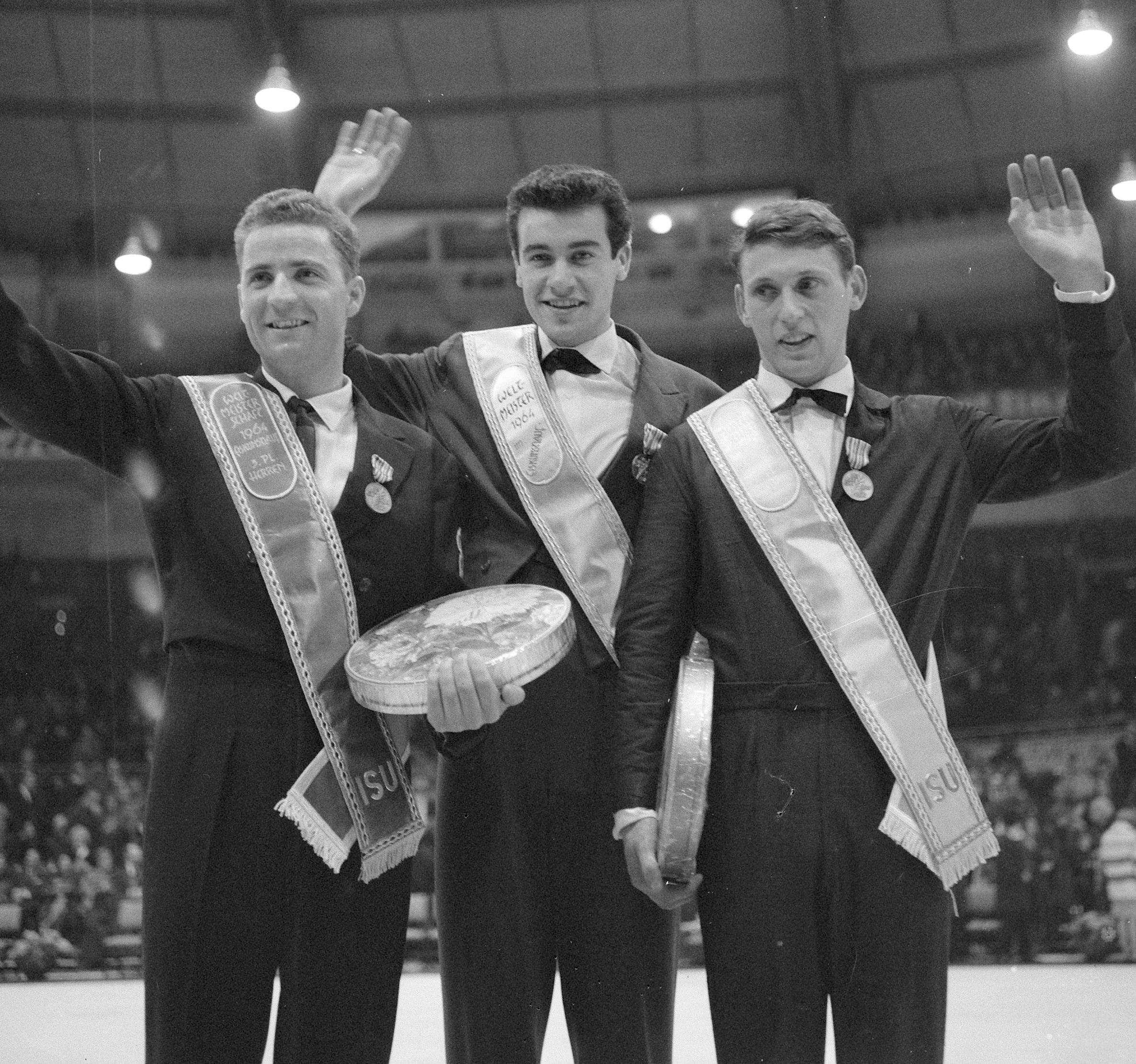
Left-right: Karol Divín, Manfred Schnelldorfer, Alain Calmat

Rank	Name	Places
1	(West Germany) Manfred Schnelldorfer	10
2	(France) Alain Calmat	23
3	(Czechoslovakia) Karol Divín	38
4	(United States) Scott Allen	39
5	(Austria) Emmerich Danzer	44
6	(United States) Thomas Litz	50
7	(Austria) Peter Jonas	60
8	(Japan) Nobuo Satō	68
9	(Canada) Donald Knight	79
10	(West Germany) Sepp Schönmetzler	95
11	(United States) Monty Hoyt	95
12	(Canada) Charles Snelling	106
13	(France) Robert Dureville	121
14	(France) Patrick Péra	136
15	(Soviet Union) Valeriy Meshkov	137
16	(West Germany) Hugo Dümmler	142
17	(Czechoslovakia) Ondrej Nepela	148
18	(United Kingdom) Hywel Evans	150
19	(Netherlands) Wouter Toledo	169

Judges:

- (Canada) P. Devine
- (Soviet Union) Georgiy Felitsyn
- (Czechoslovakia) Zdeněk Fikar
- (Japan) Haruo Konno
- (Austria) Hans Meixner
- (Italy) Giovanni de Mori
- (France) Gérard Rodrigues-Henriques
- (United States) Ardelle Sanderson
- (West Germany) Adolf Walker

=== Ladies ===
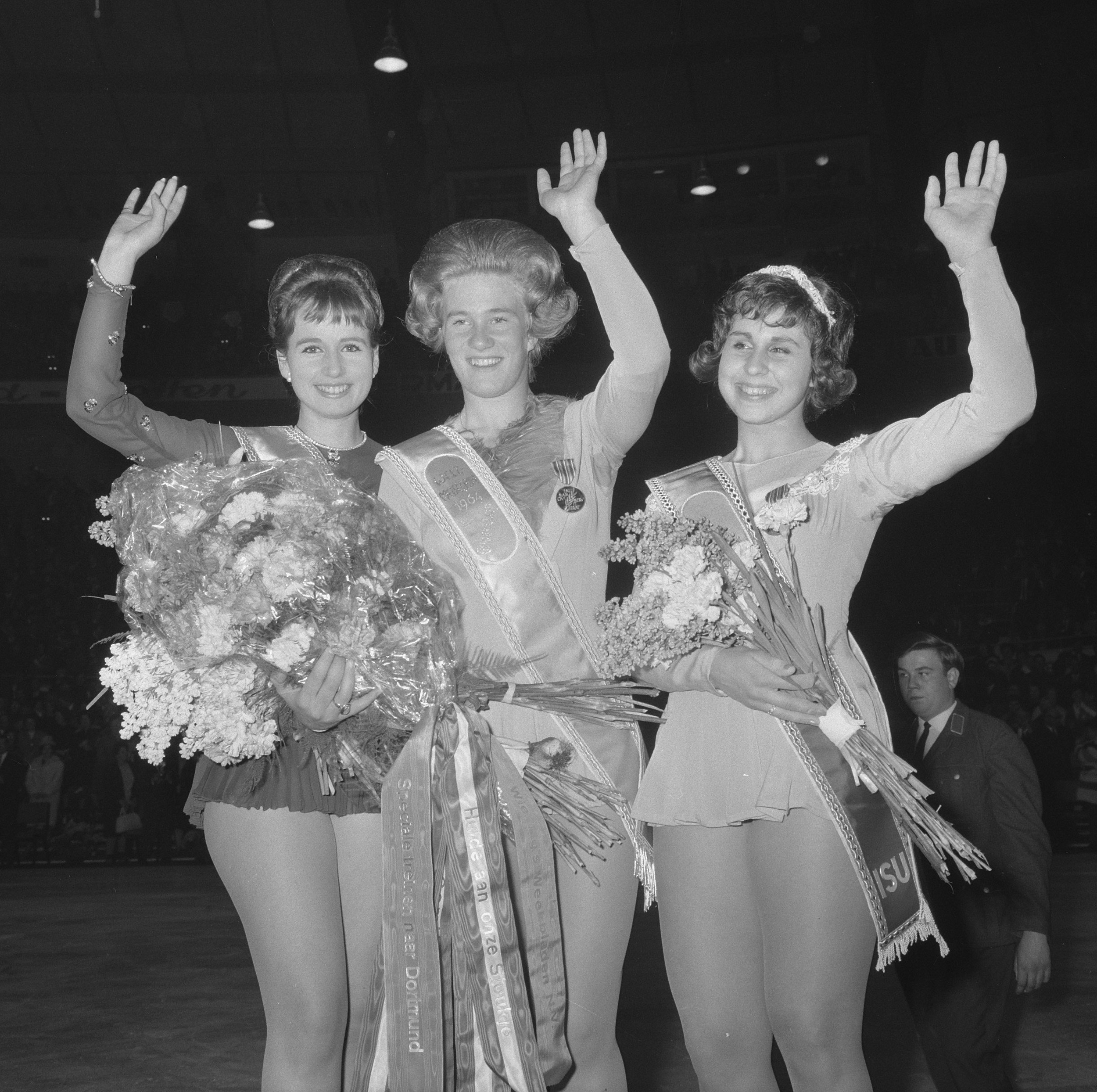
Left-right: Regine Heitzer, Sjoukje Dijkstra, Petra Burka

Rank	Name	Places
1	(Netherlands) Sjoukje Dijkstra	9
2	(Austria) Regine Heitzer	21
3	(Canada) Petra Burka	24
4	(France) Nicole Hassler	42
5	(United States) Christine Haigler	52
6	(Japan) Miwa Fukuhara	54
7	(United States) Peggy Fleming	56
8	(United Kingdom) Sally-Anne Stapleford	89
9	(United States) Albertina Noyes	90
10	(Canada) Shirra Kenworthy	95
11	(Canada) Wendy Griner	102
12	(Austria) Helli Sengstschmid	104
13	(Japan) Kumiko Ōkawa	109
14	(West Germany) Inge Paul	119
15	(West Germany) Uschi Keszler	123
16	(Czechoslovakia) Hana Mašková	151
17	(Austria) Astrid Czermak	152
18	(Hungary) Zsuzsa Almássy	154
19	(Italy) Sandra Brugnera	169
20	(Sweden) Ann-Margreth Frei	176
21	(Belgium) Christine van de Putte	188

Judges:

- (Hungary) Zoltán Balázs
- (France) P. Baron
- (Netherlands) Charlotte Benedict-Stieber
- (Canada) Donald Gilchrist
- (Japan) Masao Hasegawa
- (Czechoslovakia) Miroslav Hasenöhrl
- (Austria) Walter Malek
- (United Kingdom) Pamela Peat
- (West Germany) János Zsigmondy

=== Pairs ===
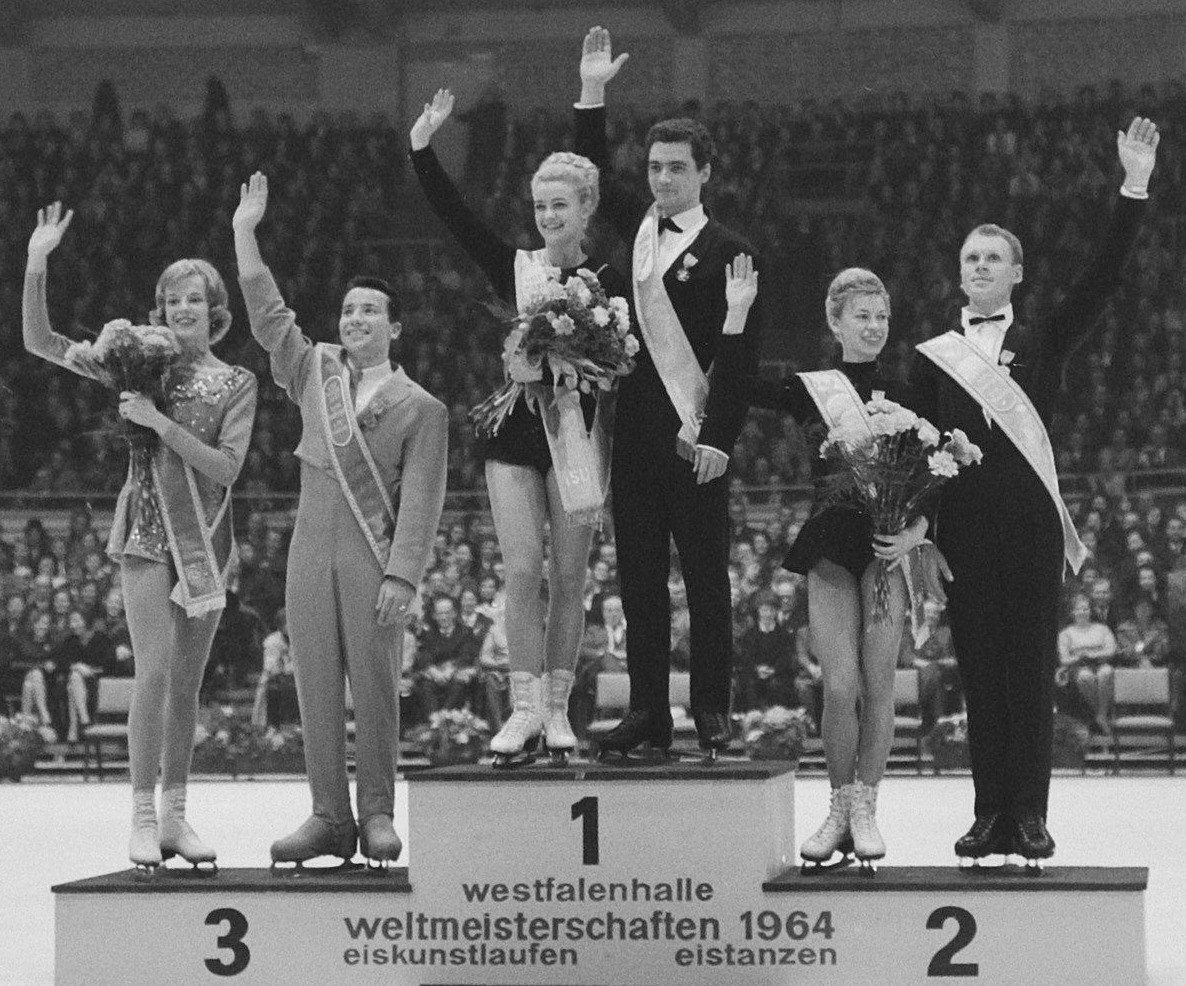
1964 World Figure Skating Championships, pairs podium

Rank	Name	Places
1	(West Germany) Marika Kilius / Hans-Jürgen Bäumler	13
2	(Soviet Union) Lyudmila Belousova / Oleg Protopopov	14
3	(Canada) Debbi Wilkes / Guy Revell	28
4	(United States) Vivian Joseph / Ronald Joseph	35
5	(West Germany) Sonja Pfersdorf / Günther Matzdorf	50
6	(Soviet Union) Tatyana Zhuk / Aleksandr Gavrilov	53
7	(United States) Cynthia Kauffman / Ronald Kauffman	71
8	(United States) Judianne Fotheringill / Jerry Fotheringill	73
9	(West Germany) Sigrid Riechmann / Wolfgang Danne	79
10	(Czechoslovakia) Agnesa Wlachovská / Peter Bartosiewicz	85
11	(Austria) Gerlinde Schönbauer / Wilhelm Bietak	100
12	(Hungary) Mária Csordás / László Kondi	102

Judges:

- (Hungary) Zoltán Balázs
- (West Germany) K. Beyer
- (Italy) Ercole Cattaneo
- (Switzerland) Karl Enderlin
- (Soviet Union) Georgiy Felitsyn
- (Czechoslovakia) Zdeněk Fikar
- (Canada) Donald Gilchrist
- (Austria) Hans Meixner
- (United States) Mary Wright

=== Ice dance ===
Rank	Name	Places
1	(Czechoslovakia) Eva Romanová / Pavel Roman	8
2	(Canada) Paulette Doan / Kenneth Ormsby	18
3	(United Kingdom) Janet Sawbridge / David Hickinbottom	20
4	(United Kingdom) Yvonne Suddick / Roger Kennerson	29
5	(United States) Lorna Dyer / John Carrell	39
6	(United States) Carole MacSween / Robert Munz	46
7	(Canada) Carole Forrest / Kevin Lethbridge	59
8	(United States) Darlene Streich / Charles Fetter	59
9	(Hungary) Györgyi Korda / Pál Vásárhelyi	68
10	(Czechoslovakia) Jitka Babická / Jaromír Holan	74.5
11	(Canada) Marilyn Crawford / Blair Armitage	77
12	(Austria) Christel Trebesiner / Georg Felsinger	88.5
13	(United Kingdom) Diane Towler / Bernard Ford	88
14	(West Germany) Gabriele Rauch / Rudi Matysik	89
15	(France) Brigitte Martin / Francis Gamichon	93
16	(Netherlands) Jopie Wolf / Nico Wolf	109

Judges:

- (Canada) P. Devine
- (Czechoslovakia) Miroslav Hasenöhrl
- (Austria) F. Huniacek
- (Hungary) Klára Kozári
- (United Kingdom) H. Lawrence
- (West Germany) Erika Schiechtl
- (United States) Mary Wright
