= Figure Skating Club of Minneapolis =

Skating club

The Figure Skating Club of Minneapolis
- Formation: 1921
- Location: Minneapolis, Minnesota
- President: Debbie Tallen
- Website: www.fscmpls.org
- Formerly called: Twin City Figure Skating Club

The Figure Skating Club of Minneapolis is a not-for-profit figure skating club based in Minneapolis, Minnesota. Formed as the Twin City Figure Skating Club in 1921, and one of the six still-extant founding members of U.S. Figure Skating, the governing body for the sport in the United States, the club was reorganized and incorporated as the Figure Skating Club of Minneapolis in 1929. The club is based at the Augsburg Ice Arena on the campus of Augsburg University in Minneapolis.

== Club activities ==
An annual competition, the Robin Lee Midwest Open, is held each summer. Named for five-time national men's champion and club member Robin Lee, the three-day competition draws hundreds of skaters from across the upper midwest. Each spring the club produces an ice show with skaters from both the club and its Learn to Skate program. In collaboration with the Braemar Figure Skating Club, the Figure Skating Club of Minneapolis fields Braemar Panache, which is a synchronized skating organization with several teams. The Club runs a Learn to Skate program year-round, as well as a summer camp for beginning figure skaters, and provides clinics, development programs, and power courses for club members.

== Notable Members ==
In its nearly 100 years, the Figure Skating Club of Minneapolis has produced several national and international competitors. Some of these skaters are:

- Chris Christenson, 1926 National Men's Champion and first president of the Figure Skating Club of Minneapolis
- Robin Lee, 1935-1939 National Sr. Men's Champion
- Mary Louise Premer, Janette Ahrens, Robert Uppgren, and Lyman Wakefield, 1940 National Fours Champions
- Harriet Sutton Hield and John Lettengarver, 1947 National Jr. Pairs Champions
- Janet Gerhauser, Marilyn Thompson, Marlyn Thompson, and John Nightingale, 1947-1949 National Fours Champions
- Mary Ann Dorsey, 1952 National Novice Ladies Champion and 1956 World Team member
- Kelsy Ufford, 1976 National Novice Ladies Champion and 1978 World Team alternate
- Jana Sjodin, 1983 National Jr. Ladies competitor
