= North American Figure Skating Championships =

Defunct ice skating competition

- Status: Defunct
- Genre: International championship event
- Frequency: Biennial
- Countries: Canada; United States
- Years active: 1923–71
- Inaugurated: 1923
- Organizer: Canadian Figure Skating Association; United States Figure Skating Association

The North American Figure Skating Championships were a biennial figure skating competition, which took place between 1923 and 1971. Although sanctioned by the International Skating Union (ISU), they were actually a joint venture of the Canadian Figure Skating Association and the United States Figure Skating Association. The first North American Championships were held in 1923 in Ottawa, Canada, and featured men's singles, women's singles, pair skating, and four skating. The championships were held every other year, with Canada and the United States alternating as hosts, as only skaters from those countries were eligible to compete. The championships were interrupted only once, in 1943, due to World War II. Ice dance was added as an event in 1947, while four skating was retired after 1949. The last edition was held in Peterborough, Canada, in 1971, after which Canada discontinued their involvement in order to launch their own international competition, the Skate Canada International.

Montgomery Wilson of Canada holds the record for winning the most North American Championship titles in men's singles (with six), his sister Constance Wilson-Samuel holds the record in women's singles (with four), and the two hold the record in pair skating (with three). Four teams are tied for winning the most titles in ice dance (with two each): Carmel Bodel and Edward Bodel of the United States, Lorna Dyer and John Carrell of the United States, Lois Waring and Walter Bainbridge of the United States, and Geraldine Fenton and William McLachlan of Canada. McLachlan also won a third ice dance title with a previous partner.

== History ==
In 1914, the International Skating Union of America – a joint venture of the Canadian Figure Skating Association and the United States Figure Skating Association – hosted their first championship event in New Haven, Connecticut. The second championship event was held in 1918 in New York City, and was attended by skaters from England and the United States, but not from Canada. The last two competitions, held in 1920 and 1921, were attended only by skaters from the United States.

Beginning in 1923, the Canadian Figure Skating Association and the U.S. Figure Skating Association joined together to launch the North American Championships: a soft relaunch of these earlier competitions. At this time, medal contenders at the World Figure Skating Championships and the Winter Olympics came from either Europe or North America. Though the North American Championships were sanctioned by the International Skating Union (ISU), they were jointly organized and run by the Canadian and U.S. skating federations, and they allowed Canadian and American skaters the opportunity to compete at a comparable event to the European Figure Skating Championships. The championships were held every other year, with Canada and the United States alternating as hosts, and only skaters from those countries were eligible to compete.

The 1943 North American Championships were cancelled due to World War II, while the 1945 competition, held concurrently with the U.S. Figure Skating Championships in New York City, featured only the women's event. Ice dance was added as an event in 1947, while four skating was last held in 1949.

On February 15, 1961, most of the U.S. national team, many of whom had just finished competing at the North American Championships in Philadelphia, departed from New York City aboard Sabena Flight 548 bound for the World Figure Skating Championships in Prague. The airplane crashed while on approach to Brussels Airport in Belgium. All sixty-one passengers and eleven crew members aboard the flight were killed, including the eighteen members of the U.S. national team as well as fourteen family members, coaches, and skating officials who were accompanying them. Among those killed were the recently crowned North American women's champion Laurence Owen, men's silver medalist Bradley Lord, men's bronze medalist Gregory Kelley, pairs silver medalists Maribel Owen and Dudley Richards, and ice dance silver medalists Dona Lee Carrier and Roger Campbell. Nine-time U.S. champion and coach Maribel Vinson-Owen, mother of both Laurence and Maribel, was on the flight as well. Out of respect, the World Championships were cancelled the next day.

The North American Championships developed an unusual judging system in which there were an even number of judges, rather than the typical odd number. This was meant to keep the atmosphere of the competition friendly. However, the ISU insisted that the North American Championships follow its regulations, which stated that competitions must have an odd number of judges. As a compromise, the two Associations decided that the event would be held with seven judges, with four being from the host country. This led to the Canadian Figure Skating Association alleging both sides showed judging bias at the 1969 event. While it was proposed that either the event could bring in European judges or expand to include another country, such as Japan, both ideas was deemed too expensive, as the event did not bring in much revenue.

Before the 1971 event, the Canadian Figure Skating Association heard that the United States planned to send neither Janet Lynn, the national champion, nor Julie Lynn Holmes, the national silver medalist. Lynn agreed to compete after the U.S. Figure Skating Association was contacted, but the Canadian Figure Skating Association was upset that the U.S. had originally intended not to send its top skaters. Additionally, the 1972 World Championships were held in Calgary, and the event was a much greater financial success than the North American Championships had been.

At a planning meeting held in 1972 and attended by representatives from both the Canadian Figure Skating Association and the U.S. Figure Skating Association, the Canadian delegation announced their plans to withdraw from the North American Championships. With one of the two participating nations out, this effectively marked the end of the championships. The U.S. delegation was unaware at the time that the Canadian Figure Skating Association was already planning to launch its own international skating competition, Skate Canada, which debuted the next year. The U.S. Figure Skating Association eventually launched their own international event as well: Skate America.

By the mid-1970s, skaters from Asia were successfully competing at major international events and skaters from Europe had the advantage of an ISU championship event that was not accessible to skaters outside of Europe. In order to provide equal opportunities for all skaters, the ISU established the Four Continents Figure Skating Championships in 1999; the name referred to the four continents outside of Europe where competitive figure skating took place: Africa, Asia, Australia (Oceania), and North America.

== Medalists ==
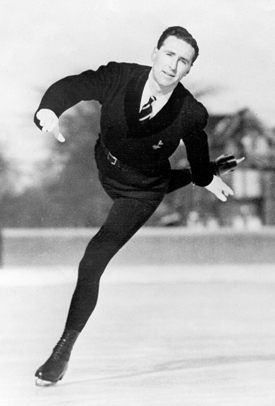
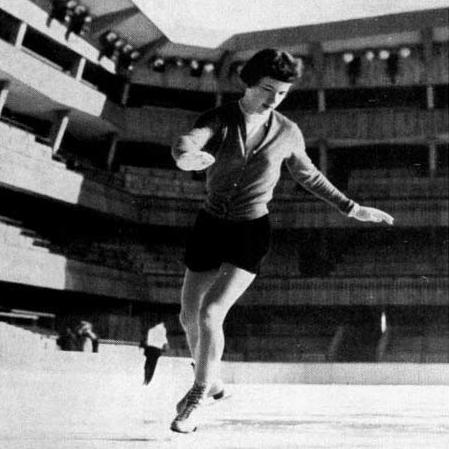
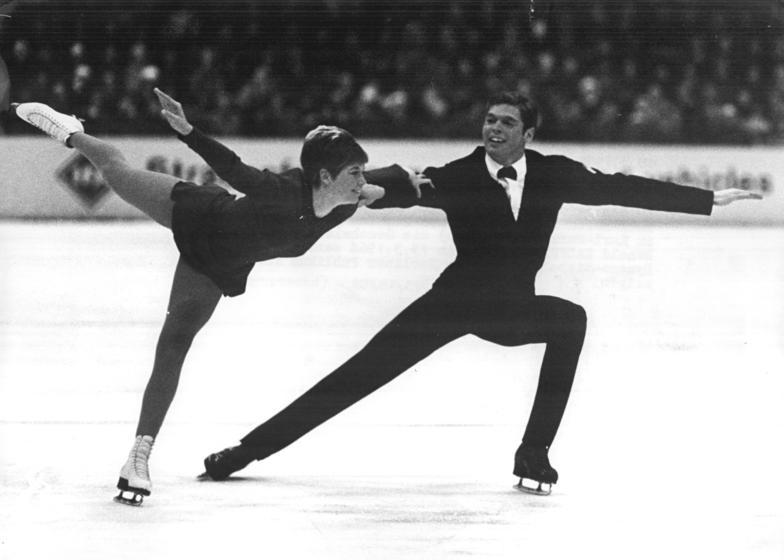
From left to right: Montgomery Wilson of Canada, six-time North American champion in men's singles; Tenley Albright of the United States, two-time North American champion in women's singles; and Cynthia Kauffmann and Ronald Kauffman of the United States, two-time North American champions in pair skating

=== Men's singles ===
Men's event medalists
Year	Location	Gold	Silver	Bronze	Ref.
1923	(Canada) Ottawa	(United States) Sherwin Badger	(Canada) Melville Rogers	No other competitors	
1925	(United States) Boston	(Canada) Melville Rogers	(United States) Nathaniel Niles	No other competitors	
1927	(Canada) Toronto	(Canada) Melville Rogers	(United States) Sherwin Badger	(Canada) Montgomery Wilson	
1929	(United States) Boston	(Canada) Montgomery Wilson	(United States) Roger Turner	(United States) Frederick Goodridge	
1931	(Canada) Ottawa	(Canada) Montgomery Wilson	(United States) James Madden	(United States) Gail Borden	
1933	(United States) New York City	(Canada) Montgomery Wilson	(United States) James Madden	(United States) Robin Lee	
1935	(Canada) Montreal	(Canada) Montgomery Wilson	(United States) Robin Lee	(United States) James Madden	
1937	(United States) Boston	(Canada) Montgomery Wilson	(United States) Roger Turner	(Canada) Ralph McCreath	
1939	(Canada) Toronto	(Canada) Montgomery Wilson	(United States) Robin Lee	(Canada) Ralph McCreath	
1941	(United States) Philadelphia	(Canada) Ralph McCreath	(United States) Eugene Turner	(United States) William Grimditch Jr.	
1943	No competition due to World War II				
1945	(United States) New York City	No men's competition due to World War II			
1947	(Canada) Ottawa	(United States) Dick Button	(United States) James Grogan	(Canada) Wallace Diestelmeyer	
1949	(United States) Philadelphia	(United States) Dick Button	(United States) James Grogan	(United States) Hayes Alan Jenkins	
1951	(Canada) Calgary	(United States) Dick Button	(United States) James Grogan	(United States) Hayes Alan Jenkins	
1953	(United States) Cleveland	(United States) Hayes Alan Jenkins	(Canada) Peter Firstbrook	(United States) Ronnie Robertson	
1955	(Canada) Regina	(United States) Hayes Alan Jenkins	(United States) David Jenkins	(Canada) Charles Snelling	
1957	(United States) Rochester	(United States) David Jenkins	(Canada) Charles Snelling	(United States) Tim Brown	
1959	(Canada) Toronto	(Canada) Donald Jackson	(United States) Tim Brown	(United States) Robert Brewer	
1961	(United States) Philadelphia	(Canada) Donald Jackson	(United States) Bradley Lord	(United States) Gregory Kelley	
1963	(Canada) Vancouver	(Canada) Donald McPherson	(United States) Thomas Litz	(United States) Scott Allen	
1965	(United States) Rochester	(United States) Gary Visconti	(United States) Scott Allen	(Canada) Donald Knight	
1967	(Canada) Montreal	(Canada) Donald Knight	(United States) Scott Allen	(United States) Gary Visconti	
1969	(United States) Oakland	(United States) Tim Wood	(Canada) Jay Humphry	(United States) John Misha Petkevich	
1971	(Canada) Peterborough	(United States) John Misha Petkevich	(Canada) Toller Cranston	(United States) Ken Shelley	

=== Women's singles ===
Women's event medalists
Year	Location	Gold	Silver	Bronze	Ref.
1923	(Canada) Ottawa	(United States) Theresa Weld-Blanchard	(United States) Beatrix Loughran	(Canada) Dorothy Jenkins	
1925	(United States) Boston	(United States) Beatrix Loughran	(Canada) Cecil Smith	(United States) Theresa Weld-Blanchard	
1927	(Canada) Toronto	(United States) Beatrix Loughran	(Canada) Constance Wilson	(Canada) Cecil Smith	
1929	(United States) Boston	(Canada) Constance Wilson-Samuel	(United States) Maribel Vinson	(United States) Suzanne Davis	
1931	(Canada) Ottawa	(Canada) Constance Wilson-Samuel	(Canada) Elizabeth Fisher	(United States) Edith Secord	
1933	(United States) New York City	(Canada) Constance Wilson-Samuel	(Canada) Cecil Gooderham	(United States) Suzanne Davis	
1935	(Canada) Montreal	(Canada) Constance Wilson-Samuel	(United States) Maribel Vinson	(United States) Suzanne Davis	
1937	(United States) Boston	(United States) Maribel Vinson	(Canada) Veronica Clarke	(Canada) Eleanor O'Meara	
1939	(Canada) Toronto	(Canada) Mary Rose Thacker	(United States) Joan Tozzer	(Canada) Norah McCarthy	
1941	(United States) Philadelphia	(Canada) Mary Rose Thacker	(Canada) Eleanor O'Meara	(Canada) Norah McCarthy	
1943	No competition due to World War II				
1945	(United States) New York City	(Canada) Barbara Ann Scott	(United States) Gretchen Merrill	(United States) Janette Ahrens	
1947	(Canada) Ottawa	(Canada) Barbara Ann Scott	(United States) Janette Ahrens	(United States) Yvonne Sherman	
1949	(United States) Philadelphia	(United States) Yvonne Sherman	(Canada) Marlene Smith	(United States) Virginia Baxter	
1951	(Canada) Calgary	(United States) Sonya Klopfer	(Canada) Suzanne Morrow	(United States) Tenley Albright	
1953	(United States) Cleveland	(United States) Tenley Albright	(United States) Carol Heiss	(Canada) Barbara Gratton	
1955	(Canada) Regina	(United States) Tenley Albright	(United States) Carol Heiss	(United States) Patricia Firth	
1957	(United States) Rochester	(United States) Carol Heiss	(Canada) Carole Jane Pachl	(United States) Joan Schenke	
1959	(Canada) Toronto	(United States) Carol Heiss	(United States) Lynn Finnegan	(United States) Nancy Heiss	
1961	(United States) Philadelphia	(United States) Laurence Owen	(Canada) Wendy Griner	(Canada) Sonia Snelling	
1963	(Canada) Vancouver	(Canada) Wendy Griner	(Canada) Petra Burka	(Canada) Shirra Kenworthy	
1965	(United States) Rochester	(Canada) Petra Burka	(United States) Peggy Fleming	(Canada) Valerie Jones	
1967	(Canada) Montreal	(United States) Peggy Fleming	(Canada) Valerie Jones	(United States) Tina Noyes	
1969	(United States) Oakland	(United States) Janet Lynn	(Canada) Karen Magnussen	(Canada) Linda Carbonetto	
1971	(Canada) Peterborough	(Canada) Karen Magnussen	(United States) Janet Lynn	(United States) Suna Murray	

=== Pairs ===
Pairs event medalists
Year	Location	Gold	Silver	Bronze	Ref.
1923	(Canada) Ottawa	(Canada); Dorothy Jenkins; Gordon McClennan	(United States); Theresa Weld-Blanchard; Nathaniel Niles	(United States); Clara Frothingham; Charles Rotch	
1925	(United States) Boston	(United States); Theresa Weld-Blanchard; Nathaniel Niles	(Canada); Gladys Rogers; Melville Rogers	No other competitors	
1927	(Canada) Toronto	(Canada); Marion McDougall; Chauncey Bangs	(United States); Theresa Weld-Blanchard; Nathaniel Niles	(Canada); Constance Wilson; Montgomery Wilson	
1929	(United States) Boston	(Canada); Constance Wilson-Samuel; Montgomery Wilson	(United States); Theresa Weld-Blanchard; Nathaniel Niles	(United States); Maribel Vinson; Thornton Coolidge	
1931	(Canada) Ottawa	(Canada); Constance Wilson-Samuel; Montgomery Wilson	(Canada); Frances Claudet; Chauncey Bangs	(United States); Beatrix Loughran; Sherwin Badger	
1933	(United States) New York City	(Canada); Constance Wilson-Samuel; Montgomery Wilson	(Canada); Maud Smith; Jack Eastwood	(Canada); Kathleen Lopdell; Donald Cruikshank	
1935	(Canada) Montreal	(United States); Maribel Vinson; George Hill	(Canada); Constance Wilson-Samuel; Montgomery Wilson	(Canada); Louise Bertram; Stewart Reburn	
1937	(United States) Boston	(Canada); Veronica Clarke; Ralph McCreath	(United States); Maribel Vinson; George Hill	(United States); Grace Madden; James Madden	
1939	(Canada) Toronto	(United States); Joan Tozzer; Bernard Fox	(Canada); Norah McCarthy; Ralph McCreath	(Canada); Aidrie Cruikshank; Donald Cruikshank	
1941	(United States) Philadelphia	(Canada); Eleanor O'Meara; Ralph McCreath	(United States); Donna Atwood; Eugene Turner	(United States); Patricia Vaeth; Jack Might	
1943	No competition due to World War II				
1945	(United States) New York City	No pairs competition due to World War II			
1947	(Canada) Ottawa	(Canada); Suzanne Morrow; Wallace Distelmeyer	(United States); Yvonne Sherman; Robert Swenning	(United States); Karol Kennedy; Peter Kennedy	
1949	(United States) Philadelphia	(United States); Karol Kennedy; Peter Kennedy	(Canada); Marlene Smith; Donald Gilchrist	(United States); Irene Maguire; Walter Muehlbronner	
1951	(Canada) Calgary	(United States); Karol Kennedy; Peter Kennedy	(United States); Janet Gerhauser; John Nightingale	(Canada); Jane Kirby; Donald Tobin	
1953	(United States) Cleveland	(Canada); Frances Dafoe; Norris Bowden	(United States); Carole Ormaca; Robin Greiner	(United States); Margaret Anne Graham; Hugh Graham	
1955	(Canada) Regina	(Canada); Frances Dafoe; Norris Bowden	(United States); Carole Ormaca; Robin Greiner	(Canada); Barbara Wagner; Robert Paul	
1957	(United States) Rochester	(Canada); Barbara Wagner; Robert Paul	(Canada); Maria Jelinek; Otto Jelinek	(United States); Nancy Rouillard; Ronald Ludington	
1959	(Canada) Toronto	(Canada); Barbara Wagner; Robert Paul	(United States); Nancy Rouillard; Ronald Ludington	(United States); Maribel Owen; Dudley Richards	
1961	(United States) Philadelphia	(Canada); Maria Jelinek; Otto Jelinek	(United States); Maribel Owen; Dudley Richards	(Canada); Debbi Wilkes; Guy Revell	
1963	(Canada) Vancouver	(Canada); Debbi Wilkes; Guy Revell	(Canada); Gertrude Desjardins; Maurice Lafrance	(United States); Vivian Joseph; Ronald Joseph	
1965	(United States) Rochester	(United States); Vivian Joseph; Ronald Joseph	(United States); Cynthia Kauffman; Ronald Kauffman	(Canada); Susan Huehnergard; Paul Huehnergard	
1967	(Canada) Montreal	(United States); Cynthia Kauffman; Ronald Kauffman	(United States); Susan Berens; Roy Wagelein	(United States); Betty Jean Lewis; Richard Gilbert	
1969	(United States) Oakland	(United States); Cynthia Kauffman; Ronald Kauffman	(United States); JoJo Starbuck; Ken Shelley	(Canada); Mary Petrie; Robert McAvoy	
1971	(Canada) Peterborough	(United States); JoJo Starbuck; Ken Shelley	(United States); Melissa Militano; Mark Militano	(Canada); Sandra Bezic; Val Bezic	

=== Ice dance ===
Ice dance event medalists
Year	Location	Gold	Silver	Bronze	Ref.
1947	(Canada) Ottawa	(United States); Lois Waring; Walter Bainbridge	(United States); Ann Davies; Carleton Hoffner Jr.	(United States); Marcella May Willis; Frank Davenport	
1949	(United States) Philadelphia	(United States); Lois Waring; Walter Bainbridge	(United States); Irene Maguire; Walter Muehlbronner	(United States); Ann Davies; Carleton Hoffner Jr.	
1951	(Canada) Calgary	(United States); Carmel Bodel; Edward Bodel	(United States); Carol Ann Peters; Daniel Ryan	(Canada); Pierette Paquin; Donald Tobin	
1953	(United States) Cleveland	(United States); Carol Ann Peters; Daniel Ryan	(United States); Virginia Hoyns; Donald Jacoby	(United States); Carmel Bodel; Edward Bodel	
1955	(Canada) Regina	(United States); Carmel Bodel; Edward Bodel	(United States); Joan Zamboni; Roland Junso	(United States); Virginia Hoyns; William Kipp	
1957	(United States) Rochester	(Canada); Geraldine Fenton; William McLachlan	(United States); Joan Zamboni; Roland Junso	(United States); Sharon McKenzie; Bert Wright	
1959	(Canada) Toronto	(Canada); Geraldine Fenton; William McLachlan	(United States); Andree Jacoby; Donald Jacoby	(Canada); Anne Martin; Edward Collins	
1961	(United States) Philadelphia	(Canada); Virginia Thompson; William McLachlan	(United States); Dona Lee Carrier; Roger Campbell	(Canada); Paulette Doan; Kenneth Ormsby	
1963	(Canada) Vancouver	(Canada); Paulette Doan; Kenneth Ormsby	(Canada); Donna Mitchell; John Mitchell	(United States); Sally Schantz; Stanley Urban	
1965	(United States) Rochester	(United States); Lorna Dyer; John Carrell	(United States); Kristin Fortune; Dennis Sveum	(Canada); Carole Forrest; Kevin Lethbridge	
1967	(Canada) Montreal	(United States); Lorna Dyer; John Carrell	(Canada); Joni Graham; Don Phillips	(United States); Judy Schwomeyer; James Sladky	
1969	(United States) Oakland	(Canada); Donna Taylor; Bruce Lennie	(United States); Judy Schwomeyer; James Sladky	(United States); Debbie Gerken; Raymond Tiedemann	
1971	(Canada) Peterborough	(United States); Judy Schwomeyer; James Sladky	(United States); Anne Millier; Harvey Millier	(United States); Mary Karen Campbell; Johnny Johns	

=== Four skating ===
Fours event medalists
Year	Location	Gold	Silver	Bronze	Ref.
1923	(Canada) Ottawa	(Canada): Elizabeth Blair; Florence Wilson; Philip Chrysler; C.R. Morphy	(United States): Clara Hartman; Grace Munstock; Paul Armitage; Joel Liberman	(United States): Clara Frothingham; Theresa Weld-Blanchard; Charles Rotch; Sherwin Badger	
1925–29	No fours competitions held				
1931	(Canada) Ottawa	(Canada): Frances Claudet; Kathleen Lopdell; Melville Rogers; Guy Owen	(Canada): Cecil Smith; Maude Smith; Stewart Reburn; Jack Eastwood	(Canada): Mary Littlejohn; Elizabeth Fisher; Hubert Sprott; Jack Hose	
1933	(United States) New York City	(Canada): Margaret Davis; Prudence Holbrook; Melville Rogers; Guy Owen	(Canada): Constance Wilson-Samuel; Elizabeth Fisher; Montgomery Wilson; Hubert Sprott	(United States): Theresa Weld-Blanchard; Suzanne Davis; Richard Hapgood; Fred Parmenter	
1935	(Canada) Montreal	(Canada): Margaret Davis; Prudence Holbrook; Melville Rogers; Guy Owen	(United States): Nettie Prantel; Ardelle Kloss; Joseph Savage; Roy Hunt	(United States): Suzanne Davis; Grace Madden; Frederick Goodridge; George Hill	
1937	(United States) Boston	(Canada): Margaret Davis; Prudence Holbrook; Melville Rogers; Guy Owen	(Canada): Naomi Slater; Aidrie Cruikshank; Jack Hose; Donald Cruikshank	(United States): Nettie Prantel; Ardelle Kloss; Joseph Savage; George Boltres	
1939	(Canada) Toronto	(Canada): Dorothy Caley; Hazel Caley; Ralph McCreath; Montgomery Wilson	(Canada): Gillian Watson; Ruth Hall; Sandy McKechnie; Donald Gilchrist	(United States): Nettie Prantel; Marjorie Parker; Joseph Savage; George Boltres	
1941	(United States) Philadelphia	(United States): Janette Ahrens; Mary Louise Premer; Robert Uppgren; Lyman Wakefield Jr.	(Canada): Therese McCarthy; Virginia Wilson; Donald Gilchrist; Michael Kirby	No other competitors	
1943	No competition due to World War II				
1945	(United States) New York City	No fours competition due to World War II			
1947	(Canada) Ottawa	No fours competition held			
1949	(United States) Philadelphia	(United States): Janet Gerhauser; Marilyn Thomsen; John Nightingale; Marlyn Thomsen	(Canada): Mary Kenner; Vera Smith; Peter Dunfield; Peter Firstbrook	(United States): Jean Matzke; Elizabeth Royer; Newbold Black IV; Henry Mayer IV	

== Records ==
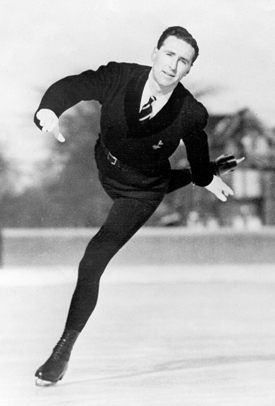
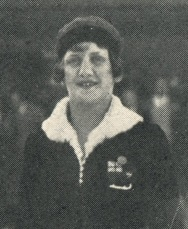
Siblings Montgomery Wilson and Constance Wilson-Samuel of Canada hold the records for winning the most North American Championship titles in men's singles (with six), women's singles (with four), and pair skating (with three).

Records
Discipline	Most championship titles			
Discipline	Skater(s)	No.	Years	Ref.
Men's singles	(Canada); Montgomery Wilson	6	1929, 1931, 1933, 1935, 1937, 1939	
Women's singles	(Canada); Constance Wilson-Samuel	4	1929, 1931, 1933, 1935	
Pairs	(Canada); Constance Wilson-Samuel; Montgomery Wilson	3	1929, 1931, 1933	
Ice dance	(United States); Carmel Bodel; Edward Bodel	2	1951, 1955	
Ice dance	(United States); Lorna Dyer; John Carrell	2	1965, 1967	
Ice dance	(Canada); Geraldine Fenton; William McLachlan	2	1957, 1959	
Ice dance	(Canada); William McLachlan; (Note: William McLachlan won two championship titles while partnered with Geraldine Fenton (1957, 1959) and one with Virginia Thompson (1961).)	3	1957, 1959, 1961	
Ice dance	(United States); Lois Waring; Walter Bainbridge	2	1947, 1949	

== Cumulative medal count ==
Total number of North American Championship medals by nation
Rank	Nation	Gold	Silver	Bronze	Total
1	Canada	49	34	31	114
2	United States	42	57	56	155
Totals (2 entries)		91	91	87	269

== Works cited ==
- Hines, James R. (2006). Figure Skating: A History. University of Illinois Press. ISBN 978-0-252-07286-4.
- Hines, James R. (2015). Figure Skating in the Formative Years. University of Illinois Press. ISBN 978-0-252-03906-5.
