= Janette Ahrens =

American figure skater (1925–2016)

Personal information
- Born: December 10, 1925 Saint Paul, Minnesota
- Died: April 24, 2016 (aged 90) Mahtomedi, Minnesota

Figure skating career
- Country: United States
Medal record
Representing United States
Ladies' Figure skating
North American Championships
Bronze medal – third place	1947 Ottawa	Ladies' singles
Silver medal – second place	1945 New York	Ladies' singles
Fours' Figure skating
North American Championships
Gold medal – first place	1941 Philadelphia	Fours

Janette Louise Buckbee (née Ahrens, December 10, 1925 – April 24, 2016), also known as Deedee Ahrens, was an American figure skater.

== Life and career ==
Ahrens was born in Saint Paul, Minnesota on December 10, 1925. She attended the University of Minnesota during the 1940s. Ahrens competed as both a single and pair skater, first with partner Robert Uppgren and later with Arthur Preusch. She also competed in fours with Uppgren, Mary Louise Premer, and Lyman Wakefield Jr. and won the 1941 North American title. They were called the "St. Louis Four" and were the first team in history that defeated Canada. After becoming a professional skater, she taught skating.

Ahrens married Norman Simmons DeCoster in 1947; they divorced and she married Allen Buckbee in December 1985. During the 1970s, Ahrens lived in Minneapolis, Minnesota, but later resided in White Bear Lake. She died in Mahtomedi, Minnesota on April 24, 2016, at the age of 90.

== Competitive highlights ==
=== Ladies' singles ===
Event	1941	1942	1943	1945	1946	1947
World Championships						6th
North American Championships				2nd		3rd
U.S. Championships	9th J	2nd J	3rd	2nd	2nd	2nd

=== Pair skating ===
(with Uppgren)

Event	1942	1943
U.S. Championships	2nd	2nd

(with Preusch)

Event	1944
U.S. Championships	2nd

=== Four skating ===
(with Premer, Uppgren, and Wakefield)

Event	1941
North American Championships	1st
