= Valérie Jones =

Canadian figure skater

Valerie Jones
Personal information
- Other names: Bartlett
- Born: September 7, 1948 (age 77)

Figure skating career
- Country: Canada
- Coach: Ellen Burka, Sheldon Galbraith
- Skating club: Toronto Cricket, Skating and Curling Club
- Retired: 1967
Medal record
Representing Canada
Figure skating: Ladies' singles
North American Championships
Silver medal – second place	1967 Montreal	Ladies' singles
Bronze medal – third place	1965 Rochester	Ladies' singles

Valerie Jones is a Canadian former figure skater. She is a two-time North American medalist (silver in 1967, bronze in 1965) and the 1967 Canadian national champion.

== Results ==
International
Event	1962	1963	1965	1966	1967
World Championships			7th	4th	4th
North American Champ.			3rd		2nd
National
Canadian Championships	1st J	4th	2nd	2nd	1st
