= Chris Christenson =

American figure skater

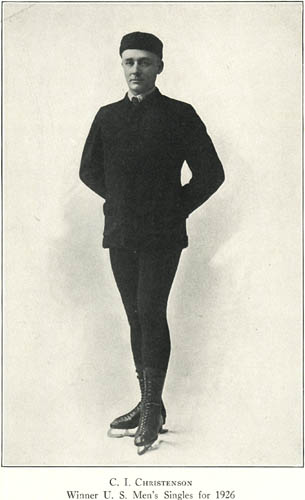

Personal information
- Full name: Chris I. Christenson
- Born: 1875
- Died: 1943 (aged 67–68)

Figure skating career
- Country: United States
- Discipline: Men's singles
- Skating club: Twin City FSC

Chris I. Christenson (1875–1943) was an American figure skater. He won the United States Figure Skating Championships in 1926 at 51 years old and he remains the oldest U.S. men's champion in history.

Chris Christenson was born in Norway. He and his family emigrated to the United States when he was eight years old, settling first in Wisconsin and later in St. Paul, Minnesota. He began figure skating in 1914 at age 39. He joined the Twin City Figure Skating Club (which became the Figure Skating Club of Minneapolis in 1929). Christenson went to the national championships six times between 1920 and 1926. In 1923 he was runner-up (Silver), in 1924 he finished in third place (Bronze) and in 1926 at Boston he won first place (Gold).

== Results ==
| Event | 1923 | 1924 | 1925 | 1926 | 1927 |
|---|---|---|---|---|---|
| U.S. Championships | 2nd | 3rd | 4th | 1st | 4th |
