= Vivian Joseph =

American pair skater

Personal information
- Born: March 7, 1948 (age 78) Chicago, Illinois, United States
- Height: 5 ft 2.5 in (159 cm)

Figure skating career
- Country: United States
- Retired: 1965
Medal record
Representing United States
Figure skating: Pairs
Olympic Games
Bronze medal – third place	1964 Innsbruck	Pairs
World Championships
Silver medal – second place	1965 Colorado Springs	Pairs
North American Championships
Gold medal – first place	1965 Rochester	Pairs
Bronze medal – third place	1963 Vancouver	Pairs

Vivian Joseph (born March 7, 1948) is an American former pair skater who competed with her brother, Ronald Joseph. They are the 1964 Olympic bronze medalists, 1965 World silver medalists, and 1965 North American champions.

== Personal life ==
Vivian Joseph was born on March 7, 1948, in Chicago, Illinois, and is the younger sister of Ronald Joseph. She is Jewish.

== Career ==
The Josephs began competing together by the late 1950s and became the U.S. national junior champions in 1961. They won the senior bronze medal in 1962 and silver the following year. They were assigned to the 1963 North American Championships, where they took the bronze medal, and to the 1963 World Championships, where they placed eighth.

The Josephs were selected to represent the United States at the 1964 Winter Olympics in Innsbruck and initially finished fourth. A few years later, the silver medalists, Marika Kilius / Hans-Jürgen Bäumler of Germany, were disqualified after they were accused of signing a pro contract before the Olympics. The original bronze medalists, Debbi Wilkes / Guy Revell of Canada, were elevated to silver and the Joseph siblings to bronze. When the German pair was reinstated in 1987, the IOC decided the Germans and Canadians were both silver medalists and the Americans remained bronze medalists. The IOC officially updated the results in November 2014.

The Josephs won the national senior title in 1965. They then took gold at the 1965 North American Championships and silver at the 1965 World Championships before retiring from competition. They were coached by Peter Dunfield.

== Results ==
(pairs with Ronald Joseph)

International
Event	1960	1961	1962	1963	1964	1965
Winter Olympics					3rd	
World Championships				8th	4th	2nd
North American Championships				3rd		1st
National
U.S. Championships	2nd J.	1st J.	3rd	2nd	2nd	1st
J. = Junior level

== See also ==
- List of select Jewish figure skaters
