= Franklin Nelson =

American ice dancer (1933–2019)

Franklin S. Nelson (June 2, 1933 – February 6, 2019) was an American ice dancer from Tulsa, Oklahoma. Competing in partnership with Sidney Arnold, he was the 1956 U.S. national bronze medalist, and placed 7th at the 1956 World Figure Skating Championships in Garmisch-Partenkirchen, West Germany.

Nelson joined the U.S. Navy in 1956 after ending his skating career, and served for an initial two years. He then studied medicine at Harvard Medical School from where he graduated in 1961, before starting his career as a surgeon.

Although his competitive skating career ended relatively early, Nelson remained involved in figure skating for most of his life. He participated as an ISU referee and judge in numerous international competitions and ISU Championships. He was an ISU judge at the 1984 Winter Olympics in Sarajevo, Bosnia and Herzegovina (former SFR Yugoslavia). He served as president of the United States Figure Skating Association from 1989 to 1992. He was chairman of the ISU Medical Commission (medical advisory panel for the International Skating Union) from 1984 to 1989, and remained a member of the commission until 1998.

In 1990, Nelson re-enlisted in the Navy for his second tour of duty and worked at the Naval Hospital in Oakland, California. He was then deployed to the US Navy's hospital ship Mercy and posted to the Persian Gulf, where he served as a surgeon and Navy commander at the start of the Gulf War.

He was married to Polly Reid and had two children, a son called Reid and daughter Whitney Anne. Nelson died on February 6, 2019, at the age of 85. He had suffered from Alzheimer's disease towards the end of his life.

== Results ==
(with Sidney Arnold)

| Event | 1956 |
|---|---|
| World Championships | 7th |
| U.S. Championships | 3rd |
