= Sidney Arnold =

American figure skater (born 1933)

Sidney Ann Arnold (born 1933) is an American former figure skater. She competed in ice dance with Franklin Nelson. Her name was Sidney Foster before her marriage in July 1955 to ensign John Arnold.

== Results ==
(with Franklin Nelson)

Event	1956
World Championships	7th
U.S. Championships	3rd
