= Theresa Weld =

American figure skater

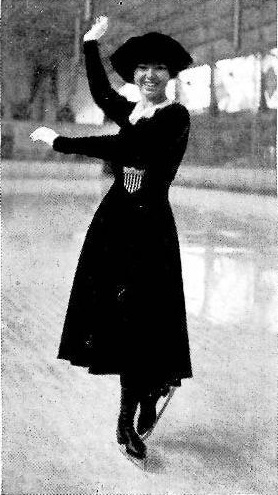

Personal information
- Other names: Theresa Weld Blanchard
- Born: August 21, 1893 Brookline, Massachusetts, U.S.
- Died: March 12, 1978 (aged 84) Brookline, Massachusetts, U.S.

Figure skating career
- Country: United States
- Skating club: SC of Boston
- Retired: 1934
Medal record
Representing the United States
Ladies' figure skating
Summer Olympic Games
Bronze medal – third place	1920 Antwerp	Ladies' singles
North American Championships
Bronze medal – third place	1925 Boston	Ladies' singles
Gold medal – first place	1923 Ottawa	Ladies' singles
Pairs Figure skating
North American Championships
Silver medal – second place	1929 Boston	Pairs
Silver medal – second place	1927 Toronto	Pairs
Gold medal – first place	1925 Boston	Pairs
Silver medal – second place	1923 Ottawa	Pairs

Theresa ("Tee") Weld Blanchard (August 21, 1893 – March 12, 1978) was an American figure skater who competed in the disciplines of single skating and pair skating. Her pairs partner was Nathaniel Niles. She has been called the "grande dame" of American figure skating. According to figure skating historian James R. Hines, she earned 32 medals in her career, "was a voice of encouragement to several generations of skaters, and was of assistance to many coaches".

As a singles skater, she won the gold medal at the U.S. Figure Skating Championships six times and competed three times in the Olympics, capturing a bronze medal in 1920. She came in first place in women's singles at three of the five regional championships held in the U.S. prior to and immediately after World War I. She was the first North American to win a medal at the Olympics. With Niles, she won the national pairs title nine times and also participated in the Olympics three times. After her marriage in 1920, she competed under her married name.

Blanchard was also the longtime volunteer editor of the United States Figure Skating Association's official publication, Skating magazine; first jointly with Niles from the magazine's founding in 1923, and then as sole editor after Niles's death in 1931, until 1963. The magazine was originally published from her home. Her long competitive career gave her many contacts throughout the skating world. She also served as the first chair of the association's Professionals Committee from 1937 to 1947.

== Results ==
=== Singles career ===
Event	1914	1918	1920	1921	1922	1923	1924	1925	1926	1927	1928
Olympic Games			3rd				4th				10th
North American Championships						1st		3rd			
U.S. Championships	1st	2nd	1st	1st	1st	1st	1st	2nd	2nd	3rd	

=== Pairs career ===
(with Niles)

Event	1914	1918	1920	1921	1922	1923	1924	1925	1926	1927	1928	1929	1930	1932
Olympic Games			4th				6th				9th			
World Championships											7th		6th	8th
North American Championships						2nd		1st		2nd		2nd		
U.S. Championships	2nd	1st	1st	1st	1st	1st	1st	1st	1st	1st	2nd	2nd		

== Sources ==
- Wright, Benjamin T. (1996). Skating in America (1921–1996): The 75th Anniversary History of the United States Figure Skating Association. Colorado Springs.
