= Wendy Griner =

Canadian figure skater

Personal information
- Full name: Wendy Elizabeth Griner
- Other names: Ballantyne
- Born: April 16, 1944 (age 82) Hamilton, Ontario, Canada
- Height: 1.56 m (5 ft 1 in)

Figure skating career
- Country: Canada
- Coach: Sheldon Galbraith
- Skating club: TCS & CC
- Retired: 1964
Medal record
Representing Canada
Figure skating: Women's singles
World Championships
Silver medal – second place	1962 Prague	Women's singles
North American Championships
Gold medal – first place	1963 Vancouver	Women's singles
Silver medal – second place	1961 Philadelphia	Ladies' singles

Wendy Elizabeth Griner, later surname: Ballantyne (born April 16, 1944) is a Canadian former figure skater who competed in women's singles. She is the 1962 World silver medallist, the 1963 North American champion, and a four-time (1960–63) Canadian national champion. She competed at the 1960 Winter Olympics in Squaw Valley and 1964 Winter Olympics in Innsbruck, placing 12th and 10th, respectively.

== Career ==
In 1959, Griner won the junior Canadian title. Skating magazine said she resembled Barbara Ann Scott both physically and in terms of skating style. In September, Griner was second at the Canadian Olympic trials behind Sandra Tewkesbury.

Griner won her first of four consecutive senior Canadian titles in 1960. She competed at the 1960 Winter Olympics, where she placed 12th. At her first World Championships that year, she came 7th. In 1961, at the North American Championships, she won the silver medal. Griner had intended to travel with the US figure skating team to the 1961 World Championships, along with several other Canadian skaters; however, they ended up taking a different flight. The flight the American skaters took, Sabena Flight 548, crashed, killing the entire team.

At eighteen years old, she won the silver medal at the 1962 World Championships, the first World medal won by a Canadian woman since Barbara Ann Scott. In 1963, she placed 4th at the World Championships and won the North American Championships.

Griner lost her Canadian title to Petra Burka in 1964, which she said lowered her morale. Competing at the 1964 Winter Olympics, Griner was in 18th place after a bad first day in the compulsory figures but moved up to end that segment in 13th. John Noel, writing for Skating magazine, praised her free skate as one of the most artistic of the competition, along with that of Nicole Hassler. She skated to Swan Lake and Méditation (Thaïs), and after double-footing her double Axel jump, she came in 8th place in that segment. Griner finished in 10th place overall.

She went on to place 11th at the 1964 World Championships. After the 1963–1964 season, she retired from competition to focus on her studies.

== Personal life ==
Griner has a brother, David, who played hockey. Besides skating, she also participated in swimming and tennis. She attended Branksome Hall.

After her competitive career, she married Don Ballantyne, with whom she has two sons and a daughter. They live in Thunder Bay, Canada.

== Competitive highlights ==
International
Event	1958	1959	1960	1961	1962	1963	1964
Winter Olympics			12th				10th
World Champ.			7th		2nd	4th	11th
North American Champ.				2nd		1st	
National
Canadian Champ.	3rd J	1st J	1st	1st	1st	1st	2nd
J: Junior level
