= Edward Bodel =

American figure skater

Edward Lee Bodel
Personal information
- Born: May 21, 1921 San Francisco, California, U.S.
- Died: May 17, 2008 (aged 86)

Figure skating career
- Country: United States
- Partner: Carmel Bodel
Medal record
Figure skating
Ice dancing
Representing the United States
World Championships
| Bronze medal – third place | 1954 Oslo | Ice dancing |
North American Championships
| Gold medal – first place | 1955 Regina | Ice dancing |
| Bronze medal – third place | 1953 Cleveland | Ice dancing |
| Gold medal – first place | 1951 Calgary | Ice dancing |

Edward Lee Bodel (May 21, 1921 – May 17, 2008) was an American figure skater, competing in ice dance with Carmel Waterbury Bodel. At the U.S. Figure Skating Championships, the Bodels won the bronze medal in 1946 and 1949, the year they married each other, and the gold medal three times, in 1951, 1954, and 1955. They came in first place at the North American Championships in 1951 and 1955 and won the bronze medal at the 1954 World Figure Skating Championships.

== Competitive Highlights ==
(with Carmel)

| Event | 1946 | 1949 | 1951 | 1952 | 1953 | 1954 | 1955 | 1956 | 1957 |
|---|---|---|---|---|---|---|---|---|---|
| World Championships | | | | 4th | 7th | 3rd | 4th | 6th | 7th |
| North American Championships | | | 1st | | 3rd | | 1st | | |
| U.S. Championships | 3rd | 3rd | 1st | 3rd | 3rd | 1st | 1st | 2nd | 4th |
