= Robert Uppgren =

American figure skater

Robert Arnold Uppgren
Personal information
- Born: December 14, 1923
- Died: May 12, 1967 (aged 43) Leech Lake, Minnesota

Figure skating career
- Country: United States
Medal record
Representing the United States
Fours' Figure skating
North American Championships
Gold medal – first place	1941 Philadelphia	Fours

Robert Arnold Uppgren (December 14, 1923 - May 12, 1967) was an American figure skater. He competed in pair skating with partner Janette Ahrens. He also competed in fours with Ahrens, Mary Louise Premer, and Lyman Wakefield, Jr. and won the 1941 North American title.

By 1967, Uppgren had begun working for the United States Fish and Wildlife Service in its Minneapolis offices. On May 12, he died in a helicopter crash in Leech Lake.

== Competitive highlights ==
(with Ahrens)

Event	1942	1943
U.S. Championships	2nd	2nd

=== Four skating ===
(with Premer, Uppgren, and Wakefield)

Event	1941
North American Championships	1st

=== Men's singles ===
Event	1940
U.S. Championships	5th J
