= Beatrix Loughran =

American figure skater (1900–1975)

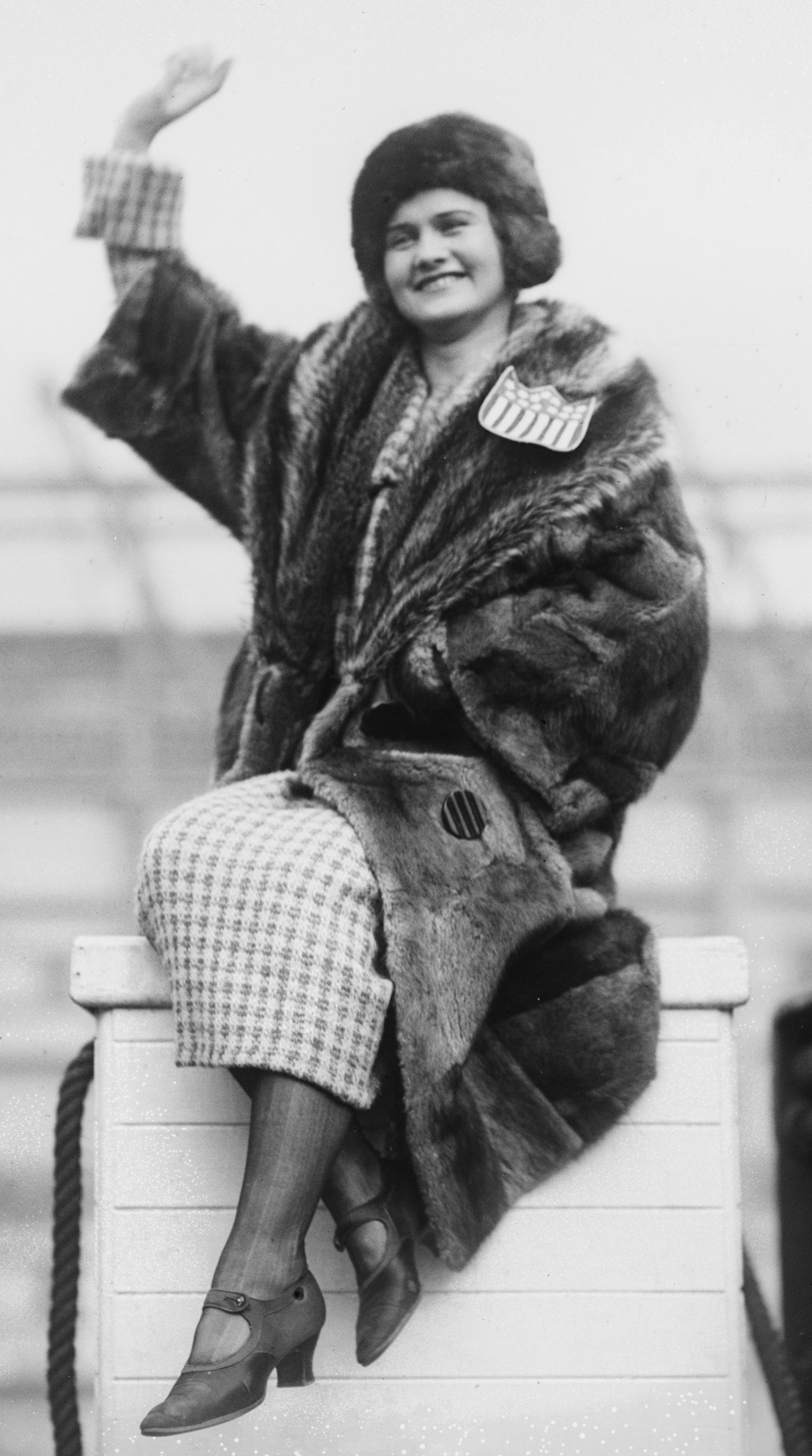

Personal information
- Born: June 30, 1900 Mount Vernon, New York, U.S.
- Died: December 7, 1975 (aged 75) Long Beach, New York, U.S.

Figure skating career
- Country: United States
- Partner: Sherwin Badger
- Skating club: Skating Club of New York
- Retired: 1932
Medal record
Figure skating
Representing United States
Olympic Games
Bronze medal – third place	1928 St. Moritz	Ladies' singles
Silver medal – second place	1924 Chamonix	Ladies' singles
World Championships
Bronze medal – third place	1924 Oslo	Ladies' singles
North American Championships
Gold medal – first place	1927 Toronto	Ladies' singles
Gold medal – first place	1925 Boston	Ladies' singles
Pairs Figure skating
Olympic Games
Silver medal – second place	1932 Lake Placid	Pairs
World Championships
Bronze medal – third place	1932 Montreal	Pairs
Bronze medal – third place	1930 New York	Pairs
North American Championships
Bronze medal – third place	1931 Ottawa	Pairs

Beatrix Suzetta Loughran (June 30, 1900 – December 7, 1975) was an American figure skater who competed in single and pair skating. She is the only American to win three Olympic medals in figure skating (1924, 1928, 1932), and one of the oldest figure skating Olympic medalists. She is a six-time national champion (1925–1927 in singles, 1930–1932 in pairs). Her pairs partner was Sherwin Badger.

Beatrix Loughran is the first and only figure skater in history to win three Olympic medals in two separate figure skating disciplines. She is one of only three athletes to win Olympic medals in two separate figure skating disciplines. She was the first North American skater to win a medal at a Worlds Championships, in 1924, when she came in third place.

Loughran was born in Mount Vernon, New York, and died in Long Beach, New York. She was the aunt of three-time national medalist Audrey Peppe.

In 1997, Loughran was inducted into the United States Figure Skating Hall of Fame.

== Results ==
=== Ladies' singles ===
Event	1920	1921	1922	1923	1924	1925	1926	1927	1928
Winter Olympics					2nd				3rd
World Championships					3rd				
North American Championships						1st		1st	
U.S. Championships	3rd J	1st J	2nd	2nd		1st	1st	1st	

=== Pairs ===
(with Badger)

Event	1928	1929	1930	1931	1932
Winter Olympic Games	4th				2nd
World Championships	5th		3rd		3rd
North American Championships				3rd	
U.S. Championships			1st	1st	1st
