= Hugh Graham (figure skater) =

American figure skater

Personal information
- Full name: Hugh C. Graham Jr.
- Born: November 23, 1933
- Died: May 30, 2024 (aged 90)
- Home town: Tulsa, Oklahoma, U.S.

Figure skating career
- Country: United States
- Discipline: Men's singles, Pairs
- Partner: Margaret Anne Graham
Medal record
North American Championships
Silver medal – second place	1953 Cleveland	Pairs

Hugh C. Graham Jr. (November 23, 1933 – May 30, 2024) was an American figure skater.

He competed as a singles skater and as a pair skater with his sister, Margaret Anne Graham. After his competitive career ended, he spent from 1986 to 1989 as the President of the United States Figure Skating Association. Graham was inducted into the United States Figure Skating Hall of Fame in 2004.

Graham graduated Harvard University in 1955, during which he was a member of the Skating Club of Boston, and then he graduated from the University of Chicago Pritzker School of Medicine in 1959. He practiced as a pediatrician in Tulsa, Oklahoma for several decades before retiring.

== Results ==
=== Men's singles ===
Event	1955
World Championships	10th
U.S. Championships	3rd

=== Pairs ===
(with Margaret Anne Graham)

Event	1953	1954
World Championships		5th
North American Championships	3rd	
U.S. Championships	2nd	2nd
