= Michael McGean =

American ice dancer

Michael McGean was an American ice dancer who competed with Lois Waring. Together, they were the national champions in 1950 and 1952.

== Results ==
Pairs (with Ann McGean)

Event	1945
U.S. Championships	2nd

Ice Dance (with Waring)

Event	1950	1951	1952
U.S. Championships	1st		1st

Men's singles

Event	1944	1945
U.S. Championships	2nd J	2nd J
