= Guy Revell =

Canadian figure skater

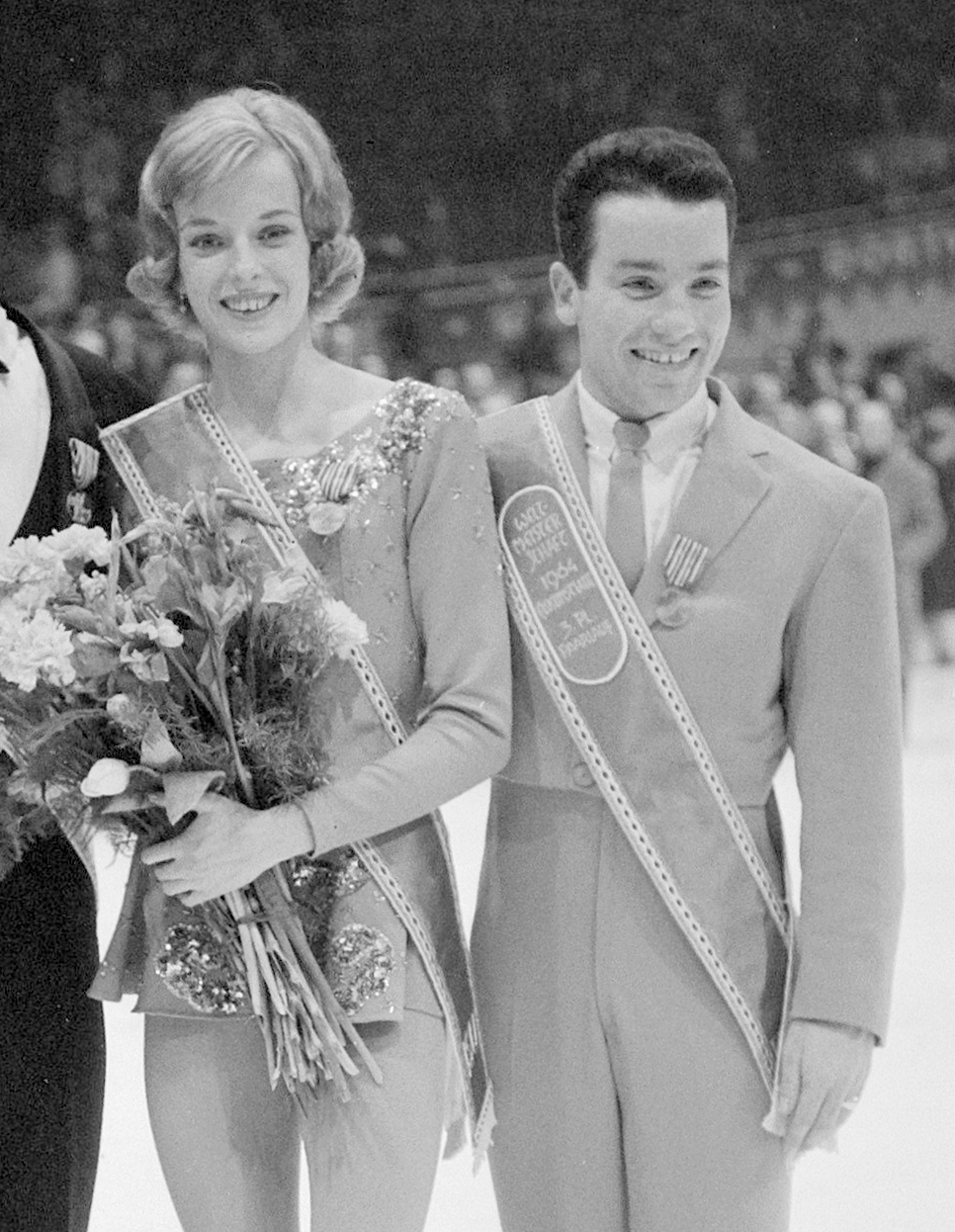
- Wilkes and Revell at the 1964 World Championships

Personal information
- Born: August 2, 1941 Toronto, Ontario, Canada
- Died: March 11, 1981 (aged 39) Coquitlam, British Columbia, Canada
- Height: 1.63 m (5 ft 4 in)

Figure skating career
- Country: Canada
- Skating club: Unionville Skating Club
- Retired: 1964
Medal record
Representing Canada
Figure skating: Pairs
Olympic Games
Silver medal – second place	1964 Innsbruck	Pairs
World Championships
Bronze medal – third place	1964 Dortmund	Pairs
North American Championships
Gold medal – first place	1963 Vancouver	Pairs
Bronze medal – third place	1961 Philadelphia	Pairs

Guy Revell (August 2, 1941 - March 11, 1981) was a Canadian pair skater. With skating partner Debbi Wilkes, he became a two-time Canadian national champion, the 1963 North American champion, and the 1964 Olympic silver medallist.

== Career ==
Revell began skating with Debbi Wilkes, six years his junior, in 1958 after meeting at the Unionville skating carnival. Though their height difference was adequate at the start of their partnership, by the time Wilkes was seventeen in 1963, her height was 5 feet 5 inches (165 cm) to Revell's 5 feet 4 inches (163 cm). They were coached by Bruce Hyland at Crosby Arena and represented the Unionville Skating Club throughout their career.

Wilkes fell from a lift while posing for press photographs prior to the 1963 World Championships, hitting the ice head-first and fracturing her skull. The pair had to withdraw from the competition.

Wilkes/Revell were awarded the bronze medal at the 1964 Winter Olympics in Innsbruck, while gold went to Ludmila Belousova / Oleg Protopopov and silver to Marika Kilius / Hans-Jürgen Bäumler. After taking the bronze at the 1964 World Championships in Dortmund, the pair parted ways — Wilkes decided to pursue an education while Revell elected to tour professionally in ice shows.

In 1966, Wilkes/Revell were informed that the silver medallists in Innsbruck, Marika Kilius / Hans-Jürgen Bäumler of Germany, had been disqualified after an International Olympic Committee investigation found they had signed pro contracts before the Olympics. IOC executive James Worrall presented Wilkes/Revell with the silver medals during the Canadian Championships in Peterborough, Ont. Later, Kilius/Baumler were reinstated in the record books, but the medals were never redistributed. In December 2013, after an investigation by The New York Times, the International Olympic Committee confirmed that Kilius/Bäumler and Wilkes/Revell share the 1964 Olympic silver medal and Joseph/Joseph of the United States are the bronze medallists. Despite the information on its website over the years, the IOC stated that this was intended to be the official result since 1987.

Revell joined the Ice Capades and had a long career skating professionally with Gertrude Desjardins. Having relatively little formal education, he had difficulty adjusting to life after the end of his performing career and committed suicide in 1981.

== Results ==
(with Wilkes)

International
Event	1959	1960	1961	1962	1963	1964
Winter Olympics						2nd
World Championships		11th		4th	WD	3rd
North American Champ.	5th		3rd		1st	
National
Canadian Championships	1st J	3rd	3rd	3rd	1st	1st
J = Junior level; WD = Withdrew
