= Donald Knight (figure skater) =

Personal information
- Full name: Donald Knight
- Born: June 8, 1947 (age 79)
- Home town: Dundas, Ontario

Figure skating career
- Country: Canada
Medal record
Representing Canada
Men's Figure skating
World Championships
Bronze medal – third place	1965 Colorado Springs	Men's singles
North American Championships
Gold medal – first place	1967 Montreal	Men's singles
Bronze medal – third place	1965 Rochester	Men's singles

Donald Knight (born June 8, 1947) is the 1965-1967 Canadian national champion in men's singles. He won the North American Figure Skating Championships in 1967, having placed third in the previous competition, in 1965. Knight also won the bronze medal at the World Figure Skating Championships in 1965. He trained with coach Ellen Burka.

After retiring from competitive skating, Knight toured for eleven years as a principal performer with Ice Capades and Holiday on Ice in Europe. He currently works as a skating coach consultant with the Burlington Skate Centre and Oakville Skating Club in Halton Region of Ontario, Canada.

== Results ==
International
Event	1961	1962	1963	1964	1965	1966	1967
Winter Olympics				9th			
World Champ.			8th	9th	3rd	7th	4th
North American Champ.					3rd		1st
National
Canadian Champ.	1st J	3rd	2nd	2nd	1st	1st	1st
J = Junior level
