= Charles Snelling (figure skater) =

Canadian figure skater

Personal information
- Full name: Charles Frederick Theodore Snelling
- Born: September 17, 1937 (age 88) Toronto, Ontario, Canada
- Height: 168 cm (5.51 ft)

Figure skating career
- Country: Canada
- Skating club: Granite Club
Medal record
Representing Canada
Men's Figure skating
World Championships
| Bronze medal – third place | 1957 Colorado Springs | Men's singles |
North American Championships
| Silver medal – second place | 1957 Rochester | Men's singles |
| Bronze medal – third place | 1955 Regina | Men's singles |

Charles Frederick Theodore Snelling (born September 17, 1937 in Toronto) is a Canadian former figure skater. He is the 1954-1958 & 1964 Canadian national champion and the 1957 World bronze medalist. He is the youngest ever men's Canadian national champion, as he was 16 at the time of his win in March 1954. He graduated from the University of Toronto Schools.

Snelling placed 8th at the 1956 Winter Olympics. In 1958, he retired from skating to attend medical school at the University of Toronto, but after graduation he returned to competitive skating and competed at the 1964 Winter Olympics. In 2005, he was inducted into the Skate Canada Hall of Fame. He lives in Vancouver, B.C. He is a retired burns and plastics specialist.

== Results ==
International
| Event | 1951 | 1952 | 1953 | 1954 | 1955 | 1956 | 1957 | 1958 | 1964 | 1965 | 1966 | 1967 |
|---|---|---|---|---|---|---|---|---|---|---|---|---|
| Olympics | | | | | | 8th | | | 13th | | | |
| Worlds | | | | 7th | 8th | 4th | 3rd | 11th | 12th | | 11th | |
| North American | | | | | 3rd | | 2nd | | | | | |
National
| Canadian | 2nd J | 1st J | 2nd | 1st | 1st | 1st | 1st | 1st | 1st | 2nd | 2nd | 3rd |
