= Nancy Ludington =

American pair skater

Personal information
- Full name: Nancy Irene Rouillard
- Other names: Nancy Irene Ludington
- Born: July 25, 1939 (age 86) Stoneham, Massachusetts

Figure skating career
- Country: United States
- Skating club: Commonwealth Figure Skating Club
- Retired: 1960
Medal record
Pairs' figure skating
Representing the United States
Olympic Games
Bronze medal – third place	1960 Squaw Valley	Pairs
World Championships
Bronze medal – third place	1959 Colorado Springs	Pairs
North American Championships
Bronze medal – third place	1957 Rochester	Pairs

Nancy Irene Rouillard (married names: Ludington, Graham, born July 25, 1939) is an American former pair skater.

== Personal life ==
Rouillard was born in Stoneham, Massachusetts. She has been married twice, once to pairs partner Ronald Ludington in 1957 and the second time to Frank Graham. She lives in Maine and featured on "Bill Green's Maine" on February 15, 2014.

== Career ==
She began competing with Ronald Ludington in 1956 and she won her first national title under her maiden name. She changed her name professionally after she married Ludington in 1957. The Ludingtons went on to win the bronze medal at the 1960 Winter Olympics. They also won the U.S. national title between 1957 and 1960, after having been the junior national champions in 1956. They are also the 1959 World bronze medalists.

== Results ==
(pairs with Ronald Ludington)

Event	1957	1958	1959	1960
Winter Olympic Games				3rd
World Championships	4th	5th	3rd	6th
North American Championships	3rd			
U.S. Championships	1st	1st	1st	1st
