= Shirra Kenworthy =

Canadian figure skater

Personal information
- Born: 19 April 1943 (age 83)

Figure skating career
- Country: Canada
Medal record
Representing Canada
Ladies' Figure skating
North American Championships
Bronze medal – third place	1963 Vancouver	Ladies' singles

Shirra Kenworthy (born April 19, 1943) is a Canadian former figure skater who competed in ladies' singles. She won the silver medal at the Canadian Figure Skating Championships in 1960 and 1961 and captured the bronze the next three years. She also competed at the World Figure Skating Championships several times, with a best finish of 10th in 1964, and participated in the 1964 Winter Olympic Games, finishing 12th.

== Results ==
Event	1958	1959	1960	1961	1962	1963	1964
Winter Olympics							12th
World Championships			15th			20th	10th
North American Championships						3rd	
Canadian Championships	4th J	3rd J	2nd	2nd	3rd	3rd	3rd
