= Cynthia Kauffman =

American pair skater

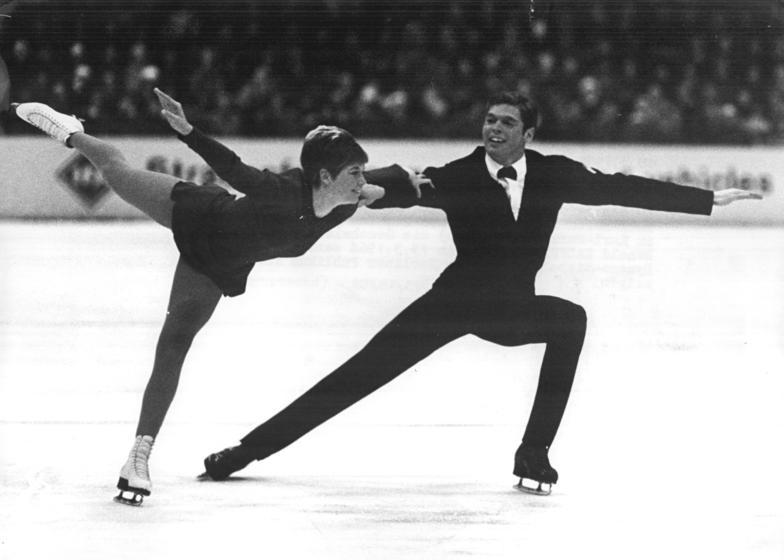

Personal information
- Full name: Cynthia Diane Kauffman
- Born: August 23, 1948 (age 77) Seattle, Washington, U.S.
- Height: 5 ft 3 in (1.60 m)

Figure skating career
- Country: United States
- Partner: Ronald Kauffman
- Skating club: Seattle SC
Medal record
Pairs' Figure skating
Representing United States
World Championships
Bronze medal – third place	1968 Geneva	Pairs
Bronze medal – third place	1967 Vienna	Pairs
Bronze medal – third place	1966 Davos	Pairs
North American Championships
Gold medal – first place	1969 Oakland	Pairs
Gold medal – first place	1967 Montreal	Pairs
Silver medal – second place	1965 Rochester	Pairs

Cynthia Diane Kauffman (married name: Marshall; born August 23, 1948, in Seattle, Washington) is an American pair skater. With brother Ronald Kauffman, she is a four-time (1966–1969) U.S. national champion and a three-time (1966–1968) World bronze medalist. They represented the United States at the 1964 Winter Olympics and the 1968 Winter Olympics, placing 8th in 1964 and 6th in 1968.

They were inducted into the U.S. Figure Skating Hall of Fame in 1995.

== Competitive highlights ==
(with Kauffman)

International
Event	1961	1962	1963	1964	1965	1966	1967	1968	1969
Olympics				8th				6th	
Worlds				7th	6th	3rd	3rd	3rd	4th
North American					2nd		1st		1st
National
U.S. Champ.	4th J	2nd J		3rd	2nd	1st	1st	1st	1st
J = Junior level
