= Sherwin Badger =

American figure skater (1901–1972)

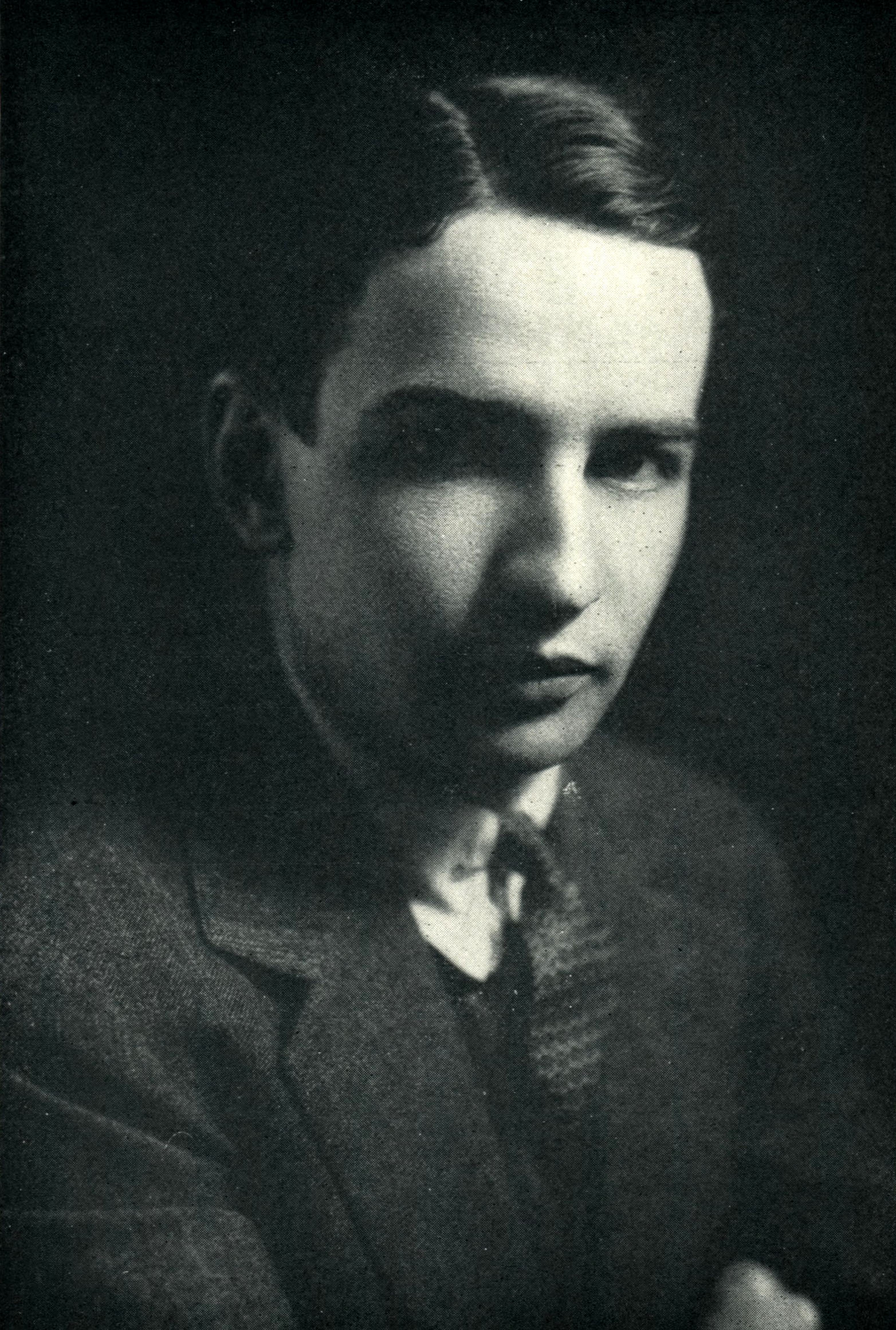
- Badger around 1930

Personal information
- Born: August 29, 1901 Boston, Massachusetts, U.S.
- Died: April 8, 1972 (aged 70) Sherborn, Massachusetts, U.S.

Figure skating career
- Country: United States
- Discipline: Men's singles, Pairs
- Partner: Beatrix Loughran
- Retired: 1932
Medal record
Representing United States
Men's figure skating
North American Championships
Silver medal – second place	1927 Toronto	Men's singles
Gold medal – first place	1923 Ottawa	Men's singles
Pairs figure skating
Olympic Games
Silver medal – second place	1932 Lake Placid	Pairs
World Championships
Bronze medal – third place	1932 Montreal	Pairs
Bronze medal – third place	1930 New York	Pairs
North American Championships
Bronze medal – third place	1931 Ottawa	Pairs

Sherwin Campbell Badger (August 29, 1901 – April 8, 1972) was an American figure skater who competed in singles and pairs.

Badger was born on August 29, 1901, in Boston, Massachusetts.

In 1918, he was the junior champion and won the silver medal in pair skating, with Clara Frothingham, at the U.S. Figure Skating Championships. He came in second place in pair skating in 1922, with Edith Ratch.

He earned the men's titles at the U.S. Nationals from 1920 through 1924. He also captured the pairs gold medal with partner Beatrix Loughran between 1931 and 1933, and the pair came in fifth place at the 1928 Winter Olympics and won the silver medal at the 1932 Winter Olympics. They also competed at the Worlds Championships three times, coming in fifth place in 1928 and in third place in 1930 and 1932.

Badger was president of the United States Figure Skating Association in 1930 and 1934. As of 2011, he was the only president of the federation who was a national champion at the same time. He was also a world judge.

Badger was briefly married to novelist and World War II spy Mary Bancroft. He graduated from Harvard University in 1923.

Badger died on April 8, 1972, in Sherborn, Massachusetts.

== Results ==
=== Men's singles ===
Event	1918	1920	1921	1922	1923	1924	1925	1926	1927	1928
Winter Olympic Games										11th
North American Championships					1st				2nd	
U.S. Championships	1st J	1st	1st	1st	1st	1st				

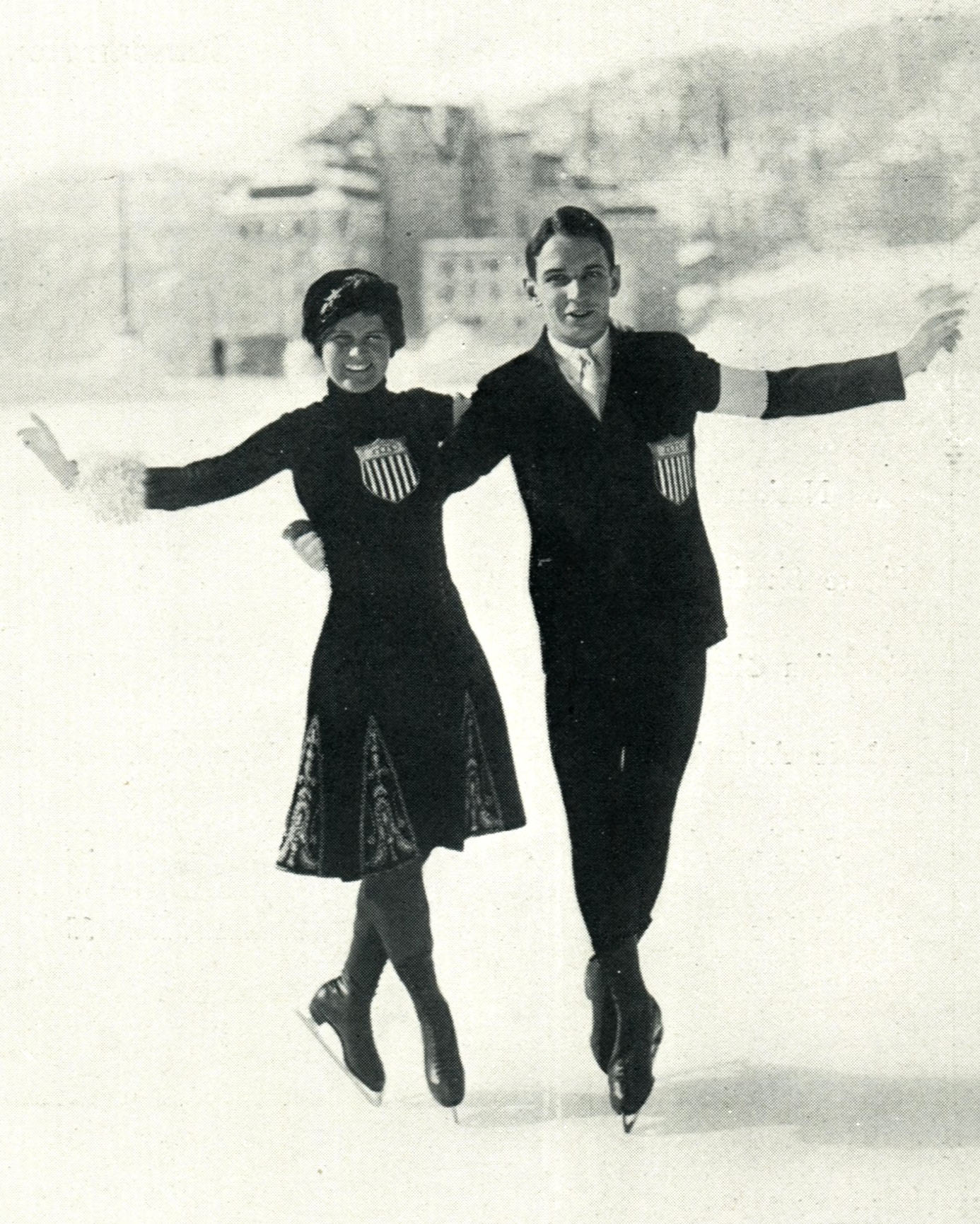
Badger with Loughran

=== Pairs ===
with Frothingham

Event	1918
U.S. Championships	2nd

with Rotch

Event	1920
U.S. Championships	2nd

with Loughran

Event	1928	1929	1930	1931	1932
Winter Olympic Games	4th				2nd
World Championships	5th		3rd		3rd
North American Championships				3rd	
U.S. Championships			1st	1st	1st
