= John Nightingale (figure skater) =

American figure skater

Personal information
- Full name: John Sheridan Nightingale
- Born: December 2, 1928 (age 97) Saint Paul, Minnesota, United States

Figure skating career
- Country: United States
Medal record
Representing United States
Pairs' Figure skating
North American Championships
Silver medal – second place	1951 Calgary	Pairs
Fours' Figure skating
North American Championships
Gold medal – first place	1949 Philadelphia	Fours

John Nightingale (born December 2, 1928) is an American former figure skater. He was born in Saint Paul, Minnesota. He competed in pairs with partner Janet Gerhauser, twice winning the silver medal at the United States Figure Skating Championships and taking part in the 1952 Winter Olympic Games. He also competed in fours with Gerhauser, Marilyn Thomsen, and Marlyn Thomsen and won the 1949 North American title.

== Competitive highlights ==
=== Results ===
(with Gerhauser)

Event	1951	1952
Winter Olympics		6th
World Championships	8th	5th
North American Championships	2nd	
U.S. Championships	2nd	2nd

=== Fours ===
(with Gerhauser, Thomsen, and Thomsen)

Event	1949
North American Championships	1st
