= F. Ritter Shumway =

Hall-of-fame figure skater

Frank Ritter Shumway (27 March 1906 – 9 March 1992) was a major figure in figure skating in the United States.

From 1951 to 1965, he was president of the Ritter Company, a dental chair manufacturer founded by his grandfather Frank Ritter, and later led the company's successor, the Sybron Corporation. The Ritter line was later bought from Sybron by Midmark.

In 1955, Shumway founded the Genesee Figure Skating Club after becoming active (and setting records) in the over-35 category of figure skating competition. Needing a place to train, he donated money to the Rochester Institute of Technology to add an ice rink to its downtown Rochester campus. The ice rink was later named for Shumway. When RIT was forced to move in the mid-1960s, he ensured that the new Henrietta campus would also have an ice arena. The new rink, the Frank Ritter Memorial Ice Arena, was named for Shumway's grandfather, a founder of one of RIT's forerunners, the Mechanics Institute. The Genesee Figure Skating Club also moved to the new arena when it was built in 1968. The Shumway arena was also home to the Rochester Ice Cats, a special needs hockey team. The Ice Cats had home games and practices at the arena, but were later relocated to Bill Gray's Regional Iceplex.

Shumway became president of the United States Figure Skating Association in 1961, shortly before the entire U.S. figure skating team, with coaches and family, died in the crash of Sabena Flight 548 (15 February 1961). Shumway subsequently created the USFSA Memorial Fund. Shumway said in September of that year: "We will take our Memorial Fund a giant skating stroke forward toward our goal of perpetuating the memory of our gallant 1961 World Team skaters, not so much by statuary and plaques, as by giving us the means to assist talented young skaters — many of them yet 'undiscovered' — to get started, to develop and advance, and eventually to represent our country in future years, and to be ranked at the top of the world in the art of figure skating."

Shumway and his wife Hettie (née Lakin) were donors to RIT. Hettie Shumway is the namesake of one of RIT's dining halls.

Shumway was inducted into the U.S. and World Figure Skating Hall of Fames in 1986. He continued ice skating until just months before his death in 1992.
