= Claire Waters Ferguson =

American figure skating judge (1935–2024)

Claire Waters Ferguson (September 24, 1935 – January 12, 2024) was an American figure skating official and judge who was the president of the United States Figure Skating Association from 1992 to 1995.

== Life and career ==
Claire Waters Ferguson was born on September 24, 1935. She began skating at a young age and became a judge at age 16, working her way up to the national level and then to the Olympic level. She attended Michigan State University where she was a member of Alpha Phi and graduated with a degree in communication skills and English in 1957.

In 1992, Ferguson became the first woman in the 75-year history of the United States Figure Skating Association to be named its president (1992–1995). Ferguson was president during the 1994 Winter Olympics and the Nancy Kerrigan/Tonya Harding incident. Ferguson was also the first woman elected to the International Federation for Figure Skaters. She served on the International Skating Union Council, the first U.S. woman to do so. She was on the board of directors of the Rhode Island Sports Council and a member of the Jamestown, Rhode Island Town Council.

Ferguson died on January 12, 2024, at the age of 88.

== See also ==
- Tonya Harding and the attack on Kerrigan
