= Albertina Noyes =

American figure skater

Personal information
- Full name: Albertina Natalie Noyes
- Other names: Tina Noyes
- Born: January 7, 1949 (age 77) Cambridge, Massachusetts

Figure skating career
- Country: United States
- Coach: Cecilia Colledge
- Skating club: Skating Club of Boston
Medal record
Representing the United States
Figure skating: Ladies' singles
North American Championships
Bronze medal – third place	1967 Montreal	Ladies' singles

Albertina Natalie "Tina" Noyes (born January 7, 1949) is an American former figure skater. She is a four-time U.S. national silver medalist and the 1967 North American bronze medalist. She represented the United States at the 1964 Winter Olympics, where she placed 8th, and at the 1968 Winter Olympics, where she placed 4th. She was coached by Cecilia Colledge.

Noyes coaches at the Hayden Recreation Centre in Lexington, Massachusetts. In 2017, she received the Dorothy Franey Langkop Ambassador Award from the U.S. Olympians and Paralympians Association. In 2025, she was inducted into the U.S. Figure Skating Hall of Fame.

She is married to Larry Zimmerman.

== Results ==
International
Event	1961	1962	1963	1964	1965	1966	1967	1968	1969
Winter Olympics				8th				4th	
World Champ.				9th	10th	9th	7th	6th	
North American Champ.							3rd		
National
U.S. Champ.	1st N	3rd J	1st J	2nd	3rd	2nd	2nd	2nd	3rd
Levels: N = Novice; Junior
