= Ardelle Kloss =

American figure skater

Ardelle Kloss Sanderson (April 12, 1916 – September 15, 2011, in Lake Placid, New York) was an American figure skater who competed in pair skating and ice dancing. She trained in Lake Placid under coach Willi Boeckl and competed with partner Roland Janson. She and Janson won the bronze medal in ice dance at the 1937 United States Figure Skating Championships and captured the bronze in pairs the following year.

After her competitive career, Sanderson was a longtime figure skating official and was a judge at the 1964 Winter Olympic Games. She was inducted into the United States Figure Skating Hall of Fame in 1991 and died in 2011 at age 95.
