= Janet Gerhauser =

American figure skater

Personal information
- Full name: Janet Jean Gerhauser Carpenter
- Born: August 9, 1932 (age 93) Minneapolis, Minnesota, United States

Figure skating career
- Country: United States
Medal record
Representing the United States
Pairs' Figure skating
North American Championships
| Silver medal – second place | 1951 Calgary | Pairs |
Fours' Figure skating
North American Championships
| Gold medal – first place | 1949 Philadelphia | Fours |

Janet Jean Gerhauser Carpenter (born August 9, 1932, in Minneapolis, Minnesota) is an American former pair skater who competed with John Nightingale, twice winning the silver medal at the United States Figure Skating Championships and taking part in the 1952 Winter Olympic Games. She also competed in fours with Nightingale, Marilyn Thomsen, and Marlyn Thomsen and won the 1949 North American title. After her competitive career ended, she was a judge and a coach. She was inducted into the U.S. Figure Skating Hall of Fame in 2008.

== Results ==
=== Pairs ===
(with Nightingale)

| Event | 1951 | 1952 |
|---|---|---|
| Winter Olympics | | 6th |
| World Championships | 8th | 5th |
| North American Championships | 2nd | |
| U.S. Championships | 2nd | 2nd |

=== Fours ===
(with Nightingale, Thomsen, and Thomsen)

| Event | 1949 |
|---|---|
| North American Championships | 1st |

=== Ladies' singles ===
| Event | 1949 | 1950 | 1951 | 1952 |
|---|---|---|---|---|
| U.S. Championships | 6th J | 4th J | 3rd J | 4th J |
