= Mary Louise Wright =

Mary Louise Lyle Wright, née Premer (born 1 February 1923 in Saint Paul, Minnesota; died December 15, 2004) was an American figure skater and official.

Wright was the 1941 North American champion in four skating. After retiring from competition, she served as a figure skating judge for many years. She was the daughter of Frederic and Marie Premer and was married to Benjamin T. Wright, a former U.S. Figure Skating president. She died in December 2004 due to cancer.
