= U.S. Figure Skating =

National governing body for figure skating

- Sport: Figure skating
- Jurisdiction: United States
- Founded: 1921
- Affiliation: International Skating Union
- Affiliation date: 1921
- Headquarters: 20 First Street
- Location: Colorado Springs, Colorado, U.S.
- President: Samuel Auxier

Official website
- usfigureskating.org
- (United States)

U.S. Figure Skating is the national governing body for the sport of figure skating in the United States. It is recognized as such by the United States Olympic & Paralympic Committee (USOPC) under the Ted Stevens Olympic and Amateur Sports Act and is the United States member of the International Skating Union (ISU). Although the official name of the organization is "the United States Figure Skating Association," it is now known as and conducts business under the name "U.S. Figure Skating." Founded in 1921, U.S. Figure Skating regulates and governs the sport and defines and maintains the standard of skating proficiency. It specifies the rules for testing, competitions, and all other figure skating related activities. U.S. Figure Skating promotes interest and participation in the sport by assisting member clubs, skaters, and athletes, appointing officials, organizing competitions, exhibitions, and other figure skating pursuits, and offering a wide variety of programs.

Athletes and officials who represent the United States at international figure skating competitions are selected by U.S. Figure Skating.

The Association is a non-profit organization.

== History ==
USFSA logo (1964–2003)

In 1922 the United States Figure Skating Association was formed and became a member of the International Skating Union. At the time of its formation, the Association was composed of seven charter member clubs including Beaver Dam Winter Sports Club, The Skating Club of Boston, Chicago Figure Skating Club The Skating Club of New York, Philadelphia Skating Club and Humane Society, Sno Birds of Lake Placid, and Twin City Figure Skating Club (which became the Figure Skating Club of Minneapolis in 1929).

Since its inception through 1947, the governance activities of the Association were centered in New York City. The annual Governing Council meetings, as well as the annual Executive Committee meetings, were all held in New York City. In 1949 the Association transferred its offices to Chicago, Illinois. The offices were again moved, this time to Boston, in 1950. In 1979, the Association moved into its current headquarters in Colorado Springs, Colorado. This followed the USOC's move to Colorado Springs a year earlier in July 1978.

In the 1930s, the Association made an effort to increase the number of competitive events by creating the three sectional championships, Eastern (1938), Midwestern (1933), and Pacific Coast (1936).

In 1959, the Eastern and Pacific Coast Sections expanded their qualifying competitions by adding three Sub-Sectionals Championships each. The Eastern Section created the New England, North Atlantic, and South Atlantic Regions, while the Pacific Coast Section established the Central Pacific, Northwest, and Southwest Pacific Regions. It wasn't until 1962 that the Midwestern Sectional finally added their regional championships to the qualifying competition cycle.

The abbreviated name, "USFSA" was first used in April 1921 and trademarked in 1972. The distinctive shield logo was adopted in 1964 and used until 2003 when U.S. Figure Skating instituted its current logo.

In 2006, the Executive Committee was eliminated. At the same time the Board of Directors was reduced to sixteen members from its previous 29 members.

As of May 5, 2007, the Association officially adopted the name "U.S. Figure Skating" and dropped the abbreviated name of "USFSA".

== Governance ==
U.S. Figure Skating is an association of clubs, governed by its members and its elected officers at national, regional and club levels. As of June 2011, U.S. Figure Skating had 688 member, collegiate, and school-affiliated clubs and a membership of 180,452. Each member club may send delegates to the annual Governing Council meeting.

=== Governing Council ===
U.S. Figure Skating has a representational government. Clubs and individual members appoint delegates. The number of delegates representing a club and the individual members depends on the prior year's paid registered member. Athlete delegate representation is required to be 20 percent of the prior year's registered delegate and proxy votes. Collectively these delegates meet annually (typically early May) to review, amend and ratify the actions taken by the Board since the prior year's Governing Council. This annual meeting of the appointed delegates is called the Governing Council.

=== Board of directors ===
The Board of Directors is charged with the management of the business and affairs of U.S. Figure Skating. It is currently composed of sixteen members including: the president, three vice presidents (one from each section), the secretary, the treasurer, four group coordinators, two coaches, and four athletes.

==== Presidents ====
Samuel Auxier is the current president of U.S. Figure Skating. He began his term in 2022. The prior presidents are listed below.

==== Past presidents ====
Name	Term
Anne Cammett	2018–2022
Samuel Auxier	2014–2018
Patricia St. Peter	2009–2014
Ron Hershberger	2005–2009
Chuck Foster	2003–2005
Phyllis Howard	2000–2003
James W. Disbrow	1998–2000
Morry Stillwell	1995–1998
Claire W. Ferguson	1992–1995
Dr. Franklin S. Nelson	1989–1992
Dr. Hugh C. Graham Jr.	1986–1989
George T. Yonekura	1983–1986
Oscar T. Iobst Jr.	1980–1983
Charles A. DeMore	1976–1980
Benjamin T. Wright	1973–1976
Frederick C. LeFevre	1970–1973
Spencer E. Cram	1967–1970
John R. Shoemaker	1964–1967
F. Ritter Shumway	1961–1964
Howard D. Herbert	1958–1961
Kenneth L. Brown	1955–1958
H. Kendall Kelley	1952–1955
Harry N. Keighley	1949–1952
Henry M. Beatty	1946–1949
Walter S. Powell	1943–1946
Heaton R. Robertson	1940–1943
Joseph K. Savage	1937–1940
Charles M. Rotch	1935–1937
Sherwin C. Badger	1934–1935
Charles M. Rotch	1932–1934
Sherwin C. Badger	1930–1932
Charles T. Church	1928–1930
Henry W. Howe	1925–1928
A. Winsor Weld	1921–1925

=== Committees ===
Committees, in particular the Permanent Committees, are responsible for proposing and enforcing the rules of the U.S. Figure Skating. Other special committees may undertake other projects, such as nominations and other ad hoc matters.

==== Permanent committees ====
The following table shows the Association's permanent committees:

Adult Skating	Athlete Development	Athletes Advisory	Audit
Coaches	Collegiate Program	Compensation	Competitions
Dance	Ethics	Finance	Grievance
International	International Judges & Officials	Judges	Membership
Memorial Fund	Pairs	Parents	Program Development
Rules	Sanctions and Eligibility	Selections	Singles
Special Olympics/Therapeutic	Sports Sciences and Medicine	State Games	Strategic Planning
Synchronized Skating	Technical Panel	Tests	Theatrical Skating

== Mission statement ==
“As the national governing body, the mission of the United States Figure Skating Association is to provide programs to encourage participation and achievement in the sport of figure skating on ice.”

== Operations ==
=== Executive Director ===
The Executive Director is responsible for the day-to-day operations of U.S. Figure Skating. Mr. David Raith is currently serving in that capacity and has done so since 2005. He is charged with carrying out the policies, programs, and goals of the association as approved by the Board of Directors.

=== Departments ===
The departments that support U.S. Figure Skating's operations reside at its headquarters in Colorado Springs, CO. These departments are staffed by full-time employees. They administer and manage the association's day-to-day affairs.

Athlete Development	Athlete High Performance	Events	Finance
Information Technology	Marketing and Communications	Membership	Executive Director

=== Finance ===
The Association is a non-profit organization. As of June 30, 2011, U.S. Figure Skating had revenue, support, and gains of approximately $24.9 million derived primarily from dues, admissions and activity fees, skating events, sponsorships, broadcast and licensing, publications, grants, and other sources. The association expended approximately $12.9 million on its various programs and services plus an additional $2.4 million on management and general administrative expenses, under which the departments listed under the “Operations – Departments” are included.

== Officials ==
Member clubs arrange to hold test sessions and competitions. The competitions are conducted under the supervision and authority of U.S. Figure Skating appointed officials. The member club (for competitions, the club is sometimes called the local organizing committee or “LOC”) is responsible for many of the ancillary functions of the test session or competition (registration, transportation, event monitoring, hospitality, messengers, copying, etc.). For national and international events, U.S. Figure Skating headquarters staff also provides logistics and event support. The officials are responsible for actually running the test sessions, competitions, and associated individual events. All the officials at test sessions and competitions are unpaid volunteers.

Officials receive their appointments from U.S. Figure Skating after demonstrating a certain level of proficiency, and in some cases, after trialing or taking written examinations. In most cases, officials are appointed at three levels; regional, sectional, and national.

Below is a list of officials at a typical large competition. For the 2012 U.S. Figure Skating Championships, 70 officials were assigned along with over 50 alternate officials. The parenthetical number is how many people were assigned to the respective positions. If there is no number, only one person was assigned.

Chief Referee	Assistant Referees (3)		
Dance Referee	Assistant Dance Referees		
Chief Accountant	Assistant Accountants (3)		
Chief Technical Accountant	Assistant Technical Accountants (2)		
Chief Ice Technician	Assistant Ice Technicians (3)		
Chief Music Coordinator	Assistant Music Coordinators (4)	Music Technician	
Chief Announcer	Assistant Announcers (3)		
Technical Controllers (6)	Technical Specialists (8)	Data Operators	Video Replay Operators
Judges - Singles/Pairs (18)	Judges - Dance (9)		

== Organization ==
U.S. Figure Skating's members, clubs, and qualifying competitions are divided into three geographical sections, that are further divided into nine regions.

- Eastern Section
  - New England: Connecticut, Maine, Massachusetts, New Hampshire, Rhode Island, Vermont
  - North Atlantic: New Jersey; New York; Erie, Pennsylvania
  - South Atlantic: Delaware; District of Columbia; Florida; Georgia; Maryland; North Carolina; Pennsylvania (excluding Erie); South Carolina; Virginia; West Virginia; Chattanooga, Tennessee
- Midwestern Section
  - Eastern Great Lakes: Alabama, Indiana, Kentucky, Michigan (Lower Peninsula), Mississippi, Ohio, Tennessee (excluding Chattanooga)
  - Southwestern: Arkansas, Colorado, Kansas (including Kansas City and St. Joseph, Missouri), Louisiana, Nebraska, New Mexico, Oklahoma, Texas, Kansas City
  - Upper Great Lakes: Illinois, Iowa, Michigan (Upper Peninsula), Minnesota, Missouri (excluding Kansas City and St. Joseph), North Dakota, South Dakota, Wisconsin
- Pacific Coast Section
  - Central Pacific: Northern California, Hawaii, Nevada, Utah
  - Northwest Pacific: Alaska, Idaho, Montana, Oregon, Washington, Wyoming
  - Southwest Pacific: Arizona, Southern California

== Types of membership ==
U.S. Figure Skating has nine types of membership:

- Clubs that foster figure skating, known as “member clubs”;
- Individual persons registered with U.S. Figure Skating who are members of a member club or a collegiate club;
- Individual persons who are not home club members of any member club, known as “individual members”;
- Honorary members;
- Collegiate club and school-affiliated members;
- Basic Skills members;
- Supportive members;
- Theatre On Ice/Team, and
- Introductory Members

== U.S. Figure Skating programs ==
U.S. Figure Skating offers many programs to accommodate a wide range of skill and interest levels.

- Adult skating
- Aspire Program
- Axel Club
- Basic Skills
- Collegiate
- Excel
- Showcase
- National Skating Month
- High School Programs
- Icemen
- Solo Dance
- Special Olympics / Therapeutic Skating
- Synchronized skating
- Test Track
- Theatre on Ice
- 6.0

== Testing ==
Testing allows figure skaters to demonstrate that they have achieved a certain level of skating proficiency. Tests progress in increasing difficulty and focus on power, strength, speed, quickness, flow, extension, and edge quality and control. Tests are conducted under the auspices of member clubs and administered during test sessions. Usually, three test judges (the judge panel), of appropriate level, determine the outcome of the tests on a pass / retry basis. Tests up to a certain level may be judged by a single, sufficiently qualified, judge. Some higher-level dance tests require judges certified in dance judging to attend. The member club is responsible for reporting the results to U.S. Figure Skating. U.S. Figure appoints test judges at various levels (bronze, silver, and gold) based on trial judging and their judging experience. According to their level, test judges are qualified to determine the outcome of increasingly difficult tests. Test judges are invited by the member club to participate in a given test session. Skaters’ testing levels passed determines at what level they may compete. For qualifying competitions, skaters must pass the free skate test at the level for which they intend to compete. U.S. Figure Skating still offers tests in compulsory figures, however, this discipline was last competed at a national championship competition in 1999.

Singles and adult skaters must show they are proficient at a given level by passing two tests at each level, moves in the field ("MIF") and free skate ("FS"). Additional test are conducted in the pairs skating, free dance and pattern dance discipline. Each member of a synchronized skating team must pass the appropriate test of single's competitor.

Tests must be completed in the order of increasing difficulty. They may not be taken out of turn. However, a singles skater may take as many moves-in-the-field tests before taking any free skate tests. Once a free skate test is passed, a competitor may only compete at that level at qualifying competitions. There are four test levels specific to adult figure skating. Adult skater must be twenty-one years of age or older.

=== Standard track levels ===
Moves in the field	Free skate	Pairs	MIF, FS, Pairs panel^{1}	Free dance	Free dance panel^{2}
Pre-Preliminary	Pre-Preliminary		Bronze^{3}		
Preliminary	Preliminary		Bronze^{4}		
Pre-Juvenile	Pre-Juvenile	Pre-Juvenile	Bronze		
Juvenile	Juvenile	Juvenile	Bronze	Juvenile	Bronze^{5}
Intermediate	Intermediate	Intermediate	Silver	Intermediate	Bronze^{5}
Novice	Novice	Novice	Silver	Novice	Bronze
Junior	Junior	Junior	Gold	Junior	Silver
Senior	Senior	Senior	Gold	Senior	Gold

^{1}The test panel consists of three test judges of these levels or higher, appointed in single/pairs or dance for MIF or in single/pairs for FS.
^{2}The test panel consists of three dance test judges of these levels or higher.
^{3}A single bronze or higher test judge, appointed in single/pairs or dance for MIF or in single/pairs for FS, may also judge this level.
^{4}A single silver or higher test judge, appointed in single/pairs or dance for MIF or in single/pairs for FS, may also judge this level.
^{5}A single silver or higher dance test judge may also judge this level.

=== Adult track levels ===
Moves in the field	Free skate	Pairs	MIF, FS, pairs panel^{1}	Free dance	Free dance panel^{2}
Adult Pre-Bronze	Adult Pre-Bronze		Bronze^{3}	Adult Pre-Bronze	Bronze^{4}
Adult Bronze	Adult Bronze	Adult Bronze	Bronze^{5}	Adult Bronze	Bronze^{4}
Adult Silver	Adult Silver	Adult Silver	Bronze	Adult Silver	Bronze
Adult Gold	Adult Gold	Adult Gold	Silver	Adult Gold	Silver

^{1}The test panel consists of three test judges of these levels or higher, appointed in single/pairs or dance for MIF or in single/pairs for FS.
^{2}The test panel consists of three dance test judges of these levels or higher.
^{3}A single bronze or higher test judge, appointed in single/pairs or dance for MIF or in single/pairs for FS, may also judge this level.
^{4}A single silver or higher dance test judge may also judge this level.
^{5}A single silver or higher test judge, appointed in single/pairs or dance for MIF or in single/pairs for FS, may also judge this level.

=== Pattern dance ===
The Compulsory dance was renamed pattern dance. (Note: In June 2010, the ISU replaced the name "compulsory dance" with "pattern dance". p.2, Section I.1.1.b), "ISU Communication 1621", International Skating Union, (accessed July 19, 2011).) (Note: U.S. Figure Skating also adopted the name "pattern dance" in 2011. p.32, "2011–12 Tests Book", U.S. Figure Skating, (accessed July 19, 2011).)

Each level of pattern dance, with the exception of international, consists of three or four individual dances. Preliminary skaters must pass the Dutch Waltz, Canasta Tango, and Rhythm Blues, while gold-level skaters must pass the Viennese Waltz, Westminster Waltz, Quickstep, and Argentine Tango. There are currently ten dances at the international level.

Level	Panel ex. Solo^{1}	Panel Solo^{2}
Preliminary, Solo Preliminary	Bronze^{3}	Bronze
Pre-Bronze, (Standard, Adult, Masters and Solo)	Bronze^{4}	Bronze
Bronze (Standard, Adult, Masters and Solo)	Bronze	Bronze
Pre-Silver (Standard, Adult, Masters and Solo)	Bronze	Bronze
Silver (Standard, Adult, Masters and Solo)	Silver	Silver
Pre-Gold (Standard, Adult, Masters and Solo)	Silver	Silver
Gold (Standard, Adult, Masters and Solo)	Gold	Gold
International (Standard, Adult and Masters)	Gold	

^{1}The test panel consists of three dance test judges of these levels or higher.
^{2}The test panel consists of one or three dance test judges of these levels or higher.
^{3}A single bronze or higher dance test judge may also judge this level.
^{4}A single silver or higher dance test judge may also judge this level.

=== Synchronized skating ===
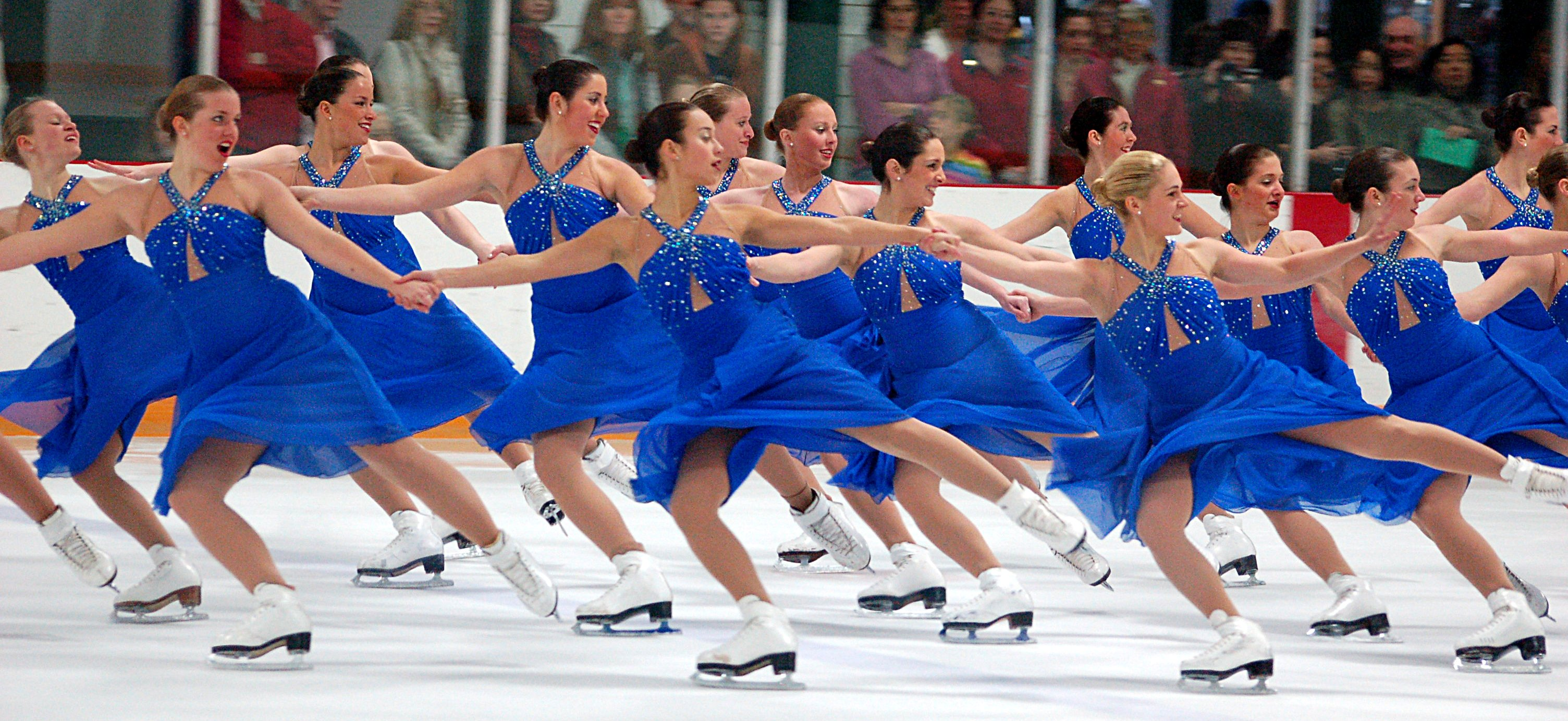
Synchronized skating team the Haydenettes in 2006.

Synchronized skating teams are not required to pass any tests as a whole. Each individual team member must have passed the appropriate moves-in-the-field test.

Team	Individual
Senior	Novice
Junior	Intermediate
Novice	Juvenile
Intermediate	Pre-Juvenile
Juvenile	Preliminary
Preliminary	(none)
Collegiate	Juvenile
Adult	Adult Bronze^{1}
Masters	(none)
Pre-Juvenile	(none)
Open Juvenile	Pre-Preliminary
Open Adult	(none)
Open Collegiate	(none)

^{1}Preliminary moves in the field, dance, or figure is also acceptable.

== Qualifying and international competitions ==
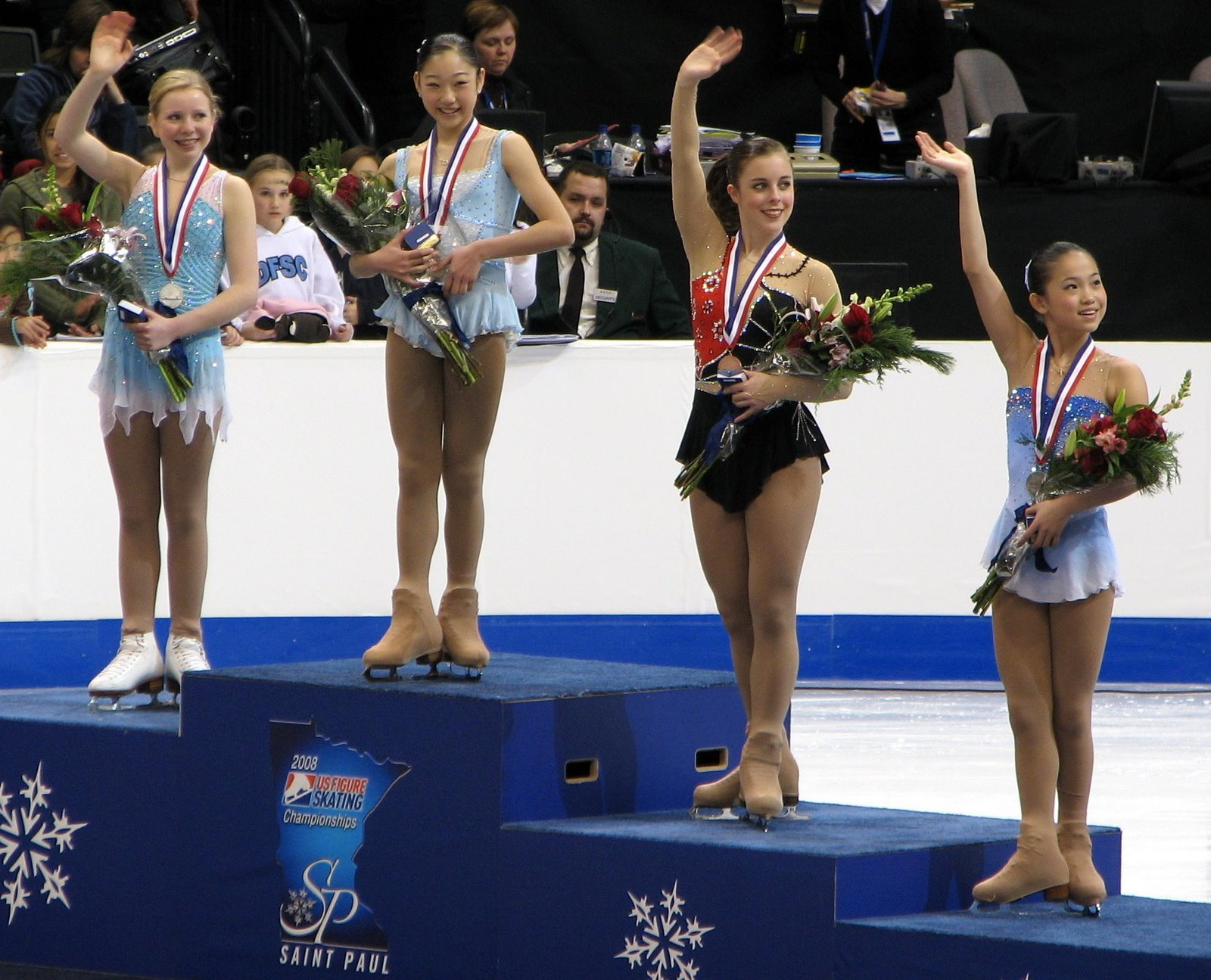
The senior ladies podium at the 2008 U.S. Championships. Gold: Mirai Nagasu; Silver: Rachael Flatt; Bronze: Ashley Wagner; Pewter: Caroline Zhang.

Every year, U.S. Figure Skating sanctions numerous non-qualifying competitions, shows, and carnivals. In addition, it annually sanctions qualifying regional and sectional competitions, in various disciplines, that lead up to championship competitions. The Association also selects those athletes and officials that represent the United States at international competitions.

=== Regional competitions ===
The following regional competitions are held in singles skating:

Singles
New England Regional Figure Skating Championships
North Atlantic Regional Figure Skating Championships
South Atlantic Regional Figure Skating Championships
Eastern Great Lakes Regional Figure Skating Championships
Upper Great Lakes Regional Figure Skating Championships
Southwestern Regional Figure Skating Championships
Northwest Pacific Regional Figure Skating Championships
Central Pacific Regional Figure Skating Championships
Southwest Pacific Regional Figure Skating Championships

=== Sectional competitions ===
The following sectional competitions are held in singles, pairs, ice dance, adult, and synchronized skating:

Singles, Pairs, Ice Dance	Adult	Synchronized
Eastern Sectional; Figure Skating Championships	Eastern Adult Sectional; Figure Skating Championships	Eastern Synchronized Skating; Sectional Championships
Midwestern Sectional; Figure Skating Championships	Midwestern Adult Sectional; Figure Skating Championships	Midwestern Synchronized Skating; Sectional Championships
Pacific Coast Sectional; Figure Skating Championships	Pacific Coast Adult; Sectional Figure Skating Championships	Pacific Coast Synchronized Skating; Sectional Championships

=== Championship competitions ===
The following championship competitions are held in singles, pairs, ice dance, synchronized, adult, and collegiate skating:

U.S. Figure Skating; Championships*	U.S. Synchronized; Skating; Championships	U.S. Adult; Figure Skating; Championships	U.S. Collegiate; Figure Skating; Championships	U.S. Intercollegiate; Figure Skating; Championships

* Effective September 1, 2012, the U.S. Junior Championships (for Juvenile and Intermediate level competitors) was eliminated and those levels are held in conjunction with the U.S. Championships.

=== International competitions ===
U.S. Figure Skating selects the athletes and officials that represent the United States at international figure skating competitions (Team USA). These competitions include the ISU Junior Grand Prix, Four Continents Figure Skating Championships, the ISU Grand Prix, the World Synchronized Skating Championships, the World Figure Skating Championships, and the Olympic Games. Although the participants for Worlds and the Olympics are most often the top placers at US Nationals, there have been several times when other skaters have been selected due to injuries preventing them from competing at Nationals; Nancy Kerrigan being selected for the 1994 Olympics over 2nd-place finisher Michelle Kwan is one example. Most recently 2014 4th-place finisher Ashley Wagner was selected over 3rd place Mirai Nagasu ostensibly because of Wagner's more consistent international record; however, because of Wagner's many endorsement contracts, her selection has raised concerns about the fairness of the process (since U.S. Championships are not used as a straightforward Olympic trials).

== Media ==
- Skating magazine is the official publication of U.S. Figure Skating. Established in 1923, 11 issues are published annually.
- The association also houses the World Figure Skating Museum and Hall of Fame at its headquarters building in Colorado Springs, Colorado.
- U.S. Figure Skating maintains two Internet domains, usfsa.org, established in 1997 and usfigureskating.org, established in 2003.

=== Ice Network ===
In 2005, U.S. Figure Skating partnered with MLB Advanced Media to set up Ice Network, LLC. Ice Network, LLC is a wholly owned by U.S. Figure Skating. In 2018, Ice Network's website closed.

== Memorial fund ==
=== Formation and purpose ===
On February 15, 1961, the entire United States figure skating team was killed when Sabena Flight 548 crashed en route from New York City to Brussels, Belgium. The team was going to participate in the 1961 World Figure Skating Championships in Prague, Czechoslovakia. Among the team members that perished were 18 athletes, seven coaches and managers, three judges and referees, and six team family members. Within one week of the tragedy, the association announced the formation of a memorial fund in honor of the lost team members.

"The mission of the Memorial Fund is to provide qualified U.S. Figure Skating members in need of financial aid with monetary assistance to pursue their goals both inside and outside the competitive arena. The fund is committed to awarding skating and academic scholarships to those athletes who have demonstrated excellent competitive results and/or academic achievements, and who have potential in national and international competitions."

=== Potomac River crash ===
On January 29, 2025, 14 members of U.S. figure skating community died in the crash of American Eagle flight 5342.

=== RISE ===
In 2009, U.S. Figure Skating commissioned the production of a full-length feature documentary film commemorating the 50th anniversary of the loss of the 1961 U.S. World Figure Skating Championship team and exalting figure skating in the U.S. The movie, RISE, was produced and directed by the Emmy-award-winning company, Lookalike Productions of Englewood, NJ. The film was released on February 17, 2011, for a one-night presentation through NCM Fathom. It was shown again for an encore presentation on March 7, 2011. Proceeds of the movie were used to further the mission of the Memorial Fund.
