= 1986 World Junior Figure Skating Championships =

- Type: ISU Championship
- Date: December 9 – 14, 1985
- Season: 1985–86
- Location: Sarajevo, SFR Yugoslavia
- Previous: 1985 World Junior Championships
- Next: 1987 World Junior Championships

The 1986 World Junior Figure Skating Championships were held on December 9–14, 1985 in Sarajevo, SFR Yugoslavia. The event was sanctioned by the International Skating Union and open to ISU member nations. Medals were awarded in the disciplines of men's singles, ladies' singles, pair skating, and ice dancing.

== Results ==
=== Men ===
Rank	Name	Nation	TFP	CF	SP	FS
1	Vladimir Petrenko	Soviet Union	2.0	1	1	1
2	Rudy Galindo	United States	5.4	2	1	3
3	Yuriy Tsymbalyuk	Soviet Union	6.6	3	5	2
4	Michael Shmerkin	Soviet Union	9.8			2
5	Todd Eldredge	United States	10.6			
6	Sean Abram	Australia	14.6			
7	Jaroslav Suchý	Czechoslovakia				
8	Jung Sung-il	South Korea				
9	Jochen Dachtler	West Germany				
10	Tomoaki Koyama	Japan				
11	Axel Médéric	France				
12	Brent Frank	Canada				
13	Philippe Candeloro	France				
14	Daisuke Nishikawa	Japan				
15	Cornel Gheorghe	Romania				
16	Cory Watson	Canada				
17	Horst Hehn	Austria				
18	Péter Kovács	Hungary				
19	Liu Wei	China				
20	David Praprotnik	Yugoslavia				
WD	Peter Fuchs	West Germany				

=== Ladies ===
Rank	Name	Nation	TFP	CF	SP	FS
1	Natalia Gorbenko	Soviet Union	3.4	2	3	1
2	Susanne Becher	West Germany	6.4		1	4
3	Linda Florkevich	Canada	8.6			2
4	Inga Gauter	East Germany	14.0		2	
5	Mari Asanuma	Japan	14.2			
6	Natalia Skrabnevskaya	Soviet Union	17.2			
7	Gina Fulton	United Kingdom				
8	Holly Cook	United States				
9	Masako Kawai	Japan				
10	Ekaterina Denisenko	Soviet Union				
11	Jana Sjodin	United States		1	15	
12	Cornelia Renner	West Germany				
13	Florence Albert	France				
14	Dianne Takeuchi	Canada				
15	Scarlett Fajfr	West Germany				
16	Željka Čižmešija	Yugoslavia				
17	Kathrin Schroter	Switzerland				
18	Yvonne Pokorny	Austria				
19	Jana Petrušková	Czechoslovakia				
20	Zhang Bo	China				
21	Paola Tosi	Italy				
22	Ines Klubal	Sweden				
23	Tracy-Lee Brook	Australia		23		
24	Anisette Torp-Lind	Denmark				
25	Ji Hyun-jung	South Korea				
26	Carine Herrijgers	Belgium				
27	Codruta Moiseanu	Romania				

=== Pairs ===
Rank	Name	Nation	TFP	SP	FS
1	Elena Leonova / Gennadi Krasnitski	Soviet Union	2.2	3	1
2	Irina Mironenko / Dmitri Shkidchenko	Soviet Union	2.4	1	2
3	Ekaterina Murugova / Artem Torgashev	Soviet Union	3.8	2	3
4	Mandy Hannebauer / Marno Kreft	East Germany			
5	Kristi Yamaguchi / Rudy Galindo	United States			
6	Ginger Tse / Archie Tse	United States			
7	Isabelle Brasseur / Pascal Courchesne	Canada			
8	Laura Ivanich / James Ivanich	Canada			
9	Penny Schultz / Scott Grover	Canada			
10	Fleur Armstrong / Mark Edney	Australia			

=== Ice dancing ===
Rank	Name	Nation	
1	Elena Krykanova / Evgeni Platov	Soviet Union	2.0
2	Svetlana Serkeli / Andrei Zharkov	Soviet Union	4.0
3	Corinne Paliard / Didier Courtois	France	6.0
4	Melanie Cole / Martin Smith	Canada	
5	Dominique Yvon / Frédéric Palluel	France	
6	Michela Malingambi / Andrea Gilardi	Italy	
7	Catherine Pal / Donald Godfrey	Canada	
8	Anna Croci / Luca Mantovani	Italy	
9	Andrea Juklová / Martin Šimeček	Czechoslovakia	
10	Jennifer Benz / Jeffrey Benz	United States	
11	Amanda Worthington / Andrew Place	United Kingdom	
12	Krisztina Kerekes / Csaba Szentpétery	United States	
13	Jolanta Zagórska / Andrzej Sząszor	Poland	
14	Desiree Schlegel / Patrick Brecht	Switzerland	
15	Lyn Webb / Duncan Smart	Australia	
