= 1987 World Junior Figure Skating Championships =

- Type: ISU Championship
- Date: December 2 – 7, 1986
- Season: 1986–87
- Location: Kitchener, Ontario, Canada
- Host: Skate Canada
- Previous: 1986 World Junior Championships
- Next: 1988 World Junior Championships

The 1987 World Junior Figure Skating Championships were held on December 2–7, 1986 in Kitchener, Ontario, Canada. The event was sanctioned by the International Skating Union and open to ISU member nations. Medals were awarded in the disciplines of men's singles, ladies' singles, pair skating, and ice dancing.

== Results ==
=== Men ===
Rank	Name	Nation	TFP	CF	SP	FS
1	Rudy Galindo	United States				1
2	Todd Eldredge	United States				
3	Yuriy Tsymbalyuk	Soviet Union		1	2	
4	Cameron Birky	United States				
5	Daniel Weiss	West Germany				
6	Michael Shmerkin	Soviet Union		16	5	
7	Sergei Dudakov	Soviet Union				
8	Éric Millot	France				
9	Brent Frank	Canada		7		15
10	Jaroslav Suchý	Czechoslovakia				
11	Sean Abram	Australia				
12	Tomoaki Koyama	Japan				
13	Daisuke Nishikawa	Japan				
14	Rico Krahnert	East Germany				
15	Oliver Dechert	West Germany				
16	Alcuin Schulten	Netherlands				
17	Cornel Gheorghe	Romania				
18	Jung Sung-il	South Korea				
19	Steven Cousins	United Kingdom				
20	Alexandre Geers	Belgium				
21	Liu Wei	China				
22	Geoffrey Blee	Australia				
23	Claudio Fico	Italy				
24	Christopher Blong	New Zealand				
25	Armin Withalm	Austria				

=== Ladies ===
Rank	Name	Nation	TFP	CF	SP	FS
1	Cindy Bortz	United States		3	1	1
2	Susanne Becher	West Germany		1	2	2
3	Shannon Allison	Canada		4	3	
4	Holly Cook	United States		2		
5	Natalia Skrabnevskaya	Soviet Union			4	
6	Inga Gauter	East Germany				
7	Junko Yaginuma	Japan				
8	Kyoko Ina	Japan				
9	I. Kuzmina	Soviet Union				
10	Claude Péri	France				
11	Patricia Wirth	West Germany				
12	Angie Folk	Canada		6	13	
13	Anisette Torp-Lind	Denmark				
14	Jana Petrušková	Czechoslovakia				
15	Fiona Ritchie	United Kingdom				
16	Gina Fulton	United Kingdom				
17	Sandy Suy	Belgium				
18	Ines Klubal	Sweden				
19	Ji Hyun-jung	South Korea				
20	Kimberley Price	Australia				
21	Belinda Leiter	Austria				
22	Zhang Bo	China				
23	Rosanna Blong	New Zealand				
24	Katalin Rózsa	Hungary				

=== Pairs ===
Rank	Name	Nation
1	Elena Leonova / Gennadi Krasnitski	Soviet Union
2	Ekaterina Murugova / Artem Torgashev	Soviet Union
3	Kristi Yamaguchi / Rudy Galindo	United States
4	Mandy Hannebauer / Marno Kreft	East Germany
5	Irina Saifutdinova / Andrei Bardykin	Soviet Union
6	Ginger Tse / Archie Tse	United States
7	Jody Barnes / Rob Williams	Canada
8	Marie-Josée Fortin / Jean-Michel Bombardier	Canada
9	Catherine Barker / Neil Herring	United Kingdom
10	Chen Liling / Qiu Wenjun	China

=== Ice dancing ===
Rank	Name	Nation
1	Ilona Melnichenko / Gennadi Kaskov	Soviet Union
2	Oksana Grishuk / Alexandr Chichkov	Soviet Union
3	Catherine Pal / Donald Godfrey	Canada
4	Anna Croci / Luca Mantovani	Italy
5	Sophie Moniotte / Pascal Lavanchy	France
6	Ivana Střondalová / Milan Brzý	Czechoslovakia
7	Jacqueline Petr / Mark Janoschak	Canada
8	Krisztina Kerekes / Csaba Szentpétery	Hungary
9	Elizabeth Punsalan / David Shirk	United States
10	Vera Zietemann / Andreas Ullmann	West Germany
11	Christelle Gautier / Alberick Dalongeville	France
12	Jennifer Goolsbee / Peter Chupa	United States
13	Natasha Smith / Paul Knepper	United Kingdom
14	Di Liu / Ye Fu	China
15	Lynette Webb / Duncan Smart	Australia
