= 1985 World Junior Figure Skating Championships =

- Type: ISU Championship
- Date: December 11 – 16, 1984
- Season: 1984–85
- Location: Colorado Springs, Colorado, United States
- Host: U.S. Figure Skating
- Previous: 1984 World Junior Championships
- Next: 1986 World Junior Championships

The 1985 World Junior Figure Skating Championships were held on December 11–16, 1984 in Colorado Springs, Colorado, United States. The event was sanctioned by the International Skating Union and open to ISU member nations. Medals were awarded in the disciplines of men's singles, ladies' singles, pair skating, and ice dancing.

== Results ==
=== Men ===
Rank	Name	Nation	TFP	CF	SP	FS
1	Erik Larson	United States	4.8	5	2	1
2	Vladimir Petrenko	Soviet Union	5.0	1	1	4
3	Rudy Galindo	United States	8.6	9	3	2
4	Craig Burns	Canada	11.6			
5	Michael Shmerkin	Soviet Union	11.8			
6	Daniel Weiss	West Germany	12.2	2	5	9
7	Oula Jääskeläinen	Finland				
8	Axel Médéric	France				
9	Jeffrey Partrick	Canada		6	10	
10	Hiroshi Sugiyama	Japan				
11	Rudy Lucioni	France				
12	Tomoaki Koyama	Japan				
13	Péter Kovács	Hungary				
14	Charles Wildridge	United Kingdom				
15	Tomislav Čižmešija	Yugoslavia				
16	Sean Abram	Australia				
WD	Christopher Blong	New Zealand				

=== Ladies ===
Rank	Name	Nation	TFP	CF	SP	FS
1	Tatiana Andreeva	Soviet Union	3.8	4	1	1
2	Susanne Becher	West Germany	5.0	2	2	3
3	Natalia Gorbenko	Soviet Union	6.8	6	3 (tie)	2
4	Tracy Ernst	United States	10.0	3	8	6
5	Jana Sjodin	United States	10,8	1	3 (tie)	9
6	Izumi Aotani	Japan				
7	Cornelia Renner	West Germany				
8	Rosmarie Sakic	Canada		8	6	
9	Susan MacKay	Canada		7	5	
10	Yukiko Kashihara	Japan				
11	Tamara Téglássy	Hungary				
12	Birgitta Andersson	Sweden				
13	Nathalie Infrandi	France				
14	Željka Čižmešija	Yugoslavia				
15	Susan Knott	United Kingdom				
16	Pinnucia Ferrario	Italy				
17	Sabine Schwarz	Switzerland				
18	Anuli Nieminen	Finland				
19	Pauline Lee	Chinese Taipei				
20	Ji Hyun-jung	South Korea				
21	Sabine Lischka	Austria				
22	Popi Geros	Australia				
23	Carine Herrijgers	Belgium				
24	Sandra Escoda	Spain				

=== Pairs ===
Rank	Name	Nation	TFP	SP	FS
1	Ekaterina Gordeeva / Sergei Grinkov	Soviet Union			
2	Irina Mironenko / Dmitri Shkidchenko	Soviet Union			
3	Elena Gud / Evgeni Koltun	Soviet Union			
4	Shelley Propson / Jerod Swallow	United States		4	
5	Penny Schultz / Scott Grover	Canada			
6	Isabelle Brasseur / Pascal Courchesne	Canada			
7	Lisa Cushley / Neil Cushley	United Kingdom			
8	Ginger Tse / Archie Tse	United States			

=== Ice dancing ===
Rank	Name	Nation	TFP	CF	SP	FS
1	Elena Krykanova / Evgeni Platov	Soviet Union		1	1	1
2	Svetlana Liapina / Georgi Sur	Soviet Union		2	3	2
3	Doriane Bontemps / Charles Paliard	France		3	2	3
4	Jodie Balogh / Jerod Swallow	United States		4	4	4
5	Svetlana Serkeli / Andrei Zharkov	Soviet Union				
6	Corinne Paliard / Didier Courtois	France				
7	Melanie Cole / Donald Godfrey	Canada				
8	Michela Malingambi / Andrea Gilardi	Italy				
9	Catherine Pal / Kelly Marshall	Canada				
10	Éva Száraz / László Partos	Hungary				
11	Monica MacDonald / Rodney Clarke	Australia				
12	Anna Croci / Luca Mantovani	Italy				
13	Suzanne Murphy / Andrew Niebler	United States				
14	Cheryl Rushton / Mark Poole	United Kingdom				
