= 1983 World Junior Figure Skating Championships =

- Type: ISU Championship
- Date: December 14 – 19, 1982
- Season: 1982–83
- Location: Sarajevo, SFR Yugoslavia
- Previous: 1982 World Junior Championships
- Next: 1984 World Junior Championships

The 1983 World Junior Figure Skating Championships were held on December 14–19, 1982 in Sarajevo, SFR Yugoslavia. Commonly called "World Juniors" and "Junior Worlds", the event determined the World Junior champions in the disciplines of men's singles, ladies' singles, pair skating, and ice dancing.

== Results ==
=== Men ===
Rank	Name	Nation	TFP	CF	SP	FS
1	Christopher Bowman	United States	2.8	1	3	1
2	Philippe Roncoli	France	5.8	5	2	3
3	Nils Köpp	East Germany	8.8	2		
4	Marc Joseph Ferland	Canada	9.2	3		
5	Yuri Bureiko	Soviet Union	9.8		1	6
6	Makoto Kano	Japan				
7	Erik Larson	United States		13		
8	Andrzej Strzelec	Poland				
9	Frédéric Harpagès	France				
10	Vladimir Petrenko	Soviet Union				
11	Kevin Boroczky	Australia				
12	Tomislav Čižmešija	Yugoslavia				
13	Hiroshi Sugiyama	Japan				
14	Lars Dresler	Denmark				
15	Ralph Burghart	Austria				
16	Jeffrey Patrick	Canada		12		
17	Luo Changyu	China				
18	Gábor Gagyor	Hungary				
19	Cho Jae-hyung	South Korea				

=== Ladies ===
Rank	Name	Nation	TFP	CF	SP	FS
1	Simone Koch	East Germany	3.2	3	1	1
2	Karin Hendschke	East Germany		2		
3	Parthena Sarafidis	Austria	7.6	1		
4	Nelli Dvalishvili	Soviet Union	9.6			
5	Sachie Yuki	Japan	11.2	14	2	2
6	Monica Lipson	Canada				
7	Melissa Murphy	Canada				
8	Claudia Villiger	Switzerland				
9	Susan Bohring	West Germany				
10	Elise Ahonen	Finland				
11	Coralie Barbazan	France				
12	Željka Čižmešija	Yugoslavia				
13	Judith De Bie	Belgium				
14	Rachel Ravenhill	United Kingdom				
15	Beatrice Gelmini	Italy				
16	Susanne Seger	Sweden				
17	Diana Zovko-Nicolic	Australia				
18	Judit Szalay	Hungary				
19	Fu Caishu	China				
20	Vibecke Sorensen	Norway				
21	Ji Hyun-jung	South Korea				
22	Anna Parramon	Spain				

=== Pairs ===
Rank	Name	Nation	TFP	SP	FS
1	Marina Avstriyskaya / Yuri Kvashnin	Soviet Union	1.8	2	1
2	Peggy Seidel / Ralf Seifert	East Germany	3.2	3	2
3	Inna Bekker / Sergei Likhanski	Soviet Union	3.4	1	3
4	Manuela Landgraf / Ingo Steuer	East Germany	5.6	4	4
5	Irina Shishova / Alexei Suleimanov	Soviet Union	7.0	5	5
6	Susan Dungjen / Jason Dungjen	United States			
7	Danielle Carr / Stephen Carr	Australia			
8	Lisa Cushley / Neil Cushley	United Kingdom			
9	Sun Jihong / Fan Jun	China			

=== Ice dancing ===
Rank	Name	Nation	CD
1	Tatiana Gladkova / Igor Shpilband	Soviet Union	1
2	Elena Novikova / Oleg Bliakhman	Soviet Union	2
3	Christina Yatsuhashi / Keith Yatsuhashi	United States	7
4	Christine Chiniard / Martial Mette	France	3
5	Christine Horton / Michael Farrington	Canada	4
6	Jo-Anne Borlase / Scott Chalmers	Canada	5
7	Colleen McGuire / Bill Lyons	United States	6
8	Svetlana Liapina / Georgi Sur	Soviet Union	10
9	Stefania Calegari / Pasquale Camerlengo	Italy	8
10	Klára Engi / Attila Tóth	Hungary	9
11	Doriane Bontemps / Charles Paliard	France	12
12	Alison Perrigo / Michael Harding	United Kingdom	11
13	Su-Wan Yip / Robert Newton	United Kingdom	14
14	Beata Kawelczyk / Tomasz Politanski	Poland	13
15	Aasa Agblad / Nils Kleen	Sweden	15
16	Vicky Hinger / Robert Hinger	Luxembourg	16
