= 1984 World Junior Figure Skating Championships =

- Type: ISU Championship
- Date: December 5 – 11, 1983
- Season: 1983–84
- Location: Sapporo, Japan
- Venue: Makomanai Ice Arena

Champions
- Men's singles: (Soviet Union) Victor Petrenko
- Ladies' singles: (East Germany) Karin Hendschke
- Pairs: (East Germany) Manuela Landgraf / Ingo Steuer
- Ice dance: (Soviet Union) Elena Krykanova / Evgeny Platov
- Previous: 1983 World Junior Championships
- Next: 1985 World Junior Championships

The 1984 World Junior Figure Skating Championships were held on December 5–11, 1983 in Sapporo, Japan. Commonly called "World Juniors" and "Junior Worlds", the event determined the World Junior champions in the disciplines of men's singles, ladies' singles, pair skating, and ice dancing. The regular senior-level NHK Trophy competition was not held that year, the World Junior Championships being held in its stead.

== Results ==
=== Men ===
Rank	Name	Nation	TFP	CF	SP	FS
1	Victor Petrenko	Soviet Union	3.2	3	1	1
2	Marc Ferland	Canada	4.0	2	2	2
3	Tom Cierniak	United States	7.8	1	3	6
4	Erik Larson	United States	8.0	5	5	3
5	Vladimir Petrenko	Soviet Union	8.0	4	4	4
6	Matthew Hall	Canada	11.6	7	6	5
7	Alain Miquel	France	16.4	11	7	7
8	Noritomo Taniuchi	Japan	17.8	8	10	9
9	Frédéric Lipka	France	19.0	9	9	10
10	Henrik Walentin	Denmark	20.4	12	13	8
11	Daniel Weiss	West Germany	21.2	10	8	12
12	Hiroshi Sugiyama	Japan	24.8	13	15	11
13	Pavel Vanco	Czechoslovakia	27.0	16	11	13
14	Tsiu-Yen Leigh	United Kingdom	30.0	17	12	15
15	Jung Sung-il	South Korea	30.4	18	14	14
16	Sean Abram	Australia	31.4	15	16	16
17	Zhang Weidong	China	32.2	14	17	17
WD	Tomislav Čižmešija	Yugoslavia		6	WD	

=== Ladies ===
Rank	Name	Nation	TFP	CF	SP	FS
1	Karin Hendschke	East Germany	6.6	2	6	3
2	Simone Koch	East Germany	7.4	7	3	2
3	Midori Ito	Japan	9.2	13	1	1
4	Kathryn Adams	United States	13.6	9	8	5
5	Heike Gobbers	West Germany	14.8	8	10	6
6	Irina Klimova	Soviet Union	14.8	10	2	8
7	Gigi Siegert	Austria	15.8	1	13	10
8	Constanze Gensel	East Germany	17.0	19	4	4
9	Melissa Murphy	Canada	18.4	3	14	11
10	Claudia Villiger	Switzerland	18.8	15	7	7
11	Pinuccia Ferrarid	Italy	19.4	6	17	9
12	Nathalie Sasseville	Canada	21.6	4	18	12
13	Željka Čižmešija	Yugoslavia	24.0	11	11	13
14	Veronique Degardin	France	27.2	12	15	14
15	Daniela Sarfidis	Austria	27.4	5	21	16
16	Ingrid Karl	West Germany	28.2	14	12	15

=== Pairs ===
Rank	Name	Nation	TFP	SP	FS
1	Manuela Landgraf / Ingo Steuer	East Germany	1.8	2	1
2	Susan Dungjen / Jason Dungjen	United States	3.2	3	2
3	Olga Neizvestnaya / Sergei Hudyakov	Soviet Union	3.4	1	3
4	Irina Shishova / Aleksey Suleymanov	Soviet Union	5.6	4	4
5	Ekaterina Gordeeva / Sergei Grinkov	Soviet Union	7.4	6	5
6	Penny Schultz / Scott Grover	Canada	8.8	7	6
7	Danielle Carr / Stephen Carr	Australia	9.0	5	7
8	Sonja Hoefler / Marc Druener	West Germany	11.2	8	8
9	Lisa Cushley / Neil Cushley	United Kingdom	12.6	9	9
10	Jan Waggoner / Todd Waggoner	United States	14.4	11	10
11	Jihong Sun / Jun Fan	China	15.0	10	11

=== Ice dancing ===
Rank	Name	Nation	TFP	CD	OSP	FD
1	Elena Krykanova / Evgeni Platov	Soviet Union	2.0	1	1	1
2	Christina Yatsuhashi / Keith Yatsuhashi	United States	5.0	2	2	3
3	Svetlana Liapina / Georgi Sur	Soviet Union	6.8	6	3	2
4	Christine Horton / Michael Farrington	Canada	7.4	3	4	4
5	Joanne Borlase / Scott Chalmers	Canada	9.4	4	5	5
6	Doriane Bontemps / Charles-Henri Paliard	France	11.4	5	6	6
7	Stefania Calegari / Pasquale Camerlengo	Italy	14.0	7	7	7
8	Honorata Gorna / Andrzej Dostatni	Poland	16.0	8	8	8
9	Corinne Paliard / Didier Courtois	France	18.0	9	9	9
10	Christine Goettler / Michael Loefflad	West Germany	20.0	10	10	10
11	Dana Jendriskova / Roman Sabol	Czechoslovakia	22.0	11	11	11
12	Beata Vilagos / Gabor Gagyor	Hungary	24.0	12	12	12
13	Cheryl Rushton / Mark Poole	United Kingdom	26.6	14	13	13
14	Monica Macdnald / Rodney Clarke	Australia	27.4	13	14	14
15	Luyang Liu / Xiangdong Li	China	30.0	15	15	15
