= Grishchuk =

Grischuk, Grishchuk or Grishuk is a gender-neutral Ukrainian surname. Notable people with the surname include:

- Alexander Grischuk (born 1983), Russian chess player
- Oksana Grishuk (born 1971), Russian ice dancer
