= 1982 World Junior Figure Skating Championships =

198 World Junior Figure Skating Championships
- Type: ISU Championship
- Date: 15 – 20 December 1981
- Season: 1981–82
- Location: Oberstdorf, West Germany
- Previous: 1981 World Junior Championships
- Next: 1983 World Junior Championships

The 1982 World Junior Figure Skating Championships were held on 15–20 December 1981 in Oberstdorf, West Germany. Commonly called "World Juniors" and "Junior Worlds", the event determined the World Junior champions in the disciplines of men's singles, ladies' singles, pair skating, and ice dancing.

== Results ==
=== Men ===
Rank	Name	Nation	TFP	CF	SP	FS
1	Scott Williams	United States	2.0	1	1	1
2	Paul Guerrero	United States	4.4	2	3	2
3	Alexander König	East Germany	10.2	3	11	4
4	Yuri Bureiko	Soviet Union		6	2	
5	James Cygan	United States				
6	Makoto Kano	Japan	12.8	13	5	3
7	Oliver Höner	Switzerland	14.8	4	6	10
8	Philippe Roncoli	France				
9	Lauren Patterson	Canada		5		9
10	Viktor Petrenko	Soviet Union				
11	Vladimir Petrenko	Soviet Union				
12	Atsushi Oshima	Japan				
13	Kevin Boroczky	Australia				
14	Zhang Shubin	China				
15	Daniel Weiss	West Germany				
16	Daniel Nagel	France				
17	András Száraz	Hungary				
18	Ralph Burghart	Austria				
19	Stephen Carr	Australia				
20	Fernando Soria	Spain				
21	Tomislav Čižmešija	Yugoslavia				
22	Lars Dresler	Denmark				

=== Ladies ===
Rank	Name	Nation	TFP	CF	SP	FS
1	Janina Wirth	East Germany		4		
2	Cornelia Tesch	West Germany		1		
3	Elizabeth Manley	Canada		7	2	
4	Jill Frost	United States				
5	Kelly Webster	United States		3		
6	Midori Ito	Japan		19	1	1
7	Heike Gobbers	West Germany				
8	Parthena Sarafidis	Austria		2		
9	Marina Serova	Soviet Union				
10	Mirella Grazia	Switzerland				
11	Inna Krundisheva	Soviet Union				
12	Katrien Pauwels	Belgium				
13	Li Scha Wang	Netherlands				
14	Denise Gotts	United Kingdom				
15	Veronique Degardin	France				
16	Petra Malivuk	Yugoslavia				
17	Tine-Mai Krian	Norway				
18	Beatrice Gelmini	Italy				
19	Tamara Téglássy	Hungary				
20	Henriette Mingon	Denmark				
21	Natacha Viel	Australia				
22	Susanna Mexia	Spain				
23	Fu Caishu	China				
WD	Marie Bergquist	Sweden				

=== Pairs ===
Rank	Name	Nation
1	Marina Avstriyskaya / Yuri Kvashnin	Soviet Union
2	Inna Bekker / Sergei Likhanski	Soviet Union
3	Babette Preussler / Torsten Ohlow	East Germany
4	Marina Nikitiuk / Rashid Kadyrkaev	Soviet Union
5	Bettina Hage / Stefan Zins	West Germany
6	Lynda Ivanich / John Ivanich	Canada
7	Natalie Seybold / Wayne Seybold	United States
8	Gaby Galambos / Jorg Galambos	Switzerland
9	Amy Grossman / Robert Davenport	United States
10	Carol Nelson / Carl Nelson	United Kingdom
11	Lisa Cushley / Neil Cushley	United Kingdom
12	Sun Lu / Wang Qingyuan	China
13	Danielle Carr / Stephen Carr	Australia
14	Nicole Baurycza / Rodney Baurycza	Australia
15	Adelheid De Roovere / Koenraad Cheater De Roovere	Belgium

=== Ice dancing ===
Rank	Name	Nation
1	Natalia Annenko / Vadim Karkachev	Soviet Union
2	Tatiana Gladkova / Igor Shpilband	Soviet Union
3	Lynda Malek / Alexander Miller	United States
4	Sophie Merigot / Philippe Berthe	France
5	Viera Mináríková / Ivan Havránek	Czechoslovakia
6	Elena Novikova / Oleg Bliakhman	Soviet Union
7	Alison Perrigo / Michael Harding	United Kingdom
8	Isabelle Cousin / Gilles Vandenbroeck	France
9	Deanna Poirier / Brett Schrader	Canada
10	Kathrin Beck / Christoff Beck	Austria
11	Klára Engi / Attila Tóth	Hungary
12	Christine Gottler / Niklas Heyenbrock	West Germany
13	Christine Horton / Michael Farrington	Canada
14	Angela Ogden / Alan Towers	United Kingdom
15	Barbara Riboldi / Davide Petrucceli	Italy
