= Marc Ferland =

Marc Ferland may refer to:

- Marc Ferland (politician) (born 1942), Progressive Conservative member of the Canadian House of Commons
- Marc Ferland (figure skater), retired Canadian figure skater
