= Zhang Bo =

Zhang Bo or Bo Zhang may refer to:

- Li Yan (Wu) (died 918), politician of the Tang dynasty and Wu state
- Zhang Bo (footballer) (born 1985), Chinese footballer
- Zhang Bo (actor), Chinese actor
- Zhang Bo (figure skater), Chinese female figure skater
