= Gennady Kaskov =

Soviet ice dancer (born 1970)

Personal information
- Born: 1970 (age 55–56) Odessa, Ukrainian SSR, Soviet Union

Figure skating career
- Country: Soviet Union
- Retired: 1991

Gennady Kaskov (Ukrainian: Геннадій Каськов; Russian: Геннадий Касков; born 1970) is a former Soviet ice dancer. With former partner Ilona Melnichenko, he is the 1987 World Junior champion, 1990 Skate America bronze medallist, and 1991 Winter Universiade champion.

== Career ==
Originally from Odessa, Kaskov eventually moved to train in Moscow. He and his partner, Ilona Melnichenko, competed at the 1987 World Junior Championships at the Kitchener Memorial Auditorium Complex and won gold ahead of Oksana Grishuk / Alexandr Chichkov. As seniors, Melnichenko/Kaskov won gold twice at the Nebelhorn Trophy and bronze at the 1990 Skate America. After winning the 1991 Winter Universiade, the duo retired from competition.

Kaskov began coaching in Burnaby, British Columbia and then in Swan River, Manitoba. He worked at British Columbia's Centre of Excellence, the York Region Skating Academy, and Kitchener-Waterloo Skating Club, with his students including Kevin Reynolds, Matt McEwan, and Brandon Armstrong. In 2013, Kaskov began coaching at the New Hamburg Skating Club at the Wilmot Recreation Complex. He teaches private lessons at the Midsouth Ice House in Olive Branch, Mississippi.

Kaskov is an international technical specialist for Canada.

== Results ==
(with Melnichenko)

International
Event	86–87	87–88	88–89	89–90	90–91
Skate Canada				4th	
Skate America					3rd
Prize of Moscow News			3rd		
Nebelhorn Trophy		1st	1st		
Winter Universiade			2nd		1st
International: Junior
World Junior Champ.	1st				
National
Soviet Champ.					3rd
