= Dmitri Shkidchenko =

Ukrainian figure skater (died 2023)

Dmytro Shkidchenko
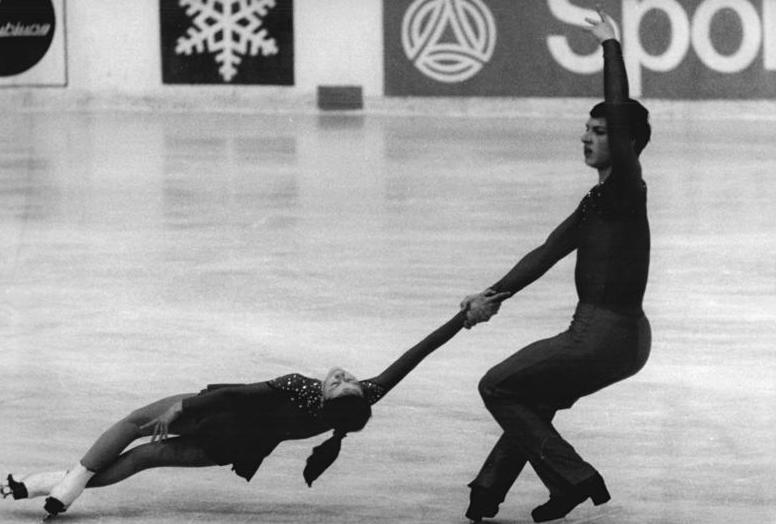
- Mironenko and Shkidchenko in 1984.

Personal information
- Native name: Дмитро Валентинович Шкідченко
- Full name: Dmytro Valentynovych Shkidchenko
- Other names: Dmitri Valentinovich Shkidchenko
- Died: 26 January 2023

Figure skating career
- Country: Soviet Union
- Partner: Irina Mironenko (former)
- Retired: 1987

Dmitri or Dmytro Valentynovych Shkidchenko (Ukrainian: Дмитро Валентинович Шкідченко or Шкидченко; died 26 January 2023) was a Ukrainian figure skating coach and pair skater who competed internationally for the Soviet Union. With his skating partner Irina Mironenko, he was the 1985 and 1986 World Junior silver medalist.

== Personal life ==
Shkidchenko was married to Anastasia Makarova, the general secretary of the Ukrainian Figure Skating Federation. He died on 26 January 2023.

== Career ==
Shkidchenko competed in partnership with Irina Mironenko for the Soviet Union. In November 1984, the pair won gold at the 1984 Blue Swords in East Germany. A month later, in December 1984, the pair won silver at the 1985 World Junior Championships in Colorado Springs, Colorado, where they finished second to Ekaterina Gordeeva / Sergei Grinkov.

In December 1985, Mironenko/Shkidchenko were awarded silver at the 1986 World Junior Championships in Sarajevo. They were second to Elena Leonova / Gennadi Krasnitski.

After retiring from competition, Shkidchenko coached the following skaters:

- Ivan Pavlov
- Alina Dikhtiar / Filip Zalevski
- Julia Beloglazova / Andrei Bekh
- Julia Obertas / Dmitri Palamarchuk
- Tatiana Chuvaeva / Dmitri Palamarchuk
- Julia Lavrentieva / Yuri Rudyk
- Kyrylo Marsak
- Fedir Kulish

== Results ==
(with Mironenko)

| Event | 1984–85 | 1985–86 | 1986–87 |
|---|---|---|---|
| World Junior Championships | 2nd | 2nd | |
| Blue Swords | 1st | | |
| St. Ivel International | | | 5th |
