= Dmitri Lagutin =

Soviet ice dancer

Figure skating career
- Country: Soviet Union

Dmitri Lagutin is a former ice dancer who competed for the Soviet Union. He is the 1989 World Junior champion with partner Angelika Kirkhmaier. Originally from Almaty, he was coached by Yuri Guskov before moving to Natalia Linichuk.
