= Luca Mantovani =

Italian figure skater

Personal information
- Born: 7 October 1968 (age 57) Monza, Italy
- Height: 1.74 m (5 ft 8 1/2 in)

Figure skating career
- Country: Italy
- Retired: 1992

Luca Mantovani (born 7 October 1968) is an Italian ice dancing coach and former competitor. With Anna Croci, he is the 1987 Grand Prix International St. Gervais champion, 1990 Nations Cup bronze medalist, and 1992 Lysiane Lauret Challenge bronze medalist. The two represented Italy at the 1992 Winter Olympics.

== Personal life ==
Mantovani was born 7 October 1968 in Monza, Italy. He is married to former single skater Tony Bombardieri.

== Career ==
Mantovani competed for at least eight seasons with Anna Croci. During their career, they were coached by Tatiana Tarasova, Natalia Linichuk, Muriel Boucher-Zazoui, and Joan Slater.

Croci/Mantovani made their ISU Championship debut at the 1985 Junior Worlds, where they placed 12th. Two years later, they finished fourth at the 1987 Junior Worlds in Kitchener, Ontario.

Croci/Mantovani competed at three European Championships—placing as high as 8th, in 1990 (Leningrad)—and four World Championships, achieving their best result, 13th, in 1992 (Oakland, California). They were named in Italy's team to the 1992 Winter Olympics in Albertville; the duo finished 13th in France after placing 13th in both compulsory dances, 13th in the original dance, and 12th in the free dance.

Mantovani is a coach at S.S.D. S.r.l. Icelab in Bergamo.

== Competitive highlights ==
With Croci

International
Event	84–85	85–86	86–87	87–88	88–89	89–90	90–91	91–92
Olympics								13th
Worlds					15th	14th	15th	13th
Europeans					13th	8th		11th
Inter. de Paris								6th
Lysiane Lauret								3rd
Nations Cup							3rd	
Skate America						9th		8th
Skate Canada							4th	
St. Gervais				1st				
International: Junior
Junior Worlds	12th	8th	4th					
Autumn Trophy		2nd						
