= Rudy Galindo =

American figure skater

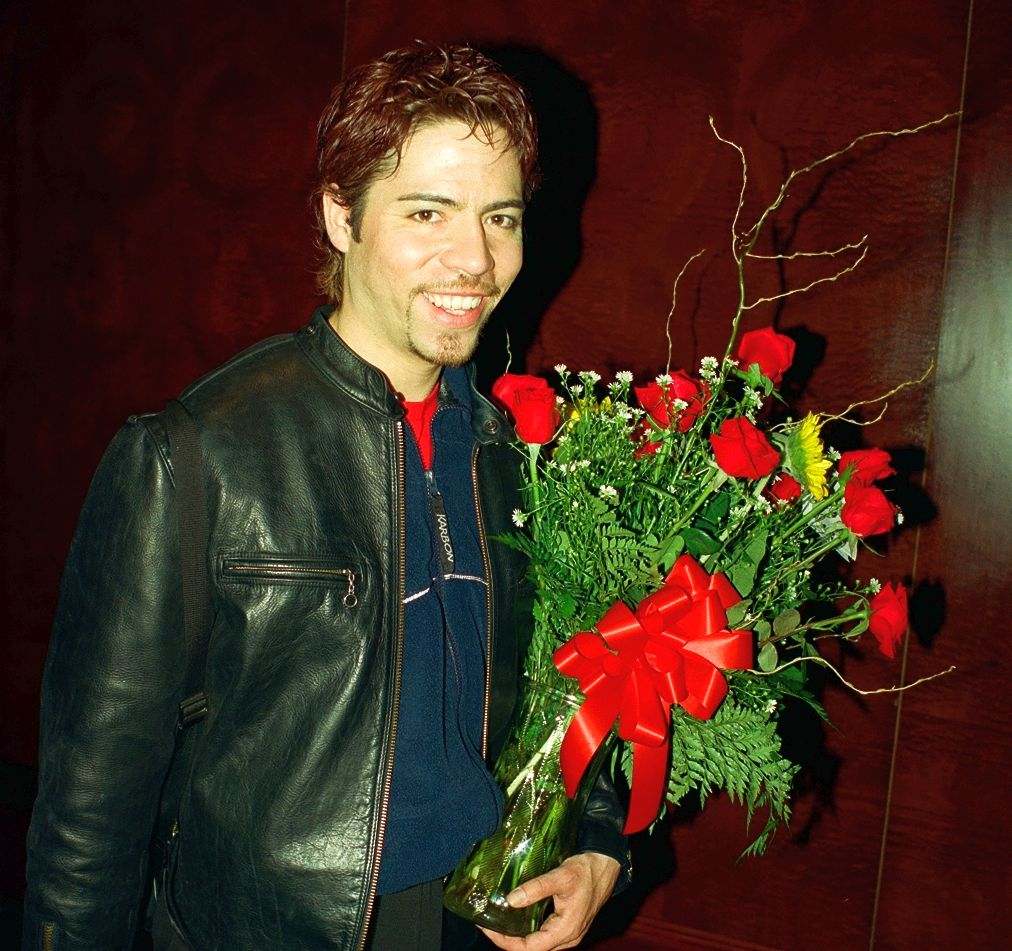
- Galindo in 1996

Personal information
- Full name: Val Joe Galindo
- Born: September 7, 1969 (age 57) San Jose, California, U.S.
- Height: 5 ft 6 in (168 cm)

Figure skating career
- Country: United States
- Discipline: Men's singles, Pairs
- Partner: Kristi Yamaguchi
- Coach: Laura Galindo-Black
- Retired: 1996
Medal record
Representing United States
Men's figure skating
World Championships
Bronze medal – third place	1996 Edmonton	Men's singles
World Junior Championships
Gold medal – first place	1987 Kitchener	Men's singles
Silver medal – second place	1986 Sarajevo	Men's singles
Bronze medal – third place	1985 Colorado Springs	Men's singles
Pairs' figure skating
World Junior Championships
Gold medal – first place	1988 Brisbane	Pairs
Bronze medal – third place	1987 Kitchener	Pairs

Val Joe "Rudy" Galindo (born September 7, 1969) is an American former competitive figure skater who competed in both single skating and pair skating. As a single skater, he is the 1996 U.S. national champion, 1987 World Junior Champion, and 1996 World Bronze medalist. As a pairs skater, he competed with Kristi Yamaguchi and was the 1988 World Junior Champion and the 1989 and 1990 U.S. National Champion. He is the first openly gay skating champion in the United States, though US, World and Olympic champion Brian Boitano came out long after his career was over.

== Career ==
Galindo began skating with his sister. Although the sport was expensive, his parents were supportive and forwent a chance to buy a house, settling instead for a larger trailer. As a singles career, Galindo won the 1987 World Junior title.

Galindo was paired with Kristi Yamaguchi by his coach, Jim Hulick. They placed 5th on the junior level at the 1985 U.S. Championships and won the junior title in 1986. Hulick died of AIDS-related cancer in 1989. Galindo did not compete in singles in the 1988–89 and 1989–90 seasons in order to concentrate on pairs. Galindo and Yamaguchi won the 1988 World Junior title and the U.S. senior championships in 1989 and 1990. Their partnership came to an end in April 1990 when Yamaguchi decided to focus on her singles career. Lacking a partner of Kristi's calibre, Galindo returned to singles competition.

Rudy Galindo's father died of a heart attack in 1993, and his brother, George, died from AIDS in 1994. Another coach, Rick Inglesi, died of AIDS in 1995. Galindo reports in his autobiography that he was grief-stricken and unmotivated by a lack of support from the skating establishment. He took eight months off after the 1995 U.S. Championships.

Galindo stated that the American judges scored his programs lower because they disliked his "unmasculine, balletic-style of skating". Christine Brennan of the Washington Post disagreed, stating that it was because he was not the best skater in the U.S. and predicted that he would never win a U.S. Championships. Figure skater writer Ellyn Kestnbaum states that Brennan must have not been paying attention to Galindo's practices during the 1995 Nationals, when he was ill with asthmatic bronchitis but was one of the best spinners in the competition. He was also the only male skater, other than his competitors Todd Eldredge and Scott Davis, who were practicing the triple Axel-triple toe loop combination jump, one of the most difficult jump combinations in competitive figure skating at the time.

The 1996 national championships were scheduled to take place in his hometown, San Jose. Galindo decided to take advantage of this opportunity to compete in front of his mother, who no longer traveled, and his hometown. He resumed training in September 1995, with his sister Laura Galindo-Black as his coach. After an artistic short program skated to Pachelbel's Canon, Galindo stood third, a result booed by the crowd, who felt that he had been undermarked. Galindo's style had been criticized as too balletic and not sufficiently "masculine," but his long program, choreographed by jazz dancer Sharlene Franke to Tchaikovsky's Swan Lake, featured eight triple jumps, including two triple-triples. Galindo's flawless execution of a program that was both masterful in its artistry and athletically demanding drew a wild standing ovation and earned him the national title. His artistic marks included two perfect scores of 6.0. Galindo thus became the first openly gay American figure skating champion. In the exhibition after the competition he wore a simple black costume with a large AIDS ribbon as he skated a moving routine to Schubert's Ave Maria as a tribute to his late brother and coaches. In January 1996, he won the men's title at the U.S. Championships at the San Jose Arena in a performance that has become legendary in the skating world. He was the oldest male to win this title in 70 years. Kestnbaum calls his programs "two inspired performances". A profile of Galindo appeared in the local newspaper, the San Jose Mercury, and he was included in a monument to San Francisco Bay area skaters dedicated during Nationals, on the basis of his success as a pairs skater. Kestnbaum reports that the national media did not notice him until he won the title, stating that he garnered more attention than skaters like Eldredge and Davis, who had more clean-cut images than Galindo. The press also reported on Galindo's "triumph-over-tragedy human interest angle" of his story, as well as the fact that he was the first Mexican American champion and the first openly-gay U.S. champion. Brennan stated that Galindo deserved the title and should have earned more points in his short program, citing it "as further evidence of the arbitrary and political nature of figure skating judging". .

Galindo went on to win a bronze medal at the 1996 World Championships. He performed to Swan Lake by Tchaikovsky for his free skate program, and Franz Biebl's Ave Maria (performed by the Stanford Fleet Street Singers) for his exhibition program. As Kestnbaum states, Galindo was not yet prepared to take on the responsibilities of being a gay role model, so he focused on his training, even though it incured disappointment and hostility from the gay community. After he won the bronze medal at World's, however, he focused on gay issues directly in his skating, including wearing a red scarf in the shape of a large AIDS ribbon around his neck during the Ave Maria program.

Galindo retired from eligible competition in the summer of 1996 and toured with Tom Collins' Champions on Ice. He underwent hip replacement surgery in August 2003 after finishing the season's tour with a broken femur on his left side. After recovering, Galindo continued to tour with COI until it went out of business in 2007. In 2006 he served as a judge on the WE tv series Skating's Next Star, created and produced by Major League Figure Skating and hosted by Kristi Yamaguchi.

Galindo coaches at Solar4America Ice (formerly Sharks Ice at San Jose), the same rink where he trained during his competitive career. Among his students is Kristi Yamaguchi's daughter, Emma Hedican.

Galindo was inducted into the San Jose Sports Hall of Fame in 2011. He was elected to the U.S. Figure Skating Hall of Fame in December 2012.

== Personal life ==
Galindo is the third child of Jess and Margaret Galindo. He had a brother, George, who was ten years older and who later died of AIDS. His sister Laura is five years older. He is of Mexican descent through his grandparents on his father's side. In 1996 he came out as gay in Christine Brennan's book Inside Edge: A Revealing Journey Into the Secret World of Figure Skating (ISBN 0-385-48607-3), which was published shortly before he won his national title that year. He is the first openly gay skating champion in the U.S. His autobiography Icebreaker (ISBN 0-671-00390-9), co-written with Eric Marcus, was published in 1997.

In 1996, after winning the bronze medal at the Worlds Championships, Galindo served as Grand Marshall at a gay pride parade in Fort Lauderdale, Florida, was the starter for a gay pride race in New York City, and appeared on the cover of Out magazine. Kestnbaum states, about Galindo: "[He] proved that the American public could embrace a gay skater as a national sports hero". Kestnbaum also reports that other skaters were inspired by Galindo, especially Doug Mattis, who had competed at the U.S. Nationals and was a professional figure skater.

Rudy was very close to his family, especially his father, who made many financial sacrifices to help his son's career. Rudy states in his autobiography, "Icebreaker" that his sister Laura often drove him to practice years before she was old enough to have a driver's license. Laura gave up her career in part to support Rudy. She acted as his coach during the 1996 championship season.

In 2000, Galindo announced he was HIV positive.

After residing a number of years in Reno, Nevada, Galindo moved back to San Jose, California in 2006.

== Competitive highlights ==
=== Singles career ===
International
Event	1981–82	1982–83	1983–84	1984–85	1985–86	1986–87	1987–88	1990–91	1991–92	1992–93	1993–94	1994–95	1995–96
Worlds													3rd
Asko/Vienna Cup							1st					1st	
Nations Cup											4th		
Prague Skate										2nd			
International: Junior
Junior Worlds				3rd	2nd	1st							
Blue Swords					2nd								
Grand Prize SNP				1st									
National
U.S. Champ.	1st N.		5th J.	3rd J.	3rd J.	8th	10th	11th	8th	5th	7th	8th	1st
Levels: N. = Novice; J. = Junior

=== Pairs career ===
(with Kristi Yamaguchi)

International
Event	1984–85	1985–86	1986–87	1987–88	1988–89	1989–90
World Champ.					5th	5th
Skate America			5th			2nd
NHK Trophy					3rd	4th
Skate Electric					1st	
International: Junior
World Junior Champ.		5th	3rd	1st		
National
U.S. Champ.	5th J.	1st J.	5th	5th	1st	1st
J. = Junior level

== Works ==
- Kestnbaum, Ellyn (2003). Culture on Ice: Figure Skating and Cultural Meaning. Middleton, Connecticut: Wesleyan Publishing Press. ISBN 0-8195-6641-1.
