= Yuriy Tsymbalyuk =

Soviet figure skater

Personal information
- Other names: Yuri Tsimbaliuk

Figure skating career
- Country: Soviet Union
- Retired: 1989
Medal record
Figure skating: Men's singles
Representing Soviet Union
World Junior Championships
Bronze medal – third place	1986 Sarajevo	Men's singles
Bronze medal – third place	1987 Kitchener	Men's singles
Bronze medal – third place	1988 Brisbane	Men's singles

Yuriy Tsymbalyuk (Ukrainian: Юрій Цимбалюк, Russian: Юрий Цымбалюк) is a former competitive figure skater for the Soviet Union. He is a three-time World Junior bronze medalist, the 1987 Karl Schäfer Memorial bronze medalist, the 1988 Prize of Moscow News silver medalist, and the 1989 Soviet national bronze medalist. His skating club was DSO Spartak in Odessa.

== Competitive highlights ==
International
Event	83–84	85–86	86–87	87–88	88–89
NHK Trophy					7th
Prize of Moscow News				9th	2nd
Schäfer Memorial				3rd	
International: Junior
World Junior Champ.		3rd	3rd	3rd	
Blue Swords			1st J		
National
Soviet Champ.	3rd J				3rd
USSR Cup	1st J				2nd
J = Junior level
