= Scott Williams (figure skater) =

American figure skater

Personal information
- Born: c. 1966 (age 59–60)

Figure skating career
- Country: United States
- Coach: Louella Rehfield; Kathy Casey

Scott Williams (born c. 1966) is an American figure skating coach and former competitor. He is the 1982 World Junior champion, 1984 Golden Spin of Zagreb champion, 1985 Skate Canada International silver medalist, and a three-time U.S. national medalist (1985 to 1987). He finished within the top ten at two World Championships.

A native of Redondo Beach, California, Williams was coached by Louella Rehfield and Kathy Casey. He retired from Olympic-eligible skating in 1988 and went on to win the men's title at the 1990 World Professional Championships. He later worked as a figure skating coach. He is best known for coaching Michelle Kwan to the 2003 U.S. and world titles. Williams currently owns and operates Ice-America and Ice-Canada Rinks, Inc., providing ice rink sales, rentals, productions, and operations management throughout North America.

== Competitive highlights ==
International
| Event | 80–81 | 81–82 | 82–83 | 83–84 | 84–85 | 85–86 | 86–87 | 87–88 |
|---|---|---|---|---|---|---|---|---|
| Worlds | | | | | | 9th | 10th | |
| Skate Canada | | | | | | 2nd | | |
| NHK Trophy | | | | | | | 6th | |
| Golden Spin | | | | | 1st | | | |
| St. Gervais | | | 2nd | | | | | |
International: Junior
| Junior Worlds | 3rd | 1st | | | | | | |
National
| U.S. Champ. | | 10th | 6th | 7th | 3rd | 2nd | 3rd | 6th |
