= Nelli Dvalishvili =

Former competitive figure skater

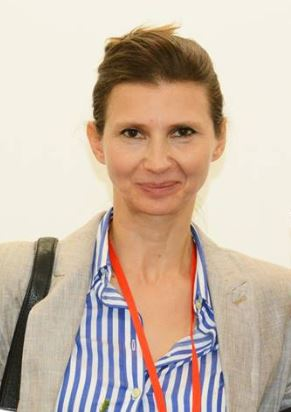

Personal information
- Full name: Nelly Goginashvili
- Born: January 16, 1968 (age 58) Georgia

Figure skating career
- Coach: Джапаридзе Ираклий Атарович

Nelli Dvalishvili (born 16 January 1968), also known as Nelly Goginashvili, is a former Soviet figure skater who competed in ladies’ singles. She placed fourth at the 1983 World Junior Figure Skating Championships in held in Sarajevo, Yugoslavia. After retiring from competitions, she became a figure skating coach and works in Israel, coaching competitive skaters at national and international events.

== Early life ==
Nelli Dvalishvili was born in 1968 in the Georgian Soviet Socialist Republic, then part of the Soviet Union. She began figure skating at an early age and trained within the Soviet sports system.

== Competitive career ==
Dvalishvili competed internationally for the Soviet Union in the early 1980s.

Her most notable result came at the 1983 World Junior Figure Skating Championships, held in Sarajevo, Yugoslavia (December 1982), where she finished fourth in ladies’ singles, narrowly missing the podium.

== Coaching in Israel ==
Nelly Goginashvili is the head coach of the Ice Dream Club in Israel, where she works with skaters of various levels and has over 30 years of coaching experience.

She has been credited as the coach of Israeli figure skaters, including Elizabeth Gervits, who finished second at the 2024 Bavarian Open in Oberstdorf and won the Senior Women’s event at the 2025 Cup of Israel Finals.
