= Skating's Next Star =

2006 US television series

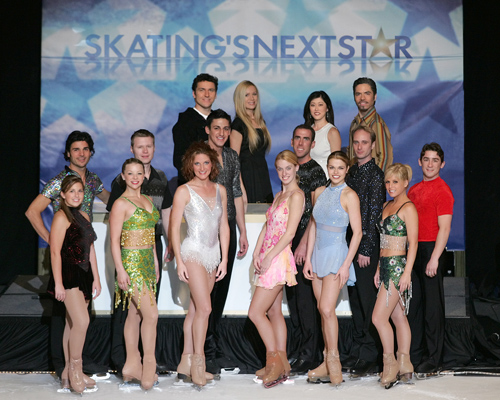
- Created by: Major League Figure Skating
- Presented by: Kristi Yamaguchi
- Judges: Elvis Stojko, Oksana Grishuk, Rudy Galindo
- Country of origin: United States
- No. of seasons: 1
- No. of episodes: 6

Production
- Production locations: Lakeland, FL
- Running time: 1 hour

Original release
- Network: WE tv
- Release: March 20 – April 24, 2006

Skating's Next Star is a reality television show that began airing on the WE tv on April 26, 2006.

== Premise ==
Twelve Professional Skaters competed for the first place prize $25,000, a feature article in International Figure Skating Magazine and a one-year contract with Major League Figure Skating. The show gained notoriety on the Today (NBC program) show which featured Natalia Kanounnikova setting the Guinness World Records for being the fastest spinner on ice. She set the record in episode 2. The Series was created by CEO of Major League Figure Skating and Former United States Figure Skating Judge, Jon Rubin.

== Cast ==
The show is hosted by Olympic Gold Medalist, Kristi Yamaguchi. The Judges are Olympic Silver Medalist Elvis Stojko, Double Olympic Gold Medalist Oksana Grishuk and World Bronze Medalist, Rudy Galindo.

=== Men skaters ===
- Sergey Meller, West Townsend, MA
- Scott Corbin, Clinton Township, MI
- Emanuele Ancorini, New York, NY
- Chris Thombs, Portsmouth, RI
- Eric Bohnstedt, Orlando, FL
- Dusty Brinsmade, Detroit, MI

=== Ladies skaters ===
- Natalia Kanounnikova, Florida
- Kristin Dority, Providence, RI
- Kristen Treni, Punta Gorda, FL
- Ashley Clark, Colorado
- Natalie Mecher, Vernon Hills, IL
- Jessica Meller, West Township, MA

== Episodes ==
No.	Title	Original release date
1	"Episode 1"	March 20, 2006
This first episode introduces the skaters. There's already a twist: the skaters will be surprised that two of them are going to be cut from the competition immediately. Each will have just 60 seconds on the ice to show their stuff in front of the judges. They'll have to show spins, footwork and jumps. In 60 seconds. No rehearsal, no practice, no second chances. Each skater skates, the judges give their critique after each skate, and at the end of the show, two skaters will be sent packing.
2	"Episode 2"	March 27, 2006
This episode has the skaters compete for fastest spin. We'll be using a custom rotational tachometer that's never been used before to precisely measure the speed of an ice skater's spin. There is a chance that one of them will earn a spot in the Guinness Book of World Records. This episode also has the skaters performing on teams in an ensemble number—swing chain, chorus line, synchronized skating, etc. The five men will be on one team and the five women on the other team. They'll have to skate together as a team, while still being in competition with one another. Each skater gets a highlighted moment, too. The judges will be briefed on how cooperative the skaters were in practice. One man and one woman will be eliminated from the competition after the team skate.
3	"Episode 3"	April 3, 2006
The skaters won't believe this challenge: they'll be judged on one jump—the nearly impossible reverse Axel. Lots of falling and very clumsy landings. We expect that one or two skaters will be able to pull it off. The skaters who do the best will earn an advantage going into this next competition... The second big challenge is all about spins. Each skater's routine will show off their best, most creative, wild, contorted, elegant spin. One man and one woman will be eliminated after the spin routines.
4	"Episode 4"	April 10, 2006
The skaters will be judged on how they skate in pairs, which most are just not trained to do. They will have rehearsal time the night before. The best pair will earn an advantage going into the second challenge... Each skater will perform an especially showy, dance number — Broadway, musicals, chorus lines, etc. One man and one woman will be eliminated after the showtime number.
5	"Episode 5"	April 17, 2006
Lots of bravura in this episode, with skaters showing off their most entertaining, fancy footwork. The best man and woman will earn an advantage going into the next challenge. The pressure's really on as each skater performs a routine with his or her biggest, finest, most crowd-pleasing jumps. One man and one woman will be eliminated after the jumps routine.
6	"Episode 6"	April 24, 2006
Kristen Treni became Skating's Next Star.

== Reception ==
In a negative review, Jessica Shaw of Entertainment Weekly wrote, "How does one butcher a reality show about figure skating? Start by assembling a lifeless host (Olympic gold medalist Kristi Yamaguchi), a petty panel of judges (including Rudy Galindo, who pathetically tries to be the Simon of the bunch but instead offers obnoxious personal criticism for no reason), a lame prize ($25,000?), and a group of contestants with lackluster moves and bland backstories."
