= Angelika Kirchmayr =

Soviet figure skater

Angelika Kirchmayr, also spelled Angelika Kirkhmaier (Russian: Анжелика Кирхмайер), is a former ice dancer from the Soviet Union and later Russia.

She is the 1989 World Junior champion with partner Dmitri Lagutin. She was married (now divorced) to Oleg Ovsyannikov, also an ice dancer, with whom she has a daughter, Michelle Kirchmayr. Kirchmayr coached Gabriela Kubová and Dmitri Kiselev.
