= Linda Florkevich =

Canadian figure skater (born 1970)

Personal information
- Full name: Linda Florkevich
- Other names: Linda Gilmour
- Born: February 3, 1970 (age 56) Kelowna, British Columbia, Canada
- Home town: Victoria, British Columbia, Canada

Figure skating career
- Country: Canada
- Skating club: North Shore WC

Linda Florkevich (married name: Gilmour) (born February 3, 1970, in Kelowna, British Columbia) is a Canadian figure skater who competed in ladies singles.

== Early life and professional career ==
Linda Florkevich was born in Kelowna, British Columbia, Canada in 1970. She started figure skating started at 4 years old.

Florkevich won gold at the Canada Winter Games (Saguenay/Lac Saint-Jean, Quebec) as a Novice in 1983. She went on to win bronze at the Junior National level in 1985 and at the Senior National level in 1987.

On an international level, Florkevich won bronze in the 1986 World Junior Figure Skating Championships.

She has skated with Canada Ice Dance Theatre.

After completing her competitive career, she began coaching young figure skaters as a National Coaching Certification Program (NCCP) Level 3 certified coach. She coaches skaters in the CanSkate programs, and at the National level.

== Competitive highlights ==
Event	1984-85	1985-86	1986-87
World Junior Championships		3rd	
Canadian Championships	3rd J.	4th	3rd
Nebelhorn Trophy		6th	
Merano Spring Trophy	2nd		

== Personal life ==
Florkevic is married to Dean Gilmour. They have two sons together. Their second son, Braiden (born 1998), was diagnosed with cerebral palsy. He was initially deemed to be unable to walk or to see, though he is now able to perform both skills He participates in running races and donates to local charities that support kids with physical disabilities and autism. His "INSPIRING POSSIBILITIES" mission has supported Variety, the Children's Charity and Victoria Riding for the Disabled Association.

The Gilmour family have hosted charity hockey challenges, social evenings and a New Year's Day Charity Ice Show.
