= Tatiana Andreeva =

Soviet figure skater

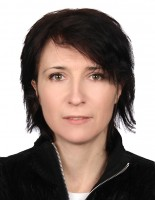

Personal information
- Full name: Tatiana Vladimirovna Andreeva (birth)
- Other names: Tatiana Vladimirovna Sharkina (married)
- Born: 13 June 1970 (age 56) Leningrad, Russian SFSR, Soviet Union

Figure skating career
- Country: Soviet Union
- Retired: 1987

Tatiana Vladimirovna Andreeva, later Sharkina (Russian: Татьяна Владимировна Андреева (Шаркина), born 13 June 1970), is a former competitive figure skater for the Soviet Union. She is the 1985 World Junior champion. She is an ISU judge in single and pair skating for Russia.

== Competitive highlights ==
International
Event	81–82	82–83	83–84	84–85	86–87	87–88
World Junior Champ.				1st		
Prize of Moscow News					6th	6th
National
Soviet Champ.	6th J	1st J	2nd J		4th	
J = Junior level
