= Erik Larson (figure skater) =

American figure skater (born c.1969)

Personal information
- Born: 1968 (age 57–58)

Figure skating career
- Country: United States
- Discipline: Men's singles
- Coach: Janet Champion; Barbara Roles; Carlo Fassi
- Skating club: San Diego FSC
Medal record
World Junior Championships
Gold medal – first place	1985 Colorado Springs	Men's singles

Erik Larson (born 1968) is an American former competitive figure skater. He is the 1985 World Junior champion and won senior international medals at the Nebelhorn Trophy, Grand Prix International St. Gervais, and Skate Electric.

== Personal life ==
Erik Larson was born in 1968 in Scottsdale, Arizona. Erik is married to a figure skating coach Roseann Crowe Larson. They have a daughter named Anabelle who is also a figure skater, born on September 9, 2005, in Ft.Lauderdale, Florida. Bella won the 2017 U.S. National Solo Dance Championships in Colorado Springs at the new World Arena and is the 2018 U.S. National Solo Dance Silver Medalist, which was held in Cape Cod, Mass. Her coaches are Marina Zoueva, Johnny Johns, Steven Belanger.

== Career ==
Larson began his skating at age five. He placed fourth at the 1984 World Junior Championships in Sapporo, Japan.

In December 1984, Larson won gold at the 1985 World Junior Championships in Colorado Springs, Colorado. He was coached by 1960 Squaw Valley Olympic bronze medalist Barbara Ann Roles Williams.

He invented the "Larson spin" in 1989 while training at The Broadmoor in Colorado Springs under Carlo Fassi and Janet Champion. That same year at the 1989 U.S. Nationals, Larson placed third in the short program and became an alternate for the World Championships. At the 1990 U.S. Olympic Festival in St. Paul Minnesota, Larson won the gold medal ahead of 1985 U.S. National Junior men's champion Doug Mattis.

He appeared as "Buttons the cellar boy" in Dorothy Hamill's Ice Capades "Cinderella Frozen in time". He also toured with Gershwin on Ice with Peggy Fleming and The Osmond Brothers tour in Las Vegas. Currently, he is the CEO for BellaICE Skating Events, a portable ice rink company, and coaches at Palm Beach Skate Zone in south Florida for the past 15 years.

== Results ==
International
Event	82–83	83–84	84–85	85–86	86–87	87–88	88–89	89–90	90–91	91–92
Nebelhorn Trophy				4th	2nd					
NHK Trophy								4th		
Skate America								6th		
Skate Electric									3rd	
St. Gervais				4th	1st					
International: Junior
Junior Worlds	7th	4th	1st							
National
U.S. Champ.	9th J	8th J	2nd J	2nd J	11th	12th	4th	4th	6th	11th
U.S. Olympic Fest.								1st		
Pacific Coast		3rd J						1st		
Southwest Pacific		2nd J	1st J							
J: Junior level
