= Elena Leonova =

Russian pair skater (born 1973)

Personal information
- Native name: Елена Рудольфовна Леонова
- Full name: Elena Rudolfovna Leonova
- Born: 12 July 1973 (age 53) Moscow, Russian SFSR, Soviet Union

Figure skating career
- Country: Russia; Soviet Union
- Partner: Andrei Khvalko, Sergey Petrovskiy, Gennadi Krasnitski
- Coach: Tatiana Tarasova, Alexander Zaitsev, Vladimir Zakharov, Elena Loboda

Elena Rudolfovna Leonova (Russian: Елена Рудольфовна Леонова; born 12 July 1973) is a Russian former pair skater. Representing the Soviet Union with Gennadi Krasnitski, she won the 1987 NHK Trophy, the 1989 Skate Canada International, and two World Junior Championships (1986, 1987).

== Personal life ==
Leonova was born on 12 July 1973 in Moscow. She married her skating partner Andrei Khvalko, with whom she has two daughters.

== Career ==
As a young child, Leonova trained under Elena Loboda. Vladimir Zakharov became her coach when she switched from singles to pairs, in 1983.

Leonova's first skating partner was Gennadi Krasnitski. The pair won gold at the 1986 World Junior Championships, held in December 1985 in Sarajevo, Yugoslavia, and successfully defended their title at the 1987 World Junior Championships, held in December 1986 in Kitchener, Ontario, Canada.

Leonova/Krasnitski won their first senior international title at the 1987 NHK Trophy. In their final season as a pair, 1989–1990, they received three gold medals — at the Skate Canada International, Nebelhorn Trophy, and Grand Prix International St. Gervais — and bronze at the Soviet Championships.

From 1990 to 1992, Leonova trained in Alexander Zaitsev's group. Skating with Sergey Petrovskiy, she placed fifth at the 1991 Skate America.

After Leonova ended her ISU competitive career, she toured with a show produced by Tatiana Tarasova. She teamed up with Andrei Khvalko in 1995. The pair competed at four World Professional Championships and won it twice, in 1999 and 2000.

She appeared twice on the ice show contest Ice Age.

== Results ==
=== With Krasnitski ===
International
Event	85–86	86–87	87–88	88–89	89–90
NHK Trophy			1st		
Skate Canada					1st
Nebelhorn Trophy					1st
St. Gervais					1st
International: Junior
World Junior Champ.	1st	1st			
National
Soviet Champ.		5th			3rd

=== With Petrovskiy ===
International
Event	1991
Skate America	5th

=== With Khvalko ===
International
Event	97–98	98–99	99–00	00–01
World Professional Championships	3rd	3rd	1st	1st
