= Natalia Skrabnevskaya =

Personal information
- Born: 1970 (age 55–56)

Figure skating career
- Country: Soviet Union
- Retired: c. 1990

Natalia Skrabnevskaya (Russian: Наталья Скрабневская, born in 1970) is a former competitive figure skater for the Soviet Union. She placed 7th at the 1990 European Championships.

== Competitive highlights ==
International
Event	85–86	86–87	87–88	88–89	89–90
European Champ.		8th			7th
Skate America				9th	
Piruetten					2nd
Prize of Moscow News			3rd	6th	
International: Junior
World Junior Champ.	6th	5th			
National
Soviet Championships		3rd			2nd
