= Artem Torgashev =

Russian figure skater (born 1969)

Personal information
- Full name: Artem Pavlovich Torgashev
- Born: January 1, 1969 (age 57)

Figure skating career
- Country: Soviet Union

Artem Pavlovich Torgashev (Russian: Артём Павлович Торгашев, born January 1, 1969) is a former pair skater who competed internationally for the Soviet Union. With partner Ekaterina Murugova, he is a two-time World Junior medalist. He has a bachelor's degree in Physical Education from the Moscow State Institute of Physical Culture. Torgashev was married to former ice dancer Ilona Melnichenko, with whom he has two children, Andrew and Deanna. Artem coaches at the Panthers Figure Skating Club, Panthers IceDen in Coral Springs, Florida. Their son, Andrew Torgashev, was born May 29, 2001, in Coral Springs, Florida, and competes for the United States in single skating.

== Results ==
(with Murugova)

Event	1985–86	1986–87	1987–88	1988–89
World Junior Championships	3rd	2nd		
Skate Canada				3rd
Nebelhorn Trophy				2nd
Blue Swords	3rd			
