= Alexandr Chichkov =

Soviet ice dancer

Alexandre Chichkov (Russian: Александр Чичков, born c. 1970) is a former competitive ice dancer who represented the Soviet Union. With Oksana Grishuk, he is the 1988 World Junior champion and 1988 Grand Prix International de Paris bronze medalist.

Chichkov started skating in Ukraine when he was six years old and relocated to Moscow, Russian SFSR at age 12. He began coaching in 1990 and joined Genesee Figure Skating Club in Rochester, New York in 2004. He settled in the United States in 1995 and became a citizen in 2002.

== With Grishuk ==
International
Event	1986–87	1987–88	1988–89
International de Paris			3rd
Prize of Moscow News			4th
International: Junior
World Junior Champ.	2nd	1st	
National: Junior
Soviet Championships		1st	
