= Ilona Melnichenko =

Soviet figure skater

Personal information
- Native name: Ілона Мельниченко
- Born: Odesa, Ukrainian SSR, Soviet Union (now Ukraine)

Figure skating career
- Country: Soviet Union
- Retired: 1991

Ilona Melnichenko (Note: Ukrainian: Ілона Мельниченко, romanized: Ilona Melnychenko) is a former ice dancer who competed for the Soviet Union. With former partner Gennady Kaskov, she is the 1987 World Junior champion and 1991 Winter Universiade champion.

She is from Odesa and has a bachelor's degree in Physical Education from the Odesa State Institute of Physical Culture. Melnichenko was married to former pair skater Artem Torgeshev, the 1987 World Junior silver medalist, with whom she has two children, Andrew and Deana. They coach at the Panthers Figure Skating Club, Saveology Iceplex in Coral Springs, Florida. Together they have coached many notable skaters, including Franchesca Chiera, Sophia Chouinard, Samantha Scott, Luiz Manella, and Andrew Torgashev. Their son, Andrew Torgashev, was born May 29, 2001, in Coral Springs, Florida, and competes for the United States in single skating.

== Results ==
(with Kaskov)

International
Event	86–87	87–88	88–89	89–90	90–91
Skate Canada				4th	
Skate America					3rd
Prize of Moscow News			3rd		
Nebelhorn Trophy		1st	1st		
Winter Universiade			2nd		1st
International: Junior
World Junior Champ.	1st				
National
Soviet Champ.					3rd
