= Natalia Gorbenko =

Ukrainian figure skater

Personal information
- Native name: Наталія Вітольдівна Горбенко
- Full name: Natalia Vitoldivna Gorbenko
- Born: 3 February 1970 (age 56) Kiev, Ukrainian SSR, Soviet Union

Figure skating career
- Country: Soviet Union; Great Britain
- Retired: 1994

Natalia Vitoldivna Gorbenko (Ukrainian: Наталія Вітольдівна Горбенко, born 3 February 1970) is a Ukrainian former competitive figure skater for the Soviet Union. After becoming the 1986 World Junior champion, she won five senior international medals and the 1989 Soviet national title. She placed as high as 5th at the European Championships and 8th at the World Championships.

After Gorbenko moved to the United Kingdom, she competed in the British Championships, placing second.

== Results ==
International
Event	84-85	85-86	86–87	87–88	88–89	89–90	90–91	91–92	92–93	93–94
Worlds				14th	8th		19th			
Europeans				6th	5th		8th			
Skate America			6th					5th		
Fujifilm Trophy				3rd						
Int. de Paris					2nd			8th		
Schäfer Memorial			1st							
Prize of Moscow				2nd	3rd					
International: Junior
Junior Worlds	3rd	1st								
National
Soviet Champ.				3rd	1st	5th	2nd	5th		
British Champ.										2nd
