= Oksana Grishuk =

Russian ice dancer (born 1972)

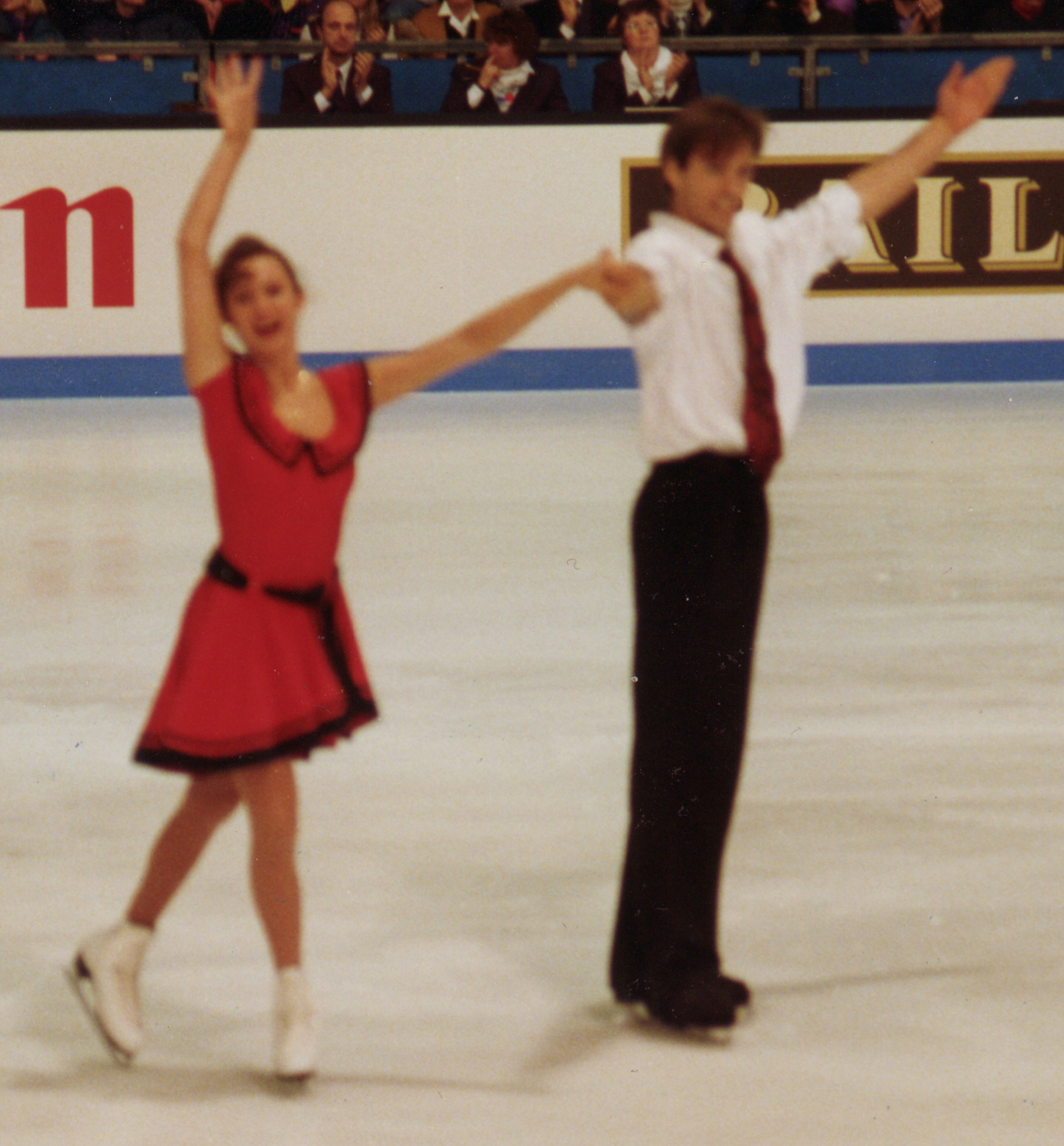
- Grishuk and Platov at the 1994 European Championships

Personal information
- Full name: Oksana Vladimirovna Grishuk
- Other names: Oksana Grishuk/Grishuk Pasha Grishuk
- Born: 17 March 1972 (age 54) Odessa, Ukrainian SSR, Soviet Union (now Odesa, Ukraine)
- Height: 1.68 m (5 ft 6 in)

Figure skating career
- Skating club: Sportsclub Dinamo
- Retired: March 1998
Medal record
Figure skating: Ice dancing
Representing Russia
Winter Olympics
| Gold medal – first place | 1998 Nagano | Ice dancing |
| Gold medal – first place | 1994 Lillehammer | Ice dancing |
World Championships
| Gold medal – first place | 1997 Lausanne | Ice dancing |
| Gold medal – first place | 1996 Edmonton | Ice dancing |
| Gold medal – first place | 1995 Birmingham | Ice dancing |
| Gold medal – first place | 1994 Chiba | Ice dancing |
| Silver medal – second place | 1993 Prague | Ice dancing |
European Championships
| Gold medal – first place | 1998 Milan | Ice dancing |
| Gold medal – first place | 1997 Paris | Ice dancing |
| Gold medal – first place | 1996 Sofia | Ice dancing |
| Silver medal – second place | 1994 Copenhagen | Ice dancing |
| Silver medal – second place | 1993 Helsinki | Ice dancing |
Grand Prix Final
| Gold medal – first place | 1997–98 Munich | Ice dancing |
| Gold medal – first place | 1995–96 Paris | Ice dancing |
Representing CIS ( Unified Team)
World Championships
| Bronze medal – third place | 1992 Oakland | Ice dancing |
European Championships
| Bronze medal – third place | 1992 Lausanne | Ice dancing |
Representing Soviet Union
World Junior Championships
| Gold medal – first place | 1988 Brisbane | Ice dancing |
| Silver medal – second place | 1987 Kitchener | Ice dancing |

Oksana (Pasha) Vladimirovna Grishuk (Russian: Оксана (Паша) Владимировна Грищук, Ukrainian: Оксана (Паша) Володимирівна Грищук; born 17 March 1972) is a Russian former competitive ice dancer. She is best known for her partnership with Evgeni Platov from 1989 to 1998. With Platov, she is a two-time Olympic champion (1994, 1998), four-time World champion (1994–1997), and three-time European champion (1996–1998). With previous partner Alexandr Chichkov, she is the 1988 World Junior champion.

== Personal life ==
Grishuk was born in Odessa (Odesa), Ukrainian SSR, Soviet Union. Her father abandoned the family before she was one. Her mother was an economic engineer. They moved to Moscow in 1980. Grishuk studied at the Sport University of Moscow from 1988 to 1992. She moved from Moscow to Newark, Delaware in 1994 and then to Marlborough, Massachusetts in 1996. She currently resides in Los Angeles, California with her daughter, Skyler Marie Grace Grishuk.

== Career ==
Grishuk began skating at the age of four. After moving to Moscow, she was turned away by several clubs before a coach finally accepted her. She began training under Natalia Linichuk at the age of 12. Grishuk initially competed with Alexandr Chichkov for the Soviet Union. In 1987, they won the silver medal at the World Junior Championships. The following year, they won gold at the event, as well as the Soviet Championships. They competed one more season and won bronze at the Grand Prix International de Paris (now known as Trophée Eric Bompard). He retired in the summer of 1989 due to injury.

Grishuk was invited to join Natalia Dubova's group where she was partnered with Evgeni Platov. They trained in Moscow. Three months later, in December 1989, they won the bronze medal at the Soviet Championships. They were fifth in their World Championship debut in 1990. Their first European and World medals, both bronze, came at the 1992 European Championships and 1992 World Championships.

Due to tensions between Grishuk and Maya Usova in the summer of 1992, Grishuk left the group. Dubova found a new partner for Platov while Grishuk briefly searched for a new partner in Germany before returning to Moscow and her previous coach, Natalia Linichuk. Platov decided not to follow Dubova and re-teamed with Grishuk in the fall of 1992.

During the 1992–93 season, Grishuk and Platov won European and World silver medals. In 1993–94, they won silver at the European Championships. They won their first Olympic title at the 1994 Olympics. They ended the season with their first World title at the 1994 World Championships. They then left Russia and moved with Linichuk to Newark, Delaware for better training and living conditions. Grishuk and Platov missed most of 1994–95 due to injury but returned to win the 1995 World Championships. They had a full season in 1995–96 and won another set of European and World titles.

In 1996, Grishuk and Platov split from Linichuk and moved to Tatiana Tarasova in Marlborough, Massachusetts. Injury kept them out of competition in the first half of the 1996–97 season but they returned to win their second European and fourth World title. In September 1997, she changed her first name to Pasha after being repeatedly confused with Oksana Baiul, but later went back to Oksana.

In 1997–98, Grishuk and Platov used Memorial Requiem by Michael Nymann for the music in their free skating program and dedicated it to the people of Sarajevo. Writer and figure skating historian Ellyn Kestnbaum called it "an intense, relentless, abstract free dance".

They won their third European Championships. At the event, they were slashed in a practice collision with Anjelika Krylova and Oleg Ovsiannikov but were not seriously hurt and both teams said it was an accident. Grishuk and Platov competed at their third Olympics in 1998 in Nagano, where they became the first ice dancers to repeat as gold medalists.

Grishuk and Platov won 20 consecutive competitions from 1994 to 1998. They were entered in the Guinness Book of World Records in 1998 for becoming the only team in the history of ice dancing to win Olympic gold twice. Grishuk and Platov combined speed and difficult elements, and displayed their mastery of numerous styles of dance. On their partnership, Platov said in 1998: "It's like being a husband and a wife. Sometimes, you fight. Sometimes, you walk away and calm down. I met her a long time ago, and I still remember her as a little girl on the ice. She was so little. So active. Usually, little girls are boring. But that girl. Oh, there was a fire on ice." He also said: "It's hard to change her mind. She fights every step. But it works out. That's why she is so good."

Grishuk and Platov retired from competition and did not compete at the 1998 World Championships. They skated together in shows until the summer of 1998. Platov then decided to skate with their former rival Maya Usova. Grishuk teamed up with Alexander Zhulin with whom she skated one year. She also appeared in Cinderella and Nutcracker shows as a solo skater and with partners.

In 1994, Russian president Boris Yeltsin awarded Grishuk with a government medal of Friendship for highest achievement in sport. In 1998, Yeltsin awarded Grishuk with a government medal of Labor also for highest achievement in sport.

In 2006, Grishuk was a celebrity judge on the WE tv series Skating's Next Star, created and produced by Major League Figure Skating and hosted by Kristi Yamaguchi. Also in 2006, Grishuk won Dance on Ice, a Russian celebrity skating show in Moscow, and was third in 2007. Grishuk and Platov reunited in February 2008 in Nagano, Japan for their ten-year anniversary of winning the 1998 Olympic gold medal. Grishuk coaches at the KHS Arena in Anaheim, California.

== Programs ==
(with Platov)

| Season | Original dance | Free dance | Exhibition |
|---|---|---|---|
| 1997–1998 | Jailhouse Rock by Elvis Presley | Memorial Requiem by Michael Nyman | Frozen by Madonna; You'll See by Madonna; Foxy Lady by The Jimi Hendrix Experience |
| 1996–1997 | Libertango by Astor Piazzolla | The Feeling Begins by Peter Gabriel | You'll See by Madonna |
| 1995–1996 | España cañí | Muchachita; Mambo Jambo (a.k.a. Que Rico El Mambo) by Pérez Prado; Bogota by Gil Ventura | I Will Always Love You by Whitney Houston |
| 1994–1995 | Girls Girls Girls | Steppin' Out | Adagio in G minor by Remo Giazotto, Tomaso Albinoni |
| 1993–1994 | Historia de um Amor | Rock Around the Clock | Swing the Mood by Jive Bunny & the Mastermixers; I Will Always Love You by Whitney Houston |
| 1992–1993 | Aquarell | St. James Infirmary Blues | Aquarell; Viennese Waltz |
| 1991–1992 | Polka | Schön Rosmarin; Liebesleid by Fritz Kreisler performed by Kryzler & Kompany | |
| 1990–1991 | Blues Blue; by K. Schneider | Tarantella; 'O sole mio; Funiculì, Funiculà | |
| 1989–1990 | Moliendo Café by Hugo Blanco | Sirtaki from Zorba the Greek by Mikis Theodorakis | |

(with Zhulin)

| Season | Programs |
|---|---|
| 1998–1999 | Un-Break My Heart by Toni Braxton; Smooth Operator by Sade; Enigma |

== Results ==
=== With Platov ===
International
| Event | 1989–90 (URS) | 1990–91 (URS) | 1991–92 (URS/CIS) | 1992–93 (RUS) | 1993–94 (RUS) | 1994–95 (RUS) | 1995–96 (RUS) | 1996–97 (RUS) | 1997–98 (RUS) |
|---|---|---|---|---|---|---|---|---|---|
| Olympics | | | 4th | | 1st | | | | 1st |
| Worlds | 5th | 4th | 3rd | 2nd | 1st | 1st | 1st | 1st | |
| Europeans | 5th | 5th | 3rd | 2nd | 2nd | | 1st | 1st | 1st |
| CS (GP) Final | | | | | | | 1st | | 1st |
| GP TDF / Lalique | | | | | | | 1st | | 1st |
| GP NHK Trophy | 2nd | | 2nd | | 1st | | | | 1st |
| GP Skate America | | | | | | | 1st | | |
| Centennial On Ice | | | | | | | 1st | | |
National
| Russian Champ. | | | | | | | 1st | | |
| Soviet Champ. | 3rd | 2nd | 1st | | | | | | |
GP = Champions Series (Grand Prix)

=== With Chichkov ===
International
| Event | 1986–87 | 1987–88 | 1988–89 |
|---|---|---|---|
| International de Paris | | | 3rd |
| Prize of Moscow News | | | 4th |
International: Junior
| World Junior Champ. | 2nd | 1st | |
National: Junior
| Soviet Championships | | 1st | |
