= Cornelia Renner =

German figure skater

Figure skating career
- Country: West Germany

Cornelia Renner is a former competitive figure skater who represented West Germany. She won gold at the 1984 Prague Skate, bronze at the 1986 Fujifilm Trophy, silver at the 1986 Nebelhorn Trophy, and bronze at the 1986 Grand Prix International St. Gervais.

== Competitive highlights ==
International
Event	1984–85	1985–86	1986–87
Fujifilm Trophy			3rd
Nebelhorn Trophy			2nd
Prague Skate	1st		
St. Gervais			3rd
Merano Spring Trophy		3rd	
National
West German Champ.			3rd
