= Irina Mironenko =

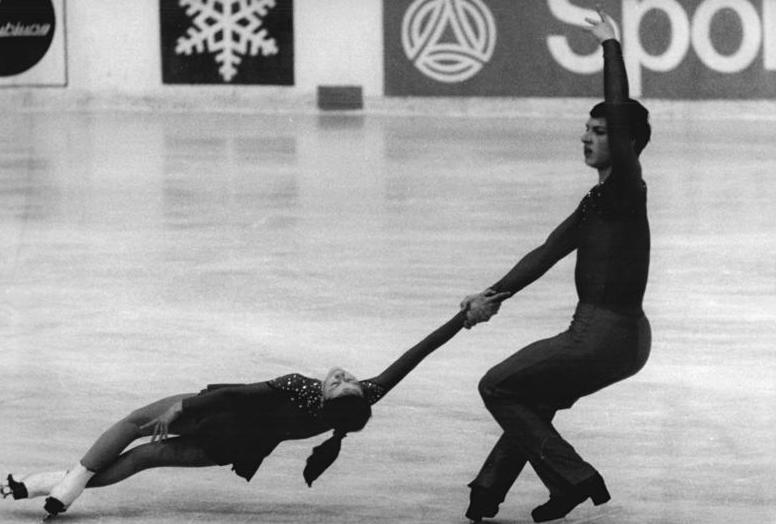
- Mironenko and Shkidchenko in 1984.

Figure skating career
- Country: Soviet Union
- Retired: 1987

Irina Mironenko (Russian: Ирина Мироненко) is a former pair skater who competed internationally for the Soviet Union. With partner Dmitri Shkidchenko, she is the 1985 and 1986 World Junior silver medalist.

== Results ==
(with Shkidchenko)

Event	1984–85	1985–86	1986–87
World Junior Championships	2nd	2nd	
Blue Swords	1st		
St. Ivel International			5th
