= Marc Ferland (figure skater) =

Canadian figure skater

Figure skating career
- Country: Canada
- Skating club: Beauport FSC
Medal record
Figure skating: Men's singles
Representing Canada
World Junior Championships
Silver medal – second place	1984 Sapporo	Men's singles

Marc Ferland is a Canadian former competitive figure skater. He is the 1984 World Junior silver medalist. He retired from competition in the 1980s and later started a singing career. He sang the Canadian national anthem during the opening ceremony at the 2007 Skate Canada International and the finale "This is the Moment" during the figure skating exhibition gala at the 2010 Winter Olympics in Vancouver, British Columbia, Canada.

== Competitive highlights ==
International
Event	82–83	83–84	84–85	85–86
Skate America				9th
Nebelhorn Trophy			5th	
International: Junior
World Junior Champ.	4th	2nd		
National
Canadian Champ.	3rd J	2nd J	6th	
J = Junior
