= Anna Croci =

Italian ice dancer (born 1972)

Personal information
- Nationality: Italian
- Born: 23 June 1972 (age 53) Milan, Italy

Sport
- Sport: Figure skating

Anna Croci (born 23 June 1972) is an Italian former ice dancer. She competed in the ice dance event at the 1992 Winter Olympics with Luca Mantovani.

== Competitive highlights ==
With Mantovani

International
Event	84–85	85–86	86–87	87–88	88–89	89–90	90–91	91–92
Olympics								13th
Worlds					15th	14th	15th	13th
Europeans					13th	8th		11th
Inter. de Paris								6th
Lysiane Lauret								3rd
Nations Cup							3rd	
Skate America						9th		8th
Skate Canada							4th	
St. Gervais				1st				
International: Junior
Junior Worlds	12th	8th	4th					
Autumn Trophy		2nd						
