= Zhang Bo (figure skater) =

Chinese former competitive figure skater

Zhang Bo is a Chinese former competitive figure skater. She is a two-time Winter Universiade bronze medalist (1991, 1993).

She competed at three World Junior Championships in the 1980s, placing 13th at the 1988 edition in Brisbane, Australia. As a senior, she represented China at the 1993 World Championships in Prague, Czech Republic; she qualified to the final segment and finished 16th overall.

== Competitive highlights ==
International
Event	85–86	86–87	87–88	88–89	89–90	90–91	91–92	92–93	93–94
Worlds								16th	
NHK Trophy				7th		13th			9th
Universiade						3rd		3rd	
International: Junior
Junior Worlds	20th	22nd	13th						
