= Ekaterina Murugova =

Soviet pair skater (born 1973)

Personal information
- Full name: Ekaterina Viktorovna Murugova
- Born: 1973 (age 52–53)

Figure skating career
- Country: Soviet Union

Ekaterina Viktorovna Murugova (Russian: Екатерина Викторовна Муругова, born 1973) is a former pair skater who competed internationally for the Soviet Union. With partner Artem Torgashev, she is a two-time World Junior medalist. Murugova joined the Russian Ice Stars company.

== Results ==
(with Torgashev)

Event	1985–86	1986–87	1987–88	1988–89
World Junior Championships	3rd	2nd		
Skate Canada				3rd
Nebelhorn Trophy				2nd
Blue Swords	3rd			
