= Vladimir Petrenko =

Ukrainian figure skater (born 1971)

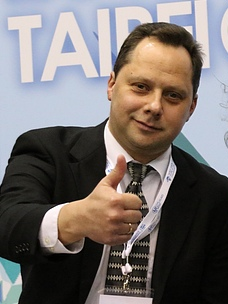
- Petrenko at the 2017 World Junior Championships

Personal information
- Full name: Vladimir Vasilyevich Petrenko
- Other names: Volodymyr Petrenko
- Born: 1971 (age 54–55) Odesa, Ukrainian SSR, Soviet Union (now Ukraine)

Figure skating career
- Country: Soviet Union
- Retired: 1992; now works at ISCC
Medal record
Figure skating: Men's singles
Representing Soviet Union
World Junior Championships
Gold medal – first place	1986 Sarajevo	Men's singles
Silver medal – second place	1985 Colorado Springs	Men's singles

Vladimir Vasilyevich Petrenko (Note: Ukrainian: Володимир Васильович Петренко, romanized: Volodymyr Vasylovych Petrenko; Russian: Владимир Васильевич Петренко, romanized: Vladimir Vasilyevich Petrenko) (born in 1971) is a former competitive figure skater who represented the Soviet Union. He is the 1986 World Junior champion. He is the younger brother of Olympic gold medalist Viktor Petrenko, and they were both coached by Ukrainian figure skating coach Galina Zmievskaya at Spartak in Odesa.

Petrenko currently works as a coach at the International Skating Center (ISCC) in Simsbury, Connecticut. He is an ISU technical specialist for Ukraine. He has two sons, Daniel and Anton Petrenko. Daniel was once a competitive figure skater.

== Competitive highlights ==
International
Event	83–84	84–85	85–86	86–87	87–88	88–89	89–90	90–91	91–92
Worlds					10th				
Fujifilm Trophy					2nd				
Moscow News				3rd	3rd	1st			
Nebelhorn Trophy								3rd	3rd
Skate America						5th			
Skate Electric							3rd		
Universiade						3rd			
International: Junior
Junior Worlds	5th	2nd	1st						
National
Soviet Champ.				4th	4th				
