= Charles Paliard =

French ice dancer

Personal information
- Full name: Charles-Henri Paliard
- Born: 26 April 1968 (age 58)

Figure skating career
- Country: France

Charles-Henri Paliard (born 26 April 1968) is a French former ice dancer. With Doriane Bontemps, he won bronze at the 1985 World Junior Championships, after placing sixth a year earlier. They won two senior international medals — bronze at the 1985 Nebelhorn Trophy and silver at the 1985 Grand Prix International St. Gervais.
