= Susanne Becher =

German figure skater

Figure skating career
- Country: West Germany

Susanne Becher is a German former competitive figure skater. As a single skater, she is a three-time World Junior silver medalist, a two-time German national medalist, and finished as high as 5th at the European Championships, in 1987. She also briefly competed in pair skating with Stefan Pfrengle.

== Results ==
=== Single skating ===
International
Event	1983–84	1984–85	1985–86	1986–87
World Championships			15th	12th
European Champ.			10th	5th
Prague Skate	10th			1st
International: Junior
World Junior Champ.		2nd	2nd	2nd
National
West German Champ.			3rd	2nd

=== Pairs with Pfrengle ===
National
Event	1984
German Championships	2nd
