= Doriane Bontemps =

French ice dancer

Personal information
- Born: 19 February 1967 (age 59)

Figure skating career
- Country: France

Doriane Bontemps (born 19 February 1967) is a French former ice dancer. With Charles Paliard, she won bronze at the 1985 World Junior Championships, after placing sixth a year earlier. They won two senior international medals — bronze at the 1985 Nebelhorn Trophy and silver at the 1985 Grand Prix International St. Gervais. In the 1987–88 season, Bontemps competed with Albérick Dallongeville.
