= Elena Krykanova =

Soviet figure skater

Elena Krykanova, also romanized as Krikanova, (Russian: Елена Крыканова) is a former ice dancer who represented the Soviet Union. With former partner Evgeni Platov, she is a three-time World Junior champion (1984–1986). They began skating together around December 1976 in Odessa, and were coached by Boris Rublev until 1982, when they moved to Moscow to train under Natalia Dubova.

In January 1990, she defected to the United States along with Gorsha Sur, Igor Shpilband, and Veronica Pershina.

== Results ==
(with Platov)

Event	1983–84	1984–85	1985–86
World Junior Championship	1st	1st	1st
