= World Junior Figure Skating Championships =

World championship

- Status: Active
- Genre: International championship event
- Frequency: Annual
- Inaugurated: 1976
- Previous event: 2026 World Junior Championships
- Next event: 2027 World Junior Championships
- Organizer: International Skating Union

The World Junior Figure Skating Championships are an annual figure skating competition sanctioned by the International Skating Union (ISU). The first World Junior Championships were held in 1976 in Megève, France, and the competition has been held every year since, except for 2021, when the event was cancelled due to the COVID-19 pandemic. Skaters are eligible to compete at the World Junior Championships, provided they represent a member nation of the ISU and are selected by their respective federation, if they are at least 13 years old before July 1 of the respective season, but not yet 19 (for single skaters), 21 (for men and women in ice dance and women in pair skating), or 23 (for men in pair skating). Medals are awarded in men's singles, women's singles, pair skating, and ice dance. The corresponding competition for senior-level skaters is the World Figure Skating Championships.

Rio Nakata of Japan and Adam Rippon of the United States are currently tied for winning the most World Junior Championship titles in men's singles (with two each), while Mao Shimada of Japan holds the record in women's singles (with four). Natalia Krestianinova and Alexei Torchinski of the Soviet Union are tied with Sui Wenjing and Han Cong of China for winning the most titles in pair skating (with three each), while Luka Berulava of Georgia also won three World Junior Championship titles in pair skating, but with different partners. Elena Krykanova and Evgeni Platov of the Soviet Union hold the record in ice dance (with three).

== History ==
The International Skating Union (ISU) adopted legislation in 1975 establishing the Junior Figure Skating Championships. The championships were established on a two-year trial basis with the understanding that if they were successful, they would be renamed the World Junior Figure Skating Championships. The inaugural World Junior Championships took place in Megève, France, in 1976. No skaters were permitted to compete who had previously competed at the European Championships, World Championships, or the Winter Olympics, nor could they have previously won a medal at any international senior-level competition. Those prohibitions were removed in 1980. Mark Cockerell and Suzie Brasher of the United States won the inaugural men's and women's event, respectively. Sherri Baier and Robin Cowan of Canada won the inaugural pairs event, and Kathryn Winter and Nicholas Slater of Great Britain won the inaugural ice dance event.

Controversy arose at the 1977 World Junior Championships when South Africa entered skaters in the competition. The Soviet Union filed a written protest with the ISU demanding that South African skaters be barred from competing in response to South Africa's apartheid policies. When the ISU refused, the Soviet Union and members of the Warsaw Pact (Bulgaria, Czechoslovakia, East Germany, Hungary, Poland, and Romania) boycotted the competition. In response, the ISU placed a "temporary restriction of not taking part in ISU championships" on skaters from South Africa, although South Africa was not expelled from the ISU.

The competition was elevated to World status beginning in 1978 and the first official World Junior Championships were again held in Megève. They were held without interruption until 2021. The 2021 World Junior Championships were originally scheduled to be held in Harbin, China; however, the ISU announced the cancellation of the event on November 24, 2020, citing "the pandemic developments and related impact on the organizers and participants." The World Junior Championships were the second ISU Championship event to be cancelled during the 2020–21 season, following the cancellation of the 2021 Four Continents Championships on October 16. The 2020–21 ISU Junior Grand Prix series had also been cancelled earlier in the season, on July 20. With the cancellation of the World Junior Championships, there was effectively no opportunity for junior-level skaters to compete during the 2020–21 season.

== Qualifying ==
Skaters may compete at the World Junior Championships if they represent a member nation of the International Skating Union (ISU) and are selected by their federation. Member nations select their entries according to their own criteria. Some countries rely on the results of their national championships while others have more varied criteria, which may include success at certain international events or specific technical requirements. All of the selected skaters must have earned the minimum total element scores, which are determined and published each season by the ISU during the current or immediately previous season. Member nations may enter at least one competitor or team in each discipline; a points system allows member nations to enter additional competitors or teams, up to a total of three per discipline, based on the nation's performance in that discipline at the previous World Junior Championships.

Skaters are eligible to compete on the junior-level circuit if they are at least 13 years old before July 1 of the respective season, and if they have not yet turned 19 (for single skaters), 21 (for males and females in ice dance, and females in pair skating) or 23 (for males in pair skating).

== Medalists ==
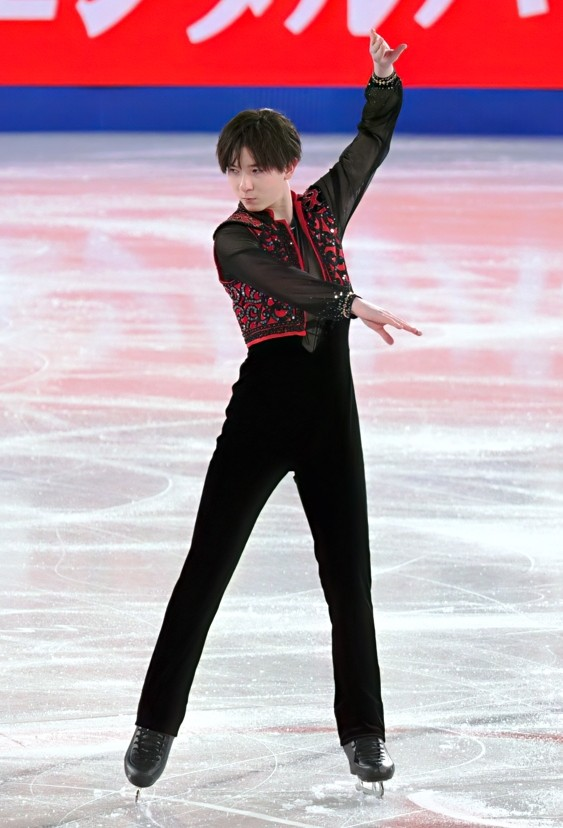
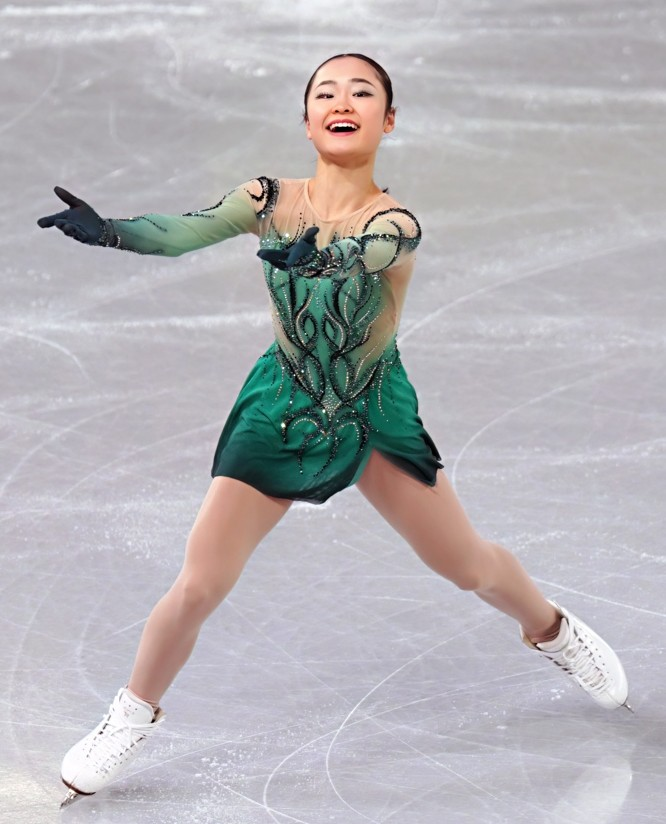
The reigning World Junior champions: Rio Nakata of Japan (men's singles) and Mao Shimada of Japan (women's singles)
Not pictured: Ava Kemp and Yohnatan Elizarov of Canada (pair skating), and Hana Maria Aboian and Daniil Veselukhin of the United States (ice dance)

=== Men's singles ===
Men's event medalists
Year	Location	Gold	Silver	Bronze	Ref.
1976	(France) Megève	(United States) Mark Cockerell	(Japan) Takashi Mura	(Canada) Brian Pockar	
1977	(France) Megève	(Canada) Daniel Beland	(United Kingdom) Mark Pepperday	(Switzerland) Richard Furrer	
1978	(France) Megève	(Canada) Dennis Coi	(Soviet Union) Vladimir Kotin	(United States) Brian Boitano	
1979	(West Germany) Augsburg	(Soviet Union) Vitali Egorov	(United States) Bobby Beauchamp	(Soviet Union) Alexandre Fadeev	
1980	(France) Megève	(Soviet Union) Alexandre Fadeev	(Soviet Union) Vitali Egorov	(East Germany) Falko Kirsten	
1981	(Canada) London	(United States) Paul Wylie	(Soviet Union) Yuri Bureiko	(United States) Scott Williams	
1982	(West Germany) Oberstdorf	(United States) Scott Williams	(United States) Paul Guerrero	(East Germany) Alexander König	
1983	(Socialist Federal Republic of Yugoslavia) Sarajevo	(United States) Christopher Bowman	(France) Philippe Roncoli	(East Germany) Nils Köpp	
1984	(Japan) Sapporo	(Soviet Union) Viktor Petrenko	(Canada) Marc Ferland	(United States) Tom Cierniak	
1985	(United States) Colorado Springs	(United States) Erik Larson	(Soviet Union) Vladimir Petrenko	(United States) Rudy Galindo	
1986	(Socialist Federal Republic of Yugoslavia) Sarajevo	(Soviet Union) Vladimir Petrenko	(United States) Rudy Galindo	(Soviet Union) Yuriy Tsymbalyuk	
1987	(Canada) Kitchener	(United States) Rudy Galindo	(United States) Todd Eldredge	(Soviet Union) Yuriy Tsymbalyuk	
1988	(Australia) Brisbane	(United States) Todd Eldredge	(Soviet Union) Vyacheslav Zahorodnyuk	(Soviet Union) Yuriy Tsymbalyuk	
1989	(Socialist Federal Republic of Yugoslavia) Sarajevo	(Soviet Union) Vyacheslav Zahorodnyuk	(United States) Shepherd Clark	(Japan) Masakazu Kagiyama	
1990	(United States) Colorado Springs	(Soviet Union) Igor Pashkevich	(Soviet Union) Alexei Urmanov	(United States) John Baldwin	
1991	(Hungary) Budapest	(Soviet Union) Vasili Eremenko	(Soviet Union) Alexander Abt	(France) Nicolas Pétorin	
1992	(Canada) Hull	(Soviet Union) Dmytro Dmytrenko	(Soviet Union) Konstantin Kostin	(United States) Damon Allen	
1993	(South Korea) Seoul	(Ukraine) Evgeni Pliuta	(United States) Michael Weiss	(Russia) Ilia Kulik	
1994	(United States) Colorado Springs	(United States) Michael Weiss	(Japan) Naoki Shigematsu	(United States) Jere Michael	
1995	(Hungary) Budapest	(Russia) Ilia Kulik	(France) Thierry Cerez	(Japan) Seiichi Suzuki	
1996	(Australia) Brisbane	(Russia) Alexei Yagudin	(Japan) Takeshi Honda	(China) Guo Zhengxin	
1997	(South Korea) Seoul	(Russia) Evgeni Plushenko	(United States) Timothy Goebel	(China) Guo Zhengxin	
1998	(Canada) Saint John	(United States) Derrick Delmore	(Russia) Sergei Davydov	(China) Li Yunfei	
1999	(Croatia) Zagreb	(Russia) Ilia Klimkin	(France) Vincent Restencourt	(Japan) Yosuke Takeuchi	
2000	(Germany) Oberstdorf	(Germany) Stefan Lindemann	(France) Vincent Restencourt	(United States) Matthew Savoie	
2001	(Bulgaria) Sofia	(United States) Johnny Weir	(United States) Evan Lysacek	(France) Vincent Restencourt	
2002	(Norway) Hamar	(Japan) Daisuke Takahashi	(Belgium) Kevin van der Perren	(Russia) Stanislav Timchenko	
2003	(Czech Republic) Ostrava	(Russia) Alexander Shubin	(United States) Evan Lysacek	(France) Alban Préaubert	
2004	(Netherlands) The Hague	(Russia) Andrei Griazev	(United States) Evan Lysacek	(United States) Jordan Brauninger	
2005	(Canada) Kitchener	(Japan) Nobunari Oda	(France) Yannick Ponsero	(Russia) Sergei Dobrin	
2006	(Slovenia) Ljubljana	(Japan) Takahiko Kozuka	(Russia) Sergei Voronov	(France) Yannick Ponsero	
2007	(Germany) Oberstdorf	(United States) Stephen Carriere	(Canada) Patrick Chan	(Russia) Sergei Voronov	
2008	(Bulgaria) Sofia	(United States) Adam Rippon	(Russia) Artem Borodulin	(China) Guan Jinlin	
2009	(Bulgaria) Sofia	(United States) Adam Rippon	(Czech Republic) Michal Březina	(Russia) Artem Grigoriev	
2010	(Netherlands) The Hague	(Japan) Yuzuru Hanyu	(China) Song Nan	(Russia) Artur Gachinski	
2011	(South Korea) Gangneung	(Canada) Andrei Rogozine	(Japan) Keiji Tanaka	(Sweden) Alexander Majorov	
2012	(Belarus) Minsk	(China) Yan Han	(United States) Joshua Farris	(United States) Jason Brown	
2013	(Italy) Milan	(United States) Joshua Farris	(United States) Jason Brown	(United States) Shotaro Omori	
2014	(Bulgaria) Sofia	(Canada) Nam Nguyen	(Russia) Adian Pitkeev	(United States) Nathan Chen	
2015	(Estonia) Tallinn	(Japan) Shoma Uno	(China) Jin Boyang	(Japan) Sōta Yamamoto	
2016	(Hungary) Debrecen	(Israel) Daniel Samohin	(Canada) Nicolas Nadeau	(United States) Tomoki Hiwatashi	
2017	(Taiwan) Taipei City	(United States) Vincent Zhou	(Russia) Dmitri Aliev	(Russia) Alexander Samarin	
2018	(Bulgaria) Sofia	(Russia) Alexey Erokhov	(Russia) Artur Danielian	(Italy) Matteo Rizzo	
2019	(Croatia) Zagreb	(United States) Tomoki Hiwatashi	(Russia) Roman Savosin	(Italy) Daniel Grassl	
2020	(Estonia) Tallinn	(Russia) Andrei Mozalev	(Japan) Yuma Kagiyama	(Russia) Petr Gumennik	
2021	(China) Harbin	Competition cancelled due to the COVID-19 pandemic			
2022	(Estonia) Tallinn	(United States) Ilia Malinin	(Kazakhstan) Mikhail Shaidorov	(Japan) Tatsuya Tsuboi	
2023	(Canada) Calgary	(Japan) Kao Miura	(Switzerland) Naoki Rossi	(Japan) Nozomu Yoshioka	
2024	(Taiwan) Taipei City	(South Korea) Seo Min-kyu	(Japan) Rio Nakata	(Slovakia) Adam Hagara	
2025	(Hungary) Debrecen	(Japan) Rio Nakata	(South Korea) Seo Min-kyu	(Slovakia) Adam Hagara	
2026	(Estonia) Tallinn	(Japan) Rio Nakata	(South Korea) Seo Min-kyu	(Japan) Taiga Nishino	

=== Women's singles ===
Women's event medalists
Year	Location	Gold	Silver	Bronze	Ref.
1976	(France) Megève	(United States) Suzie Brasher	(West Germany) Garnet Ostermeier	(United Kingdom) Tracey Solomons	
1977	(France) Megève	(Canada) Carolyn Skoczen	(Austria) Christa Jorda	(Switzerland) Corine Wyrsch	
1978	(France) Megève	(United States) Jill Sawyer	(Soviet Union) Kira Ivanova	(West Germany) Petra Ernert	
1979	(West Germany) Augsburg	(United States) Elaine Zayak	(West Germany) Manuela Ruben	(United States) Jacki Farrell	
1980	(France) Megève	(United States) Rosalynn Sumners	(Canada) Kay Thomson	(East Germany) Carola Paul	
1981	(Canada) London	(United States) Tiffany Chin	(Soviet Union) Marina Serova	(Soviet Union) Anna Antonova	
1982	(West Germany) Oberstdorf	(East Germany) Janina Wirth	(East Germany) Cornelia Tesch	(Canada) Elizabeth Manley	
1983	(Socialist Federal Republic of Yugoslavia) Sarajevo	(East Germany) Simone Koch	(East Germany) Karin Hendschke	(Austria) Parthena Sarafidis	
1984	(Japan) Sapporo	(East Germany) Karin Hendschke	(East Germany) Simone Koch	(Japan) Midori Ito	
1985	(United States) Colorado Springs	(Soviet Union) Tatiana Andreeva	(West Germany) Susanne Becher	(Soviet Union) Natalia Gorbenko	
1986	(Socialist Federal Republic of Yugoslavia) Sarajevo	(Soviet Union) Natalia Gorbenko	(West Germany) Susanne Becher	(Canada) Linda Florkevich	
1987	(Canada) Kitchener	(United States) Cindy Bortz	(West Germany) Susanne Becher	(Canada) Shannon Allison	
1988	(Australia) Brisbane	(United States) Kristi Yamaguchi	(Japan) Junko Yaginuma	(Japan) Yukiko Kashihara	
1989	(Socialist Federal Republic of Yugoslavia) Sarajevo	(United States) Jessica Mills	(Japan) Junko Yaginuma	(France) Surya Bonaly	
1990	(United States) Colorado Springs	(Japan) Yuka Sato	(France) Surya Bonaly	(East Germany) Tanja Krienke	
1991	(Hungary) Budapest	(France) Surya Bonaly	(United States) Lisa Ervin	(China) Chen Lu	
1992	(Canada) Hull	(France) Laëtitia Hubert	(United States) Lisa Ervin	(China) Chen Lu	
1993	(South Korea) Seoul	(Japan) Kumiko Koiwai	(United States) Lisa Ervin	(Germany) Tanja Szewczenko	
1994	(United States) Colorado Springs	(United States) Michelle Kwan	(Hungary) Krisztina Czakó	(Russia) Irina Slutskaya	
1995	(Hungary) Budapest	(Russia) Irina Slutskaya	(Russia) Elena Ivanova	(Hungary) Krisztina Czakó	
1996	(Australia) Brisbane	(Russia) Elena Ivanova	(Russia) Elena Pingacheva	(Russia) Nadezhda Kanaeva	
1997	(South Korea) Seoul	(United States) Sydne Vogel	(Russia) Elena Sokolova	(Russia) Elena Ivanova	
1998	(Canada) Saint John	(Russia) Julia Soldatova	(Russia) Elena Ivanova	(Russia) Viktoria Volchkova	
1999	(Croatia) Zagreb	(Russia) Daria Timoshenko	(United States) Sarah Hughes	(Russia) Viktoria Volchkova	
2000	(Germany) Oberstdorf	(United States) Jennifer Kirk	(United States) Deanna Stellato	(Switzerland) Sarah Meier	
2001	(Bulgaria) Sofia	(Russia) Kristina Oblasova	(United States) Ann Patrice McDonough	(Finland) Susanna Pöykiö	
2002	(Norway) Hamar	(United States) Ann Patrice McDonough	(Japan) Yukari Nakano	(Japan) Miki Ando	
2003	(Czech Republic) Ostrava	(Japan) Yukina Ota	(Japan) Miki Ando	(Italy) Carolina Kostner	
2004	(Netherlands) The Hague	(Japan) Miki Ando	(United States) Kimmie Meissner	(United States) Katy Taylor	
2005	(Canada) Kitchener	(Japan) Mao Asada	(South Korea) Yuna Kim	(United States) Emily Hughes	
2006	(Slovenia) Ljubljana	(South Korea) Yuna Kim	(Japan) Mao Asada	(United States) Christine Zukowski	
2007	(Germany) Oberstdorf	(United States) Caroline Zhang	(United States) Mirai Nagasu	(United States) Ashley Wagner	
2008	(Bulgaria) Sofia	(United States) Rachael Flatt	(United States) Caroline Zhang	(United States) Mirai Nagasu	
2009	(Bulgaria) Sofia	(Russia) Alena Leonova	(United States) Caroline Zhang	(United States) Ashley Wagner	
2010	(Netherlands) The Hague	(Japan) Kanako Murakami	(United States) Agnes Zawadzki	(Russia) Polina Agafonova	
2011	(South Korea) Gangneung	(Russia) Adelina Sotnikova	(Russia) Elizaveta Tuktamysheva	(United States) Agnes Zawadzki	
2012	(Belarus) Minsk	(Russia) Yulia Lipnitskaya	(United States) Gracie Gold	(Russia) Adelina Sotnikova	
2013	(Italy) Milan	(Russia) Elena Radionova	(Russia) Yulia Lipnitskaya	(Russia) Anna Pogorilaya	
2014	(Bulgaria) Sofia	(Russia) Elena Radionova	(Russia) Serafima Sakhanovich	(Russia) Evgenia Medvedeva	
2015	(Estonia) Tallinn	(Russia) Evgenia Medvedeva	(Russia) Serafima Sakhanovich	(Japan) Wakaba Higuchi	
2016	(Hungary) Debrecen	(Japan) Marin Honda	(Russia) Maria Sotskova	(Japan) Wakaba Higuchi	
2017	(Taiwan) Taipei City	(Russia) Alina Zagitova	(Japan) Marin Honda	(Japan) Kaori Sakamoto	
2018	(Bulgaria) Sofia	(Russia) Alexandra Trusova	(Russia) Alena Kostornaia	(Japan) Mako Yamashita	
2019	(Croatia) Zagreb	(Russia) Alexandra Trusova	(Russia) Anna Shcherbakova	(United States) Ting Cui	
2020	(Estonia) Tallinn	(Russia) Kamila Valieva	(Russia) Daria Usacheva	(United States) Alysa Liu	
2021	(China) Harbin	Competition cancelled due to the COVID-19 pandemic			
2022	(Estonia) Tallinn	(United States) Isabeau Levito	(South Korea) Shin Ji-a	(United States) Lindsay Thorngren	
2023	(Canada) Calgary	(Japan) Mao Shimada	(South Korea) Shin Ji-a	(Japan) Ami Nakai	
2024	(Taiwan) Taipei City	(Japan) Mao Shimada	(South Korea) Shin Ji-a	(Japan) Rena Uezono	
2025	(Hungary) Debrecen	(Japan) Mao Shimada	(South Korea) Shin Ji-a	(United States) Elyce Lin-Gracey	
2026	(Estonia) Tallinn	(Japan) Mao Shimada	(Australia) Hana Bath	(Japan) Mayuko Oka	

=== Pairs ===
Pairs event medalists
Year	Location	Gold	Silver	Bronze	Ref.
1976	(France) Megève	(Canada); Sherri Baier; Robin Cowan	(United States); Lorene Mitchell; Donald Mitchell	(Australia); Elizabeth Cain; Peter Cain	
1977	(France) Megève	(Canada); Josée France; Paul Mills	(South Africa); Elga Balk; Gavin MacPherson	No other competitors	
1978	(France) Megève	(Canada); Barbara Underhill; Paul Martini	(Czechoslovakia); Jana Bláhová; Luděk Feňo	(United States); Beth Flora; Ken Flora	
1979	(West Germany) Augsburg	(Soviet Union); Veronika Pershina; Marat Akbarov	(Soviet Union); Larisa Selezneva; Oleg Makarov	(Canada); Lori Baier; Lloyd Eisler	
1980	(France) Megève	(Soviet Union); Larisa Selezneva; Oleg Makarov	(Soviet Union); Marina Nikitiuk; Rashid Kadyrkaev	(France); Kathia Dubec; Xavier Douillard	
1981	(Canada) London	(Soviet Union); Larisa Selezneva; Oleg Makarov	(Canada); Lori Baier; Lloyd Eisler	(Soviet Union); Marina Nikitiuk; Rashid Kadyrkaev	
1982	(West Germany) Oberstdorf	(Soviet Union); Marina Avstriyskaya; Yuri Kvashnin	(Soviet Union); Inna Bekker; Serguei Likhanski	(East Germany); Babette Preußler; Torsten Ohlow	
1983	(Socialist Federal Republic of Yugoslavia) Sarajevo	(Soviet Union); Marina Avstriyskaya; Yuri Kvashnin	(East Germany); Peggy Seidel; Ralf Seifert	(Soviet Union); Inna Bekker; Serguei Likhanski	
1984	(Japan) Sapporo	(East Germany); Manuela Landgraf; Ingo Steuer	(United States); Susan Dungjen; Jason Dungjen	(Soviet Union); Olga Neizvestnaya; Sergei Khudiakov	
1985	(United States) Colorado Springs	(Soviet Union); Ekaterina Gordeeva; Sergei Grinkov	(Soviet Union); Irina Mironenko; Dmitri Shkidchenko	(Soviet Union); Elena Gud; Evgeni Koltun	
1986	(Socialist Federal Republic of Yugoslavia) Sarajevo	(Soviet Union); Elena Leonova; Gennadi Krasnitski	(Soviet Union); Irina Mironenko; Dmitri Shkidchenko	(Soviet Union); Ekaterina Murugova; Artem Torgashev	
1987	(Canada) Kitchener	(Soviet Union); Elena Leonova; Gennadi Krasnitski	(Soviet Union); Ekaterina Murugova; Artem Torgashev	(United States); Kristi Yamaguchi; Rudy Galindo	
1988	(Australia) Brisbane	(United States); Kristi Yamaguchi; Rudy Galindo	(Soviet Union); Evgenia Chernyshyova; Dmitri Sukhanov	(Soviet Union); Yulia Liashenko; Andrei Bushkov	
1989	(Socialist Federal Republic of Yugoslavia) Sarajevo	(Soviet Union); Evgenia Chernyshyova; Dmitri Sukhanov	(East Germany); Angela Caspari; Marno Kreft	(Soviet Union); Irina Saifutdinova; Alexei Tikhonov	
1990	(United States) Colorado Springs	(Soviet Union); Natalia Krestianinova; Alexei Torchinski	(Soviet Union); Svitlana Prystav; Viacheslav Tkachenko	(United States); Jennifer Heurlin; John Frederiksen	
1991	(Hungary) Budapest	(Soviet Union); Natalia Krestianinova; Alexei Torchinski	(Soviet Union); Svitlana Prystav; Viacheslav Tkachenko	(United States); Jennifer Heurlin; John Frederiksen	
1992	(Canada) Hull	(Soviet Union); Natalia Krestianinova; Alexei Torchinski	(Canada); Caroline Haddad; Jean-Sébastien Fecteau	(Soviet Union); Svitlana Prystav; Viacheslav Tkachenko	
1993	(South Korea) Seoul	(Russia); Inga Korshunova; Dmitri Saveliev	(Russia); Maria Petrova; Anton Sikharulidze	(Canada); Isabelle Coulombe; Bruno Marcotte	
1994	(United States) Colorado Springs	(Russia); Maria Petrova; Anton Sikharulidze	(Canada); Caroline Haddad; Jean-Sébastien Fecteau	(Ukraine); Galina Maniachenko; Evgeni Zhigurski	
1995	(Hungary) Budapest	(Russia); Maria Petrova; Anton Sikharulidze	(United States); Danielle Hartsell; Steve Hartsell	(Ukraine); Evgenia Filonenko; Igor Marchenko	
1996	(Australia) Brisbane	(Russia); Victoria Maksyuta; Vladislav Zhovnirski	(Ukraine); Evgenia Filonenko; Igor Marchenko	(United States); Danielle Hartsell; Steve Hartsell	
1997	(South Korea) Seoul	(United States); Danielle Hartsell; Steve Hartsell	(Russia); Maria Petrova; Teimuraz Pulin	(Russia); Victoria Maksyuta; Vladislav Zhovnirski	
1998	(Canada) Saint John	(Ukraine); Julia Obertas; Dmytro Palamarchuk	(Russia); Svetlana Nikolaeva; Alexei Sokolov	(Russia); Victoria Maksyuta; Vladislav Zhovnirski	
1999	(Croatia) Zagreb	(Ukraine); Julia Obertas; Dmytro Palamarchuk	(United States); Laura Handy; Paul Binnebose	(Russia); Victoria Maksyuta; Vladislav Zhovnirski	
2000	(Germany) Oberstdorf	(Ukraine); Aliona Savchenko; Stanislav Morozov	(Ukraine); Julia Obertas; Dmytro Palamarchuk	(Russia); Julia Shapiro; Alexei Sokolov	
2001	(Bulgaria) Sofia	(China); Zhang Dan; Zhang Hao	(Japan); Yuko Kawaguchi; Alexander Markuntsov	(United States); Kristen Roth; Michael McPherson	
2002	(Norway) Hamar	(Russia); Elena Riabchuk; Stanislav Zakharov	(Russia); Julia Karbovskaya; Sergei Slavnov	(China); Ding Yang; Ren Zhongfei	
2003	(Czech Republic) Ostrava	(China); Zhang Dan; Zhang Hao	(China); Ding Yang; Ren Zhongfei	(United States); Jennifer Don; Jonathon Hunt	
2004	(Netherlands) The Hague	(Russia); Natalia Shestakova; Pavel Lebedev	(Canada); Jessica Dubé; Bryce Davison	(Russia); Maria Mukhortova; Maxim Trankov	
2005	(Canada) Kitchener	(Russia); Maria Mukhortova; Maxim Trankov	(Canada); Jessica Dubé; Bryce Davison	(Russia); Tatiana Kokoreva; Egor Golovkin	
2006	(Slovenia) Ljubljana	(United States); Julia Vlassov; Drew Meekins	(United States); Kendra Moyle; Andy Seitz	(Russia); Ksenia Krasilnikova; Konstantin Bezmaternikh	
2007	(Germany) Oberstdorf	(United States); Keauna McLaughlin; Rockne Brubaker	(Russia); Vera Bazarova; Yuri Larionov	(Russia); Ksenia Krasilnikova; Konstantin Bezmaternikh	
2008	(Bulgaria) Sofia	(Russia); Ksenia Krasilnikova; Konstantin Bezmaternikh	(Russia); Liubov Ilyushechkina; Nodari Maisuradze	(China); Dong Huibo; Wu Yiming	
2009	(Bulgaria) Sofia	(Russia); Liubov Ilyushechkina; Nodari Maisuradze	(Russia); Anastasia Martiusheva; Alexei Rogonov	(United States); Marissa Castelli; Simon Shnapir	
2010	(Netherlands) The Hague	(China); Sui Wenjing; Han Cong	(Japan); Narumi Takahashi; Mervin Tran	(Russia); Ksenia Stolbova; Fedor Klimov	
2011	(South Korea) Gangneung	(China); Sui Wenjing; Han Cong	(Russia); Ksenia Stolbova; Fedor Klimov	(Japan); Narumi Takahashi; Mervin Tran	
2012	(Belarus) Minsk	(China); Sui Wenjing; Han Cong	(China); Yu Xiaoyu; Jin Yang	(Russia); Vasilisa Davankova; Andrei Deputat	
2013	(Italy) Milan	(United States); Haven Denney; Brandon Frazier	(Canada); Margaret Purdy; Michael Marinaro	(Russia); Lina Fedorova; Maxim Miroshkin	
2014	(Bulgaria) Sofia	(China); Yu Xiaoyu; Jin Yang	(Russia); Evgenia Tarasova; Vladimir Morozov	(Russia); Maria Vigalova; Egor Zakroev	
2015	(Estonia) Tallinn	(China); Yu Xiaoyu; Jin Yang	(Canada); Julianne Séguin; Charlie Bilodeau	(Russia); Lina Fedorova; Maxim Miroshkin	
2016	(Hungary) Debrecen	(Czech Republic); Anna Dušková; Martin Bidař	(Russia); Anastasia Mishina; Vladislav Mirzoev	(Russia); Ekaterina Borisova; Dmitry Sopot	
2017	(Taiwan) Taipei City	(Australia); Ekaterina Alexandrovskaya; Harley Windsor	(Russia); Aleksandra Boikova; Dmitrii Kozlovskii	(China); Gao Yumeng; Xie Zhong	
2018	(Bulgaria) Sofia	(Russia); Daria Pavliuchenko; Denis Khodykin	(Russia); Polina Kostiukovich; Dmitrii Ialin	(Russia); Anastasia Mishina; Aleksandr Galliamov	
2019	(Croatia) Zagreb	(Russia); Anastasia Mishina; Aleksandr Galliamov	(Russia); Apollinariia Panfilova; Dmitry Rylov	(Russia); Polina Kostiukovich; Dmitrii Ialin	
2020	(Estonia) Tallinn	(Russia); Apollinariia Panfilova; Dmitry Rylov	(Russia); Kseniia Akhanteva; Valerii Kolesov	(Russia); Iuliia Artemeva; Mikhail Nazarychev	
2021	(China) Harbin	Competition cancelled due to the COVID-19 pandemic			
2022	(Estonia) Tallinn	(Georgia (country)); Karina Safina; Luka Berulava	(Australia); Anastasia Golubeva; Hektor Giotopoulos Moore	(Canada); Brooke McIntosh; Benjamin Mimar	
2023	(Canada) Calgary	(United States); Sophia Baram; Daniel Tioumentsev	(Australia); Anastasia Golubeva; Hektor Giotopoulos Moore	(Ukraine); Violetta Sierova; Ivan Khobta	
2024	(Taiwan) Taipei City	(Georgia (country)); Anastasiia Metelkina; Luka Berulava	(United States); Olivia Flores; Luke Wang	(United States); Naomi Williams; Lachlan Lewer	
2025	(Hungary) Debrecen	(Georgia (country)); Anastasiia Metelkina; Luka Berulava	(Ukraine); Sofiia Holichenko; Artem Darenskyi	(Canada); Martina Ariano Kent; Charly Laliberté Laurent	
2026	(Estonia) Tallinn	(Canada); Ava Kemp; Yohnatan Elizarov	(Canada); Jazmine Desroschers; Kieran Thrasher	(Ukraine); Hannah Herrera; Ivan Khobta	

=== Ice dance ===
Ice dance event medalists
Year	Location	Gold	Silver	Bronze	Ref.
1976	(France) Megève	(United Kingdom); Kathryn Winter; Nicky Slater	(United Kingdom); Denise Best; David Dagnell	(France); Martine Olivier; Yves Tarayre	
1977	(France) Megève	(United Kingdom); Wendy Sessions; Mark Reed	(United Kingdom); Karen Barber; Kim Spreyer	(Canada); Marie McNeil; Robert McCall	
1978	(France) Megève	(Soviet Union); Tatiana Durasova; Sergei Ponomarenko	(Canada); Kelly Johnson; Kris Barber	(France); Nathalie Hervé; Pierre Husarek	
1979	(West Germany) Augsburg	(Soviet Union); Tatiana Durasova; Sergei Ponomarenko	(Soviet Union); Elena Batanova; Andrei Antonov	(Canada); Kelly Johnson; Kris Barber	
1980	(France) Megève	(Soviet Union); Elena Batanova; Alexei Soloviev	(Hungary); Judit Péterfy; Csaba Bálint	(United States); Renée Roca; Andrew Ouellette	
1981	(Canada) London	(Soviet Union); Elena Batanova; Alexei Soloviev	(Soviet Union); Natalia Annenko; Vadim Karkachev	(Canada); Karyn Garossino; Rod Garossino	
1982	(West Germany) Oberstdorf	(Soviet Union); Natalia Annenko; Vadim Karkachev	(Soviet Union); Tatiana Gladkova; Igor Shpilband	(United States); Lynda Malek; Alexander Miller	
1983	(Socialist Federal Republic of Yugoslavia) Sarajevo	(Soviet Union); Tatiana Gladkova; Igor Shpilband	(Soviet Union); Elena Novikova; Oleg Bliakhman	(United States); Christina Yatsuhashi; Keith Yatsuhashi	
1984	(Japan) Sapporo	(Soviet Union); Elena Krykanova; Evgeni Platov	(United States); Christina Yatsuhashi; Keith Yatsuhashi	(Soviet Union); Svetlana Liapina; Georgi Sur	
1985	(United States) Colorado Springs	(Soviet Union); Elena Krykanova; Evgeni Platov	(Soviet Union); Svetlana Liapina; Georgi Sur	(France); Doriane Bontemps; Charles Paliard	
1986	(Socialist Federal Republic of Yugoslavia) Sarajevo	(Soviet Union); Elena Krykanova; Evgeni Platov	(Soviet Union); Svetlana Serkeli; Andrei Zharkov	(France); Corinne Paliard; Didier Courtois	
1987	(Canada) Kitchener	(Soviet Union); Ilona Melnichenko; Gennady Kaskov	(Soviet Union); Oksana Grishuk; Alexandr Chichkov	(Canada); Catherine Pal; Donald Godfrey	
1988	(Australia) Brisbane	(Soviet Union); Oksana Grishuk; Alexandr Chichkov	(Soviet Union); Irina Antsiferova; Maxim Sevastianov	(Soviet Union); Maria Orlova; Oleg Ovsyannikov	
1989	(Socialist Federal Republic of Yugoslavia) Sarajevo	(Soviet Union); Angelika Kirkhmaier; Dmitri Lagutin	(Soviet Union); Liudmila Berezova; Vladimir Fedorov	(France); Marina Morel; Gwendal Peizerat	
1990	(United States) Colorado Springs	(Soviet Union); Marina Anissina; Ilia Averbukh	(Soviet Union); Elena Kustarova; Sergei Romashkin	(Canada); Marie-France Dubreuil; Bruno Yvars	
1991	(Hungary) Budapest	(Soviet Union); Aliki Stergiadu; Juris Razgulajevs	(France); Marina Morel; Gwendal Peizerat	(Soviet Union); Elena Kustarova; Sergei Romashkin	
1992	(Canada) Hull	(Soviet Union); Marina Anissina; Ilia Averbukh	(Soviet Union); Yaroslava Nechaeva; Yuri Chesnichenko	(Canada); Amelie Dion; Alexandre Alain	
1993	(South Korea) Seoul	(Russia); Ekaterina Svirina; Sergei Sakhnovski	(Poland); Sylwia Nowak; Sebastian Kolasiński	(France); Bérangère Nau; Luc Monéger	
1994	(United States) Colorado Springs	(Poland); Sylwia Nowak; Sebastian Kolasiński	(Russia); Ekaterina Svirina; Sergei Sakhnovski	(France); Agnes Jacquemard; Alexis Gayet	
1995	(Hungary) Budapest	(Russia); Olga Sharutenko; Dmitri Naumkin	(France); Stéphanie Guardia; Franck Laporte	(Poland); Iwona Filipowicz; Michał Szumski	
1996	(Australia) Brisbane	(Russia); Ekaterina Davydova; Roman Kostomarov	(France); Isabelle Delobel; Olivier Schoenfelder	(Ukraine); Natalia Gudina; Vitali Kurkudym	
1997	(South Korea) Seoul	(Russia); Nina Ulanova; Michail Stifunin	(Russia); Oksana Potdykova; Denis Petukhov	(Poland); Agata Błażowska; Marcin Kozubek	
1998	(Canada) Saint John	(United States); Jessica Joseph; Charles Butler	(Italy); Federica Faiella; Luciano Milo	(Russia); Oksana Potdykova; Denis Petukhov	
1999	(Croatia) Zagreb	(United States); Jamie Silverstein; Justin Pekarek	(Italy); Federica Faiella; Luciano Milo	(Russia); Natalia Romaniuta; Daniil Barantsev	
2000	(Germany) Oberstdorf	(Russia); Natalia Romaniuta; Daniil Barantsev	(United States); Emilie Nussear; Brandon Forsyth	(United States); Tanith Belbin; Benjamin Agosto	
2001	(Bulgaria) Sofia	(Russia); Natalia Romaniuta; Daniil Barantsev	(United States); Tanith Belbin; Benjamin Agosto	(Russia); Elena Khalyavina; Maxim Shabalin	
2002	(Norway) Hamar	(United States); Tanith Belbin; Benjamin Agosto	(Russia); Elena Khalyavina; Maxim Shabalin	(Russia); Elena Romanovskaya; Alexander Grachev	
2003	(Czech Republic) Ostrava	(Russia); Oksana Domnina; Maxim Shabalin	(Hungary); Nóra Hoffmann; Attila Elek	(Russia); Elena Romanovskaya; Alexander Grachev	
2004	(Netherlands) The Hague	(Russia); Elena Romanovskaya; Alexander Grachev	(Hungary); Nóra Hoffmann; Attila Elek	(United States); Morgan Matthews; Maxim Zavozin	
2005	(Canada) Kitchener	(United States); Morgan Matthews; Maxim Zavozin	(Canada); Tessa Virtue; Scott Moir	(Russia); Anastasia Gorshkova; Ilia Tkachenko	
2006	(Slovenia) Ljubljana	(Canada); Tessa Virtue; Scott Moir	(Russia); Natalia Mikhailova; Arkadi Sergeev	(United States); Meryl Davis; Charlie White	
2007	(Germany) Oberstdorf	(Russia); Ekaterina Bobrova; Dmitri Soloviev	(Estonia); Grethe Grünberg; Kristjan Rand	(Canada); Kaitlyn Weaver; Andrew Poje	
2008	(Bulgaria) Sofia	(United States); Emily Samuelson; Evan Bates	(Canada); Vanessa Crone; Paul Poirier	(Russia); Kristina Gorshkova; Vitali Butikov	
2009	(Bulgaria) Sofia	(United States); Madison Chock; Greg Zuerlein	(United States); Maia Shibutani; Alex Shibutani	(Russia); Ekaterina Riazanova; Jonathan Guerreiro	
2010	(Netherlands) The Hague	(Russia); Elena Ilinykh; Nikita Katsalapov	(Canada); Alexandra Paul; Mitchell Islam	(Russia); Ksenia Monko; Kirill Khaliavin	
2011	(South Korea) Gangneung	(Russia); Ksenia Monko; Kirill Khaliavin	(Russia); Ekaterina Pushkash; Jonathan Guerreiro	(United States); Charlotte Lichtman; Dean Copely	
2012	(Belarus) Minsk	(Russia); Victoria Sinitsina; Ruslan Zhiganshin	(Russia); Alexandra Stepanova; Ivan Bukin	(United States); Alexandra Aldridge; Daniel Eaton	
2013	(Italy) Milan	(Russia); Alexandra Stepanova; Ivan Bukin	(France); Gabriella Papadakis; Guillaume Cizeron	(United States); Alexandra Aldridge; Daniel Eaton	
2014	(Bulgaria) Sofia	(United States); Kaitlin Hawayek; Jean-Luc Baker	(Russia); Anna Yanovskaya; Sergey Mozgov	(Canada); Madeline Edwards; Zhao Kai Pang	
2015	(Estonia) Tallinn	(Russia); Anna Yanovskaya; Sergey Mozgov	(United States); Lorraine McNamara; Quinn Carpenter	(Ukraine); Oleksandra Nazarova; Maksym Nikitin	
2016	(Hungary) Debrecen	(United States); Lorraine McNamara; Quinn Carpenter	(United States); Rachel Parsons; Michael Parsons	(Russia); Alla Loboda; Pavel Drozd	
2017	(Taiwan) Taipei City	(United States); Rachel Parsons; Michael Parsons	(Russia); Alla Loboda; Pavel Drozd	(United States); Christina Carreira; Anthony Ponomarenko	
2018	(Bulgaria) Sofia	(Russia); Anastasia Skoptsova; Kirill Aleshin	(United States); Christina Carreira; Anthony Ponomarenko	(Russia); Arina Ushakova; Maxim Nekrasov	
2019	(Croatia) Zagreb	(Canada); Marjorie Lajoie; Zachary Lagha	(Russia); Elizaveta Khudaiberdieva; Nikita Nazarov	(Russia); Sofia Shevchenko; Igor Eremenko	
2020	(Estonia) Tallinn	(United States); Avonley Nguyen; Vadym Kolesnik	(Georgia (country)); Maria Kazakova; Georgy Reviya	(Russia); Elizaveta Shanaeva; Devid Naryzhnyy	
2021	(China) Harbin	Competition cancelled due to the COVID-19 pandemic			
2022	(Estonia) Tallinn	(United States); Oona Brown; Gage Brown	(Canada); Natalie D'Alessandro; Bruce Waddell	(Canada); Nadiia Bashynska; Peter Beaumont	
2023	(Canada) Calgary	(Czech Republic); Kateřina Mrázková; Daniel Mrázek	(South Korea); Hannah Lim; Ye Quan	(Canada); Nadiia Bashynska; Peter Beaumont	
2024	(Taiwan) Taipei City	(United States); Leah Neset; Artem Markelov	(Israel); Elizabeth Tkachenko; Alexei Kiliakov	(Germany); Darya Grimm; Michail Savitskiy	
2025	(Hungary) Debrecen	(Italy); Noemi Maria Tali; Noah Lafornara	(United States); Katarina Wolfkostin; Dimitry Tsarevski	(Germany); Darya Grimm; Michail Savitskiy	
2026	(Estonia) Tallinn	(United States); Hana Maria Aboian; Daniil Veselukhin	(France); Ambre Perrier Gianesini; Samuel Blanc Klaperman	(Ukraine); Iryna Pidgaina; Artem Koval	

== Records ==
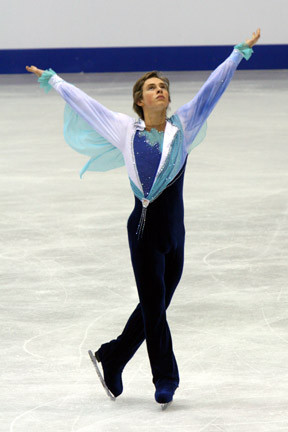
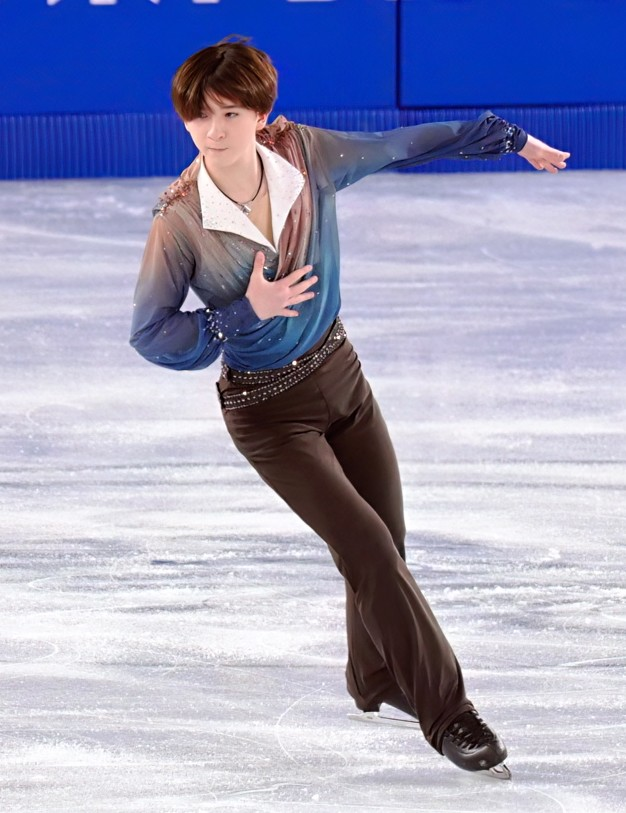
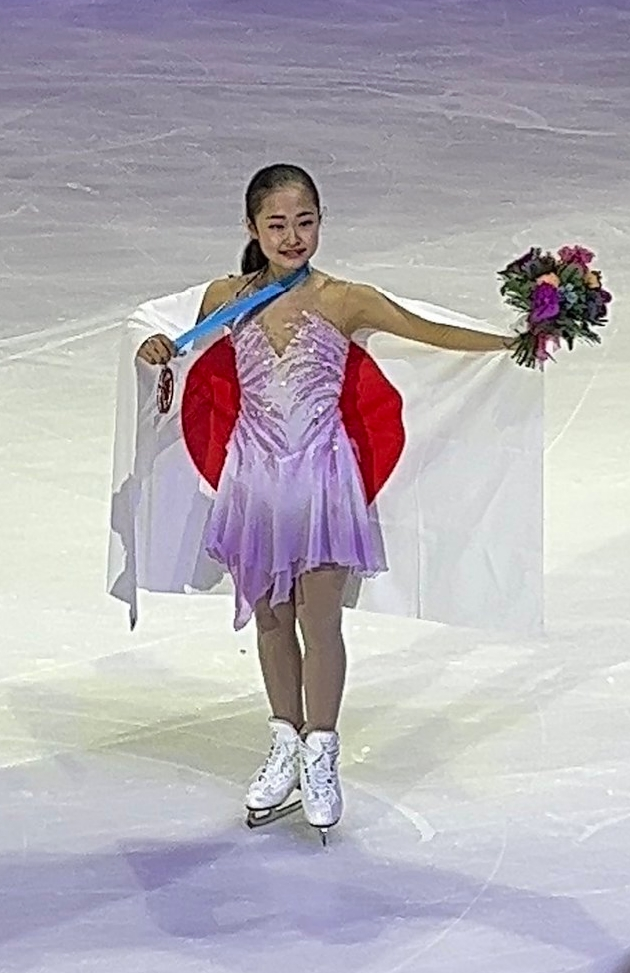
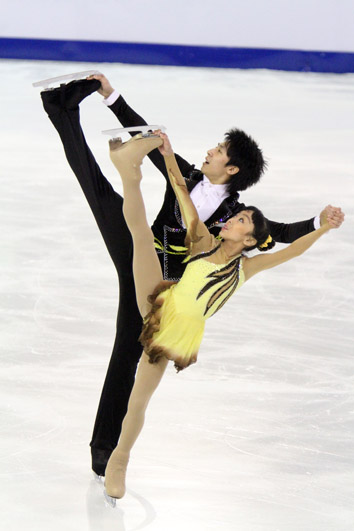
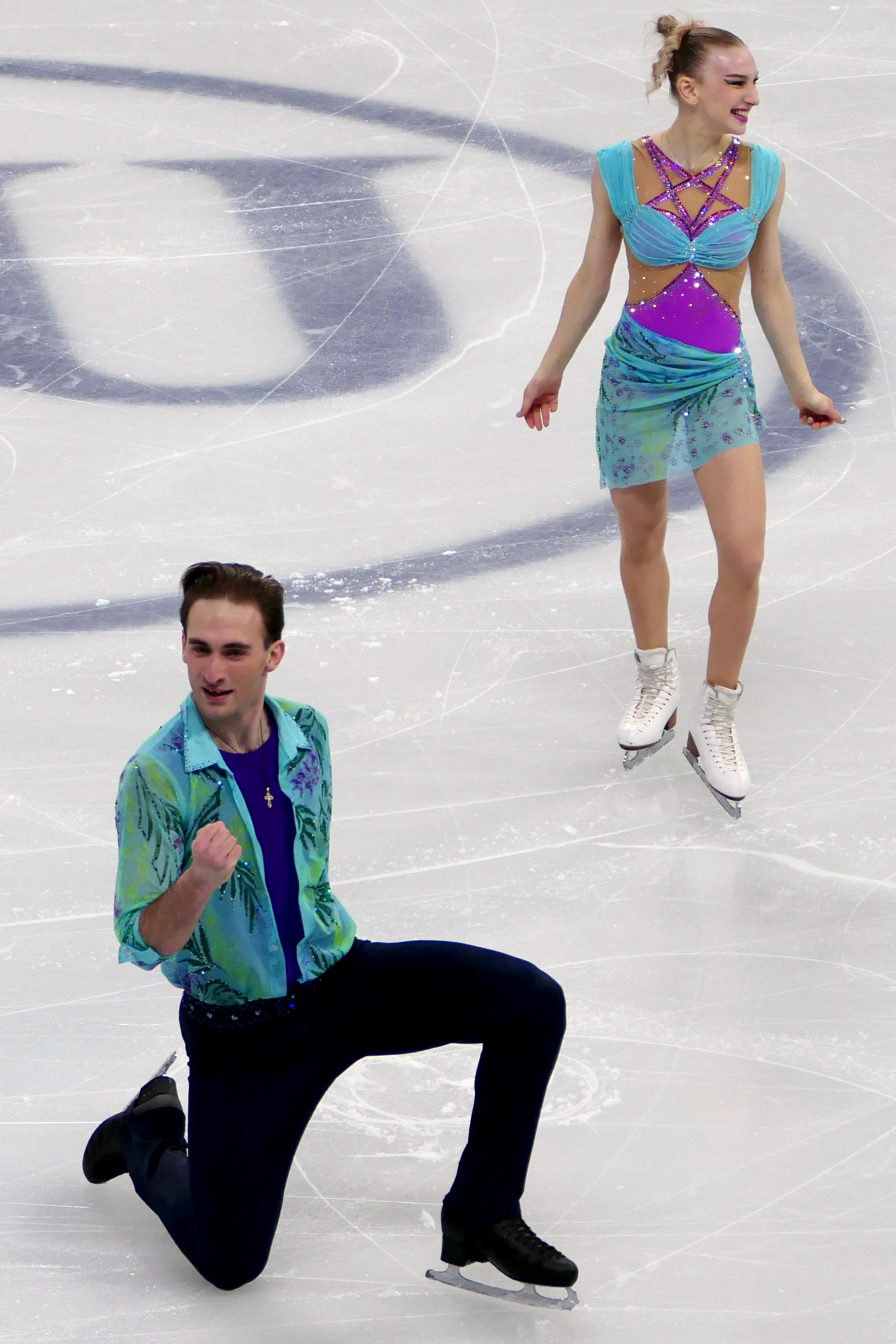
From left to right: Adam Rippon of the United States and Rio Nakata of Japan have each won two World Junior Championship titles in men's singles; Mao Shimada of Japan has won four World Junior Championship titles in women's singles; Sui Wenjing and Han Cong of China have won three World Junior Championship titles in pair skating; and Luka Berulava of Georgia has also won three World Junior Championship titles in pair skating, two of which were with Anastasiia Metelkina.

Records
Discipline	Most championship titles			
Discipline	Skater(s)	No.	Years	Ref.
Men's singles	(Japan); Rio Nakata	2	2025–26	
Men's singles	(United States); Adam Rippon	2	2008–09	
Women's singles	(Japan); Mao Shimada	4	2023–26	
Pairs	(Georgia (country)); Luka Berulava; (Note: Luka Berulava won one championship title while partnered with Karina Safina (2022), and two with Anastasiia Metelkina (2024–25).)	3	2022; 2024–25	
Pairs	(Soviet Union); Natalia Krestianinova; Alexei Torchinski	3	1990–92	
Pairs	(China); Sui Wenjing; Han Cong	3	2010–12	
Ice dance	(Soviet Union); Elena Krykanova; Evgeni Platov	3	1984–86	

== Cumulative medal count ==
- Countries or entities that can no longer participate are indicated in italics with a dagger (†).

=== Men's singles ===
Total number of World Junior Championship medals in men's singles by nation
Rank	Nation	Gold	Silver	Bronze	Total
1	United States	17	12	13	42
2	Soviet Union †	8	8	4	20
3	Russia † (Note: Skaters from Russia have been banned from competing at all international skating events since 2022 due to the Russian invasion of Ukraine.)	8	7	8	23
4	Japan	8	6	7	21
5	Canada	4	3	1	8
6	China	1	2	4	7
7	South Korea	1	2	0	3
8	Germany	1	0	0	1
8	Israel	1	0	0	1
8	Ukraine	1	0	0	1
11	France	0	5	4	9
12	Switzerland	0	1	1	2
13	Belgium	0	1	0	1
13	Czech Republic	0	1	0	1
13	Great Britain	0	1	0	1
13	Kazakhstan	0	1	0	1
17	East Germany †	0	0	3	3
18	Italy	0	0	2	2
18	Slovakia	0	0	2	2
20	Sweden	0	0	1	1
Totals (20 entries)		50	50	50	150

=== Women's singles ===
Total number of World Junior Championship medals in women's singles by nation
Rank	Nation	Gold	Silver	Bronze	Total
1	United States	15	12	12	39
2	Russia †	15	12	9	36
3	Japan	11	6	10	27
4	East Germany †	3	3	2	8
5	Soviet Union †	2	2	2	6
6	France	2	1	1	4
7	South Korea	1	5	0	6
8	Canada	1	1	2	4
9	West Germany †	0	5	2	7
10	Austria	0	1	1	2
10	Hungary	0	1	1	2
12	Australia	0	1	0	1
13	China	0	0	2	2
13	Switzerland	0	0	2	2
15	Finland	0	0	1	1
15	Germany	0	0	1	1
15	Great Britain	0	0	1	1
15	Italy	0	0	1	1
Totals (18 entries)		50	50	50	150

=== Pairs ===
Total number of World Junior Championship medals in pairs by nation
Rank	Nation	Gold	Silver	Bronze	Total
1	Russia †	12	14	17	43
2	Soviet Union †	12	9	8	29
3	China	7	2	3	12
4	United States	6	6	9	21
5	Canada	4	8	4	16
6	Ukraine	3	3	4	10
7	Georgia	3	0	0	3
8	Australia	1	2	1	4
8	East Germany †	1	2	1	4
10	Czech Republic	1	0	0	1
11	Japan	0	2	1	3
12	Czechoslovakia †	0	1	0	1
12	South Africa	0	1	0	1
14	France	0	0	1	1
Totals (14 entries)		50	50	49	149

=== Ice dance ===
Total number of World Junior Championship medals in ice dance by nation
Rank	Nation	Gold	Silver	Bronze	Total
1	Soviet Union †	15	11	3	29
2	Russia †	15	9	13	37
3	United States	13	8	10	31
4	Canada	2	5	10	17
5	Great Britain	2	2	0	4
6	Italy	1	2	0	3
7	Poland	1	1	2	4
8	Czech Republic	1	0	0	1
9	France	0	5	7	12
10	Hungary	0	3	0	3
11	Estonia	0	1	0	1
11	Georgia	0	1	0	1
11	Israel	0	1	0	1
11	South Korea	0	1	0	1
15	Ukraine	0	0	3	3
16	Germany	0	0	2	2
Totals (16 entries)		50	50	50	150

=== Total medals ===
Total number of World Junior Championship medals by nation
Rank	Nation	Gold	Silver	Bronze	Total
1	United States	51	38	44	133
2	Russia †	50	42	47	139
3	Soviet Union †	37	30	17	84
4	Japan	19	14	18	51
5	Canada	11	17	18	46
6	China	8	4	9	21
7	East Germany †	4	4	6	14
8	Ukraine	4	3	7	14
9	Georgia	3	1	0	4
10	France	2	11	13	26
11	South Korea	2	8	0	10
12	Great Britain	2	3	1	6
13	Czech Republic	2	1	0	3
14	Australia	1	3	1	5
15	Italy	1	2	3	6
16	Poland	1	1	2	4
17	Israel	1	1	0	2
18	Germany	1	0	3	4
19	West Germany †	0	6	1	7
20	Hungary	0	4	1	5
21	Switzerland	0	1	3	4
22	Austria	0	1	1	2
23	Belgium	0	1	0	1
23	Czechoslovakia †	0	1	0	1
23	Estonia	0	1	0	1
23	Kazakhstan	0	1	0	1
23	South Africa	0	1	0	1
28	Slovakia	0	0	2	2
29	Finland	0	0	1	1
29	Sweden	0	0	1	1
Totals (30 entries)		200	200	199	599
