= Canadian National Skating Championships =

Annual national figure skating competition

- Status: Active
- Genre: National championships
- Frequency: Annual
- Country: Canada
- Inaugurated: 1905
- Previous event: 2026 Canadian Championships
- Next event: 2027 Canadian Championships
- Organizer: Skate Canada

The Canadian National Skating Championships (French: Championnats nationaux canadiens de patinage) are an annual figure skating competition organized by Skate Canada to crown the national champions of Canada. While the first official Canadian Championships were held in 1914, unofficial championships had been hosted by the Minto Skating Club in Ottawa since 1905. They have been interrupted only twice since 1920. The event was called the Canadian Figure Skating Championships (French: Championnats du Canada de patinage artistique) prior to 2023, when synchronized skating, which had previously held separate championships, was folded into the competition along with the other figure skating disciplines. The results are among the criteria used to determine the Canadian entries to the World Figure Skating Championships, World Junior Figure Skating Championships, Four Continents Figure Skating Championships, and Winter Olympics, as well as the members of the Canadian national team.

Medals are awarded in men's singles, women's singles, pair skating, ice dance, and synchronized skating at the senior and junior levels. Patrick Chan currently holds the record for winning the most Canadian Championship titles in men's singles (with ten), while Constance Wilson-Samuel holds the record in women's singles (with nine). Meagan Duhamel and Eric Radford hold the record in pair skating (with seven), while Shae-Lynn Bourne and Victor Kraatz hold the record in ice dance (with ten).

== History ==
The Amateur Skating Association of Canada was formed in 1887 to govern speed skating and figure skating in Canada. The first Canadian Championships were held in 1905 in Ottawa. Early editions of the championships were hosted by the Minto Skating Club, whose goal was to encourage a Canadian style of skating uniquely different than the traditional English style. This Canadian style was more in line with the international style, incorporating ballet and dance movements with ice skating, "permitting the greatest freedom on the part of the individual in respect to his movements," while the English style was much more rigid and formal, focusing on the tracing of elaborate special figures. The earliest championships featured single skating and pair skating (called "hand-in-hand skating"). Ormond Haycock won the inaugural singles event, as well as the pairs event with his sister Katherine. No competitions were held in 1907 after the Rideau Skating Rink was destroyed by a fire. While separate competitions for men and women were not held until 1913, an award was presented to the "top lady skater" at each competition prior to 1913. A separate governing organization for figure skating in Canada was established in 1914: the Figure Skating Department of the Amateur Skating Association of Canada. This was the forerunner of today's Skate Canada, and as such, the 1914 Canadian Championships are regarded as the first official championships, although they existed as a continuation of these earlier championships.

No competitions were held from 1915 through 1919 due to World War I. During World War II, no senior-level events were contested in 1943, and the women's event was the only senior-level event contested in 1944. Ice dance was added as a discipline in 1947, while the waltz and tenstep competitions were discontinued after 1959. Compulsory figures, which had been a required element of singles skating since the beginning, were retired after the 1990 championships. Competition in four skating was held irregularly, with the final competition taking place in 1997. The 2021 championships were cancelled due to the COVID-19 pandemic; and in December 2021, due to Ontario's COVID-19 public health orders, Skate Canada announced that the 2022 Canadian Championships would be held in a closed arena without spectators or on-site media. Prior to 2023, the Canadian Synchronized Skating Championships had been held as a separate event. Beginning in 2023, the junior- and senior-level synchronized skating competitions were incorporated into the Canadian Figure Skating Championships; hence the change in the event's name.

== Medallists ==
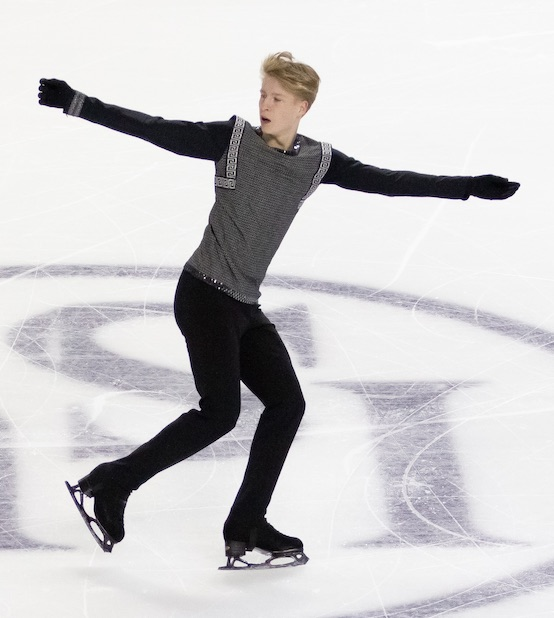
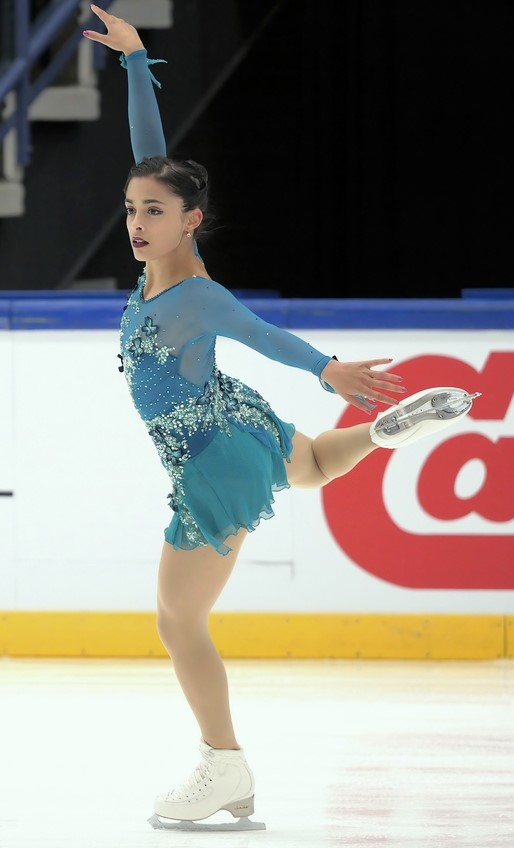
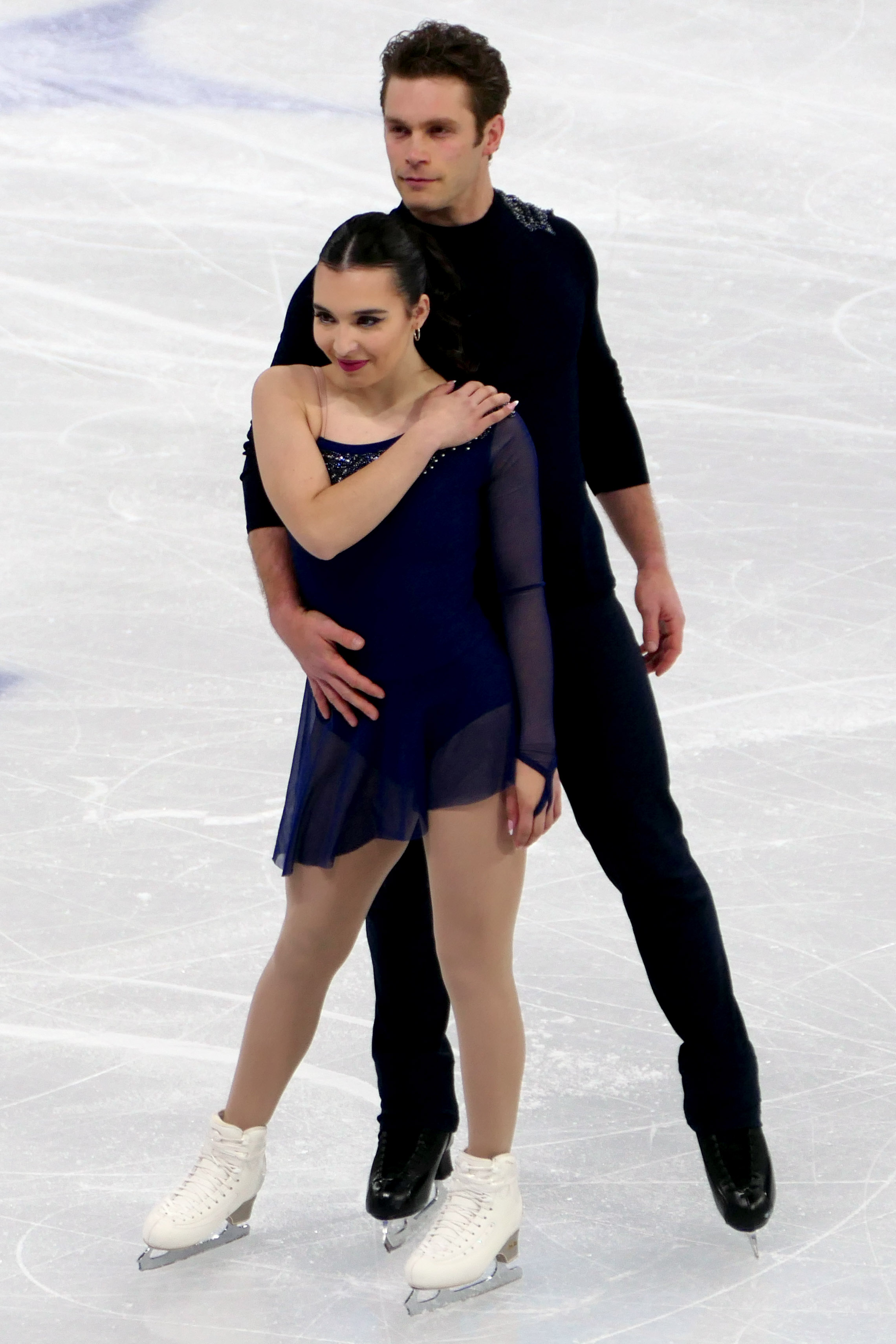
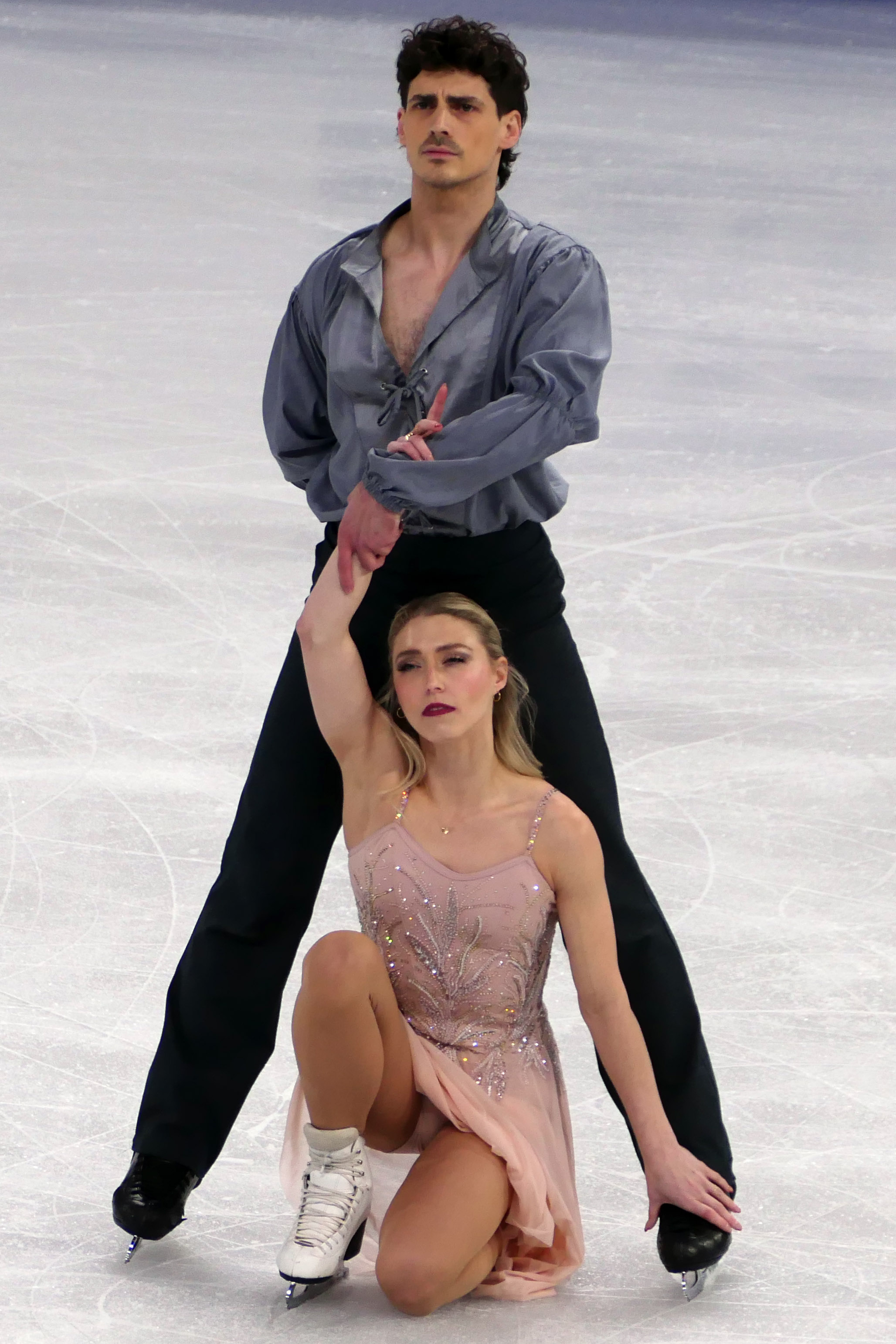
From left to right: The reigning Canadian figure skating champions: Stephen Gogolev (men's singles); Madeline Schizas (women's singles); Lia Pereira and Trennt Michaud (pair skating); and Piper Gilles and Paul Poirier (ice dance)

=== Singles ===
Prior to the establishment of a separate event for women in 1913, men and women competed in the same event.

Senior singles event medallists
Year	Location	Gold	Silver	Bronze	Ref.
1905	Ottawa	Ormond Haycock	Anne Ewan	No other medallists	
1906	Ottawa	Ormond Haycock	Fred Anderson	No other medallists	
1907	Ottawa	Competition cancelled due to fire at the Rideau Skating Rink			
1908	Ottawa	Ormond Haycock	John Joseph Cawthra	No other medallists	
1909	Ottawa	No competition held			
1910	Ottawa	Douglas Nelles	Ormond Haycock	Iris Mudge	
1911	Montreal	Ormond Haycock	J. Cecil McDougall	Evelyn Grey	
1912	Ottawa	Douglas Nelles	Eleanor Kingsford	No other medallists	

=== Men's singles ===
Senior men's event medallists
Year	Location	Gold	Silver	Bronze	Ref.
1913	Ottawa	Philip Chrysler	Norman Scott	No other medallists	
1914	Ottawa	Norman Scott	Philip Chrysler	No other competitors	
1915–19	No competitions due to World War I				
1920	Montreal	Norman Scott	Duncan Hodgson	Melville Rogers	
1921	Montreal	Norman Scott	John Machado	Melville Rogers	
1922	Ottawa	Duncan Hodgson	Melville Rogers	John Machado	
1923	Toronto	Melville Rogers	John Machado	Norman Gregory	
1924	Montreal	John Machado	Montgomery Wilson	Norman Gregory	
1925	Ottawa	Melville Rogers	John Machado	Montgomery Wilson	
1926	Toronto	Melville Rogers	Montgomery Wilson	No other competitors	
1927	Montreal	Melville Rogers	Montgomery Wilson	Jack Eastwood	
1928	Toronto	Melville Rogers	No other competitors		
1929	Ottawa	Montgomery Wilson	Stewart Reburn	Jack Eastwood	
1930	Winnipeg	Montgomery Wilson	Lewis Elkin	No other competitors	
1931	Toronto	Montgomery Wilson	Stewart Reburn	Lewis Elkin	
1932	Toronto	Montgomery Wilson	Guy Owen	Hubert Sprott	
1933	Montreal	Montgomery Wilson	Guy Owen	Rupert Whitehead	
1934	Toronto	Montgomery Wilson	Guy Owen	Rupert Whitehead	
1935	Ottawa	Montgomery Wilson	Osborne Colson	Guy Owen	
1936	Toronto	Osborne Colson	Wingate Snaith	Philip Lee	
1937	Montreal	Osborne Colson	Wingate Snaith	Ralph McCreath	
1938	Winnipeg	Montgomery Wilson	Ralph McCreath	Wingate Snaith	
1939	Toronto	Montgomery Wilson	Ralph McCreath	Jack Vigeon	
1940	Ottawa	Ralph McCreath	Donald Gilchrist	Wingate Snaith	
1941	Montreal	Ralph McCreath	Donald Gilchrist	Jack Vigeon	
1942	Winnipeg	Michael Kirby	Donald Gilchrist	No other competitors	
1943–44	Toronto	No senior men's competitions due to World War II			
1945	Toronto	Nigel Stephens	Frank Sellers	No other competitors	
1946	Toronto	Ralph McCreath	Norris Bowden	Roger Wickson	
1947	Toronto	Norris Bowden	Wallace Diestelmeyer	Gerrard Blair	
1948	Calgary	Wallace Diestelmeyer	Roger Wickson	No other competitors	
1949	Ottawa	Roger Wickson	William Lewis	Donald Tobin	
1950	St. Catharines	Roger Wickson	Donald Tobin	William Lewis	
1951	Vancouver	Peter Firstbrook	Roger Wickson	William Lewis	
1952	Oshawa	Peter Firstbrook	William Lewis	Peter Dunfield	
1953	Ottawa	Peter Firstbrook	Charles Snelling	Peter Dunfield	
1954	Calgary	Charles Snelling	Douglas Court	Paul Tatton	
1955	Toronto	Charles Snelling	Douglas Court	No other competitors	
1956	Galt	Charles Snelling	Donald Jackson	Douglas Court	
1957	Winnipeg	Charles Snelling	Donald Jackson	Edward Collins	
1958	Ottawa	Charles Snelling	Donald Jackson	Edward Collins	
1959	Noranda	Donald Jackson	Edward Collins	No other competitors	
1960	Regina	Donald Jackson	Donald McPherson	Louis Stong	
1961	Lachine	Donald Jackson	Donald McPherson	Bradley Black	
1962	Toronto	Donald Jackson	Donald McPherson	Donald Knight	
1963	Edmonton	Donald McPherson	Donald Knight	William Neale	
1964	North Bay	Charles Snelling	Donald Knight	Jay Humphry	
1965	Calgary	Donald Knight	Charles Snelling	Jay Humphry	
1966	Peterborough	Donald Knight	Charles Snelling	Jay Humphry	
1967	Toronto	Donald Knight	Jay Humphry	Charles Snelling	
1968	Vancouver	Jay Humphry	David McGillivray	Steve Hutchinson	
1969	Toronto	Jay Humphry	David McGillivray	Toller Cranston	
1970	Edmonton	David McGillivray	Toller Cranston	Ron Shaver	
1971	Winnipeg	Toller Cranston	Paul Bonenfant	Kenneth Polk	
1972	London	Toller Cranston	Paul Bonenfant	Kenneth Polk	
1973	Vancouver	Toller Cranston	Ron Shaver	Robert Rubens	
1974	Moncton	Toller Cranston	Ron Shaver	Robert Rubens	
1975	Quebec City	Toller Cranston	Robert Rubens	Stan Bohonek	
1976	London	Toller Cranston	Ron Shaver	Stan Bohonek	
1977	Calgary	Ron Shaver	Brian Pockar	Vern Taylor	
1978	Victoria	Brian Pockar	Vern Taylor	Jim Szabo	
1979	Thunder Bay	Brian Pockar	Vern Taylor	Gordon Forbes	
1980	Kitchener	Brian Pockar	Gordon Forbes	Gary Beacom	
1981	Halifax	Brian Orser	Brian Pockar	Gordon Forbes	
1982	Brandon	Brian Orser	Brian Pockar	Dennis Coi	
1983	Montreal	Brian Orser	Gary Beacom	Gordon Forbes	
1984	Regina	Brian Orser	Gary Beacom	Gordon Forbes	
1985	Moncton	Brian Orser	Neil Paterson	Gordon Forbes	
1986	North Bay	Brian Orser	Neil Paterson	Jaimee Eggleton	
1987	Ottawa	Brian Orser	Kurt Browning	Michael Slipchuk	
1988	Victoria	Brian Orser	Kurt Browning	Neil Paterson	
1989	Chicoutimi	Kurt Browning	Michael Slipchuk	Matthew Hall	
1990	Sudbury	Kurt Browning	Elvis Stojko	Michael Slipchuk	
1991	Saskatoon	Kurt Browning	Elvis Stojko	Michael Slipchuk	
1992	Moncton	Michael Slipchuk	Elvis Stojko	Sébastien Britten	
1993	Hamilton	Kurt Browning	Elvis Stojko	Marcus Christensen	
1994	Edmonton	Elvis Stojko	Kurt Browning	Sébastien Britten	
1995	Halifax	Sébastien Britten	Marcus Christensen	Ravi Walia	
1996	Ottawa	Elvis Stojko	Sébastien Britten	Marcus Christensen	
1997	Vancouver	Elvis Stojko	Jeff Langdon	Sébastien Britten	
1998	Hamilton	Elvis Stojko	Emanuel Sandhu	Jeffrey Langdon	
1999	Ottawa	Elvis Stojko	Emanuel Sandhu	Jean-François Hébert	
2000	Calgary	Elvis Stojko	Emanuel Sandhu	Ben Ferreira	
2001	Winnipeg	Emanuel Sandhu	Jayson Dénommée	Ben Ferreira	
2002	Hamilton	Elvis Stojko	Emanuel Sandhu	Jeffrey Buttle	
2003	Saskatoon	Emanuel Sandhu	Jeffrey Buttle	Fedor Andreev	
2004	Edmonton	Emanuel Sandhu	Ben Ferreira	Jeffrey Buttle	
2005	London	Jeffrey Buttle	Emanuel Sandhu	Shawn Sawyer	
2006	Ottawa	Jeffrey Buttle	Emanuel Sandhu	Shawn Sawyer	
2007	Halifax	Jeffrey Buttle	Christopher Mabee	Emanuel Sandhu	
2008	Vancouver	Patrick Chan	Jeffrey Buttle	Shawn Sawyer	
2009	Saskatoon	Patrick Chan	Vaughn Chipeur	Jeremy Ten	
2010	London	Patrick Chan	Vaughn Chipeur	Kevin Reynolds	
2011	Victoria	Patrick Chan	Shawn Sawyer	Joey Russell	
2012	Moncton	Patrick Chan	Kevin Reynolds	Jeremy Ten	
2013	Mississauga	Patrick Chan	Kevin Reynolds	Andrei Rogozine	
2014	Ottawa	Patrick Chan	Kevin Reynolds	Liam Firus	
2015	Kingston	Nam Nguyen	Jeremy Ten	Liam Firus	
2016	Halifax	Patrick Chan	Liam Firus	Kevin Reynolds	
2017	Ottawa	Patrick Chan	Kevin Reynolds	Nam Nguyen	
2018	Vancouver	Patrick Chan	Keegan Messing	Nam Nguyen	
2019	Saint John	Nam Nguyen	Stephen Gogolev	Keegan Messing	
2020	Mississauga	Roman Sadovsky	Nam Nguyen	Keegan Messing	
2021	Vancouver	Competition cancelled due to the COVID-19 pandemic			
2022	Ottawa	Keegan Messing	Roman Sadovsky	Wesley Chiu	
2023	Oshawa	Keegan Messing	Conrad Orzel	Wesley Chiu	
2024	Calgary	Wesley Chiu	Aleksa Rakic	Anthony Paradis	
2025	Laval	Roman Sadovsky	Anthony Paradis	David Li	
2026	Gatineau	Stephen Gogolev	Roman Sadovsky	Aleksa Rakic	

=== Women's singles ===
Although the Canadian Championships from 1905 to 1912 did not have separate competitions for men and women, an award was presented to the "top lady skater".

Senior women's event medallists
Year	Location	Gold	Silver	Bronze	Ref.
1905	Ottawa	Anne Ewan	No other medallists		
1906	Ottawa	Aimée Haycock	No other medallists		
1907	Ottawa	Competition cancelled due to fire at the Rideau Skating Rink			
1908	Ottawa	Iris Mudge	No other medallists		
1909	Ottawa	No competition held			
1910	Ottawa	Iris Mudge	No other medallists		
1911	Montreal	Evelyn Grey	No other medallists		
1912	Ottawa	Eleanor Kingsford	No other medallists		
1913	Ottawa	Eleanor Kingsford	Jeanne Chevalier	No other medallists	
1914	Ottawa	Muriel Maunsell	Jeanne Chevalier	No other medallists	
1915–19	No competitions due to World War I				
1920	Montreal	Jeanne Chevalier	Dorothy Jenkins	Alden Godwin	
1921	Montreal	Jeanne Chevalier	Dorothy Jenkins	Alden Godwin	
1922	Ottawa	Dorothy Jenkins	Alden Godwin	Eleanor Law	
1923	Toronto	Dorothy Jenkins	Cecil Smith	Constance Wilson	
1924	Montreal	Constance Wilson	Margot Barclay	Marjorie Annable	
1925	Ottawa	Cecil Smith	Constance Wilson	Marjorie Annable	
1926	Toronto	Cecil Smith	Constance Wilson	Edith Secord	
1927	Montreal	Constance Wilson	Cecil Smith	Evelyn Darling	
1928	Toronto	Margot Barclay	Marion McDougall	Dorothy Benson	
1929	Ottawa	Constance Wilson-Samuel	Cecil Smith	Dorothy Benson	
1930	Winnipeg	Constance Wilson-Samuel	Elizabeth Fisher	Dorothy Benson	
1931	Toronto	Constance Wilson-Samuel	Cecil Smith	Elizabeth Fisher	
1932	Toronto	Constance Wilson-Samuel	Veronica Clarke	Elizabeth Fisher	
1933	Montreal	Constance Wilson-Samuel	Cecil Smith	Veronica Clarke	
1934	Toronto	Constance Wilson-Samuel	Veronica Clarke	Kathleen Lopdell	
1935	Ottawa	Constance Wilson-Samuel	Veronica Clarke	Frances Claudet	
1936	Toronto	Eleanor O'Meara	Veronica Clarke	Margaret Leslie	
1937	Montreal	Dorothy Caley	Eleanor O'Meara	Veronica Clarke	
1938	Winnipeg	Eleanor O'Meara	Dorothy Caley	Eleanor Wilson	
1939	Toronto	Mary Rose Thacker	Norah McCarthy	Eleanor O'Meara	
1940	Ottawa	Norah McCarthy	Mary Rose Thacker	Eleanor O'Meara	
1941	Montreal	Mary Rose Thacker	Barbara Ann Scott	Norah McCarthy	
1942	Winnipeg	Mary Rose Thacker	Barbara Ann Scott	Elizabeth McKellar	
1943	Toronto	No senior women's competition due to World War II			
1944	Toronto	Barbara Ann Scott	Marilyn Ruth Take	Nadine Phillips	
1945	Toronto	Barbara Ann Scott	Marilyn Ruth Take	Gloria Lillico	
1946	Toronto	Barbara Ann Scott	Marilyn Ruth Take	Nadine Phillips	
1947	Toronto	Marilyn Ruth Take	Nadine Phillips	Suzanne Morrow	
1948	Calgary	Barbara Ann Scott	Jeanne Matthews	Marlene Smith	
1949	Ottawa	Suzanne Morrow	Patricia Earl	Jeanne Matthews	
1950	St. Catharines	Suzanne Morrow	Marlene Smith	Vevi Smith	
1951	Vancouver	Suzanne Morrow	Vevi Smith	Jane Kirby	
1952	Oshawa	Marlene Smith	Vevi Smith	Elizabeth Gratton	
1953	Ottawa	Barbara Gratton	Dawn Steckley	Yarmila Pachl	
1954	Calgary	Barbara Gratton	Sonja Currie	Vevi Smith	
1955	Toronto	Carole Jane Pachl	Ann Johnston	Joan Shippam	
1956	Galt	Carole Jane Pachl	Ann Johnston	Sonja Currie	
1957	Winnipeg	Carole Jane Pachl	Karen Dixon	Margaret Crosland	
1958	Ottawa	Margaret Crosland	Doreen Lister	Sonia Snelling	
1959	Noranda	Margaret Crosland	Sonia Snelling	Sandra Tewkesbury	
1960	Regina	Wendy Griner	Shirra Kenworthy	Sonia Snelling	
1961	Lachine	Wendy Griner	Shirra Kenworthy	Sonia Snelling	
1962	Toronto	Wendy Griner	Petra Burka	Shirra Kenworthy	
1963	Edmonton	Wendy Griner	Petra Burka	Shirra Kenworthy	
1964	North Bay	Petra Burka	Wendy Griner	Shirra Kenworthy	
1965	Calgary	Petra Burka	Valérie Jones	Gloria Tatton	
1966	Peterborough	Petra Burka	Valérie Jones	Roberta Laurent	
1967	Toronto	Valérie Jones	Karen Magnussen	Roberta Laurent	
1968	Vancouver	Karen Magnussen	Linda Carbonetto	Lyndsai Cowan	
1969	Toronto	Linda Carbonetto	Karen Magnussen	Cathy Lee Irwin	
1970	Edmonton	Karen Magnussen	Cathy Lee Irwin	Karen Grobba	
1971	Winnipeg	Karen Magnussen	Ruth Hutchinson	Diane Hall	
1972	London	Karen Magnussen	Ruth Hutchinson	Cathy Lee Irwin	
1973	Vancouver	Karen Magnussen	Cathy Lee Irwin	Lynn Nightingale	
1974	Moncton	Lynn Nightingale	Barbara Terpenning	Darya Prychun	
1975	Quebec City	Lynn Nightingale	Kim Alletson	Barbara Terpenning	
1976	London	Lynn Nightingale	Kim Alletson	Susan MacDonald	
1977	Calgary	Lynn Nightingale	Heather Kemkaran	Kim Alletson	
1978	Victoria	Heather Kemkaran	Cathie MacFarlane	Peggy McLean	
1979	Thunder Bay	Janet Morrissey	Heather Kemkaran	Deborah Albright	
1980	Kitchener	Heather Kemkaran	Janet Morrissey	Tracey Wainman	
1981	Halifax	Tracey Wainman	Kay Thomson	Elizabeth Manley	
1982	Brandon	Kay Thomson	Elizabeth Manley	Tracey Wainman	
1983	Montreal	Kay Thomson	Charlene Wong	Cynthia Coull	
1984	Regina	Kay Thomson	Elizabeth Manley	Cynthia Coull	
1985	Moncton	Elizabeth Manley	Cynthia Coull	Charlene Wong	
1986	North Bay	Tracey Wainman	Elizabeth Manley	Patricia Schmidt	
1987	Ottawa	Elizabeth Manley	Patricia Schmidt	Linda Florkevich	
1988	Victoria	Elizabeth Manley	Charlene Wong	Shannon Allison	
1989	Chicoutimi	Karen Preston	Charlene Wong	Lisa Sargeant	
1990	Sudbury	Lisa Sargeant	Charlene Wong	Josée Chouinard	
1991	Saskatoon	Josée Chouinard	Lisa Sargeant	Tanya Bingert	
1992	Moncton	Karen Preston	Josée Chouinard	Tanya Bingert	
1993	Hamilton	Josée Chouinard	Karen Preston	Susan Humphreys	
1994	Edmonton	Josée Chouinard	Susan Humphreys	Karen Preston	
1995	Halifax	Netty Kim	Jennifer Robinson	Susan Humphreys	
1996	Ottawa	Jennifer Robinson	Josée Chouinard	Susan Humphreys	
1997	Vancouver	Susan Humphreys	Angela Derochie	Jennifer Robinson	
1998	Hamilton	Angela Derochie	Keyla Ohs	Jennifer Robinson	
1999	Ottawa	Jennifer Robinson	Annie Bellemare	Angela Derochie	
2000	Calgary	Jennifer Robinson	Michelle Currie	Annie Bellemare	
2001	Winnipeg	Jennifer Robinson	Nicole Watt	Annie Bellemare	
2002	Hamilton	Jennifer Robinson	Annie Bellemare	Joannie Rochette	
2003	Saskatoon	Jennifer Robinson	Joannie Rochette	Annie Bellemare	
2004	Edmonton	Cynthia Phaneuf	Joannie Rochette	Jennifer Robinson	
2005	London	Joannie Rochette	Cynthia Phaneuf	Mira Leung	
2006	Ottawa	Joannie Rochette	Mira Leung	Lesley Hawker	
2007	Halifax	Joannie Rochette	Mira Leung	Lesley Hawker	
2008	Vancouver	Joannie Rochette	Mira Leung	Cynthia Phaneuf	
2009	Saskatoon	Joannie Rochette	Cynthia Phaneuf	Amélie Lacoste	
2010	London	Joannie Rochette	Cynthia Phaneuf	Myriane Samson	
2011	Victoria	Cynthia Phaneuf	Myriane Samson	Amélie Lacoste	
2012	Moncton	Amélie Lacoste	Cynthia Phaneuf	Kaetlyn Osmond	
2013	Mississauga	Kaetlyn Osmond	Gabrielle Daleman	Alaine Chartrand	
2014	Ottawa	Kaetlyn Osmond	Gabrielle Daleman	Amélie Lacoste	
2015	Kingston	Gabrielle Daleman	Alaine Chartrand	Véronik Mallet	
2016	Halifax	Alaine Chartrand	Gabrielle Daleman	Kaetlyn Osmond	
2017	Ottawa	Kaetlyn Osmond	Gabrielle Daleman	Alaine Chartrand	
2018	Vancouver	Gabrielle Daleman	Kaetlyn Osmond	Larkyn Austman	
2019	Saint John	Alaine Chartrand	Aurora Cotop	Véronik Mallet	
2020	Mississauga	Emily Bausback	Alison Schumacher	Madeline Schizas	
2021	Vancouver	Competition cancelled due to the COVID-19 pandemic			
2022	Ottawa	Madeline Schizas	Véronik Mallet	Gabrielle Daleman	
2023	Oshawa	Madeline Schizas	Kaiya Ruiter	Fiona Bombardier	
2024	Calgary	Kaiya Ruiter	Madeline Schizas	Hetty Shi	
2025	Laval	Madeline Schizas	Sara-Maude Dupuis	Katherine Medland Spence	
2026	Gatineau	Madeline Schizas	Gabrielle Daleman	Minsol Kwon	

=== Pairs ===
Senior pairs' event medallists
Year	Location	Gold	Silver	Bronze	Ref.
1905	Ottawa	Katherine Haycock; Ormond Haycock	Amy Maud Vernon Ritchie; James Smellie	Grace Ritchie; Fred Anderson	
1906	Ottawa	Katherine Haycock; Ormond Haycock	Miss E. Clemus; Mr. E.T.B. Gillmore	No other competitors	
1907	No competition due to fire at the Rideau Skating Rink				
1908	Ottawa	Aimée Haycock; Ormond Haycock	No other competitors		
1909	No competition held				
1910	Ottawa	Evelyn Grey; Ormond Haycock	No other competitors		
1911	Montreal	Evelyn Grey; Ormond Haycock	Eleanor Kingsford; Philip Chrysler	No other competitors	
1912	Ottawa	Eleanor Kingsford; Douglas Nelles	Jeanne Chevalier; Allen Richardson	Muriel Mansell; Gordon McLennan	
1913	Ottawa	Muriel Burrows; Gordon McLennan	Jeanne Chevalier; Norman Scott	No other medallists	
1914	Ottawa	Jeanne Chevalier; Norman Scott	Muriel Burrows; Gordon McLennan	No other medallists	
1915–19	No competitions due to World War I				
1920	Montreal	Alden Godwin; Douglas Nelles	Beatrice McDougall; Allan Howard	No other competitors	
1921	Montreal	Beatrice McDougall; Allan Howard	Dorothy Jenkins; C.J. Allan	No other competitors	
1922	Ottawa	Alden Godwin; A.G. McLennan	Jeanette Rathbun; Melville Rogers	Edith Secord; Douglas Nelles	
1923	Toronto	Marjorie Anable; Duncan Hodgson	Dorothy Jenkins; A.G. McLennan	Cecil Smith; Melville Rogers	
1924	Montreal	Elizabeth Blair; John Machado	Margot Barclay; Norman Gregory	Evelyn Darling; Hugh Tarbox	
1925	Ottawa	Gladys Rogers; Melville Rogers	Elizabeth Machado; John Machado	Frances Claudet; Ted Beament	
1926	Toronto	Constance Wilson; Errol Morson	Marion McDougall; Chauncey Bangs	Isabel Blythe; Melville Rogers	
1927	Montreal	Marion McDougall; Chauncey Bangs	Constance Wilson; Montgomery Wilson	Elizabeth Machado; John Machado	
1928	Toronto	Marion McDougall; Chauncey Bangs	Gladys Rogers; Melville Rogers	Veronica Clarke; Stewart Reburn	
1929	Ottawa	Constance Wilson-Samuel; Montgomery Wilson	Maude Smith; Jack Eastwood	Gladys Rogers; Melville Rogers	
1930	Winnipeg	Constance Wilson-Samuel; Montgomery Wilson	Margaret Winks; Lewis Elkin	No other competitors	
1931	Toronto	Frances Claudet; Chauncey Bangs	Constance Wilson-Samuel; Montgomery Wilson	Cecil Smith; Stewart Reburn	
1932	Toronto	Constance Wilson-Samuel; Montgomery Wilson	Frances Claudet; Chauncey Bangs	Maude Smith; Jack Eastwood	
1933	Montreal	Constance Wilson-Samuel; Montgomery Wilson	Maude Smith; Jack Eastwood	Kathleen Lopdell; Donald Cruikshank	
1934	Toronto	Constance Wilson-Samuel; Montgomery Wilson	Louise Bertram; Stewart Reburn	Maude Smith; Jack Eastwood	
1935	Ottawa	Louise Bertram; Stewart Reburn	Audrey Garland; Fraser Sweatman	Constance Wilson-Samuel; Montgomery Wilson	
1936	Toronto	Veronica Clarke; Ralph McCreath	Aidrie Cruikshank; Donald Cruikshank	Mary Jane Halstead; Osborne Colson	
1937	Montreal	Veronica Clarke; Ralph McCreath	Aidrie Cruikshank; Donald Cruikshank	Mary Jane Halsted; Jack Eastwood	
1938	Winnipeg	Veronica Clarke; Ralph McCreath	Patricia Chown; Philip Lee	Mrs. G.M. Black; Jack Kilgour	
1939	Toronto	Norah McCarthy; Ralph McCreath	Aidrie Cruikshank; Donald Cruikshank	Kathleen Lopdell; Peter Chance	
1940	Ottawa	Norah McCarthy; Ralph McCreath	Christine Newson; Sandy McKechnie	Eleanor O'Meara; Donald Gilchrist	
1941	Montreal	Eleanor O'Meara; Ralph McCreath	Norah McCarthy; Sandy McKechnie	No other competitors	
1942	Winnipeg	Eleanor O'Meara; Sandy McKechnie	Floraine Ducharme; Wallace Diestelmeyer	No other competitors	
1943–44	Toronto	No senior pairs competitions due to World War II			
1945	Toronto	Olga Bernyk; Alex Fulton	Sheila Smith; Ross Smith	No other competitors	
1946	Toronto	Joyce Perkins; Wallace Diestelmeyer	Suzanne Morrow; Norris Bowden	No other competitors	
1947	Toronto	Suzanne Morrow; Wallace Diestelmeyer	Margaret Roberts; Bruce Hyland	No other competitors	
1948	Calgary	Suzanne Morrow; Wallace Diestelmeyer	Sheila Smith; Ross Smith	No other competitors	
1949	Ottawa	Marlene Smith; Donald Gilchrist	Pearle Simmers; David Spalding	Joyce Perkins; Bruce Hyland	
1950	St. Catharines	Marlene Smith; Donald Gilchrist	No other competitors		
1951	Vancouver	Jane Kirby; Donald Tobin	Frances Dafoe; Norris Bowden	Gayle Wakely; David Spalding	
1952	Oshawa	Frances Dafoe; Norris Bowden	Audrey Downie; Brian Power	No other competitors	
1953	Ottawa	Frances Dafoe; Norris Bowden	Dawn Steckley; David Lowery	No other competitors	
1954	Calgary	Frances Dafoe; Norris Bowden	Audrey Downie; Brian Power	Dawn Steckley; David Lowery	
1955	Toronto	Frances Dafoe; Norris Bowden	Barbara Wagner; Robert Paul	Audrey Downie; Brian Power	
1956	Galt	Barbara Wagner; Robert Paul	Maria Jelinek; Otto Jelinek	Dianne Neilson; Edwin Cossitt	
1957	Winnipeg	Barbara Wagner; Robert Paul	Maria Jelinek; Otto Jelinek	Barbara Bourne; Thomas Monypenny	
1958	Ottawa	Barbara Wagner; Robert Paul	Maria Jelinek; Otto Jelinek	No other competitors	
1959	Noranda	Barbara Wagner; Robert Paul	Jane Sinclair; Larry Rost	Lise Petit; Ian Knight	
1960	Regina	Barbara Wagner; Robert Paul	Maria Jelinek; Otto Jelinek	Debbi Wilkes; Guy Revell	
1961	Lachine	Maria Jelinek; Otto Jelinek	Gertrude Desjardins; Maurice Lafrance	Debbi Wilkes; Guy Revell	
1962	Toronto	Maria Jelinek; Otto Jelinek	Gertrude Desjardins; Maurice Lafrance	Debbi Wilkes; Guy Revell	
1963	Edmonton	Debbi Wilkes; Guy Revell	Gertrude Desjardins; Maurice Lafrance	Linda Ann Ward; Neil Carpenter	
1964	North Bay	Debbi Wilkes; Guy Revell	Linda Ann Ward; Neil Carpenter	Faye Strutt; Jim Watters	
1965	Calgary	Susan Huehnergard; Paul Huehnergard	Alexis Shields; Chris Shields	Faye Strutt; Jim Watters	
1966	Peterborough	Susan Huehnergard; Paul Huehnergard	Alexis Shields; Chris Shields	Betty McKilligan; John McKilligan	
1967	Toronto	Betty McKilligan; John McKilligan	Alexis Shields; Chris Shields	Anna Forder; Richard Stephens	
1968	Vancouver	Betty McKilligan; John McKilligan	Anna Forder; Richard Stephens	Alexis Shields; Chris Shields	
1969	Toronto	Anna Forder; Richard Stephens	Mary Petrie; Robert McAvoy	Sandra Bezic; Val Bezic	
1970	Edmonton	Sandra Bezic; Val Bezic	Mary Petrie; Robert McAvoy	No other competitors	
1971	Winnipeg	Sandra Bezic; Val Bezic	Mary Petrie; John Hubbell	Marian Murray; Glenn Moore	
1972	London	Sandra Bezic; Val Bezic	Mary Petrie; John Hubbell	Marian Murray; Glenn Moore	
1973	Vancouver	Sandra Bezic; Val Bezic	Marian Murray; Glenn Moore	Linda Tasker; Allen Carson	
1974	Moncton	Sandra Bezic; Val Bezic	Marian Murray; Glenn Moore	Kathy Hutchinson; Jamie McGrigor	
1975	Quebec City	Candy Jones; Don Fraser	Kathy Hutchinson; Jamie McGrigor	Christine McBeth; Dennis Johnston	
1976	London	Candy Jones; Don Fraser	Cheri Pinner; Dennis Pinner	Karen Newton; Glenn Laframboise	
1977	Calgary	Cheri Pinner; Dennis Pinner	Janet Hominuke; Mark Hominuke	No other competitors	
1978	Victoria	Sherri Baier; Robin Cowan	Lee-Ann Jackson; Paul Mills	Susan Gowan; Eric Thomsen	
1979	Thunder Bay	Barbara Underhill; Paul Martini	Susan Gowan; Eric Thomsen	Lee-Ann Jackson; Bernard Souche	
1980	Kitchener	Barbara Underhill; Paul Martini	Lorri Baier; Lloyd Eisler	Becky Gough; Mark Rowsom	
1981	Halifax	Barbara Underhill; Paul Martini	Lorri Baier; Lloyd Eisler	Becky Gough; Mark Rowsom	
1982	Brandon	Barbara Underhill; Paul Martini	Lorri Baier; Lloyd Eisler	Becky Gough; Mark Rowsom	
1983	Montreal	Barbara Underhill; Paul Martini	Cynthia Coull; Mark Rowsom	Katherina Matousek; Lloyd Eisler	
1984	Regina	Katherina Matousek; Lloyd Eisler	Melinda Kunhegyi; Lyndon Johnston	Cynthia Coull; Mark Rowsom	
1985	Moncton	Cynthia Coull; Mark Rowsom	Melinda Kunhegyi; Lyndon Johnston	Christine Hough; Doug Ladret	
1986	North Bay	Cynthia Coull; Mark Rowsom	Denise Benning; Lyndon Johnston	Karen Westby; Lloyd Eisler	
1987	Ottawa	Cynthia Coull; Mark Rowsom	Denise Benning; Lyndon Johnston	Christine Hough; Doug Ladret	
1988	Victoria	Christine Hough; Doug Ladret	Isabelle Brasseur; Lloyd Eisler	Denise Benning; Lyndon Johnston	
1989	Chicoutimi	Isabelle Brasseur; Lloyd Eisler	Cindy Landry; Lyndon Johnston	Christine Hough; Doug Ladret	
1990	Sudbury	Cindy Landry; Lyndon Johnston	Christine Hough; Doug Ladret	Isabelle Brasseur; Lloyd Eisler	
1991	Saskatoon	Isabelle Brasseur; Lloyd Eisler	Christine Hough; Doug Ladret	Stacey Ball; Jean-Michel Bombardier	
1992	Moncton	Isabelle Brasseur; Lloyd Eisler	Christine Hough; Doug Ladret	Sherry Ball; Kris Wirtz	
1993	Hamilton	Isabelle Brasseur; Lloyd Eisler	Michelle Menzies; Jean-Michel Bombardier	Jodeyne Higgins; Sean Rice	
1994	Edmonton	Isabelle Brasseur; Lloyd Eisler	Kristy Sargeant; Kris Wirtz	Jamie Salé; Jason Turner	
1995	Halifax	Michelle Menzies; Jean-Michel Bombardier	Allison Gaylor; David Pelletier	Jodeyne Higgins; Sean Rice	
1996	Ottawa	Michelle Menzies; Jean-Michel Bombardier	Kristy Sargeant; Kris Wirtz	Marie-Claude Savard-Gagnon; Luc Bradet	
1997	Vancouver	Marie-Claude Savard-Gagnon; Luc Bradet	Kristy Sargeant; Kris Wirtz	Michelle Menzies; Jean-Michel Bombardier	
1998	Hamilton	Kristy Sargeant; Kris Wirtz	Marie-Claude Savard-Gagnon; Luc Bradet	Valerie Saurette; Jean-Sébastien Fecteau	
1999	Ottawa	Kristy Sargeant; Kris Wirtz	Jamie Salé; David Pelletier	Valerie Saurette; Jean-Sébastien Fecteau	
2000	Calgary	Jamie Salé; David Pelletier	Kristy Sargeant; Kris Wirtz	Valerie Saurette; Jean-Sébastien Fecteau	
2001	Winnipeg	Jamie Salé; David Pelletier	Kristy Sargeant; Kris Wirtz	Anabelle Langlois; Patrice Archetto	
2002	Hamilton	Jamie Salé; David Pelletier	Jacinthe Larivière; Lenny Faustino	Anabelle Langlois; Patrice Archetto	
2003	Saskatoon	Jacinthe Larivière; Lenny Faustino	Anabelle Langlois; Patrice Archetto	Elizabeth Putnam; Sean Wirtz	
2004	Edmonton	Valérie Marcoux; Craig Buntin	Anabelle Langlois; Patrice Archetto	Elizabeth Putnam; Sean Wirtz	
2005	London	Valérie Marcoux; Craig Buntin	Utako Wakamatsu; Jean-Sébastien Fecteau	Anabelle Langlois; Patrice Archetto	
2006	Ottawa	Valérie Marcoux; Craig Buntin	Jessica Dubé; Bryce Davison	Utako Wakamatsu; Jean-Sébastien Fecteau	
2007	Halifax	Jessica Dubé; Bryce Davison	Valérie Marcoux; Craig Buntin	Anabelle Langlois; Cody Hay	
2008	Vancouver	Anabelle Langlois; Cody Hay	Jessica Dubé; Bryce Davison	Meagan Duhamel; Craig Buntin	
2009	Saskatoon	Jessica Dubé; Bryce Davison	Meagan Duhamel; Craig Buntin	Mylène Brodeur; John Mattatall	
2010	London	Jessica Dubé; Bryce Davison	Anabelle Langlois; Cody Hay	Meagan Duhamel; Craig Buntin	
2011	Victoria	Kirsten Moore-Towers; Dylan Moscovitch	Meagan Duhamel; Eric Radford	Paige Lawrence; Rudi Swiegers	
2012	Moncton	Meagan Duhamel; Eric Radford	Jessica Dubé; Sébastien Wolfe	Paige Lawrence; Rudi Swiegers	
2013	Mississauga	Meagan Duhamel; Eric Radford	Kirsten Moore-Towers; Dylan Moscovitch	Paige Lawrence; Rudi Swiegers	
2014	Ottawa	Meagan Duhamel; Eric Radford	Kirsten Moore-Towers; Dylan Moscovitch	Paige Lawrence; Rudi Swiegers	
2015	Kingston	Meagan Duhamel; Eric Radford	Liubov Ilyushechkina; Dylan Moscovitch	Julianne Séguin; Charlie Bilodeau	
2016	Halifax	Meagan Duhamel; Eric Radford	Julianne Séguin; Charlie Bilodeau	Liubov Ilyushechkina; Dylan Moscovitch	
2017	Ottawa	Meagan Duhamel; Eric Radford	Liubov Ilyushechkina; Dylan Moscovitch	Kirsten Moore-Towers; Michael Marinaro	
2018	Vancouver	Meagan Duhamel; Eric Radford	Julianne Séguin; Charlie Bilodeau	Kirsten Moore-Towers; Michael Marinaro	
2019	Saint John	Kirsten Moore-Towers; Michael Marinaro	Evelyn Walsh; Trennt Michaud	Camille Ruest; Drew Wolfe	
2020	Mississauga	Kirsten Moore-Towers; Michael Marinaro	Evelyn Walsh; Trennt Michaud	Lubov Ilyushechkina; Charlie Bilodeau	
2021	Vancouver	Competition cancelled due to the COVID-19 pandemic			
2022	Ottawa	Kirsten Moore-Towers; Michael Marinaro	Evelyn Walsh; Trennt Michaud	Deanna Stellato-Dudek; Maxime Deschamps	
2023	Oshawa	Deanna Stellato-Dudek; Maxime Deschamps	Brooke McIntosh; Benjamin Mimar	Lia Pereira; Trennt Michaud	
2024	Calgary	Deanna Stellato-Dudek; Maxime Deschamps	Lia Pereira; Trennt Michaud	Kelly Ann Laurin; Loucas Éthier	
2025	Laval	Deanna Stellato-Dudek; Maxime Deschamps	Lia Pereira; Trennt Michaud	Kelly Ann Laurin; Loucas Éthier	
2026	Gatineau	Lia Pereira; Trennt Michaud	Deanna Stellato-Dudek; Maxime Deschamps	Kelly Ann Laurin; Loucas Éthier	

=== Ice dance ===
Senior ice dance event medallists
Year	Location	Gold	Silver	Bronze	Ref.
1947	Toronto	Margaret Roberts; Bruce Hyland	Joyce Perkins; William de Nance Jr.	Marnie Brereton; Richard McLaughlin	
1948	Calgary	Suzanne Morrow; Wallace Diestelmeyer	Joan Prince; Ronald Kinney	No other competitors	
1949	Ottawa	Joyce Perkins; Bruce Hyland	Pierrette Paquin; Donald Tobin	Joy Forsyth; Ronald Vincent	
1950	St. Catharines	Pierrette Paquin; Donald Tobin	Joy Forsyth; William de Nance Jr.	Frances Dafoe; Norris Bowden	
1951	Vancouver	Pierrette Paquin; Donald Tobin	Mary Diane Trimble; David Ross	Frances Dafoe; Norris Bowden	
1952	Oshawa	Frances Dafoe; Norris Bowden	Joyce Kornacher; William de Nance Jr.	Pierrette Paquin; Malcolm Wickson	
1953	Ottawa	Frances Abbott; David Ross	Patty Lou Montgomery; George Montgomery	Marion Wattie; Harry Ball	
1954	Calgary	Doreen Leech; Norman Walker	Geraldine Fenton; William McLachlan	Claudette Lacaille; Jeffrey Johnston	
1955	Toronto	Lindis Johnston; Jeffrey Johnston	Geraldine Fenton; Gordon Crossland	Beverley de Nance; William de Nance Jr.	
1956	Galt	Lindis Johnston; Jeffrey Johnston	Geraldine Fenton; William McLachlan	Beverley de Nance; William de Nance Jr.	
1957	Winnipeg	Geraldine Fenton; William McLachlan	Beverley Orr; Hugh Smith	Elaine Protheroe; William Trimble	
1958	Ottawa	Geraldine Fenton; William McLachlan	Beverley Orr; Hugh Smith	Svata Staroba; Mirek Staroba	
1959	Noranda	Geraldine Fenton; William McLachlan	Ann Martin; Edward Collins	Svata Staroba; Mirek Staroba	
1960	Regina	Virginia Thompson; William McLachlan	Ann Martin; Gilles Vanasse	Svata Staroba; Mirek Staroba	
1961	Lachine	Virginia Thompson; William McLachlan	Donna Lee Mitchell; John Mitchell	Paulette Doan; Kenneth Ormsby	
1962	Toronto	Virginia Thompson; William McLachlan	Donna Lee Mitchell; John Mitchell	Paulette Doan; Kenneth Ormsby	
1963	Edmonton	Paulette Doan; Kenneth Ormsby	Donna Lee Mitchell; John Mitchell	Carole Forrest; Kevin Lethbridge	
1964	North Bay	Paulette Doan; Kenneth Ormsby	Carole Forrest; Kevin Lethbridge	Marilyn Crawford; Blair Armitage	
1965	Calgary	Carole Forrest; Kevin Lethbridge	Lynn Matthews; Bryon Topping	Gail Snyder; Wayne Palmer	
1966	Peterborough	Carole Forrest; Kevin Lethbridge	Gail Snyder; Wayne Palmer	Judy Henderson; John Bailey	
1967	Toronto	Joni Graham; Don Phillips	Judy Henderson; John Bailey	Maureen Peever; Wayne Palmer	
1968	Vancouver	Joni Graham; Don Phillips	Donna Taylor; Bruce Lennie	Mary Church; Tom Falls	
1969	Toronto	Donna Taylor; Bruce Lennie	Mary Church; Tom Falls	Hazel Pike; Phillip Boskill	
1970	Edmonton	Mary Church; David Sutton	Hazel Pike; Phillip Boskill	Louise Lind; Barry Soper	
1971	Winnipeg	Louise Soper; Barry Soper	Mary Church; David Sutton	Brenda Sandys; James Holden	
1972	London	Louise Soper; Barry Soper	Barbara Berezowski; David Porter	Linda Roe; Michael Bradley	
1973	Vancouver	Louise Soper; Barry Soper	Barbara Berezowski; David Porter	Linda Roe; Michael Bradley	
1974	Moncton	Louise Soper; Barry Soper	Barbara Berezowski; David Porter	Linda Roe; Michael Bradley	
1975	Quebec City	Barbara Berezowski; David Porter	Susan Carscallen; Eric Gillies	Shelley MacLeod; Bob Knapp	
1976	London	Barbara Berezowski; David Porter	Susan Carscallen; Eric Gillies	Lorna Wighton; John Dowding	
1977	Calgary	Susan Carscallen; Eric Gillies	Lorna Wighton; John Dowding	Debbie Young; Greg Young	
1978	Victoria	Lorna Wighton; John Dowding	Patricia Fletcher; Michael de la Penotiere	Marie McNeil; Rob McCall	
1979	Thunder Bay	Lorna Wighton; John Dowding	Patricia Fletcher; Michael de la Penotiere	Marie McNeil; Rob McCall	
1980	Kitchener	Lorna Wighton; John Dowding	Marie McNeil; Rob McCall	Gina Aucoin; Hans Peter Ponikau	
1981	Halifax	Marie McNeil; Rob McCall	Kelly Johnson; Kris Barber	Joanne French; John Thomas	
1982	Brandon	Tracy Wilson; Rob McCall	Kelly Johnson; Kris Barber	Joanne French; John Thomas	
1983	Montreal	Tracy Wilson; Rob McCall	Kelly Johnson; John Thomas	Karyn Garossino; Rod Garossino	
1984	Regina	Tracy Wilson; Rob McCall	Kelly Johnson; John Thomas	Karyn Garossino; Rod Garossino	
1985	Moncton	Tracy Wilson; Rob McCall	Karyn Garossino; Rod Garossino	Isabelle Duchesnay; Paul Duchesnay	
1986	North Bay	Tracy Wilson; Rob McCall	Karyn Garossino; Rod Garossino	Jo-Anne Borlase; Scott Chalmers	
1987	Ottawa	Tracy Wilson; Rob McCall	Karyn Garossino; Rod Garossino	Jo-Anne Borlase; Scott Chalmers	
1988	Victoria	Tracy Wilson; Rob McCall	Karyn Garossino; Rod Garossino	Melanie Cole; Michael Farrington	
1989	Chicoutimi	Karyn Garossino; Rod Garossino	Michelle McDonald; Mark Mitchell	Jo-Anne Borlase; Martin Smith	
1990	Sudbury	Jo-Anne Borlase; Martin Smith	Michelle McDonald; Mark Mitchell	Jacqueline Petr; Mark Janoschak	
1991	Saskatoon	Michelle McDonald; Martin Smith	Jacqueline Petr; Mark Janoschak	Penny Mann; Juan-Carlos Noria	
1992	Moncton	Jacqueline Petr; Mark Janoschak	Penny Mann; Juan-Carlos Noria	Michelle McDonald; Martin Smith	
1993	Hamilton	Shae-Lynn Bourne; Victor Kraatz	Penny Mann; Juan-Carlos Noria	Jacqueline Petr; Mark Janoschak	
1994	Edmonton	Shae-Lynn Bourne; Victor Kraatz	Jennifer Boyce; Michel Brunet	Martine Patenaude; Eric Massé	
1995	Halifax	Shae-Lynn Bourne; Victor Kraatz	Jennifer Boyce; Michel Brunet	Janet Emerson; Steve Kavanagh	
1996	Ottawa	Shae-Lynn Bourne; Victor Kraatz	Chantal Lefebvre; Michel Brunet	Janet Emerson; Steve Kavanagh	
1997	Vancouver	Shae-Lynn Bourne; Victor Kraatz	Chantal Lefebvre; Michel Brunet	Megan Wing; Aaron Lowe	
1998	Hamilton	Shae-Lynn Bourne; Victor Kraatz	Chantal Lefebvre; Michel Brunet	Megan Wing; Aaron Lowe	
1999	Ottawa	Shae-Lynn Bourne; Victor Kraatz	Chantal Lefebvre; Michel Brunet	Marie-France Dubreuil; Patrice Lauzon	
2000	Calgary	Marie-France Dubreuil; Patrice Lauzon	Megan Wing; Aaron Lowe	Josée Piché; Pascal Denis	
2001	Winnipeg	Shae-Lynn Bourne; Victor Kraatz	Marie-France Dubreuil; Patrice Lauzon	Megan Wing; Aaron Lowe	
2002	Hamilton	Shae-Lynn Bourne; Victor Kraatz	Marie-France Dubreuil; Patrice Lauzon	Megan Wing; Aaron Lowe	
2003	Saskatoon	Shae-Lynn Bourne; Victor Kraatz	Marie-France Dubreuil; Patrice Lauzon	Megan Wing; Aaron Lowe	
2004	Edmonton	Marie-France Dubreuil; Patrice Lauzon	Megan Wing; Aaron Lowe	Chantal Lefebvre; Arseniy Markov	
2005	London	Marie-France Dubreuil; Patrice Lauzon	Megan Wing; Aaron Lowe	Chantal Lefebvre; Arseniy Markov	
2006	Ottawa	Marie-France Dubreuil; Patrice Lauzon	Megan Wing; Aaron Lowe	Tessa Virtue; Scott Moir	
2007	Halifax	Marie-France Dubreuil; Patrice Lauzon	Tessa Virtue; Scott Moir	Kaitlyn Weaver; Andrew Poje	
2008	Vancouver	Tessa Virtue; Scott Moir	Kaitlyn Weaver; Andrew Poje	Allie Hann-McCurdy; Michael Coreno	
2009	Saskatoon	Tessa Virtue; Scott Moir	Vanessa Crone; Paul Poirier	Kaitlyn Weaver; Andrew Poje	
2010	London	Tessa Virtue; Scott Moir	Vanessa Crone; Paul Poirier	Kaitlyn Weaver; Andrew Poje	
2011	Victoria	Vanessa Crone; Paul Poirier	Kaitlyn Weaver; Andrew Poje	Alexandra Paul; Mitchell Islam	
2012	Moncton	Tessa Virtue; Scott Moir	Kaitlyn Weaver; Andrew Poje	Piper Gilles; Paul Poirier	
2013	Mississauga	Tessa Virtue; Scott Moir	Piper Gilles; Paul Poirier	Nicole Orford; Thomas Williams	
2014	Ottawa	Tessa Virtue; Scott Moir	Kaitlyn Weaver; Andrew Poje	Alexandra Paul; Mitchell Islam	
2015	Kingston	Kaitlyn Weaver; Andrew Poje	Piper Gilles; Paul Poirier	Alexandra Paul; Mitchell Islam	
2016	Halifax	Kaitlyn Weaver; Andrew Poje	Piper Gilles; Paul Poirier	Elisabeth Paradis; Francois-Xavier Ouellette	
2017	Ottawa	Tessa Virtue; Scott Moir	Kaitlyn Weaver; Andrew Poje	Piper Gilles; Paul Poirier	
2018	Vancouver	Tessa Virtue; Scott Moir	Piper Gilles; Paul Poirier	Kaitlyn Weaver; Andrew Poje	
2019	Saint John	Kaitlyn Weaver; Andrew Poje	Piper Gilles; Paul Poirier	Laurence Fournier Beaudry; Nikolaj Sørensen	
2020	Mississauga	Piper Gilles; Paul Poirier	Marjorie Lajoie; Zachary Lagha	Carolane Soucisse; Shane Firus	
2021	Vancouver	Competition cancelled due to the COVID-19 pandemic			
2022	Ottawa	Piper Gilles; Paul Poirier	Laurence Fournier Beaudry; Nikolaj Sørensen	Marjorie Lajoie; Zachary Lagha	
2023	Oshawa	Laurence Fournier Beaudry; Nikolaj Sørensen	Marjorie Lajoie; Zachary Lagha	Marie-Jade Lauriault; Romain Le Gac	
2024	Calgary	Piper Gilles; Paul Poirier	Marie-Jade Lauriault; Romain Le Gac	Alicia Fabbri; Paul Ayer	
2025	Laval	Piper Gilles; Paul Poirier	Marjorie Lajoie; Zachary Lagha	Alicia Fabbri; Paul Ayer	
2026	Gatineau	Piper Gilles; Paul Poirier	Marjorie Lajoie; Zachary Lagha	Marie-Jade Lauriault; Romain Le Gac	

=== Synchronized skating ===
Synchronized event medallists
Year	Location	Gold	Silver	Bronze	Ref.
For results prior to 2023, see Canadian Synchronized Skating Championships
2023	Oshawa	NEXXICE	Nova	Les Suprêmes	
2024	Calgary	Les Suprêmes	Nova	NEXXICE	
2025	Laval	Les Suprêmes	Nova	NEXXICE	
2026	Gatineau	Les Suprêmes	Nova	NEXXICE	

== Discontinued events ==
These events were held only in the years indicated. The waltz and tenstep were retired in 1959, while four skating continued intermittently until 1997.

=== Four skating ===
Four skating medallists
Year	Location	Gold	Silver	Bronze	Ref.
1912	Ottawa	Isobel Sherwood; R.B. Veits; Ada Davidson; Philip Chrysler	Jeanne Chevalier; Allen Richardson; Anne Ewan; S.D. Piddington	No other competitors	
1913	Ottawa	Dorothy White; R.B. Veits; Isobel Sherwood; C.J. Allen	Beatrice McDougall; Norman Scott; Winnifred Tait; Charles O'Brien	No other competitors	
1914	Ottawa	Dolly Goodeve; O.G. McIntyre; Betty Masson; A.C. Ross	Beatrice McDougall; Alan Richardson; Winnifred Tait; Charles O'Brien	No other competitors	
1915–19	No competitions due to World War I				
1920	Montreal	Jeanne Chevalier; J. Cecil McDougall; Winnifred Tait; Norman Scott	Rachel Cavendish; Gordon McLennan; Florence Wilson; P.J. Wood	No other competitors	
1921	Montreal	Jeanne Chevalier; Allan Howard; Winnifred Tait; Norman Gregory	Rachel Cavendish; J.R. Booth Jr.; Lily McGee; Chauncey Bangs	Elizabeth Blair; C.J. Allan; Florence Wilson; P.J. Wood	
1922	Ottawa	Elizabeth Blair; C.R. Morphy; Florence Wilson; Philip Chrysler	Sydney Pepler; Frankford Rogers; Katherine Capreol; Melville Rogers	Mrs. R.O. Johnson; Harold Featherstonhaugh; Thea Cockburn; John Scott	
1923	Toronto	Elizabeth Blair; C.R. Morphy; Florence Wilson; Philip Chrysler	Amy Suckling; Gerald Suckling; Jeanette Rathburn; H.F. Rice	Katherine Capreol; Melville Rogers; Sydney Pepler; Clifford Sifton	
1924	Montreal	Elizabeth Blair; C.R. Morphy; Marion MacDougall; Henry Gill	Doris Sifton; Clifford Sifton; Jean Burritt; David Blain	No other competitors	
1925	Ottawa	Edith Secord; C.R. Morphy; Marion MacDougall; Henry Gill	Margot Barclay; Allan Howard; Marjorie Annable; Norman Gregory	Jeannette Rathburn; Errol Morson; Mrs. M. Grant; Hugh Tarbox	
1926	Toronto	Cecil Smith; Jack Eastwood; Maude Smith; Montgomery Wilson	Marion MacDougall; Chauncey Bangs; Edith Secord; Henry Gill	No other competitors	
1927	Montreal	Cecil Smith; Jack Eastwood; Maude Smith; Montgomery Wilson	Frances Claudet; Paul Belcourt; Katherine Lopdell; W.J. Hose	Margot Barclay; R. Bolton; Dorothy Benson; Norman Gregory	
1928	Toronto	Frances Claudet; Paul Belcourt; Katherine Lopdell; W.J. Hose	No other competitors		
1929	Ottawa	Veronica Clarke; John Machado; Margaret Henry; Stewart Reburn	Frances Claudet; Melville Rogers; Katherine Lopdell; Guy Owen	Cecil Smith; Jack Eastwood; Maude Smith; H.W.D. Foster	
1930	Winnipeg	Mary Littlejohn; G.E. Beament; Elizabeth Fisher; Hubert Sprott	Maude Porteous; C.W. Vincent; Margaret Winks; D.H. Bain	No other competitors	
1931	Toronto	Mary Littlejohn; Hubert Sprott; Elizabeth Fisher; Jack Hose	Cecil Smith; Stewart Reburn; Maude Smith; Jack Eastwood	Frances Claudet; Guy Owen; Katherine Lopdell; Melville Rogers	
1932	Toronto	Veronica Clarke; John Machado; Louise Bertram; Stewart Reburn	Mrs. Elmore Davis; Melville Rogers; Prudence Holbrook; Guy Owen	Mary Littlejohn; Jack Hose; Elizabeth Fisher; Hubert Sprott	
1933	Montreal	Mrs. Elmore Davis; Melville Rogers; Prudence Holbrook; Guy Owen	Lorraine Hopkins; Hubert Sprott; Elizabeth Fisher; Montgomery Wilson	No other competitors	
1934	Toronto	Mrs. Elmore Davis; Melville Rogers; Prudence Holbrook; Guy Owen	Louise Bertram; Stewart Reburn; Margaret Henry; Hubert Sprott	Maude Smith; Osborne Colson; Cecil Smith; Jack Eastwood	
1935	Ottawa	Margaret Davis; Guy Owen; Prudence Holbrook; Melville Rogers	Margaret Merry; Stewart Reburn; Louise Bertram; Hubert Sprott	Margaret Jenkins; Lewis Elkin; Betty Riley; Jack Kilgour	
1936	Toronto	Margaret Davis; Guy Owen; Prudence Holbrook; Melville Rogers	Elizabeth Fisher; Ralph McCreath; Margaret Merry; Hubert Sprott	Naomi Slater; Jack Hose; Aidrie Cruikshank; Donald Cruikshank	
1937	Montreal	Mrs. Elmore Davis; Melville Rogers; Prudence Holbrook; Guy Owen	Naomi Slater; Jack Hose; Aidrie Cruikshank; Donald Cruikshank	Gillian Watson; Hubert Sprott; Ruth Hall; Sandy McKechnie	
1938	Winnipeg	Constance Wilson-Samuel; Montgomery Wilson; Veronica Clarke; Ralph McCreath	Aidrie Cruikshank; Donald Cruikshank; Naomi Slater; Robert Surtees	No other competitors	
1939	Toronto	Gillian Watson; Sandy McKechnie; Ruth Hall; Donald Gilchrist	No other competitors		
1940	Ottawa	Ruth Hall; William Calder; Elizabeth Chambers; John Milson	No other competitors		
1941	Montreal	Therese McCarthy; Donald Gilchrist; Virginia Wilson; Michael Kirby	No other competitors		
1942	Winnipeg	Eleanor O'Meara; Donald Gilchrist; Virginia Wilson; Michael Kirby	No other competitors		
1943–44	Toronto	No fours competitions due to World War II			
1945–50	No fours competitions held				
1951	Vancouver	Pat Spray; David Spalding; Gayle Wakely; Norman Walker	Connie Cantlon; Brian Power; Audrie Downie; Charles Murphy	No other competitors	
1952–54	No fours competitions held				
1955	Toronto	Peggy Lount; Ian Campbell; Jackie Oldham; Clifford Spearing	Mary Claire Moore; Kenneth Ormsby; Judith Saunders; Bryan Irwin	No other competitors	
1956–58	No fours competitions held				
1959	Noranda	Sharon Davis; Dean Akins; Clare Snowdy; Larry Bennett	Paulette Doan; John Caughell; Ruth Fitzgibbon; Rae Warden	No other competitors	
1960–61	No fours competitions held				
1962	Toronto	Gertrude Desjardins; Maurice Lafrance; Elinor Flack; Phillip McCordic	Bonnie Fuoco; Vernon Hartt; Dale Hutchinson; Raymond Troyer	No other competitors	
1963	No fours competition held				
1964	North Bay	Bonnie Anderson; David Dore; Laura Maybee; Gregory Folk	Barbara Graham; Wayne Palmer; Gail Snyder; Thomas Monypenny	No other competitors	
1965–80	No fours competitions held				
1981	Brandon	Melinda Kunhegyi; Lyndon Johnston; Becky Gough; Mark Rowsom	Susan Kinal; David Howe; Cheryl Susick; William Thompson	Lynn Frasson; Mark Bystreck; Lawrie Emerson; Sidney Shanks	
1982–83	No fours competitions held				
1984	Regina	Katerina Matousek; Lloyd Eisler; Melinda Kunhegyi; Lyndon Johnston	Cynthia Coull; Mark Rowsom; Laureen Collin; David Howe	No other competitors	
1985	Moncton	Christine Hough; Doug Ladret; Melinda Kunhegyi; Lyndon Johnston	Cynthia Coull; Mark Rowsom; Penny Schultz; Scott Grover	Laureen Collin; David Howe; Brooke Petersmeyer; Jim Blackburn	
1986	North Bay	Denise Benning; Lyndon Johnston; Isabelle Kourie; Guy Trudeau	Cynthia Coull; Mark Rowsom; Christine Hough; Doug Ladret	Barbara Martin; John Penticost; Karen Westby; Lloyd Eisler	
1987	Ottawa	Denise Benning; Lyndon Johnston; Laureen Collin; John Penticost	Christine Hough; Doug Ladret; Michelle Menzies; Kevin Wheeler	Cynthia Coull; Mark Rowsom; Melanie Gaylor; Lee Barkell	
1988	Victoria	Denise Benning; Lyndon Johnston; Christine Hough; Doug Ladret	Melanie Gaylor; Lee Barkell; Michelle Menzies; Kevin Wheeler	Laureen Collin; John Penticost; Lori Rissling; Alan Kerslake	
1989	Chicoutimi	Patricia MacNeil; Cory Watson; Christine Hough; Doug Ladret	Cindy Landry; Lyndon Johnston; Jodi Dawson; David Wood	Michelle Menzies; Kevin Wheeler; Alison Hughes; Jim Blackburn	
1990	Sudbury	Christine Hough; Doug Ladret; Cindy Landry; Lyndon Johnston	Patricia MacNeil; Cory Watson; Michelle Menzies; Kevin Wheeler	No other competitors	
1991	Saskatoon	Stacey Ball; Jean-Michel Bombardier; Isabelle Brasseur; Lloyd Eisler	Christine Hough; Doug Ladret; Michelle Menzies; Kevin Wheeler	Krista Coady; Brian Geddels; Janice Yeck; Scott MacDonald	
1992	Moncton	Stacey Ball; Jean-Michel Bombardier; Isabelle Brasseur; Lloyd Eisler	Christine Hough; Doug Ladret; Michelle Menzies; Kevin Wheeler	Janice Yeck; Scott MacDonald; Jodeyne Higgins; Sean Rice	
1993	Hamilton	Jodi Barnes; Rob Williams; Jodeyne Higgins; Sean Rice	Tiina Murr; Cory Watson; Alison Purkiss; Scott MacDonald	Julie Leithead; Jonathon Allen; Shannon Robb; Scott Cornfoot	
1994	Edmonton	Jodeyne Higgins; Sean Rice; Alison Purkiss; Scott MacDonald	Penny Papaioannou; Rob Williams; Shannon Robb; Scott Cornfoot	Tiina Murr; Cory Watson; Samantha Marchant; Chad Hawse	
1995	Halifax	Jodeyne Higgins; Sean Rice; Alison Purkiss; Scott MacDonald	Samantha Marchant; Chad Hawse; Shannon Robb; Scott Cornfoot	No other competitors	
1996	Ottawa	Jodeyne Higgins; Sean Rice; Alison Purkiss; Scott MacDonald	Samantha Marchant; Chad Hawse; Shannon Robb; Scott Cornfoot	No other competitors	
1997	Vancouver	Allison Gaylor; David Pelletier; Nadine Prenovost; David Annecca	Jodeyne Higgins; Sean Rice; Melissa Shields; Trevor Buttenham	Samantha Marchant; Chad Hawse; Alison Forster; Conrad Seamen	

=== Tenstep ===
In 1938 and 1946, skaters performed a fourteenstep instead of a tenstep.

Tenstep medallists
Year	Location	Gold	Silver	Bronze	Ref.
1935	Ottawa	Louise Bertram; Stewart Reburn	No other competitors		
1936	Toronto	Veronica Clarke; Jack Eastwood	No other competitors		
1937	Montreal	Veronica Clarke; Ralph McCreath	Aidrie Cruikshank; Donald Cruikshank	Louise Bertram; Osborne Colson	
1938	Winnipeg	Veronica Clarke; Ralph McCreath	Janet Sweatman; Fraser Sweatman	Aidrie Cruikshank; Donald Cruikshank	
1939	Toronto	Janet Sweatman; Fraser Sweatman	Aidrie Cruikshank; Donald Cruikshank	No other competitors	
1940	Ottawa	Mrs. Elmore Davis; Melville Rogers	Eleanor O'Meara; Donald Gilchrist	No other competitors	
1941	Montreal	Norah McCarthy; Sandy McKechnie	Constance Wilson-Samuel; Gordon Jeffrey	Audrey Joyce; Norman Gregory	
1942	Winnipeg	Eleanor O'Meara; Donald Gilchrist	Evelyn Rogers; George McCullough	No other competitors	
1943–44	Toronto	No tenstep competitions due to World War II			
1945	Toronto	Olga Bernyk; Alex Fulton	Gloria Lillico; William de Nance Jr.	Virginia Wilson; Will White Jr.	
1946	Toronto	Marnie Brereton; Richard McLaughlin	Gloria Lillico; William de Nance Jr.	Joyce Perkins; Wallace Diestelmeyer	
1947	Toronto	Margaret Roberts; Bruce Hyland	Joyce Perkins; William de Nance Jr.	Marnie Brereton; Richard McLaughlin	
1948	Calgary	Suzanne Morrow; Wallace Distelmeyer	Joan Prince; Ronald Kinney	No other competitors	
1949	Ottawa	Pierrette Paquin; Donald Tobin	Joyce Perkins; Bruce Hyland	Joy Forsyth; Ronald Vincent	
1950	St. Catharines	Joy Forsyth; William de Nance Jr.	Pierrette Paquin; Donald Tobin	Frances Dafoe; Norris Bowden	
1951	Vancouver	Mary Diane Trimble; David Ross	Pierrette Paquin; Donald Tobin	Frances Dafoe; Norris Bowden	
1952	Oshawa	Frances Dafoe; Norris Bowden	Joyce Kornacher; William de Nance Jr.	Pierrette Paquin; Malcolm Wickson	
1953	Ottawa	Frances Dafoe; Norris Bowden	Geraldine Fenton; Glen Skuce	Claudette Lacaille; Jeffery Johnston	
1954	Calgary	Geraldine Fenton; William McLachlan	Doreen Leech; Norman Walker	Claudette Lacaille; Jeffery Johnston	
1955	Toronto	Lindis Johnston; Jeffery Johnston	Heather West; William McLachlan	Beverley de Nance; William de Nance Jr.	
1956	Galt	Geraldine Fenton; William McLachlan	Lindis Johnston; Jeffery Johnston	Beverley Orr; Hugh Smith	
1957	Winnipeg	Geraldine Fenton; William McLachlan	Beverley Orr; Hugh Smith	Elaine Protheroe; William Trimble	
1958	Ottawa	Geraldine Fenton; William McLachlan	Beverley Orr; Hugh Smith	Ann Martin; Edward Collins	
1959	Noranda	Geraldine Fenton; William McLachlan	Svata Staroba; Mirek Staroba	Judith Saunders; Kenneth Ormsby	

=== Waltz ===
Waltz medallists
Year	Location	Gold	Silver	Bronze	Ref.
1935	Ottawa	Naomi Slater; George Bleakney	No other competitors		
1936	Toronto	Aidrie Cruikshank; Donald Cruikshank	No other competitors		
1937	Montreal	Aidrie Cruikshank; Donald Cruikshank	Veronica Clarke; Ralph McCreath	Margaret Symington; Charles Askwith	
1938	Winnipeg	Janet Sweatman; Fraser Sweatman	Aidrie Cruikshank; Donald Cruikshank	Constance Wilson-Samuel; Montgomery Wilson	
1939	Toronto	Aidrie Cruikshank; Donald Cruikshank	Constance Wilson-Samuel; Montgomery Wilson	No other competitors	
1940	Ottawa	Aidrie Cruikshank; Donald Cruikshank	Margaret Davis; Melville Rogers	No other competitors	
1941	Montreal	Helen Malcolm; Joe Geisler	Norah McCarthy; Sandy McKechnie	Audrey Joyce; Norman Gregory	
1942	Winnipeg	Evelyn Rogers; George McCullough	Eleanor O'Meara; Donald Gilchrist	No other competitors	
1943–44	Toronto	No waltz competitions due to World War II			
1945	Toronto	Gloria Lillico; William de Nance Jr.	Suzanne Morrow; Norris Bowden	Virginia Wilson; Will White Jr.	
1946	Toronto	Gloria Lillico; William de Nance Jr.	Joyce Perkins; Wallace Distelmeyer	Jacqueline Byers; Gordon Paul	
1947	Toronto	Margaret Roberts; Bruce Hyland	Joyce Perkins; William de Nance Jr.	Marnie Brereton; Richard McLaughlin	
1948	Calgary	Suzanne Morrow; Wallace Distelmeyer	Joan Prince; Ronald Kinney	No other competitors	
1949	Ottawa	Joyce Perkins; Bruce Hyland	Pierrette Paquin; Donald Tobin	Joy Forsyth; Ronald Vincent	
1950	St. Catharines	Frances Dafoe; Norris Bowden	Joy Forsyth; William de Nance Jr.	Pierrette Paquin; Donald Tobin	
1951	Vancouver	Frances Dafoe; Norris Bowden	Pierrette Paquin; Donald Tobin	Mary Diane Trimble; David Ross	
1952	Oshawa	Frances Dafoe; Norris Bowden	Joyce Kornacher; William de Nance Jr.	Pierrette Paquin; Malcolm Wickson	
1953	Ottawa	Frances Dafoe; Norris Bowden	Frances Abbott; David Ross	Geraldine Fenton; Glen Skuce	
1954	Calgary	Geraldine Fenton; William McLachlan	Doreen Leech; Norman Walker	Claudette Lacaille; Jeffery Johnston	
1955	Toronto	Beverley de Nance; William de Nance Jr.	Geraldine Fenton; Gordon Crossland	Lindis Johnston; Jeffery Johnston	
1956	Galt	Elaine Protheroe; William Trimble	Geraldine Fenton; William McLachlan	No other competitors	
1957	Winnipeg	Geraldine Fenton; William McLachlan	Beverley Orr; Hugh Smith	Elaine Protheroe; William Trimble	
1958	Ottawa	Geraldine Fenton; William McLachlan	Beverley Orr; Hugh Smith	Ann Martin; Edward Collins	
1959	Noranda	Geraldine Fenton; William McLachlan	Ann Martin; Edward Collins	Svata Staroba; Mirek Staroba	

== Records ==
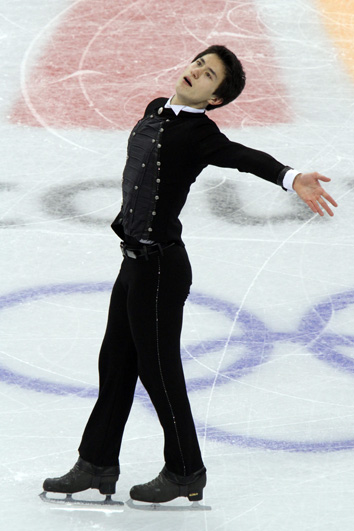
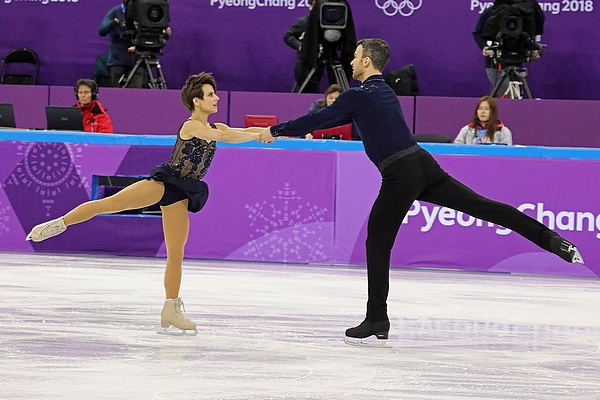
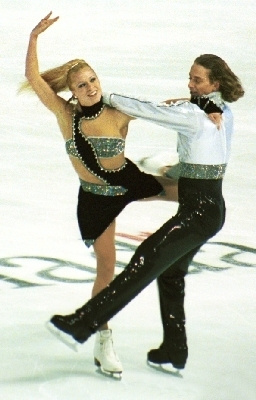
From left to right: Patrick Chan won ten Canadian Championship titles in men's singles; Meagan Duhamel and Eric Radford won seven Canadian Championship titles in pair skating; Shae-Lynn Bourne and Victor Kraatz won ten Canadian Championship titles in ice dance.

Records
Discipline	Most championship titles			
Discipline	Skater(s)	No.	Years	Ref.
Men's singles	Patrick Chan	10	2008–14; 2016–18	
Women's singles	Constance Wilson-Samuel	9	1924; 1927; 1929–35	
Pairs	Meagan Duhamel; Eric Radford	7	2012–18	
Ice dance	Shae-Lynn Bourne; Victor Kraatz	10	1993–99; 2001–03	

== Works cited ==
- Hines, James R. (2006). Figure Skating: A History. University of Illinois Press. ISBN 978-0-252-07286-4.
- Stevens, Ryan (2025). The Almanac of Canadian Figure Skating (2nd ed.). Halifax, Nova Scotia. ISBN 979-8-362-03096-4.
