= Karen Preston =

Canadian figure skater

Personal information
- Full name: Karen Elizabeth Preston
- Born: July 8, 1971 (age 55) Toronto, Ontario, Canada
- Height: 1.57 m (5 ft 2 in)

Figure skating career
- Country: Canada
- Coach: Ellen Burka, Osborne Colson, Wallace Diestelmeyer, Louis Stong
- Skating club: Toronto Cricket, Skating and Curling Club
- Retired: 1994

Karen Elizabeth Preston (born July 8, 1971) is a Canadian former competitive figure skater. She is the 1992 Grand Prix International de Paris silver medallist, a two-time Skate Canada International bronze medallist, a two-time (1989, 1992) Canadian national champion, and the 1987 Blue Swords Junior champion. She finished in the top ten at two World Championships and the 1992 Winter Olympics in Albertville.

== Personal life ==
Preston was born on July 8, 1971, in Toronto, Ontario. She attended Erindale Secondary School in Mississauga. She has two children, Lindsay (born c. 2004) and Ryan (born c. 2007), and became a naturalized U.S. citizen during her time in the United States.

== Career ==
Preston joined the Toronto Cricket, Skating and Curling Club (TCSCC) when she was nine years old.

She was awarded gold at the 1987 Blue Swords in East Germany. In the 1988–89 season, she won her first senior national title, ahead of Charlene Wong, and went on to compete at the 1989 World Championships in Paris, where she finished 11th.

Preston finished just off the national podium, in fourth place, during the next two seasons but received the bronze medal at the 1990 Nations Cup in Gelsenkirchen, Germany.

Preston began the 1991–92 season with a bronze medal at the 1991 Skate Canada International and went on to win her second national title, outscoring Josée Chouinard for gold. Both were selected to represent Canada at the 1992 Winter Olympics in Albertville. In France, Preston placed 12th in the short program, 8th in the free skate, and 8th overall, just ahead of Chouinard. Concluding her season, she finished 9th at the 1992 World Championships in Oakland, California.

The following season, she was awarded silver at the 1992 Grand Prix International de Paris, behind Surya Bonaly of France. She took silver behind Chouinard at the Canadian Championships and placed 8th at the 1993 World Championships in Prague.

In the 1993–94 season, Preston won bronze medals at the 1993 Skate Canada International and Canadian Championships. Ranked third behind Chouinard and Susan Humphreys, she did not make Canada's team to the 1994 Winter Olympics. During her competitive career, her coaches included Ellen Burka, Osborne Colson, Wally Diestelmeyer, and Louis Stong.

Preston coached in Connecticut, Florida, and Ann Arbor, Michigan, before joining the coaching staff at the TCSCC and Canadian Ice Academy in Toronto.

== Competitive highlights ==
International
Event	86–87	87–88	88–89	89–90	90–91	91–92	92–93	93–94
Olympics						8th		
Worlds			11th			9th	8th	
Goodwill Games					4th			
Internat. de Paris			5th				2nd	
Nations Cup					3rd			
NHK Trophy						4th		7th
Skate America			6th		8th			
Skate Canada						3rd		3rd
International: Junior
Blue Swords		1st						
National
Canadian Champ.	3rd N	3rd J	1st	4th	4th	1st	2nd	3rd
Levels: N = Novice; J = Junior
