= Roger Wickson (figure skater) =

Canadian figure skater

- Born: May 2, 1927; British Columbia, Canada
- Died: June 6, 1985 (aged 58); British Columbia, Canada
- Occupations: Figure skater, figure skating judge

Roger J. Wickson (May 2, 1927 – June 6, 1985) was a Canadian figure skater from Vancouver. He was the 1949 and 1950 national champion.

== Early life and education ==
Wickson was from Crescent Beach near Vancouver, the son of John Alfred Wickson and Gladys Emma Wickson. Mary Rose Thacker was one of his skating coaches. He attended the University of British Columbia.

== Skating career ==
In 1942, as a teenager, he was the British Columbia senior champion, and one of the only skaters to perform the cantilever spread eagle element. In 1944, as a member of the Connaught Club in Vancouver, he was the Canadian men's junior singles champion, and won the Howard Trophy. He was the 1949 and 1950 national champion. In 1951, he lost his national championship to Peter Firstbrook. In 1960 and 1961 he competed in pairs skating with Susan Mann as his partner, and he judged figure skating events.

== Results ==
Competition	1944	1946	1948	1949	1950	1951
World Championships					8th	
Canadian Championships	1st J	3rd	2nd	1st	1st	2nd

== Death ==
Wickson died in 1985, in Crescent Beach, survived by his mother and two brothers.
