= Peter Dunfield =

Canadian figure skater

Personal information
- Born: September 1931
- Died: May 25, 2014 (aged 82) Seattle, Washington, U.S.

Figure skating career
- Country: Canada
- Skating club: Toronto SC; Gloucester Skating Club
Medal record
Representing Canada
Fours' figure skating
North American Championships
Silver medal – second place	1949 Philadelphia	Fours

Peter Dunfield (c. 1931 – May 25, 2014) was a Canadian figure skater and coach. He competed in four skating, winning the 1949 North American silver medal, and single skating. He is best known for coaching Elizabeth Manley to the 1988 Olympic silver medal.

== Career ==
Dunfield competed in four skating with partners Mary Kenner, Peter Firstbrook, and Vera Smith. The group won the silver medal at the 1949 North American Championships.

As a single skater, Dunfield won the Canadian national junior title in 1951 and bronze on the senior level in 1952 and 1953. He was sent to the 1953 World Championships in Davos, Switzerland and the 1954 World Championships in Oslo, Norway, placing eighth both times.

From the early 1960s, Dunfield coached with his wife in New York City at the Sky Rink. When the rink closed around 1983, they moved to the Gloucester Skating Club in Orleans, Ontario. His students included:

- Elizabeth Manley (from 1983 to 1988), 1988 Olympic silver medalist.
- Yuka Sato (from age 16 to 21)
- Charlene Wong (from 1986 to 1990)
- Melissa Militano / Mark Militano
- Vivian Joseph / Ronald Joseph, 1964 Olympic bronze medalists.
- Scott Allen
- Angela Derochie
- Vera Wang

Dunfield retired from coaching in the late 1990s. He was inducted into the Canadian Figure Skating Hall of Fame in 2001.

== Personal life ==
Dunfield was married to American skater and coach Sonya Klopfer, with whom he had two sons. He died of a lung ailment in his sleep in Seattle, Washington, at the age of 82 on May 25, 2014.

== Competitive highlights ==
=== Singles career ===
International
Event	1950	1951	1952	1953	1954
World Championships				8th	8th
North American Championships				5th	
National
Canadian Championships	2nd J.	1st J.	3rd	3rd	
J. = Junior level

=== Fours career ===
(with Mary Kenner, Vera Smith, and Peter Firstbrook)

International
Event	1949
North American Championships	2nd
