= Louise Bertram =

Canadian figure skater

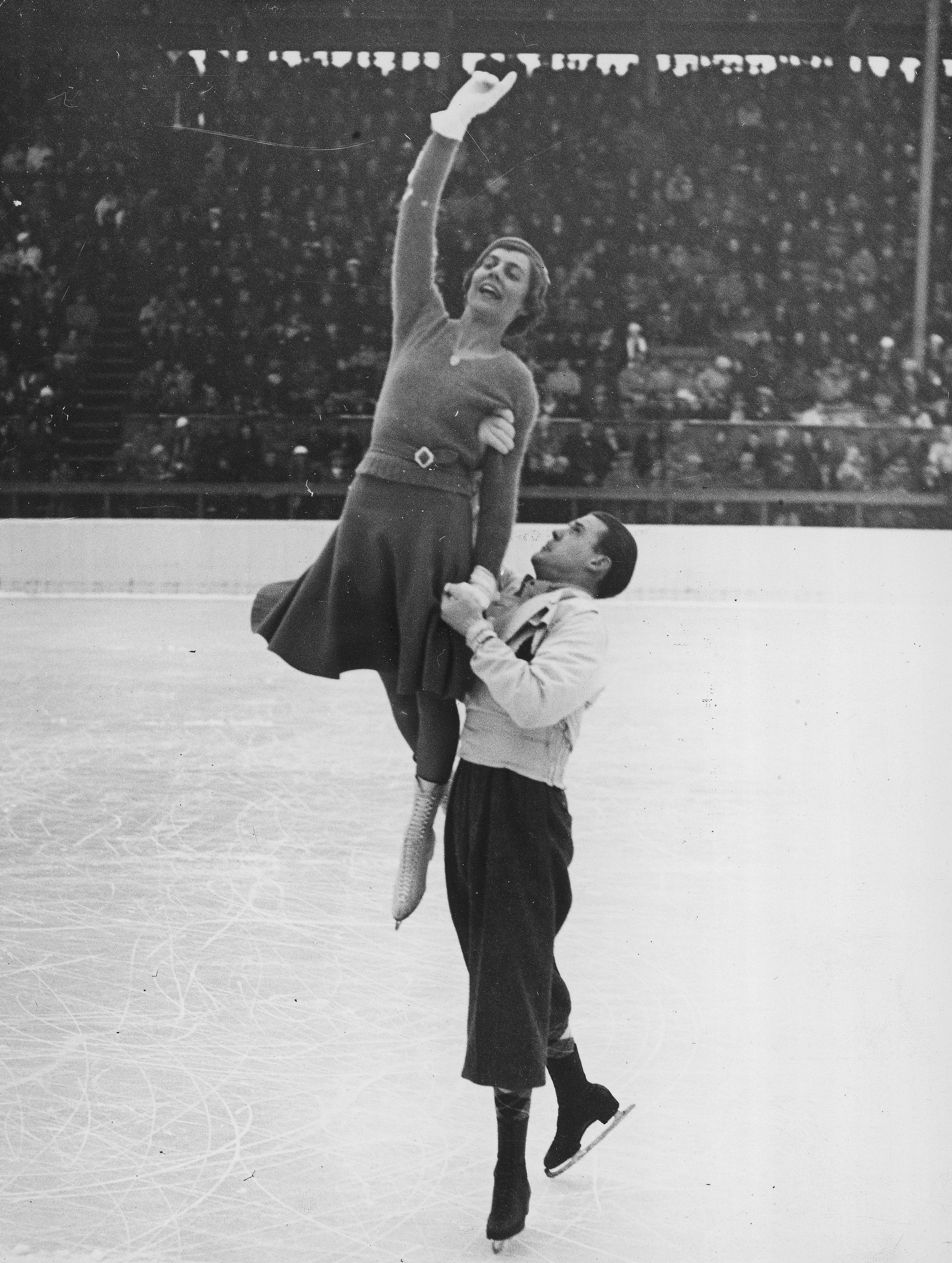
- Bertram being lifted by partner Stewart Reburn at the 1936 Winter Olympics

Personal information
- Full name: Frances Louise Bertram
- Born: March 30, 1908 Toronto, Ontario, Canada
- Died: October 18, 1996 (aged 88) Toronto, Ontario, Canada
- Home town: Toronto

Figure skating career
- Country: Canada
Medal record
Representing Canada
Pairs Figure skating
North American Championships
Bronze medal – third place	1935 Montreal	Pairs

Frances Louise Bertram (later Hulbig, March 30, 1908 – October 18, 1996) was a Canadian pair skater. Skating with Stewart Reburn, she was the 1935 Canadian champion and competed at the 1936 Winter Olympics.

== Career ==
Bertram competed at her first Canadian National Championships in 1928. She placed 4th in pairs, skating with Errol Morson.

In 1932, she competed at the Canadian Championships in four skating along with Stewart Reburn, Veronica Clarke, and John J. Machado. Their group won the competition.

At the 1934 Championships, she and Reburn won silver in the pairs competition. They again entered the fours competition, this time with Margaret Henry and Hubert Sprott, and won the silver medal.

In 1935, she and Reburn became the Canadian pairs champions, and they also won - as the only competitors - the tenstep competition. They placed second in the fours competition. In March, they competed at the North American Championships, where they won bronze. Writing for Skating magazine, Norman V. S. Gregory noted they skated to a tango time and said that although they at first appeared slow, "As they continue you realize you are seeing marvelous pair work, with much real difficulty peculiar to that type of pair."

They competed at the 1936 Winter Olympics. At the time, Canadian athletes received little support; Bertram and Reburn's chaperone at the Olympics said they were not given official jackets and made their own. Their scores varied considerably; the Swedish and Norwegian judges ranked them third and fourth, while the Austrian and German judges ranked them 13th and 14th. They finished in sixth place. Afterward, they competed at the 1936 World Championships and placed 4th. Theresa Weld Blanchard, writing a report about the competition, said, "Their program is so different from the other pairs that it is difficult to rank correctly."

Bertram made a last appearance at the Canadian Championships in 1937 to win bronze in the tenstep competition with Osborne Colson.

She and Reburn were called "the Fred Astaire and Ginger Rogers of the ice world", and they skated together in many shows. Reburn split from her in 1938 to tour with Sonja Henie. When asked about their split, Bertram simply said, "He went one way and I another." She continued performing through the early 1940s but stopped after she married.

== Personal life ==
Bertram married Sidney Hulbig, with whom she had a son with the given name Bertram. She died on October 18, 1996 in Aurora, Ontario.

In 2015, Bertram and Reburn were posthumously inducted into the Skate Canada Hall of Fame. Their induction said they were the "first pair team to skate to the music instead of using it as background".

== Competitive highlights ==
(with Stewart Reburn)

Event	1934	1935	1936
Winter Olympic Games			6th
World Championships			4th
North American Championships		3rd	
Canadian Championships	2nd	1st	
