= Michael Kirby (figure skater) =

Canadian figure skater

Personal information
- Born: February 20, 1925
- Died: May 25, 2002 (aged 77)

Figure skating career
- Country: Canada
Medal record
Representing Canada
Fours' Figure skating
North American Championships
Silver medal – second place	1941 Philadelphia	Fours

Michael J.R. Kirby (February 20, 1925 – May 25, 2002 in Laguna Niguel, CA) was a Canadian figure skater who competed in men's singles, and was also an actor. Later was an ice rink owner and skating coach.

== Childhood and youth ==
As a child he suffered from rheumatic fever and started ice-skating for physical therapy. When he turned 16, he became a Canadian national champion. He won the silver medal at the 1941 North American Championships and then won the gold medal at the Canadian Figure Skating Championships in 1942 before turning professional and joining the Ice Follies in 1943. He also competed in fours with Therese McCarthy, Virginia Wilson, and Donald Gilchrist in 1941 and 1942.

== Career ==
=== Acting ===
In the later 1940s, Kirby moved to Hollywood and signed a contract with MGM. He appeared in several movies including Keep Your Powder Dry (1945) with Lana Turner, and Summer Holiday (filmed in 1946, released in 1948) as Mickey Rooney's older brother.

Kirby was skating in a West Los Angeles ice rink in 1947 when the manager asked him to skate with the rink's owner, Sonja Henie. He then skated with her, and she asked him to work with her in her film The Countess of Monte Cristo (1948). He also joined Sonja's Hollywood Ice Review, which went to Europe and England.

After The Countess of Monte Cristo, he did not appear in another role until the 1970s, and he continued acting until his final role in Mythic Warriors: Guardians of the Legend.

=== Skating ===
Kirby relocated to Chicago in the 1948 from Newport Beach and established a chain of instructional ice skating rinks. He opened his first ice skating studio in River Forest, in a former garage near Lake Street and Harlem Avenue. As a coach, his pupils included Ronnie Robertson (who he also outed in a book Figure Skating to Fancy Skating) and Dick Button. In 1959, he was a founder of the Ice Rink Section, Illinois Recreation Association (which later became the Ice Skating Institute). He was the organization's first president. In 1962, he helped Eunice Kennedy Shriver with the Special Olympics. Kirby left Chicago about 1972 to help Ice Capades build up to 40 rinks around the world, including one in Saudi Arabia. In 1975, due to the downturn in ice-skating, most of Kirby's ice studios closed.

He is quoted as saying "Skating, like swimming and languages, is best learned early," in a 1954 newspaper article.

Later in life he was an ice-skating consultant and then the author of a biography on Sonja Henie, "Figure Skating to Fancy Skating-Memoirs of the Life of Sonja Henie".

== Personal life ==
Kirby married figure skater Norah McCarthy in 1944. They had eight children (five sons: Terry, David, Michael, Christopher and Thomas; and three daughters: Tricia Shafer, Ann Forster and Catherine Tanner) and the union lasted 57 years, until his death in 2002 of renal failure, in his home at Orange County, Calif.

== Results ==
=== Men's singles ===
Event	1938	1940	1941	1942
Canadian Championships	5th J	2nd J	1st J	1st

=== Pairs with Shirley Halsted ===
Event	1940
Canadian Championships	1st J

=== Fours ===
(with McCarthy, Wilson, and Gilchrist)

Event	1941
North American Championships	2nd
