= Dawn Steckley =

Canadian figure skater

Dawn Steckley (?-2002) was a Canadian figure skater. She was part of the Oshawa Skating Club.

== Biography ==
=== Career ===
Steckley competed in the Canadian Figure Skating Championships held in Ottawa, ON in 1953, in which she won three medals. Although still eligible to skate as a Junior she moved up to the Senior Ladies' Singles category, and finished second behind winner Barbara Gratton of the Toronto Skating Club.

With her skating partner David Lowery (also of the Oshawa Skating Club), they won first place in Junior Pairs; then moved up to Senior Pairs and finished second behind defending champions Frances Dafoe and Norris Bowden of the Toronto SC. Later that year, Steckley and Lowery represented Canada in the pairs category at the North American Skating Championships in Cleveland, Ohio and finished 4th.

In the 1954 Canadian Championships, held in Calgary, Alberta, Steckley and Lowery finished 3rd in Pairs behind Audrey Downie and Brian Power of the Connaught SC and repeat champions, Dafoe and Bowden.

=== Death ===
In the early 2000s, Steckley died of cancer.

== Results ==
Ladies singles

Event	1949	1950	1951	1952	1953
Canadian Championships	4th J	5th J	6th	6th	2nd

Pairs with Lowery

Event	1953	1954
North American Championships	4th	
Canadian Championships	2nd	3rd
Canadian Junior Championships	1st J	
