= Heather Kemkaran =

Canadian figure skater

Personal information
- Other names: Heather Kemkaran-Antymniuk
- Born: August 2, 1958 (age 68) Winnipeg, Manitoba, Canada
- Height: 1.52 m (5 ft 0 in)

Figure skating career
- Country: Canada
- Began skating: c. 1961
- Retired: 1980

Heather Kemkaran-Antymniuk (born August 2, 1958) is a Canadian former competitive figure skater who competed in ladies' singles. She is the 1977 Vienna Trophy champion, the 1977 Skate Canada International bronze medalist, and a two-time Canadian national champion (1978, 1980). She competed at the 1980 Winter Olympics.

== Personal life ==
Heather Kemkaran was born on August 2, 1958, in Winnipeg, Manitoba, Canada. She is now known as Kemkaran-Antymniuk and works as a lawyer.

== Skating career ==
Kemkaran started skating at age three on an outdoor rink in Strathclair. She was coached at age 11 by Gordon Linney at the Winnipeg Winter Club and at age 13 she joined Hellmut May in Vancouver. In 1974, she joined Carlo Fassi at the Colorado Ice Arena in Denver and eventually she was splitting her time between Colorado and the Toronto Cricket, Skating and Curling Club, where she trained under Ellen Burka.

Kemkaran won the 1975 Vienna Trophy. She began the following season with bronze at the Richmond Trophy and went on to reach her first senior national podium, taking silver behind Lynn Nightingale at the 1977 Canadian Championships. She was sent to the 1977 World Championships in Tokyo and finished 13th.

In the 1977–78 season, Kemkaran was awarded bronze at the 1977 Skate Canada International before winning the national title ahead of Cathie MacFarlane. She placed 12th at the 1978 World Championships in Ottawa.

During the 1978–79 season, Kemkaran took silver behind Janet Morrissey at the Canadian Championships. She was coached by Louis Stong.

Kemkaran returned to Burka for her final competitive season. She won her second national title and was selected to compete at the 1980 Winter Olympics in Lake Placid, New York. She finished 15th after placing 16th in figures, 12th in the short program, and 15th in the free skate. After being bypassed for the world team in favor of rising star Tracy Wainman (the bronze medalist from Nationals) Heather would retire from amateur skating.

== Results ==
International
Event	75–76	76–77	77–78	78–79	79–80
Winter Olympics					15th
World Champ.		13th	12th		
Skate Canada			3rd		
Ennia Challenge					3rd
Vienna Trophy	1st				
Richmond Trophy		3rd			
National
Canadian Champ.		2nd	1st	2nd	1st
