= Virginia Thompson =

Canadian ice dancer

Personal information
- Born: 1945 or 1946 (age 79–80)

Figure skating career
- Country: Canada
- Partner: William McLachlan
- Skating club: TCS & CC
Medal record
Figure skating
Ice dancing
Representing Canada
World Championships
Bronze medal – third place	1962 Prague	Ice dancing
Silver medal – second place	1960 Vancouver	Ice dancing
North American Championships
Gold medal – first place	1961 Philadelphia	Ice dancing

Virginia Thompson (born 1945 or 1946) is a Canadian ice dancer. With partner William McLachlan, she is the 1960-1962 Canadian national champion and a two-time World medallist.

== Competitive highlights ==
(with McLachlan)

Event	1960	1961	1962
World Championships	2nd		3rd
North American Championships		1st	
Canadian Championships	1st	1st	1st
British Championships			3rd
