= William McLachlan (figure skater) =

Canadian ice dancer

Personal information
- Full name: William George McLachlan
- Born: March 9, 1938
- Died: December 1, 2013 (aged 75) Toronto, Ontario, Canada

Figure skating career
- Country: Canada
- Partner: Geraldine Fenton; Virginia Thompson
- Skating club: TCS & CC
Medal record
Figure skating
Ice dancing
Representing Canada
World Championships
Bronze medal – third place	1962 Prague	Ice dancing
Silver medal – second place	1960 Vancouver	Ice dancing
Bronze medal – third place	1959 Colorado Springs	Ice dancing
Silver medal – second place	1958 Paris	Ice dancing
Silver medal – second place	1957 Colorado Springs	Ice dancing
North American Championships
Gold medal – first place	1961 Philadelphia	Ice dancing
Gold medal – first place	1959 Toronto	Ice dancing
Gold medal – first place	1957 Rochester	Ice dancing

William George McLachlan (March 9, 1938 – December 1, 2013) was a Canadian ice dancer. He competed first with partner Geraldine Fenton, and later with Virginia Thompson. He won five medals at the World Figure Skating Championships, two silvers and a bronze with Fenton, and one silver and a bronze with Thompson. He died in Toronto in 2013.

== Competitive highlights ==
(with Fenton)

Event	1954	1956	1957	1958	1959
World Championships			2nd	2nd	3rd
North American Championships			1st		1st
Canadian Championships	2nd	2nd	1st	1st	1st

(with Thompson)

Event	1960	1961	1962
World Championships	2nd		3rd
North American Championships		1st	
Canadian Championships	1st	1st	1st
British Championships			3rd
