= Richard Stephens (figure skater) =

Canadian pair skater

Richard Stephens (born December 8, 1947, in Port Perry, Ontario) is a Canadian former pair skater. With partner Anna Forder, he competed in the 1968 Winter Olympics and won the gold medal at the Canadian Figure Skating Championships the next year.

== Results ==
pairs with Anna Forder

Event	1965	1966	1967	1968	1969
Winter Olympic Games				13th	
World Championships					10th
Canadian Championships	3rd J	1st J	3rd	2nd	1st
