= Ormond B. Haycock =

Canadian figure skater

Ormonde Haycock
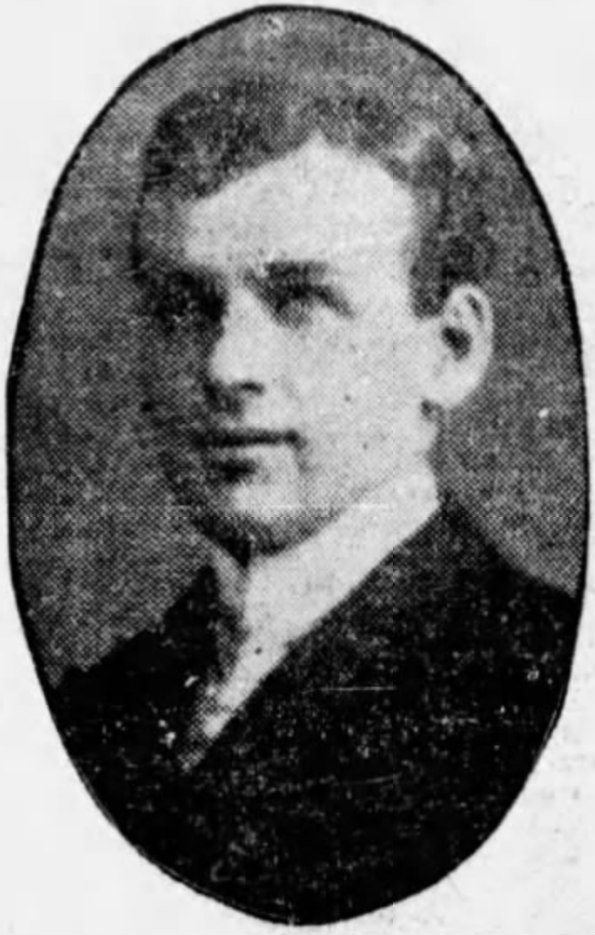
- Haycock c. 1913

Personal information
- Born: September 11, 1880 Ottawa, Ontario, Canada
- Died: August 12, 1938 (aged 57) Canandaigua, New York, U.S.

Figure skating career
- Country: Canada
- Partner: Katherine Haycock; Aimee Haycock; Lady Evelyn Grey

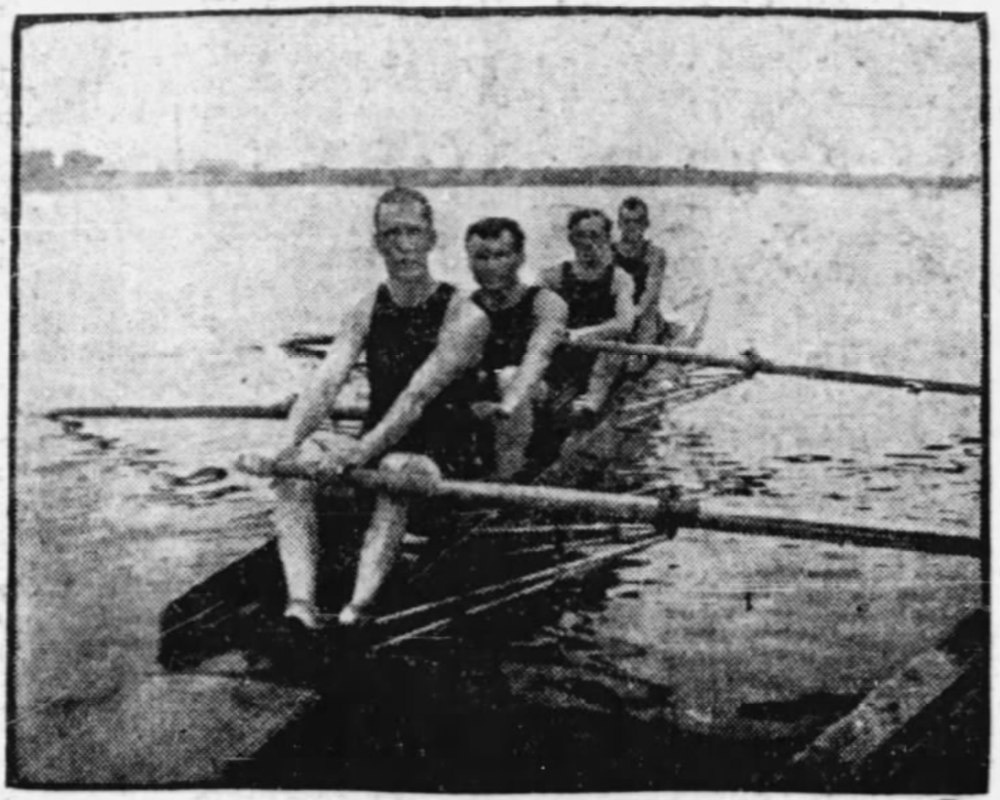
Haycock, at the back end of the photograph, with his Ottawa Rowing Club teammates Harvey Pulford, Eddie Phillips and Wilf Harrison.

Ormonde Butler "Ormie" Haycock (September 11, 1880 – August 12, 1938) was a Canadian figure skater and rower from Ottawa, Ontario, and he competed in both single skating and pair skating.

== Biography ==
Haycock's pairs partners in figure skating were his younger sisters Katherine and Aimee Haycock, as well as Lady Evelyn Grey. As a single skater, he is the 1905, 1906, 1908 and 1911 Canadian champion. He won the pairs skating Canadian championships in 1905 and 1906 with Katherine Haycock, in 1908 with Aimee Haycock, and in 1910 and 1911 with Lady Evelyn Grey.

Haycock was also a prominent rower with the Ottawa Rowing Club and in 1906 he won the American four-oared championship along with Harvey Pulford, Eddie Phillips and Wilf Poapst.

Haycock died at his summer home in Canandaigua, New York in 1938, at an age of 57.

== Figure skating results ==
men's singles

Event	1905	1906	1908	1910	1911
Canadian Championships	1st	1st	1st	2nd	1st

pairs with Katherine Haycock

Event	1905	1906
Canadian Championships	1st	1st

pairs with Aimée Haycock

Event	1908
Canadian Championships	1st

pairs with Evelyn Grey

Event	1910	1911
Canadian Championships	1st	1st
