= Peter Firstbrook =

Canadian figure skater

Personal information
- Born: May 11, 1933
- Died: February 22, 1985 (aged 51) Guanajuato, Mexico

Figure skating career
- Country: Canada
- Skating club: Toronto SC
Medal record
Representing Canada
Men's Figure skating
North American Championships
Silver medal – second place	1953 Cleveland	Men's singles
Fours' Figure skating
North American Championships
Silver medal – second place	1949 Philadelphia	Fours

Peter Sprott Firstbrook (May 11, 1933 – February 22, 1985) was a Canadian figure skater. As a single skater, he was the 1951–1953 Canadian national champion. He placed 5th at the 1952 Winter Olympics. He was one of the few skaters to win the Canadian Junior and Senior titles in consecutive years.

Firstbrook also competed as a pair skater. With partner Mary Kenner, he was the 1947 Canadian junior bronze medalist.

In addition to single and pair skating, Firstbrook competed in the four skating disciplines. With partners Mary Kenner, Vera Smith, and Peter Dunfield, he won the silver medal at the 1949 North American Figure Skating Championships. He died of pneumonia on February 22, 1985, in Guanajuato, Mexico, where he had been living in an artists' community.

== Competitive highlights ==
=== Singles career ===
Competition	1949	1950	1951	1952	1953
Winter Olympic Games				5th	
World Championships				7th	7th
North American Championships			4th		2nd
Canadian Championships	2nd J.	1st J.	1st	1st	1st

- J = Junior level

=== Pairs career ===
(with Mary Kenner)

Competition	1947
Canadian Championships	3rd J.

=== Fours career ===
(with Mary Kenner, Vera Smith, and Peter Dunfield)

Competition	1949
North American Championships	2nd
