= Gloucester Skating Club =

- Founded: 1971
- Type: non-profit
- Location(s): 1490 Youville Drive Ottawa, Ontario, Canada
- Members: 1,110 skaters
- Website: www.gloucesterskatingclub.ca

The Gloucester Skating Club is a non-profit skating club in Ottawa, Ontario, Canada. The club has been serving skaters since 1971. The club is currently one of the sixth largest clubs in Canada with an active membership of more than 1,100 skaters. The club may be best known as the home club of 1988 Olympic silver medallist Elizabeth Manley who returned to coach with the club in 2007.

The club offers a wide variety of skating programs including CanSkate, Competitive Stream, Test Stream, Synchronized, Dance, Pairs and Teen-Adult programs. The professional coaching staff includes and has included national, world and Olympic medalists, such as former world champion Jeffrey Buttle. In 2016, director and coach Sheilagh McCaskill was awarded an Ottawa Sports Award lifetime achievement award.

The Elizabeth Manley skating rink at the Bob MacQuarrie Orléans Recreation Complex (formerly Orléans Recreation Complex) is named for Manley who trained there and who won a silver medal in women's figure skating at the 1988 Calgary Winter Olympics. It is home to the Gloucester Skating Club and the Canadian Academy of Skating Arts, a program started by Canadian Hall of Fame coach, Peter Dunfield.

== Notable skaters ==
Figure skaters who have trained at the club include:

- Elizabeth Manley, 1988 Olympic silver medalist
- Angela Derochie, 1998 Canadian national champion
- Yuka Sato, 1994 World champion
- Stefanie Partridge, 1998 Canadian Jr. silver medalist and international competitor
- Matthew MacMurdo, 1997 Canadian Winter Games champion
- Mark Butt, 2000 US National Collegiate medalist
