= Cathy Lee Irwin =

Canadian figure skater

Cathy Lee Irwin (born September 4, 1952, in Vancouver, British Columbia) is a Canadian former figure skater who competed in ladies' singles. She is the 1970 Grand Prix International St. Gervais champion, the 1971 Richmond Trophy silver medalist, the 1972 Prize of Moscow News champion, and a two-time Canadian national silver medalist. She competed at the 1972 Winter Olympics in Sapporo, Japan.

== Results ==
International
Event	65–66	68–69	69–70	70–71	71–72	72–73
Winter Olympics					13th	
World Championships			10th		9th	12th
Prize of Moscow News						1st
Richmond Trophy					2nd	
St. Gervais International			2nd	1st		
National
Canadian Championships	1st J	3rd	2nd		2nd	3rd
