= Marie-Claude Savard-Gagnon =

Canadian pair skater

Personal information
- Born: July 12, 1972 (age 53) Quebec City, Quebec, Canada
- Home town: Baie-Saint-Paul
- Height: 5 ft 0 in (152 cm)
- Spouse: Steven Ferguson

Figure skating career
- Country: Canada
- Retired: 1999

Marie-Claude Savard-Gagnon (born July 12, 1972) is a Canadian former pair skater. With Luc Bradet, she won the gold medal at the 1997 Canadian Figure Skating Championships and competed at the 1998 Winter Olympics. Marie-Claude Savard-Gagnon and her partner, Luc Bradet were the first Pair Skaters to attempt the Quad Throw Salchow at the 1991 Nation's Cup in Gelsenkirshen, Germany.

== Results ==
(with Bradet)

Event	1991-92	1994-95	1995-96	1996-97	1997-98	1998-99
Winter Olympic Games					16th	
World Championships				14th	9th	
Canadian Championships	6th	4th	3rd	1st	2nd	
Skate America	7th			7th		
Skate Canada International						5th
Trophée Eric Bompard				9th		
Cup of Russia					3rd	
Bofrost Cup on Ice	6th		6th		5th	
Nebelhorn Trophy		1st				
