= Geraldine Fenton =

Canadian ice dancer (1935–2026)

Personal information
- Full name: Geraldine Marina Fenton Crispo
- Born: November 20, 1935 Toronto, Ontario, Canada
- Died: February 12, 2026 (aged 90) Kitchener, Ontario, Canada

Figure skating career
- Country: Canada
- Partner: William McLachlan
- Skating club: TCS & CC
- Retired: 1959
Medal record
Figure skating
Ice dancing
Representing Canada
World Championships
Bronze medal – third place	1959 Colorado Springs	Ice dancing
Silver medal – second place	1958 Paris	Ice dancing
Silver medal – second place	1957 Colorado Springs	Ice dancing
North American Championships
Gold medal – first place	1959 Toronto	Ice dancing
Gold medal – first place	1957 Rochester	Ice dancing

Geraldine Marina Fenton Crispo (née Fenton; November 20, 1935 – February 12, 2026) was a Canadian ice dancer. With partner William McLachlan, she was a three-time Canadian national champion and three-time World medallist.

Crispo was born on November 20, 1935, in Toronto. She retired from competition in 1959 in order to take a coaching position. Crispo died in Kitchener, Ontario on February 12, 2026, at the age of 90.

== Competitive highlights ==
(with McLachlan)

Event	1954	1956	1957	1958	1959
World Championships			2nd	2nd	3rd
North American Championships			1st		1st
Canadian Championships	2nd	2nd	1st	1st	1st

(with Skuce)

Event	1953
Canadian Championships	1st J

== Sources ==
- "Skate Canada: Canadian National Championships Medallists" (PDF). Archived from the original (PDF) on September 20, 2009.
- "ISU: World Medalists" (PDF). Archived from the original (PDF) on March 25, 2009.
