= Michael Slipchuk =

Canadian figure skater

Personal information
- Born: March 19, 1966 (age 60) Edmonton, Alberta, Canada

Figure skating career
- Country: Canada
- Retired: 1992

Michael Slipchuk (born March 19, 1966) is a Canadian former competitive figure skater.

As a competitive skater, Slipchuk won the 1992 Canadian Figure Skating Championships and placed 9th at the 1992 Winter Olympics. He competed five times at the World Figure Skating Championships. His highest placement was seventh, in 1991.

Following his competitive career, Slipchuk skated for two seasons on Stars On Ice and later worked as a coach in Calgary. He was named the High Performance Director of Skate Canada on September 21, 2006.

== Results ==
International
Event	85–86	86-87	87–88	88–89	89–90	90–91	91–92
Winter Olympics							9th
World Champ.		20th		9th	11th	7th	13th
Skate America							10th
Skate Canada		9th					
Int. de Paris				3rd			
Nations Cup							7th
NHK Trophy						5th	
Goodwill Games						7th	
Schäfer Memorial		1st					
St. Gervais			3rd				
National
Canadian Champ.	1st J	3rd	4th	2nd	3rd	3rd	1st
