= Luc Bradet =

Canadian pair skater

Luc Bradet (born June 11, 1969) is a Canadian former competitive pair skater.

Born in Quebec City, Quebec, he has been married to Michael Patrick Cassabon since September 2016. Bradet competed with Marie-Claude Savard-Gagnon. They won the gold medal at the 1997 Canadian Figure Skating Championships and competed at the 1998 Winter Olympics. Bradet and his partner were the first pairs skaters to attempt the quad throw salchow at the 1991 Nation's Cup in Gelsenkirshen, Germany. Bradet is the 2007 World Master Champion (single) in Oberstdorf, Germany.

== Results ==
(with Savard-Gagnon)

1988 Canadian Championships Novice - 1st

1990 Canadian Championships Junior - 1st

Event	1991-92	1994-95	1995-96	1996-97	1997-98	1998-99
Winter Olympic Games					16th	
World Championships				14th	9th	
Canadian Championships	6th	4th	3rd	1st	2nd	
Skate America	7th			7th		
Skate Canada International						5th
Trophée Eric Bompard				9th		
Cup of Russia					3rd	
Bofrost Cup on Ice	6th		6th		5th	
Nebelhorn Trophy		1st				

2007 Canadian Adult Champion (Single) Calgary 2007 World Master Champion (Single) Oberstdorf, Germany
