= Jay Humphry =

Canadian figure skater

Personal information
- Full name: James Clarke Humphry
- Born: July 28, 1948 (age 78) Vancouver, British Columbia

Figure skating career
- Country: Canada
Medal record
Representing Canada
North American Championships
Silver medal – second place	1969 Oakland	Men's singles

Jay (James Clarke) Humphry (born July 28, 1948, in Vancouver, British Columbia) is a Canadian former figure skater who competed in men's singles. He won the gold medal at the Canadian Figure Skating Championships in 1968 and 1969 and competed in the 1968 Winter Olympics. During his competitive career he was coached by Edi Rada and Ellen Burka.

After the 1969 season, he turned professional and skated with Ice Follies, where he portrayed the role of Oscar the Grouch from Sesame Street.

As of 2009, Humphry resides in Minneapolis, Minnesota where he works for a company that produces Sesame Street-themed live entertainment shows.

== Results ==
Event	1963	1964	1965	1966	1967	1968	1969
Winter Olympics						7th	
World Championships			12th	10th	12th	7th	6th
North American Championships			6th		4th		2nd
Canadian Championships	1st J.	3rd	3rd	3rd	2nd	1st	1st
