= Marcus Christensen =

Canadian figure skater

Personal information
- Born: April 2, 1970 (age 56) Toronto, Ontario, Canada
- Height: 1.77 m (5 ft 9 1/2 in)

Figure skating career
- Country: Canada
- Coach: Louis Stong, Marijane Stong, Paul Martini
- Skating club: Granite Club
- Began skating: 1976
- Retired: 1996

Marcus Christensen (born April 2, 1970) is a Canadian former competitive figure skater. He is the 1988 Grand Prix International St. Gervais champion, the 1988 Nebelhorn Trophy silver medalist, the 1992 Prague Skate bronze medalist, and a three-time Canadian national medalist (silver in 1995, bronze in 1993 and 1996). Christensen's highest ISU Championship placements were ninth at the 1988 Junior Worlds in Brisbane and tenth at the 1993 Worlds in Prague. He was coached by Louis Stong, Marijane Stong, and Paul Martini.

After retiring from competition, Christensen became a skating coach.

== Programs ==
Season	Short program	Free skating
1995–96		Remembrance by Maurice Jarre; JFK by John Williams; Drummer's Salute by D.G. McCroskie; Prologue

== Results ==
International
Event	87–88	88–89	89–90	90–91	91–92 4th Skate Canada	92–93	93–94	94–95	95–96
World Champ.						10th	15th	31st	27th
Skate America								9th	
Skate Canada							6th		
Prague Skate						3rd			
Nebelhorn Trophy		2nd							
St. Gervais		1st							
International
World Junior Champ.	9th								
National
Canadian Champ.	3rd J					3rd	4th	2nd	3rd
