= Angela Derochie =

Canadian figure skater

Personal information
- Born: November 4, 1973 (age 52) Trenton, Ontario

Figure skating career
- Country: Canada
- Retired: 1999

Angela Derochie (born November 4, 1973) is a Canadian former competitive figure skater. She is the 1992 Nebelhorn Trophy bronze medalist and 1998 Canadian national champion in ladies' singles.

== Personal life ==
Derochie was born on November 4, 1973, in Trenton, Ontario.

== Career ==
Derochie represented the Gloucester Skating Club in Ottawa, Ontario, and trained at the Canadian Academy of Skating Arts, coached by Peter Dunfield.

In the 1996–97 season, Derochie reached her first senior national podium, winning the silver medal behind Susan Humphreys at the 1997 Canadian Championships. The following season, she debuted on the Champions Series (Grand Prix), placing 9th at the 1997 Skate America and 12th at the 1997 NHK Trophy. She won the gold medal ahead of Keyla Ohs and Jennifer Robinson at the 1998 Canadian Championships in Hamilton, Ontario. She was selected to compete at the 1998 World Championships in Minneapolis and reached the final segment; she ranked 11th in her qualifying group, 19th in the short program, 20th in the free skate and 20th overall.

In the 1998–99 season, Derochie was coached by Marina Zoueva and Eric Loucks at the Minto Skating Club. She was awarded the bronze medal at the 1999 Canadian Championships, behind Robinson and Annie Bellemare, and assigned to the 1999 Four Continents, where she placed tenth.

In September 2006, Derochie joined the coaching staff of Dartmouth Skating Club. She is now the director of the North York Skating Academy in Toronto Ontario.

== Programs ==
Season	Short program	Free skating
1998–99		Hispanic Dance; Mexicaine Finale by Claude Bolling

== Results ==
GP: Champions Series / Grand Prix

International
Event	91–92	92-93	93–94	94–95	95–96	96–97	97–98	98–99
Worlds							20th	
Four Continents								10th
GP Cup of Russia								9th
GP NHK Trophy							12th	
GP Skate America							9th	
Nations Cup				11th				
Nebelhorn Trophy		3rd						
Schäfer Memorial					10th			
Skate America				8th				
Skate Canada				5th				
National
Canadian Champ.	1st J		5th	4th	6th	2nd	1st	3rd
J: Junior; WD: Withdrew
