= Stewart Reburn =

Canadian figure skater

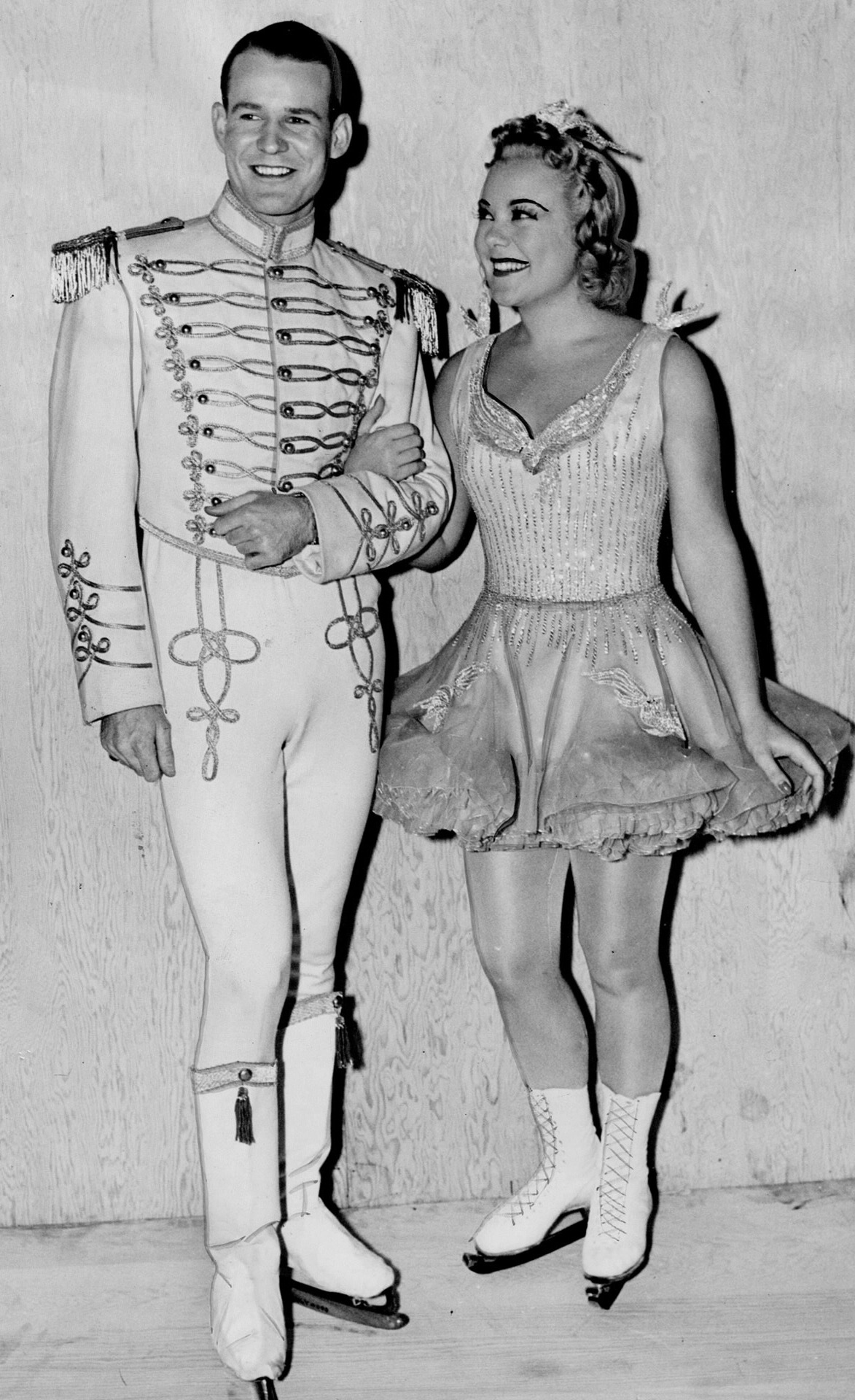
- Reburn with Henie in 1938

Personal information
- Full name: Stewart Dudley Dagge Reburn
- Born: August 10, 1912 Toronto, Canada
- Died: June 6, 1976 (aged 63) Toronto, Canada
- Home town: Toronto

Figure skating career
- Country: Canada
- Skating club: Toronto Skating Club
Medal record
Representing Canada
Pairs Figure skating
North American Championships
Bronze medal – third place	1935 Montreal	Pairs

Stewart Dudley Dagge Reburn (August 10, 1912 – June 6, 1976) was a Canadian figure skater who competed in singles and pair skating.

== Biography ==
He was the junior Canadian champion in singles in 1928, the same year he came third in the senior pairs championship with Veronica Clarke, and as a singles skater, won the silver medal at the Canadian Figure Skating Championships in 1929 and 1931. The following year he was runner-up in the senior singles to Bud Wilson, who won the first of his all-time record-setting nine Canadian titles in the event.

He was second to Wilson again in 1931, which led to his selection for the 1932 Winter Olympics, although he withdrew prior to competition, while Wilson took home the bronze medal.

Reburn, who had also taken the bronze medal in the pairs event with Cecil Smith at the 1931 national championships, was absent from the national scene for two years, then returned in 1934 with a new partner, Louise Bertram. The pair won the gold medal at the 1935 Canadian Championships, placed fourth in the world figure-skating championships and competed in the 1936 Winter Olympics, finishing sixth. They were the first pair team to ever really skate to the music instead of using it as mere background sound. Their new and charming style captured audiences in both the figure skating and entertainment worlds. In 2015, Reburn and Bertram were inducted into the Skate Canada Hall of Fame.

Following his competitive career, Reburn skated professionally as Sonja Henie's partner in her international touring ice show. He appeared with Henie in the 1939 film Second Fiddle.

Reburn enlisted in the Royal Canadian Air Force at the outbreak of World War II, becoming a fighter pilot with final rank attained of Flight Lieutenant. He was wounded by shrapnel in December 1943, which ended both his skating and promising acting career, although after the war he worked behind the scenes in the film industry for several years, prior to taking up real estate management. He died in 1976 at the age of 63 of cancer, and was buried in Mount Pleasant Cemetery in Toronto.

== Competitive highlights ==
=== Men's Singles ===
Event	1928	1929	1931
Canadian Championships	1st J.	2nd	2nd

- J = Junior level

=== Pairs career ===
(with Bertram)

Event	1934	1935	1936
Winter Olympic Games			6th
World Championships			4th
North American Championships		3rd	
Canadian Championships	2nd	1st	

(with Cecil Smith)

Event	1931
Canadian Championships	3rd

(with Veronica Clarke)

Event	1928
Canadian Championships	3rd
