= Maude Smith =

Canadian figure skater (1905–1996)

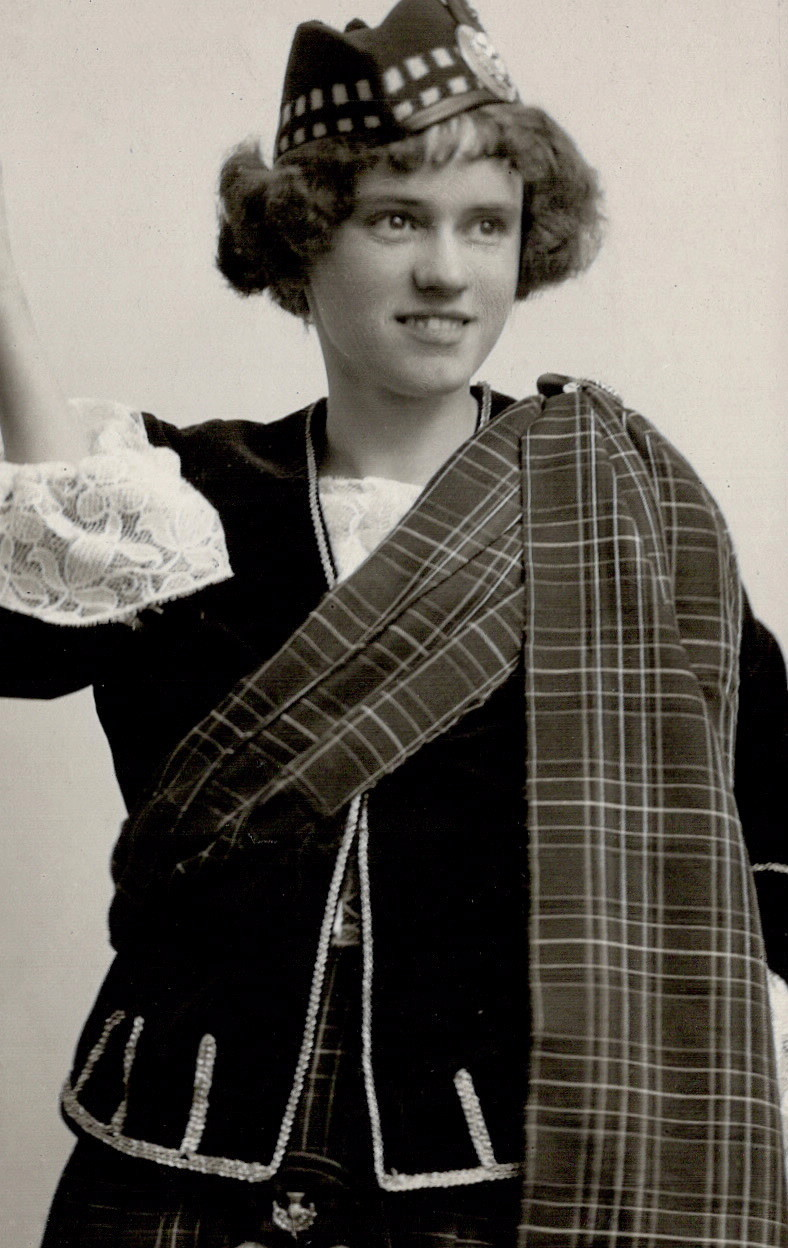
- Smith in 1928

Personal information
- Born: May 9, 1905 Toronto, Canada
- Died: November 17, 1996 (aged 91) Toronto, Canada

Figure skating career
- Country: Canada
- Skating club: Toronto Skating Club
- Retired: 1934

Hedley Maude McDougald (née Smith; 9 May 1905 – 17 November 1996) was a Canadian pairs skater, who was also known as "Jim" or "Jay".

== Biography ==
Together with Jack Eastwood she placed tenth at the 1928 Winter Olympics and sixth-seventh at the world championships in 1928, 1930 and 1932. The pair finished second at the national championships in 1929 and 1933 and third in 1934.

Smith was married to the prominent Canadian businessman John A. McDougald. She had a younger sister Cecil, who also competed at the 1928 Olympics. Their mother, Maude Delano-Osborne, won the Canadian tennis championship in 1892, 1893 and 1894.
