= Janet Morrissey =

Canadian figure skater

Personal information
- Full name: Janet Katherine Morrissey

Figure skating career
- Country: Canada
- Skating club: Nepean FSC
- Retired: 1980

Janet Morrissey is a former Canadian National figure skating champion. She is the 1978 Nebelhorn Trophy bronze medalist, 1978 Grand Prix International St. Gervais bronze medalist, and 1979 Canadian national champion.

== Life and career ==
Morrissey won the Canadian national novice bronze medal in 1974 and the junior bronze medal in 1977.

She began the 1978–79 season with bronze medals at the Nebelhorn Trophy in Germany and Grand Prix International St. Gervais in France. She went on to win the senior national title ahead of Heather Kemkaran and was sent to Vienna to compete at the 1979 World Championships, where she finished 19th. Her skating club was Nepean FSC.

After failing to gain a place on the 1980 Olympic team (due to losing her Canadian title to Heather Kemkaren, and only one spot being available to the Olympics for Canadian women) and being bypassed for Worlds in favor of rising star Tracy Wainmann, Morrissey first took a break from skating, which turned into an eventual retirement.

She was known mostly as an overall consistent competitor and strong jumper. She had a rock solid triple salchow, which she rarely missed. Regularly delivering a triple salchow, several double axels, and a full arsenal of double jumps and double combinations in her program, she had strong technical content for her time.

Morrissey studied computer science at Carleton University. She graduated in the spring of 1983.

== Results ==
International
Event	76–77	78–79	79–80
World Champ.		19th	
Skate Canada		5th	
Nebelhorn Trophy		3rd	
St. Gervais		3rd	
National
Canadian Champ.	3rd J	1st	2nd
