= Eleanor O'Meara =

Canadian figure skater

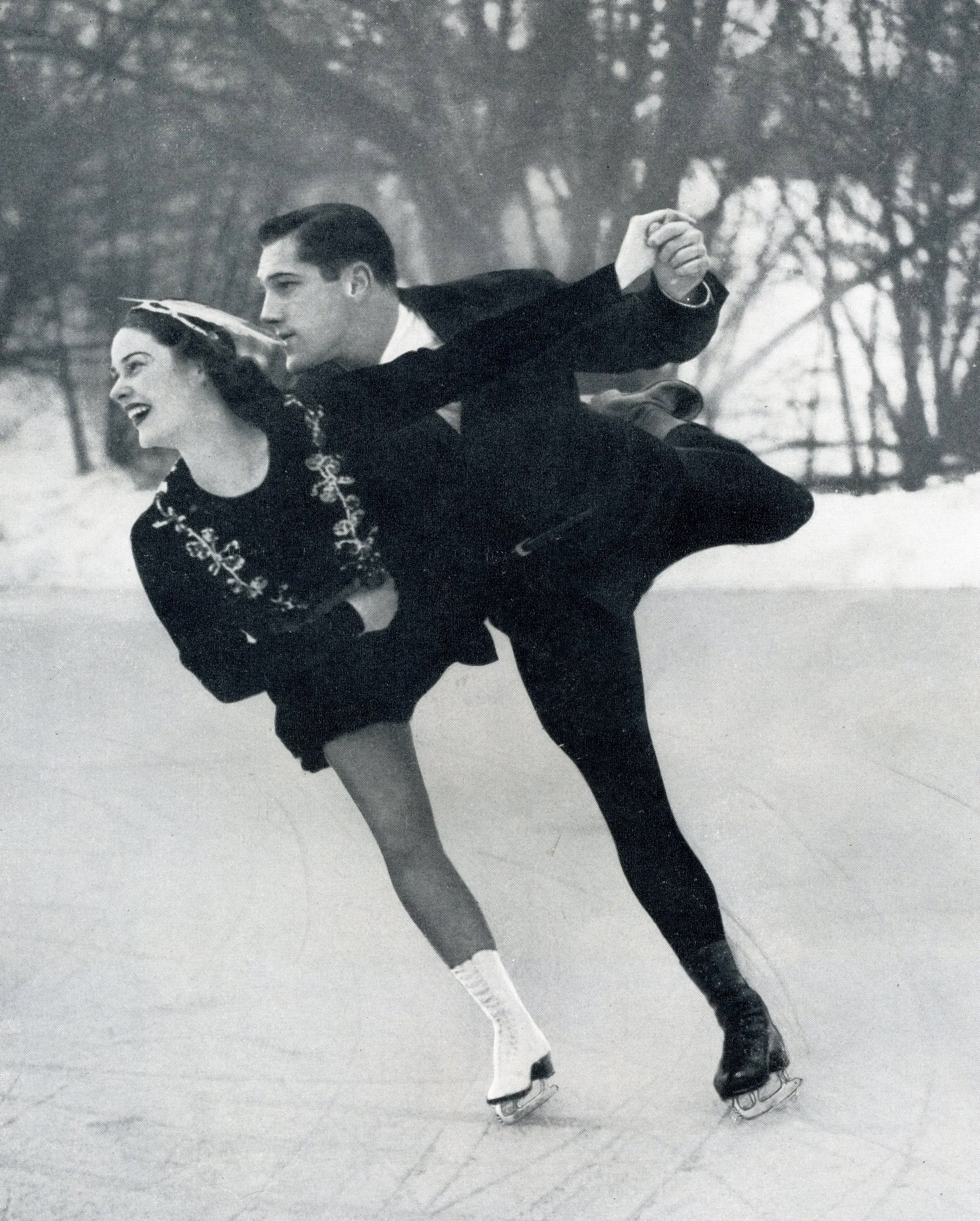
- O'Meara skating with McCreath in 1941

Personal information
- Full name: Eleanor O'Meara
- Died: March 21, 2000 Toronto, Ontario

Figure skating career
- Country: Canada
- Skating club: Toronto SC
Medal record
Representing Canada
Women's figure skating
North American Championships
Silver medal – second place	1941 Philadelphia	Ladies' singles
Bronze medal – third place	1937 Boston	Ladies' singles
Pairs' figure skating
North American Championships
Gold medal – first place	1941 Philadelphia	Pairs

Eleanor O'Meara was a Canadian figure skater who competed in single skating and pair skating with Ralph McCreath, with whom was the 1941 national and North American champion. In singles, she was the 1936 and 1938 National champion.

== Results ==
=== Singles career ===
Event	1934	1935	1936	1937	1938	1939	1940	1941
North American Championships				3rd				2nd
Canadian Championships	2nd J	2nd J	1st	2nd	1st	3rd	3rd	

=== Pairs career ===
(with Ralph McCreath)

Event	1941
North American Championships	1st
Canadian Championships	1st
