= Anna Forder =

Canadian pair skater

Anna Forder (born May 25, 1951 in Oshawa, Ontario) is a Canadian former pair skater. With partner Richard Stephens, she competed in the 1968 Winter Olympics and won the gold medal at the Canadian Figure Skating Championships the next year.

== Results ==
pairs with Richard Stephens

Event	1965	1966	1967	1968	1969
Winter Olympic Games				13th	
World Championships					10th
Canadian Championships	3rd J	1st J	3rd	2nd	1st
