= Mary Rose Thacker =

Canadian figure skater

Personal information
- Full name: Mary Rose Thacker
- Born: April 9, 1922
- Died: August 5, 1983 (aged 61) Victoria, British Columbia, Canada
- Home town: Winnipeg, Manitoba, Canada

Figure skating career
- Country: Canada
- Skating club: Winnipeg Winter Club
- Retired: 1942
Medal record
Representing Canada
Ladies' Figure skating
North American Championships
Gold medal – first place	1941 Philadelphia	Ladies' singles
Gold medal – first place	1939 Toronto	Ladies' singles

Mary Rose Thacker (April 9, 1922 – August 5, 1983) was a Canadian singles figure skater and a three-time (1939, 1941–1942) national and two-time (1939 and 1941) North American champion. She began skating at the Winnipeg skating club at the age of three years. In 1937, she became Canadian junior ladies' champion. At 16 years old in 1939, she won both the national and North American titles. She retired as a competitive skater in 1942 and became a coach. She started a skating school in British Columbia in 1947 and trained skaters for the next 35 years. She was inducted into the Canadian Figure Skating Hall of Fame as an athlete in 1995. She is also a member of the Manitoba Sports Hall of Fame.

== Results ==
Event	1936	1937	1939	1940	1941	1942
North American Championships			1st		1st	
Canadian Championships	2nd J	1st J	1st	2nd	1st	1st
