= Charlene Wong =

Canadian figure skater

Personal information
- Born: March 4, 1966 (age 60) Montreal, Quebec, Canada
- Height: 1.65 m (5 ft 5 in)

Figure skating career
- Country: Canada
- Retired: 1990

Charlene Wong (born March 4, 1966) is a Canadian former competitive figure skater. She is the 1981 NHK Trophy bronze medalist and competed at the 1988 Winter Olympics. She currently works as a figure skating coach.

== Personal life ==
Charlene Wong was born on March 4, 1966, in Montreal. She has two older siblings, a brother and sister.

== Career ==
Wong was coached from her early years by Helen Ann Shields and also received lessons from Tommy Litz, Barbara Roles, Kathy Casey, and Osborne Colson. In 1986, she joined Peter Dunfield and Sonya Dunfield who would coach her until 1990.

Wong won five medals at the Canadian Championships — four silver and one bronze. She was selected to compete at the 1988 Winter Olympics in Calgary and finished 13th. She retired from competition in 1990.

Wong became a coach in the United States. She has coached the following skaters:

- Victoria Muniz
- Amber Corwin
- Mirai Nagasu
- Caroline Zhang

== Results ==
International
Event	80–81	81–82	82–83	83–84	84–85	85–86	86–87	87–88	88–89	89–90
Olympics								13th		
Worlds			12th					17th	16th	
Nations Cup										6th
NHK Trophy		3rd				7th				
Skate America			5th							
Skate Canada					10th	4th			4th	
Skate Electric									1st	
International: Junior
Junior Worlds	10th									
National
Canadian Champ.		5th	2nd		3rd			2nd	2nd	2nd
