= Elizabeth Fisher (figure skater) =

Canadian figure skater

Personal information
- Born: 27 November 1910; London, Ontario, Canada
- Died: 28 April 2004 (aged 93); Toronto, Ontario, Canada

Sport
- Sport: Figure skating

Mary Elizabeth Lawson (née Fisher; 27 November 1910 – 28 April 2004) was a Canadian figure skater. She competed in the ladies' singles event at the 1932 Winter Olympics.
