= Norah McCarthy =

Canadian figure skater

Personal information
- Full name: Norah McCarthy

Figure skating career
- Country: Canada
- Skating club: Toronto SC
Medal record
Representing Canada
Ladies' Figure skating
North American Figure Skating Championships
Bronze medal – third place	1941 Philadelphia	Ladies' singles
Bronze medal – third place	1939 Toronto	Ladies' singles
Pairs' Figure skating
North American Figure Skating Championships
Silver medal – second place	1939 Toronto	Pairs
Ladies' Figure skating
Canadian Figure Skating Championships
Silver medal – second place	1939 Canada	Ladies' singles
Gold medal – first place	1940 Canada	Ladies' singles
Bronze medal – third place	1941 Canada	Ladies' singles
Pairs' Figure skating
Canadian Figure Skating Championships
Gold medal – first place	1939 Canada	Pairs
Gold medal – first place	1940 Canada	Pairs
Silver medal – second place	1941 Canada	Pairs

Norah McCarthy was a Canadian figure skater who competed in single skating winning the 1940 national title, and pair skating. She competed in pairs first with Ralph McCreath, winning the 1939 and 1940 national titles, and later with Sandy McKechnie. She competed in the Canadian Figure Skating Championships and the North American Figure Skating Championships. Norah was also the daughter of the Canadian professional skating star, barrel jumper, and Canadian speed skater, Red McCarthy.

== Results ==
=== Singles career ===
Event	1937	1938	1939	1940	1941
North American Figure Skating Championships			3rd		3rd
Canadian Figure Skating Championships	2nd J	1st J	2nd	1st	3rd

=== Pairs career ===
(with Ralph McCreath)

Event	1939	1940
North American Figure Skating Championships	2nd	
Canadian Figure Skating Championships	1st	1st

(with Sandy McKechnie)

Event	1941
Canadian Figure Skating Championships	2nd
