= Mary Littlejohn =

Canadian figure skater

Personal information
- Born: May 26, 1903 South Crosby, Ontario, Canada
- Died: 1988 (aged 84–85) Gananoque, Ontario, Canada

Sport
- Sport: Figure skating

Mary Littlejohn (26 May 1903 – September 1988) was a Canadian figure skater. She competed in the ladies' singles event at the 1932 Winter Olympics.
