= Jack Eastwood =

Canadian figure skater (1908–1995)

- Born: John Coulter Eastwood; March 7, 1908; Toronto, Ontario, Canada
- Died: March 22, 1995 (aged 87); Toronto, Ontario, Canada

Figure skating career
- Country: Canada

John Coulter Eastwood (March 7, 1908 – March 22, 1995) was a Canadian figure skater. He competed in two events at the 1928 Winter Olympics.
