= Osborne Colson =

Canadian figure skater

- Born: March 31, 1916; Toronto, Ontario, Canada
- Died: July 14, 2006 (aged 90); Toronto, Ontario, Canada
- Occupation: Skating coach

Osborne Colson (March 31, 1916 – July 14, 2006) was a Canadian figure skater and coach.

Colson was born in Toronto, Ontario on March 31, 1916. His father was one of the founders of the Toronto Cricket, Skating and Curling Club. He won the Canadian Figure Skating Championships in 1936 and 1937. He trained with Gus Lussi during his competitive career. He later skated professionally with Ice Follies.

As a coach, he worked with skaters including Barbara Ann Scott, Donald Jackson, Patrick Chan and Sarah Kawahara. He continued to stay active in the sport late in life as the coach of Patrick Chan, who won the 2005 Canadian junior championship under his guidance.

Colson died in Toronto on July 14, 2006, from pneumonia and other complications from a car accident earlier in the year.

== Results ==
Men's singles

Event	1931	1932	1933	1934	1935	1936	1937
Canadian Championships	2nd J.	2nd J.	1st J.		2nd	1st	1st

- J = Junior level

Pairs with Mary Jane Halsted

Event	1936
Canadian Championships	3rd

Pairs with Joan Taylor

Event	1933
Canadian Championships	3rd J
