= Vera Smith (figure skater) =

Canadian figure skater

Personal information
- Full name: Vera Virginia Smith
- Nationality: Canadian
- Born: 21 May 1932
- Died: 12 October 2012 (aged 80)

Sport
- Sport: Figure skating

Vera Virginia "Vevi" Smith (21 May 1932 – 12 October 2012) was a Canadian figure skater.

Smith started skating at the age of five where she curled at the Toronto Skating Club. In her first junior national championship in 1943 junior championship she placed ninth. In 1947 she won the Howard trophy which served as the Canadian junior national championship; she was 14 years-old at the time. She competed in the ladies' singles event at the 1952 Winter Olympics.
