= Figure skating at the 1956 Winter Olympics =

Figure skating at the VII Winter Olympics
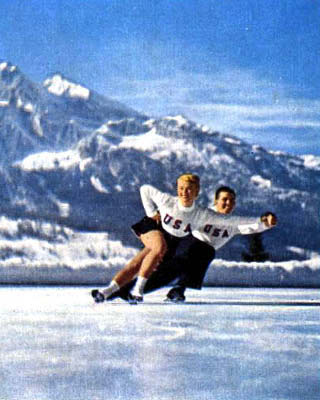
- Lucille Ash and Sully Kothman at the 1956 Winter Olympics in Cortina d'Ampezzo, Italy.
- Type: Olympic Games

Champions
- Men's singles: (United States) Hayes Alan Jenkins
- Ladies' singles: (United States) Tenley Albright
- Pairs: (Austria) Sissy Schwarz / Kurt Oppelt
- Previous: 1952 Winter Olympics
- Next: 1960 Winter Olympics

Figure skating at the 1956 Winter Olympics took place at the Olympic Ice Stadium in Cortina d'Ampezzo, Italy. Three figure skating events were contested: men's singles, ladies' singles, and pair skating. It was final time figure skating at the Olympics took place on an outdoor rink.

== Medal summary ==
Event	Gold	Silver	Bronze
Men's singles	Hayes Alan Jenkins; United States	Ronnie Robertson; United States	David Jenkins; United States
Ladies' singles	Tenley Albright; United States	Carol Heiss; United States	Ingrid Wendl; Austria
Pair skating	Sissy Schwarz / Kurt Oppelt; Austria	Frances Dafoe / Norris Bowden; Canada	Marianna Nagy / László Nagy; Hungary

== Participating nations ==
- Australia (2)
- Austria (8)
- Canada (7)
- Czechoslovakia (4)
- Finland (1)
- France (3)
- United Team of Germany (4)
- Great Britain (8)
- Hungary (2)
- Italy (2)
- Netherlands (2)
- Spain (1)
- Sweden (1)
- Switzerland (4)
- United States (10)

== Medal table ==
Rank	Nation	Gold	Silver	Bronze	Total
1	United States	2	2	1	5
2	Austria	1	0	1	2
3	Canada	0	1	0	1
4	Hungary	0	0	1	1
Totals (4 entries)		3	3	3	9

== Results ==
=== Men ===
Rank	Name	Nation	CF	FS	Points	Places
1	Hayes Alan Jenkins	United States	1	2	166.43	13
2	Ronald Robertson	United States	2	1	165.79	16
3	David Jenkins	United States	3	3	162.82	27
4	Alain Giletti	France	4	4	159.63	37
5	Karol Divín	Czechoslovakia	5	5	154.25	49.5
6	Michael Booker	Great Britain	6	6	154.26	53.5
7	Norbert Felsinger	Austria	7	8	150.55	67
8	Charles Snelling	Canada	9	7	150.42	67
9	Alain Calmat	France	8	9	148.35	77
10	Tilo Gutzeit	United Team of Germany	10	11	141.08	90
11	François Pache	Switzerland	11	10	139.39	95
12	Hans Müller	Switzerland	12	12	135.28	112
13	Allan Ganter	Australia	13	14	132.41	114
14	Darío Villalba	Spain	14	16	127.30	128
15	Kalle Tuulos	Finland	15	15	124.50	137
16	Charles Keeble	Australia	16	13	123.93	137

Referee:

- Werner Rittberger

Assistant referee:

- Walter S. Powell

Judges:

- (Australia) Sydney R. Croll
- (Austria) Hans Meixler
- (Canada) Ralph S. McCreath
- (Czechoslovakia) Emil Skákala
- (France) Gérard Rodrigues Henriques
- (Germany) Adolf Walker
- (United Kingdom) Pauline Barrajo
- (United States) H. Kendall Kelley
- (Switzerland) Jean Kreuz

=== Ladies ===
Rank	Name	Nation	CF	FS	Points	Places
1	Tenley Albright	United States	1	1	169.67	12
2	Carol Heiss	United States	2	2	168.02	21
3	Ingrid Wendl	Austria	3	5	159.44	39
4	Yvonne Sugden	Great Britain	4	9	156.62	53
5	Hanna Eigel	Austria	5	4	157.15	52
6	Carole Jane Pachl	Canada	6	8	154.74	73
7	Hanna Walter	Austria	8	7	153.89	83.5
8	Catherine Machado	United States	10	3	153.48	86.5
9	Ann Johnston	Canada	7	10	152.56	94
10	Rosi Pettinger	United Team of Germany	11	6	152.04	101
11	Erica Batchelor	Great Britain	9	12	149.67	116
12	Sjoukje Dijkstra	Netherlands	12	15	145.80	140
13	Joan Haanappel	Netherlands	14	11	145.85	145.5
14	Dianne Carol Peach	Great Britain	13	13	144.75	151
15	Fiorella Negro	Italy	16	14	142.31	168.5
16	Karin Borner	Switzerland	15	16	141.69	171
17	Maryvonne Huet	France	17	19	138.30	194
18	Alice Fischer	Switzerland	18	20	137.69	203
19	Alice Lundström	Sweden	19	18	136.34	206
20	Jindra Kramperová	Czechoslovakia	21	17	136.67	209
21	Manuela Angeli	Italy	20	21	133.51	222

Referee:

- Adolf Rosdol

Assistant referee:

- Ercole Cattaneo

Judges:

- (Australia) Sydney R. Croll
- (Austria) Oscar Madol
- (Canada) Ralph S. McCreath
- (Czechoslovakia) Josef Dědič
- (France) Gérard Rodrigues Henriques
- (Germany) Adolf Walker
- (United Kingdom) Mollie Phillips
- (Italy) Mario Verdi
- (Netherlands) Charlotte Benedict Stieber
- (United States) H. Kendall Kelley
- (Switzerland) Jean Creux

=== Pairs ===
Rank	Name	Nation	Points	Places
1	Sissy Schwarz / Kurt Oppelt	Austria	11.31	14
2	Frances Dafoe / Norris Bowden	Canada	11.32	16
3	Marianna Nagy / László Nagy	Hungary	11.03	32
4	Marika Kilius / Franz Ningel	United Team of Germany	10.98	35.5
5	Carole Ann Ormaca / Robin Greiner	United States	10.71	56
6	Barbara Wagner / Robert Paul	Canada	10.74	54.5
7	Lucille Ash / Sully Kothmann	United States	10.63	59.5
8	Věra Suchánková / Zdeněk Doležal	Czechoslovakia	10.53	68.5
9	Elisabeth Ellend / Konrad Lienert	Austria	10.38	77
10	Joyce Coates / Anthony Holles	Great Britain	10.00	88
11	Patricia Krau / Rodney Ward	Great Britain	9.86	93

==== Referees ====
- Referee: Gustavus F.C. Witt
- Assistant referee: Marcel Nicaise

==== Judges ====
- Sydney R. Croll (Australia)
- Hans Meixner (Austria)
- Ralph S. McCreath (Canada )
- Emil Skákala (Czechoslovakia)
- Rudolf A. Marx (Germany)
- H. Kendall Kelley (United States)
- Pamela Davis (United Kingdom)
- Zoltán Balász (Hungary)
- Jean Creux (Switzerland)
