= 1955 World Figure Skating Championships =

Annual figure skating competition held in 1955

- Type: ISU Championship
- Date: February 15 – 18
- Season: 1955
- Location: Vienna, Austria

Champions
- Men's singles: (United States) Hayes Alan Jenkins
- Ladies' singles: (United States) Tenley Albright
- Pairs: (Canada) Frances Dafoe / Norris Bowden
- Ice dance: (United Kingdom) Jean Westwood / Lawrence Demmy
- Previous: 1954 World Championships
- Next: 1956 World Championships

The World Figure Skating Championships is an annual figure skating competition sanctioned by the International Skating Union in which figure skaters compete for the title of World Champion.

The 1955 competitions for men, ladies, pair skating, and ice dancing took place from February 15th to 18th in Vienna, Austria.

== Medal table ==
* Host nation (Austria)

Rank	Nation	Gold	Silver	Bronze	Total
1	United States	2	2	1	5
2	Great Britain	1	1	1	3
3	Canada	1	0	0	1
4	Austria*	0	1	1	2
5	Hungary	0	0	1	1
Totals (5 entries)		4	4	4	12

== Results ==
=== Men ===
Rank	Name	Places
1	(United States) Hayes Jenkins	11
2	(United States) Ronald Robertson	16
3	(United States) David Jenkins	28
4	(France) Alain Giletti	37
5	(Czechoslovakia) Karol Divín	58
6	(United Kingdom) Michael Booker	58
7	(Austria) Norbert Felsinger	60
8	(Canada) Charles Snelling	69
9	(France) Alain Calmat	79
10	(United Kingdom) Hugh Graham	79
11	(Hungary) István Szenes	103
12	(Switzerland) Hans Müller	114
13	(West Germany) Tilo Gutzeit	114
14	(United Kingdom) Brian Tuck	119

Judges:

- (Switzerland) Jean Creux
- (Canada) Donald Gilchrist
- (United Kingdom) Alexander Gordon
- (Czechoslovakia) V. Koudelka
- (Austria) Oskar Madl
- (France) Gérard Rodrigues-Henriques
- (United States) R. Sackett
- (Hungary) Elemér Terták
- (West Germany) Adolf Walker

=== Ladies ===
Rank	Name	Points	Places
1	(United States) Tenley Albright	190.96	9
2	(United States) Carol Heiss	180.31	28
3	(Austria) Hanna Eigel	179.78	29
4	(Austria) Ingrid Wendl	178.46	41
5	(United Kingdom) Erica Batchelor	177.56	43
6	(Canada) Yarmila Pachl	175.16	58
7	(United States) Patricia Firth	174.49	59
8	(United Kingdom) Yvonne Sugden	174.59	64
9	(Canada) Ann Johnston	172.51	77
10	(United States) Catherine Machado	169.43	87
11	(West Germany) Rosi Pettinger	161.98	105
12	(Australia) Dawn Hunter	158.42	121
13	(Austria) Ilse Musyl	157.99	126
14	(Czechoslovakia) Dagmar Řeháková	157.89	129
15	(Netherlands) Joan Haanappel	156.06	138
16	(Italy) Fiorella Negro	161.98	141
17	(Switzerland) Alice Fischer	153.37	158.5
18	(Czechoslovakia) Miroslava Náchodská	153.03	162
19	(France) Maryvonne Huet	152.54	162.5
20	(West Germany) Erika Rücker	150.66	175
21	(Netherlands) Sjoukje Dijkstra	151.57	176
WD	(Austria) Hanna Walter	DNS	

Judges:

- (Switzerland) Jean Creux
- (United Kingdom) Pamela Davis
- (Czechoslovakia) Josef Dědič
- (Canada) Donald Gilchrist
- (West Germany) F. Händel
- (United States) A. Krunoy
- (Austria) Edwin Kucharz
- (France) Gérard Rodrigues-Henriques
- (Italy) Mario Verdi

=== Pairs ===
Rank	Name	Points	Places
1	(Canada) Frances Dafoe / Norris Bowden	10.88	17.5
2	(Austria) Sissy Schwarz / Kurt Oppelt	10.82	17.5
3	(Hungary) Marianna Nagy / László Nagy	10.57	28
4	(United States) Carole Ormaca / Robin Greiner	10.27	46
5	(Canada) Barbara Wagner / Robert Paul	10.08	65
6	(Czechoslovakia) Věra Suchánková / Zdeněk Doležal	10.06	66.5
7	(West Germany) Marika Kilius / Franz Ningel	10.01	68.5
8	(United States) Lucille Ash / Sully Kothmann	10.02	70.5
9	(West Germany) Alice Zettel / Klaus Loichinger	9.96	70.5
10	(Austria) Liesl Ellend / Konrad Lienert	9.82	82.5
11	(Hungary) Éva Szöllősi / Gábor Vida	9.78	83
12	(United Kingdom) Vivien Higson / Robert Hudson	9.79	87.5

Judges:

- (Switzerland) J. Creux
- (Canada) Donald H. Gilchrist
- (West Germany) F. Händel
- (Czechoslovakia) V. Koudelka
- (United States) A. Krunoy
- (United Kingdom) Mollie Phillips
- (Hungary) Elemér Terták
- (Italy) M. Verdi
- (Austria) Franz Wojtanowskyj

=== Ice dance ===
Rank	Name	Points	Places
1	(United Kingdom) Jean Westwood / Lawrence Demmy	37.09	7
2	(United Kingdom) Pamela Weight / Paul Thomas	36.52	14
3	(United Kingdom) Barbara Radford / Raymond Lockwood	35.29	21
4	(United States) Carmel Bodel / Edward Bodel	34.23	28
5	(United States) Joan Zamboni / Roland Junso	34.11	34
6	(United States) Phyllis Forney / Martin Forney	33.23	43
7	(France) Fanny Besson / Jean Guhel		50
8	(West Germany) Sigrid Knake / Günther Koch		69
9	(Austria) Lucia Fischer / Rudolf Zorn	31.20	69
10	(Italy) Bona Giammona / Giancarlo Sioli		75
11	(Canada) Lindis Johnston / Jeffrey Johnston		77
12	(Netherlands) Catharina Odink / Jacobus Odink		80
13	(France) Claude Weinstein / Claude Lambert		83
14	(Austria) Edith Peikert / Hans Kutschera	30.33	84
15	(Austria) Luise Lehner / Georg Lenitz	28.38	104

Judges:

- (United Kingdom) Pauline L. Barrajo
- (Italy) P. Farinet
- (Austria) Hans Meixner
- (France) Henri Meudec
- (United States) R. Sackett
- (Hungary) László Szollás
- (Belgium) A. Voordeckers

== Sources ==
- Result List provided by the ISU
