= 1956 in sports =

1956 in sports describes the year's events in world sport.

== Alpine skiing ==
- The men's Olympic gold medal:
  - Downhill: Toni Sailer, Austria
  - Slalom: Toni Sailer, Austria
  - Giant Slalom: Toni Sailer, Austria
- The women's Olympic gold medal:
  - Downhill: Madeleine Berthod, Switzerland
  - Slalom: Renée Colliard, Switzerland
  - Giant Slalom: Ossi Reichert, West Germany
- FIS Alpine World Ski Championships:
  - Men's combined champion: Toni Sailer, Austria
  - Women's combined champion: Madeleine Berthod, Switzerland

== American football ==
- NFL Championship: the New York Giants won 47–7 over the Chicago Bears at Yankee Stadium in the Bronx
- Orange Bowl (1955 season):
  - The Oklahoma Sooners won 20–6 over the Maryland Terrapins; voted national champions by AP Poll and Coaches Poll
- 1956 college football season:
  - The Oklahoma Sooners win the college football national championship (don't participate in a bowl game the following January due to "no-repeat rule")
- 1956 NAIA football season
  - Montana State and St. Joseph tie for the first ever National Association of Intercollegiate Athletics championship game.

== Association football ==
- European Cup – Real Madrid beat Stade de Reims 4–3 in the inaugural final.

=== England ===
- First Division – Manchester United win the 1955–56 title.
- FA Cup – Manchester City beat Birmingham City 3–1.

=== Netherlands ===
- Eredivise, a premier football league in Holland, a first regular season games held on September 2.

== Athletics ==
- Betty Cuthbert (Australia) and Bobby Morrow (USA) win three gold medals each in the sprint events at the Olympic Games in Melbourne.

== Australian rules football ==
- Victorian Football League
  - May 12: Stuart Spencer kicks 0.11 for Melbourne against Geelong, equalling the record for the most behinds in a match without scoring a goal.
  - July 21: Melbourne's run of nineteen consecutive wins, the fourth highest on record, is ended by Footscray, who score 10.12 (72) to the Demons' 7.17 (59).
  - September 15: Melbourne wins the 60th VFL Premiership, beating Collingwood 17.19 (121) to 6.12 (48) in the Grand Final.
  - Brownlow Medal awarded to Peter Box (Footscray)
- South Australian National Football League
  - August 4: Port Adelaide, after starting with thirteen unbeaten games and on target for a rare unbeaten season, are unexpectedly beaten by lowly South Adelaide for their only loss of the season.
  - September 29: Port Adelaide beat West Adelaide for their third successive SANFL premiership, scoring 12.9 (81) to 9.11 (65).
- West Australian Football League
  - May 12: East Perth kick only 1.4 (10) against Perth at the WACA in heavy rain, with their lone goal coming in total darkness with three minutes remaining. It is not only the lowest score in the WAFL between 1946 and 2002, but the lowest score by any eventual premier club in a major Australian Rules competition since present-day scoring was introduced in the late 1890s.
  - October 13: East Perth 10.17 (77) defeat South Fremantle 9.10 (64) for their first senior WAFL premiership since 1936.

== Baseball ==
- April 17 – Luis Aparicio replaces fellow Venezuelan Chico Carrasquel as the White Sox' everyday shortstop. Aparicio, who played 10 seasons with the White Sox, was elected to the Hall of Fame in 1984 and had his #11 retired by the Sox in the same year.
- July 14 – Boston Red Sox lefty Mel Parnell pitches a no-hitter against the Chicago White Sox at Fenway Park, winning 4–0. It is only Parnell's third win against two losses and is the sixth straight loss for second-place Chicago. The no-hitter is the first for the Red Sox since 1923. Parnell will go 4-4 before a torn muscle in his pitching arm ends his career as the Red Sox' winningest southpaw.
- July 25 – Pittsburgh Pirates outfielder Roberto Clemente becomes the first (and to date only) player to hit a walk-off inside-the-park grand slam in a win over the Chicago Cubs at Pittsburgh's old Forbes Field.
- World Series – New York Yankees win 4 games to 3 over the Brooklyn Dodgers. Yankees pitcher Don Larsen, pitches the only perfect game in World Series history, earning himself MVP honors. It was the only no-hitter thrown in any postseason game until October 6, 2010, in his first postseason appearance, Philadelphia Phillies pitcher Roy Halladay pitched a no-hitter against Cincinnati Reds in the NLDS.
- December 1 – Cincinnati slugger Frank Robinson is unanimously voted the NL Rookie of the Year. White Sox shortstop Luis Aparicio is voted AL Rookie of the Year with 22 points, beating out Baltimore's Tito Francona and Rocky Colavito of the Indians.

== Basketball ==
- NCAA Men's Basketball Championship:
  - San Francisco wins 83–71 over Iowa
- NBA Finals:
  - Philadelphia Warriors won 4 games to 1 over the Fort Wayne Pistons

== Boxing ==
- March 19 – At age 48, Dutch boxer Bep van Klaveren contests his last match in Rotterdam.
- April 27 – Rocky Marciano retires as the only undefeated Heavyweight Champion of the world with a perfect record (49-0).
- November 30, in Chicago – Floyd Patterson knocks out Archie Moore in the 5th round to win the vacant World Heavyweight title.

== Canadian football ==
- Grey Cup – Edmonton Eskimos win 50–27 over the Montreal Alouettes

== Cricket ==
- July 31 – Jim Laker sets an extraordinary record at Old Trafford in the fourth Test between England and Australia, taking 19 wickets in a first class match (the previous best was 17).

== Cycling ==
- Giro d'Italia won by Charly Gaul of Luxembourg
- Tour de France – Roger Walkowiak of France
- UCI Road World Championships – Men's road race – Rik Van Steenbergen of Belgium

== Field hockey ==
- Olympic Games (Men's Competition) in Melbourne, Australia
  - Gold Medal: India
  - Silver Medal: Pakistan
  - Bronze Medal: West Germany

== Figure skating ==
- 1956 Winter Olympics:
  - Men's champion: Hayes Alan Jenkins, United States
  - Ladies' champion: Tenley Albright, United States
  - Pair skating champions: Elisabeth Schwarz & Kurt Oppelt, Austria
- World Figure Skating Championships:
  - Men's champion: Hayes Alan Jenkins, United States
  - Ladies' champion: Carol Heiss, United States
  - Pair skating champions: Elisabeth Schwarz & Kurt Oppelt, Austria
  - Ice dancing champions: Pamela Weight & Paul Thomas (skater), Great Britain
- European Figure Skating Championships:
  - Men's champion: Alain Giletti, France
  - Ladies' champion: Ingrid Wendl, Austria
  - Pair skating champions: Elisabeth Schwarz & Kurt Oppelt, Austria
  - Ice dancing champions: Pamela Weight & Paul Thomas (skater), Great Britain

== Golf ==
Men's professional

- Masters Tournament – Jack Burke Jr.
- U.S. Open – Cary Middlecoff
- British Open – Peter Thomson
- PGA Championship – Jack Burke Jr.
- PGA Tour money leader – Ted Kroll – $72,836

Men's amateur

- British Amateur – John Beharrell
- U.S. Amateur – Harvie Ward

Women's professional

- Women's Western Open – Beverly Hanson
- LPGA Championship – Marlene Hagge
- U.S. Women's Open – Kathy Cornelius
- Titleholders Championship – Louise Suggs
- LPGA Tour money leader – Marlene Hagge – $20,235

== Harness racing ==
- The United States Pacing Triple Crown races is created with the addition of the Messenger Stakes.
  1. Cane Pace – Noble Adios
  2. Little Brown Jug – Noble Adios
  3. Messenger Stakes – Belle Acton
- United States Trotting Triple Crown races:
  1. Hambletonian – The Intruder
  2. Yonkers Trot – Add Hanover
  3. Kentucky Futurity – Scott Frost
- Australian Inter Dominion Harness Racing Championship:
  - Pacers: Gentlemen John

== Horse racing ==
Steeplechases

- Cheltenham Gold Cup – Limber Hill
- Grand National – ESB

Flat races

- Australia – Melbourne Cup won by Evening Peal
- Canada – Queen's Plate won by Canadian Champ
- France – Prix de l'Arc de Triomphe won by Ribot
- Ireland – Irish Derby Stakes won by Talgo
- English Triple Crown races:
  1. 2,000 Guineas Stakes – Gilles de Retz
  2. The Derby – Lavandin
  3. St. Leger Stakes – Cambremer
- United States Triple Crown races:
  1. May 5 – Kentucky Derby – Needles
  2. Preakness Stakes – Fabius
  3. Belmont Stakes – Needles

== Ice hockey ==
- Art Ross Trophy as the NHL's leading scorer during the regular season: Jean Beliveau, Montreal Canadiens
- Hart Memorial Trophy for the NHL's Most Valuable Player: Jean Beliveau, Montreal Canadiens
- Stanley Cup – Montreal Canadiens win 4 games to 1 over the Detroit Red Wings
- World Hockey Championship
  - Men's champion: Soviet Union defeated the United States
- NCAA Men's Ice Hockey Championship – University of Michigan Wolverines defeat Michigan Technological University Huskies 7–5 in Colorado Springs, Colorado
- HC Dukla Jihlava was founded in Vysocina Region, Czechoslovakia, present day of Czech Republic.

== Rugby league ==
- 1955–56 European Rugby League Championship
- 1956 New Zealand rugby league season
- 1956 NSWRFL season
- 1955–56 Northern Rugby Football League season / 1956–57 Northern Rugby Football League season
- 1956–57 Kangaroo tour of Great Britain and France

== Rugby union ==
- 62nd Five Nations Championship series is won by Wales
- New Zealand All Blacks defeats South African Springboks 3–1 in a Test series

== Snooker ==
- World Snooker Championship – Fred Davis beats John Pulman 38-35

== Tennis ==
Australia

- Australian Men's Singles Championship – Lew Hoad (Australia) defeats Ken Rosewall (Australia) 6–4, 3–6, 6–4, 7–5
- Australian Women's Singles Championship – Mary Carter Reitano (Australia) defeats Thelma Coyne Long (Australia) 3–6, 6–2, 9–7

England

- Wimbledon Men's Singles Championship – Lew Hoad (Australia) defeats Ken Rosewall (Australia) 6–2, 4–6, 7–5, 6–4
- Wimbledon Women's Singles Championship – Shirley Fry Irvin (USA) defeats Angela Buxton (Great Britain) 6–3, 6–1

France

- French Men's Singles Championship – Lew Hoad (Australia) defeats Sven Davidson (Sweden) 6–4, 8–6, 6–3
- French Women's Singles Championship – Althea Gibson (USA) defeats Angela Mortimer (Great Britain) 6–0, 12–10

USA

- American Men's Singles Championship – Ken Rosewall (Australia) defeats Lew Hoad (Australia) 4–6, 6–2, 6–3, 6–3
- American Women's Singles Championship – Shirley Fry Irvin (USA) defeats Althea Gibson (USA) 6–3, 6–4

Davis Cup

- 1956 Davis Cup – Australia 5–0 United States at Memorial Drive Tennis Centre (grass) Adelaide, Australia

== Volleyball ==
- Men's World Championship in Paris won by Czechoslovakia

== Olympic Games ==
- 1956 Summer Olympics takes place in Melbourne, Australia
  - Equestrian events take place in Stockholm, Sweden, due to Australian quarantine laws.
  - USSR wins the most medals (98), and the most gold medals (37).
- 1956 Winter Olympics takes place in Cortina d'Ampezzo, Italy
  - USSR wins the most medals (16), and the most gold medals (7).

== Sports venues ==
- July 30 – Luzhniki Stadium, well known sports venue of Russia and the Soviet Union, officially opens in Moscow.

== Awards ==
- Associated Press Male Athlete of the Year – Mickey Mantle, Major League Baseball
- Associated Press Female Athlete of the Year – Pat McCormick, Diving
