= 1953 World Figure Skating Championships =

Annual figure skating competition held in 1953

- Type: ISU Championship
- Date: February 8 – 15
- Season: 1953
- Location: Davos, Switzerland

Champions
- Men's singles: (United States) Hayes Alan Jenkins
- Ladies' singles: (United States) Tenley Albright
- Pairs: (United Kingdom) Jennifer Nicks / John Nicks
- Ice dance: (United Kingdom) Jean Westwood / Lawrence Demmy
- Previous: 1952 World Championships
- Next: 1954 World Championships

The World Figure Skating Championships is an annual figure skating competition sanctioned by the International Skating Union in which figure skaters compete for the title of World Champion.

The 1953 competitions for men, ladies, pair skating, and ice dancing took place from February 8 to 15 in Davos, Switzerland.

== Medal table ==
* Host nation (Switzerland)

Rank	Nation	Gold	Silver	Bronze	Total
1	Great Britain	2	1	1	4
1	United States	2	1	1	4
3	Canada	0	1	0	1
3	West Germany	0	1	0	1
5	Hungary	0	0	1	1
5	Italy	0	0	1	1
Totals (6 entries)		4	4	4	12

== Results ==
=== Men ===
Rank	Name	Age	CF		FS		Points	Places
1	(United States) Hayes Jenkins	19	2	925.2	1	727.2	183.6	13
2	(United States) James Grogan	21	1	931.9	3	704.3	181.8	16
3	(Italy) Carlo Fassi	24	3	907.1	6	659.8	174.1	36
4	(United States) Ronald Robertson	15	7	851.8	2	707.9	173.3	37
5	(France) Alain Giletti	13	5	864.7	4	675.2	171.4	44
6	(United States) Dudley Richards	21	6	870.6	5	673.8	171.6	49
7	(Canada) Peter Firstbrook	19	4	871.4	8	640.6	168.0	59
8	(Canada) Peter Dunfield	21	8	790.7	7	656.5	160.8	73
9	(United Kingdom) Michael Booker	15	9	778.4	9	622.9	155.7	81
10	(West Germany) Freimut Stein	28	10	764.4	10	609.9	152.7	88
11	(Austria) Kurt Oppelt	20	13	712.8	11	592.2	145.0	102
12	(Switzerland) Hubert Köpfler	17	11	745.4	12	553.3	144.3	106
13	(Hungary) György Czakó	19	14	701.6	13	543.1	138.3	115
WD	(West Germany) Klaus Loichinger		12	729.5				DNF

Judges:

- (Italy) Ercole Cattaneo
- (United Kingdom) Pamela Davis
- (Canada) John D. Greig
- (Belgium) Henri Hoyoux
- (Switzerland) A. Jaisli
- (United States) Alex Krupy
- (Austria) Hans Meixner
- (France) Gérard Rodrigues-Henriques
- (West Germany) Adolf Walker

=== Ladies ===
Rank	Name	Age	CF		FS		Total	Points	Places
1	(United States) Tenley Albright	17	1	757.3	1	560.73	1318.03	188.29	7
2	(West Germany) Gundi Busch	17	2	730.9	3	531.27	1262.17	180.31	16
3	(United Kingdom) Valda Osborn	18	3	719.7		513.77	1233.47	176.21	28
4	(United States) Carol Heiss	13	5	705.4	2	531.29	1236.69	176.67	27
5	(Canada) Suzanne Morrow	22	4	716.7		516.63	1233.33	176.19	28
6	(Canada) Vera Smith	20					1198.68	171.24	48
7	(United States) Margaret Graham						1189.79	169.97	49
8	(United Kingdom) Yvonne Sugden	13					1175.51	167.93	53
9	(United Kingdom) Erica Batchelor	19					1145.62	163.66	70
10	(United Kingdom) Ann Robinson						1141.28	163.04	74
11	(Austria) Annelies Schilhan	16	12	642.1		499.11	1141.21	163.03	72
12	(Canada) Mary Kenner	19							86
13	(United Kingdom) Norma Skevington								83
14	(West Germany) Rosi Pettinger	19							97
15	(Switzerland) Doris Zerbe								109
16	(United States) Margaret Dean								112
17	(Switzerland) Yolande Jobin	22							112
18	(Hungary) Eszter Jurek	16							129
19	(Netherlands) Lidy Stoppelman	19							130
WD	(West Germany) Helga Dudzinski	23							DNF
WD	(Austria) Sissy Schwarz	16							DNF

Judges:

- (Canada) John D. Greig
- (Switzerland) A. Jaisli
- (United States) Alex Krupy
- (Austria) Ernst Labin
- (United Kingdom) Mollie Phillips
- (France) Gérard Rodrigues-Henriques
- (West Germany) Adolf Walker

=== Pairs ===
Rank	Name	Age	Total	Points	Places
1	(United Kingdom) Jennifer Nicks / John Nicks	20/23	77.0	11.00	10.5
2	(Canada) Frances Dafoe / Norris Bowden	23/26	76.37	10.91	16
3	(Hungary) Marianna Nagy / László Nagy	24/25	74.62	10.66	23.5
4	(Switzerland) Silvia Grandjean / Michel Grandjean	18/21	74.27	10.61	24
5	(United Kingdom) Peri Horne / Raymond Lockwood	20/24	71.40	10.20	39
6	(Austria) Sissy Schwarz / Kurt Oppelt	16/20	70.14	10.02	43.5
7	(United Kingdom) Jane Higson / Robert Hudson		70.07	10.01	44.5
8	(Hungary) Éva Szöllősi / Gábor Vida	18/23	67.48	9.64	57
9	(West Germany) Eva Neeb / Karl Probst	19/	66.78	9.54	61
10	(Belgium) Charlotte Michiels / Gaston van Ghelder		65.88	9.34	66

Judges:

- (United Kingdom) Pauline L. Barrajo
- (Switzerland) Emile Finsterwald
- (Canada) John D. Greig
- (Belgium) Henri Hoyoux
- (Austria) Walter Malek
- (West Germany) Werner Rittberger
- (Hungary) Elemér Terták

=== Ice dance ===
Rank	Name	Age	CD		FD		Points	Places
1	(United Kingdom) Jean Westwood / Lawrence Demmy	22/22	1	111.4	1	73.85	37.05	6
2	(United Kingdom) Joan Dewhirst / John Slater	17/25	2	110.0	2	73.05	36.61	10
3	(United States) Carol Peters / Daniel Ryan	20/23	3	104.4	3	70.7	35.02	14
4	(United Kingdom) Nesta Davies / Paul Thomas		5	102.6	4	68.0	34.12	20
5	(United States) Virginia Hoyns / Donald Jacoby		4	101.0	6	67.45	33.69	23
6	(Netherlands) Lydia Boon / Aadrian van Dam		6	96.9	7	66.7	32.72	30
7	(United States) Carmel Bodel / Edward Bodel	40/32	7	88.9	5	67.85	31.35	35
8	(Switzerland) Albertina Brown / Nigel Brown		8	83.0	9	61.1	28.82	42
9	(Austria) Helga Binder / Edwin Führich		10	81.8	8	61.5	28.66	45
10	(Netherlands) Catharina Odink / Jacobus Odink		9	83.7	12	55.0	27.74	50
11	(Austria) Lucia Fischer / Rudolf Zorn		11	82.0	11	55.4	27.48	54
12	(Austria) Luise Lehner / Hans Kutschera		12	76.5	10	55.9	26.48	59

Judges:

- (United Kingdom) Pamela Davis
- (Switzerland) Emile Finsterwald
- (Austria) Hans Meixner
- (United States) R. Sackett
- (Belgium) A. Voordeckers

== Sources ==
- Result List provided by the ISU
