= 1954 World Figure Skating Championships =

Annual figure skating competition held in 1954

- Type: ISU Championship
- Date: February 16 – 19
- Season: 1954
- Location: Oslo, Norway

Champions
- Men's singles: (United States) Hayes Alan Jenkins
- Ladies' singles: (West Germany) Gundi Busch
- Pairs: (Canada) Frances Dafoe / Norris Bowden
- Ice dance: (United Kingdom) Jean Westwood / Lawrence Demmy
- Previous: 1953 World Championships
- Next: 1955 World Championships

The World Figure Skating Championships is an annual figure skating competition sanctioned by the International Skating Union in which figure skaters compete for the title of World Champion.

The 1954 competitions for men, ladies, pair skating, and ice dancing took place from February 16 to 19 in Oslo, Norway.

== Medal table ==
* Host nation (Norway)

Rank	Nation	Gold	Silver	Bronze	Total
1	United States	1	2	1	4
2	Great Britain	1	1	1	3
3	Canada	1	0	0	1
3	West Germany	1	0	0	1
5	Switzerland	0	1	0	1
6	Austria	0	0	1	1
6	France	0	0	1	1
Totals (7 entries)		4	4	4	12

== Results ==
=== Men ===
Rank	Name	Places
1	(United States) Hayes Jenkins	5
2	(United States) James Grogan	12
3	(France) Alain Giletti	18
4	(United States) David Jenkins	20
5	(United States) Ronald Robertson	23
6	(United Kingdom) Michael Booker	35
7	(Canada) Charles Snelling	33
8	(Canada) Peter Dunfield	44
9	(Austria) Norbert Felsinger	43
10	(Canada) Douglas Court	45
11	(France) Alain Calmat	52

Judges:

- (France) Jacques Favart
- (United Kingdom) Alexander Gordon
- (Austria) Hans Meixner
- (Canada) Melville Rogers
- (United States) Harold G. Storke

=== Ladies ===
Rank	Name	Places
1	(West Germany) Gundi Busch	9
2	(United States) Tenley Albright	12
3	(United Kingdom) Erica Batchelor	26
4	(Canada) Barbara Gratton	28
5	(United States) Frances Dorsey	45
6	(United Kingdom) Yvonne Sugden	52
7	(Austria) Hanna Eigel	55
8	(Canada) Yarmila Pachl	60
9	(Canada) Ann Johnston	62
10	(Canada) Sonja Currie	63
11	(United States) Margaret Graham	58
12	(Austria) Ingrid Wendl	89
13	(West Germany) Rosi Pettinger	88
14	(West Germany) Erika Rücker	100
15	(United States) Margaret Dean	104
16	(United Kingdom) Clema Cowley	108
17	(Italy) Fiorella Negro	113
18	(Sweden) Ally Lundström	130
19	(Sweden) Gun Ericson-Mothander	132
20	(Norway) Ingeborg Nilsson	136

Judges:

- (Italy) Bruno Bonfiglio
- (West Germany) F. Grimminger
- (Austria) Franz Heinlein
- (Norway) Per Reinertsen
- (Canada) Melville Rogers
- (United States) Harold G. Storke
- (United Kingdom) J. Wilson

=== Pairs ===
Rank	Name	Places
1	(Canada) Frances Dafoe / Norris Bowden	9.5
2	(Switzerland) Silvia Grandjean / Michel Grandjean	17.5
3	(Austria) Sissy Schwarz / Kurt Oppelt	21
4	(United States) Carole Ormaca / Robin Greiner	30.5
5	(United States) Margaret Graham / Hugh Graham	41.5
6	(West Germany) Alice Zettel / Klaus Loichinger	45
7	(West Germany) Inge Minor / Hermann Braun	45
8	(United Kingdom) Jane Higson / Robert Hudson	46
9	(Sweden) Britta Lindmark / Ulf Berendt	62
10	(Norway) Bjørg Skjælaaen / Johannes Thorsen	67

Judges:

- (United Kingdom) Pamela Davis
- (West Germany) F. Grimminger
- (Austria) Hans Grünauer
- (Sweden) B. Holmberg
- (Switzerland) Eugen Kirchhofer
- (Canada) Melville Rogers
- (United States) Harold G. Storke

=== Ice dance ===
Rank	Name	Places
1	(United Kingdom) Jean Westwood / Lawrence Demmy	5
2	(United Kingdom) Nesta Davies / Paul Thomas	14
3	(United States) Carmel Bodel / Edward Bodel	18
4	(United Kingdom) Barbara Radford / Raymond Lockwood	20
5	(United States) Virginia Hoyns / Donald Jacoby	23
6	(United States) Phyllis Forney / Martin Forney	25
7	(Austria) Edith Peikert / Hans Kutschera	35

Judges:

- (United Kingdom) Pamela Davis
- (United States) M. Drake
- (Switzerland) Eugen Kirchhofer
- (Austria) Hans Meixner
- (France) Henri Meudec

== Sources ==
- Result List provided by the ISU
