= 1954 in sports =

1954 in sports describes the year's events in world sport.

== American football ==
- NFL Championship: the Cleveland Browns won 56–10 over the Detroit Lions at Cleveland Stadium
- Orange Bowl (1953 season):
  - The Maryland Terrapins lose 7–0 to the Oklahoma Sooners; still voted national champions by the AP and Coaches Poll

== Artistic gymnastics ==
- 1954 World Championships
  - Men's all-around champion – Viktor Chukarin, USSR
  - Women's all-around champion – Galina Rud'ko, USSR
  - Team competition champions – men's – USSR; women's – USSR

== Association football ==
FIFA World Cup

- 1954 World Cup held in Switzerland. West Germany beat Hungary 3–2.

England

- First Division – Wolverhampton Wanderers win the 1953–54 title.
- FA Cup – West Bromwich Albion beat Preston North End 3–2.

Spain

- La Liga won by Real Madrid

Italy

- Serie A won by F.C. Internazionale Milano

West Germany

- German football championship won by Hannover 96

France

- French Division 1 won by Lille OSC

Portugal

- Primeira Liga won by Sporting C.P.

Other events

- May 8 – The Asian Football Confederation is founded in Manila.
- June 15 – UEFA is founded in Basel.

== Athletics ==
- May 6 – Roger Bannister breaks the four-minute mile barrier with a time of 3:59.4
- August 25 to 29 August – European Championships held at Berne, capital of Switzerland

== Australian rules football ==
- Victorian Football League
  - 5 June: Champion Essendon full-forward John Coleman has his career ended by a serious knee injury
  - Footscray wins the 58th VFL Premiership by defeating Melbourne 15.12 (102) to 7.9 (51) in the Grand Final.
  - Brownlow Medal awarded to Roy Wright (Richmond)
- South Australian National Football League
  - Port Adelaide begins a record run of six consecutive SANFL premierships by beating West Adelaide 11.13 (79) to 10.16 (76) in a highly controversial Grand Final.
  - Magarey Medal won by Len Fitzgerald (Sturt)
- West Australian National Football League
  - South Fremantle wins its third successive premiership and eighth overall beating East Fremantle 21.14 (140) to 9.8 (62).
  - Sandover Medal awarded to Merv McIntosh (Perth)

== Baseball ==
- January 14 – Former Yankees great Joe DiMaggio marries actress Marilyn Monroe in a union of heavily publicized media stars.
- St. Louis Browns move to Baltimore, Maryland, becoming the new Baltimore Orioles.
- World Series – New York Giants win 4 games to 0 over the Cleveland Indians

== Basketball ==
- FIBA World Championship –
  - Gold: United States
  - Silver: Brazil
  - Bronze: Philippines
- NCAA Men's Basketball Championship –
  - La Salle wins 92–76 over Bradley
- NBA Finals –
  - Minneapolis Lakers win 4–3 over the Syracuse Nationals
- March 13 – Milan High School, enrollment 161, defeated Muncie Central High School (enrollment over 1,600) 32–30 to win the Indiana state title. The 1986 movie classic Hoosiers was very loosely based on the story of this Milan team.

== Boxing ==
- June 17 – Rocky Marciano defeats Ezzard Charles by unanimous decision to retain his World Heavyweight title
- September 17 in New York City, Rocky Marciano retained his World Heavyweight title with an 8th-round knockout of Ezzard Charles
- December 12 – death of Ed Sanders (24), American heavyweight soon after a fight with Willie James in which he lost consciousness

== Canadian football ==
- The BC Lions started play in the Western Interprovincial Football Union as the ninth professional team.
- After the 1954 season, the Ontario Rugby Football Union stops challenging for the Grey Cup, permanently establishing that trophy as one to be awarded only to professional teams.
- These changes result in the Grey Cup being an East vs. West competition. Although the Canadian Football League was not technically founded until 1958, 1954 is often referred to as the start of the "modern era" of Canadian professional football. It is also considered to be the year the CFL was founded in substance if not in name.
- In the Grey Cup, the Edmonton Eskimos win 26–25 over the Montreal Alouettes.
- The Canadian Intermediate-Senior championship was awarded to the Winnipeg Rams. The team consisted of Rich Kolisnyk (quarterback), Mel Kotch, Bob Jones, Tom Brisson, Bill Ritchie, Len Sigurdson, Walt Van Wynsberg, Lorne Miller, Gerry Duguid, Harry Makin, Art Makin, Jerry Lavitt, John Thorney, Bill Barrett, Jim Thorney, Al McBride, Bill Senyk, Bob Bouchard, Ray Charambura, Nick Miller, Dick Hebertson, Ron Stephenson, Al Passman, Mort Corrin, Bill Yee, Norm Lampe, Dede Brown, Joe Sawchuk, Art Brockhill, Lew Miles, Ken Freeman, Bill Thomas, Ron Cooke, Pete Sawchuk, Harry Snider, Harold Neufeld and their mascot Ken Kolisnyk.

== Figure skating ==
- World Figure Skating Championships –
  - Men's champion: Hayes Alan Jenkins, United States
  - Ladies’ champion: Gundi Busch, Germany
  - Pair skating champions: Frances Dafoe & Norris Bowden, Canada
  - Ice dancing champions: Jean Westwood & Lawrence Demmy, Great Britain

== Golf ==
Men's professional

- Masters Tournament – Sam Snead
- U.S. Open – Ed Furgol
- British Open – Peter Thomson
- PGA Championship – Chick Harbert
- PGA Tour money leader – Bob Toski – $65,820

Men's amateur

- British Amateur – Doug Bachli
- U.S. Amateur – Arnold Palmer

Women's professional

- Women's Western Open – Betty Jameson
- U.S. Women's Open – Babe Zaharias
- Titleholders Championship – Louise Suggs
- LPGA Tour money leader – Patty Berg – $16,011

== Harness racing ==
- Little Brown Jug for pacers won by Adios Harry
- Hambletonian for trotters won by Newport Dream
- Australian Inter Dominion Harness Racing Championship –
  - Pacers: Tennessee Sky

== Horse racing ==
Steeplechases

- Cheltenham Gold Cup – Four Ten
- Grand National – Royal Tan

Hurdle races

- Champion Hurdle – Sir Ken

Flat races

- Australia – Melbourne Cup won by Rising Fast
- Canada – Queen's Plate won by Collisteo
- France – Prix de l'Arc de Triomphe won by Sica Boy
- Ireland – Irish Derby Stakes won by Zarathustra
- English Triple Crown Races:
  1. 2,000 Guineas Stakes – Darius
  2. The Derby – Never Say Die
  3. St. Leger Stakes – Never Say Die
- United States Triple Crown Races:
  1. Kentucky Derby – Determine
  2. Preakness Stakes – Hasty Road
  3. Belmont Stakes – High Gun

== Ice hockey ==
- Art Ross Trophy as the NHL's leading scorer during the regular season: Gordie Howe, Detroit Red Wings
- Hart Memorial Trophy for the NHL's Most Valuable Player: Al Rollins, Chicago Black Hawks
- Stanley Cup – Detroit Red Wings win 4 games to 3 over the Montreal Canadiens
- World Hockey Championship
  - Men's champion: USSR wins 7–2 over Canada's East York Lyndhursts.
- NCAA Men's Ice Hockey Championship – Rensselaer Polytechnic Institute Engineers defeat University of Minnesota Golden Gophers 5–4 in overtime in Colorado Springs, Colorado

== Rugby league ==
- May 5 – 1953–54 Challenge Cup Final replay is won 8–4 by Warrington against Halifax before a world record crowd for a rugby football match of either code of over 120,000 at Odsal Stadium.
- May 8 – 1953–54 Northern Rugby Football League season culminates in Warrington's 8–7 win over Halifax in the Championship Final at Maine Road before 36,519.
- September 18 – 1954 NSWRFL season culminates in South Sydney's 23–15 win over Newtown in the grand final at the Sydney Cricket Ground before a crowd of 45,759
- November 13 – first World Cup tournament culminates in Great Britain's 16 – 12 win over France in the final.
- December 13 – the final match of the 1953–54 European Championship was played, with England finishing on top of the tournament ladder to claim the championship.
- 1954 Great Britain Lions tour

== Rugby union ==
- 60th Five Nations Championship series is shared by England, France and Wales. This is the first time that France either wins or shares the title.

== Skiing ==
- FIS World Ski Championships –
  - Men's combined champion: Stein Eriksen, Norway
  - Women's combined champion: Ida Schöpfer, Switzerland

== Snooker ==
- World Snooker Championship – Fred Davis beats Walter Donaldson 39-21

== Tennis ==
Australia

- Australian Men's Singles Championship – Mervyn Rose (Australia) defeats Rex Hartwig (Australia) 6–2, 0–6, 6–4, 6–2
- Australian Women's Singles Championship – Thelma Coyne Long (Australia) defeats Jenny Staley Hoad (Australia) 6–3, 6–4

England

- Wimbledon Men's Singles Championship – Jaroslav Drobný (Egypt) defeats Ken Rosewall (Australia) 13–11, 4–6, 6–2, 9–7
- Wimbledon Women's Singles Championship – Maureen Connolly Brinker (USA) defeats Louise Brough Clapp (USA) 6–2, 7–5

France

- French Men's Singles Championship – Tony Trabert (USA) defeats Arthur Larsen (USA) 6–4, 7–5, 6–1
- French Women's Singles Championship – Maureen Connolly (USA) defeats Ginette Bucaille (France) 6–4, 6–1

USA

- American Men's Singles Championship – Vic Seixas (USA) defeats Rex Hartwig (Australia) 3–6, 6–2, 6–4, 6–4
- American Women's Singles Championship – Doris Hart (USA) defeats Louise Brough (USA) 6–8, 6–1, 8–6

Davis Cup

- 1954 Davis Cup – United States 3–2 Australia at White City Stadium (grass) Sydney, Australia

== Multi-sport events ==
- Asian Games held in Manila, the Philippines
- Central American and Caribbean Games held in Mexico City, Mexico
- 1954 British Empire and Commonwealth Games held in Vancouver, Canada

== Awards ==
- Associated Press Male Athlete of the Year – Willie Mays, Major League Baseball
- Associated Press Female Athlete of the Year – Babe Didrikson Zaharias, LPGA golf
