= 1954 European Figure Skating Championships =

Figure skating competition

1954 European Championships
- Type: ISU Championship
- Date: January 28 – 31
- Season: 1953–54
- Location: Bolzano, Italy

Champions
- Men's singles: (Italy) Carlo Fassi
- Ladies' singles: (West Germany) Gundi Busch
- Pairs: (Switzerland) Silvia Grandjean / Michel Grandjean
- Ice dance: (United Kingdom) Jean Westwood / Laurence Demmy
- Previous: 1953 European Championships
- Next: 1955 European Championships

The 1954 European Figure Skating Championships were held in Bolzano, Italy from January 28 to 31. Elite senior-level figure skaters from European ISU member nations competed for the title of European Champion in the disciplines of men's singles, ladies' singles, pair skating, and ice dancing.

== Results ==
=== Men ===
Rank	Name	Places
1	(Italy) Carlo Fassi	
2	(France) Alain Giletti	
3	(Czechoslovakia) Karol Divín	
4	(United Kingdom) Michael Booker	
5	(France) Alain Calmat	
6	(Austria) Norbert Felsinger	
7	(Czechoslovakia) Zdeněk Fikar	
8	(Austria) Hanno Ströher	
9	(Switzerland) François Pache	
10	(Switzerland) Hans Müller	
11	(West Germany) Werner Kronemann	
12	(East Germany) Kurt Weilert	

=== Ladies ===
Rank	Name	Places
1	(West Germany) Gundi Busch	
2	(United Kingdom) Erica Batchelor	
3	(United Kingdom) Yvonne Sugden	
4	(Austria) Annelies Schilhan	
5	(Austria) Ingrid Wendl	
6	(Austria) Hanna Eigel	
7	(United Kingdom) Clema Cowley	
8	(Czechoslovakia) Miloslava Tumová	
9	(Austria) Hanna Walter	
10	(Netherlands) Nelly Maas	
11	(West Germany) Rosi Pettinger	
12	(Czechoslovakia) Dagmar Lerchová	
13	(Netherlands) Lidy Stoppelman	
14	(Italy) Fiorella Negro	
15	(West Germany) Erika Rücker	
16	(West Germany) Lilo Kürzinger	
17	(Switzerland) Alice Fischer	
18	(Netherlands) Joan Haanappel	
19	(Netherlands) Sjoukje Dijkstra	
20	(France) Christianne Moreux	
21	(Italy) Luisella Gaspari	
22	(Italy) Manuela Angeli	

=== Pairs ===
Rank	Name	Places
1	(Switzerland) Silvia Grandjean / Michel Grandjean	
2	(Austria) Sissy Schwarz / Kurt Oppelt	
3	(Czechoslovakia) Soňa Balunová / Miloslav Balun	
4	(East Germany) Vera Kuhrüber / Horst Kuhrüber	
5	(West Germany) Alice Zettel / Klaus Loichinger	
6	(United Kingdom) Jane Higson / Robert Hudson	
7	(West Germany) Inge Minor / Hermann Braun	
8	(West Germany) Eva Neeb / Karl Probst	

=== Ice dance ===
Rank	Name	Places
1	(United Kingdom) Jean Westwood / Laurence Demmy	
2	(United Kingdom) Nesta Davies / Paul Thomas	
3	(United Kingdom) Barbara Radford / Raymond Lockwood	
4	(Italy) Bona Giammona / Giancarlo Sioli	
5	(Austria) Edith Peikert / Hans Kutschera	
6	(France) Fanny Besson / Jean Guhel	
7	(Austria) Helga Binder / Edwin Führich	
8	(Netherlands) Catharina Odink / Jacobus Odink	
9	(Austria) Lucia Fischer / Rudolf Zorn	
10	(France) Claude Weinstein / Claude Lambert	
11	(Italy) Adriana Giuggiolini / Germano Ceccattini	
12	(Switzerland) Albertine Brown / Nigel Brown	
