= 1953 European Figure Skating Championships =

Figure skating competition

1953 European Championships
- Type: ISU Championship
- Date: 22 – 25 January
- Season: 1952–53
- Location: Dortmund, West Germany

Champions
- Men's singles: (Italy) Carlo Fassi
- Ladies' singles: (United Kingdom) Valda Osborn
- Pairs: (United Kingdom) Jennifer Nicks / John Nicks
- Previous: 1952 European Championships
- Next: 1954 European Championships

The 1953 European Figure Skating Championships were held in Dortmund, West Germany from 22 to 25 January. Elite senior-level figure skaters from European ISU member nations competed for the title of European Champion in the disciplines of men's singles, ladies' singles, and pair skating.

== Results ==
=== Men ===
Rank	Name	Places
1	(Italy) Carlo Fassi	
2	(France) Alain Giletti	
3	(West Germany) Freimut Stein	
4	(United Kingdom) Michael Booker	
5	(Switzerland) Hubert Köpfler	
6	(Austria) Martin Felsenreich	
7	(West Germany) Klaus Loichinger	
8	(Hungary) György Czakó	
WD	(Austria) Kurt Oppelt	DNS

=== Ladies ===
Rank	Name	Places
1	(United Kingdom) Valda Osborn	
2	(West Germany) Gundi Busch	
3	(United Kingdom) Erica Batchelor	
4	(West Germany) Helga Dudzinski	
5	(United Kingdom) Yvonne Sugden	
6	(Austria) Annelies Schilhan	
7	(West Germany) Rosi Pettinger	
8	(United Kingdom) Elaine Skevington	
9	(Netherlands) Lidy Stoppelman	
10	(Austria) Sissy Schwarz	
11	(Netherlands) Nelly Maas	
12	(Switzerland) Doris Zerbe	
13	(Italy) Fiorella Negro	
14	(Netherlands) Joan Haanappel	
15	(Belgium) Liliane de Becker	
16	(West Germany) Erika Rücker	
17	(Hungary) Eszter Jurek	

=== Pairs ===
Rank	Name	Places
1	(United Kingdom) Jennifer Nicks / John Nicks	
2	(Hungary) Marianna Nagy / László Nagy	11.5
3	(Austria) Sissy Schwarz / Kurt Oppelt	
4	(United Kingdom) Jane Higson / Robert Hudson	
5	(West Germany) Eva Neeb / Karl Probst	
6	(West Germany) Helga Krüger / Peter Voss	
7	(Belgium) Charlotte Michiels / Gaston van Ghelder	
