= Figure skating at the 1956 Winter Olympics – Pair skating =

Figure skating at the Olympics

Pair skating at the VII Olympic Winter Games
- Dates: 3-4 February 1956
- Competitors: 22 from 11 nations

Medalists
1st place, gold medalist(s)		Sissy Schwarz / Kurt Oppelt; Austria
2nd place, silver medalist(s)		Frances Dafoe / Norris Bowden; Canada
3rd place, bronze medalist(s)		Marianna Nagy / László Nagy; Hungary

The figure skating pairs competition at the 1956 Winter Olympics took place on 3–4 February. The Austrian pair of Sissy Schwarz / Kurt Oppelt won the competition. Pairs from Canada and Hungary took second and third respectively. The pairs competition was the last figure skating event of the Olympics. It was held out doors at the Olympic Ice Stadium in Cortina d'Ampezzo, Italy, the host city for the Games.

== Results ==
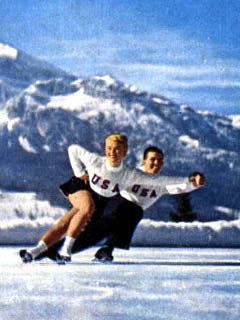
Lucille Ash and Sully Kothmann representing the United States at the 1956 Winter Olympics.

Rank	Name	Nation	Points	Places
1	Sissy Schwarz / Kurt Oppelt	Austria	11.31	14
2	Frances Dafoe / Norris Bowden	Canada	11.32	16
3	Marianna Nagy / László Nagy	Hungary	11.03	32
4	Marika Kilius / Franz Ningel	United Team of Germany	10.98	35.5
5	Carole Ann Ormaca / Robin Greiner	United States	10.71	56
6	Barbara Wagner / Robert Paul	Canada	10.74	54.5
7	Lucille Ash / Sully Kothmann	United States	10.63	59.5
8	Věra Suchánková / Zdeněk Doležal	Czechoslovakia	10.53	68.5
9	Elisabeth Ellend / Konrad Lienert	Austria	10.38	77
10	Joyce Coates / Anthony Holles	Great Britain	10.00	88
11	Patricia Krau / Rodney Ward	Great Britain	9.86	93

== See also ==
- List of IOC country codes
- 1956 Winter Olympics
