= Sissy Schwarz =

Austrian figure skater

Personal information
- Full name: Elisabeth Schwarz
- Other names: Schwarz-Bollenberger
- Born: 19 May 1936 (age 90) Vienna, Austria

Figure skating career
- Country: Austria
- Retired: 1956
Medal record
Representing Austria
Pairs' Figure skating
Olympic Games
Gold medal – first place	1956 Cortina d'Ampezzo	Pairs
World Championships
Gold medal – first place	1956 Garmisch-Partenkirchen	Pairs
Silver medal – second place	1955 Vienna	Pairs
Bronze medal – third place	1954 Oslo	Pairs
European Championships
Gold medal – first place	1956 Paris	Pairs
Silver medal – second place	1954 Bolzano	Pairs
Bronze medal – third place	1953 Davos	Pairs

Elisabeth "Sissy" Schwarz (born 19 May 1936) is an Austrian former figure skater who is best known for her career in pair skating. With Kurt Oppelt, she is the 1956 Olympic champion, the 1956 World champion, the 1956 European champion, and a five-time Austrian national champion (1952–56).

== Skating career ==
=== Single skating ===
Schwarz competed in single skating for a few years. She took the silver medal at the 1952 Austrian Championships, placed 19th at the 1952 Winter Olympics, and finished ninth at the 1953 European Championships. She never competed at the World Championships as a singles skater.

=== Pair skating ===
Her partner in pair skating was Kurt Oppelt. In 1952, they won their first national title and were sent to their first European Championships, where they placed seventh. The pair then competed at the 1952 Winter Olympics in Oslo, Norway, where they placed ninth, and at the 1952 World Championships, finishing seventh.

Schwarz/Oppelt stepped onto the European podium for the first time at the 1953 European Championships, where they won the bronze medal, and then placed sixth at the World Championships. In 1954, they became European silver medalists and went on to win their first World medal, bronze, at the 1954 World Championships. They followed it up with silver at the 1955 World Championships, finishing as close runners-up to Canada's Frances Dafoe / Norris Bowden, who took their second World title.

After winning the Austrian national title for the fifth consecutive year, Schwarz/Oppelt became the 1956 European champions. They then competed at the 1956 Winter Olympics in Cortina d'Ampezzo, Italy. Skating to Banditenstreiche by Franz von Suppé, they won the gold medal ahead of Dafoe/Bowden, who faltered on a lift, causing them to finish after their music ended. The judging panel was split 6 to 3 in favor of Schwarz/Oppelt.

Schwarz/Oppelt went on to win the 1956 World title before retiring from competition. In the summer of 1956, they joined the Wiener Eisrevue and performed in ice shows for three or four years.

=== Later years ===
In 1968, she decided to open a skating club in Wiener Neustadt and worked with Rudolf Lang to build a skating rink.

== Personal life ==
Schwarz married a lawyer and became known as Schwarz-Bollenberger. She has three children and lives in Wiener Neustadt.

== Results ==
=== Pairs with Oppelt ===
International
Event	1952	1953	1954	1955	1956
Winter Olympics	9th				1st
World Championships	7th	6th	3rd	2nd	1st
European Championships	7th	3rd	2nd		1st
National
Austrian Championships	1st	1st	1st	1st	1st

=== Single skating ===
International
Event	1952	1953
Winter Olympics	19th	
European Championships		9th
National
Austrian Championships	2nd	
