= Kurt Oppelt =

Austrian figure skater (1932–2015)

Personal information
- Born: March 18, 1932 Vienna, Austria
- Died: September 16, 2015 (aged 83) Orlando, Florida, U.S.

Figure skating career
- Country: Austria
- Retired: 1956
Medal record
Representing Austria
Pairs' Figure skating
Olympic Games
Gold medal – first place	1956 Cortina d'Ampezzo	Pairs
World Championships
Gold medal – first place	1956 Garmisch-Partenkirchen	Pairs
Silver medal – second place	1955 Vienna	Pairs
Bronze medal – third place	1954 Oslo	Pairs
European Championships
Gold medal – first place	1956 Paris	Pairs
Silver medal – second place	1954 Bolzano	Pairs
Bronze medal – third place	1953 Davos	Pairs

Kurt Oppelt (March 18, 1932 – September 16, 2015) was an Austrian figure skater who is best known for his career in pair skating. With Sissy Schwarz, he is the 1956 Olympic champion, the 1956 World champion, the 1956 European champion, and a five-time Austrian national champion (1952–56).

== Career ==
=== Single skating ===
Oppelt started his career as a singles skater, taking bronze at the Austrian Championships in 1951–52 and silver in 1953. He placed 11th both at the 1952 Olympics and at the 1953 World Championships.

=== Pair skating ===
Oppelt's partner in pair skating was Sissy Schwarz. In 1952, they won their first national title and were sent to their first European Championships, where they placed seventh. The pair then competed at the 1952 Winter Olympics in Oslo, Norway, where they placed ninth, and at the 1952 World Championships, finishing seventh.

Schwarz/Oppelt stepped onto the European podium for the first time at the 1953 European Championships, where they won the bronze medal, and then placed sixth at the World Championships. In 1954, they became European silver medalists and went on to win their first World medal, bronze, at the 1954 World Championships. They followed it up with silver at the 1955 World Championships, finishing as close runners-up to Canada's Frances Dafoe / Norris Bowden, who took their second World title.

After winning the Austrian national title for the fifth consecutive year, Schwarz/Oppelt became the 1956 European champions. They then competed at the 1956 Winter Olympics in Cortina d'Ampezzo, Italy. Skating to Banditenstreiche by Franz von Suppé, they won the gold medal ahead of Dafoe/Bowden, who faltered on a lift, causing them to finish after their music ended. The judging panel was split 6 to 3 in favor of Schwarz/Oppelt.

Schwarz/Oppelt went on to win the 1956 World title before retiring from competition. In the summer of 1956, they joined the Wiener Eisrevue and performed in ice shows for three or four years.

== Later life ==
Oppelt was the coach of the Royal Dutch figure skating team from 1957–60. He later settled in the United States. Beginning in 1967, Oppelt was an instructor at the Pennsylvania State University in its College of Health, Physical Education and Recreation. He was inducted into Austrian Olympic Hall of Fame in 1976. In 1996, he received the Golden Medal of Honor for Services to the Republic of Austria.

With his wife Cathleen, he has two sons, Kurt and Christopher, born in the 1970s.

== Results ==
=== Pairs with Schwarz ===
International
Event	1952	1953	1954	1955	1956
Winter Olympics	9th				1st
World Championships	7th	6th	3rd	2nd	1st
European Championships	7th	3rd	2nd		1st
National
Austrian Championships	1st	1st	1st	1st	1st

=== Single skating ===
International
Event	1951	1952	1953
Winter Olympics		11th	
World Championships			11th
European Championships			WD
National
Austrian Championships	3rd	3rd	2nd
WD = Withdrew

== See also ==
- List of Pennsylvania State University Olympians
