= Carole Jane Pachl =

Canadian figure skater (born 1938)

Personal information
- Other names: Carole Jane Pachl; Yarmila
- Born: Prague, Czechoslovakia

Figure skating career
- Country: Canada
- Skating club: Minto Skating Club; Montreal WC
- Retired: 1957
Medal record
Representing Canada
Figure skating: Ladies' singles
North American Championships
Silver medal – second place	1957 Rochester	Ladies' singles

Carole Jane (Yarmila) Pachl, (born December 23, 1938) is a Canadian former figure skater. She is the 1957 North American silver medallist and a three-time Canadian national champion. She competed at the 1956 Winter Olympics.

== Personal life ==
Carole Jane (Yarmila) Pachl was born in Prague, Czechoslovakia. Her mother, Jarmila née Pošíková, was an actress, while her father, Jan Pachl, was a wealthy chocolate manufacturer. Her brother, Rudy, was born a year later. By this time, Nazi Germany had begun its occupation of Czechoslovakia and World War II ensued. Her father, having opposed the Nazis, was imprisoned in a concentration camp and then, following the war, had most of his assets seized by the Communists.

Pachl and her mother resided for some time in England and St. Moritz, Switzerland, before the whole family moved to Montreal, Quebec, Canada. After becoming a naturalized Canadian citizen at age ten, four years ahead of the rest of her family, she moved to Lake Placid, New York, where she lived with an American family.

== Career ==
Pachl enjoyed watching figure skating and began practicing seriously at the age of eight after her mother brought her before Swiss coach Arnold Gerschwiler in England. In early 1947, she relocated to St. Moritz, Switzerland, where Gerschwiler continued coaching her.

After her family moved to Canada, Pachl trained in Montreal. Her club's president sponsored her early Canadian citizenship so that she could be sent to Lake Placid, New York to train under Gus Lussi when she was ten years old. She originally competed as Yarmila Pachl.

Pachl represented Montreal WC until 1952–53 and then joined the Minto Skating Club in Ottawa. She was coached by Otto Gold in Ottawa from around 1952. In 1953, she became the Canadian national bronze medallist on both the junior and senior levels. She finished sixth at the 1953 North American Championships in Cleveland and eighth at the 1954 World Championships in Oslo, Norway.

In 1955, Pachl won her first national title and went on to place fourth at the North American Championships and sixth at the World Championships in Vienna. She repeated as the national champion the following season and was named in Canada's team to the 1956 Winter Olympics in Cortina d'Ampezzo, Italy, where she placed sixth.

In 1957, her final competitive season, Pachl won her third national title and silver at the North American Championships. She finished fourth at the 1957 World Championships in Colorado Springs, Colorado.

== Results ==
International
Event	1951	1952	1953	1954	1955	1956	1957
Winter Olympics						6th	
World Championships				8th	6th		4th
North American Champ.			6th		4th		2nd
National
Canadian Champ.			3rd		1st	1st	1st
Canadian Champ.	3rd J	3rd J	3rd J				
J: Junior level
