= Eva von Gamm =

German pair skater (1933–2017)

Personal information
- Other names: Eva Neeb
- Born: c. 1933 Munich, Germany
- Died: 3 April 2017 (aged 84) Munich, Germany

Figure skating career
- Country: West Germany
- Partner: Karl Probst
- Skating club: Münchner EV
- Retired: c. 1956

Eva von Gamm, née Neeb, (c. 1933 – 3 April 2017) was a German pair skater and figure skating judge. With her skating partner, Karl Probst, she became a three-time West German national medalist and competed at five ISU Championships in the 1950s.

== Personal life ==
Eva von Gamm was born in Munich in the 1930s and had two children. She died in Munich on 3 April 2017.

== Career ==
Neeb and Probst trained together in Munich. They competed internationally for West Germany and finished on the national podium three times, winning silver in 1953 and 1956 and bronze in 1955. They competed at the 1953 European Championships in Dortmund, West Germany; 1953 World Championships in Davos, Switzerland; 1954 European Championships in Bolzano, Italy; 1956 European Championships in Paris, France; and 1956 World Championships in Garmisch-Partenkirchen, West Germany.

Neeb and Probst also competed in roller skating.

After retiring from competition, von Gamm became a lawyer and skating judge. She judged ladies' singles at the 1976 Winter Olympics in Innsbruck, Austria. She served as a judge for singles and pairs at multiple World Championships, including 1968, 1971, 1974, 1978, 1979, 1980, 1984, and 1986.

== Competitive highlights ==
with Probst

International
Event	1953	1954	1955	1956
World Championships	9th			10th
European Championships	5th	8th		10th
National
West German Championships	2nd		3rd	2nd
