= Mary Kenner (figure skater) =

Canadian figure skater

Personal information
- Nationality: Canadian
- Born: 7 December 1933
- Died: 28 October 2017 (aged 83)

Sport
- Sport: Figure skating

Mary Kenner (7 Dec 1933 – 28 October 2017) was a Canadian figure skater. She competed in the 1953 World Figure Skating Championships.
