= Karl Probst (figure skater) =

German former pair skater

Figure skating career
- Country: West Germany
- Partner: Eva Neeb
- Skating club: Münchner EV
- Retired: c. 1956

Karl Probst was a German former pair skater. With his skating partner, Eva Neeb, he became a three-time West German national medalist and competed at five ISU Championships in the 1950s.

== Career ==
Neeb and Probst trained together in Munich. They competed internationally for West Germany and finished on the national podium three times, winning silver in 1953 and 1956 and bronze in 1955. They competed at the 1953 European Championships in Dortmund, West Germany; 1953 World Championships in Davos, Switzerland; 1954 European Championships in Bolzano, Italy; 1956 European Championships in Paris, France; and 1956 World Championships in Garmisch-Partenkirchen, West Germany. He died in June 2023

Neeb and Probst also competed in roller skating.

== Competitive highlights ==
with Neeb

International
Event	1953	1954	1955	1956
World Championships	9th			10th
European Championships	5th	8th		10th
National
West German Championships	2nd		3rd	2nd
