= Barbara Radford =

British figure skater

Figure skating career
- Country: Great Britain
Medal record
Representing Great Britain
Figure skating: Ice dancing
World Championships
Bronze medal – third place	1955 Vienna	Ice dancing
European Championships
Bronze medal – third place	1954 Bolzano	Ice dancing
Bronze medal – third place	1955 Budapest	Ice dancing

Barbara Radford is a British figure skater who competed in ice dance.

With partner Raymond Lockwood, she won the bronze medal at the 1955 World Figure Skating Championships.

== Competitive highlights ==
With Raymond Lockwood

Event	1954	1955
World Championships	4th	3rd
European Championships	3rd	3rd
