= Lawrence Demmy =

British ice dancer

Personal information
- Full name: Lawrence Demmy
- Born: Lawrence Dembovsky; 1931 Manchester, England
- Died: 9 December 2016 (aged 84–85) Kingston upon Hull, England

Figure skating career
- Country: United Kingdom
- Partner: Jean Westwood
Medal record
Figure skating
Ice dancing
Representing United Kingdom
Gold medal – first place	1955 Vienna	Ice dancing
Gold medal – first place	1954 Oslo	Ice dancing
Gold medal – first place	1953 Davos	Ice dancing
Gold medal – first place	1952 Paris	Ice dancing
European Championships
Gold medal – first place	1955 Budapest	Ice dancing
Gold medal – first place	1954 Bolzano	Ice dancing

Lawrence Demmy (1931 – 9 December 2016) was an English ice dancer. With partner Jean Westwood, he was the World Champion for four consecutive years, 1952 to 1955 (plus the unofficial trial event in 1951), and European Champion in its first two editions in 1954 and 1955.

They were inducted into the World Figure Skating Hall of Fame in 1977.

== Results ==
(with Jean Westwood)

Event	1951	1952	1953	1954	1955
World Championships	1st*	1st	1st	1st	1st
European Championships				1st	1st
British Championships	2nd	2nd	1st	1st	1st
