= David Jenkins (figure skater) =

American figure skater (born 1936)

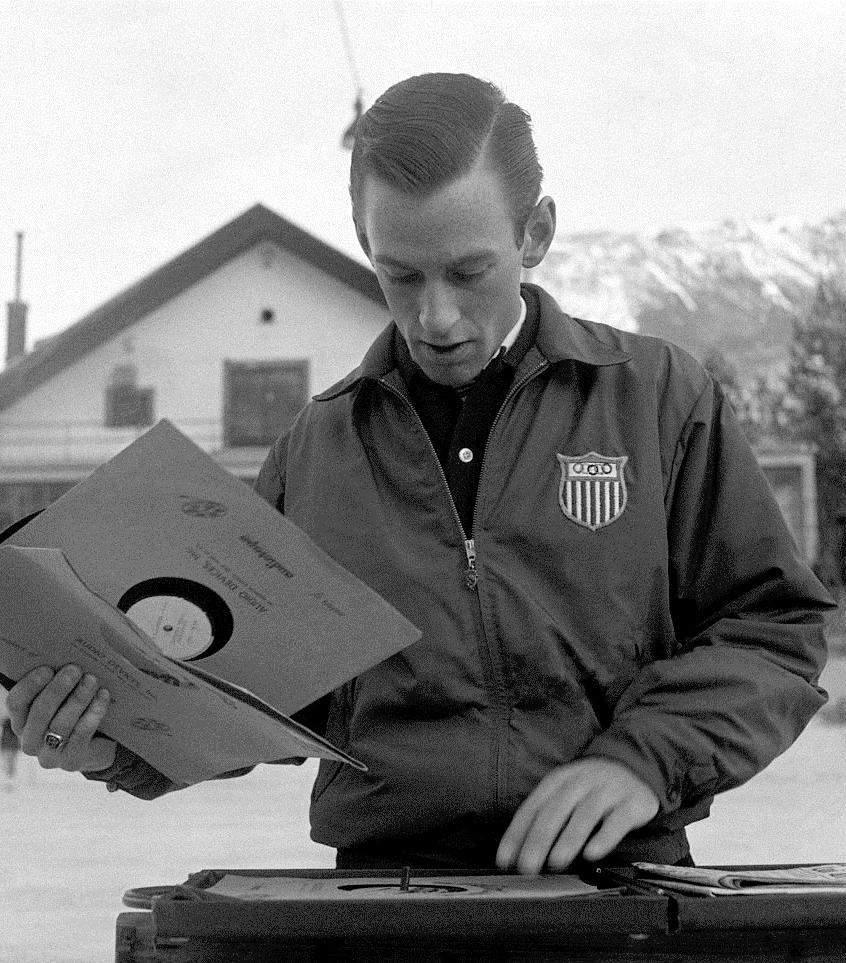
- Jenkins at the 1956 Olympics

Personal information
- Full name: David Wilkinson Jenkins
- Born: June 29, 1936 (age 90) Akron, Ohio, U.S.

Figure skating career
- Country: United States
- Discipline: Men's singles
- Skating club: Broadmoor SC
- Retired: 1960
Medal record
Olympic Games
Gold medal – first place	1960 Squaw Valley	Singles
Bronze medal – third place	1956 Cortina d'Ampezzo	Singles
World Championships
Gold medal – first place	1959 Colorado Springs	Singles
Gold medal – first place	1958 Paris	Singles
Gold medal – first place	1957 Colorado Springs	Singles
Bronze medal – third place	1956 Garmisch-Partenkirchen	Singles
Bronze medal – third place	1955 Vienna	Singles
North American Championships
Gold medal – first place	1957 Rochester	Singles
Silver medal – second place	1955 Regina	Singles

David Wilkinson Jenkins (born June 29, 1936) is an American former figure skater. He is the 1960 Olympic champion, the 1956 Olympic bronze medalist, a three-time World champion, and a four-time U.S. national champion.

== Personal life ==
Jenkins was born on June 29, 1936, in Akron, Ohio. He is the younger brother of Hayes Alan Jenkins, also an American former figure skater.

He studied at Case Western Reserve University School of Medicine during his competitive career. He took a leave of absence during his time with Ice Follies. After graduating in 1963, he became a practicing physician.

Jenkins graduated with an M.D. in 1963 and immediately after served two years in the U.S. Air Force. In June 1965 he married Barbara Ruth Boling and settled in Tulsa, where he became a gastroenterologist. Neither his wife nor his three children skate.

== Skating career ==
Jenkins won his first senior national medal, silver, at the 1954 U.S. Championships. His first world medal, bronze, came at the 1955 World Championships. He received the bronze medal at the 1956 Winter Olympics while his brother won the gold.

The brothers received financial support from the Broadmoor Hotel in Colorado Springs, Colorado, and a foundation.

In 1957, David Jenkins became the U.S. national champion and won the first of his three consecutive world titles. He performed a triple Axel jump in a 1957 exhibition, 21 years before that jump was landed for the first time in competition.

After taking his fourth consecutive national title, he won the gold medal at the 1960 Winter Olympics. Edi Scholdan served as his coach.

Following the 1960 Olympics, Jenkins declined to compete at the 1960 World Figure Skating Championships and turned professional, joining the Ice Follies.

== Competitive highlights ==
International
Event	1951	1952	1953	1954	1955	1956	1957	1958	1959	1960
Winter Olympics						3rd				1st
World Championships				4th	3rd	3rd	1st	1st	1st	
North American Champ.					2nd		1st			
National
U.S. Championships	3rd J	3rd J	1st J	2nd	2nd	3rd	1st	1st	1st	1st
