= 1956 Winter Olympics =

Multi-sport event in Cortina d'Ampezzo, Italy

VII Olympic Winter Games
- Emblem of the 1956 Winter Olympics (Note: The emblem is a stylized snowflake enclosing the image of the Dolomites with the Olympic rings and a star – the emblem of the Italian National Olympic Committee.)
- Location: Cortina d'Ampezzo, Italy
- Nations: 32
- Athletes: 825 (691 men, 134 women)
- Events: 24 in 4 sports (8 disciplines)
- Opening: 26 January 1956
- Closing: 5 February 1956
- Opened by: President Giovanni Gronchi
- Cauldron: Guido Caroli
- Stadium: Stadio olimpico del ghiaccio

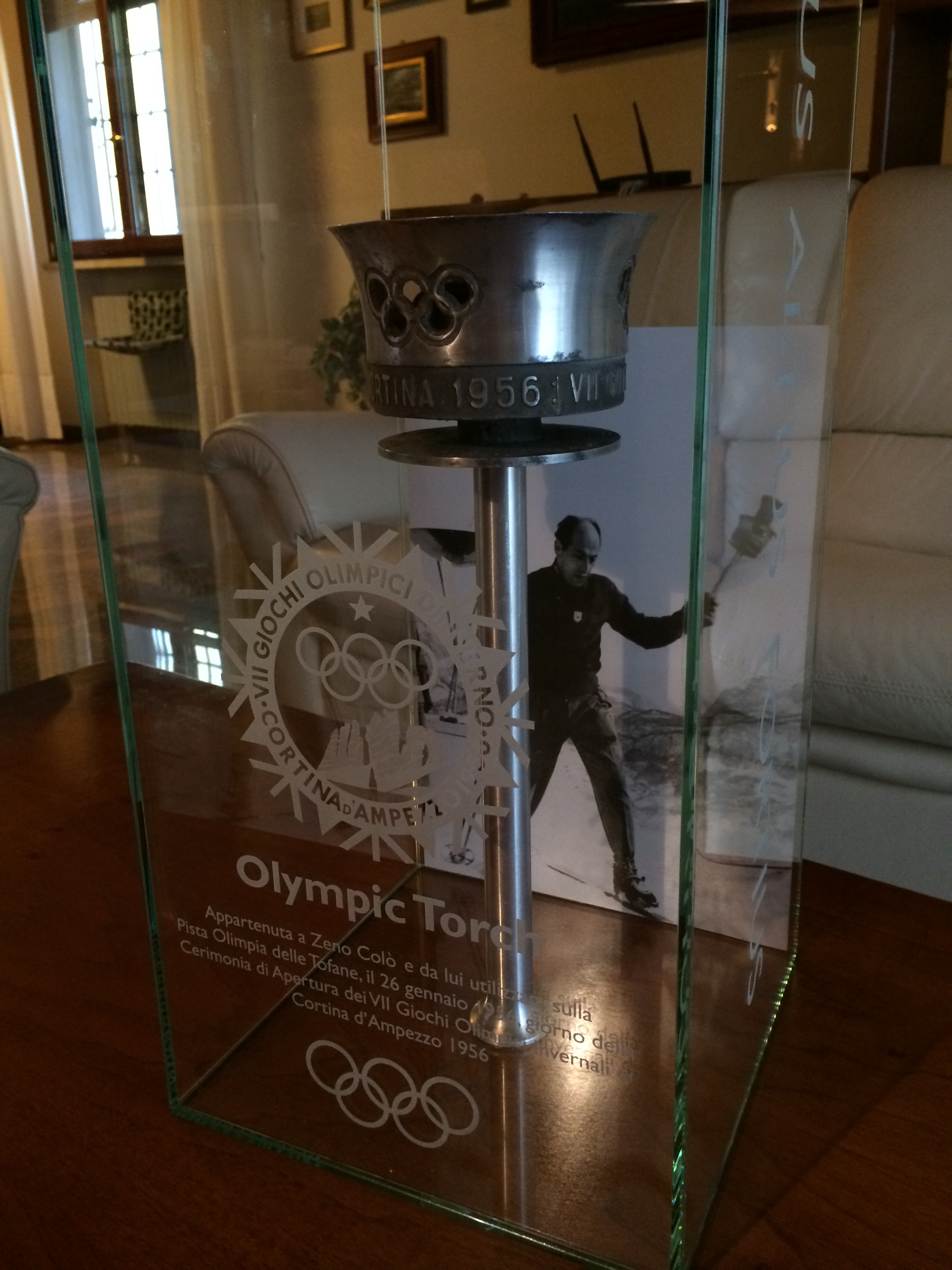
The Olympic torch of Cortina 1956 Winter Games used by Olympic Champion Zeno Colò (Italy) Private collection Fabio Ferrari

The 1956 Winter Olympics, officially known as the VII Olympic Winter Games (Italian: VII Giochi olimpici invernali or VII Giochi olimpici d'inverno) and commonly known as Cortina d'Ampezzo 1956 (Ampezzan Ladin: Anpezo 1956), were a multi-sport event held in Cortina d'Ampezzo, Italy, from 26 January to 5 February 1956.

Cortina, which had originally been awarded the 1944 Winter Olympics, beat out Montreal, Colorado Springs and Lake Placid for the right to host the 1956 Games. The Cortina Games were unique in that many of the venues were within walking distance of each other. The organising committee received financial support from the Italian government for infrastructure improvements, but the rest of the costs for the Games had to be privately financed. Consequently, the organising committee was the first to rely heavily on corporate sponsorship for funding.

Thirty-two nations—the largest number of countries participating in the Winter Olympics until then—competed in the four sports and twenty-four events. Austrian Toni Sailer became the first person to sweep all three alpine skiing events in a single Olympics. The figure skating competition was held outdoors for the last time at these Games. Logistically, the only problem encountered was a lack of snow at the alpine skiing events. To remedy this, the Italian army transported large amounts of snow to ensure the courses were adequately covered.

Politics did not affect the 1956 Winter Games – unlike the Summer Games in Melbourne, Victoria, Australia later in the year which many nations boycotted after the Soviet repression of the Hungarian Revolution, and the Suez War. The Cortina Olympics were the first Winter Olympics televised to a multi-national audience. Cortina co-hosted the 2026 Winter Olympics with Milan, Lombardy, 70 years after the 1956 Games.

== Host city selection ==
Cortina d'Ampezzo is a ski resort village situated in the Dolomite Alps in the north-eastern corner of Italy. In 1956, it had a population of 6,500 people. Count Alberto Bonacossa, an accomplished alpine skier, figure skater and a member of the International Olympic Committee (IOC) since 1925, spearheaded the effort to bring the Olympic Games to Cortina d'Ampezzo. He persuaded the city council of Cortina to bid for the 1944 Games. During the 38th IOC Congress held in London in 1939, Cortina d'Ampezzo was awarded the 1944 Winter Olympics, but the Games were canceled due to the outbreak of World War II.

In 1946 the Italian Winter Sports Federation convened in Milan and decided to support a new attempt from Cortina to host the Winter Games. A delegation, led by Count Bonacossa, presented Cortina's bid to host the 1952 Winter Olympics at the 40th IOC Session in Stockholm, Sweden. They were backed by the city's council and the Italian National Olympic Committee (CONI, Comitato Olimpico Nazionale Italiano). A rival bid from Oslo, Norway, soundly defeated Cortina. Count Bonacossa's and CONI prepared a third bid, this time for the 1956 Winter Games. The host city selection took place in Rome, during the 43rd IOC Session. On 28 April 1949, Cortina d'Ampezzo was selected with 75% of the votes, over bids from Montreal, Colorado Springs and Lake Placid. Unfortunately, Bonacossa died on 30 January 1953, three years before he could witness Cortina host the Games.

1956 Winter Olympics bidding result
| City | Country | Round 1 |
| Cortina d'Ampezzo | Italy | 31 |
| Montreal | Canada | 7 |
| Colorado Springs | United States | 2 |
| Lake Placid | United States | 1 |

== Participating nations ==
A total of 32 nations sent athletes to Cortina d'Ampezzo. Along with the Soviet Union, Bolivia and Pahlavi Iran competed at the Winter Games for the first time, making Bolivia the first completely tropical nation to participate in a Winter Olympics. South Korea, Liechtenstein and Turkey returned after having missed the 1952 Winter Olympics, while Argentina, Denmark, New Zealand and Portugal did not compete at these Games, after having participated in the previous edition. Athletes from West Germany (FRG) and East Germany (GDR) competed together as the United Team of Germany, an arrangement that would continue for the following two Olympiads.

Below is the list of participating nations, with the number of competitors indicated in brackets:

Participating National Olympic Committees
- Australia (8)
- Austria (60)
- Belgium (4)
- Bolivia (1)
- Bulgaria (7)
- Canada (37)
- Chile (4)
- Czechoslovakia (41)
- Finland (31)
- France (32)
- Great Britain (41)
- Greece (3)
- Hungary (2)
- Iceland (7)
- Iran (4)
- Italy (65) (host)
- Japan (10)
- Lebanon (3)
- Liechtenstein (8)
- Netherlands (8)
- Norway (45)
- Poland (51)
- Romania (19)
- South Korea (4)
- Soviet Union (53)
- Spain (9)
- Sweden (58)
- Switzerland (59)
- Turkey (4)
- United States (67)
- United Team of Germany (63)
- Yugoslavia (17)

=== Number of athletes by National Olympic Committees ===
| IOC Letter Code | Country | Athletes |
|---|---|---|
| USA | United States | 67 |
| ITA | Italy | 65 |
| EUA | United Team of Germany | 63 |
| AUT | Austria | 60 |
| SVI | Switzerland | 59 |
| SVE | Sweden | 58 |
| URS | Soviet Union | 53 |
| POL | Poland | 51 |
| NOR | Norway | 45 |
| CSL | Czechoslovakia | 41 |
| GRB | Great Britain | 41 |
| CAN | Canada | 37 |
| FRA | France | 32 |
| FIN | Finland | 31 |
| ROM | Romania | 19 |
| JUG | Yugoslavia | 17 |
| GIA | Japan | 10 |
| SPA | Spain | 9 |
| AUS | Australia | 8 |
| ISL | Iceland | 8 |
| LIC | Liechtenstein | 8 |
| OLA | Netherlands | 8 |
| BUL | Bulgaria | 7 |
| TUR | Turkey | 6 |
| BEL | Belgium | 4 |
| CIL | Chile | 4 |
| IRN | Iran | 4 |
| COR | South Korea | 4 |
| GRE | Greece | 3 |
| LIB | Lebanon | 3 |
| UNG | Hungary | 2 |
| BOL | Bolivia | 1 |
| Total | | 821 |

== Medal count ==
These are the top ten nations that won medals at the 1956 Winter Olympics:

* Host nation (Italy)

| Rank | Nation | Gold | Silver | Bronze | Total |
|---|---|---|---|---|---|
| 1 | Soviet Union^{[a]} | 7 | 3 | 6 | 16 |
| 2 | Austria | 4 | 3 | 4 | 11 |
| 3 | Finland | 3 | 3 | 1 | 7 |
| 4 | Switzerland | 3 | 2 | 1 | 6 |
| 5 | Sweden | 2 | 4 | 4 | 10 |
| 6 | United States | 2 | 3 | 2 | 7 |
| 7 | Norway | 2 | 1 | 1 | 4 |
| 8 | Italy* | 1 | 2 | 0 | 3 |
| 9 | United Team of Germany | 1 | 0 | 1 | 2 |
| 10 | Canada | 0 | 1 | 2 | 3 |
| Totals (10 entries) | | 25 | 22 | 22 | 69 |

- ^[a] Two gold medals were awarded when Soviet skaters tied for first in the 1,500 metre speed skating competition.

=== Podium sweeps ===
| Date | Sport | Event | NOC | Gold | Silver | Bronze |
|---|---|---|---|---|---|---|
| 29 January | Alpine skiing | Men's giant slalom | Austria | Toni Sailer | Andreas Molterer | Walter Schuster |
| 1 February | Figure skating | Men's singles | United States | Hayes Alan Jenkins | Ronald Robertson | David Jenkins |

== Organization ==
Location in Europe
Location in the Alps in northeast Italy

The 1956 Winter Olympics was organised by a committee composed of members of the Italian National Olympic Committee and the Italian government. Observers were sent to the Oslo Games in 1952 to collect information regarding the sports programme, infrastructure, and accommodation requirements. The intelligence gathered there indicated that Cortina's facilities were not up to Olympic standards. The town did not have an ice stadium, or a speed skating rink; the alpine ski runs, ski jump and bobsleigh run were in poor condition. Cortina was a small village, and its infrastructure would be overwhelmed by the crowds expected for the Games. To accommodate the influx of people, new roads and rail lines had to be built, and the city's power grid and telephone lines expanded. Enhancements also had to be made to sewer and water capacity. The Italian government supplied Italian lira 460 million for infrastructure improvements. The Italian Olympic Committee was responsible for funding the rest of the costs of hosting the Games. They did this by setting aside monies from their own budget, ticket sales, and even culling funds from local football betting pools. The organising committee also took the unprecedented step of selling corporate sponsorship. For example, Fiat was designated the official car of the 1956 Winter Olympics, and Olivetti supplied typewriters for the 400 journalists attending the Games.

== Politics ==
The Cold War began after the allied victory in World War II. Until 1952, many of the Communist countries of Eastern Europe had participated in Worker's Olympics or Spartakiads. The Soviet Union emerged from international isolation by eschewing the Spartakiad and participating in the 1952 Summer Olympics in Helsinki; they made their Winter Olympics debut at the Cortina Games. Soviet general secretary Nikita Khrushchev's aim was to use international sports competitions, such as the Olympics, to demonstrate the superiority of communism, strengthen political ties with other communist countries, and project the Soviet Union as a peace-loving nation actively engaged in the world. The Soviets' participation at the Olympics raised the level of competition as they won the most medals and more gold medals than any other nation. Soviet Olympic team was also notorious for skirting the edge of amateur rules. All Soviet athletes held some nominal jobs, but were in fact state-sponsored and trained full-time. According to many experts, that gave the Soviet Union a huge advantage over the United States and other Western countries, whose athletes were students or real amateurs. The Cortina Games were held before the Hungarian Revolution and subsequent Soviet invasion, and the Suez War, which occurred in the autumn of 1956; the Winter Games escaped the boycotts that plagued the Melbourne Olympics, which were celebrated in November and December of that year.

=== Television ===
The Cortina Games were the first Winter Olympics to be broadcast to a multi-national audience. Television as a mass communication technology was expanding rapidly in the 1950s. In the midst of the Cold War, Europe was a propaganda battlefield as countries relayed television signals across the Iron Curtain. By 1956, countries in the Soviet sphere of influence had achieved a technological advantage and were able to broadcast communist television programmes into Finland, the eastern border regions and more isolated geographic areas of West Germany and Austria, where residents had coverage from an East German broadcast with a pro-communist point-of-view. Most West Germans watched the 1956 Winter Olympics via Eurovision broadcasts which were relayed all over western Europe including all major West German stations (Eurovision connectivity in 1956) The political ramifications were not the only impact television had on these Olympics. The Cortina Games did not generate revenue from television – the 1960 Winter Olympics in Squaw Valley were the first to do so – but were an experiment in the feasibility of televising a large multi-sport event. For the first time at an Olympic Games, the venues were built with television in mind. For example, the grand stand at the cross-country ski venue (Lo Stadio della neve) was built facing south so that the television cameras would not be adversely affected by the rising or setting sun.

== Events ==
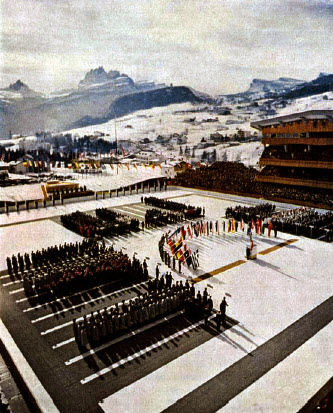
Opening ceremonies in 1956

Medals were awarded in 24 events contested in 4 sports (8 disciplines). The programme for the 1956 Winter Games saw two new events added to the four sports and twenty-two events from the 1952 Olympics, namely the men's 30 kilometre cross-country ski race and the women's 3x5 kilometre cross-country relay race.

- Bobsleigh (2) ()
- Ice hockey (1) ()
- Skating
  - Figure skating (3) ()
  - Speed skating (4) ()
- Skiing
  - Alpine skiing (6) ()
  - Nordic skiing ()
    - Cross-country skiing (6) ()
    - Nordic combined (1) ()
    - Ski jumping (1) ()

=== Opening ceremonies ===
The opening ceremonies took place on Thursday, 26 January 1956 in the Olympic Ice Stadium. Temporary seating was added to boost the stadium's capacity to 14,000 people. Athletes representing 32 nations marched in the ceremony and Mr Giovanni Gronchi, President of the Italian Republic, declared the Games open. At this point, speed skater Guido Caroli skated into the stadium with the Olympic flame. While he was entered on a circuit of the Ice Stadium he tripped and fell over a television cable; he regained his feet and lit the cauldron. The Olympic oath was delivered by Giuliana Chenal-Minuzzo; this was the first time a female athlete gave the oath at an Olympic Games. Michał Spisak's Olympic Hymn, officially recognised as such at the IOC congress in Paris on 13 June 1955 (declined in 1958 in favor of the Olympic Hymn by Spyridon Samaras), was played for the first time at the Cortina Games.

=== Bobsleigh ===
There were two bobsleigh events, the two-man and four-man competitions. Every participating nation was limited to two sleighs in each event. The sleighs made four runs, with the total time summed. The Italians won gold and silver in the two-man event. Switzerland took third place when they passed Spain on the fourth run. In the four-man event held a week later, the Swiss won the gold medal, Italy picked up the silver, and the United States won the bronze. Italy had participated in all six previous Olympic bobsleigh competitions but had never reached the podium. Italians Renzo Alverà and Eugenio Monti won the silver in the two-man competition and were also on the silver-winning four-man sleigh. Monti's silver medals at the 1956 Games were the first of six Olympic medals he would win in his bobsleigh career. The bobsleigh run at Cortina was eventually renamed the Eugenio Monti track to honour his bobsleigh career. The medals won in bobsleigh would be the host nation's only medals at these Games. One complaint of the bobsleigh events was that the track surface suffered extensive damage due to overuse. This hampered the performance of teams drawn late in the competition.

=== Ice hockey ===
The eighth Olympic ice hockey tournament also served as both the European and World Championships. Split into three pools before the tournament, the ten participating nations began by playing each team in their pool in a round robin format. The top two teams from each pool advanced to the final round, with the remaining teams played in a consolation group for 7th through 10th places. Canada, Czechoslovakia, and the Soviet Union took first place in their preliminary pools with undefeated records. Germany, the United States, and Sweden took second place in their pools.

An important early matchup of the final round was the game between Canada and the United States. The Canadians had never lost to the US in Olympic play prior to that game. In what was considered a tremendous upset, the United States defeated Canada 4–1. The Americans, who placed fourth at the 1955 Ice Hockey World Championships and were not expected to medal, then faced the USSR, who won the tournament in 1954 and took silver in 1955 behind Canada, in a game that would eventually make the difference in the gold medal. The Soviet team was leading only 1–0 late into the third period but then scored three in quick succession, overwhelming the underdogs and winning the match 4–0. The USSR then played Canada, who still had a chance to win the gold if they defeated the Soviets, and won 2–0 despite being dramatically outshot in the first and second periods. The USSR won gold, the United States surprisingly took silver and Canada, with their two losses, earned bronze, their worst result to date in Olympic play.

=== Figure skating ===
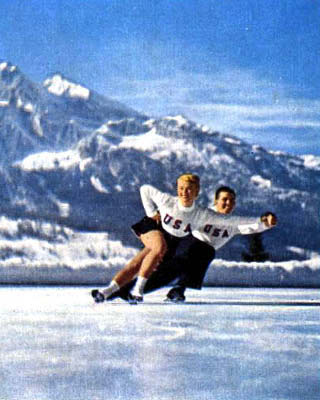
U.S. pair Ash and Kothmann at the 1956 Winter Olympics

The Cortina Games were the last Olympics to feature figure skating outdoors. Skaters from the United States won five medals, sweeping the men's event and taking the top two spots in the ladies' event. Tenley Albright was the women's Olympic champion despite sustaining a serious injury in practice. Less than two weeks before the Olympics she was practicing her skating routine when she hit a rut in the ice and fell. Her skate cut through several layers of clothing, and sliced her right leg at the ankle. Her teammate Carol Heiss won the silver, and Austrian Ingrid Wendl earned the bronze medal. Americans Hayes Jenkins, Ronald Robertson, and Jenkins' brother David Jenkins were the men's medallists. The Austrian pair of Sissy Schwarz and Kurt Oppelt took the gold medal in the pairs event. Canadians Frances Dafoe and Norris Bowden won the silver and the Hungarian siblings Marianna Nagy and László Nagy defended their bronze medal from the 1952 Games.

=== Speed skating ===
The Soviet Union dominated the speed skating events by winning seven of the twelve medals, including four golds. Soviet skaters set two world records, an Olympic record, and had at least one medallist in each of the four events. Yevgeny Grishin was the top individual performer, with two gold medals and two world records. Grishin and Soviet teammate Yuri Mikhaylov tied in the 1,500 metre race. It was decided to award both of the athletes gold medals and leave the silver medal position vacant. Sigvard Ericsson of Sweden earned gold and silver medals and set an Olympic record in the 10,000 metre event.

=== Alpine skiing ===
Six alpine skiing events were held, three for men and three for women. The races were the downhill, slalom and giant slalom. Toni Sailer of Austria swept the men's gold medals, becoming the first person to win three alpine skiing golds in a single Olympics. Led by Sailer, the Austrians dominated the alpine skiing events for both men and women, winning nine out of a possible eighteen medals. The Austrians were particularly successful in the giant slalom; the men swept the medals and the women took silver and bronze. Chiharu Igaya won the first Winter Olympics medal for Japan when he placed second in the slalom. Swiss teammates, Madeleine Berthod and Renée Colliard won the women's downhill and slalom races. Germany earned its only gold medal of the Games when Ossi Reichert took first in the giant slalom.

=== Cross-country skiing ===
Two women's events were added to the cross-country skiing programme for the first time. The Soviet women took the top two spots in the individual 10 kilometre race but lost to Finland in the new 3x5 kilometre relay. The men had a new event as well, the 30 kilometre race, which was won by Veikko Hakulinen from Finland. The other three men's events were won by three different nations: Norway took the 15 kilometre race, Sweden the 50 kilometre event, and the Soviet Union won the relay. Overall the Soviet Union won seven out of a possible eighteen medals in cross-country skiing. Sweden, behind the strong skiing of Sixten Jernberg, won six medals. Jernberg won a gold, two silvers, and a bronze, which were the first of nine Olympic medals he would earn in his cross-country career.

=== Nordic combined ===
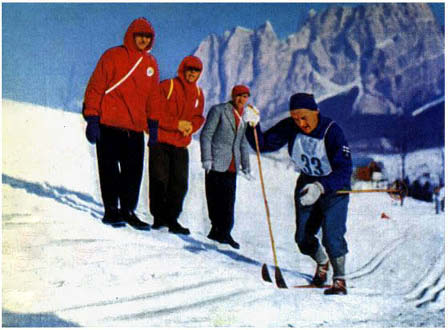
Sverre Stenersen on his way to victory in the Nordic combined

There were significant changes to the Nordic combined event at the 1956 Games. The event had always been a cross-country race followed by a ski jump. Originally the competitors in the Nordic combined were entered into the open 18 kilometre cross-country race, which meant that they competed alongside athletes who were dedicated cross-country skiers. Their times were combined with their score from two ski jumps to determine the winner. At the Cortina Games, the format was altered to allow the Nordic combined athletes to compete in a dedicated 15 kilometre cross-country race. Two days later they had three jumps on the ski jump hill. Their best two scores were combined with their cross-country time to determine a winner. This format would become the standard for Nordic combined competitions going forward. Norway continued its dominance of Nordic combined when Sverre Stenersen won the gold medal. Since its inception at the 1924 Games, the country had only lost the Nordic combined event once. Stenersen was followed by Bengt Eriksson of Sweden and Poland's Franciszek Gąsienica Groń.

=== Ski jumping ===
In the ski jumping event, the Swiss jumper, Andreas Däscher introduced a new style of jumping, which would soon come to be known as the Däscher technique. Before these Games, the athletes would hold their arms forward over their heads. Däscher reasoned that if the athlete held his arms at his side he would fly farther. Adherents to this new style dominated the competition. Finnish jumpers Antti Hyvärinen and Aulis Källakorpi took first and second place; Harry Glass of Germany won the bronze medal. This competition marked the end of Norwegian dominance in the sport. Since the first winter Games in 1924, the Norwegians had won the gold medal at each Olympics until 1956. The poor performance of the Norwegian jumpers was attributed to their refusal to use the new jumping technique.

=== Closing ceremonies ===
The closing ceremonies took place on Sunday, 5 February in the Olympic Ice Stadium. They were preceded by a figure skating exhibition performed by the men's, women's, and pairs figure skating champions. The flag bearers of each nation then entered the stadium followed by the flags of Greece, Italy, and the United States. These three flags were raised to honor the nation that founded the Olympics, the host nation, and the next country to host the Winter Games. Avery Brundage, President of the International Olympic Committee, declared the Olympics closed, and a fireworks display concluded the Games.

== Calendar ==
All dates are in Central European Time (UTC+1)

The opening ceremony was held on 26 January, along with the first games of the hockey tournament. From 27 January until 5 February, the day of the closing ceremony, at least one event final was held each day.

| OC | Opening ceremony | ● | Event competitions | 1 | Event finals† | CC | Closing ceremony |

| January 1956 February 1956 | 26 Thu | 27 Fri | 28 Sat | 29 Sun | 30 Mon | 31 Tue | 1 Wed | 2 Thu | 3 Fri | 4 Sat | 5 Sun | Events |
|---|---|---|---|---|---|---|---|---|---|---|---|---|
| Ceremonies | OC | | | | | | | | | | CC | |
| Bobsleigh | | ● | 1 | | | | | | ● | 1 | | 2 |
| Ice hockey | ● | ● | ● | ● | ● | ● | ● | ● | ● | 1 | | 1 |
| Figure skating | | | | ● | ● | ● | 1 | 1 | 1 | | | 3 |
| Speed skating | | | 1 | 1 | 1 | 1 | | | | | | 4 |
| Alpine skiing | | 1 | | 1 | 1 | 1 | 1 | | 1 | | | 6 |
| Cross-country skiing | | 1 | 1 | | 1 | | 1 | 1 | | 1 | | 6 |
| Nordic combined | | | | ● | | 1 | | | | | | 1 |
| Ski jumping | | | | | | | | | | | 1 | 1 |
| Total event finals | | 2 | 3 | 2 | 3 | 3 | 3 | 2 | 2 | 3 | 1 | 24 |
| Cumulative Total | | 2 | 5 | 7 | 10 | 13 | 16 | 18 | 20 | 23 | 24 | 24 |

† The numeral indicates the number of event finals for each sport held that day.

== Venues ==
A unique feature of the Cortina Olympics was the proximity of many event locations which were in walking distance of each other within the town of Cortina. The speed skating events were held at Lake Misurina, roughly 13 km (8.1 mi) from Cortina. The venues featured grandstands heated by silica coils built into the seats. Silica coil heating was a technology that had only recently become economical. The competitions were held without incident except for the skiing events, which suffered from a lack of snow.

A notable venue not found at the 1956 Games was an Olympic Village, where the athletes would be housed. The town of Cortina d'Ampezzo had a population of less than 7,000 people in 1956. Local hotels were concerned that after the Olympics an Olympic Village would so significantly increase the hotel capacity it would put many of them out of business. Athletes were billeted by local families or stayed in hotels during the Games.

The Olympic Ice Stadium (Stadio Olimpico Del Ghiaccio) was intended to be the focal point of the Games. It was built on the banks of the Boite river just north of Cortina. After new roads and a bridge had been constructed, the stadium was an eight-minute walk from the center of town. The stadium was built to accommodate 6,000–7,000 people. Due to space limitations the grandstands were constructed vertically, with tiers built directly on top of each other. There were two artificial ice rinks of 30 by 60 m (98 by 197 ft), with a total ice surface of 4,320 m^{2} (46,500 sq ft). A special cooling plant was built under the stadium, which froze the ice through the evaporation of ammonia. The construction cost totaled ITL 1.3 billion (US$2.1 million in 1956), making it the most expensive venue of these Games. The stadium was used for the opening and closing ceremonies, all of the figure skating competitions and main ice hockey games. After the Games, the organising committee made the Ice Stadium a gift to the city of Cortina and turned it on a permanent installation. It was used as an ice skating rink in the winter and an outdoor gymnasium for judo and gymnastics in the summer and hosted the curling events at the 2026 Winter Olympics and 2026 Winter Paralympics.

The Apollonio Stadium was used for select games of the ice hockey tournament. Considerable work had to be done to bring the stadium up to date. A second rink was added to allow for two games to be held simultaneously. The stadium was outfitted with electric lights and the seating capacity was enlarged to accommodate 2,000 people.

The bobsleigh run (Pista Olimpica di Bob – Eugenio Monti), was originally constructed in 1928. The track was rebuilt and expanded several times during the years leading up to the Olympics. A state-of-the-art signal board was installed displaying a diagram of the run with the position of each sleigh on the run shown with lights. Despite being closed in 2008, the track was replaced and hosted the bobsleigh, the skeleton, and the luge during the 2026 Winter Olympics.

Situated around 2.5 km (2 mi) from Cortina, near Zuel, the "Italia" Jump (Trampolino Olimpico Italia) was originally built in 1923 as the "Franchetti" Jump. After modifications in 1926, the first structure was demolished in 1939 and rebuilt in 1940. With the 1956 Games coming to Cortina, the jump had to be updated again to comply with the technical demands of the Olympics. On 15 April 1955, the "Franchetti" Jump was finally demolished and the new "Italia Jump" was completed in the same year at a cost of nearly ITL 310 million ($500,000). The reinforced concrete platform was 54 m (177 ft) high, and possessed an 87.5 m (287 ft) long, 35° steep in-run. Two grandstands, each with a capacity for 3,000 people, were placed on either side of the landing slope; a natural amphitheatre at the bottom of the hill could hold up to 40,000 standing spectators. A special road was built between Cortina and the venue for the transport of athletes, officials and authorities.

The Snow Stadium (Stadio della neve) was constructed 2 km (1.2 mi) from Cortina, and hosted all of the cross-country events. Two grandstands were constructed to accommodate 6,000 people. Three types of cross-country courses were constructed: one of 15 km (9 mi), three of 5 km (3 mi), and four of 10 km (6 mi). Some of these courses went through the bobsleigh run. As a result, a bridge had to be constructed so events occurring in the two venues would not interfere with each other.

The alpine runs (Le piste alpine) were built on the slopes of Monte Tofana and Monte Faloria in the nearby Dolomite alps. The men's and women's downhill and slalom races were held on Tofana. Faloria was the site of the two giant slalom events. It took nearly two years to complete construction of the runs. In previous years, lack of snow was never an issue, but in the winter of 1956 there was insufficient snowfall for skiers to safely navigate the runs. As a consequence, snow had to be transported from other parts of the mountains by the Italian army.

The Misurina rink (La pista di Misurina) was the location of the speed skating events. This was the last time that speed skating at the Olympics was held on natural ice. It was 13 km (8.1 mi) from Cortina. The rink was established at the northern end of the lake with a mountain backdrop. Stands were constructed to accommodate 8,500 people. Despite the event being held outdoors on lake ice, two world records and two Olympic records were broken during the competition.

Three of the venues for these games (the bobsleigh run, indoor arena, and ski jump) would serve as film location for the 1981 James Bond film For Your Eyes Only.

== See also ==
- 1956 Summer Olympics
- Olympic Games held in Italy
  - 1956 Winter Olympics – Cortina D'Ampezzo
  - 1960 Summer Olympics – Rome
  - 2006 Winter Olympics – Turin
  - 2026 Winter Olympics – Milan and Cortina D'Ampezzo
- List of IOC country codes

== Sources ==
- Comitato Olimpico Nazionale Italiano (1956). VII Olympic Winter Games: Official Report. Cortina d'Ampezzo. Archived from the original (PDF) on 25 December 2018.
- Findling, John E.; Pelle, Kimberly D. (1996). Historical Dictionary of the Modern Olympic Movement. Westport, US: Greenwood Publishing Group. p. 258. ISBN 0-313-28477-6. "1956 winter olympics."
- Guttman, Allen (1986). Sports Spectators. New York, NY: Columbia University Press. ISBN 0-231-06401-2.
- Judd, Ron C. (2008). The Winter Olympics. Seattle, US: The Mountaineers Books. ISBN 978-1-59485-063-9.
- Keys, Barbara (2006). 1956 European and Global Perspectives. Leipzig, Germany: Leipziger Universitätsverlag. ISBN 3-937209-56-5.
- Noverr, Douglas A.; Ziewacz, Lawrence E. (1983). The Games they Played. Chicago, US: Rowman & Littlefield. ISBN 0-88229-728-7.
- Riordan, James (1977). Sport in Soviet Society. Cambridge, England: University of Cambridge Press Syndicate. ISBN 9780521280235.
- Robertson, Alexander (1903). Through the Dolomities. London, England: George Allen. p. 172. "cortina d'ampezzo location."
- Schwoch, James (2009). Global TV New Media and the Cold War; 1946–69. Champaign, US: University of Illinois Press. ISBN 9780252033742.
- Toohey, Kristine; Veal, A.J. (2007). The Olympic Games: A Social Science Perspective. Cambridge, US: CAB International. ISBN 9781845933463.

Winter Olympics
| Preceded by Oslo | VII Olympic Winter Games; Cortina d'Ampezzo; 1956 | Succeeded by Squaw Valley |
