= Marianna Nagy (figure skater) =

Hungarian pair skater (1929–2011)

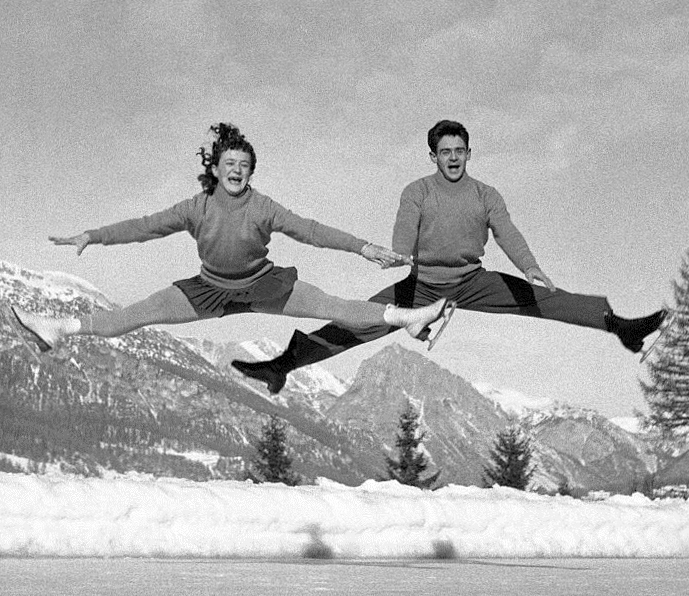
- Marianna and László Nagy at the 1956 Olympics

Personal information
- Born: 13 January 1929
- Died: 3 May 2011 (aged 82)
- Height: 1.58 m (5 ft 2 in)

Figure skating career
- Country: Hungary
- Skating club: Budapesti Korcsolyázó Egylet, Testnevelési Föiskola Sportegyesület, Czepeli Vasas
- Retired: 1958
Medal record
Representing Hungary
Pairs' figure skating
Olympic Games
Bronze medal – third place	1956 Cortina d'Ampezzo	Pairs
Bronze medal – third place	1952 Oslo	Pairs
World Championships
Bronze medal – third place	1955 Vienna	Pairs
Bronze medal – third place	1953 Davos	Pairs
Bronze medal – third place	1950 London	Pairs
European Championships
Silver medal – second place	1957 Vienna	Pairs
Silver medal – second place	1956 Paris	Pairs
Gold medal – first place	1955 Vienna	Pairs
Silver medal – second place	1953 Davos	Pairs
Bronze medal – third place	1952 Vienna	Pairs
Gold medal – first place	1950 Oslo	Pairs
Silver medal – second place	1949 Milan	Pairs

Marianna Nagy (13 January 1929 – 3 May 2011) was a Hungarian pair skater. Together with her brother László Nagy she won five bronze medals at the Olympic Games (1952 and 1956) and World championships (1950, 1953, 1955), as well as two European titles (1950 and 1955). After retiring from competitions she starred in ice shows and worked as a skating coach.

== Competitive highlights ==
(with László Nagy)

International
Event	1948	1949	1950	1951	1952	1953	1954	1955	1956	1957	1958
Winter Olympics	7th				3rd				3rd		
World Champ.	7th	4th	3rd			3rd		3rd			7th
European Champ.		2nd	1st		3rd	2nd		1st	2nd	2nd	4th
National
Hungarian Champ.			1st	1st	1st		1st	1st	1st	1st	1st
