= Tenley Albright =

American figure skater (born 1935)

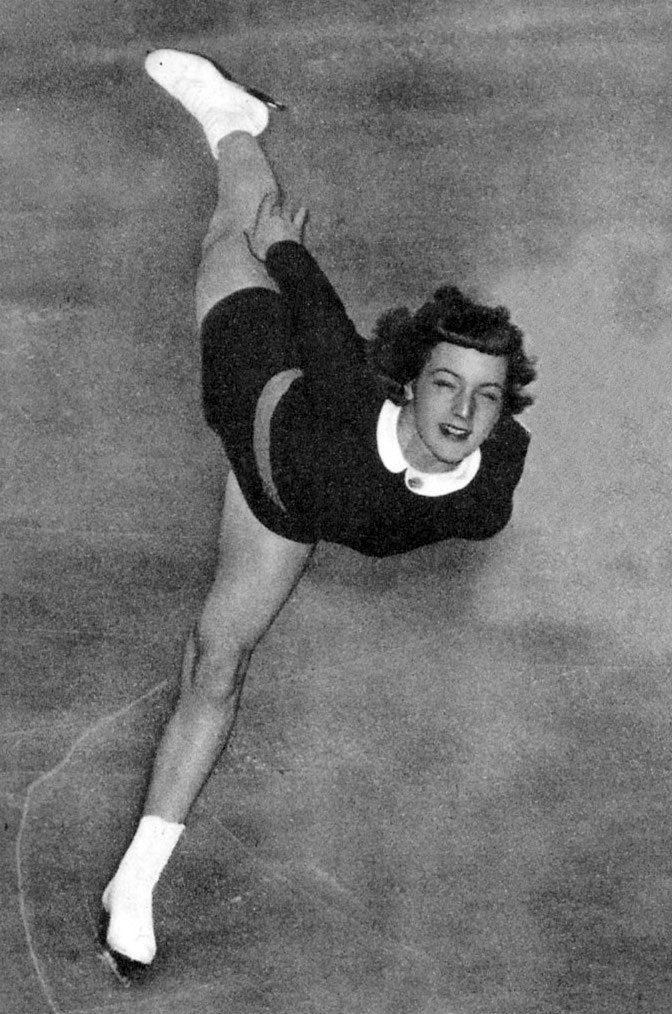
- Albright in 1953
- Born: Tenley Emma Albright; July 18, 1935 (age 91); Newton Centre, Massachusetts, U.S.
- Education: Harvard University (MD)
- Occupations: Figure skater; Surgeon; Philanthropist
- Spouses: Tudor Gardiner (m. 1962; div. 1981); Gerald Blakeley (m. 1981; died 2021)
- Children: 3
- Figure skating career
- Country: United States
- Skating club: Skating Club of Boston
- Retired: 1956
Medal record
Ladies' figure skating
Olympic Games
Gold medal – first place	1956 Cortina d'Ampezzo	Ladies' singles
Silver medal – second place	1952 Oslo	Ladies' singles
World Championships
Silver medal – second place	1956 Garmisch-Partenkirchen	Ladies' singles
Gold medal – first place	1955 Vienna	Ladies' singles
Silver medal – second place	1954 Oslo	Ladies' singles
Gold medal – first place	1953 Davos	Ladies' singles
North American Championships
Gold medal – first place	1955 Regina	Ladies' singles
Gold medal – first place	1953 Cleveland	Ladies' singles
Bronze medal – third place	1951 Calgary	Ladies' singles

Tenley Emma Albright (born July 18, 1935) is an American former figure skater and surgeon. She is the 1956 Olympic champion, the 1952 Olympic silver medalist, the 1953 and 1955 World Champion, the 1953 and 1955 North American champion, and the 1952–1956 U.S. national champion. Albright is also a graduate of Harvard Medical School. In 2015, she was inducted into the National Women's Hall of Fame.

== Early life ==
Albright was born in Newton, Massachusetts. Her father Hollis was a prominent surgeon and her mother Elin was an artist. She has a younger brother, Nile.

== Career ==
=== Figure skating ===
She began skating at age 8, on a homemade rink in the backyard of her family home.

In 1946, Albright contracted polio, which was deemed to be pre-paralytic. As figure skating historian James R. Hines put it: "Skating provided much needed physical therapy." Since her illness left her muscles “weak and withered”, she started training at the Skating Club of Boston as part of her rehabilitation. She found her rehabilitation "exhilarating". She would later say: "Did you ever notice how many athletes my age once had polio? I think it's because being paralyzed makes you aware of your muscles and you never want to let them go unused again."

Albright had two coaches in her career: Willie Frick and Maribel Vinson. She won the silver medal at the 1952 Olympics. She won her first World title in 1953, silver in 1954, a second gold medal in 1955, and her fourth medal, another silver, in 1956. She was the first American female skater to win a world title. In 1955, she recorded a triple: winning the US, North American, and World Championships that year. She managed to do this while enrolled as a full-time pre-med student at Radcliffe College.

Albright won the US Nationals Novice Championships at the age of 13 and the US Junior Championships at the age of 14, and then won five consecutive national titles starting at age 16. In 1956, while training for the Olympics, Albright fell due to a rut in the ice and cut her right ankle joint to the bone with her left skate. There are two different accounts of what happened next. In 1994, The New York Times reported that "Albright's father, a surgeon, stitched the wound" Then in 2026, Albright herself stated that "there was a woman who found a shoemaker in the village, and he was able to stitch it up for me."

At the 1956 Winter Olympics in Cortina d'Ampezzo, Italy, she became the first American female skater to win an Olympic gold medal.

Albright retired from competitive skating after 1956 but remained attached to figure skating as a sports functionary.

In 1982, Albright became a vice president of the U.S. Olympic Committee.

=== Medicine ===
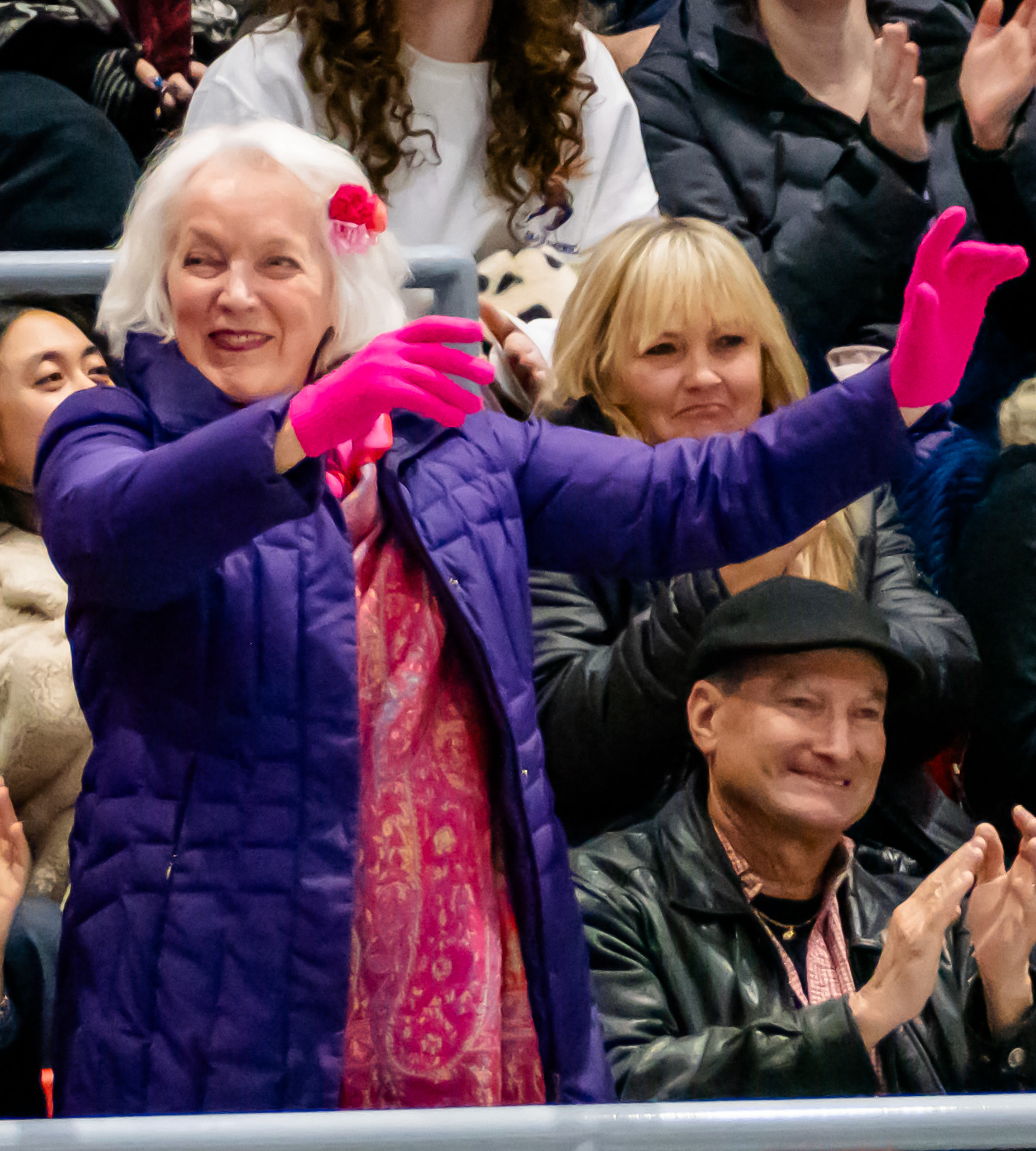
Albright as a guest at 2025 Skate America

A graduate of The Winsor School in Boston, Albright entered Radcliffe College in 1953 as a pre-med student, and focused on completing her education after the 1956 Olympics. She graduated from Harvard Medical School in 1961 at the age of 25, and went on to become a surgeon. She practiced for 23 years, continuing as a faculty member and lecturer at Harvard Medical School.

She chaired the Board of Regents of the National Library of Medicine at the National Institutes of Health. She has served as director for non-profits such as the Whitehead Institute for Biomedical Research and the Woods Hole Oceanographic Institution and companies such as West Pharmaceutical Services, Inc., and State Street Bank and Trust Company.

In 1976 she served as the chief physician for the US Winter Olympic team. The American Academy of Achievement presented her with a Golden Plate Award in 1976. Her accomplishments earned her an induction into the International Women's Sports Hall of Fame in 1983.

== Personal life ==
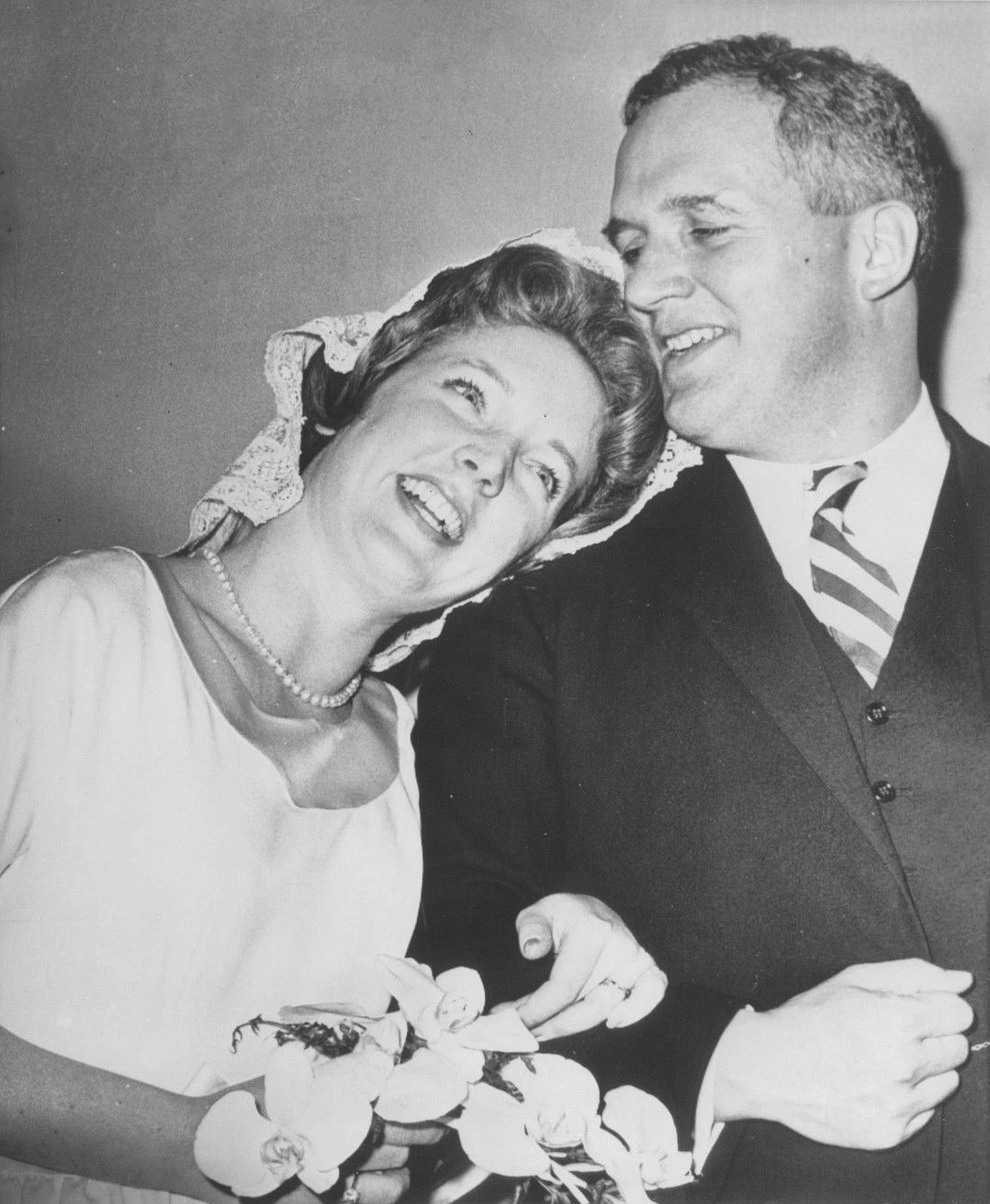
Tenley Albright and Tudor Gardiner getting married on December 31, 1961

Albright married Tudor Gardiner, a lawyer and son of William Tudor Gardiner, in 1962. Together they had three daughters. The couple divorced and in 1981, she married former Ritz-Carlton hotel owner Gerald Blakeley. He shared her association with Woods Hole and was chair of the Morehouse School of Medicine. Blakeley died on July 2, 2021 at age 100.

Albright serves on the Executive Advisory Board of the World.Minds Foundation, contributing her expertise in health policy, science, and leadership.

== Results ==
Results
International
Event	1950	1951	1952	1953	1954	1955	1956
Olympic Games			2nd				1st
World Championships		6th	WD	1st	2nd	1st	2nd
North American Championships		3rd		1st		1st	
National
U.S. Championships	1st J	2nd	1st	1st	1st	1st	1st
Eastern Sectionals	1st	1st	1st				
WD = Withdrew; J = Junior

== Works cited ==
- Hines, James R. (2011). Historical Dictionary of Figure Skating. Lanham, Maryland: Scarecrow Press. ISBN 978-0-8108-6859-5.
