= Nesta Davies =

Figure skating career
- Country: Great Britain
- Retired: 1954
Medal record
Representing Great Britain
Figure skating: Ice dancing
World Championships
Silver medal – second place	1954 Oslo	Ice dance
European Championships
Silver medal – second place	1954 Bolzano	Ice dance

Nesta Davies is a British retired figure skater who competed in ice dance.

With partner Paul Thomas, she won silver at the third-ever World Championships in ice dancing in 1954.

== Competitive highlights ==
With Paul Thomas

Соревнования/Сезоны	1953	1954
World Championships	4th	2nd
European Championships		2nd
