= Konrad Lienert =

Austrian pair skater

Personal information
- Born: 27 January 1933
- Died: 20 March 2014 (aged 81)

Figure skating career
- Country: Austria
- Partner: Liesl Ellend
- Skating club: WEV
- Retired: 1950s

Konrad Lienert (27 January 1933 – 20 March 2014) was an Austrian pair skater. Competing with Liesl Ellend, he became a two-time national champion (1957–1958). The pair finished fourth at the European Figure Skating Championships in 1955 and 1957, and ninth at the 1956 Winter Olympics.

== Results ==
=== With Ellend ===
International
Event	1955	1956	1957	1958
Winter Olympics				9th
World Championships	10th	8th		10th
European Championships	4th	6th	4th	9th
National
Austrian Championships	2nd	2nd	1st	1st

=== With Widstruk ===
National
Event	1953	1954
Austrian Championships	2nd	2nd
