= Hayes Alan Jenkins =

American figure skater (born 1933)

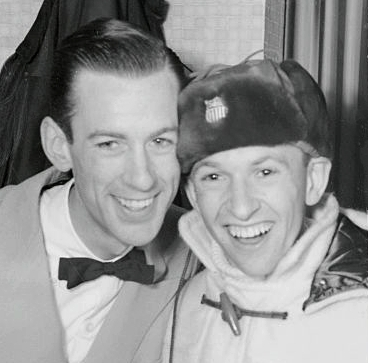
- Hayes (left) and David Jenkins in 1956

Personal information
- Born: March 23, 1933 (age 93) Akron, Ohio, U.S.
- Spouse: Carol Heiss (m. 1961)

Figure skating career
- Country: United States
- Discipline: Men's singles
- Skating club: Broadmoor SC; Cleveland Skating Club
- Retired: 1956
Medal record
Olympic Games
Gold medal – first place	1956 Cortina d'Ampezzo	Singles
World Championships
Gold medal – first place	1956 Garmisch-Partenkirchen	Singles
Gold medal – first place	1955 Vienna	Singles
Gold medal – first place	1954 Oslo	Singles
Gold medal – first place	1953 Davos	Singles
Bronze medal – third place	1952 Paris	Singles
Bronze medal – third place	1950 London	Singles
North American Championships
Gold medal – first place	1955 Regina	Singles
Gold medal – first place	1953 Cleveland	Singles

Hayes Alan Jenkins (born March 23, 1933) is an American former figure skater. He is the 1956 Olympic champion, a four-time World champion (1953–1956), and a four-time U.S. national champion (1953–1956).

== Personal life ==
Jenkins was born on March 23, 1933, in Akron, Ohio, the elder brother of David Jenkins, also an American former figure skater. He attended Colorado College and Harvard Law School. He went on to work for the Goodyear tire company as an international lawyer.

In 1961, Jenkins married U.S. figure skater Carol Heiss, who won silver at the 1956 Olympics and gold in 1960. The couple have three children together.

== Skating career ==
In 1949, Jenkins won his first senior national medal, bronze, and placed 6th in Paris, France, at his first World Championships. The following year, he became the national silver medalist and took bronze at the 1950 World Championships in London, England.

Jenkins placed 5th in the compulsory figures, third in the free skating, and 4th overall at the 1952 Winter Olympics in Oslo, Norway.

In 1953, Jenkins became the national champion for the first time. He went on to win the first of his four consecutive world titles.

Ranked first in the compulsory figures and second in free skating, he won the gold medal as the U.S. swept the men's podium at the 1956 Winter Olympics in Cortina d'Ampezzo, Italy. He retired from competitive skating after winning his fourth world title later in the same year.

The brothers received financial support from the Broadmoor Hotel in Colorado Springs, Colorado, and a foundation.

== Competitive highlights ==
International
Event	1948	1949	1950	1951	1952	1953	1954	1955	1956
Winter Olympics					4th				1st
World Championships		6th	3rd	4th	3rd	1st	1st	1st	1st
North American Champ.						1st		1st	
National
U.S. Championships	1st J	3rd	2nd	3rd	3rd	1st	1st	1st	1st
J = Junior
