= Hans Müller (figure skater) =

Swiss figure skater (1931–2021)

Personal information
- Full name: Hans Müller
- Born: 7 March 1931
- Died: 26 August 2021 (aged 90)

Figure skating career
- Country: Switzerland

Hans Müller (7 March 1931 – 26 August 2021) was a Swiss figure skater. He was the 1955 Swiss national champion. He represented Switzerland at the 1956 Winter Olympics and placed 12th in the men's event.

== Competitive highlights ==
Event	1954	1955	1956
Olympic Winter Games			12th
World Championships		12th	13th
European Championships	10th	8th	11th
Swiss Championships	2nd	1st	2nd
