= Annelies Schilhan =

Austrian figure skater (born 1936)

Personal information
- Born: 12 March 1936 (age 90)

Figure skating career
- Country: Austria
- Skating club: EK Engelmann
- Retired: 1950s

Annelies Schilhan (born 12 March 1936) is an Austrian former figure skater who competed in ladies' singles. She was a three-time Austrian national champion (1952–1954) and finished 16th at the 1952 Winter Olympics. She placed fourth at the 1954 European Championships. She belonged to EK Engelmann in Vienna.

== Results ==
International
Event	1951	1952	1953	1954
Winter Olympics		16th		
World Championships		14th	11th	
European Championships		10th	6th	4th
National
Austrian Championships	2nd	1st	1st	1st
