= Liesl Ellend =

Austrian pair skater

Personal information
- Full name: Elisabeth Ellend
- Born: 4 March 1940 (age 86)

Figure skating career
- Country: Austria
- Partner: Konrad Lienert
- Skating club: EK Engelmann
- Retired: 1950s

Elisabeth "Liesl" Ellend (born 4 March 1940) is an Austrian former pair skater. Competing with Konrad Lienert, she became a two-time national champion (1957–1958). The pair finished fourth at the European Figure Skating Championships in 1955 and 1957, and ninth at the 1956 Winter Olympics.

== Results ==
International
Event	1955	1956	1957	1958
Winter Olympics				9th
World Championships	10th	8th		10th
European Championships	4th	6th	4th	9th
National
Austrian Championships	2nd	2nd	1st	1st
