= Manuela Angeli =

Italian figure skater (born 1939)

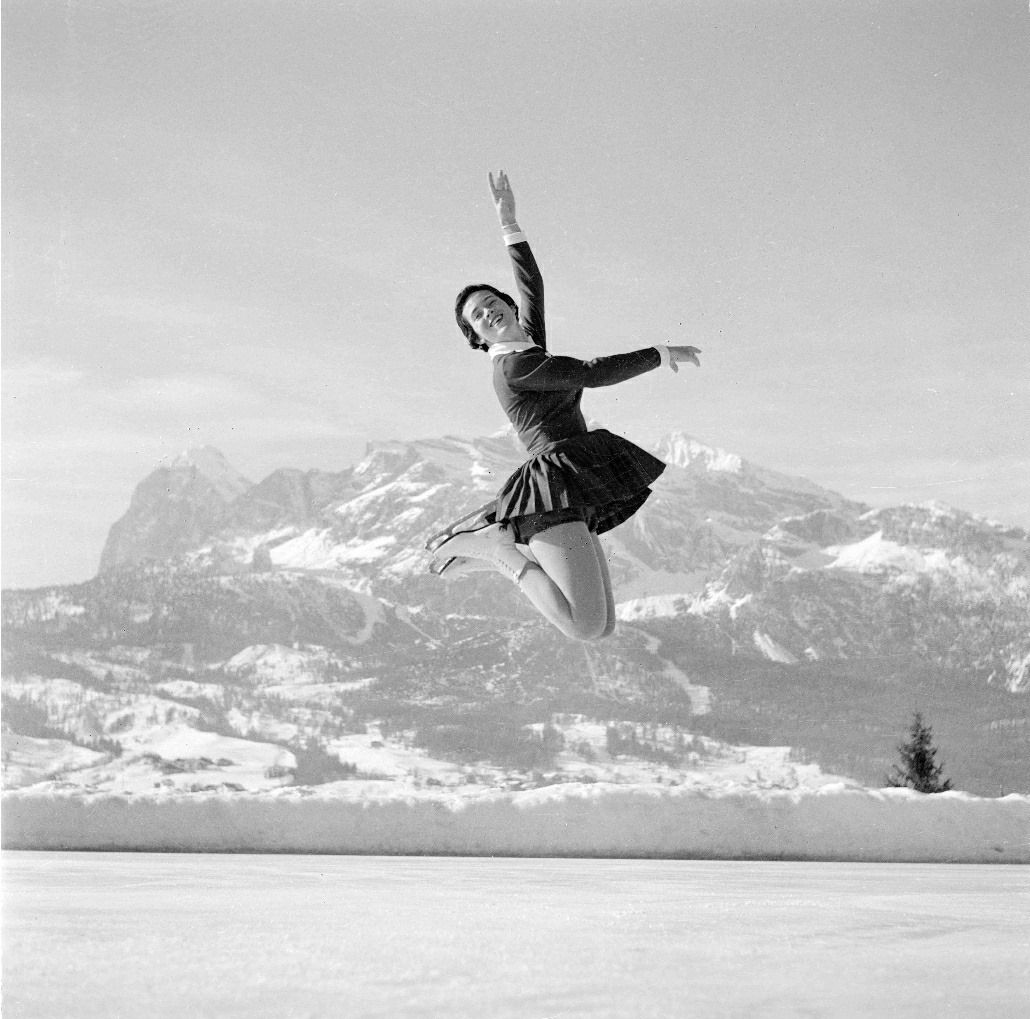

Personal information
- Born: 3 April 1939 (age 87) Cortina d'Ampezzo, Italy
- Height: 1.72 m (5 ft 7 1/2 in)

Figure skating career
- Country: Italy
- Retired: c. 1956

Manuela Angeli (born 3 April 1939) is an Italian former competitive figure skater. She represented Italy at the 1956 Winter Olympics in Cortina d'Ampezzo.

== Competitive highlights ==
International
Event	1953–54	1954–55	1955–56
Winter Olympics			21st
European Championships	22nd	16th	
National
Italian Championships	3rd		2nd
