= Raymond Lockwood =

British figure skater

Figure skating career
- Country: Great Britain
Medal record
Representing Great Britain
Figure skating: Ice dancing
World Championships
Bronze medal – third place	1955 Vienna	Ice dancing
European Championships
Bronze medal – third place	1954 Bolzano	Ice dancing
Bronze medal – third place	1955 Budapest	Ice dancing

Raymond Lockwood (12 December 1928 – 31 December 2009) was a British figure skater who competed in ice dance. He competed in the pairs event at the 1952 Winter Olympics.

With partner Barbara Radford, he won the bronze medal at the 1955 World Figure Skating Championships.

== Competitive highlights ==
With Barbara Radford

Event	1954	1955
World Championships	4th	3rd
European Championships	3rd	3rd
