= Ann Johnston (figure skater) =

Canadian figure skater (1936–2022)

Personal information
- Full name: Ann Johnston
- Born: April 18, 1936 Toronto, Ontario, Canada
- Died: May 26, 2022 (aged 86)

Figure skating career
- Country: Canada
- Skating club: Granite Club

Ann Johnston (April 18, 1936 – May 26, 2022) was a Canadian figure skater. She was the 1955 and 1956 Canadian silver medalist. She represented Canada at the 1956 Winter Olympics, where she placed ninth.

== Results ==
Event	1952	1953	1954	1955	1956
Winter Olympics					9th
World Championships			9th	9th	9th
Canadian Championships	2nd J.	2nd J.	5th	2nd	2nd

- J = Junior level
