= Sully Kothmann =

American pair skater

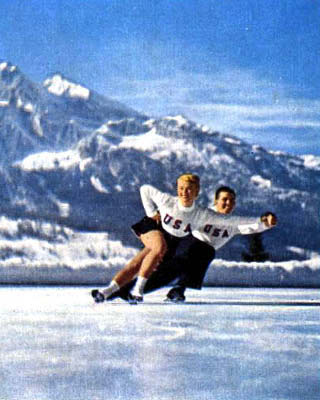
Lucille Ash and Sully Kothmann at the 1956 Winter Olympics in Cortina d'Ampezzo, Italy

Carlos Aneese "Sully" Kothmann (February 26, 1933 – May 5, 1986) was an American pair skater. After winning the bronze medal with partner Kay Servatius at the 1953 U.S. National Championships, he teamed with Lucille Ash. He and Ash were twice silver medalists at the U.S. Championships and finished seventh at the 1956 Winter Olympics. He was born in San Antonio, Texas.

== Results ==
(pairs with Ash)

Event	1954	1955	1956
Winter Olympics			7th
World Championships		8th	6th
U.S. Championships	3rd	2nd	2nd
