= Frances Dafoe =

Canadian figure skater

Frances Dafoe CM OOnt
Personal information
- Full name: Frances Helen Dafoe
- Born: December 17, 1929 Toronto, Ontario, Canada
- Died: September 23, 2016 (aged 86)

Figure skating career
- Country: Canada
- Retired: 1956
Medal record
Pairs' Figure skating
Olympic Games
Silver medal – second place	1956 Cortina d'Ampezzo	Pairs
World Championships
Silver medal – second place	1956 Garmisch-Partenkirchen	Pairs
Gold medal – first place	1955 Vienna	Pairs
Gold medal – first place	1954 Oslo	Pairs
Silver medal – second place	1953 Davos	Pairs
North American Championships
Gold medal – first place	1955 Regina	Pairs
Gold medal – first place	1953 Cleveland	Pairs

Frances Helen Dafoe CM OOnt (December 17, 1929 – September 23, 2016) was a Canadian pair skater. She was born in Toronto, Ontario. Competing with Norris Bowden, they captured four Canadian titles and two World Figure Skating Championships. They also won the silver medal at the 1956 Winter Olympics.

== Career ==
=== Pairs skating ===
Dafoe and Bowden won the 1954 World Championships in Oslo, with 11.014 points. They retained their title in 1955, this time in Vienna. They were the Canadian national champions for four years, from 1952 to 1955. In 1956, they came in second place at the World Championships in Garmisch-Partenkirchen, West Germany.

They also won the silver medal at the 1956 Winter Olympics. According to figure skating historian James R. Hines, the results were "hotly debated" and indirectly led to the inclusion of the short program or technical program in pair skating, since it only included a free skating program at the time.

The couple was coached by Sheldon Galbraith. In spite of offers Dafoe described as lucrative, she and Bowden did not elect to go professional.

=== Judging ===
After retiring from competition in 1956, they criticized the Canadian Amateur Figure Skating Association for not doing enough to support its members at tournaments. They were suspended later that year from acting as panel judges at championships, a decision they characterized as retaliation for their comments about the association.

Despite this initial setback, she ultimately served as a figure skating judge in Canada and at international competitions including the Olympics.

=== Costume design ===
Dafoe studied at the Parsons School of Design, and became a costume designer with the CBC. She worked there nearly 40 years, designing costumes for various shows. She received three Gemini Award nominations for her work in costume design, for the films Back to the Beanstalk at the 6th Gemini Awards in 1992, and both The Trial of Red Riding Hood and I'll Never Get to Heaven at the 8th Gemini Awards in 1994.

She also designed the performers' costumes for the closing ceremonies at the 1988 Winter Olympics.

In 1991, she was made a Member of the Order of Canada (CM) in recognition of her contributions as one of Canada's first world pair champions, as an international judge, and as a fashion designer.

== Personal life ==
Dafoe was married to Norman Melnick and had two sons. She and Bowden were inducted into the World Figure Skating Hall of Fame in 1984. She died on September 23, 2016, at the age of 86.

== Results ==
Pairs with Norris Bowden
Event	1951	1952	1953	1954	1955	1956
Winter Olympic Games		5th				2nd
World Championships		4th	2nd	1st	1st	2nd
North American Championships			1st		1st	
Canadian Championships	2nd	1st	1st	1st	1st	

Ice dance with Norris Bowden
Event	1950	1951	1952
Canadian Championships	3rd	3rd	1st
