= Norris Bowden =

Canadian figure skater

Personal information
- Born: August 13, 1926 Toronto, Ontario, Canada
- Died: April 9, 1991 (aged 64)

Figure skating career
- Country: Canada
- Retired: 1956
Medal record
Representing Canada
Pairs' Figure skating
Olympic Games
Silver medal – second place	1956 Cortina d'Ampezzo	Pairs
World Championships
Silver medal – second place	1956 Garmisch-Partenkirchen	Pairs
Gold medal – first place	1955 Vienna	Pairs
Gold medal – first place	1954 Oslo	Pairs
Silver medal – second place	1953 Davos	Pairs
North American Championships
Gold medal – first place	1955 Regina	Pairs
Gold medal – first place	1953 Cleveland	Pairs

Robert Norris Bowden (August 13, 1926 – April 9, 1991) was a Canadian figure skater.

Born in Toronto, Ontario, Bowden won championships in every division of Canadian figure skating. He was national men's champion as a junior and senior (1947), national pairs (junior and senior), dance (1952), waltz, and 10-step champion with Frances Dafoe, and national fours champion.

Bowden and Dafoe captured four Canadian titles (1952, 1953, 1954, 1955) and two world championships (1954, 1955). They won the silver medal at the 1956 Winter Olympics in Cortina d'Ampezzo, Italy, where Bowden was Canada's flag bearer in the opening ceremonies. Norris and his partner were the first pair skaters to do the twist lift, throw jump, ‘leap of faith’ and overhead lasso.

It was because of these two that some of the rules in pairs skating were changed. According to figure skating historian James R. Hines, the results were "hotly debated" and indirectly led to the inclusion of the short program or technical program in pair skating, since it only included a free skating program at the time.

Outside skating, Bowden graduated with an MBA and worked in the life insurance industry. He was founding president of the Centennial Nursery School for Retarded Children (now the Centennial Infant and Child Centre) in Toronto.

He was inducted into Canada's Sports Hall of Fame (1955), the Canadian Olympic Hall of Fame (1958), and the Skate Canada Hall of Fame (1993). He was inducted into the World Figure Skating Hall of Fame in 1984.

== Results ==
(men's singles)

Event	1943	1944	1946	1947
Canadian Championships	2nd J.	2nd J.	2nd	1st

- J. = Junior level

(Pairs with Frances Dafoe)

Event	1951	1952	1953	1954	1955	1956
Winter Olympic Games		5th				2nd
World Championships		4th	2nd	1st	1st	2nd
North American Championships			1st		1st	
Canadian Championships	2nd	1st	1st	1st	1st	

(pairs with Suzanne Morrow)

Event	1945	1946
Canadian Championships	1st J	2nd

(ice dance with Frances Dafoe)

Event	1950	1951	1952
Canadian Championships	3rd	3rd	1st
