= Alain Giletti =

French figure skater

Personal information
- Full name: Alain Giletti
- Born: 11 September 1939 (age 86) Bourg-en-Bresse

Figure skating career
- Country: France
Medal record
Representing France
Men's Figure skating
World Championships
Gold medal – first place	1960 Vancouver	Men's singles
Bronze medal – third place	1954 Oslo	Men's singles
Bronze medal – third place	1958 Paris	Men's singles
European Championships
Gold medal – first place	1955 Budapest	Men's singles
Gold medal – first place	1956 Paris	Men's singles
Gold medal – first place	1957 Vienna	Men's singles
Gold medal – first place	1960 Garmisch-Partenkirchen	Men's singles
Gold medal – first place	1961 Berlin	Men's singles
Silver medal – second place	1953 Dortmund	Men's singles
Silver medal – second place	1954 Bolzano	Men's singles
Silver medal – second place	1958 Bratislava	Men's singles
Silver medal – second place	1959 Davos	Men's singles

Alain Giletti (born 11 September 1939 in Bourg-en-Bresse, Ain) is a French figure skater. He is the 1960 World champion, the 1955-1957 & 1960-1961 European champion and is a ten-time (1951–1957, 1959–1961) French national champion. At the age of 12, he represented France at the 1952 Winter Olympics, where he placed 7th. He placed 4th at the 1956 Winter Olympics, and 4th again at the 1960 Winter Olympics.

He also competed as a pair skater. With partner Michèle Allard, he is the 1956 French national champion.

At the time Giletti won his World title in 1960, he was on leave from compulsory military service in France and expected to be sent on a four-month tour of Algeria upon his return. He was normally stationed in Paris where his schedule allowed him to train in the mornings with his coach Jacqueline Vaudecrane. Prior to starting his military service, he also trained in the United States with Pierre Brunet. Giletti expected to defend his World title in 1961, but those championships were cancelled after the crash of Sabena Flight 548 killed all members of the U.S. team. Giletti turned professional to tour with Holiday On Ice, Scala Eisrevue and later became a skating coach in Chamonix, France. Surya Bonaly is one of his students. He currently trains figure skating in the Angoulême area, France.

== Competitive highlights ==
Event	1951	1952	1953	1954	1955	1956	1957	1958	1959	1960	1961
Winter Olympic Games		7th				4th				4th	
World Championships		8th	5th	3rd	4th		4th	3rd	4th	1st	
European Championships		4th	2nd	2nd	1st	1st	1st	2nd	2nd	1st	1st
French Championships	1st	1st	1st	1st	1st	1st	1st	2nd	1st	1st	1st
