= Fiorella Negro =

Italian figure skater (1938–2019)

Personal information
- Born: 26 May 1938
- Died: 7 November 2019 (aged 81)

Figure skating career
- Country: Italy
- Retired: c. 1956

Fiorella Negro (26 May 1938 – 7 November 2019) was an Italian competitive figure skater. She represented Italy at the 1956 Winter Olympics in Cortina d'Ampezzo. She also appeared at three European and three World Championships. Her best result, 7th, came at the 1955 European Championships in Budapest, Hungary.

== Competitive highlights ==
International
| Event | 1952–53 | 1953–54 | 1954–55 | 1955–56 |
|---|---|---|---|---|
| Winter Olympics | | | | 15th |
| World Championships | | 17th | 16th | 13th |
| European Championships | 13th | 14th | 7th | |
National
| Italian Championships | | 1st | 1st | |
