= Rosi Pettinger =

German figure skater

Personal information
- Full name: Rosel Pettinger
- Other names: Rosl/Rose Pettinger
- Born: 16 September 1933 (age 92)

Figure skating career
- Country: West Germany
- Skating club: Münchner EV
- Retired: c. 1956

Rosel "Rosi" Pettinger (born 16 September 1933) is a German former figure skater. She won two German national titles in the 1950s and competed at the 1956 Winter Olympics in Cortina d'Ampezzo, placing tenth. She placed fourth at the 1955 European Championships in Budapest and at the 1956 European Championships in Paris. Her skating club was Münchner EV in Munich.

== Competitive highlights ==
International
Event	1952	1953	1954	1955	1956
Winter Olympics					10th
World Champ.		14th	13th	11th	
European Champ.	20th	7th	11th	4th	4th
National
German Champ.		3rd	2nd	1st	1st
