= 1958 World Figure Skating Championships =

Annual figure skating competition held in 1958

- Type: ISU Championship
- Date: February 13 – 15
- Season: 1958
- Location: Paris, France

Champions
- Men's singles: (United States) David Jenkins
- Ladies' singles: (United States) Carol Heiss
- Pairs: (Canada) Barbara Wagner / Robert Paul
- Ice dance: (United Kingdom) June Markham / Courtney Jones
- Previous: 1957 World Championships
- Next: 1959 World Championships

The World Figure Skating Championships is an annual figure skating competition sanctioned by the International Skating Union in which figure skaters compete for the title of World Champion. The 1958 competitions for men, ladies, pair skating, and ice dancing took place from February 13 to 15 in Paris, France. It was the first time that a team from the Soviet Union entered the competition.

== Medal table ==
* Host nation (France)

Rank	Nation	Gold	Silver	Bronze	Total
1	United States	2	1	1	4
2	Canada	1	1	1	3
3	Great Britain	1	0	0	1
4	Austria	0	1	1	2
5	Czechoslovakia	0	1	0	1
6	France*	0	0	1	1
Totals (6 entries)		4	4	4	12

== Results ==
=== Men ===
Rank	Name	Points	Places
1	(United States) David Jenkins	1745.2	9
2	(United States) Tim Brown	1684.4	28
3	(France) Alain Giletti	1682.7	26
4	(Canada) Donald Jackson	1641.0	44
5	(France) Alain Calmat	1621.4	46
6	(Czechoslovakia) Karol Divín	1607.0	61
7	(West Germany) Tilo Gutzeit		63
8	(United Kingdom) Michael Booker		87
9	(Canada) Edward Collins		90
10	(United States) Robert Brewer		91
11	(Canada) Charles Snelling		95
12	(United States) Thomas Moore		97
13	(Austria) Norbert Felsinger		97
14	(West Germany) Hans-Jürgen Bäumler		124
15	(West Germany) Manfred Schnelldorfer		130
16	(Austria) Peter Jonas		152
17	(Soviet Union) Lev Mikhaylov	1423.0	156
18	(Switzerland) François Pache		162
19	(Norway) Per Kjølberg		164
20	(Soviet Union) Valentin Zakharov	1376.9	180
21	(Soviet Union) Igor Persiantsev	1355.5	187
22	(Australia) William Cherrell		188
23	(Australia) Charles Keeble		207

Judges:

- (Soviet Union) Aleksey Andrianov
- (France) P. Baron
- (Switzerland) E. Fenner
- (Austria) Martin Felsenreich
- (Czechoslovakia) B. Srbová
- (Canada) Nigel Stephens
- (United States) Harold G. Storke
- (West Germany) E. Usemann
- (United Kingdom) J. Wilson

=== Ladies ===
Rank	Name	Points	Places
1	(United States) Carol Heiss	1780.6	9
2	(Austria) Ingrid Wendl	1679.0	19
3	(Austria) Hanna Walter	1596.6	41.5
4	(West Germany) Ina Bauer	1577.8	47
5	(United Kingdom) Diana Peach	1562.2	56
6	(United States) Nancy Heiss	1583.2	68
7	(United Kingdom) Patricia Pauley		79.5
8	(Netherlands) Joan Haanappel		83
9	(United States) Carol Wanek		86
10	(United States) Claralyn Lewis		89
11	(Austria) Karin Frohner		106
12	(Austria) Regine Heitzer		108
13	(Canada) Margaret Crosland		111
14	(France) Dany Rigoulot		114
15	(Canada) Sonia Snelling		116
16	(Netherlands) Sjoukje Dijkstra		127
17	(Czechoslovakia) Jindra Kramperová		131
18	(France) Corinne Altmann		169
19	(West Germany) Petra Damm		174
20	(Italy) Carla Tichatschek		186
21	(Italy) Anna Galmarini		193
22	(France) Nicole Erdos		200
23	(France) Nicole Hassler		202
24	(Switzerland) Liliane Crosa		215
25	(Australia) Lois Thomson		216
26	(Switzerland) Rita Müller		222
27	(Norway) Grete Borgen		239
28	(Norway) Karin Dehle		248
29	(Sweden) Gunhild Frylén		260

Judges:

- (Italy) Bruno Bonfiglio
- (United Kingdom) Pamela Davis
- (United States) M. Drake
- (Switzerland) E. Fenner
- (West Germany) V. P. Gross
- (Canada) G. D. Jeffery
- (Austria) Oskar Madl
- (France) Gérard Rodriguez-Henriques
- (Czechoslovakia) Emil Skákala

=== Pairs ===
Rank	Name	Points	Places
1	(Canada) Barbara Wagner / Robert Paul	101.6	10
2	(Czechoslovakia) Věra Suchánková / Zdeněk Doležal	97.6	26
3	(Canada) Maria Jelinek / Otto Jelinek	95.9	28
4	(United Kingdom) Joyce Coates / Anthony Holles	94.2	41
5	(United States) Nancy Ludington / Ronald Ludington	93.6	48
6	(West Germany) Marika Kilius / Hans-Jürgen Bäumler	93.4	48.5
7	(Hungary) Marianna Nagy / László Nagy		64.5
8	(Soviet Union) Nina Zhuk / Stanislav Zhuk	89.5	78.5
9	(United States) Mary Watson / John Jarmon		78.5
10	(Austria) Liesl Ellend / Konrad Lienert		84
11	(Hungary) Eszter Jurek / Miklós Kucharovits		98.5
12	(United Kingdom) Carolyn Krau / Rodney Ward		102
13	(Soviet Union) Lyudmila Belousova / Oleg Protopopov		119
14	(Sweden) Agneta Wale / Kristian Wale		119
15	(Norway) Ingeborg Nilsson / Reidar Børjeson		133.5

Judges:

- (Soviet Union) Aleksey Andrianov
- (Italy) Bruno Bonfiglio
- (Poland) Jadwiga Dąbrowska-Mętlewicz
- (United Kingdom) Pamela Davis
- (Austria) Martin Felsenreich
- (Czechoslovakia) Emil Skákala
- (Canada) Nigel Stephens
- (United States) Harold G. Storke
- (West Germany) E. Usemann

=== Ice dance ===
Rank	Name	Points	Places
1	(United Kingdom) June Markham / Courtney Jones	330.84	9
2	(Canada) Geraldine Fenton / William McLachlan	313.96	25
3	(United States) Andree Anderson / Donald Jacoby	310.42	35
4	(United Kingdom) Cathrine Morris / Michael Robinson	308.92	37
5	(United Kingdom) Barbara Thompson / Gerard Rigby	307.69	39
6	(France) Christiane Guhel / Jean Guhel	306.97	46
7	(Canada) Beverly Orr / Hugh Smith		61
8	(United States) Claire O'Neil / John Bejshak		72
9	(Austria) Lucia Zorn / Rudolf Zorn		96
10	(West Germany) Rita Paucka / Peter Kwiet		98
11	(Netherlands) Catharina Odink / Jacobus Odink		99
12	(France) Annick de Trentinian / Jacques Mer		102
13	(Italy) Adriana Giuggiolini / Germano Ceccattini		108
14	(West Germany) Petra Steigerwald / Hannes Burkhardt		128
15	(Italy) Ludovica Boccacci / Giancarlo Sioli		131
16	(Italy) Maria Toncelli / Vinicio Toncelli		138

Judges:

- (United Kingdom) Pauline L. Barrajo
- (United States) M. Drake
- (Netherlands) B. M. Haanappel
- (Canada) G. D. Jeffery
- (Austria) Hans Meixner
- (France) Jacqueline Meudec
- (West Germany) Hermann Schiechtl
- (Czechoslovakia) Emil Skákala
- (Italy) C. Somasca-Bianchi

== Sources ==
- Result List provided by the ISU
