= 1957 European Figure Skating Championships =

Figure skating competition

1957 European Championships
- Type: ISU Championship
- Date: February 14 – 16
- Season: 1956–57
- Location: Vienna, Austria

Champions
- Men's singles: (France) Alain Giletti
- Ladies' singles: (Austria) Hanna Eigel
- Pairs: (Czechoslovakia) Věra Suchánková / Zdeněk Doležal
- Ice dance: (United Kingdom) June Markham / Courtney Jones
- Previous: 1956 European Championships
- Next: 1958 European Championships

The 1957 European Figure Skating Championships were held on February 14–16, 1957 in Vienna, Austria. Elite senior-level figure skaters from European ISU member nations competed for the title of European Champion in the disciplines of men's singles, ladies' singles, pair skating, and ice dancing.

== Results ==
=== Men ===
Rank	Name	Places
1	(France) Alain Giletti	
2	(Czechoslovakia) Karol Divín	
3	(United Kingdom) Michael Booker	
4	(France) Alain Calmat	
5	(Austria) Norbert Felsinger	
6	(West Germany) Hans-Jürgen Bäumler	
7	(West Germany) Manfred Schnelldorfer	
8	(Soviet Union) Lev Mikhaylov	
9	(Austria) Karl Böhringer	
10	(Austria) Hanno Ströher	
11	(Soviet Union) Valentin Zakharov	
12	(Soviet Union) Oleg Simantovskiy	
13	(Soviet Union) Igor Persiantsev	
14	(Austria) Peter Jonas	
15	(Czechoslovakia) Pavel Fohler	
16	(Poland) Bogusław Hnatyszyn	

=== Ladies ===
Rank	Name	Nation
1	(Austria) Hanna Eigel	
2	(Austria) Ingrid Wendl	
3	(Austria) Hanna Walter	
4	(United Kingdom) Dianne Peach	
5	(United Kingdom) Erica Batchelor	
6	(Austria) Ilse Musyl	
7	(United Kingdom) Patricia Pauley	
8	(Czechoslovakia) Jindra Kramperová	
9	(Italy) Emma Giardini	
10	(West Germany) Ina Bauer	
11	(Hungary) Eszter Jurek	
12	(Czechoslovakia) Jitka Hlaváčková	
13	(Czechoslovakia) Jana Dočekalová	
14	(Czechoslovakia) Věra Zajíčková	
15	(France) Dany Rigoulot	
16	(Italy) Carla Tichatschek	
17	(France) Maryvonne Huet	
18	(Hungary) Helga Zöllner	
19	(Italy) Anna Galmarini	
20	(West Germany) Gitta Hägler	
21	(West Germany) Gabriele Weisert	
22	(Norway) Grete Borgen	
23	(Norway) Karin Dehle	
24	(Norway) Bjørg Olsen	

=== Pairs ===
Rank	Name	Places
1	(Czechoslovakia) Věra Suchánková / Zdeněk Doležal	
2	(Hungary) Marianna Nagy / László Nagy	
3	(West Germany) Marika Kilius / Franz Ningel	
4	(Austria) Liesl Ellend / Konrad Lienert	
5	(United Kingdom) Joyce Coates / Anthony Holles	
6	(Soviet Union) Nina Bakusheva / Stanislav Zhuk	
7	(Austria) Diana Hinko / Heinz Döpfl	
8	(Hungary) Eszter Jurek / Miklós Kucharovits	
9	(Czechoslovakia) Hana Dvořáková / Karel Vosátka	
10	(West Germany) Rita Paucka / Peter Kwiet	
11	(Poland) Barbara Jankowska / Zygmunt Kaczmarczyk	
12	(East Germany) Roswitha Mauerhofer / Günther Mauerhofer	
13	(France) Colette Tarozzi / Jean Vives	

=== Ice dance ===
Rank	Name	Places
1	(United Kingdom) June Markham / Courtney Jones	
2	(United Kingdom) Barbara Thompson / Gerard Rigby	
3	(United Kingdom) Catherine Morris / Michael Robinson	
4	(Italy) Bona Giammona / Giancarlo Sioli	
5	(West Germany) Sigrid Knake / Günther Koch	
6	(France) Christiane Elien / Claude Lambert	
7	(Austria) Edith Peikert / Hans Kutschera	
8	(Italy) Adriana Giuggiolini / Germano Ceccattini	
9	(Austria) Lucia Zorn / Rudolf Zorn	
10	(West Germany) Karin Weber / Herbert Beyer	
11	(West Germany) Rita Paucka / Peter Kwiet	
12	(Austria) Brigitte Gröger / Alois Mitterhuber	
13	(Switzerland) Christine Paschoud / Charles Pichard	
14	(Poland) Anna Bursche-Lindnerowa / Leon Osadnik	
