= 1957 World Figure Skating Championships =

Annual figure skating competition held in 1957

- Type: ISU Championship
- Date: February 26 – March 2
- Season: 1957
- Location: (United States) Colorado Springs, Colorado USA
- Venue: Broadmoor Ice Palace

Champions
- Men's singles: (United States) David Jenkins
- Ladies' singles: (United States) Carol Heiss
- Pairs: (Canada) Barbara Wagner / Robert Paul
- Ice dance: (United Kingdom) June Markham / Courtney Jones
- Previous: 1956 World Championships
- Next: 1958 World Championships

The World Figure Skating Championships is an annual figure skating competition sanctioned by the International Skating Union in which figure skaters compete for the title of World Champion. The 1957 competitions for men, ladies, pair skating, and ice dancing took place from February 26 to March 2 in Colorado Springs, Colorado, USA.

== Medal table ==
* Host nation (United States)

Rank	Nation	Gold	Silver	Bronze	Total
1	United States*	2	1	1	4
2	Canada	1	1	2	4
3	Great Britain	1	0	0	1
4	Austria	0	1	1	2
5	West Germany	0	1	0	1
Totals (5 entries)		4	4	4	12

== Results ==
=== Men ===
Rank	Name	Places
1	(United States) David Jenkins	7
2	(United States) Tim Brown	16
3	(Canada) Charles Snelling	22
4	(France) Alain Giletti	33
5	(United States) Thomas Moore	35
6	(Austria) Norbert Felsinger	41
7	(Canada) Donald Jackson	49
8	(United States) Robert Brewer	58
9	(France) Alain Calmat	59
10	(United Kingdom) Michael Booker	66
11	(West Germany) Manfred Schnelldorfer	81
12	(Switzerland) Hubert Köpfler	83
13	(Japan) Yukio Nishikura	90
14	(Japan) Hideo Sugita	98
15	(Japan) Kazuo Ōhashi	105
16	(Australia) Charles Keeble	111
17	(Australia) William Cherrell	117

Judges:

- (United Kingdom) Pamela Davis
- (Canada) P. Devine
- (United States) H. Janes
- (Switzerland) Eugen Kirchhofer
- (Austria) Walter Malek
- (West Germany) Rudolf A. Marx
- (France) Gérard Rodrigues-Henriques

=== Ladies ===
Rank	Name	Places
1	(United States) Carol Heiss	7
2	(Austria) Hanna Eigel	17
3	(Austria) Ingrid Wendl	21
4	(Canada) Yarmila Pachl	27
5	(United States) Claralyn Lewis	40
6	(Austria) Hanna Walter	43
7	(United States) Joan Schenke	63
8	(United States) Nancy Heiss	71
9	(United Kingdom) Erica Batchelor	75
10	(Canada) Karen Dixon	75
11	(West Germany) Ina Bauer	79
12	(Netherlands) Sjoukje Dijkstra	84
13	(Netherlands) Joan Haanappel	87
14	(Canada) Margaret Crosland	87
15	(Austria) Ilse Musyl	89
16	(Italy) Emma Giardini	104
17	(Japan) Junko Ueno	118
18	(Italy) Carla Tichatschek	128
19	(Japan) Yūko Araki	132
20	(Switzerland) Alice Fischer	137

Judges:

- (Italy) Bruno Bonfiglio
- (United Kingdom) Pamela Davis
- (Switzerland) Eugen Kirchhofer
- (West Germany) Rudolf A. Marx
- (Canada) J. A. McKechnie
- (Austria) Hans Meixner
- (United States) Harold G. Storke

=== Pairs ===
Rank	Name	Places
1	(Canada) Barbara Wagner / Robert Paul	8
2	(West Germany) Marika Kilius / Franz Ningel	16.5
3	(Canada) Maria Jelinek / Otto Jelinek	17.5
4	(United States) Nancy Rouillard / Ronald Ludington	31
5	(United Kingdom) Joyce Coates / Anthony Holles	32

Judges:

- (Italy) Bruno Bonfiglio
- (United Kingdom) Pamela Davis
- (United States) H. Janes
- (West Germany) Rudolf A. Marx
- (Canada) J. A. McKechnie
- (Austria) Hans Meixner
- (France) Gérard Rodrigues-Henriques

=== Ice dance ===
Rank	Name	Places
1	(United Kingdom) June Markham / Courtney Jones	5
2	(Canada) Geraldine Fenton / William McLachlan	11
3	(United States) Sharon McKenzie / Bert Wright	16
4	(United States) Joan Zamboni / Roland Junso	22
5	(United Kingdom) Barbara Thompson / Gerard Rigby	27
6	(United Kingdom) Cathrine Morris / Michael Robinson	29
7	(United States) Carmel Bodel / Edward Bodel	35
8	(Canada) Beverly Orr / Hugh Smith	39
9	(West Germany) Sigrid Knake / Günther Koch	42
10	(France) Christiane Elien / Claude Lambert	51
11	(Austria) Edith Peikert / Hans Kutschera	53

Judges:

- (Canada) P. Devine
- (Switzerland) Eugen Kirchhofer
- (Austria) Walter Malek
- (United States) John R. Shoemaker
- (United Kingdom) D. Ward

== Sources ==
- Result List provided by the ISU
