= 1956 European Figure Skating Championships =

Figure skating competition

1956 European Championships
- Type: ISU Championship
- Date: January 19 – 21
- Season: 1955–56
- Location: Paris, France

Champions
- Men's singles: (France) Alain Giletti
- Ladies' singles: (Austria) Ingrid Wendl
- Pairs: (Austria) Sissy Schwarz / Kurt Oppelt
- Ice dance: (United Kingdom) Pamela Weight / Paul Thomas
- Previous: 1955 European Championships
- Next: 1957 European Championships

The 1956 European Figure Skating Championships were held on January 19–21, 1956 in Paris, France. Elite senior-level figure skaters from European ISU member nations competed for the title of European Champion in the disciplines of men's singles, ladies' singles, pair skating, and ice dancing. It was the first time Soviet skaters competed internationally since the Russian Revolution.

== Results ==
=== Men ===
Rank	Name	Places
1	(France) Alain Giletti	
2	(United Kingdom) Michael Booker	
3	(Czechoslovakia) Karol Divín	
4	(France) Alain Calmat	
5	(West Germany) Tilo Gutzeit	
6	(Austria) Norbert Felsinger	
7	(Switzerland) François Pache	
8	(Hungary) István Szenes	
9	(United Kingdom) Brian Tuck	
10	(West Germany) Manfred Schnelldorfer	
11	(Switzerland) Hans Müller	
12	(Soviet Union) Igor Persiantsev	
13	(Austria) Hanno Ströher	
14	(West Germany) Hans-Jürgen Bäumler	
15	(Soviet Union) Lev Mikhaylov	
16	(Soviet Union) Valentin Zakharov	

=== Ladies ===
Rank	Name	Places
1	(Austria) Ingrid Wendl	
2	(United Kingdom) Yvonne Sugden	
3	(United Kingdom) Erica Batchelor	
4	(West Germany) Rosi Pettinger	
5	(Austria) Hanna Walter	
6	(United Kingdom) Dianne Peach	
7	(Netherlands) Sjoukje Dijkstra	
8	(Netherlands) Joan Haanappel	
9	(West Germany) Erika Rücker	
10	(Austria) Ilse Musyl	
11	(Italy) Emma Giardini	
12	(Switzerland) Alice Fischer	
13	(West Germany) Ina Bauer	
14	(Czechoslovakia) Jindra Kramperová	
15	(Switzerland) Karin Borner	
16	(Czechoslovakia) Jana Dočekalová	
17	(Czechoslovakia) Miloslava Tumová	
18	(France) Gilberte Naboudet	
19	(France) Corinne Altman	
20	(Czechoslovakia) Milena Kladrubská	
21	(France) Michèle Allard	

=== Pairs ===
Rank	Name	Places
1	(Austria) Sissy Schwarz / Kurt Oppelt	
2	(Hungary) Marianna Nagy / László Nagy	23
3	(West Germany) Marika Kilius / Franz Ningel	
4	(United Kingdom) Joyce Coates / Anthony Holles	
5	(Czechoslovakia) Věra Suchánková / Zdeněk Doležal	
6	(Austria) Liesl Ellend / Konrad Lienert	
7	(Hungary) Éva Szöllősi / Gábor Vida	
8	(Soviet Union) Lidiya Gerasimova / Yuriy Kiselov	
9	(United Kingdom) Carolyn Krau / Rodney Ward	
10	(West Germany) Eva Neeb / Karl Probst	
11	(Soviet Union) Maya Belenkaya / Igor Moskvin	
12	(Switzerland) Susy Holstein / Willy Wahl	
13	(East Germany) Vera Kuhrüber / Horst Kuhrüber	
14	(France) Colette Tarozzi / Jean Vives	

=== Ice dance ===
Rank	Name	Places
1	(United Kingdom) Pamela Weight / Paul Thomas	
2	(United Kingdom) June Markham / Courtney Jones	
3	(United Kingdom) Barbara Thompson / Gerard Rigby	
4	(France) Fanny Besson / Jean Guhel	
5	(West Germany) Sigrid Knake / Günther Koch	
6	(Netherlands) Catharina Odink / Jacobus Odink	
7	(Austria) Edith Peikert / Hans Kutschera	
8	(Austria) Lucia Fischer / Rudolf Zorn	
9	(West Germany) Gerda Wohlgemuth / Hannes Burkhardt	
10	(Italy) Adriana Giuggiolini / Germano Ceccattini	
11	(West Germany) Rita Paucka / Peter Kwiet	
12	(Italy) Maria Locatelli / Vinico Toncelli	
13	(Italy) Olga Cilardini / Gianfranco Canepa	
