= 1958 European Figure Skating Championships =

Figure skating competition

1958 European Championships
- Type: ISU Championship
- Date: January 30 – February 2
- Season: 1957–58
- Location: Bratislava, Czechoslovakia

Champions
- Men's singles: (Czechoslovakia) Karol Divín
- Ladies' singles: (Austria) Ingrid Wendl
- Pairs: (Czechoslovakia) Věra Suchánková / Zdeněk Doležal
- Ice dance: (United Kingdom) June Markham / Courtney Jones
- Previous: 1957 European Championships
- Next: 1959 European Championships

The 1958 European Figure Skating Championships were held in Bratislava, Czechoslovakia. Elite senior-level figure skaters from European ISU member nations competed for the title of European Champion in the disciplines of men's singles, ladies' singles, pair skating, and ice dancing.

== Results ==
=== Men ===
Rank	Name	Places
1	(Czechoslovakia) Karol Divín	
2	(France) Alain Giletti	
3	(France) Alain Calmat	
4	(United Kingdom) Michael Booker	
5	(Austria) Norbert Felsinger	
6	(West Germany) Tilo Gutzeit	
7	(West Germany) Manfred Schnelldorfer	
8	(West Germany) Hans-Jürgen Bäumler	
9	(Austria) Peter Jonas	
10	(Soviet Union) Lev Mikhaylov	
11	(Soviet Union) Valentin Zakharov	
12	(Austria) Karl Böhringer	
13	(Switzerland) François Pache	
14	(Czechoslovakia) Pavel Fohler	
15	(Czechoslovakia) Jaromír Holan	
16	(Soviet Union) Igor Persiantsev	
17	(Poland) Henryk Hanzel	
18	(Netherlands) Wouter Toledo	
19	(Poland) Marian Czakon	

=== Ladies ===
Rank	Name	Places
1	(Austria) Ingrid Wendl	
2	(Austria) Hanna Walter	
3	(Netherlands) Joan Haanappel	
4	(United Kingdom) Dianne Peach	
5	(Czechoslovakia) Jindra Kramperová	
6	(Netherlands) Sjoukje Dijkstra	
7	(Austria) Karin Frohner	
8	(Austria) Regine Heitzer	
9	(France) Dany Rigoulot	
10	(Italy) Anna Galmarini	
11	(Czechoslovakia) Jana Dočekalová	
12	(Czechoslovakia) Jitka Hlaváčková	
13	(Czechoslovakia) Julia Golonková	
14	(West Germany) Petra Damm	
15	(Switzerland) Rita Müller	
16	(West Germany) Dorle Kirchhofer	
17	(France) Nicole Erdos	
18	(West Germany) Gabriele Weidert	
19	(Hungary) Helga Zöllner	
20	(Hungary) Edina Jurek	
21	(Poland) Krystyna Wąsik	
22	(Netherlands) Jeanine Ferir	
WD	(Hungary) Eszter Jurek	DNS

=== Pairs ===
Rank	Name	Places
1	(Czechoslovakia) Věra Suchánková / Zdeněk Doležal	
2	(Soviet Union) Nina Zhuk / Stanislav Zhuk	
3	(United Kingdom) Joyce Coates / Anthony Holles	
4	(Hungary) Marianna Nagy / László Nagy	41
5	(West Germany) Marika Kilius / Hans-Jürgen Bäumler	
6	(Czechoslovakia) Hana Dvořáková / Karel Vosátka	
7	(Poland) Barbara Jankowska / Zygmunt Kaczmarczyk	
8	(Hungary) Eszter Jurek / Miklós Kucharovits	
9	(Austria) Liesl Ellend / Konrad Lienert	
10	(Soviet Union) Lyudmila Belousova / Oleg Protopopov	
11	(West Germany) Roswitha Mauerhofer / Günther Mauerhofer	
12	(Austria) Diana Hinko / Heinz Döpfl	
13	(United Kingdom) Carolyn Krau / Rodney Ward	
14	(Czechoslovakia) Marie Hezinová / Karel Janouch	
15	(West Germany) Rita Paucka / Peter Kwiet	

=== Ice dance ===
Rank	Name	Places
1	(United Kingdom) June Markham / Courtney Jones	
2	(United Kingdom) Catherine Morris / Michael Robinson	
3	(United Kingdom) Barbara Thompson / Gerard Rigby	
4	(France) Christiane Guhel / Jean Guhel	
5	(Austria) Lucia Zorn / Rudolf Zorn	
6	(Netherlands) Catharina Odink / Jacobus Odink	
7	(France) Annick de Trentinian / Philippe Aumond	
8	(Austria) Edith Peikert / Alois Miterhuber	
9	(West Germany) Rita Paucka / Peter Kwiet	
10	(Austria) Helga Michlmayr / Georg Felsinger	
11	(West Germany) Petra Steigerwald / Hannes Burkhardt	
12	(Hungary) Aranka Tóth / Endre Tóth	
13	(Soviet Union) Svetlana Smirnova / Leonid Gordon	
