= 1960 European Figure Skating Championships =

Figure skating competition

- Type: ISU Championship
- Date: February 4 – 7
- Season: 1960
- Location: Garmisch-Partenkirchen, West Germany
- Host: Deutscher Eislauf-Verband (DEV)
- Venue: Olympia-Kunsteisstadion

Champions
- Men's singles: (France) Alain Giletti
- Ladies' singles: (Netherlands) Sjoukje Dijkstra
- Pairs: (West Germany) Marika Kilius / Hans-Jürgen Bäumler
- Ice dance: (United Kingdom) Doreen Denny / Courtney Jones
- Previous: 1959 European Championships
- Next: 1961 European Championships

The 1960 European Figure Skating Championships was a figure skating competition sanctioned by the International Skating Union in which figure skaters competed for the title of European Champion in the disciplines of men's singles, ladies' singles, pair skating, and ice dancing. The competitions took place from February 4 to 7, 1960 in Garmisch-Partenkirchen, West Germany.

== Results ==
=== Men ===
Rank	Name	Places
1	(France) Alain Giletti	11
2	(Austria) Norbert Felsinger	20
3	(West Germany) Manfred Schnelldorfer	30
4	(France) Alain Calmat	31
5	(West Germany) Tilo Gutzeit	43
6	(Austria) Peter Jonas	61
7	(United Kingdom) David Clements	62
8	(Soviet Union) Lev Mikhaylov	78
9	(Norway) Per Kjølberg	81
10	(United Kingdom) Robin Jones	85
11	(Switzerland) Hubert Köpfler	103
12	(Austria) Heinrich Podhajsky	112
13	(Switzerland) François Pache	130
14	(Czechoslovakia) Pavel Fohler	133
15	(East Germany) Bodo Bockenauer	137
16	(Poland) Henryk Hanzel	138
17	(Italy) Sergio Brosio	147
18	(East Germany) Michael Flebbe	153
19	(Soviet Union) Valeriy Meshkov	155
20	(Sweden) Raymond Wiklander	180

Judges:

- (Norway) Christen Christensen
- (Switzerland) Jean Creux
- (United Kingdom) Pamela Davis
- (France) Jeanine Donnier
- (Austria) Hans Meixner
- (Czechoslovakia) Emil Skákala
- (West Germany) W. Stanek
- (Soviet Union) Tatyana Tolmachova
- (Italy) Mario Verdi

=== Ladies ===
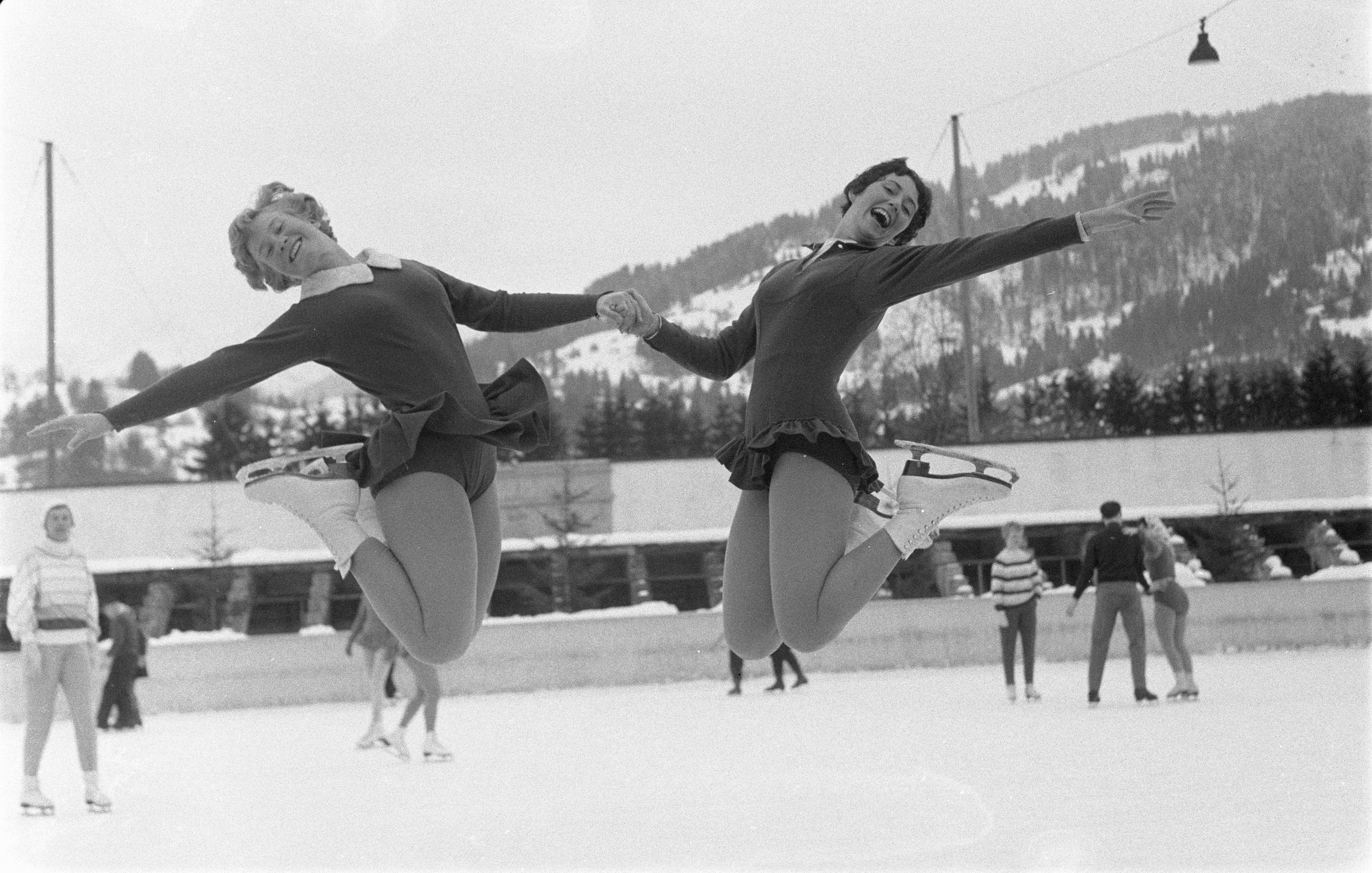
Gold medalist Sjoukje Dijkstra and bronze medalist Joan Haanappel.

Rank	Name	Places
1	(Netherlands) Sjoukje Dijkstra	9
2	(Austria) Regine Heitzer	20
3	(Netherlands) Joan Haanappel	28
4	(Austria) Karin Frohner	46
5	(Czechoslovakia) Jana Mrázková	46
6	(Italy) Anna Galmarini	56
7	(United Kingdom) Patricia Pauley	65
8	(Czechoslovakia) Jindra Kramperová	80
9	(United Kingdom) Anne Reynolds	86
10	(France) Nicole Hassler	91
11	(France) Dany Rigoulot	93
12	(United Kingdom) Carolyn Krau	116
13	(Czechoslovakia) Jitka Hlaváčková	121
14	(Italy) Carla Tichatschek	123
15	(West Germany) Bärbel Martin	140
16	(Austria) Hella Henneis	153
17	(Switzerland) Franziska Schmidt	160
18	(Hungary) Helga Zöllner	160
19	(West Germany) Ursel Barkey	167
20	(Switzerland) Liliane Crosa	177
21	(Sweden) Ann-Margreth Frei	179
22	(Belgium) Yvette Busieau	194
23	(Hungary) Edina Jurek	205
24	(Soviet Union) Tatyana Nemtsova	212
25	(Norway) Karin Dehle	223
26	(East Germany) Heidemarie Steiner	223
27	(Soviet Union) Tamara Bratus	242
WD	(West Germany) Ina Bauer	DNS

Judges:

- (Hungary) Zoltán Balázs
- (United Kingdom) Pauline L. Barrajo
- (Netherlands) Charlotte Benedict-Stieber
- (France) Jeanine Donnier
- (Austria) Oskar Madl
- (Czechoslovakia) Emil Skákala
- (West Germany) W. Stanek
- (Switzerland) Rolf J. Steinmann
- (Italy) Mario Verdi

=== Pairs ===
Rank	Name	Places
1	(West Germany) Marika Kilius / Hans-Jürgen Bäumler	10
2	(Soviet Union) Nina Zhuk / Stanislav Zhuk	13
3	(West Germany) Margret Göbl / Franz Ningel	20
4	(Soviet Union) Lyudmila Belousova / Oleg Protopopov	30
5	(Czechoslovakia) Hana Dvořáková / Karel Vosátka	34.5
6	(Czechoslovakia) Marie Hezinová / Karel Janouch	47
7	(Austria) Diana Hinko / Heinz Döpfl	52
8	(East Germany) Margit Senf / Peter Göbel	56
9	(Switzerland) Gerda Johner / Rüdi Johner	57.5
10	(Soviet Union) Tatyana Zhuk / Aleksandr Gavrilov	65
11	(West Germany) Rita Blumenberg / Werner Mensching	77

Judges:

- (East Germany) Ernst K. Bauch
- (Switzerland) Jean Creux
- (Poland) Jadwiga Dąbrowska-Mętlewicz
- (Austria) Edwin Kucharz
- (Czechoslovakia) Emil Skákala
- (Soviet Union) Tatyana Tolmachova
- (West Germany) Adolf Walker

=== Ice dance ===
Rank	Name	Places
1	(United Kingdom) Doreen Denny / Courtney Jones	7
2	(France) Christiane Guhel / Jean Guhel	14
3	(United Kingdom) Mary Parry / Roy Mason	23
4	(West Germany) Rita Paucka / Peter Kwiet	33
5	(United Kingdom) Anne Cross / Francis Williams	35
6	(West Germany) Elly Thal / Hannes Burkhardt	41
7	(Czechoslovakia) Eva Romanová / Pavel Roman	45
8	(France) Armelle Flichy / Pierre Brun	58
9	(West Germany) Margot Nissen / Gerhard Maier	69
10	(Italy) Olga Gilardi / Germano Ceccattini	71
11	(France) Annick de Trentinian / Jacques Mer	75
12	(Italy) Ludovica Boccacci / Gianfranco Canepa	81
13	(Hungary) Györgyi Korda / Pál Vásárhelyi	88
14	(Austria) Helga Michlmayr / Georg Felsinger	95
WD	(Netherlands) Catharina Odink / Jacobus Odink	DNS
WD	(Poland) Elżbieta Zdankiewicz / Emanuel Koczyba	DNS

Judges:

- (Hungary) Zoltán Balázs
- (United Kingdom) Pauline L. Barrajo
- (Italy) Giovanni Bozetti
- (Austria) Edwin Kucharz
- (France) Jacqueline Meudec
- (West Germany) Hermann Schiechtl
- (Czechoslovakia) Emil Skákala

== Sources ==
- Result List provided by the ISU
- printed program of the Europeans
