= 1959 European Figure Skating Championships =

Figure skating competition

1959 European Championships
- Type: ISU Championship
- Season: 1958–59
- Location: Davos, Switzerland

Champions
- Men's singles: (Czechoslovakia) Karol Divín
- Ladies' singles: (Austria) Hanna Walter
- Pairs: (West Germany) Marika Kilius / Hans-Jürgen Bäumler
- Ice dance: (United Kingdom) Doreen Denny / Courtney Jones
- Previous: 1958 European Championships
- Next: 1960 European Championships

The 1959 European Figure Skating Championships were held in Davos, Switzerland. Elite senior-level figure skaters from European ISU member nations competed for the title of European Champion in the disciplines of men's singles, ladies' singles, pair skating, and ice dancing.

== Results ==
=== Men ===
Rank	Name	Places
1	(Czechoslovakia) Karol Divín	
2	(France) Alain Giletti	
3	(Austria) Norbert Felsinger	
4	(France) Alain Calmat	
5	(West Germany) Manfred Schnelldorfer	
6	(West Germany) Tilo Gutzeit	
7	(Austria) Peter Jonas	
8	(United Kingdom) David Clements	
9	(Switzerland) Hubert Köpfler	
10	(Soviet Union) Lev Mikhaylov	
11	(Switzerland) François Pache	
12	(Italy) Sergio Brosio	
13	(East Germany) Bodo Bockenauer	
14	(Soviet Union) Igor Persiantsev	
15	(Austria) Karl Böhringer	
16	(Poland) Henryk Hanzel	
17	(Netherlands) Wouter Toledo	
18	(West Germany) Jochen Niemann	

=== Ladies ===
Rank	Name	Places
1	(Austria) Hanna Walter	
2	(Netherlands) Sjoukje Dijkstra	
3	(Netherlands) Joan Haanappel	
4	(West Germany) Ina Bauer	
5	(Austria) Regine Heitzer	
6	(Czechoslovakia) Jindra Kramperová	
7	(Czechoslovakia) Jana Dočekalová	
8	(France) Dany Rigoulot	
9	(United Kingdom) Diana Clifton-Peach	
10	(Switzerland) Liliane Crosa	
11	(Italy) Anna Galmarini	
12	(Czechoslovakia) Jitka Hlaváčková	
13	(Italy) Carla Tichatschek	
14	(Switzerland) Franziska Schmidt	
15	(United Kingdom) Carolyn Krau	
16	(France) Nicole Hassler	
17	(West Germany) Bärbel Martin	
18	(Austria) Roswitha Sodoma	
19	(France) Corinne Altmann	
20	(Hungary) Helga Zöllner	
21	(West Germany) Ursel Barkey	
22	(Hungary) Edina Jurek	
23	(Norway) Karin Dehle	
24	(Soviet Union) Tatyana Nemtsova	
25	(Netherlands) Jeanine Ferir	
26	(Hungary) Éva Csoma	
27	(Soviet Union) Irina Lyulyakova	
28	(Poland) Krystyna Wąsik	

=== Pairs ===
Rank	Name	Places
1	(West Germany) Marika Kilius / Hans-Jürgen Bäumler	
2	(Soviet Union) Nina Zhuk / Stanislav Zhuk	
3	(United Kingdom) Joyce Coates / Anthony Holles	
4	(West Germany) Margret Göbl / Franz Ningel	
5	(West Germany) Rita Blumenberg / Werner Mensching	
6	(Czechoslovakia) Hana Dvořáková / Karel Vosatka	
7	(Soviet Union) Lyudmila Belousova / Oleg Protopopov	
8	(Austria) Diana Hinko / Heinz Dopfl	
9	(Poland) Barbara Jankowska / Zygmunt Kaczmarczyk	
10	(East Germany) Roswitha Mauerhofer / Günther Mauerhofer	
11	(Switzerland) Gerda Johner / Rüdi Johner	
12	(Czechoslovakia) Eva Romanová / Pavel Roman	

=== Ice dance ===
Rank	Name	Places
1	(United Kingdom) Doreen Denny / Courtney Jones	
2	(United Kingdom) Catherine Morris / Michael Robinson	
3	(France) Christiane Guhel / Jean Guhel	
4	(West Germany) Rita Paucka / Peter Kwiet	
5	(West Germany) Elly Thal / Hannes Burkhardt	
6	(Austria) Lucia Zorn / Rudolf Zorn	
7	(Czechoslovakia) Eva Romanová / Pavel Roman	
8	(France) Annick de Trentinian / Philippe Aumond	
9	(Netherlands) Catharina Odink / Jacobus Odink	
10	(Italy) Adriana Giuggiolini / Germano Ceccattini	
11	(Austria) Helga Michlmayr / Georg Felsinger	
12	(Switzerland) Danielle Jaton / Charles Pichard	
13	(Italy) Maria Toncelli / Vinicio Toncelli	
14	(Italy) Ludovica Boccacci / Gianfranco Canepa	
15	(Poland) Elżbieta Zdankiewicz / Emanuel Koczyba	
