= 1956 World Figure Skating Championships =

Annual figure skating competition held in 1956

- Type: ISU Championship
- Date: February 16 – 19
- Season: 1956
- Location: Garmisch-Partenkirchen, West Germany

Champions
- Men's singles: (United States) Hayes Alan Jenkins
- Ladies' singles: (United States) Carol Heiss
- Pairs: (Austria) Sissy Schwarz / Kurt Oppelt
- Ice dance: (United Kingdom) Pamela Weight / Paul Thomas
- Previous: 1955 World Championships
- Next: 1957 World Championships

The World Figure Skating Championships is an annual figure skating competition sanctioned by the International Skating Union in which figure skaters compete for the title of World Champion.

The 1956 competitions for men, ladies, pair skating, and ice dancing took place from February 16 to 19 in Garmisch-Partenkirchen, West Germany.

== Medal table ==
* Host nation (West Germany)

Rank	Nation	Gold	Silver	Bronze	Total
1	United States	2	2	1	5
2	Great Britain	1	1	1	3
3	Austria	1	0	1	2
4	Canada	0	1	0	1
5	West Germany*	0	0	1	1
Totals (5 entries)		4	4	4	12

== Results ==
=== Men ===
Rank	Name	Places
1	(United States) Hayes Jenkins	10
2	(United States) Ronald Robertson	17
3	(United States) David Jenkins	28
4	(Canada) Charles Snelling	42
5	(United Kingdom) Michael Booker	48
6	(Czechoslovakia) Karol Divín	48
7	(France) Alain Calmat	65
8	(Austria) Norbert Felsinger	71
9	(West Germany) Tilo Gutzeit	77
10	(Switzerland) François Pache	91
11	(Australia) Allan Ganter	109
12	(West Germany) Hans-Jürgen Bäumler	111
13	(Switzerland) Hans Müller	113
14	(Austria) Hanno Ströher	115
15	(Spain) Darío Villalba	137
16	(Australia) Charles Keeble	142
WD	(West Germany) Manfred Schnelldorfer	DNS

Judges:

- (West Germany) K. Beyer
- (Australia) Sydney R. Croll
- (Austria) H. Deistler
- (Switzerland) Emile Finsterwald
- (United States) H. Kendall Kelley
- (Canada) Ralph McCreath
- (United Kingdom) Mollie Phillips
- (France) Gérard Rodrigues-Henriques
- (Czechoslovakia) B. Srbová

=== Ladies ===
Rank	Name	Places
1	(United States) Carol Heiss	13
2	(United States) Tenley Albright	14
3	(Austria) Ingrid Wendl	33
4	(United Kingdom) Yvonne Sugden	37
5	(Austria) Hanna Eigel	48
6	(United States) Catherine Machado	49
7	(Austria) Hanna Walter	71
8	(United Kingdom) Erica Batchelor	72
9	(Canada) Ann Johnston	72
10	(United States) Mary Dorsey	97
11	(Netherlands) Joan Haanappel	103
12	(United Kingdom) Diana Peach	107
13	(Italy) Fiorella Negro	128
14	(Italy) Emma Giardini	130
15	(Czechoslovakia) Jindra Kramperová	131
16	(Netherlands) Sjoukje Dijkstra	144
17	(Switzerland) Karin Borner	155
18	(Austria) Ilse Musyl	161
19	(Switzerland) Alice Fischer	168
20	(West Germany) Ina Bauer	171
21	(Czechoslovakia) Jana Dočekalová	175

Judges:

- (Italy) Ercole Cattaneo
- (United States) Otto Dallmayr
- (United Kingdom) Pamela Davis
- (Switzerland) Emile Finsterwald
- (West Germany) V. P. Gross
- (Austria) Ernst Labin
- (Canada) Ralph McCreath
- (France) Gérard Rodrigues-Henriques
- (Czechoslovakia) B. Srbová

=== Pairs ===
Rank	Name	Places
1	(Austria) Sissy Schwarz / Kurt Oppelt	14
2	(Canada) Frances Dafoe / Norris Bowden	15
3	(West Germany) Marika Kilius / Franz Ningel	30
4	(United States) Carole Ormaca / Robin Greiner	34
5	(Canada) Barbara Wagner / Robert Paul	42.5
6	(United States) Lucille Ash / Sully Kothmann	68.5
7	(United Kingdom) Joyce Coates / Anthony Holles	70
8	(Austria) Liesl Ellend / Konrad Lienert	74.5
9	(United Kingdom) Carolyn Patricia Krau / Rodney Ward	75.5
10	(West Germany) Eva Neeb / Karl Probst	80.5
11	(Australia) Jacqueline Mason / Mervyn Bower	88.5

Judges:

- (United Kingdom) Pauline L. Barrajo
- (West Germany) K. Beyer
- (Italy) Ercole Cattaneo
- (Australia) Sydney R. Croll
- (United States) Otto Dallmayr
- (Switzerland) Emile Finsterwald
- (Canada) Ralph McCreath
- (Czechoslovakia) B. Srbová
- (Austria) Franz Wojtanowskyj

=== Ice dance ===
Rank	Name	Places
1	(United Kingdom) Pamela Weight / Paul Thomas	7
2	(United Kingdom) June Markham / Courtney Jones	15
3	(United Kingdom) Barbara Thompson / Gerard Rigby	29
4	(United States) Joan Zamboni / Roland Junso	37
5	(France) Fanny Besson / Jean Guhel	38
6	(United States) Carmel Bodel / Edward Bodel	39
7	(United States) Sidney Arnold / Franklin Nelson	47
8	(West Germany) Sigrid Knake / Günther Koch	49
9	(Canada) Lindis Johnston / Jeffrey Johnston	74.5
10	(West Germany) Gerda Wohlgemuth / Hannes Burkhardt	76.5
11	(Austria) Edith Peikert / Hans Kutschera	77
12	(Italy) Bona Giammona / Giancarlo Sioli	82
13	(Austria) Lucia Fischer / Rudolf Zorn	88
14	(Netherlands) Catharina Odink / Jacobus Odink	91
15	(Italy) Adriana Giuggiolini / Germano Ceccattini	94
16	(West Germany) Rita Paucka / Peter Kwiet	109
17	(Italy) Maria Locatelli / Vinicio Toncelli	117

Judges:

- (Italy) P. Farinet
- (Switzerland) A. Jobin
- (United States) H. Kendall Kelley
- (France) Henri Meudec
- (West Germany) Hermann Schiechtl
- (United Kingdom) D. Ward
- (Austria) Franz Wojtanowskyj

== Sources ==
- Result List provided by the ISU
