= 1955 European Figure Skating Championships =

Figure skating competition

1955 European Championships
- Type: ISU Championship
- Date: January 27 – 30
- Season: 1954–55
- Location: Budapest, Hungary
- Venue: City Park Ice Rink

Champions
- Men's singles: (France) Alain Giletti
- Ladies' singles: (Austria) Hanna Eigel
- Pairs: (Hungary) Marianna Nagy / László Nagy
- Ice dance: (United Kingdom) Jean Westwood / Laurence Demmy
- Previous: 1954 European Championships
- Next: 1956 European Championships

The 1955 European Figure Skating Championships were held at the City Park Ice Rink in Budapest, Hungary from January 27 to 30. Elite senior-level figure skaters from European ISU member nations competed for the title of European Champion in the disciplines of men's singles, ladies' singles, pair skating, and ice dancing.

== Results ==
=== Men ===
Rank	Name	Places
1	(France) Alain Giletti	
2	(United Kingdom) Michael Booker	
3	(Czechoslovakia) Karol Divín	
4	(Austria) Norbert Felsinger	
5	(France) Alain Calmat	
6	(Hungary) István Szenes	41
7	(West Germany) Tilo Gutzeit	
8	(Switzerland) Hans Müller	
9	(Hungary) György Czakó	
10	(West Germany) Manfred Schnelldorfer	
11	(Czechoslovakia) Ivan Mauer	
12	(Czechoslovakia) Miroslav Kutina	
13	(Poland) Emanuel Koczyba	
14	(Poland) Leon Osadnyk	

=== Ladies ===
Rank	Name	Places
1	(Austria) Hanna Eigel	
2	(United Kingdom) Yvonne Sugden	
3	(United Kingdom) Erica Batchelor	
4	(West Germany) Rosi Pettinger	
5	(Austria) Hanna Walter	
6	(France) Maryvonne Huet	
7	(Italy) Fiorella Negro	
8	(Czechoslovakia) Miroslava Náchodská	
9	(West Germany) Erika Rücker	
10	(Czechoslovakia) Dagmar Řeháková	
11	(Switzerland) Alice Fischer	
12	(France) Michèle Allard	
13	(Austria) Ilse Musyl	
14	(France) Christianne Moreux	
15	(Hungary) Eszter Jurek	
16	(Italy) Manuela Angeli	
17	(France) Gilberte Naboudet	
18	(Czechoslovakia) Miloslava Tumová	
19	(Italy) Luisella Gaspari	
20	(Czechoslovakia) Milena Kladrubská	
21	(Hungary) Hedvig Pálinkás	
22	(Poland) Barbara Jankowska	

=== Pairs ===
Rank	Name	Places
1	(Hungary) Marianna Nagy / László Nagy	5
2	(Czechoslovakia) Věra Suchánková / Zdeněk Doležal	
3	(West Germany) Marika Kilius / Franz Ningel	
4	(Austria) Liesl Ellend / Konrad Lienert	
5	(West Germany) Alice Zettel / Klaus Loichinger	
6	(United Kingdom) Vivien Higson / Robert Hudson	
7	(Czechoslovakia) Soňa Buriánová / Miloslav Balun	
8	(Hungary) Éva Szöllősi / Gábor Vida	
9	(Poland) Anna Bursche-Lindnerowa / Leon Osadnyk	

=== Ice dance ===
Rank	Name	Places
1	(United Kingdom) Jean Westwood / Laurence Demmy	
2	(United Kingdom) Pamela Weight / Paul Thomas	
3	(United Kingdom) Barbara Radford / Raymond Lockwood	
4	(France) Fanny Besson / Jean Guhel	
5	(West Germany) Sigrid Knake / Günther Koch	
6	(Italy) Bona Giammona / Giancarlo Sioli	
7	(Austria) Lucia Fischer / Rudolf Zorn	
8	(Austria) Edith Peikert / Hans Kutschera	
9	(Hungary) Rózsa Madarász / Gyula Madarász	
10	(Netherlands) Catharina Odink / Jacobus Odink	
11	(Hungary) Edit Parádi / József Parádi	
12	(Austria) Luise Lehner / Georg Lenitz	
13	(Hungary) Aranka Tóth / Endre Tóth	
14	(West Germany) Maria Göth / Willi Wernz	
