= 1963 World Figure Skating Championships =

Annual figure skating competition held in 1963

- Type: ISU Championship
- Date: February 28 – March 3
- Season: 1963
- Location: Cortina d'Ampezzo, Italy

Champions
- Men's singles: (Canada) Donald McPherson
- Ladies' singles: (Netherlands) Sjoukje Dijkstra
- Pairs: (West Germany) Marika Kilius / Hans-Jürgen Bäumler
- Ice dance: (Czechoslovakia) Eva Romanová / Pavel Roman
- Previous: 1962 World Championships
- Next: 1964 World Championships

The World Figure Skating Championships is an annual figure skating competition sanctioned by the International Skating Union in which figure skaters compete for the title of World Champion.

The 1963 competitions for men's singles, ladies' singles, pair skating, and ice dance took place from February 28 to March 3 in Cortina d'Ampezzo, Italy. The competition was held in the open-air ice stadium, with events running as late as 1 or 2am, by which time it was very cold. This caused the ice to become hard and brittle, as well as causing discomfort to those in attendance.

Perhaps due to the poor ice conditions, the men's competition was marred by many falls. Both the winner Donald McPherson and second-place finisher Alain Calmat fell on triple loop attempts, but neither Manfred Schnelldorfer nor Karol Divín, who had been placed 1-2 after the compulsory figures, performed well in the free skating.

Marika Kilius and Hans-Jürgen Bäumler won the pair competition, although some questioned whether some of their lifts, including a "triple Axel lift" (an Axel lasso lift with 3.5 rotations), were legal under the ISU rules of the time. The Canadian team of Debbi Wilkes and Guy Revell had to withdraw after Wilkes suffered a head injury in a fall while posing for press photos.

Disaster also struck the American dance team Yvonne Littlefield and Peter Betts. They placed 9th in the compulsory dances, but in the free dance Betts's blade came unscrewed from the boot and they were unable to finish their program. Meanwhile, the defending champions Eva Romanová and Pavel Roman came from behind to retain title after being defeated in the compulsory dances by the British team, Linda Shearman and Michael Phillips, who had also defeated the Romans at the European Championships earlier that year.

Defending champion Sjoukje Dijkstra also retained her title, building a big lead in the compulsory figures and following it with a good performance in the free skate, in which she now included a double Lutz for the first time. Nicole Hassler, second in the free skate and third overall, had two strong double Axels at the end of her program. The Japanese competitor Miwa Fukuhara, who finished 6th overall, included a triple salchow in her program.

== Medal table ==
* Host nation (Italy)

| Rank | Nation | Gold | Silver | Bronze | Total |
|---|---|---|---|---|---|
| 1 | Canada | 1 | 0 | 1 | 2 |
| 1 | West Germany | 1 | 0 | 1 | 2 |
| 3 | Czechoslovakia | 1 | 0 | 0 | 1 |
| 3 | Netherlands | 1 | 0 | 0 | 1 |
| 5 | France | 0 | 1 | 1 | 2 |
| 5 | Soviet Union | 0 | 1 | 1 | 2 |
| 7 | Austria | 0 | 1 | 0 | 1 |
| 7 | Great Britain | 0 | 1 | 0 | 1 |
| Totals (8 entries) | | 4 | 4 | 4 | 12 |

== Results ==
=== Men ===
| Rank | Name | Places |
|---|---|---|
| 1 | (Canada) Donald McPherson | 18 |
| 2 | (France) Alain Calmat | 22 |
| 3 | (West Germany) Manfred Schnelldorfer | 22 |
| 4 | (Czechoslovakia) Karol Divín | 34 |
| 5 | (United States) Scott Allen | 40 |
| 6 | (Austria) Peter Jonas | 59 |
| 7 | (West Germany) Sepp Schönmetzler | 71 |
| 8 | (Canada) Donald Knight | 79 |
| 9 | (Austria) Emmerich Danzer | 80 |
| 10 | (Japan) Nobuo Satō | 83 |
| 11 | (United States) Monty Hoyt | 88 |
| 12 | (France) Robert Dureville | 117 |
| 13 | (West Germany) Hugo Dümmler | 122 |
| 14 | (Hungary) Jenő Ébert | 130 |
| 15 | (Canada) William Neale | 136 |
| 16 | (Soviet Union) Valeriy Meshkov | 144 |
| 17 | (Italy) Giordano Abbondati | 145 |
| 18 | (United Kingdom) Malcolm Cannon | 159 |
| 19 | (Netherlands) Wouter Toledo | 161 |

Judges:

- (Netherlands) Charlotte Benedict-Stieber
- (Czechoslovakia) Zdeněk Fikar
- (Austria) Edwin Kucharz
- (Canada) J. A. McKechnie
- (Italy) Giovanni de Mori
- (United Kingdom) Pamela Peat
- (United States) John R. Shoemaker
- (France) Néri Valdes
- (West Germany) Adolf Walker

=== Ladies ===
| Rank | Name | Places |
|---|---|---|
| 1 | (Netherlands) Sjoukje Dijkstra | 9 |
| 2 | (Austria) Regine Heitzer | 22 |
| 3 | (France) Nicole Hassler | 30 |
| 4 | (Canada) Wendy Griner | 36 |
| 5 | (Canada) Petra Burka | 39 |
| 6 | (Japan) Miwa Fukuhara | 68 |
| 7 | (West Germany) Inge Paul | 73 |
| 8 | (Czechoslovakia) Jana Mrázková | 73 |
| 9 | (Austria) Helli Sengstschmid | 75 |
| 10 | (United States) Lorraine Hanlon | 89 |
| 11 | (United Kingdom) Diana Clifton-Peach | 97 |
| 12 | (Austria) Ingrid Ostler | 110 |
| 13 | (United States) Karen Howland | 130 |
| 14 | (Switzerland) Franziska Schmidt | 128 |
| 15 | (Czechoslovakia) Eva Grožajová | 138 |
| 16 | (Sweden) Ann-Margreth Frei | 140 |
| 17 | (Japan) Junko Ueno | 147 |
| 18 | (Italy) Sandra Brugnera | 160 |
| 19 | (United States) Christine Haigler | 161 |
| 20 | (Canada) Shirra Kenworthy | 167 |
| 21 | (Hungary) Zsuzsa Szentmiklóssy | 191 |
| 22 | (Norway) Karin Dehle | 198 |
| 23 | (Soviet Union) Tatyana Nemtsova | 204 |
| 24 | (Poland) Elżbieta Kościk | 215 |

Judges:

- (Netherlands) Charlotte Benedict-Stieber
- (Switzerland) Walter Fritz
- (West Germany) Theo Klemm
- (Austria) Oskar Madl
- (Canada) E. R. S. McLauchlin
- (France) Gérard Rodrigues-Henriques
- (United States) Ardelle Sanderson
- (Czechoslovakia) Emil Skákala
- (Soviet Union) Sergey Vasilyev

=== Pairs ===
| Rank | Name | Places |
|---|---|---|
| 1 | (West Germany) Marika Kilius / Hans-Jürgen Bäumler | 9 |
| 2 | (Soviet Union) Lyudmila Belousova / Oleg Protopopov | 20 |
| 3 | (Soviet Union) Tatyana Zhuk / Aleksandr Gavrilov | 31 |
| 4 | (Canada) Gertrude Desjardins / Maurice Lefrance | 31.5 |
| 5 | (Czechoslovakia) Milada Kubíková / Jaroslav Votruba | 51.5 |
| 6 | (Switzerland) Gerda Johner / Rüdi Johner | 58.5 |
| 7 | (United States) Judianne Fotheringill / Jerry Fotheringill | 64 |
| 8 | (United States) Vivian Joseph / Ronald Joseph | 66.5 |
| 9 | (United States) Patti Gustafson / Pieter Kollen | 84 |
| 10 | (West Germany) Sonja Pfersdorf / Günther Matzdorf | 84 |
| 11 | (Canada) Linda Ward / Neil Carpenter | 95 |
| 12 | (Sweden) Gunilla Lindberg / Gunnar de Shàrengrad | 107 |

Judges:

- (Czechoslovakia) Zdeněk Fikar
- (Switzerland) Walter Fritz
- (Austria) Walter Malek
- (Canada) E. R. S. McLauchlin
- (United States) Ardelle Sanderson
- (Hungary) Elemér Terták
- (France) Néri Valdes
- (Soviet Union) Sergey Vasilyev
- (West Germany) János Zsigmondy

=== Ice dance ===
| Rank | Name | Places |
|---|---|---|
| 1 | (Czechoslovakia) Eva Romanová / Pavel Roman | 14 |
| 2 | (United Kingdom) Linda Shearman / Michael Phillips | 15 |
| 3 | (Canada) Paulette Doan / Kenneth Ormsby | 26 |
| 4 | (United Kingdom) Janet Sawbridge / David Hickinbottom | 36 |
| 5 | (Canada) Donna Mitchell / John Mitchell | 47 |
| 6 | (United Kingdom) Mary Parry / Roy Mason | 62 |
| 7 | (United States) Sally Schantz / Stanley Urban | 66 |
| 8 | (United States) Lorna Dyer / John Carrell | 71 |
| 9 | (Hungary) Györgyi Korda / Pál Vásárhelyi | 82 |
| 10 | (Canada) Carole Forrest / Kevin Lethbridge | 93 |
| 11 | (Switzerland) Marlyse Fornachon / Charly Pichard | 96 |
| 12 | (France) Armelle Flichy / Pierre Brun | 116 |
| 13 | (West Germany) Helga Burkhardt / Hannes Burkhardt | 117 |
| 14 | (Czechoslovakia) Jitka Babická / Jaromír Holan | 120 |
| 15 | (Austria) Christel Trebesiner / Georg Felsinger | 132 |
| 16 | (France) Ghislaine Houdas / Francis Gamichon | 141 |
| 17 | (United States) Yvonne Littlefield / Peter Betts | 152 |
| 18 | (Italy) Maria Toncelli / Vinicio Toncelli | 153 |

Judges:

- (Italy) Cia Benacchi-Bordogna
- (France) Claude Lambert
- (Canada) J. A. McKechnie
- (Austria) Hans Meixner
- (United Kingdom) Mollie Phillips
- (United States) John R. Shoemaker
- (Czechoslovakia) Emil Skákala
- (Hungary) Elemér Terták
- (West Germany) Hermann Wollersen
