= 1962 World Figure Skating Championships =

Annual figure skating competition held in 1962

- Type: ISU Championship
- Date: March 14 – 17
- Season: 1962
- Location: Prague, Czechoslovakia
- Venue: Sportovní hala ČSTV

Champions
- Men's singles: (Canada) Donald Jackson
- Ladies' singles: (Netherlands) Sjoukje Dijkstra
- Pairs: (Canada) Maria Jelinek and Otto Jelinek
- Ice dance: (Czechoslovakia) Eva Romanová and Pavel Roman
- Previous: 1960 World Championships
- Next: 1963 World Championships

The World Figure Skating Championships is an annual figure skating competition sanctioned by the International Skating Union in which figure skaters compete for the title of World Champion.

The 1962 competitions for men's singles, ladies' singles, pair skating, and ice dance took place from March 14 to 17 at the Sportovní hala ČSTV in Prague, Czechoslovakia. The Figure Skating World Championships in Prague were originally planned for 1961, but were cancelled due to the crash of Sabena Flight 548, which killed everyone on board the plane, including the entire US figure skating team.

East Germany participated in the World Figure Skating Championships for the first time.

This competition is best remembered for Donald Jackson's come-from-behind victory in the men's event with a tour-de-force free skating that included the first triple lutz jump ever landed in competition as well as a triple salchow jump and 20 other double and single jumps, including jumps in opposite directions and jumps with variations in arm position or delayed rotation. Jackson received 7 perfect 6.0 scores for this performance.

Prague hometown favorites Eva Romanová / Pavel Roman won the dance event - breaking the British domination of this discipline - and Canadians Maria Jelinek / Otto Jelinek were the winners in the pairs. As children, the Jelineks had defected from Czechoslovakia with their parents after the post-war Communist takeover, and there were significant fears for their safety in returning to their home country. The "official" story that had been circulated at the time of the previous year's planned competition was that they were merely of Czech descent. The Jelineks' chief competitors, 1960 runners-up Marika Kilius / Hans-Jürgen Bäumler, were forced to withdraw from the competition after colliding on side-by-side jumps during their program, and the silver medal was won by Lyudmila Belousova / Oleg Protopopov.

== Medal table ==
* Host nation (Czechoslovakia)

| Rank | Nation | Gold | Silver | Bronze | Total |
|---|---|---|---|---|---|
| 1 | Canada | 2 | 1 | 1 | 4 |
| 2 | Czechoslovakia* | 1 | 1 | 0 | 2 |
| 3 | Netherlands | 1 | 0 | 0 | 1 |
| 4 | France | 0 | 1 | 1 | 2 |
| 5 | Soviet Union | 0 | 1 | 0 | 1 |
| 6 | Austria | 0 | 0 | 1 | 1 |
| 6 | West Germany | 0 | 0 | 1 | 1 |
| Totals (7 entries) | | 4 | 4 | 4 | 12 |

== Results ==
=== Men ===
| Rank | Name | Points | Places |
|---|---|---|---|
| 1 | (Canada) Donald Jackson | 2277.1 | 13 |
| 2 | (Czechoslovakia) Karol Divín | 2255.9 | 17 |
| 3 | (France) Alain Calmat | 2200.7 | 25 |
| 4 | (Canada) Donald McPherson | 2172.3 | 37 |
| 5 | (West Germany) Manfred Schnelldorfer | 2094.0 | 54 |
| 6 | (United States) Monty Hoyt | 2059.1 | 59 |
| 7 | (Austria) Emmerich Danzer | 2033.8 | 68 |
| 8 | (United States) Scott Allen | 2002.8 | 81 |
| 9 | (Austria) Peter Jonas | 2005.5 | 82 |
| 10 | (Japan) Nobuo Satō | 1984.7 | 92 |
| 11 | (East Germany) Bodo Bockenauer | | 97 |
| 12 | (United Kingdom) Robin Jones | | 101 |
| 13 | (West Germany) Sepp Schönmetzler | | 109 |
| 14 | (Soviet Union) Valeriy Meshkov | 1895.7 | 117 |
| 15 | (Norway) Per Kjølberg | | 137 |
| 16 | (Hungary) Károly Újlaky | 1832.4 | 142 |
| 17 | (France) Robert Dureville | | 149 |
| 18 | (France) Alain Trouillet | | 159 |

Judges:

- (East Germany) Ernst K. Bauch
- (United Kingdom) Pamela Davis
- (France) Jeanine Donnier-Blanc
- (Czechoslovakia) Milan Duchoň
- (Soviet Union) Georgiy Felitsyn
- (Canada) Norman V. S. Gregory
- (Hungary) A. Koutny
- (West Germany) Adolf Walker
- (Austria) Franz Wojtanowskyj

=== Ladies ===
| Rank | Name | Points | Places |
|---|---|---|---|
| 1 | (Netherlands) Sjoukje Dijkstra | 2350.0 | 9 |
| 2 | (Canada) Wendy Griner | 2273.2 | 21 |
| 3 | (Austria) Regine Heitzer | 2218.3 | 39 |
| 4 | (Canada) Petra Burka | 2219.7 | 42 |
| 5 | (United States) Barbara Roles | 2200.9 | 52 |
| 6 | (France) Nicole Hassler | 2172.0 | 64 |
| 7 | (Czechoslovakia) Jana Mrázková | 2151.8 | 71 |
| 8 | (Austria) Karin Frohner | 2144.6 | 79 |
| 9 | (Japan) Miwa Fukuhara | 2137.0 | 81 |
| 10 | (United States) Lorraine Hanlon | 2103.0 | 98 |
| 11 | (United Kingdom) Jacqueline Harbord | | 101 |
| 12 | (Austria) Helli Sengstschmid | | 101 |
| 13 | (Czechoslovakia) Eva Grožajová | | 105 |
| 14 | (Switzerland) Franziska Schmidt | | 108 |
| 15 | (West Germany) Karin Gude | | 122 |
| 16 | (United States) Victoria Fisher | | 148 |
| 17 | (Sweden) Ann-Margreth Frei | | 159 |
| 18 | (Italy) Sandra Brugnera | | 161 |
| 19 | (Hungary) Helga Zöllner | 1968.7 | 166 |
| 20 | (Soviet Union) Tatyana Nemtsova | 1952.2 | 174 |
| 21 | (East Germany) Gabriele Seyfert | | 178 |

Judges:

- (East Germany) Ernst K. Bauch
- (France) Jeanine Donnier-Blanc
- (United States) M. Drake
- (Czechoslovakia) Helena Dudová
- (Netherlands) Paul Engelfriet
- (Austria) Martin Felsenreich
- (Hungary) A. Koutny
- (Canada) Melville Rogers
- (West Germany) Adolf Walker

=== Pairs ===
| Rank | Name | Points | Places |
|---|---|---|---|
| 1 | (Canada) Maria Jelinek / Otto Jelinek | 102.2 | 15 |
| 2 | (Soviet Union) Lyudmila Belousova / Oleg Protopopov | 102.1 | 16.5 |
| 3 | (West Germany) Margret Göbl / Franz Ningel | 100.1 | 25.5 |
| 4 | (Canada) Debbi Wilkes / Guy Revell | 93.3 | 45 |
| 5 | (Czechoslovakia) Milada Kubíková / Jaroslav Votruba | 95.1 | 52.5 |
| 6 | (Canada) Gertrude Desjardins / Maurice Lafrance | 92.3 | 59.5 |
| 7 | (Switzerland) Gerda Johner / Rüdi Johner | 91.0 | 63.5 |
| 8 | (United States) Dorothyann Nelson / Pieter Kollen | 90.2 | 70.5 |
| 9 | (East Germany) Irene Müller / Hans-Georg Dallmer | 89.0 | 73.5 |
| 10 | (United States) Judianne Fotheringill / Jerry Fotheringill | 87.4 | 73.5 |
| 11 | (United Kingdom) Valerie Hunt / Peter Burrows | | 81.5 |
| 12 | (Austria) Diana Hinko / Bernhard Henhappel | | 107.5 |
| 13 | (Japan) Mieko Ōiwa / Yutaka Dōke | | 113 |
| WD | (West Germany) Marika Kilius / Hans-Jürgen Bäumler | | DNF |

Judges:

- (East Germany) Ernst K. Bauch
- (Switzerland) Jean Creux
- (United Kingdom) Pamela Davis
- (United States) M. Drake
- (Austria) Hans Meixner
- (Canada) Melville Rogers
- (Czechoslovakia) Věra Spurná
- (Soviet Union) Tatyana Tolmachova
- (West Germany) Adolf Walker

=== Ice dance ===
| Rank | Name | Points | Places |
|---|---|---|---|
| 1 | (Czechoslovakia) Eva Romanová / Pavel Roman | 318.5 | 15 |
| 2 | (France) Christiane Guhel / Jean Guhel | 315.8 | 26 |
| 3 | (Canada) Virginia Thompson / William McLachlan | 316.8 | 23 |
| 4 | (United Kingdom) Linda Shearman / Michael Phillips | 310.2 | 42 |
| 5 | (Canada) Paulette Doan / Kenneth Ormsby | 311.0 | 45 |
| 6 | (Canada) Donna Mitchell / John Mitchell | 306.4 | 55.5 |
| 7 | (United States) Dorothyann Nelson / Pieter Kollen | 306.6 | 57 |
| 8 | (United States) Yvonne Littlefield / Peter Betts | 303.0 | 64.5 |
| 9 | (United Kingdom) Mary Parry / Roy Mason | 297.2 | 77 |
| 10 | (Hungary) Györgyi Korda / Pál Vásárhelyi | 281.3 | 99 |
| 11 | (West Germany) Helga Burkhardt / Hannes Burkhardt | | 108 |
| 12 | (Italy) Olga Gilardi / Germano Ceccattini | | 114 |
| 13 | (Switzerland) Marlyse Fornachon / Charly Pichard | | 116 |
| 14 | (France) Armelle Flichy / Pierre Brun | | 119 |
| 15 | (Austria) Christel Trebesiner / Georg Felsinger | | 131 |
| 16 | (West Germany) Gabriele Rauch / Rudi Matysik | | 142 |
| 17 | (Japan) Keiko Kaneko / Mikio Takeuchi | | 143 |

Judges:

- (United Kingdom) Pamela Davis
- (United States) M. Drake
- (Canada) Norman V. S. Gregory
- (Hungary) Ferenc Kertész
- (Switzerland) Eugen Kirchhofer
- (France) L. Lauret
- (Austria) Hans Meixner
- (Czechoslovakia) Emil Skákala
- (West Germany) Hermann Wollersen
