= Ingrid Wendl =

Austrian figure skater (born 1940)

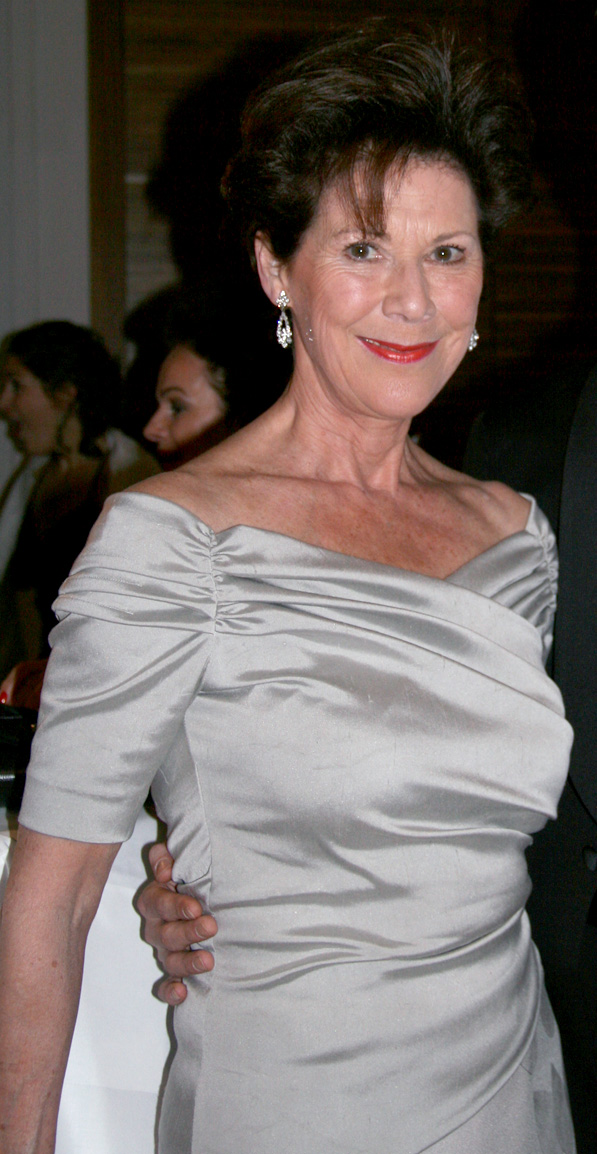
- Ingrid Wendl in 2010

Personal information
- Born: 17 May 1940 (age 86) Vienna

Figure skating career
- Country: Austria
- Retired: 1971
Medal record
Representing Austria
Figure skating: Ladies' singles
Olympic Games
| Bronze medal – third place | 1956 Cortina d'Ampezzo | Ladies' singles |
World Championships
| Silver medal – second place | 1958 Paris | Ladies' singles |
| Bronze medal – third place | 1957 Colorado Springs | Ladies' singles |
| Bronze medal – third place | 1956 Garmisch-Partenkirchen | Ladies' singles |
European Championships
| Gold medal – first place | 1958 Bratislava | Ladies' singles |
| Silver medal – second place | 1957 Vienna | Ladies' singles |
| Gold medal – first place | 1956 Paris | Ladies' singles |

Ingrid Turković-Wendl (née Wendl; born 17 May 1940 in Vienna) is an Austrian retired figure skater, television announcer, and political figure. She has been an Austrian People's Party delegate to the National Council of Austria since 2002.

Turković-Wendl is a two-time European champion (1956, 1958), the 1956 Olympic bronze medalist in ladies' figure skating, and one of the youngest figure skating Olympic medalists. Among her contemporaries were fellow Austrians Hanna Eigel and Hanna Walter. Wendl later became a professional skater and performed in the Viennese Ice Revue (Vienna Ice Revue) and Ice Capades. She retired from the sport in 1971.

In 1972 she began working for ORF, the national Austrian public service broadcaster. She retired from broadcasting in 2000. Turković-Wendl was elected to the National Council of Austria in November 2002.

She is married to bassoonist Milan Turković.

== Results ==
International
| Event | 1953 | 1954 | 1955 | 1956 | 1957 | 1958 |
|---|---|---|---|---|---|---|
| Winter Olympics | | | | 3rd | | |
| World Championships | | 12th | 4th | 3rd | 3rd | 2nd |
| European Championships | | 5th | | 1st | 2nd | 1st |
National
| Austrian Championships | 2nd | 3rd | 1st | 1st | 2nd | 1st |
