= Igor Persiantsev =

Russian figure skater

Personal information
- Native name: Игорь Георгиевич Персианцев
- Full name: Igor Georgiyevich Persiantsev
- Born: 16 February 1937 Moscow, Soviet Union
- Died: 23 December 2015 (aged 78)

Figure skating career
- Country: Soviet Union
- Coach: Elena Vasilieva, Konstantin Likharev
- Skating club: Dynamo Sports Club; DYUSSH Sokolniki
- Began skating: 1949
- Retired: 1960

Igor Georgiyevich Persiantsev (Russian: Игорь Георгиевич Персианцев; 16 February 1937 – 23 December 2015) was a Russian figure skater who represented the Soviet Union. He was the 1955 Soviet national champion and a member of the first Soviet teams to the European and World Figure Skating Championships.

== Life and career ==
Persiantsev began skating in 1949 at DYUSSH Sokolniki. In 1954, he stepped onto the Soviet national podium for the first time, taking the bronze medal.

In 1955, Persiantsev won the national title ahead of Oleg Simantovsky and Lev Mikhailov. The following season, he was a member of the first Soviet team to compete at a European Figure Skating Championship – the 1956 Europeans in Paris – and had the highest placement, 12th, of the three Soviets in men's singles. He would go on to compete at the next three editions of the event, finishing 13th in 1957 (Vienna, Austria), 16th in 1958 (Bratislava, Czechoslovakia), and 14th in 1959 (Davos, Switzerland).

Persiantsev was also part of the first Soviet team to the World Figure Skating Championships, appearing at the 1958 Worlds in Paris, where he finished 21st. He was coached by Elena V. Vasilieva and Konstantin K. Likharev at Dynamo Sports Club in Moscow.

Persiantsev died on 23 December 2015.

== Competitive highlights ==
International
Event	1954	1955	1956	1957	1958	1959	1960
World Champ.					21st		
European Champ.			12th	13th	16th	14th	
National
Soviet Champ.	3rd	1st	3rd		2nd	2nd	3rd
