= Erich Zeller =

German figure skater and coach

Erich Zeller (13 January 1920 in Augsburg, Bavaria, Germany – 6 November 2001 in Garmisch-Partenkirchen, Bavaria, Germany) was a German figure skater and figure skating coach.

Erich Zeller as a skater represented the club Rot-Weiß-Berlin and became 1942 German champion. He studied mechanical engineering. In 1942 he was forced to enter the Wehrmacht. His figure skating career was destroyed by World War II.

In 1945 Erich Zeller participated in ice shows.

In 1956 his coaching career began. His first pupil was Hans-Jürgen Bäumler. Erich Zeller became the most successful coach in West Germany. Among his other students were Marika Kilius, Dagmar Lurz and Norbert Schramm. From 1970 to 1985 he was national coach of West Germany for figure skating (Eiskunstlauf-Bundestrainer). He also was once president of the world coach association.

Erich Zeller wrote figure skating books:

- Meine kleine Eiskunstlaufschule (My Little Figure-Skating-School), published 1969
- Eiskunstlauf für Fortgeschrittene (Figure Skating For Advanced Skaters), published 1982

== Competitive highlights ==
=== Single skating ===
| Event | 1941 | 1942 |
|---|---|---|
| German Championships | 5th | 1st |
