= Jindra Kramperová =

Czech figure skater and pianist (1940–2024)

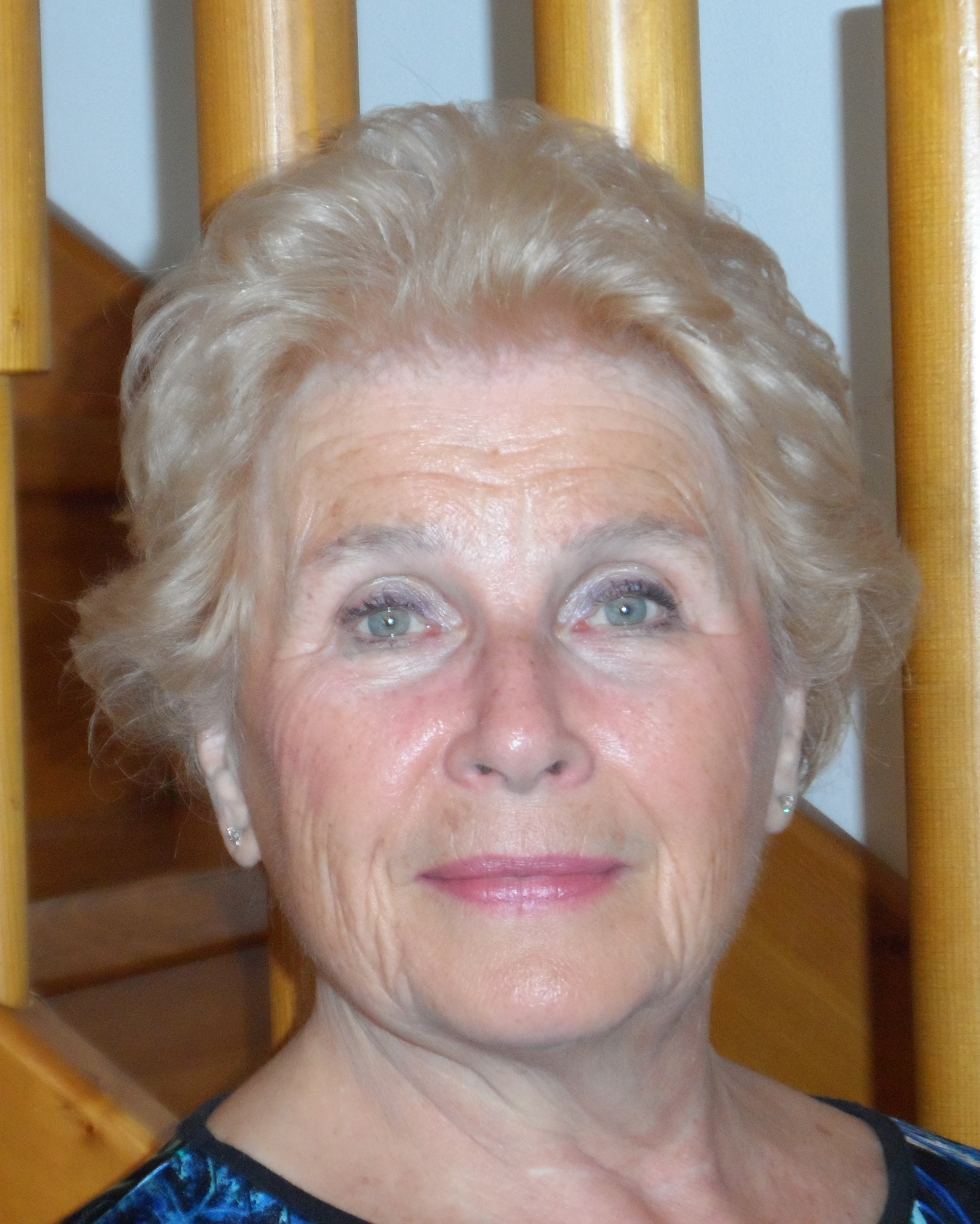
- Kramperová in 2015

Personal information
- Born: Jindřiška Kramperová; 28 September 1940 Prague, Protectorate of Bohemia and Moravia
- Died: 20 October 2024 (aged 84)

Figure skating career
- Country: Czechoslovakia
- Coach: Miroslav Hasenöhrl, Karel Glogar
- Retired: c. 1960

Jindřiška "Jindra" Kramperová (28 September 1940 – 20 October 2024) was a Czech figure skater and pianist. A three-time national champion in ladies' singles, she represented Czechoslovakia at the 1956 Winter Olympics and she was fifth at the European Championships (1958).

== Background ==
Kramperová was born on 28 September 1940 in Prague. Her mother was a teacher and her father a dentist.

She was married to a conductor, Vít Micka. Kramperová died on 20 October 2024, at the age of 84.

== Career ==
=== Figure skating ===
Kramperová's father introduced her to skating when she was six years old. He hoped that a physical activity and fresh air would improve her poor health so he brought her to an outdoor ice rink in Štvanice – Prague's only rink at the time. Karel Glogar saw potential in Kramperová and became her coach. She joined Miroslav Hasenöhrl two years later and would go on to train under several other coaches. During summers, she traveled to Stará Boleslav, which had a small arena with artificial ice, or to Dobšiná Ice Cave in Slovakia.

As a thirteen-year-old, Kramperová played a girl trying to balance her interests in music and figure skating in Na stříbrném zrcadle, a film written by František Kožík and directed by Jaromír Pleskot. At the age of 15, she finished 14th at the 1956 European Championships in Paris, France. She then represented Czechoslovakia at the 1956 Winter Olympics in Cortina d'Ampezzo, Italy; she ranked 21st in compulsory figures, 17th in free skating, and 20th overall. Concluding her season, she placed 15th at the 1956 World Championships in Garmisch-Partenkirchen, West Germany.

Kramperová won three consecutive national titles from 1957 to 1959. She finished 8th at the 1957 Europeans in Vienna, Austria; 5th at the 1958 Europeans in Bratislava, Czechoslovakia; 17th at the 1958 Worlds in Paris; 6th at the 1959 Europeans in Davos, Switzerland; and 8th at the 1960 Europeans in Garmisch-Partenkirchen.

After retiring from competition, Kramperová appeared in an ice revue.

=== Music career ===
Kramperová began playing the piano as a nine-year-old, instructed by Ema Doležalová. After a solo recital at the Prague Municipal Library at age twelve, she performed with the FOK Symphonic Orchestra when she was thirteen.

Kramperová was taught by František Maxián at a music school in Bratislava from 1960 to 1965. She then studied at the Academy of Performing Arts in Prague (AMU) and completed two years of post-graduate studies under Nina Yemelyanova at a conservatory in Moscow.

In 1971, she began teaching at AMU. From 1974 to 1988 she was a soloist at the Chamber Philharmonic Orchestra in Pardubice.

== Competitive highlights ==
International
Event	55–56	56–57	57–58	58–59	59–60	60-61
Winter Olympics	20th					
World Championships	15th		17th			
European Championships	14th	8th	5th	6th	8th	
National
Czechoslovak Champ.	2nd	1st	1st	1st	3rd	2nd
