= István Szenes =

Hungarian figure skater

Personal information
- Born: Hungary

Figure skating career
- Country: Hungary
- Retired: c. 1956

István Szenes was a Hungarian former figure skater who won three Hungarian national titles in the 1950s. He placed sixth at the 1955 European Championships in Budapest, 11th at the 1955 World Championships in Vienna, and eighth at the 1956 European Championships in Paris. He married German figure skater Ina Bauer.

== Competitive highlights ==
International
Event	1953	1954	1955	1956
World Championships			11th	
European Championships			6th	8th
National
Hungarian Championships	1st		1st	1st
