= Pamela Weight =

English figure skater

Personal information
- Other names: Stretton
- Born: London
- Home town: Solihull

Figure skating career
- Country: United Kingdom
- Partner: Paul Thomas
- Retired: 1956
Medal record
Figure skating
Ice dancing
Representing United Kingdom
Gold medal – first place	1956 Garmisch-Partenkirchen	Ice dancing
Silver medal – second place	1955 Vienna	Ice dancing
European Championships
Gold medal – first place	1956 Paris	Ice dancing
Silver medal – second place	1955 Budapest	Ice dancing

Pamela Weight is an English retired ice dancer. With partner Paul Thomas, she is the 1956 World champion and European champion. Weight retired from the sport immediately after the 1956 victories in order to marry and start a family.

== Results ==
(with Paul Thomas)

Event	1955	1956
World Championships	2nd	1st
European Championships	2nd	1st
British Championships		1st
