= Valentin Zakharov =

Soviet figure skater (1933–2026)

Personal information
- Native name: Валентин Дмитриевич Захаров
- Full name: Valentin Dmitriyevich Zakharov
- Born: 9 April 1933 Leningrad, Russian SFSR, USSR
- Died: 1 January 2026 (aged 92)

Figure skating career
- Country: Soviet Union
- Retired: c. 1958

Valentin Dmitriyevich Zakharov (Russian: Валентин Дмитриевич Захаров; 9 April 1933 – 1 January 2026) was a Soviet figure skater. He was a two-time Soviet national champion.

== Biography ==
Zakharov was born on 9 April 1933. In 1956, Zakharov was included in the Soviet Union's first-ever team to the European Championships. He placed 16th at the 1956 Europeans in Paris, 11th at the 1957 Europeans in Vienna, and 11th at the 1958 Europeans in Bratislava. In 1958, he competed at the World Championships in Paris – the Soviet Union's debut at the event. He finished 20th. Zakharov died on 1 January 2026, at the age of 92.

== Competitive highlights ==
International
Event	1953	1954	1955	1956	1957	1958
World Champ.						20th
European Champ.				16th	11th	11th
National
Soviet Champ.	1st	1st	3rd	4th	2nd	3rd
