= June Markham =

British ice dancer

Personal information
- Full name: June Margaret Markham
- Born: Beamish, County Durham

Figure skating career
- Country: United Kingdom
- Partner: Courtney Jones
- Coach: Gladys Hogg
- Skating club: Queens Ice Club
Medal record
Figure skating
Ice dancing
Representing United Kingdom
World Championships
| Gold medal – first place | 1958 Paris | Ice dancing |
| Gold medal – first place | 1957 Colorado Springs | Ice dancing |
| Silver medal – second place | 1956 Garmisch-Partenkirchen | Ice dancing |
European Championships
| Gold medal – first place | 1958 Bratislava | Ice dancing |
| Gold medal – first place | 1957 Vienna | Ice dancing |
| Silver medal – second place | 1956 Paris | Ice dancing |

June Markham is a British ice dancer. With partner Courtney Jones, she is the 1957 & 1958 World champion and European champion.

== Results ==
(with Courtney Jones)

| Event | 1956 | 1957 | 1958 |
|---|---|---|---|
| World Championships | 2nd | 1st | 1st |
| European Championships | 2nd | 1st | 1st |
| British Championships | | 1st | 1st |
