= Ina Bauer (figure skater) =

German figure skater (1941–2014)

Personal information
- Other names: Ina Szenes-Bauer
- Born: 31 January 1941 Krefeld, Germany
- Died: 13 December 2014 (aged 73)

Figure skating career
- Country: West Germany
- Retired: 1960

Ina Szenes-Bauer (née Bauer; 31 January 1941 – 13 December 2014) was a German competitive figure skater. She won three consecutive West German national titles (1957–59) and invented the skating element which bears her name.

== Personal life ==
Ina Bauer was born in Krefeld on 31 January 1941. Her father was a silk manufacturer. She married a Hungarian figure skater, István Szenes.

Szenes-Bauer died 13 December 2014.

== Career ==
After winning the German national silver medal in 1956, Bauer was assigned to the European Championships in Paris, France and finished 13th. She then placed 20th at the World Championships in Garmisch-Partenkirchen, Germany.

The following season, Bauer won the first of her three German national titles. She placed tenth at the 1957 European Championships in Vienna, Austria and 11th at the 1957 World Championships in Colorado Springs, Colorado.

During the next two years, Bauer repeated as German national champion and achieved her highest international rankings. She placed fourth at the 1958 World Championships in Paris, France, the 1959 European Championships in Davos, Switzerland, and the 1959 World Championships in Colorado Springs, Colorado. During this time, she trained in Colorado Springs.

After withdrawing from the 1960 European Championships in Garmisch-Partenkirchen after the compulsory figures portion of the competition, Bauer retired from competition at her father's request. She then toured with Ice Follies and starred in two movies with Austrian alpine skier Toni Sailer.

Bauer invented the eponymous skating element.

== Results ==
Event	1956	1957	1958	1959	1960
World Champ.	20th	11th	4th	4th	
European Champ.	13th	10th		4th	WD
West German Champ.	2nd	1st	1st	1st	
WD: Withdrew
