= Rodney Ward (figure skater) =

British figure skater

Personal information
- Nationality: British
- Born: 12 February 1941; Nottingham, England
- Died: 29 November 2022 (aged 81); Winnipeg, Manitoba, Canada

Sport
- Sport: Figure skating

Rodney Ward (12 February 1941 – 29 November 2022) was a British figure skater. He competed in the pairs event at the 1956 Winter Olympics. In the 1955–56 season, Rodney Ward (14), along with his partner Carolyn Krau (12), won the national junior pairs' title and finished second on the senior level at the British Championships. After placing 9th at the 1956 European Championships in Paris, they competed at the 1956 Winter Olympics in Cortina d'Ampezzo, where they finished 11th and remain the youngest skaters to ever compete in the pairs event at the Winter Olympics. They placed 9th at their final event of the season, the 1956 World Championships in Garmisch-Partenkirchen.

Ward/Krau ranked 13th at the 1958 European Championships in Bratislava and 12th at the 1958 World Championships in Paris.

International
Event	1955–56	1957–58
Winter Olympics	11th	
World Championships	9th	12th
European Championships	9th	13th
National
British Championships	2nd	
British Junior Champ.	1st	
