= Courtney Jones (figure skater) =

British ice dancer (born 1933)

Courtney Jones OBE
Personal information
- Full name: Courtney John Lyndhurst Jones
- Born: 30 April 1933 (age 93)

Figure skating career
- Country: Great Britain
Medal record
Figure skating
Ice dancing
Representing United Kingdom
World Championships
Gold medal – first place	1960 Vancouver	Ice dancing
Gold medal – first place	1959 Colorado Springs	Ice dancing
Gold medal – first place	1958 Paris	Ice dancing
Gold medal – first place	1957 Colorado Springs	Ice dancing
Silver medal – second place	1956 Garmisch-Partenkirchen	Ice dancing
European Championships
Gold medal – first place	1961 West Berlin	Ice dancing
Gold medal – first place	1960 Garmisch-Partenkirchen	Ice dancing
Gold medal – first place	1959 Davos	Ice dancing
Gold medal – first place	1958 Bratislava	Ice dancing
Gold medal – first place	1957 Vienna	Ice dancing
Silver medal – second place	1956 Paris	Ice dancing

Courtney John Lyndhurst Jones (born 30 April 1933) is a British former ice dancer. With partner June Markham, he won the 1957 and 1958 world championship and European championship. With partner Doreen Denny, he became 1959 and 1960 world champion and 1959–1961 European champion.

Jones and Peri Horne created the pattern steps of the Starlight Waltz and the Silver Samba, formerly compulsory dances but rarely used in modern times.

An Olympic judge, Jones was a member of the International Skating Union Council. He is also a former president of the National Ice Skating Association. Jones was inducted into the World Figure Skating Hall of Fame in 1986.

He was appointed an Officer of the Order of the British Empire (OBE) in the 1980 Birthday Honours for services to ice skating.

== Results ==
(with June Markham)

Event	1956	1957	1958
World Championships	2nd	1st	1st
European Championships	2nd	1st	1st
British Championships		1st	1st

(with Doreen Denny)

Event	1959	1960	1961
World Championships	1st	1st	
European Championships	1st	1st	1st
British Championships	1st	1st	1st
