= Irina Liuliakova =

Soviet figure skater

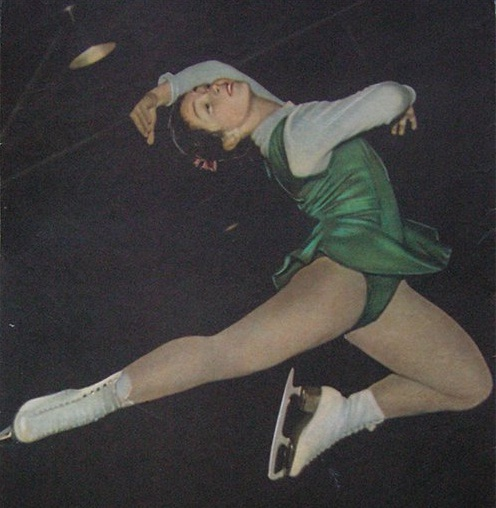
- Lulyakova irina.

Personal information
- Born: 3 February 1945 (age 81)

Figure skating career
- Country: Russia

Irina Liuliakova (Russian: Ирина Васильевна Люлякова, Irina Vasil'yevna Lyulyakova) (born 3 February 1945) is a Soviet figure skater. She represented the Soviet Union at the 1959 European Figure Skating Championships, placing 27th.

== Biography ==
She started training in figure skating in 1952 at the Young Pioneers Stadium in Moscow.

== Competitive highlights ==
Event	1958/59
European Figure Skating Championships	27th
