= Zdeněk Doležal =

Czechoslovak figure skater

Personal information
- Born: 1 September 1931 Prague, Czechoslovakia

Figure skating career
- Country: Czechoslovakia
- Partner: Věra Suchánková
- Retired: 1958
Medal record
Figure skating: Pairs
Representing Czechoslovakia
World Championships
Silver medal – second place	1958 Paris	Pairs
European Championships
Gold medal – first place	1958 Bratislava	Pairs
Gold medal – first place	1957 Vienna	Pairs
Silver medal – second place	1955 Budapest	Pairs

Zdeněk Doležal (born 1 September 1931) is a Czech former pair skater who competed internationally for Czechoslovakia. With his skating partner, Věra Suchánková, he is the 1958 World silver medalist and a two-time European champion (1957, 1958). They represented Czechoslovakia at the 1956 Winter Olympics and placed 8th.

Doležal was born on 1 September 1931 in Prague. His sports club was Rapid Pardubice. In 2016, Pardubice named him as one of the athletes to be included in the city's planned sports hall of fame.

== Results ==
(with Věra Suchánková)

International
Event	1951	1952	1954	1955	1956	1957	1958
Winter Olympics					8th		
World Championships				6th			2nd
European Championships				2nd	5th	1st	1st
National
Czechoslovak Champ.	2nd	3rd	3rd		1st	1st	1st
