= Věra Suchánková =

Czechoslovak figure skater (1932–2004)

Personal information
- Other names: Věra Suchánková-Hamplová
- Born: 29 October 1932 Pardubice, Czechoslovakia
- Died: 12 February 2004 (aged 71) Pila, Karlovy Vary District, Czech Republic

Figure skating career
- Country: Czechoslovakia
- Partner: Zdeněk Doležal
- Skating club: Rapid Pardubice
- Retired: 1958
Medal record
Representing Czechoslovakia
Figure skating: Pairs
World Championships
Silver medal – second place	1958 Paris	Pairs
European Championships
Gold medal – first place	1958 Bratislava	Pairs
Gold medal – first place	1957 Vienna	Pairs
Silver medal – second place	1955 Budapest	Pairs

Věra Suchánková-Hamplová (29 October 1932 – 12 February 2004) was a Czech pair skater who competed internationally for Czechoslovakia. With her skating partner, Zdeněk Doležal, she was the 1958 World silver medalist and a two-time European champion (1957, 1958). They represented Czechoslovakia at the 1956 Winter Olympics and placed 8th.

Suchánková was born on 29 October 1932 in Pardubice. Her sports club was Rapid Pardubice. She also played tennis, winning a national junior-level tournament in 1951. After retiring from competition, she worked as a skating coach in Karlovy Vary. She died on 12 February 2004 in Pila, Karlovy Vary District. In 2016, Pardubice named Suchánková as one of the athletes to be included in the city's planned sports hall of fame.

== Results ==
(with Zdeněk Doležal)

International
Event	1951	1952	1954	1955	1956	1957	1958
Winter Olympics					8th		
World Championships				6th			2nd
European Championships				2nd	5th	1st	1st
National
Czechoslovak Champ.	2nd	3rd	3rd		1st	1st	1st
