= Axel lift =

Movement in pair skating

An Axel lift in pair skating is a movement where the woman is lifted and turned over her partner's head one and a half times. The lift begins from a position of holding hands on one side. Her partner lifts her with his hand under her armpit, starting from the woman's outside forward edge and ending on the outside backward edge of her opposite skate. During this movement, the man rotates underneath her.
