= Michael Robinson (figure skater) =

British figure skater

Personal information
- Home town: Nottingham, England

Figure skating career
- Country: Great Britain
Medal record
Representing Great Britain
Figure skating: Ice dance
European Championships
Silver medal – second place	1958 Bratislava	Ice dance
Silver medal – second place	1959 Davos	Ice dance
Bronze medal – third place	1957 Vienna	Ice dance

Michael Robinson is a British figure skater who competed in ice dance.

With partner Catherine Morris, he won bronze at the 1957 European Figure Skating Championships and silver at the 1958 and 1959 European Figure Skating Championships.

== Competitive highlights ==
With Catherine Morris

Event	1957	1958	1959
European Championships	3rd	2nd	2nd
