= Tilo Gutzeit =

German figure skater

Personal information
- Full name: Tilo Gutzeit
- Born: 27 January 1938 (age 88)

Figure skating career
- Country: West Germany; Germany
- Skating club: Düsseldorfer EG

Tilo Gutzeit (born 27 January 1938) is a German figure skater who represented West Germany in competition. He is the 1955 German national champion. He represented the United Team of Germany at the 1956 Winter Olympics, where he placed 10th, and at the 1960 Winter Olympics, where he placed 9th. He represented the club Düsseldorfer EG in national level competition.

Originally the results of the 1955 German Championships were miscalculated. Due to this Tilo Gutzeit received only the silver medal there and 12-year-old Manfred Schnelldorfer was announced as German Champion. Several months after these championships, Werner Rittberger, who was a judge at these championships, recalculated the results. The results were corrected and the medals were physically exchanged.

Tilo Gutzeit was also a potential skating partner for pair skater Marika Kilius. She had to split from Franz Ningel due to her height. However, Marika Kilius decided for Hans-Jürgen Bäumler.

== Competitive highlights ==
Event/Season	1955	1956	1957	1958	1959	1960
Olympic Games		10				9
World Championships	13	9		7	6	5
European Championships	7	5		6	6	5
German Championships	1	2		2	2	2
