= Per Kjølberg =

Norwegian figure skater

Personal information
- Born: 1941
- Died: 2017 (aged 75–76)
- Home town: Oslo

Figure skating career
- Country: Norway
- Skating club: Oslo IL
- Retired: 1962

Per Kjølberg (1941–2017) was a Norwegian competitive figure skater. He was a six-time Nordic champion and a seven-time Norwegian national champion. He placed ninth both at the 1960 European Championships and at the 1962 European Championships.

In the autumn of 1962 he signed a 2-year contract with Ice Capades, which already had signed a contract with his former pair partner Grete Borgen the year before.

In the 1970s he emigrated to North America to work as a figure skating coach in Canada.

== Competitive highlights ==
Single

International
Event	1956	1957	1958	1959	1960	1961	1962
World Champ.			19th			N/A	15th
European Champ.					9th	10th	9th
Nordics	2nd	1st	1st	1st	1st	1st	1st
National
Norwegian Champ.	1st	1st	1st	1st	1st	1st	1st

Pairs

- with Grete Borgen

International
Event	1959	1960
Nordics	1st	1st
National
Norwegian Champ.	2nd	1st
