= Patricia Pauley =

British figure skater

Personal information
- Full name: Patricia Ann Pauley
- Born: 27 August 1943 (age 82) London, England
- Home town: Kingston upon Thames

Figure skating career
- Country: United Kingdom
- Retired: 1960

Patricia Ann Pauley (born 27 August 1943) is a British former figure skater who competed in ladies' singles. She is a two-time British national champion (1959, 1960) and competed at the 1960 Winter Olympics, placing 15th. She came in seventh at the 1958 and 1960 World Championships.

== Life and career ==
Born in London to Edward George Claude Pauley and Ludawicka Spiess from Vienna, Austria, Patricia now resides in London with her husband Gordon Foster and children. Patricia turned professional and skated around the world with Holiday on Ice.

== Results ==
International
Event	1954–55	1955–56	1956–57	1957–58	1958–59	1959–60
Winter Olympics						15th
World Champ.				7th		
European Champ.			7th			7th
Richmond Trophy	1st			3rd		
National
British Champ.					1st	1st
