= Maryvonne Huet =

French figure skater

Maryvonne Huet (born 1 December 1936) is a former French figure skater who competed in ladies singles. She won the gold medal at the French Figure Skating Championships in 1954 and again in 1955. She finished sixth at the 1955 European Figure Skating Championships and 19th at that year's World Figure Skating Championships. She represented her country in the 1956 Winter Olympics, placing 17th. In 1957, she captured another French Championship and came in 17th at the European Championships.

== Results ==
Event	1954	1955	1956	1957
Winter Olympics			17th	
World Championships		19th		
European Championships		6th		17th
French Championships	1st	1st		1st
