= Gerard Rigby =

Figure skating career
- Country: Great Britain
Medal record
Representing Great Britain
Figure skating: Ice dancing
World Championships
Bronze medal – third place	1956 Garmisch- Partenkirchen	Ice dancing
European Championships
Silver medal – second place	1957 Vienna	Ice dancing
Bronze medal – third place	1956 Paris	Ice dancing
Bronze medal – third place	1958 Bratislava	Ice dancing

Gerard Rigby is a British figure skater who competed in ice dance.

With partner Barbara Thompson, he won the bronze medal at the 1956 World Figure Skating Championships.

== Competitive highlights ==
With Barbara Thompson

Event	1956	1957	1958
World Championships	3rd	5th	5th
European Championships	3rd	2nd	3rd
