= Barbara Thompson (figure skater) =

British figure skater

Figure skating career
- Country: Great Britain
Medal record
Representing Great Britain
Figure skating: Ice dancing
World Championships
| Bronze medal – third place | 1956 Garmisch- Partenkirchen | Ice dancing |
European Championships
| Silver medal – second place | 1957 Vienna | Ice dancing |
| Bronze medal – third place | 1956 Paris | Ice dancing |
| Bronze medal – third place | 1958 Bratislava | Ice dancing |

Barbara Thompson is a British figure skater who competed in ice dance.

With partner Gerard Rigby, she won the bronze medal at the 1956 World Figure Skating Championships.

== Competitive highlights ==
With Gerard Rigby

| Event | 1956 | 1957 | 1958 |
|---|---|---|---|
| World Championships | 3rd | 5th | 5th |
| European Championships | 3rd | 2nd | 3rd |
