= Bill Cherrell =

Australian figure skater

Personal information
- Full name: William Claude Cherrell
- Nationality: Australian
- Born: 12 February 1938 (age 88) Melbourne, Australia

Sport
- Sport: Figure skating
Medal record
Commonwealth Winter Games
Gold medal – first place	1958 St Moritz	Figure skating - men's singles

William Claude Cherrell (born 12 February 1938) is an Australian figure skater. He competed in the men's singles event at the 1960 Winter Olympics.
