= Karol Divín =

Czechoslovak figure skater (1936–2022)

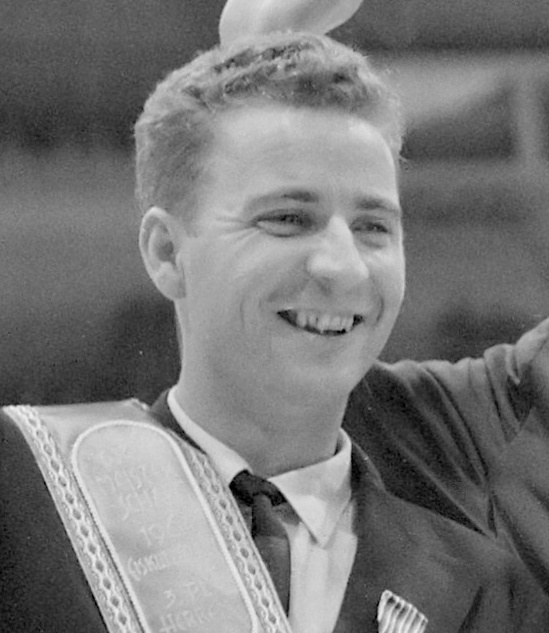
- Divín in 1964

Personal information
- Full name: Karol Emil Divín
- Other names: Finster
- Born: 22 February 1936 Budapest, Hungary
- Died: 6 April 2022 (aged 86)

Figure skating career
- Country: Czechoslovakia
- Retired: 1964
Medal record
Men's figure skating
Representing Czechoslovakia
Olympic Games
Silver medal – second place	1960 Squaw Valley	Men's singles
World Championships
Bronze medal – third place	1964 Dortmund	Men's singles
Silver medal – second place	1962 Prague	Men's singles
European Championships
Bronze medal – third place	1964 Grenoble	Men's singles
Silver medal – second place	1962 Geneva	Men's singles
Gold medal – first place	1959 Davos	Men's singles
Gold medal – first place	1958 Bratislava	Men's singles
Silver medal – second place	1957 Vienna	Men's singles
Bronze medal – third place	1956 Paris	Men's singles
Bronze medal – third place	1955 Budapest	Men's singles
Bronze medal – third place	1954 Bolzano	Men's singles

Karol "Karcsi" Emil Divín (born Karol Finster; 22 February 1936 – 6 April 2022) was a Czechoslovak figure skater of Czech and Hungarian origin. He was the 1960 Olympic silver medalist, a two-time European champion (1958–59), and a two-time World medalist (silver in 1962, bronze in 1964).

== Early life ==
Divín was born 22 February 1936 in Budapest. His mother, Irma, was Czech, his father, Anton Finster, a Hungarian of German descent, and one of his grandmothers a Slovak. After World War II, the family adopted his grandmother's surname, Divín. They moved to Bratislava, Czechoslovakia, in 1946. In early childhood, Divín was interested in soccer and tennis.

== Career ==
Divín was introduced to figure skating by his father, who was also his first coach.

At the 1954 European Championships in Bolzano, Italy, Divín stepped onto a major international podium for the first time, taking the bronze medal. He placed fifth at the 1956 Winter Olympics in Cortina d'Ampezzo, Italy.

Following three consecutive years as the European bronze medalist, he won the silver medal at the 1957 European Championships in Vienna, Austria.

Divín won gold at the 1958 European Championships in Bratislava and defended his European title at the 1959 European Championships in Davos, Switzerland. Ivan Mauer became his coach in 1959.

In preparation for the Olympics, Divín practiced a triple loop but tore a muscle and was forced to withdraw from the 1960 European championships. He was sent to the 1960 Winter Olympics after promising that he would finish the competition. Placing second to American David Jenkins and ahead of Canada's Donald Jackson, he won the silver medal in Squaw Valley, California.

Divín won silver at the 1962 European Championships in Geneva, Switzerland, and at the 1962 World Championships in Prague, Czechoslovakia. He was the bronze medalist at the 1964 European Championships in Grenoble, France, and placed fourth at the 1964 Winter Olympics in Innsbruck, Austria. He retired from competition after winning the bronze medal at the 1964 World Championships in Dortmund, Germany.

After ending his competitive career, Divín began coaching in Finland. He was later for many years based in North Bay, Ontario, Canada. He coached Dough Leigh in the late 1960s and worked with Brian Orser on compulsory figures from 1983 to 1987. In the 2000s, he worked with Michal Březina in Brno.

== Personal life ==
In the 1960s, Divín married Olga Reinišová, a Czech pair skater. They had a son, Peter, who lives in Surrey, British Columbia, Canada, with his wife, Outi, and four children Benjamin, Stephanie, Martina, and Jack. In 1984, Divín married his second wife, Mirka. From this marriage, he has two stepdaughters, Renata, who lives in Brno, and Jana, who lives in Congers, New York, United States. He alternated his residency between Surrey and Brno, Czechia. He died on 6 April 2022.

== Results ==
Event	1950	1951	1952	1953	1954	1955	1956	1957	1958	1959	1960	1961	1962	1963	1964
Winter Olympics							5th				2nd				4th
World Championships						5th	6th		6th	5th			2nd	4th	3rd
European Championships					3rd	3rd	3rd	2nd	1st	1st	WD		2nd		3rd
Czechoslovak Championships	3rd	2nd			1st	1st	1st	1st	1st	1st	1st	1st	1st	1st	1st
