= Liliane Crosa =

Swiss figure skater

Liliane Crosa (born 3 July 1942) is a Swiss former figure skater who competed in ladies singles. She won the gold medal at the Swiss Figure Skating Championships in 1959 and 1960. She finished 20th at the 1960 Winter Olympics.
