= Charles Keeble =

Australian figure skater

Charles Keeble (6 January 1934 – 25 November 2000) was an Australian figure skater who competed at the 1956 Winter Olympics. He scored 123.93 points and finished 16th out of 16 competitors in the men's individual event.
