= Dianne Peach =

British figure skater

Personal information
- Born: Dianne Carol Rosemary Peach; 25 December 1939 (age 86) Birmingham, England

Figure skating career
- Country: Great Britain

Dianne Carol Rosemary Peach (born 25 December 1939) is a British figure skater. She competed in the women's singles event at the 1956 Winter Olympics. She was the 1954 British junior champion and the 1958 senior champion. In 1958, she went professional and joined the Ice Capades.
