= Marika Kilius =

German pair skater (born 1943)

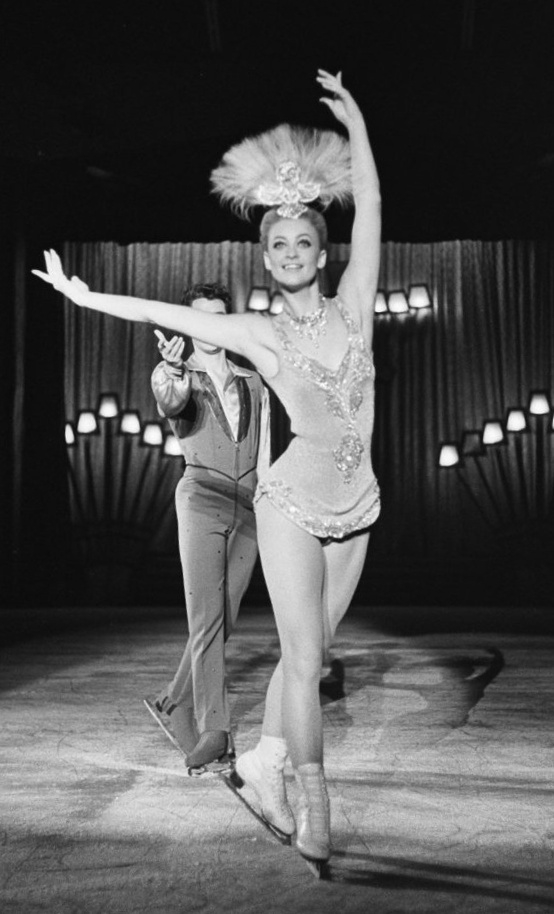
- Kilius in 1964

Personal information
- Born: 24 March 1943 (age 83) Frankfurt am Main, Hessen, Germany

Figure skating career
- Country: West Germany
- Retired: 1964
Medal record
Figure skating: Pairs
Representing Germany
Olympic Games
Silver medal – second place	1964 Innsbruck	Pairs
Silver medal – second place	1960 Squaw Valley	Pairs
Representing West Germany
World Championships
Gold medal – first place	1964 Dortmund	Pairs
Gold medal – first place	1963 Cortina d'Ampezzo	Pairs
Bronze medal – third place	1960 Vancouver	Pairs
Silver medal – second place	1959 Colorado Springs	Pairs
Silver medal – second place	1957 Colorado Springs	Pairs
Bronze medal – third place	1956 Garmisch-Partenkirchen	Pairs
European Championships
Gold medal – first place	1964 Grenoble	Pairs
Gold medal – first place	1963 Budapest	Pairs
Gold medal – first place	1962 Geneva	Pairs
Gold medal – first place	1961 West Berlin	Pairs
Gold medal – first place	1960 Garmisch-Partenkirchen	Pairs
Gold medal – first place	1959 Davos	Pairs
Bronze medal – third place	1957 Vienna	Pairs
Bronze medal – third place	1956 Paris	Pairs
Bronze medal – third place	1955 Budapest	Pairs

Marika Kilius (German pronunciation: [maˈʁiːkaː ˈkiːli̯ʊs]; born 24 March 1943) is a German former pair skater. With Hans-Jürgen Bäumler, she is a two-time Olympic silver medalist, a two-time World champion, and a six-time European champion. Earlier in her career, she competed with Franz Ningel.

== Personal life ==
Marika Kilius, the daughter of a hairdresser, was born on 24 March 1943 in Frankfurt am Main, Hessen. In 1964, she married Werner Zahn, the son of a factory owner from Frankfurt am Main. The couple divorced thirteen years later, and Kilius also divorced her second husband after four years. She has two children, Sascha and Melanie Schäfer, and as of May 2005, two grandchildren.

== Career ==
Kilius began as a singles skater but picked up pairs very early. Her first partner was Franz Ningel. They placed fourth at the 1956 Olympics and won the silver medal at the 1957 World Championships. Kilius was still a child when she was paired with Ningel, who was more than six years her senior. By 1957 she had grown to be taller than her partner, which caused problems on their lifts, so the team split up.

For a time following her split with Ningel, Kilius competed in artistic roller skating as a singles skater. She was the World Roller ladies' champion in 1958.

Afterward, Kilius began skating with Hans-Jürgen Bäumler under the tutelage of Erich Zeller. They won the German Championships after being paired together for only six weeks. Between 1958 and 1964, they won the German Championships four times, European Championships six times and the World Championships two times. Their first World title, in 1963, followed the cancellation of the 1961 event due to the crash of Sabena Flight 548 and a collision during their performance at the 1962 World Figure Skating Championships that forced them to withdraw because part of Kilius's skate broke off.

Kilius and Bäumler also captured the silver medal at the Olympics twice, in 1960 and 1964. Their silver medal at the 1964 Olympics caused controversy at the time, as many of the spectators were German and felt that the pair were marked unfairly low, though they had not skated as well as usual at either that competition or the preceding 1964 German Championships. Threatening letters were sent to the event officials, with Suzanne Morrow Francis a particular target due to the low marks she gave the couple, although they were in line with other scores she gave during the competition.

After their loss at the Olympics, the pair considered not competing at the 1964 World Championships, but they were persuaded to do so by Kilius's friend Thomas Fritsch. They created a new free skate for the competition; for the middle part, they copied the program of the Olympic gold medalists, Ludmila Belousova and Oleg Protopopov. The pair won the competition and retired from competitive skating to turn professional.

Both skaters had signed professional contracts and skated as professionals with Holiday on Ice before the 1964 Olympics, a violation of their amateur status and strict IOC rules. In 1966, because the team had signed a professional skating contract before the 1964 Winter Olympics – against the rules at the time – they were stripped of the medal. As the New York Times reported, "prodded by two German members, the IOC "quietly re-awarded the West Germans their silver medals in 1987, 23 years after the Innsbruck Games, at an executive board meeting in Istanbul. The couple was deemed 'rehabilitated.'"

Kilius was voted the German female athlete of the year in 1959.

== Results ==
=== Pairs with Franz Ningel ===
Event	1954	1955	1956	1957
Winter Olympics			4th	
World Championships		7th	3rd	2nd
European Championships		3rd	3rd	3rd
German Championships	2nd	1st	1st	1st

=== Pairs with Hans-Jürgen Bäumler ===
Event	1958	1959	1960	1961	1962	1963	1964
Winter Olympics			2nd				2nd
World Championships	6th	2nd	3rd			1st	1st
European Championships	5th	1st	1st	1st	1st	1st	1st
German Championships	1st	1st	2nd	2nd	2nd	1st	1st

Awards
Preceded by (Germany) Marianne Werner	German Sportswoman of the Year; 1959	Succeeded by (Germany) Ingrid Krämer
