= Michael Booker (figure skater) =

British figure skater (born 1937)

Personal information
- Full name: Michael Robert Booker
- Born: 16 April 1937 (age 89) Islington, England

Figure skating career
- Country: United Kingdom
- Retired: 1958
Medal record
Representing the United Kingdom
Figure skating: Men's singles
European Championships
Bronze medal – third place	1957 Vienna	Men's singles
Silver medal – second place	1956 Paris	Men's singles
Silver medal – second place	1955 Budapest	Men's singles

Michael Robert Booker (born 16 April 1937) is a British former figure skater who competed in men's singles. He is a three-time European medalist (silver in 1955 and 1956, bronze in 1957) and a six-time British national champion. Booker placed sixth at the 1956 Winter Olympics and fifth at the 1956 World Championships.

== Results ==
International
Event	1953	1954	1955	1956	1957	1958
Winter Olympics				6th		
World Championships	9th	6th	6th	5th	10th	8th
European Championships	4th	4th	2nd	2nd	3rd	4th
National
British Championships	1st	1st	1st	1st	1st	1st
