= Jitka Hlaváčková =

Figure skater

Personal information
- Spouse: Václav Šimon

Figure skating career
- Country: Czechoslovakia
- Skating club: Slavia Žižkov
- Retired: 1962

Jitka Hlaváčková, whose married name is Jitka Šimonová, is a former competitive figure skater who represented Czechoslovakia. She is the 1960 Winter Universiade champion and 1962 silver medalist. She represented her country at five European Championships, placing as high as tenth (1961).

After ending her competitive career she became a medical doctor.

== Competitive highlights ==
International
Event	1957	1958	1959	1960	1961	1962
European Champ.	12th	12th	12th	13th	10th	
Winter Universiade				1st		2nd
National
Czechoslovak Champ.	2nd	3rd	3rd	2nd		3rd
