= Anna Galmarini =

Italian figure skater

Personal information
- Full name: Anna Galmarini Mayeur
- Born: 15 October 1942 Milan, Italy
- Died: 28 January 1997 (aged 54) Ashland
- Height: 1.45 m (4 ft 9 in)

Figure skating career
- Country: Italy
- Coach: Erich Zeller
- Retired: 1960

Anna Galmarini Mayeur (15 October 1942 – 28 January 1997) was an Italian figure skater. She finished eighth at the 1960 Winter Olympics in Squaw Valley, California. She was coached by Erich Zeller.

After retiring from competition, Galmarini performed with Ice Capades in the United States and worked as a coach. She married Jules Mayeur, Head Carpenter with the show.

== Competitive highlights ==
International
Event	1957	1958	1959	1960
Winter Olympics				8th
World Championships		21st	9th	10th
European Championships	19th	10th	11th	6th
National
Italian Championships	1st	1st	1st	1st
