= Hanna Walter =

Austrian figure skater

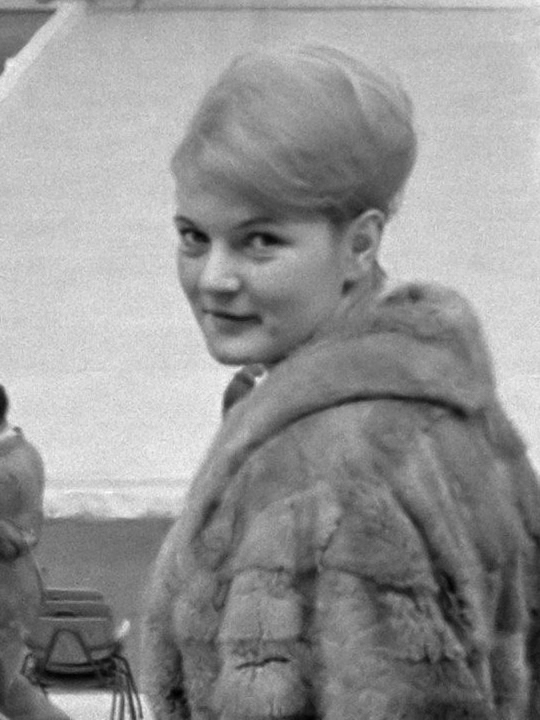
- Hanna Walter (1961)

Personal information
- Full name: Hanna Walter
- Born: November 24, 1939 (age 86)

Figure skating career
- Country: Austria
- Skating club: WEV, Wien
- Retired: 1959
Medal record
Ladies' figure skating
Representing Austria
World Championships
Silver medal – second place	1959 Colorado Springs	Ladies' singles
Bronze medal – third place	1958 Paris	Ladies' singles
European Championships
Gold medal – first place	1959 Davos	Ladies' singles
Silver medal – second place	1958 Bratislava	Ladies' singles
Bronze medal – third place	1957 Vienna	Ladies' singles

Hanna "Hannerl" Walter (born 24 November 1939) is an Austrian figure skater. She is the 1959 European champion and World silver medalist. She represented Austria at the 1956 Winter Olympics, where she placed 7th.

== Competitive highlights ==
International
Event	1953	1954	1955	1956	1957	1958	1959
Winter Olympics				7th			
World Championships				7th	6th	3rd	2nd
European Championships		9th	5th	5th	3rd	2nd	1st
National
Austrian Championships	3rd		3rd				1st
