= Carla Tichatschek =

Italian figure skater

Personal information
- Other names: Karla Maria Tichatschek
- Born: 6 January 1941
- Died: 29 January 2015 (aged 74)

Figure skating career
- Country: Italy
- Retired: c. 1960

Karla Maria "Carla" Tichatschek (6 January 1941 – 29 January 2015) was an Italian figure skater who competed in ladies' singles. She represented Italy at the 1960 Winter Olympics in Squaw Valley, California. She also appeared at four World Championships and three European Championships.

== Competitive highlights ==
International
Event	1956–57	1957–58	1958–59	1959–60
Winter Olympics				16th
World Champ.	18th	20th	13th	22nd
European Champ.	16th		13th	14th
National
Italian Championships		1st	1st	2nd
