= Anthony Holles (figure skater) =

British pair skater

Personal information
- Full name: Anthony Frederick Holles
- Born: 8 February 1939 (age 87) Liverpool, England

Figure skating career
- Country: United Kingdom
Medal record
Representing United Kingdom
Pairs' Figure skating
European Championships
Bronze medal – third place	1959 Davos	Pairs
Bronze medal – third place	1958 Bratislava	Pairs

Anthony Frederick Holles (born 8 February 1939 in Liverpool, England) is a former British pair skater who competed with Joyce Coates. They finished tenth at the 1956 Winter Olympics, captured the bronze medal at the 1958 and 1959 European Figure Skating Championships, and came in fourth at the 1959 World Figure Skating Championships. They retired from competition before the 1960 season, turning professional to take up coaching.

== Results ==
(with Coates)

Event	1956	1957	1958	1959
Winter Olympic Games	10th			
World Championships	7th	5th	4th	
European Championships	4th	5th	3rd	3rd
British Championships	1st	1st	1st	1st
