= Dany Rigoulot =

French figure skater

Dany Rigoulot (born January 13, 1944) is a former French figure skater who competed in ladies singles, most notably at the 1960 Olympics. She was the 1958–59 and 1961 French champion. Her father was Charles Rigoulot, Olympic champion in weightlifting at the 1924 Games.

== Results ==
Event	1956	1957	1958	1959	1960	1961
Winter Olympic Games					13th	
World Championships			14th		11th	
European Championships		15th	9th	8th	11th	5th
French Championships	2nd		1st	1st		1st
