= Norbert Felsinger =

Austrian figure skater

Personal information
- Born: 17 July 1939 (age 86)

Figure skating career
- Country: Austria
- Skating club: Wiener Eislauf Verein, Vienna
Medal record
Representing Austria
Figure skating: Men's singles
European Championships
Silver medal – second place	1960 Garmisch-Partenkirchen	Men's singles
Bronze medal – third place	1959 Davos	Men's singles

Norbert Felsinger (born 17 July 1939) is an Austrian former figure skater. He is a two-time European medalist, having won silver in 1960 and bronze in 1959, and a seven-time Austrian national champion. He placed seventh at the 1956 Winter Olympics and fourth at the 1960 Winter Olympics. His skating club was Wiener Eislauf Verein (WEV).

== Results ==
International
Event	1953	1954	1955	1956	1957	1958	1959	1960
Winter Olympics				7th				4th
World Championships		9th	7th	8th	6th	13th	9th	4th
European Championships		6th	4th	6th	5th	5th	3rd	2nd
National
Austrian Championships	3rd	1st	1st	1st	1st	1st	1st	1st
