= Lev Mikhaylov =

Soviet figure skater

Personal information
- Native name: Лев Фёдорович Михайлов
- Full name: Lev Fyodorovich Mikhaylov
- Born: 26 April 1938 Moscow
- Died: 31 August 2004 (aged 66)

Figure skating career
- Country: Soviet Union
- Coach: Georgy Felitsyn
- Skating club: DSO Spartak; CSK
- Retired: c. 1963

Lev Fyodorovich Mikhaylov (Russian: Лев Фёдорович Михайлов; 26 April 1938 – 31 August 2004) was a Soviet figure skater. He was a five-time Soviet national champion and placed in the top ten at four European Championships.

Mikhaylov began skating at an outdoor rink. He was coached by Georgy Felitsyn and was a member of DSO Spartak and CSK Moscow. After retiring from competition, he worked as a coach. His students included Tatiana Nemtsova and Elena Kotova.

== Results ==
International
Event	1955	1956	1957	1958	1959	1960	1961	1962	1963
Worlds				17th					
Europeans		15th	8th	10th	10th	8th			
National
Soviet Champ.	3rd	1st	1st	1st	1st	1st			4th
