= Peter Jonas (figure skater) =

Austrian figure skater (born 1941)

Personal information
- Born: 18 June 1941 (age 85) Vienna, Nazi Germany
- Height: 1.76 m (5 ft 9 1/2 in)

Figure skating career
- Country: Austria
- Skating club: Eissportklub Engelmann Wien
- Retired: 1965
Medal record
Representing Austria
Men's Figure skating
European Championships
Bronze medal – third place	1965 Moscow	Men's singles

Peter Jonas (born 18 June 1941) is an Austrian former figure skater. He is the 1965 European bronze medalist. He represented Austria at the 1960 Winter Olympics, where he placed 13th, and at the 1964 Winter Olympics, where he placed 7th.

== Competitive highlights ==
International
Event	1956	1957	1958	1959	1960	1961	1962	1963	1964	1965
Winter Olympics					13th				7th	
World Champ.			16th		10th		9th	6th	7th	8th
European Champ.		13th	9th	7th	6th	4th	4th	4th	5th	3rd
National
Austrian Champ.	3rd	2nd	2nd	2nd	2nd	1st	1st	1st	1st	2nd
