= Hans-Jürgen Bäumler =

German figure skater

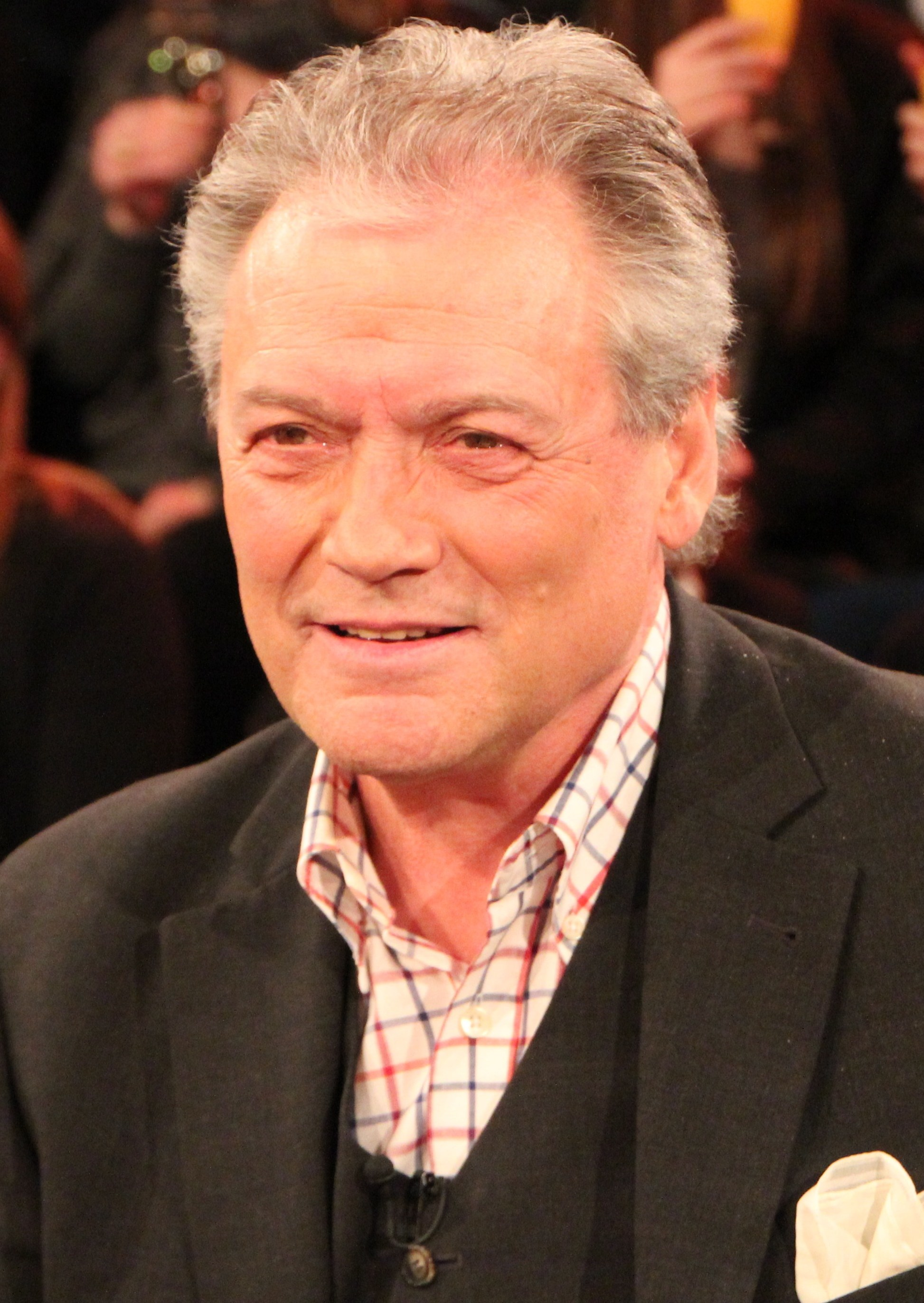
- Bäumler in 2011

Personal information
- Born: 28 January 1942 (age 84) Dachau, Bavaria, Nazi Germany
- Height: 174 cm (5 ft 9 in)

Figure skating career
- Country: West Germany
- Retired: 1964
Medal record
Pairs' figure skating
Representing Germany
Olympic Games
Silver medal – second place	1964 Innsbruck	Pairs
Silver medal – second place	1960 Squaw Valley	Pairs
Representing West Germany
World Championships
Gold medal – first place	1964 Dortmund	Pairs
Gold medal – first place	1963 Cortina d'Ampezzo	Pairs
Bronze medal – third place	1960 Vancouver	Pairs
Silver medal – second place	1959 Colorado Springs	Pairs
European Championships
Gold medal – first place	1964 Grenoble	Pairs
Gold medal – first place	1963 Budapest	Pairs
Gold medal – first place	1962 Geneva	Pairs
Gold medal – first place	1961 West Berlin	Pairs
Gold medal – first place	1960 Garmisch-Partenkirchen	Pairs
Gold medal – first place	1959 Davos	Pairs

Hans-Jürgen Bäumler (born 28 January 1942) is a German former pair skater, actor, and Schlager singer.

== Career ==
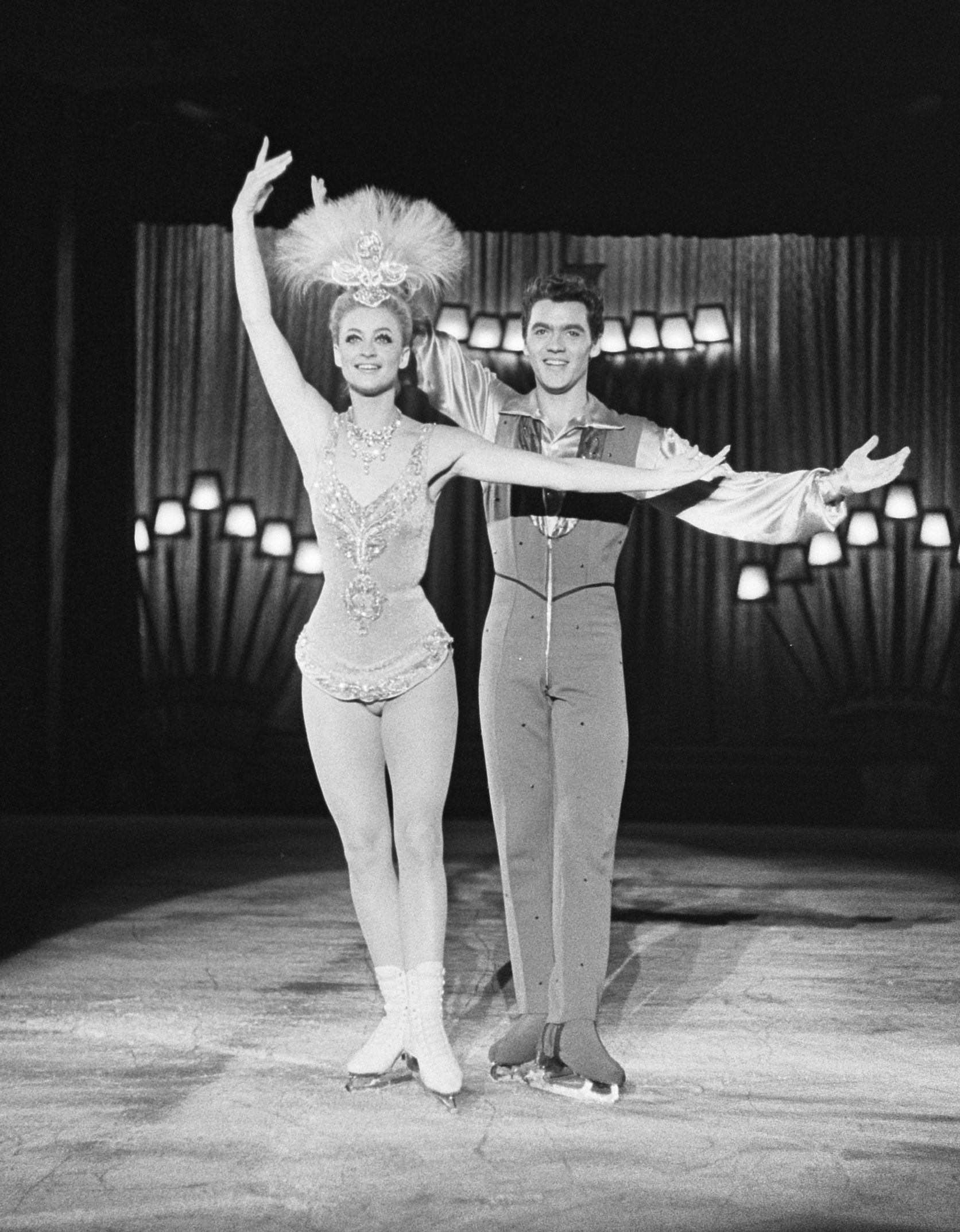
Bäumler and Kilius in 1964

Bäumler became famous in pair skating with his skating partner Marika Kilius. They won their first national title after skating together for just six weeks. Between 1958 and 1964, they won the German nationals four times and became European champions six times and World champions twice. Their coach was Erich Zeller. The duo won a silver medal at the 1960 Olympic Winter Games, and Bäumler became one of the youngest male figure skating Olympic medalists.

In 1964, they won a silver medal again. Their placement caused controversy at the time, as many of the spectators were German and felt that the pair were marked unfairly low, though they had not skated as well as usual at either that competition or the preceding 1964 German Championships. Threatening letters were sent to the event officials, with Suzanne Morrow Francis a particular target due to the low marks she gave the couple, although they were in line with other scores she gave during the competition.

After their loss at the Olympics, the pair considered not competing at the 1964 World Championships, but they were persuaded to do so by Kilius's friend Thomas Fritsch. They created a new free skate for the competition; for the middle part, they copied the program of the Olympic gold medalists, Ludmila Belousova and Oleg Protopopov. The pair won the competition and retired from competitive skating to turn professional. Bäumler later said of their performance at the championships, "That was our absolutely best performance, there was nothing left."

The duo had signed professional contracts and skated as professionals with Holiday on Ice before the 1964 Olympics, a violation of their amateur status and strict IOC rules. In 1966, they were stripped of the medal because of this. As The New York Times reported, the IOC "quietly re-awarded the West Germans their silver medals in 1987, 23 years after the Innsbruck Games, at an executive board meeting in Istanbul. The couple was deemed 'rehabilitated.'"

After their amateur figure skating career, both became singers of German Schlagers (German version of pop songs). In the mid-1960s, they recorded some songs together; Bäumler also had songs as a solo singer. Bäumler's greatest success was the song "Wunderschönes fremdes Mädchen" ("Beautiful Foreign Girl"). The most successful songs of the duo were "Wenn die Cowboys träumen" ("When Cowboys Dream") and "Honeymoon in St. Tropez", both in 1964.

From 1964, Bäumler has also worked as an actor. In 1969, he had a main role in The White Horse Inn, and in 1970 in Maske in Blau (Mask in Blue), both operettas. He was also successful in the television series Salto Mortale. In the mid-1970s, Bäumler hosted several quiz shows, among others Der Apfel fällt nicht weit vom Stamm ("The apple does not fall far from the trunk"), Das waren Hits ("These were hits"), and Was wäre wenn ("What if") on ZDF. Between 1990 and 1993, he worked for RTL. Later, he was also seen as a theatre actor.

== Personal life ==
Since 1974, Bäumler has been married to Marina, a teacher. The couple has two sons, Christoph and Bastian, and lives in Nice, France.

== Results ==
=== Men's singles ===
Event	1955	1956	1957	1958	1959
World Championships		12th		14th	
European Championships		14th	6th	8th	
German Championships	4th	3rd	2nd	3rd	3rd

=== Pairs with Marika Kilius ===
Event	1958	1959	1960	1961	1962	1963	1964
Winter Olympic Games			2nd				2nd
World Championships	6th	2nd	3rd			1st	1st
European Championships	5th	1st	1st	1st	1st	1st	1st
German Championships	1st	1st	2nd	2nd	2nd	1st	1st

== Filmography ==
- 1964: The Great Skate as Hans-Jürgen Bäumler
- 1965: Call of the Forest, as Bernd Helwig
- 1966: The Fountain of Love, as Leif
- 1966: Happy End am Wolfgangsee (Happy End at the Lake Wolfgang), as Mike
- 1966: The Sinful Village, as Herbert
- 1967: The Great Happiness, as Hans-Jürgen Bäumler
- 1967: Paradies der flotten Sünder (Paradies of perky sinners), as Heinz Haller
- 1970: Hurra, unsere Eltern sind nicht da (Hooray, our parents are not here), as Klaus Müller
- 1971: Holidays in Tyrol, as Stefan Hellwig
- 1972: The Merry Quartet from the Filling Station, as Tommy
- 1973: Sonja schafft die Wirklichkeit ab oder … ein unheimlich starker Abgang (Sonja abolishes reality or ... A weird strong leave)

== Schlager songs (selection) ==
- "Wenn die Cowboys träumen" 1964 (with Marika Kilius)
- "Honeymoon in St. Tropez" 1964 (with Marika Kilius)
- "Wunderschönes fremdes Mädchen" 1964
- "Sorry little Baby" 1964

== Awards ==
In 1965, Bäumler as a singer received the bronze "Löwe von Radio Luxemburg".
