= Alain Calmat =

French figure skater, surgeon, and politician

Alain Calmat OLY
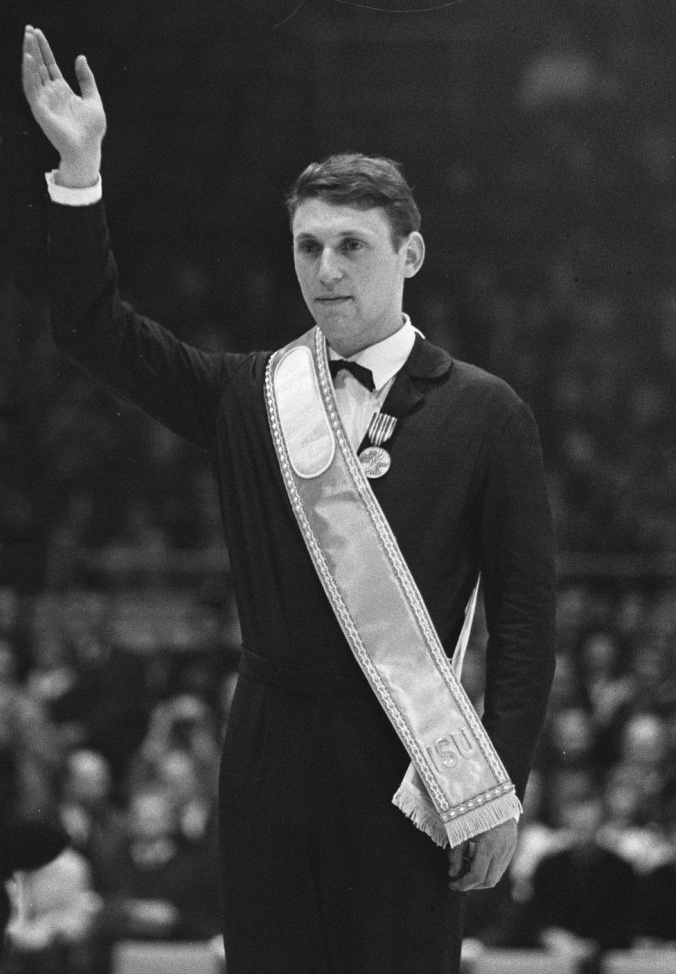
- Alain Calmat at the 1964 World Championships

Personal information
- Born: 31 August 1940 (age 85) Paris, France

Figure skating career
- Country: France
- Retired: 1965
Medal record
Representing France
Men's figure skating
Olympic Games
Silver medal – second place	1964 Innsbruck	Men's singles
World Championships
Gold medal – first place	1965 Colorado Springs	Men's singles
Silver medal – second place	1964 Dortmund	Men's singles
Silver medal – second place	1963 Cortina d'Ampezzo	Men's singles
Bronze medal – third place	1962 Prague	Men's singles
Bronze medal – third place	1960 Vancouver	Men's singles
European Championships
Silver medal – second place	1965 Moscow	Men's singles
Gold medal – first place	1964 Grenoble	Men's singles
Gold medal – first place	1963 Budapest	Men's singles
Gold medal – first place	1962 Geneva	Men's singles
Silver medal – second place	1961 Berlin	Men's singles
Bronze medal – third place	1958 Bratislava	Men's singles

Alain Calmat (born 31 August 1940) is a French former competitive figure skater, surgeon, and politician. He is the 1964 Olympic silver medalist, the 1965 World champion, the 1962–1964 European champion, and the 1958 & 1962–1965 French national champion.

== Career ==
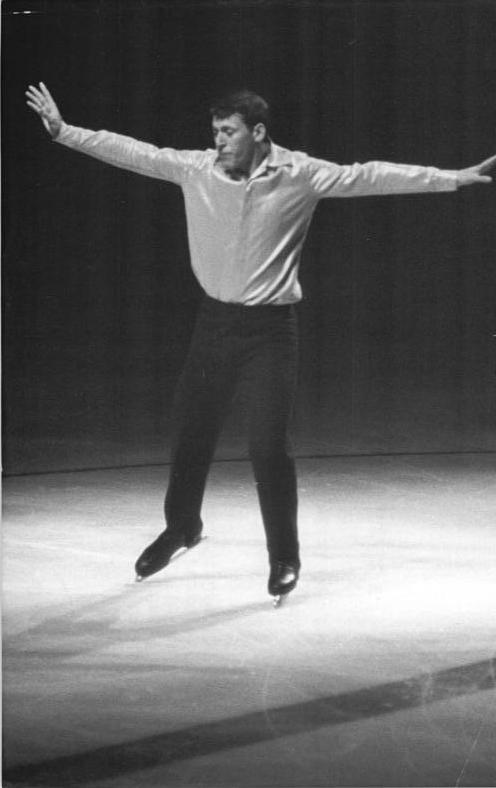
Alain Calmat 1963 in East Berlin

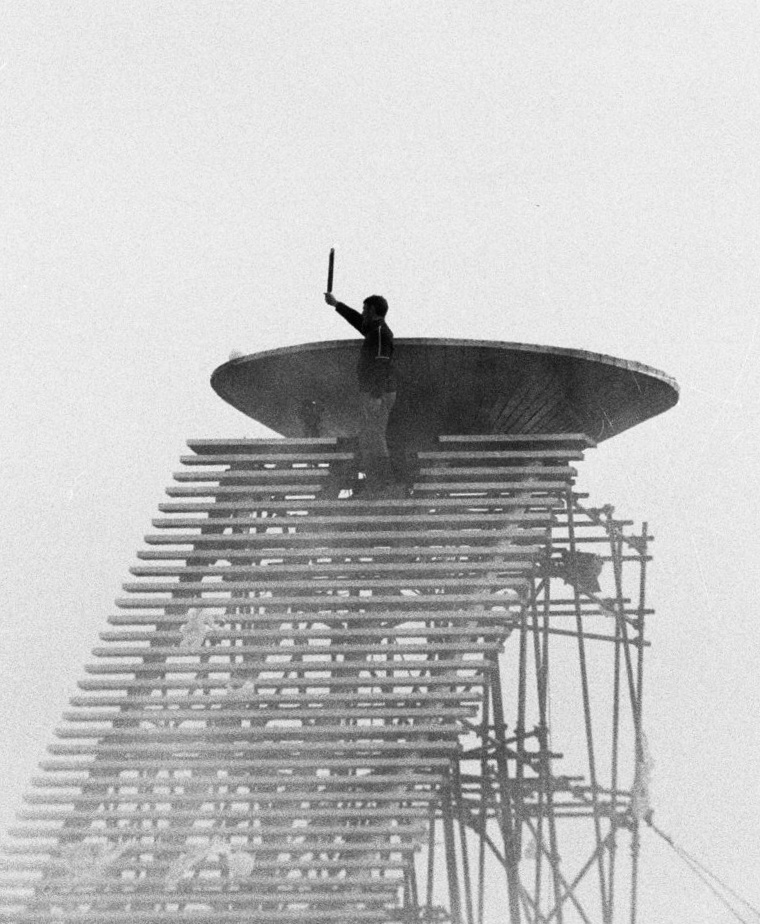
Calmat at the 1968 Olympics

Calmat attended the Cours Hattemer, a private school. He started skating at the age of nine. He had one of the longest figure skating careers in postwar skating, competing in every European, World, and Olympic competition for twelve years. He won the silver medal at the French Figure Skating Championships in 1954 and would go on to win twelve medals at nationals before retiring: seven silver and five gold. He placed ninth at the 1956 Winter Olympics and won the bronze medal at the 1958 European Championships. At the 1960 Winter Olympics, he moved up to sixth place and won the bronze medal at the 1960 World Championships.

The following year, Calmat won the silver medal at the 1961 European Championships. He became European champion for three consecutive years from 1962 to 1964. During that period, Calmat was awarded one bronze and two silver medals at Worlds.

At the 1964 Winter Olympics, Calmat won the silver medal and went on to win his second consecutive silver medal at Worlds. He stayed in one more season and retired as the 1965 World champion.

Calmat carried the torch and lit the Olympic flame at the 1968 Winter Olympics in Grenoble, France. He also served as a world judge.

== Competitive highlights ==
International
Event	1954	1955	1956	1957	1958	1959	1960	1961	1962	1963	1964	1965
Olympics			9th				6th				2nd	
Worlds	11th	9th	7th	9th	5th	7th	3rd	*	3rd	2nd	2nd	1st
Europeans	5th	5th	4th	4th	3rd	4th	4th	2nd	1st	1st	1st	2nd
Universiade							1st					
National
French	2nd	2nd	2nd	2nd	1st	2nd	2nd	2nd	1st	1st	1st	1st
* Championships cancelled due to Sabena Flight 548 crash.

== After skating ==
Calmat later studied medicine, and became a surgeon.

A socialist, he started in a political career. He was minister of Youth Affairs and Sports between 1984 and 1986 when Laurent Fabius was prime minister. He was elected deputy of the département of Cher from 1986 until 1993. In 1995, he became the mayor of Livry-Gargan. In 1997 he became a deputy in the French National Assembly.

Calmat was inducted into the International Jewish Sports Hall of Fame in 1987.

== See also ==
- List of Olympic medalists in figure skating
- Politics of France
- List of select Jewish figure skaters

Olympic Games
Preceded by Yoshinori Sakai	Final Olympic torchbearer Grenoble 1968	Succeeded by Enriqueta Basilio
Preceded by Josef Rieder	Final Winter Olympic torchbearer Grenoble 1968	Succeeded by Hideo Takada
