= British Figure Skating Championships =

Recurring figure skating competition

- Status: Active
- Genre: National championships
- Frequency: Annual
- Venue: IceSheffield
- Location: Sheffield, England
- Country: (United Kingdom) Great Britain
- Inaugurated: 1903
- Organiser: British Ice Skating

The British Figure Skating Championships are an annual figure skating competition organised by British Ice Skating to crown the national champions of Great Britain. The first official British Championships were held in 1903 in London. The competition – originally called the Swedish Challenge Cup – allowed for both men and women to compete, and consisted of compulsory figures and free skating; Madge Syers was the winner. Pair skating was added to the championships in 1921, separate competitions for men and women in 1927, and ice dance in 1937. They have been interrupted only three times since their inception.

Medals are awarded in men's singles, women's singles, pair skating, and ice dance at the senior and junior levels, although each discipline may not necessarily be held every year due to a lack of participants. John Page currently holds the record for winning the most British Championship titles in men's singles (with eleven). In addition, Page and his partner Ethel Muckelt hold the record in pair skating (with nine). Jenna McCorkell holds the record in women's singles (with eleven), while Lilah Fear and Lewis Gibson hold the record ice dance (with eight).

== History ==
The championships were originally called the Swedish Challenge Cup and were inaugurated by the National Skating Association of Great Britain in 1903, but were not established as the British Championships until 1906. The Swedish Challenge Cup had been presented to Great Britain on behalf of the Stockholm General Skating Club (Swedish: Stockholms Allmänna Skridskoklubb) by Viktor Balck, the then-president of the International Skating Union.

In the beginning, the British Championships were explicitly for skating in the international style, versus the English style, which had once been the standard in Great Britain. The international style incorporated ballet and dance movements with ice skating and was championed by early British skaters like Edgar Syers and Henry Yglesias. The English style, on the other hand, was much more rigid and formal, and focussed on the tracing of elaborate special figures. The International Skating Union had adopted the international style as the standard for all international competitions in 1897.

The inaugural competition in 1903 was won by Madge Syers. Pair skating was added to the championships in 1921. Although women had competed since the championships began, figure skating was dominated by men at the time, so a separate category for women was established in 1927. Kathleen Shaw, the winner of the inaugural women's event, stated: "It is much fairer now that there is a championship for women as well as for men ... It is possible that ice skating will become more popular now that women are allowed their own championship." Ice dance became a championship event in 1937, although the ice dance competitions were for many years held separately from the other events. From 1951 to 1987, the British Ice Dance Championships were held annually at the Nottingham Ice Stadium in Nottingham.

The British Championships were open to skaters from members of the British Commonwealth; skaters from Australia, Canada, and South Africa occasionally competed. They have been interrupted three times since their inception: between 1915 and 1920 due to World War I, between 1940 and 1945 due to World War II, and in 2021 due to the COVID-19 pandemic.

== Senior medallists ==
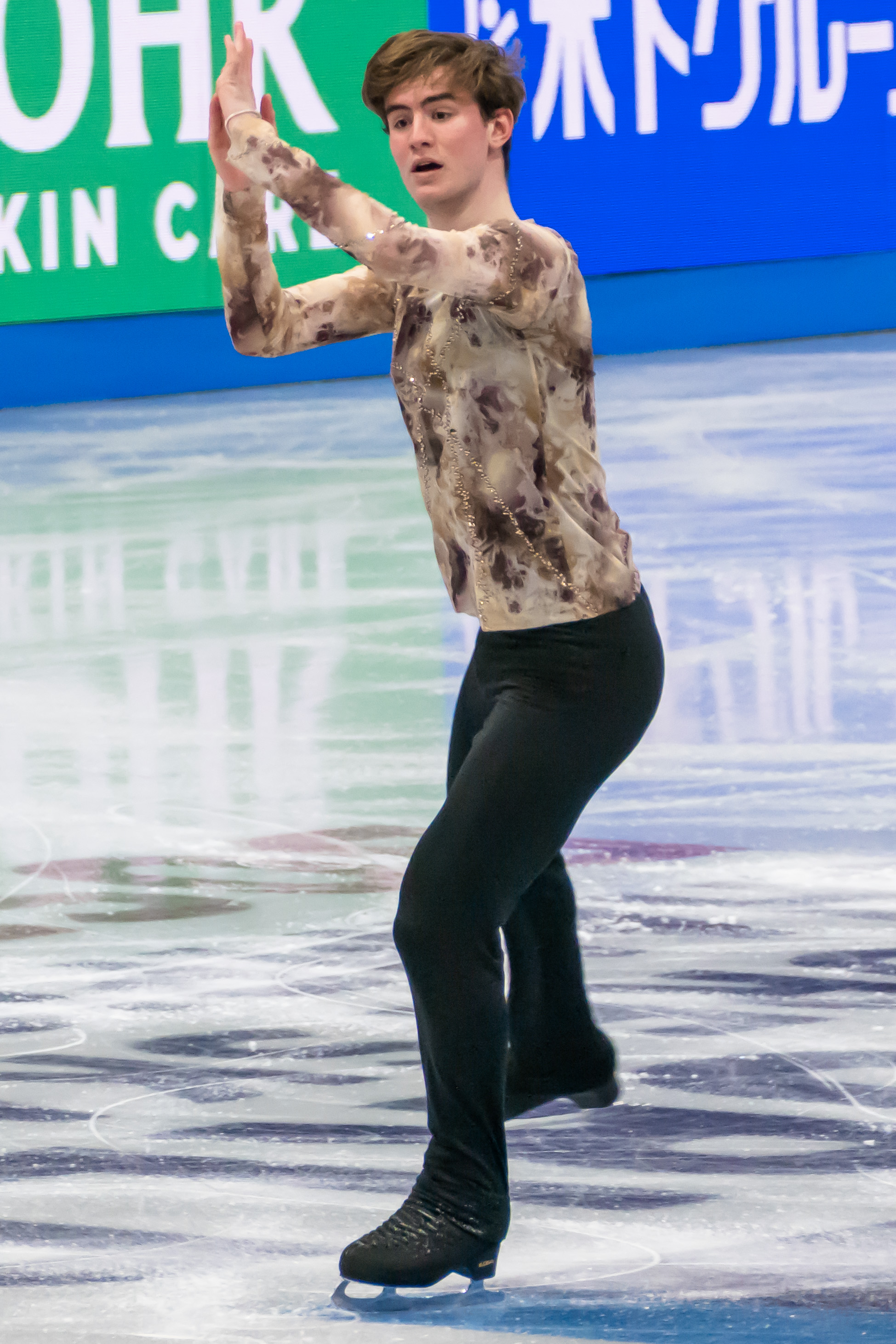
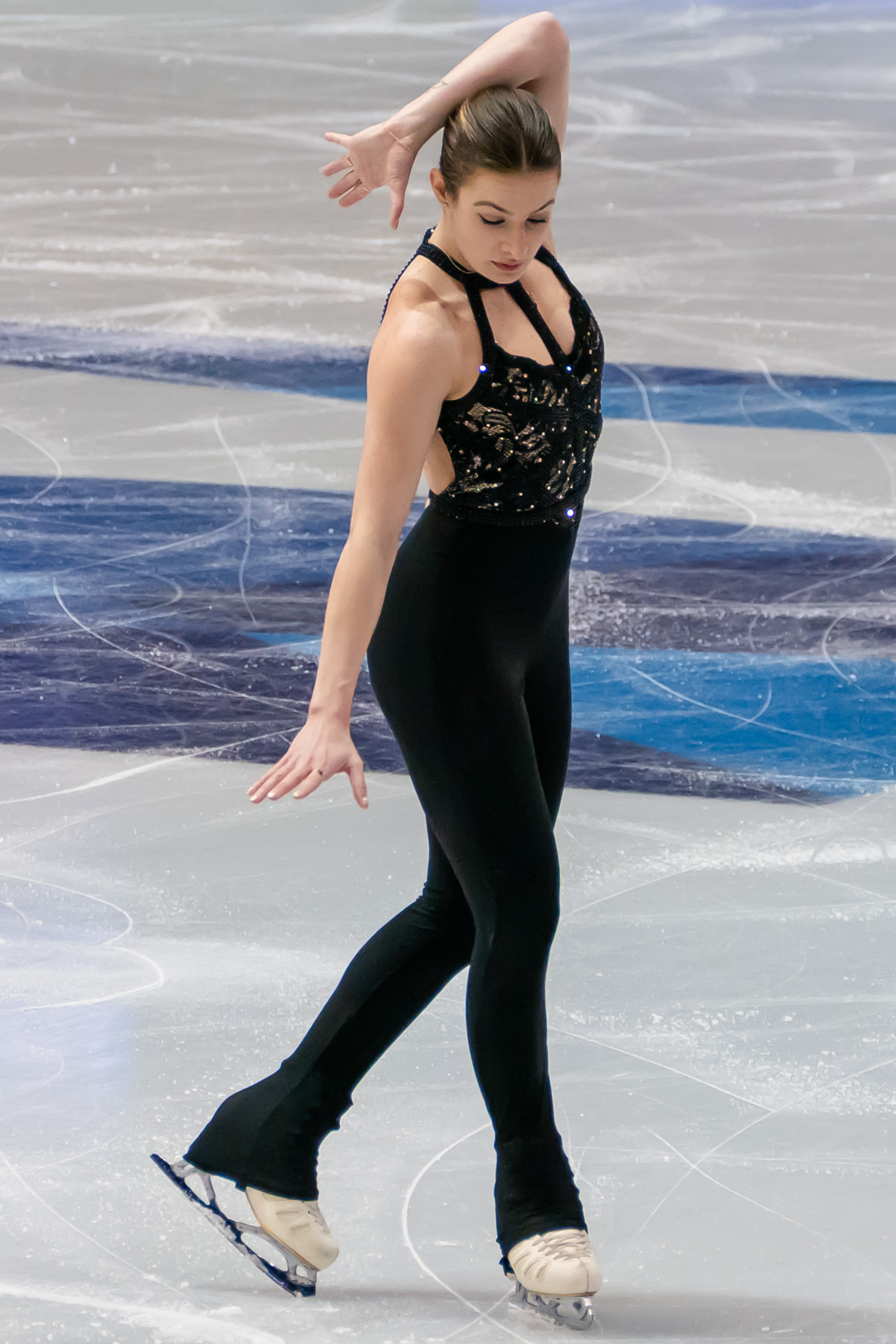
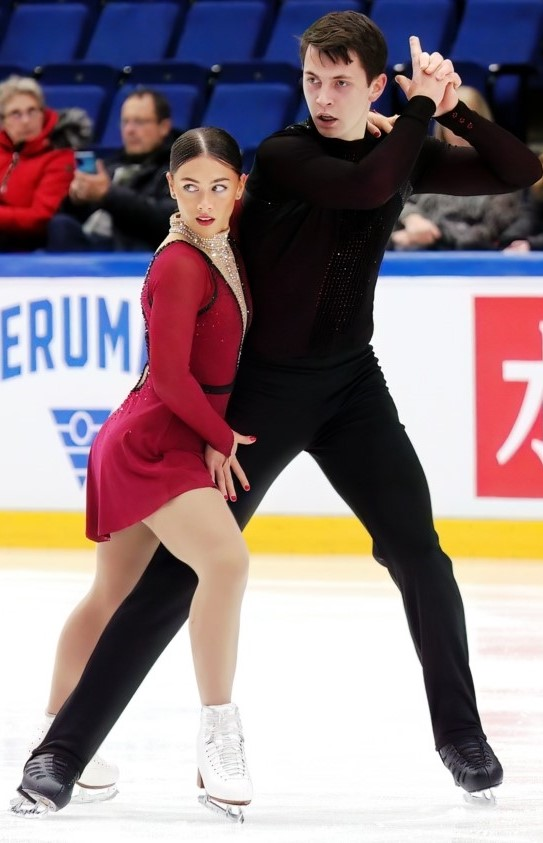
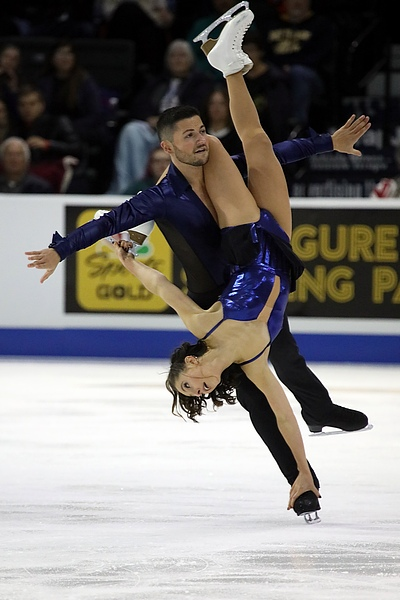
The reigning British figure skating champions (from left to right): Edward Appleby (men's singles); Kristen Spours (women's singles); Anastasia Vaipan-Law and Luke Digby (pair skating); and Lilah Fear and Lewis Gibson (ice dance)

=== Singles ===
Before 1927, men and women in single skating competed in the same event.

Senior singles event medallists
Year	Location	Gold	Silver	Bronze	Ref.
1903	London	Madge Syers	Horatio Torromé	Henry Yglesias	
1904	London	Madge Syers	Edgar Syers	James Henry Johnson	
1905	London	Horatio Torromé	Henry Yglesias	Keiller Greig	
1906	London	Horatio Torromé	Keiller Greig	Henry Yglesias	
1907	London	Keiller Greig	Horatio Torromé	Dorothy Greenhough-Smith	
1908	London	Dorothy Greenhough-Smith	Albert March	Kinsley Field	
1909	London	Keiller Greig	Albert March	Dorothy Greenhough-Smith	
1910	London	Keiller Greig	Arthur Cumming	Gwendoline Lycett	
1911	London	Dorothy Greenhough-Smith	Albert March	Arthur Cumming	
1912	London	Arthur Cumming	Basil Williams	Albert March	
1913	London	Basil Williams	Phyllis Johnson	Herbert Clarke	
1914	London	Arthur Cumming	Phyllis Johnson	Herbert Clarke	
1915–20	No competitions due to World War I				
1921	Manchester	Phyllis Johnson	Kenneth Macdonald Beaumont	Ethel Muckelt	
1922	Manchester	John Page	Ethel Muckelt	Herbert Clarke	
1923	Manchester	John Page	Ethel Muckelt	Herbert Clarke	
1924	Manchester	John Page	Ian Bowhill	Herbert Clarke	
1925	Manchester	John Page	Kathleen Shaw	No other competitors	
1926	Manchester	John Page	Kathleen Shaw	Ian Bowhill	

=== Men’s singles ===
John Curry, five-time British national champion, died in April 1994. Great Britain hosted the John Curry Memorial in his honor in Sheffield in 2007 as part of the ISU Junior Grand Prix of Figure Skating series. The event was held twice more, also in Sheffield, in 2008 and 2010.

Senior men's event medallists
Year	Location	Gold	Silver	Bronze	Ref.
1927	Westminster	John Page	Ian Bowhill	Dr. H.O.J. White	
1928	Manchester	John Page	Montgomery Wilson (Canada)	Ian Bowhill	
1929	London	John Page	Ian Bowhill	Dr. H.O.J. White	
1930	Manchester	John Page	Proctor Burman	No other competitors	
1931	Oxford	John Page	William Clunie	Dr. H.O.J. White	
1932	Purley	Ian Bowhill	L.G. Cox	H. Constantine	
1933	Bournemouth	John Page	Henry Graham Sharp	T.C. Patrick Low	
1934	Manchester	Henry Graham Sharp	Jack Dunn	Maurice Bennett	
1935	Westminster	Henry Graham Sharp	Jack Dunn	Freddie Tomlins	
1936	Streatham	Henry Graham Sharp	Freddie Tomlins	No other competitors	
1937	Harringay	Henry Graham Sharp	Freddie Tomlins	Geoffrey Yates	
1938	Wembley	Henry Graham Sharp	Freddie Tomlins	Geoffrey Yates	
1939	Wembley	Henry Graham Sharp	Freddie Tomlins	Tony Austin	
1940–45	No competitions due to World War II				
1946	Wembley	Henry Graham Sharp	Arthur Apfel (South Africa)	Adrian Pryce-Jones	
1947	Wembley	Arthur Apfel (South Africa)	No other competitors		
1948	Wembley	Henry Graham Sharp	Dennis Silverthorne	Adrian Pryce-Jones	
1949	London	No men's competitors			
1950	London	Michael Carrington	Reginald Park (Australia)	John Elliott	
1951	London	Michael Carrington	Ian Small	No other competitors	
1952	London	Adrian Swan (Australia)	No other competitors		
1953	Streatham	Michael Booker	Geoffrey Duncan	No other competitors	
1954	Streatham	Michael Booker	No other competitors		
1955	Streatham	Michael Booker	Brian Tuck	Keith Kelley	
1956	Streatham	Michael Booker	Brian Tuck	Keith Kelley	
1957	Streatham	Michael Booker	Brian Tuck	Keith Kelley	
1958	Streatham	Michael Booker	Keith Kelley	Rodney Ward	
1959	Nottingham	David Clements	Peter Burrows	Keith Kelley	
1960	Streatham	Robin Jones	David Clements	No other competitors	
1961	Streatham	Robin Jones (Note: The title of British champion was not awarded in 1961, because the judges felt that none of the competitors had met the necessary performance standards.)	David Clements	Malcolm Cannon	
1962	Streatham	Robin Jones	Malcolm Cannon	Hywel Evans	
1963	Richmond	Malcolm Cannon	Hywel Evans	No other competitors	
1964	Wembley	Hywel Evans	Malcolm Cannon	Harold Williams	
1965	Wembley	Hywel Evans	Malcolm Cannon	Michael Williams	
1966	Wembley	Malcolm Cannon	Michael Williams	Harold Williams	
1967	Streatham	Michael Williams	Haig Oundjian	Harold Williams	
1968	Richmond	Michael Williams	Haig Oundjian	Harold Williams	
1969	Richmond	Haig Oundjian	John Curry	Michael Edmonds	
1970	Richmond	Haig Oundjian	John Curry	Michael Fish	
1971	Richmond	John Curry	Haig Oundjian	Michael Fish	
1972	Richmond	Haig Oundjian	John Curry	Gordon Anderson	
1973	Richmond	John Curry	Michael Fish	Robin Cousins	
1974	Richmond	John Curry	Robin Cousins	Glyn Jones	
1975	Richmond	John Curry	Robin Cousins	Stefan Wertans	
1976	Richmond	John Curry	Robin Cousins	Glyn Jones	
1977	Richmond	Robin Cousins	Glyn Jones	Andrew Bestwick	
1978	Richmond	Robin Cousins	Andrew Bestwick	Christopher Howarth	
1979	Richmond	Robin Cousins	Christopher Howarth	Mark Pepperday	
1980	Richmond	Robin Cousins	Christopher Howarth	Andrew Bestwick	
1981	Richmond	Christopher Howarth	Andrew Bestwick	Mark Pepperday	
1982	Richmond	Mark Pepperday	Christopher Howarth	Paul Robinson	
1983	Solihull	Mark Pepperday	Paul Robinson	Neil Cushley	
1984	Solihull	Mark Pepperday	Paul Robinson	Stephen Pickavance	
1985	Richmond	Stephen Pickavance	Paul Robinson	Spencer Durrant	
1986	Solihull	Stephen Pickavance	Paul Robinson	David Reynolds	
1987	Solihull	Paul Robinson	Spencer Durrant	Ashley Moore	
1988	London	Paul Robinson	Ashley Moore	David Reynolds	
1989	Birmingham	Christian Newberry	John Martin	David Reynolds	
1990	Basingstoke	Steven Cousins	Christian Newberry	Leigh Yip	
1991	Basingstoke	Steven Cousins	Leigh Yip	Simon Briggs	
1992	Hull	Steven Cousins	John Martin	James Beaton	
1993	Milton Keynes	Steven Cousins	John Martin	David Ings	
1994	Basingstoke	Steven Cousins	John Martin	David Ings	
1995	Hull	Steven Cousins	Clive Shorten	Stuart Bell	
1996	Basingstoke	Steven Cousins	Neil Wilson	David Ings	
1997	Guildford	Neil Wilson	Steven Cousins	Clive Shorten	
1998	Hull	Steven Cousins	Neil Wilson	Clive Shorten	
1999	Milton Keynes	Clive Shorten	Matthew Davies	Stuart Bell	
2000	Belfast	Neil Wilson	Alan Street	Matthew Davies	
2001	Ayr	Alan Street	Neil Wilson	James Black	
2002	Basingstoke	Matthew Davies	James Black	David Hartley	
2003	Dumfries	Neil Wilson	James Black	Matthew Wilkinson	
2004	Sheffield	Matthew Davies	Neil Wilson	Stuart Bell	
2005	Nottingham	John Hamer	James Black	David Hartley	
2006	Sheffield	John Hamer	Thomas Paulson	David Hartley	
2007	Nottingham	John Hamer	Thomas Paulson	David Richardson	
2008	Sheffield	Elliot Hilton	Thomas Paulson	Tristan Cousins	
2009	Nottingham	Matthew Parr	David Richardson	Robert Murray	
2010	Sheffield	Matthew Parr	Thomas Paulson	David Richardson	
2011	Sheffield	David Richardson	Matthew Parr	Phillip Harris	
2012	Sheffield	Jason Thompson	Luke Chilcott	Phillip Harris	
2013	Sheffield	Matthew Parr	Harry Mattick	David Richardson	
2014	Sheffield	Matthew Parr	Lewis Gibson	David Richardson	
2015	Sheffield	Phillip Harris	Peter James Hallam	Harry Mattick	
2016	Sheffield	Phillip Harris	Peter James Hallam	Jamie Wright	
2017	Sheffield	Graham Newberry	Peter James Hallam	Phillip Harris	
2018	Sheffield	Phillip Harris	Peter James Hallam	Graham Newberry	
2019	Sheffield	Graham Newberry	Peter James Hallam	Harry Mattick	
2020	Sheffield	Peter James Hallam	Graham Newberry	Harry Mattick	
2021	Sheffield	Competition cancelled due to the COVID-19 pandemic			
2022	Sheffield	Graham Newberry	Peter James Hallam	Elliot Thompson	
2023	Sheffield	Graham Newberry	Edward Appleby	Henry Privett-Mendoza	
2024	Sheffield	Edward Appleby	Freddie Leggott	Ken Fitterer	
2025	Sheffield	Edward Appleby	Freddie Leggott	Tao Macrae	
2026	Sheffield	Edward Appleby	Tao Macrae	Lucas Fitterer	

=== Women's singles ===
Senior women's event medallists
Year	Location	Gold	Silver	Bronze	Ref.
1927	Westminster	Kathleen Shaw	Ethel Muckelt	No other competitors	
1928	Manchester	Constance Wilson (Canada)	Cecil Smith (Canada)	Kathleen Shaw	
1929	London	Kathleen Shaw	Kathleen Lovett	Miss M.L. Shaw	
1930	Manchester	Kathleen Shaw	Joyce Macbeth	Kathleen Lovett	
1931	Golders Green	Marion Lay	Joyce Macbeth	Cecilia Colledge	
1932	Manchester	Megan Taylor	Cecilia Colledge	Joan Dix	
1933	London	Megan Taylor	Cecilia Colledge	Gweneth Butler	
1934	Westminster	Megan Taylor	Cecilia Colledge	Mollie Phillips	
1935	Streatham	Cecilia Colledge	Gweneth Butler	Mollie Phillips	
1936	Westminster	Cecilia Colledge	Mollie Phillips	Belita Jepson	
1937	Westminster	Cecilia Colledge	Megan Taylor	Gladys Jagger	
1938	Wembley	Cecilia Colledge	Megan Taylor	Daphne Walker	
1939	Wembley	Cecilia Colledge	Megan Taylor	Daphne Walker	
1940–45	No competitions due to World War II				
1946	Wembley	Cecilia Colledge	Daphne Walker	Marion Davies	
1947	Wembley	Daphne Walker	Marion Davies	Jeannette Altwegg	
1948	Wembley	Jeannette Altwegg	Marion Davies	Jill Hood-Linzee	
1949	Wembley	Jeannette Altwegg	Barbara Wyatt	Bridget Adams	
1950	London	Jeannette Altwegg	Barbara Wyatt	Beryl Bailey	
1951	London	Jeannette Altwegg	Barbara Wyatt	Beryl Bailey	
1952	London	Valda Osborn	Barbara Wyatt	Patricia Devries	
1953	Streatham	Valda Osborn	Yvonne Sugden	Erica Batchelor	
1954	Streatham	Yvonne Sugden	Erica Batchelor	Clema Cowley	
1955	Streatham	Yvonne Sugden	Erica Batchelor	Dawn Hunter (Australia)	
1956	Streatham	Yvonne Sugden	Erica Batchelor	Dianne Peach	
1957	Streatham	Erica Batchelor	Dianne Peach	Patricia Pauley	
1958	Streatham	Dianne Peach	Patricia Pauley	Diana Clifton-Peach	
1959	Nottingham	Patricia Pauley	Diana Clifton-Peach	Carolyn Krau	
1960	Streatham	Patricia Pauley	Carolyn Krau	Anne Reynolds	
1961	Streatham	Diana Clifton-Peach	Anne Reynolds	Carolyn Krau	
1962	Streatham	Jacqueline Harbord	Diana Clifton-Peach	Barbara Conniff	
1963	Richmond	Diana Clifton-Peach	Jacqueline Harbord	Sally-Anne Stapleford	
1964	Wembley	Sally-Anne Stapleford	Diana Clifton-Peach	Carol-Ann Warner	
1965	Wembley	Sally-Anne Stapleford	Diana Clifton-Peach	Janet Sawbridge	
1966	Wembley	Sally-Anne Stapleford	Diana Clifton-Peach	Sylvia Oundjian	
1967	Streatham	Sally-Anne Stapleford	Patricia Dodd	Linda Davis	
1968	Richmond	Sally-Anne Stapleford	Patricia Dodd	Frances Waghorn	
1969	Richmond	Patricia Dodd	Frances Waghorn	Rita Pokorski	
1970	Richmond	Patricia Dodd	Frances Waghorn	Jean Scott	
1971	Richmond	Patricia Dodd	Jean Scott	Rita Pokorski	
1972	Richmond	Jean Scott	Maria McLean	Gail Keddie	
1973	Richmond	Maria McLean	Jean Scott	Gail Keddie	
1974	Richmond	Jean Scott	Maria McLean	Gail Keddie	
1975	Richmond	Gail Keddie	Yvonne Kavanagh	Karena Richardson	
1976	Richmond	Karena Richardson	Gail Keddie	Deborah Cottrill	
1977	Richmond	Karena Richardson	Deborah Cottrill	Phyllida Beck	
1978	Richmond	Karena Richardson	Deborah Cottrill	Teresa Foy	
1979	Richmond	Deborah Cottrill	Karena Richardson	Teresa Foy	
1980	Richmond	Karena Richardson	Deborah Cottrill	Alison Southwood	
1981	Richmond	Karen Wood	Deborah Cottrill	Beverley Dempsey	
1982	Richmond	Deborah Cottrill	Karen Wood	Diana Rankin	
1983	Solihull	Karen Wood	Alison Southwood	Susan Jackson	
1984	Solihull	Susan Jackson	Diana Rankin	Karen Wood	
1985	Richmond	Susan Jackson	Karen Wood	Fiona Hamilton	
1986	Solihull	Joanne Conway	Susan Jackson	Fiona Ritchie	
1987	Solihull	Joanne Conway	Fiona Hamilton	Gina Fulton	
1988	London	Joanne Conway	Gina Fulton	Fiona Ritchie	
1989	Birmingham	Joanne Conway	Jacqueline Soames	Louisa Danskin	
1990	Basingstoke	Emma Murdoch	Joanne Conway	Gina Fulton	
1991	Basingstoke	Joanne Conway	Jacqueline Soames	Andrea Law	
1992	Humberside	Joanne Conway	Charlene von Saher	Suzanne Otterson	
1993	Milton Keynes	Charlene von Saher	Emma Warmington	Helen Preece	
1994	Basingstoke	Stephanie Main	Natalia Gorbenko-Risk	Emma Warmington	
1995	Hull	Jenna Arrowsmith	Zoe Jones	Stephanie Main	
1996	Basingstoke	Stephanie Main	Zoe Jones	Kelly McDermott	
1997	Guildford	Jenna Arrowsmith	Zoe Jones	Kelly McDermott	
1998	Hull	Jenna Arrowsmith	Nancy Manning	Tammy Sear	
1999	Milton Keynes	Stephanie Main	Tammy Sear	Zoe Jones	
2000	Belfast	Tammy Sear	Zoe Jones	Jennifer Holmes	
2001	Ayr	Zoe Jones	Jennifer Holmes	Tammy Sear	
2002	Basingstoke	Zoe Jones	Vicki Hodges	Dannielle Guppy	
2003	Dumfries	Jenna McCorkell	Vicki Hodges	Kathryn Hedley	
2004	Sheffield	Jenna McCorkell	Dannielle Guppy	Kathryn Hedley	
2005	Nottingham	Jenna McCorkell	Sarah Daniel	Kathryn Hedley	
2006	Sheffield	Vanessa James	Joanna Webber	Sarah Daniel	
2007	Nottingham	Jenna McCorkell	Vanessa James	Joanna Webber	
2008	Sheffield	Jenna McCorkell	Karly Robertson	Phillipa Pickard	
2009	Nottingham	Jenna McCorkell	Karly Robertson	Karla Quinn	
2010	Sheffield	Jenna McCorkell	Karly Robertson	Laura Kean	
2011	Sheffield	Jenna McCorkell	Karly Robertson	Laura Kean	
2012	Sheffield	Jenna McCorkell	Karly Robertson	Toni Murray	
2013	Sheffield	Jenna McCorkell	Karly Robertson	Katie Powell	
2014	Sheffield	Jenna McCorkell	Karly Robertson	Katie Powell	
2015	Sheffield	Karly Robertson	Michelle Callison	Natasha McKay	
2016	Sheffield	Danielle Harrison	Zoe Wilkinson	Nina Povey	
2017	Sheffield	Natasha McKay	Karly Robertson	Danielle Harrison	
2018	Sheffield	Natasha McKay	Karly Robertson	Kristen Spours	
2019	Sheffield	Natasha McKay	Karly Robertson	Kristen Spours	
2020	Sheffield	Natasha McKay	Karly Robertson	Danielle Harrison	
2021	Sheffield	Competition cancelled due to the COVID-19 pandemic			
2022	Sheffield	Natasha McKay	Karly Robertson	Nina Povey	
2023	Sheffield	Natasha McKay	Kristen Spours	Nina Povey	
2024	Sheffield	Nina Povey	Kristen Spours	Arabella Sear-Watkins	
2025	Sheffield	Kristen Spours	Nina Povey	Saskia Zainchkovskaya	
2026	Sheffield	Kristen Spours	Nina Povey	Emma Lyons	

=== Pairs ===
Senior pairs' event medallists
Year	Location	Gold	Silver	Bronze	Ref.
1921	Manchester	Madeleine Beaumont; Kenneth Macdonald Beaumont	Kathleen Lovett; A. Campbell II	No other competitors	
1922	Manchester	Madeleine Beaumont; Kenneth Macdonald Beaumont	Miss Barnes; W.E. Kay	No other competitors	
1923	Manchester	Ethel Muckelt; John Page	Mildred Richardson; T.D. Richardson	Madeleine Beaumont; Kenneth Macdonald Beaumont	
1924	Manchester	Ethel Muckelt; John Page	Kathleen Lovett; Proctor Burman	No other competitors	
1925	Manchester	Ethel Muckelt; John Page	Kathleen Lovett; Proctor Burman	No other competitors	
1926	Manchester	Ethel Muckelt; John Page	Kathleen Lovett; Proctor Burman	No other competitors	
1927	Westminster	Ethel Muckelt; John Page	Kathleen Lovett; Proctor Burman	No other competitors	
1928	Manchester	Ethel Muckelt; John Page	Kathleen Lovett; Proctor Burman	(Canada); Maude Smith; Jack Eastwood; (Canada)	
1929	London	Ethel Muckelt; John Page	No other competitors		
1930	Manchester	Ethel Muckelt; John Page	Margaret Ord Mackenzie; William Kenneth Ord Mackenzie	Miss E.J. McCleary; H. Constantine	
1931	Oxford	Ethel Muckelt; John Page	Margaret Ord Mackenzie; William Kenneth Ord Mackenzie	Mrs. R.W. Anderson; Mr. R.W. Anderson	
1932	Purley	Margaret Ord Mackenzie; William Kenneth Ord Mackenzie	Mollie Phillips; Rodney Murdoch	Gertrude Burman; Proctor Burman	
1933	Bournemouth	Mollie Phillips; Rodney Murdoch	Ethel Muckelt; John Page	Violet Supple; Leslie Cliff	
1934	Birmingham	Violet Cliff; Leslie Cliff	Ethel Muckelt; John Page	Miss M.W. Thorpe; H. Constantine	
1935	Glasgow	Violet Cliff; Leslie Cliff	Rosemarie Stewart; Ernest Yates	Miss M.W. Thorpe; H. Constantine	
1936	Manchester	Violet Cliff; Leslie Cliff	Rosemarie Stewart; Ernest Yates	No other competitors	
1937	Harringay	Violet Cliff; Leslie Cliff	Daphne Wallis; Reginald Wilkie	Cissy Krieger; Harry Levy	
1938	Wembley	Violet Cliff; Leslie Cliff	Daphne Wallis; Reginald Wilkie	Iris Howles; H. Constantine	
1939	Wembley	Violet Cliff; Leslie Cliff	Daphne Wallis; Reginald Wilkie	Iris Howles; H. Constantine	
1940–45	No competitions due to World War II				
1946	Wembley	Winifred Silverthorne; Dennis Silverthorne	Violet Cliff; Leslie Cliff	Pamela Griffiths; Rupert Griffiths	
1947	Wembley	Winifred Silverthorne; Dennis Silverthorne	Pamela Davis; Ernest Yates	Jennifer Nicks; John Nicks	
1948	Wembley	Jennifer Nicks; John Nicks	Jean Thompson; Robert Ogilvie	Pamela Griffiths; Rupert Griffiths	
1949	Wembley	Jennifer Nicks; John Nicks	Pamela Davis; Peter Scholes	Doris Clayden; Ronald Clayden	
1950	London	Jennifer Nicks; John Nicks	Sybil Cooke; Robert Hudson	Doris Clayden; Ronald Clayden	
1951	London	Jennifer Nicks; John Nicks	Elizabeth Williams; Joseph McCann	Doris Clayden; Ronald Clayden	
1952	London	Jennifer Nicks; John Nicks	Peri Horne; Raymond Lockwood	(Australia); Jacqueline Mason; Mervyn Bower; (Australia)	
1953	Streatham	Jennifer Nicks; John Nicks	Peri Horne; Raymond Lockwood	Jean Westwood; Lawrence Demmy	
1954	Streatham	Jane Higson; Robert Hudson	Alice Smith; Joseph Dixon	No other competitors	
1955	Streatham	Vivien Higson; Robert Hudson	Joyce Coates; Anthony Holles	Heather Birtwhistle; Courtney Jones	
1956	Streatham	Joyce Coates; Anthony Holles	Carolyn Krau; Rodney Ward	(Australia); Jacqueline Mason; Mervyn Bower; (Australia)	
1957	Streatham	Joyce Coates; Anthony Holles	Lesley Norfolk; John Pearce	No other competitors	
1958	Streatham	Joyce Coates; Anthony Holles	Carolyn Krau; Rodney Ward	June Markham; Courtney Jones	
1959	Nottingham	Joyce Coates; Anthony Holles	Jacqueline Pinto; John Anderson	Carol Hayward; Richard Edwards	
1960	Streatham	No pairs competitors			
1961	Streatham	Valerie Hunt; Peter Burrows	Vera Ann Jeffery; Peter Webb	Jean Harby; Malcolm Balchin	
1962	Streatham	Valerie Hunt; Peter Burrows	Vera Ann Jeffery; Peter Webb	No other competitors	
1963	Richmond	Vera Ann Jeffery; Peter Webb	Diane Ward; Raymond Wilson	No other competitors	
1964	Wembley	Vera Ann Jeffery; Peter Webb	Diane Ward; Raymond Wilson	Fiona Hunt; John Bayman	
1965	Wembley	Glennis Parry; John Bayman	Diane Ward; Raymond Wilson	Verona Tosh; Kenneth Babington	
1966	Wembley	Linda Connolly; Colin Taylforth	Verona Tosh; Kenneth Babington	Valerie Taylor; Raymond Wilson	
1967	Streatham	Linda Bernard; Raymond Wilson	Verona Tosh; Kenneth Babington	Linda Connolly; Colin Taylforth	
1968	Richmond	Linda Bernard; Raymond Wilson	Linda Connolly; Colin Taylforth	No other competitors	
1969	Richmond	Linda Bernard; Raymond Wilson	Verona Tosh; Kenneth Babington	No other competitors	
1970	Richmond	Linda Connolly; Colin Taylforth	Elizabeth Todd; Alan Merchant	No other competitors	
1971	Richmond	Linda Connolly; Colin Taylforth	Jayne Torvill; Michael Hutchinson	Ann Angus; Hamish Angus	
1972	Richmond	Jayne Torvill; Michael Hutchinson	Ann Angus; Hamish Angus	Carol Merchant; Alan Merchant	
1973	Richmond	Linda McCafferty; Colin Taylforth	Jayne Torvill; Michael Hutchinson	Sara Smith; Roland Hailston	
1974	Richmond	Wendy Sessions; Chris Harrison	Ann Wylie; Hamish Angus	No other competitors	
1975	Richmond	Linda McCafferty-Myles; Colin Taylforth	Penny Booth; Roland Hairston	Ruth Lindsey; Alan Beckwith	
1976	Richmond	Erika Taylforth; Colin Taylforth	Ruth Lindsey; Alan Beckwith	(Australia); Elizabeth Cain; Peter Cain; (Australia)	
1977	Richmond	Ruth Lindsey; Alan Beckwith	Karen Wood; Stephen Baker	No other competitors	
1978	Richmond	Ruth Lindsey; Alan Beckwith	Susan Garland; Robert Daw	Mark Stewart; Beverley Stewart	
1979	Richmond	Susan Garland; Robert Daw	No other competitors		
1980	Richmond	Susan Garland; Robert Daw	Karen Gingell; Ian Jenkins	No other competitors	
1981	Richmond	Susan Garland; Robert Daw	Dawn Packer; Ian Jenkins	Carol Nelson; Carl Nelson	
1982	Richmond	Susan Garland; Ian Jenkins	Carol Nelson; Carl Nelson	Lisa Cushley; Neil Cushley	
1983	Solihull	Susan Garland; Ian Jenkins	Lisa Cushley; Neil Cushley	Maxine Hague; Andrew Naylor	
1984	Solihull	Susan Garland; Ian Jenkins	Lisa Cushley; Neil Cushley	Maxine Hague; Andrew Naylor	
1985	Richmond	Lisa Cushley; Neil Cushley	Cheryl Peake; Andrew Naylor	Colette Kay; Carl Nelson	
1986	Solihull	Cheryl Peake; Andrew Naylor	Lisa Cushley; Neil Cushley	Colette Kay; Carl Nelson	
1987	Solihull	Cheryl Peake; Andrew Naylor	Lisa Cushley; Neil Cushley	Colette Kay; Carl Nelson	
1988	London	Cheryl Peake; Andrew Naylor	Lisa Cushley; Neil Cushley	Hayley Williams; Neil Herring	
1989	Birmingham	Cheryl Peake; Andrew Naylor	Lisa Cushley; Neil Cushley	No other competitors	
1990	Basingstoke	Cheryl Peake; Andrew Naylor	Catherine Barker; Michael Aldred	Hayley Williams; Neil Herring	
1991	Basingstoke	Cheryl Peake; Andrew Naylor	Catherine Barker; Michael Aldred	Kathryn Pritchard; Jason Briggs	
1992	Humberside	Kathryn Pritchard; Jason Briggs	Cheryl Peake; Andrew Naylor	Vicky Pearce; Clive Shorten	
1993	Milton Keynes	Vicky Pearce; Clive Shorten	Jackie Soames; John Jenkins	Dana Mednick; Jason Briggs	
1994	Basingstoke	Dana Mednick; Jason Briggs	Jackie Soames; John Jenkins	Lesley Rogers; Michael Aldred	
1995	Hull	Lesley Rogers; Michael Aldred	Jackie Soames; John Jenkins	Nicola Thomas; Daniel Thomas	
1996	Basingstoke	Lesley Rogers; Michael Aldred	Nicola Thomas; Daniel Thomas	Karen Hamilton; David Haywood	
1997	Guildford	Lesley Rogers; Michael Aldred	Marsha Poluliaschenko; Andrew Seabrook	No other competitors	
1998	Hull	Marsha Poluliaschenko; Andrew Seabrook	No other competitors		
1999	Milton Keynes	Marsha Poluliaschenko; Andrew Seabrook	Katie Wenger; Daniel Thomas	Sarah Kemp; Michael Aldred	
2000	Belfast	Sarah Kemp; Daniel Thomas	Rebecca Corne; Richard Rowlands	No other competitors	
2001	Ayr	Tiffany Sfikas; Andrew Seabrook	Sarah Kemp; Daniel Thomas	No other competitors	
2002	Basingstoke	Tiffany Sfikas; Andrew Seabrook	No other competitors		
2003–05	No pairs competitors				
2006	Sheffield	Stacey Kemp; David King	No other competitors		
2007	Nottingham	Stacey Kemp; David King	No other competitors		
2008	Sheffield	Stacey Kemp; David King	No other competitors		
2009	Nottingham	Stacey Kemp; David King	Erica Risseeuw; Robert Paxton	No other competitors	
2010	Sheffield	Stacey Kemp; David King	Erica Risseeuw; Robert Paxton	No other competitors	
2011	Sheffield	Stacey Kemp; David King	Sally Riding; Jakub Safranek	No other competitors	
2012	Sheffield	Stacey Kemp; David King	No other competitors		
2013	Sheffield	Stacey Kemp; David King	No other competitors		
2014	Sheffield	Amani Fancy; Christopher Boyadji	Stacey Kemp; David King	Caitlin Yankowskas; Hamish Gaman	
2015	Sheffield	Caitlin Yankowskas; Hamish Gaman	No other competitors		
2016	Sheffield	Amani Fancy; Christopher Boyadji	No other competitors		
2017	Sheffield	Zoe Jones; Christopher Boyadji	No other competitors		
2018	Sheffield	Zoe Jones; Christopher Boyadji	No other competitors		
2019	Sheffield	Zoe Jones; Christopher Boyadji	No other competitors		
2020	Sheffield	Zoe Jones; Christopher Boyadji	No other competitors		
2021	Sheffield	Competition cancelled due to the COVID-19 pandemic			
2022	Sheffield	Anastasia Vaipan-Law; Luke Digby	Zoe Jones; Christopher Boyadji	Lydia Smart; Harry Mattick	
2023	Sheffield	Anastasia Vaipan-Law; Luke Digby	Lydia Smart; Harry Mattick	No other competitors	
2024	Sheffield	Anastasia Vaipan-Law; Luke Digby	Lydia Smart; Harry Mattick	No other competitors	
2025	Sheffield	Anastasia Vaipan-Law; Luke Digby	No other competitors		
2026	Sheffield	Anastasia Vaipan-Law; Luke Digby	Rebecca Ritchie; Kyle McLeod	No other competitors	

=== Ice dance ===
Senior ice dance event medallists
Year	Location	Gold	Silver	Bronze	Ref.
1937	Richmond	Daphne Wallis; Reginald Wilkie	E. Tompson; D.G.M. Veitch	M. Longster; H.H. MacKeown	
1938	Westminster	Daphne Wallis; Reginald Wilkie	Pauline Borrajo; E. Appleby	G. Grover; R.T. James	
1939	Westminster	Daphne Wallis; Reginald Wilkie	Pauline Borrajo; Harry Levy	Isobel Clive-Smith; G. Edmonds	
1940–46	No competitions held due to World War II				
1947	Wembley	Pauline Borrajo; Albert Edmonds	Julie Barrett; William Barrett	No other competitors	
1948	Wembley	Pauline Borrajo; Albert Edmonds	Julie Barrett; William Barrett	Barbara Radford; Alex D.C. Gordon	
1949	Wembley	Sybil Cooke; Robert Hudson	Julie Barrett; William Barrett	Barbara Radford; Alex D.C. Gordon	
1950	Richmond	Sybil Cooke; Robert Hudson	Joan Cheesman; George Bellchambers	Julie Barrett; William Barrett	
1951	Nottingham	Joan Dewhirst; John Slater	Jean Westwood; Lawrence Demmy	Catherine Morris; Michael Robinson	
1952	Nottingham	Joan Dewhirst; John Slater	Jean Westwood; Lawrence Demmy	Nesta Davies; Paul Thomas	
1953	Nottingham	Joan Dewhirst; John Slater	Jean Westwood; Lawrence Demmy	Nesta Davies; Paul Thomas	
1954	Nottingham	Jean Westwood; Lawrence Demmy	Nesta Davies; Paul Thomas	Barbara Radford; Raymond Lockwood	
1955	Nottingham	Jean Westwood; Lawrence Demmy	Pamela Weight; Paul Thomas	Barbara Radford; Raymond Lockwood	
1956	Nottingham	Pamela Weight; Paul Thomas	June Markham; Courtney Jones	Barbara Thompson; Gerald Rigby	
1957	Nottingham	June Markham; Courtney Jones	Barbara Thompson; Gerald Rigby	Catherine Morris; Michael Robinson	
1958	Nottingham	June Markham; Courtney Jones	Catherine Morris; Michael Robinson	Barbara Thompson; Gerald Rigby	
1959	Nottingham	Doreen Denny; Courtney Jones	Barbara Thompson; Gerald Rigby	Catherine Morris; Michael Robinson	
1960	Nottingham	Doreen Denny; Courtney Jones	Mary Parry; Roy Mason	Anne Cross; Francis Leonard Williams	
1961	Nottingham	Doreen Denny; Courtney Jones	Mary Parry; Roy Mason	Linda Shearman; Michael Phillips	
1962	Nottingham	Linda Shearman; Michael Phillips	Mary Parry; Roy Mason	(Canada); Virginia Thompson; William McLachlan; (Canada)	
1963	Nottingham	Linda Shearman; Michael Phillips	Janet Sawbridge; David Hickinbottom	Mary Parry; Roy Mason	
1964	Nottingham	Janet Sawbridge; David Hickinbottom	Yvonne Suddick; Roger Kennerson	Marjorie McCoy; Ian Phillips	
1965	Nottingham	Janet Sawbridge; David Hickinbottom	Yvonne Suddick; Roger Kennerson	Diane Towler; Bernard Ford	
1966	Nottingham	Diane Towler; Bernard Ford	Yvonne Suddick; Roger Kennerson	Janet Sawbridge; Jon Lane	
1967	Nottingham	Diane Towler; Bernard Ford	Yvonne Suddick; Malcolm Cannon	Janet Sawbridge; Jon Lane	
1968	Nottingham	Diane Towler; Bernard Ford	Yvonne Suddick; Malcolm Cannon	Janet Sawbridge; Jon Lane	
1969	Nottingham	Diane Towler; Bernard Ford	Janet Sawbridge; Jon Lane	Susan Getty; Roy Bradshaw	
1970	Nottingham	Susan Getty; Roy Bradshaw	Janet Sawbridge; Peter Dalby	Hilary Green; Glyn Watts	
1971	Nottingham	Susan Getty; Roy Bradshaw	Hilary Green; Glyn Watts	Kay Webster; Malcolm Taylor	
1972	Nottingham	Janet Sawbridge; Peter Dalby	Hilary Green; Glyn Watts	Rosalind Druce; David Barker	
1973	Nottingham	Susan Getty; Roy Bradshaw	Janet Sawbridge; Peter Dalby	Hilary Green; Glyn Watts	
1974	Nottingham	Susan Getty; Roy Bradshaw	Hilary Green; Glyn Watts	Kay Webster; Malcolm Taylor	
1975	Nottingham	Janet Sawbridge; Peter Dalby	Hilary Green; Glyn Watts	Rosalind Druce; David Barker	
1976	Nottingham	Hilary Green; Glyn Watts	Kay Barsdell; Kenneth Foster	Janet Thompson; Warren Maxwell	
1977	Nottingham	Janet Thompson; Warren Maxwell	Kay Barsdell; Kenneth Foster	Kathryn Winter; Nicky Slater	
1978	Nottingham	Janet Thompson; Warren Maxwell	Kay Barsdell; Kenneth Foster	Jayne Torvill; Christopher Dean	
1979	Nottingham	Jayne Torvill; Christopher Dean	Karen Barber; Nicky Slater	Kathryn Winter; Kim Spreyer	
1980	Nottingham	Jayne Torvill; Christopher Dean	Karen Barber; Nicky Slater	Carole Long; John Philpot	
1981	Nottingham	Jayne Torvill; Christopher Dean	Karen Barber; Nicky Slater	Wendy Sessions; Stephen Williams	
1982	Nottingham	Jayne Torvill; Christopher Dean	Karen Barber; Nicky Slater	Wendy Sessions; Stephen Williams	
1983	Nottingham	Jayne Torvill; Christopher Dean	Karen Barber; Nicky Slater	Wendy Sessions; Stephen Williams	
1984	Nottingham	Jayne Torvill; Christopher Dean	Wendy Sessions; Stephen Williams	Sharon Jones; Paul Askham	
1985	Nottingham	Karen Barber; Nicky Slater	Sharon Jones; Paul Askham	Sharon Wilkinson; Panos Pierre Panayi	
1986	Nottingham	Sharon Jones; Paul Askham	Elizabeth Coates; Alan Abretti	Danielle Biss; David Croft	
1987	Nottingham	Sharon Jones; Paul Askham	Elizabeth Coates; Alan Abretti	Danielle Biss; David Croft	
1988	Bracknell	Sharon Jones; Paul Askham	Annalisa Meyers; Justin Green	Julie Linney; Graham Linney	
1989	Birmingham	Sharon Jones; Paul Askham	Karen Quinn; Alan Abretti	Lynn Burton; Andrew Place	
1990	Basingstoke	Lynn Burton; Andrew Place	Anne Hall; Jason Blomfield	Karen Quinn; Alan Abretti	
1991	Basingstoke	Anne Hall; Jason Blomfield	Lisa Bradby; Alan Towers	Melanie Bruce; Andrew Place	
1992	Nottingham	Melanie Bruce; Andrew Place	Anne Hall; Jason Blomfield	Cheryl Rushton; Colin Sturgess	
1993	Humberside	Marika Humphreys; Justin Lanning	Michelle Fitzgerald; Vincent Kyle	Anne Hall; Jason Blomfield	
1994	Sheffield	Jayne Torvill; Christopher Dean	Marika Humphreys; Justin Lanning	Michelle Fitzgerald; Vincent Kyle	
1995	Hull	Michelle Fitzgerald; Vincent Kyle	Clair Wileman; Andrew Place	Lynn Burton; Duncan Lenard	
1996	Basingstoke	Marika Humphreys; Philip Askew	Clair Wileman; Andrew Place	Lisa Dunn; John Dunn	
1997	Guildford	Marika Humphreys; Philip Askew	Marie James; Daniel Gray	Lisa Dunn; John Dunn	
1998	Hull	Charlotte Clements; Gary Shortland	Radmila Chroboková; Justin Lanning	Sinead Kerr; Jamie Ferguson	
1999	Milton Keynes	Charlotte Clements; Gary Shortland	Sinead Kerr; Jamie Ferguson	Marika Humphreys; Vitaliy Baranov	
2000	Belfast	Julie Keeble; Lukasz Zalewski	Charlotte Clements; Gary Shortland	Sinead Kerr; Jamie Ferguson	
2001	Ayr	Marika Humphreys; Vitaliy Baranov	Sinead Kerr; John Kerr	Pamela O'Connor; Jonathon O'Dougherty	
2002	Basingstoke	Marika Humphreys; Vitaliy Baranov	Pamela O'Connor; Jonathon O'Dougherty	Sinead Kerr; John Kerr	
2003	Dumfries	Pamela O'Connor; Jonathon O'Dougherty	Sinead Kerr; John Kerr	Charlotte Clements; Phillip Poole	
2004	Sheffield	Sinead Kerr; John Kerr	Pamela O'Connor; Jonathon O'Dougherty	Marika Humphreys; Vitaliy Baranov	
2005	Nottingham	Sinead Kerr; John Kerr	Pamela O'Connor; Jonathon O'Dougherty	Phillipa Towler-Green; Phillip Poole	
2006	Sheffield	Sinead Kerr; John Kerr	Phillipa Towler-Green; Phillip Poole	Kira Geil; Andrew Symkowski	
2007	Nottingham	Sinead Kerr; John Kerr	Phillipa Towler-Green; Phillip Poole	Nicola Trippick; Jamie Burns	
2008	Sheffield	Sinead Kerr; John Kerr	Phillipa Towler-Green; Phillip Poole	Christina Chitwood; Mark Hanretty	
2009	Nottingham	Sinead Kerr; John Kerr	Phillipa Towler-Green; Phillip Poole	Louise Walden; Owen Edwards	
2010	Sheffield	Sinead Kerr; John Kerr	Penny Coomes; Nicholas Buckland	Christina Chitwood; Mark Hanretty	
2011	Sheffield	Louise Walden; Owen Edwards	No other competitors		
2012	Sheffield	Penny Coomes; Nicholas Buckland	Louise Walden; Owen Edwards	No other competitors	
2013	Sheffield	Penny Coomes; Nicholas Buckland	Charlotte Aiken; Josh Whidborne	Louise Walden; Owen Edwards	
2014	Sheffield	Penny Coomes; Nicholas Buckland	Carter Jones; Richard Sharpe	Sophie Jones; Jordan Brown	
2015	Sheffield	Olivia Smart; Joseph Buckland	Carter Jones; Richard Sharpe	No other competitors	
2016	Sheffield	Penny Coomes; Nicholas Buckland	Carter Jones; Richard Sharpe	Eleanor Hirst; Jordan Barrett	
2017	Sheffield	Lilah Fear; Lewis Gibson	Robynne Tweedale; Joseph Buckland	Ekaterina Fedyushchenko; Lucas Kitteridge	
2018	Sheffield	Penny Coomes; Nicholas Buckland	Lilah Fear; Lewis Gibson	Robynne Tweedale; Joseph Buckland	
2019	Sheffield	Lilah Fear; Lewis Gibson	Robynne Tweedale; Joseph Buckland	Eleanor Hirst; Anthony Currie	
2020	Sheffield	Lilah Fear; Lewis Gibson	Jessica Marjot; Jan Nordman	Rebecca Clarke; Frank Roselli	
2021	Sheffield	Competition cancelled due to the COVID-19 pandemic			
2022	Sheffield	Lilah Fear; Lewis Gibson	Sasha Fear; George Waddell	Eleanor Hirst; Anthony Currie	
2023	Sheffield	Lilah Fear; Lewis Gibson	Eleanor Hirst; Anthony Currie	Charlotte Man; Toby Palmer	
2024	Sheffield	Lilah Fear; Lewis Gibson	Phebe Bekker; James Hernandez	Layla Karnes; Liam Carr	
2025	Sheffield	Lilah Fear; Lewis Gibson	Phebe Bekker; James Hernandez	Sophia Bushell; Antonio Peña	
2026	Sheffield	Lilah Fear; Lewis Gibson	Phebe Bekker; James Hernandez	Sophia Bushell; Antonio Peña	

== Junior medallists ==
=== Men’s singles ===
Junior men's event medallists
Year	Location	Gold	Silver	Bronze	Ref.
1998	Hull	Alan Street	Matthew Davies	James Black	
1999	Milton Keynes	Matthew Davies	Barry Lodge	James Black	
2000	Belfast	James Black	David Hartley	Christopher Tees	
2001	Ayr	Tristan Cousins	David Hartley	Matthew Wilkinson	
2002	Basingstoke	Matthew Wilkinson	John Hamer	Iain George	
2003	Dumfries	John Hamer	Robert Murray	Mark Hanretty	
2004	Sheffield	Matthew Parr	Alex Wilde	Elliot Hilton	
2005	Nottingham	Elliot Hilton	Matthew Parr	Thomas Paulson	
2006	Sheffield	David Richardson	Simon Waller	Matthew Parr	
2007	Nottingham	Jason Thompson	Luke Chilcott	No other competitors	
2008	Sheffield	Phillip Harris	Jono Partridge	Daniel King	
2009	Nottingham	Harry Mattick	Jamie Wright	Luis Douglas	
2010	Sheffield	Harry Mattick	Jamie Wright	Lawrence Evans	
2011	Sheffield	Harry Mattick	Daniel King	Peter James Hallam	
2012	Sheffield	Harry Mattick	Jamie Whiteman	Jack Newberry	
2013	Sheffield	Peter James Hallam	Jamie Whiteman	Charlie Parry-Evans	
2014	Sheffield	Graham Newberry	Peter James Hallam	Charlie Parry-Evans	
2015	Sheffield	Graham Newberry	Josh Brown	Hugh Brabyn-Jones	
2016	Sheffield	Josh Brown	Hugh Brabyn-Jones	Ruaridh Fisher	
2017	Sheffield	Graham Newberry	Ruaridh Fisher	Josh Brown	
2018	Sheffield	Luke Digby	Josh Brown	Edward Appleby	
2019	Sheffield	Luke Digby	Elliot Thompson	Edward Appleby	
2020	Sheffield	Edward Appleby	Connor Bray	Joseph Zakipour	
2021	Sheffield	Competition cancelled due to the COVID-19 pandemic			
2022	Sheffield	Edward Appleby	Freddie Leggott	Ken Fitterer	
2023	Sheffield	Freddie Leggott	Jedidiah Lincoln	Connor Bray	
2024	Sheffield	Jedidiah Lincoln	Tao Macrae	Arin Yorke	
2025	Sheffield	Edward Solovyov	Lloyd Thomson	Jack Donovan	
2026	Sheffield	Arin Yorke	Edward Solovyov	Lloyd Thomson	

=== Women's singles ===
Junior women's event medallists
Year	Location	Gold	Silver	Bronze	Ref.
1998	Hull	Jennifer Holmes	Sarah Daniel	Vicky Hutchinson	
1999	Milton Keynes	Lynne Clarke	Sayna Talebi	Vicky Hutchinson	
2000	Belfast	Vicky Hutchinson	Fiona Palmer	Victoria McCormick	
2001	Ayr	Dannielle Guppy	Kathryn Hedley	Victoria McCormick	
2002	Basingstoke	Constanze Paulinus	Jenna McCorkell	Claire Smith	
2003	Dumfries	Rebecca Collett	Kerrie Brown	Joanna Webber	
2004	Sheffield	Joanna Webber	Karla Quinn	Pauline Smith	
2005	Nottingham	Jody Annandale	Karla Quinn	Jessica Hitchmough	
2006	Sheffield	Sophie Johnson	Lauren Walker	Karla Quinn	
2007	Nottingham	Karly Robertson	Phillipa Pickard	Laura Kean	
2008	Sheffield	Karla Quinn	Amy Tanner	Katie Powell	
2009	Nottingham	Charlotte Robbins	Katie Powell	Stephanie Rigley	
2010	Sheffield	Charlotte Robbins	Taylor Ronald	Natasha McKay	
2011	Sheffield	Katie Powell	Toni Murray	Amani Fancy	
2012	Sheffield	Katie Powell	Isabella Larkin	Amani Fancy	
2013	Sheffield	Lana Bagen	Isabella Larkin	Natasha McKay	
2014	Sheffield	Emily Hayward	Danielle Harrison	Anastasia Vaipan-Law	
2015	Sheffield	Danielle Harrison	Anna Litvinenko	Lana Bagen	
2016	Sheffield	Emily Hayward	Lana Bagen	Anna Litvinenko	
2017	Sheffield	Kristen Spours	Anastasia Vaipan-Law	Anna Litvinenko	
2018	Sheffield	Kristen Spours	Anastasia Vaipan-Law	Anna Litvinenko	
2019	Sheffield	Kristen Spours	Anastasia Vaipan-Law	Anna Litvinenko	
2020	Sheffield	Elena Komova	Jasmine Cressey	Molly Robotham	
2021	Sheffield	Competition cancelled due to the COVID-19 pandemic			
2022	Sheffield	Elena Komova	Christie Anne Shannon	Alana Pang	
2023	Sheffield	Alexa Severn	Alana Pang	Emma Lyons	
2024	Sheffield	Alexa Severn	Alice Smith	Emma Lyons	
2025	Sheffield	Leilah Patten	Arina Vorobeva	Alice Smith	
2026	Sheffield	Alice Smith	Darya Dalgich	Lilian Musgrave	

=== Pairs ===
Junior pairs' event medallists
Year	Location	Gold	Silver	Bronze	Ref.
1998	Hull	Sarah Kemp; Austin Freshwater	Rebecca Corne; Richard Rowlands	Rebecca Wake; Neal Bone	
1999	Milton Keynes	Rebecca Wake; Neal Bone	Rebecca Corne; Richard Rowlands	No other competitors	
2000	Belfast	Rebecca Corne; Richard Rowlands	Charlotte Carmody; Neal Bone	No other competitors	
2001	Ayr	Rebecca Corne; Richard Rowlands	Constanze Paulinus; Neal Bone	Olivia McCoy; Jaymes Monte	
2002	Basingstoke	No junior pairs competitors			
2003	Dumfries	Stephanie Smith; Jaymes Monte	Nicola McNab; Matthew Herbert	No other competitors	
2004	Sheffield	Rebecca Collett; Hamish Gaman	Stephanie Smith; Jaymes Monte	No other competitors	
2005	Nottingham	Stacey Kemp; David King	No other competitors		
2006	Sheffield	No junior pairs competitors			
2007	Nottingham	Sally Hoolin; Jake Bennett	Tamara Drake; Edward Alton	No other competitors	
2008	Sheffield	Sally Hoolin; Jake Bennett	Tamara Drake; Edward Alton	No other competitors	
2009	Nottingham	Sally Hoolin; Jakub Safranek	No other competitors		
2010	Sheffield	Catherine Clement; James Hunt	No other competitors		
2011	Sheffield	Catherine Clement; James Hunt	No other competitors		
2012	Sheffield	Sally Hoolin; James Hunt	No other competitors		
2013	Sheffield	Robynne Tweedale; Steven Adcock	Sofia Tymchyshyn; Daniel Clark	No other competitors	
2014	Sheffield	Molly Lanaghan; Jake Astill	No other competitors		
2015	Sheffield	Annie Royapen; Steven Adcock	Molly Lanaghan; Jake Astill	No other competitors	
2016	Sheffield	Chloe Curtin; Steven Adcock	Harriet Beatson; Jack Newberry	No other competitors	
2017	Sheffield	Gabrielle Levesque; Ben Penhaligon	No other competitors		
2018	Sheffield	Emilia Drury; Aidan Brown	No other competitors		
2019	Sheffield	No junior pairs competitors			
2020	Sheffield	No junior pairs competitors			
2021	Sheffield	Competition cancelled due to the COVID-19 pandemic			
2022	Sheffield	Charlotte Hodgkinson; Elliot Appleby	Neamh Davison; Shailesh Caller	No other competitors	
2023	Sheffield	Lucy Hay; Kyle McLeod	Neamh Davison; Shailesh Caller	No other competitors	
2024	Sheffield	Lucy Hay; Kyle McLeod	No other competitors		
2025	Sheffield	Zarah Wood; Alex Lapsky	Sophie Dracas; Pelham Wright	No other competitors	
2026	Sheffield	Neamh Davison; Daniel Borisov	Zarah Wood; Alex Lapsky	Wakana Katayama; Elliot Appleby	

=== Ice dance ===
Junior ice dance event medallists
Year	Location	Gold	Silver	Bronze	Ref.
1998	Hull	Sharon Hill; Andrew Hallam	Amanda Galloway; Daniel Smith	Eve Bentley; Christopher Lomax	
1999	Milton Keynes	Sharon Hill; Andrew Hallam	Phillipa Towler-Green; Robert Burgeman	Charlotte Goodman; Oleg Tolkach	
2000	Belfast	Eve Bentley; Andrew Hallam	Phillipa Towler-Green; Robert Burgeman	Holly Hambrook; Phillip Poole	
2001	Ayr	Phillipa Towler-Green; Robert Burgeman	Eve Bentley; Andrew Hallam	Corrine Jones; Alessandro Dipietrantonio	
2002	Basingstoke	Candice Towler-Green; James Phillipson	Chloe Millard; David Davies	Joanna May; Andrew Smykowski	
2003	Dumfries	Candice Towler-Green; James Phillipson	Nicola Trippick; Damon Latimer	Kira Geil; Andrew Smykowski	
2004	Sheffield	Nicola Trippick; Damon Latimer	Michelle Royds; Jamie Whyte	Kira Geil; Andrew Smykowski	
2005	Nottingham	Louise Walden; Jamie Whyte	Lauren Bradshaw; Mark Hanretty	Emma Murphy; Harry Souter	
2006	Sheffield	Leigh Rogers; Lloyd Jones	Lindsey Woolstencroft; Jamie Whyte	Rowan Musson; John Horne	
2007	Nottingham	Leigh Rogers; Lloyd Jones	Penny Coomes; Nicholas Buckland	No other competitors	
2008	Sheffield	Penny Coomes; Nicholas Buckland	Lindsey Cohen; Evan Roberts	Sarah Coward; Michael Coward	
2009	Nottingham	Genevieve Deutch; Evan Roberts	Danielle Bennett; Lloyd Jones	Sarah Coward; Michael Coward	
2010	Sheffield	Charlotte Aiken; Josh Whidborne	Danielle Bennett; Joseph Buckland	Sarah Coward; Michael Coward	
2011	Sheffield	Charlotte Aiken; Josh Whidborne	Sophie Jones; Richard Sharpe	Sarah Coward; Michael Coward	
2012	Sheffield	Olivia Smart; Joseph Buckland	Katelouise Bagnall; Rory Shanahan	Sophie Jones; Richard Sharpe	
2013	Sheffield	Olivia Smart; Joseph Buckland	Millie Paterson; Edward Carstairs	Charlotte Dyson; Paul Dredge	
2014	Sheffield	Olivia Smart; Joseph Buckland	Mina Zdravkova; Henry Aiken	Eleanor Hirst; Jake Fearnley	
2015	Sheffield	Ekaterina Fedyushchenko; Lucas Kitteridge	Robynne Tweedale; Edward Carstairs	Lilah Fear; Jacob Payne	
2016	Sheffield	Gwenneth Sletten; Elliot Verburg	Ekaterina Fedyushchenko; Lucas Kitteridge	Mia-Rose Jowitt; Peter Beaumont	
2017	Sheffield	Sasha Fear; Elliot Verburg	Emily Rose Brown; James Hernandez	Jessica Marjot; Aleksandr Jemeljanov	
2018	Sheffield	Sasha Fear; George Waddell	Emily Rose Brown; James Hernandez	Natalia Pallu-Neves; Frank Roselli	
2019	Sheffield	Sasha Fear; George Waddell	Lucy Hancock; Billy Wilson-French	Natalia Pallu-Neves; Frank Roselli	
2020	Sheffield	Emily Rose Brown; James Hernandez	Sasha Fear; George Waddell	Lucy Hancock; Billy Wilson-French	
2021	Sheffield	Competition cancelled due to the COVID-19 pandemic			
2022	Sheffield	Phebe Bekker; James Hernandez	Sophia Bushell; Alex Lapsky	Natalia Pallu-Neves; Jayin Panesar	
2023	Sheffield	Phebe Bekker; James Hernandez	Ashlie Slatter; Atl Ongay-Perez	Molly Hairsine; Alessio Surenkov-Gultchev	
2024	Sheffield	Ashlie Slatter; Atl Ongay-Perez	Lou Koch; Alexander Buchholdt	No other competitors	
2025	Sheffield	Mimi Marler Davies; Joseph Black	Molly Harisine; Alessio Surenkov-Gultchev	Kiah Whieldon; Jamie Hammond	
2026	Sheffield	Ashlie Slatter; Louis Gregory	Annabel Mann; Jack Hammond	No other competitors	

== Records ==
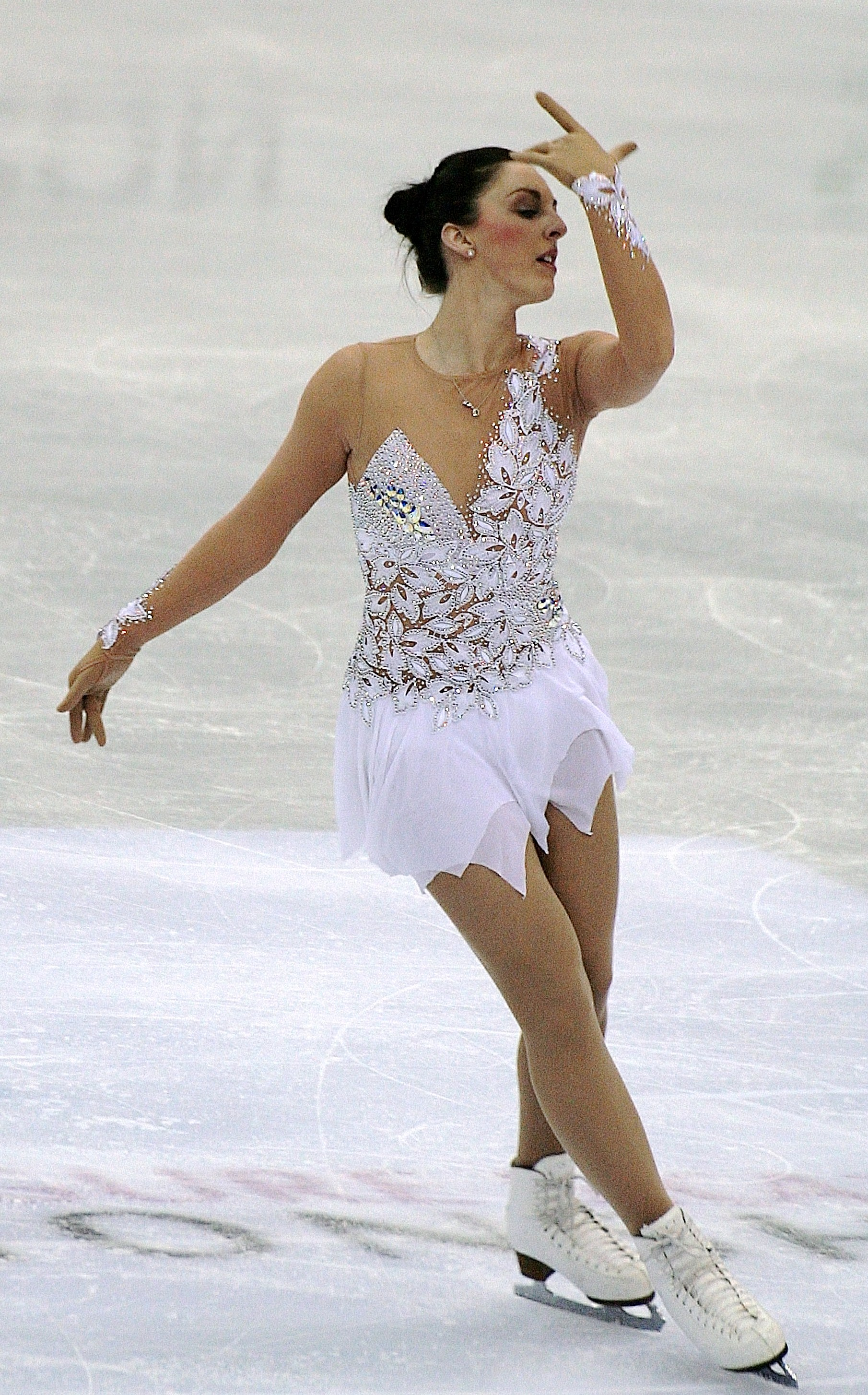
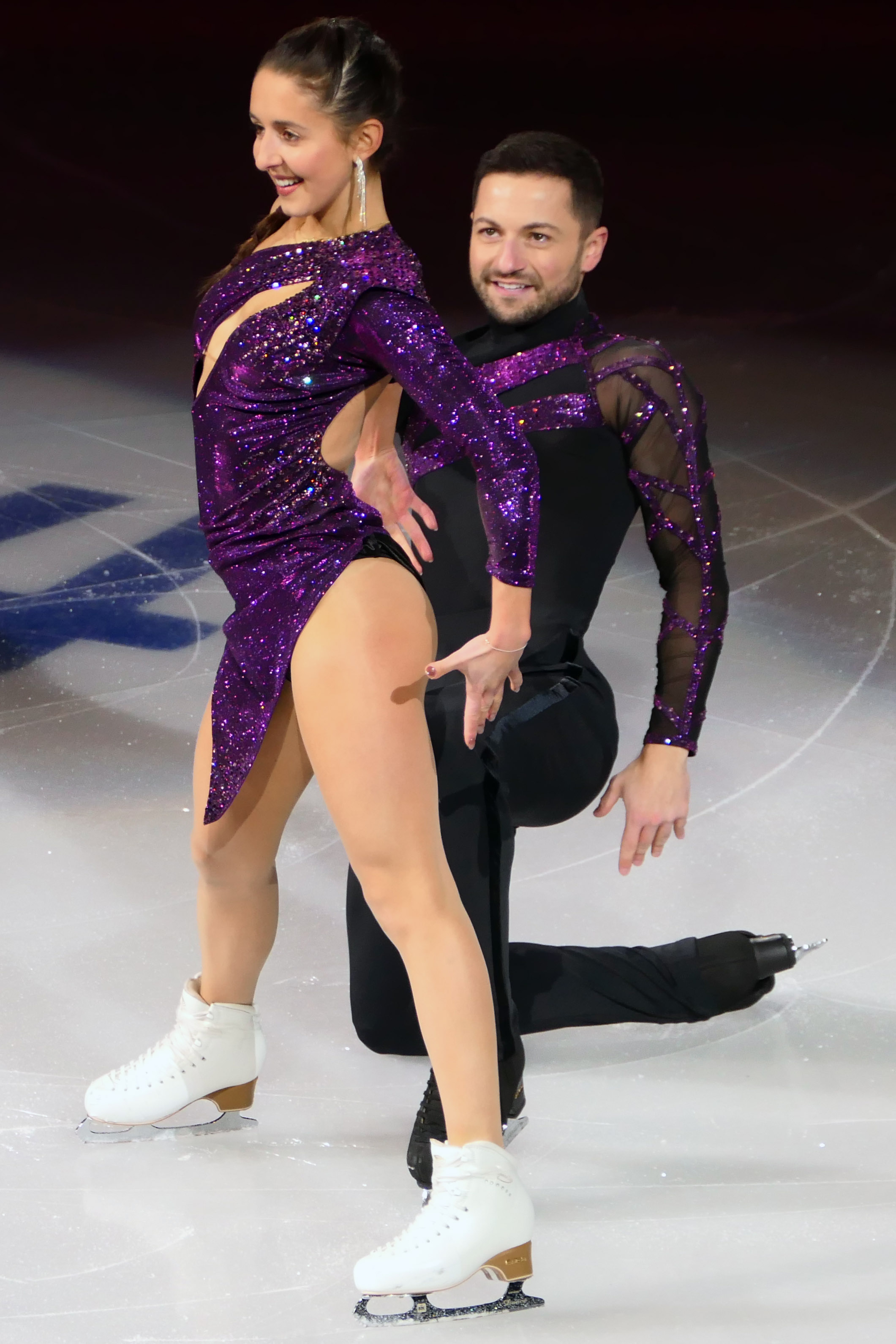
From left to right: Jenna McCorkell won eleven British Championship titles in women's singles, while Lilah Fear and Lewis Gibson have won eight British Championship titles in ice dance.

Records
Discipline	Most championship titles			
Discipline	Skater(s)	No.	Years	Ref.
Men's singles	John Page	11	1922–31; 1933	
Women's singles	Jenna McCorkell	11	2003–05; 2007–14	
Pairs	Ethel Muckelt; John Page	9	1923–31	
Ice dance	Lilah Fear; Lewis Gibson	8	2017; 2019–20; 2022–26	
