= Jacqueline Soames =

British figure skater

Personal information
- Born: 30 September 1968 (age 57) Nuneaton, Warwickshire, England
- Height: 1.52 m (5 ft 0 in)

Figure skating career
- Country: Great Britain
- Partner: John Jenkins
- Skating club: Queens Ice Dance Club
- Retired: c. 1995

Jacqueline Soames (born 30 September 1968) is a British former competitive figure skater. Competing in pairs with John Jenkins, she finished 15th at the 1994 Winter Olympics. Earlier, she competed in ladies' singles, finishing 18th at the 1989 European Championships and twice winning silver at the British Championships.

== Results ==
=== Pairs career with Jenkins ===
International
| Event | 1993–94 | 1994–95 |
|---|---|---|
| Winter Olympics | 15th | |
| International de Paris | 5th | |
National
| British Championships | | 2nd |

=== Singles career ===
International
| Event | 1988–89 | 1989–90 | 1990–91 |
|---|---|---|---|
| European Championships | 18th | | |
| World Championships | 25th | | |
National
| British Championships | 2nd | | 2nd |
