= Jason Briggs =

British pair skater

Jason Briggs (born 21 November 1971 in Sutton-in-Ashfield) is a former British pair skater. With partner Kathryn Pritchard, he won the bronze medal at the 1992 British Figure Skating Championships and finished 17th at the 1992 Winter Olympics. He later teamed with Dana Mednick and won the 1994 national title. The pair finished 17th at the European Figure Skating Championships that year but was unable to compete in the 1994 Winter Olympics due to Mednick's citizenship issues.

After retiring, Briggs became a skating team coach. In 2013, he became the skating director of Chelsea Piers in Connecticut.
