= Viktor Teslia =

Soviet pair skater

Personal information
- Native name: Виктор Иванович Тесля
- Full name: Viktor Ivanovich Teslia
- Other names: Teslya

Figure skating career
- Country: Soviet Union
- Partner: Nelli Chervotkina
- Coach: Ludmila Velikova; Aleksandr Vlasov
- Retired: 1983

Viktor Ivanovich Teslia (Russian: Виктор Иванович Тесля) is a former pair skater for the Soviet Union. With Nelli Chervotkina, he is the 1979 Prague Skate champion, 1982 Skate America bronze medalist, and 1983 Winter Universiade champion. Their coaches were Ludmila Velikova and Aleksandr Vlasov.

Teslia moved to England in the 1990s after being hired as a skating coach in Chelmsford. In the 1998–99 season, he coached British men's champion Clive Shorten and the pairs' silver and bronze medalists, Katie Wenger / Daniel Thomas and Sarah Kemp / Michael Aldred. As of August 2016, he is a Level 3 coach in the U.K. His son, Kiril, was born in the late 1980s.

== Competitive highlights ==
With Chervotkina

International
Event	78–79	79–80	80–81	81–82	82–83
Prague Skate	3rd	1st			
Prize of Moscow News	2nd		2nd		
Skate America					3rd
St. Gervais			1st		
Winter Universiade					1st
National
Soviet Championships	5th		5th		6th
