= Diana Clifton-Peach =

British figure skater

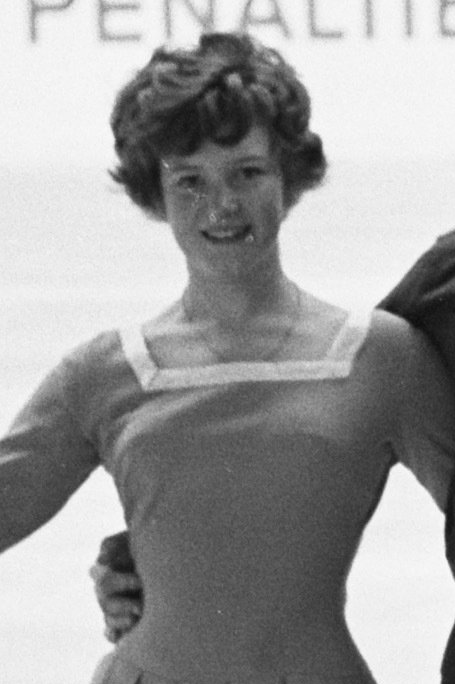
- Clifton-Peach in 1962

Personal information
- Full name: Diana Cynthia Clifton-Peach
- Born: 17 March 1944 (age 82) Bromley, England
- Height: 1.60 m (5 ft 3 in)

Figure skating career
- Country: United Kingdom
- Retired: 1966
Medal record
Commonwealth Winter Games
| Gold medal – first place | 1966 St Moritz | Figure Skating - Women's Singles |

Diana Cynthia Clifton-Peach Stevens (born 17 March 1944) is a British former competitive figure skater. She is a two-time British national champion in ladies' singles (1961, 1963). In 1961, she came in second at the national championships after she won the figures but suffered a knee injury during practice, and she lost the title to Jacqueline Harbord by one placement after the free skate.

Clifton-Peach narrowly missed the podium at the 1957 and 1958 European Championships, finishing fourth each year, and was fifth at the 1958 World Championships. She finished 18th at the 1964 Winter Olympics.

She married Richard Misselbrook Stevens in 1965. After finishing her competitive career, she became a judge.

== Results ==
International
| Event | 55–56 | 56–57 | 57–58 | 58–59 | 59–60 | 60–61 | 61–62 | 62–63 | 63–64 | 64–65 | 65–66 |
|---|---|---|---|---|---|---|---|---|---|---|---|
| Olympics | | | | | | | | | 18th | | |
| Worlds | 12th | | 5th | | | | | 11th | | 11th | |
| Europeans | 6th | 4th | 4th | 9th | | 9th | 5th | 6th | 6th | 6th | 5th |
| Richmond | | | 3rd | 3rd | | | | | | | |
National
| British | | | 3rd | 2nd | | 1st | 2nd | 1st | 2nd | 2nd | 2nd |
