= Stephanie Main =

British figure skater

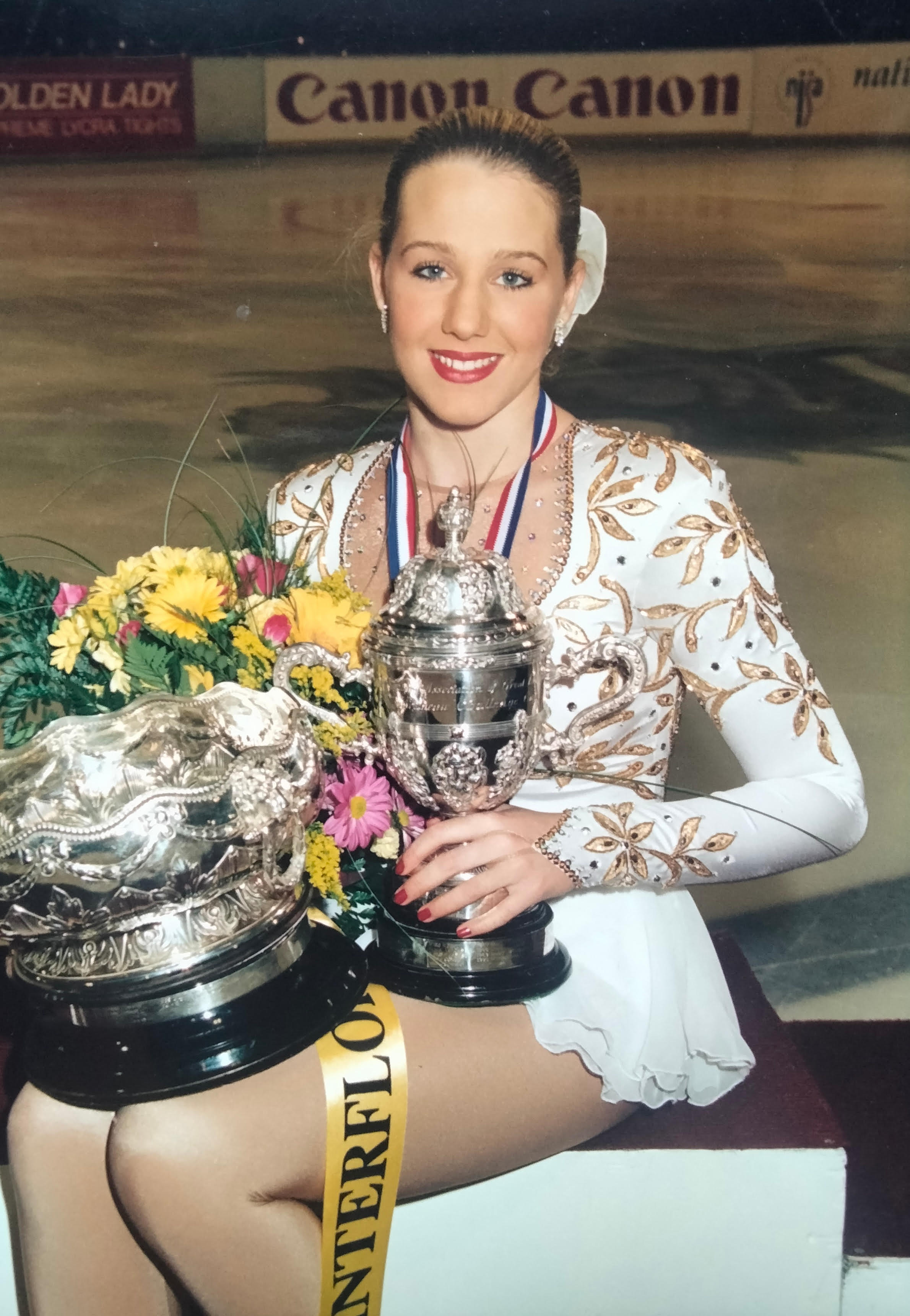
- Stephanie Main at the British Championships in November 1995.

Personal information
- Born: 20 September 1976 (age 49) Edinburgh, Scotland
- Height: 1.57 m (5 ft 2 in)

Figure skating career
- Country: Great Britain
- Coach: Alice Fell, Kathy Casey, Doug Leigh, Debbie Briggs, Kevin Bursey.
- Skating club: Murrayfield
- Began skating: 1979
- Retired: 2001

Stephanie Main (born 20 September 1976) is a British former competitive figure skater. She is a three-time British national champion (1994, 1996, 1999) and five-time Scottish national champion. (1991, 1992, 1993, 1995, 1998) Stephanie also competed in the first ever winter European Youth Olympic Festival held in Aosta 1993. She placed 22nd at the 1996 World Championships. She also competed twice at the European Championships.

Main did not compete in the 1996–97 and 1997–98 seasons. Returning to competition, she won her third national title in the 1998–99 season. In March 1999, she injured knee ligaments, causing her to withdraw from the 1999 World Championships in Helsinki, Finland.

Stephanie Main has trained with coaches nationally and internationally, including the Broadmoor Skating Club in Colorado Springs and the Mariposa School of Skating in Canada.

== Programs ==
Season	Short program	Free skating
1998–99		Backdraft by Hans Zimmer

== Competitive highlights ==
International
Event	91–92	92–93	93–94	94–95	95–96	98–99	99–00	00–01
Worlds					22nd	WD		
Europeans			23rd		27th	WD		
Nebelhorn			18th					
Piruetten					3rd			
Sofia Cup			4th					
St. Gervais				21st				
International: Junior
Junior Worlds			24th					
Blue Swords		12th J						
EYOF		11th J						
Piruetten	3rd J							
National
Scottish Champ.	1st	1st	1st	2nd	1st	1st		
British Champ.		4th	1st	3rd	1st	1st	WD	6th
