= Deborah Cottrill =

British former competitive figure skater

Personal information
- Other names: Debbie Cottrill-Olivier
- Born: 1963 (age 62–63)

Figure skating career
- Country: United Kingdom
- Retired: 1982

Deborah Cottrill (born 1963) is a British former competitive figure skater. She is a two-time British national champion (1972, 1982). Her best international results were fourth at the 1981 World Championships in Hartford, Connecticut and fourth at the 1982 European Championships in Lyon. Originally from Solihull, England, she later moved to Canada with her husband and became a coach in North Bay, Ontario.

== Competitive highlights ==
International
| Event | 74–75 | 75–76 | 76–77 | 77–78 | 78–79 | 79–80 | 80–81 | 81–82 |
|---|---|---|---|---|---|---|---|---|
| World Champ. | | | | | 14th | 9th | 4th | 10th |
| European Champ. | | | 12th | | 9th | 6th | 6th | 4th |
National
| British Champ. | 6th | | | | 1st | | 2nd | 1st |
