= Kathleen Shaw =

British figure skater

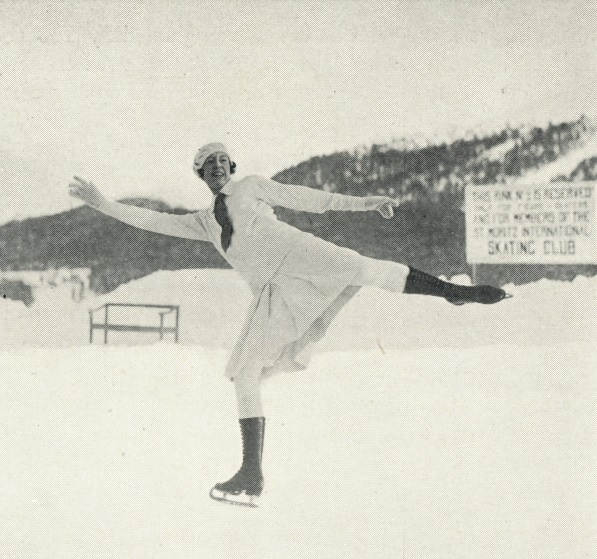
- Skating magazine, December 1927

Personal information
- Full name: Gertrude Kathleen Shaw
- Born: 18 January 1903 Barton-upon-Irwell, Lancashire, England
- Died: 19 July 1983 (aged 80)

Figure skating career
- Country: United Kingdom
- Retired: 1930
Medal record
Representing United Kingdom
Ladies' Figure skating
World Championships
| Bronze medal – third place | 1926 Stockholm | Ladies' singles |

Gertrude Kathleen Shaw (18 January 1903 – 19 July 1983) was a British figure skater. She was born in Barton-upon-Irwell, Lancashire and was the 1926 World bronze medalist. She represented Great Britain at the 1924 Winter Olympics, where she placed 7th, and at the 1928 Winter Olympics, where she placed 14th. She won the inaugural British Figure Skating Championships in 1927.

== Results ==
| Event | 1924 | 1925 | 1926 | 1927 | 1928 | 1929 | 1930 |
|---|---|---|---|---|---|---|---|
| Winter Olympic Games | 7th | | | | 14th | | |
| World Championships | | 4th | 3rd | | 6th | | |
| European Championships | | | | | | | 8th |
| British Championships | 4th | 2nd | 2nd | 1st | 3rd | 1st | 1st |
