= Andrew Seabrook =

British pair skater

Andrew Seabrook (born 22 June 1978 in Camberley) is a pair skater who has represented Great Britain. With partner Marsha Poluliaschenko, he was the gold medalist at the 1998 and 1999 British Figure Skating Championships. In 1998, they finished 10th at the European Figure Skating Championships and 13th at the World Figure Skating Championships. He later teamed with Tiffany Sfikas and the pair won the 2001 and 2002 British Championships. They also finished 10th at the European Championships in 2002.
