= Stephen Pickavance =

British figure skater

Figure skating career
- Country: United Kingdom
- Retired: 1986

Stephen Pickavance is a British former competitive figure skater. He won the British national title in 1985 and 1986. Pickavance appeared twice at the European Championships, placing 15th in 1985 and 18th in 1986. He also competed at the 1985 World Championships, finishing 21st.

Pickavance is a skating coach, listed as Level 4 by the National Ice Skating Association. He coached Steven Cousins and some of the contestants on Dancing on Ice. He was formerly married to Karen Barber, with whom he has two daughters, Laura and Emma.

== Competitive highlights ==
International
Event	1984	1985	1986
World Championships		21st	
European Championships		15th	18th
National
British Championships	3rd	1st	1st
