= Horatio Torromé =

Figure skater

Personal information
- Full name: Horatio Tertuliano Torromé
- Other names: Henri Torromé
- Born: 1861 Rio de Janeiro, Brazil
- Died: 16 September 1920 (aged 58–59) Willesden, Greater London

Figure skating career
- Country: Argentina; United Kingdom
- Skating club: Prince's Skating Club, GBR

Horatio Tertuliano Torromé (1861 – 16 September 1920), also credited as Henri Torromé, was a British figure skater who also competed for Argentina.

Torromé was born in Rio de Janeiro to an Argentine father and a Brazilian mother, and not long after his birth, the family emigrated to London, England. He took up ice skating at his local club, which was the Prince's Skating Club in Knightsbridge, London. Torromé competed at the 1902 World Figure Skating Championships in London, and he finished in fourth place out of four starters. In 1905 and 1906, he came first at the British Figure Skating Championships.

Although Torromé qualified to represent Great Britain at the 1908 Summer Olympics, he opted to compete for his father's home country and so became the only representative for Argentina at the 1908 Summer Olympics held in London. He scored 228.9 points in the men's individual competition, placing last of the seven skaters who finished competition. Torromé also served as a judge for the pairs competition at the same Games. He would continue to be an active judge and was a part of the judging team for the 1912 World Figure Skating Championships.

From 1881, Torromé was a partner in his father's Commissioned Merchants business in Laurence Pountney Lane, Candlewick, London. His father retired in 1903 and left the business to be run by Horatio and his brother Franco. Torromé was also known for being an artist.

Horatio Torromé died on 16 September 1920 in Willesden, London.

== Sources ==
- Cook, Theodore Andrea (1908). The Fourth Olympiad, Being the Official Report. London: British Olympic Association.
- De Wael, Herman (2001). "Gymnastics 1908". Herman's Full Olympians. Archived from the original on 23 February 2005.
