= Carolyn Krau =

British figure skater

Personal information
- Full name: Carolyn Patricia Krau
- Born: 18 August 1943 (age 82) Uxbridge, England

Figure skating career
- Country: United Kingdom
- Partner: Rodney Ward
- Retired: c. 1961

Carolyn Patricia Krau (born 18 August 1943) is a British former competitive figure skater. She competed in pair skating at the 1956 Winter Olympics and in ladies' singles at the 1960 Winter Olympics.

== Career ==
=== Pair skating ===
In the 1955–56 season, Krau and her partner, Rodney Ward, won the national junior pairs' title and finished second on the senior level at the British Championships. After placing 9th at the 1956 European Championships in Paris, they competed at the 1956 Winter Olympics in Cortina d'Ampezzo, where they finished 11th. They placed 9th at their final event of the season, the 1956 World Championships in Garmisch-Partenkirchen.

Krau/Ward ranked 13th at the 1958 European Championships in Bratislava and 12th at the 1958 World Championships in Paris.

=== Single skating ===
In December 1959, Krau became the national silver medalist in ladies' singles. She was named in the British team to the 1960 Winter Olympics in Squaw Valley, California, and finished 19th.

Krau won three silver medals at the Richmond Trophy. She placed 15th at the 1959 European Championships in Davos, 12th at the 1960 European Championships in Garmisch-Partenkirchen, and 20th at the 1960 World Championships in Vancouver.

== Competitive highlights ==
=== Ladies' singles ===
International
Event	1958–59	1959–60	1960–61
Winter Olympics		19th	
World Championships		20th	
European Championships	15th	12th	
Richmond Trophy	2nd	2nd	2nd
National
British Championships		2nd	

=== Pairs with Ward ===
International
Event	1955–56	1957–58
Winter Olympics	11th	
World Championships	9th	12th
European Championships	9th	13th
National
British Championships	2nd	
British Junior Champ.	1st	
