= Reginald Wilkie =

British ice dancer

Reginald Wilkie (died 6 August 1962) was a British ice dancer. With his partner Daphne Wallis, he was the British Ice Dance champion for many years, in the era before international competitions in this discipline were recognized by the International Skating Union. He and Wallis were the originators of the Paso Doble, Quickstep, and Argentine Tango compulsory dances. Wilkie served as chair of the ISU Dance Committee from 1953 until his death in 1962.

Wilkie was inducted into the World Figure Skating Hall of Fame at its establishment in 1976.
