= Gina Fulton =

British figure skater

Personal information
- Full name: Gina Fulton Carter
- Born: 13 February 1971 (age 55) Durham, North East England
- Height: 1.60 m (5 ft 3 in)

Figure skating career
- Country: Great Britain
- Retired: 1991

Gina Fulton Carter (born 13 February 1971) is a British former competitive figure skater in ladies' singles. She is the 1990 Piruetten silver medalist, a three-time British national medalist, and competed at the 1988 Winter Olympics in Calgary. Her best result at an ISU Championship was 12th at the 1987 European Championships in Sarajevo.

== Results ==
International
Event	1985–86	1986–87	1987–88	1988–89	1989–90	1990–91
Winter Olympics			23rd			
World Champ.			24th			
European Champ.		12th				
Piruetten						2nd
International: Junior
World Junior Champ.	7th	16th				
National
British Champ.		2nd	2nd		3rd	
