= Freddie Tomlins =

British figure skater

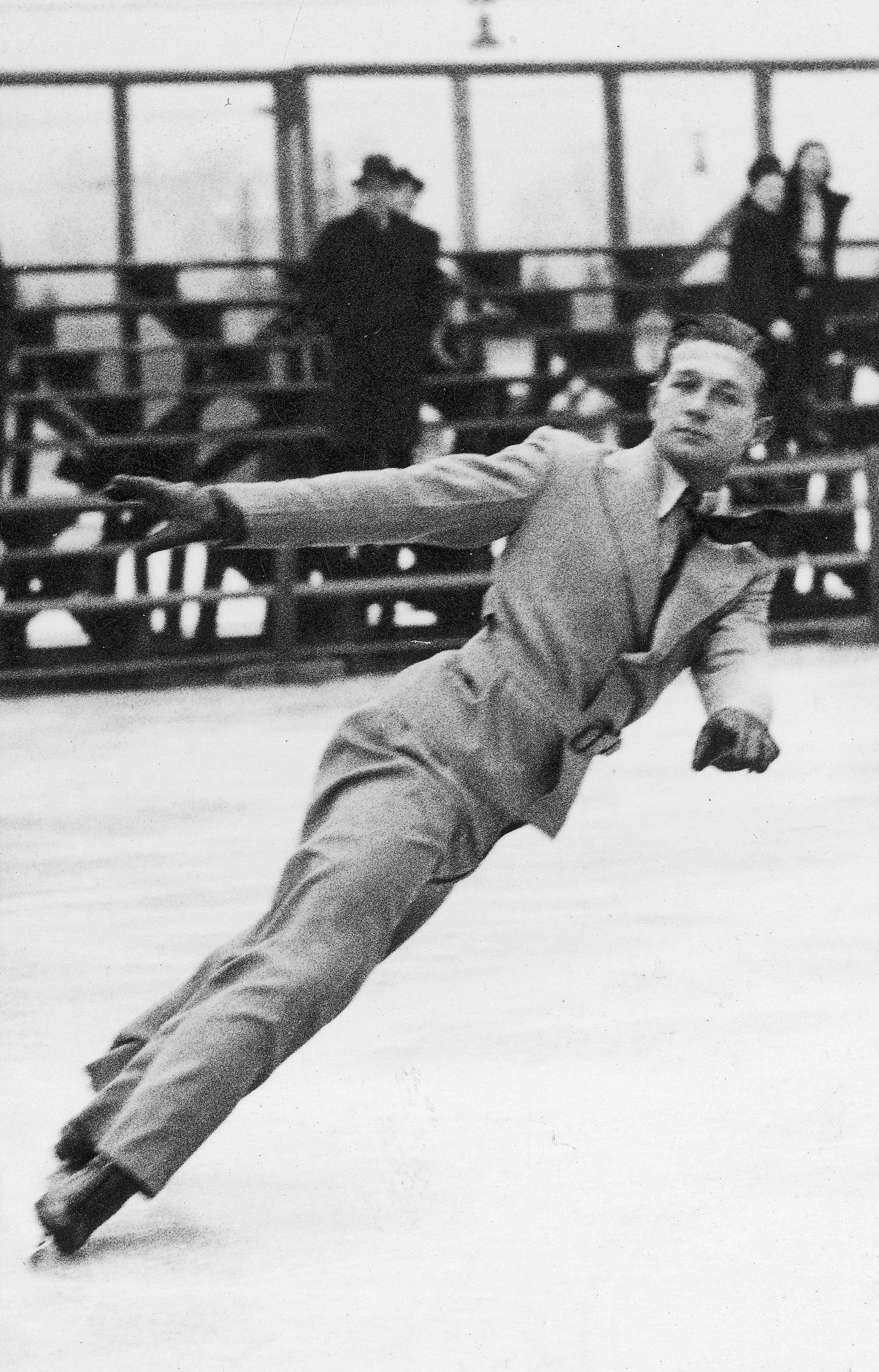
- Tomlins performing an inside edge spread eagle at the 1939 World Championships

Personal information
- Full name: Frederick William Edwin Tomlins
- Born: 5 August 1919 Lambeth, London, England
- Died: 20 June 1943 (aged 23) Bay of Biscay

Figure skating career
- Country: United Kingdom
Medal record
Representing United Kingdom
Men's Figure skating
World Championships
| Silver medal – second place | 1939 Budapest | Men's singles |
European Championships
| Silver medal – second place | 1939 London | Men's singles |

Frederick William Edwin Tomlins (5 August 1919 – 20 June 1943) was a British figure skater. He was the 1939 World silver medalist and European silver medalist. He competed at the 1936 Winter Olympics and placed 10th.

== Military service and death ==
Tomlins served as a pilot officer in the Royal Air Force Volunteer Reserve during the Second World War. On 20 June 1943, he took part in an anti-submarine mission aboard Armstrong Whitworth Whitley LA814 with Coastal Command. During the mission, the aircraft engaged a U-boat and was shot down in flames with all aboard killed. Tomlins is commemorated on the Runnymede Memorial.

== Results ==
| Event | 1935 | 1936 | 1937 | 1938 | 1939 |
|---|---|---|---|---|---|
| Winter Olympic Games | | 10th | | | |
| World Championships | | | 5th | 5th | 2nd |
| European Championships | | 8th | 4th | 6th | 2nd |
| British Championships | 3rd | 2nd | 2nd | 2nd | 2nd |
