= Christopher Howarth =

British figure skater (born 1960)

Personal information
- Born: 25 December 1960 (age 65)

Figure skating career
- Country: Great Britain

Christopher "Chris" Howarth (born 25 December 1960) is a British former competitive figure skater. He is the 1981 British national champion and competed at the 1980 Winter Olympics in Lake Placid, New York, where he placed 15th.

Howarth is a commentator for British Eurosport, as well as a skating coach and assistant general manager at the Glacier Ice Arena, in Vernon Hills, Illinois. He has also worked for the Dutch Figure Skating Association.

== Results ==
International
Event	1978–79	1979–80	1980–81	1981–82
Winter Olympics		15th		
World Champ.	20th		17th	
European Champ.	15th	15th	11th	
Schäfer Memorial		2nd		
Skate Canada				8th
National
British Champ.		2nd	1st	2nd
