= Proctor Burman =

English figure skater (1893–1974)

Personal information
- Born: Albert Proctor Burman; 10 March 1893 Manchester, England
- Died: 11 May 1974 (aged 81) Southport, England

Figure skating career
- Country: Great Britain

Albert Proctor Burman (10 March 1893 – 11 May 1974) was an English figure skater. He competed in two events at the 1928 Winter Olympics. He competed at the 1928 World Figure Skating Championships together with Kathleen Lovett, then on the 1933 European Figure Skating Championships together with his wife Gertrud Burman.
