= Paul Robinson (figure skater) =

British figure skater

Personal information
- Full name: Paul Vincent Robinson
- Born: 10 April 1965 (age 61) Blackpool, England
- Height: 1.75 m (5 ft 9 in)

Figure skating career
- Country: Great Britain
- Retired: 1988

Paul Robinson (born 10 April 1965) is a British former figure skater who competed in men's singles. He is a two-time British national champion (1987, 1988) and competed at two Winter Olympics, placing 22nd in 1984 and 18th in 1988. In 1988, he achieved his career-best result at the European Championships, ninth, and at the World Championships, 15th. He retired from competition in 1988 and went on to perform and produce his own shows alongside his Wife Viviane Robinson (Belgian figure skater) before becoming a coach.

== Competitive highlights ==
International
Event	81–82	82–83	83–84	84–85	85–86	86–87	87–88
Winter Olympics			22nd				18th
World Champ.			20th			17th	15th
European Champ.			15th		11th	11th	9th
Inter. de Paris							3rd
National
British Champ.	3rd	2nd	2nd	2nd	2nd	1st	1st
