= Mark Pepperday =

British figure skater and coach (born 1961)

Personal information
- Born: 15 March 1961 (age 65)

Figure skating career
- Country: United Kingdom
- Skating club: no affiliation
- Retired: 1984
Medal record
Representing Great Britain
World Junior Championships
Silver medal – second place	1977 Megève	Men

Mark Pepperday (born 15 March 1961) is a British figure skating coach and former competitor. He is the 1977 World Junior silver medalist. His highest placement at the European Championships was 14th, in 1981, and his highest placement at the World Championships was 20th, in 1983.

== Early life ==
He lived on 15 Mansfield Road in Selston, and attended the Matthew Holland Comprehensive School. His parents were Colin and Marlene. His cousin Michael Aldred, from Derwent Road in Kirkby-in-Ashfield, also ice skated with Catherine Barker in the mid-1980s.

== Career ==
After retiring from competition, Pepperday toured with Holiday on Ice for three and a half years and became a skating coach. He has been based at Bülacher Eislaufclub in Bülach, Switzerland. He has coached Sarah Meier, Moris Pfeifhofer, and Myriam Leuenberger, among others.

Mark Pepperday and Anita Pepperday-Siegfried have founded Pepperday's Pro Ice Skating in 2019 and offer ice skating trainings in Bülach, Switzerland and Dübendorf, Switzerland.

Currently he is training at the Eislaufclub, Küsnacht ECK in Küsnacht, Switzerland.

== Results ==
International
Event	76–77	78-79	80–81	81–82	82–83	83–84
World Champ.				21st	20th	
European Champ.			14th	16th	15th	
International: Junior
World Junior Champ.	2nd					
National
British Champ.		3rd	3rd	1st	1st	1st
