= Jean Scott (figure skater) =

British figure skater (1951-present)

Personal information
- Full name: Jean Atkinson Scott
- Born: 15 March 1951 (age 75)
- Height: 5 ft 3 in (160 cm)

Figure skating career
- Country: United Kingdom
- Retired: 1973
Medal record
Representing Great Britain
Ladies' Figure skating
European Championships
| Silver medal – second place | 1973 Cologne | Ladies' singles |

Jean Atkinson Scott (born 15 March 1951) is a British former figure skater from Scotland. She is the 1973 European silver medalist and a two-time British national champion (1971, 1973). She placed 11th at the 1972 Winter Olympics.

== Results ==
International
| Event | 1969–70 | 1970–71 | 1971–72 | 1972–73 | 1973–74 |
|---|---|---|---|---|---|
| Winter Olympics | | | 11th | | |
| World Championships | | 15th | 6th | 5th | |
| European Championships | | 11th | | 2nd | |
| Skate Canada | | | | | 3rd |
| Richmond Trophy | | | | 3rd | |
National
| British Championships | 3rd | 2nd | 1st | 2nd | 1st |
