= John Hamer (figure skater) =

English figure skater

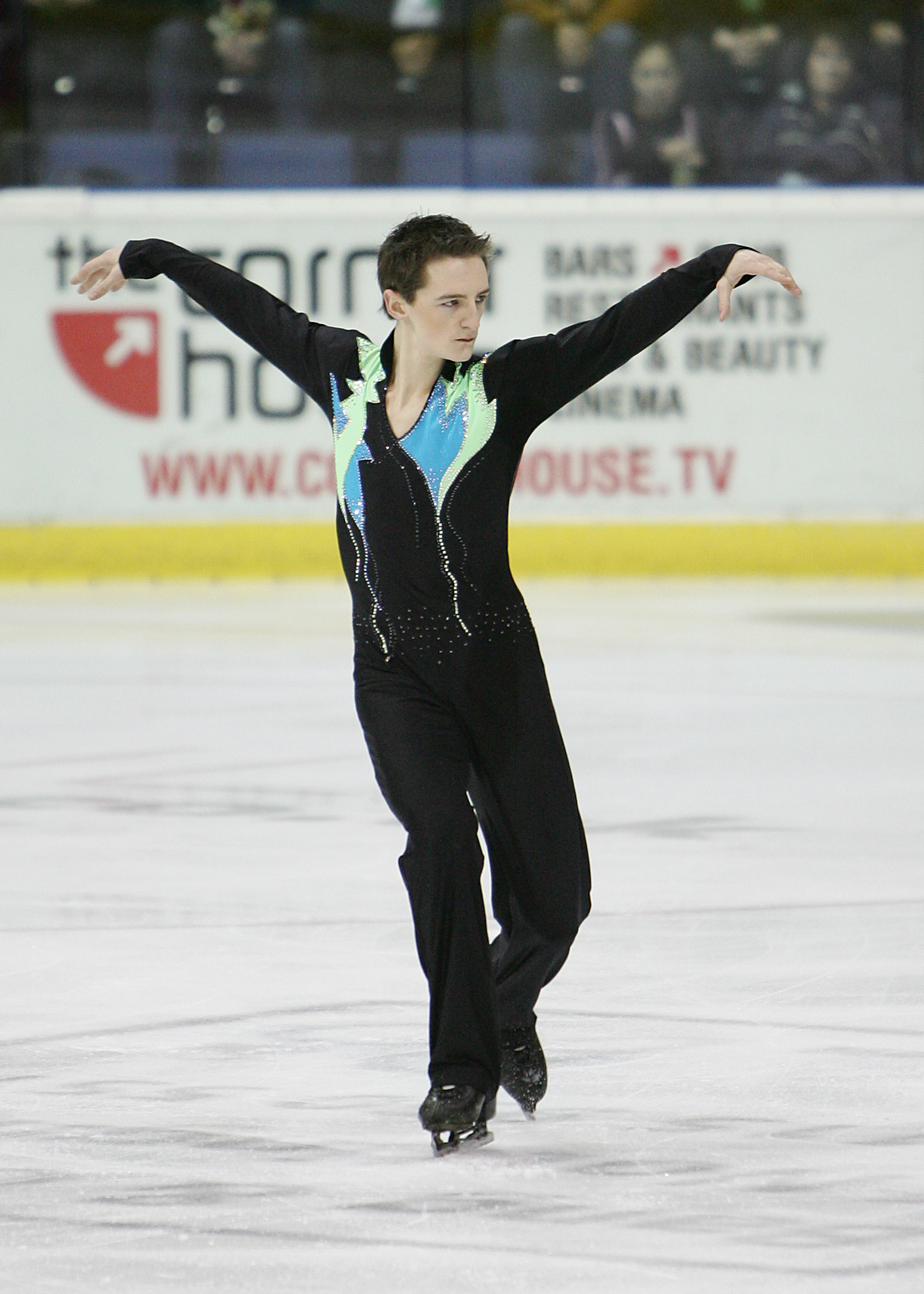

Personal information
- Born: 12 September 1984 (age 41) Gillingham, Kent, England
- Height: 1.75 m (5 ft 9 in)

Figure skating career
- Country: United Kingdom
- Coach: Gary Jones
- Skating club: Gillingham FSC Kent
- Began skating: 1995
- Retired: 2007

John William Hamer (born 12 September 1984) is an English former competitive figure skater. He is a three-time British national champion (2005–07). His best result at an ISU Championship was 19th at the 2005 European Championships.

== Career ==
=== Early years ===
Hamer started skating relatively late, at age 11. His mother, who had skated during childhood, chose the activity as part of her rehabilitation following a road traffic accident. Her son came with her to the Gillingham Ice rink and, after five weeks of group lessons, he signed up for private lessons with Gary Jones, who would coach him for his whole career.

=== Competitive career ===
Hamer began his competitive skating career in 1996 at the age of 12. He competed on the novice level at the 1999 British Championships and placed first on the junior level at the 2003 Championships. In 2001, Hamer appeared at the Mladost Trophy in Zagreb, Croatia and achieved the highest score among the British males. He went on to take part in two ISU Junior Grand Prix events.

In the 2004–05 season, Hamer became the British senior men's champion and was selected for the 2005 European Championships in Turin, Italy. Placing 20th in the short program, he qualified for the free skate and finished 19th overall. A month later, he travelled to Moscow for the 2005 World Championships but did not reach the free skate.

Hamer repeated as British champion during the next two seasons. He did not advance past the short program at the European and World Championships in 2006 but was successful at the 2007 European Championships in Warsaw, Poland. He retired from competition after the event. Although Gary Jones was his main coach, Hamer also worked with Michael Jiranek and Rinata Jiranek (2005), Tatiana Tarasova (2006), and Texas-based Lorraine Borman (2006).

=== Show and coaching career ===
After leaving competition, Hamer spent three years performing with the Russian Ice Stars. In February 2011, he began coaching at Alexandra Palace ice rink in North London. He teaches skaters of all ages and levels of experience and specialises in jumping.

== Programs ==
Season	Short program	Free skating
2006–07	Carmen Caprice	Furious Angels (from The Matrix Reloaded) by Rob Dougan
2005–06	King of the Forest by Edvin Marton	Backdraft by Hans Zimmer
2004–05	Chronologie II by Jean-Michel Jarre	Victory by Ronan Hardiman
2003–04	Ancient Land by Michael Nyman	Dragon: The Bruce Lee Story by Randy Edelman

== Competitive highlights ==
International
Event	2002–03	2003–04	2004–05	2005–06	2006–07
Worlds			29th	30th	
Europeans			19th	25th	21st
Golden Spin					4th
Nepela Memorial				7th	
Schäfer Memorial				10th	12th
International: Junior
JGP Poland		14th			
JGP Slovakia		13th			
Mladost Trophy	4th J.				
National
British Champ.	1st J.	9th	1st	1st	1st
J. = Junior level; JGP = Junior Grand Prix
