= Keiller Greig =

British figure skater (1881–1971)

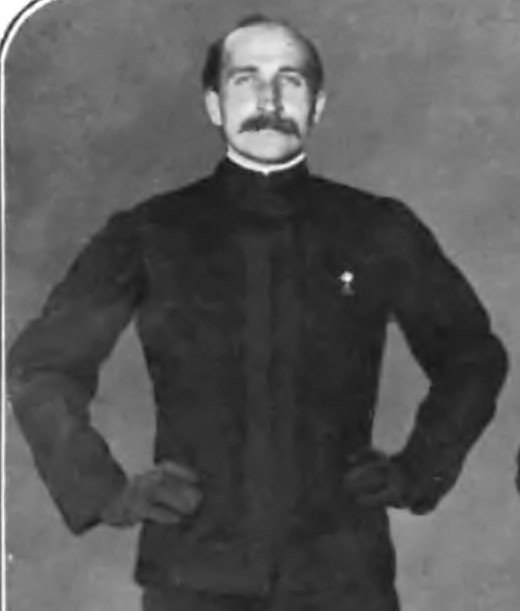
- Greig in 1910

Personal information
- Full name: John Keiller Greig
- Born: 12 June 1881 Dundee, Scotland
- Died: 1971 Ballater, Scotland

Figure skating career
- Country: United Kingdom
- Retired: 1910

John Keiller Greig (12 June 1881 – 1971) was a British figure skater who competed in men's singles. He was a three-time British national champion and was placed at fourth at the 1908 Summer Olympics.

== Early life ==
Greig was born in 1881 in Dundee. He was the son of a surgeon, and his older brother, David Middleton Greig, also became a surgeon.

== Career ==
Grieg won the bronze at the British Championships in 1905. The next year, he won silver, and the year after, 1907, he won his first national title. The next year, at the 1908 Summer Olympics, he placed 4th. The official Olympic report noted that while he skated the first compulsory figures well, during the loop figures, his position "was somewhat cramped". His free skating performance was said to be "skated powerfully and with plenty of élan," but he was criticized for lacking the grace shown by the Swedish competitors.

He won a further two British titles in 1909 and 1910. He also competed at the 1910 European Figure Skating Championships, where he placed 4th.

Contemporary T. D. Richardson praised Greig for his unique skating style, saying that he was "less influenced by Grenander than any of his contemporaries". He also recounted an occasion where Greig was to perform in a show in Samedan, located at an altitude of 1,700 metres (5,600 ft), and planned to take a week to acclimate to the altitude. However, he was delayed in leaving and had to take the train there on the day of the show; he went straight from the train to the rink and successfully performed his show number as well as an encore performance.

After finishing his competitive career, Greig became a judge for international figure skating competitions.

== Personal life ==
Greig was an estate factor for the Keiller family. He married Grace Margaret Turnbull Clapperton in 1915, and they had a daughter, Ann, who became a teacher. He died in 1971 in Ballater.

== Competitive highlights ==
International
Event	1907	1908	1909	1910
Summer Olympics		4th		
European Championships				4th
National
British Championships	1st		1st	1st
