= Karla Quinn =

British figure skater (born 1988)

Personal information
- Born: September 15, 1988 (age 37) Rasharkin, County Antrim, Northern Ireland, United Kingdom

Figure skating career
- Country: United Kingdom
- Coach: Margaret "Mags" O'Neill
Medal record
Representing the United Kingdom
Ladies' figure skating
Silver medal – second place	British Figure Skating Championships	2008

Karla Quinn (born 15 September 1988 in Rasharkin, County Antrim, Northern Ireland) is a British figure skater. She has been crowned as British Junior Ice Skating Champion 2008 British junior silver medallist and the 2006 British junior bronze medalist. She is the first female Irish skater to take three British titles at Novice, Primary and Junior levels.

Quinn began skating at the age of six under the tutelage of Margaret "Mags" O'Neill. Her choreographer is Mark Hanretty.

In 2003, she was awarded Britain's Brilliant Prodigy for Sport at an awards ceremony in London, presided over by The Duchess of York. In 2005 Quinn was struck down by illness, but, following an operation in November 2006, made her comeback to skating.

In the 2004–2005 season, Quinn competed at the Junior Grand Prix Harghita Cup, where she placed 12th in a field of 30. In the 2007–2008 season, she competed at the Junior Grand Prix John Curry Memorial, where she placed 25th in a field of 35. She was the 2003 Merano Cup bronze medalist on the junior level.

In 2007 local PR company AKR Promotions took over the promotion and publicity for Quinn.

== Schedule ==
Quinn is competing in her first Senior IJS Qualifier - Result - won gold medal and qualified for Senior Ladies. Quinn turned down an opportunity to take part in Celebrity Big Brother - Hijack in January 2008 due to the British Championships in January '08 - RESULT JUST IN QUINN TAKES BRITISH JUNIOR TITLE 10 JAN 2008.

Quinn came third in the British Senior Championships for the 2008–09 season.

Quinn was forced to withdraw from the British Championships in the 2009/10 season after her short programme because of injury.
