= Maria McLean =

British figure skater

Personal information
- Born: Edinburgh, Scotland, United Kingdom

Figure skating career
- Country: United Kingdom
- Retired: 1974

Maria McLean is a British former competitive figure skater. She is the 1973 British national champion. McLean competed at three European Championships, placing as high as sixth (1974), and at two World Championships, placing 11th in 1973 and 12th in 1974.

McLean is an ISU technical specialist. She is also a choreographer who has worked with Laura Lepistö, Jelena Glebova, and Jenni Vähämaa.

== Competitive highlights ==
International
Event	1971–72	1972–73	1973–74
World Championships		11th	12th
European Championships	8th	7th	6th
Richmond Trophy			2nd
National
British Championships	2nd	1st	2nd
