= Elliot Hilton =

British figure skater

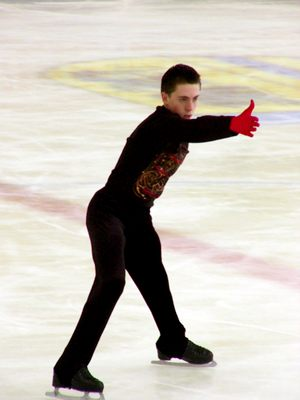
- Hilton in 2004

Personal information
- Born: 22 November 1989 (age 36) Preston, Lancashire, England

Figure skating career
- Country: United Kingdom
- Coach: Yuri Bureiko, Marina Serova, Gurgen Vardanjan
- Retired: 2010

Elliot Hilton (born 22 November 1989) is a British former figure skater. He is the 2008 British national champion. He qualified for the free skate at two ISU Championships – 2005 Junior Worlds in Kitchener, Ontario, where he finished 16th, and 2009 Europeans in Helsinki, where he finished 24th. He was coached by Yuri Bureiko.

== Programs ==
Season	Short program	Free skating
2008–09	Eastern	Broken Arrow by Hans Zimmer
2007–08	Requiem for a Dream by Clint Mansell	Once Upon a Time in Mexico by Robert Rodriguez
2004–05	The Mask of Zorro by James Horner	Xotica by René Dupéré

== Results ==
JGP: Junior Grand Prix

International
Event	03–04	04–05	05–06	07–08	08–09
Worlds				29th	30th
Europeans				26th	24th
Challenge Cup					8th
Golden Spin					10th
Ondrej Nepela					7th
International: Junior
Junior Worlds		16th		34th	
JGP Croatia			13th		
JGP France		9th			
JGP Germany		23rd			
JGP Poland			13th		
JGP Spain					17th
JGP U.K.				9th	15th
EYOF		8th			
Gardena	7th				
Merano Cup	2nd				
National
British Championships	3rd J.	1st J.		1st	5th
Belgian Championships				1st (Note: Guest skater)	
