= Malcolm Cannon =

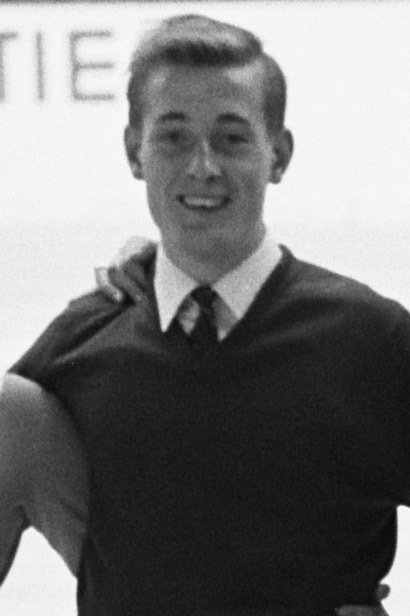
- Cannon in 1962
Medal record
Commonwealth Winter Games
Gold medal – first place	1962 St Moritz	Figure skating - men's singles

Malcolm Roger Cannon (born 22 June 1944 in Birmingham) is an English former ice skater. He won the gold medal in men's singles at the British Figure Skating Championships in 1963 and 1966 and finished 20th at the 1964 Winter Olympics.

Cannon also competed in ice dancing. With partner Yvonne Suddick, he won the silver medal at the European Figure Skating Championships in 1967 and 1968. They won the bronze at the World Figure Skating Championships in 1967 and the silver in 1968.

== Competitive highlights ==
Event	1967	1968
World Championships	3rd	2nd
European Championships	2nd	2nd
British Championships	2nd	2nd
