= David Clements (figure skater) =

British ice skater (born 1939)

Medal record

Figure Skating

Representing England

Commonwealth Winter Games
Silver medal – second place	1958 St Moritz	Figure skating - men's singles

David William Clements (born 8 August 1939 in Feltham) was a British ice skater who competed in men's singles. He won the gold medal at the 1959 British Figure Skating Championships and finished 15th at the 1960 Winter Olympics.
