= David Hartley (figure skater) =

British figure skater

Personal information
- Full name: David Hartley

Figure skating career
- Country: United Kingdom

David Hartley is a British figure skater. He is a three-time (2002, 2005, 2006) British bronze medalist. He works as a coach in Sheffield, was the British Ice Teachers Association's young coach of the year for 2009, works for British Ice Skating, and has produced numerous Christmas shows for the city.

== Competitive highlights ==
Event	2001-2002	2002-2003	2003-2004	2004-2005	2005-2006	2006-2007
British Championships	3rd	4th	6th	3rd	3rd	7th
Finlandia Trophy				13th		
Karl Schafer Memorial			12th			
