= Figure skating at the 1908 Summer Olympics – Men's singles =

Figure skating at the Olympics

Men's singles figure skating at the Games of the IV Olympiad
- Dates: 28–29 October 1908
- Competitors: 9 from 5 nations

Medalists
1st place, gold medalist(s)		Ulrich Salchow	Sweden
2nd place, silver medalist(s)		Richard Johansson	Sweden
3rd place, bronze medalist(s)		Per Thorén	Sweden

The men's singles was one of four events in figure skating at the 1908 Summer Olympics. Each nation could enter up to 3 skaters. Sweden's Ulrich Salchow, who had won several World Figure Skating Championships, easily won the gold medal after his main rival, Russia's Nikolai Panin, withdrew either in protest over what he considered unfair judging or due to illness.

== Competition format ==
Each skater had to complete a set of compulsory figures, with a possible score from those figures of 264. There were 7 figures, each of which had to completed in both directions (resulting in a total of 14 figures). Each figure was repeated three times. Marks were given for each figure from 0 to 6 (in half-point increments), then multiplied by a difficulty factor for that figure.

Each skater also performed a free skate of five minutes, with a score of up to 168. Scores from 0 to 6 were given for each of (a) content (difficulty and variety) and (b) performance. The total was multiplied by 14.

The maximum total possible score was therefore 432. Each judge would then arrange the skaters in order of total score by that judge; these ordinal rankings were used to provide final placement for the skaters, using a "majority rule"—if a majority of the judges ranked a pair first, the pair won. If there was no majority, the total ordinals controlled. Ties were broken by total points.

== Results ==
Three different skaters received a first-place rank from at least one judge: Thorén had one, Johansson had one, and Salchow had three. Because Salchow had a majority, he took the gold medal.

Johansson had a majority of the judges ranking him second or better, and took silver; similarly, Thorén had the majority of the third-place ranks and earned bronze. Greig took fourth, with no judge ranking him worse than that.

No majority was had for fifth-place, however, as the judges were split 2 for March, 2 for Brokaw, and 1 for Torromé. March had the fewest total ordinals (at 29, to Brokaw's 30 and Torromé's 31), so placed fifth.

Rank	Skaters	Nation	Points (Rank)					Average score	CF	FS	Total ordinals
Rank	Skaters	Nation	(Sweden) HG	(Sweden) EH	(Switzerland) GH	(Russian Empire) GS	(Germany) HW	Average score	CF	FS	Total ordinals
1st place, gold medalist(s)	Ulrich Salchow	Sweden	357 (1)	400 (1)	393 (2)	351 (2)	385.5 (1)	377.3	1	2	7
2nd place, silver medalist(s)	Richard Johansson	Sweden	336 (2)	396.5 (2)	381 (3)	353.5 (1)	359 (2)	365.2	4	1	10
3rd place, bronze medalist(s)	Per Thorén	Sweden	318 (4)	387.5 (3)	397 (1)	341 (3)	343.5 (3)	357.4	6	3	14
4	J. Keiller Greig	Great Britain	330 (3)	327.5 (4)	273 (4)	313 (4)	311 (4)	310.9	5	4	19
5	Albert March	Great Britain	224 (5)	257.5 (5)	208.5 (7)	228 (6)	242 (6)	232.0	6	7	29
6	Irving Brokaw	United States	207 (6)	246.5 (7)	240 (5)	266 (5)	241.5 (7)	240,2	8	5	30
7	Horatio Torromé	Argentina	197.5 (7)	247 (6)	231 (6)	220.5 (7)	248.5 (5)	228.9	7	6	31
–	Nikolai Panin	Russian Empire	Did not finish						2	–	–
–	Henry Yglesias	Great Britain	Did not finish						9	–	–

Referee:

- (United Kingdom) Herbert G. Fowler

Judges:

- (Sweden) Henning Grenander
- (Sweden) Edvard Hörle
- (Switzerland) Gustav Hügel
- (Russian Empire) Georg Sanders
- (Germany) Hermann Wendt

== Sources ==
- Cook, Theodore Andrea (1908). The Fourth Olympiad, Being the Official Report. London: British Olympic Association.
- De Wael, Herman. Herman's Full Olympians: "Figure skating 1908". Accessed 2 May 2006. Available electronically at.
