= Hywel Evans (figure skater) =

British figure skater

Personal information
- Full name: Lloyd Hywel Evans
- Born: 9 January 1945 (age 81) Rhondda, Wales, United Kingdom
- Height: 1.75 m (5 ft 9 in)

Figure skating career
- Country: United Kingdom
- Retired: 1965
Medal record
Commonwealth Winter Games
Silver medal – second place	1962 St Moritz	Figure skating - men's singles

Lloyd Hywel Evans (born 9 January 1945) is a British former competitive figure skater who competed in men's singles. He is a two-time British national champion (1964 and 1965) and finished 18th at the 1964 Winter Olympics.

== Results ==
International
Event	1963	1964	1965
Winter Olympics		18th	
World Championships		18th	20th
European Championships	18th	15th	15th
National
British Championships		1st	1st
