= Tammy Sear =

British former competitive figure skater (born 1977)

Tamsin Sear
Personal information
- Other names: Tamsin Sear-Watkins
- Born: 22 January 1977 (age 49) Oxford, England
- Height: 1.61 m (5 ft 3 1/2 in)

Figure skating career
- Country: United Kingdom
- Retired: 2002

Tamsin "Tammy" Sear (born 22 January 1977) is a British former competitive figure skater.

Sear is the first British female figure skater to land a triple lutz (completed at the 1998 British Championships) and the first to land a triple-triple jump combination at an Ondrej Nepela event.

== Career ==
Sear began skating in 1986 at the Oxford ice rink. Her coaches included Tony Barron, Rafael Arutyunyan, Evelyn Kramer, and Frank Carroll.

She is the 2000 British national champion in ladies' singles and was part of the British team sent to the 2000 European Championships in Vienna, Austria. She advanced to the free skate in that competition Sear also competed in 2000_World_Figure_Skating_Championships in Nice, France,

After retiring from competitive skating, Sear continued to perform in professional shows around the world as a principal soloist.

Sear coaches in the UK as Tamsin Sear-Watkins and is a UK Skating Level 4 performance coach and choreographer. She is married with two children. Sear coaches her daughter Arabella Sear-Watkins, who won the 2019 British Advanced Novice championship title and who has competed internationally in the 2021-22 2022–23_ISU_Junior_Grand_Prix series and 2023-2024 JGP

== Competitive highlights ==
International
Event	93–94	94–95	97–98	98–99	99–00	00–01	01–02
World Champ.					37th		
European Champ.					23rd		
Czech Skate		9th					
Nepela Memorial							7th
International: Junior
Blue Swords	16th J						
Gardena	12th J						
National
British Champ.			3rd	2nd	1st	3rd	4th
J = Junior level
