= Susy Garland =

British figure skater

Personal information
- Nationality: British
- Born: 30 April 1966 Bristol, England
- Died: 10 April 1987 (aged 20)

Sport
- Sport: Figure skating

Susy Garland (30 April 1966 – 10 April 1987) was a British figure skater who competed in pairs. With partner Robert Daw, she won the gold medal three timeas at the British Figure Skating Championships. She and Daw competed at the 1980 Winter Olympics, finishing tenth.

Garland later competed with Ian Jenkins, with whom she won three more British championships. They finished fourteenth at the 1984 Winter Olympics. She died in a car crash in 1987, along with her boyfriend.
