= Clive Shorten =

English figure skater

Personal information
- Born: 28 June 1973 (age 53) London, England
- Height: 1.72 m (5 ft 7 1/2 in)

Figure skating career
- Country: United Kingdom
- Skating club: Riverside SC
- Began skating: 1982
- Retired: 1999

Clive Shorten (born 28 June 1973) is an English former competitive figure skater. He is the 1992 Piruetten bronze medalist, 1994 Czech Skate silver medalist, and 1999 British national champion. He reached the free skate at three ISU Championships as a single skater.

== Career ==
=== Single skating ===
Shorten began skating in 1982. He placed 21st at the 1991 World Junior Championships in Budapest, just missing the cut-off for the free skate. At the 1992 World Junior Championships in Hull, Quebec, he qualified for the final segment and finished 19th. Shorten won bronze at the 1992 Piruetten and silver at the 1994 Czech Skate. He was 19th overall at the 1995 World Championships in Birmingham, England, after placing 22nd in the short and 18th in the free.

Shorten's first coaches were David Clements and Ludmila Vasilyeva. In the 1998–99 season, he won the British national title, coached by Viktor Teslia at the Chelmsford Riverside Ice Centre. Shorten reached the free skate at the 1999 European Championships in Prague, where he finished 24th, but not at the 1999 World Championships.

=== Pair skating ===
Shorten competed internationally in pair skating with Victoria Pearce. They placed 14th at the 1991 World Junior Championships in Budapest, 8th at the 1992 World Junior Championships in Hull, Quebec, and 13th at the 1993 European Championships in Helsinki.

=== Post-competitive career ===
Shorten later became a coach, working at Alexandra Palace until 2004. In January 2005, he was appointed head coach at Riverside Ice and Leisure Centre in Chelmsford. In July 2005, Shorten moved to Cornwall and took up a new career in carpentry, but continued to coach ice skating in Plymouth.

Shorten has featured in several television advertisements and was Robbie Williams' skating body double in his She's the One video.

== Competitive highlights ==
=== Single skating ===
International
Event	90–91	91–92	92–93	93–94	94–95	96–97	97–98	98–99
World Champ.					19th			31st
European Champ.								24th
Czech Skate					2nd			
Nebelhorn Trophy								13th
Piruetten			3rd					
Schäfer Memorial								8th
St. Gervais					4th			
International: Junior
Junior Worlds	21st	19th						
National
British Champ.				4th	2nd	3rd	3rd	1st

=== Pair skating with Pearce ===
International
Event	1990–91	1991–92	1992–93
European Champ.			13th
World Junior Champ.	14th	8th	
