= Ian Jenkins (figure skater) =

British figure skater

Personal information
- Nationality: British
- Born: 18 May 1962 (age 63) Bristol, England

Sport
- Sport: Figure skating

Ian Jenkins (born 18 May 1962) is a British figure skater. With partner Susan Garland, he captured the pairs gold medal at the British Figure Skating Championships three times. They competed in the pairs event at the 1984 Winter Olympics, finishing fourteenth.
