= Gary Shortland =

English figure skater (born 1976)

Gary John Shortland (born 4 March 1976 in Frimley Green, Surrey, England) is a professional ice skating coach, owner and founder of Apta Fitted. As an eligible skater, he competed with partner Charlotte Clements at the World Figure Skating Championships, the European Figure Skating Championships, and many other international events. They were Four-time(1993),(1995), (1997 & 1998) British national champions European, and world competitors. Gary currently resides in Charlotte, North Carolina and specializes in coaching Ice Dance, Choreography, Power and Edge.
