= Charlotte Clements =

English ice dancer (born 1979)

Charlotte Clements (born 28 October 1979 in London) is an English ice dancer. With partner Gary Shortland, she captured the gold medal at the British Ice Figure and Dance Championships in 1997 and again in 1998. She later teamed up with Phillip Poole and won the bronze medal at the 2002 national championships. She now coaches at Queens Ice Rink in Bayswater.
