= Robert Daw =

British figure skater

Personal information
- Nationality: British
- Born: 6 February 1964 (age 62) Bristol, England

Sport
- Sport: Figure skating

Robert Daw (born 6 January 1964) is a British/American figure skater. With partner Susy Garland, he captured the pairs title three times at the British Figure Skating Championships. They competed at the 1980 Winter Olympics, finishing tenth.

After his partnership with Garland ended, Daw came to the United States and paired with Gillian Wachsman. They twice finished fourth at the United States Figure Skating Championships. He later competed with partner Karen Courtland. After about a decade away from competition, he switched disciplines to ice dance, finishing eleventh at the 1996 United States Figure Skating Championships with Kimberly Callahan
