= Linda Shearman =

British former competitive ice dancer

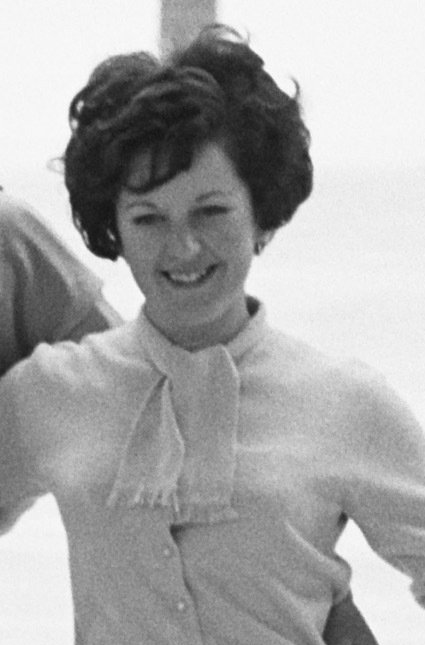
- Shearman in 1962

Figure skating career
- Country: Great Britain
- Retired: 1963
Medal record
Figure skating: Ice dancing
Representing Great Britain
World Championships
Silver medal – second place	1963 Cortina d'Ampezzo	Ice dancing
European Championships
Gold medal – first place	1963 Budapest	Ice dancing
Silver medal – second place	1962 Geneva	Ice dancing
Bronze medal – third place	1961 West Berlin	Ice dancing

Linda Shearman is a British former competitive ice dancer. With partner Michael Phillips, she became the 1963 European champion and 1963 World silver medalist.

== Results ==
(with Michael Phillips)

International
Event	1961	1962	1963
World Championships		4th	2nd
European Championships	3rd	2nd	1st
National
British Championships		1st	1st
