= Neil Wilson (figure skater) =

British figure skater

Personal information
- Born: 26 June 1978 (age 48) Belfast, Northern Ireland
- Height: 1.75 m (5 ft 9 in)

Figure skating career
- Country: United Kingdom
- Began skating: 1986
- Retired: 2004

Neil Wilson (born 26 June 1978) is a British former competitive figure skater. He is a three-time British national champion in men's singles (1997, 2000, and 2003) and reached the free skate at nine ISU Championships – two World Championships, four European Championships, and three World Junior Championships.

== Career ==
Wilson began skating at age eight after a rink opened near his home. He competed at three World Junior Championships, achieving his best result, sixth, in 1997 in Seoul, South Korea. He also competed at four World Championships – best result: 20th at the 1996 Worlds in Edmonton, Alberta — and four European Championships, obtaining his best result, 13th, at the 1999 Europeans in Prague, Czech Republic. Wilson defeated Steven Cousins to win the 1997 British Championships, held in November 1996. He would go on to win two more senior national titles.

In 1997, Wilson entered the Guinness Book of World Records for the most rotations in an upright spin — he performed a forward scratch spin with 60 uninterrupted rotations. His coaches included Philip and Sue Walsh and then Kevin Bursey in Ayr, Scotland. In June 2001, he moved to Vancouver, British Columbia, where his coach became Joanne McLeod.

Wilson retired from competition after the 2004 World Championships in Dortmund. He became a figure skating coach and choreographer at the BC Center of Excellence in Burnaby, British Columbia. He has worked with Kevin Reynolds, Jeremy Ten, and Kelsey Wong.

== Programmes ==
Season	Short programme	Free skating
2002–2003	Quixote by Magnus Fiennes performed by Bond	Concerto for Violin and Orchestra in E Minor by Julius Conus performed by the Russian National Orchestra
2000–2001	Sikuriadas by Incantation	Piano Concerto No. 3 by Sergei Rachmaninoff (from Shine)

== Competitive highlights ==
GP: Champions Series/Grand Prix

International
Event	93–94	94–95	95–96	96–97	97–98	98–99	99–00	00–01	01–02	02–03	03–04
Worlds			20th			33rd		26th			23rd
Europeans			16th	15th		13th				14th	
GP Skate Canada					9th		11th				
Finlandia Trophy								13th		8th	
Golden Spin											5th
Nebelhorn Trophy							9th				
Skate Israel						13th					
International: Junior
Junior Worlds		12th	10th	6th							
Blue Swords		8th J.	5th J.								
EYOF		8th J.									
National
British Champ.	1st J.	5th	2nd	1st	2nd		1st	2nd		1st	2nd
J. = Junior level
