= Nelli Chervotkina =

Soviet pair skater

Personal information
- Native name: Нелли Алексеевна Червоткина Пылькина
- Full name: Nelli Alexeyevna Chervotkina
- Other names: Nelli Pylkina
- Born: 24 May 1965 (age 61)

Figure skating career
- Country: Soviet Union
- Partner: Viktor Teslia
- Coach: Ludmila Velikova; Aleksandr Vlasov
- Retired: 1983

Nelli Alexeyevna Chervotkina, later surname Pylkina (Russian: Нелли Алексеевна Червоткина Пылькина) is a former pair skater for the Soviet Union. With Viktor Teslia, she is the 1979 Prague Skate champion, 1982 Skate America bronze medalist, and 1983 Winter Universiade champion. Their coaches were Ludmila Velikova and Aleksandr Vlasov.

Pylkina coaches skating in Sweden. She was based in Lidköping and Linköping before moving to the Stockholm region.

In August 1990, she gave birth in Saint Petersburg to her daughter Angelika Pylkina, who would become a pair skater for Sweden.

== Competitive highlights ==
With Teslia

International
Event	78–79	79–80	80–81	81–82	82–83
Prague Skate	3rd	1st			
Prize of Moscow News	2nd		2nd		
Skate America					3rd
St. Gervais			1st		
Winter Universiade					1st
National
Soviet Championships	5th		5th		6th
