= Yvonne Suddick =

Personal information
- Born: c.1945

Figure skating career
- Country: Great Britain
Medal record
Representing Great Britain
Figure skating: Ice dancing
World Championships
Silver medal – second place	1968 Geneva	Ice dancing
Bronze medal – third place	1967 Vienna	Ice dancing
European Championships
Silver medal – second place	1966 Bratislava	Ice dancing
Silver medal – second place	1967 Ljubljana	Ice dancing
Silver medal – second place	1968 Västerås	Ice dancing
Bronze medal – third place	1964 Grenoble	Ice dancing
Bronze medal – third place	1965 Moscow	Ice dancing

Yvonne Suddick is a British figure skater who competed in ice dance.

With partner Malcolm Cannon, Suddick won the bronze medal at the 1967 World Figure Skating Championships and the silver medal at the 1968 World Figure Skating Championships.

== Competitive highlights ==
With Roger Kennerson

Event	1964	1965	1966
World Championships	4th	6th	4th
European Championships	3rd	3rd	2nd
British Championships		2nd	2nd

With Malcolm Cannon

Event	1967	1968
World Championships	3rd	2nd
European Championships	2nd	2nd
British Championships	2nd	2nd
