= Erika Taylforth =

Pair skater

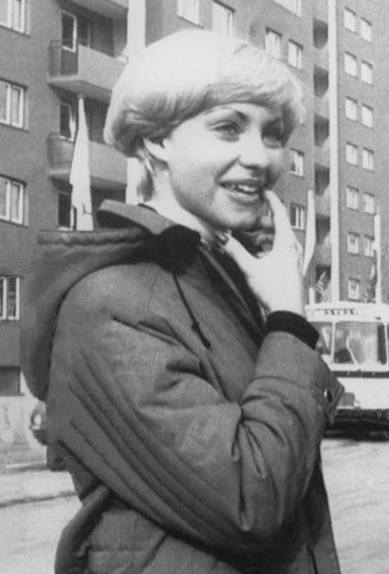
- Taylforth at the 1976 Olympics

Personal information
- Born: November 22, 1956 (age 69) Encino, California, U.S.

Sport
- Sport: Figure skating

Erika Leslie Taylforth (formerly Kessler or Susman, later Shorr; born November 22, 1956) is a retired pair skater who represented both the United States and Great Britain. With partner Thomas Huff, she won the bronze medal at the United States Figure Skating Championships in 1974. She later married partner Colin Taylforth and skated for Britain with him. They won the gold medal at the 1976 British Figure Skating Championships, finished 11th at the European Figure Skating Championships in 1976, and then came in 11th at the 1976 Winter Olympics.

Susman and Taylforth later divorced.
