= Karen Wood =

Personal information
- Died: December 2014

Figure skating career
- Country: United Kingdom
- Retired: 1985

Karen Wood was a British competitive figure skater. She is the 1980 Richmond Trophy champion and a two-time British national champion (1981, 1983) in ladies' singles.

== Career ==
Karen Wood trained in Whitley Bay, Billingham, Durham, and Deeside North Wales, passing her first test in 1971.

In 1976, Wood competed in pair skating with Stephen Baker at the World Junior Championships The pair was coached by Alan Merchant.

As a single skater, Wood placed 15th at the 1981 World Championships and 8th at the 1982 European Championships. After she withdrew from the 1983 European Championships, the National Ice Skating Association decided to remove her from the team to the World Championships, giving the spot to Alison Southwood.

== Personal life ==
Wood had two daughters, Corrinne and Nicole. She died in December 2014 after a prolonged illness.

== Competitive highlights ==
=== Single skating ===
International
Event	1980–81	1981–82	1982–83	1983–84	1984–85
World Champ.	15th	17th			
European Champ.	11th	8th	WD		
Skate Canada		7th			
St. Ivel		3rd			
Richmond Trophy	1st				
National
British Champ.	1st	2nd	1st	3rd	2nd
WD = Withdrew

=== Pair skating ===
International
Event	1976
World Junior Championships	6th
