= Tiffany Sfikas =

American figure skater (born 1977)

Tiffany Ann Sfikas (born April 8, 1977 in Chicago) is a pair skater who has represented the United States and Great Britain. After competing as a junior with Josiah Modes, she teamed with Bert Cording and finished tenth at the 1999 United States Figure Skating Championships. She then moved to the U.K., where she joined forces with Andrew Seabrook. The duo went on to win the gold medal at the British Figure Skating Championships twice and finished tenth at the European Figure Skating Championships in 2002. After that partnership ended, she briefly skated with Michael Aldred before returning to the U.S. and skating with Jeffrey Weiss. That pair finished 14th at the 2004 United States Figure Skating Championships.
