= Frances Waghorn =

Personal information
- Full name: Frances Muriel Wells Waghorn
- Other names: Frances Robinson
- Born: 5 June 1950 Hitcham, Surrey, England
- Died: 5 January 1994 (aged 43) Tadworth, Surrey, England
- Height: 1.67 m (5 ft 5 1/2 in)

Figure skating career
- Country: United Kingdom

Frances Muriel T. Waghorn or Robinson (5 June 1950 – January 1994) was an English figure skater who competed at the 1968 Winter Olympics in Grenoble, France. She also appeared at the 1970 World Championships and three European Championships, achieving her best result, 13th, at the 1970 Europeans in Leningrad, Soviet Union.

After retiring from amateur competition, Waghorn performed in Jack and the Beanstalk on Ice (1971) and competed at the 1976 World Professional Championships in Jaca.

== Competitive highlights ==
International
Event	1968	1969	1970	1976
Winter Olympics	24th			
World Championships			18th	
European Championships	16th	17th	13th	
World Professional Champ. (Jaca)				10th
National
British Championships			2nd	
