= Henry Yglesias =

British figure skater

Personal information
- Nationality: British
- Born: 14 May 1867; Brighton, England
- Died: 20 August 1949 (aged 82); Wandsworth, England

Sport
- Sport: Figure skating

Henry Yglesias (14 May 1867 – 20 August 1949) was a British figure skater. He competed in the men's singles event at the 1908 Summer Olympics.

Along with fellow skater Edgar Syers, Yglesias lobbied for the adoption of the international style of skating to become the standard in England. They requested that the International Skating Union hold the third edition of the World Championships in London in 1898.

Yglesias was part of the National Skating Association for more than 40 years, becoming a leading judge in skating. He also became a solicitor, and was a partner in the firm Lewis & Yglesias. For the 1908 Summer Olympics, he was part of the organization of the skating events. In 1914, he wrote the book Figure Skating.
