= Jacqueline Harbord =

British former competitive figure skater (born 1944)

Personal information
- Full name: Jacqueline Renee Harbord
- Born: 1944 Lambeth, London

Figure skating career
- Country: United Kingdom
Medal record
Commonwealth Winter Games
Gold medal – first place	1962 St Moritz	Figure Skating - Women's Singles

Jacqueline Renee Harbord (born 1944) is a British former competitive figure skater. She is the 1962 British national champion and placed seventh at the 1963 European Championships. Harbord, from Brixton, turned professional later in 1963. She trained in Streatham.

== Competitive highlights ==
International
Event	1961–62	1962–63
World Championships	11th	
European Championships	9th	7th
National
British Championships	1st	2nd
