= Lana Bagen =

British figure skater

Personal information
- Born: 9 July 1996 (age 30) Hamilton, Scotland
- Home town: Livingston, Scotland

Figure skating career
- Country: Great Britain
- Skating club: Magnum
- Began skating: 2005

Lana Bagen (born 9 July 1996) is a British figure skater. She was the 2013 British Junior Champion and 2011 British Novice Champion.

== Career ==
Lana began skating at the age of 8 at Olympia Skating Club in East Kilbride. In 2008, she was selected for the Great Britain Development Team. She has held the Scottish national title 6 times at various levels.

=== 2009–10 Season ===
Lana won the silver medal in the novice category at the British Championships.

=== 2010–11 Season ===
Lana won the gold medal in the British Novice Championships.

=== 2011–12 Season ===
During the summer of 2011, Lana trained under renowned coach Michael Huth, the coach of world champion, Carolina Kostner. Lana did not medal on a national level that season, but she competed internationally, winning the Barcelona open, in Barcelona, Spain, competing in Skate Copenhagen 2012 and winning 4 silver medals at various events including ones in Sweden and Slovakia. She was selected to compete in the ISU Junior Grand Prix that season, being held in Austria. in 2011. Lana was shortlisted for the Sunday Mail's Young Sportsperson of the Year award.

=== 2012–13 Season ===
Lana won the gold medal in the British Junior Championships, qualifying her for international competition. She placed 6th Junior in the 2013 Santa Claus Cup and competed in her second Junior Grand Prix, gaining personal best scores at ISU JGP Czech Skate 2013. In May 2013, she skated in the ice show Professionals on Ice on their four dates in Edinburgh.

=== 2013–14 Season ===
Lana again competed on the international circuit, finishing 3rd in the New Year Cup in Bratislava, 12th in the 2014 Lombardia Trophy, 7th in the Tirnava Edea Ice Cup, 4th in the Mentor Nestle Turon Cup, 12th in the Junior International Challenge cup in The Hague and 10th in the 2014 Santa Claus Cup.

=== 2014–15 Season ===
Lana earned her way back on to the podium at the British Junior National Championships with a bronze medal finish. She then competed in the 2015 Sportland Trophy in Budapest, finishing 10th.

=== 2015–16 Season ===
Lana earned a silver medal at the British Championships at Junior level.

== Programs ==
Season	Short program	Free skating
2014–2015	Send In the Clowns	Immortal by Lindsey Stirling
