= Catherine Morris =

British figure skater (1928–2023)

Personal information
- Born: 10 May 1928
- Died: 22 April 2023 (aged 94)
- Home town: Nottingham, England

Figure skating career
- Country: Great Britain
Medal record
Representing Great Britain
Figure skating: Ice dance
European Championships
Silver medal – second place	1958 Bratislava	Ice dance
Silver medal – second place	1959 Davos	Ice dance
Bronze medal – third place	1957 Vienna	Ice dance

Catherine "Kay" Morris Robinson (10 May 1928 – 22 April 2023) was a British figure skater who competed in ice dance.

With her partner, Michael Robinson, she won bronze at the 1957 European Figure Skating Championships and silver at the 1958 and 1959 European Figure Skating Championships.

== Competitive highlights ==
With Michael Robinson

Event	1957	1958	1959
World Championships	6th	4th	7th
European Championships	3rd	2nd	2nd
