= Madeleine Beaumont =

British figure skater

Personal information
- Born: 24 August 1883 Liverpool, England
- Died: 26 August 1975 (aged 92) Kensington, England

Sport
- Sport: Figure skating

Madeleine Beaumont (24 August 1883 – 26 August 1975) was a British figure skater. She competed in the pairs event at the 1920 Summer Olympics.
