= Sarah Kemp (figure skater) =

Sarah Kemp (born 4 January 1983) is an English pair skater who represented Great Britain from 1999 to 2001 with partner Daniel Thomas.

The pair competed in the British Figure Skating Championships twice, winning gold in 1999 and silver in 2000. The pair also competed in the European Figure Skating Championships and the Nebelhorn Trophy in 2000. Kemp began skating at the age of four. She teamed up with Thomas in 1998. Kemp was a cast member in the Hot Ice Show in 2001 and 2002.
