= Linda Connolly =

British pair skater

Linda Connolly, Ormskirk, Lancs (born 30 April 1952) is a former pair skater who represented Great Britain. With partner Colin Taylforth, she finished 9th at the 1971 European Figure Skating Championships and 14th at the 1972 Winter Olympics.

Linda Connolly won the British pairs' championship 3 times, first in 1965 at the age of 13, and then in 1970 & 1971 before going on to compete in the European & Olympic championships.
