= Colin Taylforth =

British pair skater

Colin Taylforth (born 16 September 1953 in Liverpool) is a former pair skater who represented Great Britain. With partner Linda Connolly, he finished 14th at the 1972 Winter Olympics. He later married Erika Susman and began an on-ice partnership with his new wife. They finished 11th at the 1976 Winter Olympics.

Taylforth and Susman later divorced.
