= John Jenkins (figure skater) =

British figure skater

Personal information
- Nationality: British
- Born: 24 July 1970 (age 54); Nairobi, Kenya

Sport
- Sport: Figure skating

John Jenkins (born 24 July 1970) is a British figure skater. He competed in the pairs event at the 1994 Winter Olympics.
