= Kathleen Lovett =

English figure skater

- Born: Kathleen Marion Lovett-Whyatt; 30 November 1898; Trafford, England
- Died: 1969 (aged 70–71); Manchester, England

Figure skating career
- Country: Great Britain

Kathleen Marion Whyatt, née Lovett (30 November 1898 – 1969) was an English figure skater. She competed in the mixed pairs event at the 1928 Winter Olympics.
