= Kathryn Pritchard =

British figure skater

Personal information
- Nationality: British
- Born: 14 September 1972 (age 52); Scarborough, England

Sport
- Sport: Figure skating

Kathryn Pritchard (born 14 September 1972) is a British figure skater. She competed in the pairs event at the 1992 Winter Olympics.
