= List of figure skaters (ice dance) =

The following is a list of notable figure skaters who have competed in ice dance. These are skaters who have won a gold, silver, or bronze medal at at least one of the following competitions: the Winter Olympics, the World Figure Skating Championships, the European Figure Skating Championships, the Four Continents Figure Skating Championships, the Grand Prix of Figure Skating Final, the Winter Youth Olympics, the World Junior Figure Skating Championships, or the Junior Grand Prix Final; or who have won a gold medal at their national championships.

Skater	Nation	Partner(s)	Major championships	Ref.
Margie Ackles	United States	Charles Phillips	(gold) U.S. Championships (1960)	
Donald Adair	United States	Renée Roca	(gold) U.S. Championships (1986)	
Alisa Agafonova	Turkey	Alper Uçar	(gold) Turkish Championships (2018)	
Benjamin Agosto	United States	Tanith Belbin	(gold) Four Continents Championships (2004–06); U.S. Championships (2004–08); World Junior Championships (2002); Junior Grand Prix Final (2000)	
Benjamin Agosto	United States	Tanith Belbin	(silver) Winter Olympics (2006); World Championships (2005, 2009); Four Continents Championships (2002–03, 2007); Grand Prix Final (2004, 2007); World Junior Championships (2001)	
Benjamin Agosto	United States	Tanith Belbin	(bronze) World Championships (2006–07); Grand Prix Final (2003); World Junior Championships (2000)	
Olga Akimova	Uzbekistan	Andrei Driganov; Alexander Shakalov	(gold) Uzbekistani Championships (1999–2001, 2004–05)	
Alexandra Aldridge	United States	Daniel Eaton	(bronze) Four Continents Championships (2014); World Junior Championships (2012–13); Junior Grand Prix Final (2012)	
Kirill Aleshin	Russia	Anastasia Skoptsova	(gold) Winter Youth Olympics (2016); World Junior Championships (2018); Junior Grand Prix Final (2017)	
Kirill Aleshin	Russia	Anastasia Skoptsova	(bronze) Winter Youth Olympics (2016)	
Saulius Ambrulevičius	Lithuania	Allison Reed; Taylor Tran	(gold) Lithuanian Championships (2016–22)	
Saulius Ambrulevičius	Lithuania	Allison Reed; Taylor Tran	(bronze) European Championships (2024)	
Andree Anderson	United States	Donald Jacoby	(gold) U.S. Championships (1958–59)	
Andree Anderson	United States	Donald Jacoby	(silver) World Championships (1959)	
Andree Anderson	United States	Donald Jacoby	(bronze) World Championships (1958)	
Marina Anissina	Soviet Union	Ilia Averbukh	(gold) World Junior Championships (1990, 1992)	
Marina Anissina	France	Gwendal Peizerat	(gold) Winter Olympics (2002); World Championships (2000); European Championships (2000, 2002); Grand Prix Final (1999); French Championships (1996–2001)	
Marina Anissina	France	Gwendal Peizerat	(silver) World Championships (1998–99, 2001); European Championships (1999, 2001); Grand Prix Final (1998, 2001)	
Marina Anissina	France	Gwendal Peizerat	(bronze) Winter Olympics (1998); European Championships (1998); Grand Prix Final (1995–97)	
Natalia Annenko	Soviet Union	Vadim Karkachev; Genrikh Sretenski	(gold) World Junior Championships (1982)	
Natalia Annenko	Soviet Union	Vadim Karkachev; Genrikh Sretenski	(silver) European Championships (1988); World Junior Championships (1981)	
Natalia Annenko	Soviet Union	Vadim Karkachev; Genrikh Sretenski	(bronze) European Championships (1986–87, 1989)	
Rie Arikawa	Japan	Kenji Miyamoto	(gold) Japan Championships (2002–03)	
Philip Askew	Great Britain	Marika Humphreys	(gold) British Championships (1996–97)	
Ilia Averbukh	Soviet Union	Marina Anissina	(gold) World Junior Championships (1990, 1992)	
Ilia Averbukh	Russia	Irina Lobacheva	(gold) World Championships (2002); European Championships (2003); Grand Prix Final (2002); Russian Championships (1997, 2000–02)	
Ilia Averbukh	Russia	Irina Lobacheva	(silver) Winter Olympics (2002); World Championships (2003); Grand Prix Final (2000)	
Ilia Averbukh	Russia	Irina Lobacheva	(bronze) World Championships (2001); European Championships (1999, 2001–02); Grand Prix Final (1998)	
Jitka Babická	Czechoslovakia	Jaromír Holan	(gold) Czechoslovak Championships (1966–67)	
Jitka Babická	Czechoslovakia	Jaromír Holan	(bronze) European Championships (1966)	
Annerose Baier	East Germany	Eberhard Rüger	(gold) East German Championships (1964–70)	
Walter Bainbridge	United States	Lois Waring	(gold) U.S. Championships (1947–49)	
Jean-Luc Baker	United States	Kaitlin Hawayek	(gold) Four Continents Championships (2018); World Junior Championships (2014)	
Jean-Luc Baker	United States	Kaitlin Hawayek	(silver) Junior Grand Prix Final (2013)	
Csaba Bálint	Hungary	Judit Péterfy	(gold) Hungarian Championships (1982–83)	
Csaba Bálint	Hungary	Judit Péterfy	(silver) World Junior Championships (1980)	
Vitali Baranov	Great Britain	Marika Humphreys	(gold) British Championships (2001–02)	
Daniil Barantsev	Russia	Natalia Romaniuta	(gold) World Junior Championships (2000–01); Junior Grand Prix Final (1999)	
Daniil Barantsev	Russia	Natalia Romaniuta	(bronze) World Junior Championships (1999); Junior Grand Prix Final (1998)	
Karen Barber	Great Britain	Nicky Slater; Kim Spreyer	(gold) British Championships (1985)	
Karen Barber	Great Britain	Nicky Slater; Kim Spreyer	(silver) World Junior Championships (1977)	
Karen Barber	Great Britain	Nicky Slater; Kim Spreyer	(bronze) European Championships (1983)	
Kris Barber	Canada	Kelly Johnson	(silver) World Junior Championships (1978)	
Kris Barber	Canada	Kelly Johnson	(bronze) World Junior Championships (1979)	
Krisztina Barta	Hungary	Ádám Tóth	(gold) Hungarian Championships (2008)	
Nadiia Bashynska	Canada	Peter Beaumont	(gold) Junior Grand Prix Final (2022)	
Nadiia Bashynska	Canada	Peter Beaumont	(bronze) World Junior Championships (2022–23)	
Elena Batanova	Soviet Union	Andrei Antonov; Alexei Soloviev	(gold) World Junior Championships (1980–81); Soviet Championships (1984)	
Elena Batanova	Soviet Union	Andrei Antonov; Alexei Soloviev	(silver) World Junior Championships (1979)	
Evan Bates	United States	Madison Chock; Emily Samuelson	(gold) Winter Olympics (2022); World Championships (2023–24); Four Continents Championships (2019–20, 2023); Grand Prix Final (2023); U.S. Championships (2015, 2020, 2022–24); World Junior Championships (2008)	
Evan Bates	United States	Madison Chock; Emily Samuelson	(silver) World Championships (2015); Four Continents Championships (2015–16); Grand Prix Final (2014–15, 2019, 2022); Junior Grand Prix Final (2006–07)	
Evan Bates	United States	Madison Chock; Emily Samuelson	(bronze) World Championships (2016, 2022); Four Continents Championships (2009, 2013, 2017)	
Egor Bazin	Russia	Elizaveta Khudaiberdieva	(gold) Russian Championships (2023)	
Peter Beaumont	Canada	Nadiia Bashynska	(gold) Junior Grand Prix Final (2022)	
Peter Beaumont	Canada	Nadiia Bashynska	(bronze) World Junior Championships (2022–23)	
Pierre Béchu	France	Nathalie Hervé	(gold) French Championships (1980–84)	
Christina Beier	Germany	William Beier	(gold) German Championships (2005–06, 2008, 2010)	
William Beier	Germany	Christina Beier	(gold) German Championships (2005–06, 2008, 2010)	
Alla Beknazarova	Ukraine	Yuriy Kocherzhenko; Vladimir Zuev	(gold) Ukrainian Championships (2001, 2007–08)	
Tanith Belbin	United States	Benjamin Agosto	(gold) Four Continents Championships (2004–06); U.S. Championships (2004–08); World Junior Championships (2002); Junior Grand Prix Final (2000)	
Tanith Belbin	United States	Benjamin Agosto	(silver) Winter Olympics (2006); World Championships (2005, 2009); Four Continents Championships (2002–03, 2007); Grand Prix Final (2004, 2007); World Junior Championships (2001)	
Tanith Belbin	United States	Benjamin Agosto	(bronze) World Championships (2006–07); Grand Prix Final (2003); World Junior Championships (2000)	
Maciej Bernadowski	Poland	Alexandra Zvorigina	(gold) Polish Championships (2011–13)	
Natalia Bestemianova	Soviet Union	Andrei Bukin	(gold) Winter Olympics (1988); World Championships (1985–88); European Championships (1983, 1985–88); Soviet Championships (1982–83, 1987)	
Natalia Bestemianova	Soviet Union	Andrei Bukin	(silver) Winter Olympics (1984); World Championships (1982–84); European Championships (1982, 1984)	
Natalia Bestemianova	Soviet Union	Andrei Bukin	(bronze) World Championships (1981)	
Peter Betts	United States	Yvonne Littlefield	(gold) U.S. Championships (1962)	
Hynek Bílek	Slovakia	Ivana Dlhopolčeková	(gold) Slovak Championships (2004)	
Agata Błażowska	Poland	Marcin Kozubek	(gold) Polish Championships (1999)	
Agata Błażowska	Poland	Marcin Kozubek	(bronze) World Junior Championships (1997)	
Judy Blumberg	United States	Michael Seibert	(gold) U.S. Championships (1981–85)	
Judy Blumberg	United States	Michael Seibert	(bronze) World Championships (1983–85)	
Ekaterina Bobrova	Russia	Dmitri Soloviev	(gold) Winter Olympics (2014); European Championships (2013); Russian Championships (2011–14, 2016–18); World Junior Championships (2007)	
Ekaterina Bobrova	Russia	Dmitri Soloviev	(silver) Winter Olympics (2018); European Championships (2011–12, 2018)	
Ekaterina Bobrova	Russia	Dmitri Soloviev	(bronze) World Championships (2013); European Championships (2016–17); Junior Grand Prix Final (2006)	
Carmel Bodel	United States	Edward Bodel	(gold) U.S. Championships (1951, 1954–55)	
Carmel Bodel	United States	Edward Bodel	(bronze) World Championships (1954)	
Edward Bodel	United States	Carmel Bodel	(gold) U.S. Championships (1951, 1954–55)	
Edward Bodel	United States	Carmel Bodel	(bronze) World Championships (1954)	
Brent Bommentre	United States	Kimberly Navarro	(bronze) Four Continents Championships (2008)	
Doriane Bontemps	France	Charles Paliard	(bronze) World Junior Championships (1985)	
Petra Born	West Germany	Rainer Schönborn	(gold) German Championships (1983–85)	
Petra Born	West Germany	Rainer Schönborn	(bronze) European Championships (1985)	
Evgeni Borounov	Australia	Maria Borounov	(gold) Australian Championships (2007)	
Maria Borounov	Australia	Evgeni Borounov	(gold) Australian Championships (2007)	
Shae-Lynn Bourne	Canada	Victor Kraatz	(gold) World Championships (2003); Four Continents Championships (1999, 2001, 2003); Grand Prix Final (1996, 2001); Canadian Championships (1993–99, 2001–03)	
Shae-Lynn Bourne	Canada	Victor Kraatz	(silver) World Championships (2002); Grand Prix Final (1997)	
Shae-Lynn Bourne	Canada	Victor Kraatz	(bronze) World Championships (1996–99)	
Fabian Bourzat	France	Nathalie Péchalat	(gold) European Championships (2011–12); French Championships (2009, 2011–14)	
Fabian Bourzat	France	Nathalie Péchalat	(silver) Grand Prix Final (2010)	
Fabian Bourzat	France	Nathalie Péchalat	(bronze) World Championships (2012, 2014); Grand Prix Final (2009, 2011–13)	
Roy Bradshaw	Great Britain	Susan Getty	(gold) British Championships (1970–71, 1973–74)	
Roy Bradshaw	Great Britain	Susan Getty	(bronze) European Championships (1971)	
Geoffrey Brissaud	France	Evgeniia Lopareva	(gold) French Championships (2023–24)	
Gage Brown	United States	Oona Brown	(gold) World Junior Championships (2022)	
Neil Brown	Czech Republic	Lucie Myslivečková	(gold) Czech Championships (2013–14)	
Oona Brown	United States	Gage Brown	(gold) World Junior Championships (2022)	
Corenne Bruhns	Mexico	Ryan Van Natten	(gold) Mexican Championships (2012)	
Michel Brunet	Canada	Chantal Lefebvre	(silver) Four Continents Championships (1999)	
Angelika Buck	West Germany	Erich Buck	(gold) European Championships (1972); German Championships (1968–73)	
Angelika Buck	West Germany	Erich Buck	(silver) World Championships (1971–73); European Championships (1970–71, 1973)	
Angelika Buck	West Germany	Erich Buck	(bronze) World Championships (1970)	
Erich Buck	West Germany	Angelika Buck	(gold) European Championships (1972); German Championships (1968–73)	
Erich Buck	West Germany	Angelika Buck	(silver) World Championships (1971–73); European Championships (1970–71, 1973)	
Erich Buck	West Germany	Angelika Buck	(bronze) World Championships (1970)	
Natalie Buck	Australia	Trent Nelson-Bond	(gold) Australian Championships (2002–06)	
Joseph Buckland	Great Britain	Olivia Smart	(gold) British Championships (2015)	
Nicholas Buckland	Great Britain	Penny Coomes	(gold) British Championships (2012–14, 2016, 2018)	
Nicholas Buckland	Great Britain	Penny Coomes	(bronze) European Championships (2014)	
Joanna Budner	Poland	Jan Mościcki	(gold) Polish Championships (2007–09)	
Andrei Bukin	Soviet Union	Natalia Bestemianova	(gold) Winter Olympics (1988); World Championships (1985–88); European Championships (1983, 1985–88); Soviet Championships (1982–83, 1987)	
Andrei Bukin	Soviet Union	Natalia Bestemianova	(silver) Winter Olympics (1984); World Championships (1982–84); European Championships (1982, 1984)	
Andrei Bukin	Soviet Union	Natalia Bestemianova	(bronze) World Championships (1981)	
Ivan Bukin	Russia	Alexandra Stepanova	(gold) Russian Championships (2021–22, 2024); World Junior Championships (2013); Junior Grand Prix Final (2012)	
Ivan Bukin	Russia	Alexandra Stepanova	(silver) European Championships (2019, 2022); World Junior Championships (2012)	
Ivan Bukin	Russia	Alexandra Stepanova	(bronze) European Championships (2015, 2018, 2020); Junior Grand Prix Final (2010–11)	
Vitali Butikov	Russia	Kristina Gorshkova	(bronze) World Junior Championships (2008); Junior Grand Prix Final (2007)	
Charles Butler	United States	Jessica Joseph	(gold) World Junior Championships (1998)	
Logan Bye	United States	Chloe Lewis	(silver) Winter Youth Olympics (2016)	
Mary Campbell	United States	Johnny Johns	(gold) U.S. Championships (1973)	
Malcolm Cannon	Great Britain	Yvonne Suddick	(silver) World Championships (1968); European Championships (1967–68)	
Malcolm Cannon	Great Britain	Yvonne Suddick	(bronze) World Championships (1967)	
Cao Xianming	China	Zhang Weina	(gold) Chinese Championships (1996–2000, 2002)	
Anna Cappellini	Italy	Luca Lanotte; Matteo Zanni	(gold) World Championships (2014); European Championships (2014); Italian Championships (2012–18)	
Anna Cappellini	Italy	Luca Lanotte; Matteo Zanni	(silver) European Championships (2015–17)	
Anna Cappellini	Italy	Luca Lanotte; Matteo Zanni	(bronze) European Championships (2013); Grand Prix Final (2015); Junior Grand Prix Final (2004–05)	
Quinn Carpenter	United States	Lorraine McNamara	(gold) World Junior Championships (2016); Junior Grand Prix Final (2015)	
Quinn Carpenter	United States	Lorraine McNamara	(silver) World Junior Championships (2015)	
Quinn Carpenter	United States	Lorraine McNamara	(bronze) Junior Grand Prix Final (2013, 2016)	
Christina Carreira	United States	Anthony Ponomarenko	(silver) World Junior Championships (2018); Junior Grand Prix Final (2017)	
Christina Carreira	United States	Anthony Ponomarenko	(bronze) Four Continents Championships (2022); World Junior Championships (2017)	
John Carrell	United States	Lorna Dyer	(gold) U.S. Championships (1967)	
John Carrell	United States	Lorna Dyer	(silver) World Championships (1967)	
John Carrell	United States	Lorna Dyer	(bronze) World Championships (1965–66)	
Pernelle Carron	France	Lloyd Jones	(gold) French Championships (2010)	
Galit Chait	Israel	Sergei Sakhnovski	(gold) Israeli Championships (1996–98, 2000–05)	
Galit Chait	Israel	Sergei Sakhnovski	(bronze) World Championships (2002)	
Jason Chan	Australia	Holly Harris	(gold) Australian Championships (2020)	
Jeffrey Chen	United States	Katarina Wolfkostin	(bronze) Winter Youth Olympics (2020)	
Chen Xizi	China	Xing Jianing	(gold) Chinese Championships (2023–24)	
Yuri Chesnichenko	Soviet Union	Yaroslava Nechaeva	(silver) World Junior Championships (1992)	
Alexandr Chichkov	Soviet Union	Oksana Grishuk	(gold) Soviet Championships (1988); World Junior Championships (1988)	
Alexandr Chichkov	Soviet Union	Oksana Grishuk	(silver) World Junior Championships (1987)	
Madison Chock	United States	Evan Bates; Greg Zuerlein	(gold) Winter Olympics (2022); World Championships (2023–24); Four Continents Championships (2019–20, 2023); Grand Prix Final (2023); U.S. Championships (2015, 2020, 2022–24); World Junior Championships (2009); Junior Grand Prix Final (2008)	
Madison Chock	United States	Evan Bates; Greg Zuerlein	(silver) World Championships (2015); Four Continents Championships (2015–16); Grand Prix Final (2014–15, 2019, 2022)	
Madison Chock	United States	Evan Bates; Greg Zuerlein	(bronze) World Championships (2016, 2022); Four Continents Championships (2013, 2017)	
Guillaume Cizeron	France	Gabriella Papadakis	(gold) Winter Olympics (2022); World Championships (2015–16, 2018–19, 2022); European Championships (2015–19); Grand Prix Final (2017, 2019); French Championships (2015–20, 2022)	
Guillaume Cizeron	France	Gabriella Papadakis	(silver) Winter Olympics (2018); World Championships (2017); European Championships (2020); Grand Prix Final (2016); World Junior Championships (2013); Junior Grand Prix Final (2012)	
Guillaume Cizeron	France	Gabriella Papadakis	(bronze) Grand Prix Final (2014)	
Charlotte Clements	Great Britain	Gary Shortland	(gold) British Championships (1998–99)	
Penny Coomes	Great Britain	Nicholas Buckland	(gold) British Championships (2012–14, 2016, 2018)	
Penny Coomes	Great Britain	Nicholas Buckland	(bronze) European Championships (2014)	
Dean Copely	United States	Charlotte Lichtman	(bronze) World Junior Championships (2011)	
Katherine Copely	Lithuania	Deividas Stagniūnas	(gold) Lithuanian Championships (2007–10)	
Michael Coreno	Canada	Allie Hann-McCurdy	(silver) Four Continents Championships (2010)	
Didier Courtois	France	Corinne Paliard	(gold) French Championships (1988)	
Didier Courtois	France	Corinne Paliard	(bronze) World Junior Championships (1986)	
Vanessa Crone	Canada	Paul Poirier	(gold) Canadian Championships (2011)	
Vanessa Crone	Canada	Paul Poirier	(silver) World Junior Championships (2008)	
Vanessa Crone	Canada	Paul Poirier	(bronze) Four Continents Championships (2011); Grand Prix Final (2010)	
Lukáš Csölley	Slovakia	Lucie Myslivečková; Federica Testa; Nikola Višňová	(gold) Slovak Championships (2009–11, 2012, 2014–15, 2017–18)	
Peter Dalby	Great Britain	Janet Sawbridge	(gold) British Championships (1972)	
Peter Dalby	Great Britain	Janet Sawbridge	(bronze) European Championships (1972)	
Natalie D'Alessandro	Canada	Bruce Waddell	(silver) World Junior Championships (2022)	
Natalie D'Alessandro	Canada	Bruce Waddell	(bronze) Winter Youth Olympics (2020)	
Anne Davies	United States	Carleton Hoffner	(gold) U.S. Championships (1946)	
Nesta Davies	Great Britain	Paul Thomas	(silver) World Championships (1954); European Championships (1954)	
Meryl Davis	United States	Charlie White	(gold) Winter Olympics (2014); World Championships (2011, 2013); Four Continents Championships (2009, 2011, 2013); Grand Prix Final (2009–13); U.S. Championships (2009–14)	
Meryl Davis	United States	Charlie White	(silver) Winter Olympics (2010); World Championships (2010, 2012); Four Continents Championships (2008, 2012); Junior Grand Prix Final (2005)	
Meryl Davis	United States	Charlie White	(bronze) Winter Olympics (2014); Grand Prix Final (2008); World Junior Championships (2006)	
Ekaterina Davydova	United States	Roman Kostomarov	(gold) World Junior Championships (1996)	
Christopher Dean	Great Britain	Jayne Torvill	(gold) Winter Olympics (1984); World Championships (1981–84); European Championships (1981–82, 1984, 1994); British Championships (1979–84, 1994)	
Christopher Dean	Great Britain	Jayne Torvill	(bronze) Winter Olympics (1994)	
David DeFazio	Switzerland	Nora von Bergen	(gold) Swiss Championships (2007)	
Benjamin Delmas	France	Alia Ouabdelsselam	(gold) French Championships (2002)	
Isabelle Delobel	France	Olivier Schoenfelder	(gold) World Championships (2008); European Championships (2007); Grand Prix Final (2008); French Championships (2003–08)	
Isabelle Delobel	France	Olivier Schoenfelder	(silver) European Championships (2008); World Junior Championships (1996)	
Isabelle Delobel	France	Olivier Schoenfelder	(bronze) European Championships (2005); Grand Prix Final (2007)	
Lawrence Demmy	Great Britain	Jean Westwood	(gold) World Championships (1952–55); European Championships (1954–55); British Championships (1953–55)	
Albena Denkova	Bulgaria	Hristo Nikolov; Maxim Staviski	(gold) World Championships (2006–07); Grand Prix Final (2006); Bulgarian Championships (1992–93, 1997–2007)	
Albena Denkova	Bulgaria	Hristo Nikolov; Maxim Staviski	(silver) World Championships (2004); European Championships (2003–04); Grand Prix Final (2003)	
Albena Denkova	Bulgaria	Hristo Nikolov; Maxim Staviski	(bronze) World Championships (2003); European Championships (2007); Grand Prix Final (2002, 2004)	
Doreen Denny	Great Britain	Courtney Jones	(gold) World Championships (1959–60); European Championships (1959–61); British Championships (1959–61)	
Adrián Díaz	Spain	Sara Hurtado; Olivia Smart	(gold) Spanish Championships (2009, 2012–15, 2018, 2020, 2022)	
Tim Dieck	Spain	Olivia Smart	(gold) Spanish Championships (2024)	
Tim Dieck	Germany	Katharina Müller	(gold) German Championships (2020–21)	
Ivana Dlhopolcekova	Slovakia	Hynek Bílek	(gold) Slovak Championships (2004)	
Oksana Domnina	Russia	Maxim Shabalin	(gold) World Championships (2009); European Championships (2008, 2010); Grand Prix Final (2007); Russian Championships (2005, 2007, 2010); World Junior Championships (2003); Junior Grand Prix Final (2002)	
Oksana Domnina	Russia	Maxim Shabalin	(silver) European Championships (2007); Grand Prix Final (2008)	
Oksana Domnina	Russia	Maxim Shabalin	(bronze) Winter Olympics (2010); Grand Prix Final (2006)	
Zachary Donohue	United States	Madison Hubbell	(gold) Winter Olympics (2022); Four Continents Championships (2014); Grand Prix Final (2018); U.S. Championships (2018–19, 2021)	
Zachary Donohue	United States	Madison Hubbell	(silver) World Championships (2018, 2021–22)	
Zachary Donohue	United States	Madison Hubbell	(bronze) Winter Olympics (2022); World Championships (2019); Four Continents Championships (2020); Grand Prix Final (2019)	
Elena Dostatni	Russia	Maxim Shabalin	(gold) Junior Grand Prix Final (2001)	
Elena Dostatni	Russia	Maxim Shabalin	(silver) World Junior Championships (2002); Junior Grand Prix Final (2000)	
Elena Dostatni	Russia	Maxim Shabalin	(bronze) World Junior Championships (2001)	
Margarita Drobiazko	Lithuania	Povilas Vanagas	(gold) Lithuanian Championships (1992–2002, 2005–06)	
Margarita Drobiazko	Lithuania	Povilas Vanagas	(bronze) World Championships (2000); European Championships (2000, 2006); Grand Prix Final (1999–2001)	
Pavel Drozd	Russia	Alla Loboda	(silver) World Junior Championships (2017); Junior Grand Prix Final (2014–16)	
Pavel Drozd	Russia	Alla Loboda	(bronze) World Junior Championships (2016)	
Joseph Druar	United States	Susan Wynne	(gold) U.S. Championships (1989–90)	
Marie-France Dubreuil	Canada	Patrice Lauzon; Bruno Yvars	(gold) Four Continents Championships (2007); Canadian Championships (2000, 2004–07)	
Marie-France Dubreuil	Canada	Patrice Lauzon; Bruno Yvars	(silver) World Championships (2006–07); Four Continents Championships (2000, 2004); Grand Prix Final (2006)	
Marie-France Dubreuil	Canada	Patrice Lauzon; Bruno Yvars	(bronze) Four Continents Championships (2001); Grand Prix Final (2005); World Junior Championships (1990)	
Isabelle Duchesnay	France	Paul Duchesnay	(gold) World Championships (1991); French Championships (1986–87, 1990–91)	
Isabelle Duchesnay	France	Paul Duchesnay	(silver) Winter Olympics (1992); World Championships (1990); European Championships (1991)	
Isabelle Duchesnay	France	Paul Duchesnay	(bronze) World Championships (1989); European Championships (1988, 1990)	
Paul Duchesnay	France	Isabelle Duchesnay	(gold) World Championships (1991); French Championships (1986–87, 1990–91)	
Paul Duchesnay	France	Isabelle Duchesnay	(silver) Winter Olympics (1992); World Championships (1990); European Championships (1991)	
Paul Duchesnay	France	Isabelle Duchesnay	(bronze) World Championships (1989); European Championships (1988, 1990)	
Dmitri Dun	Ukraine	Siobhan Heekin-Canedy	(gold) Ukrainian Championships (2012–14)	
Tatiana Durasova	Soviet Union	Sergei Ponomarenko	(gold) World Junior Championships (1978–79)	
Portia Duval-Rigby	Australia	Francis Rigby	(gold) Australian Championships (2000–01)	
Lorna Dyer	United States	John Carrell	(gold) U.S. Championships (1967)	
Lorna Dyer	United States	John Carrell	(silver) World Championships (1967)	
Lorna Dyer	United States	John Carrell	(bronze) World Championships (1965–66)	
Daniel Eaton	United States	Alexandra Aldridge	(bronze) Four Continents Championships (2014); World Junior Championships (2012–13); Junior Grand Prix Final (2012)	
Daniel Eaton	South Korea	Yura Min	(gold) South Korean Championships (2020)	
Madeline Edwards	Canada	Zhao Kai Pang	(bronze) World Junior Championships (2014)	
Owen Edwards	Great Britain	Louise Walden	(gold) British Championships (2011)	
Tobias Eisenbauer	Austria	Kira Geil	(gold) Austrian Championships (2011, 2013–14)	
Attila Elek	Hungary	Nóra Hoffmann	(gold) Hungarian Championships (2003–07); Junior Grand Prix Final (2003)	
Attila Elek	Hungary	Nóra Hoffmann	(silver) World Junior Championships (2003–04); Junior Grand Prix Final (2002)	
Ramona Elsener	Switzerland	Florian Roost	(gold) Swiss Championships (2010–14)	
Igor Eremenko	Russia	Sofia Shevchenko	(gold) Junior Grand Prix Final (2018)	
Igor Eremenko	Russia	Sofia Shevchenko	(bronze) World Junior Championships (2019)	
Marco Fabbri	Italy	Charlène Guignard	(gold) European Championships (2023–24); Italian Championships (2019–24)	
Marco Fabbri	Italy	Charlène Guignard	(silver) World Championships (2023); Grand Prix Final (2023)	
Marco Fabbri	Italy	Charlène Guignard	(bronze) World Championships (2024); European Championships (2019, 2022); Grand Prix Final (2018, 2022)	
Federica Faiella	Italy	Luciano Milo; Massimo Scali	(gold) Italian Championships (2003–05, 2007–10); Junior Grand Prix Final (1997)	
Federica Faiella	Italy	Luciano Milo; Massimo Scali	(silver) European Championships (2009–10); World Junior Championships (1998–99); Junior Grand Prix Final (1998)	
Federica Faiella	Italy	Luciano Milo; Massimo Scali	(bronze) World Championships (2010)	
Rinat Farkhoutdinov	Japan	Nakako Tsuzuki	(gold) Japan Championships (1999–2001)	
Vladimir Fedorov	Soviet Union	Liudmila Berezova	(silver) World Junior Championships (1989)	
Vladimir Fedorov	Russia	Anjelika Krylova	(gold) Russian Championships (1994)	
Vladimir Fedorov	Russia	Anjelika Krylova	(bronze) World Championships (1993)	
Lilah Fear	Great Britain	Lewis Gibson	(gold) British Championships (2017, 2019–20, 2022–24)	
Lilah Fear	Great Britain	Lewis Gibson	(silver) European Championships (2023–24)	
Máté Fejes	Hungary	Zsuzsanna Nagy	(gold) Hungarian Championships (2012–13)	
Luis Fenero	Spain	Celia Robledo	(gold) Spanish Championships (2016)	
Iwona Filipowicz	Poland	Michał Szumski	(bronze) World Junior Championships (1995)	
Shane Firus	Canada	Carolane Soucisse	(silver) Four Continents Championships (2018)	
Shane Firus	Ireland	Carolane Soucisse	(gold) Irish Championships (2023)	
Bernard Ford	Great Britain	Diane Towler	(gold) World Championships (1966–69); European Championships (1966–69); British Championships (1966–69)	
Brandon Forsyth	United States	Emilie Nussear	(silver) World Junior Championships (2000); Junior Grand Prix Final (1999)	
Kristin Fortune	United States	Dennis Sveum	(gold) U.S. Championships (1965–66)	
Kristin Fortune	United States	Dennis Sveum	(silver) World Championships (1966)	
Laurence Fournier Beaudry	Denmark	Nikolaj Sørensen	(gold) Danish Championships (2014–15, 2018)	
Laurence Fournier Beaudry	Canada	Nikolaj Sørensen	(gold) Canadian Championships (2023)	
Laurence Fournier Beaudry	Canada	Nikolaj Sørensen	(silver) Four Continents Championships (2023–24)	
Kristin Fraser	Azerbaijan	Igor Lukanin	(gold) Azerbaijani Championships (2001–03, 2005)	
Barbara Fusar-Poli	Italy	Maurizio Margaglio	(gold) World Championships (2001); European Championships (2001); Grand Prix Final (2000); Italian Championships (1995–2002, 2006)	
Barbara Fusar-Poli	Italy	Maurizio Margaglio	(silver) World Championships (2000); European Championships (2000, 2002); Grand Prix Final (1999)	
Barbara Fusar-Poli	Italy	Maurizio Margaglio	(bronze) Winter Olympics (2002)	
Marko Jevgeni Gaidajenko	Estonia	Solène Mazingue	(gold) Estonian Championships (2022, 2024)	
Alexander Gamelin	South Korea	Yura Min	(gold) South Korean Championships (2017–18)	
Francis Gamichon	France	Brigitte Martin	(gold) French Championships (1965–67)	
Francis Gamichon	France	Brigitte Martin	(bronze) European Championships (1967)	
Gao Chongbo	China	Yang Fang	(gold) Chinese Championships (2001, 2003–05)	
Karyn Garossino	Canada	Rod Garossino	(gold) Canadian Championships (1989)	
Karyn Garossino	Canada	Rod Garossino	(bronze) World Junior Championships (1981)	
Rod Garossino	Canada	Karyn Garossino	(gold) Canadian Championships (1989)	
Rod Garossino	Canada	Karyn Garossino	(bronze) World Junior Championships (1981)	
Alexander Gazsi	Germany	Nelli Zhiganshina	(gold) German Championships (2007, 2011–15)	
Zita Gebora	Hungary	András Visontai	(gold) Hungarian Championships (2000–02)	
Kira Geil	Austria	Tobias Eisenbauer; Dmitri Matsjuk	(gold) Austrian Championships (2010–11, 2013–14)	
Judi Genovesi	United States	Kent Weigle	(gold) U.S. Championships (1977)	
Diane Gerencser	Switzerland	Bernard Columberg; Alexander Stanislavov	(gold) Swiss Championships (1989–91, 1993–95)	
Susan Getty	Great Britain	Roy Bradshaw	(gold) British Championships (1970–71, 1973–74)	
Susan Getty	Great Britain	Roy Bradshaw	(bronze) European Championships (1971)	
Samvel Gezalian	Belarus	Tatiana Navka	(gold) Belarusian Championships (1994)	
Samvel Gezalian	Germany	Jennifer Goolsbee	(gold) German Championships (1997)	
Lewis Gibson	Great Britain	Lilah Fear	(gold) British Championships (2017, 2019–20, 2022–24)	
Lewis Gibson	Great Britain	Lilah Fear	(silver) European Championships (2023–24)	
Piper Gilles	Canada	Paul Poirier	(gold) Four Continents Championships (2024); Grand Prix Final (2022); Canadian Championships (2020, 2022, 2024)	
Piper Gilles	Canada	Paul Poirier	(silver) World Championships (2024); Four Continents Championships (2014, 2020)	
Piper Gilles	Canada	Paul Poirier	(bronze) World Championships (2021, 2023); Four Continents Championships (2019); Grand Prix Final (2023)	
Tatiana Gladkova	Soviet Union	Igor Shpilband	(gold) World Junior Championships (1983)	
Tatiana Gladkova	Soviet Union	Igor Shpilband	(silver) World Junior Championships (1982)	
Julia Golovina	Ukraine	Oleg Voyko	(gold) Ukrainian Championships (2003)	
Jennifer Goolsbee	Germany	Samvel Gezalian; Hendryk Schamberger	(gold) German Championships (1992–95, 1997)	
Aleksandr Gorshkov	Soviet Union	Lyudmila Pakhomova	(gold) Winter Olympics (1976); World Championships (1970–74, 1976); European Championships (1970–71, 1973–76); Soviet Championships (1969–71, 1973–75)	
Aleksandr Gorshkov	Soviet Union	Lyudmila Pakhomova	(silver) World Championships (1969); European Championships (1972)	
Aleksandr Gorshkov	Soviet Union	Lyudmila Pakhomova	(bronze) European Championships (1969)	
Anastasia Gorshkova	Russia	Ilia Tkachenko	(bronze) World Junior Championships (2005)	
Kristina Gorshkova	Russia	Vitali Butikov	(bronze) World Junior Championships (2008); Junior Grand Prix Final (2007)	
Christa-Elizabeth Goulakos	Greece	Bradley Yaeger	(gold) Greek Championships (2008)	
Alexander Grachev	Russia	Elena Romanovskaya	(gold) World Junior Championships (2004)	
Alexander Grachev	Russia	Elena Romanovskaya	(silver) Junior Grand Prix Final (2001, 2003)	
Alexander Grachev	Russia	Elena Romanovskaya	(bronze) World Junior Championships (2002–03), Junior Grand Prix Final (2002)	
Caroline Green	United States	Michael Parsons	(gold) Four Continents Championships (2022)	
Hilary Green	Great Britain	Glyn Watts	(gold) British Championships (1976)	
Hilary Green	Great Britain	Glyn Watts	(silver) World Championships (1974); European Championships (1974–75)	
Hilary Green	Great Britain	Glyn Watts	(bronze) World Championships (1973, 1975); European Championships (1973)	
Melissa Gregory	United States	Denis Petukhov	(silver) Four Continents Championships (2005)	
Scott Gregory	United States	Suzanne Semanick	(gold) U.S. Championships (1987–88)	
Darya Grimm	Germany	Michail Savitskiy	(bronze) World Junior Championships (2024); Junior Grand Prix Final (2023)	
Oksana Grishuk	Soviet Union	Alexandr Chichkov; Evgeni Platov	(gold) World Junior Championships (1988); Soviet Championships (1988, 1992)	
Oksana Grishuk	Soviet Union	Alexandr Chichkov; Evgeni Platov	(silver) World Junior Championships (1987)	
Oksana Grishuk	CIS	Alexandr Chichkov; Evgeni Platov	(bronze) World Championships (1992); European Championships (1992)	
Oksana Grishuk	Russia	Alexandr Chichkov; Evgeni Platov	(gold) Winter Olympics (1994, 1998); World Championships (1994–97); European Championships (1996–98); Grand Prix Final (1995, 1997); Russian Championships (1993, 1996)	
Oksana Grishuk	Russia	Alexandr Chichkov; Evgeni Platov	(silver) World Championships (1993); European Championships (1993–94)	
Irina Grishkova	Soviet Union	Viktor Ryzhkin	(gold) Soviet Championships (1967–68)	
Grethe Grünberg	Estonia	Kristjan Rand	(gold) Estonian Championships (2005–07)	
Grethe Grünberg	Estonia	Kristjan Rand	(silver) World Junior Championships (2007)	
Elena Grushina	Ukraine	Ruslan Honcharov	(gold) Ukrainian Championships (1999, 2002, 2004–06)	
Elena Grushina	Ukraine	Ruslan Honcharov	(silver) European Championships (2005–06); Grand Prix Final (2005)	
Elena Grushina	Ukraine	Ruslan Honcharov	(bronze) Winter Olympics (2006); World Championships (2005); European Championships (2004)	
Stéphanie Guardia	France	Franck Laporte	(silver) World Junior Championships (1995)	
Natalia Gudina	Ukraine	Vitali Kurkudym	(bronze) World Junior Championships (1996)	
Jonathan Guerreiro	Russia	Ekaterina Pushkash; Ekaterina Riazanova	(silver) World Junior Championships (2011)	
Jonathan Guerreiro	Russia	Ekaterina Pushkash; Ekaterina Riazanova	(bronze) World Junior Championships (2009); Junior Grand Prix Final (2008)	
Christiane Guhel	France	Jean Paul Guhel	(gold) European Championships (1962); French Championships (1958–62)	
Christiane Guhel	France	Jean Paul Guhel	(silver) World Championships (1962); European Championships (1960–61)	
Christiane Guhel	France	Jean Paul Guhel	(bronze) World Championships (1960); European Championships (1959)	
Jean Paul Guhel	France	Fanny Besson; Christiane Guhel	(gold) European Championships (1962); French Championships (1954–62)	
Jean Paul Guhel	France	Fanny Besson; Christiane Guhel	(silver) World Championships (1962); European Championships (1960–61)	
Jean Paul Guhel	France	Fanny Besson; Christiane Guhel	(bronze) World Championships (1960); European Championships (1959)	
Charlène Guignard	Italy	Marco Fabbri	(gold) European Championships (2023–24); Italian Championships (2019–24)	
Charlène Guignard	Italy	Marco Fabbri	(silver) World Championships (2023); Grand Prix Final (2023)	
Charlène Guignard	Italy	Marco Fabbri	(bronze) World Championships (2024); European Championships (2019, 2022); Grand Prix Final (2018, 2022)	
Allie Hann-McCurdy	Canada	Michael Coreno	(silver) Four Continents Championships (2010)	
Holly Harris	Australia	Jason Chan	(gold) Australian Championships (2020)	
Harold Hartshorne	United States	Sandy MacDonald; Nettie Prantell	(gold) U.S. Championships (1937–41)	
Kaitlin Hawayek	United States	Jean-Luc Baker	(gold) Four Continents Championships (2018); World Junior Championships (2014)	
Kaitlin Hawayek	United States	Jean-Luc Baker	(silver) Junior Grand Prix Final (2013)	
Siobhan Heekin-Canedy	Ukraine	Dmitri Dun; Alexander Shakalov	(gold) Ukrainian Championships (2011–14)	
Carolina Hermann	Germany	Daniel Hermann	(gold) German Championships (2009)	
Daniel Hermann	Germany	Carolina Hermann	(gold) German Championships (2009)	
Nathalie Hervé	France	Pierre Béchu; Pierre Husarek	(gold) French Championships (1980–84)	
Nathalie Hervé	France	Pierre Béchu; Pierre Husarek	(bronze) World Junior Championships (1978)	
Barbara Herzog	Austria	Dmytro Matsyuk	(gold) Austrian Championships (2002–04)	
David Hickinbottom	Great Britain	Janet Sawbridge	(gold) British Championships (1964–65)	
David Hickinbottom	Great Britain	Janet Sawbridge	(silver) World Championships (1965); European Championships (1964–65)	
David Hickinbottom	Great Britain	Janet Sawbridge	(bronze) World Championships (1964); European Championships (1963)	
Nóra Hoffmann	Hungary	Attila Elek; Maxim Zavozin	(gold) Hungarian Championships (2003–07, 2009–11); Junior Grand Prix Final (2003)	
Nóra Hoffmann	Hungary	Attila Elek; Maxim Zavozin	(silver) World Junior Championships (2003–04); Junior Grand Prix Final (2002)	
Carleton Hoffner	United States	Anne Davies	(gold) U.S. Championships (1946)	
Carleton Hoffner	United States	Anne Davies	(bronze) World Championships (1949)	
Jaromír Holan	Czechoslovakia	Jitka Babická; Dana Holanová	(gold) Czechoslovak Championships (1966–69)	
Jaromír Holan	Czechoslovakia	Jitka Babická; Dana Holanová	(bronze) European Championships (1966)	
Dana Holanová	Czechoslovakia	Jaromír Holan	(gold) Czechoslovak Championships (1968–69)	
Ruslan Honcharov	Ukraine	Elena Grushina	(gold) Ukrainian Championships (1999, 2002, 2004–06)	
Ruslan Honcharov	Ukraine	Elena Grushina	(silver) European Championships (2005–06); Grand Prix Final (2005)	
Ruslan Honcharov	Ukraine	Elena Grushina	(bronze) Winter Olympics (2006); World Championships (2005); European Championships (2004)	
Gabriela Hrázská	Czech Republic	Jiří Procházka	(gold) Czech Championships (1999)	
Huang Xintong	China	Zheng Xun	(gold) Chinese Championships (2007, 2009, 2011–12, 2014)	
Keiffer Hubbell	United States	Madison Hubbell	(gold) Junior Grand Prix Final (2006)	
Keiffer Hubbell	United States	Madison Hubbell	(gold) Junior Grand Prix Final (2008)	
Keiffer Hubbell	United States	Madison Hubbell	(bronze) Four Continents Championships (2010)	
Madison Hubbell	United States	Zachary Donohue; Keiffer Hubbell	(gold) Winter Olympics (2022); Four Continents Championships (2014); Grand Prix Final (2018); U.S. Championships (2018–19, 2021); Junior Grand Prix Final (2006)	
Madison Hubbell	United States	Zachary Donohue; Keiffer Hubbell	(silver) World Championships (2018, 2021–22); Junior Grand Prix Final (2008)	
Madison Hubbell	United States	Zachary Donohue; Keiffer Hubbell	(bronze) Winter Olympics (2022); World Championships (2019); Four Continents Championships (2010, 2020); Grand Prix Final (2019)	
Daniel Hugentobler	Switzerland	Eliane Hugentobler	(gold) Swiss Championships (1998–2002)	
Eliane Hugentobler	Switzerland	Daniel Hugentobler	(gold) Swiss Championships (1998–2002)	
Marika Humphreys	Great Britain	Philip Askew; Vitaliy Baranov; Justin Lanning	(gold) British Championships (1993, 1996–97, 2001–02)	
Jessica Huot	Finland	Juha Valkama	(gold) Finnish Championships (2002–04)	
Sara Hurtado	Spain	Adrián Díaz; Kirill Khaliavin	(gold) Spanish Championships (2009, 2012–15, 2017, 2019)	
Mariia Ignateva	Hungary	Danijil Szemko	(gold) Hungarian Championships (2022–24)	
Elena Ilinykh	Russia	Nikita Katsalapov; Ruslan Zhiganshin	(gold) Winter Olympics (2014); Russian Championships (2015); World Junior Championships (2010)	
Elena Ilinykh	Russia	Nikita Katsalapov; Ruslan Zhiganshin	(silver) European Championships (2013–14); Junior Grand Prix Final (2009)	
Elena Ilinykh	Russia	Nikita Katsalapov; Ruslan Zhiganshin	(bronze) Winter Olympics (2014); European Championships (2012)	
Mitchell Islam	Canada	Alexandra Paul	(silver) World Junior Championships (2010)	
Donald Jacoby	United States	Andree Anderson	(gold) U.S. Championships (1958–59)	
Donald Jacoby	United States	Andree Anderson	(silver) World Championships (1959)	
Donald Jacoby	United States	Andree Anderson	(bronze) World Championships (1958)	
Olga Jakušina	Latvia	Andrey Nevskiy	(gold) Latvian Championships (2015)	
Diana Janostakova	Czech Republic	Jiří Procházka	(gold) Czech Championships (2005)	
Jennifer Janse van Rensburg	Germany	Benjamin Steffan	(gold) German Championships (2022–24)	
Otar Japaridze	Georgia	Marina Sheltsina	(gold) Georgian Championships (2004)	
Johnny Johns	United States	Mary Campbell	(gold) U.S. Championships (1973)	
Kelly Johnson	Canada	Kris Barber	(silver) World Junior Championships (1978)	
Kelly Johnson	Canada	Kris Barber	(bronze) World Junior Championships (1979)	
Courtney Jones	Great Britain	Doreen Denny; June Markham	(gold) World Championships (1957–60); European Championships (1957–61); British Championships (1957–61)	
Courtney Jones	Great Britain	Doreen Denny; June Markham	(silver) World Championships (1956); European Championships (1956)	
Lloyd Jones	France	Pernelle Carron	(gold) French Championships (2010)	
Jessica Joseph	United States	Charles Butler	(gold) World Junior Championships (1998)	
Vadim Karkachev	Soviet Union	Natalia Annenko	(gold) World Junior Championships (1982)	
Vadim Karkachev	Soviet Union	Natalia Annenko	(silver) World Junior Championships (1981)	
Gennadi Karponosov	Soviet Union	Natalia Linichuk	(gold) Winter Olympics (1980); World Championships (1978–79); European Championships (1979–80); Soviet Championships (1976, 1979, 1981)	
Gennadi Karponosov	Soviet Union	Natalia Linichuk	(silver) World Championships (1980); European Championships (1978)	
Gennadi Karponosov	Soviet Union	Natalia Linichuk	(bronze) World Championships (1974, 1977); European Championships (1974–77, 1981)	
Gennady Kaskov	Soviet Union	Ilona Melnichenko	(gold) World Junior Championships (1987)	
Nikita Katsalapov	Russia	Elena Ilinykh; Victoria Sinitsina	(gold) Winter Olympics (2014); World Championships (2021); European Championships (2020, 2022); Russian Championships (2019–20); World Junior Championships (2010)	
Nikita Katsalapov	Russia	Elena Ilinykh; Victoria Sinitsina	(silver) Winter Olympics (2022); World Championships (2019); European Championships (2013–14); Grand Prix Final (2018); Junior Grand Prix Final (2009)	
Nikita Katsalapov	Russia	Elena Ilinykh; Victoria Sinitsina	(bronze) Winter Olympics (2014, 2022); European Championships (2012)	
Aleksandra Kauc	Poland	Michał Zych	(gold) Polish Championships (2004–06)	
Maria Kazakova	Georgia	Georgy Reviya	(gold) Junior Grand Prix Final (2019)	
Maria Kazakova	Georgia	Georgy Reviya	(silver) World Junior Championships (2020)	
Daniela Keller	Switzerland	Fabian Keller	(gold) Swiss Championships (2005)	
Fabian Keller	Switzerland	Daniela Keller	(gold) Swiss Championships (2005)	
Roger Kennerson	Great Britain	Yvonne Suddick	(silver) European Championships (1966)	
Roger Kennerson	Great Britain	Yvonne Suddick	(bronze) European Championships (1964–65)	
John Kerr	Great Britain	Sinead Kerr	(gold) British Championships (2004–10)	
John Kerr	Great Britain	Sinead Kerr	(bronze) European Championships (2009, 2011)	
Sinead Kerr	Great Britain	John Kerr	(gold) British Championships (2004–10)	
Sinead Kerr	Great Britain	John Kerr	(bronze) European Championships (2009, 2011)	
Kirill Khaliavin	Spain	Sara Hurtado	(gold) Spanish Championships (2017, 2019)	
Kirill Khaliavin	Russia	Ksenia Monko	(gold) World Junior Championships (2011); Junior Grand Prix Final (2009–10)	
Kirill Khaliavin	Russia	Ksenia Monko	(bronze) World Junior Championships (2010)	
Jana Khokhlova	Russia	Sergei Novitski	(gold) European Championships (2009); Russian Championships (2008–09)	
Jana Khokhlova	Russia	Sergei Novitski	(bronze) World Championships (2008); European Championships (2008, 2010)	
Elizaveta Khudaiberdieva	Russia	Egor Bazin; Nikita Nazarov	(gold) Russian Championships (2023)	
Elizaveta Khudaiberdieva	Russia	Egor Bazin; Nikita Nazarov	(silver) World Junior Championships (2019)	
Elizaveta Khudaiberdieva	Russia	Egor Bazin; Nikita Nazarov	(bronze) Junior Grand Prix Final (2018)	
Akiyuki Kido	Japan	Nozomi Watanabe	(gold) Japan Championships (2004–07)	
Alexei Kiliakov	Israel	Elizabeth Tkachenko	(gold) Israeli Championships (2023)	
Alexei Kiliakov	Israel	Elizabeth Tkachenko	(silver) World Junior Championships (2024); Junior Grand Prix Final (2023)	
Kim Hye-min	South Korea	Kim Min-woo	(gold) South Korean Championships (2003–05)	
Kim Min-woo	South Korea	Kim Hye-min	(gold) South Korean Championships (2003–05)	
Angelika Kirchmayr	Soviet Union	Dmitri Lagutin	(gold) World Junior Championships (1989)	
Alexandr Kirsanov	Azerbaijan	Barbara Hanley	(gold) Azerbaijani Championships (2000)	
Marina Klimova	Soviet Union	Sergei Ponomarenko	(gold) World Championships (1989–90); European Championships (1989–91); Soviet Championships (1985–86, 1988–90)	
Marina Klimova	Soviet Union	Sergei Ponomarenko	(silver) Winter Olympics (1988); World Championships (1985–88, 1991); European Championships (1985–87)	
Marina Klimova	Soviet Union	Sergei Ponomarenko	(bronze) Winter Olympics (1984); European Championships (1984)	
Marina Klimova	CIS	Sergei Ponomarenko	(gold) Winter Olympics (1992); World Championships (1992); European Championships (1992)	
Oksana Klimova	Finland	Sasha Palomäki	(gold) Finnish Championships (2009–10)	
Petr Knoth	Czech Republic	Petra Pachlová	(gold) Czech Championships (2004)	
Yuriy Kocherzhenko	Ukraine	Alla Beknazarova	(gold) Ukrainian Championships (2001)	
Petri Kokko	Finland	Virpi Kunnas; Susanna Rahkamo	(gold) European Championships (1995); Finnish Championships (1984–85, 1987–91, 1995)	
Petri Kokko	Finland	Virpi Kunnas; Susanna Rahkamo	(silver) World Championships (1995)	
Petri Kokko	Finland	Virpi Kunnas; Susanna Rahkamo	(bronze) World Championships (1994); European Championships (1993)	
Sebastian Kolasiński	Poland	Sylwia Nowak-Trębacka	(gold) Polish Championships (1994–98, 2000–03); World Junior Championships (1994)	
Sebastian Kolasiński	Poland	Sylwia Nowak-Trębacka	(silver) World Junior Championships (1993)	
Vadym Kolesnik	United States	Avonley Nguyen	(gold) World Junior Championships (2020)	
Vadym Kolesnik	United States	Avonley Nguyen	(silver) Junior Grand Prix Final (2019)	
Tim Koleto	South Korea	Yura Min	(gold) South Korean Championships (2014)	
Tim Koleto	Japan	Misato Komatsubara	(gold) Japan Championships (2019–22, 2024)	
Tim Koleto	Japan	Misato Komatsubara	(silver) Winter Olympics (2022)	
Misato Komatsubara	Japan	Tim Koleto	(gold) Japan Championships (2019–22, 2024)	
Misato Komatsubara	Japan	Tim Koleto	(silver) Winter Olympics (2022)	
Roman Kostomarov	Russia	Ekaterina Davydova; Tatiana Navka	(gold) Winter Olympics (2006); World Championships (2004–05); European Championships (2004–06); Grand Prix Final (2003–05); Russian Championships (2003–04, 2006); World Junior Championships (1996)	
Roman Kostomarov	Russia	Ekaterina Davydova; Tatiana Navka	(silver) Grand Prix Final (2002)	
Roman Kostomarov	Russia	Ekaterina Davydova; Tatiana Navka	(bronze) European Championships (2003)	
Kateřina Kovalová	Czech Republic	David Szurman	(gold) Czech Championships (2000–01)	
Marcin Kozubek	Poland	Agata Błażowska	(gold) Polish Championships (1999)	
Marcin Kozubek	Poland	Agata Błażowska	(bronze) World Junior Championships (1997)	
Victor Kraatz	Canada	Shae-Lynn Bourne	(gold) World Championships (2003); Four Continents Championships (1999, 2001, 2003); Grand Prix Final (1996, 2001); Canadian Championships (1993–99, 2001–03)	
Victor Kraatz	Canada	Shae-Lynn Bourne	(silver) World Championships (2002); Grand Prix Final (1997)	
Victor Kraatz	Canada	Shae-Lynn Bourne	(bronze) World Championships (1996–99)	
Leonie Krail	Switzerland	Oscar Peter	(gold) Swiss Championships (2006, 2008–09)	
Elena Krykanova	Soviet Union	Evgeni Platov	(gold) World Junior Championships (1984–86)	
Anjelika Krylova	Russia	Vladimir Fedorov; Oleg Ovsyannikov	(gold) World Championships (1998–99); European Championships (1999); Grand Prix Final (1998); Russian Championships (1994–95, 1998–99)	
Anjelika Krylova	Russia	Vladimir Fedorov; Oleg Ovsyannikov	(silver) Winter Olympics (1998); World Championships (1996–97); European Championships (1996–98); Grand Prix Final (1995–96)	
Anjelika Krylova	Russia	Vladimir Fedorov; Oleg Ovsyannikov	(bronze) World Championships (1993); European Championships (1995)	
Juri Kurakin	Bulgaria	Ina Demireva	(gold) Bulgarian Championships (2008)	
Juri Kurakin	Austria	Barbora Řezníčková	(gold) Austrian Championships (2012, 2015–16)	
Vitali Kurkudym	Ukraine	Natalia Gudina	(bronze) World Junior Championships (1996)	
Elena Kustarova	Soviet Union	Sergei Romashkin	(silver) World Junior Championships (1990)	
Elena Kustarova	Soviet Union	Sergei Romashkin	(bronze) World Junior Championships (1991)	
Zachary Lagha	Canada	Marjorie Lajoie	(gold) World Junior Championships (2019)	
Zachary Lagha	Canada	Marjorie Lajoie	(bronze) Four Continents Championships (2023); Winter Youth Olympics (2016)	
Marjorie Lajoie	Canada	Zachary Lagha	(gold) World Junior Championships (2019)	
Marjorie Lajoie	Canada	Zachary Lagha	(bronze) Four Continents Championships (2023); Winter Youth Olympics (2016)	
Jon Lane	Great Britain	Janet Sawbridge	(silver) European Championships (1969)	
Jon Lane	Great Britain	Janet Sawbridge	(bronze) World Championships (1968); European Championships (1968)	
Naomi Lang	United States	Peter Tchernyshev	(gold) Four Continents Championships (2000, 2002); U.S. Championships (1999–2003)	
Naomi Lang	United States	Peter Tchernyshev	(silver) Four Continents Championships (2001)	
Naomi Lang	United States	Peter Tchernyshev	(bronze) Four Continents Championships (1999, 2003)	
Justin Lanning	Great Britain	Marika Humphreys	(gold) British Championships (1993)	
Luca Lanotte	Italy	Anna Cappellini	(gold) World Championships (2014); European Championships (2014); Italian Championships (2012–18)	
Luca Lanotte	Italy	Anna Cappellini	(silver) European Championships (2015–17)	
Luca Lanotte	Italy	Anna Cappellini	(bronze) European Championships (2013); Grand Prix Final (2015); Junior Grand Prix Final (2005)	
Franck Laporte	France	Stéphanie Guardia	(silver) World Junior Championships (1995)	
Patrice Lauzon	Canada	Marie-France Dubreuil	(gold) Four Continents Championships (2007); Canadian Championships (2000, 2004–07)	
Patrice Lauzon	Canada	Marie-France Dubreuil	(silver) World Championships (2006–07); Four Continents Championships (2000, 2004); Grand Prix Final (2006)	
Patrice Lauzon	Canada	Marie-France Dubreuil	(bronze) Four Continents Championships (2001); Grand Prix Final (2005)	
Pascal Lavanchy	France	Sophie Moniotte	(gold) French Championships (1993–95)	
Pascal Lavanchy	France	Sophie Moniotte	(silver) World Championships (1994); European Championships (1995)	
Pascal Lavanchy	France	Sophie Moniotte	(bronze) World Championships (1995); European Championships (1997)	
Chuen-Gun Lee	South Korea	Yang Tae-hwa	(gold) South Korean Championships (1999–2002)	
Chantal Lefebvre	Canada	Michel Brunet	(silver) Four Continents Championships (1999)	
Chloe Lewis	United States	Logan Bye	(silver) Winter Youth Olympics (2016)	
Svetlana Liapina	Soviet Union	Gorsha Sur	(silver) World Junior Championships (1985)	
Svetlana Liapina	Soviet Union	Gorsha Sur	(bronze) World Junior Championships (1984)	
Charlotte Lichtman	United States	Dean Copely	(bronze) World Junior Championships (2011)	
Hannah Lim	South Korea	Ye Quan	(gold) South Korean Championships (2024)	
Hannah Lim	South Korea	Ye Quan	(silver) World Junior Championships (2023); Junior Grand Prix Final (2022)	
Natalia Linichuk	Soviet Union	Gennadi Karponosov	(gold) Winter Olympics (1980); World Championships (1978–79); European Championships (1979–80); Soviet Championships (1976, 1979, 1981)	
Natalia Linichuk	Soviet Union	Gennadi Karponosov	(silver) World Championships (1980); European Championships (1978)	
Natalia Linichuk	Soviet Union	Gennadi Karponosov	(bronze) World Championships (1974, 1977); European Championships (1974–77, 1981)	
Yvonne Littlefield	United States	Peter Betts	(gold) U.S. Championships (1962)	
Irina Lobacheva	Russia	Ilia Averbukh	(gold) World Championships (2002); European Championships (2003); Grand Prix Final (2002); Russian Championships (1997, 2000–02)	
Irina Lobacheva	Russia	Ilia Averbukh	(silver) Winter Olympics (2002); World Championships (2003); Grand Prix Final (2000)	
Irina Lobacheva	Russia	Ilia Averbukh	(bronze) World Championships (2001); European Championships (1999, 2001–02); Grand Prix Final (1998)	
Alla Loboda	Russia	Pavel Drozd	(silver) World Junior Championships (2017); Junior Grand Prix Final (2014–16)	
Alla Loboda	Russia	Pavel Drozd	(bronze) World Junior Championships (2016)	
James Lochead	United States	Marcella May	(gold) U.S. Championships (1943–44)	
Raymond Lockwood	Great Britain	Barbara Radford	(bronze) World Championships (1955); European Championships (1954–55)	
René Lohse	East Germany	Kati Winkler	(gold) East German Championships (1990)	
René Lohse	Germany	Kati Winkler	(gold) German Championships (1996, 1998–2000, 2003–04)	
René Lohse	Germany	Kati Winkler	(bronze) World Championships (2004)	
Evgenia Lopareva	France	Geoffrey Brissaud	(gold) French Championships (2023–24)	
Kavita Lorenz	Germany	Joti Polizoakis	(gold) German Championships (2016–18)	
Aaron Lowe	Canada	Megan Wing	(bronze) Four Continents Championships (2002, 2004)	
Ádám Lukács	Hungary	Anna Yanovskaya	(gold) Hungarian Championships (2019–20)	
Igor Lukanin	Azerbaijan	Kristin Fraser	(gold) Azerbaijani Championships (2001–03, 2005)	
Yahor Maistrov	Belarus	Ksenia Shmirina	(gold) Belarusian Championships (2008–09)	
Balázs Major	Hungary	Dóra Turóczi	(gold) Hungarian Championships (2014)	
Nikolaj Majorov	Sweden	Milla Ruud Reitan	(gold) Swedish Championships (2024)	
Victoria Manni	Switzerland	Carlo Röthlisberger	(gold) Swiss Championships (2017–20)	
Lydia Manon	United States	Ryan O'Meara	(bronze) Four Continents Championships (2005)	
Maurizio Margaglio	Italy	Barbara Fusar-Poli	(gold) World Championships (2001); European Championships (2001); Grand Prix Final (2000); Italian Championships (1995–2002, 2006)	
Maurizio Margaglio	Italy	Barbara Fusar-Poli	(silver) World Championships (2000); European Championships (2000, 2002); Grand Prix Final (1999)	
Maurizio Margaglio	Italy	Barbara Fusar-Poli	(bronze) Winter Olympics (2002)	
Artem Markelov	United States	Leah Neset	(gold) World Junior Championships (2024); Junior Grand Prix Final (2023)	
June Markham	Great Britain	Courtney Jones	(gold) World Championships (1957–58); European Championships (1957–58); British Championships (1957–58)	
June Markham	Great Britain	Courtney Jones	(silver) World Championships (1956); European Championships (1956)	
Brigitte Martin	France	Francis Gamichon	(gold) French Championships (1965–67)	
Brigitte Martin	France	Francis Gamichon	(bronze) European Championships (1967)	
Roy Mason	Great Britain	Mary Parry	(bronze) European Championships (1960)	
Dmytro Matsyuk	Austria	Kira Geil; Barbara Herzog; Barbora Řezníčková; Regina Yankovska	(gold) Austrian Championships (2002–04, 2006–10, 2017)	
Morgan Matthews	United States	Maxim Zavozin	(gold) World Junior Championships (2005); Junior Grand Prix Final (2004)	
Morgan Matthews	United States	Maxim Zavozin	(silver) Four Continents Championships (2006)	
Morgan Matthews	United States	Maxim Zavozin	(bronze) World Junior Championships (2004); Junior Grand Prix Final (2003)	
Marcella May	United States	James Lochead	(gold) U.S. Championships (1943–44)	
Solène Mazingue	Estonia	Marko Jevgeni Gaidajenko	(gold) Estonian Championships (2022, 2024)	
Robert McCall	Canada	Marie McNeil; Tracy Wilson	(gold) Canadian Championships (1981–88)	
Robert McCall	Canada	Marie McNeil; Tracy Wilson	(bronze) Winter Olympics (1988); World Championships (1986–88); World Junior Championships (1977)	
Michael McGean	United States	Lois Waring	(gold) U.S. Championships (1950, 1952)	
Sharon McKenzie	United States	Bert Wright	(gold) U.S. Championships (1957)	
Sharon McKenzie	United States	Bert Wright	(bronze) World Championships (1957)	
Lorraine McNamara	United States	Quinn Carpenter	(gold) World Junior Championships (2016); Junior Grand Prix Final (2015)	
Lorraine McNamara	United States	Quinn Carpenter	(silver) World Junior Championships (2015)	
Lorraine McNamara	United States	Quinn Carpenter	(bronze) Junior Grand Prix Final (2013, 2016)	
Ilona Melnichenko	Soviet Union	Gennady Kaskov	(gold) World Junior Championships (1987)	
Evgenia Melnik	Belarus	Oleg Krupen	(gold) Belarusian Championships (2007)	
Gregory Merriman	Australia	Danielle O'Brien	(gold) Australian Championships (2008–14)	
Natalia Mikhailova	Russia	Arkadi Sergeev	(silver) World Junior Championships (2006)	
James Millns	United States	Colleen O'Connor	(gold) U.S. Championships (1974–76)	
James Millns	United States	Colleen O'Connor	(silver) World Championships (1975)	
James Millns	United States	Colleen O'Connor	(bronze) Winter Olympics (1976); World Championships (1976)	
Luciano Milo	Italy	Federica Faiella	(gold) Junior Grand Prix Final (1997)	
Luciano Milo	Italy	Federica Faiella	(silver) World Junior Championships (1998–99); Junior Grand Prix Final (1998)	
Yura Min	South Korea	Daniel Eaton; Alexander Gamelin; Tim Koleto	(gold) South Korean Championships (2014, 2017–18, 2020)	
Andrei Minenkov	Soviet Union	Irina Moiseyeva	(gold) World Championships (1975, 1977); European Championships (1977–78); Soviet Championships (1977)	
Andrei Minenkov	Soviet Union	Irina Moiseyeva	(silver) Winter Olympics (1976); World Championships (1976, 1978, 1981); European Championships (1976, 1979, 1981)	
Andrei Minenkov	Soviet Union	Irina Moiseyeva	(bronze) Winter Olympics (1980); World Championships (1979–80, 1982); European Championships (1980, 1982)	
Christopher Mior	Italy	Federica Testa	(gold) Italian Championships (2011)	
Kenji Miyamoto	Japan	Rie Arikawa	(gold) Japan Championships (2002–03)	
Scott Moir	Canada	Tessa Virtue	(gold) Winter Olympics (2010, 2018); World Championships (2010, 2012, 2017); Four Continents Championships (2008, 2012, 2017); Grand Prix Final (2016); Canadian Championships (2008–10, 2012–14, 2017–18); World Junior Championships (2006); Junior Grand Prix Final (2005)	
Scott Moir	Canada	Tessa Virtue	(silver) Winter Olympics (2014); World Championships (2008, 2011, 2013); Four Continents Championships (2009, 2013); Grand Prix Final (2009, 2011–13, 2017); World Junior Championships (2005); Junior Grand Prix Final (2004)	
Scott Moir	Canada	Tessa Virtue	(bronze) World Championships (2009); Four Continents Championships (2006–07)	
Irina Moiseyeva	Soviet Union	Andrei Minenkov	(gold) World Championships (1975, 1977); European Championships (1977–78); Soviet Championships (1977)	
Irina Moiseyeva	Soviet Union	Andrei Minenkov	(silver) Winter Olympics (1976); World Championships (1976, 1978, 1981); European Championships (1976, 1979, 1981)	
Irina Moiseyeva	Soviet Union	Andrei Minenkov	(bronze) Winter Olympics (1980); World Championships (1979–80, 1982); European Championships (1980, 1982)	
Luc Monéger	France	Bérangère Nau	(bronze) World Junior Championships (1993)	
Sophie Moniotte	France	Pascal Lavanchy	(gold) French Championships (1993–95)	
Sophie Moniotte	France	Pascal Lavanchy	(silver) World Championships (1994); European Championships (1995)	
Sophie Moniotte	France	Pascal Lavanchy	(bronze) World Championships (1995); European Championships (1997)	
Ksenia Monko	Russia	Kirill Khaliavin	(gold) World Junior Championships (2011); Junior Grand Prix Final (2010–11)	
Ksenia Monko	Russia	Kirill Khaliavin	(bronze) World Junior Championships (2010)	
Maria Monko	Russia	Ilia Tkachenko	(gold) Junior Grand Prix Final (2007)	
Veronika Moravkova	Czech Republic	Jiří Procházka	(gold) Czech Championships (2002–03)	
Nikolai Morozov	Azerbaijan	Olga Pershankova	(gold) Azerbaijani Championships (1994)	
Nikolai Morozov	Belarus	Tatiana Navka	(gold) Belarusian Championships (1997–98)	
Catherine Morris	Great Britain	Michael Robinson	(silver) European Championships (1958–59)	
Catherine Morris	Great Britain	Michael Robinson	(bronze) European Championships (1957)	
Jan Mościcki	Poland	Joanna Budner; Anastasia Vykhodtseva	(gold) Polish Championships (2007–10)	
Anna Mosenkova	Estonia	Sergei Sychyov	(gold) Estonian Championships (2000–02)	
Sergey Mozgov	Russia	Anna Yanovskaya	(gold) Winter Youth Olympics (2012); World Junior Championships (2015); Junior Grand Prix Final (2013–14)	
Sergey Mozgov	Russia	Anna Yanovskaya	(silver) World Junior Championships (2014); Junior Grand Prix Final (2011)	
Daniel Mrázek	Czech Republic	Kateřina Mrázková	(gold) World Junior Championships (2023); Czech Championships (2024)	
Daniel Mrázek	Czech Republic	Kateřina Mrázková	(bronze) Junior Grand Prix Final (2022)	
Kateřina Mrázková	Czech Republic	Daniel Mrázek	(gold) World Junior Championships (2023); Czech Championships (2024)	
Kateřina Mrázková	Czech Republic	Daniel Mrázek	(bronze) Junior Grand Prix Final (2022)	
Kateřina Mrázová	Czech Republic	Martin Šimeček	(gold) Czech Championships (1994–96, 1998)	
Katharina Müller	Germany	Tim Dieck	(gold) German Championships (2020–21)	
Laura Munana	Mexico	Luke Munana	(gold) Mexican Championships (2005)	
Luke Munana	Mexico	Laura Munana	(gold) Mexican Championships (2005)	
Kana Muramoto	Japan	Chris Reed; Daisuke Takahashi	(gold) Japan Championships (2016–18, 2023)	
Kana Muramoto	Japan	Chris Reed; Daisuke Takahashi	(silver) Four Continents Championships (2022)	
Kana Muramoto	Japan	Chris Reed; Daisuke Takahashi	(bronze) Four Continents Championships (2018)	
Lucie Myslivečková	Slovakia	Lukáš Csölley	(gold) Slovak Championships (2017–18)	
Lucie Myslivečková	Czech Republic	Neil Brown; Matěj Novák	(gold) Czech Championships (2011, 2013–14)	
Zsuzsanna Nagy	Hungary	Máté Fejes	(gold) Hungarian Championships (2012–13)	
Devid Naryzhnyy	Russia	Elizaveta Shanaeva	(bronze) World Junior Championships (2020); Junior Grand Prix Final (2019)	
Bérangère Nau	France	Luc Monéger	(bronze) World Junior Championships (1993)	
Dmitri Naumkin	Russia	Olga Sharutenko	(gold) World Junior Championships (1995)	
Kimberly Navarro	United States	Brent Bommentre	(bronze) Four Continents Championships (2008)	
Tatiana Navka	Belarus	Samvel Gezalian; Nikolai Morozov	(gold) Belarusian Championships (1994, 1997–98)	
Tatiana Navka	Russia	Roman Kostomarov	(gold) Winter Olympics (2006); World Championships (2004–05); European Championships (2004–06); Grand Prix Final (2003–05); Russian Championships (2003–04, 2006)	
Tatiana Navka	Russia	Roman Kostomarov	(silver) Grand Prix Final (2002)	
Tatiana Navka	Russia	Roman Kostomarov	(bronze) European Championships (2003)	
Nikita Nazarov	Russia	Elizaveta Khudaiberdieva	(silver) World Junior Championships (2019)	
Nikita Nazarov	Russia	Elizaveta Khudaiberdieva	(bronze) Junior Grand Prix Final (2018)	
Oleksandra Nazarova	Ukraine	Maksym Nikitin	(gold) Ukrainian Championships (2015, 2017–18, 2020–22)	
Oleksandra Nazarova	Ukraine	Maksym Nikitin	(silver) Winter Youth Olympics (2012)	
Oleksandra Nazarova	Ukraine	Maksym Nikitin	(bronze) World Junior Championships (2015)	
Yaroslava Nechaeva	Soviet Union	Yuri Chesnichenko	(silver) World Junior Championships (1992)	
Maxim Nekrasov	Russia	Arina Ushakova	(silver) Junior Grand Prix Final (2018)	
Maxim Nekrasov	Russia	Arina Ushakova	(bronze) World Junior Championships (2018)	
Trent Nelson-Bond	Australia	Natalie Buck; Danielle Rigg-Smith	(gold) Australian Championships (1999, 2002–06)	
Leah Neset	United States	Artem Markelov	(gold) World Junior Championships (2024); Junior Grand Prix Final (2023)	
Andrey Nevskiy	Latvia	Olga Jakušina	(gold) Latvian Championships (2015)	
Maksym Nikitin	Ukraine	Oleksandra Nazarova	(gold) Ukrainian Championships (2015, 2017–18, 2020–22)	
Maksym Nikitin	Ukraine	Oleksandra Nazarova	(silver) Winter Youth Olympics (2012)	
Maksym Nikitin	Ukraine	Oleksandra Nazarova	(bronze) World Junior Championships (2015)	
Avonley Nguyen	United States	Vadym Kolesnik	(gold) World Junior Championships (2020)	
Avonley Nguyen	United States	Vadym Kolesnik	(silver) Junior Grand Prix Final (2019)	
Matěj Novák	Czech Republic	Lucie Myslivečková	(gold) Czech Championships (2011)	
Sergei Novitski	Russia	Jana Khokhlova	(gold) European Championships (2009); Russian Championships (2008–09)	
Sergei Novitski	Russia	Jana Khokhlova	(bronze) World Championships (2008); European Championships (2008, 2010)	
Sylwia Nowak-Trębacka	Poland	Sebastian Kolasiński	(gold) Polish Championships (1994–98, 2000–03); World Junior Championships (1994)	
Sylwia Nowak-Trębacka	Poland	Sebastian Kolasiński	(silver) World Junior Championships (1993)	
Emilie Nussear	United States	Brandon Forsyth	(silver) World Junior Championships (2000); Junior Grand Prix Final (1999)	
Danielle O'Brien	Australia	Gregory Merriman	(gold) Australian Championships (2008–14)	
Colleen O'Connor	United States	James Millns	(gold) U.S. Championships (1974–76)	
Colleen O'Connor	United States	James Millns	(silver) World Championships (1975)	
Colleen O'Connor	United States	James Millns	(bronze) Winter Olympics (1976); World Championships (1976)	
Pamela O'Connor	Great Britain	Jonathon O'Dougherty	(gold) British Championships (2003)	
Jonathon O'Dougherty	Great Britain	Pamela O'Connor	(gold) British Championships (2003)	
Martine Olivier	France	Yves Tarayre	(gold) French Championships (1979)	
Martine Olivier	France	Yves Tarayre	(bronze) World Junior Championships (1976)	
Ryan O'Meara	United States	Lydia Manon	(bronze) Four Continents Championships (2005)	
Yuka Orihara	Finland	Juho Pirinen	(gold) Finnish Championships (2020)	
Flavia Ottaviani	Italy	Massimo Scali	(bronze) Junior Grand Prix Final (1997)	
Alia Ouabdelsselam	France	Benjamin Delmas	(gold) French Championships (2002)	
Oleg Ovsyannikov	Soviet Union	Maria Orlova	(bronze) World Junior Championships (1988)	
Oleg Ovsyannikov	Russia	Anjelika Krylova	(gold) World Championships (1998–99); European Championships (1999); Grand Prix Final (1998); Russian Championships (1995, 1998–99)	
Oleg Ovsyannikov	Russia	Anjelika Krylova	(silver) Winter Olympics (1998); World Championships (1996–97); European Championships (1996–98); Grand Prix Final (1995–96)	
Oleg Ovsyannikov	Russia	Anjelika Krylova	(bronze) European Championships (1995)	
Petra Pachlová	Czech Republic	Petr Knoth	(gold) Czech Championships (2004)	
Lyudmila Pakhomova	Soviet Union	Aleksandr Gorshkov; Viktor Ryzhkin	(gold) Winter Olympics (1976); World Championships (1970–74, 1976); European Championships (1970–71, 1973–76); Soviet Championships (1964–66, 1969–71, 1973–75)	
Lyudmila Pakhomova	Soviet Union	Aleksandr Gorshkov; Viktor Ryzhkin	(silver) World Championships (1969); European Championships (1972)	
Lyudmila Pakhomova	Soviet Union	Aleksandr Gorshkov; Viktor Ryzhkin	(bronze) European Championships (1969)	
Charles Paliard	France	Doriane Bontemps	(bronze) World Junior Championships (1985)	
Corinne Paliard	France	Didier Courtois	(gold) French Championships (1988)	
Corinne Paliard	France	Didier Courtois	(bronze) World Junior Championships (1986)	
Sasha Palomäki	Finland	Oksana Klimova	(gold) Finnish Championships (2009–10)	
Zhao Kai Pang	Canada	Madeline Edwards	(bronze) World Junior Championships (2014)	
Gabriella Papadakis	France	Guillaume Cizeron	(gold) Winter Olympics (2022); World Championships (2015–16, 2018–19, 2022); European Championships (2015–19); Grand Prix Final (2017, 2019); French Championships (2015–20, 2022)	
Gabriella Papadakis	France	Guillaume Cizeron	(silver) Winter Olympics (2018); World Championships (2017); European Championships (2020); Grand Prix Final (2016); World Junior Championships (2013); Junior Grand Prix Final (2012)	
Gabriella Papadakis	France	Guillaume Cizeron	(bronze) Grand Prix Final (2014)	
Marjorie Parker Smith	United States	Joseph Savage	(gold) U.S. Championships (1936)	
Mary Parry	Great Britain	Roy Mason	(bronze) European Championships (1960)	
Michael Parsons	United States	Caroline Green; Rachel Parsons	(gold) Four Continents Championships (2022); World Junior Championships (2017); Junior Grand Prix Final (2016)	
Michael Parsons	United States	Caroline Green; Rachel Parsons	(silver) World Junior Championships (2016)	
Michael Parsons	United States	Caroline Green; Rachel Parsons	(bronze) Junior Grand Prix Final (2015)	
Rachel Parsons	United States	Michael Parsons	(gold) World Junior Championships (2017); Junior Grand Prix Final (2016)	
Rachel Parsons	United States	Michael Parsons	(silver) World Junior Championships (2016)	
Rachel Parsons	United States	Michael Parsons	(bronze) Junior Grand Prix Final (2015)	
Jussiville Partanen	Finland	Cecilia Törn	(gold) Finnish Championships (2016–18)	
Alexandra Paul	Canada	Mitchell Islam	(silver) World Junior Championships (2010)	
Nathalie Péchalat	France	Fabian Bourzat	(gold) European Championships (2011–12); French Championships (2009, 2011–14)	
Nathalie Péchalat	France	Fabian Bourzat	(silver) Grand Prix Final (2010)	
Nathalie Péchalat	France	Fabian Bourzat	(bronze) World Championships (2012, 2014); Grand Prix Final (2009, 2011–13)	
Gwendal Peizerat	France	Marina Anissina; Marina Morel	(gold) Winter Olympics (2002); World Championships (2000); European Championships (2000, 2002); Grand Prix Final (1999); French Championships (1996–2001)	
Gwendal Peizerat	France	Marina Anissina; Marina Morel	(silver) World Championships (1998–99, 2001); European Championships (1999, 2001); Grand Prix Final (1998, 2001); World Junior Championships (1991)	
Gwendal Peizerat	France	Marina Anissina; Marina Morel	(bronze) Winter Olympics (1998); European Championships (1998); Grand Prix Final (1995–97); World Junior Championships (1989)	
Justin Pekarek	United States	Jamie Silverstein	(gold) World Junior Championships (1999); Junior Grand Prix Final (1998)	
Justin Pekarek	United States	Jamie Silverstein	(bronze) Four Continents Championships (2000)	
Olga Pershankova	Azerbaijan	Nikolai Morozov	(gold) Azerbaijani Championships (1994)	
Oscar Peter	Switzerland	Leonie Krail	(gold) Swiss Championships (2006, 2008–09)	
Judit Péterfy	Hungary	Csaba Bálint	(gold) Hungarian Championships (1982–83)	
Judit Péterfy	Hungary	Csaba Bálint	(silver) World Junior Championships (1980)	
Carol Ann Peters	United States	Daniel Ryan	(gold) U.S. Championships (1953)	
Carol Ann Peters	United States	Daniel Ryan	(bronze) World Championships (1952–53)	
Denis Petukhov	Russia	Oksana Potdykova	(silver) World Junior Championships (1997); Junior Grand Prix Final (1997)	
Denis Petukhov	Russia	Oksana Potdykova	(bronze) World Junior Championships (1998)	
Denis Petukhov	United States	Melissa Gregory	(silver) Four Continents Championships (2005)	
Charles Phillips	United States	Margie Ackles	(gold) U.S. Championships (1960)	
Michael Phillips	Great Britain	Linda Shearman	(gold) European Championships (1963); British Championships (1962–63)	
Michael Phillips	Great Britain	Linda Shearman	(silver) World Championships (1963); European Championships (1962)	
Michael Phillips	Great Britain	Linda Shearman	(bronze) European Championships (1961)	
Phyo Yong-myong	North Korea	Choe Min	(gold) North Korean Championships (2017–20)	
Larry Pierce	United States	Diane Sherbloom	(gold) U.S. Championships (1961)	
Juho Pirinen	Finland	Yuka Orihara	(gold) Finnish Championships (2020)	
Evgeni Platov	Soviet Union	Oksana Grishuk; Elena Krykanova	(gold) World Junior Championships (1984–86); Soviet Championships (1992)	
Evgeni Platov	CIS	Oksana Grishuk; Elena Krykanova	(bronze) World Championships (1992); European Championships (1992)	
Evgeni Platov	Russia	Oksana Grishuk; Elena Krykanova	(gold) Winter Olympics (1994, 1998); World Championships (1994–97); European Championships (1996–98); Grand Prix Final (1995, 1997); Russian Championships (1993, 1996)	
Evgeni Platov	Russia	Oksana Grishuk; Elena Krykanova	(silver) World Championships (1993); European Championships (1993–94)	
Paul Poirier	Canada	Vanessa Crone; Piper Gilles	(gold) Four Continents Championships (2024); Grand Prix Final (2022); Canadian Championships (2011, 2020, 2022, 2024)	
Paul Poirier	Canada	Vanessa Crone; Piper Gilles	(silver) World Championships (2024); Four Continents Championships (2014, 2020); World Junior Championships (2008)	
Paul Poirier	Canada	Vanessa Crone; Piper Gilles	(bronze) World Championships (2021, 2023); Four Continents Championships (2011, 2019); Grand Prix Final (2010, 2023)	
Andrew Poje	Canada	Kaitlyn Weaver	(gold) Four Continents Championships (2010, 2015); Grand Prix Final (2014–15); Canadian Championships (2015–16, 2019)	
Andrew Poje	Canada	Kaitlyn Weaver	(silver) World Championships (2014); Four Continents Championships (2019)	
Andrew Poje	Canada	Kaitlyn Weaver	(bronze) World Championships (2015, 2018); Four Continents Championships (2012, 2016); World Junior Championships (2007)	
Sofia Polishchuk	Russia	Alexander Vakhnov	(bronze) Junior Grand Prix Final (2017)	
Joti Polizoakis	Germany	Kavita Lorenz	(gold) German Championships (2016–18)	
Anthony Ponomarenko	United States	Christina Carreira	(silver) World Junior Championships (2018); Junior Grand Prix Final (2017)	
Anthony Ponomarenko	United States	Christina Carreira	(bronze) Four Continents Championships (2022); World Junior Championships (2017)	
Sergei Ponomarenko	Soviet Union	Tatiana Durasova; Marina Klimova	(gold) World Championships (1989–90); European Championships (1989–91); Soviet Championships (1985–86, 1988–90); World Junior Championships (1978–79)	
Sergei Ponomarenko	Soviet Union	Tatiana Durasova; Marina Klimova	(silver) Winter Olympics (1988); World Championships (1985–88, 1991); European Championships (1985–87)	
Sergei Ponomarenko	Soviet Union	Tatiana Durasova; Marina Klimova	(bronze) Winter Olympics (1984); European Championships (1984)	
Sergei Ponomarenko	CIS	Tatiana Durasova; Marina Klimova	(gold) Winter Olympics (1992); World Championships (1992); European Championships (1992)	
Betina Popova	Russia	Yuri Vlasenko	(bronze) Junior Grand Prix Final (2014)	
Oksana Potdykova	Russia	Denis Petukhov	(silver) World Junior Championships (1997); Junior Grand Prix Final (1997)	
Oksana Potdykova	Russia	Denis Petukhov	(bronze) World Junior Championships (1998)	
Jiří Procházka	Czech Republic	Gabriela Hrázská; Diana Janošťáková; Veronika Morávková	(gold) Czech Championships (1999, 2002–03, 2005)	
Elizabeth Punsalan	United States	Jerod Swallow	(gold) U.S. Championships (1991, 1994, 1996–98)	
Ekaterina Pushkash	Russia	Jonathan Guerreiro	(silver) World Junior Championships (2011)	
Barbara Radford	Great Britain	Raymond Lockwood	(bronze) World Championships (1955); European Championships (1954–55)	
Susanna Rahkamo	Finland	Petri Kokko	(gold) European Championships (1995); Finnish Championships (1987–91, 1995)	
Susanna Rahkamo	Finland	Petri Kokko	(silver) World Championships (1995)	
Susanna Rahkamo	Finland	Petri Kokko	(bronze) World Championships (1994); European Championships (1993)	
Kristjan Rand	Estonia	Grethe Grünberg	(gold) Estonian Championships (2005–07)	
Kristjan Rand	Estonia	Grethe Grünberg	(silver) World Junior Championships (2007)	
Taavi Rand	Estonia	Irina Shtork	(gold) Estonian Championships (2010–13, 2015)	
Stephanie Rauer	Germany	Thomas Rauer	(gold) German Championships (2001–02)	
Thomas Rauer	Germany	Stephanie Rauer	(gold) German Championships (2001–02)	
Juris Razgulajevs	Soviet Union	Aliki Stergiadu	(gold) World Junior Championships (1991)	
Allison Reed	Lithuania	Saulius Ambrulevičius	(gold) Lithuanian Championships (2018–22)	
Allison Reed	Lithuania	Saulius Ambrulevičius	(bronze) European Championships (2024)	
Cathy Reed	Japan	Chris Reed	(gold) Japan Championships (2008–11, 2013–15)	
Chris Reed	Japan	Kana Muramoto; Cathy Reed	(gold) Japan Championships (2008–11, 2013–18)	
Chris Reed	Japan	Kana Muramoto; Cathy Reed	(bronze) Four Continents Championships (2018)	
Mark Reed	Great Britain	Wendy Sessions	(gold) World Junior Championships (1977)	
Krisztina Regőczy	Hungary	András Sallay	(gold) World Championships (1980); Hungarian Championships (1972–80)	
Krisztina Regőczy	Hungary	András Sallay	(silver) Winter Olympics (1980); World Championships (1979); European Championships (1977, 1980)	
Krisztina Regőczy	Hungary	András Sallay	(bronze) World Championships (1978); European Championships (1978–79)	
Georgy Reviya	Georgia	Maria Kazakova	(gold) Junior Grand Prix Final (2019)	
Georgy Reviya	Georgia	Maria Kazakova	(silver) World Junior Championships (2020)	
Barbora Řezníčková	Austria	Juri Kurakin; Dmitri Matsjuk	(gold) Austrian Championships (2006–09, 2012, 2015–16)	
Ekaterina Riazanova	Russia	Jonathan Guerreiro	(bronze) World Junior Championships (2009); Junior Grand Prix Final (2008)	
Francis Rigby	Australia	Portia Duval-Rigby	(gold) Australian Championships (2000–01)	
Gerard Rigby	Great Britain	Barbara Thompson	(silver) European Championships (1957)	
Gerard Rigby	Great Britain	Barbara Thompson	(bronze) World Championships (1956); European Championships (1956, 1958)	
Michael Robinson	Great Britain	Catherine Morris	(silver) European Championships (1958–59)	
Michael Robinson	Great Britain	Catherine Morris	(bronze) European Championships (1957)	
Celia Robledo	Spain	Luis Fenero	(gold) Spanish Championships (2016)	
Renée Roca	United States	Donald Adair; Andrew Ouellette; Gorsha Sur	(gold) U.S. Championships (1986, 1993, 1995)	
Renée Roca	United States	Donald Adair; Andrew Ouellette; Gorsha Sur	(bronze) World Junior Championships (1980)	
Pavel Roman	Czechoslovakia	Eva Romanová	(gold) World Championships (1962–65); European Championships (1964–65); Czechoslovak Championships (1959)	
Pavel Roman	Czechoslovakia	Eva Romanová	(silver) European Championships (1963)	
Pavel Roman	Czechoslovakia	Eva Romanová	(bronze) European Championships (1962)	
Natalia Romaniuta	Russia	Daniil Barantsev	(gold) World Junior Championships (2000–01); Junior Grand Prix Final (1999)	
Natalia Romaniuta	Russia	Daniil Barantsev	(bronze) World Junior Championships (1999); Junior Grand Prix Final (1998)	
Eva Romanová	Czechoslovakia	Pavel Roman	(gold) World Championships (1962–65); European Championships (1964–65); Czechoslovak Championships (1959)	
Eva Romanová	Czechoslovakia	Pavel Roman	(silver) European Championships (1963)	
Eva Romanová	Czechoslovakia	Pavel Roman	(bronze) European Championships (1962)	
Irina Romanova	Ukraine	Igor Yaroshenko	(gold) Ukrainian Championships (1993–98)	
Irina Romanova	Ukraine	Igor Yaroshenko	(bronze) European Championships (1996)	
Elena Romanovskaya	Russia	Alexander Grachev	(gold) World Junior Championships (2004)	
Elena Romanovskaya	Russia	Alexander Grachev	(silver) Junior Grand Prix Final (2001, 2003)	
Elena Romanovskaya	Russia	Alexander Grachev	(bronze) World Junior Championships (2002–03), Junior Grand Prix Final (2002)	
Florian Roost	Switzerland	Ramona Elsener	(gold) Swiss Championships (2010–14)	
Carlo Röthlisberger	Switzerland	Victoria Manni	(gold) Swiss Championships (2017–20)	
Eberhard Rüger	East Germany	Annerose Baier	(gold) East German Championships (1964–70)	
Daniel Ryan	United States	Carol Ann Peters	(gold) U.S. Championships (1953)	
Daniel Ryan	United States	Carol Ann Peters	(bronze) World Championships (1952–53)	
Viktor Ryzhkin	Soviet Union	Irina Grishkova; Lyudmila Pakhomova	(gold) Soviet Championships (1964–68)	
Sergei Sakhnovski	Russia	Ekaterina Svirina	(gold) World Junior Championships (1993)	
Sergei Sakhnovski	Russia	Ekaterina Svirina	(silver) World Junior Championships (1994)	
Sergei Sakhnovski	Israel	Galit Chait	(gold) Israeli Championships (1996–98, 2000–05)	
Sergei Sakhnovski	Israel	Galit Chait	(bronze) World Championships (2002)	
András Sallay	Hungary	Krisztina Regőczy	(gold) World Championships (1980); Hungarian Championships (1972–80)	
András Sallay	Hungary	Krisztina Regőczy	(silver) Winter Olympics (1980); World Championships (1979); European Championships (1977, 1980)	
András Sallay	Hungary	Krisztina Regőczy	(bronze) World Championships (1978); European Championships (1978–79)	
Emily Samuelson	United States	Evan Bates	(gold) World Junior Championships (2008)	
Emily Samuelson	United States	Evan Bates	(silver) Junior Grand Prix Final (2006–07)	
Emily Samuelson	United States	Evan Bates	(bronze) Four Continents Championships (2009)	
April Sargent	United States	Russ Witherby	(gold) U.S. Championships (1992)	
Ramil Sarkulov	Uzbekistan	Julia Klochko	(gold) Uzbekistani Championships (2002)	
Michail Savitskiy	Germany	Darya Grimm	(bronze) World Junior Championships (2024); Junior Grand Prix Final (2023)	
Janet Sawbridge	Great Britain	Peter Dalby; David Hickinbottom; Jon Lane	(gold) British Championships (1964–65, 1972)	
Janet Sawbridge	Great Britain	Peter Dalby; David Hickinbottom; Jon Lane	(silver) World Championships (1965); European Championships (1964–65, 1969)	
Janet Sawbridge	Great Britain	Peter Dalby; David Hickinbottom; Jon Lane	(bronze) World Championships (1964, 1968); European Championships (1963, 1968, 1972)	
Massimo Scali	Italy	Federica Faiella; Flavia Ottaviani	(gold) Italian Championships (2003–05, 2007–10)	
Massimo Scali	Italy	Federica Faiella; Flavia Ottaviani	(silver) European Championships (2009–10)	
Massimo Scali	Italy	Federica Faiella; Flavia Ottaviani	(bronze) World Championships (2010); Junior Grand Prix Final (1997)	
Hendryk Schamberger	West Germany	Andrea Weppelmann	(gold) German Championships (1989, 1992–95)	
Hendryk Schamberger	Germany	Jennifer Goolsbee	(gold) German Championships (1989, 1992–95)	
Sally Schantz	United States	Stanley Urban	(gold) U.S. Championships (1963)	
Olivier Schoenfelder	France	Isabelle Delobel	(gold) World Championships (2008); European Championships (2007); Grand Prix Final (2008); French Championships (2003–08)	
Olivier Schoenfelder	France	Isabelle Delobel	(silver) European Championships (2008); World Junior Championships (1996)	
Olivier Schoenfelder	France	Isabelle Delobel	(bronze) European Championships (2005); Grand Prix Final (2007)	
Rainer Schönborn	West Germany	Petra Born	(gold) German Championships (1983–85)	
Rainer Schönborn	West Germany	Petra Born	(bronze) European Championships (1985)	
Judy Schwomeyer	United States	Jim Sladky	(gold) U.S. Championships (1968–72)	
Judy Schwomeyer	United States	Jim Sladky	(silver) World Championships (1970)	
Judy Schwomeyer	United States	Jim Sladky	(bronze) World Championships (1969, 1971–72)	
Michael Seibert	United States	Judy Blumberg	(gold) U.S. Championships (1981–85)	
Michael Seibert	United States	Judy Blumberg	(bronze) World Championships (1983–85)	
Suzanne Semanick	United States	Scott Gregory	(gold) U.S. Championships (1987–88)	
Arkadi Sergeev	Russia	Natalia Mikhailova	(silver) World Junior Championships (2006)	
Svetlana Serkeli	Soviet Union	Andrei Zharkov	(silver) World Junior Championships (1986)	
Wendy Sessions	Great Britain	Mark Reed	(gold) World Junior Championships (1977)	
Maxim Shabalin	Russia	Oksana Domnina; Elena Dostatni	(gold) World Championships (2009); European Championships (2008, 2010); Grand Prix Final (2007); Russian Championships (2005, 2007, 2010); World Junior Championships (2003); Junior Grand Prix Final (2001–02)	
Maxim Shabalin	Russia	Oksana Domnina; Elena Dostatni	(silver) European Championships (2007); Grand Prix Final (2008); World Junior Championships (2002); Junior Grand Prix Final (2000)	
Maxim Shabalin	Russia	Oksana Domnina; Elena Dostatni	(bronze) Winter Olympics (2010); Grand Prix Final (2006); World Junior Championships (2001)	
Alexander Shakalov	Uzbekistan	Olga Akimova	(gold) Uzbekistani Championships (2004–05)	
Alexander Shakalov	Ukraine	Siobhan Heekin-Canedy	(gold) Ukrainian Championships (2011)	
Elizaveta Shanaeva	Russia	Devid Naryzhnyy	(bronze) World Junior Championships (2020); Junior Grand Prix Final (2019)	
Olga Sharutenko	Russia	Dmitri Naumkin	(gold) World Junior Championships (1995)	
Linda Shearman	Great Britain	Michael Phillips	(gold) European Championships (1963); British Championships (1962–63)	
Linda Shearman	Great Britain	Michael Phillips	(silver) World Championships (1963); European Championships (1962)	
Linda Shearman	Great Britain	Michael Phillips	(bronze) European Championships (1961)	
Diane Sherbloom	United States	Larry Pierce	(gold) U.S. Championships (1961)	
Sofia Shevchenko	Russia	Igor Eremenko	(gold) Junior Grand Prix Final (2018)	
Sofia Shevchenko	Russia	Igor Eremenko	(bronze) World Junior Championships (2019)	
Alex Shibutani	United States	Maia Shibutani	(gold) Four Continents Championships (2016); U.S. Championships (2016–17)	
Alex Shibutani	United States	Maia Shibutani	(silver) World Championships (2016); Four Continents Championships (2011, 2017); World Junior Championships (2009)	
Alex Shibutani	United States	Maia Shibutani	(bronze) Winter Olympics (2018); World Championships (2011, 2017); Four Continents Championships (2015); Grand Prix Final (2016–17); Junior Grand Prix Final (2009)	
Maia Shibutani	United States	Alex Shibutani	(gold) Four Continents Championships (2016); U.S. Championships (2016–17)	
Maia Shibutani	United States	Alex Shibutani	(silver) World Championships (2016); Four Continents Championships (2011, 2017); World Junior Championships (2009)	
Maia Shibutani	United States	Alex Shibutani	(bronze) Winter Olympics (2018); World Championships (2011, 2017); Four Continents Championships (2015); Grand Prix Final (2016–17); Junior Grand Prix Final (2009)	
Gary Shortland	Great Britain	Charlotte Clements	(gold) British Championships (1998–99)	
Igor Shpilband	Soviet Union	Tatiana Gladkova	(gold) World Junior Championships (1983)	
Igor Shpilband	Soviet Union	Tatiana Gladkova	(silver) World Junior Championships (1982)	
Irina Shtork	Estonia	Taavi Rand	(gold) Estonian Championships (2010–13, 2015)	
Jamie Silverstein	United States	Justin Pekarek	(gold) World Junior Championships (1999); Junior Grand Prix Final (1998)	
Jamie Silverstein	United States	Justin Pekarek	(bronze) Four Continents Championships (2000)	
Martin Šimeček	Czech Republic	Kateřina Mrázová	(gold) Czech Championships (1994–96, 1998)	
Victoria Sinitsina	Russia	Nikita Katsalapov; Ruslan Zhiganshin	(gold) World Championships (2021); European Championships (2020, 2022); Russian Championships (2019–20); World Junior Championships (2012); Junior Grand Prix Final (2011)	
Victoria Sinitsina	Russia	Nikita Katsalapov; Ruslan Zhiganshin	(silver) Winter Olympics (2022); World Championships (2019); Grand Prix Final (2018); Junior Grand Prix Final (2010)	
Victoria Sinitsina	Russia	Nikita Katsalapov; Ruslan Zhiganshin	(bronze) Winter Olympics (2022)	
Anastasia Skoptsova	Russia	Kirill Aleshin	(gold) Winter Youth Olympics (2016); World Junior Championships (2018); Junior Grand Prix Final (2017)	
Anastasia Skoptsova	Russia	Kirill Aleshin	(bronze) Winter Youth Olympics (2016)	
Jim Sladky	United States	Judy Schwomeyer	(gold) U.S. Championships (1968–72)	
Jim Sladky	United States	Judy Schwomeyer	(silver) World Championships (1970)	
Jim Sladky	United States	Judy Schwomeyer	(bronze) World Championships (1969, 1971–72)	
Nicky Slater	Great Britain	Karen Barber; Kathryn Winter	(gold) British Championships (1985); World Junior Championships (1976)	
Nicky Slater	Great Britain	Karen Barber; Kathryn Winter	(bronze) European Championships (1983)	
Olivia Smart	Great Britain	Joseph Buckland	(gold) British Championships (2015)	
Olivia Smart	Spain	Adrián Díaz; Tim Dieck	(gold) Spanish Championships (2018, 2020, 2022, 2024)	
Stacey Smith	United States	John Summers	(gold) U.S. Championships (1978–80)	
Alexei Soloviev	Soviet Union	Elena Batanova	(gold) Soviet Championships (1984); World Junior Championships (1980–81)	
Dmitri Soloviev	Russia	Ekaterina Bobrova	(gold) Winter Olympics (2014); European Championships (2013); Russian Championships (2011–14, 2016–18); World Junior Championships (2007)	
Dmitri Soloviev	Russia	Ekaterina Bobrova	(silver) Winter Olympics (2018); European Championships (2011–12, 2018)	
Dmitri Soloviev	Russia	Ekaterina Bobrova	(bronze) World Championships (2013); European Championships (2016–17); Junior Grand Prix Final (2006)	
Nikolaj Sørensen	Denmark	Laurence Fournier Beaudry; Katelyn Good	(gold) Danish Championships (2010, 2014–15, 2018)	
Nikolaj Sørensen	Canada	Laurence Fournier Beaudry; Katelyn Good	(gold) Canadian Championships (2023)	
Nikolaj Sørensen	Canada	Laurence Fournier Beaudry; Katelyn Good	(silver) Four Continents Championships (2023–24)	
Carolane Soucisse	Canada	Shane Firus	(silver) Four Continents Championships (2018)	
Carolane Soucisse	Ireland	Shane Firus	(gold) Irish Championships (2023)	
Genrikh Sretenski	Soviet Union	Natalia Annenko	(silver) European Championships (1988)	
Genrikh Sretenski	Soviet Union	Natalia Annenko	(bronze) European Championships (1986–87, 1989)	
Deividas Stagniūnas	Lithuania	Katherine Copely; Isabella Tobias	(gold) Lithuanian Championships (2007–13)	
Maxim Staviski	Bulgaria	Albena Denkova	(gold) World Championships (2006–07); Grand Prix Final (2006); Bulgarian Championships (1992–93, 1997–2007)	
Maxim Staviski	Bulgaria	Albena Denkova	(silver) World Championships (2004); European Championships (2003–04); Grand Prix Final (2003)	
Maxim Staviski	Bulgaria	Albena Denkova	(bronze) World Championships (2003); European Championships (2007); Grand Prix Final (2002, 2004)	
Benjamin Steffan	Germany	Jennifer Janse van Rensburg	(gold) German Championships (2022–24)	
Alexandra Stepanova	Russia	Ivan Bukin	(gold) Russian Championships (2021–22, 2024); World Junior Championships (2013); Junior Grand Prix Final (2012)	
Alexandra Stepanova	Russia	Ivan Bukin	(silver) European Championships (2019, 2022); World Junior Championships (2012)	
Alexandra Stepanova	Russia	Ivan Bukin	(bronze) European Championships (2015, 2018, 2020); Junior Grand Prix Final (2010–11)	
Aliki Stergiadu	Soviet Union	Juris Razgulajevs	(gold) World Junior Championships (1991)	
Michail Stifunin	Russia	Nina Ulanova	(gold) World Junior Championships (1997)	
Evgeni Striganov	Estonia	Marina Timofeieva	(gold) Estonian Championships (2003–04)	
Yvonne Suddick	Great Britain	Malcolm Cannon; Roger Kennerson	(silver) World Championships (1968); European Championships (1966–68)	
Yvonne Suddick	Great Britain	Malcolm Cannon; Roger Kennerson	(bronze) World Championships (1967); European Championships (1964–65)	
John Summers	United States	Stacey Smith	(gold) U.S. Championships (1978–80)	
Gorsha Sur	Soviet Union	Svetlana Liapina	(silver) World Junior Championships (1985)	
Gorsha Sur	Soviet Union	Svetlana Liapina	(bronze) World Junior Championships (1984)	
Gorsha Sur	United States	Renée Roca	(gold) U.S. Championships (1993, 1995)	
Dennis Sveum	United States	Kristin Fortune	(gold) U.S. Championships (1965–66)	
Dennis Sveum	United States	Kristin Fortune	(silver) World Championships (1966)	
Alexander Svinin	Soviet Union	Olga Volozhinskaya	(silver) European Championships (1983)	
Ekaterina Svirina	Russia	Sergei Sakhnovski	(gold) World Junior Championships (1993)	
Ekaterina Svirina	Russia	Sergei Sakhnovski	(silver) World Junior Championships (1994)	
Jerod Swallow	United States	Elizabeth Punsalan	(gold) U.S. Championships (1991, 1994, 1996–98)	
Robert Swenning	United States	Kathe Mehl Williams	(gold) U.S. Championships (1945)	
Sergei Sychyov	Estonia	Anna Mosenkova	(gold) Estonian Championships (2000–02)	
Danijil Szemko	Hungary	Mariia Ignateva	(gold) Hungarian Championships (2022–24)	
Michał Szumski	Poland	Iwona Filipowicz	(bronze) World Junior Championships (1995)	
David Szurman	Czech Republic	Kateřina Kovalová	(gold) Czech Championships (2000–01)	
Daisuke Takahashi	Japan	Kana Muramoto	(gold) Japan Championships (2023)	
Daisuke Takahashi	Japan	Kana Muramoto	(silver) Four Continents Championships (2022)	
Yves Tarayre	France	Martine Olivier	(gold) French Championships (1979)	
Yves Tarayre	France	Martine Olivier	(bronze) World Junior Championships (1976)	
Filip Taschler	Czech Republic	Natálie Taschlerová	(gold) Czech Championships (2022–23)	
Natálie Taschlerová	Czech Republic	Filip Taschler	(gold) Czech Championships (2022–23)	
Peter Tchernyshev	United States	Naomi Lang	(gold) Four Continents Championships (2000, 2002); U.S. Championships (1999–2003)	
Peter Tchernyshev	United States	Naomi Lang	(silver) Four Continents Championships (2001)	
Peter Tchernyshev	United States	Naomi Lang	(bronze) Four Continents Championships (1999, 2003)	
Jasmine Tessari	Switzerland	Stéphane Walker	(gold) Swiss Championships (2022)	
Federica Testa	Italy	Christopher Mior	(gold) Italian Championships (2011)	
Federica Testa	Slovakia	Lukáš Csölley	(gold) Slovak Championships (2012, 2014–15)	
Paul Thomas	Great Britain	Nesta Davies; Pamela Weight	(gold) World Championships (1956); European Championships (1956); British Championships (1956)	
Paul Thomas	Great Britain	Nesta Davies; Pamela Weight	(silver) World Championships (1954–55); European Championships (1954–55)	
Barbara Thompson	Great Britain	Gerard Rigby	(silver) European Championships (1957)	
Barbara Thompson	Great Britain	Gerard Rigby	(bronze) World Championships (1956); European Championships (1956, 1958)	
Marina Timofeieva	Estonia	Evgeni Striganov	(gold) Estonian Championships (2003–04)	
Elizabeth Tkachenko	Israel	Alexei Kiliakov	(gold) Israeli Championships (2023)	
Elizabeth Tkachenko	Israel	Alexei Kiliakov	(silver) World Junior Championships (2024); Junior Grand Prix Final (2023)	
Ilia Tkachenko	Russia	Anastasia Gorshkova; Maria Monko	(gold) Junior Grand Prix Final (2007)	
Ilia Tkachenko	Russia	Anastasia Gorshkova; Maria Monko	(bronze) World Junior Championships (2005)	
Isabella Tobias	Lithuania	Deividas Stagniūnas	(gold) Lithuanian Championships (2011–13)	
Jayne Torvill	Great Britain	Christopher Dean	(gold) Winter Olympics (1984); World Championships (1981–84); European Championships (1981–82, 1984, 1994); British Championships (1979–84, 1994)	
Jayne Torvill	Great Britain	Christopher Dean	(bronze) Winter Olympics (1994)	
Ádám Tóth	Hungary	Krisztina Barta	(gold) Hungarian Championships (2008)	
Diane Towler	Great Britain	Bernard Ford	(gold) World Championships (1966–69); European Championships (1966–69); British Championships (1966–69)	
Taylor Tran	Lithuania	Saulius Ambrulevičius	(gold) Lithuanian Championships (2016–17)	
Nakako Tsuzuki	Japan	Rinat Farkhoutdinov	(gold) Japan Championships (1999–2001)	
Juulia Turkkila	Finland	Matthias Versluis	(gold) Finnish Championships (2019, 2022–24)	
Juulia Turkkila	Finland	Matthias Versluis	(bronze) European Championships (2023)	
Dóra Turóczi	Hungary	Balázs Major	(gold) Hungarian Championships (2014)	
Cecilia Törn	Finland	Jussiville Partanen	(gold) Finnish Championships (2016–18)	
Alper Uçar	Turkey	Alisa Agafonova; Jenette Maitz	(gold) Turkish Championships (2010, 2018)	
Nina Ulanova	Russia	Michail Stifunin	(gold) World Junior Championships (1997)	
Stanley Urban	United States	Sally Schantz	(gold) U.S. Championships (1963)	
Arina Ushakova	Russia	Maxim Nekrasov	(silver) Junior Grand Prix Final (2018)	
Arina Ushakova	Russia	Maxim Nekrasov	(bronze) World Junior Championships (2018)	
Maya Usova	Soviet Union	Alexander Zhulin	(gold) Soviet Championships (1991)	
Maya Usova	Soviet Union	Alexander Zhulin	(silver) World Championships (1989); European Championships (1989–90)	
Maya Usova	Soviet Union	Alexander Zhulin	(bronze) World Championships (1990–91); European Championships (1991)	
Maya Usova	CIS	Alexander Zhulin	(silver) World Championships (1992); European Championships (1992)	
Maya Usova	CIS	Alexander Zhulin	(bronze) Winter Olympics (1992)	
Maya Usova	Russia	Alexander Zhulin	(gold) World Championships (1993); European Championships (1993)	
Maya Usova	Russia	Alexander Zhulin	(silver) Winter Olympics (1994)	
Maya Usova	Russia	Alexander Zhulin	(bronze) European Championships (1994)	
Alexander Vakhnov	Russia	Sofia Polishchuk	(bronze) Junior Grand Prix Final (2017)	
Vitali Vakunov	Belarus	Lesia Valadzenkava	(gold) Belarusian Championships (2010–11)	
Lesia Valadzenkava	Belarus	Vitali Vakunov	(gold) Belarusian Championships (2010–11)	
Juha Valkama	Finland	Jessica Huot	(gold) Finnish Championships (2002–04)	
Povilas Vanagas	Lithuania	Margarita Drobiazko	(gold) Lithuanian Championships (1992–2002, 2005–06)	
Povilas Vanagas	Lithuania	Margarita Drobiazko	(bronze) World Championships (2000); European Championships (2000, 2006); Grand Prix Final (1999–2001)	
Ryan Van Natten	Mexico	Corenne Bruhns	(gold) Mexican Championships (2012)	
Sergei Verbillo	Ukraine	Anna Zadorozhniuk	(gold) Ukrainian Championships (2009–10)	
Matthias Versluis	Finland	Juulia Turkkila	(gold) Finnish Championships (2019, 2022–24)	
Matthias Versluis	Finland	Juulia Turkkila	(bronze) European Championships (2023)	
David Vincour	Czech Republic	Kamila Vokoun Hájková	(gold) Czech Championships (2006–10)	
Tessa Virtue	Canada	Scott Moir	(gold) Winter Olympics (2010, 2018); World Championships (2010, 2012, 2017); Four Continents Championships (2008, 2012, 2017); Grand Prix Final (2016); Canadian Championships (2008–10, 2012–14, 2017–18); World Junior Championships (2006); Junior Grand Prix Final (2005)	
Tessa Virtue	Canada	Scott Moir	(silver) Winter Olympics (2014); World Championships (2008, 2011, 2013); Four Continents Championships (2009, 2013); Grand Prix Final (2009, 2011–13, 2017); World Junior Championships (2005); Junior Grand Prix Final (2004)	
Tessa Virtue	Canada	Scott Moir	(bronze) World Championships (2009); Four Continents Championships (2006–07)	
Nikola Višňová	Slovakia	Lukáš Csölley	(gold) Slovak Championships (2009–11)	
András Visontai	Hungary	Zita Gebora	(gold) Hungarian Championships (2000–02)	
Yuri Vlasenko	Russia	Betina Popova	(bronze) Junior Grand Prix Final (2014)	
Tatiana Voitiuk	Soviet Union	Viacheslav Zhigalin	(gold) Soviet Championships (1972)	
Tatiana Voitiuk	Soviet Union	Viacheslav Zhigalin	(bronze) European Championships (1970)	
Kamila Vokoun Hájková	Czech Republic	David Vincour	(gold) Czech Championships (2006–10)	
Olga Volozhinskaya	Soviet Union	Alexander Svinin	(silver) European Championships (1983)	
Nora von Bergen	Switzerland	David DeFazio	(gold) Swiss Championships (2007)	
Oleg Voyko	Ukraine	Julia Golovina; Kristina Kobaldze	(gold) Ukrainian Championships (2000, 2003)	
Oleg Voyko	Ukraine	Julia Golovina; Kristina Kobaldze	(bronze) Junior Grand Prix Final (1999)	
Anastasia Vykhodtseva	Poland	Jan Mościcki	(gold) Polish Championships (2010)	
Bruce Waddell	Canada	Natalie D'Alessandro	(silver) World Junior Championships (2022)	
Bruce Waddell	Canada	Natalie D'Alessandro	(bronze) Winter Youth Olympics (2020)	
Louise Walden	Great Britain	Owen Edwards	(gold) British Championships (2011)	
Stéphane Walker	Switzerland	Jasmine Tessari	(gold) Swiss Championships (2022)	
Wang Chen	China	Yu Xiaoyang	(gold) Chinese Championships (2006, 2008, 2010, 2013)	
Lois Waring	United States	Walter Bainbridge; Michael McGean	(gold) U.S. Championships (1947–50, 1952)	
Nozomi Watanabe	Japan	Akiyuki Kido	(gold) Japan Championships (2004–07)	
Glyn Watts	Great Britain	Hilary Green	(gold) British Championships (1976)	
Glyn Watts	Great Britain	Hilary Green	(silver) World Championships (1974); European Championships (1974–75)	
Glyn Watts	Great Britain	Hilary Green	(bronze) World Championships (1973, 1975); European Championships (1973)	
Kaitlyn Weaver	Canada	Andrew Poje	(gold) Four Continents Championships (2010, 2015); Grand Prix Final (2014–15); Canadian Championships (2015–16, 2019)	
Kaitlyn Weaver	Canada	Andrew Poje	(silver) World Championships (2014); Four Continents Championships (2019)	
Kaitlyn Weaver	Canada	Andrew Poje	(bronze) World Championships (2015, 2018); Four Continents Championships (2012, 2016); World Junior Championships (2007)	
Pamela Weight	Great Britain	Paul Thomas	(gold) World Championships (1956); European Championships (1956); British Championships (1956)	
Pamela Weight	Great Britain	Paul Thomas	(silver) World Championships (1955); European Championships (1955)	
Jean Westwood	Great Britain	Lawrence Demmy	(gold) World Championships (1952–55); European Championships (1954–55); British Championships (1953–55)	
Charlie White	United States	Meryl Davis	(gold) Winter Olympics (2014); World Championships (2011, 2013); Four Continents Championships (2009, 2011, 2013); Grand Prix Final (2009–13); U.S. Championships (2009–14)	
Charlie White	United States	Meryl Davis	(silver) Winter Olympics (2010); World Championships (2010, 2012); Four Continents Championships (2008, 2012); Junior Grand Prix Final (2005)	
Charlie White	United States	Meryl Davis	(bronze) Winter Olympics (2014); Grand Prix Final (2008); World Junior Championships (2006)	
Tracy Wilson	Canada	Robert McCall	(gold) Canadian Championships (1982–88)	
Tracy Wilson	Canada	Robert McCall	(bronze) Winter Olympics (1988); World Championships (1986–88)	
Megan Wing	Canada	Aaron Lowe	(bronze) Four Continents Championships (2002, 2004)	
Kati Winkler	East Germany	René Lohse	(gold) East German Championships (1990)	
Kati Winkler	Germany	René Lohse	(gold) German Championships (1996, 1998–2000, 2003–04)	
Kati Winkler	Germany	René Lohse	(bronze) World Championships (2004)	
Kathryn Winter	Great Britain	Nicky Slater	(gold) World Junior Championships (1976)	
Russ Witherby	United States	April Sargent	(gold) U.S. Championships (1992)	
Katarina Wolfkostin	United States	Jeffrey Chen	(bronze) Winter Youth Olympics (2020)	
Bert Wright	United States	Sharon McKenzie	(gold) U.S. Championships (1957)	
Bert Wright	United States	Sharon McKenzie	(bronze) World Championships (1957)	
Susan Wynne	United States	Joseph Druar	(gold) U.S. Championships (1989–90)	
Xing Jianing	China	Chen Xizi	(gold) Chinese Championships (2023–24)	
Bradley Yaeger	Greece	Christa-Elizabeth Goulakos	(gold) Greek Championships (2008)	
Yang Fang	China	Gao Chongbo	(gold) Chinese Championships (2001, 2003–05)	
Yang Tae-hwa	South Korea	Chuen-Gun Lee	(gold) South Korean Championships (1999–2002)	
Anna Yanovskaya	Russia	Sergey Mozgov	(gold) Winter Youth Olympics (2012); World Junior Championships (2015); Junior Grand Prix Final (2013–14)	
Anna Yanovskaya	Russia	Sergey Mozgov	(silver) World Junior Championships (2014); Junior Grand Prix Final (2011)	
Anna Yanovskaya	Hungary	Ádám Lukács	(gold) Hungarian Championships (2019–20)	
Igor Yaroshenko	Ukraine	Irina Romanova	(gold) Ukrainian Championships (1993–98)	
Igor Yaroshenko	Ukraine	Irina Romanova	(bronze) European Championships (1996)	
Ye Quan	South Korea	Hannah Lim	(gold) South Korean Championships (2024)	
Ye Quan	South Korea	Hannah Lim	(silver) World Junior Championships (2023); Junior Grand Prix Final (2022)	
Yu Xiaoyang	China	Wang Chen	(gold) Chinese Championships (2006, 2008, 2010, 2013)	
Anna Zadorozhniuk	Ukraine	Sergei Verbillo	(gold) Ukrainian Championships (2009–10)	
Joan Zamboni	United States	Roland Junso	(gold) U.S. Championships (1956)	
Matteo Zanni	Italy	Anna Cappellini	(bronze) Junior Grand Prix Final (2004)	
Alexandra Zaretski	Israel	Roman Zaretsky	(gold) Israeli Championships (2007–09)	
Roman Zaretski	Israel	Alexandra Zaretsky	(gold) Israeli Championships (2007–09)	
Maxim Zavozin	Hungary	Nóra Hoffmann	(gold) Hungarian Championships (2009–11)	
Maxim Zavozin	United States	Morgan Matthews	(gold) World Junior Championships (2005); Junior Grand Prix Final (2004)	
Maxim Zavozin	United States	Morgan Matthews	(silver) Four Continents Championships (2006)	
Maxim Zavozin	United States	Morgan Matthews	(bronze) World Junior Championships (2004); Junior Grand Prix Final (2003)	
Kent Weigle	United States	Judi Genovesi	(gold) U.S. Championships (1977)	
Zhang Weina	China	Cao Xianming	(gold) Chinese Championships (1996–2000, 2002)	
Zheng Xun	China	Huang Xintong; Zhao Yue	(gold) Chinese Championships (2007, 2009, 2011–12, 2014, 2016)	
Viacheslav Zhigalin	Soviet Union	Tatiana Voitiuk	(gold) Soviet Championships (1972)	
Viacheslav Zhigalin	Soviet Union	Tatiana Voitiuk	(bronze) European Championships (1970)	
Ruslan Zhiganshin	Russia	Elena Ilinykh; Victoria Sinitsina	(gold) Russian Championships (2015); World Junior Championships (2012); Junior Grand Prix Final (2011)	
Ruslan Zhiganshin	Russia	Elena Ilinykh; Victoria Sinitsina	(silver) Junior Grand Prix Final (2010)	
Nelli Zhiganshina	Germany	Alexander Gazsi	(gold) German Championships (2007, 2011–15)	
Alexander Zhulin	Soviet Union	Maya Usova	(gold) Soviet Championships (1991)	
Alexander Zhulin	Soviet Union	Maya Usova	(silver) World Championships (1989); European Championships (1989–90)	
Alexander Zhulin	Soviet Union	Maya Usova	(bronze) World Championships (1990–91); European Championships (1991)	
Alexander Zhulin	CIS	Maya Usova	(silver) World Championships (1992); European Championships (1992)	
Alexander Zhulin	CIS	Maya Usova	(bronze) Winter Olympics (1992)	
Alexander Zhulin	Russia	Maya Usova	(gold) World Championships (1993); European Championships (1993)	
Alexander Zhulin	Russia	Maya Usova	(silver) Winter Olympics (1994)	
Alexander Zhulin	Russia	Maya Usova	(bronze) European Championships (1994)	
Greg Zuerlein	United States	Madison Chock	(gold) World Junior Championships (2009); Junior Grand Prix Final (2008)	
Vladimir Zuev	Ukraine	Alla Beknazarova	(gold) Ukrainian Championships (2007–08)	
Alexandra Zvorigina	Poland	Maciej Bernadowski	(gold) Polish Championships (2011–13)	
Michał Zych	Poland	Aleksandra Kauc	(gold) Polish Championships (2004–06)	

== See also ==
- List of figure skaters (men's singles)
- List of figure skaters (women's singles)
- List of figure skaters (pair skating)
