= Daniel Ryan (figure skater) =

American ice dancer and coach

Personal information
- Born: c. 1930
- Died: February 15, 1961
- Cause of death: Plane crash

Figure skating career
- Country: United States
- Partner: Carol Ann Peters
Medal record
Figure skating
Ice dancing
Representing the United States
World Championships
| Bronze medal – third place | 1953 Davos | Ice dancing |
| Bronze medal – third place | 1952 Paris | Ice dancing |
North American Championships
| Gold medal – first place | 1953 Cleveland | Ice dancing |

Daniel Ryan (born c. 1930 - died February 15, 1961) was an American ice dancer who competed with partner Carol Ann Peters.

After his competitive career ended, Ryan became a skating coach. He was en route to the World Figure Skating Championships in 1961 with his pupils, Larry Pierce and Diane Sherbloom, when their plane (Sabena Flight 548) crashed near Brussels, Belgium, killing all on board. Ryan was 30 or 31 at the time of his death.

On January 28, 2011, Ryan was inducted into the United States Figure Skating Hall of Fame as part of the 1961 U.S. World Team.

== Results ==
(with Carol Ann Peters)

| Event | 1951 | 1952 | 1953 |
|---|---|---|---|
| World Championships | | 3rd | 3rd |
| North American Championships | 2nd | | 1st |
| U.S. Championships | 3rd | 2nd | 1st |
