= Bradley Yaeger =

Canadian ice dancer (born 1985)

Personal information
- Full name: Bradley Yaeger
- Born: January 7, 1985 (age 41) Ottawa, Ontario, Canada

Figure skating career
- Country: Greece
- Partner: Christa-Elizabeth Goulakos
- Coach: Igor Tchiniaev
- Skating club: CPA Repentigny

Bradley Yaeger (born January 7, 1985, in Ottawa) is a Canadian former competitive ice dancer. He represented Greece internationally with partner Christa-Elizabeth Goulakos.

== Career ==
In August 2002, he teamed up with Mylène Girard. They are the 2003 Canadian junior silver medalists. They were two-time competitors at the Four Continents Championships, with the highest placement of 5th in 2006. They were two-season competitors on the Grand Prix of Figure Skating. They announced the end of their partnership following their withdrawal from the 2006 Cup of Russia.
