= Rod Garossino =

Canadian ice dancer

Rod Garossino (born June 7, 1963) is a Canadian retired ice dancer. Partnering his sister Karyn Garossino, he competed in the 1988 Winter Olympics and won the gold medal at the 1989 Canadian Figure Skating Championships.

Garossino was born in Didsbury, Alberta.

== Competitive highlights ==
(with Karyn Garossino)

Event	1980-81	1981-82	1982-83	1983-84	1984-85	1985-86	1986-87	1987-88	1988-89
Winter Olympic Games								12th	
World Championships					10th	9th	10th	11th	8th
World Junior Championships	3rd J								
Canadian Championships	1st J	4th	3rd	3rd	2nd	2nd	2nd	2nd	1st
Skate America			3rd						
Skate Canada International				6th	4th	4th	3rd	5th	WD
NHK Trophy						2nd			
