= Philip Askew =

English ice dancer (born 1973)

Personal information
- Born: 4 October 1973 (age 52) Mansfield, Nottinghamshire, England
- Height: 1.80 m (5 ft 11 in)

Figure skating career
- Country: Great Britain
- Skating club: Slough Ice Dance Academy

Philip Askew (born 4 October 1973) is an English former ice dancer. With partner Marika Humphreys, he won the gold medal at the 1996 and 1997 British Figure Skating Championships. They finished 17th at the World Figure Skating Championships in 1996 and 16th at the event in 1997. They missed qualifying for the 1998 Winter Olympics due to an injury and split soon afterwards.

He was a coach at Bracknell Ice Rink until the end of 1996, leaving after it emerged he had a relationship with a 16 year old skater training at the rink. He moved to Slough Ice Rink.

== Rape allegation ==
In 2015, Askew was accused of raping a girl under the age of 16 in 1995 when he was 21. The girl had been a skating student at Bracknell Ice Rink although Askew was not her coach. He denied the allegation. The case went to trial in March 2018 and was heard by a jury at Reading Crown Court. He was found not guilty.

== Results ==
(with Marika Humphreys)

International
Event	1995–96	1996–97	1997–98
World Championships	17th	16th	
European Championships	11th	15th	
CS Nations Cup		8th	
CS Skate Canada		9th	
Karl Schäfer Memorial			5th
Lysiane Lauret		3rd	
National
British Championships	1st	1st	
CS = Champions Series

(with Marie James)

International
Event	1993–94
Karl Schäfer Memorial	3rd
