= Margie Ackles =

American figure skater (1938–2019)

Margie Ackles Jones
Personal information
- Full name: Marjorie Ackles Jones
- Born: 1938
- Died: June 29, 2019 (aged 80–81)
- Home town: Inglewood, CA

Figure skating career
- Country: United States
- Discipline: Ice dance
- Partner: Charles Phillips
- Retired: 1960
- Highest WS: 4th (1959, 1960)
U.S. Championships
Gold medal – first place	1960 Seattle	Ice dance
Silver medal – second place	1959 Rochester	Ice dance

Margie Ackles Jones (1938 – June 29, 2019) was an American figure skater who competed in ice dance with Charles Phillips. The pair won the gold medal at the 1960 U.S. Figure Skating Championships.

During her competitive career, Ackles lived in Los Angeles and worked as a secretary for an engineering firm. She and Phillips were coached by William Kipp. Ackles retired from skating after the 1960 season and was engaged to be married to Ned Jones shortly afterwards. She continued to teach and coach ice dancing for years after retirement. She skated and coached with the award-winning Fabulous Forties synchronized ice dancing team for many years.

== Personal life ==
Ackles and her husband had three children: Timothy, Loreen and Randall.

== Death ==
Ackles died on June 29, 2019, at age 80.

== Competitive highlights ==
(with Phillips)

Event	1958	1959	1960
World Championships		4th	4th
U.S. Championships	4th	2nd	1st
