= Mary Parry =

Personal information
- Born: 16 October 1929
- Died: 3 March 2017 (aged 87)

Figure skating career
- Country: Great Britain
- Partner: Roy Mason
- Skating club: Birmingham Ice Dance Club
Medal record
Representing Great Britain
Figure skating: Ice dance
European Championships
Bronze medal – third place	1960 Garmisch- Partenkirchen	Ice dance

Mary A. Parry (16 October 1929 – 3 March 2017) was a British figure skater who competed in ice dancing. With partner Roy Mason, she won bronze at the 1960 European Championships in Garmisch-Partenkirchen, West Germany. Parry and Mason were both members of Birmingham Ice Dance Club and had started competing together by 1955.

Parry served as an ice dancing judge at the 1994 Winter Olympics. In her final years, she lived with Mason in Sutton Coldfield.

== Competitive highlights ==
With Roy Mason

International
Event	57–58	58–59	59–60	60–61	61–62	62–63
World Championships					9th	6th
European Championships			3rd	4th	4th	5th
National
British Championships	6th	4th	2nd		2nd	3rd
