= Andrei Zharkov =

Soviet ice dancer

Personal information
- Spouse: Svetlana Serkeli

Figure skating career
- Country: Soviet Union
- Partner: Svetlana Serkeli

Andrei Zharkov (Russian: Андрей Жарков) is a former ice dancer who represented the Soviet Union. With his wife Svetlana Serkeli, he is the 1986 World Junior silver medalist.

Serkeli and Zharkov were coached by Lyudmila Pakhomova. In late 1984, they placed fifth at the 1985 World Junior Championships in Colorado Springs, Colorado. A year later in Sarajevo, they won the silver medal behind Elena Krykanova / Evgeni Platov. In 1999, the two married and settled in Ormond Beach, Florida. Their son was born in 2004. They later moved to Cedar Hill, Texas.
