= Roy Mason (figure skater) =

British figure skater

Personal information
- Born: 13 December 1933
- Died: 10 March 2017 (aged 83)

Figure skating career
- Country: Great Britain
- Partner: Mary Parry
- Skating club: Birmingham Ice Dance Club
Medal record
Representing Great Britain
Figure skating: Ice dance
European Championships
Bronze medal – third place	1960 Garmisch- Partenkirchen	Ice dance

Roy Mason (13 December 1933 – 10 March 2017) was a British figure skater who competed in ice dancing. With partner Mary Parry, he won bronze at the 1960 European Championships in Garmisch-Partenkirchen, West Germany. Parry and Mason were both members of Birmingham Ice Dance Club and had started competing together by 1955.

Mason served as an ice dancing judge at the 1988 Winter Olympics. In his final years, he lived with Parry in Sutton Coldfield.

== Competitive highlights ==
With Mary Parry

International
Event	57–58	58–59	59–60	60–61	61–62	62–63
World Championships					9th	6th
European Championships			3rd	4th	4th	5th
National
British Championships	6th	4th	2nd		2nd	3rd
