= Vadim Karkachev =

Soviet ice dancer

Personal information
- Born: December 14, 1963 (age 62) Tula, Russian SFSR, Soviet Union

Figure skating career
- Country: Soviet Union
Medal record
Figure skating
Ice dancing
Representing Soviet Union
World Junior Championships
Gold medal – first place	1982 Oberstdorf	Ice dancing
Silver medal – second place	1981 London, ON	Ice dancing

Vadim Vladimirovich Karkachev (Russian: Вадим Владимирович Каркачёв) (born December 14, 1963) is a former Soviet ice dancer. With partner Natalia Annenko, he was the 1982 World Junior champion.

== Competitive highlights ==
(with Annenko)

Event	1981	1982
World Junior Championships	2nd	1st
