= Christiane Guhel =

French ice dancer (1932–2023)

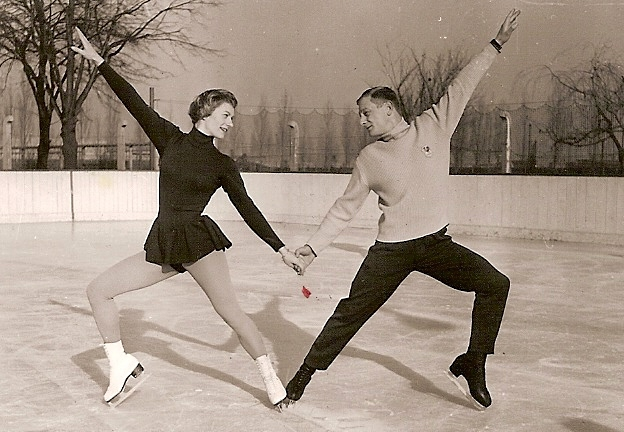
- Guhel with unknown partner

Personal information
- Full name: Christiane France Guhel
- Born: Christiane France Elien; 10 May 1932 Paris, France
- Died: 28 July 2023 (aged 91) Quincy-sous-Sénart, France

Figure skating career
- Country: France
- Partner: Jean Paul Guhel
- Retired: 1962
Medal record
Figure skating
Ice dancing
Representing France
World Championships
Silver medal – second place	1962 Prague	Ice dancing
Bronze medal – third place	1960 Vancouver	Ice dancing
European Championships
Gold medal – first place	1962 Geneva	Ice dancing
Silver medal – second place	1961 West Berlin	Ice dancing
Silver medal – second place	1960 Garmisch-Partenkirchen	Ice dancing
Bronze medal – third place	1959 Davos	Ice dancing

Christiane France Guhel (née Elien; 10 May 1932 – 28 July 2023) was a French ice dancer. With her husband Jean Paul Guhel, she was the 1962 European champion, 1962 World silver medalist, and 1960 World bronze medalist.

Guhel died in Quincy-sous-Sénart on 28 July 2023, at the age of 91.

== Results ==
=== Ice Dance ===
(with Jean Paul Guhel)

Event	1958	1959	1960	1961	1962
World Championships	6th	6th	3rd		2nd
European Championships	4th	3rd	2nd	2nd	1st
French Championships	1st	1st	1st	1st	1st
