= Sharon McKenzie =

American ice dancer

Personal information
- Full name: Sharon McKenzie
- Other names: Sharon Nix
- Born: May 16, 1937 (age 89) Los Angeles
- Home town: Los Angeles
- Height: 5 ft 2 in (157 cm)

Figure skating career
- Country: United States
- Partner: Bert Wright
- Coach: Bill Kip
- Skating club: Los Angeles FSC
Medal record
Figure skating
Ice dancing
Representing the United States
World Championships
Bronze medal – third place	1957 Colorado Springs	Ice dancing
North American Championships
Bronze medal – third place	1957 Rochester	Ice dancing

Sharon McKenzie (born May 16, 1937) is an American ice dancer. With partner Bert Wright, she is the 1957 U.S. national champion. They won the bronze medal at the 1957 World Figure Skating Championships.

== Results ==
(with Bert Wright)

Event	1957
World Championships	3rd
North American Championships	3rd
U.S. Championships	1st
