= Christa-Elizabeth Goulakos =

Canadian ice dancer (born 1988)

Christa-Elizabeth Goulakos (born March 3, 1988, in Montreal, Quebec) is a Canadian former competitive ice dancer who represented Greece internationally. She competed with Bradley Yaeger.

In the 2006–2007 season, she competed with Eric Neumann-Aubichon. They represented Greece at the 2007 European Figure Skating Championships and the 2007 World Figure Skating Championships.
