= Svetlana Serkeli =

Soviet ice dancer

Personal information
- Born: 1967 or 1968

Figure skating career
- Country: Soviet Union
- Partner: Andrei Zharkov

Svetlana Serkeli (Russian: Светлана Серкели) is a former ice dancer who represented the Soviet Union. With her husband Andrei Zharkov, she is the 1986 World Junior silver medalist.

Serkeli was born around 1967 or 1968 and spent her early years in Odessa. She and Zharkov were coached by Lyudmila Pakhomova. In late 1984, they placed fifth at the 1985 World Junior Championships in Colorado Springs, Colorado. A year later in Sarajevo, they won the silver medal behind Elena Krykanova / Evgeni Platov.

In 1986, Serkeli married Russian gymnast Dmitry Bilozerchev but their marriage ended after a few years. In 1999, she married Zharkov and settled with him in Ormond Beach, Florida. Their son was born in 2004. They later moved to Cedar Hill, Texas. They now are coaches in the Ice at the Parks Arlington, TX
