= Carol Ann Peters =

American figure skater (1932–2022)

Carol Peters Duncan
Personal information
- Born: June 16, 1932 Buffalo, New York, U.S.
- Died: May 16, 2022 (aged 89) Bethesda, Maryland, U.S.

Figure skating career
- Country: United States
- Partner: Daniel Ryan
Medal record
Figure skating
Ice dancing
Representing the United States
World Championships
Bronze medal – third place	1953 Davos	Ice dancing
Bronze medal – third place	1952 Paris	Ice dancing
North American Championships
Gold medal – first place	1953 Cleveland	Ice dancing

Carol Ann Peters Duncan (June 16, 1932 – May 16, 2022) was an American figure skater who competed in ice dancing. Her skating partner was Daniel Ryan.

She had 19 grandchildren.

== Results ==
(with Daniel Ryan)

Event	1951	1952	1953
World Championships		3rd	3rd
North American Championships	2nd		1st
U.S. Championships	3rd	2nd	1st
