= Bert Wright (figure skater) =

American ice dancer

Personal information
- Full name: Bert Wright

Figure skating career
- Country: United States
- Partner: Sharon McKenzie
- Skating club: Los Angeles FSC
Medal record
Figure skating
Ice dancing
Representing the United States
World Championships
Bronze medal – third place	1957 Colorado Springs	Ice dancing
North American Championships
Bronze medal – third place	1957 Rochester	Ice dancing

Bert Wright is an American ice dancer. With partner Sharon McKenzie, he is the 1957 U.S. national champion. They won the bronze medal at the 1957 World Figure Skating Championships.

== Results ==
(with Sharon McKenzie)

Event	1957
World Championships	3rd
North American Championships	3rd
U.S. Championships	1st
