= Ekaterina Davydova =

Russian ice dancer

Personal information
- Full name: Ekaterina Alexeyevna Davydova
- Born: 17 September 1978 (age 47) Moscow, Russian SFSR, Soviet Union

Figure skating career
- Country: Russia
- Retired: 1998
Medal record
Representing Russia
Figure skating: Ice dancing
World Junior Championships
Gold medal – first place	1996 Brisbane	Ice dancing

Ekaterina Alexeyevna Davydova (Russian: Екатерина Алексеевна Давыдова, born 17 September 1978) is a Russian former competitive ice dancer. She is the 1996 World Junior champion with Roman Kostomarov. She also skated with Vazgen Azroyan.

== Competitive highlights ==
GP: Part of Champions Series (renamed Grand Prix in 1998)

=== With Kostomarov ===
International
Event	1992–93	1994–95	1995–96	1996–97	1997–98
GP Cup of Russia				5th	
Finlandia Trophy					2nd
Karl Schäfer Memorial					2nd
Winter Universiade				WD	
International: Junior
World Junior Champ.	10th	7th	1st		
National
Russian Champ.				3rd	
WD: Withdrew

=== With Azrojan ===
International
Event	1993–94
World Junior Championships	9th
