= Karyn Garossino =

Canadian ice dancer

Karyn Garossino (born June 7, 1965 in Didsbury, Alberta) is a former Canadian ice dancer. With her brother Rod Garossino, she competed in the 1988 Winter Olympics and won the gold medal at the 1989 Canadian Figure Skating Championships.

== Competitive highlights ==
(with Rod Garossino)

Event	1980-81	1981-82	1982-83	1983-84	1984-85	1985-86	1986-87	1987-88	1988-89
Winter Olympic Games								12th	
World Championships					10th	9th	10th	11th	8th
World Junior Championships	3rd J								
Canadian Championships	1st J	4th	3rd	3rd	2nd	2nd	2nd	2nd	1st
Skate America			3rd						
Skate Canada International				6th	4th	4th	3rd	5th	WD
NHK Trophy						2nd			

== Life after skating ==
After her skating career was over, Garossino moved to Calgary, AB, where she got into the profession of performance coaching with other athletes. After five years there, she moved to British Columbia. She is the aunt of producer, singer and artist Claire Boucher, also known as Grimes.
