= Hynek Bílek =

Czech ice dancer

Personal information
- Born: 25 December 1981 (age 44) Olomouc, Czechoslovakia
- Height: 1.74 m (5 ft 8 1/2 in)

Figure skating career
- Country: Slovakia; Czech Republic
- Discipline: Ice dance
- Skating club: Iskra Banska Bystrica
- Began skating: 1985
- Retired: 2005

Medal record
Representing Slovakia
Slovak Championships
Gold medal – first place	2004 Bratislava	Ice dance

Hynek Bílek (born 25 December 1981 in Olomouc) is a Czech former ice dancer.

== Career ==
With partner Lucie Kadlčáková representing the Czech Republic, he placed as high as 10th at the World Junior Championships and won three ISU Junior Grand Prix medals. Bílek teamed up with Ivana Dlhopolčeková around 2003. Representing Slovakia, they won senior international medals at the 2004 Golden Spin of Zagreb, Ondrej Nepela Memorial, and Pavel Roman Memorial.

== Controversy ==
Following retirement from competition, Bílek worked at an Olomouc branch of the Komerční banka. However, in June 2010, he was sentenced to six years in prison for defrauding clients of 15 million Czech koruna.

== Programs ==
=== With Dlhopolčeková ===
Season	Original dance	Free dance
2004–2005	Foxtror: Standard Dances; Quickstep: Aladdin	Roméo et Juliette by Gerard Presgurvic

=== With Kadlčáková ===
Season	Original dance	Free dance
2001–2002	Paso Doble; Tango	Eldorado by Elton John
2000–2001	Good Morning by A. Tred; Singing in the Rain by N. H. Brown	Jurassic Park by John Williams; Xotica by René Dupéré

== Competitive highlights ==
=== With Dlhopolčeková for Slovakia ===
Results
International
Event	2003–2004	2004–2005
Golden Spin of Zagreb		3rd
Nebelhorn Trophy		6th
Ondrej Nepela Memorial		3rd
Pavel Roman Memorial		2nd
National
Slovak Championships	1st	

=== With Kadlčáková for the Czech Republic ===
Results
International
Event	1997–98	1998–99	1999–00	2000–01	2001–02
Junior Worlds		23rd	13th	10th	20th
JGP Czech			3rd	3rd	
JGP France				2nd	
JGP Italy					10th
JGP Netherlands					6th
JGP Norway			7th		
Grand Prize SNP			1st J.		
National
Czech Champ.	4th J.	1st J.	1st J.	1st J.	
