= Jean Paul Guhel =

French ice dancer (1930–1988)

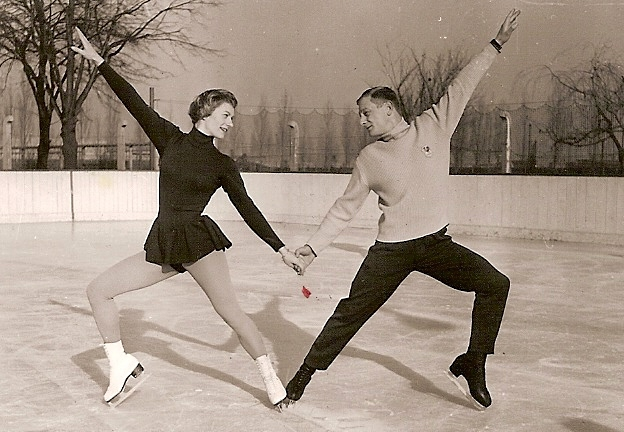

Personal information
- Full name: Jean Paul Guhel
- Born: 15 June 1930 Auray, France
- Died: 1 February 1988 (aged 57) Ploemel, France

Figure skating career
- Country: France
- Retired: 1962
Medal record
Figure skating
Ice dancing
Representing France
World Championships
Silver medal – second place	1962 Prague	Ice dancing
Bronze medal – third place	1960 Vancouver	Ice dancing
European Championships
Gold medal – first place	1962 Geneva	Ice dancing
Silver medal – second place	1961 West Berlin	Ice dancing
Silver medal – second place	1960 Garmisch-Partenkirchen	Ice dancing
Bronze medal – third place	1959 Davos	Ice dancing

Jean Paul Guhel (15 June 1930 – 1 February 1988) was a French ice dancer. With his wife Christiane Guhel, he was the 1962 European champion, 1962 World silver medalist, and 1960 World bronze medalist.

Guhel died in Ploemel on 1 February 1988, at the age of 57.

== Results ==
=== Ice Dance ===
(with Christiane Duvois)

Event	1953
French Championships	2nd

(with Fanny Besson)

Event	1954	1955	1956	1957
French Championships	1st	1st	1st	1st

(with Christiane Guhel)

Event	1958	1959	1960	1961	1962
World Championships	6th	6th	3rd		2nd
European Championships	4th	3rd	2nd	2nd	1st
French Championships	1st	1st	1st	1st	1st
