= Ivana Dlhopolčeková =

Slovak ice dancer

Personal information
- Born: 1 June 1986 (age 40) Banská Bystrica, Czechoslovakia
- Height: 1.65 m (5 ft 5 in)

Figure skating career
- Country: [Slovakia
- Discipline: Ice dance
- Began skating: 1992
- Retired: 2005

Medal record
Slovak Championships
Gold medal – first place	2004 Bratislava	Ice dance

Ivana Dlhopolčeková (born 1 June 1986) is a Slovak former ice dancer. She teamed up with partner Hynek Bílek around 2003. They won senior international medals at the 2004 Golden Spin of Zagreb, Ondrej Nepela Memorial, and Pavel Roman Memorial.

== Programs ==
(with Bílek)

Season	Original dance	Free dance
2004–2005	Foxtror: Standard Dances; Quickstep: Aladdin	Roméo et Juliette by Gerard Presgurvic

== Competitive highlights ==
(with Bílek)

Results
International
Event	2003–2004	2004–2005
Golden Spin of Zagreb		3rd
Nebelhorn Trophy		6th
Ondrej Nepela Memorial		3rd
Pavel Roman Memorial		2nd
National
Slovak Championships	1st	
