= Mary Campbell (figure skater) =

American ice dancer

Personal information
- Full name: Mary Karen Campbell

Figure skating career
- Country: United States
Medal record
Representing the United States
Figure skating: Ice dancing
North American Championships
Bronze medal – third place	1971 Peterborough	Ice dancing

Mary Karen Campbell is an American former competitive ice dancer. With her skating partner, Johnny Johns, she became the 1971 North American bronze medalist, 1972 Nebelhorn Trophy champion, and 1973 U.S. national champion.

== Results ==
Ice dance with Johns:

International
Event	69–70	70–71	71–72	72–73
World Championships		10th	10th	6th
North American Champ.		3rd		
Nebelhorn Trophy				1st
National
U.S. Championships	6th	3rd	3rd	1st
