= Larry Pierce (figure skater) =

American ice dancer

Personal information
- Full name: Dallas Larry Pierce
- Born: 1937 Indianapolis, Indiana, United States
- Died: February 15, 1961 (age 24) Berg-Kampenhout, Flemish Brabant, Belgium
- Cause of death: Plane crash

Figure skating career
- Country: United States

Dallas "Larry" Pierce (1937 – February 15, 1961) was an American ice dancer. He was the 1961 U.S. national champion with Diane Sherbloom.

== Life and career ==
Born to Dallas and Nellie Pierce, Larry Pierce had an elder sister, Jan, and younger brother, Russell. He graduated from Broad Ripple High School and then attended Indiana University for two years. He then joined the United States Marine Corps Reserve. He later worked at his family's plumbing business in Indianapolis, Indiana. He wore dark-rimmed glasses, even on the ice, and was known among friends for his sense of humor.

After graduating from high school, he was partnered with Marilyn Meeker, who also attended Broad Ripple High School, by coach Danny Ryan at the Winter Club of Indianapolis. Junior bronze medalists at the 1958 U.S. Championships, they won the junior title at the 1959 U.S. Championships. Meeker/Pierce also trained in Cobourg, Ontario, and Lake Placid, New York, during summers. Competing on the senior level, they won the silver medal at the 1960 U.S. Championships and placed fifth at the 1960 World Championships. Meeker broke her ankle in training in December 1960, six weeks before the 1961 U.S. Championships.

Ryan asked Diane Sherbloom, who had not intended to compete that season, to skate with Pierce, and Pierce's parents succeeded in persuading Sherbloom's. Sherbloom/Pierce won the gold medal at Nationals in Colorado Springs, Colorado, and were named in the U.S. team to the 1961 World Championships. En route to the event, their plane, Sabena Flight 548, crashed near Brussels, Belgium, killing all on board. Pierce was 24 at the time of his death.

He is buried at Washington Park East Cemetery, Indianapolis, Indiana.

On January 28, 2011, Pierce was inducted into the United States Figure Skating Hall of Fame as part of the 1961 U.S. World Team.

== Results ==
(with Marilyn Meeker)

Event	1958	1959	1960
World Championships			5th
U.S. Championships	3rd J.	1st J.	2nd
J. = Junior level

(with Diane Sherbloom)

Event	1961
North American Championships	4th
U.S. Championships	1st
