= Diane Sherbloom =

American ice dancer

Personal information
- Full name: Diane Carol Sherbloom
- Born: September 21, 1942 Los Angeles, California, US
- Died: February 15, 1961 (aged 18) Berg-Kampenhout, Flemish Brabant, Belgium
- Cause of death: Plane crash

Diane Carol "Dee Dee" Sherbloom (September 21, 1942 – February 15, 1961) was an American figure skater who competed in ice dance. Previously paired with Roger Campbell, she had no intentions of competing at the 1961 United States Figure Skating Championships until she met her partner Larry Pierce. Pierce's previous partner, Marilyn Meeker, suffered an injury shortly before the championships that made her unable to compete, and Pierce persuaded Sherbloom to join him. The newly formed pair went on to win the gold medal at Nationals and followed that up with a fourth-place finish at the North American Figure Skating Championships.

Pierce and Sherbloom were en route to the World Championships in 1961 when their plane (Sabena Flight 548) crashed near Brussels, Belgium, killing all on board. She was 18 at the time of her death and was buried at the Holy Cross Cemetery in Culver City, California.

On January 28, 2011, Sherbloom was inducted into the United States Figure Skating Hall of Fame as part of the 1961 U.S. World Team.

== Results ==
(with Larry Pierce)

Event	1961
North American Championships	4th
U.S. Championships	1st
