= 1987 World Figure Skating Championships =

Annual figure skating competition held in 1987

- Type: ISU Championship
- Date: March 10 – 15
- Season: 1986–87
- Location: Cincinnati, USA
- Venue: Riverfront Coliseum

Champions
- Men's singles: (Canada) Brian Orser
- Ladies' singles: (East Germany) Katarina Witt
- Pairs: (Soviet Union) Ekaterina Gordeeva / Sergei Grinkov
- Ice dance: (Soviet Union) Natalia Bestemianova / Andrei Bukin
- Previous: 1986 World Championships
- Next: 1988 World Championships

The 1987 World Figure Skating Championships were held at the Riverfront Coliseum in Cincinnati, USA from March 10 to 15. Medals were awarded in men's singles, ladies' singles, pair skating, and ice dancing.

== Medal tables ==
=== Medalists ===
Discipline	Gold	Silver	Bronze
Men	(Canada) Brian Orser	(United States) Brian Boitano	(Soviet Union) Alexander Fadeev
Ladies	(East Germany) Katarina Witt	(United States) Debi Thomas	(United States) Caryn Kadavy
Pairs	(Soviet Union) Ekaterina Gordeeva / Sergei Grinkov	(Soviet Union) Elena Valova / Oleg Vasiliev	(United States) Jill Watson / Peter Oppegard
Ice dancing	(Soviet Union) Natalia Bestemianova / Andrei Bukin	(Soviet Union) Marina Klimova / Sergei Ponomarenko	(United States) Karla Johnson / Michael Boggio

=== Medals by country ===
Rank	Nation	Gold	Silver	Bronze	Total
1	Soviet Union (URS)	2	2	1	5
2	Canada (CAN)	1	0	1	2
3	East Germany (GDR)	1	0	0	1
4	United States (USA)	0	2	2	4
Totals (4 entries)		4	4	4	12

== Results ==
=== Men ===
Rank	Name	Nation	TFP	CF	OP	FS
1	Brian Orser	Canada	3.2	3	1	1
2	Brian Boitano	United States	4.0	2	2	2
3	Alexander Fadeev	Soviet Union	4.8	1	3	3
4	Vladimir Kotin	Soviet Union	10.4	4	5	6
5	Grzegorz Filipowski	Poland	11.6	7	6	5
6	Viktor Petrenko	Soviet Union	11.6	5	4	7
7	Christopher Bowman	United States	14.2	11	9	4
8	Petr Barna	Czechoslovakia	17.8	10	7	9
9	Richard Zander	West Germany	20.0	6	11	12
10	Scott Williams	United States	21.6	9	8	13
11	Makoto Kano	Japan	22.2	17	10	8
12	Masaru Ogawa	Japan	22.8	12	14	10
13	Falko Kirsten	East Germany	25.2	13	16	11
14	Oliver Höner	Switzerland	27.6	8	17	16
15	Kurt Browning	Canada	30.0	14	19	14
16	Lars Dresler	Denmark	32.2	20	13	15
17	Paul Robinson	United Kingdom	33.6	18	12	18
18	Philippe Roncoli	France	34.0	15	20	17
19	Alessandro Riccitelli	Italy	36.6	16	15	21
20	Michael Slipchuk	Canada	39.8	19	21	20
21	Peter Johansson	Sweden	41.2	25	18	19
22	Cameron Medhurst	Australia	45.0	23	23	22
23	Oula Jääskeläinen	Finland	45.8	22	24	23
24	Oliver Dechert	West Germany	46.6	21	25	24
Free skating not reached
25	Boyko Aleksiev	Bulgaria		26	22	
26	Tomislav Cizmesija	Yugoslavia		24	26	
27	Chi-Man Wong	Hong Kong		27	27	

=== Ladies ===
Rank	Name	Nation	TFP	CF	OP	FS
1	Katarina Witt	East Germany	4.4	5	1	1
2	Debi Thomas	United States	6.0	2	7	2
3	Caryn Kadavy	United States	7.4	4	5	3
4	Elizabeth Manley	Canada	10.4	6	2	6
5	Kira Ivanova	Soviet Union	12.0	1	6	9
6	Claudia Leistner	West Germany	13.0	3	8	8
7	Jill Trenary	United States	13.2	11	4	5
8	Midori Ito	Japan	13.6	14	3	4
9	Anna Kondrashova	Soviet Union	14.8	7	9	7
10	Joanne Conway	United Kingdom	20.8	10	12	10
11	Patricia Schmidt	Canada	20.8	8	10	12
12	Susanne Becher	West Germany	23.6	9	18	11
13	Claudia Villiger	Switzerland	25.8	12	14	13
14	Agnès Gosselin	France	28.2	13	16	14
15	Iveta Voralova	Czechoslovakia	31.0	18	13	15
16	Željka Čižmešija	Yugoslavia	34.2	16	19	17
17	Beatrice Gelmini	Italy	35.2	22	15	16
18	Tracy-Lee Brook	Australia	36.8	20	17	18
19	Elina Hanninen	Finland	39.8	19	21	20
20	Yvonne Pokorny	Austria	40.0	17	22	21
21	Helene Persson	Sweden	40.8	23	20	19
22	Chi Hyun-jung	South Korea	43.8	21	23	22
23	Sandra Escoda	Spain	47.6	25	24	23
WD	Tamara Téglássy	Hungary		15	11	
Free skating not reached
25	Pauline Lee	Chinese Taipei		24	26	
26	Petya Gavazova	Bulgaria		26	25	
27	Edith Poon	Hong Kong		27	27	

=== Pairs ===
Rank	Name	Nation	TFP	SP	FS
1	Ekaterina Gordeeva / Sergei Grinkov	Soviet Union	1.4	1	1
2	Elena Valova / Oleg Vasiliev	Soviet Union	2.8	2	2
3	Jill Watson / Peter Oppegard	United States	4.2	3	3
4	Larisa Selezneva / Oleg Makarov	Soviet Union	6.8	7	4
5	Denise Benning / Lyndon Johnston	Canada	7.4	6	5
6	Cynthia Coull / Mark Rowsom	Canada	7.6	4	6
7	Gillian Wachsman / Todd Waggoner	United States	10.0	5	8
8	Christine Hough / Doug Ladret	Canada	11.2	8	7
9	Cheryl Peake / Andrew Naylor	United Kingdom	12.6	9	9
10	Lenka Knapová / René Novotný	Czechoslovakia	14.0	10	10
11	Sonja Adalbert / Daniel Caprano	West Germany	14.8	12	11
12	Danielle Carr / Stephen Carr	Australia	16.4	11	12
13	Shuk-Ching Ngai / Cheuk-Fai Lai	Hong Kong	18.2	13	13

=== Ice dancing ===
Rank	Name	Nation	TFP	CD	OSP	FD
1	Natalia Bestemianova / Andrei Bukin	Soviet Union	2.4	1	2	1
2	Marina Klimova / Sergei Ponomarenko	Soviet Union	3.6	2	1	2
3	Tracy Wilson / Robert McCall	Canada	6.0	3	3	3
4	Natalia Annenko / Genrikh Sretenski	Soviet Union	8.0	4	4	4
5	Suzanne Semanick / Scott Gregory	United States	10.0	5	5	5
6	Kathrin Beck / Christoff Beck	Austria	12.0	6	6	6
7	Antonia Becherer / Ferdinand Becherer	West Germany	14.0	7	7	7
8	Klára Engi / Attila Tóth	Hungary	16.0	8	8	8
9	Isabelle Duchesnay / Paul Duchesnay	France	18.6	10	9	9
10	Karyn Garossino / Rod Garossino	Canada	20.4	9	10	11
11	Lia Trovati / Roberto Pelizzola	Italy	21.0	11	11	10
12	Susie Wynne / Joseph Druar	United States	24.4	12	13	12
13	Sharon Jones / Paul Askham	United Kingdom	25.6	13	12	13
14	Michela Malingambi / Andrea Gilardi	Italy	28.0	14	14	14
15	Honorata Górna / Andrzej Dostatni	Poland	31.0	16	16	15
16	Tomoko Tanaka / Hiroyuki Suzuki	Japan	31.0	15	15	16
17	Jo Ann Borlase / Scott Chalmers	Canada	34.0	17	17	17
18	Andrea Weppelmann / Hendryk Schamberger	West Germany	36.0	18	18	18
19	Monica MacDonald / Rodney Clarke	Australia	38.6	20	19	19
20	Susanna Rahkamo / Petri Kokko	Finland	39.8	19	21	20
21	Hristina Boyanova / Yavor Ivanov	Bulgaria	41.6	21	20	21
22	Park Kyung-sook / Han Seung-jong	South Korea	44.0	22	22	22
