= 1988 European Figure Skating Championships =

Figure skating competition

1988 European Championships
- Type: ISU Championship
- Date: January 12 – 17
- Season: 1987–88
- Location: Prague, Czechoslovakia
- Venue: Sportovní hala

Champions
- Men's singles: (Soviet Union) Alexander Fadeev
- Ladies' singles: (East Germany) Katarina Witt
- Pairs: (Soviet Union) Ekaterina Gordeeva / Sergei Grinkov
- Ice dance: (Soviet Union) Natalia Bestemianova / Andrei Bukin
- Previous: 1987 European Championships
- Next: 1989 European Championships

The 1988 European Figure Skating Championships was a senior-level international competition held in Prague, Czechoslovakia (present-day Czech Republic) on January 22–27, 1988. Elite skaters from European ISU member nations competed in the disciplines of men's singles, ladies' singles, pair skating, and ice dancing.

== Results ==
=== Men ===
Fadeev attempted but missed a quadruple jump but was able to win. The podium was the same as the previous year.

Rank	Name	Nation	TFP	CF	SP	FS	S+F
1	Alexander Fadeev	Soviet Union	2.0	1	1	1	1
2	Vladimir Kotin	Soviet Union	5.4	2	3	3	3
3	Viktor Petrenko	Soviet Union	5.8	5	2	2	2
4	Grzegorz Filipowski	Poland	8.4	4	5	4	4
5	Richard Zander	West Germany	11.2	6	4	6	5
6	Heiko Fischer	West Germany	11.2	3	6	7	7
7	Petr Barna	Czechoslovakia	12.6	8	7	5	6
8	Oliver Höner	Switzerland	15.4	7	8	8	8
9	Paul Robinson	United Kingdom	20.8	13	10	9	9
10	Axel Médéric	France	23.8	12	9	13	10
11	Frédéric Lipka	France	24.0	10	20	10	12
12	Alessandro Riccitelli	Italy	27.4	11	17	14	15
13	András Száraz	Hungary	27.6	15	19	11	13
14	Ralf Burghart	Austria	27.6	9	13	17	17
15	Peter Johansson	Sweden	28.8	20	12	12	11
16	Oula Jääskeläinen	Finland	30.6	17	11	16	14
17	Michael Huth	East Germany	34.0	21	16	15	16
18	Rico Krahnert	East Germany	35.0	19	14	18	18
19	Henrik Walentin	Denmark	35.8	18	15	19	19
20	Jaroslav Suchý	Czechoslovakia	39.0	16	21	21	21
21	Tomislav Čižmešija	Yugoslavia	39.6	14	23	22	22
22	Cornel Gheorghe	Romania	41.0	23	18	20	20
23	Przemysław Noworyta	Poland	45.0	22	22	23	23
24	Fernando Soria	Spain	48.0	24	24	24	24

Panel of Judges
Referee : Ms. Sonia Bianchetti
Assistant Referee : Ms. Dagmar Reháková
Judge N°1 : Ms. Anett Witt (East Germany)
Judge N°2 : Ms. Josette Betsch (France)
Judge N°3 : Ms. Linda Peterson (Denmark)
Judge N°4 : Ms. Maria Zuchowicz (Poland)
Judge N°5 : Ms. Julianna Beke (Hungary)
Judge N°6 : Mr. Walter Hüttner (Austria)
Judge N°7 : Mr. Ante Skrtic (Socialist Federal Republic of Yugoslavia)
Judge N°8 : Ms. Maya Reinhart (Switzerland)
Judge N°9 : Mr. Alexandr Vedenin (Soviet Union)
Substitute : Ms. Ingrid Reetz (West Germany)

=== Ladies ===
Rank	Name	Nation	TFP	CF	SP	FS	S+F
1	Katarina Witt	East Germany	2.8	2	1	1	1
2	Kira Ivanova	Soviet Union	4.4	1	2	3	3
3	Anna Kondrashova	Soviet Union	5.0	3	3	2	2
4	Claudia Leistner	West Germany	9.8	4	6	5	5
5	Simone Koch	East Germany	12.2	11	4	4	4
6	Natalia Gorbenko	Soviet Union	15.8	6	13	7	8
7	Agnès Gosselin	France	16.6	8	7	9	7
8	Tamara Téglássy	Hungary	17.8	9	11	8	9
9	Marina Kielmann	West Germany	18.2	17	5	6	6
10	Joanne Conway	United Kingdom	20.6	5	14	12	12
11	Iveta Voralova	Czechoslovakia	26.0	13	18	11	14
12	Stefanie Schmid	Switzerland	26.2	16	9	13	10
13	Beatrice Gelmini	Italy	26.6	15	19	10	11
14	Katrien Pauwels	Belgium	27.0	7	17	16	17
15	Mirela Gawłowska	Poland	28.4	12	8	18	15
16	Claude Péri	France	30.0	20	10	14	13
17	Željka Čižmešija	Yugoslavia	30.8	10	12	20	19
18	Lotta Falkenbäck	Sweden	31.4	14	15	17	18
19	Petra Vonmoos	Switzerland	35.2	23	16	15	16
20	Yvonne Pokorny	Austria	38.6	18	22	19	20
21	Anisette Torp-Lind	Denmark	42.2	22	20	21	21
22	Katerina Novakova	Czechoslovakia	42.8	19	21	23	23
23	Elina Hanninen	Finland	43.8	21	23	22	22
24	Eva Plaszko	Hungary	48.6	25	24	24	24
Final Not Reached
25	Marta Olozagarre	Spain		24	26		
26	Anita Thorenfeldt	Norway		26	25		
27	Asia Alexieva	Bulgaria		27	27		

Panel of Judges
Referee : Benjamin T. Wright
Assistant Referee : Tjasa Andrée
Judge N°1 : Mr. Radovan Lipovscak (Socialist Federal Republic of Yugoslavia)
Judge N°2 : Mr. Jan Olesinski (Poland)
Judge N°3 : Ms. Marianne Overby (Sweden)
Judge N°4 : Ms. Hely Abbondati (Finland)
Judge N°5 : Ms. Raffaella Locatelli (Italy)
Judge N°6 : Ms. Judit Fürst (Hungary)
Judge N°7 : Mr. Reinhard Mirmseker (East Germany)
Judge N°8 : Ms. Evgenia Bogdanova (Soviet Union)
Judge N°9 : Ms. Eva von Gramm (West Germany)
Substitute : Ms. Berit Aarnes (Norway)

=== Pairs ===
Rank	Name	Nation	TFP	SP	FS
1	Ekaterina Gordeeva / Sergei Grinkov	Soviet Union	1.4	1	1
2	Larisa Selezneva / Oleg Makarov	Soviet Union	2.8	2	2
3	Peggy Schwarz / Alexander König	East Germany	4.2	3	3
4	Natalia Mishkutenok / Artur Dmitriev	Soviet Union	5.6	4	4
5	Mandy Wötzel / Axel Rauschenbach	East Germany	7.4	6	5
6	Lenka Knapová / René Novotný	Czechoslovakia	8.0	5	6
7	Brigitte Groh / Holger Maletz	West Germany	9.8	7	7
8	Cheryl Peake / Andrew Naylor	United Kingdom	11.2	8	8
9	Anuschka Gläser / Stefan Pfrengle	West Germany	12.6	9	9
10	Lisa Cushley / Neil Cushley	United Kingdom	14.0	10	10
11	Dagmar Kovářová / Karel Kovář	Czechoslovakia	15.4	11	11

Panel of Judges
Referee : Mr. Jürg Wilhelm
Assistant Referee : Mr. Gerhardt Bubnik
Judge N°1 : Mr. Jan Olesinski (Poland)
Judge N°2 : Ms. Eija-Leena Heino (Finland)
Judge N°3 : Mr. Václav Skála (Czech Republic)
Judge N°4 : Ms. Monique Petit (France)
Judge N°5 : Ms. Eva von Gamm (West Germany)
Judge N°6 : Mr. Alexander Penchev (Bulgaria)
Judge N°7 : Mr. Günter Teichmann (East Germany)
Judge N°8 : Mr. Mikhail Drei (Soviet Union)
Judge N°9 : Ms. Wendy Utley (United Kingdom)
Substitute : Mr. Peter Moser (Switzerland)

=== Ice dancing ===
Rank	Name	Nation	TFP	CD	OSP	FD
1	Natalia Bestemianova / Andrei Bukin	Soviet Union	2.0	1	1	1
2	Natalia Annenko / Genrikh Sretenski	Soviet Union	4.0	2	2	2
3	Isabelle Duchesnay / Paul Duchesnay	France	7.6	5	4	3
4	Maya Usova / Alexander Zhulin	Soviet Union	7.6	4	3	4
5	Kathrin Beck / Christoff Beck	Austria	8.4	3	4	5
6	Klára Engi / Attila Tóth	Hungary	12.0	6	6	6
7	Lia Trovati / Roberto Pelizzola	Italy	14.0	7	7	7
8	Sharon Jones / Paul Askham	United Kingdom	16.6	9	8	8
9	Viera Řeháková / Ivan Havránek	Czechoslovakia	18.6	10	9	9
10	Corinne Paliard / Didier Courtois	France	20.6	11	10	10
11	Stefania Calegari / Pasquale Camerlengo	Italy	22.6	12	11	11
12	Honorata Górna / Andrzej Dostatni	Poland	24.6	13	12	12
13	Andrea Juklova / Martin Šimeček	Czechoslovakia	26.6	14	13	13
14	Andrea Weppelmann / Hendryk Schamberger	West Germany	29.0	15	15	14
15	Susanna Rahkamo / Petri Kokko	Finland	30.2	16	14	15
16	Desiree Schlegel / Patrik Brecht	Switzerland	32.6	17	16	16
17	Annalisa Meyers / Justin Green	United Kingdom	34.6	18	17	17
WD	Antonia Becherer / Ferdinand Becherer	West Germany		8		

Panel of judges
Referee : Mr. Wolfgang Kunz
Assistant Referee : Mr. Alexander Gorshkov
Judge N°1 : Mr. István Sugár (Hungary)
Judge N°2 : Ms. Marie-Danielle Wilhem (Switzerland)
Judge N°3 : Mr. Lino Clerici (Italy)
Judge N°4 : Ms. Maria Miller (Poland)
Judge N°5 : Ms. Felicitas Babusiková (Czech Republic)
Judge N°6 : Ms. Armelle Van Eybergen (France)
Judge N°7 : Ms. Irina Absaliamova (Soviet Union)
Judge N°8 : Ms. Heidi Maritczak (Austria)
Judge N°9 : Ms. Ingrid Reetz (West Germany)
Substitute : Ms. Joan Noble (United Kingdom)
