= 1988 World Figure Skating Championships =

Annual figure skating competition held in 1988

- Type: ISU Championship
- Date: March 22 – 27
- Season: 1987–88
- Location: Budapest, Hungary
- Venue: Budapest Sportcsarnok

Champions
- Men's singles: (United States) Brian Boitano
- Ladies' singles: (East Germany) Katarina Witt
- Pairs: (Soviet Union) Elena Valova / Oleg Vassiliev
- Ice dance: (Soviet Union) Natalia Bestemianova / Andrei Bukin
- Previous: 1987 World Championships
- Next: 1989 World Championships

The 1988 World Figure Skating Championships were held in Budapest, Hungary from March 22 to 27. Medals were awarded in men's singles, ladies' singles, pair skating, and ice dancing.

== Medal tables ==
=== Medalists ===
Discipline	Gold	Silver	Bronze
Men	(United States) Brian Boitano	(Canada) Brian Orser	(Soviet Union) Viktor Petrenko
Ladies	(East Germany) Katarina Witt	(Canada) Elizabeth Manley	(United States) Debi Thomas
Pairs	(Soviet Union) Elena Valova / Oleg Vassiliev	(Soviet Union) Ekaterina Gordeeva / Sergei Grinkov	(Soviet Union) Larissa Selezneva / Oleg Makarov
Ice dancing	(Soviet Union) Natalia Bestemianova / Andrei Bukin	(Soviet Union) Marina Klimova / Sergei Ponomarenko	(Canada) Tracy Wilson / Robert McCall

=== Medals by country ===
Rank	Nation	Gold	Silver	Bronze	Total
1	Soviet Union (URS)	2	2	2	6
2	United States (USA)	1	0	1	2
3	East Germany (GDR)	1	0	0	1
4	Canada (CAN)	0	2	1	3
Totals (4 entries)		4	4	4	12

== Results ==
=== Men ===
Kurt Browning of Canada landed the first ratified quadruple jump (a toe loop) in his free skating. Jozef Sabovcik of Czechoslovakia had landed a quad toe loop at the 1986 European Championships which was recognized at the event but then ruled invalid three weeks later due to a touchdown with his free foot.

Rank	Name	Nation	TFP	CF	OP	FS	OP+FS
1	Brian Boitano	United States	4.2	3	1	2	2
2	Brian Orser	Canada	4.8	5	2	1	1
3	Viktor Petrenko	Soviet Union	9.8	6	3	5	4
4	Grzegorz Filipowski	Poland	9.8	2	4	7	6
5	Christopher Bowman	United States	11.8	7	9	4	5
6	Kurt Browning	Canada	13.0	12	7	3	3
7	Heiko Fischer	West Germany	13.8	4	6	9	9
8	Petr Barna	Czechoslovakia	16.6	11	5	8	8
9	Paul Wylie	United States	17.0	13	8	6	7
10	Vladimir Petrenko	Soviet Union	19.2	8	11	10	10
11	Cameron Medhurst	Australia	23.4	14	10	11	11
12	Oliver Höner	Switzerland	25.6	9	13	15	15
13	Neil Paterson	Canada	27.6	18	12	12	12
14	Lars Dresler	Denmark	29.2	17	15	13	13
15	Paul Robinson	United Kingdom	31.0	19	14	14	14
16	Ralph Burghart	Austria	36.0	10	25	20	21
17	Ronny Winkler	East Germany	36.6	23	17	16	16
18	Peter Johansson	Sweden	38.4	25	16	17	17
19	Daniel Weiss	West Germany	39.8	16	18	23	22
20	András Száraz	Hungary	40.0	22	22	18	18
21	Alessandro Riccitelli	Italy	41.2	21	19	21	20
22	Oula Jääskeläinen	Finland	43.6	27	21	19	19
23	Frédéric Lipka	France	44.4	20	26	22	23
WD	Makoto Kano	Japan		15	20		
Free skating not reached
25	Tomislav Cizmesija	Yugoslavia		24	28		
26	David Liu	Chinese Taipei		28	24		
27	Joaquin Guerrero	Mexico		30	23		
28	Alexandre Geers	Belgium		29	29		
WD	Alexander Fadeev	Soviet Union		1			

=== Ladies ===
Rank	Name	Nation	TFP	CF	OP	FS	OP+FS
1	Katarina Witt	East Germany	2.4	1	2	1	1
2	Elizabeth Manley	Canada	4.8	2	4	2	2
3	Debi Thomas	United States	6.2	3	1	4	4
4	Claudia Leistner	West Germany	11.0	5	5	6	5
5	Jill Trenary	United States	11.8	4	11	5	6
6	Midori Ito	Japan	12.6	14	3	3	3
7	Caryn Kadavy	United States	13.8	6	8	7	7
8	Simone Koch	East Germany	16.4	10	6	8	8
9	Natalia Lebedeva	Soviet Union	18.6	8	7	11	10
10	Joanne Conway	United Kingdom	20.2	7	10	12	12
11	Tamara Téglássy	Hungary	21.6	15	9	9	9
12	Marina Kielmann	West Germany	25.2	16	14	10	11
13	Yvonne Gómez	Spain	26.0	11	16	13	13
14	Natalia Gorbenko	Soviet Union	27.2	9	17	15	14
15	Beatrice Gelmini	Italy	29.2	12	15	16	15
16	Lotta Falkenbäck	Sweden	35.4	19	25	14	16
17	Charlene Wong	Canada	36.0	17	12	21	19
18	Yvonne Pokorny	Austria	38.4	22	13	20	18
19	Claude Péri	France	38.6	24	18	17	17
20	Stefanie Schmid	Switzerland	39.0	21	21	18	20
21	Junko Yaginuma	Japan	40.2	18	26	19	21
22	Željka Čižmešija	Yugoslavia	40.4	13	24	23	24
23	Mirela Gawłowska	Poland	43.2	20	23	22	22
24	Gina Fulton	United Kingdom	44.8	23	20	23	23
Free skating not reached
25	Tracy Brook	Australia		26	19		
26	Anisette Torp-Lind	Denmark		28	22		
27	Jana Petruskova	Czechoslovakia		25	28		
28	Elina Hanninen	Finland		27	30		
29	Chi Hyun-jung	South Korea		30	27		
30	Diana Marcos	Mexico		29	31		
31	Asia Aleksieva	Bulgaria		31	29		

=== Pairs ===
Rank	Name	Nation	TFP	SP	FS
1	Elena Valova / Oleg Vasiliev	Soviet Union	1.8	2	1
2	Ekaterina Gordeeva / Sergei Grinkov	Soviet Union	2.4	1	2
3	Larisa Selezneva / Oleg Makarov	Soviet Union	4.2	3	3
4	Gillian Wachsman / Todd Waggoner	United States	6.0	5	4
5	Denise Benning / Lyndon Johnston	Canada	7.4	6	5
6	Jill Watson / Peter Oppegard	United States	8.6	4	7
7	Isabelle Brasseur / Lloyd Eisler	Canada	8.8	7	6
8	Mandy Wötzel / Axel Rauschenbach	East Germany	11.2	8	8
9	Christine Hough / Doug Ladret	Canada	12.6	9	9
10	Natalie Seybold / Wayne Seybold	United States	14.0	10	10
11	Lenka Knapová / René Novotný	Czechoslovakia	15.4	11	11
12	Cheryl Peake / Andrew Naylor	United Kingdom	16.8	12	12
13	Anuschka Gläser / Stefan Pfrengle	West Germany	18.2	13	13
14	Lisa Cushley / Neil Cushley	United Kingdom	19.6	14	14
15	Danielle Carr / Stephen Carr	Australia	21.0	15	15
16	Akiko Nogami / Yoichi Yamazaki	Japan	22.4	16	16

=== Ice dancing ===
Rank	Name	Nation	TFP	CD	OSP	FD
1	Natalia Bestemianova / Andrei Bukin	Soviet Union	2.0	1	1	1
2	Marina Klimova / Sergei Ponomarenko	Soviet Union	4.0	2	2	2
3	Tracy Wilson / Robert McCall	Canada	6.0	3	3	3
4	Natalia Annenko / Genrikh Sretenski	Soviet Union	8.0	4	4	4
5	Kathrin Beck / Christoff Beck	Austria	11.0	5	5	6
6	Isabelle Duchesnay / Paul Duchesnay	France	11.6	7	6	5
7	Klára Engi / Attila Tóth	Hungary	13.8	6	8	7
8	Antonia Becherer / Ferdinand Becherer	West Germany	15.6	8	7	8
9	Susie Wynne / Joseph Druar	United States	18.0	9	9	9
10	Lia Trovati / Roberto Pelizzola	Italy	20.0	10	10	10
11	Karyn Garossino / Rod Garossino	Canada	22.0	11	11	11
12	Sharon Jones / Paul Askham	United Kingdom	24.0	12	12	12
13	April Sargent / Russ Witherby	United States	26.0	13	13	13
14	Viera Řeháková / Ivan Havránek	Czechoslovakia	28.0	14	14	14
15	Melanie Cole / Michael Farrington	Canada	30.0	15	15	15
16	Dominique Yvon / Frédéric Palluel	France	32.0	16	16	16
17	Honorata Górna / Andrzej Dostatni	Poland	34.0	17	17	17
18	Andrea Weppelmann / Hendryk Schamberger	West Germany	36.4	18	19	18
19	Tomoko Tanaka / Hiroyuki Suzuki	Japan	37.6	19	18	19
20	Susanna Rahkamo / Petri Kokko	Finland	40.0	20	20	20
21	Krisztina Kerekes / Csaba Szentpéteri	Hungary	42.0	21	21	21
22	Monica MacDonald / Rodney Clarke	Australia	44.0	22	22	22
23	Desiree Schlegel / Patrik Brecht	Switzerland	46.0	23	23	23
24	Birgit Pleninger / Michael Steiner	Austria	48.0	24	24	24
Free dance not reached
25	Yucca Liu / Jim Sun	Chinese Taipei		25	25	
