= 1986 World Figure Skating Championships =

Annual figure skating competition held in 1986

- Type: ISU Championship
- Date: 18 – 23 March
- Season: 1985–86
- Location: Geneva, Switzerland
- Venue: Patinoire des Vernets

Champions
- Men's singles: (United States) Brian Boitano
- Ladies' singles: (United States) Debi Thomas
- Pairs: (Soviet Union) Ekaterina Gordeeva / Sergei Grinkov
- Ice dance: (Soviet Union) Natalia Bestemianova / Andrei Bukin
- Previous: 1985 World Championships
- Next: 1987 World Championships

The 1986 World Figure Skating Championships were held in Geneva, Switzerland from 18 to 23 March. At the event, sanctioned by the International Skating Union, medals were awarded in men's singles, ladies' singles, pair skating, and ice dancing.

The ISU Representative was Josef Dědič (Czechoslovakia), and the ISU Technical Delegate was Elemér Terták (Hungary).

Soviet judge Natalia Danilenko was suspended for ignoring a new rule requiring mandatory deductions of 0.1 for falls; she gave Alexandr Fadeev a score of 5.9 after he fell twice, instead of a maximum of 5.8.

== Medal tables ==
=== Medalists ===
Discipline	Gold	Silver	Bronze
Men	(United States) Brian Boitano	(Canada) Brian Orser	(Soviet Union) Alexander Fadeev
Ladies	(United States) Debi Thomas	(East Germany) Katarina Witt	(United States) Tiffany Chin
Pair skating	(Soviet Union) Ekaterina Gordeeva / Sergei Grinkov	(Soviet Union) Elena Valova / Oleg Vasiliev	(Canada) Cynthia Coull / Mark Rowsom
Ice dancing	(Soviet Union) Natalia Bestemianova / Andrei Bukin	(Soviet Union) Marina Klimova / Sergei Ponomarenko	(Canada) Tracy Wilson / Robert McCall

=== Medals by country ===
Rank	Nation	Gold	Silver	Bronze	Total
1	Soviet Union (URS)	2	2	1	5
2	United States (USA)	2	0	1	3
3	Canada (CAN)	0	1	2	3
4	East Germany (GDR)	0	1	0	1
Totals (4 entries)		4	4	4	12

== Results ==
=== Men ===
Rank	Name	Nation	CP	SP	FS	SP+FS	Points	Total
1	Brian Boitano	United States	4	5	1	2		5.4
2	Brian Orser	Canada	5	1	2	1		5.4
3	Alexander Fadeev	Soviet Union	1	2	5	4		6.4
4	Vladimir Kotin	Soviet Union	9	3	3	3		9.6
5	Viktor Petrenko	Soviet Union	7	6	4	5		10.6
6	Jozef Sabovčík	Czechoslovakia	2	4	9	8		11.8
7	Heiko Fischer	West Germany	3	7	10	10		14.6
8	Daniel Doran	United States	10	9	6	6		15.6
9	Scott Williams	United States	11	8	7	7		16.8
10	Masaru Ogawa	Japan	16	11	8	9		22.0
11	Richard Zander	West Germany	6	12	14	12		22.4
12	Falko Kirsten	East Germany	14	13	11	11		24.6
13	Grzegorz Filipowski	Poland	12	10	15	13		26.2
14	Oliver Höner	Switzerland	13	16	13	15		27.2
15	Laurent Depouilly	France	8	17	18	18		29.6
16	Petr Barna	Czechoslovakia	19	18	12	14		30.6
17	Lars Åkesson	Sweden	15	14	20	20		34.6
18	Neil Paterson	Canada	17	15	19	19		35.2
19	Lars Dresler	Denmark	21	19	17	17		37.2
20	Jaimee Eggleton	Canada	24	20	16	16		38.4
Free skating not reached
21	Alessandro Riccitelli	Italy	20	21	5	5		25.4
22	Cameron Medhurst	Australia	18	22	6	6		25.6
23	Thomas Hlavik	Austria	23	23	4	4		27.0
24	Oula Jääskeläinen	Finland	25	26	7	7		32.4
25	Miljan Begović	Yugoslavia	22	28	8	9		32.4
26	András Száraz	Hungary	27	25	9	8		35.2
27	Boyko Aleksiev	Bulgaria	26	27	10	11		36.4
28	Fernando Soria	Spain	28	24	11	10		37.4

Referee:

- Sonia Bianchetti Italy

Assistant Referee:

- Walburga Grimm East Germany

Judges:

- Tatiana Danilenko Soviet Union
- Maria Zuchowicz Poland
- Claire Ferguson United States
- Jean Matthews Canada
- Björn Elwin Sweden
- Junko Hiramatsu Japan
- Radovan Lipovšćak Yugoslavia
- Christiane Mörth Austria
- Miranda Marchi Italy

Substitute judge:

- Josette Betsch France

=== Ladies ===
Rank	Name	Nation	CP	SP	FS	SP+FS	Points	Total
1	Debi Thomas	United States	2	1	2	1		3.6
2	Katarina Witt	East Germany	3	4	1	2		4.4
3	Tiffany Chin	United States	4	2	4	3		7.2
4	Kira Ivanova	Soviet Union	1	6	8	8		11.0
5	Elizabeth Manley	Canada	11	7	3	4		12.4
6	Claudia Leistner	West Germany	9	5	6	5		13.4
7	Anna Kondrashova	Soviet Union	6	2	9	7		13.4
8	Caryn Kadavy	United States	7	9	7	9		14.8
9	Tracey Wainman	Canada	5	11	11	11		18.4
10	Natalia Lebedeva	Soviet Union	8	10	10	10		18.8
11	Midori Ito	Japan	19	8	5	6		19.6
12	Simone Koch	East Germany	16	13	12	12		26.8
13	Agnès Gosselin	France	13	18	13	13		28.0
14	Katrien Pauwels	Belgium	10	15	18	18		30.0
15	Susanne Becher	West Germany	12	20	15	17		30.2
16	Claudia Villiger	Switzerland	14	12	17	15		30.2
17	Constanze Gensel	East Germany	23	19	14	14		35.4
18	Tamara Téglássy	Hungary	22	17	16	16		36.0
19	Elise Ahonen	Finland	17	21	19	19		37.6
WD	Susan Jackson	United Kingdom	18	16				
Free skating not reached
21	Beatrice Gelmini	Italy	21	14	5	3		23.2
22	Željka Čižmešija	Yugoslavia	15	22	6	6		23.8
23	Lotta Falkenbäck	Sweden	20	23	3	4		24.2
24	Pauline Lee	Chinese Taipei	24	24	8	8		32.0
25	Lim Hye-kyung	South Korea	26	25	7	7		32.6
26	Sandra Escoda	Spain	25	27	9	9		34.8
27	Petya Gavazova	Bulgaria	27	26	10	10		36.6

Referee:

- Benjamin T. Wright United States

Assistant Referee:

- Erika Schiechtl West Germany

Judges:

- Elfriede Beyer West Germany
- Jacqueline Itschner Switzerland
- Charles U. Foster United States
- Tjaša Andrée Yugoslavia
- Reinhard Mirmseker East Germany
- Alexander Vedenin Soviet Union
- Alexander Penchev Bulgaria
- Leena Vainio Finland
- Franco Benini Italy

Substitute judge:

- Monique Georgelin France

=== Pairs ===
Rank	Name	Nation	SP	FS	Total
1	Ekaterina Gordeeva / Sergei Grinkov	Soviet Union	1	1	1.4
2	Elena Valova / Oleg Vasiliev	Soviet Union	2	2	2.8
3	Cynthia Coull / Mark Rowsom	Canada	4	3	4.6
4	Larisa Selezneva / Oleg Makarov	Soviet Union	3	4	5.2
5	Denise Benning / Lyndon Johnston	Canada	6	6	8.4
6	Jill Watson / Peter Oppegard	United States	9	5	8.6
7	Gillian Wachsman / Todd Waggoner	United States	5	7	9.0
8	Natalie Seybold / Wayne Seybold	United States	8	8	11.2
9	Katrin Kanitz / Tobias Schröter	East Germany	7	9	11.8
10	Lenka Knapová / René Novotný	Czechoslovakia	10	10	14.0
11	Manuela Landgraf / Ingo Steuer	East Germany	11	11	15.4
12	Cheryl Peake / Andrew Naylor	United Kingdom	12	12	16.8
13	Kerstin Kimminus / Stefan Pfrengle	West Germany	14	13	18.6
14	Danielle Carr / Stephen Carr	Australia	13	14	19.2
15	Sylvie Vaquero / Didier Manaud	France	15	15	21.0

Referee:

- Donald H. Gilchrist Canada

Assistant Referee:

- Markus Germann Switzerland

Judges:

- Shirley Taylor Australia
- Monique Georgelin France
- Eva von Gamm West Germany
- Gerhardt Bubnik Czechoslovakia
- Mikhail Drei Soviet Union
- E. Newbold Black IV United States
- Ralph S. McCreath Canada
- Geoffrey Yates United Kingdom
- Günter Teichmann East Germany

Substitute judge:

- Franco Benini Italy

=== Ice dancing ===
*: Semi-final

Rank	Name	Nation	CD	OSP	FD	Total
1	Natalia Bestemianova / Andrei Bukin	Soviet Union	1	2	1	2.4
2	Marina Klimova / Sergei Ponomarenko	Soviet Union	2	1	2	3.6
3	Tracy Wilson / Robert McCall	Canada	4	4	3	7.0
4	Natalia Annenko / Genrikh Sretenski	Soviet Union	3	3	4	7.0
5	Suzanne Semanick / Scott Gregory	United States	5	5	5	10.0
6	Renée Roca / Donald Adair	United States	6	6	6	12.0
7	Kathrin Beck / Christoff Beck	Austria	7	7	7	14.0
8	Antonia Becherer / Ferdinand Becherer	West Germany	8	8	8	16.0
9	Karyn Garossino / Rodn Garossino	Canada	9	9	9	18.0
10	Isabella Micheli / Roberto Pelizzola	Italy	10	10	10	20.0
11	Klára Engi / Attila Tóth	Hungary	11	11	11	22.0
12	Isabelle Duchesnay / Paul Duchesnay	France	12	12	12	24.0
13	Sharon Jones / Paul Askham	United Kingdom	13	14	13	26.4
14	Tomoko Tanaka / Hiroyuki Suzuki	Japan	14	13	14	27.6
15	Stefania Calegari / Pasquale Camerlengo	Italy	15	16	15	30.4
16	Elizabeth Coates / Alan Abretti	United Kingdom	16	15	16	31.6
17	Andrea Weppelmann / Hendryk Schamberger	West Germany	17	17	17	34.0
18	Claudia Schmidlin / Daniel Schmidlin	Switzerland	18	18	18	36.0
19	Monica MacDonald / Rodney Clarke	Australia	19	19	19	38.0
20	Hristina Boyanova / Yavor Ivanov	Bulgaria	20	20	20	40.0
21*	Susanna Pettola / Kim Jacobson	Finland	21	21	4	25.0
22*	Park Kyung-sook / Han Seung-jong	South Korea	22	22	5	27.0

Referee:

- Hans Kutschera Austria

Assistant Referee:

- Roland Wehinger Austria

Judges:

- Mary Parry United Kingdom
- Judit Fürst Hungary
- Kazuo Ohashi Japan
- Mary Louise Wright United States
- Lily Klapp Switzerland
- Irina Absaliamova Soviet Union
- William McLachlan Canada
- Lysiane Lauret France
- Gerhard Frey West Germany

Substitute judge:

- Heide Maritczak Austria
