= 1989 European Figure Skating Championships =

Figure skating competition

1989 European Championships
- Type: ISU Championship
- Date: January 17 – 22
- Season: 1988–89
- Location: Birmingham, England, United Kingdom
- Venue: National Exhibition Centre

Champions
- Men's singles: (Soviet Union) Alexander Fadeev
- Ladies' singles: (West Germany) Claudia Leistner
- Pairs: (Soviet Union) Larisa Selezneva / Oleg Makarov
- Ice dance: (Soviet Union) Marina Klimova / Sergei Ponomarenko
- Previous: 1988 European Championships
- Next: 1990 European Championships

The 1989 European Figure Skating Championships was a senior-level international competition held in Birmingham, England, United Kingdom on January 17–22, 1989. Elite skaters from European ISU member nations competed in the disciplines of men's singles, ladies' singles, pair skating, and ice dancing.

== Results ==
=== Men ===
West Germany's Richard Zander won the compulsory figures but withdrew after the short program.

Rank	Name	Nation	TFP	CF	OP	FS
1	Alexander Fadeev	Soviet Union	2.4	2	1	1
2	Grzegorz Filipowski	Poland	4.4	3	2	2
3	Petr Barna	Czechoslovakia	6.4	4	3	3
4	Dmitri Gromov	Soviet Union	10.8	11	4	4
5	Daniel Weiss	West Germany	12.0	5	5	7
6	Viacheslav Zagorodniuk	Soviet Union	13.0	8	8	5
7	Axel Médéric	France	19.4	7	6	13
8	Peter Johansson	Sweden	19.6	16	12	6
9	Lars Dresler	Denmark	21.0	12	7	12
10	Alessandro Riccitelli	Italy	21.4	9	13	10
11	András Száraz	Hungary	21.6	13	9	11
12	Ronny Winkler	East Germany	21.8	18	11	8
13	Éric Millot	France	23.4	15	14	9
14	Ralf Burghart	Austria	26.0	6	16	14
15	Christian Newberry	United Kingdom	28.0	10	15	15
16	Oula Jääskeläinen	Finland	34.4	19	18	16
17	Tomislav Čižmešija	Yugoslavia	35.0	14	19	18
18	Jan Erik Digernes	Norway	35.6	21	17	17
19	John Martin	United Kingdom	38.4	17	21	19
WD	Richard Zander	West Germany		1	10	
Final Not Reached
20	Boyko Aleksiev	Bulgaria		20	20	

=== Ladies ===
Leistner, Conway, Gorbenko were the top three after the compulsory figures. Leistner would go on to win the title while Lebedeva and Neske moved up to take silver and bronze, respectively.

Rank	Name	Nation	TFP	CF	OP	FS
1	Claudia Leistner	West Germany	2.0	1	1	1
2	Natalia Lebedeva	Soviet Union	5.4	4	3	2
3	Patricia Neske	West Germany	9.2	8	5	3
4	Simone Lang	East Germany	9.6	6	2	6
5	Natalia Gorbenko	Soviet Union	12.4	3	7	7
6	Joanne Conway	United Kingdom	13.2	2	4	10
7	Evelyn Großmann	East Germany	13.4	12	6	5
8	Surya Bonaly	France	15.6	17	8	4
9	Tamara Téglássy	Hungary	18.6	10	11	8
10	Yvonne Gómez	Spain	20.2	13	10	9
11	Željka Čižmešija	Yugoslavia	21.2	5	12	12
12	Yvonne Pokorny	Austria	21.6	7	13	11
13	Sabine Contini	Italy	26.0	14	9	15
14	Helene Persson	Sweden	29.4	11	15	16
15	Anisette Torp-Lind	Denmark	29.8	21	14	13
16	Stefanie Schmid	Switzerland	30.2	15	17	14
17	Claude Péri	France	30.2	9	16	17
18	Jacqueline Soames	United Kingdom	36.6	18	19	18
19	Jeltje Schulten	Netherlands	38.6	19	20	19
WD	Mirela Gawłowska	Poland		16	20	
Final Not Reached
20	Iveta Voralova	Czechoslovakia		20	21	
21	Sandrine Goes	Belgium		25	18	
22	Elina Hänninen	Finland		22	22	
23	Anita Thorenfeldt	Norway		24	24	
24	Asia Aleksieva	Bulgaria		23	25	
25	Andrea Gránitz	Hungary		26	26	

=== Pairs ===
Rank	Name	Nation	TFP	OP	FP
1	Larisa Selezneva / Oleg Makarov	Soviet Union	1.5	1	1
2	Mandy Wötzel / Axel Rauschenbach	East Germany	3.0	2	2
3	Natalia Mishkutenok / Artur Dmitriev	Soviet Union	4.5	3	3
4	Elena Kvitchenko / Rashid Kadyrkaev	Soviet Union	6.0	4	4
5	Cheryl Peake / Andrew Naylor	United Kingdom	7.5	5	5
6	Anuschka Gläser / Stefan Pfrengle	West Germany	9.0	6	6
7	Lisa Cushley / Neil Cushley	United Kingdom	10.5	7	7
8	Sonja Adalbert / Daniele Caprano	West Germany	12.0	8	8
9	Anna Górecka / Arkadiusz Górecki	Poland	13.5	9	9

=== Ice dancing ===
Klimova / Ponomarenko, Usova / Zhulin, and Annenko / Sretenski were the top three after the original set pattern.

Rank	Name	Nation	TFP	CD	OSP	FD
1	Marina Klimova / Sergei Ponomarenko	Soviet Union	2.0	1	1	1
2	Maya Usova / Alexander Zhulin	Soviet Union	4.0	2	2	2
3	Natalia Annenko / Genrikh Sretenski	Soviet Union	6.0	3	3	3
4	Klára Engi / Attila Tóth	Hungary	8.0	4	4	4
5	Stefania Calegari / Pasquale Camerlengo	Italy	11.0	6	6	5
6	Sharon Jones / Paul Askham	United Kingdom	11.0	5	5	6
7	Andrea Juklova / Martin Šimeček	Czechoslovakia	14.4	8	7	7
8	Dominique Yvon / Frédéric Palluel	France	15.6	7	7	8
9	Małgorzata Grajcar / Andrzej Dostatni	Poland	18.0	9	9	9
10	Andrea Weppelmann / Hendryk Schamberger	West Germany	20.4	11	10	10
11	Sophie Moniotte / Pascal Lavanchy	France	21.6	10	11	11
12	Susanna Rahkamo / Petri Kokko	Finland	24.0	12	12	12
13	Anna Croci / Luca Mantovani	Italy	26.0	13	13	13
14	Karen Quinn / Alan Abretti	United Kingdom	29.0	15	15	14
15	Krisztina Kerekes / Csaba Szentpéteri	Hungary	29.0	14	14	15
16	Diane Gerencser / Bernard Columberg	Switzerland	32.0	16	16	16
17	Ursula Holik / Herbert Holik	Austria	34.0	17	17	17
