= 1992 European Figure Skating Championships =

Figure skating competition

1992 European Championships
- Type: ISU Championship
- Date: January 21 – 26
- Season: 1991–92
- Location: Lausanne, Switzerland
- Venue: CIG de Malley

Champions
- Men's singles: (Czechoslovakia) Petr Barna
- Ladies' singles: (France) Surya Bonaly
- Pairs: (Commonwealth of Independent States) Natalia Mishkutenok / Artur Dmitriev
- Ice dance: (Commonwealth of Independent States) Marina Klimova / Sergei Ponomarenko
- Previous: 1991 European Championships
- Next: 1993 European Championships

The 1992 European Figure Skating Championships were held in Lausanne, Switzerland from January 21–26, 1992. Senior-level figure skaters from European ISU member nations competed in the disciplines of men's singles, ladies' singles, pair skating, and ice dancing.

== Results ==
=== Men ===
Rank	Name	Nation	TFP	SP	FS
1	Petr Barna	Czechoslovakia	2.5	1	2
2	Viktor Petrenko	CIS	3.0	4	1
3	Alexei Urmanov	CIS	4.5	3	3
4	Viacheslav Zagorodniuk	CIS	5.0	2	4
5	Grzegorz Filipowski	Poland	8.0	6	5
6	Nicolas Pétorin	France	8.5	5	6
7	Steven Cousins	United Kingdom	12.0	8	8
8	Éric Millot	France	12.5	11	7
9	Konstantin Kostin	Latvia	15.0	12	9
10	Henrik Walentin	Denmark	16.0	10	11
11	Ralph Burghart	Austria	16.5	13	10
12	Ronny Winkler	Germany	16.5	9	12
13	Mirko Eichhorn	Germany	16.5	7	13
14	Oula Jääskeläinen	Finland			
15	Marius Cristian Negrea	Romania			
16	John Martin	United Kingdom			
17	Gilberto Viadana	Italy			
18	Jan Erik Digernes	Norway			
19	Patrick Meier	Switzerland			
20	Jaroslav Suchý	Czechoslovakia			
21	Emanuele Ancorini	Sweden			
22	Alcuin Schulten	Netherlands			
23	Jordi Lafarga	Spain			
24	Rastislav Vnučko	Czechoslovakia			
Did not advance to free skating
25	Balázs Grenczer	Hungary			
26	Ivan Dinev	Bulgaria			

=== Ladies ===
Rank	Name	Nation	TFP	SP	FS
1	Surya Bonaly	France	1.5	1	1
2	Marina Kielmann	Germany	4.5	5	2
3	Patricia Neske	Germany	5.0	4	3
4	Simone Lang	Germany	5.0	2	4
5	Lenka Kulovaná	Czechoslovakia	7.5	3	6
6	Laetitia Hubert	France	9.0	8	5
7	Marie-Pierre Leray	France	10.5	7	7
8	Yulia Vorobieva	CIS	14.5	13	8
9	Joanne Conway	United Kingdom	14.5	9	10
10	Zuzanna Szwed	Poland	15.0	12	9
11	Alice Sue Claeys	Belgium	16.0	10	11
12	Charlene von Saher	United Kingdom	19.5	15	12
13	Nathalie Krieg	Switzerland	19.5	11	14
14	Tatiana Rachkova	CIS	20.0	6	17
15	Irena Zemanová	Czechoslovakia	21.5	17	13
16	Krisztina Czakó	Hungary	22.0	14	15
17	Anisette Torp-Lind	Denmark	25.0	18	16
18	Helene Persson	Sweden	27.5	19	18
19	Viktoria Dimitrova	Bulgaria	29.5	21	19
20	Alma Lepina	Latvia	30.0	16	22
21	Mila Kajas	Finland	31.0	22	20
22	Marion Krijgsman	Netherlands	32.5	23	21
23	Mojca Kopac	Slovenia	34.0	20	24
24	Olga Vassiljeva	Estonia	35.0	24	23

=== Pairs ===
Rank	Name	Nation	TFP	SP	FS
1	Natalia Mishkutenok / Artur Dmitriev	CIS	2.0	2	1
2	Elena Bechke / Denis Petrov	CIS	2.5	1	2
3	Evgenia Shishkova / Vadim Naumov	CIS	5.0	4	3
4	Radka Kovaříková / René Novotný	Czechoslovakia	5.5	3	4
5	Peggy Schwarz / Alexander König	Germany	8.0	6	5
6	Mandy Wötzel / Axel Rauschenbach	Germany	8.5	5	6
7	Anuschka Gläser / Stefan Pfengle	Germany	10.5	7	7
8	Leslie Monod / Cédric Monod	Switzerland	12.5	9	8
9	Cheryl Peake / Andrew Naylor	United Kingdom	13.0	8	9
10	Beata Zielińska / Mariusz Siudek	Poland	15.0	10	10
11	Anna Tabacchi / Massimo Salvade	Italy	16.5	11	11
12	Line Haddad / Sylvain Privé	France	18.0	12	12
13	Kathryn Pritchard / Jason Briggs	United Kingdom	19.5	13	13

=== Ice dancing ===
Rank	Name	Nation	TFP	CD1	CD2	OD	FD
1	Marina Klimova / Sergei Ponomarenko	CIS	2.0	1	1	1	1
2	Maya Usova / Alexander Zhulin	CIS	4.0	2	2	2	2
3	Oksana Grishuk / Evgeni Platov	CIS	6.0	3	3	3	3
4	Stefania Calegari / Pasquale Camerlengo	Italy	8.2	5	4	4	4
5	Klara Engi / Attila Toth	Hungary	9.8	4	5	5	5
6	Susanna Rahkamo / Petri Kokko	Finland	12.0	6	6	6	6
7	Dominique Yvon / Frédéric Palluel	France	14.0	7	7	7	7
8	Sophie Moniotte / Pascal Lavanchy	France	16.0	8	8	8	8
9	Kateřina Mrázová / Martin Šimeček	Czechoslovakia	18.0	9	9	9	9
10	Jennifer Goolsbee / Hendryk Schamberger	Germany	20.4	12	10	10	10
11	Anna Croci / Luca Mantovani	Italy	22.0	11	11	11	11
12	Marina Morel / Gwendal Peizerat	France	23.6	10	12	12	12
13	Regina Woodward / Csaba Szentpétery	Hungary	26.0	13	13	13	13
14	Radmila Chroboková / Milan Brzy	Czechoslovakia	28.6	16	15	14	14
15	Margarita Drobiazko / Povilas Vanagas	Lithuania	30.2	14	14	16	15
16	Valérie Le Tensorer / Jörg Kienzle	Switzerland	31.8	17	17	15	16
17	Melanie Bruce / Andrew Place	United Kingdom	33.2	15	15	17	17
18	Albena Denkova / Hristo Nikolov	Bulgaria	36.0	18	18	18	18
19	Agnieszka Domańska / Marcin Głowacki	Poland	38.6	21	20	19	19
20	Daria-Larissa Maritczak / Ihor-Andrij Maritczak	Austria	39.6	19	19	20	20
21	Katri Uski / Juha Sasi	Finland	41.8	20	21	21	21
