= St. Ivel International =

International figure skating competition

- Status: Defunct
- Genre: International competition
- Frequency: Annual
- Venue: Richmond Ice Rink
- Location: Greater London, England
- Country: (United Kingdom) Great Britain
- Years active: 1978–90
- Organiser: National Ice Skating Association

The St. Ivel International was an annual figure skating competition, sponsored by the National Ice Skating Association and held at the Richmond Ice Rink in the Twickenham district of Greater London, in the United Kingdom. The first competition – Great Britain's first international skating competition in several years – was held in 1978. The Rotary Watches International was sponsored by the Rotary Watch Company at a cost of over £25,000. Alan Pascoe, spokesperson for the Rotary Watches Company, stated that "it [had] been very exciting and [had] provided skaters from throughout the world with competition".

The Rotary Watch Company continued its sponsorship in 1979, but in 1980, sponsorship of the competition was taken over by the St Ivel dairy company, and the name was changed to the St. Ivel International. In 1988, the event was renamed the Skate Electric UK International in recognition of the sponsorship of British ice skating by the Electricity Supply Industry. That sponsorship continued through 1990. The competition originally scheduled for October 1991 – the United Kingdom International – was cancelled due to loss of sponsorship, and was never resumed.

Medals were awarded in men's singles, women's singles, pair skating, and ice dance, although each discipline may not have necessarily been held every year. Brian Orser of Canada holds the record for winning the most titles in men's singles (with three), while Christine Hough and Doug Ladret of Canada hold the record in pair skating (with two). Two teams are tied for winning the most titles in ice dance (with two each): Jayne Torvill and Christopher Dean of Great Britain, and Maya Usova and Alexander Zhulin of the Soviet Union. No one skater holds the record in women's singles, as there were unique champions each time the event was held.

== Medalists ==
=== Men's singles ===
Men's event medalists
| Year | Gold | Silver | Bronze | Ref. |
|---|---|---|---|---|
| 1978 | (Japan) Fumio Igarashi | (United States) David Santee | (Czechoslovakia) Miroslav Šoška | |
| 1979 | (United Kingdom) Robin Cousins | (Soviet Union) Igor Bobrin | (Canada) Brian Pockar | |
| 1980 | (Canada) Brian Pockar | (United States) Scott Hamilton | (Japan) Fumio Igarashi | |
| 1981 | (Canada) Brian Orser | (United States) David Santee | (West Germany) Rudi Cerne | |
| 1982 | (Canada) Brian Orser | (West Germany) Norbert Schramm | (United States) Tom Dickson | |
| 1983 | (West Germany) Heiko Fischer | (Canada) Gary Beacom | (East Germany) Falko Kirsten | |
| 1984 | (United States) Brian Boitano | (Soviet Union) Viktor Petrenko | (Poland) Grzegorz Filipowski | |
| 1985 | (Canada) Brian Orser | (Poland) Grzegorz Filipowski | (United States) Christopher Bowman | |
| 1986 | (United States) Daniel Doran | (Switzerland) Oliver Höner | (West Germany) Richard Zander | |
| 1987 | (United States) Paul Wylie | (Canada) Kurt Browning | (West Germany) Heiko Fischer | |
| 1988 | (Canada) Kurt Browning | (United States) Christopher Bowman | (East Germany) Ronny Winkler | |
| 1989 | (United States) Todd Eldredge | (Poland) Grzegorz Filipowski | (Soviet Union) Vladimir Petrenko | |
| 1990 | (Canada) Norm Proft | (East Germany) Ronny Winkler | (United States) Erik Larson | |
| 1991 | Competition cancelled due to lack of sponsorship | | | |

=== Women's singles ===
Women's event medalists
| Year | Gold | Silver | Bronze | Ref. |
|---|---|---|---|---|
| 1978 | (United States) Linda Fratianne | (Japan) Emi Watanabe | (West Germany) Dagmar Lurz | |
| 1979 | (Japan) Emi Watanabe | (West Germany) Dagmar Lurz | (United Kingdom) Karena Richardson | |
| 1980 | (United States) Sandy Lenz | (Canada) Tracey Wainman | (Socialist Federal Republic of Yugoslavia) Sanda Dubravčić | |
| 1981 | (Canada) Tracey Wainman | (United States) Jackie Farrell | (United Kingdom) Karen Wood | |
| 1982 | (United States) Elaine Zayak | (Canada) Tracey Wainman | (East Germany) Cornelia Tesch | |
| 1983 | (United States) Tiffany Chin | (West Germany) Manuela Ruben | (United Kingdom) Karen Wood | |
| 1984 | (United States) Kathryn Adams | (Canada) Cynthia Coull | (Switzerland) Claudia Villiger | |
| 1985 | (United States) Debi Thomas | (United Kingdom) Susan Jackson | (United Kingdom) Joanne Conway | |
| 1986 | (Canada) Elizabeth Manley | (United States) Jill Trenary | (East Germany) Inga Gauter | |
| 1987 | (United States) Caryn Kadavy | (West Germany) Patricia Neske | (United Kingdom) Joanne Conway | |
| 1988 | (Canada) Charlene Wong | (United Kingdom) Joanne Conway | (Italy) Beatrice Gelmini | |
| 1989 | (United States) Tonia Kwiatkowski | (East Germany) Simone Koch | (West Germany) Patricia Neske | |
| 1990 | (United States) Holly Cook | (Canada) Lisa Sargeant | (France) Surya Bonaly | |
| 1991 | Competition cancelled due to lack of sponsorship | | | |

=== Pairs ===
Pairs' event medalists
| Year | Gold | Silver | Bronze | Ref. |
|---|---|---|---|---|
| 1978 | No pairs competition | | | |
| 1979 | (Soviet Union); Nelli Chervotkina; Viktor Teslia | (West Germany); Christina Riegel; Andreas Nischwitz | (United Kingdom); Susan Garland; Robert Daw | |
| 1980 | (Canada); Barbara Underhill; Paul Martini | (Soviet Union); Inna Volyanskaya; Valery Spiridonov | (United Kingdom); Susan Garland; Robert Daw | |
| 1981 | (Canada); Lorri Baier; Lloyd Eisler | (United States); Vicki Heasley; Peter Oppegard | (United Kingdom); Susan Garland; Ian Jenkins | |
| 1982 | (Soviet Union); Lyudmila Koblova; Andrei Kalitin | (Canada); Melinda Kunhegyi; Lyndon Johnston | (United Kingdom); Susan Garland; Ian Jenkins | |
| 1983 | (East Germany); Birgit Lorenz; Knut Schubert | (Canada); Cynthia Coull; Mark Rowsom | (United States); Lea Ann Miller; William Fauver | |
| 1984 | (Soviet Union); Inna Bekker; Serguei Likhanski | (United States); Katy Keeley; Joseph Mero | (Canada); Laurene Collin; David Howe | |
| 1985 | (United States); Natalie Seybold; Wayne Seybold | (Canada); Christine Hough; Doug Ladret | (Soviet Union); Yulia Bystrova; Alexander Tarasov | |
| 1986 | (Canada); Christine Hough; Doug Ladret | (Canada); Michelle Menzies; Kevin Wheeler | (United States); Gillian Wachsman; Todd Waggoner | |
| 1987 | (Canada); Denise Benning; Lyndon Johnston | (East Germany); Peggy Schwarz; Alexander Koenig | (United States); Gillian Wachsman; Todd Waggoner | |
| 1988 | (East Germany); Peggy Schwarz; Alexander Koenig | (Soviet Union); Elena Bechke; Denis Petrov | (United Kingdom); Cheryl Peake; Andrew Naylor | |
| 1989 | (Canada); Isabelle Brasseur; Lloyd Eisler | (United States); Kellie Creel; Bob Pellaton | (Czechoslovakia); Radka Kovaříková; René Novotný | |
| 1990 | (Canada); Christine Hough; Doug Ladret | (Soviet Union); Elena Nikonova; Nikolai Apter | (Czechoslovakia); Radka Kovaříková; René Novotný | |
| 1991 | Competition cancelled due to lack of sponsorship | | | |

=== Ice dance ===
Ice dance event medalists
| Year | Gold | Silver | Bronze | Ref. |
|---|---|---|---|---|
| 1978 | (United Kingdom); Janet Thompson; Warren Maxwell | (Czechoslovakia); Liliana Řeháková; Stanislav Drastich | (Soviet Union); Natalia Karamysheva; Rostislav Sinicyn | |
| 1979 | (Hungary); Krisztina Regőczy; András Sallay | (United Kingdom); Jayne Torvill; Christopher Dean | (Soviet Union); Natalia Karamysheva; Rostislav Sinicyn | |
| 1980 | (United Kingdom); Jayne Torvill; Christopher Dean | (Soviet Union); Elena Garanina; Igor Zavozin | (United Kingdom); Karen Barber; Nicky Slater | |
| 1981 | (United Kingdom); Jayne Torvill; Christopher Dean | (United Kingdom); Karen Barber; Nicky Slater | (United Kingdom); Wendy Sessions; Stephen Williams | |
| 1982 | (United States); Judy Blumberg; Michael Seibert | (United Kingdom); Karen Barber; Nicky Slater | (Soviet Union); Elena Batanova; Alexei Soloviev | |
| 1983 | (United Kingdom); Karen Barber; Nicky Slater | (United States); Carol Fox; Richard Dalley | (United Kingdom); Wendy Sessions; Stephen Williams | |
| 1984 | (Canada); Tracy Wilson; Robert McCall | (Soviet Union); Natalia Annenko; Genrikh Sretenski | (United States); Susan Wynne; Joseph Druar | |
| 1985 | (Soviet Union); Natalia Annenko; Genrikh Sretenski | (United States); Suzanne Semanick; Scott Gregory | (Hungary); Klára Engi; Attila Tóth | |
| 1986 | (Austria); Kathrin Beck; Christoff Beck | (United Kingdom); Sharon Jones; Paul Askham | (France); Isabelle Duchesnay; Paul Duchesnay | |
| 1987 | (Soviet Union); Maya Usova; Alexander Zhulin | (United Kingdom); Sharon Jones; Paul Askham | (Italy); Lia Trovati; Roberto Pelizzola | |
| 1988 | (Soviet Union); Maya Usova; Alexander Zhulin | (United Kingdom); Sharon Jones; Paul Askham | (United States); Suzanne Semanick; Ron Kravette | |
| 1989 | (Soviet Union); Anjelika Krylova; Vladimir Leliukh | (United States); Jeanne Miley; Michael Verlich | (France); Isabelle Sarech; Xavier Debernis | |
| 1990 | (Italy); Stefania Calegari; Pasquale Camerlengo | (France); Sophie Moniotte; Pascal Lavanchy | (United Kingdom); Lisa Bradby; Alan Towers | |
| 1991 | Competition cancelled due to lack of sponsorship | | | |

== Records ==
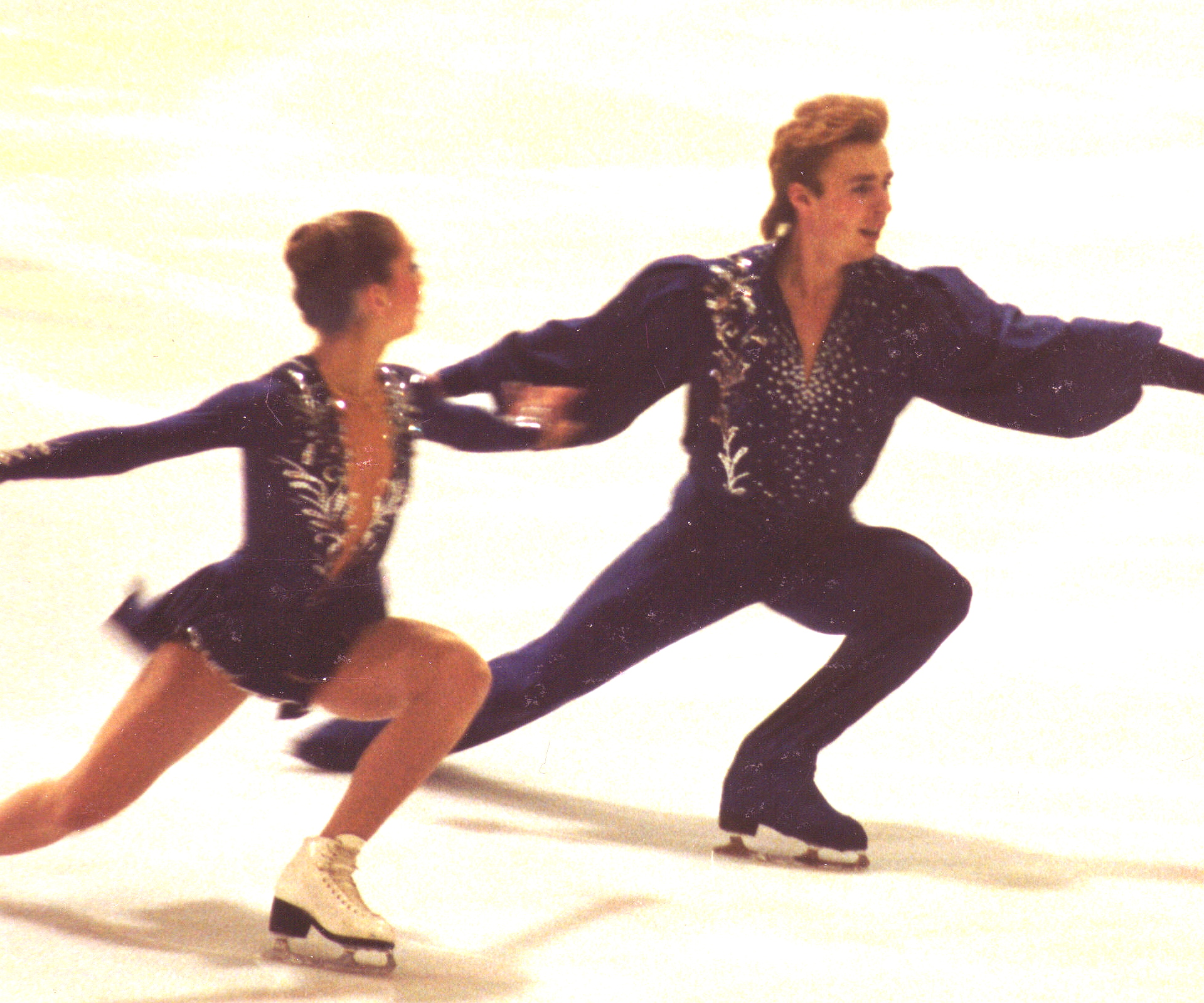
Maya Usova and Alexander Zhulin of the Soviet Union won two St. Ivel International titles in ice dance.

Records
| Discipline | Most titles | | | |
| Discipline | Skater(s) | No. | Years | Ref. |
|---|---|---|---|---|
| Men's singles | (Canada); Brian Orser | 3 | 1981–82; 1985 | |
| Women's singles | —N/a | | | |
| Pairs | (Canada); Christine Hough; Doug Ladret | 2 | 1986; 1990 | |
| Ice dance | (United Kingdom); Jayne Torvill; Christopher Dean | 2 | 1980–81 | |
| Ice dance | (Soviet Union); Maya Usova; Alexander Zhulin | 2 | 1987–88 | |

== Cumulative medal count ==
=== Men's singles ===
Total number of St. Ivel International medals in men's singles by nation
| Rank | Nation | Gold | Silver | Bronze | Total |
|---|---|---|---|---|---|
| 1 | Canada | 6 | 2 | 1 | 9 |
| 2 | United States | 4 | 4 | 3 | 11 |
| 3 | West Germany | 1 | 1 | 3 | 5 |
| 4 | Japan | 1 | 0 | 1 | 2 |
| 5 | Great Britain | 1 | 0 | 0 | 1 |
| 6 | Poland | 0 | 2 | 1 | 3 |
| 6 | Soviet Union | 0 | 2 | 1 | 3 |
| 8 | East Germany | 0 | 1 | 2 | 3 |
| 9 | Switzerland | 0 | 1 | 0 | 1 |
| 10 | Czechoslovakia | 0 | 0 | 1 | 1 |
| Totals (10 entries) | | 13 | 13 | 13 | 39 |

=== Women's singles ===
Total number of St. Ivel International medals in women's singles by nation
| Rank | Nation | Gold | Silver | Bronze | Total |
|---|---|---|---|---|---|
| 1 | United States | 9 | 2 | 0 | 11 |
| 2 | Canada | 3 | 4 | 0 | 7 |
| 3 | Japan | 1 | 1 | 0 | 2 |
| 4 | West Germany | 0 | 3 | 2 | 5 |
| 5 | Great Britain | 0 | 2 | 5 | 7 |
| 6 | East Germany | 0 | 1 | 2 | 3 |
| 7 | France | 0 | 0 | 1 | 1 |
| 7 | Italy | 0 | 0 | 1 | 1 |
| 7 | Switzerland | 0 | 0 | 1 | 1 |
| 7 | Yugoslavia | 0 | 0 | 1 | 1 |
| Totals (10 entries) | | 13 | 13 | 13 | 39 |

=== Pairs ===
Total number of St. Ivel International medals in pair skating by nation
| Rank | Nation | Gold | Silver | Bronze | Total |
|---|---|---|---|---|---|
| 1 | Canada | 6 | 4 | 1 | 11 |
| 2 | Soviet Union | 3 | 3 | 1 | 7 |
| 3 | East Germany | 2 | 1 | 0 | 3 |
| 4 | United States | 1 | 3 | 3 | 7 |
| 5 | West Germany | 0 | 1 | 0 | 1 |
| 6 | Great Britain | 0 | 0 | 5 | 5 |
| 7 | Czechoslovakia | 0 | 0 | 2 | 2 |
| Totals (7 entries) | | 12 | 12 | 12 | 36 |

=== Ice dance ===
Total number of St. Ivel International medals in ice dance by nation
| Rank | Nation | Gold | Silver | Bronze | Total |
|---|---|---|---|---|---|
| 1 | Great Britain | 4 | 6 | 4 | 14 |
| 2 | Soviet Union | 4 | 2 | 3 | 9 |
| 3 | United States | 1 | 3 | 2 | 6 |
| 4 | Austria | 1 | 0 | 1 | 2 |
| 4 | Hungary | 1 | 0 | 1 | 2 |
| 6 | Canada | 1 | 0 | 0 | 1 |
| 6 | Italy | 1 | 0 | 0 | 1 |
| 8 | France | 0 | 1 | 2 | 3 |
| 9 | Czechoslovakia | 0 | 1 | 0 | 1 |
| Totals (9 entries) | | 13 | 13 | 13 | 39 |

=== Total medals ===
Total number of St. Ivel International medals by nation
| Rank | Nation | Gold | Silver | Bronze | Total |
|---|---|---|---|---|---|
| 1 | Canada | 16 | 10 | 2 | 28 |
| 2 | United States | 15 | 12 | 8 | 35 |
| 3 | Soviet Union | 7 | 7 | 5 | 19 |
| 4 | Great Britain | 5 | 8 | 14 | 27 |
| 5 | East Germany | 2 | 3 | 4 | 9 |
| 6 | Japan | 2 | 1 | 1 | 4 |
| 7 | West Germany | 1 | 5 | 5 | 11 |
| 8 | Austria | 1 | 0 | 1 | 2 |
| 8 | Hungary | 1 | 0 | 1 | 2 |
| 8 | Italy | 1 | 0 | 1 | 2 |
| 11 | Poland | 0 | 2 | 1 | 3 |
| 12 | Czechoslovakia | 0 | 1 | 3 | 4 |
| 12 | France | 0 | 1 | 3 | 4 |
| 14 | Switzerland | 0 | 1 | 1 | 2 |
| 15 | Yugoslavia | 0 | 0 | 1 | 1 |
| Totals (15 entries) | | 51 | 51 | 51 | 153 |
