= Tracey Wainman =

Canadian figure skater

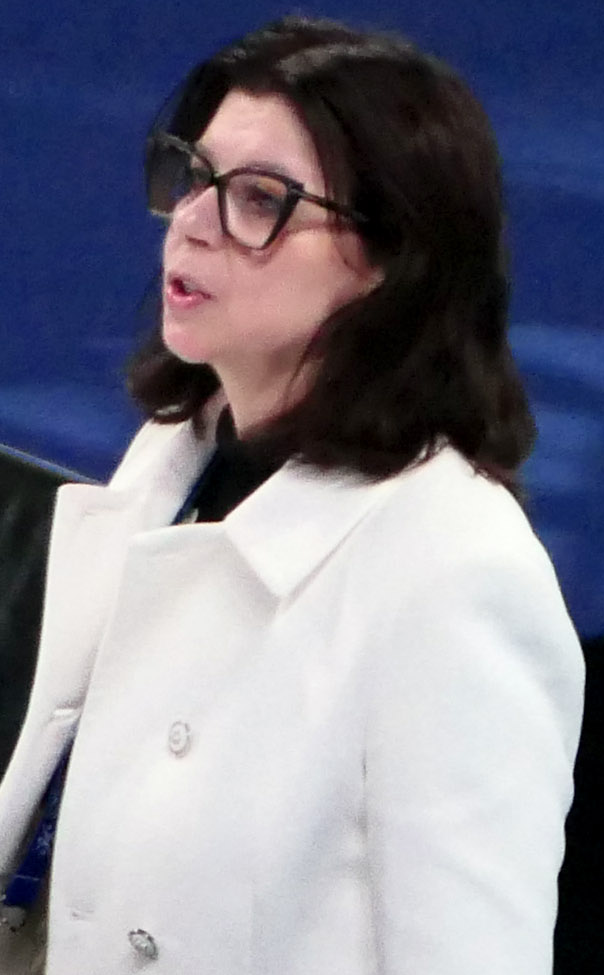
- Wainman in 2024

Personal information
- Born: May 27, 1967 (age 59)

Figure skating career
- Country: Canada
- Skating club: Toronto Cricket, Skating, and Curling Club
- Retired: 1986

Tracey Wainman (born May 27, 1967) is a Canadian former competitive figure skater. She is the 1981 Skate Canada International champion and a two-time Canadian national champion (1981 and 1986).

== Competitive career ==
Early in her career, Tracey Wainman was coached by Ellen Burka at the Toronto Cricket, Skating, and Curling Club. Her skating-related expenses were about $30,000 a year.

Wainman first came to international prominence in 1980. At the age of 12, she won her first senior national medal, taking bronze at the 1980 Canadian Championships behind Heather Kemkaran and Janet Morrissey. Kemkaran received Canada's sole ladies' berth to the 1980 Olympics but Wainman was controversially selected for the World Championships instead of Kemkaran or Morrissey. At that time, David Dore, the head of the Canadian Figure Skating Association (CFSA), and Canadian television were heavily promoting Wainman as a future champion.

At the 1980 World Championships in Dortmund, she finished 14th overall, having placed 21st in the compulsory figures, 17th in the short program and 10th in the free skate. Howard Bass of The Daily Telegraph wrote, "Tracey steals the show", and predicted she would win the 1984 Olympic title. In a 2006 interview, Wainman stated, "I was so excited to be there, skating with my idols, all these stars I'd seen on TV. I spent the whole week running around with an autograph book." The chatter at her skating club in Toronto, however, was sometimes harsh. Wainman recalled, "Kids said that I was taking drugs to stunt my growth, that I was secretly 27. The best one was that my parents had doctored my birth certificate and locked me in a room to prevent me from growing."

The following season, Wainman won the Canadian national title for the first time and was assigned to her second World Championships. In contrast to a year earlier, she had her best performance at 1981 Worlds in Hartford, Connecticut in the compulsory figures, placing 6th. Her short program was ranked 15th and her free skate 10th for an overall result of 10th. In the summer of 1981, Wainman moved to Orillia to work with Doug Leigh, the coach of Brian Orser.

Wainman began the next season by winning gold at the 1981 Skate Canada International. The Canadian Press named her the Female Athlete of the Year. However, she struggled at the 1982 Canadian Championships, falling three times in the long program and finishing third overall. She was not assigned to Worlds. The media's highlighting of her errors affected her mental focus—"Every time I made a mistake it was magnified. The media would report every fall. And then I started being afraid of making a mistake. So in training, I would try a jump and change my mind in mid-air," Wainman later stated. She was also undergoing a teenage growth spurt; she grew six inches in two years and put on weight as her figure developed.

At the start of the 1982–83 season, the CFSA stripped Wainman of an international assignment in the Netherlands, criticizing the 14-year-old's work ethic. After placing 7th at the 1983 Canadian Championships, she stopped skating entirely for a year.

When Wainman resumed skating in the spring of 1984, she returned to her old coach, Ellen Burka, at the Toronto Cricket Club. Burka taught her from scratch—the teenager had lost most of her skills and had a fear of jumping.

She began her comeback at the 1985 Canadian National Championships by leading the field after the first phase, compulsory figures—then worth 30% of the final score. After falling on a planned Triple Salchow+Double Toe Loop combination in her short program, she was left with required element scores as low as 4.0. In the long program, she again failed to complete her sole planned triple jump, the Salchow. Further errors on other significant elements left her off the podium.

Returning to the Canadian Championships in February 1986, Wainman unexpectedly won her second national title, the judges putting her ahead of reigning champion Elizabeth Manley. She was assigned to her third international championships, the 1986 Worlds. After placing 5th in compulsory figures and 11th in both the short and free programs, she came in 9th overall at the event in Geneva, Switzerland.

The CFSA passed her over for international assignments the following season—allegedly because they disapproved of her undisciplined off-ice behavior. Wainman decided to retire from competitive skating and then skated professionally with shows including Holiday on Ice and Ice Capades.

Often cited as a cautionary example of a young skater who burned out after being prematurely pushed into the spotlight, Wainman commented in 2006, "if they had held me back, I might never have got to compete at the Worlds. I'm just glad I got to go."

== Coaching career ==
Wainman currently works as a coach and skating director at the York Region Skating Academy in Richmond Hill, Ontario. She has coached skaters to a total of nine national medals, including four titles. She was awarded the COS Competitive Coach of the Year twice (2002 and 2006) and 2011 Skate Canada Competitive Coach of Excellence.

Wainman previously coached Alexandra Najarro Conrad Orzel, and Nam Nguyen. She is the current coach of Roman Sadovsky.

== Personal life ==
Wainman was born on May 27, 1967. She was very close with her little brother Corey Wainman and their relationship was very tight. Her parents divorced around 1980.

In 1987, she married Czechoslovak skater Jozef Sabovčík and gave birth to their son, Blade, in spring 1992; the couple split in late 1993. Her current off-ice partner is Grzegorz Filipowski, a Polish skater whom she met at the 1980 World Championships.

== Results ==
International
Event	77–78	79-80	80–81	81–82	82–83	84–85	85–86
World Champ.		14th	10th				9th
Skate America							2nd
Skate Canada			2nd	1st			
St. Ivel International			2nd	1st	2nd		
Prize of Moscow News							4th
Schäfer Memorial		3rd					
International: Junior
World Junior Champ.	6th						
National
Canadian Champ.		3rd	1st	3rd	7th	4th	1st
