= Tracy Brook =

Australian figure skater

Personal information
- Full name: Tracy-Lee Brook
- Born: 8 July 1971 (age 55)

Figure skating career
- Country: Australia
- Retired: c. 1989

Tracy-Lee Brook (born 8 July 1971) is an Australian former competitive figure skater. She is a three-time Australian national champion (1986–87 to 1988–89) and competed at the 1988 Winter Olympics.

== Career ==
Due to a stress fracture in her foot, Brook decided to undergo acupuncture treatment in November 1984. She won the Australian junior title in August 1985 and was selected to compete at the World Junior Championships in Sarajevo. She finished 23rd at the event.

In the 1986–87 season, Brook won her first senior national title and was sent to the 1987 World Championships in Cincinnati, finishing 18th. She placed seventh at the 1987 NHK Trophy. After repeating as the Australian national champion, Brook competed at the 1988 Winter Olympics in Calgary, placing 25th. She had the same result at the 1988 World Championships in Budapest, Hungary.

In her final competitive season, Brook won her third national title and ranked 21st at the 1989 World Championships in Paris.

== Competitive highlights ==
International
Event	85–86	86–87	87–88	88–89
Olympics			25th	
Worlds		18th	25th	21st
Prague Skate		10th		
NHK Trophy			7th	
International: Junior
Junior Worlds	23rd			
National
Australian Champ.		1st	1st	1st
