= Norm Proft =

Personal information
- Born: c. 1966 (age 59–60) North Vancouver, British Columbia, Canada

Figure skating career
- Country: Canada
- Coach: Cynthia Ullmark
- Retired: 1991

Norm Proft (born c. 1966) is a Canadian former competitive figure skater. He is the 1989 Grand Prix International de Paris bronze medalist and 1990 Skate Electric champion.

== Personal life ==
Proft was born around 1967 in North Vancouver, British Columbia, Canada. He married choreographer Julie Brault, and has a daughter, Emmanuelle (born c. 2002).

== Career ==
Proft switched from ice hockey to figure skating at age 11. Coached by Cynthia Ullmark, he was called up to compete in the junior event at the 1987 Canadian Championships after two skaters withdrew. He won gold at the event.

Internationally, he was awarded bronze medals at the 1988 Golden Spin of Zagreb and 1989 Grand Prix International de Paris, and gold at the 1990 Skate Electric.

Proft left amateur competition in 1991 and went on to skate in shows. He currently works for Skate Canada.

== Competitive highlights ==
International
Event	86–87	87–88	88–89	89–90	90–91
Fujifilm Trophy		6th			
Internat. de Paris				3rd	
Golden Spin			3rd		
Skate Canada				3rd A	4th
Skate Electric					1st
National
Canadian Champ.	1st J				7th
J = Junior level; A = Artistic event
