= Sergei Grinkov =

Russian pair skater (1967–1995)

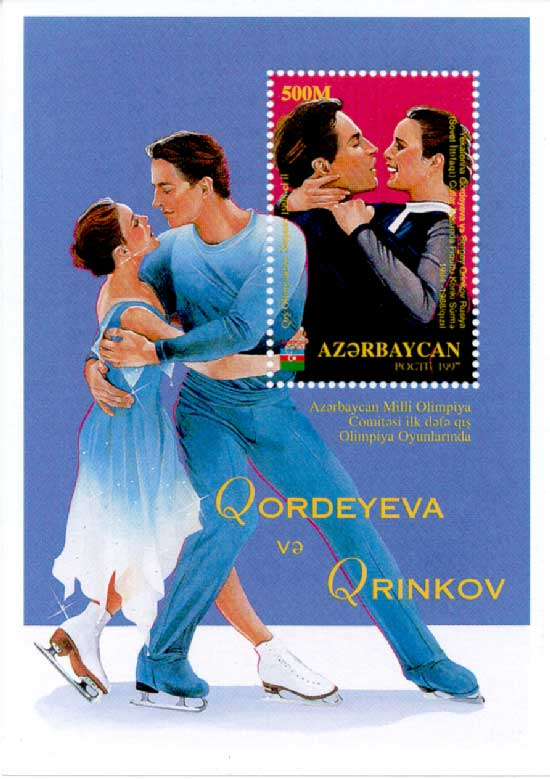
- A 1998 stamp commemorating Gordeeva and Grinkov

Personal information
- Native name: Сергей Михайлович Гриньков
- Full name: Sergei Mikhailovich Grinkov
- Born: 4 February 1967 Moscow, Russian SFSR, Soviet Union
- Died: 20 November 1995 (aged 28) Lake Placid, New York, U.S.
- Height: 6 ft 0 in (183 cm)

Figure skating career
- Country: Russia
- Skating club: CSKA Moscow; Philadelphia SC & HS
Medal record
Figure skating – Pairs
Representing Russia
Olympic Games
Gold medal – first place	1994 Lillehammer	Pairs
European Championships
Gold medal – first place	1994 Copenhagen	Pairs
Representing Soviet Union
Olympic Games
Gold medal – first place	1988 Calgary	Pairs
World Championships
Gold medal – first place	1986 Geneva	Pairs
Gold medal – first place	1987 Cincinnati	Pairs
Gold medal – first place	1989 Paris	Pairs
Gold medal – first place	1990 Halifax	Pairs
Silver medal – second place	1988 Budapest	Pairs
European Championships
Gold medal – first place	1988 Prague	Pairs
Gold medal – first place	1990 Leningrad	Pairs
Silver medal – second place	1986 Copenhagen	Pairs

Sergei Mikhailovich Grinkov (Russian: Сергей Михайлович Гриньков; 4 February 1967 – 20 November 1995) was a Soviet and Russian pair skater. Together with his wife Ekaterina Gordeeva, he was the 1988 and 1994 Olympic Champion and a four-time World Champion (1986, 1987, 1989, 1990).

== Personal life ==
Sergei Grinkov was born in Moscow to Anna Filipovna Grinkova and Mikhail Kondrateyevich Grinkov and had an older sister, Natalia Mikailovna Grinkova. He married Ekaterina Gordeeva in April 1991. They had two ceremonies because the USSR did not recognize religious ceremonies. The legal, official state-approved wedding was on 20 April, and a religious wedding in the Russian Orthodox Church took place on 28 April. On 11 September 1992, Gordeeva gave birth to their daughter, Daria "Dasha" Sergeyevna Grinkova, in Morristown, New Jersey. After the 1994 Olympics, they settled in Simsbury, Connecticut. Daria took up skating seriously at age 9, appearing with her mother in several skating shows from 2003 to 2007 but quit competitive skating to pursue other interests in 2007. However, Daria still skates with her mother in amateur ranks.

Grinkov's father died of heart disease in 1991. His mother died in 2000 in Moscow.

== Career ==
Grinkov first took to the ice at the age of five, entering the Children and Youth Sports School of CSKA in Moscow. As Grinkov was not a strong solo skater, his coach decided to try him in pair skating, and in August 1981, at age fourteen, he was paired with ten-year-old Ekaterina Gordeeva at the Central Red Army Club (CSKA) in Moscow by coach Vladimir Zaharov.

The pair won the 1985 World Junior Championship in Colorado Springs, Colorado. The following year they won the first of their four World Figure Skating Championships. They became repeat world champions the following year and won gold at the 1988 Winter Olympics in Calgary, Alberta. Grinkov became one of the youngest male figure skating Olympic champions.

After a fall in their long program, they took silver at the World Championships in 1988, but they reclaimed that title in 1989 and successfully defended it again in 1990. They turned professional in the fall of 1990. They won their first World Professional Championship in 1991, and went on to win that title two more times (1992 and 1994).

Gordeeva/Grinkov won virtually every competition they entered. In the 31 competitions they completed at the Senior and professional levels, they finished first 24 times and finished off the podium only once; from the time they won their first World Championships, they never placed lower than silver and took gold in all but four of the competitions they completed. They are one of the few pair teams in history to successfully complete a quadruple twist lift in international competition, at the 1987 World Championships. They also completed the difficult maneuver at the 1987 European Championships, but due to a problem with Grinkov's boot strap and a misunderstanding about the rules, they were disqualified from that event (the referee signaled them to stop, going so far as to turn off their music but they continued skating).

The following season was the first year they toured with Stars on Ice. They skated throughout the United States and Canada with the show, which ran from November 1991 through April 1992. Shortly after their daughter's birth, the pair was back on the ice training for the new season of Stars on Ice, which debuted that November and ran through April 1993.

In 1994, Gordeeva/Grinkov took advantage of a one-time rule change that allowed professional skaters to regain their Olympic eligibility. They won their second gold medal at the 1994 Winter Olympics in Lillehammer, Norway — the only reinstated skaters to win gold. They then returned to professional skating in the United States. During the 1994–95 season, they toured again with Stars on Ice, this time as headliners. They won the World Professional Championships for the third time in December 1994, earning ten perfect 10s (and nothing lower than a 9.9). Their last competition was at the 1995 Challenge of Champions, which took place on 7 January 1995 in Tokyo, Japan where they skated to Verdi's "Requiem Mass". They won, earning four perfect 10s in their artistic mark. In the fall of 1995, they were preparing new programs and getting ready to return to Stars on Ice for a fourth season. On 12 November 1995, they appeared in an exhibition called Skates of Gold III in Albany, New York. They skated two numbers: Verdi's "Requiem Mass" and the Rolling Stones' "Out of Tears". It would be their final public performance together.

The pair was known for their quiet glide over the ice: "Grinkov and Gordeeva had something special that was more easily appreciated in person. They didn't make noise when they skated. They moved so fluidly that their blades whispered over the ice rather than scratching at it." Their last public performance, just days before Grinkov's sudden death, was in the "Skates for Gold III" television special in Albany, N.Y.

== Death ==
On 20 November 1995, Grinkov collapsed and died from a massive heart attack in Lake Placid, New York, while he and Gordeeva were practicing for the upcoming 1995–1996 Stars on Ice tour. Doctors found that Grinkov had severely clogged coronary arteries (to the point where his arterial opening was reportedly the size of a pinhole), which caused the heart attack; later testing revealed that he also had a genetic risk factor linked with premature heart attacks. The risk factor is called the PLA-2 variant and is also known as the "Grinkov Risk Factor". Grinkov was 28 years old. His wife was 24 and their daughter was three years old.

Grinkov is interred in the Vagan'kovskoye Cemetery in Moscow. Gordeeva, his widow, along with an all-star cast, skated a tribute in his honor titled "Celebration of a Life" in February 1996, which was later televised. Gordeeva also authored a book about their life and partnership titled My Sergei: A Love Story, which was later turned into a television movie/docudrama titled "My Sergei" and released on DVD. He was also the subject of a book, geared towards the 9–12 age group, titled They Died Too Young: Sergei Grinkov written by Anne E. Hill.

Gordeeva and Grinkov have garnered significant mention in numerous books about the world of figure skating, and Grinkov was featured as one of the athletes in People magazine's book, Gone Too Soon. Fans around the world continue to commemorate Grinkov and G&G and their skating lives in videos available online and commercially. They are frequently mentioned during telecasts of pairs skating competitions and were number 4 on Sports Illustrated's 2009 "Thrill List: Figure Skating".

In the fall of 2007, Gordeeva was the headliner for "Skate for the Heart" a skating show televised nationally in the United States with the goal of raising awareness of heart disease, skating in honor of Grinkov. She starred in the show a second time in 2008, this time dedicating her performance to her late father who, like Sergei, died of a sudden heart attack in 2008.

== Quotes ==
Our honor depends on our honesty.

— Sovetskiy Sport (15 April 1987)

In Russian: Наша честь зависит от нашей честности.

— Советский спорт от 15 апреля 1987 года.

== Programs ==
With Ekaterina Gordeeva

Season	Short program	Long program	Exhibition
1994–1995			From Requiem: Dies Irae; Lacrymosa; Sanctus by Giuseppe Verdi; Vocalise, Op. 34, No. 14 by Sergei Rachmaninoff; The Man I Love by Ella Fitzgerald; Out of Tears by The Rolling Stones; Crazy for You by George Gershwin; Pocahontas
1993–1994	"Flamenco": Al Son del Rocan Trompetas by La Perla de Cádiz; Zapateado; Farrucas by Pepe Romero; Picasso Suite: The Dancer by Michel Legrand	Piano Sonata No. 8 "Pathétique"; Piano Sonata No. 14 "Moonlight" by Ludwig van Beethoven performed by Vladimir Horowitz	Reverie by Claude Debussy; Porgy and Bess by George Gershwin
1990–1993			Maria from West Side Story by Leonard Bernstein; Pas de Deux from The Nutcracker by Pyotr Tchaikovsky; A Whole New World from Aladdin; Pagliacci; Scheherazade by Nikolai Rimsky-Korsakov; Jesus Christ Superstar by Andrew Lloyd Webber
1989–1990	Mambo No.5/Mambo Jambo by Pérez Prado	Romeo and Juliet by Pyotr Tchaikovsky	Still Loving You by Scorpions; Meditation from Thaïs by Jules Massenet; Cha Cha Cha; Melancholy Man by Paul Mauriat
1988–1989	The Barber of Seville by Gioachino Rossini	Die Fledermaus by Johann Strauss II	Liebestraum
1987–1988	From Carmen: Les Toreadores; La garde montante by Georges Bizet	Symphony No. 4 by Felix Mendelssohn; Concerto No.2; Etude No.12 "Revolutionary"; Concerto No.1 by Frédéric Chopin; Overture from The Marriage of Figaro by Wolfgang Amadeus Mozart	Katyusha
1986–1987	Jazz medley	Caravans by Duke Ellington	
1985–1986	Temptation Rag by Claude Bolling	Caravans; Send In the Clowns	Fly, doves! by Isaak Dunayevsky
1984–1985	unknown	Through the Eyes of Love by Marvin Hamlisch	
1983–1984	Zorba the Greek by Mikis Theodorakis	unknown	

== Results ==
Paired with Ekaterina Gordeeva.

International
Event	1983–84	1984–85	1985–86	1986–87	1987–88	1988–89	1989–90	1990–91	1991–92	1992–93	1993–94
Olympics					1st						1st
Worlds			1st	1st	2nd	1st	1st				
Europeans			2nd	WD	1st		1st				1st
Goodwill Games							1st				
Skate Canada			1st	2nd							1st
NHK Trophy							1st				
Moscow News			4th		1st						
International: Junior
Junior Worlds	5th	1st									
National
Russian Champ.											1st
Soviet Champ.		6th	2nd	1st							
Other
World Pro.							2nd	1st	1st		1st
WD = Withdrew

== Sources ==
- Gordeeva, Ekaterina. (1996). My Sergei: A Love Story. Warner Books Inc. ISBN 0-446-52087-X.
