= Christine Hough =

Canadian pair skater

Personal information
- Full name: Christine Hough-Sweeney
- Born: October 9, 1969 (age 57) Renfrew, Ontario, Canada
- Height: 1.57 m (5 ft 2 in)

Figure skating career
- Country: Canada
- Retired: 1992

Christine "Tuffy" Hough (/hʌf/ HUF; born October 9, 1969) is a Canadian former pair skater. With Doug Ladret, she is the 1988 Canadian national champion and finished in the top ten at two Winter Olympics, in 1988 and 1992.

== Career ==
Hough received her nickname, Tuffy, from her stepfather because she did daring skating moves. She competed early in her career with Kevin Wheeler, winning the 1982 novice title.

Hough teamed up with Doug Ladret in the summer of 1984. The pair won the bronze medal at 1985 Canadian nationals and finished fourth the following season.

In November 1986, Ladret sustained two skull fractures as a result of an accident while the pair was practicing a lasso lift at a rink in Cambridge, Ontario. Ladret stated, "The ice was pretty rutty. I put the lift up, and my right foot got stuck in a rut and down we went. I pulled Tuffy forward as I was falling; my first thought was to make sure she was OK. My tailbone hit first, and my neck whiplashed back." He started wearing a hockey helmet in practice but stopped after five months, finding it cumbersome. That season, Hough/Ladret returned to the national podium, taking their second bronze medal, and were assigned to their first World Championships. They finished 8th at Worlds, held in Cincinnati in March 1987.

Hough/Ladret's best season was 1987–88; they won the 1987 Skate Canada International and went on to win the national title as well. In February 1988, they represented Canada at the Winter Olympics in Calgary, ranking eighth in both segments and overall. In March, they finished 9th at the 1988 World Championship in Budapest, Hungary.

During the 1991–92 season, Hough/Ladret won their third consecutive silver medal at Canadian Nationals. In February 1992, they competed at the Winter Olympics in Albertville, France. They placed 9th in the short program, 10th in the free skate, and 9th overall. They retired from amateur skating at the end of the season.

Hough and Ladret appeared as skaters in the 1992 movie The Cutting Edge. and spent four years touring with Stars on Ice. Following a thirteen-year hiatus from performing, Hough-Sweeney took part in two seasons of Battle of the Blades, paired with Tie Domi in season 1 and Russ Courtnall in season 2.

== Personal life ==
In 1996, Hough married Boston Bruins general manager Don Sweeney, with whom she has twin sons, Jarred and Tyler, born on April 29, 1999. She currently works as a coach at the Skating Club of Boston. She and her family live in Boston.

== Results ==
(with Doug Ladret)

International
Event	84–85	85–86	86–87	87–88	88–89	89–90	90–91	91–92
Winter Olympics				8th				9th
World Champ.			8th	9th		6th	11th	9th
Skate America		4th			4th			
Skate Canada	5th	4th		1st				4th
Internat. de Paris					4th			
NHK Trophy						3rd		5th
Nations Cup							2nd	
St. Ivel/Skate Electric		2nd	1st				1st	
National
Canadian (pairs)	3rd	4th	3rd	1st	3rd	2nd	2nd	2nd
Canadian (fours)	1st				1st	1st		1st
