= Patricia Neske =

American-born German former competitive figure skater

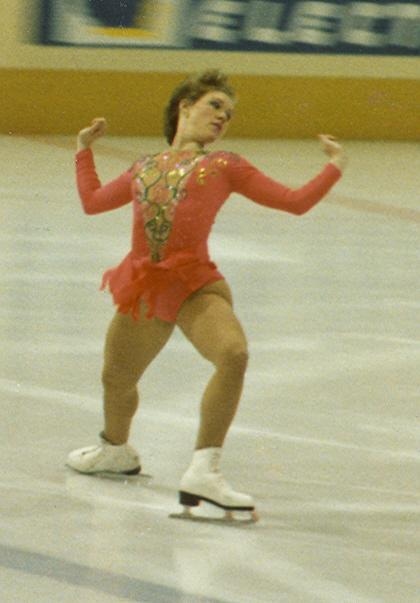
- Patricia Neske in 1989 at an ISU exhibition in West Berlin

Personal information
- Born: 19 October 1966 (age 59)
- Height: 1.58 m (5 ft 2 in)

Figure skating career
- Country: Germany; West Germany
- Retired: 1992
Medal record
Ladies' Figure Skating
Representing Germany
European Championships
Bronze medal – third place	1992 Lausanne	Ladies' Singles
Representing West Germany
European Championships
Bronze medal – third place	1989 Birmingham	Ladies' Singles

Patricia Neske (born 19 October 1966) is an American-born German former competitive figure skater. She represented Germany at the 1992 Winter Olympics, finishing 13th. She won a bronze medal at the European Championships in 1989 and 1992, and is the 1990 German national champion. She also competed at five World Championships, with her best result being a fourth-place finish in 1989.

== Personal life ==
Patricia Neske was born in California to Horst and Ingrid Neske, who had emigrated from Germany. She attended a vocational school learning about banking in Oberstdorf. In 1992, she returned to California where she attended Loyola marymount university and got her accounting degree. She has two kids

== Career ==
Neske chose to compete for Germany, representing the Düsseldorfer EG. She trained in Oberstdorf, Bavaria, coached by Peter Jonas.

In the 1984–85 season, Neske won silver at the German nationals. She finished 8th in her first appearance at the European Championships and then debuted at the World Championships, placing 12th. Over the next several years, Neske obtained silver and bronze medals at the St. Ivel International (Skate Electric) and bronze medals at Skate Canada International, Nations Cup, International de Paris, and Nebelhorn Trophy. In 1989, she also won her first bronze at the European Championships. She then placed 4th at the World Championships, achieving her career-best World result.

In the 1989–90 season, Neske won gold at the German Championships but did not reach the European podium again until 1992 when she won her second European bronze medal, earning selection for the 1992 Winter Olympics in Albertville, where she placed 13th overall. She retired from competition later that year.

== Results ==
International
Event	84–85 (FRG)	85–86 (FRG)	86–87 (FRG)	87–88 (FRG)	88–89 (FRG)	89–90 (FRG)	90–91 (GER)	91–92 (GER)
Olympics								13th
Worlds	12th				4th	7th	9th	10th
Europeans	8th				3rd	5th	5th	3rd
Skate America							4th	7th
Skate Canada		3rd			3rd	4th		
Nations Cup						3rd		
Int. de Paris				3rd				
St. Ivel				2nd		3rd		
Nebelhorn					3rd			4th
Moscow News			5th					
National
German Champ.	2nd				2nd	1st	2nd	2nd
