= Mirela Gawłowska =

Polish figure skater

Figure skating career
- Country: Poland
- Coach: Zygmunt Kaczmarczyk
- Skating club: Naprzód Janów
- Retired: c. 1989

Mirela Gawłowska (Polish pronunciation: [miˈrɛla ɡaˈvwɔfska]) is a Polish former competitive figure skater. She is a six-time Polish national champion. She qualified for the free skate at four ISU Championships – 1988 Worlds in Budapest, 1987 Europeans in Sarajevo, 1988 Europeans in Prague, and 1989 Europeans in Birmingham. She was coached by Zygmunt Kaczmarczyk. Her skating club was Naprzód Janów.

== Competitive highlights ==
International
Event	82–83	83–84	84–85	85–86	86–87	87–88	88–89
World Champ.						23rd	
European Champ.					18th	15th	WD
Prague Skate							5th
Blue Swords	9th						
National
Polish Champ.	1st		1st	1st	1st	1st	1st
WD = Withdrew
