= Maya Usova =

Russian ice dancer (born 1964)

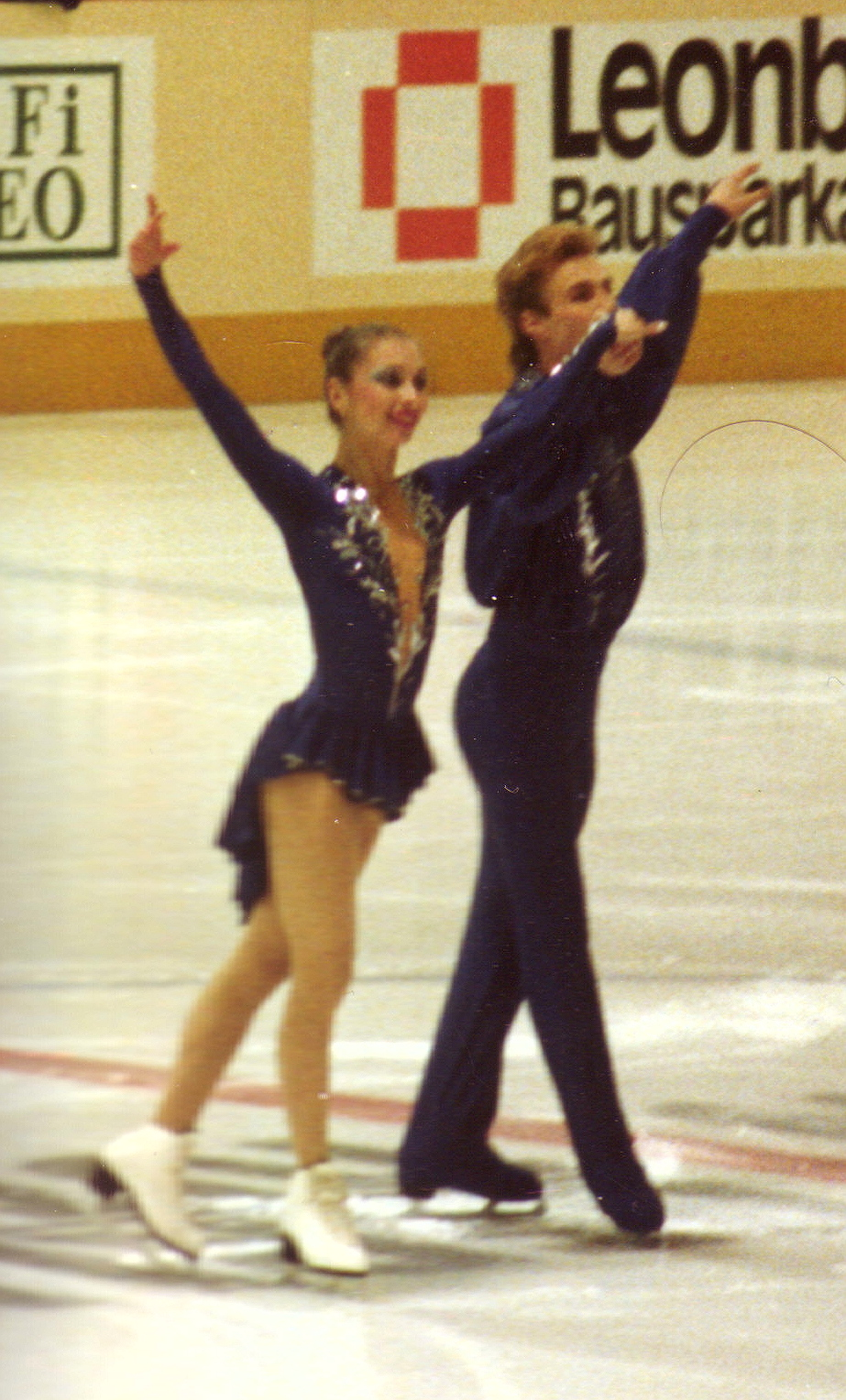
- Usova/Zhulin at a 1989 exhibition in West Berlin.

Personal information
- Full name: Maya Valentinovna Usova
- Other names: Maia Usova
- Born: 22 May 1964 (age 62) Gorky, Russian SFSR, Soviet Union
- Height: 1.60 m (5 ft 3 in)

Figure skating career
- Country: Russia
- Skating club: Profsoyuz Moskva / Sportsclub Moskva
- Retired: 1994
Medal record
Figure skating
Ice dancing
Representing Russia
Winter Olympics
Silver medal – second place	1994 Lillehammer	Ice dancing
World Championships
Gold medal – first place	1993 Prague	Ice dancing
European Championships
Bronze medal – third place	1994 Copenhagen	Ice dancing
Gold medal – first place	1993 Helsinki	Ice dancing
Representing Unified Team and CIS
Winter Olympics
Bronze medal – third place	1992 Albertville	Ice dancing
World Championships
Silver medal – second place	1992 Oakland	Ice dancing
European Championships
Silver medal – second place	1992 Lausanne	Ice dancing
Representing Soviet Union
World Championships
Bronze medal – third place	1991 Munich	Ice dancing
Bronze medal – third place	1990 Halifax	Ice dancing
Silver medal – second place	1989 Paris	Ice dancing
European Championships
Bronze medal – third place	1991 Sofia	Ice dancing
Silver medal – second place	1990 Leningrad	Ice dancing
Silver medal – second place	1989 Birmingham	Ice dancing

Maya Valentinovna Usova (Russian: Майя Валентиновна Усова; born 22 May 1964) is a Russian former ice dancer. With Alexander Zhulin, she is a two-time Olympic medalist (1994 silver, 1992 bronze), the 1993 World champion, and the 1993 European champion. They also won gold medals at Skate America, NHK Trophy, Nations Cup, and Winter Universiade. They represented the Soviet Union, the Unified Team, and Russia.

== Career ==
Maya Usova initially competed with Alexei Batalov. At the age of nine, she moved from Gorky to Moscow to train with coach Natalia Dubova. Dubova paired her with Alexander Zhulin in 1980. In 1988, they made their first appearance at the European Championships, placing fourth. The next season, they won silver at the 1989 European Championships in Birmingham, England and silver in their World Championships debut, in Paris. They maintained their silver medal standing in the world with a silver at the 1990 European Figure Skating Championships, but for the first time dropped behind the Duchesnays to third at the 1990 World Figure Skating Championships in Halifax.

After being third again at the 1991 European Figure Skating Championships, they led both the Duchesnays and Klimova & Ponomarenko into the free dance at the 1991 World Figure Skating Championships. In the free dance Usova & Zhulin skated first in the final flight and received a wide spread of marks from the judges. Critics described the program, which featured "Zhulin hopping like a rabbit around Usova, who was kneeling like a shrub" as "bizarre." They dropped to third in the free dance and third overall. They later described their 1991 free dance as "being about Paganini and his muse". Usova wore a short, Empire-style beige dress and according to writer Ellyn Kestnbaum, represented both a muse and inanimate object. Kestnbaum also reported that they skated their program with "intense emotion" and created "an overall aura of Romanticism and uncanniness", using little runs and turns on their toepicks, knee slides, and "sensuous flowing and intertwining movements" that were enhanced by their billowing costumes.

In the 1991–92 season, Usova/Zhulin won silver at the 1992 European Championships in Lausanne, Switzerland and then captured their first Olympic medal, bronze, at the 1992 Winter Olympics in Albertville, France. Usova/Zhulin ended their season with a controversial silver at the 1992 World Championships in Oakland, California despite a fall in the free dance. They moved with Dubova from Moscow to Lake Placid, New York in September 1992.

Usova and Zhulin's free skate during the 1991-1992 season, set to music from The Four Seasons by Vivaldi, centered on the theme of statues coming to life, was full of images of symmetry, parallelism, and equality. Figure skating writer Ellyn Kestnbaum described their program in this way: "It is not about sexual difference, but it does convey sexual attraction. These are passionate, eroticized statues, and the skaters' gazes are focused centripetally into the relationship, at each other's bodies and into each other's eyes". Usova described their costumes as inspired by "dinner mints".

In the 1992–93 season, Usova/Zhulin won the 1993 European Championships in Helsinki and the 1993 World Championships in Prague. This was a commanding victory as they won all four phases of the competition at both events, despite losing two first place ordinals to the up-and-coming Russians Anjelika Krylova & Vladimir Fedorov at Worlds.

The next season, they were third at the 1994 European Championships in Copenhagen, behind Jayne Torvill / Christopher Dean and Oksana Grishuk / Evgeni Platov. They entered the free dance tied for first with Torvill & Dean, and Grishuk & Platov were mathematically out of contention for the gold medal entering the free dance. However the free dance of Grishuk & Platov which handily won that phase changed the ordinals, and Usova & Zhulin were pushed to third in the free dance behind Torvill & Dean and dropped to third overall. They were heavily criticized for their new free program which was said by critics to lack speed and be too far a departure from their usual sensual and elegant style of dancing.

At the 1994 Winter Olympics in Lillehammer, Norway, they won the silver medal behind Grishuk/Platov. They entered the free dance tied for first with Torvill & Dean, with Grishuk & Platov in third, but with all 3 teams in contention for the gold by winning the free dance. They lost gold by the majority rule, Grishuk & Platov having the five first place ordinals they needed to win the free dance. After the loss Usova & Zhulin withdrew from the 1994 World Figure Skating Championships, where they had planned to end their amateur career and immediately went professional. Usova and Zhulin were known for excelling technically and artistically and according to writer Ellyn Kestnbaum, "leaned toward drama and passion".

Usova/Zhulin skated together professionally from 1994 to 1997. They toured with Champions on Ice and won the World Professional Championships. From 1998 to 2000, Usova performed with former rival, Evgeni Platov. Their career started out with mixed results, with marks as low as 4.5 at the Canadian Open, but also an upset win at the World Professional Championships. After last-place finishes in nearly all events in 1999 and 2000, Usova & Platov ceased competing. Platov later reunited with Grishuk to skate professionally while Usova retired..

From 2002 to 2004, Usova was an assistant coach to Tatiana Tarasova and Platov, working with Galit Chait / Sergei Sakhnovsky and Shizuka Arakawa. She has coached at the Igloo in Mt. Laurel, New Jersey and Odintsovo, near Moscow. She is an International Technical Specialist for Russia.

== Personal life ==
Usova and Zhulin were married in 1986 but later divorced. Zhulin claimed that their marriage was a sham to get a free apartment from the Soviet government, though Usova denied this claim. Following their personal and professional breakup, Usova was hospitalized for depression and contemplated suicide. She told the Washington Post, "I have 15 times {been treated for} depression. So many days when I cry.... All of my problems was my old partner." Zhulin apologized in a subsequent article.

Usova and Oksana Grishuk had one of the most infamous and widely covered rivalries in figure skating. Usova punched Grishuk and smashed her head into a counter at a Spago restaurant in Los Angeles in 1992, when she caught Grishuk dining with her husband and partner Zhulin. The rivalry resurfaced in 1997 when Usova, then without a partner, relocated to Grishuk's training rink. Grishuk accused her of attempting to steal her partner Evgeny Platov, and distract from her Olympic preparations by blocking her entrance to the rink while smoking cigarettes.

Usova is remarried to a Russian professor in medicine, Anatoly Orletsky. In 2010, she gave birth to their daughter, Anastasia. Off the ice, she has appeared in several Marlboro advertisements in Russia.

== Programs ==
=== With Zhulin ===
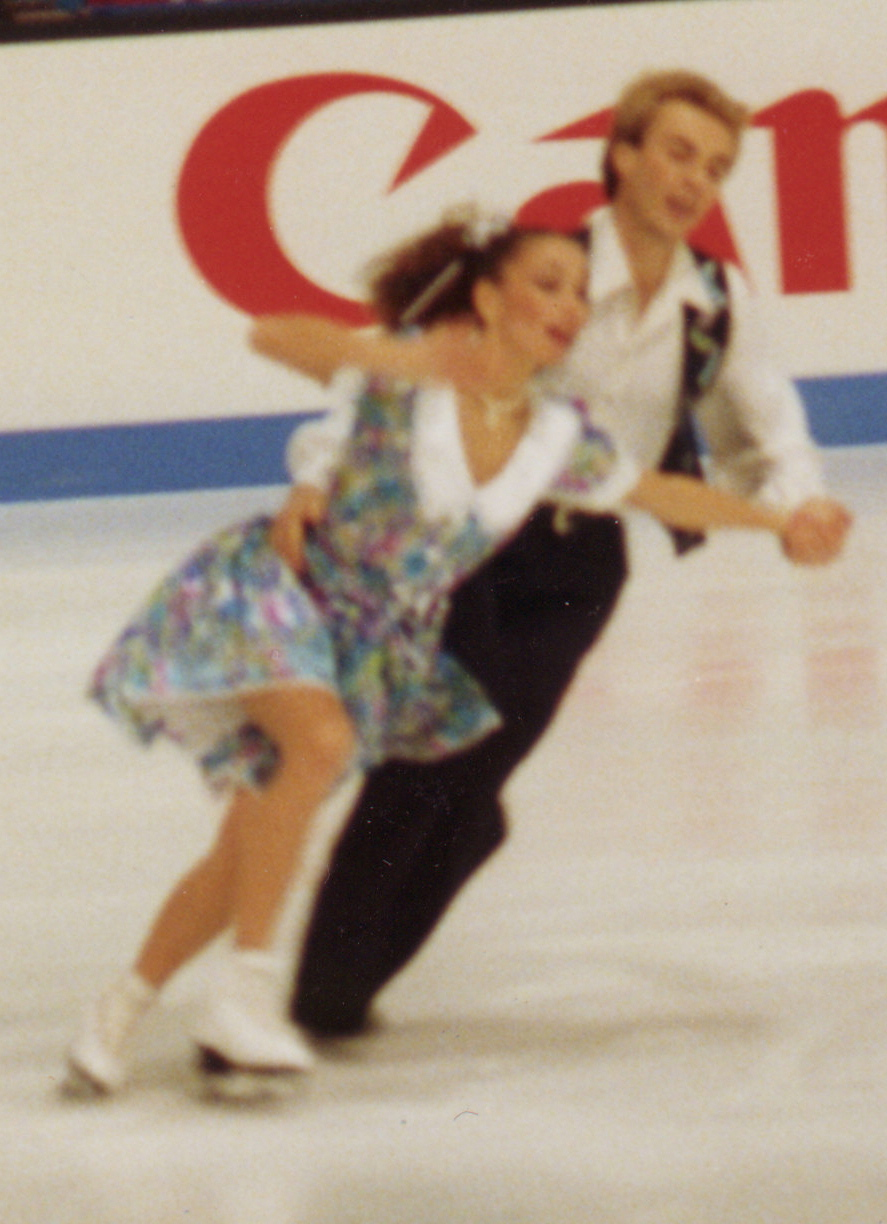
Usova/Zhulin in 1994

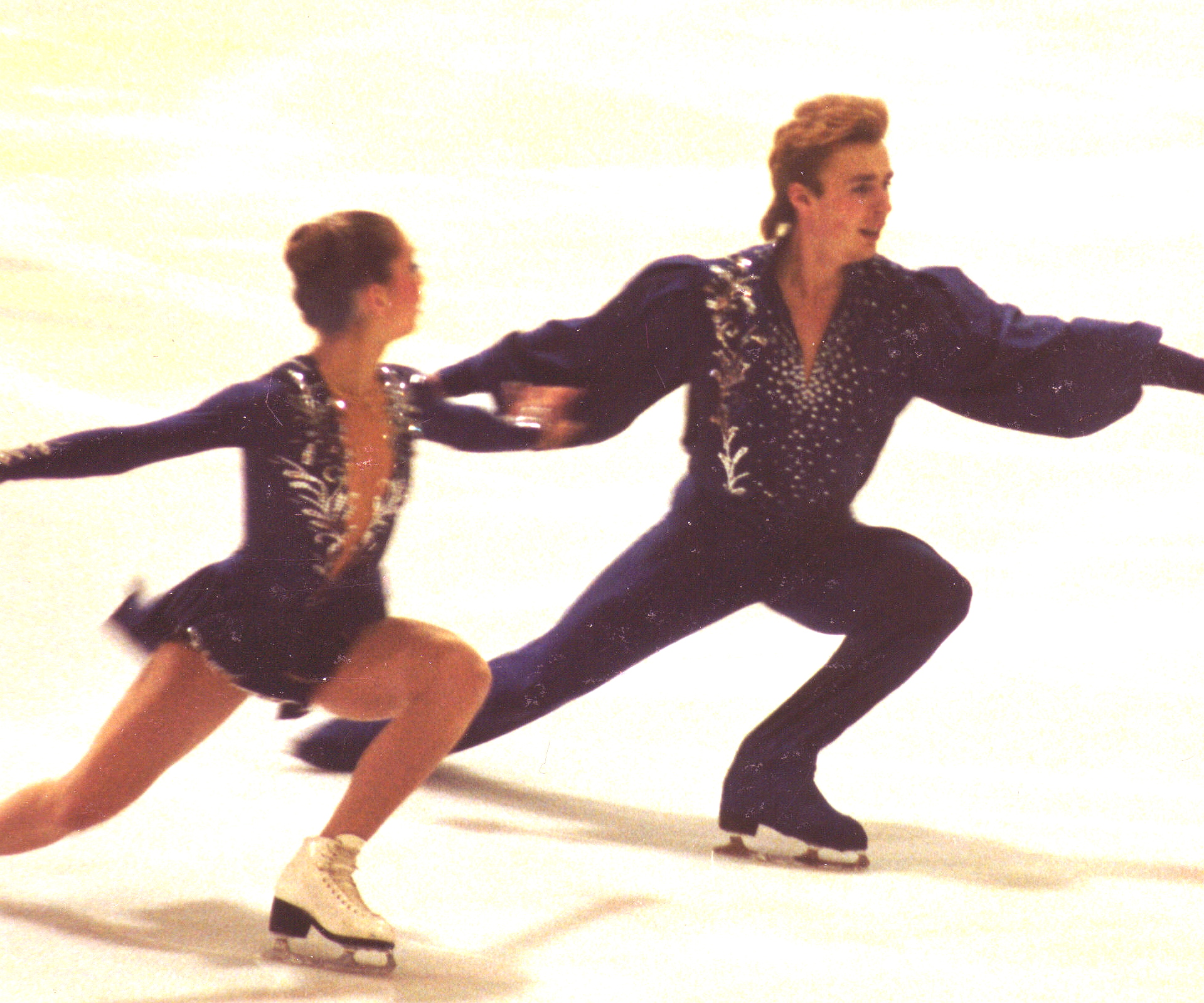
Usova/Zhulin in 1989

Season	Original dance	Free dance	Exhibition
1993–1994	A Day In The Life Of A Fool	Nights of Cabiria (Italian: Le notti di Cabiria); La Passerella di Otto e Mezzo (from 8½) by Nino Rota	Ausencias by Astor Piazzolla
1992–1993	Tales from the Vienna Woods (German: Geschichten aus dem Wienerwald)	Blues For Klook by Eddy Louiss	Ausencias; Prelude in E Minor by Frédéric Chopin; Autumn Leaves
1991–1992	Pizzicato Polka by Johann Strauss II	Four Seasons by Antonio Vivaldi	Autumn Leaves (French: Les feuilles mortes); A Paris
1990–1991	Summertime (from Porgy and Bess) by George Gershwin	Variations by Andrew Lloyd Webber	Autumn Leaves
1989–1990	Samba	Adios Nonino; Oblivion; Duo de Amor by Astor Piazzolla	
1988–1989	Black Bottom by Ray Henderson	Mars, the Bringer of War (from The Planets) by Gustav Holst; Prelude Op. 28, No. 4 in E minor by Frédéric Chopin	A Paris
1987–1988	Tango	Oriental Nights by Kai Warner	

Post-1994
- The Red Poppy

- La Belle Dame Sans Regret
  by Sting

- Windmills of your Mind
  (from the Thomas Crown Affair)
- A Man and A Woman
- Where Do I Begin
  (from Love Story)
- The Summer Knows
  (from Summer of '42)

- Prelude In C Minor
  by Sergei Rachmaninoff

- L'Oiseau (from Cirque du Soleil)

- The Shadow of Your Smile
  from The Sandpiper

- The Hunchback

- Fantasy in D Minor
  by Wolfgang Amadeus Mozart

- Duo de Amor
- Milonga Loca
- Oblivion
  by Astor Piazzolla

- Blues For Klook

=== With Platov ===
Season	Programs
2000–2001	Tango from The Addams Family; Desert Rose by Sting; Carmen by Georges Bizet
1999–2000	The Umbrellas of Cherbourg by Michel Legrand; Copa de la Vida; Historia de un Amor; Spente Le Stelle by Emma Shapplin
1998–1999	Padam, padam... by Édith Piaf; When You Came Into My Life; Moonlight Sonata by Ludwig van Beethoven

== Results ==
=== Amateur career ===
With Zhulin for the Soviet Union (URS), Commonwealth of Independent States (CIS), Unified Team at the Olympics (EUN), and Russia (RUS):

International
Event	1982–83 (URS)	1983–84 (URS)	1984–85 (URS)	1985–86 (URS)	1986–87 (URS)	1987–88 (URS)	1988–89 (URS)	1989–90 (URS)	1990–91 (URS)	1991–92 (CIS, EUN)	1992–93 (RUS)	1993–94 (RUS)
Olympics										3rd		2nd
Worlds							2nd	3rd	3rd	2nd	1st	
Europeans						4th	2nd	2nd	3rd	2nd	1st	3rd
Skate America								1st			1st	
Nations Cup								1st				
NHK Trophy							2nd		1st	1st	1st	
Moscow News		6th		4th	3rd	2nd						
Goodwill Games									2nd			
Nebelhorn				1st								
St. Gervais				1st								
St. Ivel / Electric						1st	1st					
Universiade			1st		2nd							
National
Soviet Champ.		2nd	5th	3rd	3rd	3rd	3rd	2nd	1st			
Spartakiada				1st								
USSR Cup	3rd											

=== Post-eligible career ===
Event	1994–95	1998–99
World Professional Champ.	1st	1st
