= Claudia Villiger =

Swiss figure skater

Personal information
- Other names: Claudia Dakidis-Villiger
- Born: 25 September 1969 (age 56)

Figure skating career
- Country: Switzerland
- Skating club: EC Illnau-Effretikon
- Retired: 1987

Claudia Villiger (born 25 September 1969) is a Swiss former competitive figure skater. She won bronze medals at the Nebelhorn Trophy, Golden Spin of Zagreb, and St. Ivel International, and became a three-time Swiss national champion (1985–87). Villiger placed sixth at the European Championships in 1986 and 1987. Her best placement at the World Championships was 13th in 1987.

== Competitive highlights ==
International
| Event | 82–83 | 83–84 | 84–85 | 85–86 | 86–87 |
|---|---|---|---|---|---|
| World Champ. | | | 16th | 16th | 13th |
| European Champ. | | | 7th | 6th | 6th |
| Golden Spin | | | 3rd | | |
| Nebelhorn Trophy | | | | | 3rd |
| St. Ivel International | | | 3rd | | |
International: Junior
| World Junior Champ. | 8th | 10th | | | |
National
| Swiss Champ. | | | 1st | 1st | 1st |
