= Brigitte Groh =

German figure skater

Personal information
- Nationality: German
- Born: 29 June 1966 Mannheim, West Germany
- Died: 16 November 1997 (aged 31) El Bagic, Colombia

Sport
- Sport: Figure skating

Brigitte Groh (29 June 1966 – 16 November 1997) was a German figure skater. She competed in the pairs event at the 1988 Winter Olympics.
