= John Martin (figure skater) =

British former competitive figure skater

Figure skating career
- Country: Great Britain
- Retired: 1994

John Martin is a British former competitive figure skater who competed in men's singles. He is a four-time British national silver medalist and was sent to four European Championships. Martin made his European debut in 1989, placing 19th in Birmingham, England. His best result, 14th, came at the 1993 European Championships in Helsinki, Finland.

== Competitive highlights ==
International
Event	1988–89	1989–90	1990–91	1991–92	1992–93	1993–94
European Championships	19th			16th	14th	27th
International de Paris						14th
National
British Championships	2nd			2nd	2nd	2nd
