= Pauline Lee =

Taiwanese figure skater

Pauline Lee 李博玲
Personal information
- Full name: Pauline Chen Lee
- Nationality: American; Taiwanese
- Born: 3 January 1969 (age 57)

Sport
- Sport: Figure skating

Pauline Lee (born 3 January 1969) is a professor of Chinese philosophy and religions, and an American-Taiwanese figure skater. She was the first to represent Chinese Taipei in international championships competing in the 1985 World Junior Championships, 1986 and 1987 Skate America Championships, and the 1986 and 1987 World Figure Skating Championships, and the first to qualify to skate for Chinese Taipei in the Olympics competing in the ladies' singles event at the 1988 Winter Olympics. Her publications include Li Zhi, Confucianism, and the Virtue of Desire, and she is the co-founding director of the Asian and Middle Eastern Studies Center at Saint Louis University.
