= Viktor Petrenko =

Ukrainian figure skater (born 1969)

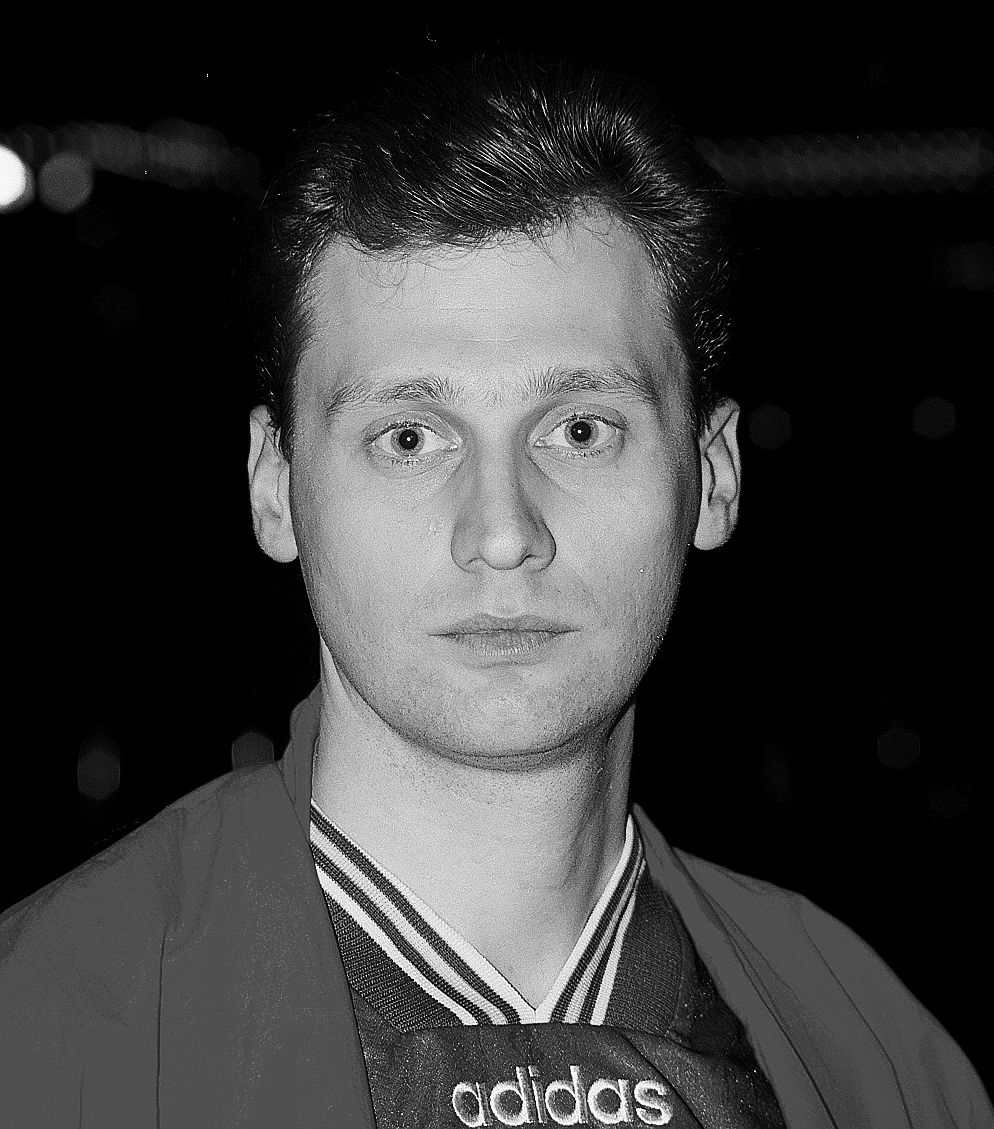
- Petrenko in 2003

Personal information
- Full name: Viktor Vasyliovych Petrenko
- Born: 27 June 1969 (age 57) Odesa, Ukrainian SSR, Soviet Union
- Height: 1.78 m (5 ft 10 in)

Figure skating career
- Country: Ukraine (1993–94); Soviet Union (1983–92)
- Discipline: Men's singles
- Retired: 1994

Medal record
Event	Gold medal – first place	Silver medal – second place	Bronze medal – third place
Olympic Games	1	0	1
World Championships	1	2	1
European Championships	3	1	2
Ukrainian Championships	1	0	0
Soviet Championships	1	4	2
World Junior Championships	1	0	0
Medal list
representing Ukraine
European Championships
Gold medal – first place	1994 Copenhagen	Singles
Ukrainian Championships
Gold medal – first place	1994 Kyiv	Singles
Medal list
representing Unified Team
Olympic Games
Gold medal – first place	1992 Albertville	Singles
Medal list
representing CIS
World Championships
Gold medal – first place	1992 Oakland	Singles
European Championships
Silver medal – second place	1992 Lausanne	Singles
Medal list
representing Soviet Union
Olympic Games
Bronze medal – third place	1988 Calgary	Singles
World Championships
Silver medal – second place	1990 Halifax	Singles
Silver medal – second place	1991 Munich	Singles
Bronze medal – third place	1988 Budapest	Singles
European Championships
Gold medal – first place	1990 Leningrad	Singles
Gold medal – first place	1991 Sofia	Singles
Bronze medal – third place	1987 Sarajevo	Singles
Bronze medal – third place	1988 Prague	Singles
Soviet Championships
Gold medal – first place	1991 Minsk	Singles
Silver medal – second place	1986 Leningrad	Singles
Silver medal – second place	1987 Vilnius	Singles
Silver medal – second place	1988 Yerevan	Singles
Silver medal – second place	1990 Leningrad	Singles
Bronze medal – third place	1984 Tashkent	Singles
Bronze medal – third place	1992 Kyiv	Singles
World Junior Championships
Gold medal – first place	1984 Sapporo	Singles

Viktor Vasyliovych Petrenko (Ukrainian: Віктор Васильович Петренко; born 27 June 1969) is a Ukrainian former competitive figure skater who represented the Soviet Union, the Unified Team, and Ukraine during his career. He is the 1992 Olympic Champion for the Unified Team. Petrenko became the first flagbearer for Ukraine.

Petrenko moved to the United States in 1994 with his family and associates, living first in Simbury, Connecticut, the site of an international skating center. He works as an International Skating Union (ISU) Technical Specialist, tours professionally, and coaches figure skating.

== Early life ==
Viktor Petrenko was born in Odesa, Ukrainian SSR, the first of two sons born to engineers Tamara and Vasyl Petrenko. They both got involved in ice skating, training and competing from a young age. His younger brother Vladimir Petrenko also became a competitive skater and the 1986 World Junior champion.

The Petrenko family spoke Russian, which had become dominant in Odesa. It was also a means of inter-ethnic communication throughout the USSR. Viktor Petrenko attended a Russian-speaking school where he chose to study English as a foreign language. Because Ukrainian was not used in his family or his school, he never learned to speak the native language of his country fluently.

Petrenko was often sick as a young child, and doctors suggested to his parents that they put him in a sport in order to improve his strength and stamina. When he was five years old, they took him to the local ice rink and started him in figure skating. At the age of nine, his talent was noticed by Ukrainian figure skating coach Galina Zmievskaya and she took him on as a pupil at Spartak in Odesa.

== Career ==
=== Rising star 1984–1988 ===
Representing the Soviet Union, Petrenko was the 1984 World Junior Champion. He won the bronze medal at the 1988 Olympic Games, and became one of the youngest male figure skating Olympic medalists. His podium finish came as a surprise, because three former World Champions Brian Orser, Brian Boitano, and Alexander Fadeev were competing in this event. Capitalizing on disastrous short and long programs by Fadeev, Petrenko skated well enough at the championships to earn the bronze.

He also won the bronze medal at the 1988 World Figure Skating Championships up against Orser and Boitano again. Fadeev withdrew from the event.

=== Disappointment 1989 ===
Expected to succeed to the position of top skater with the retirement of the Brians, Petrenko lost the Soviet Nationals to a resurgent Fadeev. At Worlds, a fall in the short program combined with a subpar long program cost him a medal. Upstart and eventual career rival Kurt Browning won a surprising victory at this event.

=== Road to Albertville 1990–1991 ===
Petrenko won his first two European Championships in 1990 and 1991. He was frustrated in trying to win a World title. He won the short program at both the 1990 and 1991 World Figure Skating Championships, but his mistakes in the long program dropped him to silver both times.

The 1991 decision was particularly close. Petrenko skated a strong program, only stepping out of a triple loop, and omitting a planned triple axel-triple toe which he turned into a triple-double. He lost in a controversial 6-3 split by the judges. Browning completed 3 triple-triples, and edged Petrenko out of the gold because of the superior technical difficulty of his program.

=== Olympic and World Champion 1992 ===
After the dissolution of the Soviet Union in December 1991, athletes from former Soviet states went to the Olympics together for the last time in 1992 on a Unified Team. Petrenko competed for this Unified Team. With a free skate that was ranked above American Paul Wylie's by seven of the nine judges, he won the gold medal, the first ever for a singles skater from the former Soviet Union. His skate was not his best, and some contested his win. His triple axel-triple toe in both programs gained him scores over both Wylie and European Champion Petr Barna in spite of the mistakes.

A month later Petrenko went to the 1992 World Championships and won the gold medal there as well, earning two 6.0's for presentation in his free program and receiving first-place ranking from all nine judges. In doing so he finally defeated his arch rival Kurt Browning, who took silver (after placing a disappointing 6th in Albertville). Petrenko used the same free program for the 3rd straight year, with his polish and familiarity gaining high marks for the artistic strength of the program.

=== Professional career and reinstatement ===
Petrenko turned professional following his Olympic win, moving to Las Vegas, Nevada. Ukraine was still struggling economically and he thought he had more opportunity in the US. When the International Skating Union ruled in 1993 that professionals could return to competitive status, Petrenko returned to Odesa, Ukraine and began training for another Olympics.

He defeated another returning competitor, Brian Boitano, to win Skate America with a commanding 8-triple long program. He won his third European Championships in January 1994, competing for the first time for the independent nation of Ukraine. He represented his homeland at the 1994 Lillehammer Olympics. It was widely expected that he, 1988 Olympic gold medalist Brian Boitano, and World Champion Kurt Browning would be the main challengers for medals. However, after the short program Petrenko was in ninth place after stepping out of his triple axel and not completing the rotation on his triple lutz, and Boitano and Browning were in eighth and twelfth respectively. His strong performance in the free skate pulled him up to a fourth-place finish.

== Later life ==
After 1994, Petrenko competed as a professional. He had many successes, including winning the prestigious Challenge of Champions event three times. It is considered the top professional event. He failed to win the other major professional event, the Landover World Professional Skating Championships, and never placed higher than 3rd.

In 1992, Petrenko had convinced his coach Galina Zmievskaya to take in Oksana Baiul, a 14-year-old Ukrainian orphan who was talented in skating. The coach became both her guardian and coach, having Baiul live with her. Petrenko covered Baiul's expenses. With their guidance, Baiul won the 1993 World Figure Skating Championship and the gold medal at the 1994 Olympic Games.

That year Petrenko married Zmievskaya's oldest daughter, Nina Milken, on 19 June 1992. Their daughter Victoria was born on 21 July 1997.

After the 1994 Winter Olympics, Petrenko and Nina, Zmievskaya, Baiul and Viktor's brother Vladimir all left Ukraine and moved to Simsbury, Connecticut, United States. Petrenko and Baiul were invited to train for competition. Zmievskaya and Vladimir Petrenko joined the coaching staff at the new International Skating Center of Connecticut.

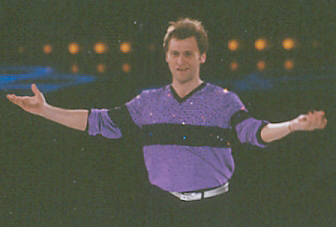
Petrenko skating at an exhibition program at the 2002 Champions on Ice show in Buffalo, New York

In 1996, Petrenko performed as the Scarecrow for the CBS television special The Wizard of Oz on Ice. In March 2001, Petrenko organized the Viktory for Kids ice show in Simsbury, Connecticut. He invited celebrity friends from the international figure skating community to perform in order to raise public awareness and funds for the thousands of children still being affected by elevated radiation levels from the Chernobyl nuclear disaster that had occurred in his Ukrainian homeland fifteen years earlier. $108,000 was raised, and later that year was used to open The Viktor Petrenko Neonatal Intensive Care Unit in Odesa, with state-of-the-art medical technology.

In October 2003, Petrenko organized a second "Viktory for Kids" show, this time in Danbury, Connecticut. In addition to Petrenko, the show included Olympic champions Ekaterina Gordeeva (with her daughter, Daria Grinkova [Petrenko's goddaughter]), Ilia Kulik, Evgeni Plushenko, Brian Boitano, and Oksana Kazakova / Artur Dimitriev.

In January 2004, Petrenko was arrested on suspicion of driving under the influence (DUI) after crashing his car into a utility pole in Connecticut and refusing to take a breathalyzer test. His record was cleared after he completed an adult alcohol education program.

Petrenko, wife Nina and mother-in-law Zmievskaya left the International Skating Center of Connecticut in 2005 and moved to New Jersey, where they began coaching together at the Ice Vault Arena in Wayne. They have coached American men's figure skater Johnny Weir since the summer of 2007.

Petrenko toured as a performing skater with the US company of Champions on Ice for a record twenty seasons, until COI went out of business after the 2007 season. He is an ISU Technical Specialist for Ukraine and was the Assistant Technical Specialist for the men's event at the 2006 Winter Olympics. In June 2008, he was elected to the Presidium of the Ukrainian Figure Skating Federation.

In 2022, amidst Russia's ongoing full scale invasion of Ukraine, Petrenko was fired from his post as vice president of the Ukrainian Figure Skating Federation (UFFK) and expelled from the organization for taking part in an event in Russia that was organized by Kremlin spokesman Dmitry Peskov's wife, Tatyana Navka.

== Programs ==
Season	Short program	Free skating	Exhibition
1993–1994	Toreador Song from Carmen by Georges Bizet	"La donna è mobile" from "Rigoletto," "Ah forse è lui" from "La Traviata," both by Giuseppe Verdi	Baila Mi by Gipsy Kings
1991–1992	Carmen by Georges Bizet	Raymond overture by Thomas; Le Cid ballet music by Jules Massenet; Waltz op.64 No.2 by Frédéric Chopin; I Vespi Siciliani overture by Giuseppe Verdi	Let's Twist Again by Chubby Checker
1987–1988	Flames of Paris by Boris Asafyev	Don Quixote by Ludwig Minkus	Ave Maria by Schubert

== Results ==
International
Event	83–84 (URS)	84–85 (URS)	85–86 (URS)	86–87 (URS)	87–88 (URS)	88–89 (URS)	89–90 (URS)	90–91 (URS)	91–92 (URS/CIS)	93–94 (UKR)
Olympics					3rd				1st	4th
Worlds		9th	5th	6th	3rd	6th	2nd	2nd	1st	
Europeans		6th	4th	3rd	3rd		1st	1st	2nd	1st
Goodwill Games								2nd		
Skate America		3rd	2nd				2nd	1st		1st
Skate Canada					3rd	2nd				
Nations Cup							2nd			1st
NHK Trophy			3rd				1st	1st		
Moscow News		3rd								
St. Ivel		2nd								
International: Junior
Junior Worlds	1st									
National
Ukrainian Champ.										1st
Soviet Champ.	3rd		2nd	2nd	2nd		2nd	1st	3rd	

Olympic Games
Preceded by honors created	Flagbearer for Ukraine; Lillehammer 1994	Succeeded by Andriy Deryzemlya
