= Neil Paterson (figure skater) =

Canadian figure skater

Personal information
- Born: April 21, 1964 (age 62) Ottawa, Ontario, Canada
- Height: 1.70 m (5 ft 7 in)

Figure skating career
- Country: Canada
- Skating club: North Shore Winter Club; Park Placa CC; Courthouse WC; Hollyburn CC
- Retired: 1988

Neil Paterson (born April 21, 1964) is a Canadian former competitive figure skater. He is the 1980 Karl Schäfer Memorial bronze medalist, 1981 Prague Skate silver medalist, and a two-time Canadian national silver medalist. His best World Championship result was 10th in 1985. He was selected to represent Canada at the 1988 Winter Olympics and finished 16th.

== Competitive highlights ==
International
Event	79–80	80–81	81–82	82–83	83–84	84–85	85–86	86–87	87–88
Olympics									16th
Worlds						10th	18th		13th
Skate Canada							4th	4th	5th
NHK Trophy				8th			7th		
Schäfer Memorial		3rd							
Nebelhorn Trophy				4th					
Prague Skate			2nd						
International: Junior
Junior Worlds	6th								
National
Canadians		1st J		7th		2nd	2nd		3rd
J = Junior level
