= Doug Ladret =

Canadian figure skater (born 1961)

Personal information
- Full name: Douglas James Ladret
- Born: November 13, 1961 (age 64) Vancouver, British Columbia, Canada
- Home town: North Vancouver, British Columbia, Canada
- Height: 1.77 m (5 ft 9 1/2 in)

Figure skating career
- Country: Canada
- Began skating: 1965
- Retired: 1992

Douglas James Ladret (born November 13, 1961) is a Canadian figure skating coach and former competitive pair skater. With Christine Hough, he is the 1987 Skate Canada International champion, 1989 NHK Trophy bronze medallist, and 1988 Canadian national champion. They competed twice at the Winter Olympics, in 1988 and 1992.

== Personal life ==
Ladret was born on November 13, 1961, in Vancouver, British Columbia, Canada. He is the fifth child of Alfred Arnold Ladret, a fisherman and logger, and Ellen Hannah Ladret, a baker and housemaker. He grew up between the fishing town of Powell River and the logging camp at Boswell in Smith Inlet, British Columbia. He developed a deep interest in music spurred on by his oldest brother's band (Alfred Spencer a.k.a. Snuffy) rehearsing in the basement of their house.

Ladret married Canadian figure skater Lara Carscadden. Their son, Nigel Hayden, was born on November 30, 2005.

== Career ==
Ladret took to the ice after one of his brothers, Greg, started figure skating in 1965. He began his partnership with Christine Hough by 1984. The pair took silver at the St. Ivel International in 1985 and gold the following year. In the 1987–88 season, they won gold at the 1987 Skate Canada International and the 1988 Canadian Championships. They were selected to compete at the 1988 Winter Olympics and placed 8th in Calgary.

Hough/Ladret received the bronze medal at the 1989 NHK Trophy, silver at the 1990 Nations Cup, and gold at the 1990 Skate Electric. Following their third consecutive national silver medal, they were sent to the 1992 Winter Olympics in Albertville, France, where they finished 9th. Concluding their ISU-eligible career, the two placed 9th at the 1992 World Championships. That final performance from their '92 Worlds was used as a model in training sessions for judging Program Components when the International Skating Union did a major overhaul of their judging system after the Salt Lake Olympic scandal of 2002.

Post competitive career - Hough & Ladret were signed to perform with Stars on Ice from 1992 through 1997 touring across North America with World & Olympic Champions. They appeared as Russian skaters, Smilkov & Brushkin, in the 1992 movie The Cutting Edge. 1997 Ladret was hired as the first Performance Director in Stars on Ice history.

1998 Ladret moved to Scottsdale, Arizona to coach at the Phoenix Coyotes practice facility with his wife, Lara. From 1999 through 2016 they produced numerous international skaters including International Champion Douglas Razzano. as well as the first pair team in ISU competition history to land a throw Quadruple jump, Tiffany Vise & Derek Trent. Ladret served as the Director of Figure Skating Development at the Ice Den in Scottsdale, Arizona and worked as a power skating specialist for ice hockey teams in the Phoenix area. 2016 through 2020, Ladret coached at the Monument Skating Academy in Colorado. He continues to work with hockey players and teams as a consultant skating coach.

== Results ==
(with Christine Hough)

International
Event	84–85	85–86	86–87	87–88	88–89	89–90	90–91	91–92
Winter Olympics				8th				9th
World Champ.			8th	9th		6th	11th	9th
Skate America		4th			4th			
Skate Canada	5th	4th		1st				4th
International de Paris					4th			
NHK Trophy						3rd		5th
Nations Cup							2nd	
St. Ivel/Skate Electric		2nd	1st				1st	
National
Canadian Champ.	3rd	4th	3rd	1st	3rd	2nd	2nd	2nd
Canadian Fours Champ.	1st				1st	1st		1st
