= Iveta Voralová =

Czech figure skater

Personal information
- Born: 7 August 1970 (age 56)

Figure skating career
- Country: Czechoslovakia
- Retired: 1989

Iveta Voralová (born 7 August 1970) is a former figure skater who represented Czechoslovakia. She won a bronze medal at the 1986 Karl Schäfer Memorial, placed ninth at the 1987 European Championships, and competed at the 1988 Winter Olympics, finishing in 20th place.

== Competitive highlights ==
International
Event	1986–87	1987–88	1988–89
Winter Olympics		20th	
World Championships	15th		
European Championships	9th	11th	20th
International de Paris			6th
Prague Skate		4th	
Schäfer Memorial	3rd		
National
Czechoslovak Champ.	1st	1st	1st
