= Stéfanie Schmid =

Swiss figure skater

Personal information
- Born: 24 October 1968 (age 57) Paris, France
- Height: 1.65 m (5 ft 5 in)

Figure skating career
- Country: Switzerland
- Skating club: CP Genève
- Retired: c. 1989

Stéfanie Schmid (born 24 October 1968) is a Swiss former competitive figure skater in ladies' singles. She is the 1986 Karl Schäfer Memorial silver medalist, the 1987 Winter Universiade silver medalist, and a two-time Swiss national champion (1988 and 1989). In February 1988, she represented Switzerland at the Olympic Winter Games in Calgary, Canada; she ranked 21st in compulsory figures, 16th in the short program, 12th in the free skate, and 15th overall. She was a member of CP Genève.

== Competitive highlights ==
International
Event	1986–87	1987–88	1988–89
Winter Olympics		15th	
World Champ.		20th	
European Champ.	15th	12th	16th
Inter. de Paris			
Schäfer Memorial	2nd		
Skate America			10th
Winter Universiade	2nd		
National
Swiss Champ.		1st	1st
