= Lia Trovati =

Italian ice dancer

Lia Trovati (born 25 April 1965) is a former competitive ice dancer who represented Italy. Along with partner Roberto Pelizzola, she won the gold medal at the Italian Figure Skating Championships in 1987 and 1988. Additionally, they won the bronze medal at Skate Canada in 1987 and competed in the 1988 Winter Olympics, finishing tenth.
