= Elina Hänninen =

Finnish figure skater

Figure skating career
- Country: Finland
- Skating club: Turun Riennon Taitoluistelu
- Retired: c. 1989

Elina Hänninen is a Finnish former competitive figure skater. She is the 1984 Nordic champion and a three-time Finnish national champion. Her skating club was Turun Riennon Taitoluistelu.

== Competitive highlights ==
International
Event	82–83	83–84	84–85	85–86	86–87	87–88	88–89
World Champ.					19th	28th	
European Champ.						23rd	22nd
Nordics		1st		3rd	2nd		
National
Finnish Champ.	1st J			1st		1st	1st
J = Junior level
