= Joanne Conway =

British former competitive figure skater

Personal information
- Full name: Joanne Conway
- Born: 11 March 1971 (age 55) Wallsend, Northumberland
- Height: 1.62 m (5 ft 4 in)

Figure skating career
- Country: Great Britain
- Skating club: Gillingham Ice Dance and Figure Skating Club
- Retired: 1992

Joanne Conway (born 11 March 1971) is a British former competitive figure skater. A six-time British national champion, she placed as high as 4th at the European Championships and 7th at the World Championships. She also competed at two Winter Olympics.

== Career ==
Conway began skating as a four-year-old, her father taking her and her siblings to the local rink on weekends. At age 12, she sustained a cut to her Achilles tendon in a collision with another skater.

Conway was coached mainly by Carlo Fassi and also spent a summer in the United States training under Robin Cousins. She would win six British national titles, claiming her first at the age of 14. She made her major championship debut at the 1986 European Championships, finishing 11th. She went on to achieve top-ten placings three times at the World Championships and four times at European Championships. Her most successful year was 1991, when she finished 4th at the European Championships and 7th at the World Championships. She also competed twice at the Winter Olympics, finishing 12th in 1988 and 18th in 1992. She was the first British woman to land a triple flip successfully in competition, at the 1991 European Championships. However she appears to have had a balance problem, and fell on the ice frequently enough to earn herself the nickname Frosty bum.

Conway retired from competitive skating in 1992 and turned professional, becoming a regular performer in the Hot Ice Show at Blackpool Pleasure Beach. She was appointed head coach in 2005. In 2008, Conway moved to coach in Spain. After returning to the UK in 2012, she worked as a coach and arena manager at Blackpool Pleasure Beach Arena. As of 2021, she is an estate agent in Lytham St Annes.

== Personal life ==
Born in Wallsend, Tyne & Wear, Conway attended Preston High School in North Shields. She was raised with two siblings, a brother and sister. Her mother worked as a nurse and her father was employed at the Fish Quay market.

In 1997, Conway divorced footballer Gary Owers after five years of marriage. She later married and divorced skating coach John Dunn, with whom she has a daughter, Saskia, and son, Haydn.

== Competitive highlights ==
International
Event	85–86	86–87	87–88	88–89	89–90	90–91	91–92
Olympics			12th				18th
Worlds		10th	10th			7th	14th
Europeans	11th		10th	6th		4th	9th
Skate America				7th			
Skate Canada		3rd	3rd				
St. Ivel	3rd	5th	3rd	2nd			
Nebelhorn	3rd						
National
British Champ.	1st	1st	1st	1st	2nd	1st	1st
