= Grzegorz Filipowski =

Polish figure skater

Personal information
- Born: 28 July 1966 (age 60) Łódź, Poland

Figure skating career
- Country: Poland
- Retired: 1992
Medal record
Representing Poland
Figure skating: Men's singles
World Championships
Bronze medal – third place	1989 Paris	Men's singles
European Championships
Silver medal – second place	1989 Birmingham	Men's singles
Bronze medal – third place	1985 Gothenburg	Men's singles
Polish Championships
Gold medal – first place	1981 Gdańsk	Men's singles

Grzegorz Filipowski (Polish pronunciation: [ˈɡʐɛɡɔʂ filiˈpɔfski]; born 28 July 1966) is a former Polish competitive figure skater. He is the 1985 European bronze medalist, the 1989 European silver medalist and the 1989 World bronze medalist.

Filipowski competed in three Winter Olympics between 1984 and 1992, with a best finish of fifth position in 1988. He missed the first half of the 1987–88 season due to a stress fracture in his left leg.

Filipowski was the first skater to perform a triple-triple combination of jumps (3 toe/3 toe) in competition. Barbara Kossowska coached him in Łódź and Rochester, Minnesota. Filipowski turned pro in 1992 and settled in Canada. He works as a coach in figure skating at the York Region Skating Academy.

== Results ==
International
Event	79–80	80–81	81–82	82–83	83–84	84–85	85–86	86–87	87–88	88–89	89–90	90–91	91–92
Olympics					12th				5th				11th
Worlds	15th	11th	13th		11th	7th	13th	5th	4th	3rd	4th		12th
Europeans		7th	9th	8th	8th	3rd	5th	4th	4th	2nd	4th		5th
Skate America								4th					
Skate Canada					2nd	2nd	3rd	3rd				2nd	
Golden Spin of Zagreb						2nd							
St. Ivel International						3rd	2nd				2nd		
Int. de Paris										2nd	2nd		6th
NHK Trophy			4th	3rd								2nd	1st
Goodwill Games												8th	
National
Polish Champ.		1st	1st	1st	1st	1st	1st						
