= 1991 World Figure Skating Championships =

Annual figure skating competition held in 1991

- Type: ISU Championship
- Date: March 12 – 17
- Season: 1990–91
- Location: Munich, Germany
- Venue: Olympiahalle

Champions
- Men's singles: (Canada) Kurt Browning
- Ladies' singles: (United States) Kristi Yamaguchi
- Pairs: (Soviet Union) Natalia Mishkutenok / Artur Dmitriev
- Ice dance: (France) Isabelle Duchesnay / Paul Duchesnay
- Previous: 1990 World Championships
- Next: 1992 World Championships

The 1991 World Figure Skating Championships were held at the Olympiahalle in Munich, Germany from March 12 to 17. Medals were awarded in men's singles, ladies' singles, pair skating, and ice dancing.

== Medal tables ==
=== Medalists ===
Discipline	Gold	Silver	Bronze
Men	(Canada) Kurt Browning	(Soviet Union) Viktor Petrenko	(United States) Todd Eldredge
Ladies	(United States) Kristi Yamaguchi	(United States) Tonya Harding	(United States) Nancy Kerrigan
Pair skating	(Soviet Union) Natalia Mishkutenok / Artur Dmitriev	(Canada) Isabelle Brasseur / Lloyd Eisler	(United States) Natasha Kuchiki / Todd Sand
Ice dancing	(France) Isabelle Duchesnay / Paul Duchesnay	(Soviet Union) Marina Klimova / Sergei Ponomarenko	(Soviet Union) Maya Usova / Alexander Zhulin

=== Medals by country ===
Rank	Nation	Gold	Silver	Bronze	Total
1	Soviet Union (URS)	1	2	1	4
2	United States (USA)	1	1	3	5
3	Canada (CAN)	1	1	0	2
4	France (FRA)	1	0	0	1
Totals (4 entries)		4	4	4	12

== Results ==
=== Men ===
Kurt Browning won his third world championship in a row. Elvis Stojko (CAN) lands the first quad in combination, the first quadruple toe loop-double toe loop combination, at the World Championships.

Rank	Name	Nation	TFP	SP	FS
1	Kurt Browning	Canada	2.0	2	1
2	Viktor Petrenko	Soviet Union	2.5	1	2
3	Todd Eldredge	United States	5.5	5	3
4	Petr Barna	Czechoslovakia	5.5	3	4
5	Christopher Bowman	United States	7.0	4	5
6	Elvis Stojko	Canada	9.5	7	6
7	Michael Slipchuk	Canada	12.0	8	8
8	Alexei Urmanov	Soviet Union	12.0	6	9
9	Éric Millot	France	14.5	9	10
10	Masakazu Kagiyama	Japan	16.0	10	11
11	Paul Wylie	United States	17.0	20	7
12	Oula Jääskeläinen	Finland	19.5	13	13
13	Oliver Höner	Switzerland	20.0	12	14
14	Jung Sung-il	South Korea	20.5	17	12
15	Mirko Eichhorn	Germany	20.5	11	15
16	Steven Cousins	United Kingdom	25.0	18	16
17	Cameron Medhurst	Australia	26.0	16	18
18	Daniel Weiss	Germany	26.5	19	17
19	Gilberto Viadana	Italy	26.5	15	19
20	Ronny Winkler	Germany	27.0	14	20
Free skating not reached
21	Ralph Burghart	Austria		21	
22	Viacheslav Zagorodniuk	Soviet Union		22	
23	Cornel Gheorghe	Romania		23	
24	Jan Erik Digernes	Norway		24	
25	Henrik Walentin	Denmark		25	
26	Péter Kovács	Hungary		26	
27	David Liu	Chinese Taipei		27	
28	Tomislav Cizmesija	Yugoslavia		28	
29	Maarten van Mechelen	Luxembourg		29	
30	Jorge La Farga	Spain		30	
31	Nikolai Tonev	Bulgaria		31	
32	Alexandre Geers	Belgium		32	
33	Ricardo Olavarrieta	Mexico		33	

=== Ladies ===
The U.S. became the first nation to ever sweep the ladies' podium at a World Championships.

Midori Ito and Laetitia Hubert collided with each other during a practice session. In the short program, Ito stumbled over an opening in the boards and into a camera but was back on the ice after three seconds. Tonya Harding became the first American woman to perform a triple axel at an international event.

Rank	Name	Nation	TFP	SP	FS
1	Kristi Yamaguchi	United States	1.5	1	1
2	Tonya Harding	United States	3.0	2	2
3	Nancy Kerrigan	United States	5.5	5	3
4	Midori Ito	Japan	5.5	3	4
5	Surya Bonaly	France	8.0	4	6
6	Josée Chouinard	Canada	9.0	8	5
7	Joanne Conway	United Kingdom	10.5	7	7
8	Marina Kielmann	Germany	11.0	6	8
9	Patricia Neske	Germany	13.5	9	9
10	Julia Vorobieva	Soviet Union	17.0	12	11
11	Junko Yaginuma	Japan	17.0	10	12
12	Chen Lu	China	18.0	16	10
13	Simone Lang	Germany	18.5	11	13
14	Mari Asanuma	Japan	20.5	13	14
15	Lenka Kulovaná	Czechoslovakia	22.5	15	15
16	Anisette Torp-Lind	Denmark	23.0	14	16
17	Zuzanna Szwed	Poland	26.5	19	17
18	Lisa Sargeant	Canada	27.0	18	18
19	Natalia Gorbenko	Soviet Union	27.5	17	19
20	Lily Lyoonjung Lee	South Korea	30.0	20	20
Free skating not reached
21	Marion Krijgsman	Netherlands		21	
22	Cathrin Degler	Germany		22	
23	Tamara Téglássy	Hungary		23	
24	Beatrice Gelmini	Italy		24	
25	Helene Persson	Sweden		25	
26	Laetitia Hubert	France		26	
27	Sabrina Tschudi	Switzerland		27	
28	Željka Čižmešija	Yugoslavia		28	
29	Mila Kajas	Finland		29	
30	Tamara Heggen	Australia		30	
31	Marta Andrade	Spain		31	
32	Milena Marinovich	Bulgaria		32	
33	Anita Thorenfeldt	Norway		33	
34	Isabelle Balhan	Belgium		34	
35	Christine Czerni	Austria		35	
36	Rosanna Blong	New Zealand		36	
37	Diana Marcos	Mexico		37	

=== Pairs ===
Rank	Name	Nation	TFP	SP	FS
1	Natalia Mishkutenok / Artur Dmitriev	Soviet Union	2.0	2	1
2	Isabelle Brasseur / Lloyd Eisler	Canada	2.5	1	2
3	Natasha Kuchiki / Todd Sand	United States	5.0	4	3
4	Elena Bechke / Denis Petrov	Soviet Union	6.5	3	5
5	Evgenia Shishkova / Vadim Naumov	Soviet Union	7.5	7	4
6	Radka Kovaříková / René Novotný	Czechoslovakia	8.5	5	6
7	Peggy Schwarz / Alexander König	Germany	10.0	6	7
8	Stacey Ball / Jean-Michel Bombardier	Canada	12.0	8	8
9	Calla Urbanski / Rocky Marval	United States	14.5	9	10
10	Jenni Meno / Scott Wendland	United States	15.0	12	9
11	Christine Hough / Doug Ladret	Canada	16.0	10	11
12	Anuschka Gläser / Stefan Pfrengle	Germany	17.5	11	12
13	Cheryl Peake / Andrew Naylor	United Kingdom	19.5	13	13
14	Anna Gorecki / Arkadius Gorecki	Germany	23.0	18	14
15	Rena Inoue / Tomoaki Koyama	Japan	23.0	16	15
16	Danielle Carr / Stephen Carr	Australia	23.0	14	16
17	Anna Tabacchi / Massimo Salvade	Italy	26.5	19	17
18	Saskia Bourgeois / Guy Bourgeois	Switzerland	26.5	17	18
19	Katarzyna Głowacka / Krzysztof Korcarz	Poland	26.5	15	19

=== Ice dancing ===
The judges voted two couples (from Czechoslovakia and Poland) exactly the same (each 12 placings in compulsory dance 2). The event took place on 15th March 1991.

Rank	Name	Nation	TFP	C1	C2	OD	FD
1	Isabelle Duchesnay / Paul Duchesnay	France	2.8	3	3	1	1
2	Marina Klimova / Sergei Ponomarenko	Soviet Union	4.6	2	2	3	2
3	Maya Usova / Alexander Zhulin	Soviet Union	4.6	1	1	2	3
4	Oksana Grishuk / Evgeni Platov	Soviet Union	8.2	5	4	4	4
5	Klára Engi / Attila Tóth	Hungary	9.8	4	5	5	5
6	Stefania Calegari / Pasquale Camerlengo	Italy	12.0	6	6	6	6
7	Susanna Rahkamo / Petri Kokko	Finland	14.4	8	8	7	7
8	Dominique Yvon / Frédéric Palluel	France	15.6	7	7	8	8
9	April Sargent / Russ Witherby	United States	19.0	9	9	9	10
10	Jacqueline Petr / Mark Janoschak	Canada	21.0	10	10	10	11
11	Elizabeth Punsalan / Jerod Swallow	United States	22.0	12	17	12	9
12	Kateřina Mrázová / Martin Šimeček	Czechoslovakia	23.4	11	13	11	12
13	Małgorzata Grajcar / Andrzej Dostatni	Poland	25.8	13	12	13	13
14	Isabelle Sarech / Xavier Debernis	France	28.6	15	11	14	15
15	Anna Croci / Luca Mantovani	Italy	29.2	14	14	16	14
16	Michelle McDonald / Martin Smith	Canada	31.4	16	16	15	16
17	Jennifer Goolsbee / Hendryk Schamberger	Germany	33.6	17	15	17	17
18	Ann Hall / Jason Blomfield	United Kingdom	37.0	19	19	19	18
19	Saskia Stahler / Sven Authorsen	Germany	37.0	18	18	18	19
20	Diane Gerencser / Bernard Columberg	Switzerland	40.6	21	22	20	20
Free dance not reached
21	Kaoru Takino / Kenji Takino	Japan		20	20	21	
22	Daria-Larissa Maritczak / Ihor-Andrij Maritczak	Austria		23	23	22	
23	Monica MacDonald / Duncan Smart	Australia		22	21	23	
24	Katri Uski / Juha Sasi	Finland		24	24	24	
25	Maria Hadjiiska / Hristo Nikolov	Bulgaria		25	25	25	
26	Park Jun-hee / You Jong-hyun	South Korea		26	26	26	
