= 1992 World Figure Skating Championships =

Annual figure skating competition held in 1992

- Type: ISU Championship
- Date: March 24 – 29
- Season: 1991–92
- Location: Oakland, USA
- Host: U.S. Figure Skating
- Venue: Oakland-Alameda County Coliseum Arena

Champions
- Men's singles: Viktor Petrenko
- Ladies' singles: (United States) Kristi Yamaguchi
- Pairs: Natalia Mishkutenok / Artur Dmitriev
- Ice dance: Marina Klimova / Sergei Ponomarenko
- Previous: 1991 World Championships
- Next: 1993 World Championships

The 1992 World Figure Skating Championships were held at the Oakland-Alameda County Coliseum Arena in Oakland, California, USA from March 24 to 29. Medals were awarded in men's singles, ladies' singles, pair skating, and ice dancing.

== Medal tables ==
=== Medalists ===
Discipline	Gold	Silver	Bronze
Men	Viktor Petrenko	(Canada) Kurt Browning	(Canada) Elvis Stojko
Ladies	(United States) Kristi Yamaguchi	(United States) Nancy Kerrigan	(China) Chen Lu
Pair skating	Natalia Mishkutenok / Artur Dmitriev	(Czechoslovakia) Radka Kovaříková / René Novotný	(Canada) Isabelle Brasseur / Lloyd Eisler
Ice dancing	Marina Klimova / Sergei Ponomarenko	Maya Usova / Alexander Zhulin	Oksana Grishuk / Evgeni Platov

=== Medals by country ===
Rank	Nation	Gold	Silver	Bronze	Total
1	CIS (CIS)	3	1	1	5
2	United States (USA)	1	1	0	2
3	Canada (CAN)	0	1	2	3
4	Czechoslovakia (TCH)	0	1	0	1
5	China (CHN)	0	0	1	1
Totals (5 entries)		4	4	4	12

== Results ==
=== Men ===
Rank	Name	Nation	TFP	SP	FS
1	Viktor Petrenko	CIS	1.5	1	1
2	Kurt Browning	Canada	3.5	3	2
3	Elvis Stojko	Canada	5.0	4	3
4	Christopher Bowman	United States	7.5	5	5
5	Mark Mitchell	United States	8.0	8	4
6	Petr Barna	Czechoslovakia	8.0	2	7
7	Todd Eldredge	United States	9.0	6	6
8	Alexei Urmanov	CIS	12.5	7	9
9	Philippe Candeloro	France	15.5	15	8
10	Viacheslav Zagorodniuk	CIS	16.0	12	10
11	Cornel Gheorghe	Romania	16.0	10	11
12	Grzegorz Filipowski	Poland	17.5	11	12
13	Michael Slipchuk	Canada	20.5	9	16
14	Konstantin Kostin	Latvia	22.0	16	14
15	Mirko Eichhorn	Germany	22.0	14	15
16	Steven Cousins	United Kingdom	23.5	21	13
17	Ralph Burghart	Austria	26.5	17	18
18	Cameron Medhurst	Australia	27.0	20	17
19	Masakazu Kagiyama	Japan	27.5	13	21
20	Gilberto Viadana	Italy	30.0	22	19
21	Michael Tyllesen	Denmark	31.0	18	22
22	Zhongyi Jiao	China	31.5	23	20
23	Mitsuhiro Murata	Japan	33.5	19	24
24	Jan Erik Digernes	Norway	35.0	24	23
Free skating not reached
25	Christopher Blong	New Zealand		25	
26	Alexander Chang	Chinese Taipei		26	
27	Tomislav Cizmesija	Croatia		27	
28	Ivan Dinev	Bulgaria		28	
29	Jorge La Farga	Spain		29	
30	Oula Jääskeläinen	Finland		30	
31	Kim Se-yol	South Korea		31	
32	Péter Kovács	Hungary		32	
33	Axel Médéric	France		33	
34	Patrick Meier	Switzerland		34	
35	Dino Quattrocecere	South Africa		35	

=== Ladies ===
Rank	Name	Nation	TFP	SP	FS
1	Kristi Yamaguchi	United States	1.5	1	1
2	Nancy Kerrigan	United States	3.5	3	2
3	Chen Lu	China	5.0	2	4
4	Laëtitia Hubert	France	5.5	5	3
5	Josée Chouinard	Canada	8.0	6	5
6	Tonya Harding	United States	8.0	4	6
7	Alice Sue Claeys	Belgium	12.0	8	8
8	Yuka Sato	Japan	12.5	11	7
9	Karen Preston	Canada	12.5	7	9
10	Patricia Neske	Germany	14.5	9	10
11	Surya Bonaly	France	17.0	10	12
12	Marina Kielmann	Germany	17.5	13	11
13	Tatiana Rachkova	CIS	21.5	17	13
14	Joanne Conway	United Kingdom	22.0	12	16
15	Charlene Von Saher	United Kingdom	22.5	15	15
16	Nathalie Krieg	Switzerland	23.5	19	14
17	Krisztina Czakó	Hungary	25.0	16	17
18	Lily Lyoonjung Lee	South Korea	26.0	14	19
19	Junko Yaginuma	Japan	27.0	18	18
20	Anisette Torp-Lind	Denmark	30.5	21	20
21	Irena Zemanová	Czechoslovakia	32.0	22	21
22	Helene Persson	Sweden	33.5	23	22
23	Tamara Heggen	Australia	34.0	20	24
24	Alma Lepina	Latvia	35.0	24	23
Free skating not reached
25	Mojca Kopač	Slovenia		25	
26	Julia Vorobieva	CIS		26	
27	Viktoria Dimitrova	Bulgaria		27	
28	Zuzanna Szwed	Poland		28	
29	Marion Krijgsman	Netherlands		29	
30	Olga Vassiljeva	Estonia		30	
31	Laia Papell	Spain		31	
32	Željka Čižmešija	Croatia		32	
33	Margaret Schlater	Italy		33	
34	Mila Kajas	Finland		34	
35	Rosanna Blong	New Zealand		35	
36	Anita Thorenfeldt	Norway		36	
37	Edita Katkauskaite	Lithuania		37	
38	Janie La-lin Weng	Chinese Taipei		38	
39	Juanita-Anne Yorke	South Africa		39	
40	Lidija Hodzar	Yugoslavia		40	

=== Pairs ===
Rank	Name	Nation	TFP	SP	FS
1	Natalia Mishkutenok / Artur Dmitriev	CIS	1.5	1	1
2	Radka Kovaříková / René Novotný	Czechoslovakia	3.5	3	2
3	Isabelle Brasseur / Lloyd Eisler	Canada	4.0	2	3
4	Elena Bechke / Denis Petrov	CIS	7.0	6	4
5	Evgenia Shishkova / Vadim Naumov	CIS	7.0	4	5
6	Peggy Schwarz / Alexander König	Germany	10.0	8	6
7	Calla Urbanski / Rocky Marval	United States	10.5	7	7
8	Natasha Kuchiki / Todd Sand	United States	11.5	5	8
9	Christine Hough / Doug Ladret	Canada	15.0	12	9
10	Sherry Ball / Kris Wirtz	Canada	15.0	10	10
11	Jenni Meno / Scott Wendland	United States	15.5	9	11
12	Leslie Monod / Cédric Monod	Switzerland	18.5	13	12
13	Anuschka Gläser / Stefan Pfrengle	Germany	18.5	11	13
14	Danielle Carr / Stephen Carr	Australia	21.0	14	14
15	Anna Tabacchi / Massimo Salvade	Italy	24.5	19	15
16	Katarzyna Głowacka / Krzysztof Korcarz	Poland	24.5	17	16
17	Kathryn Pritchard / Jason Briggs	United Kingdom	25.5	15	18
18	Elaine Asanakis / Mark Naylor	Greece	26.0	18	17
19	Line Haddad / Sylvain Privé	France	27.0	16	19
20	Choi Jung-hoo / Lee Yong-min	South Korea	30.0	20	20

=== Ice dancing ===
Rank	Name	Nation	TFP	C1	C2	OD	FD
1	Marina Klimova / Sergei Ponomarenko	CIS	2.0	1	1	1	1
2	Maya Usova / Alexander Zhulin	CIS	4.0	2	2	2	2
3	Oksana Grishuk / Evgeni Platov	CIS	6.0	3	3	3	3
4	Stefania Calegari / Pasquale Camerlengo	Italy	8.0	4	4	4	4
5	Susanna Rahkamo / Petri Kokko	Finland	10.0	5	5	5	5
6	Sophie Moniotte / Pascal Lavanchy	France	12.0	6	6	6	6
7	Dominique Yvon / Frédéric Palluel	France	14.0	7	7	7	7
8	Kateřina Mrázová / Martin Šimeček	Czechoslovakia	16.4	8	10	8	8
9	April Sargent / Russ Witherby	United States	17.8	9	8	9	9
10	Aliki Stergiadu / Juris Razgulaevs	Latvia	19.8	10	9	10	10
11	Jennifer Goolsbee / Hendryk Schamberger	Germany	22.4	12	12	11	11
12	Jacqueline Petr / Mark Janoschak	Canada	23.6	11	11	12	12
13	Anna Croci / Luca Mantovani	Italy	26.0	13	13	13	13
14	Regina Woodward / Csaba Szentpétery	Hungary	28.0	14	14	14	14
15	Rachel Mayer / Peter Breen	United States	30.0	15	15	15	15
16	Penny Mann / Juan Carlos Noria	Canada	32.0	16	16	16	16
17	Margarita Drobiazko / Povilas Vanagas	Lithuania	34.0	17	17	17	17
18	Valérie Le Tensorer / Jörg Kienzle	Switzerland	37.0	19	22	18	18
19	Melanie Bruce / Andrew Place	United Kingdom	37.6	18	18	19	19
20	Agnieszka Domańska / Marcin Głowacki	Poland	40.2	22	19	20	20
21	Albena Denkova / Hristo Nikolov	Bulgaria	42.0	21	21	21	21
22	Kaoru Takino / Kenji Takino	Japan	43.2	20	20	22	22
23	Noemi Vedres / Endre Szentirmai	Hungary	46.0	23	23	23	23
24	Monica MacDonald / Duncan Smart	Australia	48.0	24	24	24	24
Free dance not reached
25	Jung Sung-min / Jung Sung-ho	South Korea		25	25	25	
26	Fiona Kirk / Clinton King	South Africa		26	26	26	
