= 1990 World Figure Skating Championships =

Annual figure skating competition held in 1990

- Type: ISU Championship
- Date: March 6 – 11
- Season: 1989–90
- Location: Halifax, Canada
- Host: Canadian Figure Skating Association
- Venue: Halifax Metro Centre

Champions
- Men's singles: (Canada) Kurt Browning
- Ladies' singles: (United States) Jill Trenary
- Pairs: (Soviet Union) Ekaterina Gordeeva / Sergei Grinkov
- Ice dance: (Soviet Union) Marina Klimova / Sergei Ponomarenko
- Previous: 1989 World Championships
- Next: 1991 World Championships

The 1990 World Figure Skating Championships were held at the Halifax Metro Centre in Halifax, Canada from March 6 to 11. Medals were awarded in men's singles, ladies' singles, pair skating, and ice dancing.

== Medal tables ==
=== Medalists ===
Discipline	Gold	Silver	Bronze
Men	(Canada) Kurt Browning	(Soviet Union) Viktor Petrenko	(United States) Christopher Bowman
Ladies	(United States) Jill Trenary	(Japan) Midori Ito	(United States) Holly Cook
Pair skating	(Soviet Union) Ekaterina Gordeeva / Sergei Grinkov	(Canada) Isabelle Brasseur / Lloyd Eisler	(Soviet Union) Natalia Mishkutenok / Artur Dmitriev
Ice dancing	(Soviet Union) Marina Klimova / Sergei Ponomarenko	(France) Isabelle Duchesnay / Paul Duchesnay	(Soviet Union) Maya Usova / Alexander Zhulin

=== Medals by country ===
Rank	Nation	Gold	Silver	Bronze	Total
1	Soviet Union (URS)	2	1	2	5
2	Canada (CAN)	1	1	0	2
3	United States (USA)	1	0	2	3
4	France (FRA)	0	1	0	1
4	Japan (JPN)	0	1	0	1
Totals (5 entries)		4	4	4	12

== Results ==
=== Men ===
Rank	Name	Nation	TFP	CF	SP	FS	SP+FS
1	Kurt Browning	Canada	3.0	2	2	1	
2	Viktor Petrenko	Soviet Union	3.8	3	1	2	
3	Christopher Bowman	United States	7.8	6	4	3	
4	Grzegorz Filipowski	Poland	9.2	4	6	4	
5	Todd Eldredge	United States	11.6	7	3	7	
6	Petr Barna	Czechoslovakia	12.4	5	9	5	
7	Richard Zander	West Germany	14.6	1	7	10	
8	Viacheslav Zagorodniuk	Soviet Union	16.0	10	5	9	
9	Elvis Stojko	Canada	17.2	16	8	6	
10	Paul Wylie	United States	19.6	8	14	8	
11	Michael Slipchuk	Canada	22.6	14	10	11	
12	Cameron Medhurst	Australia	23.4	12	11	12	
13	Oliver Höner	Switzerland	28.4	9	13	17	
14	Philippe Candeloro	France	29.8	19	12	15	
15	Jung Sung-il	South Korea	30.2	18	15	14	
16	Alessandro Riccitelli	Italy	31.4	13	17	16	
17	András Száraz	Hungary	33.6	15	16	18	
18	Steven Cousins	United Kingdom	33.8	25	18	13	
19	Ralph Burghart	Austria	34.8	11	19	19	
20	Oula Jääskeläinen	Finland	39.4	17	21	20	
Free skating not reached
21	Mirko Eichhorn	East Germany		22	20		
22	Peter Johansson	Sweden		20	22		
23	Lars Dresler	Denmark		21	24		
24	Tatsuya Fujii	Japan		24	26		
25	Jan Erik Digernes	Norway		30	23		
26	Cornel Gheorghe	Romania		28	25		
27	Alcuin Schulten	Netherlands		23	29		
28	David Liu	Chinese Taipei		27	28		
29	Stephen Carr	Australia		29	27		
30	Alexandre Geers	Belgium		26	31		
31	Alexander Mladenov	Bulgaria		31	30		

=== Ladies ===
Rank	Name	Nation	TFP	CF	OP	FS
1	Jill Trenary	United States	5.4	1	5	2
2	Midori Ito	Japan	5.6	10	1	1
3	Holly Cook	United States	7.4	4	3	4
4	Kristi Yamaguchi	United States	7.8	9	2	3
5	Natalia Lebedeva	Soviet Union	9.2	2	4	6
6	Lisa Sargeant	Canada	11.4	7	6	5
7	Patricia Neske	West Germany	13.0	3	8	7
8	Evelyn Großmann	East Germany	18.2	12	9	8
9	Surya Bonaly	France	20.2	15	7	10
10	Marina Kielmann	West Germany	21.2	8	15	9
11	Tamara Téglássy	Hungary	24.0	11	11	13
12	Junko Yaginuma	Japan	25.8	19	12	11
13	Beatrice Gelmini	Italy	26.4	6	10	18
14	Yuka Sato	Japan	28.0	16	16	12
15	Tanja Krienke	East Germany	31.2	13	20	14
16	Sabine Contini	Italy	31.2	21	13	15
17	Lily Lyoonjung Lee	South Korea	31.6	18	14	16
18	Željka Čižmešija	Yugoslavia	32.8	5	18	20
19	Helene Persson	Sweden	36.4	14	23	17
20	Anisette Torp-Lind	Denmark	38.4	17	21	19
Free skating not reached
21	Laëtitia Hubert	France		25	17	
22	Emma Murdoch	United Kingdom		23	19	
23	Mirjam Wehrli	Switzerland		22	22	
24	Marcela Kochollova	Czechoslovakia		20	24	
25	Nathalie Crothers	Australia		24	27	
26	Mari Niskanen	Finland		26	26	
27	Milena Marinovich	Bulgaria		29	25	
28	Sandrine Goes	Belgium		27	28	
29	Diana Marcos	Mexico		28	29	

=== Pairs ===
Rank	Name	Nation	TFP	SP	FS
1	Ekaterina Gordeeva / Sergei Grinkov	Soviet Union	1.5	1	1
2	Isabelle Brasseur / Lloyd Eisler	Canada	4.0	4	2
3	Natalia Mishkutenok / Artur Dmitriev	Soviet Union	4.0	2	3
4	Larisa Selezneva / Oleg Makarov	Soviet Union	5.5	3	4
5	Kristi Yamaguchi / Rudy Galindo	United States	7.5	5	5
6	Christine Hough / Doug Ladret	Canada	9.5	7	6
7	Mandy Wötzel / Axel Rauschenbach	East Germany	10.0	6	7
8	Radka Kovaříková / René Novotný	Czechoslovakia	12.0	8	8
9	Cindy Landry / Lyndon Johnston	Canada	14.0	10	9
10	Peggy Schwarz / Alexander König	East Germany	14.5	9	10
11	Natasha Kuchiki / Todd Sand	United States	16.5	11	11
12	Anuschka Gläser / Stefan Pfrengle	West Germany	18.0	12	12
13	Sharon Carz / Doug Williams	United States	19.5	13	13
14	Henriette Worner / Andreas Sigurdsson	West Germany	21.0	14	14
15	Catherine Barker / Michael Aldred	United Kingdom	23.0	16	15
16	Danielle Carr / Stephen Carr	Australia	23.5	15	16

=== Ice dancing ===
Rank	Name	Nation	TFP	CD	OD	FD
1	Marina Klimova / Sergei Ponomarenko	Soviet Union	3.0	1	1	2
2	Isabelle Duchesnay / Paul Duchesnay	France	3.4	3	2	1
3	Maya Usova / Alexander Zhulin	Soviet Union	5.6	2	3	3
4	Susan Wynne / Joseph Druar	United States	8.4	5	4	4
5	Oksana Grishuk / Evgeni Platov	Soviet Union	10.4	6	5	5
6	Susanna Rahkamo / Petri Kokko	Finland	13.0	7	7	6
7	Jo Anne Borlase / Martin Smith	Canada	15.0	8	8	7
8	April Sargent / Russ Witherby	United States	17.0	9	9	8
9	Michelle McDonald / Mark Mitchell	Canada	19.0	10	10	9
10	Stefania Calegari / Pasquale Camerlengo	Italy	21.0	11	11	10
11	Ivana Střondalová / Milan Brzý	Czechoslovakia	23.4	13	12	11
12	Isabelle Sarech / Xavier Debernis	France	25.2	12	14	12
13	Małgorzata Grajcar / Andrzej Dostatni	Poland	26.4	14	13	13
14	Anna Croci / Luca Mantovani	Italy	29.0	15	15	14
15	Monika Mandikova / Oliver Pekar	Czechoslovakia	31.0	16	16	15
16	Regina Woodward / Csaba Szentpéteri	Hungary	33.0	17	17	16
17	Lynn Burton / Andrew Place	United Kingdom	36.4	20	19	17
18	Christelle Gauthier / Alberick Dalongeville	France	37.0	18	18	19
19	Kaoru Takino / Kenji Takino	Japan	37.6	19	20	18
WD	Klára Engi / Attila Tóth	Hungary	DNF	4	6	
Free dance not reached
21	Ann Hall / Jason Blomfield	United Kingdom		22	21	
22	Petra Zietemann / Frank Ladd-Oshiro	West Germany		21	22	
23	Krisztina Kerekes / Gabor Kolescanszky	Hungary		23	23	
24	Diane Gerencser / Bernard Columberg	Switzerland		24	24	
25	Monica MacDonald / Duncan Smart	Australia		25	24	
26	Petia Gavazova / Nikolai Tonev	Bulgaria		26	26	
27	Park Kyung-sook / Han Seung-jong	South Korea		27	27	

- WD = Withdrew
