= 1989 World Figure Skating Championships =

Annual figure skating competition held in 1989

- Type: ISU Championship
- Date: March 14 – 19
- Season: 1988–89
- Location: Paris, France
- Venue: Palais Omnisports de Paris-Bercy

Champions
- Men's singles: (Canada) Kurt Browning
- Ladies' singles: (Japan) Midori Ito
- Pairs: (Soviet Union) Ekaterina Gordeeva / Sergei Grinkov
- Ice dance: (Soviet Union) Marina Klimova / Sergei Ponomarenko
- Previous: 1988 World Championships
- Next: 1990 World Championships

The 1989 World Figure Skating Championships was held March 14–19 at the Palais Omnisports de Paris-Bercy in Paris. Medals were awarded in men's singles, ladies' singles, pair skating, and ice dancing.

== Medal tables ==
=== Medalists ===
Discipline	Gold	Silver	Bronze
Men	(Canada) Kurt Browning	(United States) Christopher Bowman	(Poland) Grzegorz Filipowski
Ladies	(Japan) Midori Ito	(West Germany) Claudia Leistner	(United States) Jill Trenary
Pair skating	(Soviet Union) Ekaterina Gordeeva / Sergei Grinkov	(Canada) Cindy Landry / Lyndon Johnston	(Soviet Union) Elena Bechke / Denis Petrov
Ice dancing	(Soviet Union) Marina Klimova / Sergei Ponomarenko	(Soviet Union) Maya Usova / Aleksandr Zhulin	(France) Isabelle Duchesnay / Paul Duchesnay

=== Medals by country ===
Rank	Nation	Gold	Silver	Bronze	Total
1	Soviet Union (URS)	2	1	1	4
2	Canada (CAN)	1	1	0	2
3	Japan (JPN)	1	0	0	1
4	United States (USA)	0	1	1	2
5	West Germany (FRG)	0	1	0	1
6	France (FRA)	0	0	1	1
6	Poland (POL)	0	0	1	1
Totals (7 entries)		4	4	4	12

== Results ==
=== Men ===
Kurt Browning became the first man to win a world championship while completing a quadruple jump.

Rank	Name	Nation	TFP	CF	OP	FS
1	Kurt Browning	Canada	3.6	5	1	1
2	Christopher Bowman	United States	5.8	4	2	3
3	Grzegorz Filipowski	Poland	6.2	3	5	2
4	Alexander Fadeev	Soviet Union	6.2	1	3	4
5	Petr Barna	Czechoslovakia	10.2	7	4	5
6	Viktor Petrenko	Soviet Union	10.4	2	6	6
7	Daniel Doran	United States	16.0	6	11	7
8	Oliver Höner	Switzerland	18.0	10	10	8
9	Michael Slipchuk	Canada	19.4	13	7	10
10	Cameron Medhurst	Australia	20.8	11	9	11
11	Makoto Kano	Japan	21.0	18	8	9
12	Daniel Weiss	West Germany	25.2	9	16	12
13	Axel Médéric	France	26.0	12	12	14
14	Dmitri Gromov	Soviet Union	27.6	14	15	13
15	András Száraz	Hungary	31.8	15	13	18
16	Mirko Eichhorn	East Germany	33.2	20	17	15
17	Ralph Burghart	Austria	34.6	8	19	20
18	Alessandro Riccitelli	Italy	34.8	17	20	16
19	Peter Johansson	Sweden	35.0	19	14	19
20	Henrik Walentin	Denmark	37.0	23	18	17
Free skating not reached
21	Christian Newberry	United Kingdom		16	25	
22	Jung Sung-il	South Korea		22	21	
23	Iwo Svec	West Germany		21	23	
24	Oula Jääskeläinen	Finland		25	22	
25	David Liu	Chinese Taipei		26	24	
26	Boyko Aleksiev	Bulgaria		24	26	
27	Alexandre Geers	Belgium		27	27	
WD	Ricardo Olavarrieta	Mexico	DNF	28		

=== Ladies ===
Midori Ito was the first Japanese skater to win gold and the first woman to do a triple axel in a major ISU competition.

Rank	Name	Nation	TFP	CF	OP	FS
1	Midori Ito	Japan	4.0	6	1	1
2	Claudia Leistner	West Germany	4.2	1	3	2
3	Jill Trenary	United States	5.0	2	2	3
4	Patricia Neske	West Germany	11.6	5	6	6
5	Natalia Lebedeva	Soviet Union	11.6	3	4	8
6	Kristi Yamaguchi	United States	11.8	12	5	4
7	Evelyn Großmann	East Germany	16.6	14	10	5
8	Natalia Gorbenko	Soviet Union	17.4	4	8	11
9	Beatrice Gelmini	Italy	18.6	11	7	10
10	Surya Bonaly	France	18.8	16	9	7
11	Karen Preston	Canada	22.4	17	11	9
12	Simone Lang	East Germany	23.8	10	13	12
13	Yvonne Pokorny	Austria	27.0	9	14	15
14	Tamara Téglássy	Hungary	28.8	13	16	14
15	Junko Yaginuma	Japan	29.2	15	12	16
16	Charlene Wong	Canada	29.2	8	15	17
17	Željka Čižmešija	Yugoslavia	34.2	7	19	20
18	Yvonne Gómez	Spain	34.6	24	20	13
19	Helene Persson	Sweden	37.2	21	18	18
20	Petra Vonmoos	Switzerland	38.0	22	17	19
Free skating not reached
21	Tracy Brook	Australia		23	21	
22	Lily Lyoonjung Lee	South Korea		20	25	
23	Louisa Danskin	United Kingdom		19	27	
24	Anisette Torp-Lind	Denmark		27	22	
25	Jacqueline Soames	United Kingdom		26	23	
26	Mari Niskanen	Finland		25	24	
27	Tsvetelina Yankova	Bulgaria		30	26	
28	Diana Marcos	Mexico		28	28	
29	Charuda Upatham	Thailand		29	29	
WD	Sandy Suy	Belgium	DNF	18		

=== Pairs ===
Rank	Name	Nation	TFP	SP	FS
1	Ekaterina Gordeeva / Sergei Grinkov	Soviet Union	1.5	1	1
2	Cindy Landry / Lyndon Johnston	Canada	3.0	2	2
3	Elena Bechke / Denis Petrov	Soviet Union	5.0	4	3
4	Peggy Schwarz / Alexander König	East Germany	6.5	3	5
5	Kristi Yamaguchi / Rudy Galindo	United States	7.0	6	4
6	Elena Kvitchenko / Rashid Kadyrkaev	Soviet Union	9.5	5	7
7	Isabelle Brasseur / Lloyd Eisler	Canada	10.0	8	6
8	Natalie Seybold / Wayne Seybold	United States	11.0	6	8
9	Anuschka Gläser / Stefan Pfrengle	West Germany	13.5	9	9
10	Danielle Carr / Stephen Carr	Australia	15.0	10	10
11	Cheryl Peake / Andrew Naylor	United Kingdom	16.5	11	11

=== Ice dancing ===
Rank	Name	Nation	TFP	CD	OSP	FD
1	Marina Klimova / Sergei Ponomarenko	Soviet Union	2.0	1	1	1
2	Maya Usova / Alexander Zhulin	Soviet Union	4.0	2	2	2
3	Isabelle Duchesnay / Paul Duchesnay	France	7.2	3	5	3
4	Klára Engi / Attila Tóth	Hungary	7.4	4	3	4
5	Susie Wynne / Joseph Druar	United States	9.4	5	4	5
6	Larisa Fedorinova / Evgeni Platov	Soviet Union	12.0	6	6	6
7	Stefania Calegari / Pasquale Camerlengo	Italy	14.0	7	7	7
8	Karyn Garossino / Rod Garossino	Canada	16.0	8	8	8
9	Sharon Jones / Paul Askham	United Kingdom	18.0	9	9	9
10	Andrea Juklova / Martin Šimeček	Czechoslovakia	20.4	11	10	10
11	Michelle McDonald / Mark Mitchell	Canada	22.8	13	11	11
12	Dominique Yvon / Frédéric Palluel	France	24.0	12	12	12
13	Susanna Rahkamo / Petri Kokko	Finland	26.8	15	13	13
14	Andrea Weppelmann / Hendryk Schamberger	West Germany	28.0	14	14	14
15	Anna Croci / Luca Mantovani	Italy	30.8	17	15	15
16	Małgorzata Grajcar / Andrzej Dostatni	Poland	32.0	16	16	16
17	Krisztina Kerekes / Csaba Szentpéteri	Hungary	34.4	18	17	17
18	Diane Gerencser / Alexander Stanislavov	Switzerland	36.4	19	19	19
19	Kaoru Takino / Kenji Takino	Japan	38.4	20	19	19
Free dance not reached
20	Monica MacDonald / Duncan Smart	Australia		22	21	
21	Ursula Holik / Herbert Holik	Austria		23	22	
22	Park Kyung-sook / Han Seung-jong	South Korea		24	23	
23	Petya Gavazova / Nikolai Tonev	Bulgaria		25	24	
WD	April Sargent / Russ Witherby	United States	DNF	10		
