= Cindy Landry =

Canadian pair skater

Personal information
- Born: 9 February 1972 (age 54)
- Height: 5 ft 2 in (157 cm)

Figure skating career
- Country: Canada
- Partner: Lyndon Johnston; Sylvain Lalonde
- Skating club: CPA Vaudreuil
- Retired: 1990
Medal record
Representing Canada
Figure skating: Pairs
World Championships
Silver medal – second place	1989 Paris	Pairs

Cindy Landry-Davis, née Landry, (born 9 February 1972) is a Canadian former pair skater. With Lyndon Johnston, she is the 1989 World silver medallist and 1990 Canadian national champion. After placing 9th at the 1990 World Championships, they both turned professional, and Landry skated in professional competitions as well as shows in Las Vegas in the 1990s.

== Career ==
Landry began skating in her backyard at age 3.

Earlier in her career, Landry skated with Sylvain Lalonde on the novice and junior levels. They were the 1985 novice Canadian National Championships champions and the 1988 junior champions.

Landry joined up with Johnston in June 1988 after his previous partner, Denise Benning, decided to retire from competition to continue her education. Johnston, looking for a new partner, watched video of the previous Canadian Championships and decided to ask Landry if she would partner with him.

Landry and her family initially hesitated over both Landry's existing partnership with Lalonde and the fact that Johnston asked her to move to Kitchener, Ontario to train. The pair worked well together during a tryout, and Landry decided she would have a better future career with Johnston. She said the split with Lalonde was "difficult", and they did not remain friends. Landry and Johnston had a ten-year age gap; Landry said she thought his greater experience was a "big boost" for her skating.

In their first season together, they were sent to compete at the Coupe des Alpes as well as the Nebelhorn Trophy; they won both events. During a practice session at the Nebelhorn Trophy, Landry fell onto Johnston's face, breaking a tooth and causing his face to swell. At the Canadian Championships in February 1989, they won the short program, but fell twice in their free skate to finish in second overall. With their placement, they were given a berth on the World Championships team.

In March, they competed at the World Championships. They finished the short program in an unexpectedly high position, second behind Olympic champions Ekaterina Gordeeva and Sergei Grinkov. They finished second in the free skate as well to win the silver medal. Landry said, "I'm glad I did it for my country and for myself." Afterward, the pair toured shows in Europe, North America, and Australia.

In the 1989–1990 season, they were assigned Skate Canada International. There, they won the short program, but fell to second after the free skate to win the silver medal. In December, they took the unusual step of taking three weeks off due to personal disagreements and conflict in training. Johnston considered retiring, but the pair returned for the Canadian Championships in February 1990. On Landry's 18th birthday, the pair won the Canadian title.

At the 1990 World Championships, the pair had a poor short program, where Johnston caught his skate in a damaged area of the ice and struggled with a lift and spin. They finished that segment in 10th place. After the free skate, they rose to 9th.

In May, Johnston announced he had turned professional, and Landry also turned to professional skating.

== Post-competitive career ==
Landry skated in professional competitions with Peter Oppegard. She later skated in the "Enter the Night" Las Vegas ice show with Burt Lancon from 1993 until its closure in 1999. Afterward, she performed with Jered Guzman.

== Personal life ==
Landry was engaged to Christopher Bowman in 1991. By 1999, she had changed her surname to Landry-Davis.

Landry and Johnston were inducted into the Cambridge Sports Hall of Fame in 2010.

== Results ==
=== With Lalonde ===
National
Event	1984–85	1987–88
Canadian Championships	3rd N	1st J
Levels: N = Novice; J = Junior

=== With Johnston ===
International
Event	1988–89	1989–90
World Championships	2nd	9th
Nebelhorn Trophy	1st	
Skate Canada International		2nd
St. Gervais International	1st	
National
Canadian Championships	2nd	1st
