= Regina Woodward =

Hungarian ice dancer (born 1970)

Personal information
- Born: 18 September 1970 (age 55) Sunrise, Florida, U.S.
- Height: 174 cm (5 ft 9 in)

Figure skating career
- Country: Hungary
- Discipline: Ice dance

Regina Barr, née Woodward, (born 18 September 1970) is an American-born Hungarian retired ice dancer. With her partner, Csaba Szentpétery, she competed in the ice dance event at the 1992 Winter Olympics. They were the first mixed-citizenship team to compete where one member was not a defector awaiting citizenship in a new country. She now works as a coach.

== Career ==
=== Early career ===
Woodward began skating at age 9 after receiving free passes to a rink within walking distance of her home. She and her brother trained there, as their mother had multiple sclerosis and wanted them to participate in an activity that did not require her to drive them.

At age 12, she moved to Philadelphia to train. She began ice dance at age 16. She switched due to struggling with jumps and having injured herself several times; she required surgery on her left knee. Woodward's family had an extensive background in music, with multiple family members playing in concerts or bands, which helped her adapt to ice dance.

She paired up with James Curtis as a junior, training at the University of Delaware Figure Skating Club, then competed with Charles Sinek in 1989.

=== Partnership with Woodward ===
Woodward joined up with Csaba Szentpétery, a Hungarian ice dancer, after Regőczy invited her to try out with him. The two met up at a training camp in Europe. They decided to compete for Hungary as US officials "were not enthusiastic" about the team being of mixed nationalities, and because their coach was better-connected in Hungary. They described their partnership as being a mix of the more precise European style and the more athletic American style of ice dance. Woodward worked part-time while they competed.

Woodward's nickname in Hungary was húsvéti nyuszi, or "easter bunny" after she said it when asked on Hungarian television if she knew any Hungarian. Her mother had sent her one, and she asked Szentpétery how to say it in Hungarian.

The Hungarian federation made a rule change to allow them to compete at the Hungarian Championships in 1990 without Woodward yet having citizenship. The pair placed second. Woodward applied for Hungarian citizenship, and the team were unsure if they would be able to compete at the 1990 World Championships until two weeks before. At the competition, they represented the International Skating Union (ISU) rather than a country. The ISU changed its rules to allow mixed-citizenship representation and approved their partnership; previously this had only occurred in the cases of defectors who had not yet received citizenship in the country they fled to.

The next season, the pair competed at the 1990 Skate America. Skating magazine, in its review of the competition, praised their free dance for being "unique"; it portrayed a couple's wedding day. They placed 14th at the 1991 European Championships.

In January 1992, shortly before the Hungarian Championships, Szentpétery dropped Woodward in training. She continued to train despite having torn cartilage and a fracture in her kneecap, saying, "I had never had an injury that had kept me off the ice. My attitude was if you ignore it, it will go away. Plus I didn't have much of an option. What was I going to do, not go to the Olympics because my knee hurt?" She also said that Szentpétery showed great concern for her. They placed 13th at the 1992 European Championships.

At the Olympics, the pair finished in 14th place. Afterward, they were 14th at the 1992 World Championships.

Following the Olympics, Woodward had knee surgery. The pair moved to Pennsauken Township, New Jersey, and Woodward returned to skating in October 1992. Due to her injury, they reduced how much they trained. They won the Hungarian Championships and placed 18th at the 1993 World Championships.

The pair announced their retirement from competition in October 1993. Woodward said, "We just thought it was time," and that she was happy with her decision despite the fact that it meant she would miss attempting to compete at the 1994 Winter Olympics.

Woodward now works as a coach at the Philadelphia Skating Club.
