= Csaba Szentpétery =

Hungarian ice dancer (born 1968)

Personal information
- Born: 28 July 1968 (age 57) Budapest, Hungary

Figure skating career
- Country: Hungary
- Discipline: Ice dance

Csaba Szentpétery (born 28 July 1968) is a Hungarian retired ice dancer. With his partner, Regina Woodward, he competed in the ice dance event at the 1992 Winter Olympics. They were the first mixed-citizenship team to compete where one member was not a defector awaiting citizenship in a new country. He now works in banking.

== Career ==
=== Early career ===
Szentpétery was born in Budapest and began skating at age 6 because his day care center taught ice skating; at the time, Hungary only had one covered ice rink. He initially trained in single skating, but jumping caused painful developmental problems in his foot, and in 1982, at age 13, he was told to take two years away from skating to allow for healing. Instead, his coach suggested he began ice dance, which because of its lack of jumps and lower lifts than those found in pair skating, would put less pressure on his foot.

He switched coaches to Krisztina Regőczy to learn ice dance, which he described as "humbling" after having been the Hungarian champion in men's singles skating for his age group. After Regőczy was invited to coach in Boston, he and his partner, Krisztina Kerekes, moved to the United States with her.

With Kerekes, he placed 12th at the 1986 World Junior Championships, 8th at the 1987 World Junior Championships, 21st at the 1988 World Championships, 15th at the 1989 European Championships, and 17th at the 1989 World Championships. In 1989, she had problems with her knees and returned to Hungary. Szentpétery struggled to find a new partner, and in summer 1989, he auditioned and was accepted for an ice show as a group member, which he called "demeaning". However, shortly before he was to sign the contract, Regőczy found him a new partner. Before they could skate together, however, the family called to say her father had died, and they were not sure if they could afford training.

=== Partnership with Woodward ===
Szentpétery joined up with Regina Woodward, an American citizen, after Regőczy invited her to try out with Szentpétery. The two met up at a training camp in Europe. They decided to compete for Hungary as US officials "were not enthusiastic" about the team being of mixed nationalities, and because their coach was better-connected in Hungary. They described their partnership as being a mix of the more precise European style and the more athletic American style of ice dance.

The Hungarian federation made a rule change to allow them to compete at the Hungarian Championships in 1990 without Woodward yet having citizenship. The pair placed second. Woodward applied for Hungarian citizenship, and the team were unsure if they would be able to compete at the 1990 World Championships until two weeks before. At the competition, they represented the International Skating Union (ISU) rather than a country. The ISU changed its rules to allow mixed-citizenship representation and approved their partnership; previously this had only occurred in the cases of defectors who had not yet received citizenship in the country they fled to.

The next season, the pair competed at the 1990 Skate America. Skating magazine, in its review of the competition, praised their free dance for being "unique"; it portrayed a couple's wedding day. They placed 14th at the 1991 European Championships.

In January 1992, shortly before the Hungarian Championships, Szentpétery dropped Woodward in training. She continued to train despite having torn cartilage and a fracture in her kneecap, and she said Szentpétery expressed great concern for her. They placed 13th at the 1992 European Championships.

The night before the pair were to leave for the 1992 Winter Olympics, Szentpétery's skates were stolen from his car. He found an older pair, several sizes smaller, in his attic, with which he competed. The pair finished in 14th place. Afterward, they were 14th at the 1992 World Championships.

Following the Olympics, Woodward had knee surgery. The pair moved to Pennsauken Township, New Jersey, and Woodward returned to skating in October 1992. They won the Hungarian Championships and placed 18th at the 1993 World Championships.

The pair announced their retirement from competition in October 1993.

== Post-competitive career ==
Szentpétery became a judge. He began working in banking and is now the deputy CEO of Budapest Bank.
