= Paul Duchesnay =

French ice dancer (born 1961)

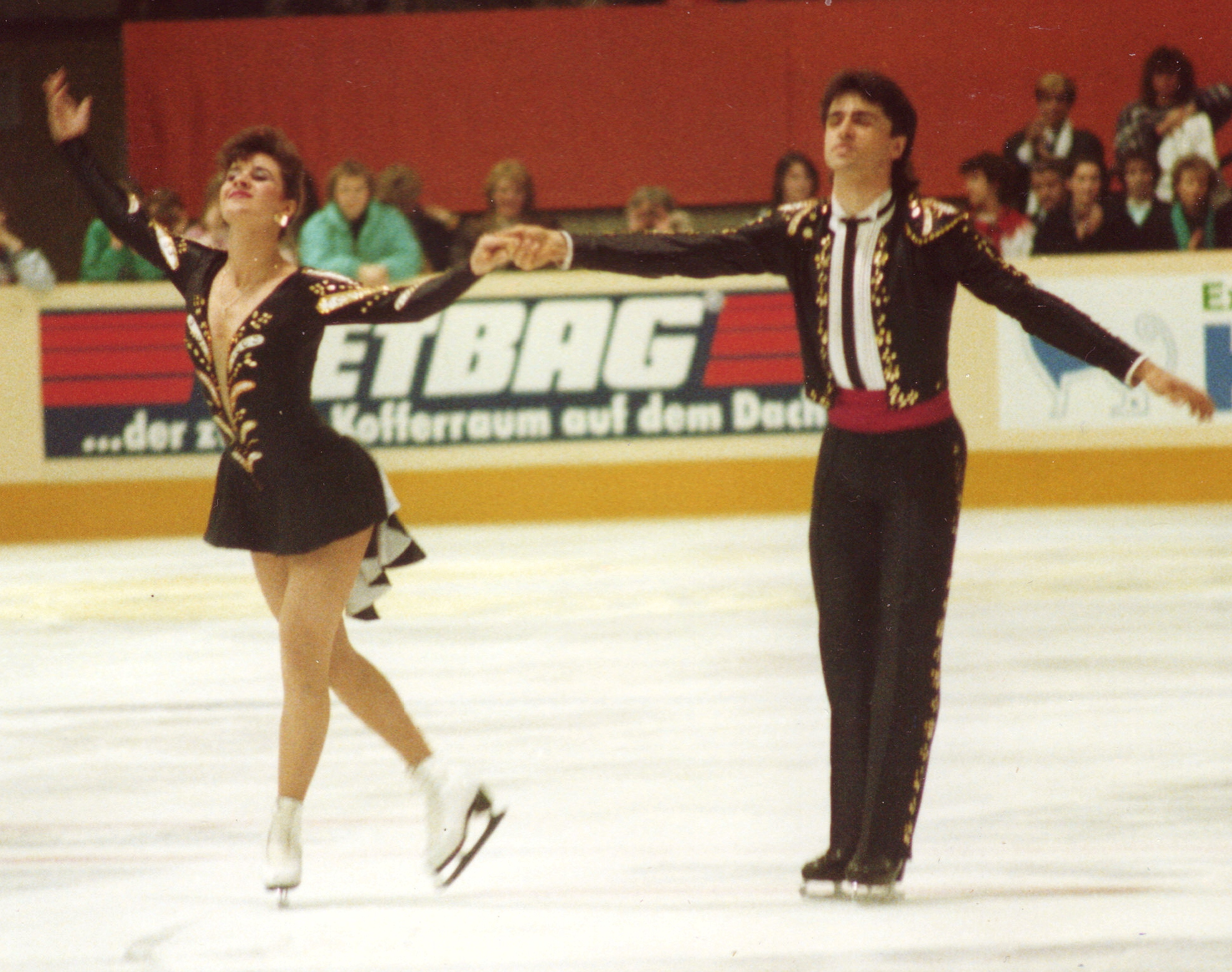
- The Duchesnays at an Exhibition in Berlin in 1989

Personal information
- Born: 31 July 1961 (age 64) Metz, France
- Height: 5 ft 8.5 in (1.74 m)

Figure skating career
- Country: France
- Retired: 1996
Medal record
Figure skating
Ice dancing
Representing France
Olympic Games
Silver medal – second place	1992 Albertville	Ice dancing
World Championships
Gold medal – first place	1991 Munich	Ice dancing
Silver medal – second place	1990 Halifax	Ice dancing
Bronze medal – third place	1989 Paris	Ice dancing
European Championships
Silver medal – second place	1991 Sofia	Ice dancing
Bronze medal – third place	1990 Leningrad	Ice dancing
Bronze medal – third place	1988 Prague	Ice dancing

Paul Duchesnay (born 31 July 1961) is a retired ice dancer who represented France for most of his career. With his sister Isabelle Duchesnay, he is the 1991 World champion and the 1992 Olympic silver medalist.

== Career ==
The Duchesnays started skating at an early age in Canada in pairs. Their first major success came at the 1982 Canadian Nationals, where they placed second in the junior competition. After a serious accident where Isabelle hit her head, they switched to ice dancing. Over time, the Duchesnays’ skating became more innovative and revolutionary with help from 1984 Olympic champion Christopher Dean. After Skate Canada criticized their skating, they decided to leave the Canadian team. Writer Ellyn Kestnbaum states, about Dean's choreography of the Duchesnays' programs: "Once Dean began to choreograph their programs in 1988, they introduced a whole new range of meanings to the issue of a man and woman skating together on the ice". In 1985, they began skating for their mother's homeland, France. They were coached by Martin Skotnicky, based out of Oberstdorf, Germany. They also switched teams because they felt they were not progressing as quickly as they thought they should in Canada.

The Duchesnays’ 1988 Winter Olympics programs were considered unusual. Their free dance, a jungle-inspired dance set to drums, was not well received by judges and they finished eighth overall. Kestnbaum states that although the Duchesnays were not expected to win a gold medal at the Olympics so early in their career, their "novelty and the originality of their style made an impression". It was reported that the spectators in Calgary enjoyed the free skating program, which was described as a "comedic, melodramatic tango", as well as "percussive" and "tribal", the judges' disparate scores, however, demonstrated that they did not know what to make of the program. Despite the judges’ reactions, the Duchesnays continued skating in their unusual and innovative style. They placed third and second in the 1989 and 1990 World Championships, respectively.

The Duchesnays came in second place at the 1991 European Championships in Sofia, Bulgaria. Kestnbam calls their free dance program "controversial". They both wore blue-violet trousers and shirts; Isabelle Duchesnay wore her hair french-braided against her head, which emulated Paul Duchesnay's shorter curls. The choreography was focused on the theme of mirror images. As Kestnbaum states, "It was not always possible to distinguish which skater was Paul and which was Isabelle". Kestnbaum goes on to state, "All markers of difference seem to have been suppressed in service of the mirror image theme; the skaters' bodies are gendered as neutral". Additionally, the Duchesnays' choice of trousers for both skaters pushed the gender neutrality depicted in the program towards maleness because female skaters did not typically wear trousers; Kestnbaum stated that it depicted Isabelle Duchesnay as "cross-dressed on the ice", which Kestnbaum called an "instant of transvestitism" that "profoundly disturbed the skating world, so accustomed to perceiving male/female differences as a given". Their program did not go well with the judges; according to Christopher Dean, who choreographed the program, they were told that they had no hope of winning the Worlds Championships with it because it was too contemporary and avant-garde. According to Kestnbaum, the Duchesnays' experimentation influenced other ice dancers, which resisted the ballroom origins of ice dancing. The gender dynamics in their programs, due to their status as siblings, also resisted the "traditional clichés" of the sport.

The Duchesnays won their only World title at the 1991 Worlds in Munich, Germany. Determined to win the gold medal, they came to Munich with a new free dance program, entitled "Missing II," a sequel to their previous season's free dance, about the disappeared victims of Latin American dictatorships. As in 1990, Isabelle Duchesnay wore a tattered knee-length dress and a red leotard, while Paul Duchesnay wore dark trousers, a blue striped shirt with torn-up sleeves, and a red tie. Kestnbaum reports that although the partners wore costumes traditionally ascribed to their respective genders, "the choreography avoids narrativizing gender binarism". Kestnbaum also states that the fast section of their free dance, which occurred at the end of the program, "becomes a symbolic victory over oppression and an actual victory for the Duchesnays".

As the reigning world champions, Duchesnays were favoured to win gold at the 1992 Winter Olympics in Albertville, France, in their home country. They won the silver medal behind Marina Klimova and Sergei Ponomarenko. Their free skate was set to music from West Side Story; they portrayed the characters Maria and Bernardo, brother and sister in the musical. As Kestnbaum states, "the Duchesnays erase sexual difference by making the girl one of the boys. Again masculinity is valorized as normative, but it is not the exclusive property of biological males".

The Duchesnays then retired from amateur competition and competed professionally until Paul suffered a serious rollerblading accident in 1996. In 1996, the Duchesnays were nominated for a Gemini Award in Best Performance - Performing Arts Program or Series for their performance in “The Planets”. Paul Duchesnay is now a coach in the United States.

== Personal life ==
Duchesnay was born to a French mother and Canadian father. He was born in France but his family moved to Aylmer, Quebec, in 1962. He also had an elder brother, Gaston, who died in 1991.

== Results ==
(ice dance with Isabelle Duchesnay)

International
Event	1981–82	1982–83	1983–84	1984–85	1985–86	1986–87	1987–88	1988–89	1989–90	1990–91	1991–92
Olympics							8th				2nd
Worlds					12th	9th	6th	3rd	2nd	1st	
Europeans					8th	5th	3rd		3rd	2nd	
Skate America						1st					
Nebelhorn		2nd									
National
French					1st	1st			1st	1st	
Canadian	2nd J	4th	4th	3rd							
J = Junior

== Amateur career programs ==
Season	Original Set Pattern Dance	Free Dance	Exhibition
1991-1992	Polka - The Lonely Goatherd from The Sound of Music Soundtrack Choreographed by Christopher Dean	West Side Story soundtrack by Leonard Bernstein Choreographed by Christopher Dean	
1990-1991	Blues - from A Streetcar Named Desire Soundtrack Choreographed by Christopher Dean	Missing II - Atahualpa and Cacharpaya by Inti Illmani Choreographed by Christopher Dean; Reflections - Ocean Waves by George Winston Choreographed by Christopher Dean	Tango; Blues
1989-1990	Samba - Instrumental version of Late in the Evening by Paul Simon Choreographed by Christopher Dean	Missing I - Dolencias and Sikuriades by Inti Illimani Choreographed by Christopher Dean	Malaguena by Ernesto Lecuona; Missing I - Dolencias and Sikuriades by Inti Illimani Choreographed by Christopher Dean
1988-1989	Charleston - Josephine Baker Choreographed by Christopher Dean	Instrumental version of Eleanor Rigby by The Beatles Choreographed by Christopher Dean	
1987-1988	Argentine tango Choreographed by Christopher Dean	Savage Rites using War Dance by Mandingo Choreographed by Christopher Dean	
1986-1987	Waltz - The Skater's Waltz Op.183 by Emile Waldteufel	Malaguena by Ernesto Lecuona	Paso Doble/Flamenco

== Works cited ==
- Kestnbaum, Ellyn (2003). Culture on Ice: Figure Skating and Cultural Meaning. Middleton, Connecticut: Wesleyan Publishing Press.
