= Midori Ito =

Japanese figure skater (born 1969)

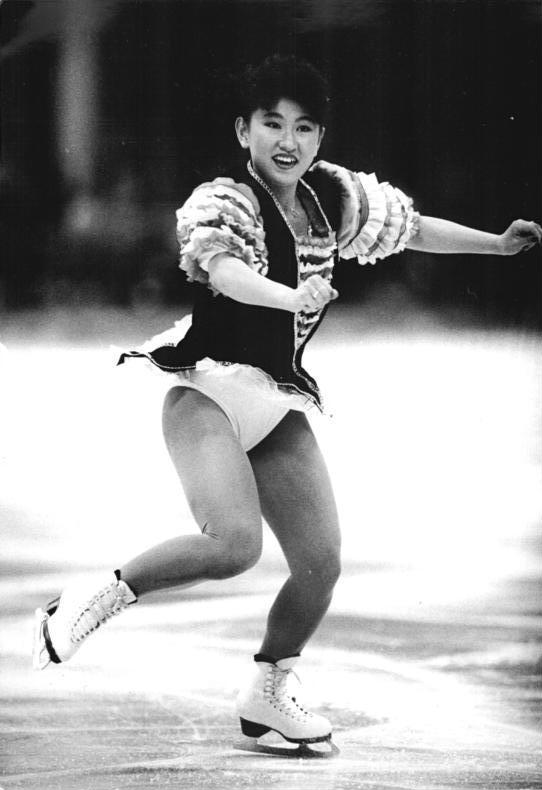
- Ito in 1989

Personal information
- Born: 13 August 1969 (age 56) Nagoya, Aichi, Japan
- Height: 1.45 m (4 ft 9 in)

Figure skating career
- Country: Japan
- Retired: 1992
Medal record
Figure skating: Ladies' singles
Representing Japan
Winter Olympics
Silver medal – second place	1992 Albertville	Ladies' singles
World Championships
Gold medal – first place	1989 Paris	Ladies' singles
Silver medal – second place	1990 Halifax	Ladies' singles
Japan Championships
Gold medal – first place	1985 Tokyo	Ladies' singles
Gold medal – first place	1986 Tokyo	Ladies' singles
Gold medal – first place	1987 Tokyo	Ladies' singles
Gold medal – first place	1988 Tokyo	Ladies' singles
Gold medal – first place	1989 Tokyo	Ladies' singles
Gold medal – first place	1990 Fukuoka	Ladies' singles
Gold medal – first place	1991 Yokohama	Ladies' singles
Gold medal – first place	1992 Kobe	Ladies' singles
Gold medal – first place	1996 Yokohama	Ladies' singles
Silver medal – second place	1984 Tokyo	Ladies' singles
Bronze medal – third place	1981 Tokyo	Ladies' singles
World Junior Championships
Bronze medal – third place	1984 Sapporo	Ladies' singles

Midori Ito

Japanese name
- Kanji: 伊藤みどり
- Kana: いとう みどり
Transcriptions
- Romanization: Itō Midori

Midori Ito (伊藤みどり, Itō Midori; born 13 August 1969) is a Japanese retired figure skater. She is the 1989 World champion and the 1992 Olympic silver medalist. She is the first woman to land a triple Axel in competition. At the 1988 Calgary Olympics, she became the first woman to land seven triple jumps in an Olympic free skating competition. She is widely recognised as one of the best figure skaters of all time.

== Career ==
Ito started skating at age four at a rink in Nagoya and approached Machiko Yamada, who would become her coach throughout her career, on the same day. She landed her first triple jump at age 8. She went to live with her coach after her parents' divorce when she was 10.

Ito made her first appearance at a major international competition at the 1981 World Junior Championships. She placed 20th in the compulsory figures but won the free skating with a triple loop, a triple salchow, and two triple toe loop combinations. She finished 8th in the overall standings. At this event, the 11-year-old Ito was only 3'11" tall and weighed 53 pounds. She was nicknamed the "Jumping Flea" due to her diminutive size and powerful jumps.

At the 1982 World Junior Championships, Ito won both the short program and free skating, but again weak compulsory figures kept her off the podium, in 6th place overall. Her free skating at this event included a triple flip and a triple toe loop-triple toe loop combination, and she landed a triple Lutz in the exhibition.

Ito did not compete at the 1983 World Junior event, which took place in December 1982, having broken her ankle earlier that year. In the fall of 1983, she made her senior international debut at the Ennia Challenge Cup in the Netherlands, a competition that featured the short program and free skating only, without compulsory figures. She finished second to Katarina Witt, who went on to win the Olympic title a few months later. Ito's free skating included six triple jumps—flip, Lutz, loop, Salchow, and two toe loops—and she also completed a double loop-triple loop combination in the short program. At the 1984 World Junior Championships, she won both the short program and free skating but finished third overall due to a low placement in the compulsory figures. Ito also competed at the 1984 World Championships, where she finished 7th.

Ito won her first national championship in the 1985 season, but was unable to compete at that year's World Championships after again breaking her ankle. From that time on, she increased the number of triple jumps she would attempt in the free skating. From 1985 to 1987, Ito's free skating included seven triple jumps, but she would not always perform them cleanly. She would attempt a triple toe loop-triple toe loop combination, a Lutz jump, a flip jump, a loop jump, a Salchow jump in combination and another solo Salchow jump.

Ito placed 5th at the 1988 Winter Olympics in Calgary, Alberta, Canada. In Calgary, she performed a double loop-triple loop in the short program, and seven triples in the free skating: Lutz, flip, double Axel-half loop-triple Salchow combination, loop, triple toe loop-triple toe loop combination, and another Salchow. She received the best technical scores given, two 5.8 and seven 5.9 marks, despite skating before the final flight. Her successful seven triple jumps were two more than any of the other skaters even attempted. Figure skating writer and historian Ellyn Kestnbaum speculates that Ito's low marks in compulsory figures took her out of contention for a medal, which might have influenced the judges to award her lower scores in her short and free skating programs. Kestnbaum also states that her technically difficult free skate would have held up well against the most difficult programs performed by female single skaters ten years later, and that as of 2003, "the quality of her jumps (apart from the less-preferred high wrapped position of her free leg while in the air) has never been equaled". Ito's presentation marks also suffered, despite her "high energy and pleasing cheerfulness", due to her tendency to keep her back and shoulders stiff, which resulted in a lack of fluidity and sublety in her musical expressiveness.

Later that same year, she perfected the triple Axel, which she had been working on since her early teens, and landed it at a regional competition in the Aichi Prefecture. She became the first woman to land it in international competition at the 1988 NHK Trophy. She then repeated the feat at the World Championships in 1989. Ito thus became the first woman to execute all six possible triple jumps in World competition: Axel, Lutz, flip, loop, Salchow, and toe loop. She was 6th in the compulsory figures but made up for it. She won the gold medal with a flawless free skating when she received 6.0s for technical merit from five of the nine judges, receiving 5.9s from the rest. Her win at the 1989 World Championships was the first world title in the sport for an Asian competitor.

During the start of the 1989–90 season, Ito made history again at the 1989 NHK Trophy competition, where she received a rare 6.0 technical/6.0 artistic score from the Hungarian judge, and again landed seven triples, including the triple Axel. At the 1990 World Championships, Ito was 10th after the compulsory figures but placed first in both the short program and the free skating and won the silver medal, second to Jill Trenary. She landed seven triple jumps in the free skating, including the triple Axel. Compulsory figures were eliminated from competitions following that season. Ito commented: "In training, I spend about two-thirds of my time on the figures. So I will sort of miss them as part of my life. But I will not miss them in the actual event." In June 1990, she was invited to meet Emperor Akihito.

Ito had chronically sore knees due to her jumps. In February 1991, she underwent surgery to remove two glandular cysts in her throat and was in the hospital for 18 days. In March, at the 1991 World Championships, Ito collided with France's Laetitia Hubert during a practice session – her hip and the top of her foot were bruised. In the short program, she placed her jump combination too close to the corner of the rink and fell into the opening in the boards for the television camera but was back on the ice within seconds. She finished 4th at the event.

At the 1991 Grand Prix International de Paris – a pre-Olympic event in Albertville – Ito beat Kristi Yamaguchi by completing a triple Axel and five other triple jumps in her free skating. During the warm-up before the free skating, she landed a triple Axel-triple toe loop jump combination.

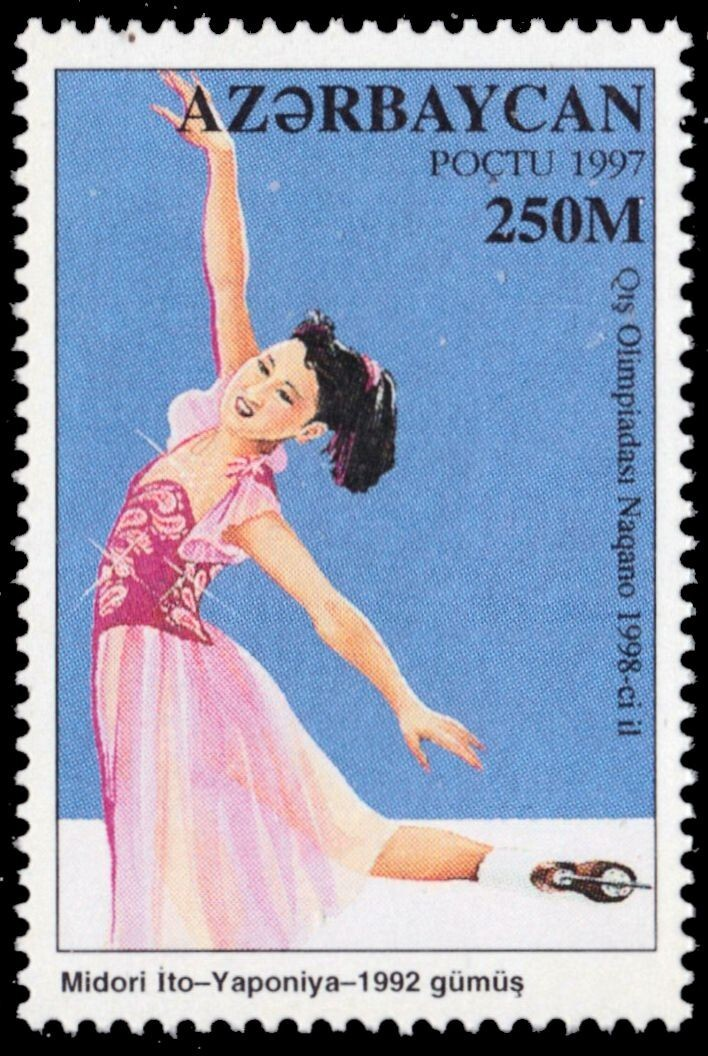
Ito on an Azerbaijani postage stamp

The 1992 Winter Olympics did not include the compulsory figures which caused Ito to lose the World championships the year before even after winning the short program and free skating competitions. With only the short program and the free skating to perform, she became the heiress apparent to Katarina Witt. She planned to perform the triple Axel combined with a double toe loop for the jump combination requirement in the short program but changed it to a triple Lutz combination. Ito placed fourth in the short program when she fell on her triple Lutz jump. In comparison, Kristi Yamaguchi and Nancy Kerrigan completed their triple Lutz-double toe loop combinations and then placed one and two, respectively. The change may have an interesting origin. During a practice session, Surya Bonaly of France performed a backflip near her. Ito was nearly hit on the head and was obviously shaken. Subsequently, her practice with her triple Axel jumps turned out poorly, which may have led her to take it out of the original program. Ito's free skating began with a failed triple Axel but she attempted it again at the end of her program and landed it successfully, becoming the first woman to land one in the Olympics. She won the silver medal, and apologized to her country for not winning the gold. Ito turned professional afterwards, bringing the triple Axel for the first time to the professional ranks, and performed with ice shows in Japan. She briefly returned to competitive skating in the 1995–96 season, but without her former success.

During the peak of her career, Ito performed much the same jump content as the top male skaters of the time. She was the first ladies' skater to perform a triple-triple jump combination and the first to perform the triple Axel. In March 1990, Jill Trenary said, "I was in awe of how high she jumps." In 1990, Scott Hamilton said "it will be 50 years before we see anything like Midori Ito again," and Toller Cranston, the same year, noted that "she is beyond 6.0." Her mastery of triple jumps, including the triple axel, was the start of "a new era in women's skating", before several triple jumps, usually of five different types, became the norm in championship free skating programs.

Ito lit the Olympic Cauldron during the opening ceremonies of the 1998 Winter Olympics, appearing dressed as the physical representation of the Japanese sun goddess Amaterasu.

Ito returned to competitive figure skating in 2011. She competed at the ISU Adult Figure Skating Competition and placed second in her category, Ladies' Masters Elite II. Ito repeated her second-place finish the following year. In 2013, on her third year competing at the ISU Adult Figure Skating Championship, she took the title with a 12 points margin over the second place. In 2024, Ito won the ISU Adult Figure Skating Competition's Masters Elite Women III + IV Artistic Free Skating category.

== Programs ==
=== Post–2010 ===
Season	Free skating
2012–2013	The theme for the TV series Atsuhime by Ryo Yoshimata
2010–2011	Whisper of the River by Nobuyuki Tsujii

=== Pre-1996 ===
Season	Short program	Free skating	Exhibition
1995–96	The Firebird by Igor Stravinsky	Cinderella by Sergei Prokofiev	Nessun dorma by Giacomo Puccini
1991–92	Tango Jalousie by Jacob Gade; España cañí by Pascual Marquina Narro	Piano Concerto No. 1 by Sergei Rachmaninoff; Piano Concerto No. 1; Piano Concerto No. 2 by Sergei Rachmaninoff	Rhythm of the Rain by The Cascades; Singin' in the Rain by Nacio Herb Brown; Over the Rainbow by Harold Arlen; On My Own by Claude-Michel Schönberg
1990–91	Warsaw Concerto by Richard Addinsell	Piano Concerto No. 5 "Emperor" by Ludwig van Beethoven; Rhapsody on a Theme of Paganini Variation XVIII by Sergei Rachmaninoff; Finlandia by Jean Sibelius	Rhythm of the Rain by The Cascades; Singin' in the Rain by Nacio Herb Brown; Over the Rainbow by Harold Arlen; On My Own by Claude-Michel Schönberg
1989–90	Anvil Chorus by Giuseppe Verdi arranged by Jerry Gray; Memories of You by Eubie Blake	Scheherazade by Nikolai Rimsky-Korsakov	Yotei no Matsuri by Yasuhiro Sakurada; Mission: Impossible by Lalo Schifrin; On My Own by Claude-Michel Schonberg
1988–89	Fantastic Tango by Shinji Wakita	A Classical Rock; Concerto No.1 for Piano by Frank Mills	Somewhere Out There by James Horner; Conga by Gloria Estefan & The Miami Sound Machine
1987–88	Yotei no Matsuri by Yasuhiro Sakurada	Le Corsaire Pas de Deux Adagio by Riccardo Drigo; Marco Spada Ballet; Grand Pas Classique Coda by Daniel Auber; Paquita Adagio/Coda by Ludwig Minkus	Time Passage by Seiko Matsuda; Aramis'78 Image album by Akiko Yano; Sweet Dreamer by Yoko Takarada
1986–87	Nine to Five soundtrack by Charles Fox	Magical City by Mika Yamashita	Aramis'78 Image album by Akiko Yano
1985–86	Tyrolean fairy by Mika Yamashita, Chihiro Yamashita	Magical City by Mika Yamashita	
1984–85	Sweet Dreamer by Yoko Takarada	Ice Paradice by Tokiko Tsunoda	Sweet Dreamer by Yoko Takarada
1983–84		Rightning Attacker by Ryudo Uzaki; Unknown	Kotoriya-no-Mise (The Bird Shop); Aim for the Ace! opening theme by Goh Misawa
1982–83		Rightning Attacker by Ryudo Uzaki	
1981–82	Nine to Five soundtrack by Charles Fox		

== Results ==
International
Event	79–80	80–81	81–82	82–83	83–84	84–85	85–86	86–87	87–88	88–89	89–90	90–91	91–92	95–96
Olympics									5th				2nd	
Worlds					7th		11th	8th	6th	1st	2nd	4th		7th
Skate America										2nd		2nd		
Skate Canada						1st								
Fujifilm Trophy									1st					
Int. de Paris													1st	
NHK Trophy						1st	1st	2nd	2nd	1st	1st	1st	1st	
Prague Skate					1st									
International Challenge Cup					2nd									
International: Junior
Junior Worlds		8th	6th		3rd									
National
Japan Champ.		3rd			2nd	1st	1st	1st	1st	1st	1st	1st	1st	1st
Japan Junior	1st				1st									

== Records and achievements ==
=== Amateur ===
- First World Champion from an Asian country (1989).
- First woman to land a triple-triple jump combination (1981).
- First woman to land a double loop-triple loop combination (in the short program) (1983).
- First woman to land five different triple jumps in competition (1983).
- First woman to land a triple Axel in competition (1988).
- First woman to land six different triple jumps in competition (1989).
- First woman to land a triple Axel in the Olympics (1992).

=== Awards ===
- Inducted into the World Figure Skating Hall of Fame (2003).

=== Triple Axel ===
Ito landed 18 triple Axels in competition.

1988–89	Aichi Prefecture Championships (FS); Japanese Free Skating Championships (FS); NHK Trophy (FS); Japan Figure Skating Championships (FS); World Championships (FS)
1989–90	NHK Trophy (FS); World Championships (FS)
1990–91	East Japan Championships (FS); NHK Trophy (FS); Japan Figure Skating Championships (FS)
1991–92	East Japan Championships (FS); Trophee Lalique (FS); NHK Trophy (SP(combination with double toe loop), FS(combination with double toe loop)); Japan Figure Skating Championships (SP(combination with double toe loop), FS); Winter Olympics (FS)
1995–96	Japan Figure Skating Championships (FS)

== Media appearances ==
=== DVD ===
- 伊藤みどりのフィギュアスケート・ライフ努力編 (2006) – ASIN B000O77KHK
- 伊藤みどりのフィギュアスケート・ライフ人生編 (2007) – ASIN B000OI1BXS
- 伊藤みどりのフィギュアスケート・ライフ (2007) – ASIN B000SB2ZT0

=== Book ===
- タイム・パッセージ―時間旅行（1993）- ISBN 978-4-314-10081-6
- 伊藤みどり物語 (1992) – ISBN 978-4-87208-036-0
- 氷上の宝石―伊藤みどり写真集 (1993) – ISBN 978-4-317-80036-2

== In other media ==
- She is briefly seen in the film I, Tonya (2017) played by actress Fi Dieter in an uncredited role.

Olympic Games
Preceded by Muhammad Ali	Final Olympic torchbearer Nagano 1998	Succeeded by Cathy Freeman
Preceded by Haakon Magnus, Crown Prince of Norway	Final Winter Olympic torchbearer Nagano 1998	Succeeded by 1980 USA Men's Ice Hockey Team
