= Isabelle Duchesnay =

French ice dancer

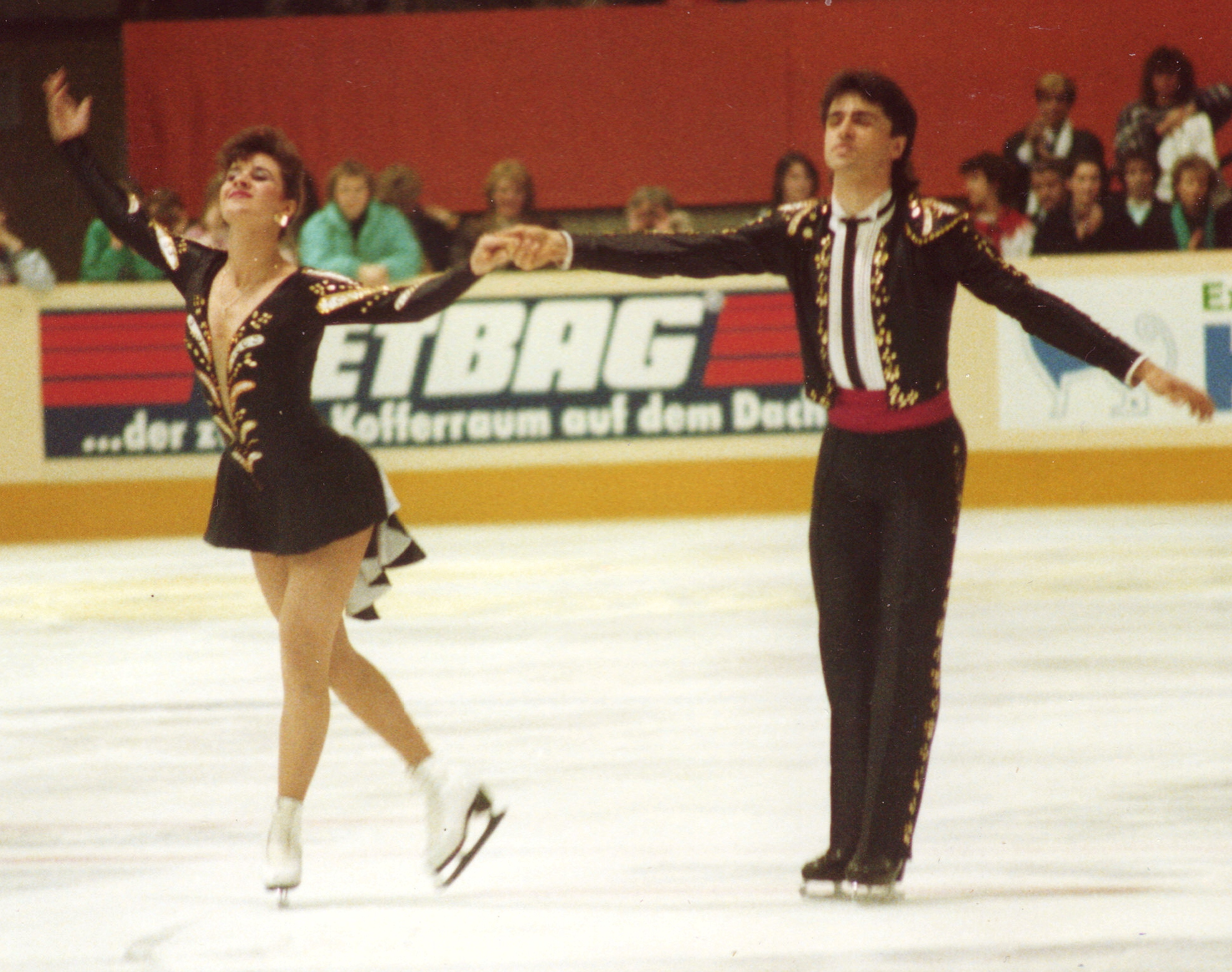
- The Duchesnays at an Exhibition in Berlin in 1989

Personal information
- Born: December 18, 1963 (age 62) Aylmer, Quebec, Canada
- Height: 5 ft 6 in (1.68 m)

Figure skating career
- Country: France
- Retired: 1996
Medal record
Figure skating
Ice dancing
Representing France
Olympic Games
| Silver medal – second place | 1992 Albertville | Ice dancing |
World Championships
| Gold medal – first place | 1991 Munich | Ice dancing |
| Silver medal – second place | 1990 Halifax | Ice dancing |
| Bronze medal – third place | 1989 Paris | Ice dancing |
European Championships
| Silver medal – second place | 1991 Sofia | Ice dancing |
| Bronze medal – third place | 1988 Prague | Ice dancing |
| Bronze medal – third place | 1990 Leningrad | Ice dancing |

Isabelle Duchesnay (born December 18, 1963) is a retired ice dancer who represented France for most of her career. With her brother Paul Duchesnay, she is the 1991 World champion and the 1992 Olympic silver medalist.

== Career ==
The Duchesnays started skating at an early age in Canada in pairs. Their first major success came at the 1982 Canadian Nationals, where they placed second in the junior competition. After a serious accident where Isabelle hit her head, they switched to ice dancing. Over time, the Duchesnays’ skating became more innovative and revolutionary with help from 1984 Olympic champion Christopher Dean. After Skate Canada criticized their skating, they decided to leave the Canadian team. Writer Ellyn Kestnbaum states, about Dean's choreography of the Duchesnays' programs: "Once Dean began to choreograph their programs in 1988, they introduced a whole new range of meanings to the issue of a man and woman skating together on the ice". In 1985, they began skating for their mother's homeland, France. They were coached by Martin Skotnicky, based out of Oberstdorf, Germany. They also switched teams because they felt they were not progressing as quickly as they thought they should in Canada.

The Duchesnays' 1988 Winter Olympics programs were considered unusual. Their free dance, a jungle-inspired dance set to drums, was not well received by judges and they finished eighth overall. Kestnbaum states that although the Duchesnays were not expected to win a gold medal at the Olympics so early in their career, their "novelty and the originality of their style made an impression". It was reported that the spectators in Calgary enjoyed their free skating program, which was described as a "comedic, melodramic tango", as well as "percussive" and "tribal", the judges' disparate scores, however, demonstrated that they did not know what to make of the program. Despite the judges’ reactions, the Duchesnays continued skating in their unusual and innovative style. They placed third and second in the 1989 and 1990 World Championships, respectively.

The Duchesnays came in second place at the 1991 European Championships in Sofia, Bulgaria. Kestnbam calls their free dance program "controversial". They both wore blue-violet trousers and shirts; Isabelle Duchesnay wore her hair french-braided against her head, which emulated Paul Duchesnay's shorter curls. The choreography was focused on the theme of mirror images. As Kestnbaum states, "It was not always possible to distinguish which skater was Paul and which was Isabelle". Kestnbaum goes on to state, "All markers of difference seem to have been suppressed in service of the mirror image theme; the skaters' bodies are gendered as neutral". Additionally, the Duchesnays' choice of trousers for both skaters pushed the gender neutrality depicted in the program towards maleness because female skaters did not typically wear trousers; Kestnbaum stated that it depicted Isabelle Duchesnay as "cross-dressed on the ice", which Kestnbaum called an "instant of transvestitism" that "profoundly disturbed the skating world, so accustomed to perceiving male/female differences as a given". Their program did not go well with the judges; according to Christopher Dean, who choreographed the program, they were told that they had no hope of winning the Worlds Championships with it because it was too contemporary and avant-garde. According to Kestnbaum, the Duchesnays' experimentation—which resisted the ballroom origins of ice dancing—influenced other ice dancers. The gender dynamics in their programs, due to their status as siblings, also resisted the "traditional clichés" of the sport.

According to Kestnbaum, their program's innovative symbols and movements were necessary because "if they fully enacted the erotic narratives of either ballroom or classical dance, they might raise the specter of incest".

The Duchesnays won their only World title at the 1991 Worlds in Munich, Germany. Determined to win the gold medal, they came to Munich with a new free dance program, entitled "Missing II," a sequel to their previous season's free dance, about the disappeared victims of Latin American dictatorships. As in 1990, Isabelle Duchesnay wore a tattered knee-length dress and a red leotard, while Paul Duchesnay wore dark trousers, a blue striped shirt with torn-up sleeves, and a red tie. Kestnbaum reports that although the partners wore costumes traditionally ascribed to their respective genders, "the choreography avoids narrativizing gender binarism". Kestnbaum also states that the fast section of their free dance, which occurred at the end of the program, "becomes a symbolic victory over oppression and an actual victory for the Duchesnays".

As the reigning world champions, Duchesnays were favoured to win gold at the 1992 Winter Olympics in Albertville, France, in their adopted home country. They won the silver medal behind Marina Klimova and Sergei Ponomarenko. Their free skate was set to music from West Side Story; they portrayed the characters Maria and Bernardo, brother and sister in the musical. Isabelle Duchesnay wears a diagonally cut purple dress, but her version of Maria seemed to be an active member of the Sharks, the street gang in West Side Story, unlike the character depicted in the original musical and film. As Kestnbaum states, "the Duchesnays erase sexual difference by making the girl one of the boys. Again masculinity is valorized as normative, but it is not the exclusive property of biological males".

The Duchesnays then retired from amateur competition and competed professionally until Paul suffered a serious rollerblading accident in 1996. In 1996, the Duchesnays were nominated for a Gemini Award in Best Performance - Performing Arts Program or Series for their performance in "The Planets". Isabelle Duchesnay wrote a book, Notre passion (Sports pour tous), in 1992.

== Personal life ==
Isabelle Duchesnay was born to a French mother and Canadian father. She also had an elder brother, Gaston who died in 1991. She married British ice dancer Christopher Dean in 1991; they divorced in 1993.

== Results ==
(ice dance with Paul Duchesnay)

International
| Event | 1981–82 | 1982–83 | 1983–84 | 1984–85 | 1985–86 | 1986–87 | 1987–88 | 1988–89 | 1989–90 | 1990–91 | 1991–92 |
|---|---|---|---|---|---|---|---|---|---|---|---|
| Olympics | | | | | | | 8th | | | | 2nd |
| Worlds | | | | | 12th | 9th | 6th | 3rd | 2nd | 1st | |
| Europeans | | | | | 8th | 5th | 3rd | | 3rd | 2nd | |
| Skate America | | | | | | 1st | | | | | |
| Nebelhorn | | 2nd | | | | | | | | | |
National
| French | | | | | 1st | 1st | | | 1st | 1st | |
| Canadian | 2nd J | 4th | 4th | 3rd | | | | | | | |
J = Junior

== Amateur career programs ==
| Season | Original Set Pattern Dance | Free Dance | Exhibition |
|---|---|---|---|
| 1991-1992 | Polka - The Lonely Goatherd from The Sound of Music Soundtrack Choreographed by Christopher Dean | West Side Story soundtrack by Leonard Bernstein Choreographed by Christopher Dean | |
| 1990-1991 | Blues - from A Streetcar Named Desire Soundtrack Choreographed by Christopher Dean | Missing II - Atahualpa and Cacharpaya by Inti Illmani Choreographed by Christopher Dean; Reflections - Ocean Waves by George Winston Choreographed by Christopher Dean | Tango; Blues |
| 1989-1990 | Samba - Instrumental version of Late in the Evening by Paul Simon Choreographed by Christopher Dean | Missing I - Dolencias and Sikuriades by Inti Illimani Choreographed by Christopher Dean | Malaguena by Ernesto Lecuona; Missing I - Dolencias and Sikuriades by Inti Illimani Choreographed by Christopher Dean |
| 1988-1989 | Charleston - Josephine Baker Choreographed by Christopher Dean | Instrumental version of Eleanor Rigby by The Beatles Choreographed by Christopher Dean | |
| 1987-1988 | Argentine tango Choreographed by Christopher Dean | Savage Rites using War Dance by Mandingo Choreographed by Christopher Dean | |
| 1986-1987 | Waltz - The Skater's Waltz Op.183 by Emile Waldteufel | Malaguena by Ernesto Lecuona | Paso Doble/Flamenco |

== Works cited ==
- Kestnbaum, Ellyn (2003). Culture on Ice: Figure Skating and Cultural Meaning. Middleton, Connecticut: Wesleyan Publishing Press.
