= Sergei Ponomarenko =

Russian ice dancer (born 1960)

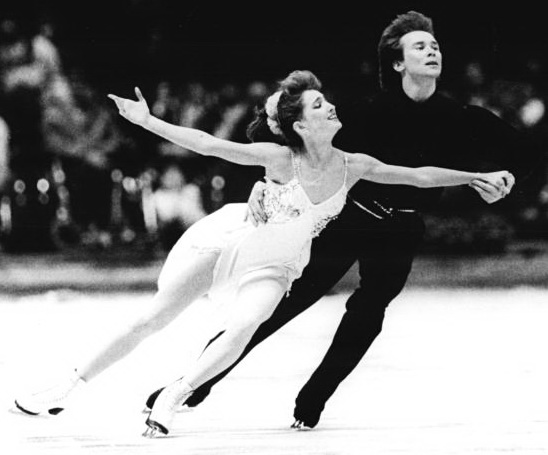
- Klimova and Ponomarenko in 1989

Personal information
- Full name: Sergei Vladilenovich Ponomarenko
- Born: October 6, 1960 (age 65) Balkhash, Kazakh SSR, Soviet Union
- Height: 1.73 m (5 ft 8 in)

Figure skating career
- Country: Unified Team; Soviet Union
Medal record
Figure skating
Ice dancing
Representing CIS ( Unified Team)
Olympic Games
Gold medal – first place	1992 Albertville	Ice dancing
World Championships
Gold medal – first place	1992 Oakland	Ice dancing
European Championships
Gold medal – first place	1992 Lausanne	Ice dancing
Representing Soviet Union
Olympic Games
Silver medal – second place	1988 Calgary	Ice dancing
Bronze medal – third place	1984 Sarajevo	Ice dancing
World Championships
Gold medal – first place	1989 Birmingham	Ice dancing
Gold medal – first place	1990 Halifax	Ice dancing
Silver medal – second place	1985 Tokyo	Ice dancing
Silver medal – second place	1986 Geneva	Ice dancing
Silver medal – second place	1987 Cincinnati	Ice dancing
Silver medal – second place	1988 Budapest	Ice dancing
Silver medal – second place	1991 Munich	Ice dancing
European Championships
Gold medal – first place	1989 Birmingham	Ice dancing
Gold medal – first place	1990 Leningrad	Ice dancing
Gold medal – first place	1991 Sofia	Ice dancing
Silver medal – second place	1985 Gothenburg	Ice dancing
Silver medal – second place	1986 Sarajevo	Ice dancing
Silver medal – second place	1987 Sarajevo	Ice dancing
Bronze medal – third place	1984 Budapest	Ice dancing
World Junior Championships
Gold medal – first place	1978 Megève	Ice dancing
Gold medal – first place	1979 Augsburg	Ice dancing

Sergei Ponomarenko
Medal record

Figure skating

Representing the Soviet Union
Silver medal – second place	1988 Calgary	Ice dancing
Bronze medal – third place	1984 Sarajevo	Ice dancing

Representing the Unified Team
Gold medal – first place	1992 Albertville	Ice dancing

Sergei Vladilenovich Ponomarenko (Russian: Серге́й Владиленович Пономаренко; born October 6, 1960) is a Russian former competitive ice dancer who competed for the Soviet Union and the Unified team. With skating partner and wife Marina Klimova, he is the 1992 Olympic champion, 1988 Olympic silver medalist, 1984 Olympic bronze medalist, three-time World champion, and four-time European champion.

== Career ==
Ponomarenko trained at Spartak in Moscow. Early in his career, he competed with Tatiana Durasova, becoming the 1978 and 1979 World Junior champion. Following their split, he teamed up with Marina Klimova.

Klimova and Ponomarenko were fourth in their European Championships debut in 1983. Their breakthrough came the following season when they won the bronze medal at the 1984 Winter Olympics and 1984 European Championships. In 1985, they won their first World medal, silver. They were four-time consecutive World silver medalists from 1985 to 1988. In 1988, they also won the Olympic silver medal, behind Natalia Bestemianova and Andrei Bukin.

In 1989, Klimova and Ponomarenko won the first of their four consecutive European titles. They also won the 1989 World Championships and narrowly won another World gold in 1990 on the strength of their compulsories and their original dance, even though they lost the free dance to Isabelle Duchesnay and Paul Duchesnay from France. In 1991, their free dance was choreographed to music from the film Lawrence of Arabia; figure skating writer Ellyn Kestnbaum states that the program "escapes gendering by representing different elements of nature", with Ponomarenko, who wore a brown unitard, representing the sands of the desert and Klimova representing the wind. Kestnbaum states that their free dance "replicates classical gender positions". Kestnbaum also states their the relationship Klimova and Ponomarenko present "is not gendered stereotypically, but it is figured as difference, as opposing elements".

Four months before the Olympics, they decided to leave coach Natalia Dubova. They re-established themselves as the top ice dancers in the world by winning another 1992 European title and then capturing the 1992 Olympic title. He became one of the oldest figure skating Olympic champions. They ended their season with their third World title. They retired from eligible skating after the World Championships and turned to professional and show skating.

Their free skate program at the 1992 Winter Olympics, entitled "A Man and a Woman: From the Mundane to the Sublime," "returned to the images of difference and woman as other". Ponomarenko and Klimova's costumes were both black and gray: he wore a loose shirt and trousers, with a sash around his waist, while she wore a black unitard with gray chiffon-like webbings or wings between her arms and legs and a spiderweb across her chest, and wore her red curly hair loose over her shoulders. Kestnbaum called their program "a highly eroticized duet to music by J.S. Bach". Kestnbaum also reported that the program displayed Ponomarenko's strength and Kimova's beauty and flexibility, stating that their movements, spider imagery, and costumes depicted that "the man is normative and the woman an exotic danger".

In addition to winning three World championships and four European Championships, Klimova and Ponomarenko are the first figure skaters in any discipline to have won Olympic medals in three different colors. They won the bronze medal in 1984 Sarajevo, the silver medal in 1988 Calgary for the Soviet Union and the gold medal in 1992 Albertville for the Unified Team.

Klimova and Ponomarenko were inducted into the World Figure Skating Hall of Fame in 2000. Ponomarenko is an ISU technical specialist for Russia. He and his wife coach young figure skaters at Sharks Ice at San Jose, California. They were known as "traditionalists with a light elegant touch" and for excelling both technically and artistically.

== Personal life ==
Klimova and Ponomarenko married in September 1984. They now reside in the United States in Morgan Hill, California. They have two sons, Tim Ponomarenko, born in 1998, and Anthony Ponomarenko, born on January 5, 2001, in San Jose, California. Anthony is a competitive ice dancer, making his first Olympic appearance for the United States with his skating partner Christina Carreira in 2026.

== Programs ==
(With Klimova)

Season	Original set pattern / Original dance	Free dance	Exhibition
1992–1996			Evergreen by Luther Vandross; Gone with the Wind by Max Steiner; Summertime from Porgy and Bess by George Gershwin; Romeo and Juliet by Pyotr Tchaikovsky; Clowns March to Sousa; The Brides from Dracula (1992 film) by Wojciech Kilar; Adagio of Spartacus and Phrygia by Aram Khachaturian; Masquerade Waltz by Aram Khachaturian; Song of India; Symphony No. 5 by Pyotr Tchaikovsky
1991–1992		Air from Suite No.3 by Johann Sebastian Bach; Toccata and Fugue in D minor, BWV 565 by Johann Sebastian Bach, Leopold Stokowski	E lucevan le stelle from Tosca by Giacomo Puccini
1990–1991		Lawrence of Arabia by Maurice Jarre	
1989–1990		My Fair Lady by Frederick Loewe	
1988–1989		Mack the Knife by Kurt Weill	
1987–1988		Yesterday; I Want to Hold Your Hand; Let It Be; Get Back; Ob-La-Di, Ob-La-Da by The Beatles	La cumparsita by Gerardo Matos Rodríguez
1986–1987		Hungarian Rhapsody by Franz Liszt	
1985–1986			
1984–1985			
1983–1984		The Circus Princess by Emmerich Kálmán	
1982–1983			

== Results ==
=== With Klimova ===
International
Event	80–81	81–82	82–83	83–84	84–85	85–86	86–87	87–88	88–89	89–90	90–91	91–92
Olympics				3rd				2nd				1st
Worlds				4th	2nd	2nd	2nd	2nd	1st	1st	2nd	1st
Europeans			4th	3rd	2nd	2nd	2nd		1st	1st	1st	1st
Goodwill Games											1st	
Fujifilm Trophy								1st				
Moscow News			3rd		1st	2nd	1st	1st	1st			
Nebelhorn			1st	1st								
Golden Spin		2nd										
St. Gervais			1st	1st								
National
Soviet Champ.	8th	6th	5th		1st	1st		1st	1st	1st		
Spartakiada		3rd										

Professional career

Event	1994–95	1995–96
World Professional Championships	2nd	2nd

=== With Durasova ===
International
Event	1977–78	1978–79	1979–80
Nebelhorn Trophy			3rd
International: Junior
World Junior Champ.	1st	1st	
