= Ekaterina Gordeeva =

Soviet-Russian pair skater (born 1971)

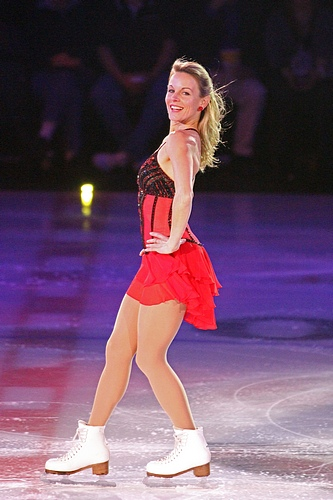
- Gordeeva in 2012
- Born: Ekaterina Alexandrovna Gordeeva; 28 May 1971 (age 55); Moscow, USSR
- Spouses: Sergei Grinkov (m. 1991; d. 1995); Ilia Kulik (m. 2002; div. 2016); David Pelletier (m. 2020)
- Children: 2
- Figure skating career
- Country: Soviet Union; Russia
- Partner: Sergei Grinkov
- Coach: Marina Zoueva; Stanislav Zhuk
- Retired: 1994
Medal record
Pairs' Figure skating
Representing Russia
Olympic Games
| Gold medal – first place | 1994 Lillehammer | Pairs |
European Championships
| Gold medal – first place | 1994 Copenhagen | Pairs |
Representing Soviet Union
Olympic Games
| Gold medal – first place | 1988 Calgary | Pairs |
World Championships
| Gold medal – first place | 1986 Geneva | Pairs |
| Gold medal – first place | 1987 Cincinnati | Pairs |
| Gold medal – first place | 1989 Paris | Pairs |
| Gold medal – first place | 1990 Halifax | Pairs |
| Silver medal – second place | 1988 Budapest | Pairs |
European Championships
| Gold medal – first place | 1988 Prague | Pairs |
| Gold medal – first place | 1990 Leningrad | Pairs |
| Silver medal – second place | 1986 Copenhagen | Pairs |

Ekaterina "Katia" Alexandrovna Gordeeva (Russian: Екатерина Александровна Гордеева; born 28 May 1971) is a Soviet and Russian figure skater. With her late husband Sergei Grinkov, she is the 1988 and 1994 Olympic Champion, a four-time World Champion (1986, 1987, 1989, 1990), a three-time European Champion (1988, 1990, 1994), the 1990 Goodwill Games champion, 1987 Soviet champion, and 1994 Russian champion in pair skating. After Grinkov's death, Gordeeva continued performing as a singles skater.

== Early life ==
Gordeeva was born on 28 May 1971 in Moscow, Russia, then part of the Soviet Union. Her father, Alexander Alexeyevich Gordeev, was a dancer for the Alexandrov Song and Dance Ensemble, while her mother, Elena Lvovna Gordeeva, is a teletype operator for TASS. Gordeeva has a younger sister. Gordeeva has stated, "[My father] worked with me on movement very often when I was little."

== Pairs career ==
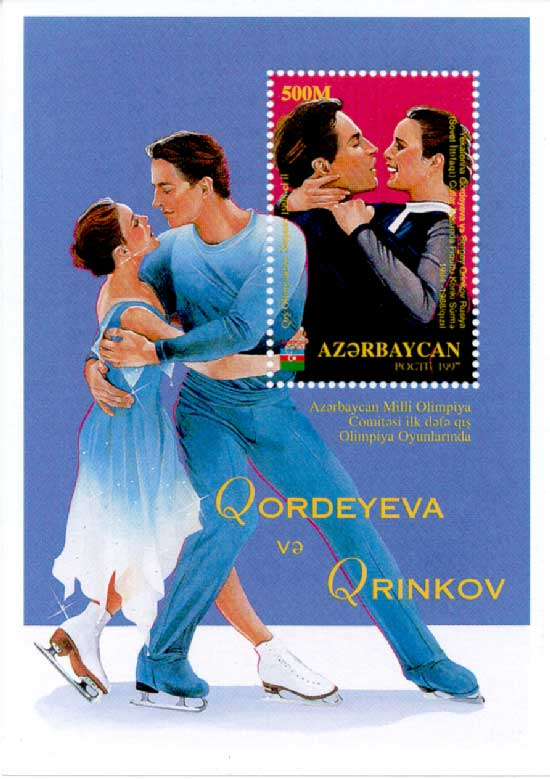
Gordeeva and Grinkov on an Azerbaijani stamp of 1998

Gordeeva began figure skating at age four, when she entered Children and Youth Sports School of CSKA Moscow. She wore multiple pairs of socks inside skates many sizes too big because skates small enough for her feet were unavailable in the Soviet Union. She was not a particularly strong jumper, and in August 1981, coach Vladimir Zaharov paired the 10-year-old Gordeeva with the 14-year-old Sergei Grinkov. Because Grinkov frequently missed practice, their coach eventually insisted that Gordeeva pair with someone else, but she refused. Instead, the pair changed coaches.

Gordeeva and Grinkov won the 1985 World Junior Figure Skating Championships in Colorado Springs, Colorado. The following year they won the first of their four World Figure Skating Championships. They are one of the few pair teams to win back-to-back junior and senior world championship titles. They successfully defended their world title in 1987. In November 1987, Grinkov caught a blade on the ice during a practice session and dropped Gordeeva on her forehead. She was hospitalized for a time, but they were still able to compete in and win a gold medal at the 1988 Winter Olympics, which began the following February in Calgary, Alberta, Canada. They remain the youngest pairs team ever to win Olympic gold. After a fall in their long program, they took silver at the World Championships in 1988, but reclaimed the title in 1989 and 1990. They turned professional in the fall 1990, winning their first World Professional Championship in 1991. They also won that title in 1992 and 1994.

Gordeeva and Grinkov won almost every competition they entered. In the 31 competitions whose results are known at the senior and professional levels, they finished first 24 times and never lower than second place from the time they won their first senior world title. They are one of the few pair teams in history to successfully complete a quadruple twist lift in international competition. They landed the difficult element with ease at the 1987 World Championships.

They also completed the element at the 1987 European Championships, but due to a problem with Grinkov's boot strap and a misunderstanding about the rules (the referee signaled them to stop, going so far as to turn off their music, but they continued skating), they were disqualified from that event. They stopped performing the quad twist because it made no significant improvement to their marks, making the added physical stress unnecessary.

Katia writes in her book, My Sergei: A Love Story, that this element raised her heart rate and blood pressure to levels that alarmed the Soviet team's doctors. "That summer we had learned a very difficult move called the quadruple split twist," she wrote, "in which Sergei threw me in the air, I did a split, then closed my legs and made four turns before he caught me. We were the only pair to do this quadruple element, and it was very exhausting—more exhausting than difficult, really. Soviet doctors had measured my pulse rate as exceeding two hundred beats per minute when I did it."

By 1989, the skating partnership had grown into a romantic relationship. They shared their first kiss on New Year's Eve 1988 and were married in April 1991. Their state wedding was on 20 April and the church wedding was on 28 April. From November 1991 through April 1992, they toured with Stars on Ice for the first time. On 11 September 1992, their daughter, Daria Sergeyevna Grinkova, was born in Morristown, New Jersey. Shortly after Daria's birth, Gordeeva resumed training for the new season of Stars on Ice, which premiered in November 1992 and continued through the following April.

When a new ISU rule allowed professional skaters to regain their Olympic eligibility, Gordeeva and Grinkov decided to return to amateur competition for the 1993–94 season and skate in the Olympics. In 1994, the couple won their second Olympic gold medal in Lillehammer, Oppland, Norway.

After the Olympics, the pair returned to professional skating and moved to Simsbury, Connecticut. During the 1994–95 season, they toured with Stars on Ice, this time as headliners. That year, Gordeeva was named one of the "50 Most Beautiful People" by People Magazine. That summer, Gordeeva and Grinkov were chosen for induction into the World Figure Skating Hall of Fame.

They planned to return to Stars on Ice for their fourth season with the tour. On 20 November 1995, while the pair were rehearsing in Lake Placid, New York, for opening night of the upcoming tour, Grinkov collapsed on the ice and died at age 28 from a massive heart attack. Doctors later discovered that he had a congenital heart condition which caused his death.

Gordeeva and Grinkov are often ranked among the greatest pair teams in the history of figure skating. They are commonly referred to as "G&G". They were known for their basic skating technique: "Grinkov and Gordeeva had something special that was more easily appreciated in person. They didn't make noise when they skated. They moved so fluidly that their blades whispered over the ice, not scratching at it."

== Solo career ==
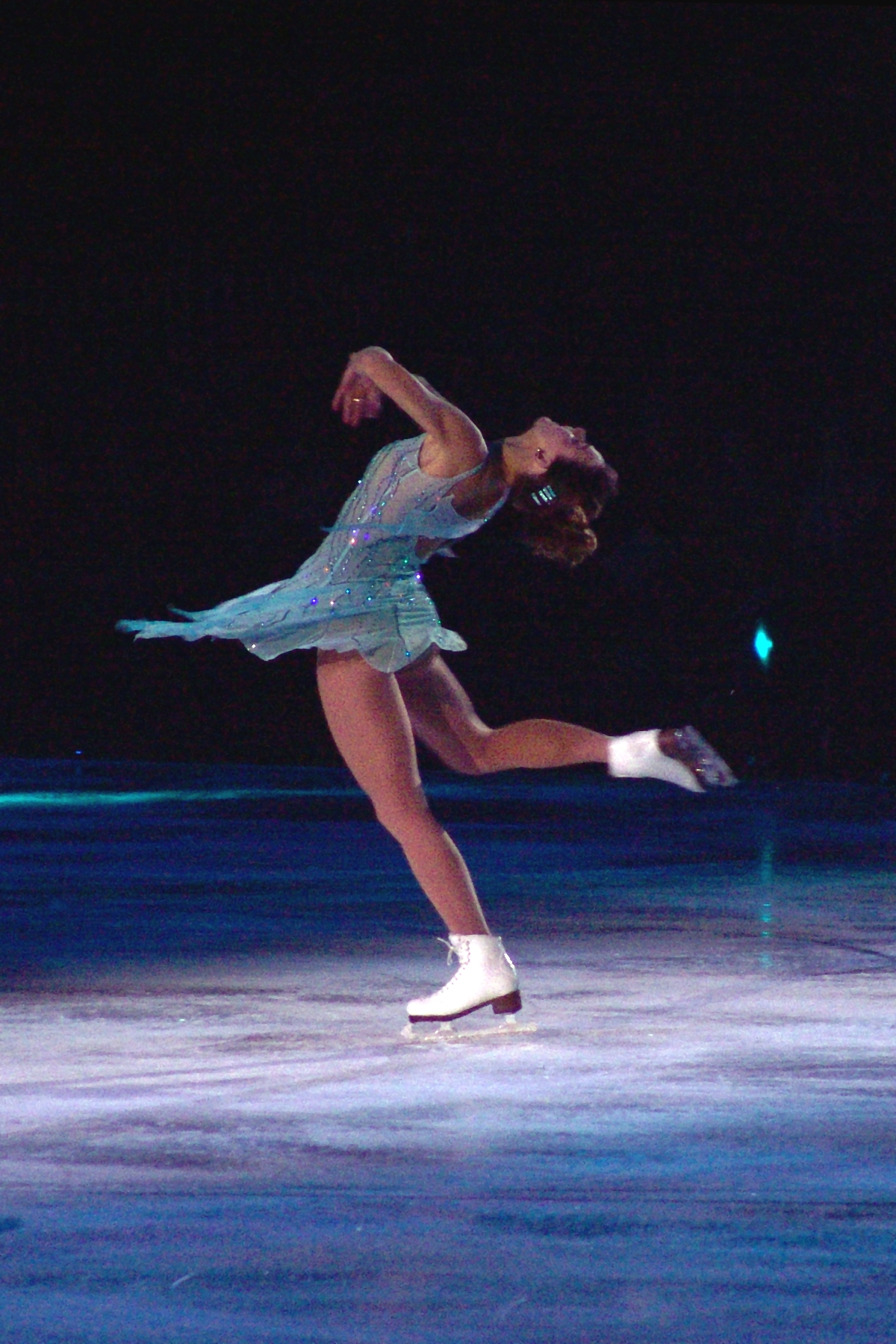
Gordeeva performs solo in Smucker's Stars on Ice at the Arena at Harbor Yard in Bridgeport in 2007.

In February 1996, Gordeeva returned to the ice, this time as a solo performer. Her first performance was a tribute to her late husband, skated to the "Adagietto" section of Gustav Mahler's "Symphony No. 5." The number was publicly performed only twice, first at a preview performance at the Minto Skating Club in Ottawa, Ontario, and then on 27 February 1996, in a televised tribute to Grinkov called "Celebration of a Life," in which numerous skating luminaries took part. Gordeeva has said that she felt as if she skated with Sergei that night, that she was "double strong" because she felt him with her. The same year, with the aid of author E. M. Swift, she told her story in a book titled My Sergei: A Love Story. In February 1998, CBS aired an eponymous docudrama based on the book. She published a second book in April 1998, titled A Letter for Daria. In 1998, she told an interviewer that "My life of great skating, and skating with him, is over ... I don't try to go now for Olympics. I take skating for a job."

Gordeeva returned to Stars on Ice as a solo skater in 1996 and toured with the show every year until 2000, when she took time off to give birth to another daughter, Elizaveta Ilinichna Kulik, in June 2001. Gordeeva has returned to the tour as a guest star many times, but has never returned to full-time touring. In addition to tours and shows, Gordeeva competed successfully as a professional solo skater, finishing as high as second place at the World Professional Championships (in 1997). She stopped competing in 2000, but continues to skate in professional skating tours, shows and competitions. While she has never returned to pair skating as a full-time endeavor, she has performed pair elements in many shows through the years with partners including Artur Dmitriev, Anton Sikharulidze, David Pelletier and John Zimmerman. For the 1998–1999 season of Stars on Ice, she and fellow Russians Ilia Kulik, Elena Bechke and Denis Petrov performed a quartet which showcased her pair skills, and in 1999–2000, she and Kulik skated a romantic duet during the tour.

Gordeeva has signed several endorsement contracts, the most notable of which was with Target and led to two perfumes ("Katia" and "Katia Sport") which were sold through Target stores. Gordeeva and her daughter, Daria, appeared in the 1997 holiday movie Snowden on Ice as part of the CBS Sports Special; Gordeeva appeared in the 1998 sequel, Snowden's Raggedy Ann and Andy Holiday Show. She has represented Rolex and also appeared with Daria in a "Got Milk?" ad.

In 2001, she was the subject of a Lenox figurine called "Katia's Celebration of Life," which depicts her performing a layback spin in the tribute she skated for Grinkov. She also appeared in the 2003 Sports Illustrated Swimsuit Issue as a featured athlete. In 2003, she appeared on the ice for the first time with Daria. The pair performed a duet during a Mother's Day show and took the ice together several times since 2003, including two different versions of Amy Grant's "Children of the World" at Kristi Yamaguchi's "Family & Friends" shows in 2005 and 2006. During that show in 2007, the mother-daughter duo became a trio when they were joined by Gordeeva's younger daughter, Liza, and all three skated together to "Homesick" performed live by The Cheetah Girls. Since 2007, all three are amateur skaters together.

In 2007, Gordeeva starred in Skate for the Heart, a show designed to raise awareness of heart disease. She skated in honor of Grinkov. Gordeeva briefly returned to pairs skating during the 2008–09 season when she participated in the second season of Russian reality television show Ice Age. She was paired with Russian actor Egor Beroev and they won the show. During the taping of Ice Age 2, she flew to the United States from Russia to headline Skate for the Heart a second time. She dedicated a number to the memory of her father, Alexander Gordeev, who died of a heart attack in 2008. In 2010, she was paired with hockey player Valeri Bure in another figure skating reality show, season 2 of Battle of the Blades. In the 22 November 2010 finale, she and Bure won the competition. Gordeeva rejoined Stars on Ice in November 2010 for the 25th Anniversary Tour.

In addition to her skating, Gordeeva has ventured into coaching and choreography. She is currently a member of the coaching team at the Ice Palace Figure Skating Club in West Edmonton Mall.

== Personal life ==
Gordeeva and Grinkov had a state wedding on 20 April 1991 and a church wedding on 28 April. Their daughter, Daria Sergeyevna Gordeeva-Grinkova, was born on 11 September 1992, in Morristown, New Jersey. On 20 November 1995, Grinkov died of a heart attack during practice in Lake Placid, New York.

On 15 June 2001, Gordeeva gave birth to her second daughter, Elizaveta (or the diminutive "Liza," pronounced LEE-za) Ilinichna Kulik. Her father is 1998 Olympic men's singles champion Ilia Kulik. Gordeeva and Kulik married in a private ceremony in San Francisco on 10 June 2002.

Gordeeva and her family resided in California for several years before moving to Avon, Connecticut, in 2003. They returned to the Los Angeles area in 2007 and resided in Newport Beach, California. Gordeeva, Kulik, Daria, and Elizaveta made their first televised appearance as a family for Kristi Yamaguchi's Friends and Family in 2005 and appeared in the 2006 and 2007 versions of the show. Gordeeva and her family spoke Russian at home and frequently traveled to Russia.

In 2012, Kulik and Gordeeva opened Kulik's Skating, an ice rink and figure skating training environment in Lake Forest, California. Gordeeva and Kulik divorced in 2016.

Gordeeva married Canadian figure skater and 2002 Olympic pairs champion David Pelletier on 25 July 2020. They live in Edmonton, Alberta, Canada.

== Programs ==
Paired with Sergei Grinkov.

| Season | Short program | Free skating | Exhibition |
|---|---|---|---|
| 1994–1995 | | | From Requiem: Dies Irae; Lacrymosa; Sanctus by Giuseppe Verdi; Vocalise, Op. 34, No. 14 by Sergei Rachmaninoff; The Man I Love by Ella Fitzgerald; Out of Tears by The Rolling Stones; Crazy for You by George Gershwin; Pocahontas |
| 1993–1994 | Zapateado; Farrucas by Pepe Romero; Picasso Suite: The Dancer by Michel Legrand | Piano Sonata No. 8 "Pathétique"; Piano Sonata No. 14 "Moonlight" by Ludwig van Beethoven performed by Vladimir Horowitz | Reverie by Claude Debussy; Porgy and Bess by George Gershwin |
| 1990–1993 | | | Maria from West Side Story by Leonard Bernstein; Pas de Deux from The Nutcracker by Pyotr Tchaikovsky; A Whole New World from Aladdin; Pagliacci; Scheherazade by Nikolai Rimsky-Korsakov; Jesus Christ Superstar by Andrew Lloyd Webber |
| 1989–1990 | Mambo No.5/Mambo Jambo by Pérez Prado | Romeo and Juliet by Pyotr Tchaikovsky | Still Loving You by Scorpions; Meditation from Thaïs by Jules Massenet; Cha Cha Cha |
| 1988–1989 | The Barber of Seville by Gioachino Rossini | Die Fledermaus by Johann Strauss II | Liebestraum |
| 1987–1988 | From Carmen: Les Toreadores; La garde montante by Georges Bizet | Symphony No. 4 by Felix Mendelssohn; Concerto No.2; Etude No.12 "Revolutionary"; Concerto No.1 by Frédéric Chopin; Overture from The Marriage of Figaro by Wolfgang Amadeus Mozart | Katyusha |
| 1986–1987 | Jazz Medley | Caravans by Duke Ellington | |
| 1985–1986 | Temptation Rag by Claude Bolling | Caravans; Send In the Clowns | Fly, doves! by Isaak Dunayevsky |
| 1984–1985 | unknown | Through the Eyes of Love by Marvin Hamlisch | |
| 1983–1984 | Zorba the Greek by Mikis Theodorakis | unknown | |

== Results ==
Paired with Sergei Grinkov.

International
| Event | 83–84 | 84–85 | 85–86 | 86–87 | 87–88 | 88–89 | 89–90 | 90–91 | 91–92 | 92–93 | 93–94 |
|---|---|---|---|---|---|---|---|---|---|---|---|
| Olympics | | | | | 1st | | | | | | 1st |
| Worlds | | | 1st | 1st | 2nd | 1st | 1st | | | | |
| Europeans | | | 2nd | WD | 1st | | 1st | | | | 1st |
| Goodwill Games | | | | | | | 1st | | | | |
| Moscow News | | | 4th | | 1st | | | | | | |
| NHK Trophy | | | | | | | 1st | | | | |
| Skate Canada | | | 1st | 2nd | | | | | | | 1st |
International: Junior
| Junior Worlds | 5th | 1st | | | | | | | | | |
National
| Russian Champ. | | | | | | | | | | | 1st |
| Soviet Champ. | | 6th | 2nd | 1st | | | | | | | |
Professional
| World Pro. | | | | | | | 2nd | 1st | 1st | | 1st |
WD = Withdrew

== Publications ==
=== My Sergei: A Love Story ===
My Sergei: A Love Story was written by Gordeeva with Sports Illustrated writer E. M. Swift and published in 1996. Gordeeva's account of her years together with Grinkov topped the New York Times Best Seller list and includes many black-and-white and color photos from Gordeeva and Grinkov's personal collection, as well as publicity photos from their various touring groups, such as Stars On Ice. A made-for-television movie version of My Sergei was also made, directed by Rob Dustin. 2002 Olympic pairs skating champions Elena Berezhnaya and Anton Sikharulidze starred as Gordeeva and Grinkov respectively. It included interviews with family and friends and archival skating footage.

In 1999, a Russian language edition was published, which included a foreword absent in the English edition. In it, Gordeeva reveals she was approached by an American agency to write the book. This resulted in it being written "for an American reader who needs a sentimental, tragic and romantic story" and, because of Swift's preconceived notions of Russia, with a tendency "of praising the West and underlining imperfections of Russia."

=== A Letter for Daria ===
The children's book A Letter for Daria was written by Gordeeva for her daughter. It is an autobiographical letter from mother to daughter about childhood memories, skating, differences between Russian and American culture and the importance of family. It includes several pictures from Gordeeva's personal collection.
