= Kurt Browning =

Canadian figure skater and sports commentator

Kurt Browning CM
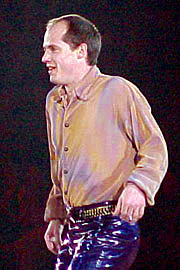
- Browning at the 2001 Stars on Ice

Personal information
- Born: June 18, 1966 (age 60) Rocky Mountain House, Alberta, Canada
- Height: 5 ft 7 in (170 cm)
- Spouses: Alissa Czisny (m. 2022); Sonia Rodriguez (m. 1996–2010)

Figure skating career
- Country: Canada
- Competitive: 1982–1994
- Professional: 1994–present
Medal record
Men's single skating
Representing Canada
World Championships
Gold medal – first place	1989 Paris	Men's singles
Gold medal – first place	1990 Halifax	Men's singles
Gold medal – first place	1991 Munich	Men's singles
Gold medal – first place	1993 Prague	Men's singles
Silver medal – second place	1992 Oakland	Men's singles
Canadian Championships
Gold medal – first place	1989 Chicoutimi	Men's singles
Gold medal – first place	1990 Sudbury	Men's singles
Gold medal – first place	1991 Saskatoon	Men's singles
Gold medal – first place	1993 Hamilton	Men's singles
Silver medal – second place	1987 Ottawa	Men's singles
Silver medal – second place	1988 Victoria	Men's singles
Silver medal – second place	1994 Edmonton	Men's singles

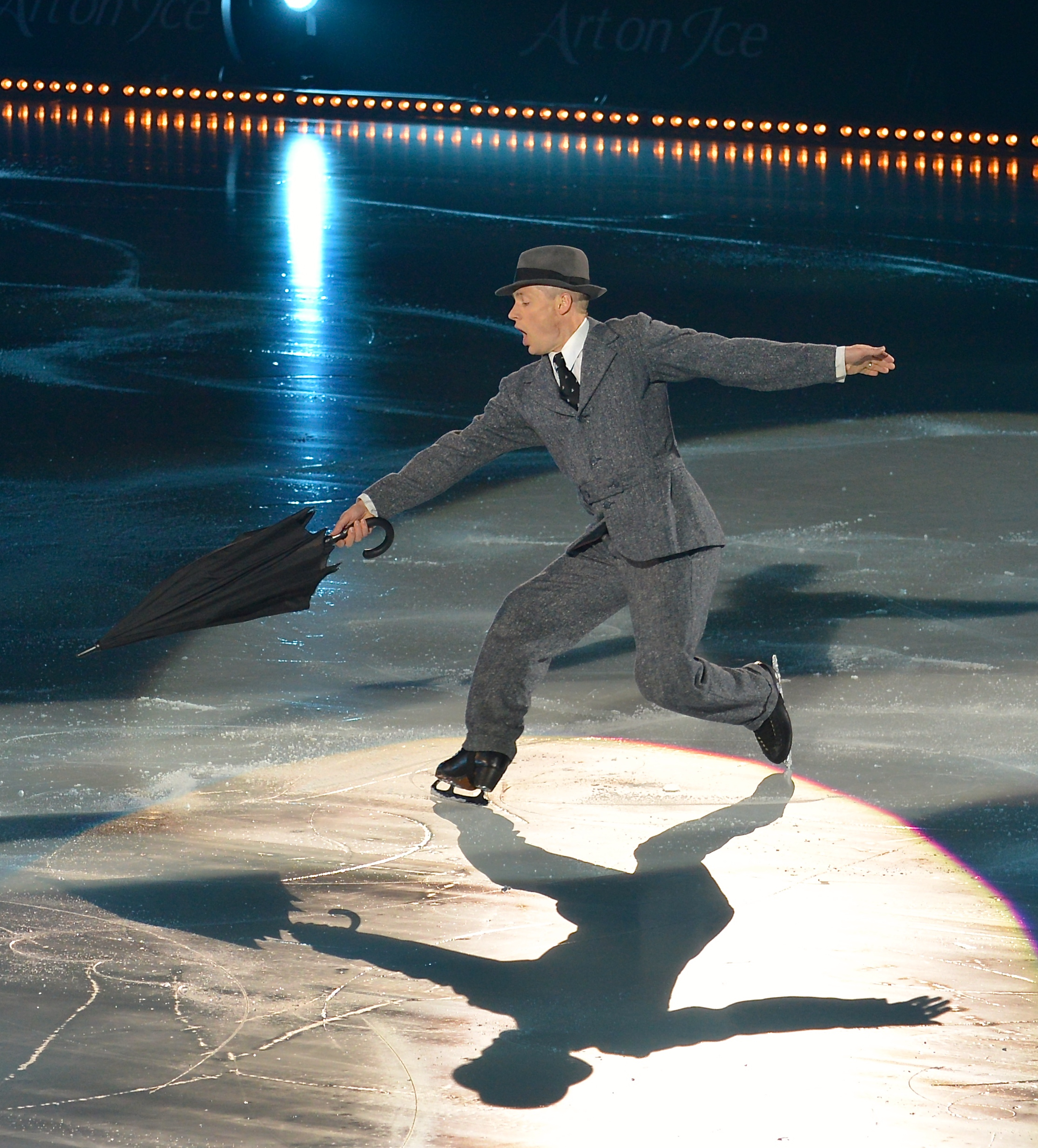
Browning performing "Singin' in the Rain" in Art on Ice 2014

Kurt Browning CM (born June 18, 1966) is a Canadian figure skater, choreographer and commentator. He is the first skater to land a ratified quadruple jump in competition. He is a four-time World Champion and Canadian national champion. He competed at three different Olympic Games.

== Career ==
Kurt Browning represented Canada in three Winter Olympics, 1988 (finishing 8th overall), 1992 (6th) and 1994 (5th). Browning won the Canadian novice championships in 1983 and was the Canadian junior champion in 1985. He was the senior champion of Canada four times and came in second place three times. He won the World Championships four times, in 1989, 1990, 1991, and 1993. He came in second place at Worlds in 1992 due to a severe back injury that "had a particularly negative effect on his Olympic bid". He came in fifth place at the 1994 Winter Olympics. He earned the privilege of carrying the Canadian flag during the opening ceremonies of the 1994 games in Lillehammer, Norway. Browning's other achievements include three Canadian Professional Championships and three World Professional Championships.

On March 25, 1988, at the 1988 World Championships in Budapest, Hungary, Browning landed the first ratified quadruple jump, a toe loop in the competition. This accomplishment is listed in the Guinness Book of Records. Jozef Sabovčík had previously landed a quad toe loop at the 1986 European Championships which was recognized at the event but then ruled invalid three weeks later. Browning later said, "I remember that there were a few people landing the jump (in practice) long before I did, and by watching them I was inspired to try it myself. After landing it, I certainly expected more skaters to start doing it in competition. I was surprised in the next few years when that really did not happen." Browning is also known for his intricate, fast, often lighthearted footwork. Browning has used percussive pop instrumentals in his programs; for example, he used "Bonzo's Montreux" by Led Zeppelin in 1993. He interpreted the music by punching his fists and frequently running across the ice. The following season he used "St. Louis Blues," wearing a tight black t-shirt, stretch pants, and belt. He also raised his fists "in a biceps-flexing muscle pose" and included humor by emulating laughter with upper body movements, skated in time to descending saxophone notes and by pointing to the audience during his footwork sequence.

As figure skating historian James R. Hines has stated, "Browning is remembered for outstanding interpretative programs". For example, Hines calls Browning's free skating program in 1993, set to music from the film Casablanca and choreographed by Sandra Bezic, "is most memorable". He portrayed Rick, Humphrey Bogart's character, and like Bogart, wore a white dinner jacket. One of Browning's iconic programs is "Singin' in the Rain", where he emulates Gene Kelly's dancing in the film. Choreographed by Bezic and debuted in a CBC-TV special in 1994, this program is still asked to be performed at ice shows after 20 years. He has also appeared in made-for-television films and toured with Stars on Ice.

As a commentator, Browning has made frequent appearances since turning professional in 1994. He has been a regular colour commentator for the CBC at major skating events since 2006.

Browning appeared in the 2006 Fox television program Skating with Celebrities. Starting in 2009, he was the co-host of Battle of the Blades.

As a choreographer, he has choreographed programs for many figure skaters including:

- Jeremy Abbott
- Kevin Alves
- Patrick Chan
- Vaughn Chipeur
- Marc-André Craig
- Alissa Czisny
- Javier Fernández
- Yuzuru Hanyu
- Takeshi Honda
- Brian Joubert
- Tuğba Karademir
- Carolina Kostner
- Takahiko Kozuka
- Tara Lipinski
- Evan Lysacek
- Brandon Mroz
- Lucinda Ruh
- Jamie Salé / David Pelletier
- Yuka Sato
- Tomáš Verner
- Yan Han

He also co-directed and choreographed the 2011–12 Stars on Ice tour.

== Awards and honors ==
Browning was awarded with a Lou Marsh Trophy for top Canadian Athlete (in 1990), Lionel Conacher Awards (1990 and 1991), an American Skating World Professional Skater of the Year Award (in 1998), and a Gustav Lussi Award from the Professional Skaters' Association (in 2001).

He was appointed a Member of the Order of Canada (CM) in 1989.

Browning was inducted into Canada's Sports Hall of Fame in 1994 and Skate Canada Hall of Fame in 2000. He was honored with a star on Canada's Walk of Fame in 2001. He was inducted into World Figure Skating Hall of Fame in 2006. He received the inaugural ISU Skating Lifetime Achievement Award in 2020.

== Personal life ==
Browning was born on June 18, 1966, in Rocky Mountain House, Alberta. He was raised in Caroline, Alberta.

He married Sonia Rodriguez, a principal dancer with the National Ballet of Canada, on June 30, 1996. Their first son, Gabriel, was born on July 12, 2003, and their second son, Dillon, was born on August 14, 2007. They subsequently divorced.

Browning's home in the Forest Hill area of Toronto suffered a fire on August 18, 2010.

He married Alissa Czisny on August 11, 2022.

== Competitive highlights ==
Competition placements at senior level
Season	1985–86	1986–87	1987–88	1988–89	1989–90	1990–91	1991–92	1992–93	1993–94
Winter Olympics			8th				6th		5th
Goodwill Games						1st			
World Championships		15th	6th	1st	1st	1st	2nd	1st	
Skate America	8th				3rd				
NHK Trophy		7th		3rd	3rd				
Skate Canada			4th	1st		1st			1st
Nations Cup						1st			
Int. de Paris							1st		
Nebelhorn Trophy	9th	3rd							
St. Gervais	2nd	2nd							
St. Ivel			2nd	1st					
Canadian Champ.	5th	2nd	2nd	1st	1st	1st		1st	2nd

- J – junior level, N – novice level

Competition placements at junior and novice level
Season	1982–83	1983–84	1984–85
La Coupe Excellence			5th
Canadian Champ.	12th N	1st N	1st J
