= Rob Dustin =

American television producer and director (1963)

- Born: Robert Dustin; February 24, 1963 (age 63); Des Moines, Iowa
- Education: University of Iowa
- Occupations: producer; director
- Years active: 1994–present

Robert Dustin, also known as Dusty, is an American Emmy awarded television producer and director. He is known for his work in television programs such as Halloween! (1994), My Sergi (1998) and Fire on Ice: Champions of American Figure Skating (2001).

== Early life and career ==
Rob Dustin graduated from the University of Iowa. He began his career working for CBS Sports, covering sports events and remained working there for 17 years until he founded Red Brick Entertainment in 1994. In 2007, when U.S. Figure Skating created an ice network the International Skating Union hired Dustin and Red Brick Entertainment for providing real TV production using multiple cameras. His team consisted of four crew members, to keep the cost down what Dustin calls “high-speed, low-drag approach”. In 2010, U.S. Figure Skating Championships, Dustin helped coordinate the coverage of the event. Dustin also is a longtime Coordinating producer in covering the ice skating championships in the Olympics.

== Filmography ==
Film
Year	Film	Notes
1994	Halloween!	Producer and director
1994	Ice Wars 1	Associate producer
1994	Artistry on Ice	Producer
1995	Too Hot to Skate	Producer
1995	Ice Wars 2	Associate producer
1995	Artistry on Ice II	Producer
1996	America's Choice: The Great Skate Debate	Producer
1996	Sergei Grinkov: Celebration of a Life	Producer
1997	Too Hot to Skate	Producer
1998	My Sergei	Producer and Director
1998	The Great Skate Debate II	Director
2001	Fire on Ice: Champions of American Figure Skating	Documentary - Producer and Director
Television
Year	Title	Notes
2005	The ChaseTrackdown	Director - Track Down
2006	Skating with Celebrities	Debut, Episode #1.2, Episode #1.2 - Co-executive producer (all episodes)

== Awards and honors ==
Rob Dustin has been nominated for and won the Sports Emmy Award numerous times.

Year	Award	Category	Work	Result	Ref
2013	Sports Emmy Award	Outstanding Live Event Turnaround	Games of the XXX Olympiad (NBC)	Won	
2015	Sports Emmy Award	Outstanding New Approaches – Sports Event Coverage	The XXII Olympic Winter Games	Won	
2017	Sports Emmy Award	Outstanding Trans - Media Sports Coverage	Games of the XXXI Olympiad	Won	
