= Elena Kvitchenko =

Personal information
- Native name: Елена Квитченко
- Other names: Elena Kvitchenko
- Born: c. 1967 (age 58–59)

Figure skating career
- Country: Soviet Union
- Partner: Rashid Kadyrkaev; Dmitriy Korneychenko
- Coach: Tamara Moskvina
- Retired: c. 1989

Elena Kvitchenko (Russian: Елена Квитченко; born c. 1967) is a former pair skater who represented the Soviet Union. With Rashid Kadyrkaev, she is the 1986 Prize of Moscow News champion, the 1987 Winter Universiade champion, the 1987 Skate Canada International silver medalist, and a three-time Soviet national bronze medalist.

Kvitchenko/Kadyrkaev were coached by Tamara Moskvina. After retiring from competition, the pair toured with Dorothy Hamill's Ice Capades.

== Competitive highlights ==
With Kadyrkaev

International
Event	1985–86	1986–87	1987–88	1988–89
World Championships				6th
European Championships				4th
Skate Canada		4th	2nd	
Prize of Moscow News	5th	1st	5th	4th
Winter Universiade		1st		
National
Soviet Championships	4th	3rd	3rd	3rd
Spartakiada	1st			
USSR Cup	1st			2nd
