= Lisa Sargeant =

Canadian figure skater

Personal information
- Other names: Lisa Sargeant-Driscoll
- Born: January 8, 1971 (age 55)

Figure skating career
- Country: Canada
- Skating club: The Strathmore Skate Club

Lisa Lynn Sargeant-Driscoll (born January 8, 1971) is a Canadian former competitive figure skater. She is the 1990 Skate Canada International silver medallist, 1991 Piruetten champion, and 1990 Canadian national champion. She placed 6th at the 1990 World Championships and 18th the following year.

Sargeant works as a coach and choreographer in Calgary. She is the elder sister of Kristy Sargeant, a former pair skater for Canada.

== Results ==
International
Event	88–89	89–90	90–91	91–92	92–93	93–94
World Champ.		6th	18th			
Skate Canada		6th	2nd			
Skate America		10th			4th	
International de Paris						3rd
Piruetten				1st		
Skate Electric			2nd			
National
Canadian Champ.	3rd	1st	2nd	4th	5th	6th
