= Beatrice Gelmini =

Italian former competitive figure skater (born 1966)

Personal information
- Born: 28 October 1966 (age 59)

Figure skating career
- Country: Italy
- Retired: 1991

Beatrice Gelmini (born 28 October 1966) is an Italian former competitive figure skater. She won four Italian national titles and represented Italy at the 1988 Winter Olympics in Calgary, finishing 11th. She competed at multiple European and World Championships, achieving her best result, ninth, at the 1989 World Championships in Paris. After retiring from competition, she became a coach in Aosta.

== Competitive highlights ==
International
Event	84–85	85–86	86–87	87–88	88–89	89–90	90–91
Olympics				11th			
Worlds		21st	17th	15th	9th	13th	24th
Europeans	19th	19th	16th	13th		12th	
NHK Trophy					8th		9th
Skate America						10th	13th
Skate Canada							12th
National
Italian Championships	2nd	1st	1st	1st	2nd	1st	2nd
