= Massimo Salvadè =

Italian figure skater (born 1971)

Personal information
- Nationality: Italian
- Born: 29 August 1971 (age 53); Como, Italy

Sport
- Sport: Figure skating

Massimo Salvadè (born 29 August 1971) is an Italian figure skater. He competed in the pairs event at the 1992 Winter Olympics with Anna Tabacchi.

== Results ==
Masssimo Salvadè had the following placements at major international championships:

Pairs:

- 1991 World Championships (17th);
- 1992 World Championships (15th);
- 1991 European Championships (12th);
- 1992 European Championships (11th).
