= Anna Tabacchi =

Italian figure skater

Personal information
- Nationality: Italian
- Born: 27 July 1976 (age 48); Pieve di Cadore, Italy

Sport
- Sport: Figure skating

Anna Tabacchi (born 27 July 1976) is an Italian former figure skater. She competed in the pairs event at the 1992 Winter Olympics with Massimo Salvadè.

Anna Tabacchi had the following placements at major international championships:

- Pairs: 1991 World Championships (17th);
- 1992 World Championships (15th);
- 1991 European Championships (12th);
- 1992 European Championships (11th).
