= Jan Erik Digernes =

Norwegian figure skater

Figure skating career
- Country: Norway
- Retired: 1995

Jan Erik Digernes is a Norwegian former competitive figure skater. He is a three-time Norwegian national champion and competed at multiple European and World Championships. His best placement was 16th at the 1991 European Championships.

Digernes withdrew from the 1992 Winter Olympics in Albertville, France. Prior to the 1994 Winter Olympics in Lillehammer, the Norwegian Olympic Committee announced that skaters aspiring to be selected for Norway would have to finish in the top 12 at the European or World Championships. No skaters were successful, leading Norway to give up its figure skating spots which the host country had received automatically.

== Competitive highlights ==
International
Event	88–89	89–90	90–91	91–92	92–93	93–94	94–95
Winter Olympics				WD			
World Champ.		25th	24th	24th	23rd		27th
European Champ.	18th	26th	16th	18th	19th	23rd	23rd
Skate Canada				10th			
Piruetten		3rd					
Nordics			3rd	2nd			
National
Norwegian Champ.	1st	1st			1st		
WD = Withdrew
