= Lily Lyoonjung Lee =

South Korean-American figure skater (born 1969)

Personal information
- Other names: Lily Lee
- Born: September 26, 1969 (age 56) Seoul, South Korea
- Home town: Alexandria, Virginia, U.S.
- Height: 5 ft 4 in (1.62 m)

Figure skating career
- Country: South Korea
- Retired: 1994

- Lily Lyoonjung Lee
- Hangul: 이윤정
- RR: I Yunjeong
- MR: I Yunjŏng

Lily Lyoonjung Lee (born September 26, 1969) is a Korean-American former competitive figure skater. She represented South Korea at the 1994 Winter Olympics.

== Personal life ==
Born in Seoul, South Korea, Lily Lee moved to the United States as a child and was raised in Alexandria, Virginia. She holds dual citizenship.

== Career ==
Lee was coached by Kathy Casey in Colorado Springs, Colorado. In the 1980s, she competed on the national level in the United States, winning the 1987 Eastern Sectionals and qualifying several times for the U.S. Figure Skating Championships.

Toward the end of the 1980s, Lee began appearing internationally for South Korea while still living and training in the United States. She won the bronze medal at the 1989 Golden Spin of Zagreb and competed at six World Championships, achieving her best result, 17th, in 1990. She was selected to represent South Korea at the 1994 Winter Olympics and finished 21st. She received special media attention for being in the same practice group as Nancy Kerrigan and Tonya Harding.

== Results ==
International
Event	1988–89	1989–90	1990–91	1991–92	1992–93	1993–94
Winter Olympics						21st
World Champ.	22nd	17th	20th	18th	27th	31st
NHK Trophy		14th		15th		
Golden Spin		3rd				
Piruetten				3rd		
National
South Korean						
