= Hélène Persson =

Swedish figure skater

Personal information
- Full name: Eva Hélène Linnéa Persson
- Born: 9 December 1966 (age 59) Stockholm, Sweden
- Height: 1.62 m (5 ft 4 in)

Figure skating career
- Country: Sweden
- Retired: 1992

Eva Hélène Linnéa Persson (born 9 December 1966) is a Swedish former competitive figure skater. She is a three-time Nordic champion and a five-time Swedish national champion. Her best result at an ISU Championship was 11th at the 1990 European Championships. Persson was selected to represent Sweden at the 1992 Winter Olympics in Albertville, France. She placed 24th in the short program and then withdrew.

== Competitive highlights ==
International
| Event | 86–87 | 87–88 | 88–89 | 89–90 | 90–91 | 91–92 |
|---|---|---|---|---|---|---|
| Winter Olympics | | | | | | WD |
| World Champ. | 21st | | 19th | 19th | 25th | 22nd |
| European Champ. | 13th | | 14th | 11th | 14th | 18th |
| International de Paris | | 8th | | | | |
| NHK Trophy | | | | | 10th | |
| Skate Canada | | | | | 9th | |
| Nordics | | 1st | 1st | | 1st | |
National
| Swedish Champ. | 1st | 2nd | 1st | 1st | 1st | 1st |
WD = Withdrew
