= Anuschka Gläser =

German former pair skater (born 1969)

Personal information
- Born: 19 August 1969 (age 56) Stuttgart, Germany

Figure skating career
- Country: Germany

Anuschka Gläser (born 19 August 1969) is a German former pair skater. She is a three-time German national champion, twice with Stefan Pfrengle and once with Axel Rauschenbach. Gläser and Rauschenbach represented Germany at the 1994 Winter Olympics.

== Results ==
=== With Axel Rauschenbach ===
International
Event	1993–94 (GER)
Winter Olympics	13th
World Championships	14th
European Championships	10th
Skate America	7th
Nations Cup	5th
National
German Championships	1st

=== With Stefan Pfrengle ===
International
Event	87–88 (FRG)	88–89 (FRG)	89–90 (FRG)	90–91 (GER)	91–92 (GER)
World Championships	13th	9th	12th	12th	13th
European Championships	9th	6th	5th	6th	7th
International de Paris		5th			6th
Skate America		8th			
Skate Canada			7th		7th
National
German Championships	2nd	1st	1st	3rd	3rd
