= Mirko Eichhorn =

German figure skater

Personal information
- Born: 30 August 1971 (age 54) East Berlin, East Germany

Figure skating career
- Country: Germany; East Germany
- Retired: 1996

Mirko Eichhorn (born 30 August 1971) is a former German figure skater. He won two national titles, East German in 1989 and German in 1992. He competed at four World Championships and four European Championships. His best result was seventh at the 1991 European Championships.

== Competitive highlights ==
International
Event	86–87 (GDR)	87–88 (GDR)	88–89 (GDR)	89–90 (GDR)	90–91 (GER)	91–92 (GER)	92–93 (GER)	93–94 (GER)	94–95 (GER)	95–96 (GER)
Worlds			16th	21st	15th	15th				
Europeans					7th	13th		16th	19th	
GP Nations Cup										11th
Internat. Paris								9th		
Nations Cup						2nd				
Skate America						8th				
Prague Skate				3rd						
Skate Israel										11th
International: Junior
Junior Worlds			5th	5th						
Blue Swords				1st J						
National
German					2nd	1st	WD	2nd	3rd	
East German	4th	3rd	1st	2nd						
GP = Champions Series; J = Junior level; WD = Withdrew
