= Promenade (shopping centre) =

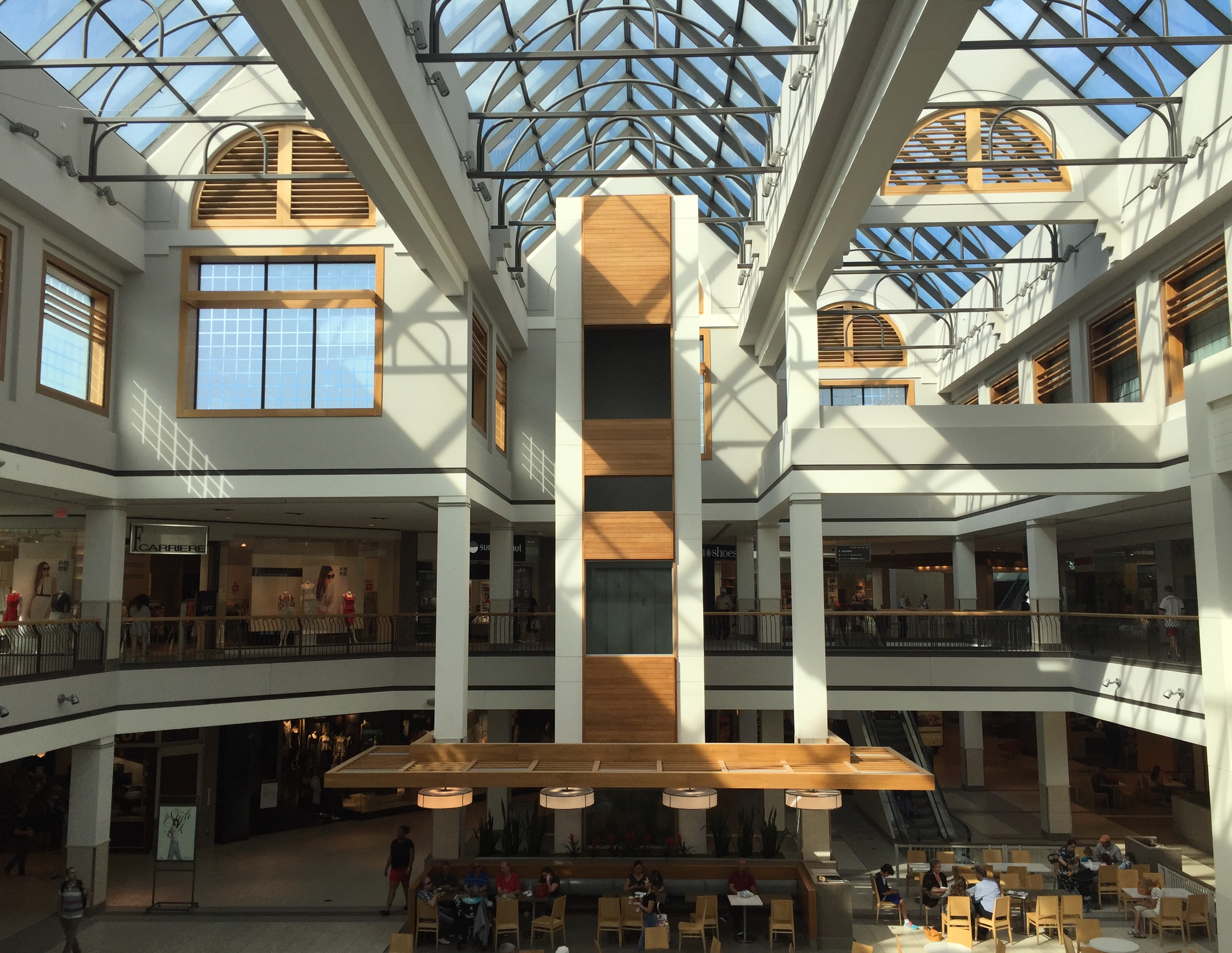
- The interior of the shopping centre
- Location: Vaughan, Ontario, Canada
- Coordinates: 43°48′24.17″N 79°27′8.86″W
- Address: Bathurst Street and Centre Street
- Opened: August 4, 1986
- Developer: Cadillac Fairview
- Owner: Promenade General Partner Inc.
- Num. of stores: 150+
- Num. of anchor tenants: 2
- Floor area: 879,000 sq ft (81,700 m^{2})
- Floors: 3
- Parking: Outdoor
- Website: www.promenade.ca

Promenade, officially Promenade Shopping Centre or Promenade Mall, is a major shopping centre located in Vaughan, Ontario, Canada. The mall has over 150 tenants, and is anchored by T&T Supermarket and Imagine Cinemas. In late 2024 a second supermarket The Olive Branch opened offering a full selection of kosher food.

== History ==
The mall opened in 1986 and became York Region's fourth indoor shopping mall after Hillcrest Mall in Richmond Hill (completed 1974), Upper Canada Mall in Newmarket (completed 1974) and Markville Shopping Centre (completed 1982). The mall's first tenants included Sears Canada and Eaton's.

In February 2016, the mall's owner Cadillac Fairview announced that it had put the Promenade up for sale. As of April 20, 2017, Promenade Shopping Centre was purchased by Promenade General Partner Inc., a business formed by the Serruya family and Liberty Development Corporation. Centrecorp Management Services Limited, leading property management and real estate services company, has been retained to manage Promenade Shopping Centre.

In 2017, the mall had one of the last Sears Canada stores when the entire chain went bankrupt, with Sears accounting for 20% of the mall's space. Bobby's Liquidation occupied the Sears location from 2019 to 2020. The mall owners have submitted an extensive redevelopment plan to the City of Vaughan, including a major renovation, the addition of several condominium towers, and a mixed-use office/hotel skyscraper using the existing parking lots.

The site is currently in phase one of being re-developed by Liberty Developments. There will be three condo towers called Promenade Park Towers. The first two condos will be located at 1 Promenade Circle, Thornhill, consisting of 748 units in the two 30 and 35 storeys tower.

== Transportation ==
The mall is located at the intersection of Bathurst Street and Centre Street in the Thornhill district of Vaughan, south of Highway 407 and Highway 7.

=== Public transit ===
Promenade Terminal
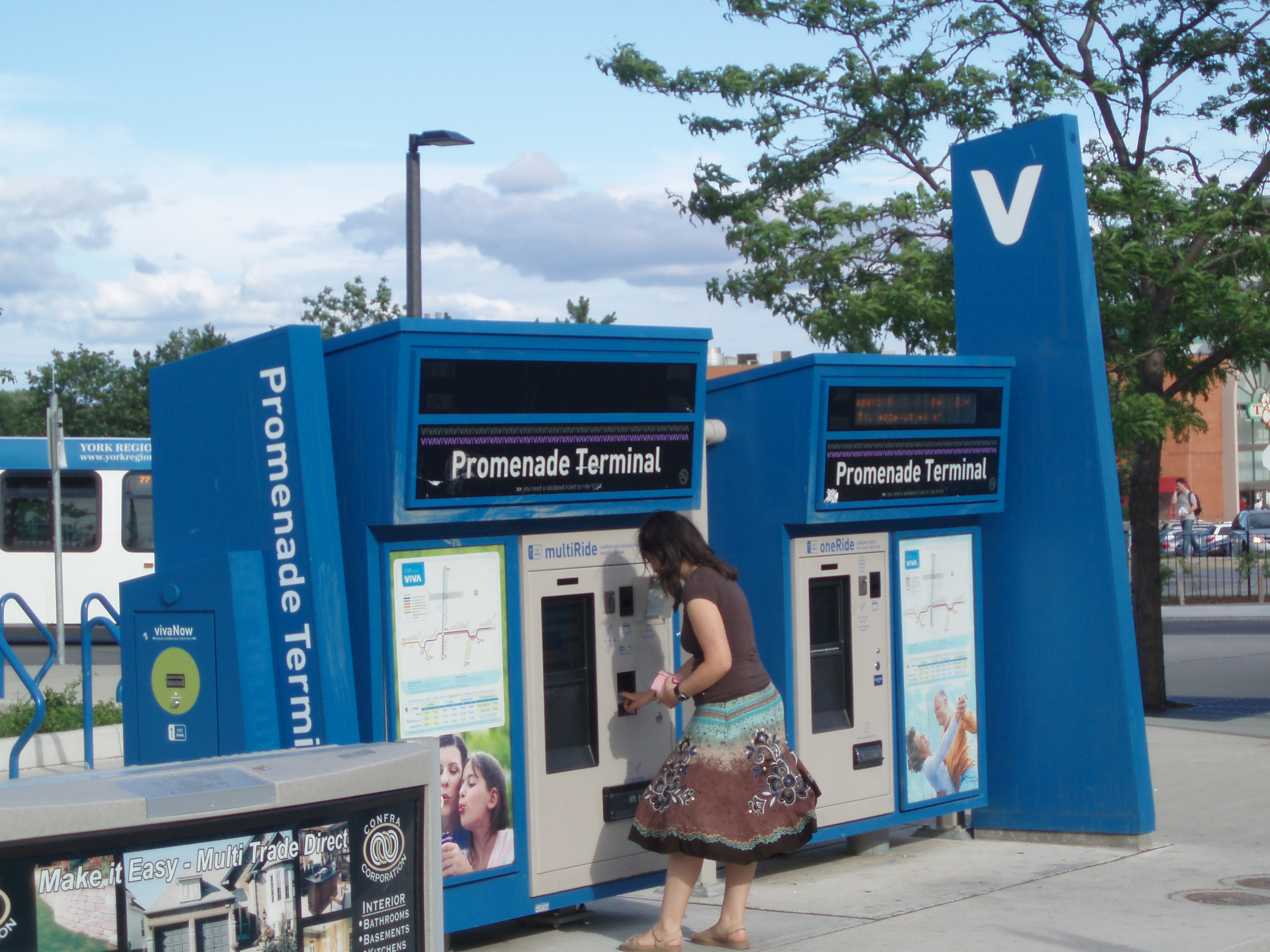

General information
- Location: 1 Promenade Circle, Vaughan, ON
- Owner: York Region Transit
- Bus routes: 6
- Bus stands: 8
- Bus operators: York Region Transit; TTC bus routes

Construction
- Accessible: yes

History
- Opened: 1986
- Rebuilt: September 4, 2005
Location

Promenade Terminal is a York Region Transit (YRT) (which includes Viva bus rapid transit services) terminal adjacent to the mall. It is in a fenced-off parking lot at 1 Promenade Circle, at the intersection of North Promenade and Centre Street. The City of Vaughan currently owns the property, which is leased to York Region for a nominal sum, with the responsibility for public transit now belonging to the Region. The Promenade Terminal has service connecting to Finch and Vaughan Metropolitan Centre subway stations.

In the summer of 2005, Promenade Terminal was temporarily closed so that renovations could be made. Bus stops were temporarily moved just beyond the station to North Promenade and Centre Street. Reconstruction of the terminal included newly cemented platforms, modern and lit bus shelters, new and brighter lighting, and the installation of a Viva OneRide ticket machine. The project was completed over one month, with the station reopening in August 2005. More recently, a Viva multiRide machine has been added in the terminal to go along with the oneRide machine.

Toronto Transit Commission (TTC) bus routes also connect to this terminal. The Viva Orange stop is located just north of the terminal, in the median of Centre Street (along the Highway 7 Rapidway).
