= Queen Street Viaduct =

Road bridge in Toronto, Canada

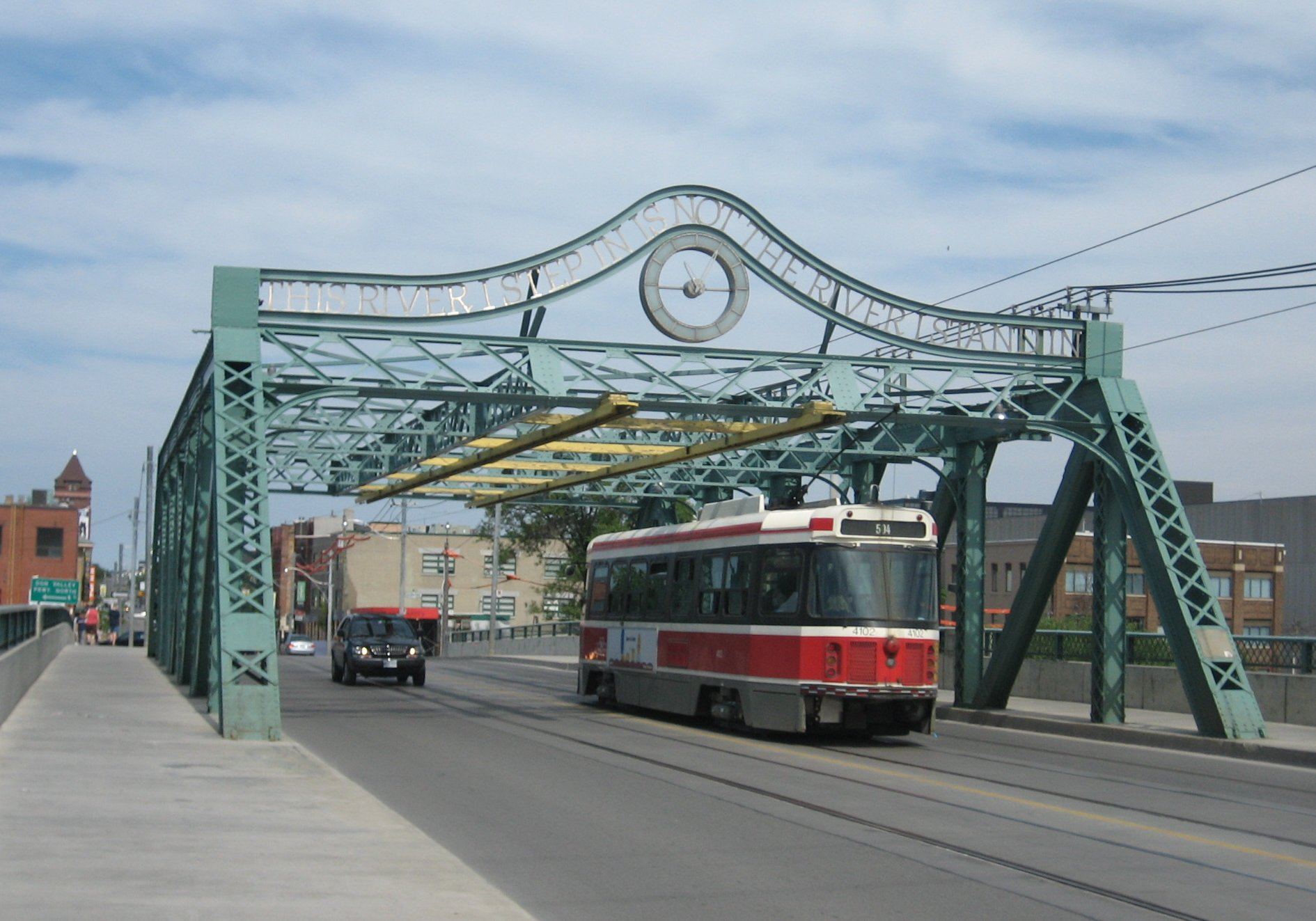
- Coordinates: 43°39′29″N 79°21′14″W
- Carries: 4 lanes vehicular traffic including double streetcar tracks and pedestrian sidewalk on north and south sides
- Crosses: Don River
- Maintained by: Toronto Transportation Services, Toronto Transit Commission

Characteristics
- Material: Steel and concrete
- Total length: ~39.3 metres (129 ft)
- No. of spans: 1
- Clearance below: Don River and Don Valley Parkway

History
- Constructed by: Cleveland Bridge & Engineering Company
- Construction start: 1910
- Construction end: 1911
- Opened: 1911

Location
- Interactive map of Queen Street Viaduct

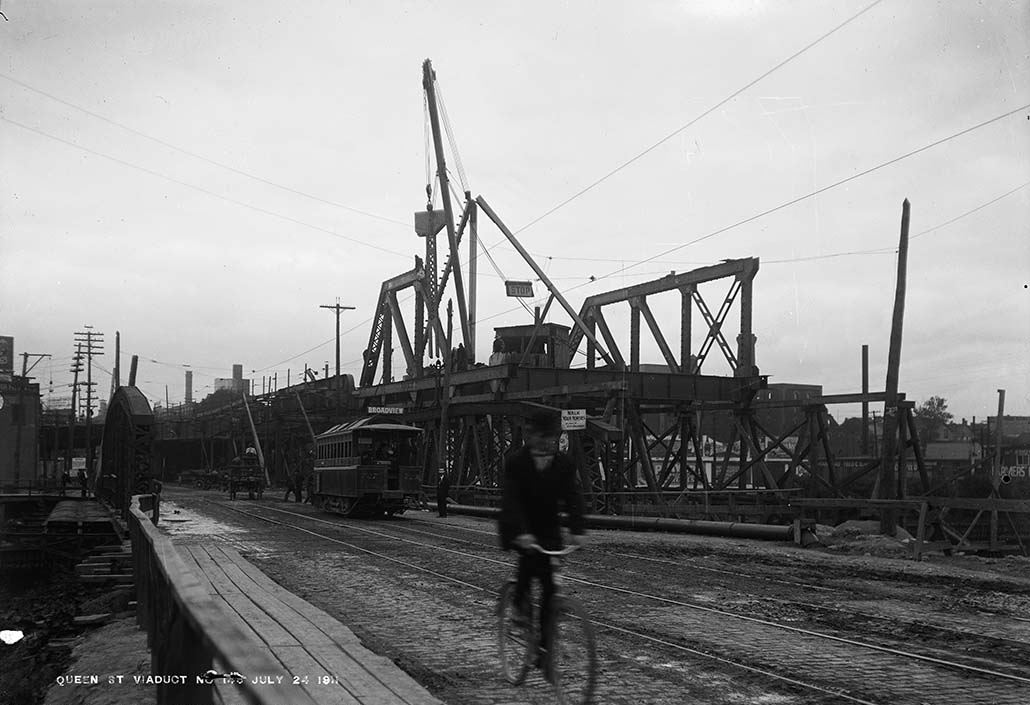
The bridge under construction in 1911

The Queen Street Viaduct (usually known as the Queen Street Bridge) in Toronto, Canada carries vehicles and Toronto Transit Commission streetcars along Queen Street East and across the Don River. It is an example of a Pratt truss.

== History ==
The viaduct is at least the third bridge over the Don River at this location, the first operated by the Scadding family in the early 1800s (One of the early bridges was a wooden bridge built in 1803.) The previous bridges were closer to the level of the river bank below. The bridge prior to the 1910 bridge was a warren truss bridge and was shifted over during the transition work.

The Board of Railway Commissioners authorized the construction of the third, current bridge in 1909 because of safety concerns. The new bridge would eliminate a busy grade-level railway crossing on the west bank of the river, used by the Canadian Pacific Railway, Grand Trunk Railway and the Canadian Northern Railway. There was also a concern that streetcars were becoming too heavy for the second bridge.

The current steel Truss bridge was built in 1911 by Cleveland Bridge & Engineering Company of Darlington, England. It was higher in elevation than previous bridges at the location and streets on each side of the river were graded higher to meet the level of the bridge. To make room for the new bridge, the old one was shifted to the south to carry road traffic during construction. The bridge was opened for streetcars on 8 October 1911, and for other road traffic 5 days later.

The bridge was renovated in the 1990s and public art was added. At the top of the western side of the bridge is a piece of public art created in 1996 by Eldon Garnet.

The bridge is one of a few steel Truss bridges in the city:

- Old Eastern Avenue Bridge – unused bridge crossing the Don River
- Sir Isaac Brock Bridge – recycled bridge carrying Bathurst Street over the railways
- Tywn River Drive Bridge – a minor bridge crossing the Rouge River
- Lawrence Avenue Bridge – former bridge that took traffic over Don River replaced by current overpass in the 1960s
- The Dowling Avenue steel bridge was replaced with a steel truss pedestrian bridge.

== Public art ==
The artwork on the bridge by Eldon Garnet consisted of a clock, which ceased to work and the mechanism and hands were removed in 2010. The phrase "this river I step in is not the river I stand in", taken from the philosophy of Heraclitus, is inscribed in large letters overarching the road. The bridge art is one part of a three-site art piece, with the second part as words inscribed on the pavement at the intersections of Broadview Avenue and Queen Street, and the last part as four metal "banners" at Queen and De Grassi Street.
