= Sir Isaac Brock Bridge =

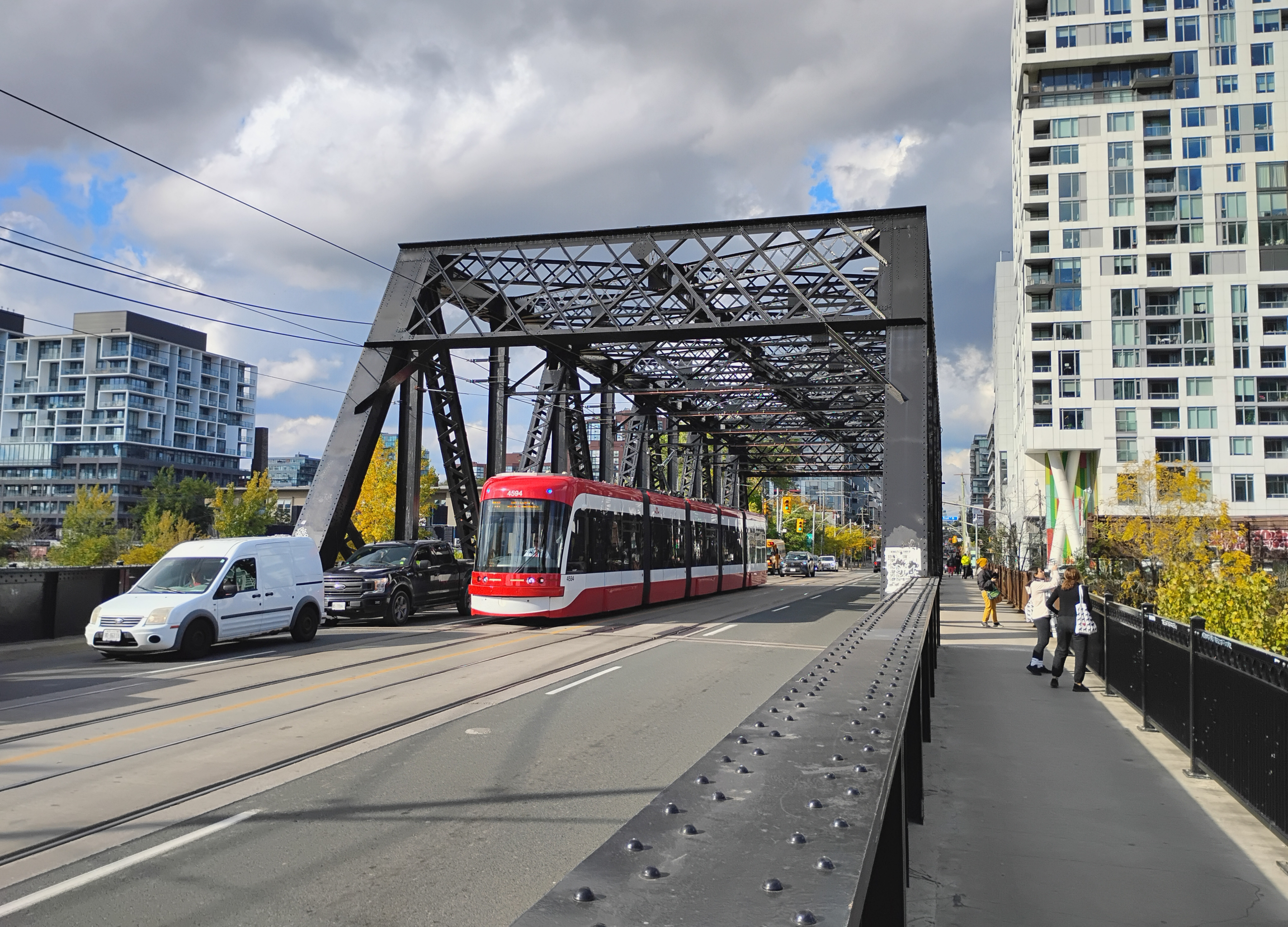
- Coordinates: 43°38′25″N 79°24′05″W
- Carries: Bathurst Street
- Crosses: Metrolinx GO Transit lines
- Locale: Toronto, Canada
- Other name: Bathurst Street Bridge
- Named for: Sir Isaac Brock
- Owner: Metrolinx

Characteristics
- Design: Warren truss bridge
- Material: Steel
- Total length: 600 feet (180 m)
- Longest span: 205 feet (62 m)
- No. of spans: 1 main, 8 approach
- No. of lanes: 4

Rail characteristics
- No. of tracks: 2

History
- Built: 1903
- Rebuilt: 1931

Location
- Interactive map of Sir Isaac Brock Bridge

The Sir Isaac Brock Bridge is a steel Warren truss bridge in Toronto, Ontario, Canada. It carries Bathurst Street over the Union Station Rail Corridor between Front Street and Fort York Boulevard. The bridge carries four lanes for motor vehicles with the centre lanes containing the streetcar tracks of the Toronto Transit Commission's 511 Bathurst streetcar route.

The Bridge was formerly named The Bathurst Street Bridge before changing names and being named after Isaac Brock.

== Description and history ==
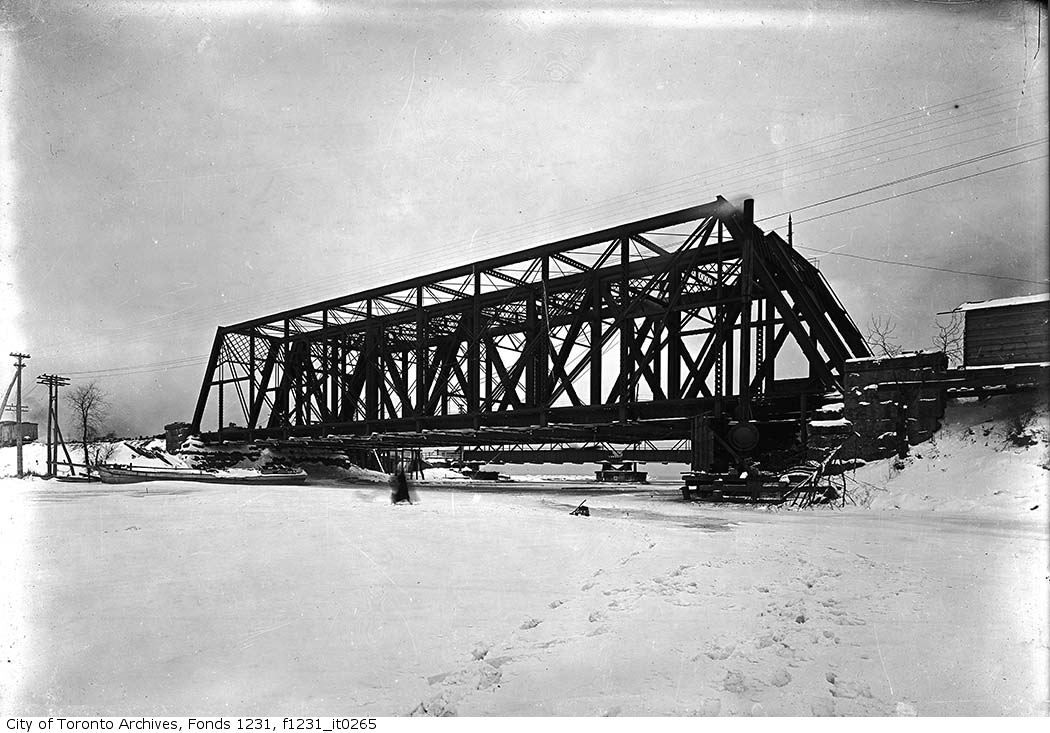
Sir Isaac Brock Bridge over the Humber River in Toronto, 1910

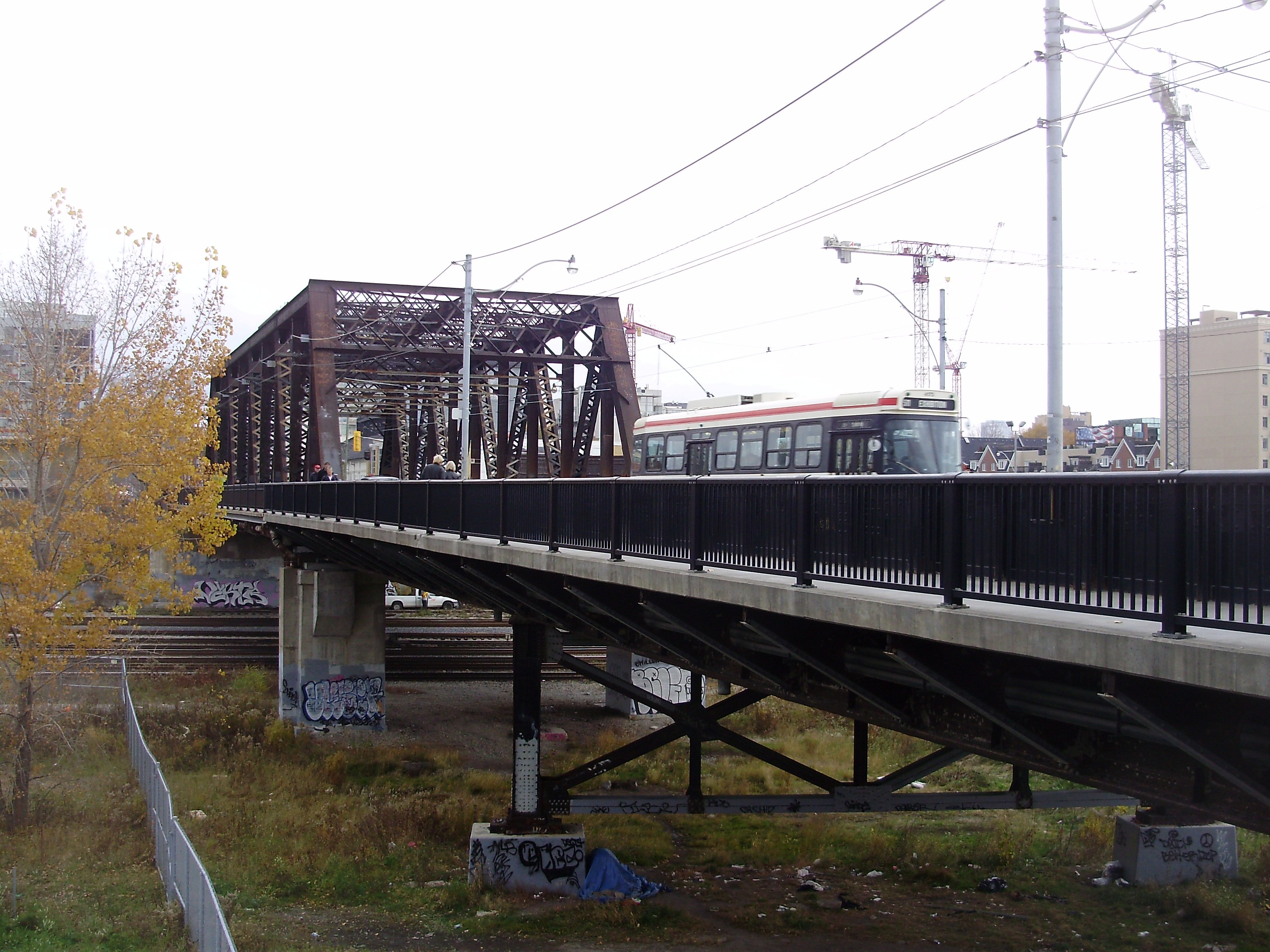
A CLRV streetcar travels south over the bridge in 2008.

The steel truss bridge was built in 1903 and used for the Great Western Railway over the Humber River (northside of then-Lakeshore Road at mouth of the river). It was disassembled and relocated in 1916 to Bathurst Street and converted for road traffic. The bridge served to connect Bathurst Street at Front Street to Fort York.

In 1931, the bridge was moved and realigned (Bathurst Street was at an angle south of Front Street) to support streetcar service south of the railway tracks at that location. A new bridge south of the bridge was constructed to connect the south end of the bridge, connecting Bathurst to Fleet Street. Fort York lost its road access in the change, and a footbridge to the east entrance was constructed.The Tywn River Drive Bridge, Queen Street Viaduct, and the Old Eastern Avenue Bridge are other examples of steel bridges in Toronto. Lawrence Avenue Bridge was a truss bridge that took traffic over Don River, but it was replaced by the current overpass over the Don River and Don Valley Parkway in the 1960s.

In 2007, the bridge was given the official name of the "Sir Isaac Brock Bridge" by the City of Toronto. This was done at the instigation of the "Friends of Fort York" organization.

The bridge is owned by Metrolinx, which owns the railway tracks below. It was formerly owned by the Canadian National Railway.

From May until late-December 2020, the bridge was closed for rehabilitation work. Crews made steel and concrete repairs to the road-carrying spans and the exposed steel, replaced TTC streetcar tracks and overhead wiring, and constructed a new concrete parapet wall along the curb for improved safety.
