= Paul Raff =

Canadian architect and artist

- Born: Paul Raff; Montreal, Quebec, Canada
- Education: University of Waterloo
- Occupation: Architect
- Practice: Paul Raff Studios
- Website: paulraffstudio.com//

Paul Raff is a Canadian architect and artist. His practice, Paul Raff Studio, is located in Toronto, Ontario.

== Early life ==
Raff was born in Montreal and his family moved to Saskatoon, Saskatchewan. He spent much of his childhood in the Canadian Prairies.

Raff graduated from the University of Waterloo and began his career at architectural firms in New York, Barcelona and Hong Kong.

== Work ==
Raff's early work included a design for the redevelopment of Toronto's waterfront. Since establishing Paul Raff Studio, Raff has designed many private residences and public artworks such as at Vaughan Metropolitan Centre station in Toronto.

== Awards ==
Raff was awarded the Allied Arts Medal by the Royal Architectural Institute of Canada and the Allied Arts Award for lifetime achievement by the Ontario Association of Architects.
