= Viva Orange =

Bus rapid transit line in York Region, Ontario

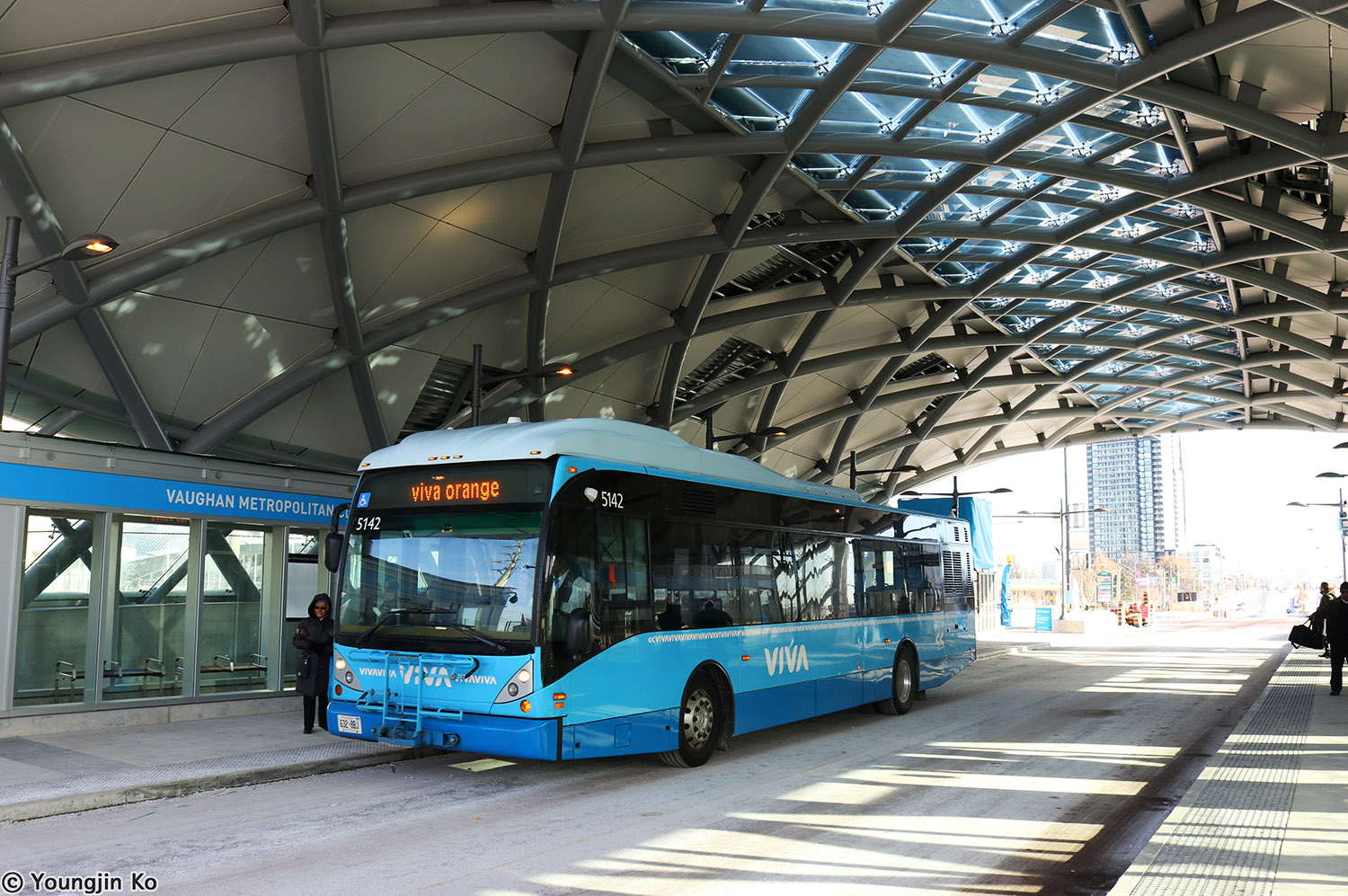

Overview
- System: YRT/Viva
- Operator: Miller Transit
- Vehicle: Van Hool A330, Nova Bus LFS Artic, New Flyer XD60
- Began service: October 16, 2005 (original route); December 17, 2017 (current alignment)

Route
- Route type: Bus rapid transit
- Locale: York Region
- Communities served: Vaughan; Richmond Hill
- Start: Martin Grove
- Via: Vaughan Metropolitan Centre
- End: Richmond Hill Centre Terminal
- Length: 19.8 kilometres (12.3 mi)
- Stops: 17
- Other routes: 501 Züm Queen

Service
- Ridership: 5,872 - Weekday, January 2025

Viva Orange is a line on the Viva bus rapid transit system in York Region, Ontario, Canada. The route primarily runs in an east–west direction along the Highway 7 Rapidway in Vaughan. It is operated by Tok Transit under contract from York Region.

== Route description ==
Viva Orange runs mostly along Highway 7, between Martin Grove Road and Richmond Hill Centre Terminal on Yonge Street. A section of the route also runs on Centre Street and Bathurst Street to service the Promenade Terminal. The route connects with the Toronto subway's Line 1 Yonge–University at Vaughan Metropolitan Centre station.

There are 17 stations currently in operation.

Viva Orange
Name	Opening date	Municipality	Major connections
Highway 50	TBD	Vaughan	501
Highway 427	TBD	Vaughan	501
Highway 27	TBD	Vaughan	501
Martin Grove	October 16, 2005	Vaughan	501
Kipling	October 16, 2005	Vaughan	501
Islington	October 16, 2005	Vaughan	501
Wigwoss–Helen	November 24, 2019	Vaughan	501
Pine Valley	October 16, 2005	Vaughan	501
Ansley Grove	October 16, 2005	Vaughan	501
Weston	October 16, 2005	Vaughan	501
Commerce	November 24, 2019	Vaughan	501
Vaughan	December 17, 2017	Vaughan	501
Creditstone	December 17, 2017	Vaughan	
Keele	December 17, 2017	Vaughan	
Dufferin	December 17, 2017	Vaughan	
Taiga	January 5, 2020	Vaughan	
Disera–Promenade	December 17, 2017	Vaughan	
Atkinson	December 17, 2017	Vaughan	
Bathurst	September 22, 2019	Vaughan	
Richmond Hill Centre	December 17, 2017	Richmond Hill	Langstaff GO

== Transit system integration ==
=== Brampton Transit ===
Viva Orange shares routing with Brampton Transit's 501 Züm Queen express bus route between Martin Grove and Vaughan Metropolitan Centre (VMC), and has been fare integrated with it since its creation in September 2010. Both Brampton Transit and York Region Transit proofs of payment are accepted for the entire length of both bus routes.

=== Toronto Transit Commission (TTC) ===
Viva Orange connects with the TTC subway at VMC station. There are currently free transfers between TTC and YRT routes for customers paying by Presto card.

== Route changes ==
Viva Orange originally began service on October 16, 2005 and operated between Martin Grove Road on Highway 7 and Sheppard West subway station via York University. On December 17, 2017 the Line 1 Yonge–University extension opened and replaced service between Sheppard West and Highway 7. Viva Orange's eastern terminus was relocated to the Richmond Hill Centre Terminal to coincide with the subway's opening.

=== Future ===
There are plans to extend the western terminus to Highway 50 with additional stops at Highway 427 and Highway 27. There are also plans to add an additional branch at the eastern terminus between Promenade Terminal and Finch station.

== Rapidway ==
Viva Orange operates along dedicated right of way (dubbed Rapidways) between Wigwoss–Helen and Richmond Hill Centre Terminal. Eventually, the entire Highway 7 Corridor could be upgraded to light rail transit.

== See also ==
- 501 Züm Queen
- Viva Purple
