= Old Eastern Avenue Bridge =

Bridge in Ontario, Canada

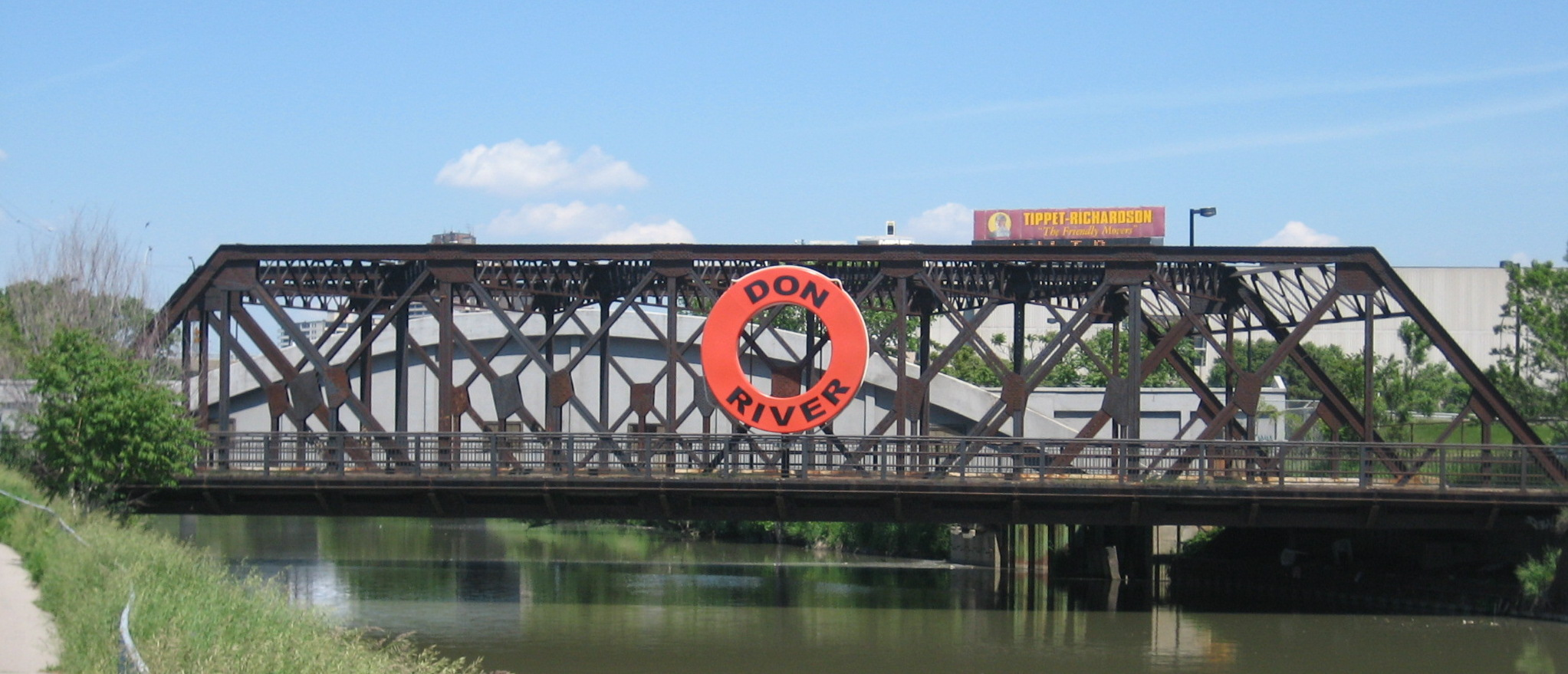
- The southern side of the bridge
- Coordinates: 43.655577°N 79.351762°W
- Carries: Unused/Access closed off - 2 lane roadway and sidewalks
- Crosses: Don River
- Maintained by: Toronto Transportation Services; Enbridge (gas bridge only)

Characteristics
- Material: Steel and concrete
- Total length: ~45 metres (148 ft)
- Width: ~19 metres (62 ft)
- No. of spans: 1

Location
- Interactive map of Old Eastern Avenue Bridge

The Old Eastern Avenue Bridge (also known erroneously as the King Street Bridge) consisted of two bridges spanning the Don River in Toronto, Ontario, Canada. The north bridge or Gas Line Bridge was a concrete arch bridge built for Consumer's Gas Company and is used by Enbridge Gas to carry a major gas main. The southern Howe truss bridge, similar to Queen Street Viaduct and Sir Isaac Brock Bridge, previously carried traffic on Eastern Avenue, has been out of service since 1965 and it was dismantled in 2024.

== History ==
The southern bridge was built in 1933 replacing an older wooden bridge that had been damaged by ice on the Don River in 1900. The original cost was $70,864.07.

=== Out of service ===
The bridge was closed off in 1965 after the construction of the Don Valley Parkway. Eastern's east and west halves crossed the Don River north of the old alignment via a new large viaduct with ramps connecting to the Don Valley Parkway, and this viaduct (known as the Eastern Avenue Bypass in some maps) forked out and become the eastern terminus of both Richmond and Adelaide streets. With the Eastern Avenue Bypass just to the north and the elevated Gardiner Expressway just to the south, it was decided that the existing Eastern Avenue bridge was unnecessary at that point on the Don River. The bridge was thus disconnected from the road network, and also fenced in to block pedestrians as the Don Valley Parkway and the rail lines are both considered hazardous. The city initially considered demolishing the unused southern bridge at the time, but found that it would be more expensive than simply maintaining it, and continued to inspect the bridge for decades.

=== Removal ===
A structural assessment in 2022 determined the southern bridge was in poor condition and at risk of failing. While it was listed by the City of Toronto, the bridge did not meet the criteria for heritage designation under the Ontario Heritage Act. Dismantling of the bridge took place between September and October of 2024, citing safety reasons. The bridge was deemed unsafe and removal required for East Harbour Transit Hub project.
