= Highway 7 Rapidway =

Bus transit right-of-way in York Region, Canada

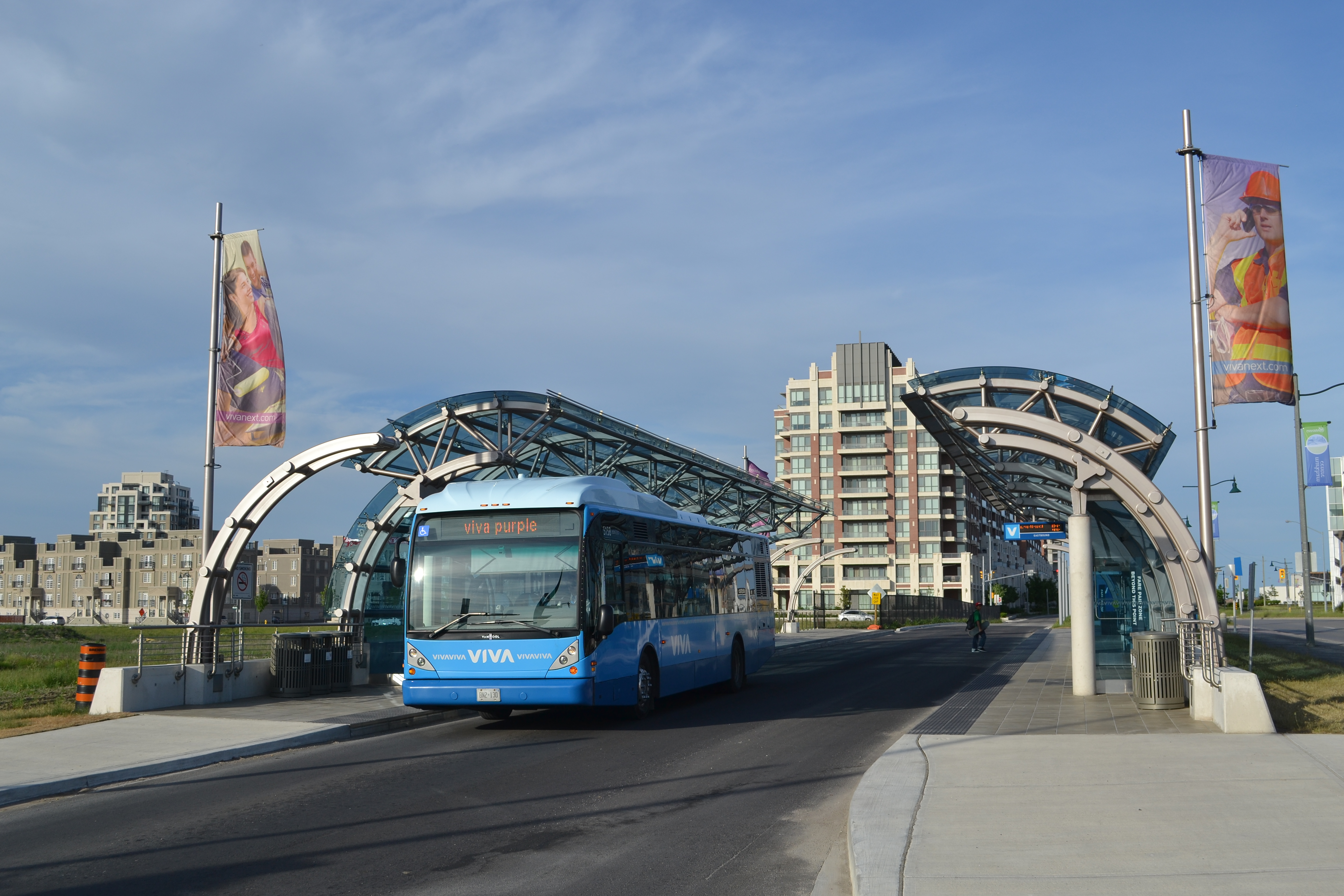
- Warden Vivastation

Overview
- System: Viva Rapid Transit
- Operator: York Region Transit
- Began service: March 6, 2011

Route
- Locale: York Region, Ontario (Vaughan; Richmond Hill; Markham)
- Start: Wigwoss–Helen
- End: Birchmount Road
- Stations: 25

The Highway 7 Rapidway in York Region, Ontario, Canada, is a bus rapid transit right-of-way that runs along Highway 7 from Bruce Street in Vaughan to Birchmount Road in Markham. There are plans to extend it west to Highway 50 and east to Cornell Terminal. It is served by the Viva Purple and Viva Orange bus routes.

== Route description ==
The Highway 7 Rapidway consists of bus lanes in the median of Highway 7 between Pine Valley Drive in Vaughan and Town Centre Boulevard in Markham. It also includes a bus-only road parallel to Enterprise Drive, between Warden Avenue and Birchmount Road. Stations along the rapidway include heated shelters protected from the elements.

== History ==
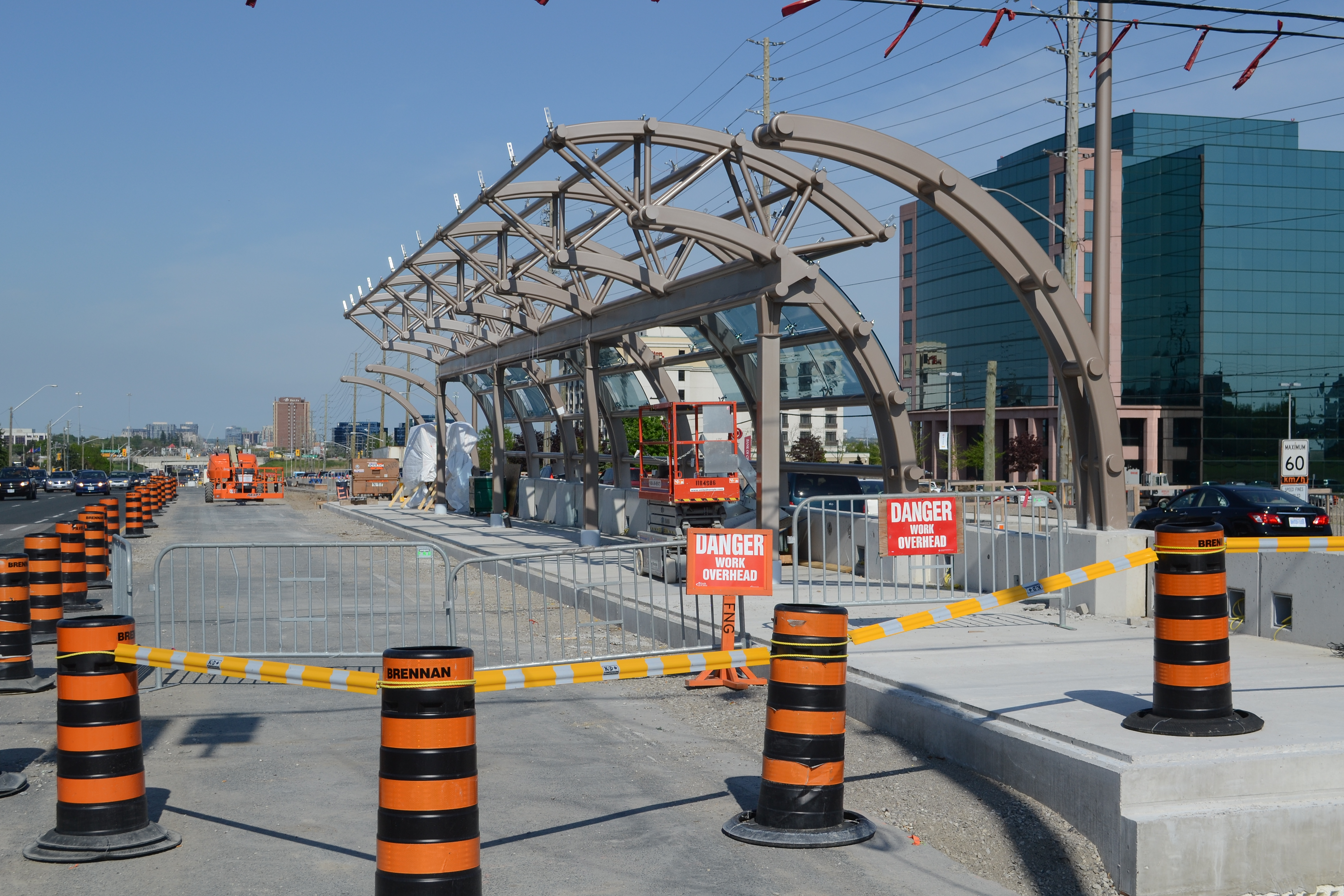
Leslie Street Rapidway station under construction in May 2012

On March 6, 2011, the first segment of the rapidway from Warden Road to Birchmount Road including the Warden Rapidway station opened. On August 18, 2013, the Rapidway along Highway 7 opened from Richmond Hill Centre to East Beaver Creek Drive and the subsequent year to Town Centre Boulevard (and to Cedarland on December 28, 2014).

On February 26, 2017, YRT 77 Highway 7 buses began serving the Creditstone and Keele Rapidway stations. After an extension of the Line 1 Yonge–University subway opened on December 17 that year, Viva Orange began serving Vaughan Metropolitan Centre subway station (via a covered on-street rapidway facility) along with Creditstone and Keele stations. Later phases will extend the rapidway west to Highway 50 and east to Cornell Terminal, potentially to the Durham Region border at the York–Durham Line.

== Stations ==
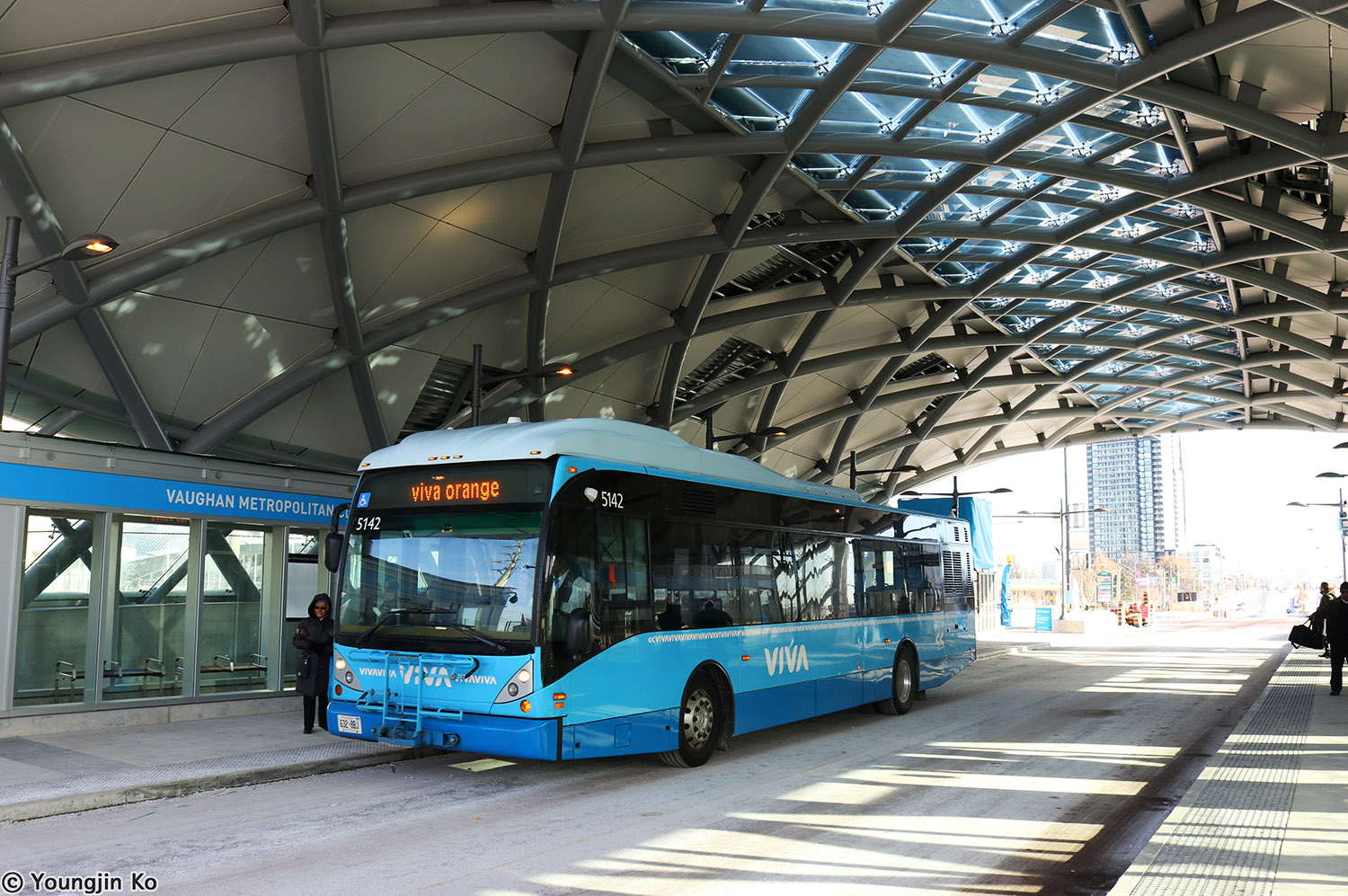
The Rapidway station at Vaughan Metropolitan Centre subway station

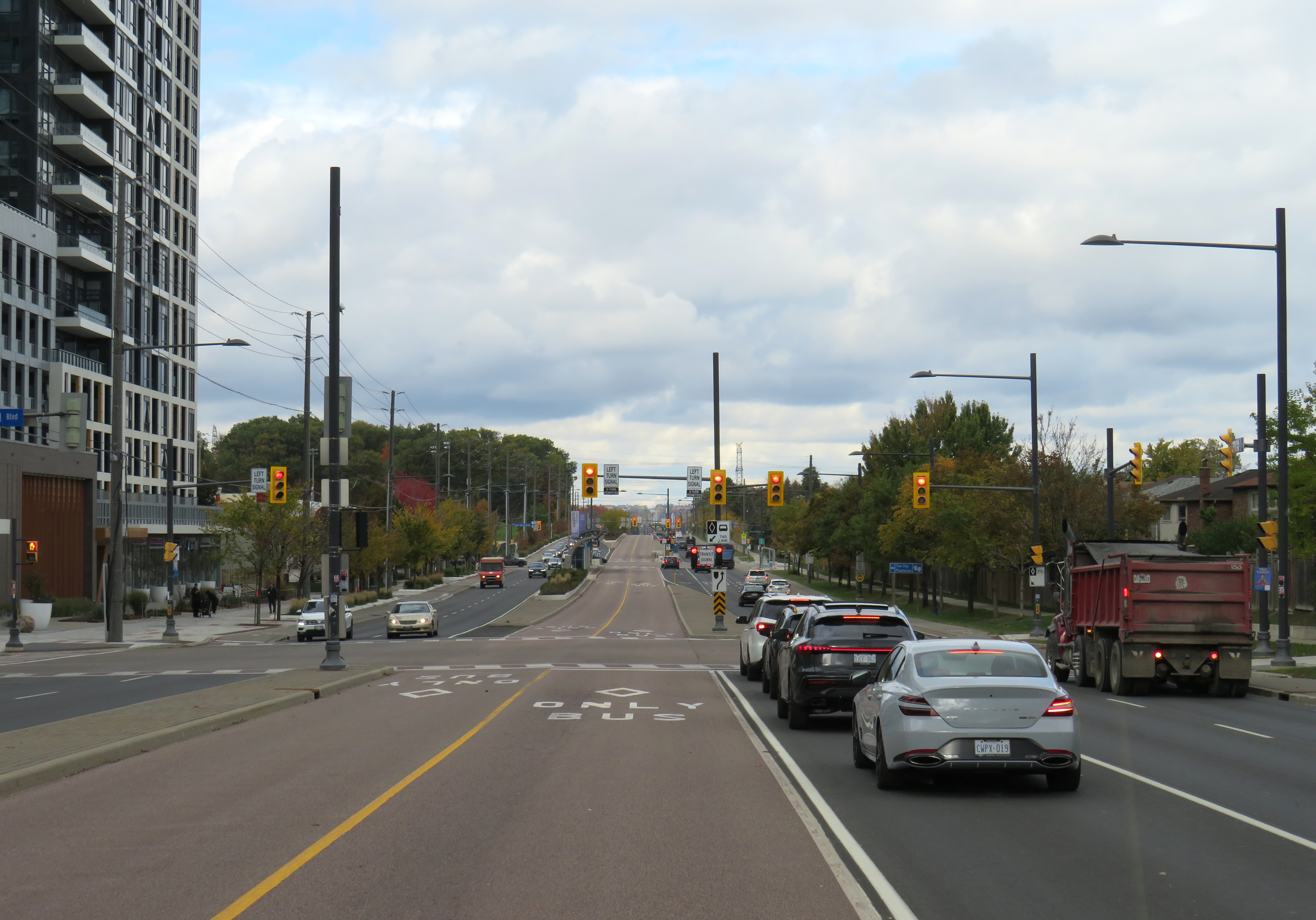
Section of the rapidway along Bathurst Street in Vaughan as seen from a Viva Orange bus

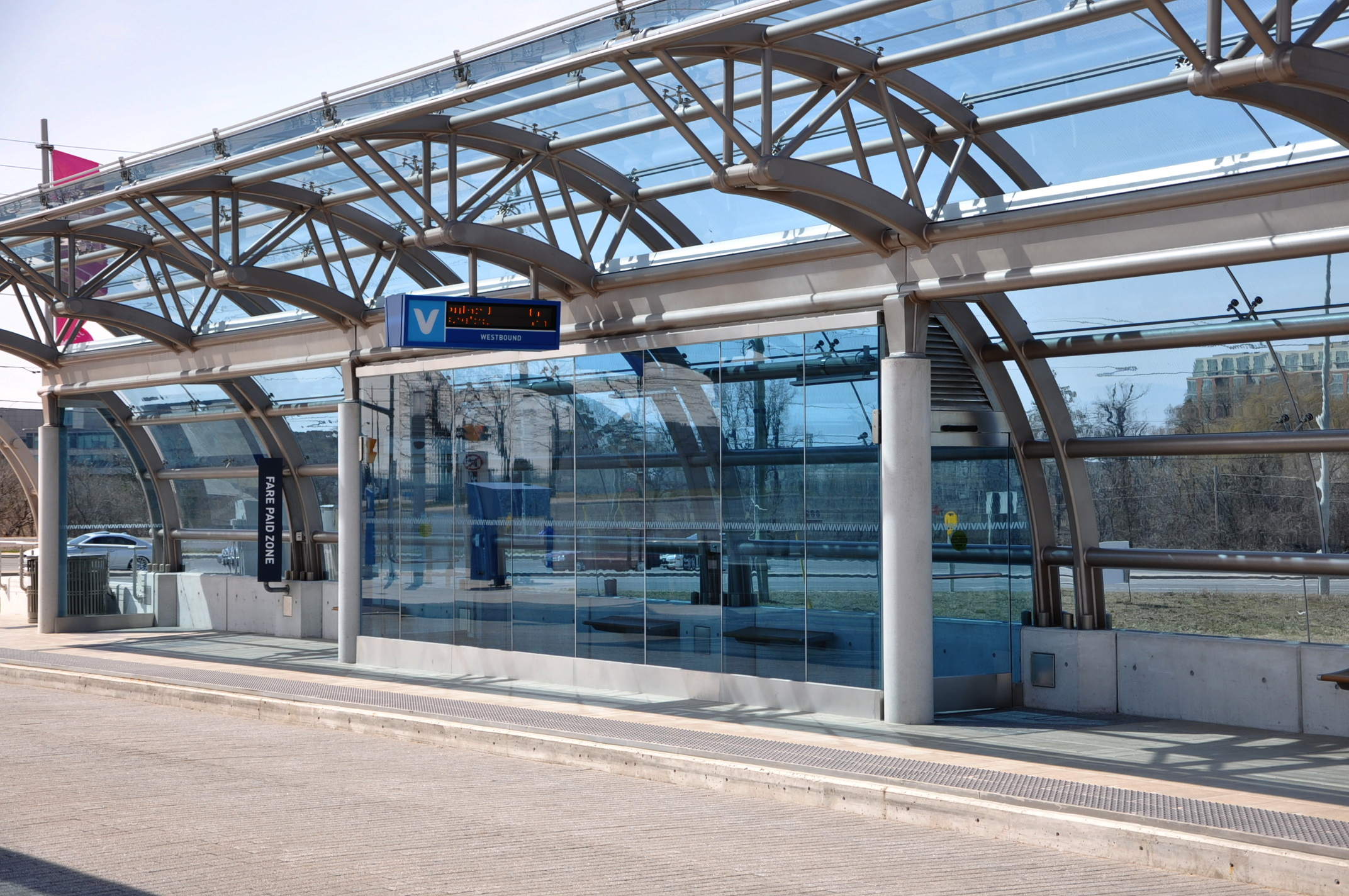
Rapidway stations feature heated shelters

There are 25 operating rapidway stations. All stations are built at-grade.

Stations
Name	Opening date	Municipality	Service
Highway 50	TBA	Vaughan	501
Highway 427	TBA	Vaughan	501
Highway 27	TBA	Vaughan	501
Martin Grove	TBA	Vaughan	501
Kipling	TBA	Vaughan	501
Islington	TBA	Vaughan	501
Wigwoss–Helen	November 24, 2019	Vaughan	501
Pine Valley	November 24, 2019	Vaughan	501
Ansley Grove	November 24, 2019	Vaughan	501
Weston	November 24, 2019	Vaughan	501
Commerce	November 24, 2019	Vaughan	501
Vaughan Metropolitan Centre	December 17, 2017	Vaughan	501
Creditstone	February 26, 2017	Vaughan	Viva Orange
Keele	February 26, 2017	Vaughan	Viva Orange
Dufferin	January 5, 2020	Vaughan	Viva Orange
Taiga	January 5, 2020	Vaughan	Viva Orange
Disera–Promenade	January 5, 2020	Vaughan	Viva Orange
Atkinson	January 5, 2020	Vaughan	Viva Orange
Bathurst	September 22, 2019	Vaughan	Viva Orange
Richmond Hill Centre Terminal	N/A	Richmond Hill	Viva Purple Viva Orange
Bayview	August 19, 2013	Markham, Richmond Hill	Viva Purple
Chalmers	August 19, 2013	Markham, Richmond Hill	Viva Purple
Valleymede	August 19, 2013	Markham, Richmond Hill	Viva Purple
West Beaver Creek	August 19, 2013	Markham, Richmond Hill	Viva Purple
Leslie	August 19, 2013	Markham, Richmond Hill	Viva Purple
East Beaver Creek	August 19, 2013	Markham, Richmond Hill	Viva Purple
Allstate Parkway	August 24, 2014	Markham	Viva Purple
Woodbine	August 24, 2014	Markham	Viva Purple
Montgomery	August 24, 2014	Markham	Viva Purple
Town Centre	August 24, 2014	Markham	Viva Purple
Cedarland	January 4, 2015	Markham	Viva Purple
Warden	March 6, 2011	Markham	Viva Purple
Andre De Grasse	TBA	Markham	Viva Purple
University	TBA	Markham	Viva Purple
Kennedy	TBA	Markham	Viva Purple
Bullock	TBA	Markham	Viva Purple
McCowan	TBA	Markham	Viva Purple
Galsworthy	TBA	Markham	Viva Purple
Main Street Markham	TBA	Markham	Viva Purple
Wootten Way	TBA	Markham	Viva Purple
Markham Stouffville Hospital	TBA	Markham	Viva Purple
Cornell Terminal	TBA	Markham	Viva Purple

Brampton Transit Züm Route 501 uses the rapidway between the Wigwoss–Helen and Vaughan Metropolitan Centre stations.

== Queen Street–Highway 7 BRT ==
Metrolinx exhibits
- Map of Q7BRT route

In January 2023, Metrolinx proposed extending the rapidway 24 kilometres (15 mi) westwards along Highway 7 from Helen Street in Vaughan to Highway 50 and then into Brampton along Queen Street, terminating at Mississauga Road. This would allow buses to travel in reserved lanes from the west end of Brampton to Vaughan Metropolitan Centre. Metrolinx has dubbed the project the Queen Street–Highway 7 BRT or Q7BRT.
