= Vaughan Metropolitan Centre station =

Toronto subway station

Vaughan Metropolitan Centre
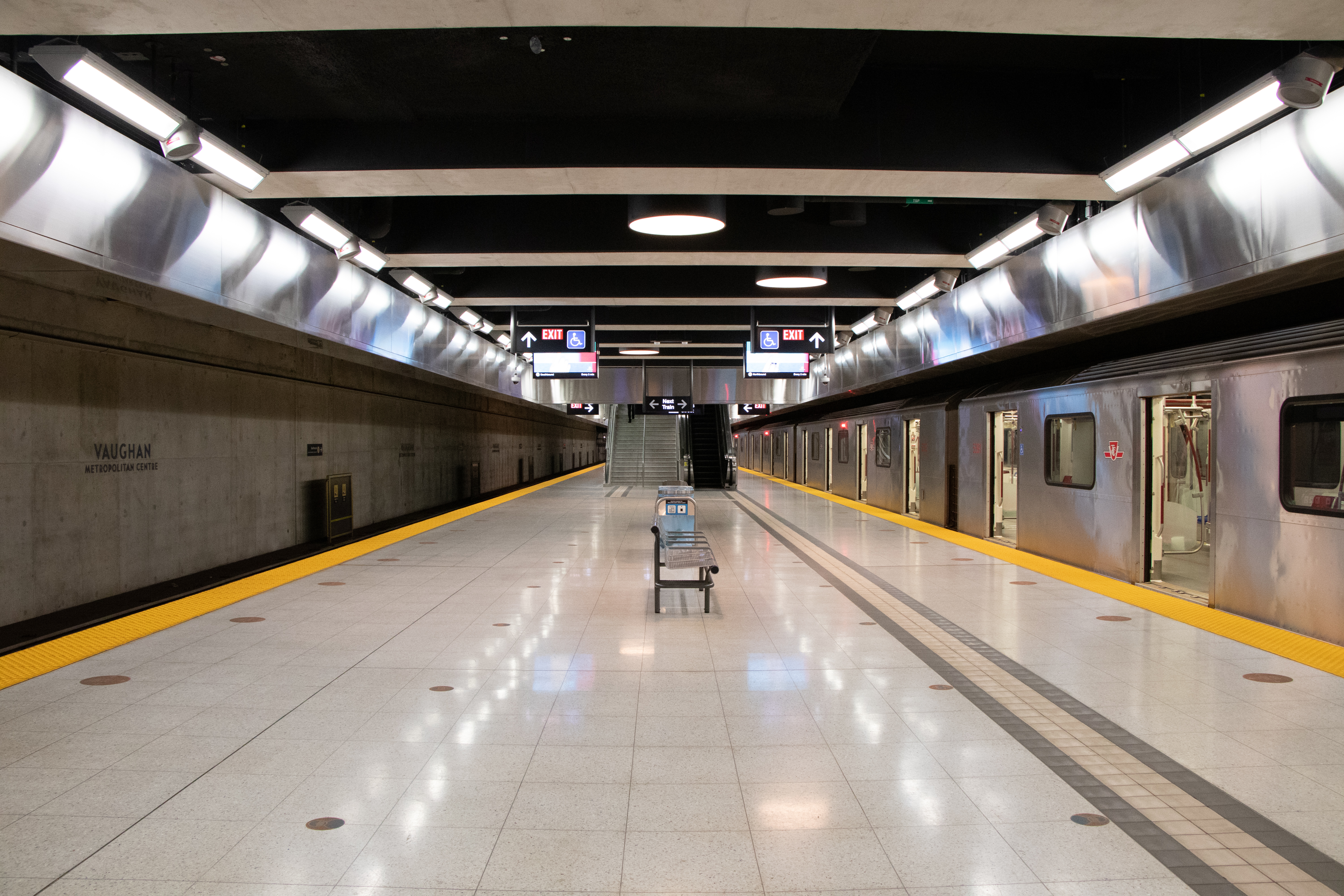

General information
- Location: 3150 Highway 7 West; Vaughan, Ontario; Canada
- Coordinates: 43°47′39″N 79°31′39″W
- Platforms: Centre platform
- Tracks: 2
- Connections: YRT 77 Highway 7 (on-street); SmartVMC Terminal; Highway 7 Rapidway

Construction
- Structure type: Underground
- Parking: 900 spaces
- Accessible: Yes
- Architect: Grimshaw Architects, Adamson Associates (as architect of record)
- Architectural style: Contemporary architecture

Other information
- Website: Official station page

History
- Opened: December 17, 2017; 8 years ago

Passengers
- 2023–2024: 20,394
- Rank: 34 of 70

Services
Preceding station	Toronto Transit Commission	Following station
Terminus	Line 1 Yonge–University	Highway 407 towards Finch
Location

Vaughan Metropolitan Centre (also known as Vaughan, Vaughan Metro Centre or VMC) is a rapid transit station in Vaughan, Ontario, Canada. Opened on December 17, 2017, it is the north terminus of the western section of the Toronto subway's Line 1 Yonge–University. It is operated by the Toronto Transit Commission (TTC) and is one of two subway stations in the system outside of Toronto's city limits. It provides connections to a York Region Transit (YRT) Viva bus rapid transit route along the Highway 7 Rapidway, which is also used by a Brampton Transit Züm route, as well as several local YRT bus routes.

Located in Vaughan Metropolitan Centre, the suburban city's planned downtown, the station is designated by Metrolinx as a mobility hub, one of several multimodal transit terminals in the Greater Toronto and Hamilton Area. The station has a 900-space park-and-ride lot, which is privately owned and operated by SmartCentres, unlike other TTC rapid transit station parking lots which are owned by the TTC and operated by the Toronto Parking Authority.

== Description ==
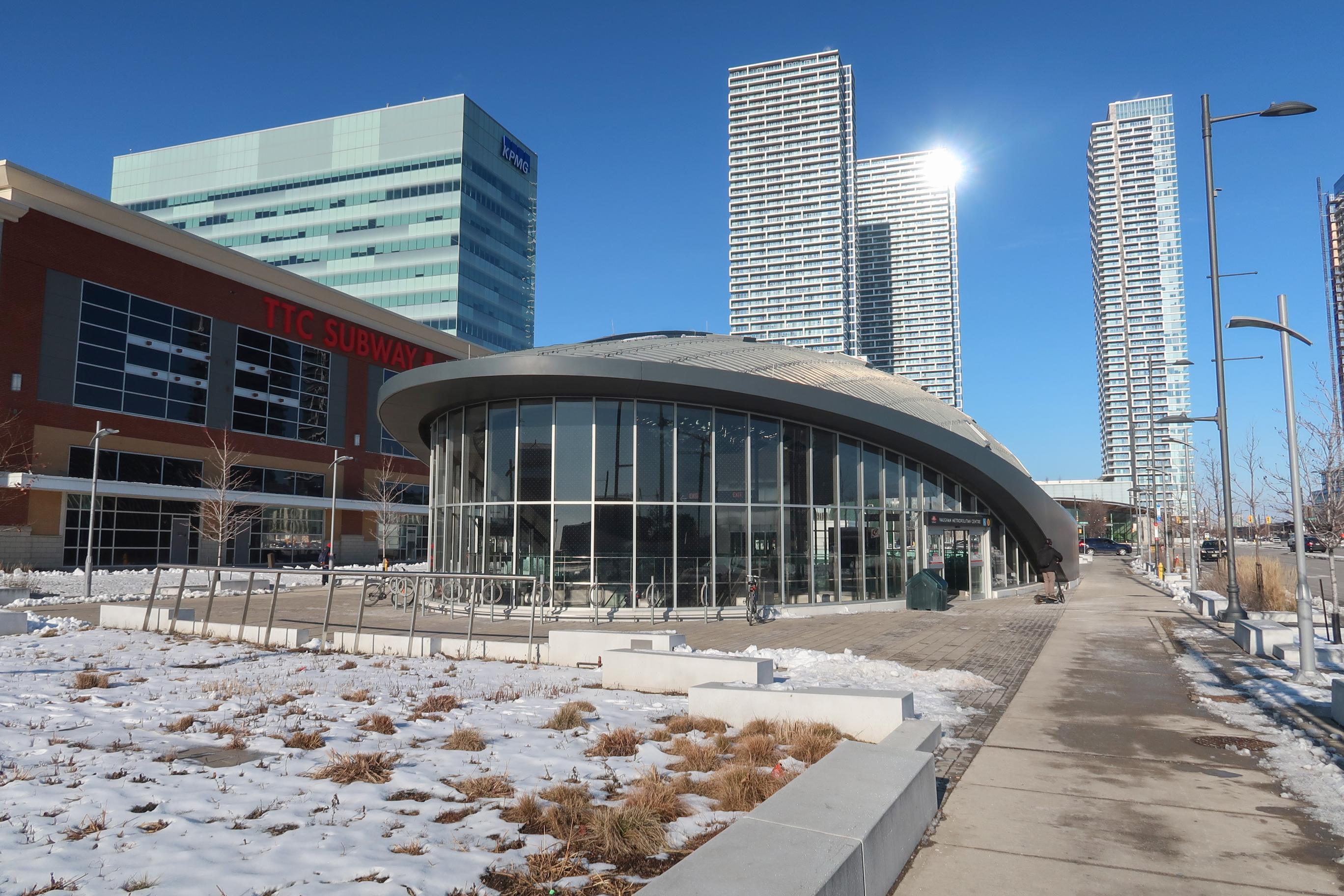
Main station entrance building

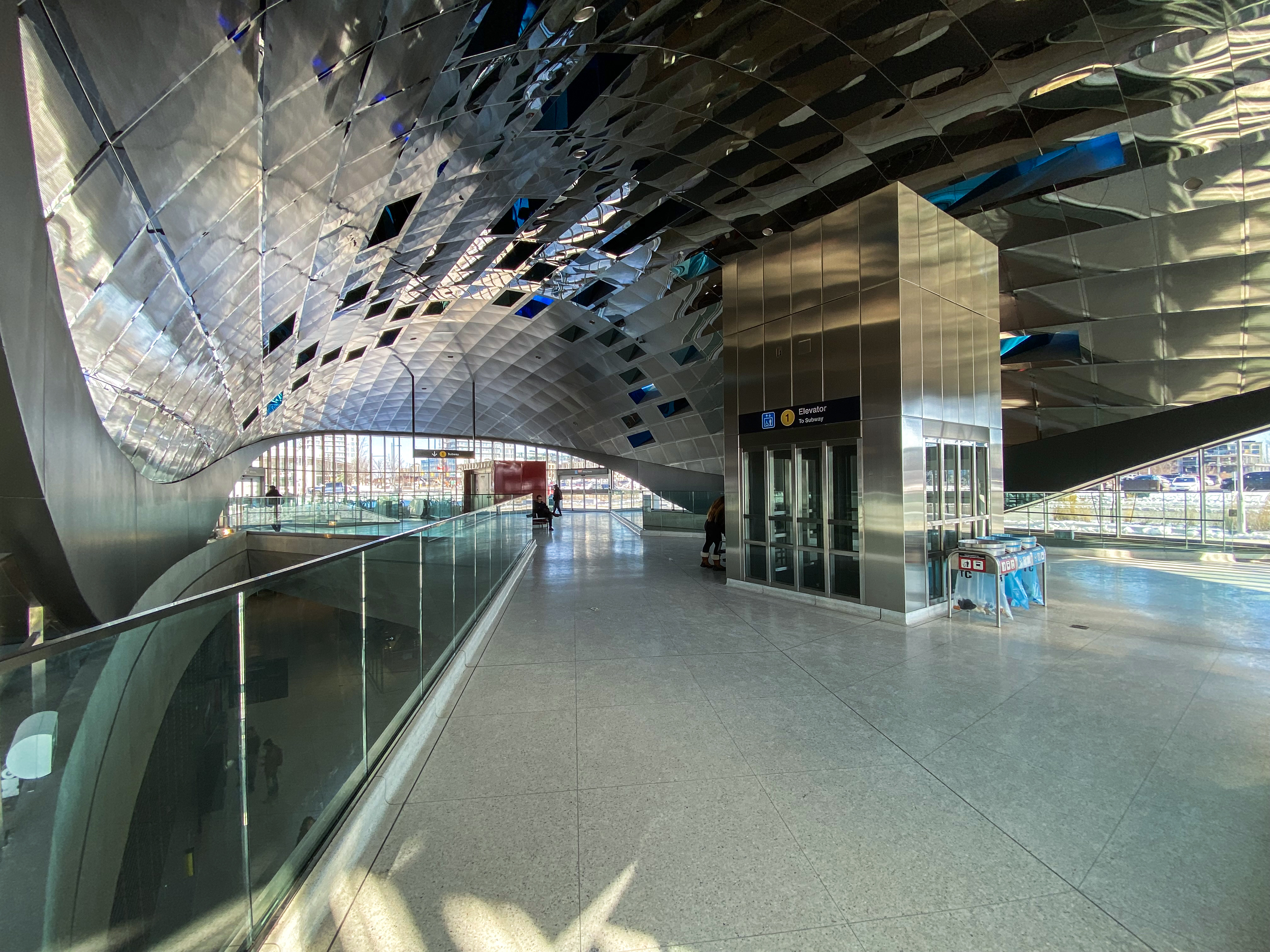
Artwork Atmospheric Lens with coloured mirrored panels on the station dome

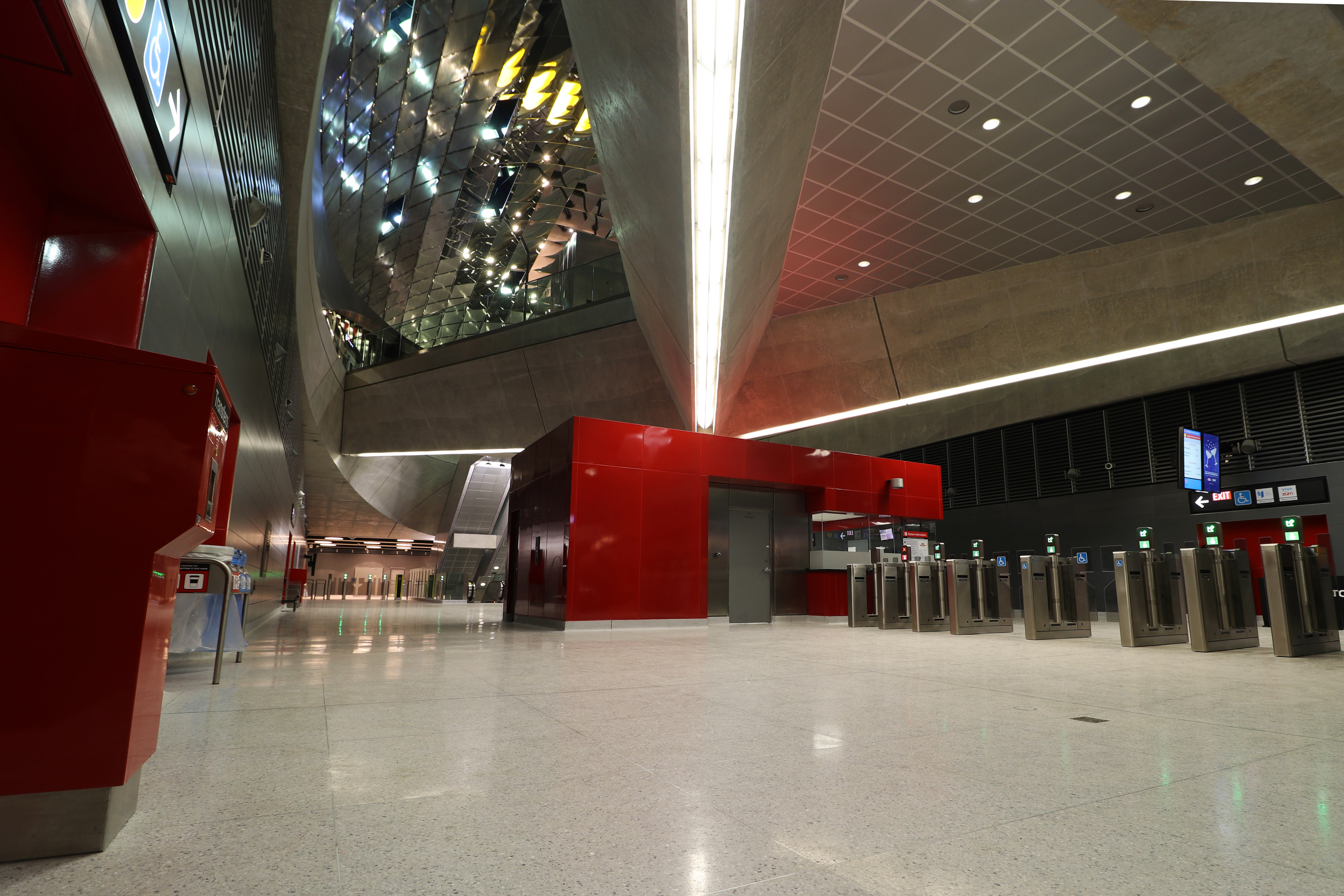
Station concourse

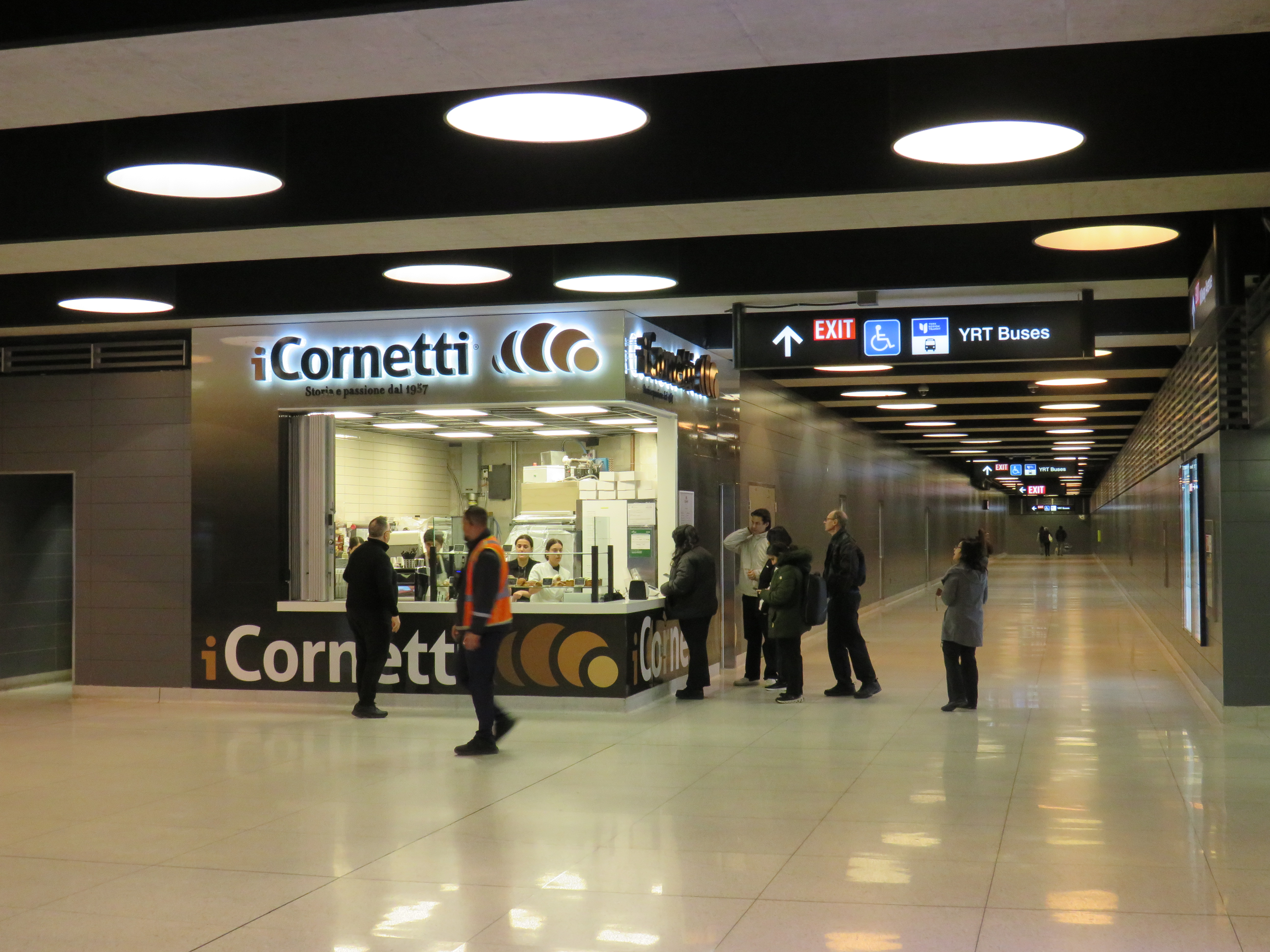
Retail space in the concourse and the walkway to the SmartVMC Bus Terminal

The subway station is located on the northwest corner of Millway Avenue and Highway 7, west of Jane Street, and is one of two new stations that are outside the City of Toronto in York Region. This is the northernmost station in the subway system.

Grimshaw Architects designed the station, which has a domed ovoid entrance building just north of the Rapidway platforms on Highway 7; Adamson Associates Architects served as the architect of record. The building has four main entrances in an X pattern, plus an underground connection to two office buildings, one of which contains the David Braley Vaughan Metropolitan Centre of Community, which houses a YMCA and the VMC branch of the Vaughan Public Library. The main entrance features a cool roof, and a nearby electrical substation located on the south side of Highway 7 has a green roof. Toronto-based Paul Raff Studio provided the station's artwork, titled Atmospheric Lens, consisting of coloured mirrored panels and windows located on the domed ceiling, and visible by looking up stairwells.

Underground corridors lead both north and south from the station's concourse level to two York Region Transit (YRT) bus terminals. The north corridor leads to the SmartVMC Bus Terminal, where passengers can transfer to conventional YRT bus routes, and the south corridor leads to the Vaughan Metropolitan Centre Vivastation on the Highway 7 Rapidway, where riders connect to Viva and Züm bus rapid transit routes. The fare-paid area features a Gateway Newstands kiosk.

== History ==
On November 27, 2009, the official groundbreaking ceremony was held for the Toronto–York Spadina Subway Extension (TYSSE), and tunnelling began in June 2011. The project was expected to be completed by the fourth quarter of 2016, but the timeline was revised, with the station planned to open by the end of 2017.

The opening of the extension to Vaughan took place at the station on December 17, 2017, attended by Prime Minister Justin Trudeau, Premier of Ontario Kathleen Wynne and Mayor of Toronto John Tory. The station replaced Sheppard West as the northwestern terminus of Line 1.

While VMC, along with the five other TYSSE stations, had a fare booth installed as per original station plans, it never housed collectors, as the station was among the first eight (along with the first two south of the extension) to discontinue sales of legacy TTC fare media such as tokens and tickets. Presto vending machines were available at its opening to sell Presto cards and to load funds or monthly passes onto them. On May 3, 2019, this station became one of the first ten stations to sell Presto tickets via Presto vending machines.

== Name ==
During the early planning stages of the TYSSE, the City of Vaughan proposed the name Vaughan Corporate Centre for the station, after its planned downtown area. After changing the name of the development to Vaughan Metropolitan Centre, the city requested that the station be named accordingly.

On September 30, 2010, a TTC committee recommended that the name be shortened to Vaughan Centre. However, the official decision was delayed until February 2012, when the TTC adopted Vaughan's desired name. The original reason for revising the name was to avoid associating the station with a specific development project. Moreover, the length of Vaughan Metropolitan Centre was viewed as impractical, and Vaughan Centre followed the TTC's naming convention for other district-based stations (i.e. North York Centre and Scarborough Centre).

A 2011 poll showed that 80% of respondents supported Vaughan Centre, 5% supported Vaughan Corporate Centre, 9% supported Vaughan Metropolitan Centre, and 7% supported other names. Alternate names under consideration included Highway 7, Highway 7 West, Jane North, Edgeley, Creditstone, and Applewood.

For operational simplicity, exterior destination signs on Toronto Rocket trains show "1 Vaughan" on the front and back and "Line 1 towards Vaughan" on the sides, rather than the full station name.

== Subway infrastructure in the vicinity ==
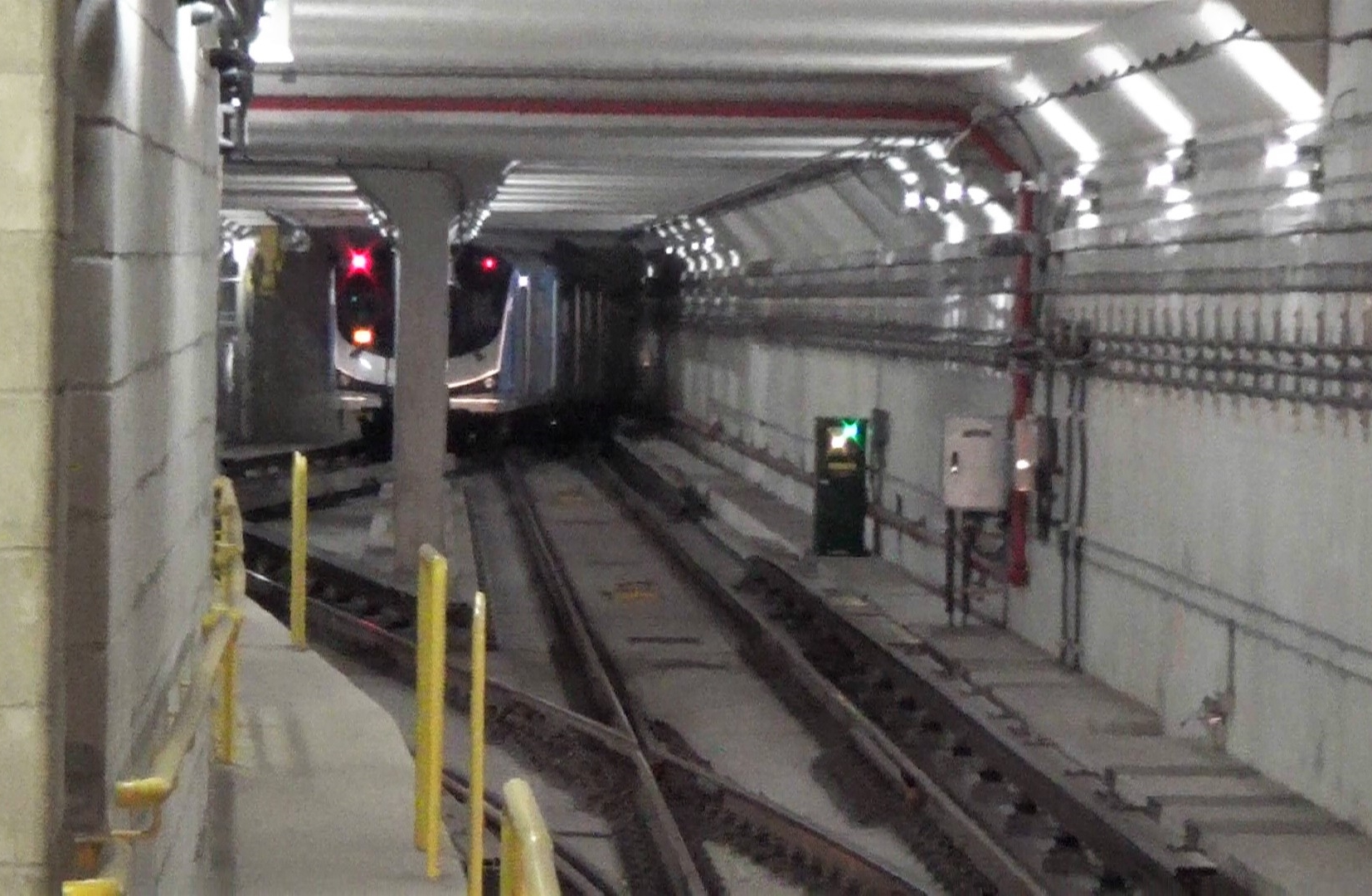
The station crossover with a departing train crossing into the southbound track

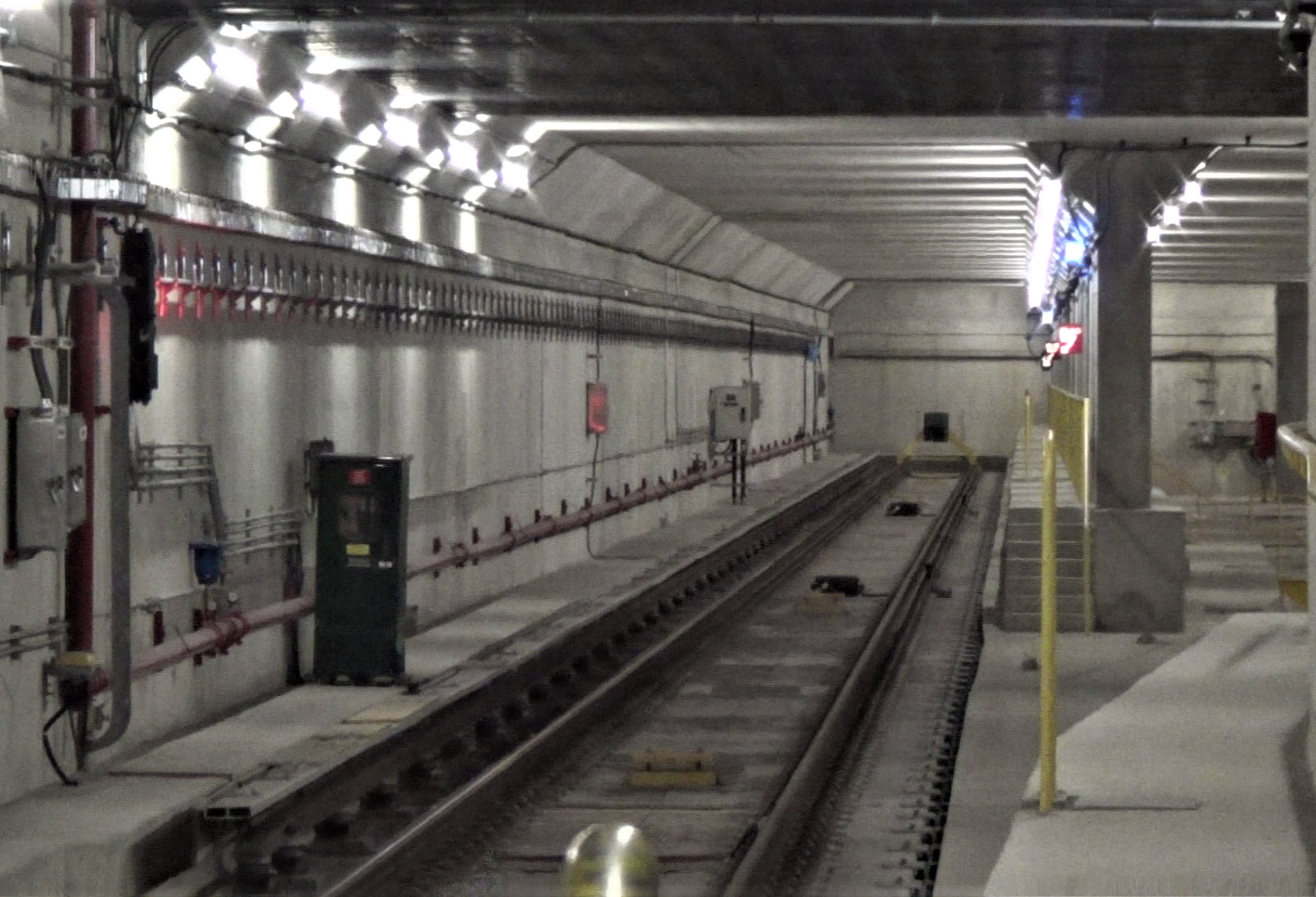
Looking north to the end of the west (southbound side) tail track

Photos taken in 2018, several months after the station opened. Note the clean tunnels still free of accumulated deposits.

As this is a terminal station, there is a diamond crossover to the south of the platform for arriving trains to cross over to the southbound track, and for departing trains on the northbound track to cross to the southbound track. There are also tail tracks beyond the north end for overnight storage for two trains, with a trackless extra tunnel between them for a future potential third.

== Fare zone ==
Despite being located outside Toronto in York Region, the station has always been within the Toronto TTC fare zone to avoid implementing a payment-on-exit system. This was the case even before the implementation of the One Fare program on February 26, 2024, which allows riders paying by Presto card, credit card, or debit card to transfer for free to and from regional buses serving the station. This was in contrast to TTC-contracted bus routes, when all riders were required to pay extra fare (either YRT or TTC) when crossing the municipal boundary at Steeles Avenue. At this station (as well as at the adjacent Highway 407 station) prior to fare integration, separate fares were charged for all transfers between the TTC subway and connecting regional buses, which are the only surface routes serving it.

== Surface connections ==
No TTC buses connect to this station, but the aforementioned two bus terminals serve regional buses:

=== SmartVMC Bus Terminal ===
SmartVMC Bus Terminal
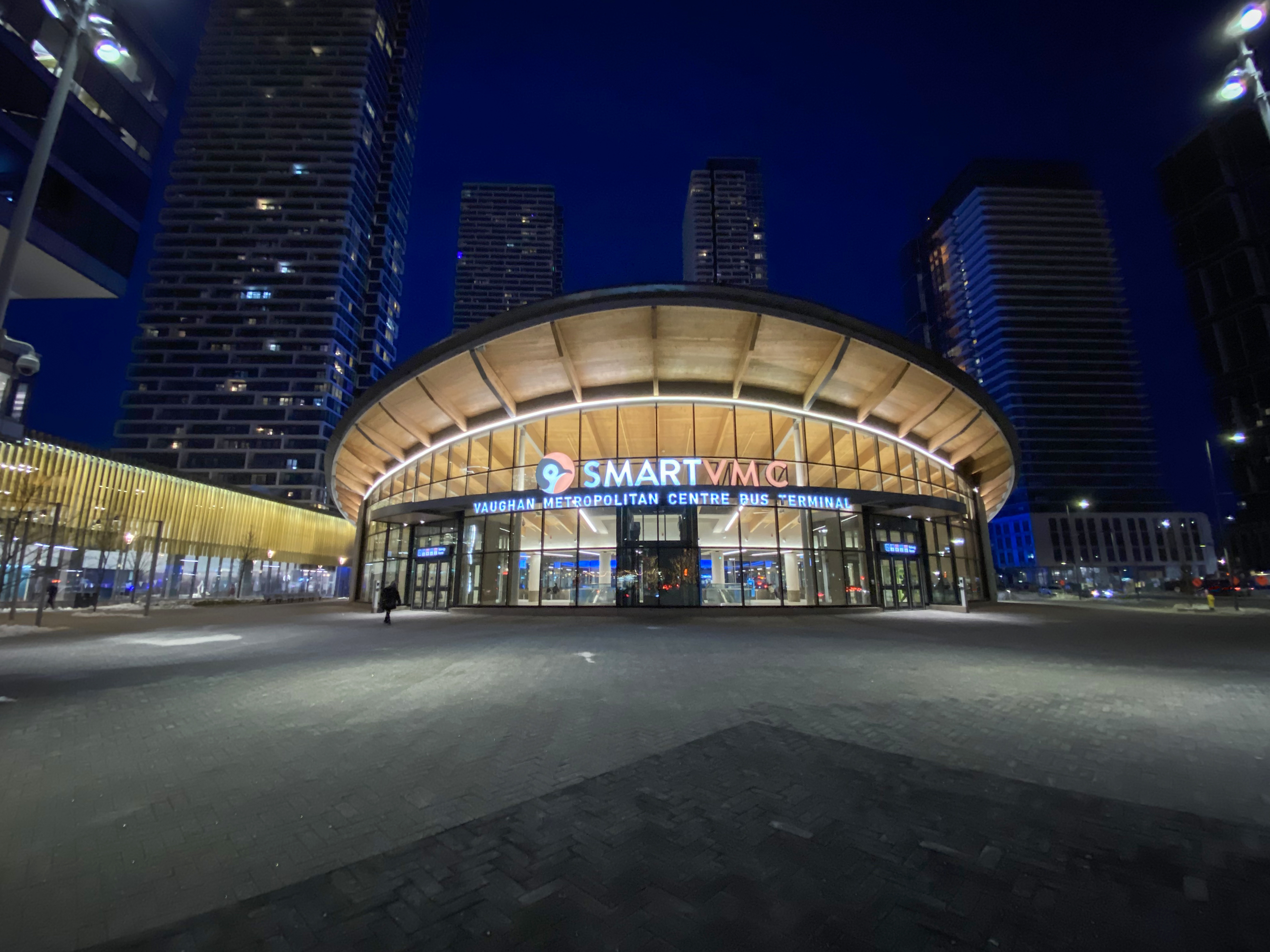
- SmartVMC Bus Terminal

General information
- Location: 173 Millway Avenue, Vaughan, Ontario; Canada
- Coordinates: 43°47′47″N 79°31′41″W
- Owner: Regional Municipality of York
- Operator: York Region Transit, Brampton Transit
- Bus routes: YRT buses: 10 Woodbridge; 20 Jane; 26 Maple; 320 Jane Express; MP Mobility Plus (paratransit service); 501 Queen
- Bus stands: 9

Construction
- Accessible: Yes

Other information
- Website: Official station page

History
- Opened: November 3, 2019
Location

SmartVMC Bus Terminal (originally named SmartCentres Place Bus Terminal) is a YRT bus terminal located on the northwest corner of Apple Mill Road and Millway Avenue north of the station, outside the fare-paid area. Diamond Schmitt Architects designed the terminal in a horseshoe shape. The building features open architecture that can be accessed from every direction. There is a passenger kiss-and-ride area on Millway Avenue and an underground walkway linking it with the subway station and Viva rapidway station on Highway 7.

The total cost of the terminal was approximately $32 million. The terminal was named after its developer, SmartCentres REIT, who contributed $15 million in financing for an underground connection between the bus terminal and the station.

The terminal was opened on November 3, 2019, nearly two years after the station. It was expected to open in early 2018, shortly after the station itself, but it was delayed due to unspecified circumstances. Prior to the opening of the terminal, buses used the current kiss-and-ride area.

Passengers using Presto, credit, or debit cards can transfer for free under the One Fare program between the TTC and YRT / Brampton Transit's Züm buses. The province reimburses each transit agency for lost revenue from the free transfers. As free card transfers need to be recorded for reimbursements, both the SmartVMC terminal and the Vivastation will remain outside the station's fare-paid area. This is also necessary to enforce double-fare payment for riders ineligible for free transfers.

The following YRT routes serve the terminal:

Route	Name	Notes
10	Woodbridge	Westbound to Martin Grove Road (Rush hour service only)
20	Jane	Northbound to Teston Road via Vaughan Mills Terminal and Major Mackenzie West Terminal; southbound to Pioneer Village station via Highway 407 station
26	Maple	Northbound to Maple GO Station via Vaughan Mills Terminal (Rush hour service only)
320	Jane Express	Northbound to Major Mackenzie West Terminal via Vaughan Mills Terminal; southbound to Highway 407 station
Mobility Plus

It is also served by a Brampton Transit bus rapid transit route, the 501 Züm Queen (which also stops at the Vivastation on Highway 7):

Route	Name	Notes
501	Züm Queen	Westbound to Brampton Downtown Terminal

The following YRT route uses an on-street stop at the station's main entrance on Highway 7 and does not stop inside the terminal or Vivastation:

Route	Name	Notes
77	Highway 7	Westbound to The Gore Road
77	Highway 7	Eastbound to Finch Bus Terminal (Finch station)

=== Vivastation ===
Vaughan Metropolitan Centre Vivastation
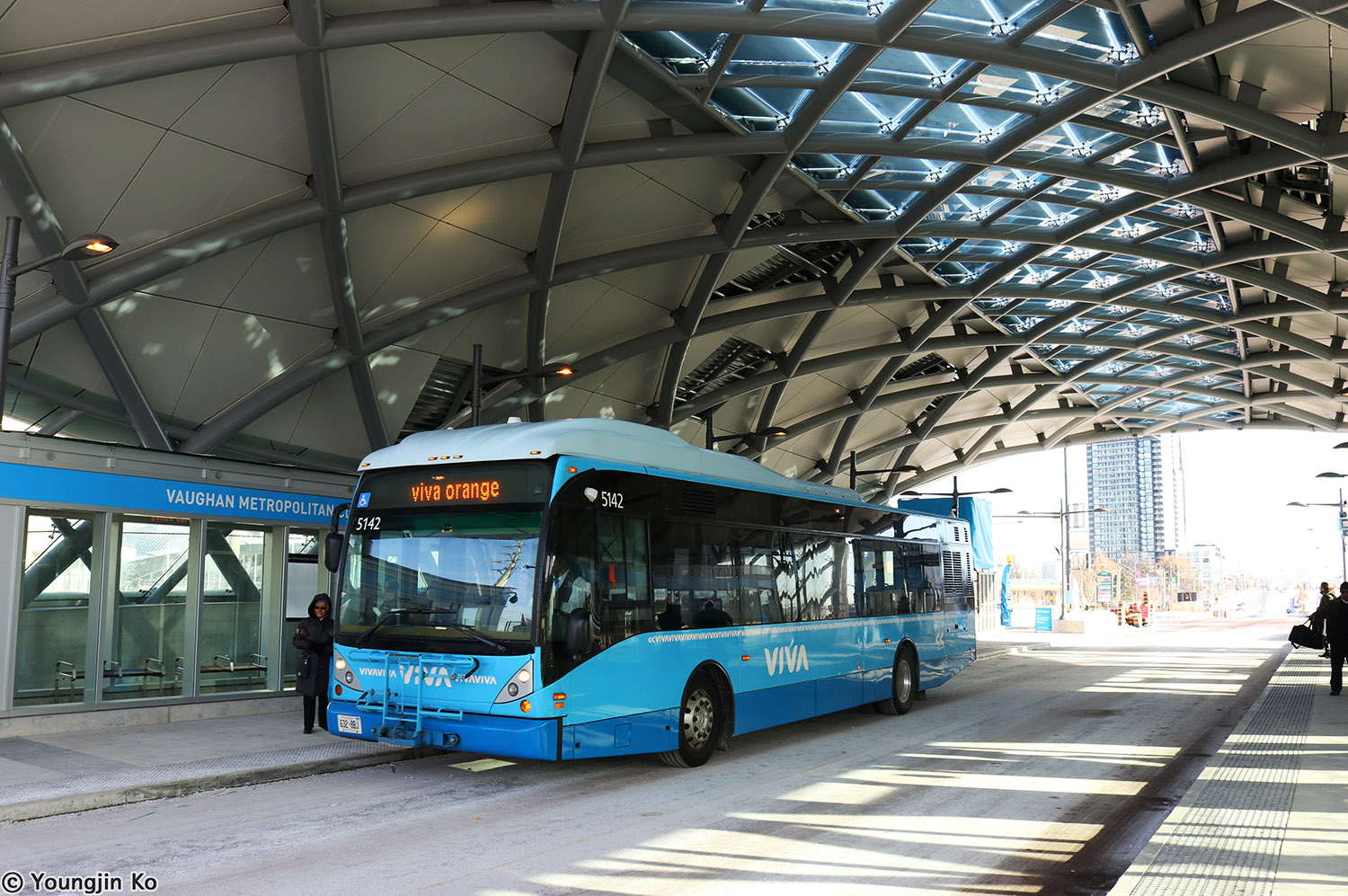
- Viva Orange bus at VMC Vivastation

General information
- Location: Centre of Highway 7 Rapidway
- Platforms: 2 (1 eastbound, 1 westbound)
- Bus routes: Viva Orange; 501 Queen

Construction
- Structure type: Covered transfer facility within dedicated right-of-way
- Accessible: Yes

Other information
- Website: Official station page

History
- Opened: December 17, 2017
Location

The Vaughan Metropolitan Centre Vivastation is a covered transfer facility in the centre of the Highway 7 Rapidway. It allows Viva Orange buses and Brampton Transit–operated 501 Züm Queen through-service buses to quickly serve the subway station without having to pull into the SmartVMC terminal, although the 501 does terminate there (though it formerly continued to York University) while also serving the Vivastation. The facility is located directly above the station's concourse and connects to it via escalators and elevators. It is located south of the main station building and bus terminal, both of which can be accessed from the Vivastation either underground through the concourse or at ground level via crosswalks.

== City centre development ==
Vaughan plans to build a transit-oriented city centre from scratch around the station in what is a low-density area featuring big-box stores and vacant land. Vaughan projects that by 2031, the new downtown will have 25,000 residents and employment for more than 11,000 people. Vaughan planning commissioner John MacKenzie said that Mississauga took 20 to 25 years to build its city centre without a subway, but hopes to accelerate the process in Vaughan with the help of the subway extension.
