= Bathurst Street (Toronto) =

Street in Toronto and York Region in Ontario, Canada

Coordinates: 43.6742°N 79.4147°W

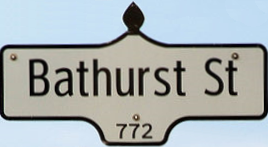
- York Regional Road 38
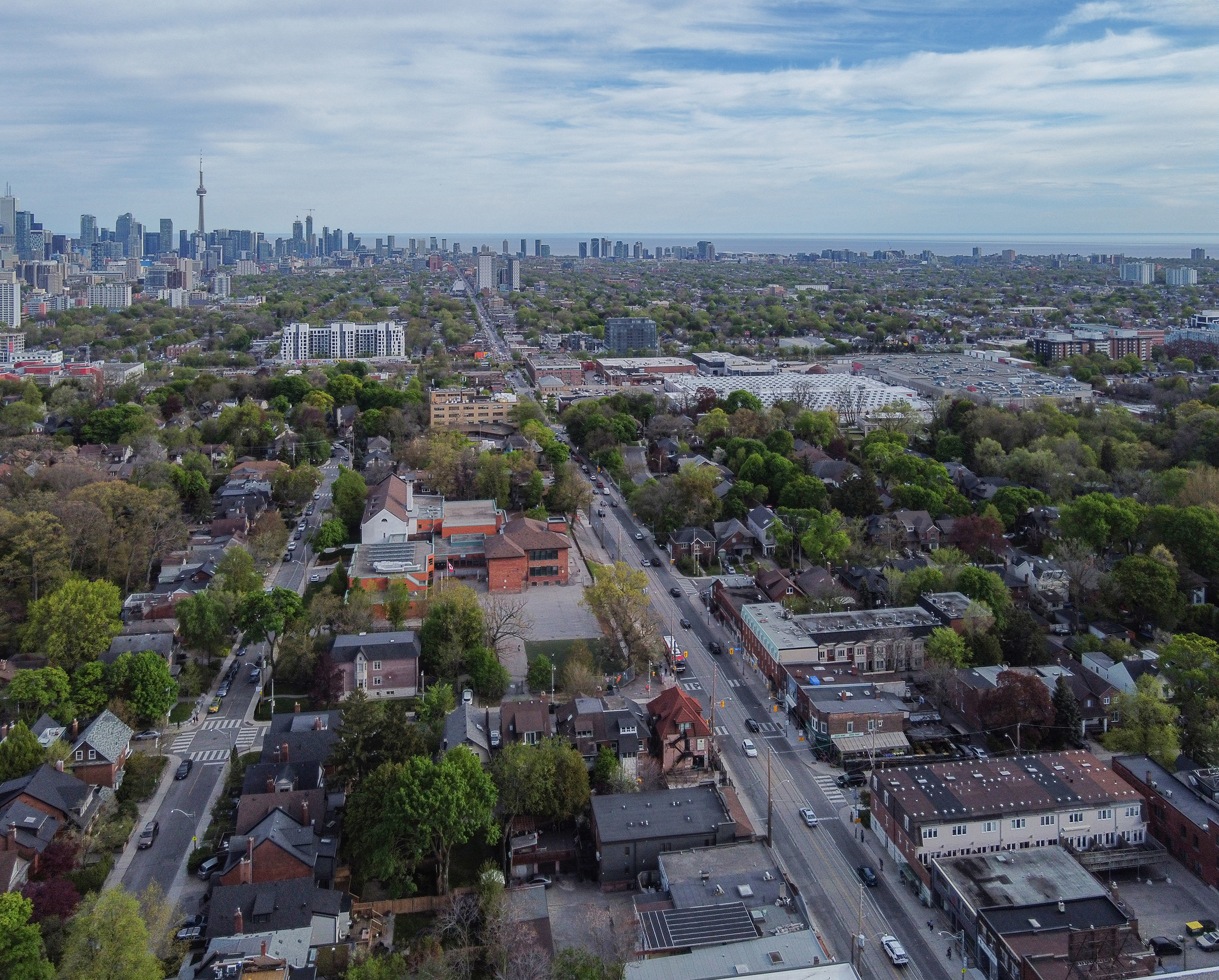
- Southward aerial view of Bathurst Street from near Casa Loma

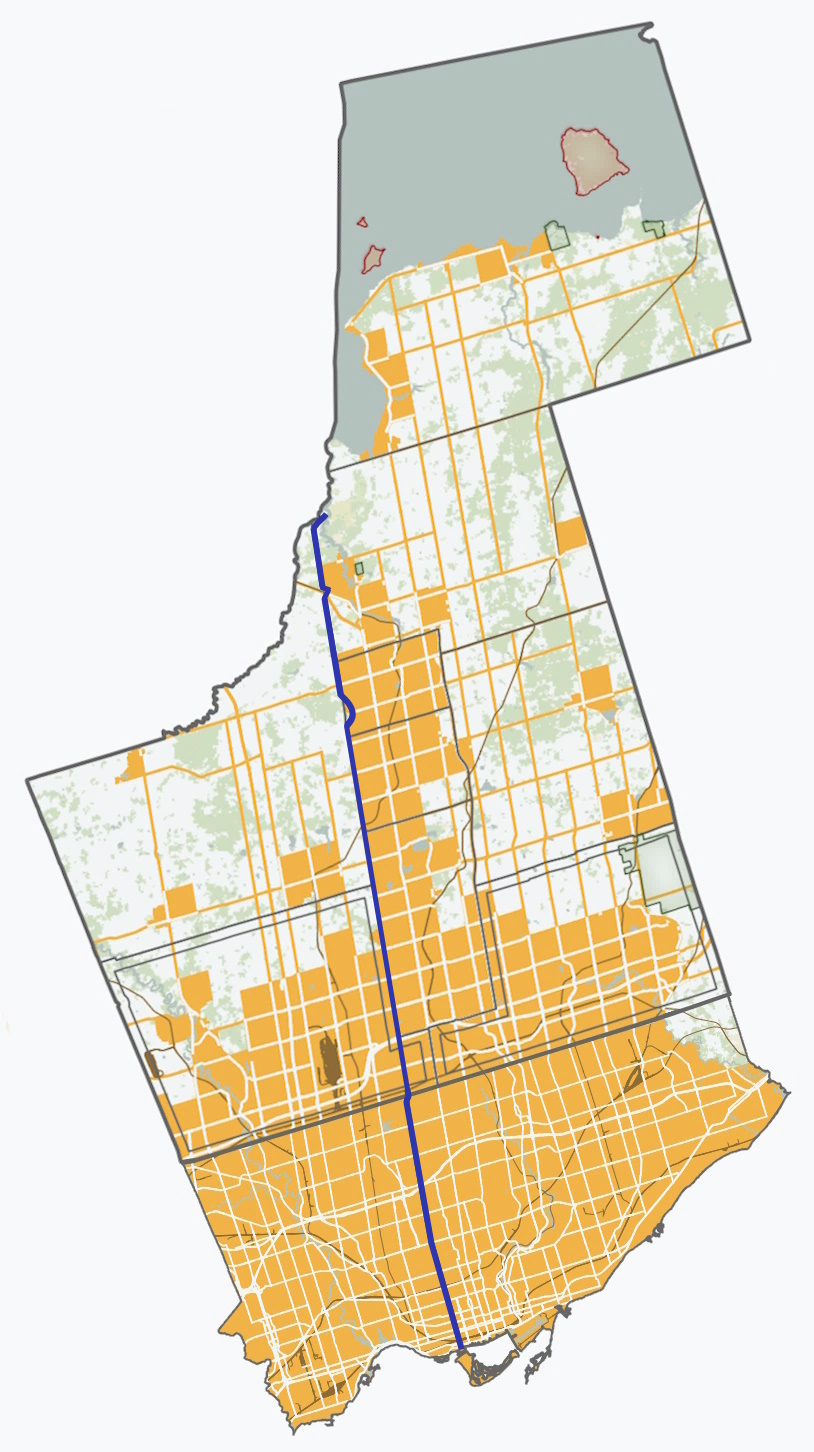
- Bathurst Street (blue line) through Toronto and York Region
- Maintained by: City of Toronto; York Region; Town of East Gwillimbury
- Length: 57.4 km (35.7 mi)
- Location: Toronto, Vaughan, Richmond Hill, King, Aurora, Newmarket, East Gwillimbury
- South end: Queens Quay (continues as Eireann Quay, which leads to the ferry dock for Billy Bishop Toronto City Airport)
- Major junctions: Lake Shore Boulevard; King Street; Queen Street; Dundas Street; Bloor Street; St. Clair Avenue; Eglinton Avenue; Lawrence Avenue; Highway 401; Sheppard Avenue; Finch Avenue; Steeles Avenue; Highway 407; Highway 7 Rutherford Road / Carrville Road; Major Mackenzie Drive; King Road; Bloomington Road; Wellington Street; St. John’s Sideroad; Mulock Drive; Davis Drive; Green Lane; Former Highway 11
- North end: Holland Marsh

Other
Nearby arterial roads
← Dufferin Street	Spadina Avenue; Avenue Road; Yonge Street →

Bathurst Street is a main north–south arterial road in Toronto, Ontario, Canada. It begins at an intersection of the Queens Quay roadway, just north of the Lake Ontario shoreline. It continues north through Toronto to the Toronto boundary at Steeles Avenue. It is a four-lane thoroughfare throughout Toronto. The street continues north into York Region where it is also designated York Regional Road 38, and ends in the Holland Marsh.

== Route description ==
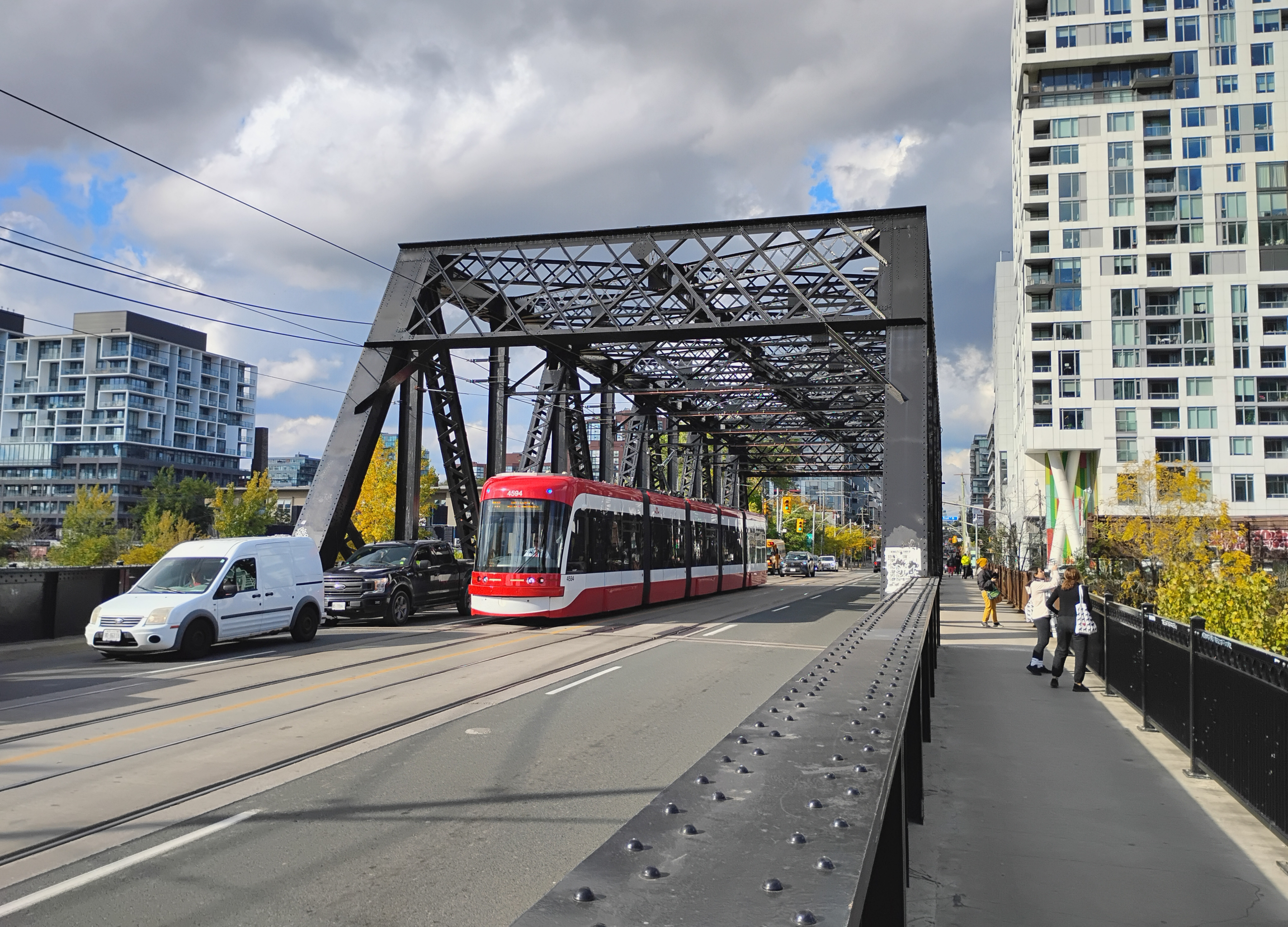
A 511 Bathurst streetcar on Bathurst on the Sir Isaac Brock Bridge above the Union Station Rail Corridor

Bathurst Street begins in the south at the intersection with Queens Quay. The southernmost part of Bathurst, south of the Gardiner Expressway, was heavily industrialized until the 1970s. These factories are now gone; in their place, some residential condominium development has occurred, including the extended Queen's Quay. South of the intersection, Eireann Quay, a former section of Bathurst Street, runs south to the ferry dock for the Billy Bishop Toronto City Airport on the island and the Western Gap channel which separates the Toronto Islands from the Toronto mainland.

North of the Gardiner is Fort York on the western side. The Sir Isaac Brock Bridge then carries the street across the Union Station Rail Corridor to Front Street. The bridge was relocated here in 1916, after being used as a railway bridge over the Humber River. North of the tracks, the area is a mix of small commercial and residential buildings on the western fringe of downtown. North of Queen Street, the eastern side of Bathurst is the edge of the Alexandria Park cluster of housing projects, while to the west is the Trinity-Bellwoods residential neighbourhood. North of Dundas Street, Bathurst is dominated by Toronto Western Hospital on the east. This part of the street continues to be a mix of small commercial establishments and residential housing, generally rental apartments.

North of College Street, Bathurst Street becomes more residential, with the exception of certain areas, chiefly around the intersections with Bloor Street, St. Clair Avenue, and Eglinton Avenue. For a short distance north of Bloor, Bathurst is the western boundary of The Annex neighbourhood.

The western segment of Toronto Transit Commission (TTC) Line 1 Yonge–University crosses underneath Bathurst north of St. Clair Avenue, just west of the St. Clair West station. North of Eglinton, the street continues into the former borough of North York. Development along both sides of the road is both residential and commercial, with shopping plazas at many intersections. The West Branch of the Don River crosses Bathurst Street north of Sheppard and Bathurst Park (Hinder Property) is on the east side of Bathurst Street.

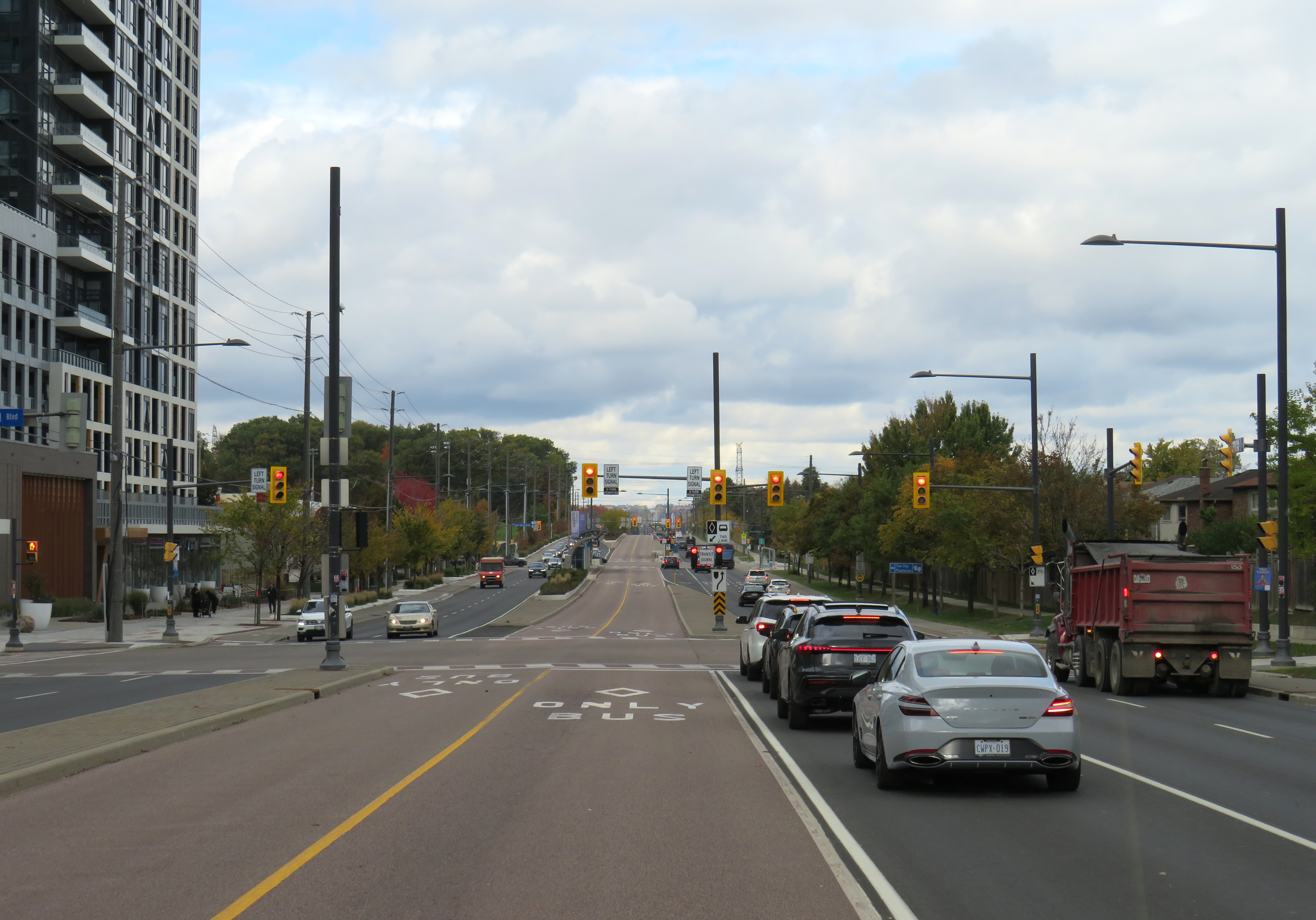
Bathurst St. in Vaughan as seen from a Viva Orange bus on the Highway 7 Rapidway, which follows a short section of the street

North of Steeles Avenue, Bathurst runs through York Region, and is also referred to as York Regional Road 38. At Steeles, Bathurst briefly widens to six lanes until passing under the CN York subdivision. A dedicated bus rapid transit facility, the Highway 7 Rapidway (bypassing a section of Highway 7), used by Viva Orange buses, runs down the centre of the street between Centre Street and Highway 7. Bathurst again widens to six lanes from Highway 407 before going back to four lanes at Autumn Hill Boulevard. Bathurst is flanked by residential subdivisions on both sides from Steeles until Elgin Mills, where then only the eastern side has residential, forming a sharp urban-rural divide. Bathurst continues this way for 20 km until meeting Green Lane, where it narrows to two lanes and is flanked by rural land on both sides. After meeting former Highway 11 (now York Regional Road 1), Bathurst Streets jogs for a bit until it enters Holland Landing, where it becomes a semi-rural residential road. Bathurst Street loses its Regional Road status at Queensville Sideroad, where it enters the Holland Marsh. It serves as the boundary between Vaughan and Richmond Hill north of Highway 407, and between King Township and Newmarket and Aurora.

Bathurst Street ends at the Holland Marsh, between Holland Landing (in East Gwillimbury) and Bradford, with the section north of Queensville Sideroad being maintained by the Town of East Gwillimbury. Beyond a marina on the Holland River, it continues as a private driveway to a property along the Holland Marsh.

Old Bathurst Street runs north of St John's Sideroad to 19th Sideroad where Bathurst Street was re-routed.

== History ==
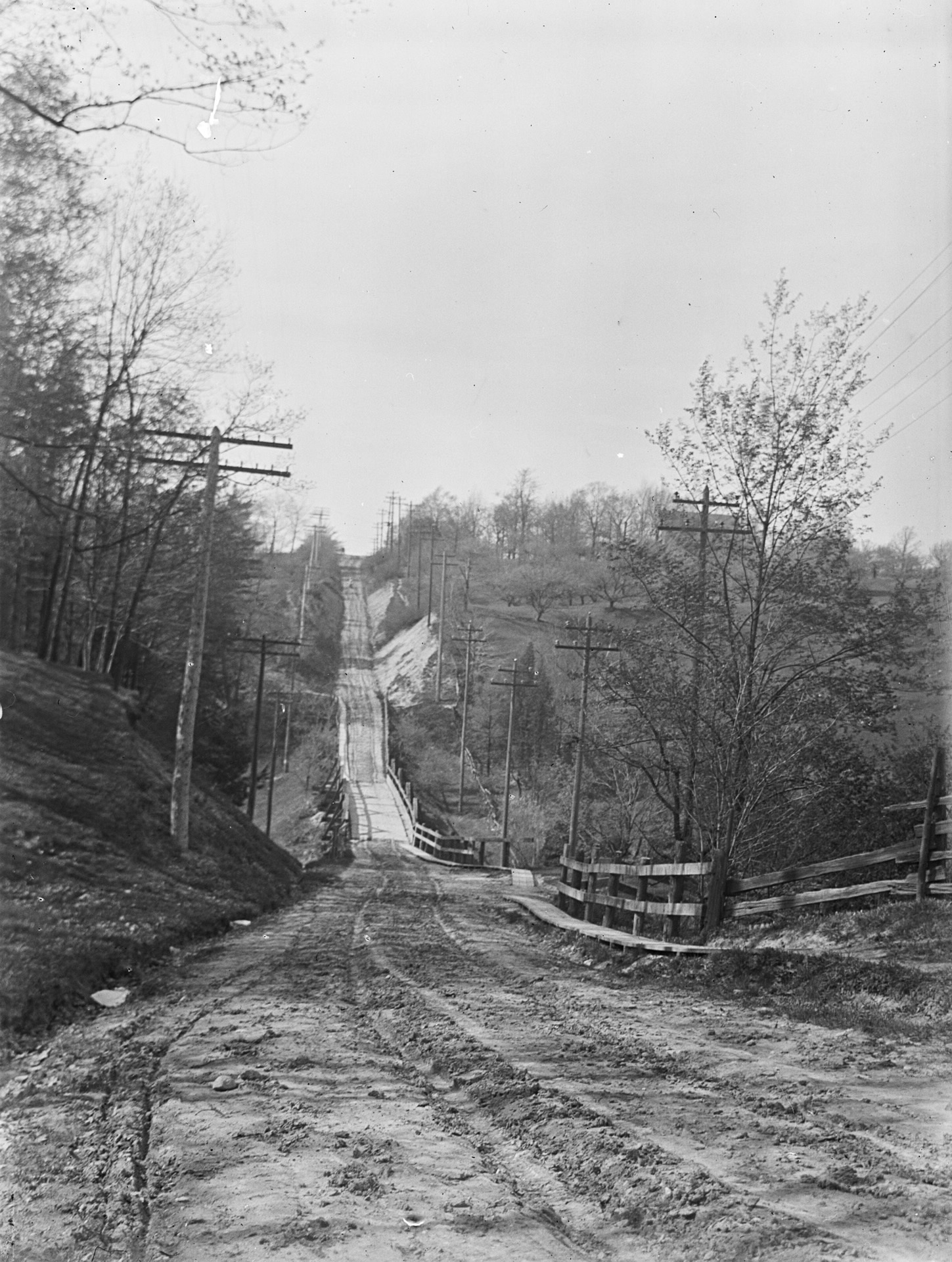
Bathurst Street in 1915, just north of the contemporary Lonsmount Drive

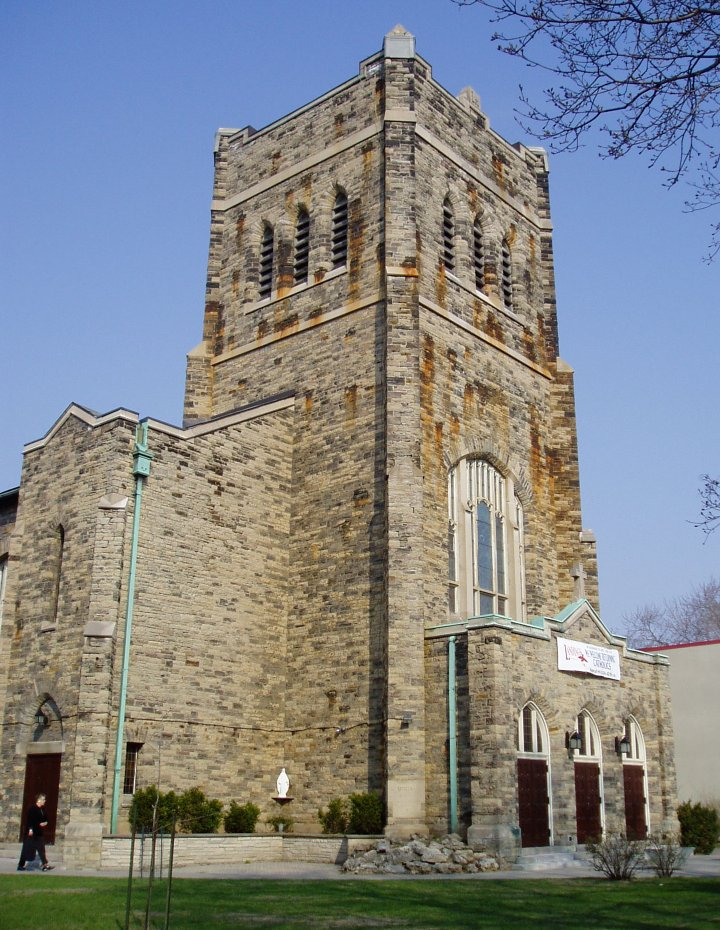
Located across from Bathurst subway station, St. Peter's Catholic Church is a landmark on Bathurst Street.

The street was named for Henry Bathurst, 3rd Earl Bathurst, who organized migration from the British Isles to Canada after the War of 1812, granted the charter to University of Toronto (then known as King's College). He also never visited Canada.

The original Bathurst Street was between Government Wharf and Queen Street, and the section to the north was called Crookshank's Lane, a semi-private lane named after George Crookshank. The intersection with Davenport was the site of Toll Gate #3 along Davenport. The tollkeeper's cottage, which was built in 1835, still exists, restored to its original appearance and is located at the north-west corner of the intersection. In 1870, Crookshank's Lane was renamed "Bathurst Street". North of Bloor, Bathurst Street was a muddy trail.

Prior to the late 1980s, the section of Bathurst St. between Centre Street and Langstaff Road / York Regional Road 7 (the latter formerly Highway 7), was a part of Highway 7, which followed it as the highway jogged between concession roads. The jog along Bathurst was eliminated when a diagonal connector was built to the west to join the two sections of the highway as a single roadway.

Bathurst Street finished in the top 10 in Canadian Automobile Association's "Ontario's Worst Roads" poll in every year from 2004 to 2007.

Bathurst was formerly interrupted for roughly 500 m due to rugged terrain north of Morning Sideroad, northwest of Newmarket, but the gap was closed in 2016 when a new link was completed to York Regional Road 1 (former Highway 11).

== Jewish community ==
Bathurst Street has been the heart of the Jewish community of Toronto for decades. From the early part of the 20th century, many Jews lived around Bathurst Street south of Bloor Street east to Spadina Avenue (and particularly Kensington Market) and west to past Christie Pits. After World War II, as the community became more middle class, it moved north along Bathurst Street, with wealthier members of the community moving to Forest Hill. Some other members moved to the area around Bathurst and St. Clair Avenue or Bathurst and Eglinton Avenue.

The community continued to move north along Bathurst and today, much of the Jewish community resides along the street from north of St. Clair Avenue and, in higher concentrations just south of Lawrence Avenue to beyond the city limits at Steeles Avenue, and extending further until about Elgin Mills Road in Richmond Hill. Many synagogues and other Jewish community institutions are on Bathurst.

The northern stretch of Bathurst, north of Sheppard Avenue West, has become one of the centres of Toronto's Russian community. Many Russian Jewish immigrants began to settle in the area's apartment buildings (many are around the Bathurst/Sheppard intersection, and along Bathurst between Finch Avenue West and Steeles Avenue West), starting from early 1970s to get easier access to services provided by the Jewish Immigrant Aid Society. After the breakup of the Soviet Union, many Russian immigrants to Canada settled there. Many are affiliated with the Jewish Russian Community Centre. The electoral district of York Centre, which includes Bathurst from Wilson Ave. to Steeles Ave. West, has the largest number of Russian Canadian voters in Canada. Numerous Russian delicatessens, restaurants, and book and clothing stores have earned the neighborhood the unofficial moniker "Little Moscow".

== Public transit ==
The Toronto Transit Commission (TTC) operates the 511 Bathurst streetcar route from Bathurst subway station (at Bloor Street) to Fleet Street, where it turns west to connect to Exhibition GO station at Exhibition Place.

North of Bloor, public transit is provided by two TTC bus routes: Route 7 Bathurst from Bathurst station up to Steeles Avenue, and 160 Bathurst North from Wilson Avenue up to New Westminster Drive and Atkinson Avenue in Vaughan. During overnight hours bus route 307 Bathurst Blue Night covers the entire length of Bathurst within the City of Toronto.

There are two Toronto subway stations located on Bathurst where lines cross it: The aforementioned Bathurst station is a Line 2 Bloor–Danforth station located at Bloor Street, and Forest Hill is a Line 5 Eglinton station located at Eglinton Avenue.

Within Vaughan, York Region Transit runs several routes along Bathurst Street, including the 88 Bathurst from Finch Bus Terminal to Seneca College King Campus, part of Viva Orange, and other connections at the Promenade Terminal.

=== Priority transit lanes ===
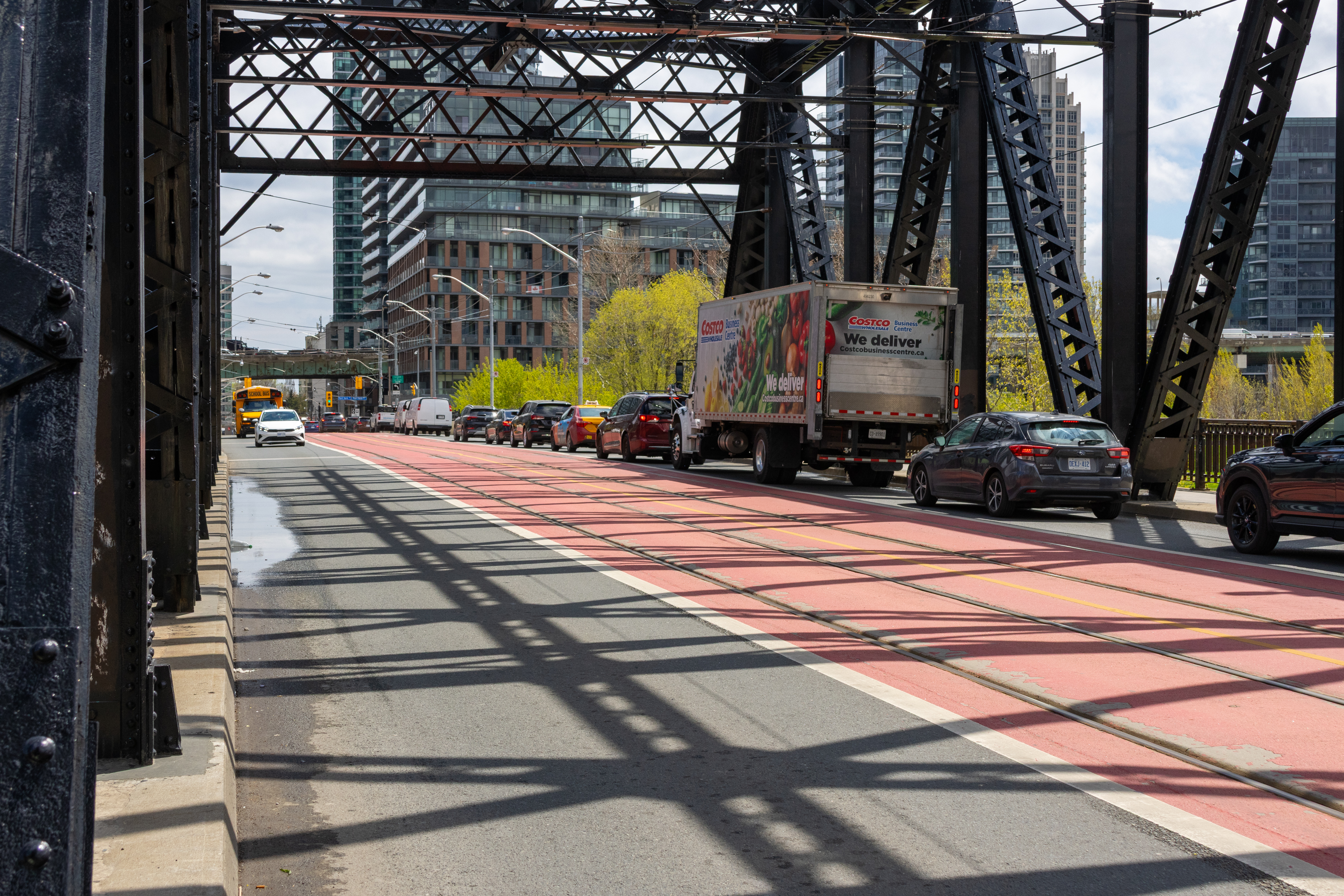
Two middle lanes painted red to signify priority for streetcars on Bathurst Street in 2026

In 2025, the City of Toronto approved dedicated lanes for buses on Bathurst Street south of Bloor Street. Under the plan, dubbed "RapidTO," centre lanes were turned into priority lanes for streetcars in an effort to make transit more reliable. The municipal government started the process of painting the priority lanes red in November 2025, hoping to finish in time for the start of the 2026 FIFA World Cup in Toronto in June.

== Points of interest ==
For many years, the most notable attraction on Bathurst Street was the now-demolished bargain goods emporium Honest Ed's at Bloor Street. Other landmarks along Bathurst include:

- Toronto Island Airport Ferry Terminal
- Bathurst Bowlerama (demolished)
- Bathurst Glen Golf Course
- Bathurst station
- Sir Isaac Brock Bridge
- The Tollkeeper's Cottage
- Toronto Public Library - Wychwood Branch
- Baycrest Geriatric Centre
- Cedarvale Park
- Central Technical School
- Cineforum
- College Street United Church
- Earl Bales Park
- École Secondaire Catholique Renaissance
- Esther Shiner Stadium
- The Hemingway Apartments. From 1923 to 1924, novelist Ernest Hemingway rented an apartment on Bathurst Street north of St. Clair Avenue while employed as a reporter for the Toronto Star. A historic plaque was placed on the building by the Toronto Historical Board.
- Lawrence Manor
- Lawrence Plaza
- Little Norway Park
- North York Branson Hospital
- Randolph Theatre (formerly Bathurst Street Theatre)
- Richmond Hill Golf Club
- Sarah and Chaim Neuberger Holocaust Education Centre
- St. Clair West station
- St. Michael's College School
- Promenade shopping centre
- Toronto Waldorf School
- Toronto Western Hospital
- Toronto Transit Commission - Hillcrest Complex
- Raoul Wallenberg Road
- Westmount Collegiate Institute
