= Melanie Cole =

Canadian ice dancer

Personal information
- Other names: Melanie Cole Moffatt
- Born: July 27, 1968 (age 57) Newmarket, Ontario

Figure skating career
- Country: Canada
- Partner: Michael Farrington; Martin Smith; Donald Godfrey
- Skating club: Upper Canada Skating Club; Newmarket Figure Skating Club
- Retired: 1989

Melanie Cole Moffatt (born July 27, 1968) is a Canadian former competitive ice dancer. With Michael Farrington, she is the 1988 Golden Spin of Zagreb champion, 1988 Skate Canada International bronze medalist, and 1988 Canadian national bronze medalist. The two competed at the 1988 Winter Olympics in Calgary, finishing 16th.

== Career ==
As a child, Cole trained at the Newmarket Figure Skating Club.

Skating with Donald Godfrey, she became the Canadian national novice champion in 1984. The two finished seventh at the 1985 World Junior Championships, which took place in December 1984 in Colorado Springs, Colorado.

Cole and her next partner, Martin Smith, placed fourth at the 1986 World Junior Championships in December 1985 in Sarajevo and won the Canadian national junior title the same season. The following season, they competed on the senior level, placing 8th at the 1986 Skate America.

In 1987, Cole teamed up with Michael Farrington at the Upper Canada Skating Club. In their first season together, they won bronze at the Canadian Championships and were named in Canada's Olympic team. They finished 16th at the 1988 Winter Olympics, which took place in February in Calgary, Alberta. In March, they placed 15th at the 1988 World Championships in Budapest, Hungary.

Cole/Farrington competed one more season together, winning gold at the 1988 Golden Spin of Zagreb and bronze at the 1988 Skate Canada International. Cole decided to retire from competition in 1989, saying in a 2011 interview that skating was "too expensive" and "I was done and ready to move on. I had no hard feelings or regrets."

Cole Moffatt joined the York Regional Police in 1990.

In 2011, she was inducted into the Newmarket Sports Hall of Fame.

== Results ==
=== With Farrington ===
International
Event	1987–88	1988–89
Winter Olympics	16th	
World Championships	15th	
Golden Spin of Zagreb		1st
Skate Canada International		3rd
National
Canadian Championships	3rd	5th

=== With Smith ===
International
Event	1985–86	1986–87
Skate America		8th
International: Junior
World Junior Championships	4th	
Merano Autumn Trophy	1st	
National
Canadian Championships	1st J	7th

=== With Godfrey ===
International: Junior
Event	1984–85
World Junior Championships	7th
