= Viva Rapid Transit =

Express bus network in York Region, Ontario

Viva

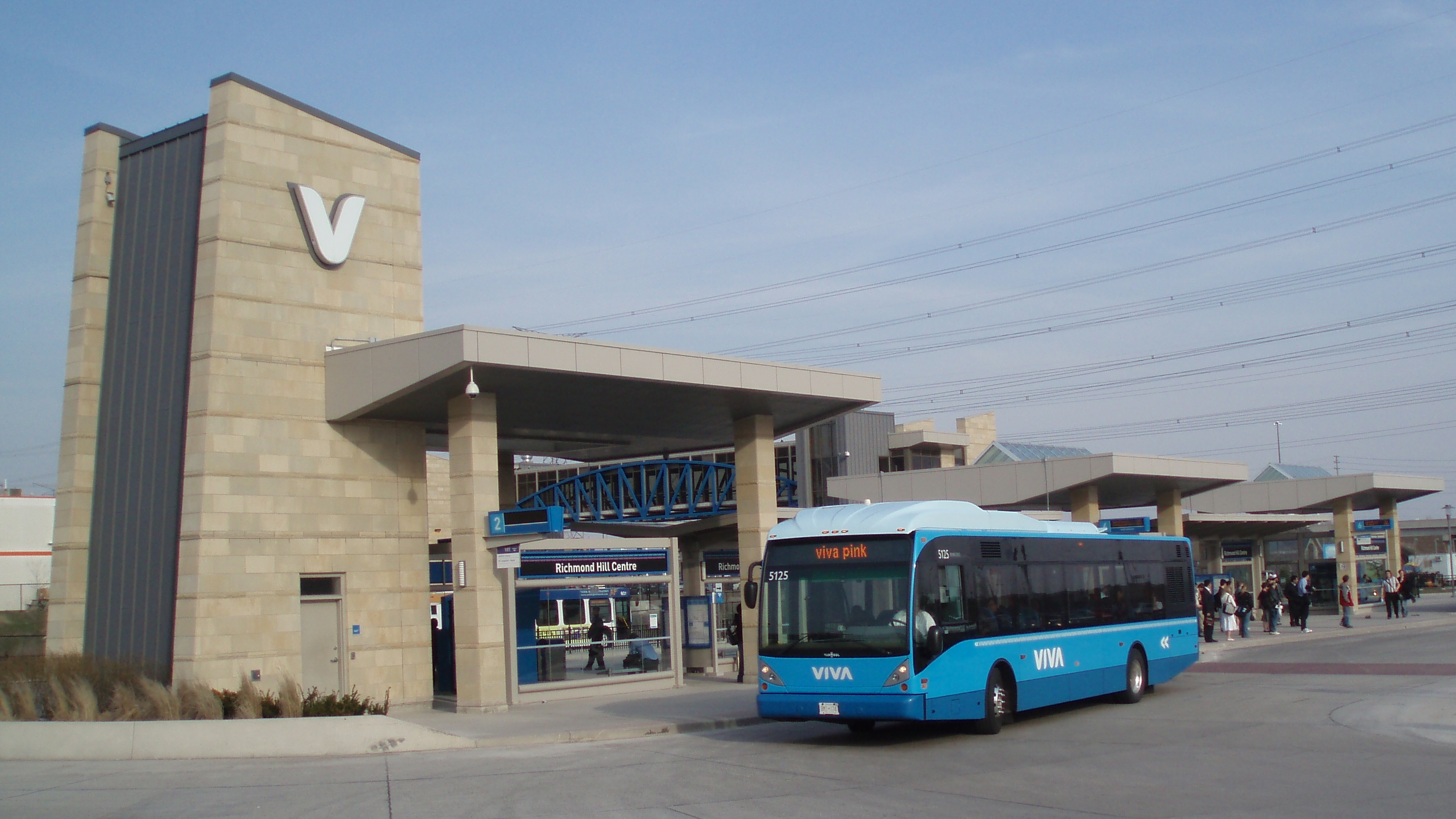
- Viva bus at Richmond Hill Centre Terminal
- Parent: York Region Transit
- Founded: September 4, 2005
- Headquarters: 50 High Tech Road, Richmond Hill, Ontario
- Locale: York Region, Ontario
- Service area: York Region along the Highway 7, Yonge Street and Davis Drive corridors
- Service type: Bus rapid transit/Quality express bus
- Alliance: Züm
- Routes: 4
- Fleet: 21 12 m (40 ft) units; 78 19 m (62 ft) units
- Fuel type: Diesel
- Operator: Miller Transit
- Website: Official website

Viva is the bus rapid transit service of York Region Transit in York Region, Ontario, Canada. Viva service forms the spine of YRT's local bus service, providing transit service across York Region with connections to northern Toronto. Viva bus routes operate on a mix of dedicated bus lanes and in mixed traffic.

Viva was designed and built using a public–private partnership (P3) model. York Region partnered with York Consortium, which comprises seven private sector firms with international experience in transit design, architecture, construction and operations. Under the terms of the partnership agreement, public sector responsibilities include establishing fare policies and service levels, ownership of all assets, and control of revenues and funding. Private sector responsibilities include providing professional staffing and procurement support, assuming risk on all approved budgets and schedules, and assisting York Region in its funding and financing requirements.

Viva opened in stages commencing September 6, 2005. The second stage opened on October 16, 2005, the third on November 20, 2005, the fourth on January 2, 2006, and the fifth on January 27, 2008.

Viva consists of a total of four routes, primarily along Yonge Street and Highway 7 in York Region. As of November 2024, Viva Blue, Viva Purple, Viva Orange, and Viva Yellow are in operation, while Viva Pink and Viva Green are former routes which are no longer in operation.

== Overview ==
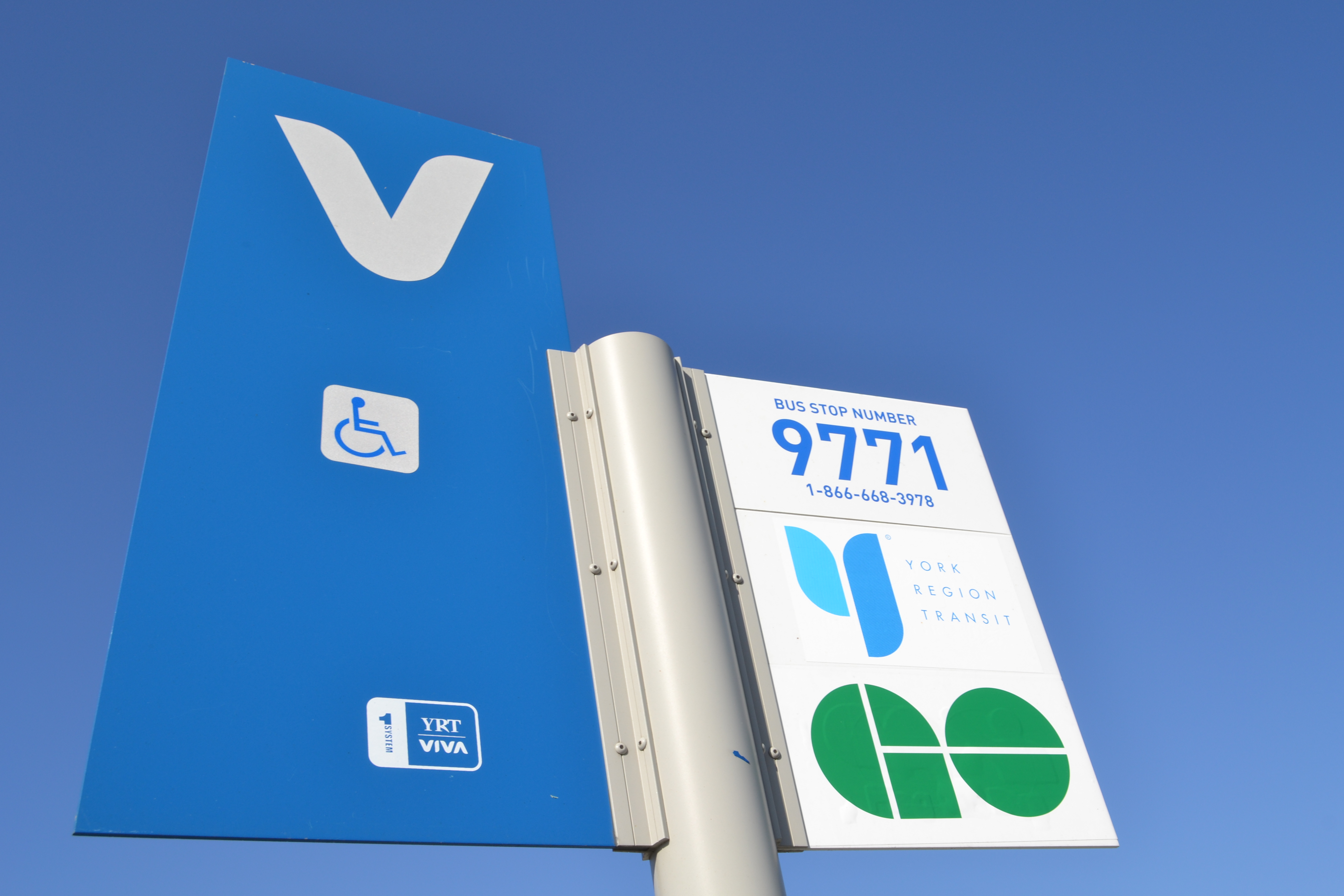
By entering the bus stop number at the RideNow webpage, riders can check vehicle arrival information via the Internet or the YRT information line.

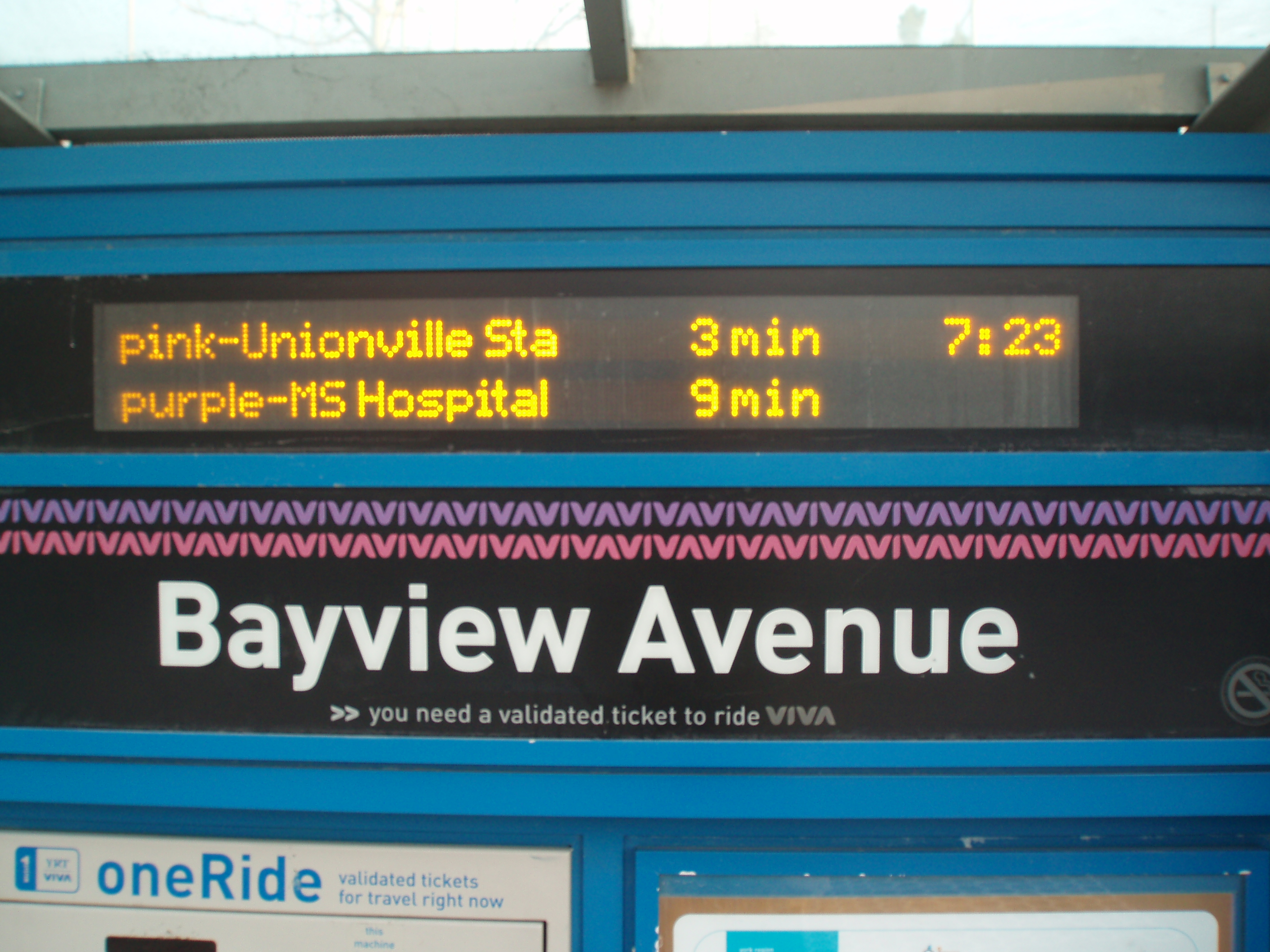
Viva's digital signage showing real-time vehicle arrival information

Viva is the first phase of York Region's rapid transit plan to reduce traffic congestion.

The service uses high-end Belgian-built Van Hool and Canadian-built NovaBus buses referred to as "rapid transit vehicles" (RTVs). To maximize speed, buses make use of existing or specially lengthened right-turn lanes bypass lineups at intersections, and of bus-only lanes and roads to avoid traffic. When behind schedule by more than a minute, they are given (conditional) priority at traffic signals.

Viva operates 18 hours a day, 7 days a week, from 5:30 am to midnight on weekdays, 6:30 am to midnight on Saturdays and 8:00 am to midnight on Sundays. During peak hours (6:30 am to 9:00 am and 4:00 pm to 6:30 pm), buses arrive every three to ten minutes depending on the route. Outside of peak hours, buses arrive 10 to 45 minutes apart.

Stops along the routes are branded as "Vivastations" and incorporate a curbside ticket vending machine and a Presto card reader (fares are on a proof-of-payment basis to speed up boarding times). A real-time display notifies passengers when the next vehicle is expected to depart. Viva stations within York Region are blue, except where they are part of a theme in historic areas. In Toronto, the stations are red.

Viva is integrated with YRT's conventional bus network. Routes connect to Toronto subway stations both in Toronto, on the Yonge branch of Line 1 Yonge–University, and within York Region itself on the University branch of Line 1, with two stations – Vaughan Metropolitan Centre and Highway 407 in Vaughan – having opened on December 17, 2017. Viva also makes connections with GO Transit at commuter rail stations and most bus terminals.

== Routes ==
Line	Opening date	Terminus		# of stops	Running time (min) (Note: Running time based on normal traffic and weather conditions, retrieved from the YRT website)	Service	Connecting services
Blue	September 4, 2005 (Finch to Bernard); November 20, 2005 (Bernard to Newmarket)	Finch	Newmarket	27	73 (off-peak); 80 (peak)	Full service	GO Transit Richmond Hill line GO Transit bus services York Region Transit Viva Orange Viva Purple Viva Yellow Toronto subway Line 1 Yonge–University
Purple	September 4, 2005 (Richmond Hill Centre to Town Centre); October 16, 2005 (Town Centre to McCowan); January 27, 2008 (McCowan to M–S Hospital); September 4, 2022 (M-S Hospital to Cornell)	Richmond Hill Centre	Cornell	27	80 (off-peak); 88 (peak)	Full service	GO Transit Richmond Hill line Stouffville line GO Transit bus services York Region Transit Viva Blue Viva Orange
Orange	October 16, 2005 (Martin Grove Road to Vaughan); December 17, 2017 (Vaughan to Richmond Hill Centre)	Martin Grove	Richmond Hill Centre	17	53 (off-peak); 55 (peak)	Full service	GO Transit GO Transit bus services York Region Transit Viva Purple Viva Blue Toronto subway Line 1 Yonge–University
Yellow	November 29, 2015	Newmarket	Davis Drive and Highway 404	7	15	Full service	GO Transit Barrie line GO Transit bus services York Region Transit Viva Blue
Former routes
Green	October 16, 2005 (Don Mills to 14th Avenue); November 20, 2005 (Warden to McCowan)	Don Mills	McCowan	12	50	Peak service (6:30–9:30; 15:30–19:00)	GO Transit Stouffville line GO Transit bus services York Region Transit Viva Purple Viva Pink Toronto subway Line 4 Sheppard
Pink	January 2, 2006	Finch	Unionville	21	56	Peak service (6:30–9:30; 15:30–19:00)	GO Transit Richmond Hill line Stouffville line GO Transit bus services York Region Transit Viva Blue Viva Orange Viva Purple Viva Green Toronto subway Line 1 Yonge–University
Planned routes
Silver	TBA	Vaughan	Newkirk Road (Richmond Hill GO Station)	16	TBA	TBA	GO Transit Richmond Hill line Barrie line GO Transit bus services York Region Transit Viva Blue Viva Orange Toronto subway Line 1 Yonge–University

As YRT’s mandate does not include local service in the city of Toronto, Viva vehicles travelling south of Steeles Avenue (the regional boundary) do not pick up passengers when travelling southbound to connect to Toronto subway stations and do not allow passengers to disembark when travelling north.

In 2009, YRT/Viva bus schedules became available on Google Transit; trip planning, detours, and fare information are available to riders over the Internet.

In April 2020, due to the COVID-19 pandemic, rush hour only routes Viva Blue A (which bypasses Richmond Hill Centre Terminal), Viva Green, and Viva Pink were temporarily suspended until further notice. On August 14, 2023, YRT confirmed that Viva Green and Viva Blue A service would not resume, followed by Viva Pink in 2024. This effectively ended service to all of Viva's rush hour only routes.

== Major locations and terminals ==
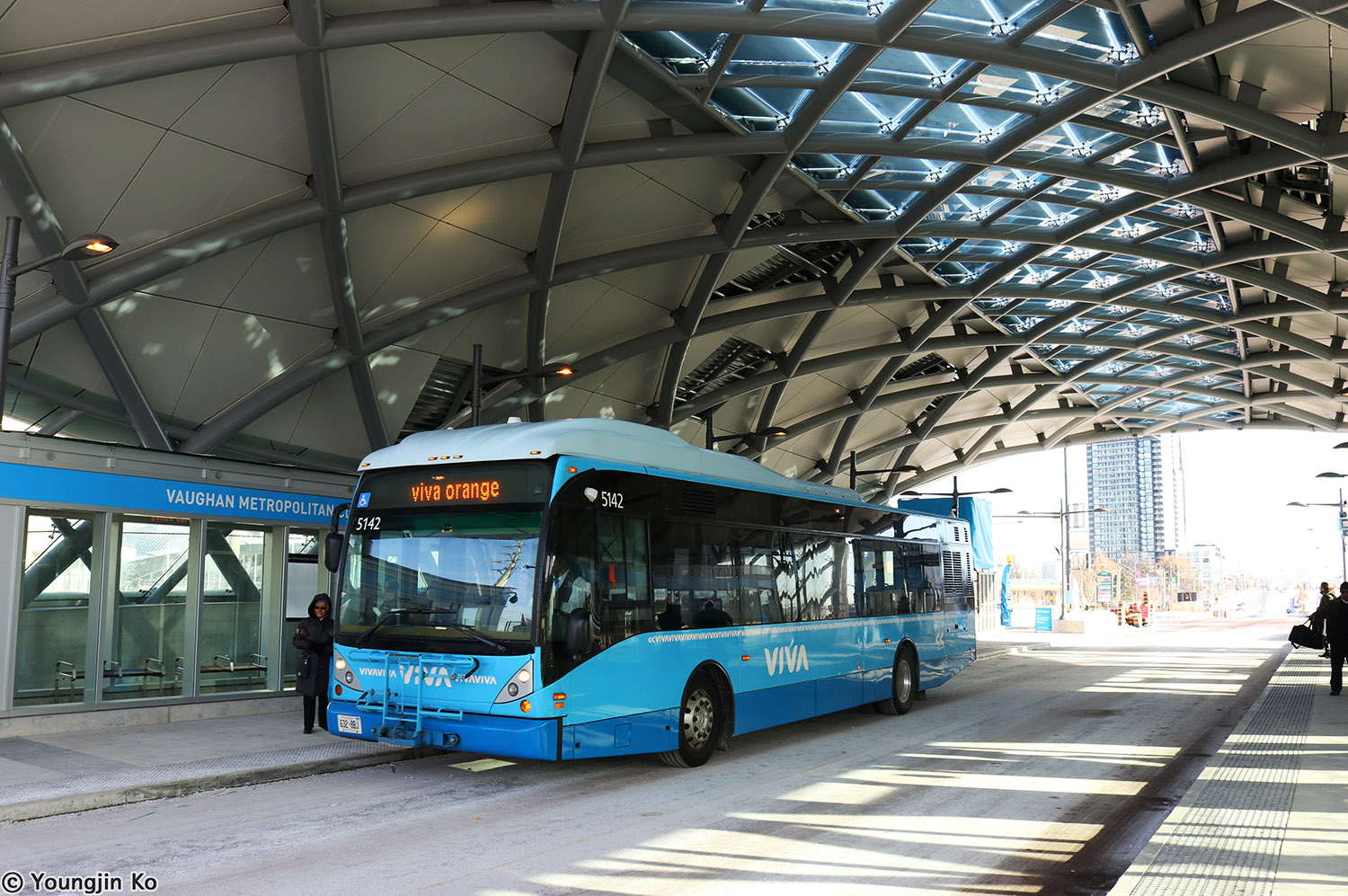
The Rapidway station at Vaughan Metropolitan Centre subway station

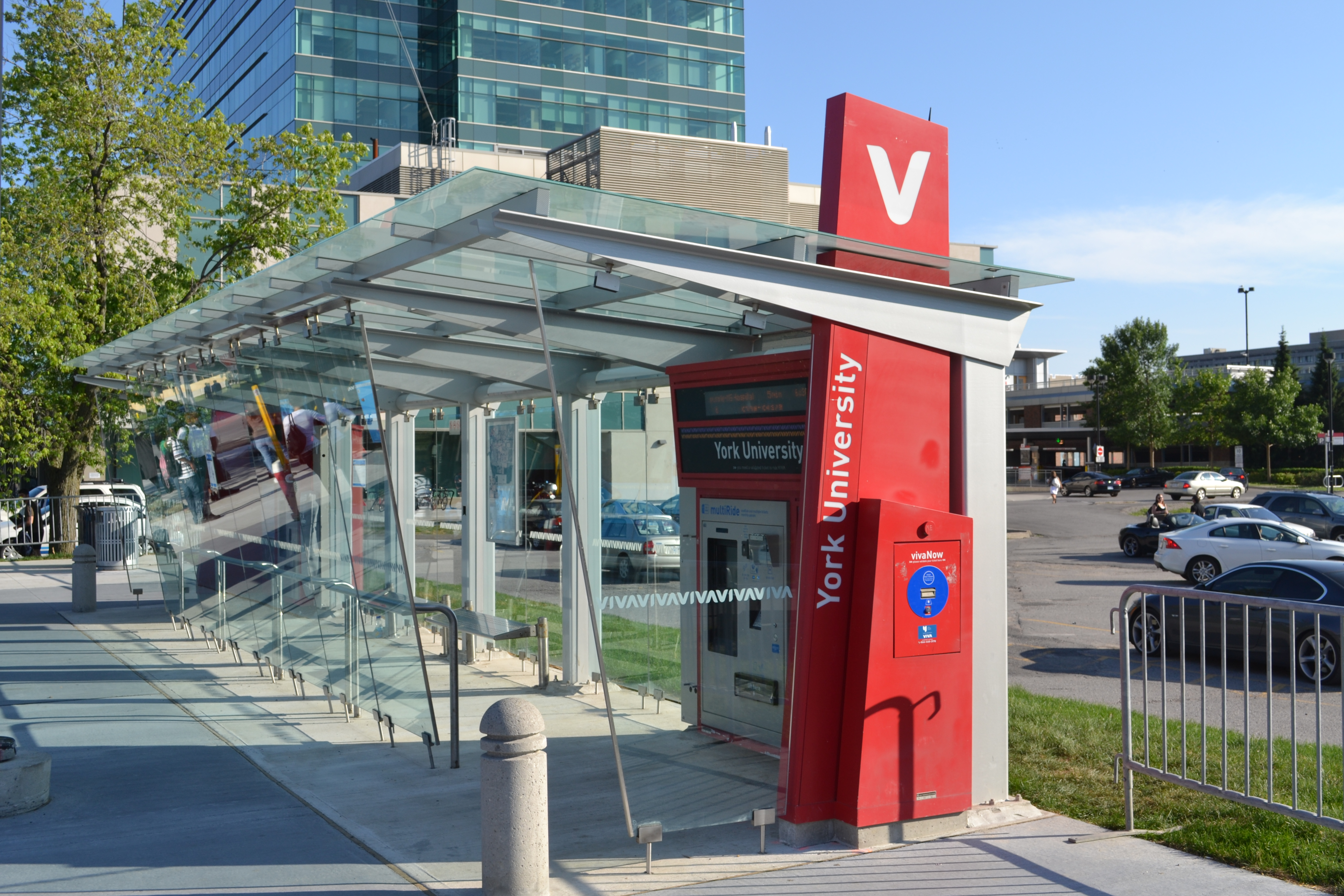
Former Viva station (no longer in use) at York University Campus

Viva operates at several major locations and terminals, with Viva stations (the names of the stations in brackets) at:

- Finch Bus Terminal – north of Finch TTC station. An elevator and Viva fare machines are available.
- Newmarket Terminal – across from Upper Canada Mall on Davis Drive, at Eagle Street West (Newmarket Bus Terminal).
- Richmond Hill Centre – Yonge Street at Highway 7/Highway 407 next to Silvercity Richmond Hill theatres. Langstaff GO Station is accessible through a pedestrian overpass.
- Promenade Terminal – in Vaughan on the north side of Promenade Mall (T&T Supermarket), on Centre Street west of Bathurst Street.
- Bernard – on east side of the mall on Yonge Street at Bernard, just north of Elgin Mills Road.
- Unionville Station – located adjacent to the Highway 407 and Kennedy Road interchange (exit 88) in the city of Markham.
- Markham-Stouffville Hospital – located near the hospital on Church St. and Country Glen Road. in Markham near 9th Line and Highway 7.
- Vaughan Metropolitan Centre – Located on Highway 7 west of Jane Street
- Cornell Terminal – located immediately south of Markham-Stouffville Hospital on Rustle Woods Avenue.

Some station shelters along Yonge Street north of Steeles along Yonge utilize Gablet roof design: Clark Avenue, John Street, Centre Street, Royal Orchard, Bay Thorn.

== Fares and payment ==
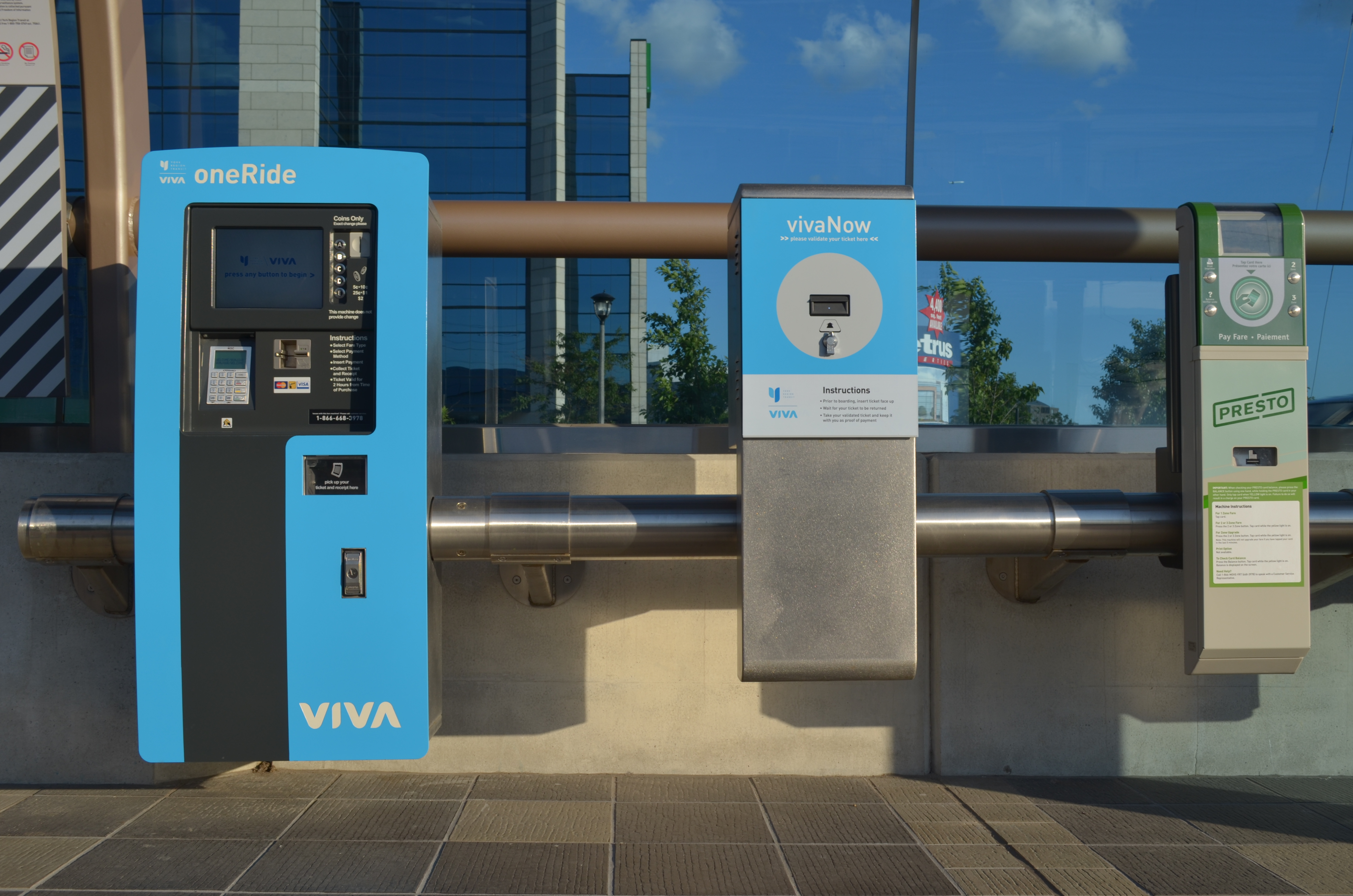
Viva ticket validation and Presto machines

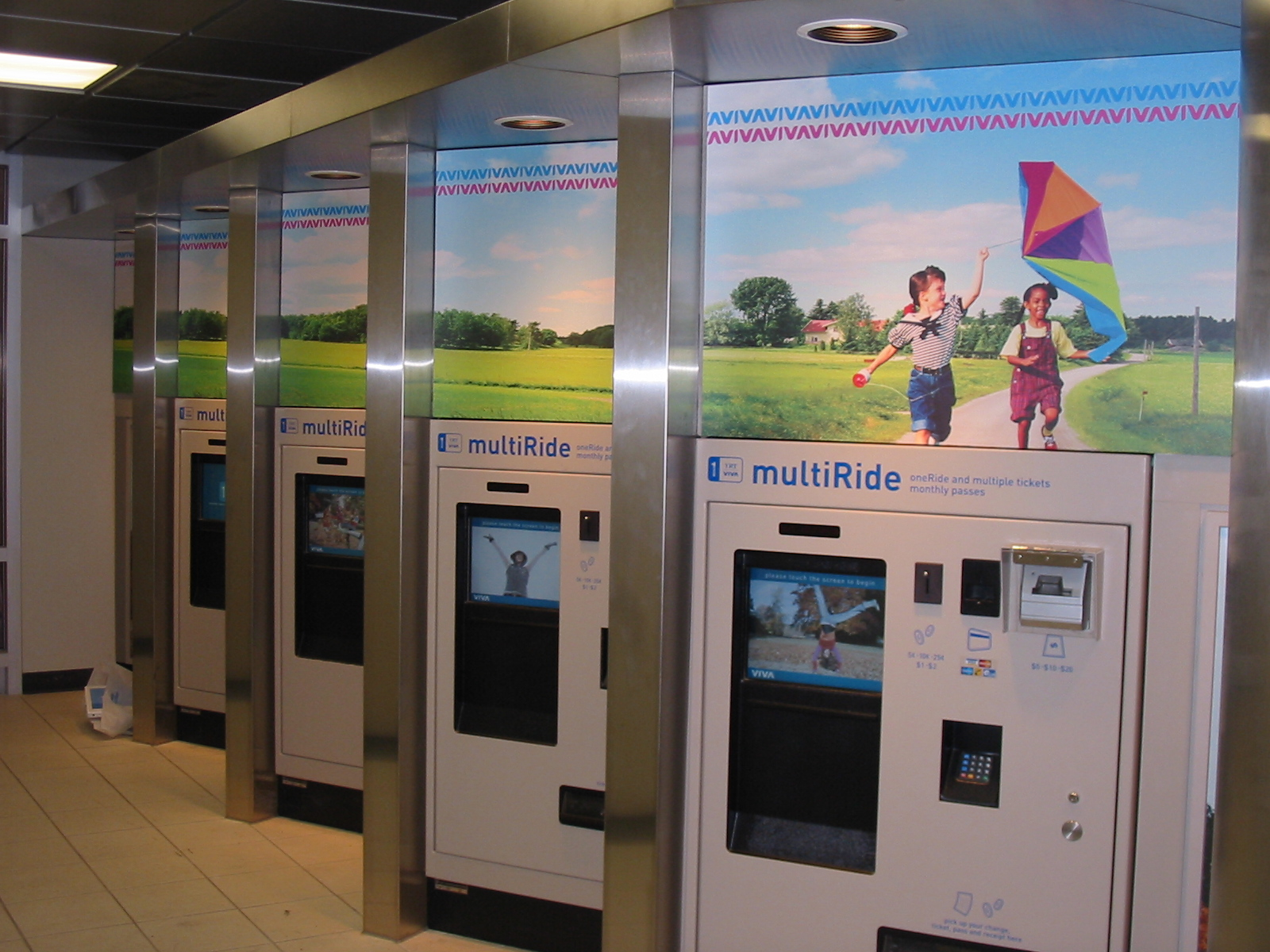
Viva ticketing machines at the Finch Bus Terminal

Viva services are covered by the same fare structure as conventional YRT bus routes. This means riders can transfer between Viva and regular YRT services without paying an additional fare. Riders can also transfer from TTC buses operating in York Region, assuming that they have paid the YRT fare when boarding the TTC bus (when in York Region) or exiting the TTC bus (when travelling to York Region from Toronto) as well as Brampton Transit's bus rapid transit counterpart, Züm. Additionally, Presto card and contactless credit and debit card paying customers who pay single Viva bus fares using their stored card balance are eligible to transfer to or from GO Transit services at discounted co-fare rates through the "Ride to GO" program.

To reduce time spent boarding passengers, Viva routes employ a proof-of-payment fare system. Drivers do not handle fare collection, and riders must purchase their single-ride tickets from "oneRide" ticket machines, available at all Vivastations and terminals, before boarding. The machines accept exact cash fares (coins only, no change provided) and credit and debit cards. Single-ride fares are valid for two hours after purchase on bus routes operated by YRT, Brampton Transit, as well as TTC-operated bus routes operating in York Region. In July 2011, the Presto card was launched in York Region, providing another payment method: riders can tap their Presto card – or, since May 2023, a contactless credit or debit card – on the Presto machine located beside the ticket vending machines prior to boarding Viva buses. In July 2017, the mobile YRT Pay app was also launched. Fares are valid for unlimited travel within two hours after purchase. YRT special constables occasionally board buses to check if passengers have paid their fares and are travelling within the two-hour time window, which, even if expiring while on board a vehicle, can result in a fine.

== Rapidways ==
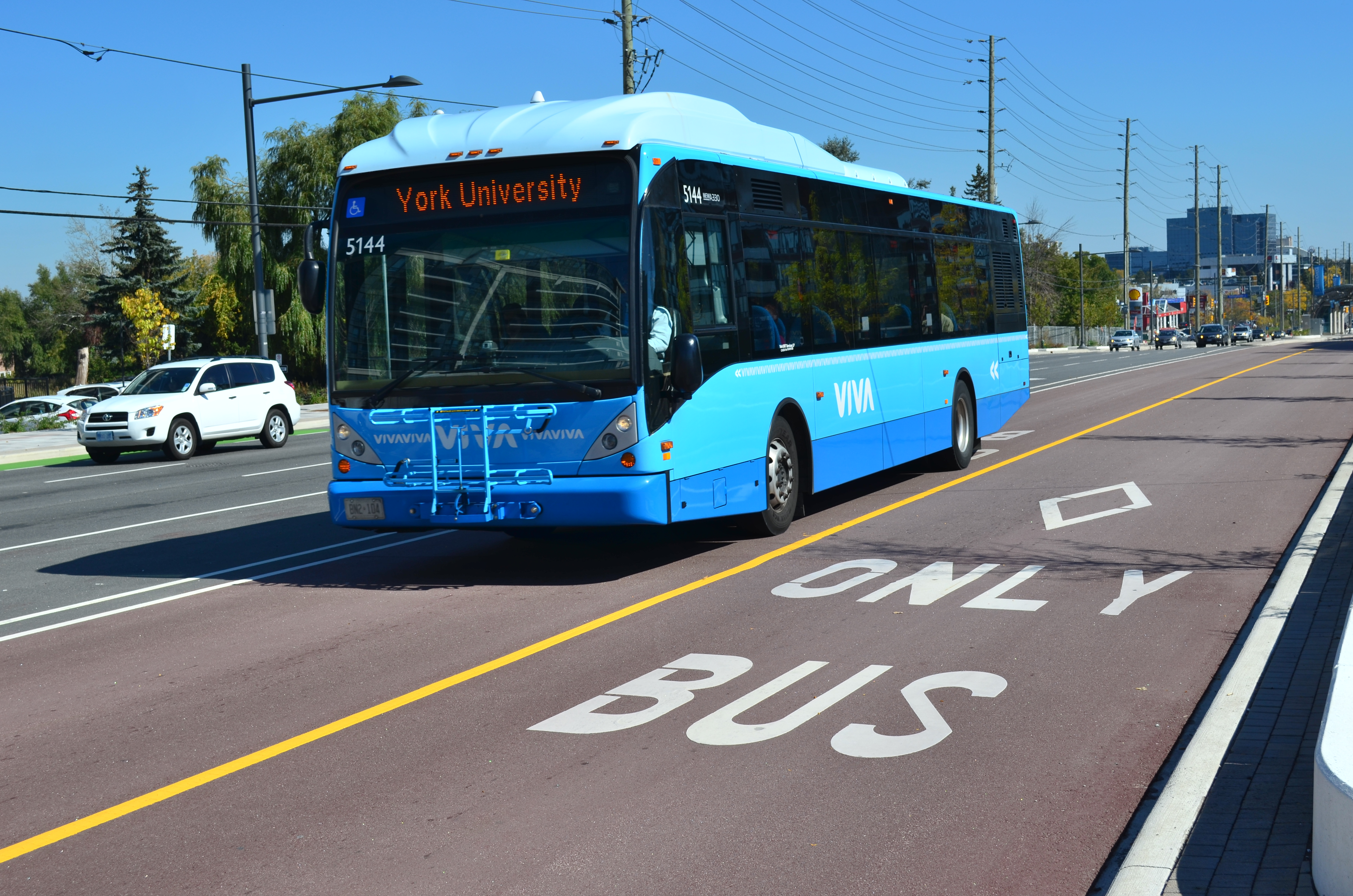
Dedicated rapidway lanes on Highway 7

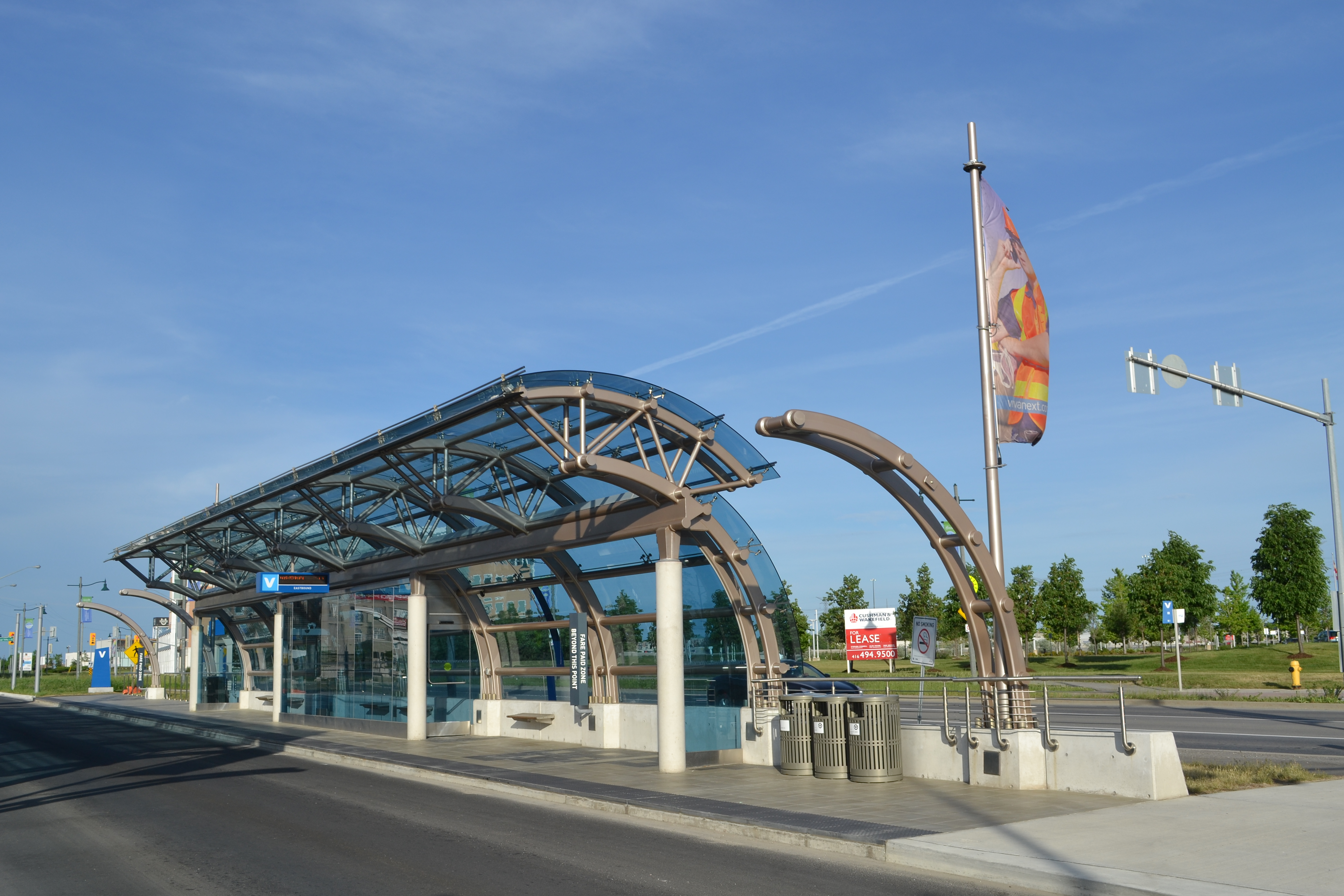
A typical rapidway station

Often referred to as a transitway or busway by other transit authorities, the term "rapidway" is used to describe the bus-only lanes being designed as part of the bus rapid transit component of the VivaNext plan. The proposed benefit of the rapidways is that Viva vehicles will be able travel faster than before, by avoiding the congestion associated with mixed traffic. While most rapidways will be located in the centre median of roadways, they may also be located curbside to accommodate certain conditions. Rapidway projects funded for construction in York Region are located on Davis Drive, Highway 7 and Yonge Street. Eventually, rapidways could be replaced with a light rail transit system.

=== History ===
In November 2008, the provincial transportation agency Metrolinx selected two infrastructure projects for construction beginning in 2009, including major components of the VivaNext plan. Metrolinx gave its final approval to a $7 billion, five-year capital plan that includes over $1 billion for construction of several rapidways.

In the spring of 2009, the Province of Ontario committed $1.4 billion for rapidway construction. The Cornell Terminal in Markham has received $5.6 million in funding through the provincial government's "Quick Wins" program.

=== Davis Drive rapidway ===
The Davis Drive rapidway in Newmarket extends 2.6 kilometres from Yonge Street to the Southlake Regional Health Centre.

In November 2009, pre-construction activities, such as utility relocation, planning and geotechnical investigations began for the Davis Drive rapidway. Additional pre-construction activities, such as soil testing, archaeological assessments, building demolition, and removal/relocation of light poles and signs will continue through to the end of 2010. The project was completed in 2015.

=== Highway 7 rapidway ===
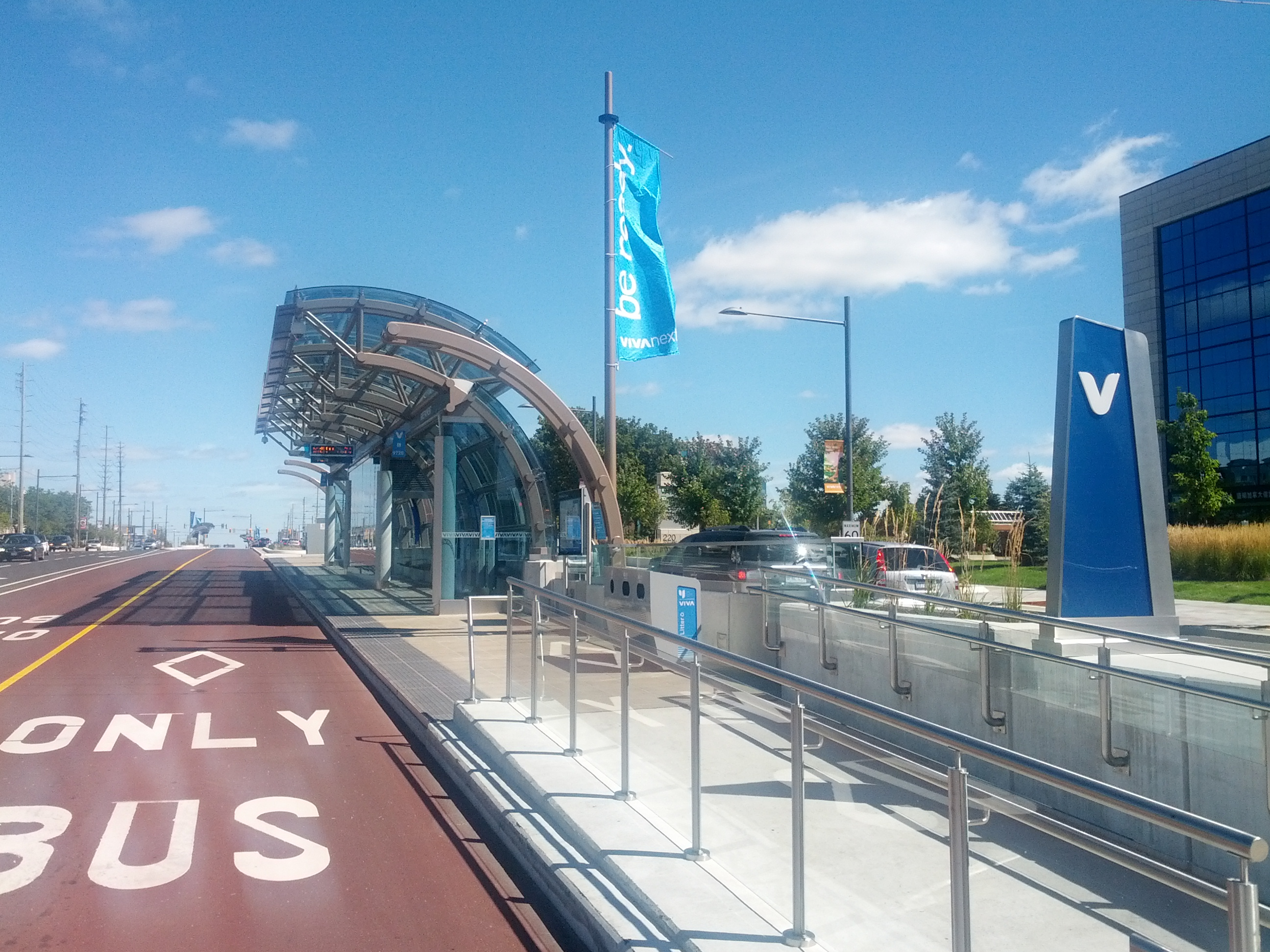
Rapidway station at West Beaver Creek and Highway 7

The Highway 7 rapidway is planned to eventually extend from Highway 50 in Vaughan to Cornell Terminal in Markham. It will connect three major urban centres in York Region; Vaughan Metropolitan Centre, Richmond Hill/Langstaff, and Markham Centre.

All stops from Wigwoss-Helen in Vaughan to Post Rd in Markham are currently operational as of January 2020.

=== Yonge Street rapidway ===
The Yonge Street rapidway will extend north along Yonge Street from Richmond Hill Centre Terminal at Highway 7 to Green Lane in Newmarket.

The first segment, which extends from Davis Drive to Sawmill Valley Drive/Savage Road in Newmarket, opened on January 5, 2020. The second segment between Highway 7 and 19th Avenue/Gamble Road opened in December 2020.

== Vehicles and fleet rosters ==
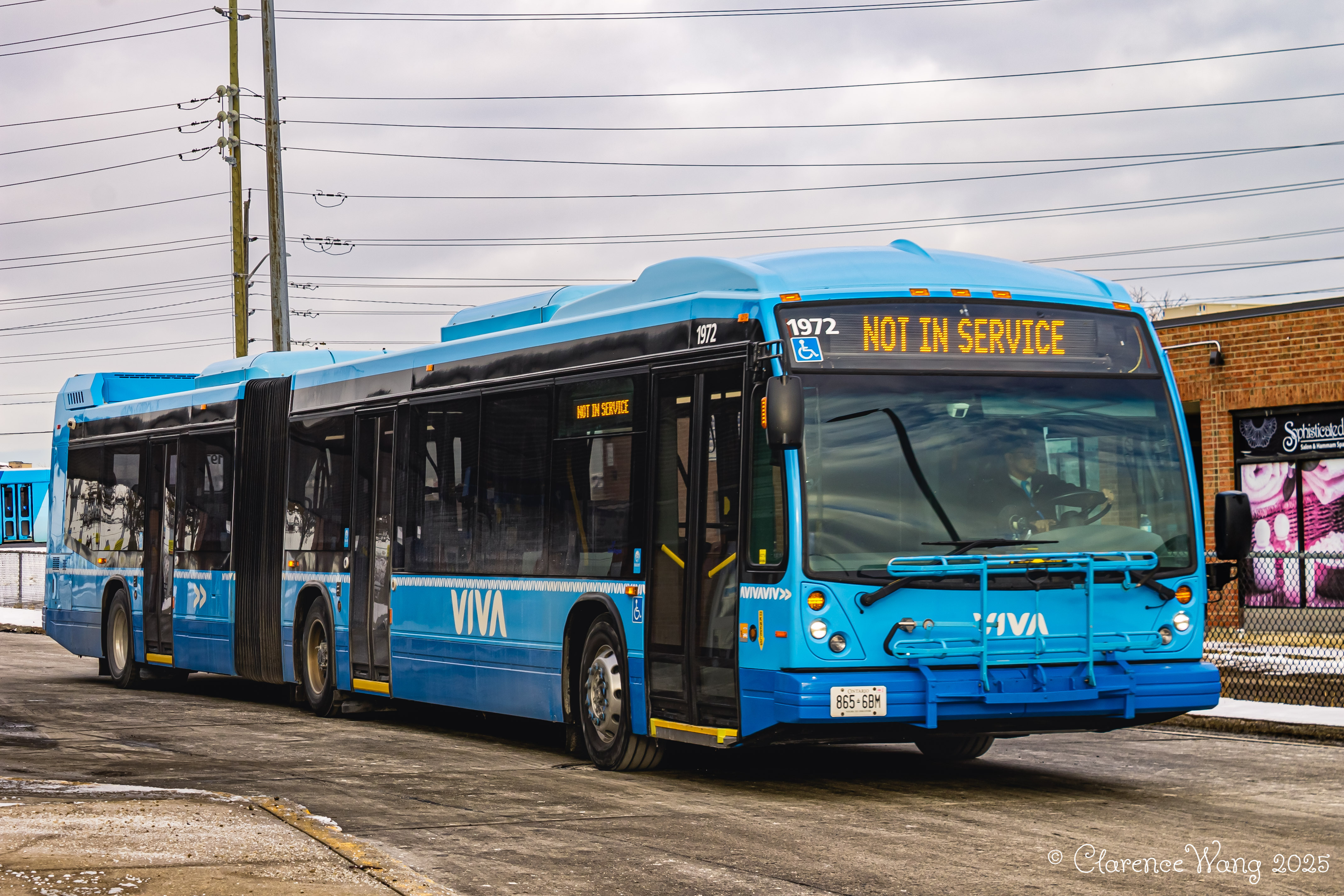
Viva's vehicles are intended to be more comfortable than usual for public transport in North America.

Viva's buses are referred to as Rapid Transit Vehicles (RTVs) by York Region Transit. Viva operates 15 Van Hool buses, 68 Nova buses, and 16 New Flyer buses. All Viva vehicles are wheelchair-accessible.

Make	Description
Van Hool	A330
Nova Bus	Articulated LFS
New Flyer	XD40
New Flyer	Articulated XE60
Former Buses
Van Hool	Articulated AG300
Nova Bus	Articulated LFX

== Future extensions ==
The VivaNext plan includes the Yonge North Subway Extension of the Yonge subway line north from Finch to Richmond Hill Centre. The Environmental Project Report for the Yonge North Subway Extension was unconditionally approved by the Ministry of the Environment in 2009. This 6.7-kilometre extension is one of the top 15 priority projects of Metrolinx, the provincial transportation agency. A conceptual design contract was initiated in 2010 to maintain momentum on the project and provide a stronger foundation for moving it forward.

=== Viva Network Expansion Plan (VNEP) ===
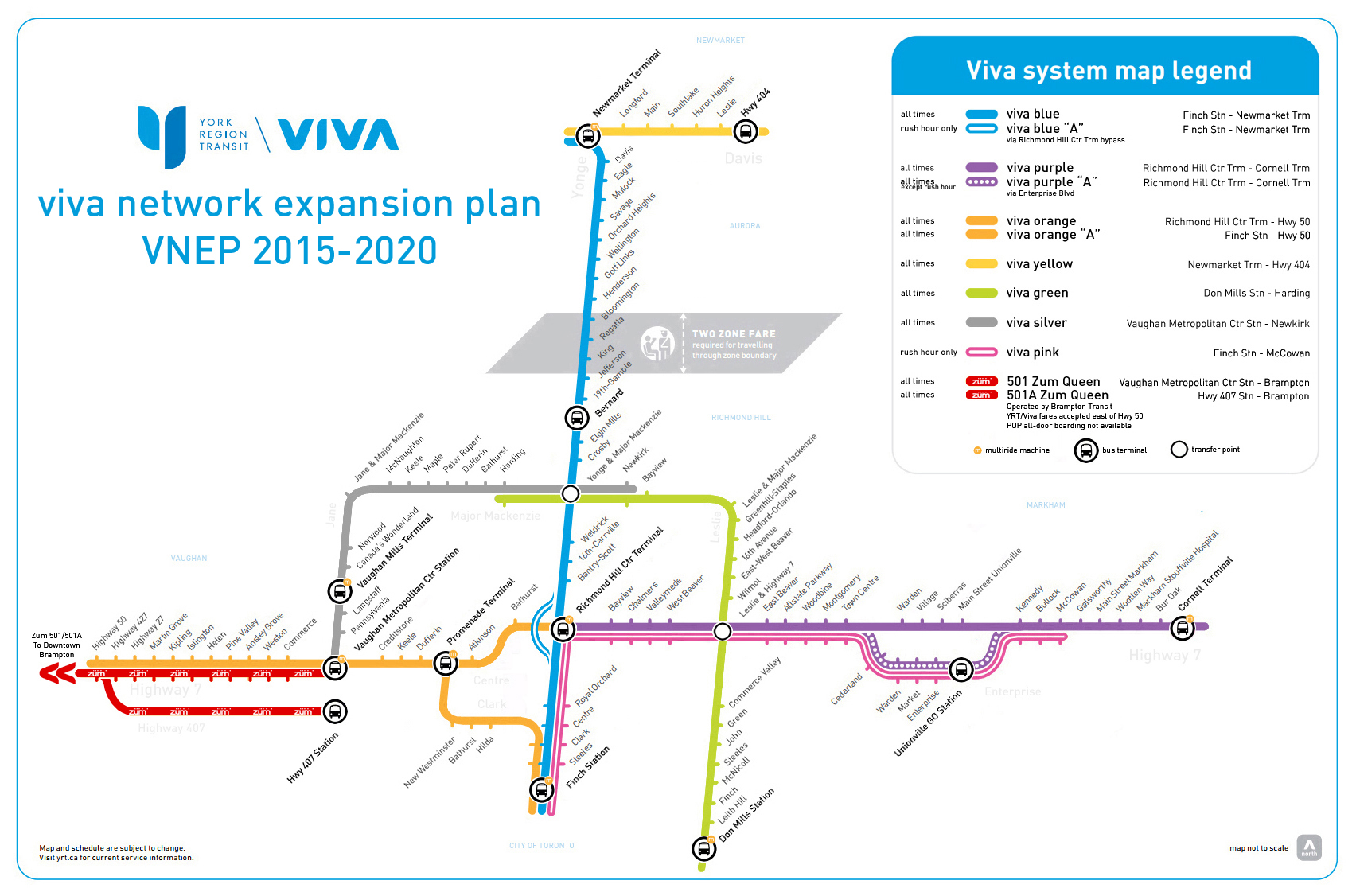
Viva Network Expansion Plan (VNEP)

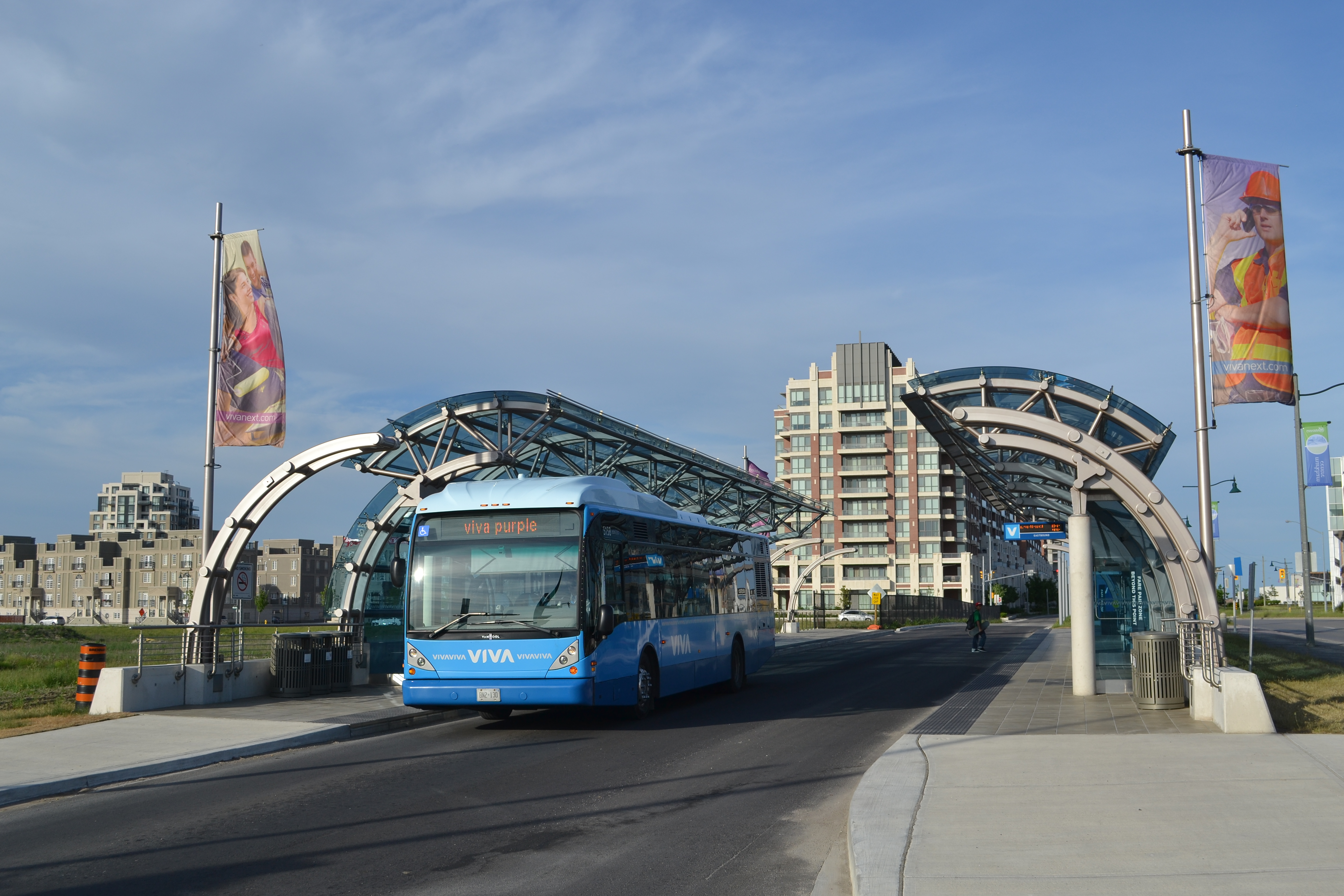
The first Viva station at Warden

The Viva Network Expansion Plan (VNEP) was York Region's plan to expand the size of Viva's bus rapid transit network. Beginning 2015 through to 2020, the system would have expanded to include six full-service lines and one rush hour line. These expansion plans would have complemented the region's new bus rapidways and subway lines as they opened.

By 2020, the following lines were planned to be in service:

- Viva Blue (Yonge) between Finch Subway – Newmarket Terminal (all times), with a branch bypassing Richmond Hill Centre (rush hour only).
- Viva Purple (Highway 7 East) between Richmond Hill Centre – Cornell Terminal (all times), with a branch detouring to Enterprise Blvd (all times except rush hour).
- Viva Orange (Highway 7 West) between Richmond Hill Centre – Highway 50 (all times), with a branch between Finch Subway – Highway 50 (all times).
- Viva Yellow (Davis) between Newmarket Terminal – Highway 404 (all times).
- Viva Green (Leslie / Major Mackenzie East) between Don Mills Subway – Harding (all times).
- Viva Silver (Jane / Major Mackenzie West) between Vaughan Metropolitan Centre Subway – Newkirk (all times).
- Viva Pink (Yonge / Highway 7 East) between Finch Subway – McCowan (rush hour only).

As of 2022, Viva Orange has not been extended to Highway 50 and the branch to the Finch subway was not accomplished. Viva Green was not rerouted to run along Leslie Street and Major Mackenzie East. Viva Silver was not established.

In 2022, York Region Transit will begin service on the Viva Silver route, which will serve Vaughan Metropolitan Centre north on Jane Street to Major Mackenzie Drive, and east to Richmond Hill GO Station.

=== Yonge North subway expansion plan ===
The future Yonge North subway expansion is planned to run 6.8 kilometres (4.2 mi) kilometres north from Finch station in Toronto along Yonge Street, which straddles the Markham/Vaughan boundary within York, to the Richmond Hill Centre Terminal at Highway 7 and will include four stations in York. On completion the southern terminus of Viva Blue BRT will likely move from Finch Station to Richmond Hill Terminal (which will likely serve as bus connection for High Tech Subway Station).

== 2008 driver strike ==
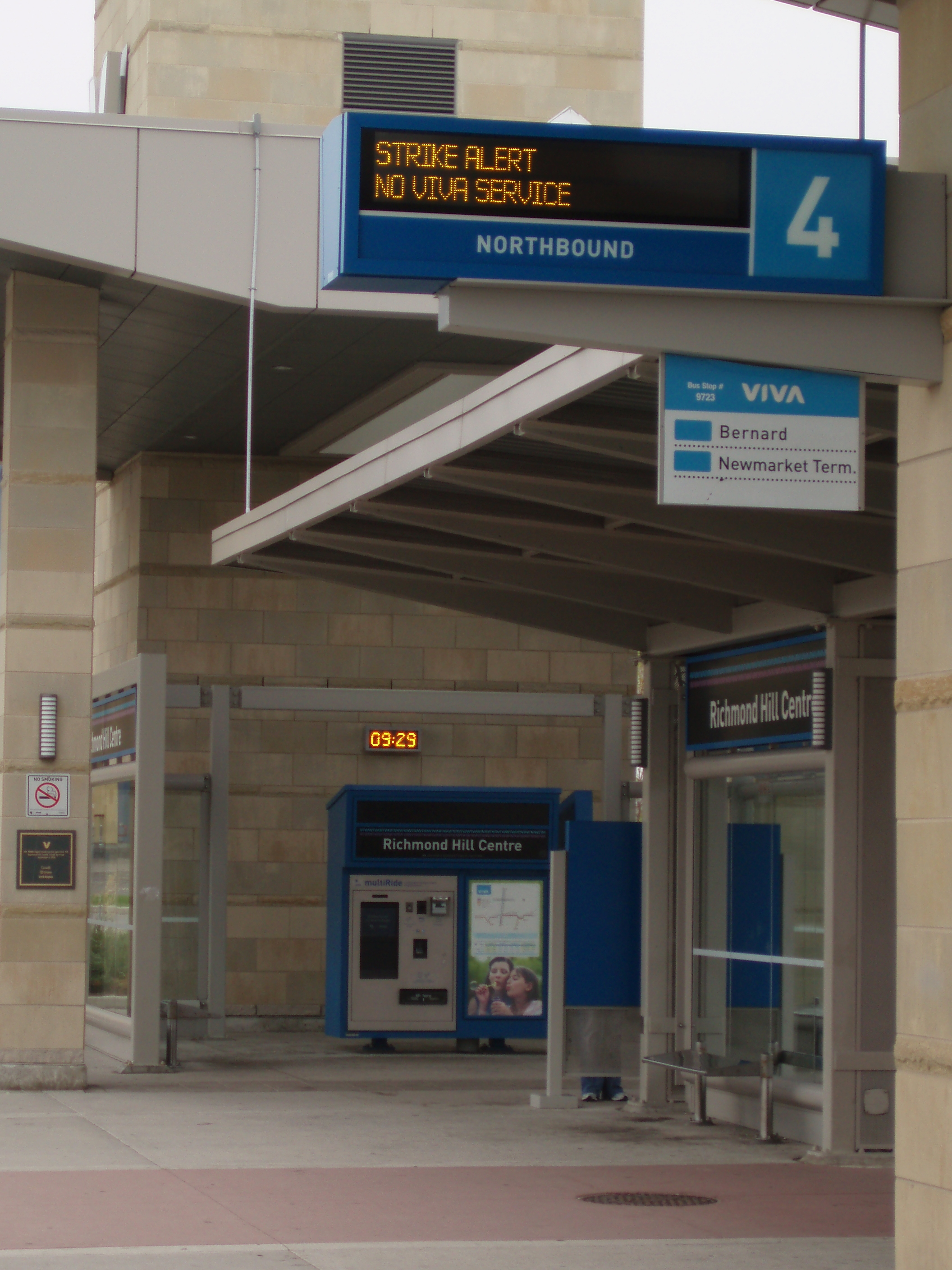
Vivasmart display alerting passengers that no Viva service is available during the strike.

Viva's 170 bus operators are members of Amalgamated Transit Union Local 113, which also represents most unionized staff (over 10000 drivers, ticket collectors and maintenance workers) for the TTC.

On September 25, 2008, 160 operators walked off the job at 4 a.m. Sixty-one per cent of the operators rejected the contract that had been offered the previous week. There was no Viva service during the strike, although 40 per cent of regular YRT routes continued to operate as its drivers are represented by a different local of the ATU that did not go on strike.

On October 10, 2008, 65% of the operators voted to accept the contract that they rejected on September 25, ending the 16-day strike. Service resumed at 6 a.m. on October 11, 2008.

== See also ==
- List of bus rapid transit systems
