= Martin Smith (figure skater) =

Canadian ice dancer

Personal information
- Born: January 14, 1968 (age 58)

Figure skating career
- Country: Canada
- Partner: Michelle McDonald; Jo-Anne Borlase; Melanie Cole
- Skating club: Granite Club; Kitchener-Waterloo SC
- Retired: 1992

Martin Smith (born January 14, 1968) is a Canadian former competitive ice dancer. With Jo-Anne Borlase, he is the 1989 NHK Trophy bronze medalist, 1989 Skate America bronze medalist, and 1990 Canadian national champion. With Michelle McDonald, he won the 1991 Canadian national title.

== Career ==
Early in his career, Smith skated in partnership with Melanie Cole. The two placed fourth at the 1986 World Junior Championships, which took place in December 1985 in Sarajevo, and won the Canadian national junior title the same season. The following season, they competed on the senior level, placing 8th at the 1986 Skate America.

In 1987, Smith teamed up with Jo-Anne Borlase. In their second season together, they won bronze at the Canadian Championships. In their third, they took bronze at the 1989 Skate America and 1989 NHK Trophy before winning the national title. They finished 7th at their final event together, the 1990 World Championships in Halifax, Nova Scotia.

Smith competed the next two seasons with Michelle McDonald. The two won the 1991 Canadian national title but dropped to third in 1992 and missed out on the Olympics.

Smith represented the Kitchener-Waterloo Skating Club (1986) and the Granite Club (1990 to 1992).

== Competitive highlights ==
=== With McDonald ===
International
Event	1990–91	1991–92
World Championships	16th	
NHK Trophy		5th
Skate Canada		4th
National
Canadian Championships	1st	3rd

=== With Borlase ===
International
Event	1987–88	1988–89	1989–90
World Championships			7th
Danse sur Glace de Grenoble	8th	7th	6th
International de Paris		4th	
NHK Trophy			3rd
Skate America		5th	3rd
Skate Canada	7th		
St. Ivel International	6th		
National
Canadian Championships	4th	3rd	1st

=== With Cole ===
International
Event	1985–86	1986–87
Skate America		8th
International: Junior
World Junior Championships	4th	
Merano Autumn Trophy	1st	
National
Canadian Championships	1st J	7th
J = Junior level
