= Mark Mitchell (Canadian figure skater) =

Canadian ice dancer

Mark Mitchell is a Canadian ice dancer who competed with Michelle McDonald of British Columbia. The two placed sixth at the 1988 Skate America, won silver at the 1989 Canadian Championships, and finished 11th at the 1989 World Championships in Paris. The following season, they won silver at the 1989 Skate Canada International, repeated as national silver medalists, and placed 9th at the 1990 World Championships in Halifax, Nova Scotia, Canada. They parted ways after the 1990 Goodwill Games, where they finished fifth.

== Competitive highlights ==
(with McDonald)

International
Event	1988–89	1989–90
World Championships	11th	9th
Goodwill Games		5th
International de Paris		5th
Skate America	6th	
Skate Canada International		2nd
Skate Electric	4th	
National
Canadian Championships	2nd	2nd
