= Cambli International Thunder 1 =

Canadian armored police vehicle

Thunder 1
- Type: Non-military armored vehicle
- Place of origin: Canada

Service history
- In service: 2010
- Used by: See Operators

Production history
- Manufacturer: Cambri Group

Specifications
- Mass: 28,000 lb (13,000 kg)
- Crew: 10-14
- Main armament: 12 gunports
- Engine: Cummins; 330 hp (335 PS; 246 kW) @ 2800 rpm
- Transmission: Ford 6R140 6-speed
- Suspension: Live axle
- Operational range: Unknown
- Maximum speed: 80 mph (128 km/h)

The Cambli Thunder 1 is an armoured tactical vehicle built by Cambli Group Inc., a Canadian company based in Saint-Jean-sur-Richelieu, Quebec.

Designed for law enforcement and Special Weapons and Tactics (SWAT) teams, the Cambli Thunder 1 is a 4x4 vehicle that uses an International 7500 SFA chassis. The vehicle’s armoured body and bulletproof glass provide ballistic protection against high-caliber weapons.

Key features and specifications include:

- Chassis: International 7500 SFA
- Engine: Cummins, 330 horsepower
- Crew capacity: up to 14 people
- Armament: 12 gunports, 5 per side,two on the back ,allowing for personnel to fire from within the vehicle

== Operators ==
The Thunder 1 has been adopted by several Canadian police forces, including:

- Vancouver Police Department – 1 delivered in 2010 from tender after 2008
- York Regional Police – 1 delivered in 2011
- Ontario Provincial Police – 2 delivered in 2012
- Service de police de la Ville de Québec – 1 delivered in 2012
- Service de police de la Ville de Montréal – 1 delivered in 2013
- Calgary Police Service – 1 delivered in 2019

== See also ==
Similar armoured vehicles include:

- Alvis Saracen
- Saxon (vehicle)
- Cadillac Gage Ranger
- Mercedes-Benz Unimog U5000
- Armoured car (military)
- Armoured car (VIP)
