= Michael Farrington =

Canadian ice dancer

Personal information
- Born: August 11, 1966 (age 59) Barrie, Ontario

Figure skating career
- Country: Canada
- Partner: Pamela Watson; Melanie Cole; Michelle McDonald; Kim Campbell; Christine Horton
- Skating club: Upper Canada Skating Club; Scarborough FSC

Michael Farrington (born August 11, 1966) is a Canadian former competitive ice dancer. With Melanie Cole, he is the 1988 Golden Spin of Zagreb champion, 1988 Skate Canada International bronze medalist, and 1988 Canadian national bronze medalist. The two competed at the 1988 Winter Olympics in Calgary, finishing 16th.

== Career ==
Skating with Christine Horton, Farrington won the novice bronze medal at the 1981 Canadian Championships. In December 1982, they placed fifth at the 1983 World Junior Championships in Sarajevo, Yugoslavia. They were the junior bronze medalists at the 1983 Canadian Championships. The following season, they finished fourth at the 1984 World Junior Championships in December 1983 in Sapporo, Japan, and became the Canadian national junior champions. Farrington represented Scarborough FSC.

With Kim Campbell, he placed sixth at the 1985 Morzine Avoriaz in France. With Michelle McDonald, he won bronze at the 1986 Nebelhorn Trophy in Germany and placed sixth at the 1986 Skate Canada International.

In 1987, Farrington teamed up with Melanie Cole at the Upper Canada Skating Club. In their first season together, they won bronze at the Canadian Championships and were named in Canada's Olympic team. They finished 16th at the 1988 Winter Olympics, which took place in February in Calgary, Alberta. In March, they placed 15th at the 1988 World Championships in Budapest, Hungary.

Cole/Farrington competed one more season together, winning gold at the 1988 Golden Spin of Zagreb and bronze at the 1988 Skate Canada International.

Farrington placed 5th at the 1989 Nations Cup with Pamela Watson.

== Results ==
=== With Watson ===
International
| Event | 1989–90 |
|---|---|
| Nations Cup | 5th |

=== With Cole ===
International
| Event | 1987–88 | 1988–89 |
|---|---|---|
| Winter Olympics | 16th | |
| World Championships | 15th | |
| Golden Spin of Zagreb | | 1st |
| Skate Canada International | | 3rd |
National
| Canadian Championships | 3rd | |

=== With McDonald ===
International
| Event | 1985-86 | 1986–87 |
|---|---|---|
| Nebelhorn Trophy | | 3rd |
| Skate Canada International | | 6th |
National
| Canadian Championships | 4th | |

=== With Campbell ===
International
| Event | 1985 |
|---|---|
| Morzine Avoriaz | 6th |
National
| Canadian Championships | 4th |

=== With Horton ===
International: Junior
| Event | 1982–83 | 1983–84 |
|---|---|---|
| World Junior Championships | 5th | 4th |
National
| Canadian Championships | 3rd J | 1st J |
