= Figure skating at the 1990 Goodwill Games =

1990 Goodwill Games
- Date: July 20 – August 5, 1990
- Season: 1990–91
- Location: Seattle, USA

Champions
- Men's singles: (Canada) Kurt Browning
- Ladies' singles: (United States) Kristi Yamaguchi
- Pairs: (Soviet Union) Ekaterina Gordeeva / Sergei Grinkov
- Ice dance: (Soviet Union) Marina Klimova / Sergei Ponomarenko
- Next: 1994 Goodwill Games

The figure skating competition at the 1990 Goodwill Games was held in Seattle, USA between July 20 and August 5, 1990. Medals were awarded in the disciplines of men's singles, ladies' singles, pair skating, and ice dancing.

== Results ==
=== Men ===
Rank	Name	Nation	TP	FS	TFP
1	Kurt Browning	Canada	2	1	2.0
2	Viktor Petrenko	Soviet Union	1	2	2.5
3	Todd Eldredge	United States	5	3	5.5
4	Paul Wylie	United States	4	4	6.0
5	Viacheslav Zagorodniuk	Soviet Union	3	5	6.5
6	Christopher Bowman	United States	6	6	9.0
7	Michael Slipchuk	Canada	7	7	10.5
WD	Grzegorz Filipowski	Poland	8		

=== Ladies ===
Rank	Name	Nation	TP	FS	TFP
1	Kristi Yamaguchi	United States	3	1	2.5
2	Jill Trenary	United States	1	2	2.5
3	Surya Bonaly	France	4	4	6.0
4	Karen Preston	Canada	7	3	6.5
5	Nancy Kerrigan	United States	2	6	7.0
6	Tatiana Rachkova	Soviet Union	6	5	8.0
7	Natalia Lebedeva	Soviet Union	5	7	9.5
8	Margot Bion	Canada	8	8	12.0

=== Pairs ===
Rank	Name	Nation	TP	FS	TFP
1	Ekaterina Gordeeva / Sergei Grinkov	Soviet Union	1	1	1.5
2	Natalia Mishkutenok / Artur Dmitriev	Soviet Union	2	2	3.0
3	Elena Bechke / Denis Petrov	Soviet Union	3	3	4.5
4	Natasha Kuchiki / Todd Sand	United States	4	4	6.0
5	Michelle Menzies / Kevin Wheeler	Canada	5	5	7.5
6	Sharon Carz / Doug Williams	United States	6	6	9.0
7	Calla Urbanski / Mark Naylor	United States	7	7	10.5
8	Patricia MacNeil / Cory Watson	Canada	8	8	12.0

=== Ice dancing ===
Rank	Name	Nation	CD	OD	FD	TFP
1	Marina Klimova / Sergei Ponomarenko	Soviet Union	1	1	1	2.0
2	Maya Usova / Alexander Zhulin	Soviet Union	2	2	2	4.0
3	Susan Wynne / Joseph Druar	United States	3	4	3	6.6
4	Oksana Grishuk / Evgeni Platov	Soviet Union	4	3	4	7.4
5	Michelle McDonald / Mark Mitchell	Canada	6	6	5	11.0
6	April Sargent / Russ Witherby	United States	5	5	7	12.0
7	Jacqueline Petr / Mark Janoschak	Canada	7	7	6	13.0
