= Michelle McDonald =

Canadian ice dancer

Personal information
- Born: February 1, 1964 (age 62)

Figure skating career
- Country: Canada
- Partner: Martin Smith; Mark Mitchell; Michael Farrington; Patrick Mandley
- Retired: c. 1992

Michelle McDonald (born February 1, 1964) is a Canadian former competitive ice dancer. With Martin Smith, she is the 1991 Canadian national champion. With Mark Mitchell, she is the 1989 Skate Canada International silver medalist and a two-time national silver medalist. In total, she competed at three World Championships, achieving her best result (9th) in 1990.

== Career ==
McDonald won the 1983 Canadian national junior title with Patrick Mandley. They finished 7th at the 1983 Nebelhorn Trophy and 9th at the 1984 Skate Canada International.

With Michael Farrington, she won bronze at the 1986 Nebelhorn Trophy and placed sixth at the 1986 Skate Canada International.

Her next partner was Mark Mitchell. The two placed sixth at the 1988 Skate America, won silver at the 1989 Canadian Championships, and finished 11th at the 1989 World Championships in Paris. The following season, they won silver at the 1989 Skate Canada International, repeated as national silver medalists, and placed 9th at the 1990 World Championships in Halifax, Nova Scotia, Canada. They parted ways after the 1990 Goodwill Games, where they finished fifth.

McDonald competed the next two seasons with Martin Smith. They won the 1991 Canadian national title and finished 16th at the 1991 World Championships in Munich, Germany. They dropped to third at the 1992 Canadian Championships and were not included in Canada's team to the 1992 Winter Olympics.

== Competitive highlights ==
=== With Smith ===
International
Event	1990–91	1991–92
World Championships	16th	
NHK Trophy		5th
Skate Canada		4th
National
Canadian Championships	1st	3rd

=== With Mitchell ===
International
Event	1988–89	1989–90
World Championships	11th	9th
Goodwill Games		5th
International de Paris		5th
Skate America	6th	
Skate Canada International		2nd
Skate Electric	4th	
National
Canadian Championships	2nd	2nd

=== With Farrington ===
International
Event	1986–87
Nebelhorn Trophy	3rd
Skate Canada International	6th

=== With Mandley ===
International
Event	1981–82	1982–83	1983–84	1984–85
Nebelhorn Trophy			7th	
Skate Canada International				9th
National
Canadian Championships	3rd J	1st J		
