= Viva Silver =

Future BRT line in York Region

Overview
- System: YRT/Viva
- Operator: Tok Transit
- Status: Proposed
- Began service: TBD

Route
- Route type: Bus rapid transit
- Locale: York Region
- Communities served: Richmond Hill; Vaughan
- Start: Vaughan Metropolitan Centre
- End: Richmond Hill GO
- Stops: 16

Viva Silver is a bus rapid transit route planned by York Region Transit to operate in Regional Municipality of York, Ontario, Canada. It is proposed as part of the Viva Rapid Transit service, with a connection to Vaughan Metropolitan Centre station on the Line 1 Yonge–University subway in Toronto.

The planned route is from the Vaughan Metropolitan Centre Terminal north along Jane Street to Major Mackenzie Drive, then east to Richmond Hill GO Station. It will include a transit signal priority system.

The route is part of York Region Transit's "frequent transit network" enhancements, in which Jane Street, Leslie Street, and Major Mackenzie Drive are considered top priority transit corridors for 2016. Frequency of York Region Transit rush hour bus service operating on those corridors will be progressively increased before implementation of the Viva service in order to increase ridership. The expected route service frequency is 10 minutes. When first opened, the route is expected to have curbside stops while dedicated BRT lanes would be installed later.

Implementation of this route will require capital costs of about CA$23 million in 2017, and will cost about CA$6 million annually to operate. Service will require a fleet of 10 Viva buses.

== Stations ==
The principal stops are Vaughan Metropolitan Centre Terminal, Vaughan Mills, Canada's Wonderland, Richmond Hill GO Station, and the Yonge Street corridor. It would result in the elimination of route 760 bus service.

The Vaughan Metropolitan subway station concourse is accessible from the Vaughan Metropolitan Centre Terminal, which is located on the central median of Highway 7.

The project station designs are not finalized, as such it is unclear if they will be shelters like earlier iterations or large rapidways stations in the middle of the roadway.

Viva Silver
Station	Municipality	Notes
Vaughan Metropolitan Centre Terminal	Vaughan	Connects to Vaughan Metropolitan Centre station,
Pennsylvania	Vaughan	
Langstaff	Vaughan	
Vaughan Mills	Vaughan	Connects with the Vaughan Mills Terminal
Springside	Vaughan	
Norwood	Vaughan	
Major Mackenzie West Terminal	Vaughan	Built between Canada's Wonderland and Cortellucci Vaughan Hospital
McNaughton	Vaughan	
Keele	Vaughan	
Maple GO Station	Vaughan	Connects to
Peter Rupert	Vaughan	
Dufferin	Vaughan	
Bathurst	Vaughan/Richmond Hill	
Harding	Richmond Hill	Connects to
Yonge	Richmond Hill	Connects to
Richmond Hill GO Station	Richmond Hill	Connects to

== Bibliography ==
- "Moving to 2020: YRT/Viva 2016-2020 Strategic Plan" (PDF). York Region Transit. Archived from the original (PDF) on 2016-03-11.
- "Spadina Subway Transit Strategy" (PDF). 2015 Annual Service Plan. York Region Transit. 2015. p. 145. Archived from the original (PDF) on 21 May 2015.
