= YRT Special Constable Services =

Agency overview
- Formed: 2005

Jurisdictional structure
- Legal jurisdiction: York Region Transit (YRT) and Viva transit system in York Region, Ontario, Canada

Operational structure
- Headquarters: 50 High Tech Road, Richmond Hill, Ontario
- Sworn members: 25 (2020)
- Unsworn members: 11

Website
- Official website

The YRT Special Constable Services is the security section of the York Region Transit (YRT) and Viva transit system in York Region, Ontario, Canada. The Special Constable Services were launched in September 2005, and are responsible for safety and security on the YRT and Viva. These Special Constables are peace officers, have similar powers as police officers, and are sworn in by the YRT and the York Regional Police. Authorized as "Special Constables" by the York Police Services Board, pursuant to Section 53 of the Ontario Police Services Act. The Special Constable appointment, by its very nature affords "peace officer" powers under section 2 of the Canadian Criminal Code, as it relates to the duties of the YRT/Viva Transit System.

== Jurisdiction ==
A contingent of Special Constables patrol YRT and Viva properties and enforce:

- Criminal Code
- Controlled Drugs and Substances Act
- Regional Municipality of York Transit Bylaw (No. 2017-7),
- Mental Health Act

They also enforce the Trespass to Property Act of Ontario, as agents of the property.

Special constables wear distinct uniforms with black jackets and blue shirts with Special Constables identification (blue and black crest on their shoulders), handcuffs, ASP baton and pepper-foam.

Fare Media Inspectors are enforcement officers responsible for fare inspections on Viva and issuing fines relating to fare evasion.

YRT/Viva Special Constables also drive in unmarked and marked cruisers.

The special constables patrol within areas served by the YRT/Viva (mostly in York Region, but Toronto as well) in marked vehicles.

Constables are armed with handcuffs, OC foam and expandable baton only.

== See also ==
- York Region Transit
- Viva (bus rapid transit)
- Transit police
- Peace officer
- York Regional Police
