= York Regional Police =

Police agency of York Region, Ontario, Canada

York Regional Police Police régionale de York
- Motto: Deeds Speak

Agency overview
- Formed: 1971

Jurisdictional structure
- Constituting instrument: Community Safety and Policing Act, 2019 (SO 2019, c. 1, Sched. 1)

Operational structure
- Headquarters: 47 Don Hillock Drive, Aurora, Ontario 43°52′09″N 79°26′32″W
- Sworn members: 1,664 (2023)
- Unsworn members: 671 (2023)
- Elected officer responsible: Michael Kerzner, Solicitor General of Ontario
- Agency executive: Paulo Da Silva, Chief of Police

Facilities
- Districts: 5

Website
- www.yrp.ca

The York Regional Police (YRP; French: Police régionale de York) is the police service of the Regional Municipality of York, Ontario, Canada. YRP was formed in 1971 from the police forces maintained by the nine municipalities which amalgamated into York Region at the time. The force employs over 1,500 sworn members and 618 unsworn members as of 2015.

While YRP provides marine policing in the waters on Lake Simcoe, policing for Georgina Island (as well as Fox and Snake islands) is provided by the Georgina Island Police with assistance from the Ontario Provincial Police. The islands have had a separate First Nations police service since 1978.

== History ==
The York Regional Police were formed in 1971, when the province forced the creation of a regional upper-tier municipal government that included the lower-tier municipalities of York County.

Prior to 1971, there were several police forces serving individual communities:

- County of York Constabulary
- King Township Police
- Vaughan Township Police
- Whitchurch Township Police
- Markham Township Police
- North Gwillimbury Township Police
- Georgina Township Police
- East Gwillimbury Township Police
- Town of Richmond Hill Police
- Town of Newmarket Police
- Town of Aurora Police
- Village of Stouffville Police
- Village of Sutton Police
- Village of Woodbridge Police

The YRP's motto, "Deeds Speak", is derived from the motto of the 3rd York Militia Regiment, many of whom also served as local constables in the Home District. The YRP crest is based on the crest from the former County of York government.

== Command ==
The YRP's senior command consists of a chief of police and four deputy chiefs.

The head of the police service is Chief Jim MacSween who was sworn in as chief on May 1, 2020. He replaced retired Chief Eric Jolliffe, after he served almost 10 years in the position. The administration and senior command are based at York Regional Police Headquarters in Aurora, Ontario.

=== List of chiefs of the York Regional Police ===
A list of chiefs of the York Regional Police since its creation in 1971:

- Bruce Allan Crawford 1971–1987, former Metropolitan Toronto Police officer, former chief of the Toronto Harbour Commission Police
- Donald Hillock 1987–1992, former Aurora Township Police officer
- Bryan Cousineau 1992–1997, retired former Whitchurch Township Police officer; charged with breach of trust during his time as chief
- Peter Scott 1997–1998, acting chief after the retirement of Bryan Cousineau and former Metro Toronto Police deputy chief
- Julian Fantino 1998–2000, former senior Metro Toronto Police officer, chief of the London Police, later as Toronto Police chief, provincial commissioner of emergency management (assistant deputy minister) and former commissioner of the OPP
- Robert Middaugh 2000-December 12, 2002, 34-year career police officer; former deputy chief in Halton, chief in Hamilton-Wentworth
- Armand P. La Barge December 12, 2002-December 2010, former York Regional Police deputy chief and career officer with the force
- Eric Jolliffe December 13, 2010 – May 1, 2020
- Jim MacSween May 1, 2020 – Present

== Operations ==
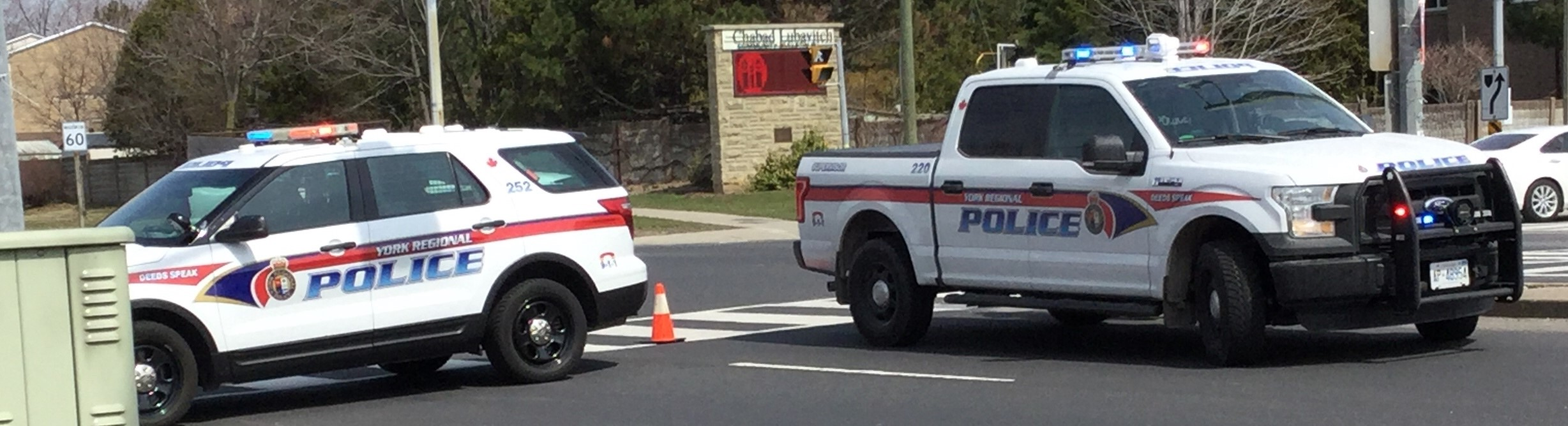
York Regional Police vehicles at an incident

Operations are composed of:

- Administrative services
- Information services
- Investigative services
- Support services
- Community services
- Court services
- Emergency support (ERU and EDU)

=== Operating districts ===
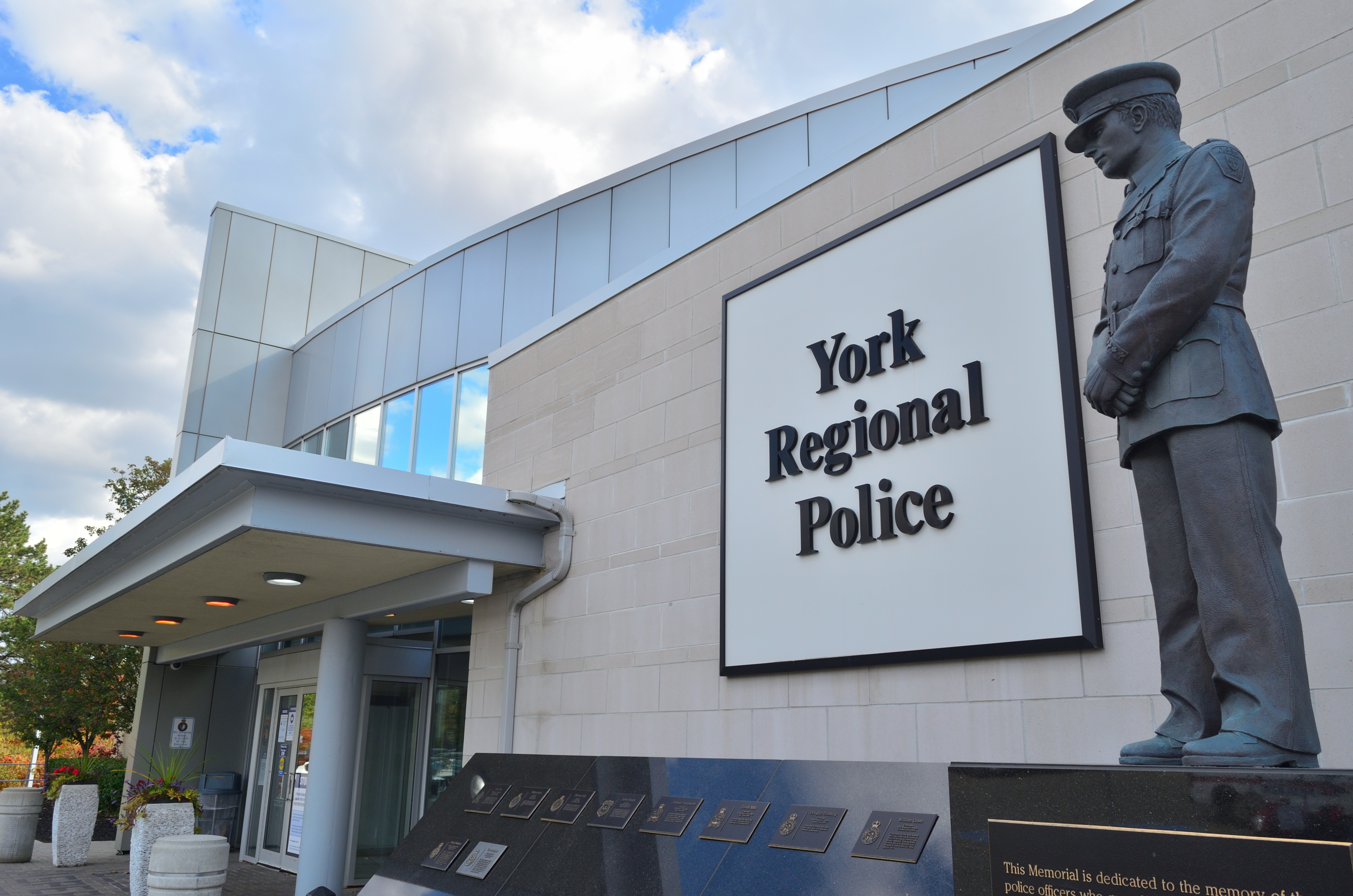
York Regional Police 2 District Headquarters

The York Regional Police are divided into five geographical districts:

- 1 District - 429 Harry Walker Parkway South, Newmarket serving:
  - Newmarket
  - Aurora
  - East Gwillimbury
  - King
- 2 District - 171 Major Mackenzie Drive West, Richmond Hill serving:
  - Richmond Hill (including Oak Ridges, a separate urban section of Richmond Hill)
  - Thornhill (sections of Markham and Vaughan flanking Yonge Street)
- 3 District - 3527 Baseline Road, Sutton serving:
  - Georgina
  - Lake Simcoe (patrolled by the Marine Unit)
- 4 District - 2700 Rutherford Road, Vaughan serving:
  - Vaughan (except Thornhill)
- 5 District - 8700 McCowan Road, Markham serving:
  - Markham (except Thornhill)
  - Whitchurch-Stouffville

Each district is headed by a superintendent and inspector.

=== Operational buildings ===
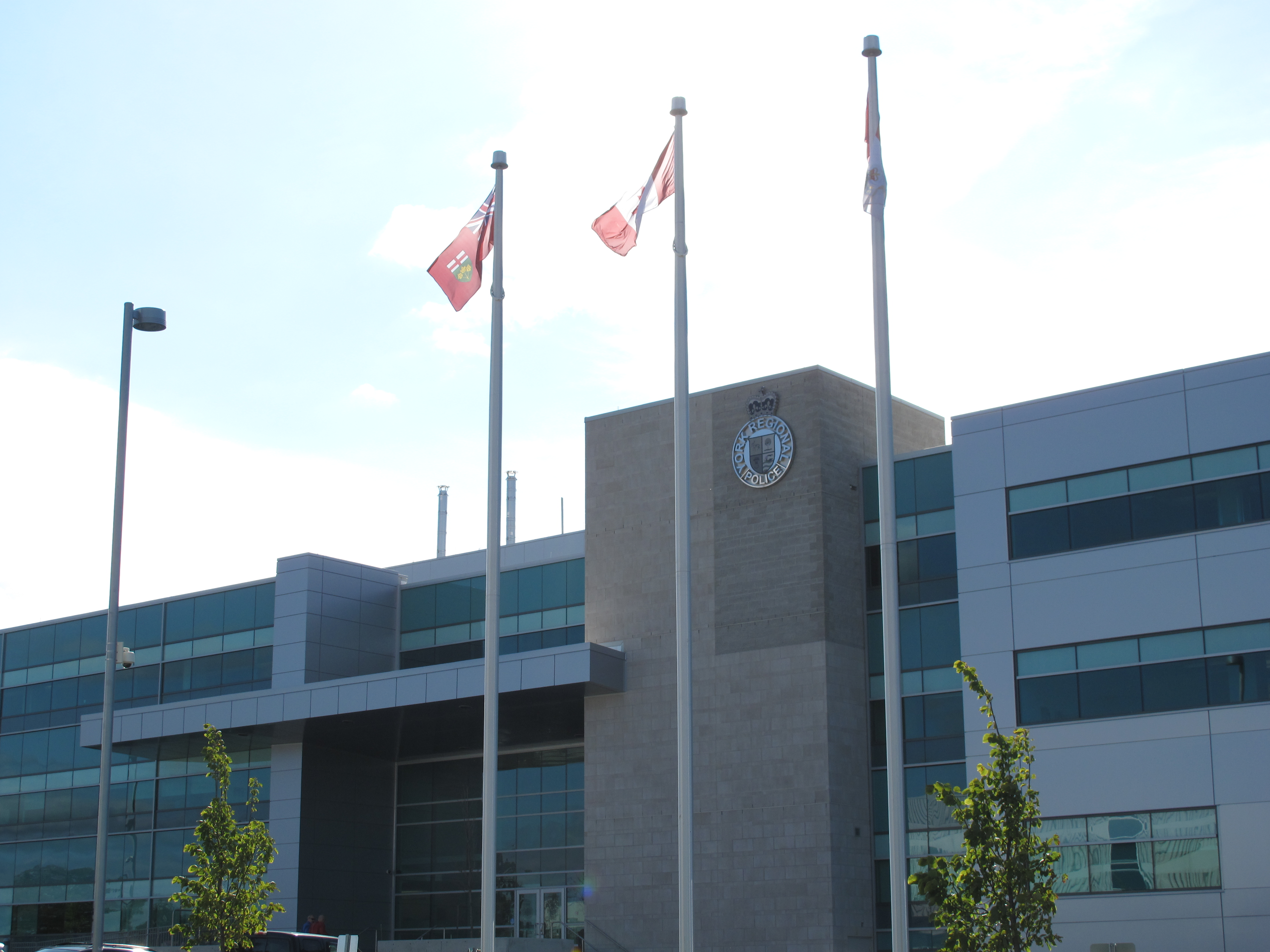
The exterior of the York Regional Police Headquarters

- Whitchurch-Stouffville Community Substation, 111 Sandiford Dr, Whitchurch-Stouffville

The York Regional Police provide a substation to the community of Whitchurch-Stouffville. Numerous personnel work out of this substation to provide a police presence for the community. This community substation is supplied under the host of 5 District (Markham) resources.

- King City Community Substation, 2585 King Rd, King

Shared with the King Township municipal offices, York Regional Police deploys personnel from the King City Community Substation to provide rapid and fluid policing services to the residents of King Township. The substation is supplied under the host of 1 District (Newmarket) resources.

- Community Safety Village of York Region, Bruce's Mill Conservation Area, 3291 Stouffville Rd, Whitchurch-Stouffville

York Regional Police's Community Safety Village is a resource used by the service to teach young children about fire, traffic and personal safety. The resource includes a 10,000 square foot replica town with crosswalks, functioning traffic lighting and signals. Usually the resource is utilized by local schools, however, several family events are held at the location yearly.

- Administrative Centre, 240 Prospect Street, Newmarket

The former headquarters for 1 District is currently under renovations to become an administration building. The building will host certain bureaus and their respective units that are currently operated out of Headquarters.

- Former site (now closed): Community Resource Centre (collision reporting and customer service), 10720 Yonge St, Richmond Hill

This site hosted the service's Collision Reporting Centre for collisions that occur of the southern municipalities in the region. It also offered services such as Police Information Checks, Criminal Record Checks and several other services. This centre was closed as of February 28, 2025 because YRP has set up online reporting for most minor road accidents.

=== Marine unit ===
The marine unit consists of 11 full-time members and patrols the southern shoreline of Lake Simcoe and other York Region waterways. It is responsible for approximately 350 square kilometers of Lake Simcoe and can service the entire lake if required. The unit has seven vessels at their disposal and are deployed from the Marine Unit Headquarters located at 57 Lorne St., in Jackson's Point, Georgina.

=== Emergency support ===
Emergency support is a 23-member unit with an emergency response unit and explosive disposal unit.

== Workforce ==
The service currently has an authorized strength of close to 1,700 sworn members and approximately 500 civilian staff.

== Fleet ==
The York Regional Police are one of two forces in the Greater Toronto area with an active air support unit (Durham is the other). While the Toronto Police Service does not have an air unit, York's air unit serves the area under a mutual support agreement.

The vehicles are numbered according to their District and car number. For example, 123 represents that the vehicle is from District 1, and the following 23 is the vehicle's designation number.

Other fleet numbering patterns include:

- ERU - Emergency Response Unit
- 9XX - Road Safety Bureau
- DUTX - Duty Inspector
- CSXX - Community Services
- CTSX - Court Services
- PSUXX - Public Safety Unit
- MCPX - Mobile Command Post
- ASUX - Air Support Unit
- FIA - Forensic Identification Assistant
- MARX - Marine Unit
- PDXX - Paid Duty Car
- K9XX - K9 Unit

Marked cruisers are labeled with the motto "Deeds Speak."

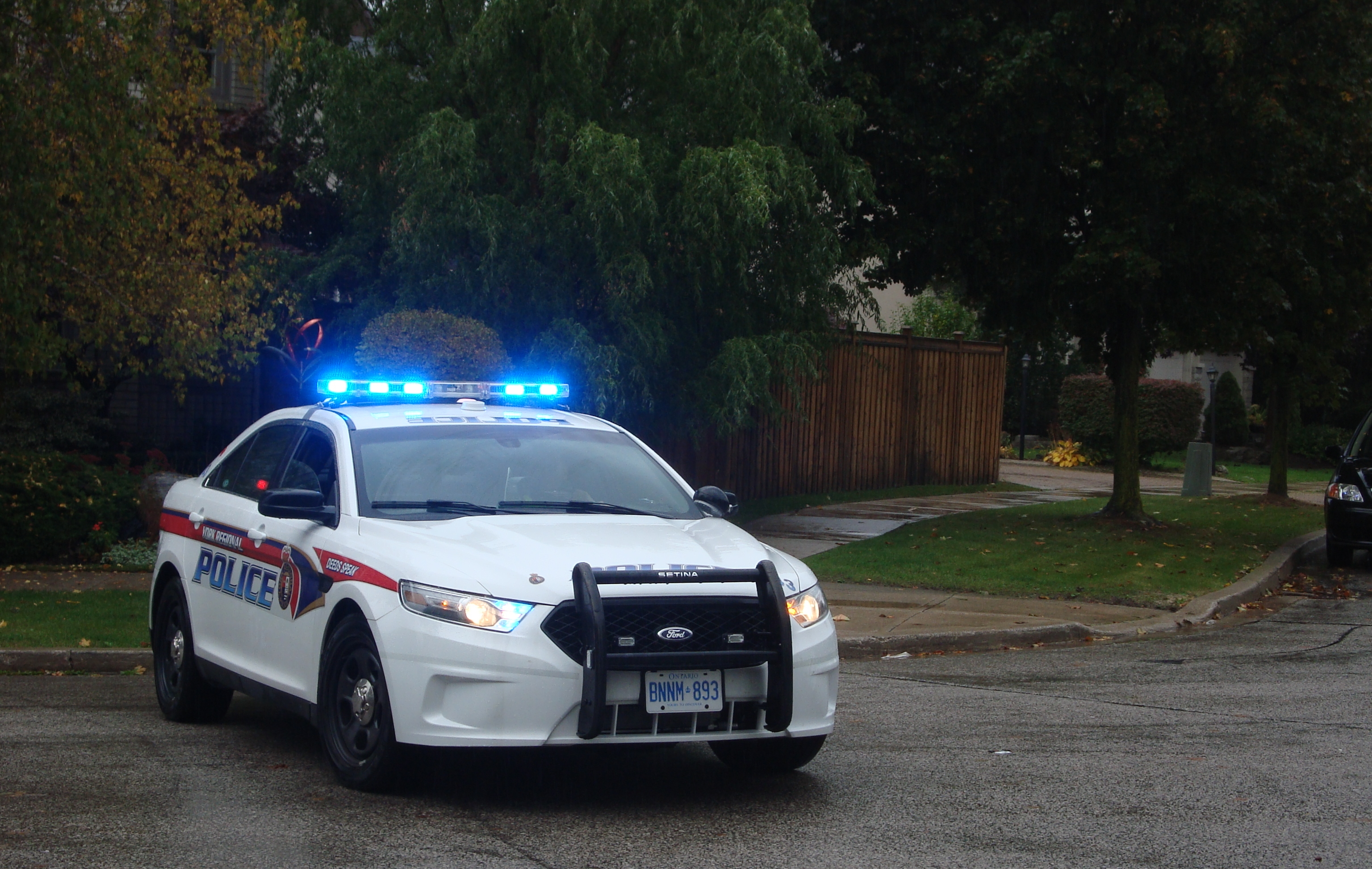
Ford Taurus

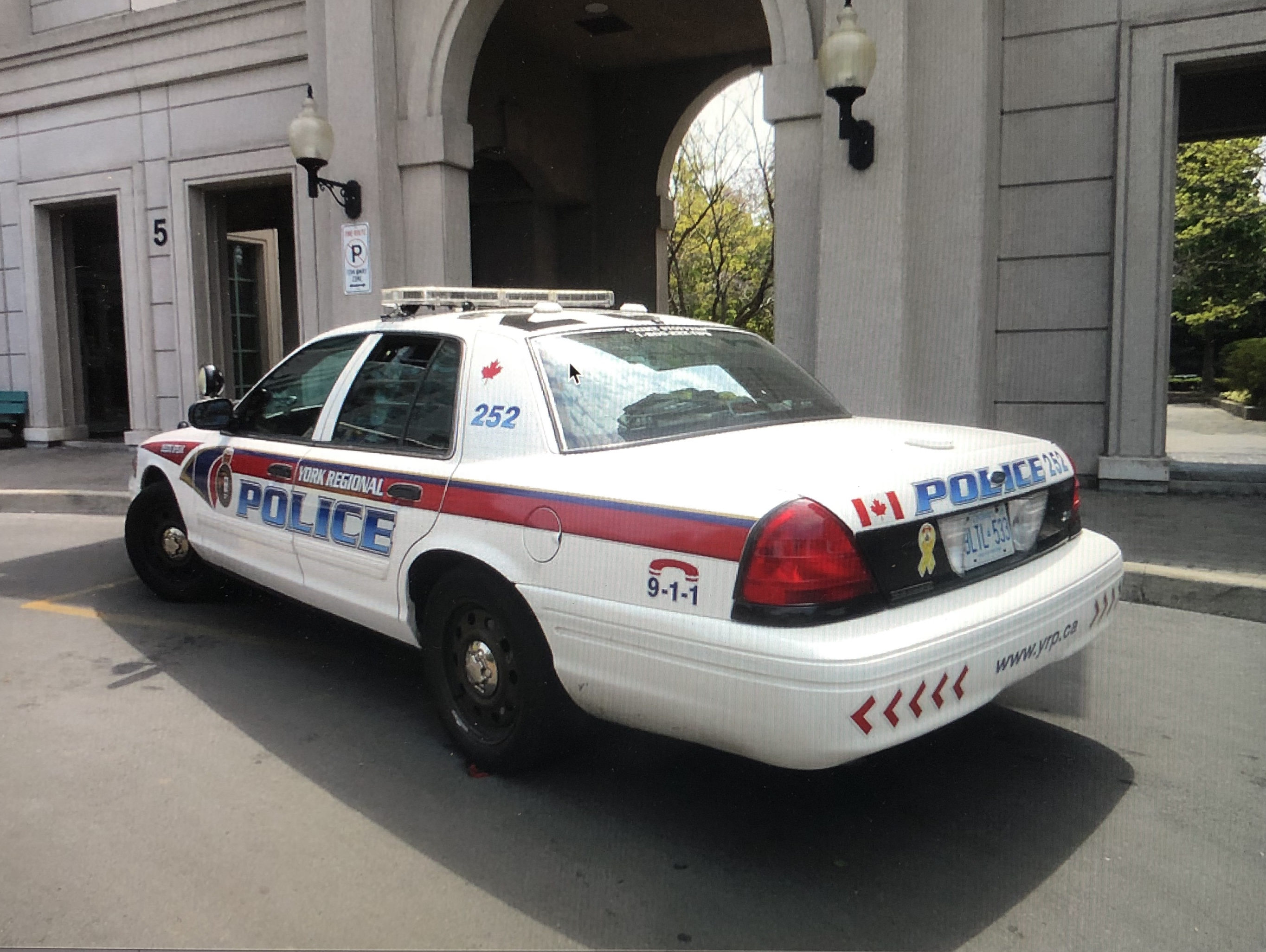
Ford Crown Victoria

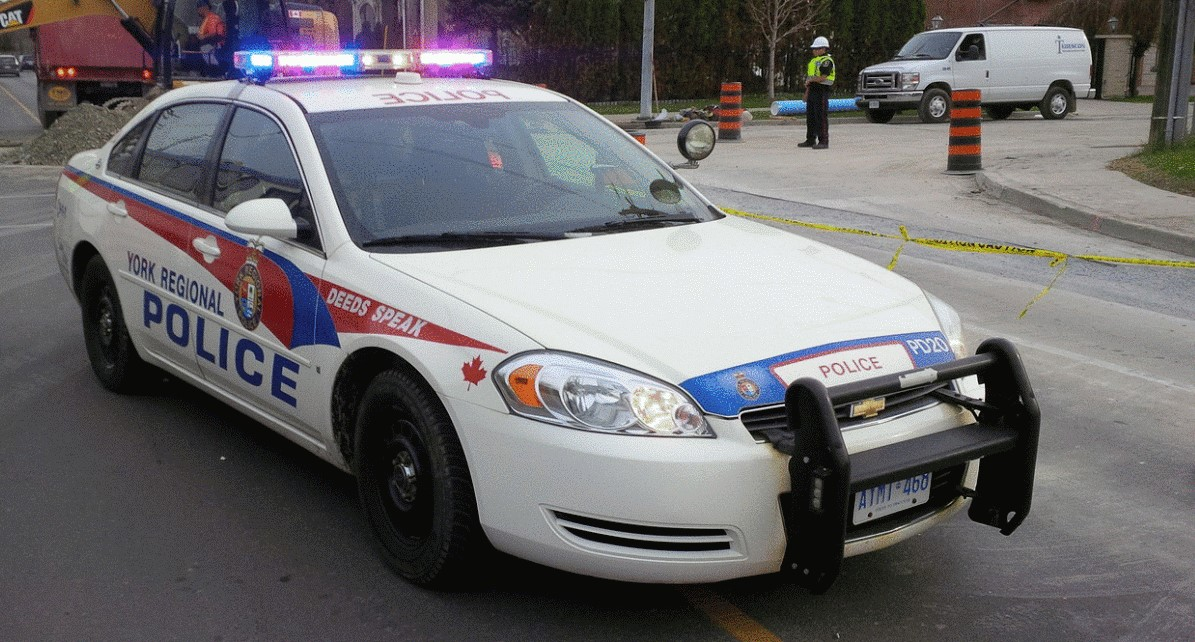
Chevrolet Impala

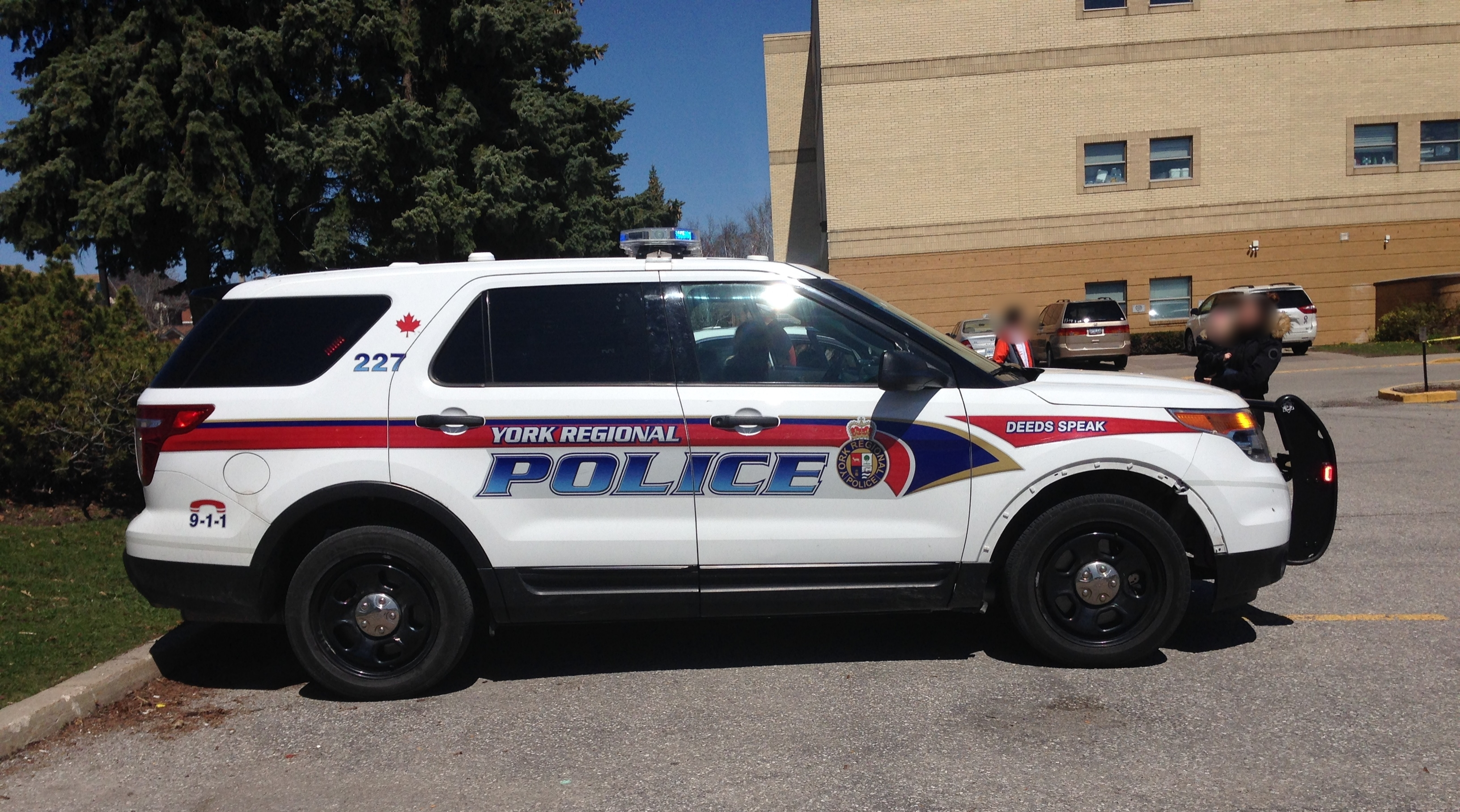
Ford Police Interceptor Utility

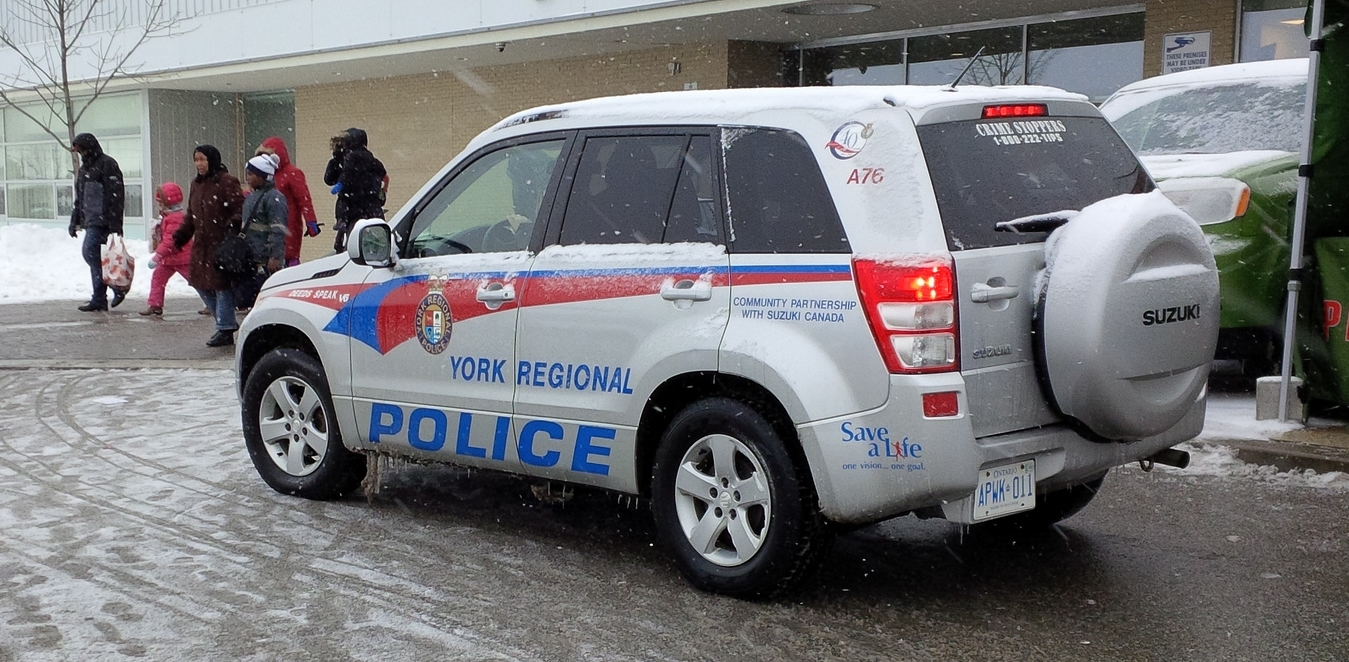
Suzuki Grand Vitara SUV

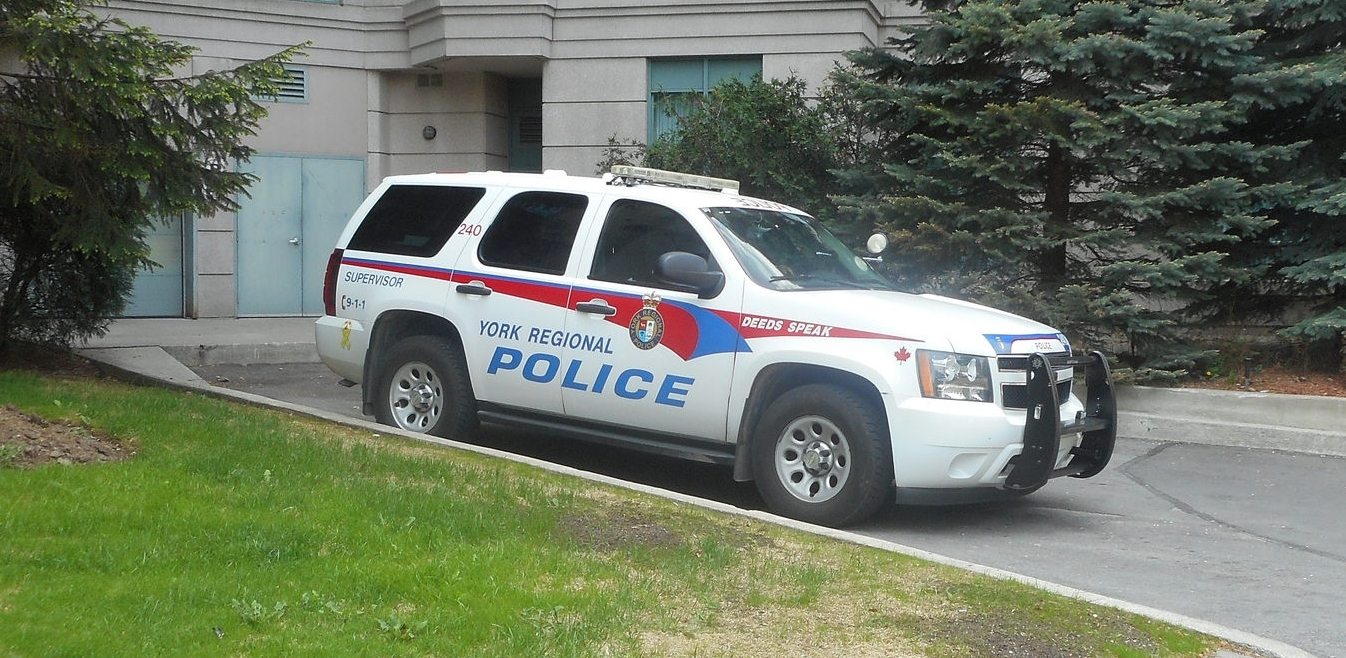
Chevrolet Tahoe

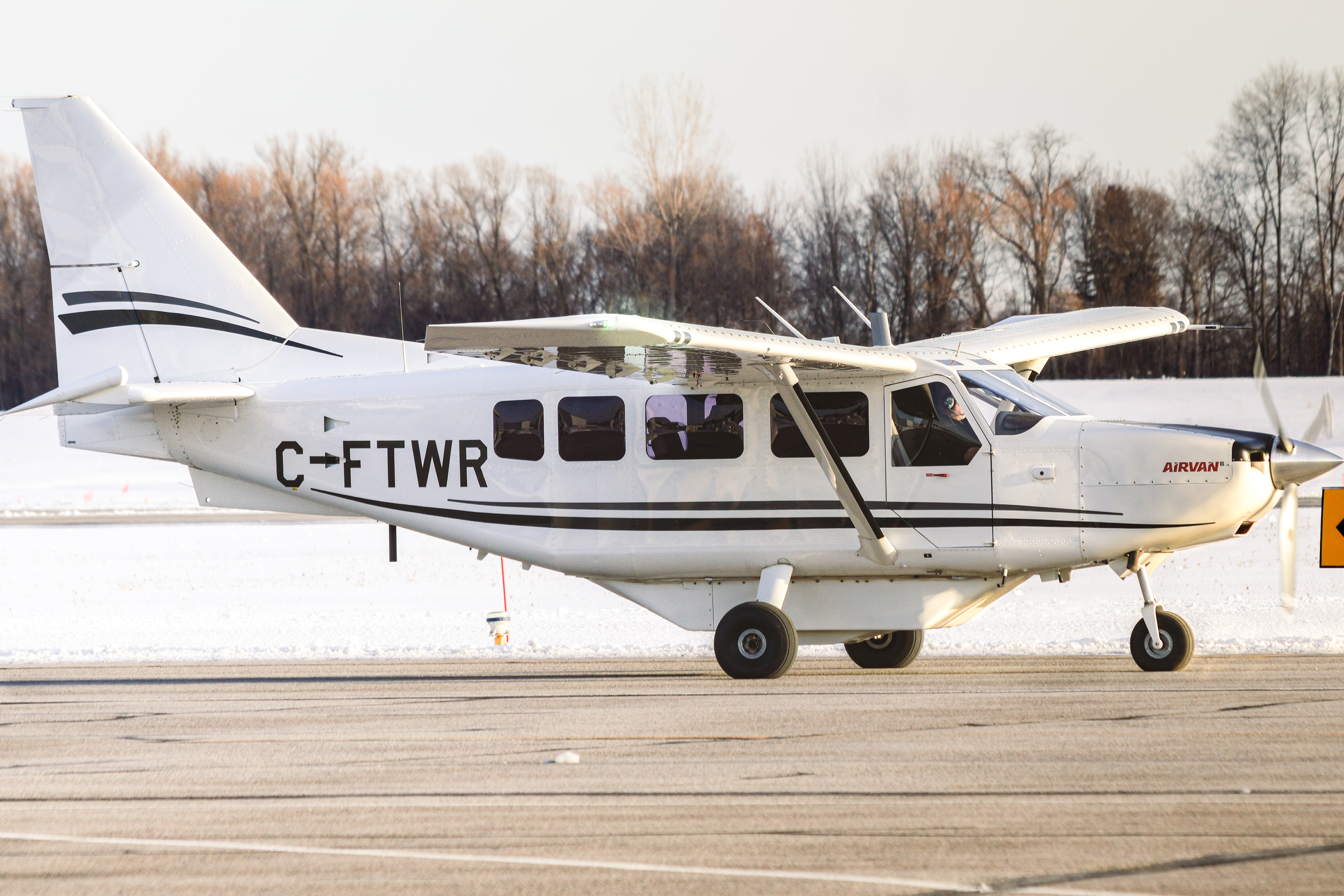
York Regional Police G-A8 Aircraft

Equipment list and details
Make/Model
Type
Status
Ford Police Interceptor Sedan
(marked/unmarked/stealth) - regular cruisers
active but being phased out
Ford Explorer
(marked/unmarked/stealth) - regular/k9 cruisers
active
Ford Crown Victoria
(marked/stealth) - regular cruisers
retired
Ford F-150
(marked/unmarked) - Supervisor/Duty Inspectors/Marine/ERU utilizes a modified unmarked variant of the F-150
active
Ford F-350
(marked/unmarked) - Assigned to Public Safety Unit
active
Dodge Charger (LX)
(marked) - regular cruisers
retired
Dodge Charger
(stealth/unmarked) - Assigned to Each District and Road Safety Bureau
active
Dodge Durango
(stealth) - Assigned to Each District and Road Safety Bureau
active
Chevrolet Impala
(marked/stealth) - paid duty cruisers
retired
Chevrolet Malibu
(marked) - regular cruisers
retired
Chevrolet Suburban
ERU - cruiser
active
Chevrolet Caprice
cruiser
1971–2013 - all retired
Harley-Davidson FLHTP
(marked) - motorcycles
active
Dodge Ram 1500
(marked) - regular cruisers assigned to the Road Safety Bureau
active
Terradyne MPV
Armoured Vehicle - ERU
active
GippsAero GA8 Airvan

under registration; C-FTWR

Aerial surveillance
active
Enstrom 480 (Callsign: AIR1) retired and traded-in for - Eurocopter EC120B (Callsign: AIR2)
utility helicopter
1995 helicopter (originally N911WF) donated to YRP in 2000 after sharing Bell Jet Ranger with DRPS for trial in 1999 and replaced in 2002 due to noise issues. Sold and registered as C-GZVB.
Eurocopter EC120B (Callsign: AIR2) retired and replaced by Airbus Helicopters H125 (Callsign: AIR2)
utility helicopter
Acquired in 2002 to replace Enstrom 480. Retired in 2023 when H125 was delivered.
Airbus Helicopters H125 (Callsign: AIR2) operated and maintained by Canadian Helicopters
utility helicopter
active; began service in March 2023
GMC C6500
RIDE command vehicle
N/A
GMC Vandura
forensics unit truck
retired
Chevrolet C4500
support vehicle
N/A
GMC Savanna
support vehicle
active
Chevrolet Tahoe
(marked) - supervisor SUV
retired
Ford Freestar
van
retired
Suzuki Grand Vitara
community service SUV
active
Farbor/Freightliner trucks
command unit
active
MU1 (MAR1) Waawaatesi (named for the Ojibway word for "firefly")
34' marine launch; stationed at the Keswick Community Policing Office
active
MU2 (MAR2) - Naawig (named for the Ojibway word for "out in deep water")
38' marine launch for open water operations with water nozzle on bow for marine fire fighting support to the Georgina Fire Department; stationed at the Keswick Community Policing Office
active
A15
6 metres (20 ft) RHIB zodiac with 115 hp engine for water rescue operations; stationed at the Keswick Community Policing Office
active
A16
3.2 metres (10 ft) inflatable zodiac for water rescue operations; stationed at the Keswick Community Policing Office
active
A17 - 'John'
canine boat; stationed at the Keswick Community Policing Office
active
Volkswagen Beetle
safety bug (community vehicle)
active
MU03 - Dawaabin
1000 Island Airboats Inc 24' / 584 hp airboat for ice rescue operations on Lake Simcoe; stationed at the Keswick Community Policing Office
active
Cambli International Thunder 1
Armoured Vehicle for ERU
delivered in 2011
Admiral Drive Systems Incorporated, London ON
7.49 metres (24.6 ft) aluminium vessel with 200 hp engine; stationed at the Keswick Community Policing Office
active
Yamaha
3.35 metres (11.0 ft) workboats; stationed at the Keswick Community Policing Office
active
Yamaha Grizzly 550
all-terrain vehicle for community-oriented response unit patrol
active
Bombardier Recreational Products CAN AM 500CC
all-terrain vehicle for community-oriented response unit patrol
2012; retired
Icor Technology Mk III Caliber Robot
remote control robot
2016

Three of the YRP's boats were named by Elder Barbara McDonald of the Chippewas of Georgina Island First Nation.

== Uniform ==
Front line officers are dressed in dark blue (shirts, cargo pants (with red stripe) and boots), standard in most municipal police services in Ontario. Winter jackets are either black or reflective orange/yellow with the word police in white and blue at the back. Previously the service wore light blue shirts.

The uniform patch consist of the force's crest with wording "York Regional Police" on a black tombstone shape.

Auxiliary members wear the same uniform; lack of weapons, different shoulder patch and different hat band (black and red Sillitoe tartan) distinguish them from front line officers.

Officers wear standard forage caps and may opt for Yukon hats in the winter. Motorcycle units have white helmets. Black or reflective gloves are also provided to officers directing traffic. Red caps are used by search teams looking for missing persons.

Senior officers have white shirts and a dark blue dress jacket.

=== Crest ===
- St. Edward's Crown
- Ribbon containing the words York Regional Police
- the escutcheon contains:
  - The "deer stricken by an arrow" represents the original state of the country
  - The "sheaf of wheat" represents the first progress in agriculture
  - The "tree with an axe" represents the first act of improvement
  - The "steam boat" represents the high state of technological advancement at the time

== Flag ==
The YRP's flag consists of a nautical B signal flag with the YRP crest located in the white portion.

== Ranks ==
The rank insignia of the York Regional Police is similar to that used by police services elsewhere in Canada and in the United Kingdom, except that the usual "pips" are replaced by maple leaves.

Rank	Commanding officers		Senior officers				Police officers			Officer in training
Rank	Chief of police	Deputy chief of police	Staff superintendent	Superintendent	Staff inspector	Inspector	Staff sergeant	Sergeant	Constable	Cadet
Insignia (Slip-on)										
Insignia (Shoulder board)							Shoulder boards not used for these ranks			

=== Police senior officers ===
The day-to-day and regional operations are commanded by senior officers:

- Superintendent
- Inspector

=== Uniformed non-commissioned officers ===
On-road enforcement and emergency response is supervised by:

- Staff sergeant (field command)
- Sergeant (district/area supervisors)

=== Investigative non-commissioned officers ===
Investigations are divided into crimes against persons and crimes against property. These investigations are conducted by:

- Detective sergeant (equivalent to staff sergeant)
- Detective (equivalent to sergeant)
- Detective constable

=== Police officers ===
- Constable - first class (4+ years), second class (3+ years), third class (2+ years), fourth class (1+ years), probationary (less than 1 year)

=== Civilian members ===
- Cadet
- Special constable (court security officers) - special constables are sworn-in pursuant to section 53 of the Police Services Act which confers peace officer status. Special constables have the powers of police officers to enforce federal statutes and various provincial statutes while in the execution of their duties.
- Station duty officers
- Police communicators
- Auxiliary constables (approximately 140 members since 2016) pursuant to section 52 of the Police Services Act, a chief of police can appoint auxiliary constables to act as volunteers. An auxiliary constable is not a peace officer but has the authority of a police officer only if he or she is accompanied or supervised by a police officer and is authorized to perform police duties by the chief of police.
- Fleet assistant - deal with maintenance of YRP vehicles

=== Communications ===
Communications is the branch of the York Regional Police responsible for receiving all 911 and non-emergency police calls. Under the supervision of information services, police communicators are on duty 24 hours a day, 365 days a year.

The communications staff are non-sworn members of the York Regional Police, though the bureau is under the direction of an inspector and a staff sergeant.

== Weapons ==
Product list and details
Make/Model	Type	Status
Glock 22 or 23	Service Pistol	Retired
Glock 45	Service Pistol	Active
Beretta Centurion 96D	Service Pistol	Retired
Remington 870P or Remington 870 Police Magnum	Pump-action shotgun	Active
Beretta 9mm	Service Pistol	sold to the Belleville Police Service
Colt Canada C8 rifle	Patrol Rifle	Active - used by ERU and Front Line Officers
Axon TASER X2 and T7	conducted energy weapon	Active
ARWEN 37	less-lethal baton launcher
(Unknown)	sniper rifle

== Emergency response Unit ==
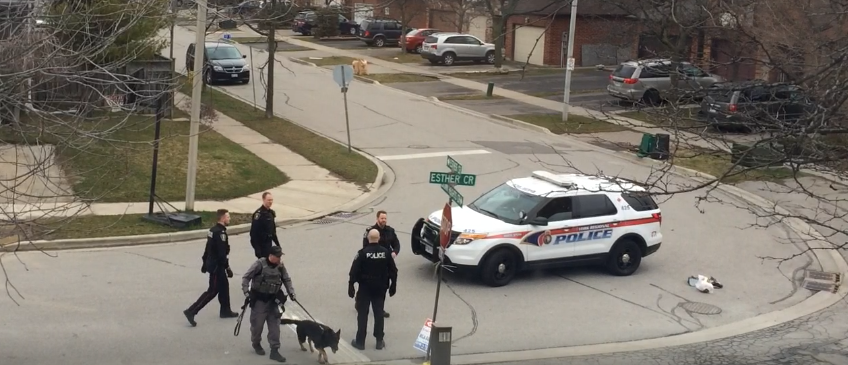
York Regional Police K9 unit searching for a missing person in Vaughan

The Emergency Response Unit (ERU) is the YRP SWAT team formed in 1980. The unit's primary mandate is to deal with high-risk situations beyond the safe operating limits of police officers with their normal equipment and training. The ERU provides assistance during any high risk situations by performing the following;

- Containment
- Apprehension of armed and/or barricaded persons
- Hostage rescue
- Explosive forced entry
- Explosive disposal
- High risk search warrants
- High risk vehicles/trains/aircraft assaults

In 1988 demand for the ERU was on the rise. Various operational obligations including the fatal shooting of an armed suspect by the ERU during a hostage rescue in Richmond Hill highlighted the need for additional members. In 1989 the ERU increased to 11 members.

In 2001 the York Regional Police established a shared service agreement with the Durham Regional Police Service, which allows for reciprocal tactical support in the event of large scale or long duration deployments. The York Regional Police provide tactical team and hostage rescue team support to the South Simcoe Police Service upon their request.

Following the September 11, 2001, terrorist attacks in New York City, increased awareness of terrorist threats provided the greatest single incentive for growth and investment of tactical teams in Ontario since the 1976 Olympics in Montreal, Quebec.

The ERU's roster was expanded in 2002 to an undisclosed number. The roster includes both snipers and explosives technicians.

The ERU has full explosive forced entry capabilities, which are mainly used in its hostage rescue and armed/barricaded operations. The ERU is regularly involved in high-risk search warrant services within the York Region and the Greater Toronto Area as well as a number of high-profile joint forces operations within Ontario.

The York Regional Police ERU conduct their own strenuous selection process, with the applicants mainly being from the departments' uniformed divisions. The unit also trains its own candidates in most required disciplines and is one of the founding members of the Ontario Tactical Advisory Body (OTAB).

Members of the ERU currently hold positions within the OTAB and Canadian Explosive Technicians Association (CETA) as well as membership in the National Tactical Officers Association (NTOA) and International Association of Bomb Technicians and Investigators (IABTI).

== Traffic bureau ==
The traffic bureau was formed in 1989. At that time, the traffic bureau worked out of offices located at 200 Industrial Parkway South in the Town of Aurora. The traffic bureau was made up of officers whose primary function was to enforce traffic related laws. The unit was made up of six officers who drove motorcycles and marked police cruisers.

As time went on the unit began to specialize in the reconstruction of motor vehicle collisions. The unit expanded to approximately 20 officers working on four different platoons. The platoons followed the regular uniform officer shifts.

=== Collision reconstruction unit ===
On January 1, 2002, the traffic bureau was split into two separate entities, a traffic enforcement unit and a technical collision investigation unit (TCIU). The TCIU was made up of six officers on two separate shifts supervised by one supervisor.

In 2004, the technical collision investigation unit was renamed the "collision reconstruction unit". The unit had eight members made up of investigators and collision reconstructionists. The unit was still working with two shifts and each shift had a supervisor.

At present the collision reconstruction unit is made up of 10 officers. Two teams of four investigators and collision reconstructionists and a supervisor. The team members specialize in investigative techniques and collision reconstruction.

On December 15, 2003, York Regional Police's collision reconstruction unit investigated a collision on Rutherford Road west of Pine Valley Drive in the City of Vaughan that killed former NHL Chicago Black Hawks player Keith Magnuson. Rob Ramage, another former NHL player, was arrested and charged with impaired operation causing death and bodily harm, dangerous operation causing death and bodily harm, as well as over 80mgs. At the trial in the fall of 2007, Ramage was convicted of all the counts except the over 80mgs. In January 2008, Ramage was sentenced to four years in prison. He appealed his conviction and sentence. On July 12, 2010, the Ontario Court of Appeal upheld the conviction and sentence.

The members of the unit have received training in collision reconstruction, marine reconstruction and other related fields in Ontario as well as in the US

=== Enforcement unit ===
The enforcement unit is responsible for enforcement of all traffic laws. Officers from the enforcement unit perform breath tests and test drivers for sobriety utilizing standardized field sobriety testing and drug recognition experts. The York Regional Police's traffic bureau has trained over 100 frontline officers in the SFST battery and 15 officers trained as DREs

Officers from the enforcement unit utilize various speed measuring devices from hand-held radars and lasers to moving radar units in their police vehicles. Speed enforcement is conducted throughout the region. Special computerized ticket writing units are utilized in police vehicles to ensure there are no human errors.

The enforcement unit also instituted a prohibited driver program where officers investigate persons convicted of criminal driving offences whereby their driving privileges are revoked. Members use unmarked vehicles and conduct surveillance on suspects' home and court to catch violators.

The enforcement unit is known to have ticket quotas and unnecessarily handing out tickets. During the COVID-19 pandemic, York Regional Police officers wrote out tickets for expired licence plate stickers, despite the fact that the provincial government had extended the validity of these stickers indefinitely.

== Emergency services ==
The York Regional Police are part of the York Region's emergency services and works with:

- York Region Paramedic Services
- Fire Services in York Region
- YRT/Viva Special Constable Services

== Community services ==
Bobby the Bear, Morris the Moose and Bucky the Beaver are the force's mascots and appear at various community events.

The York Regional Police also operates a variety of musical ensembles by permission of the chief. The York Regional Police Pipes and Drums, the Community Chorus, and Youth Band all represent the police force at parades, community functions and ceremonies.

=== York Regional Police Pipes and Drums ===
The York Regional Police Pipes and Drums is a pipe band affiliated with the police service. Founded in 1988, it consists of serving members of the police force and the public. The band represents the police force at a variety of events where appropriate, including parades and community functions. The band also competes in local pipe band competitions in grade 4.

=== Ceremonial and Mounted Units ===
YRP has a ceremonial unit that represents the force at formal events, public events in Canada and the United States. The Mounted Unit was formed in 2012 and consists of volunteers riding on 6 horses for events tied with the Ceremonial Unit.

== See also ==
- Regional Police
