= Hungarian Figure Skating Championships =

Recurring figure skating competition

- Status: Active
- Genre: National championships
- Frequency: Annual
- Country: Hungary
- Inaugurated: 1900
- Previous event: 2026 Four Nationals Championships
- Next event: 2027 Four Nationals Championships
- Organizer: Hungarian National Skating Federation

The Hungarian Figure Skating Championships (Hungarian: Magyarország évi műkorcsolyázó bajnoksága) are an annual figure skating competition organized by the Hungarian National Skating Federation (Hungarian: Magyar Országos Korcsolyázó Szövetség) to crown the national champions of Hungary. The first official Hungarian Championships were held in 1900 in Budapest and consisted of events in speed skating and figure skating. Men and women competed in the same event until 1924, when a separate women's event was held. Pair skating was added in 1928 and ice dance in 1949. There were periodic interruptions early on, especially during World War I, but the championships have been held without interruption since 1946. Since 2014, the senior-level championships, as well as the junior-level pairs and ice dance championships, have been held in conjunction with the skating federations of the Czech Republic, Poland, and Slovakia as part of the Four Nationals Figure Skating Championships. Junior-level singles skaters compete in a separate competition that is exclusive to Hungary.

Medals are awarded in men's singles, women's singles, pair skating, and ice dance at the senior and junior levels, although each discipline may not necessarily be held every year due to a lack of participants. László Vajda currently holds the record for winning the most Hungarian Championship titles in men's singles (with ten), while Júlia Sebestyén holds the record in women's singles (with nine), and Krisztina Regőczy and András Sallay hold the record in ice dance (with nine). László Kondi holds the record in pair skating (with ten), but these were not all won with the same partner.

== History ==
The first official Hungarian Championships were held in 1900 in Budapest and consisted of events in speed skating and figure skating. National skating competitions in Hungary have almost exclusively been held in Budapest. Men and women competed in the same championship event until 1924, when a separate event for women was added. Pair skating was added in 1928, and ice dance in 1949. There were periodic interruptions early on, especially during World War I, but the championships have been held without interruption since 1946.

Hungary currently holds its senior-level championships, as well as its junior-level pairs and ice dance championships, as part of the Four Nationals Figure Skating Championships. After the dissolution of Czechoslovakia in 1992, the Czech Skating Association and the Slovak Figure Skating Association ran independent national championships until the 2006–07 season, when the two associations joined their championships together as one event. The Czech Republic and Slovakia alternated as hosts for the combined championships until the 2008–09 season, when Poland joined and the Three Nationals Figure Skating Championships were formed. Since the addition of Hungary during the 2013–14 season, the event has been known as the Four Nationals Figure Skating Championships. The four nations rotate as hosts, while skaters from the four countries compete together and the results are then split at the end of the competition to form national podiums. In 2021, Hungary held their own national championships when the COVID-19 pandemic made travel to the 2021 Four Nationals Championships in Poland unfeasible.

== Senior medalists ==
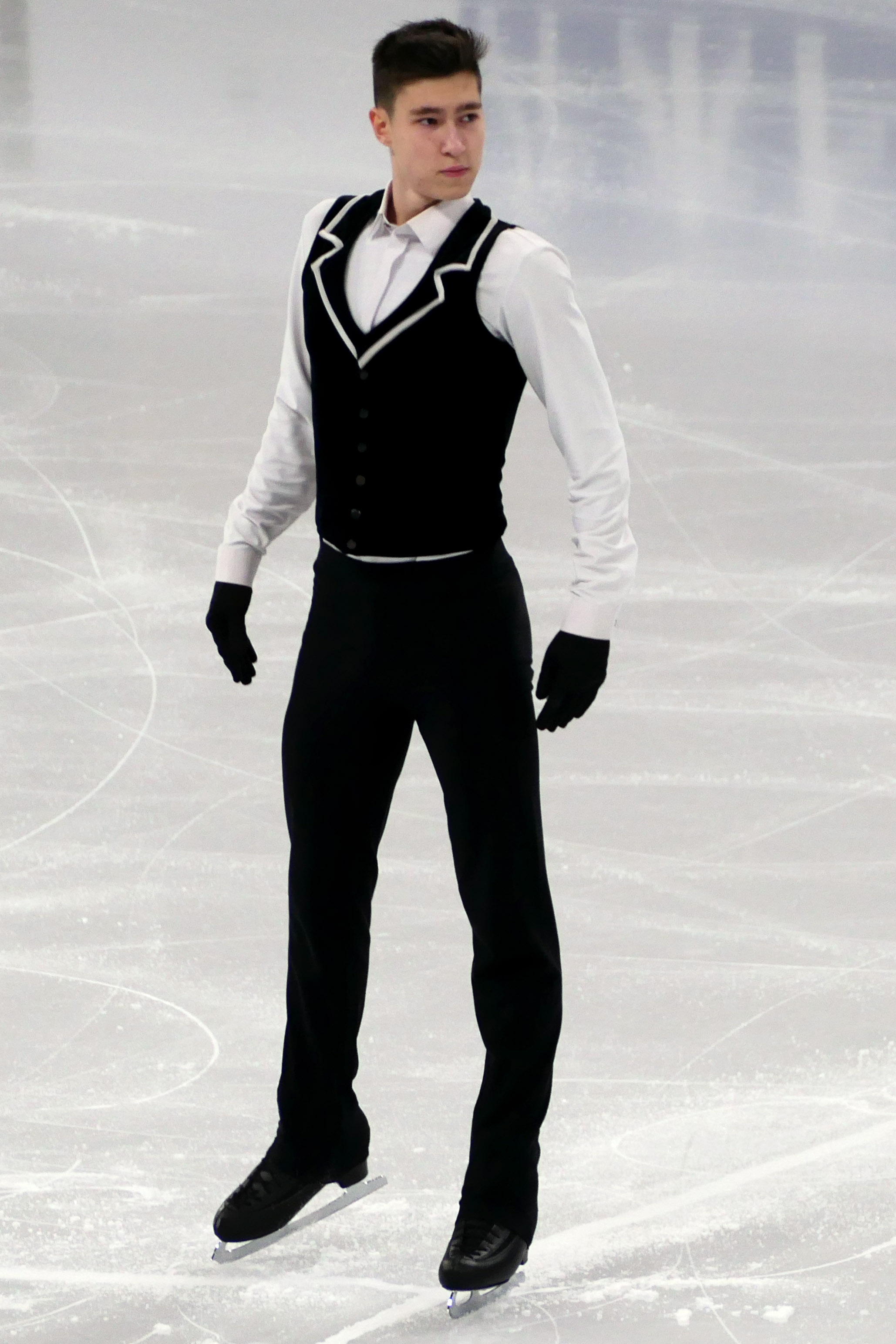
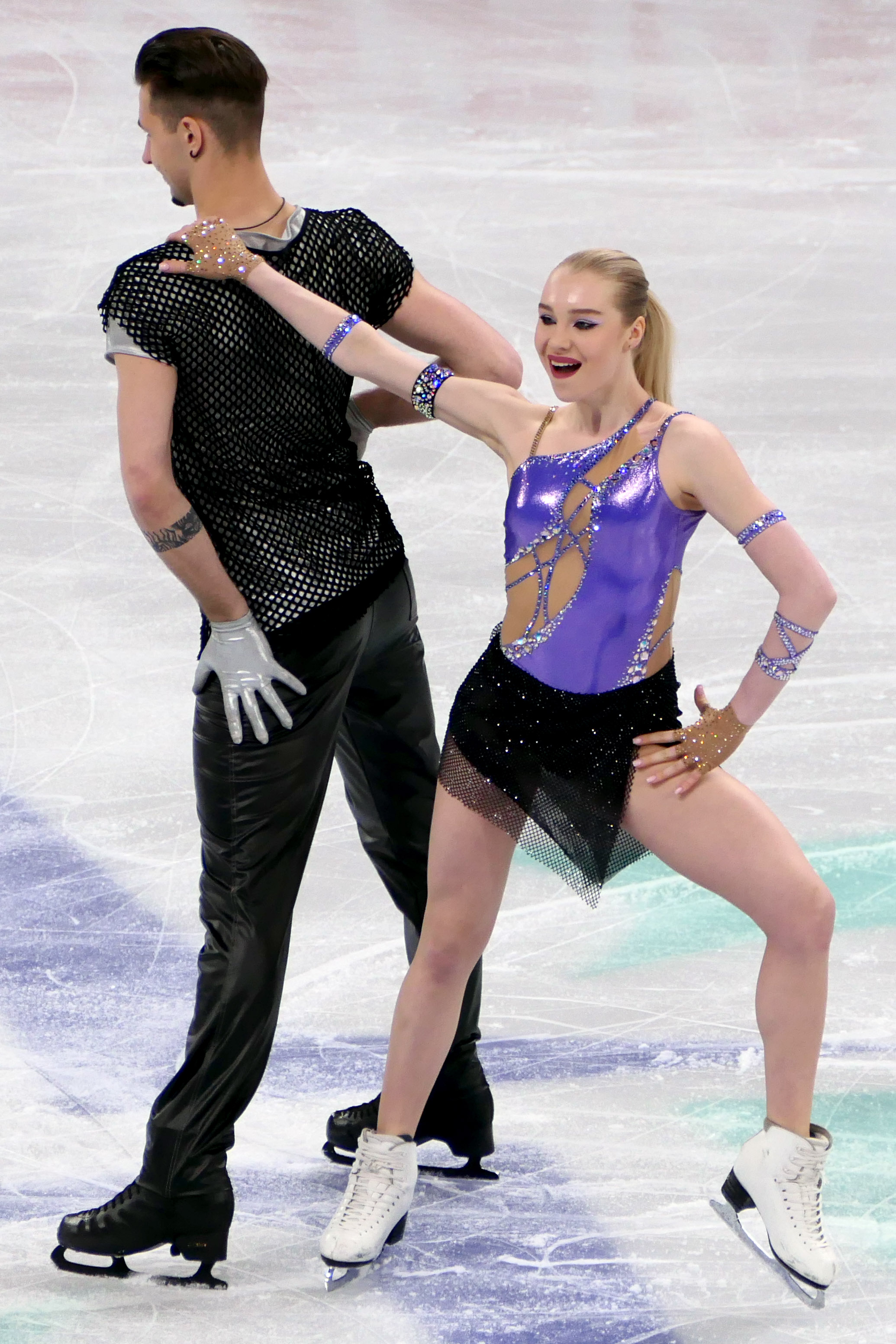
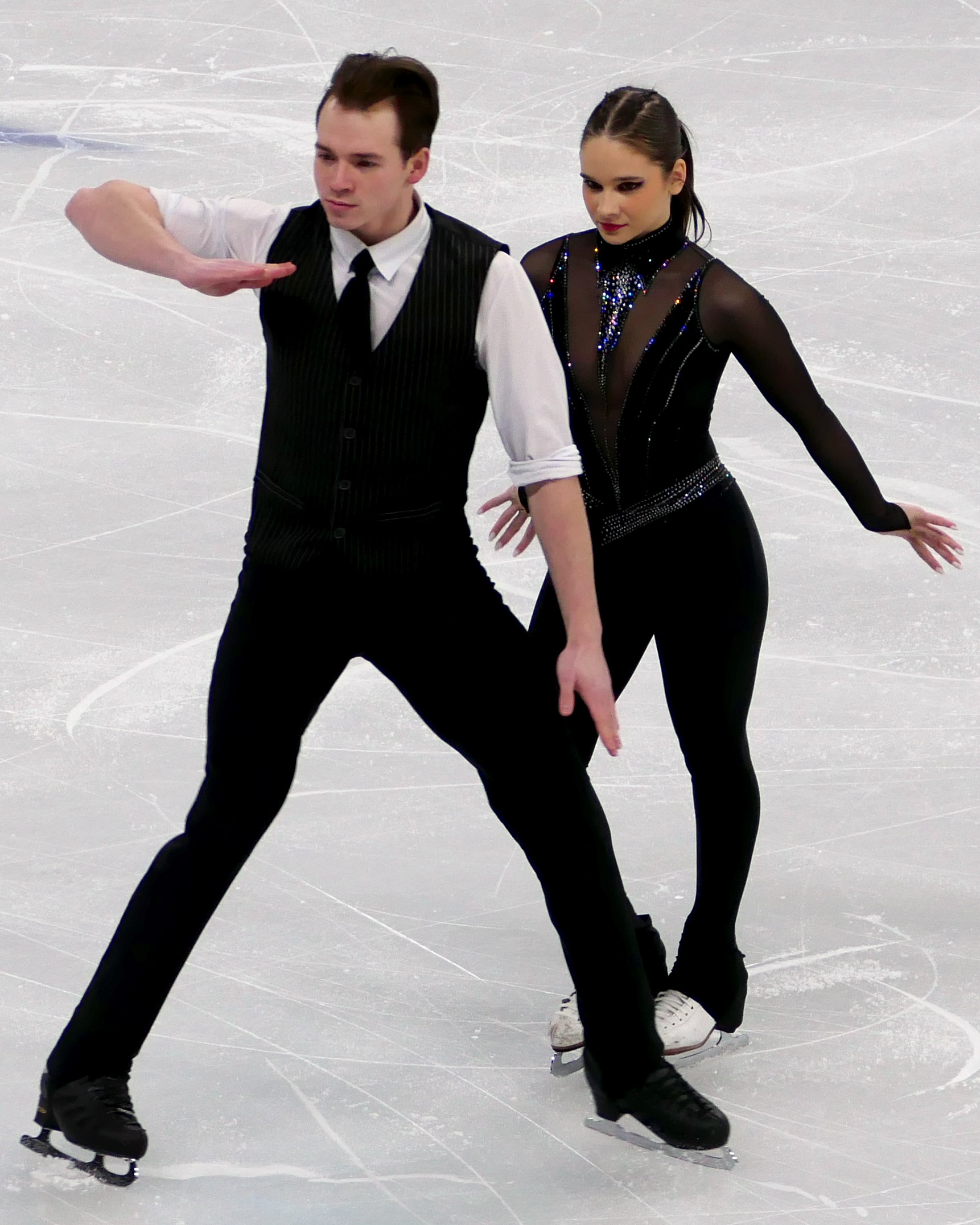
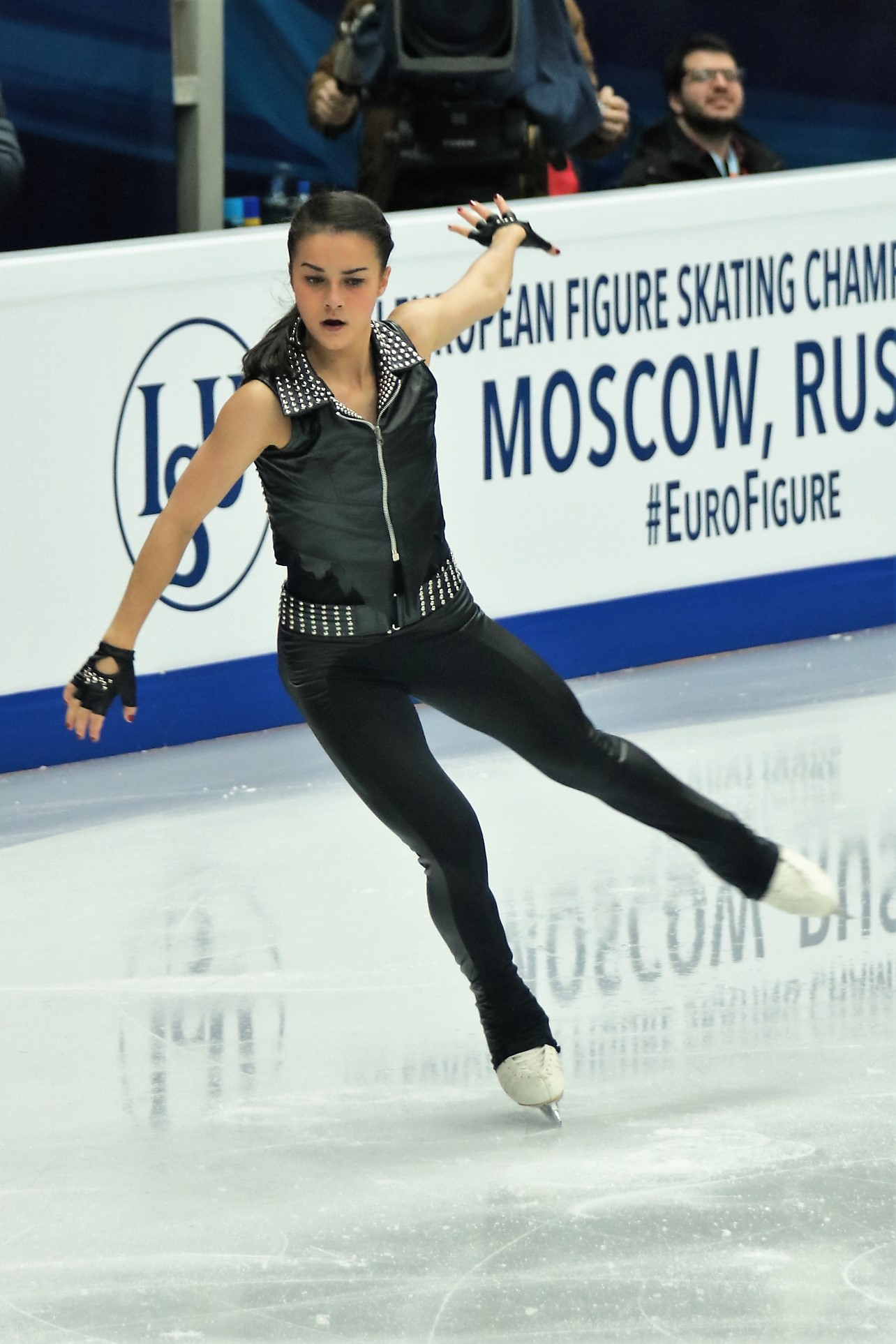
From left to right: Aleksandr Vlasenko, three-time Hungarian champion in men's singles; Mariia Ignateva and Danijil Szemko, four-time Hungarian champions in ice dance; Maria Pavlova and Alexei Sviatchenko, two-time Hungarian champions in pair skating; and Ivett Tóth, six-time Hungarian champion in women's singles

=== Singles ===
Prior to the establishment of a separate event for women in 1924, men and women competed in the same event.

Singles event medalists
Year	Location	Gold	Silver	Bronze	Ref.
1900	Budapest	Árpád Wein	No other competitors		
1901	Budapest	Tivadar Meszléri	No other competitors		
1902	Budapest	No competition held			
1903	Budapest	Jenő Márkus	Tibor Földváry	Arthur Deseő	
1904	Budapest	Sándor Urbány Jr.	Lily Kronberger	No other competitors	
1905	Budapest	Anton Steiner	Sándor Urbány Jr.	Márton Gordan	
1906	Budapest	Sándor Urbány Jr.	No other competitors		
1907	Budapest	Sándor Urbány Jr.	No other competitors		
1908	Budapest	Lily Kronberger	No other competitors		
1909	Budapest	Lily Kronberger	Andor Szende	No other competitors	
1910	Budapest	Lily Kronberger	Andor Szende	No other competitors	
1911	Budapest	Andor Szende	No other competitors		
1912	Budapest	Andor Szende	Otió Mövius	No other competitors	
1913–21	Budapest	No competitions due to World War I			
1922	Budapest	Andor Szende	József Lápocsy	Livió Tóth	
1923	Budapest	No competition held			

=== Men's singles ===
Senior men's event medalists
Year	Location	Gold	Silver	Bronze	Ref.
1924	Budapest	Pál Jaross	József Lápocsy	No other competitors	
1925	Budapest	Pál Jaross	József Lápocsy	Antal Finster	
1926	Budapest	Pál Jaross	József Lápocsy	Antal Finster	
1927	Budapest	József Lápocsy	Antal Finster	No other competitors	
1928	Budapest	József Lápocsy	Marcell Wittmann	Elemér Kocsuba	
1929	Budapest	József Lápocsy	Márton Vadas	István Szendrő	
1930	Budapest	Márton Vadas	József Lápocsy	Ferenc Kertész	
1931	Budapest	Márton Vadas	Ferenc Kertész	Dénes Pataky	
1932	Budapest	Márton Vadas	Ferenc Kertész	Dénes Pataky	
1933	Budapest	Dénes Pataky	Ferenc Kertész	Elemér Terták	
1934	Budapest	Dénes Pataky	Ferenc Kertész	Elemér Terták	
1935	Budapest	Dénes Pataky	Elemér Terták	Ferenc Kertész	
1936	Budapest	Dénes Pataky	Elemér Terták	Ferenc Kertész	
1937	Budapest	Elemér Terták	István Hostyánszky	Ferenc Kertész	
1938	Budapest	Elemér Terták	Ferenc Kertész	Dénes Pataky	
1939	Budapest	Elemér Terták	Kristóf Kállay	Zoltán Király	
1940	Budapest	Kristóf Kállay	Ede Király	No other competitors	
1941	Budapest	Kristóf Kállay	Ede Király	Béla Bareza-Rotter	
1942	Budapest	Kristóf Kállay	Ede Király	No other competitors	
1943	Budapest	Kristóf Kállay	Ede Király	Gyula Csepella	
1944	Budapest	Ede Király	Kristóf Kállay	Gyula Csepella	
1945	Budapest	No competition held			
1946	Budapest	Ede Király	Ferenc Kálmán	Gyula Csepella	
1947	Budapest	Ede Király	Ferenc Kálmán	Gyula Csepella	
1948	Budapest	Ede Király	Ferenc Kálmán	Gyula Csepella	
1949	Budapest	Ede Király	István Hostyánszky	Gábor Vida	
1950	Budapest	Ede Király	István Hostyánszky	György Czakó	
1951	Budapest	György Czakó	Gábor Vida	Miklós Kucharovitz	
1952	Budapest	György Czakó	Miklós Kucharovitz	István Szenes	
1953	Budapest	István Szenes	Miklós Kucharovitz	No other competitors	
1954	Budapest	György Czakó	István Szenes	Henryk Szymocha	
1955	Budapest	István Szenes	György Czakó	No other competitors	
1956	Budapest	István Szenes	György Czakó	No other competitors	
1957	Budapest	Miklós Kucharowitz	Gábor Vida	No other competitors	
1958	Budapest	Miklós Rácz	No other competitors		
1959	Budapest	Miklós Rácz	Jenő Ébert	No other competitors	
1960	Budapest	Károly Ujlaky	Jenő Ébert	No other competitors	
1961	Budapest	Jenő Ébert	Károly Ujlaky	No other competitors	
1962	Budapest	Károly Ujlaky	No other competitors		
1963	Budapest	Jenő Ébert	László Viglás	No other competitors	
1964	Budapest	Jenő Ébert	Zoltán Horváth	László Viglás	
1965	Budapest	Jenő Ébert	Zoltán Horváth	No other competitors	
1966	Budapest	Jenő Ébert	Zoltán Horváth	Gábor Kiliti	
1967	Budapest	Jenő Ébert	Zoltán Horváth	Gábor Kiliti	
1968	Budapest	Jenő Ébert	Zoltán Horváth	Gábor Kiliti	
1969	Budapest	Zoltán Horváth	László Vajda	Gábor Kiliti	
1970	Budapest	László Vajda	István Simon	No other competitors	
1971	Budapest	László Vajda	István Simon	János Böröcz	
1972	Budapest	László Vajda	István Simon	János Böröcz	
1973	Budapest	László Vajda	János Böröcz	Sándor Joó	
1974	Budapest	László Vajda	Sándor Nagy	István Simon	
1975	Budapest	László Vajda	István Simon	János Böröcz	
1976	Budapest	László Vajda	Sándor Nagy	Attila Ömböly	
1977	Budapest	László Vajda	István Simon	Sándor Nagy	
1978	Budapest	László Vajda	István Simon	Sándor Nagy	
1979	Budapest	László Vajda	István Simon	Attila Ömböly	
1980	Budapest	István Simon	Attila Ömböly	Imre Raábe	
1981	Budapest	István Simon	Imre Raábe	Attila Ömböly	
1982	Budapest	András Száraz	Sándor Nagy	Attila Ömböly	
1983	Budapest	András Száraz	Imre Raábe	No other competitors	
1984	Budapest	András Száraz	Imre Raábe	Gábor Gágyar	
1985	Budapest	Imre Raábe	András Száraz	Akos Bánhidi	
1986	Budapest	András Száraz	Imre Raábe	Gábor Gágyar	
1987	Budapest	András Száraz	Imre Raábe	Péter Kovács	
1988	Budapest	András Száraz	Imre Raábe	Péter Kovács	
1989	Budapest	András Száraz	Péter Kovács	János Skáre	
1990	Budapest	András Száraz	Péter Kovács	No other competitors	
1991	Budapest	Péter Kovács	Zoltán Kőszegi	Balázs Grenczer	
1992	Budapest	Balázs Grenczer	Péter Kovács	Zoltán Kőszegi	
1993	Budapest	Szabolcs Vidrai	Zoltán Tóth	Zoltán Kőszegi	
1994	Budapest	Zsolt Kerekes	Szabolcs Vidrai	Zoltán Tóth	
1995	Budapest	Zsolt Kerekes	Szabolcs Vidrai	Zoltán Kőszegi	
1996	Budapest	Szabolcs Vidrai	Zoltán Tóth	Zoltán Kőszegi	
1997	Budapest	Szabolcs Vidrai	Zoltán Kőszegi	Márton Domokos	
1998	Budapest	Szabolcs Vidrai	Zoltán Kőszegi	No other competitors	
1999	Budapest	Szabolcs Vidrai	Zoltán Kőszegi	Zoltán Tóth	
2000	Dunaújváros	Szabolcs Vidrai	Bertalan Zákány	Zoltán Tóth	
2001	Dunaújváros	Zoltán Tóth	Szabolcs Vidrai	Bertalan Zákány	
2002	Budapest	Bertalan Zákány	Zoltán Tóth	No other competitors	
2003	Budapest	Zoltán Tóth	Bertalan Zákány	No other competitors	
2004	Budapest	Zoltán Tóth	Bertalan Zákány	No other competitors	
2005	Budapest	Zoltán Tóth	György Beck	No other competitors	
2006	Budapest	Zoltán Tóth	Bertalan Zákány	Tigran Vardanjan	
2007	Budapest	Tigran Vardanjan	Márton Markó	No other competitors	
2008	Budapest	Tigran Vardanjan	Mark Magyar	No other competitors	
2009	Budapest	Tigran Vardanjan	Márton Markó	No other competitors	
2010	Budapest	Márton Markó	Tigran Vardanjan	No other competitors	
2011	Budapest	Tigran Vardanjan	Kristóf Forgó	Márton Markó	
2012	Budapest	Márton Markó	Kristóf Forgó	No other competitors	
2013	Budapest	Márton Markó	Kristóf Forgó	No other competitors	
2014	(Slovakia) Bratislava	Márton Markó	Kristóf Forgó	No other competitors	
2015	Budapest	Kristóf Forgó	No other competitors		
2016	(Czech Republic) Třinec	Alexander Maszljanko	Alexander Borovoj	Máté Böröcz	
2017	(Poland) Katowice	Alexander Borovoj	András Csernoch	No other competitors	
2018	(Slovakia) Košice	Alexander Maszljanko	Alexander Borovoj	Máté Böröcz	
2019	Budapest	Alexander Borovoj	Alexander Maszljanko	András Csernoch	
2020	(Czech Republic) Ostrava	András Csernoch	Máté Böröcz	No other competitors	
2021	Budapest	András Csernoch	Máté Böröcz	Alexander Maszljanko	
2022	(Slovakia) Spišská Nová Ves	András Csernoch	Aleksandr Vlasenko	Mózes József Berei	
2023	Budapest	Aleksandr Vlasenko	Mózes József Berei	Aleksei Vlasenko	
2024	(Czech Republic) Turnov	Aleksandr Vlasenko	Aleksei Vlasenko	No other competitors	
2025	(Poland) Cieszyn	Aleksandr Vlasenko	Aleksei Vlasenko	No other competitors	
2026	(Slovakia) Prešov	Aleksei Vlasenko	No other competitors		

=== Women's singles ===
Senior women's event medalists
Year	Location	Gold	Silver	Bronze	Ref.
1924	Budapest	Gitta Tóth	Istvánné Nemes	No other competitors	
1925	Budapest	Gitta Tóth	Lotti Stieber	Ms. Ozarovszkyné	
1926	Budapest	Lotti Stieber	Silvia Tóth	Ms. Ozarovszkyné	
1927	Budapest	Lotti Stieber	Silvia Tóth	No other competitors	
1928	Budapest	Edit Hecht	Lotti Stieber	Piroska Levitzky	
1929	Budapest	Piroska Levitzky	Silvia Tóth	Erzsébet Révay	
1930	Budapest	Piroska Levitzky	Lotti Stieber	Magda Imrédy	
1931	Budapest	Piroska Levitzky	Magda Imrédy	Vilma Nyilas	
1932	Budapest	Magda Imrédy	Vilma Nyilas	Nadinka Szilassy	
1933	Budapest	Magda Imrédy	Nadinka Szilassy	Piroska Levitzky	
1934	Budapest	Magda Imrédy	Piroska Levitzky	Magda Imrédy & Vilma Nyilas (tie)	
1935	Budapest	Nadinka Szilassy	Éva Botond	Klári Erdös	
1936	Budapest	Éva Botond	Nadinka Szilassy	Györgyi Botond	
1937	Budapest	Nadinka Szilassy	Klári Erdös	Éva Botond	
1938	Budapest	Nadinka Szilassy	Klári Erdös	Éva Botond	
1939	Budapest	Éva Botond	Györgyi Botond	Ágnes Szécsi	
1940	Budapest	Éva Botond	Györgyi Botond	Éva Saáry	
1941	Budapest	Györgyi Botond	Éva Saáry	Mária Saáry	
1942	Budapest	Györgyi Botond	Éva Saáry	Andrea Kékesy	
1943	Budapest	Györgyi Botond	Éva Saáry	Mária Saáry	
1944	Budapest	Györgyi Botond	Éva Saáry	Mária Saáry	
1945	Budapest	No competition held			
1946	Budapest	Éva Saáry	Mária Saáry	Andrea Kékesy	
1947	Budapest	Mária Saáry	Éva Saáry	Andrea Kékesy	
1948	Budapest	Mária Saáry	Györgyi Botond	Andrea Kékesy	
1949	Budapest	Mária Saáry	Éva Saáry	Jolán Kékessy	
1950	Budapest	Klára Erdős	Eszter Jurek	Jolán Kékessy	
1951	Budapest	Éva Saáry	Eszter Jurek	Márta Peterdy	
1952	Budapest	Éva Saáry	Eszter Jurek	Hédi Pálinkás	
1953	Budapest	Hédi Pálinkás	Márta Peterdy	Marietta Kovács	
1954	Budapest	Eszter Jurek	Hédi Pálinkás	Marietta Kovács	
1955	Budapest	Eszter Jurek	Hédi Pálinkás	Helga Zöllner	
1956	Budapest	Eszter Jurek	Helga Zöllner	Edda Jurek	
1957	Budapest	Helga Zöllner	Eszter Jurek	Edda Jurek	
1958	Budapest	Helga Zöllner	Eszter Jurek	Edda Jurek	
1959	Budapest	Helga Zöllner	Edda Jurek	Éva Csoma	
1960	Budapest	Helga Zöllner	Edda Jurek	Éva Csoma	
1961	Budapest	Helga Zöllner	Éva Csoma	Edda Jurek	
1962	Budapest	Helga Zöllner	Éva Csoma	Zsuzsa Szentmiklóssy	
1963	Budapest	Zsuzsa Szentmiklóssy	Zsuzsa Almássy	Edit Simsik	
1964	Budapest	Zsuzsa Almássy	Zsuzsa Szentmiklóssy	Edit Simsik	
1965	Budapest	Zsuzsa Szentmiklóssy	Zsuzsa Almássy	Mária Szöllösi	
1966	Budapest	Zsuzsa Almássy	Zsuzsa Szentmiklóssy	Zsófia Wagner	
1967	Budapest	Zsuzsa Almássy	Zsuzsa Szentmiklóssy	Zsófia Wagner	
1968	Budapest	Zsuzsa Almássy	Zsófia Wagner	Zsuzsa Homolya	
1969	Budapest	Zsuzsa Almássy	Zsófia Wagner	Zsuzsa Homolya	
1970	Budapest	Zsuzsa Almássy	Zsófia Wagner	Zsuzsa Homolya	
1971	Budapest	Vera Varga	Ms. Halász	Zsuzsa Homolya	
1972	Budapest	Zsuzsa Almássy	Vera Varga	Zsuzsa Homolya	
1973	Budapest	Vera Varga	Zsuzsa Homolya	Krisztina Homolya	
1974	Budapest	Ágnes Erős	Vera Varga	Ildikó Segesdy	
1975	Budapest	Ágnes Erős	Vera Varga	Ildikó Segesdy	
1976	Budapest	Ildikó Segesdy	Mónika Sultész	Ildikó Berendi	
1977	Budapest	Ágnes Erős	Ildikó Segesdy	Mónika Sultész	
1978	Budapest	Ágnes Erős	Ildikó Segesdy	Ildikó Berendi	
1979	Budapest	Ágnes Erős	Ildikó Segesdy	Ildikó Berendi	
1980	Budapest	Ildikó Segesdy	Éva Farkas	Ms. Sluth	
1981	Budapest	Éva Demeny	No other competitors		
1982	Budapest	Nóra Miklósy	Judit Szalay	Ms. Sárközi	
1983	Budapest	Nóra Miklósy	Tamara Téglássy	Judit Szalay	
1984	Budapest	Tamara Téglássy	Judit Szalay	Ms. Sárközi	
1985	Budapest	Tamara Téglássy	Judit Szalay	Rita Baráth	
1986	Budapest	Tamara Téglássy	Rita Baráth	Bea Folláth	
1987	Budapest	Tamara Téglássy	Rita Baráth	Éva Plaszkó	
1988	Budapest	Tamara Téglássy	Éva Plaszkó	Ms. Gránicz	
1989	Budapest	Tamara Téglássy	Éva Farkas	Katalint Rózsa	
1990	Budapest	Tamara Téglássy	Ms. Sarkadi	Anita Markóczy	
1991	Budapest	Tamara Téglássy	Zsófia Kulcsár	Anita Markóczy	
1992	Budapest	Krisztina Czakó	Zsófia Kulcsár	Emília Nagy	
1993	Budapest	Krisztina Czakó	Éva Gegő	Zsófia Kulcsár	
1994	Budapest	Krisztina Czakó	Emília Nagy	Szilviát Szabó	
1995	Budapest	Krisztina Czakó	Júlia Sebestyén	Diána Póth	
1996	Budapest	Krisztina Czakó	Diána Póth	Barbara Maros	
1997	Budapest	Krisztina Czakó	Diána Póth	Júlia Sebestyén	
1998	Budapest	Krisztina Czakó	Diána Póth	Júlia Sebestyén	
1999	Budapest	Diána Póth	Júlia Sebestyén	Katalin Szakál	
2000	Dunaújváros	Diána Póth	Júlia Sebestyén	Tamara Dorofejev	
2001	Dunaújváros	Tamara Dorofejev	Júlia Sebestyén	Diána Póth	
2002	Budapest	Júlia Sebestyén	Tamara Dorofejev	Viktória Pavuk	
2003	Budapest	Júlia Sebestyén	Diána Póth	Tamara Dorofejev	
2004	Budapest	Júlia Sebestyén	Viktória Pavuk	Tamara Dorofejev	
2005	Budapest	Júlia Sebestyén	Diána Póth	Bianka Pádár	
2006	Budapest	Júlia Sebestyén	Diána Póth	Katherine Hadford	
2007	Budapest	Júlia Sebestyén	Viktória Pavuk	Katherine Hadford	
2008	Budapest	Júlia Sebestyén	Katherine Hadford	Viktória Pavuk	
2009	Budapest	Júlia Sebestyén	Bianka Pádár	Katherine Hadford	
2010	Budapest	Júlia Sebestyén	Katherine Hadford	Chelsea-Rose Chiappa	
2011	Budapest	Viktória Pavuk	Chelsea-Rose Chiappa	Bianka Pádár	
2012	Budapest	Chelsea-Rose Chiappa	Regina Borbély	Annamária Szolga	
2013	Budapest	Eszter Szombathelyi	Regina Borbély	Bernadett Szakács	
2014	(Slovakia) Bratislava	Ivett Tóth	Bernadett Szakács	Eszter Szombathelyi	
2015	Budapest	Ivett Tóth	Eszter Szombathelyi	No other competitors	
2016	(Czech Republic) Třinec	Ivett Tóth	Fruzsina Medgyesi	Júlia Bátori	
2017	(Poland) Katowice	Ivett Tóth	Júlia Bátori	Eszter Szombathelyi	
2018	(Slovakia) Košice	Fruzsina Medgyesi	Ivett Tóth	Dária Jakab	
2019	Budapest	Ivett Tóth	Fruzsina Medgyesi	Kloé Rozgonyi	
2020	(Czech Republic) Ostrava	Ivett Tóth	Regina Schermann	Bernadett Szigeti	
2021	Budapest	Júlia Láng	Regina Schermann	Bernadett Szigeti	
2022	(Slovakia) Spišská Nová Ves	Júlia Láng	Regina Schermann	Bernadett Szigeti	
2023	Budapest	Júlia Láng	Katinka Anna Zsembery	Lili Krizsanovski	
2024	(Czech Republic) Turnov	Regina Schermann	Dária Zsirnov	Katinka Anna Zsembery	
2025	(Poland) Cieszyn	Vivien Papp	Regina Schermann	No other competitors	
2026	(Slovakia) Prešov	Léna Ekker	Katinka Anna Zsembery	Vivien Papp	

=== Pairs ===
Senior pairs event medalists
Year	Location	Gold	Silver	Bronze	Ref.
1928	Budapest	Olga Orgonista; Sándor Szalay	Istvánné Nemes; Mr. Nemes	Emília Rotter; László Szollás	
1929	Budapest	Olga Orgonista; Sándor Szalay	Emília Rotter; László Szollás	Ily Phillipovits; Rudolf Dillinger	
1930	Budapest	Olga Orgonista; Sándor Szalay	Ily Phillipovits; Rudolf Dillinger	Emília Rotter; László Szollás	
1931	Budapest	Emília Rotter; László Szollás	Lucy Galló; Rudolf Dillinger	Éva Tusák; Zoltán Balázs	
1932	Budapest	Emília Rotter; László Szollás	Lucy Galló; Rudolf Dillinger	Éva Tusák; Zoltán Balázs	
1933	Budapest	Emília Rotter; László Szollás	Lucy Galló; Rudolf Dillinger	Éva Tusák; Zoltán Balázs	
1934	Budapest	Emília Rotter; László Szollás	Lucy Galló; Rudolf Dillinger	Éva Tusák; Zoltán Balázs	
1935	Budapest	Emília Rotter; László Szollás	Lucy Galló; Rudolf Dillinger	Éva Tusák; Zoltán Balázs	
1936	Budapest	Emília Rotter; László Szollás	Piroska Szekrényessy; Attila Szekrényessy	Éva Tusák; Zoltán Balázs	
1937	Budapest	Piroska Szekrényessy; Attila Szekrényessy	Éva Tusák; Zoltán Balázs	Magda Imrédy; Ferenc Kertész	
1938	Budapest	Piroska Szekrényessy; Attila Szekrényessy	Erika Bass; Béla Barcza-Rotter	Magda Szakács; Ernő Ormos	
1939	Budapest	Piroska Szekrényessy; Attila Szekrényessy	Erika Bass; Béla Barcza-Rotter	Nadinka Szilassy; Ferenc Kertész	
1940	Budapest	Nadinka Szilassy; Ferenc Kertész	Piroska Szekrényessy; Attila Szekrényessy	No other competitors	
1941	Budapest	Piroska Szekrényessy; Attila Szekrényessy	Nadinka Szilassy; Ferenc Kertész	No other competitors	
1942	Budapest	Piroska Szekrényessy; Attila Szekrényessy	Nadinka Szilassy; Ferenc Kertész	Zsuzsa Matusik; Rudolf Molnár	
1943	Budapest	Piroska Szekrényessy; Attila Szekrényessy	Nadinka Szilassy; Ferenc Kertész	Zsuzsa Matusik; Rudolf Molnár	
1944	Budapest	Andrea Kékesy; Ede Király	Zsuzsa Matusik; Rudolf Molnár	No other competitors	
1945	Budapest	No competition held			
1946	Budapest	Györgyi Botond; Ferenc Kertész	Andrea Kékesy; Ede Király	Marianna Nagy; László Nagy	
1947	Budapest	Andrea Kékesy; Ede Király	Marianna Nagy; László Nagy	No other competitors	
1948	Budapest	Andrea Kékesy; Ede Király	Györgyi Botond; Ferenc Kertész	Marianna Nagy; László Nagy	
1949	Budapest	Andrea Kékesy; Ede Király	Marianna Nagy; László Nagy	No other competitors	
1950	Budapest	Marianna Nagy; László Nagy	Éva Szöllősy; Gábor Vida	No other competitors	
1951	Budapest	Marianna Nagy; László Nagy	Éva Szöllősy; Gábor Vida	No other competitors	
1952	Budapest	Marianna Nagy; László Nagy	Éva Szöllősy; Gábor Vida	No other competitors	
1953	Budapest	Éva Szöllősy; Gábor Vida	No other competitors		
1954	Budapest	Marianna Nagy; László Nagy	Éva Szöllősy; Gábor Vida	Eszter Jurek; Georges Czakó	
1955	Budapest	Marianna Nagy; László Nagy	Éva Szöllősy; Gábor Vida	No other competitors	
1956	Budapest	Marianna Nagy; László Nagy	Eszter Jurek; Miklós Kucharowitz	Erika Tóth; Georges Czako	
1957	Budapest	Marianna Nagy; László Nagy	Eszter Jurek; Miklós Kucharowitz	No other competitors	
1958	Budapest	No pairs competitors			
1959	Budapest	Mária Terlanday; László Kondi	Mária Csordás; Miklós Rácz	No other competitors	
1960	Budapest	No pairs competitors			
1961	Budapest	Mária Csordás; László Kondi	Mária Terlanday; Miklós Rácz	No other competitors	
1962	Budapest	Mária Csordás; László Kondi	Mária Terlanday; Miklós Rácz	No other competitors	
1963	Budapest	Mária Csordás; László Kondi	Mária Terlanday; Miklós Rácz	Edit Simsik; Mr. Kurucz	
1964	Budapest	Mária Csordás; László Kondi	Edit Simsik; Mr. Kurucz	No other competitors	
1965	Budapest	Mária Csordás; László Kondi	No other competitors		
1966	Budapest	Mária Csordás; László Kondi	No other competitors		
1967	Budapest	Ibolya Jakabffy; László Kondi	No other competitors		
1968	Budapest	Ibolya Jakabffy; László Kondi	No other competitors		
1969	Budapest	Ibolya Jakabffy; László Kondi	Éva Farkas; Tamas Korpás	No other competitors	
1970	Budapest	Éva Farkas; Tamas Korpás	No other competitors		
1971	Budapest	Éva Farkas; Gábor Kiliti	No other competitors		
1972	Budapest	Éva Farkas; Gábor Kiliti	No other competitors		
1973–2007	No pairs competitors				
2008	Budapest	Natalie Ganem; Kristóf Trefil	No other competitors		
2009	Budapest	No pairs competitors			
2010	Budapest	Viktória Hacht; Kristóf Trefil	No other competitors		
2011–15	No pairs competitors				
2016	(Czech Republic) Třinec	Anna Marie Pearce; Márk Magyar	No other competitors		
2017–19	No pairs competitors				
2020	(Czech Republic) Ostrava	Ioulia Chtchetinina; Márk Magyar	No other competitors		
2021	Budapest	Ioulia Chtchetinina; Márk Magyar	No other competitors		
2022	(Slovakia) Spišská Nová Ves	Ioulia Chtchetinina; Márk Magyar	Maria Pavlova; Balázs Nagy	No other competitors	
2023	Budapest	Maria Pavlova; Alexei Sviatchenko	No other competitors		
2024	(Czech Republic) Turnov	Maria Pavlova; Alexei Sviatchenko	No other competitors		
2025	(Poland) Cieszyn	No pairs competitors			
2026	(Slovakia) Prešov	Maria Pavlova; Alexei Sviatchenko	No other competitors		

=== Ice dance ===
Senior ice dance event medalists
Year	Location	Gold	Silver	Bronze	Ref.
1949	Budapest	Aranka Tóth; Endre Tóth	Edith Parádi; Josef Parádi	Ms. Helmerné; Mr. Tölgyesy	
1950	Budapest	Edith Parádi; Josef Parádi	Aranka Tóth; Endre Tóth	Ms. Helmerné; Mr. Regös	
1951	Budapest	Rozsa Madarász; Gyula Madarász	Aranka Tóth; Endre Tóth	Edith Parádi; Josef Parádi	
1952	Budapest	Aranka Tóth; Endre Tóth	Rozsa Madarász; Gyula Madarász	Edith Parádi; Josef Parádi	
1953	Budapest	Rozsa Madarász; Gyula Madarász	Edith Parádi; Josef Parádi	Aranka Tóth; Endre Tóth	
1954	Budapest	Rozsa Madarász; Gyula Madarász	Aranka Tóth; Endre Tóth	Edith Parádi; Josef Parádi	
1955	Budapest	Rozsa Madarász; Gyula Madarász	Aranka Tóth; Endre Tóth	Edith Parádi; Josef Parádi	
1956	Budapest	Rozsa Madarász; Gyula Madarász	Aranka Tóth; Endre Tóth	Györgyi Korda; Mr. Kertesi	
1957	Budapest	Alice Peters; Zoltán Tölgyesi	Aranka Tóth; Endre Tóth	Ms. Badacsonyi; Mr. Badacsonyi	
1958	Budapest	Aranka Tóth; Endre Tóth	Magda Porkoláb; Géza Hajós	Ms. Badacsonyi; Mr. Badacsonyi	
1959	Budapest	Györgyi Korda; Pál Vásárhelyi	Magda Porkoláb; Géza Hajós	Mária Kamarás; Elek Riedl	
1960	Budapest	Györgyi Korda; Pál Vásárhelyi	Magda Porkoláb; Géza Hajós	Mária Kamarás; Elek Riedl	
1961	Budapest	Györgyi Korda; Pál Vásárhelyi	Magda Porkoláb; Géza Hajós	Aranka Tóth; Endre Tóth	
1962	Budapest	Györgyi Korda; Pál Vásárhelyi	Magda Porkoláb; Géza Hajós	Ms. Mohai; Károly Csanádi	
1963	Budapest	Györgyi Korda; Pál Vásárhelyi	Edit Mató; Elek Riedl	Ms. Kéray; Mr. Lizák	
1964	Budapest	Györgyi Korda; Pál Vásárhelyi	Edit Mató; Elek Riedl	Ms. Csoma; Károly Csanádi	
1965	Budapest	Györgyi Korda; Pál Vásárhelyi	Edit Mató; Károly Csanádi	Ilona Berecz; István Sugár	
1966	Budapest	Edit Mató; Károly Csanádi	Ilona Berecz; István Sugár	Andrea Sepsy; Elek Riedl	
1967	Budapest	Edit Mató; Károly Csanádi	Ilona Berecz; István Sugár	Andrea Sepsy; Elek Riedl	
1968	Budapest	Edit Mató; Károly Csanádi	Ilona Berecz; István Sugár	Andrea Sepsy; Elek Riedl	
1969	Budapest	Edit Mató; Károly Csanádi	Ilona Berecz; István Sugár	Andrea Sepsy; Pál Ketting	
1970	Budapest	Ilona Berecz; István Sugár	Krisztina Regőczy; András Sallay	Andrea Sepsy; Pál Ketting	
1971	Budapest	Ilona Berecz; István Sugár	Krisztina Regőczy; András Sallay	Ms. Blahó; György Lénárt	
1972	Budapest	Krisztina Regőczy; András Sallay	Angéla Csörgö; Silvio Benussi	Andrea Dohány; Pál Ketting	
1973	Budapest	Krisztina Regőczy; András Sallay	Andrea Dohány; György Lénárt	Ms. Busa; Mr. Misota	
1974	Budapest	Krisztina Regőczy; András Sallay	Andrea Dohány; György Lénárt	No other competitors	
1975	Budapest	Krisztina Regőczy; András Sallay	Andrea Dohány; György Lénárt	Ms. Katona; Silvio Benussi	
1976	Budapest	Krisztina Regőczy; András Sallay	Andrea Dohány; György Lénárt	Ms. Kárpát; Mr. Palásthy	
1977	Budapest	Krisztina Regőczy; András Sallay	Gabriella Remport; Mr. Dobra	Ms. Szabó; Mr. A. Szabó	
1978	Budapest	Krisztina Regőczy; András Sallay	Ms. Kárpát; Mr. Palásthy	Gabriella Remport; Sándor Nagy	
1979	Budapest	Krisztina Regőczy; András Sallay	Gabriella Remport; Sándor Nagy	Judit Péterfy; Csaba Bálint	
1980	Budapest	Krisztina Regőczy; András Sallay	Gabriella Remport; Sándor Nagy	Judit Péterfy; Csaba Bálint	
1981	Budapest	Gabriella Remport; Sándor Nagy	Judit Péterfy; Csaba Bálint	Ms. R. Nagy; Mr. A. Szabó	
1982	Budapest	Judit Péterfy; Csaba Bálint	Ms. Világos; Mr. Béres	Ms. R. Nagy; Mr. A. Szabó	
1983	Budapest	Judit Péterfy; Csaba Bálint	Klára Engi; Attila Tóth	No other competitors	
1984	Budapest	Gabriella Remport; Sándor Nagy	Klára Engi; Attila Tóth	Kinga Wertán; János Demeter	
1985	Budapest	Klára Engi; Attila Tóth	Kinga Wertán; János Demeter	Ms. Gack; Mr. Gack	
1986	Budapest	Klára Engi; Attila Tóth	Kinga Wertán; János Demeter	Ms. E. Száraz; Mr. Partos	
1987	Budapest	Klára Engi; Attila Tóth	Kinga Wertán; János Demeter	Ms. Gack; Mr. Gack	
1988	Budapest	Klára Engi; Attila Tóth	Krisztina Kerekes; Csaba Szentpétery	Ms. Lengyel; Mr. Kolecsánszky	
1989	Budapest	Klára Engi; Attila Tóth	Krisztina Kerekes; Csaba Szentpétery	Ms. Lengyel; Mr. Kolecsánszky	
1990	Budapest	Klára Engi; Attila Tóth	Regina Woodward; Csaba Szentpétery	Krisztina Kerekes; Mr. Kolecsánszky	
1991	Budapest	Klára Engi; Attila Tóth	Krisztina Kerekes; Mr. Kolecsánszky	No other competitors	
1992–93	Budapest	No ice dance competitors			
1994	Budapest	Noémi Vedres; Endre Szentirmai	Enikő Berkes; Szilárd Tóth	No other competitors	
1995	Budapest	Enikő Berkes; Szilárd Tóth	Kornélia Bárány; Gyula Szombathelyi	Linda Tarjáni; Endre Szentirmai	
1996	Budapest	Enikő Berkes; Endre Szentirmai	Bianca Szíjgyártó; Szilárd Tóth	Mónika Schreier; Péter Schreier	
1997	Budapest	Bianca Szíjgyártó; Szilárd Tóth	Kornélia Bárány; András Rosnik	Erika Obrtál; Zoltán Papp	
1998	Budapest	Kornélia Bárány; András Rosnik	Bianca Szíjgyártó; Tamás Sári	No other competitors	
1999	Budapest	Bianca Szíjgyártó; Tamás Sári	Kornélia Bárány; András Rosnik	No other competitors	
2000	Dunaújváros	Zita Gebora; András Visontai	Andrea Hackl; Tamás Sári	Kornélia Bárány; András Rosnik	
2001	Dunaújváros	Zita Gebora; András Visontai	Andrea Hackl; Tamás Sári	Ms. Somogyi; Mr. Zsibrita	
2002	Budapest	Zita Gebora; András Visontai	Patricia Pavuk; András Rosnik	No other competitors	
2003	Budapest	Nóra Hoffmann; Attila Elek	Patricia Pavuk; András Rosnik	No other competitors	
2004	Budapest	Nóra Hoffmann; Attila Elek	Cassandra Nyerges; Balázs Gebhardt	No other competitors	
2005	Budapest	Nóra Hoffmann; Attila Elek	Ms. Lalátka; Mr. Bálint	Ms. Mándics; Mr. Sáritz	
2006	Budapest	Nóra Hoffmann; Attila Elek	Zsuzsanna Nagy; György Elek	No other competitors	
2007	Budapest	Nóra Hoffmann; Attila Elek	Zsuzsanna Nagy; György Elek	No other competitors	
2008	Budapest	Krisztina Barta; Ádám Tóth	No other competitors		
2009	Budapest	Nóra Hoffmann; Maxim Zavozin	No other competitors		
2010	Budapest	Nóra Hoffmann; Maxim Zavozin	Zsuzsanna Nagy; Máté Fejes	No other competitors	
2011	Budapest	Nóra Hoffmann; Maxim Zavozin	Zsuzsanna Nagy; Máté Fejes	Dóra Turóczi; Balázs Major	
2012	Budapest	Zsuzsanna Nagy; Máté Fejes	Dóra Turóczi; Balázs Major	No other competitors	
2013	Budapest	Zsuzsanna Nagy; Máté Fejes	Dóra Turóczi; Balázs Major	Tamara Turóczi; Daniel Mayer	
2014	(Slovakia) Bratislava	Dóra Turóczi; Balázs Major	No other competitors		
2015	Budapest	Szilvia Magyar; Dániel Majer	Beatrix Pipek; József Kalman	No other competitors	
2016–17	No ice dance competitors				
2018	(Slovakia) Košice	Anna Yanovskaya; Ádám Lukács	No other competitors		
2019	Budapest	Anna Yanovskaya; Ádám Lukács	Emily Monaghan; Ilias Fourati	Beatrice Tomczak; Dániel Illés	
2020	(Czech Republic) Ostrava	Emily Monaghan; Ilias Fourati	Leia Dozzi; Michael Valdez	No other competitors	
2021	Budapest	Anna Yanovskaya; Ádám Lukács	Emese Csiszér; Axel Lamasse	No other competitors	
2022	(Slovakia) Spišská Nová Ves	Mariia Ignateva; Danijil Szemko	No other competitors		
2023	Budapest	Mariia Ignateva; Danijil Szemko	Lucy Hancock; Ilias Fourati	No other competitors	
2024	(Czech Republic) Turnov	Mariia Ignateva; Danijil Szemko	Lucy Hancock; Ilias Fourati	Emese Csiszér; Mark Shapiro	
2025	(Poland) Cieszyn	Mariia Ignateva; Danijil Szemko	Lucy Hancock; Ilias Fourati	Emese Csiszér; Mark Shapiro	
2026	(Slovakia) Prešov	Mariia Ignateva; Danijil Szemko	Emese Csiszér; Mark Shapiro	Lara Luft; Iliász Fourati	

== Junior medalists ==
=== Men's singles ===
Junior men's event medalists
Year	Location	Gold	Silver	Bronze	Ref.
2011–13	Budapest	No junior men's competitors			
2014	Budapest	Alexander Borovoj	No other competitors		
2015	Budapest	Alexander Borovoj	Alexander Maszljanko	András Csernoch	
2016	Debrecen	Alexander Maszljanko	Máté Böröcz	Alexander Borovoj	
2017	Budapest	Alexander Borovoj	Máté Böröcz	András Csernoch	
2018	Budapest	Alexander Borovoj	Máté Böröcz	András Csernoch	
2019	Budapest	Tamás Szoboszlai	No other competitors		
2020	Budapest	Mózes József Berei	No other competitors		
2021	Budapest	Aleksandr Vlasenko	No other competitors		
2022	Budapest	Aleksandr Vlasenko	Mózes József Berei	Máté Csaba	
2023	Budapest	Aleksandr Vlasenko	Aleksei Vlasenko	Máté Csaba	
2024	Budapest	Aleksei Vlasenko	Benedek Dózsa	Kolos Rác	
2025	Budapest	Aleksei Vlasenko	Benedek Dózsa	Kolos Rác	
2026	Budapest	Aleksei Vlasenko	Benedek Dózsa	No other competitors	

=== Women's singles ===
Junior women's event medalists
Year	Location	Gold	Silver	Bronze	Ref.
2011	Budapest	Regina Borbély	Viktória Chiappa	Vanda Kovács	
2012	Budapest	Eszter Szombathelyi	Vanda Kovács	Viktória Chiappa	
2013	Budapest	Ivett Tóth	Bianka Friesz	Laura Hammes	
2014	Budapest	Bianka Friesz	Dorka Havasi	Virág Molnár	
2015	Budapest	Fruzsina Medgyesi	Júlia Bátori	Bianka Friesz	
2016	Debrecen	Ivett Tóth	Fruzsina Medgyesi	Júlia Bátori	
2017	Budapest	Dária Jakab	Júlia Bátori	Mira Baráth	
2018	Budapest	Júlia Láng	Dóra Nagy	Csenge Rabb	
2019	Budapest	Dóra Nagy	Júlia Láng	Bernadett Szigeti	
2020	Budapest	Regina Schermann	Lili Krizsanovszki	Nikolett Albrechtovics	
2021	Budapest	Bernadett Szigeti	Regina Schermann	Katinka Zsembéry	
2022	Budapest	Vivien Papp	Regina Schermann	Katinka Zsembéry	
2023	Budapest	Polina Dzsumanyijazova	Léna Ekker	Daria Zsirnov	
2024	Budapest	Polina Dzsumanyijazova	Martina Major	Boglárka Zhang	
2025	Budapest	Polina Dzsumanyijazova	Léna Ekker	Zsófia Stéplaki	
2026	Budapest	Polina Dzsumanyijazova	Zsófia Stéplaki	Martina Major	

=== Pairs ===
Junior pairs event medalists
Year	Location	Gold	Silver	Bronze	Ref.
No junior pairs competitors prior to 2026
2026	(Slovakia) Prešov	Lily Wilberforce; Mózes József Berei	No other competitors		

=== Ice dance ===
Junior ice dance event medalists
Year	Location	Gold	Silver	Bronze	Ref.
2011	Budapest	Mária Dér; Daniel Majer	Liliána Király; Szabolcs Nagy	No other competitors	
2012	Budapest	Szidónia Merkwart; Ádám Lukács	Adrienn Szemes; Dániel Szénási	Viktória Török; Martin Szénási	
2013	Budapest	Szilvia Magyar; Dániel Illés	Lili Király; Szabolcs Nagy	Adrienn Szemes; Dániel Szénási	
2014	Budapest	Carolina Moscheni; Ádám Lukács	Réka Staudt; Máté Staudt	Beatrix Pipek; József Kálmán	
2015	Budapest	Carolina Moscheni; Ádám Lukács	Hanna Jakucs; Dániel Illés	Petra Garai; Dávid Orosházi	
2016	(Czech Republic) Třinec	Kimberly Wei; Illiász Fourati	Villő Márton; Danyil Semko	Hanna Jakucs; Dániel Illés	
2017	(Poland) Katowice	Hanna Jakucs; Dániel Illés	No other competitors		
2018	(Slovakia) Košice	Villő Márton; Danyil Semko	Hanna Jakucs; Alessio Galli	Lorena Bubcso; Alfred Soregi-Niksz	
2019	Budapest	Villő Márton; Danyil Semko	Adelina Zvezdova; Alfred Soregi-Niksz	No other competitors	
2020	(Czech Republic) Ostrava	Villő Márton; Danyil Semko	Katica Kedves; Fedor Sharonov	Petra Csikós; Patrik Csikós	
2021	Budapest	Katica Kedves; Fedor Sharonov	Petra Csikós; Patrik Csikós	No other competitors	
2022	(Slovakia) Spišská Nová Ves	Réka Leveles; Balázs Leveles	Petra Csikós; Patrik Csikós	No other competitors	
2023	Budapest	Maya Benkiewics; Mark Shapiro	No other competitors		
2024	(Czech Republic) Turnov	Villő Szilágyi; István Jaracs	No other competitors		
2025	(Poland) Cieszyn	Villő Szilágyi; István Jaracs	No other competitors		
2026	(Slovakia) Prešov	Villő Szilágyi; István Jaracs	Aletta Lanyi; Huba Gallai	Diane Gallix; Elod Egyed-Zsigmond	

== Records ==
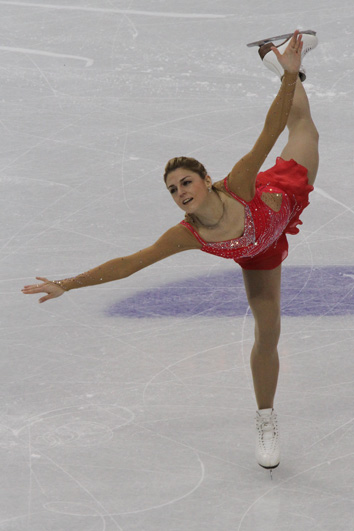
Júlia Sebestyén won nine Hungarian Championship titles in women's singles.

Records
Discipline	Most championship titles			
Discipline	Skater(s)	No.	Years	Ref.
Men's singles	László Vajda	10	1970–79	
Women's singles	Júlia Sebestyén	9	2002–10	
Pairs	László Kondi; (Note: László Kondi won one Hungarian Championship title with Mária Terlanday (1959), six with Mária Csordás (1961–66), and three with Ibolya Jakabffy (1967–69).)	10	1959; 1961–69	
Ice dance	Krisztina Regőczy; András Sallay	9	2002–04; 2006–10	
