= Fruzsina Medgyesi =

Hungarian figure skater

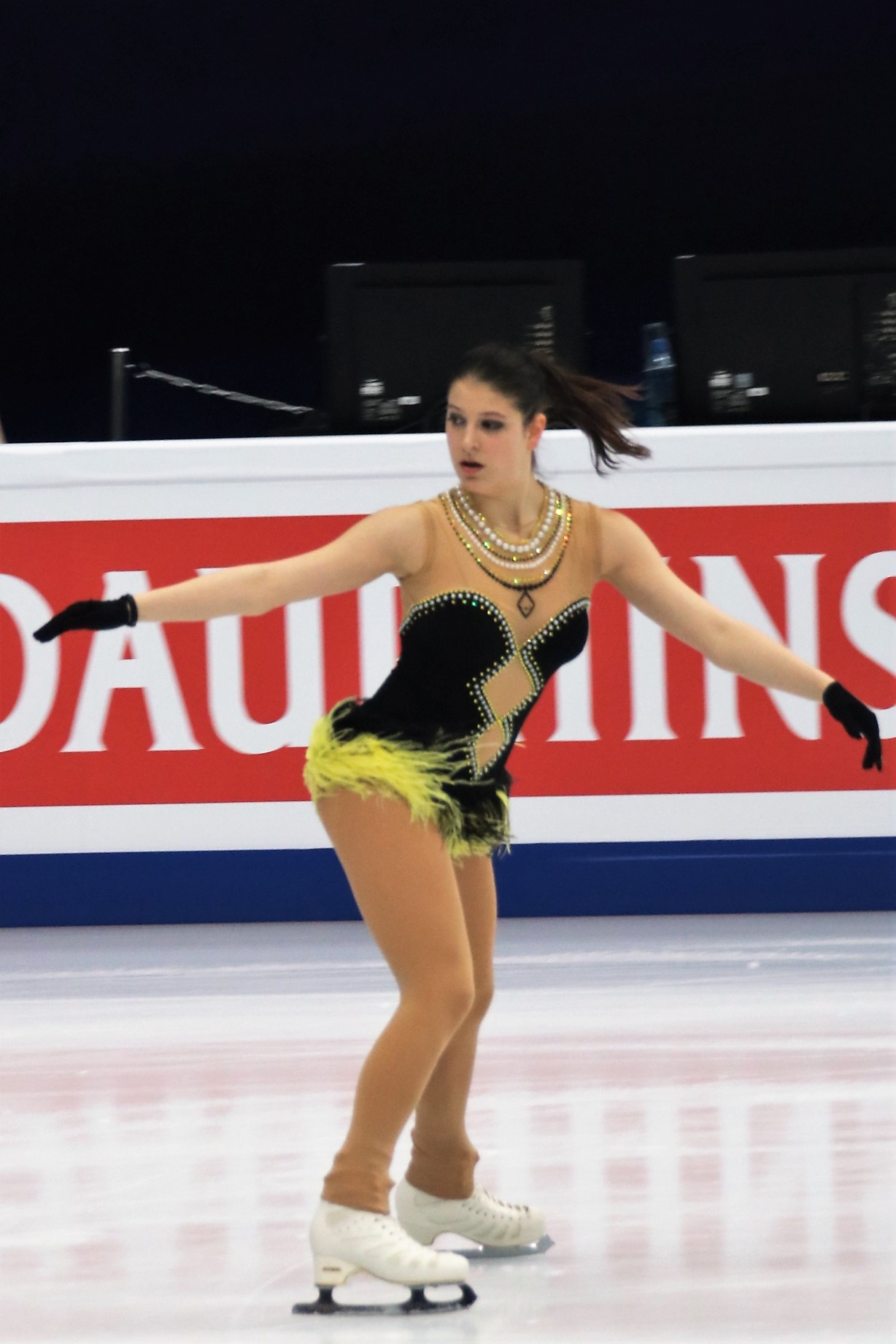

Personal information
- Born: 18 June 1999 (age 27) Budapest, Hungary
- Height: 1.64 m (5 ft 4 1/2 in)

Figure skating career
- Country: Hungary
- Coach: Szabolcs Vidrai
- Skating club: Vasas SC
- Began skating: 2004

Fruzsina Medgyesi (born 18 June 1999) is a Hungarian figure skater. She is the 2016 Skate Helena champion, the 2018 Hungarian national champion, and a two-time Hungarian national silver medalist.

On the junior level, she is the 2016 Youth Olympics team event bronze medalist, and the 2015 Santa Claus Cup champion.

== Career ==
=== Early years ===
Medgyesi began learning to skate in 2004. She made her first appearance on the junior international level in November 2013, at Skate Celje. Her senior international debut came at the Hellmut Seibt Memorial in February 2015.

=== 2015–2016 season ===
Medgyesi competed at her first ISU Junior Grand Prix (JGP) assignment in August 2015, in Slovakia, and at her first ISU Challenger Series event, the 2015 CS Mordovian Ornament, in October. Her first senior international medal, gold, came at Skate Helena in January 2016.

In February 2016, she placed 14th in her individual event at the 2016 Winter Youth Olympics in Hamar, Norway. A member of Team Discovery, she won the bronze medal in the team event.

=== 2016–2017 season ===
Medgyesi placed 8th at both of her JGP assignments, in Estonia and the Czech Republic. In March 2017, she competed at her first ISU Championships – the 2017 World Junior Championships in Taipei, Taiwan. Ranked 32nd in the short program, she did not advance to the free skate. During the summer, she relocated to Bergamo, Italy, where Franca Bianconi and Rosanna Murante became her coach.

=== 2017–2018 season ===
In December 2017, Medgyesi won the Hungarian national title ahead of defending champion Ivett Tóth. Both skaters were assigned to the 2018 European Championships in Moscow. She relocated to Budapest and Szabolcs Vidrai became her coach again.

== Programs ==
Season	Short program	Free skating
2017–2018	Burlesque; A Guy Takes His Time; Tough Lover performed by Christina Aguilera choreo. by Zoltán Tóth	Historia de un Amor performed by Laura Fygi; Yo Soy Maria by Gidon Kremer choreo. by Nora Hoffmann
2016–2017	Nuvole Bianche by Ludovico Einaudi choreo. by Zoltán Tóth	Historia de un Amor performed by Laura Fygi; Yo Soy Maria by Gidon Kremer choreo. by Nora Hoffmann
2015–2016	The Mountain by Ludovico Einaudi choreo. by Zoltán Tóth	Youth by Benoît Jutras; The Mission by Ennio Morricone; Gabriel's Oboe; Asuncion; The Falls choreo. by Zoltán Tóth

== Competitive highlights ==
CS: Challenger Series; JGP: Junior Grand Prix

International
Event	13–14	14–15	15–16	16–17	17–18	18–19	19–20
Europeans					28th		
CS Lombardia				14th	12th		WD
CS Ice Challenge			14th				
CS Mordovian			9th				
CS Warsaw Cup					7th		
Bavarian Open				7th			
Crystal Skate						8th	
Cup of Tyrol					9th	16th	
Dragon Trophy						11th	
Golden Bear				5th			19th
Halloween Cup						8th	9th
Hellmut Seibt		9th					
Jegvirag Cup						6th	
Santa Claus Cup			11th		10th		7th
Skate Helena			1st				
Sportland Trophy			5th				
Triglav Trophy		4th					
Volvo Open Cup						16th	23rd
International: Junior
Junior Worlds				32nd			
Youth Olympics			14th				
JGP Czech Rep.				8th			
JGP Estonia				8th			
JGP Slovakia			16th				
JGP Spain			22nd				
EYOF		9th					
Golden Bear	6th						
Ice Challenge		23rd					
Lombardia Trophy		14th					
Santa Claus Cup		1st					
Skate Celje	13th						
Sportland Trophy		3rd					
Tirnavia Ice Cup		2nd					
National
Hungary			2nd		1st	2nd	3rd
Team events
Youth Olympics			3rd T 8th P				
J = Junior level; TBD = Assigned; T = Team result; P = Personal result.
