= Bianca Szíjgyártó =

Hungarian ice dancer (born 1981)

Personal information
- Born: 29 June 1981 (age 45) Debrecen, Hungary
- Height: 1.65 m (5 ft 5 in)

Figure skating career
- Country: Hungary
- Partner: Tamás Sári; Szilárd Tóth
- Skating club: Golden Skate Club
- Began skating: 1985
- Retired: 1999

Bianka Szíjgyártó is a former Hungarian competitive ice dancer. She is a two time Hungarian national champion. With Szilárd Tóth, she won her 1st national title. The duo competed in the final segment at the 1997 European Championships in Paris, France, and at the 1997 World Championships in Lausanne, Switzerland. When that partnership ended, she teamed up with Tamás Sári. She won her 2nd national title with him and the team competed in the final segment at the 1999 European Championships in Prague, Czech Republic. They trained in Budapest, Hungary and were coached by Gabriella Remport and Sándor Nagy.

After retiring from competition, Szíjgyártó skated professionally in ice shows. She coaches at Cornerstone Ice Arena in Lockport, NY

== Programs ==
=== With Sári ===
Season	Original dance	Free dance
1998–1999		Ziganochka (Russian gipsy dance)

=== With Tóth ===
Season	Original dance	Free dance
1996–1997		The Two Guitars by Paul Mauriat

== Results ==
=== With Sári ===
International
Event	1997–98	1998–99
European Championships		23rd
Golden Spin of Zagreb	6th	5th
Karl Schäfer Memorial		6th
Skate Israel	7th	8th
National
Hungarian Championships		1st

=== With Tóth ===
International
Event	1995–96	1996–97
World Championships		27th
European Championships		24th
Finlandia Trophy	10th	8th
Golden Spin of Zagreb		5th
Pavel Roman Memorial	4th	
National
Hungarian Championships	2nd	1st
