= Diána Póth =

Hungarian figure skater

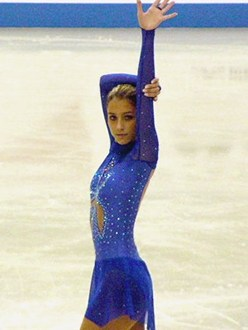
- Poth in 2003.

Personal information
- Born: 6 August 1981 (age 45) Budapest, Hungary
- Height: 1.65 m (5 ft 5 in)

Figure skating career
- Country: Hungary
- Coach: Gurgen Vardanjan, Jeranjak Ipakjan, István Simon, Tamara Téglássy, Eszter Jurek
- Skating club: Iceberg Skating Club, Budapest
- Retired: 2006

Diána Póth (born 6 August 1981) is a Hungarian former competitive figure skater. She is a two-time Karl Schäfer Memorial silver medalist and a two-time Hungarian national champion. She also competed briefly for Austria.

== Personal life ==
Póth was born on 6 August 1981 in Budapest, Hungary. She moved to Austria in 2001 and returned to Hungary in October 2002. Her mother is Austrian. Her father was a hockey player.

Póth is married to professional footballer Gábor Gyepes.

== Career ==
Póth began figure skating at the age of four to combat her nerves. Her first coach was Tamara Téglássy, with whom she was most successful as a junior. After the 1998 Worlds Championships, where she finished 10th, she switched coaches and began to train with Andras Szaraz and Eszter Jurek. Póth achieved her best result, 4th, at a European Championships in 1999.

Póth won two Hungarian national titles in 1999 and 2000. She competed in the Austrian Championships in 2002.

After a couple of injuries, Póth switched coaches again and began training with Jeranjak Ipakjan and Gurgen Vardanjan. In April 2007, Poth retired from competition. She began coaching at a Cardiff skating club. One of her students won the junior national championship.

== Programs ==
Season	Short program	Free skating
2004–05	Allegretto by Karl Jenkins	"Don't Let Me Be Misunderstood" by B. Benjamin, S. Marcus Santa Esmeralda; Besame Mucho; Another Cha Cha by J. Goingc Santa Esmeralda
2003–04	Csárdás (modern arrangement) by Zoltan Maga	The Question of U by Prince; Xotica by Rene Dupere
2002–03	Music performed by Richard Clayderman	Romeo and Juliet Pyotr Ilyich Tchaikovsky
1999–2000	Still Got the Blues (For You) by Gary Moore	Music by Gipsy Kings; Music by Santa Esmeralda
1998–99	Black Velvet	Gone with the Wind by Max Steiner
1996–98	Don't Cry for Me Argentina (from Evita by Andrew Lloyd Webber	Samson and Delila

== Results ==
GP: Grand Prix; JGP: Junior Series/Junior Grand Prix

International
Event	93–94	94–95	95–96	96–97	97–98	98–99	99–00	00–01	01–02	02–03	03–04	04–05	05–06
Worlds					10th	11th	14th						
Europeans			19th	20th		4th	11th			17th		18th	
GP Cup of Russia							5th			9th	6th		
GP Lalique						6th	6th	11th					
GP NHK Trophy											7th		
GP Skate Canada						7th		8th					
Copenhagen Trophy										2nd			
Finlandia Trophy			8th			7th	7th			6th			
Golden Spin				4th							2nd	3rd	9th
Nepela Memorial		5th											
Schäfer Memorial				7th	10th						2nd	2nd	
Skate Israel				6th							1st		
Sofia Cup		3rd		1st									
International: Junior
Junior Worlds		28th	15th										
JGP Bulgaria					7th								
JGP Hungary					4th								
EYOF				6th									
Blue Swords	20th J.												
Grand Prize SNP			1st J.										
Penta Cup			2nd J.										
PFSA Trophy				3rd J.									
Triglav Trophy	7th J.	5th J.											
National
Hungarian Champ.		3rd	2nd	2nd	3rd	1st	1st	3rd		2nd	4th	2nd	2nd
Austrian Champ.									2nd				
WD = Withdrew
