= István Simon =

Figure skating career
- Country: Hungary
- Retired: c. 1981

István Simon is a Hungarian figure skating coach and former competitor. He won two Hungarian national titles in the early 1980s and competed at the 1980 European Championships in Gothenburg. After retiring from competition, he became a skating coach in Budapest. He is the former coach of Diána Póth, Szabolcs Vidrai, Viktória Pavuk, and Ivett Tóth.

== Competitive highlights ==
International
| Event | 1976–77 | 1979–80 | 1980–81 |
|---|---|---|---|
| European Championships | | 19th | |
| Blue Swords | 6th | | |
| NHK Trophy | | 10th | 11th |
National
| Hungarian Championships | | 1st | 1st |
