= Szilárd Tóth =

Hungarian ice dancer (born 1973)

Personal information
- Born: 17 August 1973 (age 53) Budapest, Hungary
- Height: 1.81 m (5 ft 11 1/2 in)

Figure skating career
- Country: Hungary
- Partner: Bianca Szíjgyártó; Enikő Berkes
- Coach: Gabriella Remport; Ilona Berecz
- Skating club: Student Skating Sport Club Budapest
- Began skating: 1982
- Retired: c. 1997

Szilárd Tóth (born 17 August 1973) is a Hungarian former competitive ice dancer. With Enikő Berkes, he is the 1993 Golden Spin of Zagreb bronze medalist and 1994 national champion. They represented Hungary at the 1994 Winter Olympics.

== Career ==
=== Partnership with Berkes ===
Tóth began his partnership with Enikő Berkes by 1991. They competed in the final segment at four ISU Championships, placing 15th at the 1992 World Junior Championships in Hull, Quebec, Canada; 20th at the 1993 European Championships in Helsinki, Finland; 24th at the 1994 European Championships in Copenhagen, Denmark; and 23rd at the 1995 European Championships in Dortmund, Germany.

Berkes/Tóth were named in Hungary's team to the 1994 Winter Olympics in Hamar. They finished 20th in Norway.

=== Partnership with Szíjgyártó ===
Ahead of the 1995–1996 season, Tóth teamed up with Bianca Szíjgyártó. The two were coached by Gabriella Remport and Ilona Berecz. In their second season together, they won the Hungarian national title and were assigned to two ISU Championships. At the 1997 European Championships in Paris, they qualified to the free dance and finished 24th overall. They were eliminated after the original dance at the 1997 World Championships in Lausanne, Switzerland.

=== Post-competitive career ===
Tóth has served as an International Skating Union judge for ice dancing.

== Programs ==
(with Szijgyarto)

Season	Original dance	Free dance
1996–1997		The Two Guitars by Paul Mauriat

== Results ==
=== With Berkes ===
International
Event	1991–92	1992–93	1993–94	1994–95
Winter Olympics			20th	
European Champ.		20th	24th	23rd
Trophée de France				11th
Golden Spin			3rd	
Nebelhorn Trophy			13th	
P. Roman Memorial		7th		
Penta Cup			4th	
Piruetten			10th	
Schäfer Memorial		11th	7th	
Sofia Cup	4th			
Ukrainian Souvenir			3rd	
International: Junior
World Junior Champ.	15th			
Grand Prize SNP	8th			
National
Hungarian Champ.		2nd	1st	

=== With Szíjgyártó ===
International
Event	1995–96	1996–97
World Championships		27th
European Championships		24th
Finlandia Trophy	10th	8th
Golden Spin of Zagreb		5th
Pavel Roman Memorial	4th	
National
Hungarian Championships	2nd	1st
