= Kornélia Pongo =

Hungarian ice dancer (born 1976)

Personal information
- Other names: Kornélia Bárány
- Born: 15 September 1976 (age 50) Budapest, Hungary
- Height: 1.64 m (5 ft 4 1/2 in)

Figure skating career
- Country: Hungary
- Partner: András Rosnik, Gyula Szombathelyi, Peter Schreier
- Coach: Gabriella Remport
- Began skating: 1982
- Retired: c. 2000

Kornélia Pongo, née Bárány (born 15 September 1976) is a Hungarian former competitive ice dancer. With András Rosnik, she is the 1996 Ondrej Nepela Memorial champion and the 1998 Hungarian national champion. They competed together at three ISU Championships and four Grand Prix events.

Pongo competed as Kornélia Bárány. She and Rosnik trained mainly in Budapest, coached by Gabriella Remport. Earlier in her career, she competed in partnership with Peter Schreier and Gyula Szombathelyi, appearing at three ISU Championships.

== Programs ==
(with Rosnik)

Season	Original dance	Free dance
1998–1999		Cha Cha Cha; Blues by Pérez Prado

== Competitive highlights ==
GP: Grand Prix

=== With Rosnik ===
International
Event	96–97	97–98	98–99	99–00
World Championships		29th	28th	
European Championships		21st		
GP Cup of Russia			10th	
GP Skate America				7th
GP Skate Canada			10th	8th
Golden Spin of Zagreb		4th		
Karl Schäfer Memorial	10th	11th	5th	
Ondrej Nepela Memorial	1st	4th		
Skate Israel			9th	
National
Hungarian Championships		1st		

=== With Szombathelyi ===
International
Event	1994–95
World Championships	28th
National
Hungarian Championships	2nd

=== With Schreier ===
International
Event	1992–93	1993–94
World Junior Championships	17th	19th
