= András Rosnik =

Hungarian ice dancer (born 1977)

Personal information
- Born: 31 May 1977 (age 49) Budapest, Hungary
- Height: 1.70 m (5 ft 7 in)

Figure skating career
- Country: Hungary
- Partner: Patricia Pavuk, Kornélia Bárány
- Coach: Gabriella Remport
- Skating club: Jumping Jack
- Began skating: 1986
- Retired: c. 2003

András Rosnik (born 31 May 1977) is a Hungarian former competitive ice dancer. With Kornélia Bárány, he is the 1996 Ondrej Nepela Memorial champion and the 1998 Hungarian national champion. They competed together at three ISU Championships and four Grand Prix events.

Bárány and Rosnik trained mainly in Budapest, coached by Gabriella Remport. After their partnership ended, he competed with Patricia Pavuk.

== Programs ==
(with Bárány)

Season	Original dance	Free dance
1998–1999		Cha Cha Cha; Blues by Pérez Prado

== Competitive highlights ==
GP: Grand Prix

=== With Pavuk ===
International
Event	2001–02	2002–03
Golden Spin of Zagreb		12th
Ondrej Nepela Memorial	6th	5th
National
Hungarian Championships	3rd	2nd

=== With Bárány ===
International
Event	96–97	97–98	98–99	99–00
World Championships		29th	28th	
European Championships		21st		
GP Cup of Russia			10th	
GP Skate America				7th
GP Skate Canada			10th	8th
Golden Spin of Zagreb		4th		
Karl Schäfer Memorial	10th	11th	5th	
Ondrej Nepela Memorial	1st	4th		
Skate Israel			9th	
National
Hungarian Championships		1st		
