= Márton Markó =

Hungarian figure skater

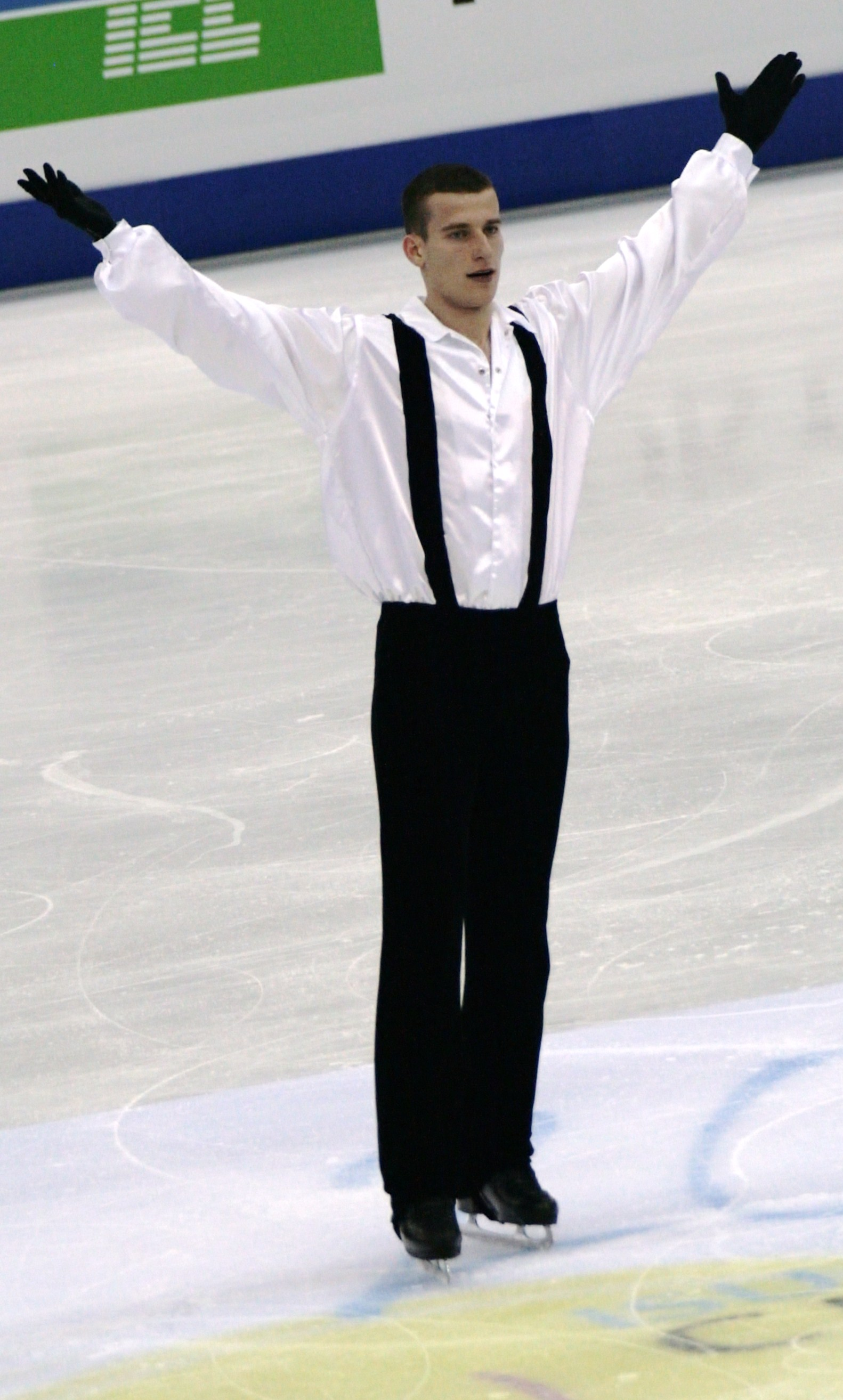
- Markó in 2012

Personal information
- Born: 7 December 1988 (age 37) Budapest, Hungary
- Home town: Budapest
- Height: 1.87 m (6 ft 1 1/2 in)

Figure skating career
- Country: Hungary
- Partner: Abby Kimmelman
- Coach: Ildiko Magyar, Andras Szaraz, Gayane Akopjan
- Skating club: BP Vasas SC
- Began skating: 1991

Márton Markó (born 7 December 1988) is a Hungarian former competitive figure skater. He is a four-time Hungarian national champion.

== Programs ==
Season	Short program	Free skating
2013–14	The Hunger Games by James Newton Howard	Transformers by Steve Jablonsky
2011–12	Violin mix	Sherlock Holmes by Hans Zimmer
2009–10	Armageddon	Stardust

== Competitive highlights ==
International
Event	06–07	07–08	08–09	09–10	10–11	11–12	12–13	13–14
Worlds						21st P		
Europeans				33rd		14th P		
Crystal Skate			11th		7th	11th		
Golden Bear								3rd
Golden Spin							9th	9th
Ice Challenge				28th		21st		
Nebelhorn Trophy								31st
Nepela Memorial					11th			
New Year's Cup							6th	3rd
Istanbul Cup						9th		
International: Junior
JGP Croatia		25th						
National
Hungarian	2nd		2nd	1st	3rd	1st	1st	1st
JGP = Junior Grand Prix; P = Preliminary round
