= György Czakó =

Hungarian figure skater (1933–2023)

Personal information
- Full name: György Czakó
- Born: 11 July 1933 Budapest, Hungary
- Died: 9 February 2023 (aged 89) Budapest, Hungary

Figure skating career
- Country: Hungary
- Skating club: Csepeli Vasas

György Czakó (11 July 1933 – 9 February 2023) was a Hungarian figure skater. He was a three-time (1951, 1952, 1954) Hungarian national champion. He represented Hungary at the 1952 Winter Olympics where he placed 12th. He was the father of Krisztina Czakó.

== Career ==
György Czakó started skating at age 6 at the suggestion of a paediatrician. He won the Hungarian Figure Skating Championships three times and competed at the European Figure Skating Championships, the World Figure Skating Championships, and the 1952 Winter Olympics. He won the silver medal at the 1955 Winter Universiade. The Czako jump is named after him.

After his retirement from competitive skating, he toured professionally. He joined the Ice-Revue in 1958. He performed on numerous shows as the soloist of the Hungarian Ice-Revue and performed in the film Napfény a jégen. After the Ice-Revue closed, he worked as a mechanical engineer in a designing office. He also worked as a coach. He was the president of the Budapesti Korcsolyázó Egylet.

== Personal life and death ==
Czakó died on 9 February 2023, at the age of 89.

== Competitive highlights ==
International
Event	1950	1951	1952	1953	1954	1955	1956
Winter Olympics			12th				
World Champ.				13th			
European Champ.			8th	8th		9th	
Winter Universiade				4th		2nd	
National
Hungarian Champ.	3rd	1st	1st		1st	2nd	2nd
