= György Elek =

Hungarian ice dancer (born 1984)

Personal information
- Born: 2 May 1984 (age 42) Budapest, Hungary
- Height: 1.73 m (5 ft 8 in)

Figure skating career
- Country: Hungary
- Partner: Zsuzsanna Nagy; Regina Szabo
- Coach: Sándor Nagy; Gabriella Remport
- Skating club: Rozmaring SE Budapest

György Elek (born 2 May 1984) is a Hungarian former competitive ice dancer. With Zsuzsanna Nagy, he is a two-time national silver medalist. They competed in the final segment at four ISU Championships and also appeared on the senior Grand Prix series.

== Personal life ==
Elek was born on 2 May 1984 in Budapest, Hungary. He is the younger brother of Hungarian ice dancer Attila Elek.

== Career ==
Elek's partnership with Regina Szabo began by 2001. They competed at four ISU Junior Grand Prix events.

Elek teamed up with Zsuzsanna Nagy in the middle of the 2002–2003 season. The two qualified to the final segment at the 2003 World Junior Championships in Ostrava, Czech Republic, and the 2004 World Junior Championships in The Hague, Netherlands.

After moving up to the senior level, in the 2005–2006 season, Nagy/Elek appeared at two Grand Prix events and became two-time national silver medalists. They competed in the free dance at the 2006 European Championships in Lyon, France, and 2007 European Championships in Warsaw, Poland. They competed in the original dance at the 2007 World Championships in Tokyo, Japan, but did not advance to the free dance.

Nagy/Elek were coached by her parents, Sándor Nagy and Gabriella Remport. Their partnership ended around 2007.

== Programs ==
(with Nagy)

Season	Original dance	Free dance
2006–2007	Assassin's Tango (from Mr. & Mrs. Smith) by John Powell	Romeo and Juliet by Nino Rota performed by Edvin Marton; Romeo + Juliet by Nellee Hooper, Craig Armstrong, Marius de Vries
2005–2006	Cha Cha; Rhumba; Samba	Carmina Burana by Carl Orff; Black Angel both performed by Edvin Marton
2004–2005	Steppin' Out with My Baby by Irving Berlin	Carmina Burana by Carl Orff performed by Edvin Marton
2003–2004	Rock 'n Roll; Blues; Rock 'n Roll	Objection (Tango) by Shakira
2002–2003	Waltz; Polka by Johann Strauss	Quidam (from Cirque du Soleil) by Benoît Jutras

== Competitive highlights ==
JGP: Junior Grand Prix

=== With Nagy ===
International
Event	02–03	03–04	04–05	05–06	06–07
World Champ.					26th
European Champ.				21st	20th
GP Trophée Bompard					12th
GP NHK Trophy					11th
Golden Spin				5th	
Skate Israel				5th	
International: Junior
World Junior Champ.	23rd	16th			
JGP Croatia		7th			
JGP Hungary			6th		
JGP Mexico		8th			
JGP United States			7th		
EYOF	9th				
National
Hungarian Champ.	1st J			2nd	2nd
J = Junior level

=== With Szabo ===
International
Event	2001–02	2002–03
JGP Czech Republic	8th	
JGP Germany		14th
JGP Italy		16th
JGP Netherlands	14th	
