= Zsuzsanna Nagy =

Hungarian ice dancer (born 1986)

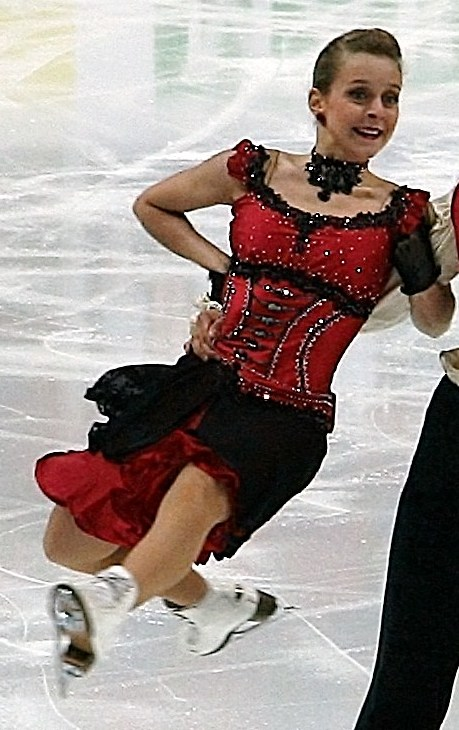
- Nagy in 2011

Personal information
- Born: 10 June 1986 (age 40) Budapest, Hungary
- Height: 1.64 m (5 ft 5 in)

Figure skating career
- Country: Hungary
- Partner: Máté Fejes, György Elek, David Kriska
- Coach: Sándor Nagy, Elena Kustarova, Gabriella Remport
- Skating club: BP Spartacus
- Began skating: 1996
- Retired: 2013

Zsuzsanna Nagy (born 10 June 1986) is a Hungarian former competitive ice dancer. With Máté Fejes, she is the 2011 Pavel Roman Memorial champion and a two-time Hungarian national champion. They competed in the final segment at two European Championships. With György Elek, she competed in the free dance at four ISU Championships and also appeared on the senior Grand Prix series.

== Personal life ==
Zsuzsanna Nagy was born 10 June 1986 in Budapest, Hungary. She is the daughter of Hungarian ice dancers Gabriella Remport and Sándor Nagy.

== Career ==
=== Early career ===
Nagy began skating with David Kriska by 2000. They appeared at three ISU Junior Grand Prix events. They last competed together in early November 2002.

=== Partnership with Elek ===
Nagy teamed up with György Elek in the middle of the 2002–2003 season. The two qualified to the final segment at the 2003 World Junior Championships in Ostrava, Czech Republic, and the 2004 World Junior Championships in The Hague, Netherlands.

After moving up to the senior level, in the 2005–2006 season, Nagy/Elek appeared at two Grand Prix events and became two-time national silver medalists. They competed in the free dance at the 2006 European Championships in Lyon, France, and 2007 European Championships in Warsaw, Poland. They competed in the original dance at the 2007 World Championships in Tokyo, Japan, but did not advance to the free dance.

Nagy/Elek were coached by her parents. Their partnership ended around 2007.

=== Partnership with Fejes ===
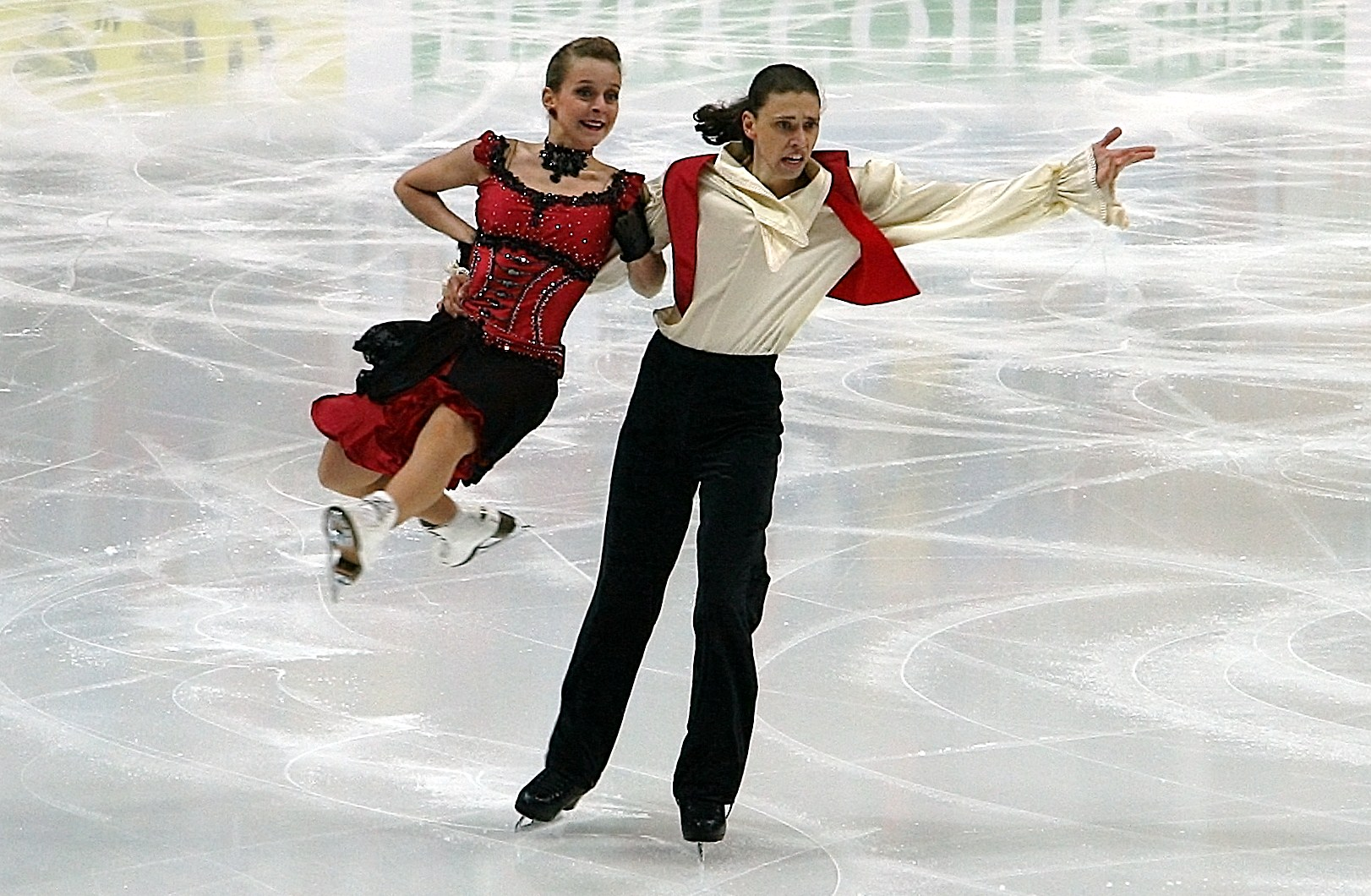
Nagy and Fejes in 2011

Nagy began competing with Fejes in 2009. She broke her skull bone in November 2011 while they were practicing a lift. They became two-time national champions and appeared at six ISU Championships. They competed in the final segment at the 2012 European Championships in Sheffield, England, and 2013 European Championships in Zagreb, Croatia. They competed in the short dance at the 2012 World Championships in Nice, France, and 2013 World Championships in London, Ontario. They were coached by her father.

== Programs ==
=== With Fejes ===
Season	Short dance	Free dance
2012–2013	My Sweet And Tender Beast by Eugen Doga	Adagio for Strings by Il Divo
2011–2012	Rhumba; Samba	Minnie the Moocher (from The Blues Brothers); Why Don't You Do Right? (from Who Framed Roger Rabbit); Mr. Pinstripe Suit by Big Bad Voodoo Daddy
2010–2011	La Foule; Les Flonflons du Bal by Édith Piaf	The Barber of Seville by Gioachino Rossini
	Original dance	
2009–2010	Serbian gypsy dance	Adagio - Question of Honor

=== With Elek ===
Season	Original dance	Free dance
2006–2007	Assassin's Tango (from Mr. & Mrs. Smith) by John Powell	Romeo and Juliet by Nino Rota performed by Edvin Marton; Romeo + Juliet by Nellee Hooper, Craig Armstrong, Marius de Vries
2005–2006	Cha Cha; Rhumba; Samba	Carmina Burana by Carl Orff; Black Angel both performed by Edvin Marton
2004–2005	Steppin' Out with My Baby by Irving Berlin	Carmina Burana by Carl Orff performed by Edvin Marton
2003–2004	Rock 'n Roll; Blues; Rock 'n Roll	Objection (Tango) by Shakira
2002–2003	Waltz; Polka by Johann Strauss	Quidam (from Cirque du Soleil) by Benoît Jutras

== Competitive highlights ==
GP: Grand Prix; JGP: Junior Grand Prix

=== With Fejes ===
International
Event	09–10	10–11	11–12	12–13
World Championships		28th	23rd	24th
European Championships		24th	17th	16th
Crystal Skate of Romania				3rd
Finlandia Trophy	8th	8th		
Golden Spin of Zagreb	6th	WD		
Ice Challenge		5th	4th	
Nebelhorn Trophy				WD
Ondrej Nepela Memorial	7th	7th	4th	
Pavel Roman Memorial		3rd	1st	
National
Hungarian Championships	2nd	2nd	1st	1st
WD = Withdrew

=== With Elek ===
International
Event	02–03	03–04	04–05	05–06	06–07
World Champ.					26th
European Champ.				21st	20th
GP Trophée Bompard					12th
GP NHK Trophy					11th
Golden Spin				5th	
Skate Israel				5th	
International: Junior
World Junior Champ.	23rd	16th			
JGP Croatia		7th			
JGP Hungary			6th		
JGP Mexico		8th			
JGP United States			7th		
EYOF	9th				
National
Hungarian Champ.	1st J			2nd	2nd
J = Junior level

=== With Kriska ===
International
Event	00–01	02–03
JGP Canada		11th
JGP Italy		17th
JGP Ukraine	14th	
Grand Prize SNP	3rd J	
J = Junior level
