= Katherine Hadford =

Hungarian-American figure skater

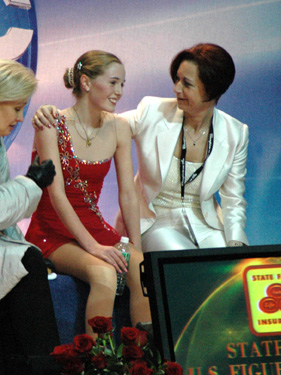
- Hadford with former coach Priscilla Hill

Personal information
- Born: July 24, 1989 (age 36) Vienna, Virginia, U.S.
- Height: 5 ft 5 in (1.66 m)

Figure skating career
- Country: Hungary (2006–2010); United States (until 2005)
- Coach: Jeranjak Ipakjan
- Skating club: Jeghegy Budapest

Katherine "Kati" Hadford (born 24 July 1989) is a Hungarian-American former competitive figure skater who skated internationally for Hungary. She is the 2008 and 2010 Hungarian national silver medalist and three time (2006, 2007, 2009) bronze medalist.

== Personal life ==
Hadford was born in Vienna, Virginia, United States in the United States. Her mother is a Hungarian citizen and her grandparents (György Szele and Kornélia Széchényi) fled Hungary in the 1950s to escape communism. She is related to István Széchenyi.

She moved to Hungary when she began representing that country in competition. She is bilingual in Hungarian and English.

== Career ==
Hadford previously skated for the United States. Hadford began representing Hungary internationally in the 2006/2007 season.

== Competitive highlights ==
=== For Hungary ===
| Event | 2005–06 | 2006–07 | 2007–08 | 2008–09 | 2009–10 | 2010–11 |
|---|---|---|---|---|---|---|
| European Championships | | | 21st | 31st | 31st | 34th |
| World Junior Championships | | 25th | 24th | | | |
| Hungarian Championships | 3rd | 3rd | 2nd | 3rd | 2nd | |
| Golden Spin of Zagreb | | 9th | | 11th | 11th | 15th |
| Crystal Skate of Romania | | | | | 14th | |
| Ondrej Nepela Memorial | | | | 10th | | |
| Karl Schäfer Memorial | | | | 12th | | |
| Junior Grand Prix, Italy | | | | 25th | | |
| Junior Grand Prix, Germany | | | 12th | | | |
| Junior Grand Prix, Austria | | | 23rd | | | |
| Junior Grand Prix, Hungary | | 10th | | | | |
| Junior Grand Prix, Czech Republic | | 18th | | | | |

=== For the United States ===
| Event | 2004–05 |
|---|---|
| U.S. Championships | 17th |
