= Zoltán Tóth (figure skater) =

Hungarian figure skater

Personal information
- Born: 24 August 1979 (age 46) Debrecen, Hungary
- Height: 1.85 m (6 ft 1 in)

Figure skating career
- Country: Hungary
- Skating club: Jegcsillag SC Budapest; Vasas SC Budapest
- Began skating: 1988
- Retired: 2006

Zoltán Tóth (born 24 August 1979) is a Hungarian former competitive figure skater. He is a five-time Hungarian national champion and competed in two Winter Olympics.

== Personal life ==
Zoltán Tóth was born on 24 August 1979 in Debrecen, Hungary.

== Career ==
Tóth began skating in 1988. Early in his career, he was coached by András Száraz. Zsófia Kulcsár became his coach in 1998.

Tóth became Hungary's senior national champion for the first time in the 2000–01 season. He represented Vasas Skating Club in Budapest. The following season, he competed at the 2002 Winter Olympics in Salt Lake City, Utah, placing 25th. His highest ISU Championship placement, 17th, came at the 2003 Europeans in Malmö, Sweden.

In the 2003–04 season, Tóth began representing Jegcsillag Skating Club in Budapest. He won silver medals at the 2003 Golden Spin of Zagreb and 2003 Crystal Skate of Romania. He placed 25th at both the 2004 European Championships in Budapest and 2004 World Championships in Dortmund.

Tóth started the 2005–06 season with a sixth-place result at the 2005 Ondrej Nepela Memorial in Bratislava, Slovakia. In October, he competed at the 2005 Karl Schäfer Memorial in Vienna – the final opportunity to qualify for the Olympics – and finished 7th, which would turn out to be sufficient. In February 2006, he competed at the Winter Olympics in Turin, Italy. He was one of 24 skaters to qualify for the free skate, having ranked 24th in the short, and finished 24th overall. It was his final competitive appearance.

Tóth is a coach at Jégvirág Miskolc Skating Club in Miskolc, Hungary.

== Programs ==
Season	Short program	Free skating
2005–2006	Kill Bill choreo. by Edvald Smirnov, István Boros	Music by Ludwig van Beethoven choreo. by Edvald Smirnov, István Boros
2004–2005	Malaguena by Raúl Di Blasio choreo. by Jerenjak Ipakjan	Music by Ludwig van Beethoven choreo. by Edvald Smirnov, István Boros
2003–2004	Piano Concerto No. 1 by Pyotr Ilyich Tchaikovsky choreo. by Jerenjak Ipakjan	Die Another Day by David Arnold choreo. by István Boros
2002–2003	Piano Concerto No. 1 by Pyotr Ilyich Tchaikovsky choreo. by Jerenjak Ipakjan	Night on Bald Mountain by Modest Mussorgsky choreo. by István Boros
2001–2002	Close Cover by Wim Mertens, Café del Mar choreo. by István Boros	Night on Bald Mountain by Modest Mussorgsky choreo. by István Boros
2000–2001	Suite for Variety Orchestra by Dmitri Shostakovich (from Eyes Wide Shut) choreo. by István Boros	Face/Off by John Powell choreo. by István Boros

== Results ==
JGP: Junior Series/Junior Grand Prix

International
Event	95–96	96–97	97–98	98–99	99–00	00–01	01–02	02–03	03–04	04–05	05–06
Olympics							25th				24th
Worlds						35th	31st	27th	25th	27th	
Europeans						25th		17th	25th	30th	26th
Crystal Skate								2nd	2nd		
Czech Skate	12th										
Golden Spin					20th	12th	18th		2nd	11th	
Karl Schäfer											7th
Nebelhorn Trophy	15th										
Ondrej Nepela						20th	10th		6th		6th
International: Junior
Junior Worlds			27th	30th							
JGP Hungary			11th	10th							
JGP Slovakia				13th							
Grand Prize SNP	5th J.										
Penta Cup	7th J.										
National
Hungarian Champ.	2nd		3rd	2nd	3rd	1st	2nd	1st	1st	1st	1st
J. = Junior level
