= Ádám Tóth =

Hungarian ice dancer (born 1985)

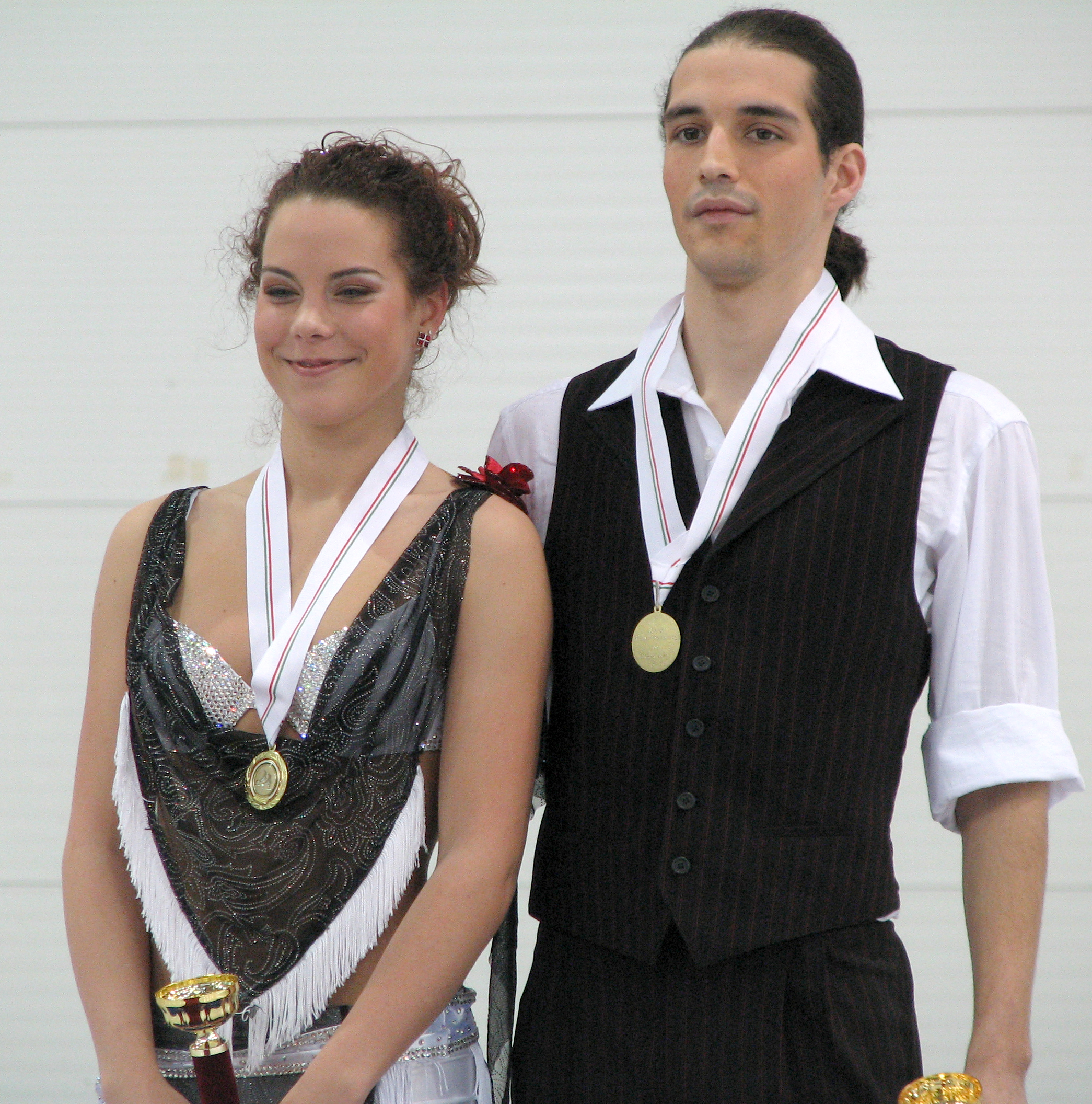
- Barta and Tóth at the 2007–2008 Hungarian Championship

Personal information
- Born: 7 July 1985 (age 41) Budapest, Hungary
- Height: 1.83 m (6 ft 0 in)

Figure skating career
- Country: Hungary
- Partner: Krisztina Barta
- Coach: Sándor Nagy, Gabriella Remport
- Skating club: Tango SC Budapest
- Began skating: 1996
- Retired: 2008

Ádám Tóth (born 7 July 1985 in Budapest) is a Hungarian former competitive ice dancer. With Krisztina Barta, he is the 2008 Hungarian national champion and competed in the final segment at three ISU Championships – the 2006 World Junior Championships in Ljubljana, Slovenia; 2007 World Junior Championships in Oberstdorf, Germany; and 2008 European Championships in Zagreb, Croatia. They also competed in the original dance at the 2008 World Championships in Gothenburg, Sweden.

== Programs ==
(with Barta)

| Season | Original dance | Free dance |
|---|---|---|
| 2007–2008 | Inka (South American folk music) | Dance with Me by Debelah Morgan; Walk Away by Christina Aguilera; Hey Baby |
| 2006–2007 | El Tango de Roxanne from Moulin Rouge! | Toccata and Fugue by Johann Sebastian Bach |
| 2005–2006 | Cha cha; Rhumba; Samba | The Four Seasons performed by Vanessa-Mae |

== Results ==
JGP: Junior Grand Prix

with Barta

International
| Event | 03–04 | 04–05 | 05–06 | 06–07 | 07–08 |
|---|---|---|---|---|---|
| World Champ. | | | | | 25th |
| European Champ. | | | | | 21st |
| Golden Spin | | | | | 13th |
| P. Roman Memorial | | | | | 5th |
International: Junior
| World Junior Champ. | | | 17th | 15th | |
| JGP Andorra | | | 9th | | |
| JGP Bulgaria | | | 9th | | |
| JGP Hungary | | 14th | | | |
| JGP Norway | | | | 9th | |
| JGP Romania | | | | 7th | |
| JGP Ukraine | | 13th | | | |
| Grand Prize SNP | | | 2nd J | | |
| P. Roman Memorial | | | 3rd J | | |
| Helena Pajovic Cup | 2nd N | | | | |
National
| Hungarian Champ. | 1st N | 4th J | | 1st J | 1st |
Levels: N = Novice; J = Junior
