= Máté Fejes =

Hungarian ice dancer (born 1988)

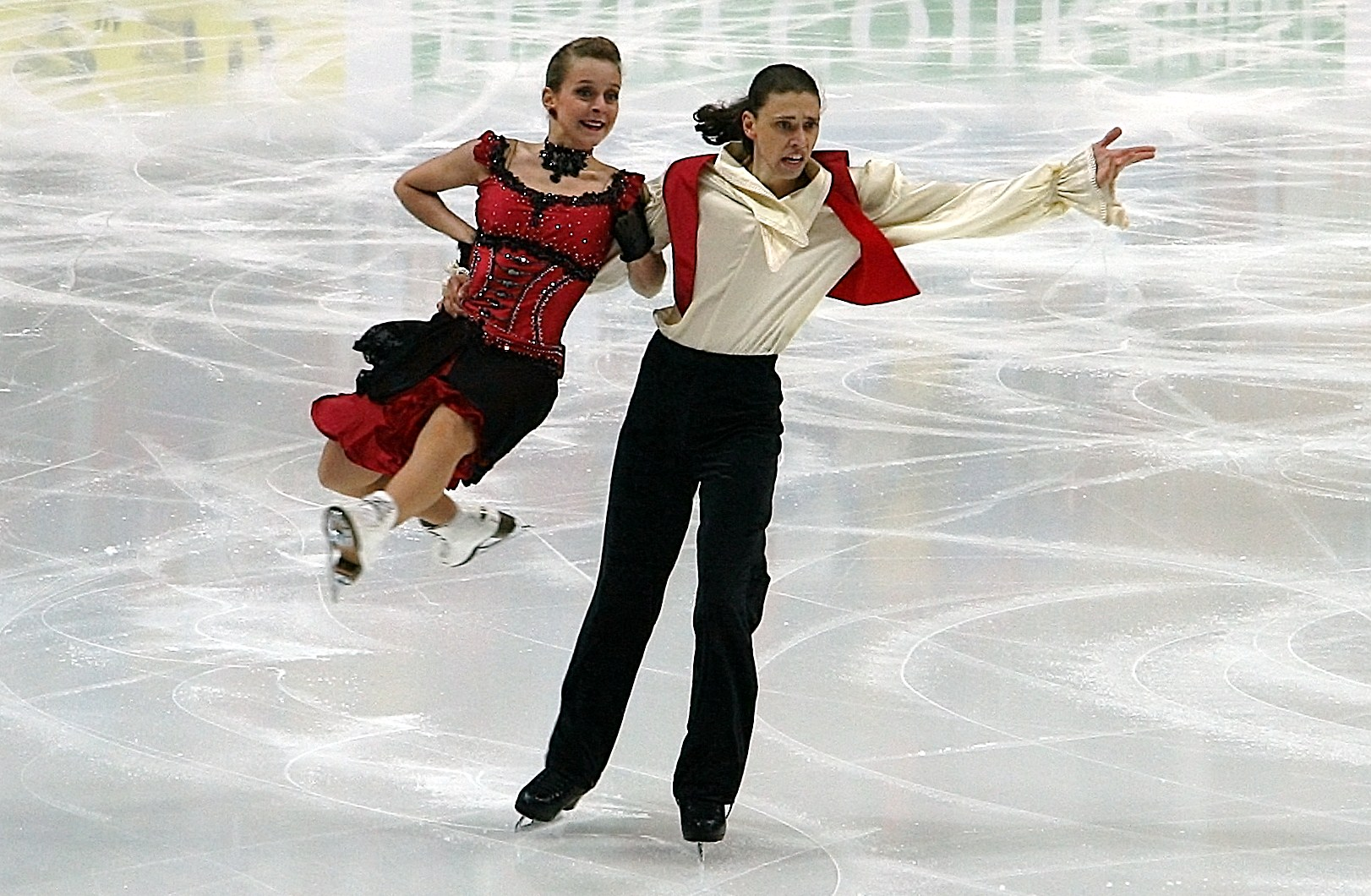
- Nagy and Fejes in 2011

Personal information
- Born: 8 February 1988 (age 38) Budapest, Hungary
- Height: 1.76 m (5 ft 9 in)

Figure skating career
- Country: Hungary
- Partner: Zsuzsanna Nagy, Dorina Molnar, Emese Laszlo
- Coach: Sandor Nagy, Elena Kustarova, Gabor Kolecsanszky, Ilona Berecz
- Skating club: BP Spartacus
- Began skating: 1996
- Retired: 2013

Máté Fejes (born 8 February 1988 in Budapest) is a Hungarian former competitive ice dancer. With Zsuzsanna Nagy, he is the 2011 Pavel Roman Memorial champion and a two-time Hungarian national champion. They competed in the final segment at two European Championships.

== Career ==
Fejes began skating with Dorina Molnar by 2003. After competing on the novice level, they moved up to the junior ranks in the 2004–2005 season. They would appear at four ISU Junior Grand Prix (JGP) events, coached by Gabor Kolecsanszky in Budapest.

Fejes began his partnership with Emese Laszlo ahead of the 2006–2007 season. They appeared at six JGP events and qualified to the free dance at the 2008 World Junior Championships, finishing 20th overall. They competed at one senior international, placing 28th at the 2009 World Championships. They were coached by Sándor Nagy and Gabriella Remport in Budapest.

Fejes began competing with Nagy later in 2009. She broke her skull bone in November 2011 while they were practicing a lift. They became two-time national champions and appeared at six ISU Championships. They competed in the final segment at the 2012 European Championships in Sheffield, England, and 2013 European Championships in Zagreb, Croatia. They competed in the short dance at the 2012 World Championships in Nice, France, and 2013 World Championships in London, Ontario. They were coached by her father, Sandor Nagy.

== Programs ==
=== With Nagy ===
Season	Short dance	Free dance
2012–2013	My Sweet And Tender Beast by Eugen Doga	Adagio for Strings by Il Divo
2011–2012	Rhumba; Samba	Minnie the Moocher (from The Blues Brothers); Why Don't You Do Right? (from Who Framed Roger Rabbit); Mr. Pinstripe Suit by Big Bad Voodoo Daddy
2010–2011	La Foule; Les Flonflons du Bal by Édith Piaf	The Barber of Seville by Gioachino Rossini
	Original dance	
2009–2010	Serbian gypsy dance	Adagio - Question of Honor

=== With Laszlo ===
Season	Original dance	Free dance
2008–2009	Minnie the Moocher; Swing, Brother, Swing	Latin combination
2007–2008	Iag Bari (Romanian gypsy dance)	Aranjuez Mon Amour by Joaquín Rodrigo

=== With Molnar ===
Season	Short dance	Free dance
2005–2006	Cha cha; Rhumba; Samba	The Phantom of the Opera by Andrew Lloyd Webber
2004–2005	Quickstep; Slow Foxtrot; Quickstep	Jungle Bill; The Rhythm Divine; Gold Rush; Pinball Cha Cha all titles by Yellow

== Competitive highlights ==
JGP: Junior Grand Prix

=== With Nagy ===
International
Event	09–10	10–11	11–12	12–13
World Championships		28th	23rd	24th
European Championships		24th	17th	16th
Crystal Skate of Romania				3rd
Finlandia Trophy	8th	8th		
Golden Spin of Zagreb	6th	WD		
Ice Challenge		5th	4th	
Nebelhorn Trophy				WD
Ondrej Nepela Memorial	7th	7th	4th	
Pavel Roman Memorial		3rd	1st	
National
Hungarian Championships	2nd	2nd	1st	1st
WD = Withdrew

=== With Laszlo ===
International
Event	2006–07	2007–08	2008–09
World Championships			28th
International: Junior
World Junior Champ.		20th	
JGP Austria		11th	
JGP Croatia		9th	
JGP Hungary	11th		
JGP Italy			10th
JGP Netherlands	14th		
JGP Spain			8th
Grand Prize SNP		2nd J	
Pavel Roman Memorial		3rd J	
Santa Claus Cup			3rd J
National
Hungarian Champ.	2nd J		
J = Junior level

=== With Molnar ===
International
Event	2003–04	2004–05	2005–06
JGP France		13th	
JGP Germany		18th	
JGP Poland			16th
JGP Slovakia			11th
Nordics			3rd J
Pavel Roman Memorial	6th N	10th J	
Helena Pajovic Cup	3rd N		
Levels: N = Novice; J = Junior
