= Jenő Ébert =

Hungarian figure skater

Personal information
- Born: 16 July 1946 (age 79) Dunakeszi, Hungary
- Height: 1.73 m (5 ft 8 in)

Figure skating career
- Country: Hungary
- Skating club: Budapesti Spartacus SC
- Retired: c. 1968

Jenő Ébert (born 16 July 1946) is a Hungarian former figure skater. He is a seven-time Hungarian national champion. He competed at the 1964 Winter Olympics in Innsbruck and at the 1968 Winter Olympics in Grenoble.

== Competitive highlights ==
International
Event	1961	1962	1963	1964	1965	1966	1967	1968
Winter Olympics				21st				19th
World Champ.			14th		19th	15th		19th
European Champ.			8th	12th	14th	13th	12th	
National
Hungarian Champ.	1st		1st	1st	1st	1st	1st	1st
