= Zsuzsa Szentmiklóssy =

Hungarian figure skater

Zsuzsa Szentmiklóssy is a Hungarian former competitive figure skater. She is the 1966 Prize of Moscow News silver medalist and a two-time Hungarian national champion, having won in 1963 and 1965. She represented her country at three World and three European Championships. Her best result, 11th, came at the 1967 European Championships in Ljubljana, Yugoslavia.

== Competitive highlights ==
International
Event	62–63	63–64	64–65	65–66	66–67
World Championships	21st		18th		21st
European Champ.	16th		12th		11th
Prague Skate				6th	
Prize of Moscow News					2nd
National
Hungarian Champ.	1st		1st		
