= Krisztina Barta =

Hungarian ice dancer (born 1991)

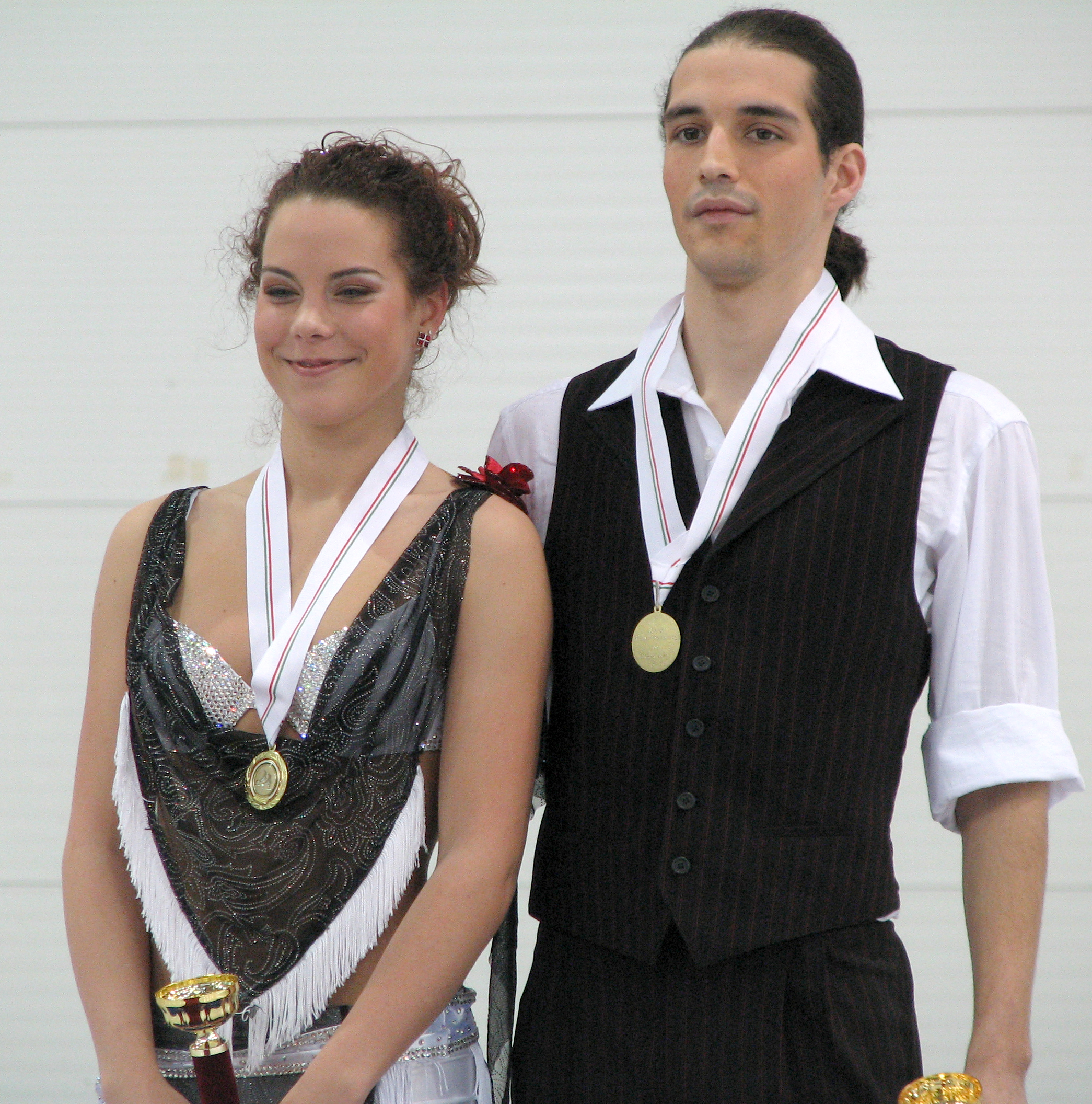
- Barta and Tóth at the 2007–2008 Hungarian Championship

Personal information
- Born: 9 May 1991 (age 35) Budapest, Hungary
- Height: 1.69 m (5 ft 7 in)

Figure skating career
- Country: Hungary
- Partner: Ádám Tóth
- Coach: Sándor Nagy, Gabriella Remport
- Skating club: Tango SC Budapest
- Began skating: 1996
- Retired: 2008

Krisztina Barta (born 9 May 1991 in Budapest) is a Hungarian former competitive ice dancer. With Ádám Tóth, she is the 2008 Hungarian national champion and competed in the final segment at three ISU Championships – the 2006 World Junior Championships in Ljubljana, Slovenia; 2007 World Junior Championships in Oberstdorf, Germany; and 2008 European Championships in Zagreb, Croatia. They also competed in the original dance at the 2008 World Championships in Gothenburg, Sweden.

== Programs ==
(with Tóth)

Season	Original dance	Free dance
2007–2008	Inka (South American folk music)	Dance with Me by Debelah Morgan; Walk Away by Christina Aguilera; Hey Baby
2006–2007	El Tango de Roxanne from Moulin Rouge!	Toccata and Fugue by Johann Sebastian Bach
2005–2006	Cha cha; Rhumba; Samba	The Four Seasons performed by Vanessa-Mae

== Results ==
JGP: Junior Grand Prix

with Tóth

International
Event	04–05	05–06	06–07	07–08
World Champ.				25th
European Champ.				21st
Golden Spin				13th
P. Roman Memorial				5th
International: Junior
World Junior Champ.		17th	15th	
JGP Andorra		9th		
JGP Bulgaria		9th		
JGP Hungary	14th			
JGP Norway			9th	
JGP Romania			7th	
JGP Ukraine	13th			
Grand Prize SNP		2nd J		
P. Roman Memorial		3rd J		
National
Hungarian Champ.	4th J		1st J	1st
J = Junior
