= Krisztina Czakó =

Hungarian figure skater

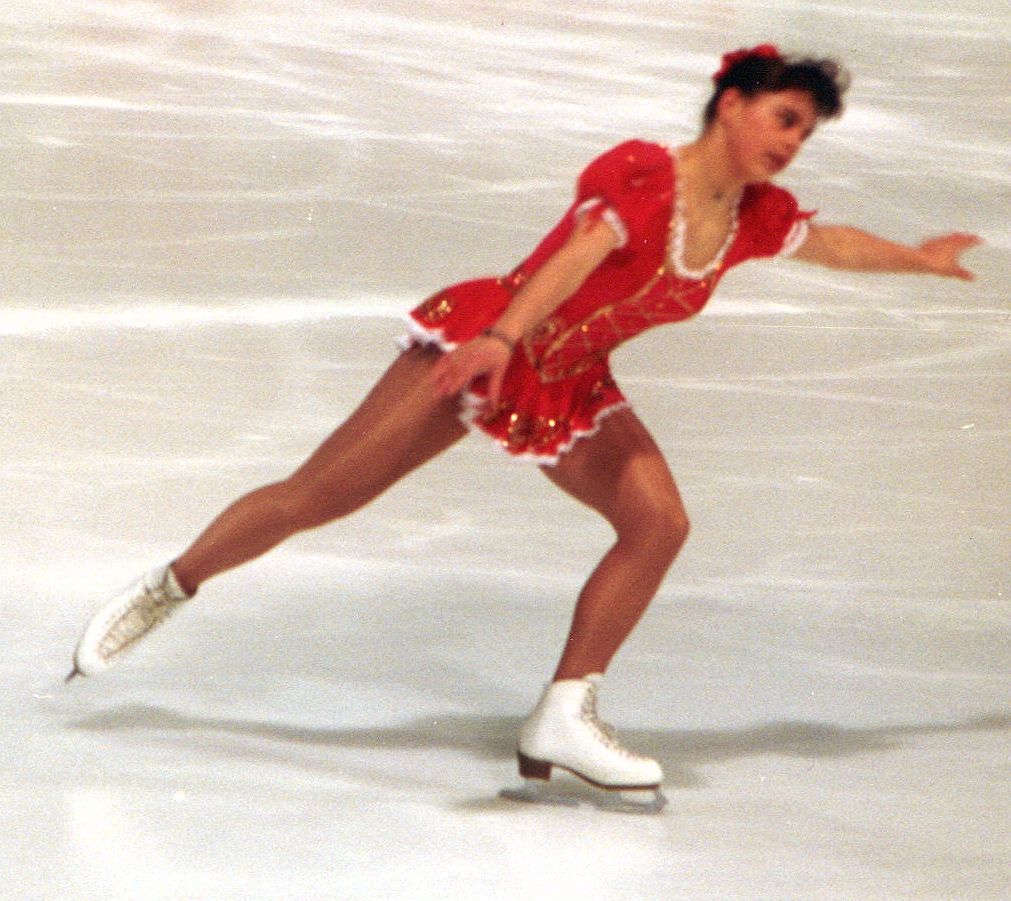
- Czakó at the Europeans 1994 in Copenhagen

Personal information
- Born: 17 December 1978 (age 47) Budapest, Hungary

Figure skating career
- Country: Hungary
- Coach: György Czakó
- Retired: 1999
Medal record
Representing Hungary
Ladies' Figure skating
European Championships
Silver medal – second place	1997 Paris	Ladies' singles
World Junior Championships
Bronze medal – third place	1995 Budapest	Ladies' singles
Silver medal – second place	1994 Colorado Springs	Ladies' singles

Krisztina Czakó (born 17 December 1978) is a Hungarian former figure skater. She is the 1997 European silver medalist and 1994 Skate Canada International champion.

== Career ==
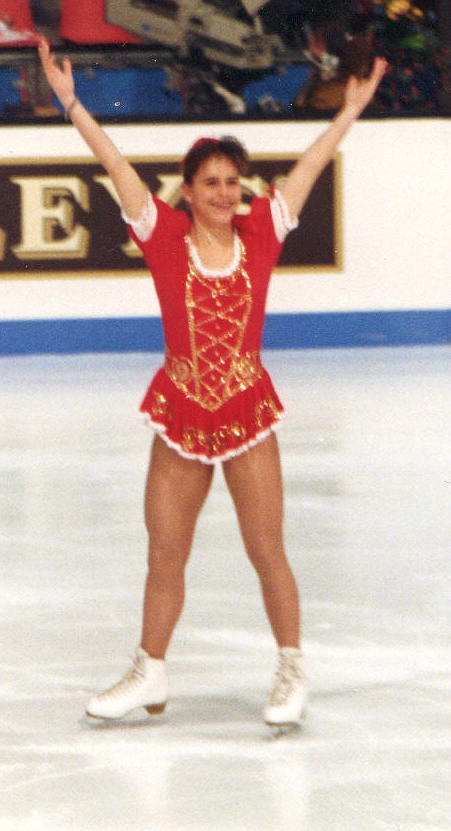
Krisztina Czakó at the Europeans 1994 in Copenhagen

Czakó was born in Budapest, Hungary. Her mother Klara was a speed skater, while her father and coach György Czakó was a former Hungarian men's national champion in figure skating. György began teaching Krisztina how to skate before she was a year old, making her a pair of skates himself when none could be found that were small enough to fit her.

Czakó was the youngest athlete to compete in the 1992 Winter Olympics, at age 13 years and 2 months. She was so young that she was still able to compete in the World Junior Championship in 1994 and 1995 (finishing second and third, respectively), despite her Olympic experience. She made her second Olympic appearance in Lillehammer, Norway, in 1994, finishing 11th. She intended to compete in her third Olympics in 1998 but had to withdraw due to injury.

Czakó won the silver medal at the 1997 European Championships skating her long program to the music of The Addams Family. It was the first medal for Hungary in the European ladies' event since 1971. Czakó also achieved a career-best 7th-place finish at the 1997 World Championships.

Czakó was a seven-time Hungarian national champion (1992-1998) and represented her country in two Olympics, six World Championships, and seven European championships, along with numerous other competitions. She was the first Hungarian woman to land a triple-triple combination in competition. She is now retired from competitive skating.

== Results ==
GP: Champions Series (Grand Prix)

International
Event	91–92	92–93	93–94	94–95	95–96	96–97	97–98	98-99	99–00
Winter Olympics	23rd		11th				WD		
World Champ.	17th	15th	12th	23rd	11th	7th			
European Champ.	16th	6th	6th	8th	6th	2nd	5th		
GP Cup of Russia					6th				
GP Nations Cup						5th			
GP Skate Canada			4th	1st	7th				
GP Trophée de France / Lalique				7th	6th	5th	5th		
Finlandia Trophy						3rd			
Schäfer Memorial		8th	1st	2nd	1st	8th			2nd
Nepela Memorial					1st				
Winter Universiade								8th	
International: Junior
Junior Worlds	25th	7th	2nd	3rd					
EYOF				3rd J					
National
Hungarian Champ.	1st	1st	1st	1st	1st	1st	1st		
J = Junior level; WD = Withdrew
