= Helga Zöllner =

Hungarian figure skater

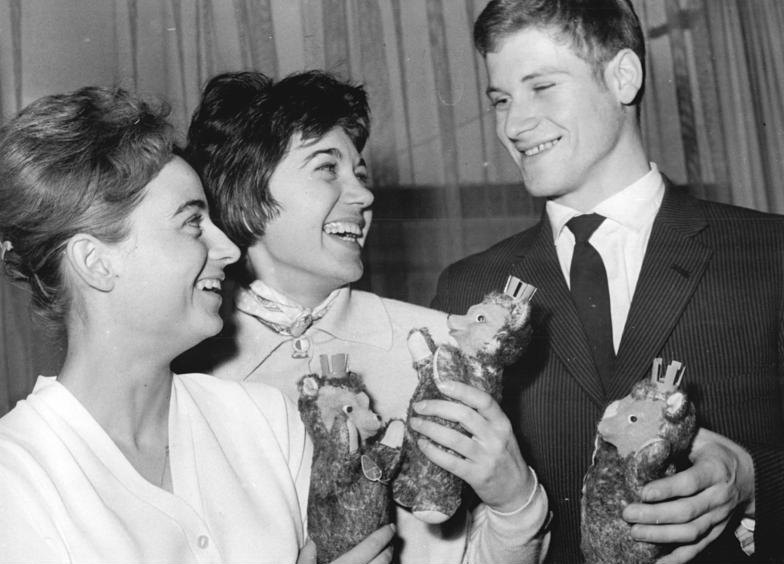
- Zöllner (center) in 1961

Personal information
- Born: 11 May 1941
- Died: 10 September 1983 (aged 42)

Figure skating career
- Country: Hungary
- Skating club: Ferencvárosi Torna Club
- Retired: c. 1962
Medal record
Representing Hungary
Ladies singles Figure skating
Winter Universiade
Bronze medal – third place	1960 Chamonix	Ladies' singles
Bronze medal – third place	1962 Villars	Ladies' singles

Helga Zöllner (11 May 1941 — 10 September 1983) was a Hungarian figure skater. She was a two-time (1960, 1962) Winter Universiade bronze medalist and a six-time (1957–62) Hungarian national champion. She placed 13th at the 1962 European Championships in Geneva and 19th at the 1962 World Championships in Prague.

== Competitive highlights ==
International
Event	1957	1958	1959	1960	1961	1962
World Champ.						19th
European Champ.	18th	19th	20th	18th	18th	13th
Winter Universiade				3rd		3rd
National
Hungarian Champ.	1st	1st	1st	1st	1st	1st
