= Edit Mató =

Hungarian ice dancer (1947–2020)

Personal information
- Born: 4 February 1947 Budapest, Hungary
- Died: February 22, 2020 (aged 73)

Figure skating career
- Country: Hungary
- Partner: Károly Csanádi
- Began skating: 1959
- Retired: 1969

Edit Mató (4 February 1947 – 22 February 2020) was a Hungarian ice dancer. With Károly Csanádi, she was the 1966 Winter Universiade champion and a four-time Hungarian national champion. The duo competed at three World Championships and five European Championships. They placed within the European top ten in 1966 (Bratislava, Czechoslovakia), 1967 (Ljubljana, Yugoslavia), and 1968 (Västerås, Sweden).

Mató was the mother of Hungarian speed skater Krisztina Egyed.

== Competitive highlights ==
With Csanádi

International
Event	64–65	65–66	66–67	67–68	68–69
World Championships		15th	14th	11th	
European Championships	12th	8th	9th	8th	12th
Prague Skate	8th		9th		
Winter Universiade		1st			
National
Hungarian Championships		1st	1st	1st	1st
