= Bertalan Zákány =

Hungarian figure skater

Bertalan Zakany
Personal information
- Born: 19 January 1984 (age 42)
- Height: 181 cm (5 ft 11 in)

Figure skating career
- Country: Hungary
- Skating club: Tiszaujvarosi Sport Club
- Retired: 2006

Bertalan Zakany (born 19 January 1984 in Miskolc, Hungary) is a Hungarian figure skater. He is the 2002 Hungarian national champion. His highest placement at an ISU Championship was 26th at the 2002 World Junior Figure Skating Championships. He has also competed at the European Figure Skating Championships and the World Figure Skating Championships. He currently plays Pinocchio in Pinocchio On Ice.

== Results ==
Event	2000	2001	2002	2003	2004	2005	2006
World Championships							34th
European Championships			28th				
Hungarian Championships	2nd	3rd	1st	2nd	2nd		2nd
