= Eszter Jurek =

Hungarian figure skater

Personal information
- Born: November 24, 1936 (age 89)

Figure skating career
- Country: Hungary

Eszter Jurek (born November 24, 1936, in Budapest) is a Hungarian former Olympic figure skater and current coach. She is a three-time (1954–1956) Hungarian champion in singles. She also competed in pairs with Miklós Kucharovits. After her competitive career, she became a coach alongside fellow skater and men's national champion András Száraz. One of her most notable former pupils was fellow Hungarian and 2004 European champion Júlia Sebestyén.

== Results ==
Event	1952	1953	1954	1955	1956	1957	1958
Winter Olympics	23rd						
World Championships		18th					
European Championships	22nd	17th		15th		11th	WD
Hungarian Championships			1st	1st	1st		
