= Mária Saáry =

Hungarian figure skater (1928–1999)

Personal information
- Nationality: Hungarian
- Born: 17 March 1928 Budapest, Hungary
- Died: 21 September 1999 (aged 71) Vienna, Austria

Sport
- Sport: Figure skating

Mária Saáry (17 March 1928 – 21 September 1999) was a Hungarian figure skater. She competed in the ladies' singles event at the 1948 Winter Olympics. Saáry died in Vienna on 21 September 1999, at the age of 71.
