= Éva Saáry =

Hungarian geologist, poet, and writer (1929–2014)

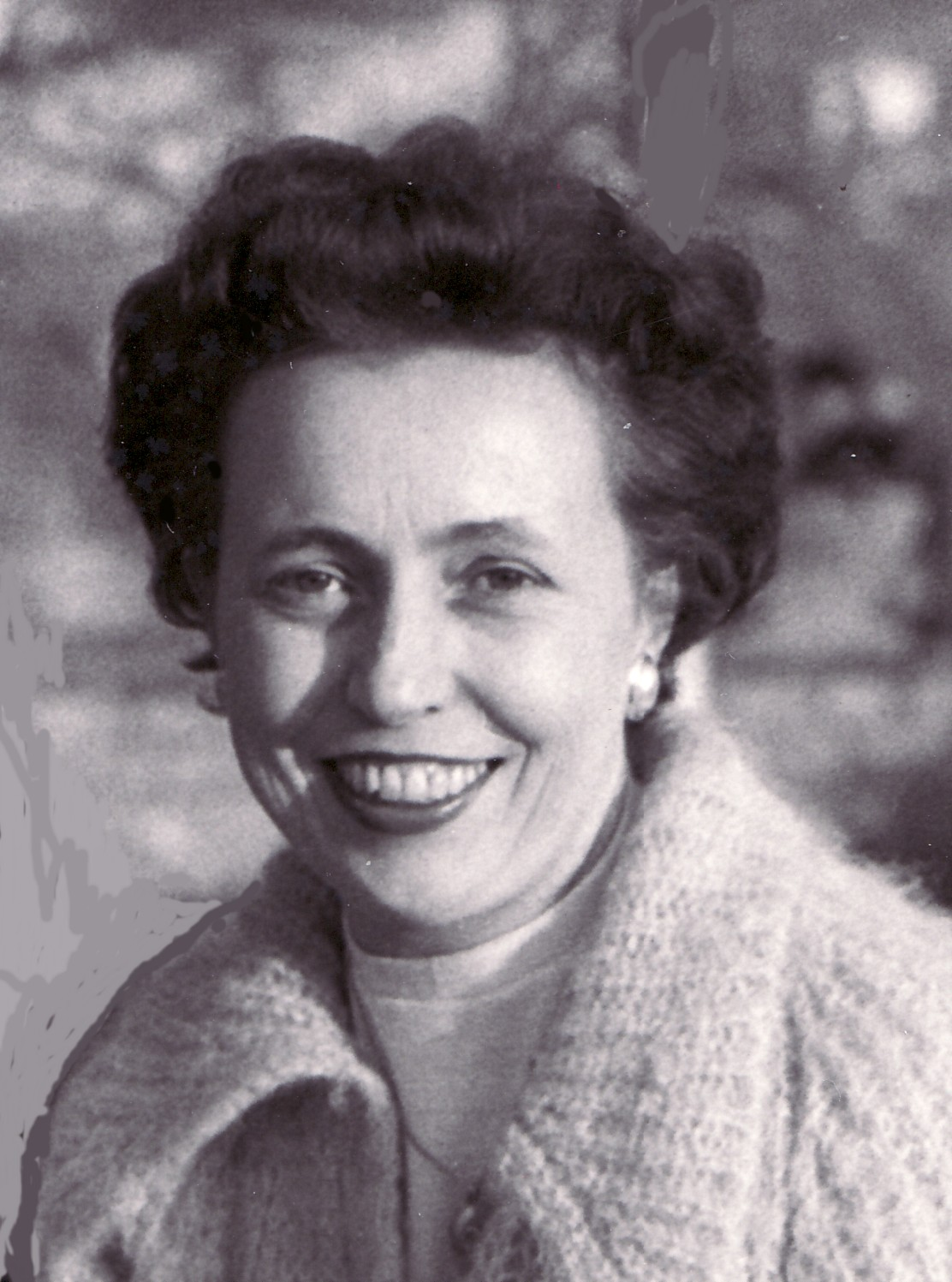
Image of Saáry Éva

Éva Larroudé-Saáry (28 November 1929, in Balatonkenese – 26 September 2014, in Lugano) was a Hungarian geologist, poet, and writer, best remembered for having authored or edited more than 30 literary works between 1973 and 2011. A graduate of the Eötvös Loránd University, she received the Hungarian Order of Merit in 1994.
