= András Száraz =

Hungarian figure skater and coach

Personal information
- Born: 2 March 1966 (age 60)

Figure skating career
- Country: Hungary

András Száraz (born 2 March 1966 in Budapest) is a Hungarian former figure skater and current coach. He is an eight-time (1982-84 & 1986–90) Hungarian champion in singles.

After his competitive career, he became a coach alongside fellow skater and ladies' national champion Eszter Jurek. His most notable skater was fellow Hungarian and 2004 European champion Júlia Sebestyén.

== Results ==
International
Event	81–82	82–83	83–84	84–85	85–86	86–87	87–88	88–89	89–90
Worlds			21st		26th		20th	15th	17th
Europeans	21st	20th	18th		17th	19th	13th	11th	22nd
Prague Skate				6th		5th			
Schäfer Memorial						3rd			
National
Hungary	1st	1st	1st		1st	1st	1st	1st	1st
