= Tamara Téglássy =

Hungarian figure skater

Personal information
- Born: 29 September 1968 (age 57) Debrecen, Hungary

Figure skating career
- Country: Hungary
- Retired: c. 1991

Tamara Téglássy (born 29 September 1968 in Debrecen) is a Hungarian former competitive figure skater. She is an eight-time Hungarian national champion (1984–1991) and competed at the 1988 Winter Olympics in Calgary. She finished in the top ten at four European Championships. Her best world result, 11th, came at the 1988 and 1990 World Championships. She was a member of the Budapest Spartacus Sport Club.

== Results ==
International
Event	83–84	84–85	85–86	86–87	87–88	88–89	89–90	90–91
Winter Olympics					19th			
World Champ.	21st	20th	18th	WD	11th	14th	11th	23rd
European Champ.	18th	15th	14th	7th	8th	9th	8th	WD
Skate America				9th				
Skate Canada						8th		
Internat. de Paris						8th		
Moscow News			10th					
NHK Trophy		9th		7th	6th	10th	9th	12th
Prague Skate		7th						
Schäfer Memorial				1st		3rd		
National
Hungarian Champ.	1st	1st	1st	1st	1st	1st	1st	1st
WD = Withdrew
