= Sándor Nagy (figure skater) =

Hungarian ice dancer

Figure skating career
- Country: Hungary
- Partner: Gabriella Remport
- Coach: Ilona Berecz
- Retired: 1980s

Sándor Nagy is a Hungarian former ice dancer. With Gabriella Remport, he is a two-time Hungarian national champion. The duo competed at three World Championships and four European Championships. They were coached by Ilona Berecz.

Nagy works as a skating coach in Budapest. His former students include ice dance couples Zsuzsanna Nagy and György Elek, Emese László and Máté Fejes, and Krisztina Barta and Ádám Tóth.

Nagy married his ice dance partner Gabriella Remport. They are the parents of Hungarian ice dancer Zsuzsanna Nagy (born 10 June 1986 in Budapest).

== Competitive highlights ==
With Remport

International
Event	1978–79	1979–80	1980–81	1983–84
World Championships	18th	16th	17th	
European Championships	16th	12th	12th	15th
NHK Trophy			5th	
National
Hungarian Championships			1st	1st
