= Éva Botond =

Hungarian figure skater (1921–1976)

Personal information
- Nationality: Hungarian
- Born: 27 May 1921; Budapest, Hungary
- Died: 30 December 1976 (aged 55); Budapest, Hungary

Sport
- Sport: Figure skating

Éva Botond (27 May 1921 – 30 December 1976) was a Hungarian figure skater. She competed in the ladies' singles event at the 1936 Winter Olympics.
