= Szabolcs Vidrai =

Hungarian figure skater

Personal information
- Born: 26 March 1977 (age 49) Budapest, Hungary
- Height: 1.80 m (5 ft 11 in)

Figure skating career
- Country: Hungary
- Skating club: MAC Nepstadion
- Began skating: 1985
- Retired: 2001

Szabolcs Vidrai (born 26 March 1977) is a Hungarian former competitive figure skater. His highest placement at the European Championships was 10th, in 1996, and his highest placement at the World Championships was 10th, in 1998. He placed 13th at the 1998 Olympics.

After retiring from competition, Vidrai began working as a coach. His former and current students include Viktória Pavuk, Fanni Forgo, and Kristof Forgo (Hungarian junior national champions).

== Programs ==
Season	Short program	Free skating
1999–2000		Black Machine by Jazz Machine

== Results ==
GP: Champions Series/Grand Prix

International
Event	91–92	92–93	93–94	94–95	95–96	96–97	97–98	98–99	99–00	00–01
Olympics							13th			
Worlds		31st			18th	16th	10th	20th	26th	
Europeans		20th		14th	10th	WD	17th	14th	11th	
GP Cup of Russia						11th	5th	5th	9th	
GP Lalique										10th
GP NHK Trophy					9th					
GP Skate America									12th	
GP Skate Canada					11th			3rd		10th
Czech Skate		17th		6th						
Finlandia Trophy						2nd	10th			9th
Golden Spin						2nd	3rd			
Nebelhorn Trophy			18th	18th						
Nepela Memorial					2nd					
Orex Cup					1st					
Penta Cup		3rd	3rd							
Piruetten			16th							
Schäfer Memorial		16th	10th	4th	7th	1st				
Skate Israel								3rd	3rd	
Sofia Cup			8th							
International
Junior Worlds	23rd	23rd		7th	4th					
EYOF				1st						
National
Hungarian Champ.		1st			1st	1st	1st	1st	1st	2nd
