= Gabriella Remport =

Hungarian ice dancer

Personal information
- Other names: Gabriella Remport Nagy

Figure skating career
- Country: Hungary
- Partner: Sándor Nagy
- Coach: Ilona Berecz
- Retired: 1980s

Gabriella Remport Nagy is a Hungarian former ice dancer. With Sándor Nagy, she is a two-time Hungarian national champion. The duo competed at three World Championships and four European Championships. They were coached by Ilona Berecz.

Remport works as a skating coach and choreographer in Budapest. Her former students include Zsuzsanna Nagy / György Elek, Emese László / Máté Fejes, and Krisztina Barta / Ádám Tóth. She is based at Twiczle Korcsolyázó Egyesület.

Remport and Nagy married each other. They are the parents of Hungarian ice dancer Zsuzsanna Nagy (born 10 June 1986 in Budapest).

== Competitive highlights ==
With Sándor Nagy

International
Event	1978–79	1979–80	1980–81	1983–84
World Championships	18th	16th	17th	
European Championships	16th	12th	12th	15th
NHK Trophy			5th	
National
Hungarian Championships			1st	1st
