= 1929 U.S. Figure Skating Championships =

Figure skating competition

- Type: National championships
- Date: February 18 – 19
- Season: 1928–29
- Location: New York, New York
- Host: Skating Club of New York
- Venue: Madison Square Garden

Champions
- Men's singles: Roger F. Turner (Senior) & George E. B. Hill (Junior)
- Women's singles: Maribel Vinson (Senior) & Evelyn Mapes (Junior)
- Pairs: Maribel Vinson and Thornton Coolidge (Senior) & Dorothy Weld and Richard L. Hapgood (Junior)
- Ice dance: Edith Secord and Joseph K. Savage
- Previous: 1928 U.S. Championships
- Next: 1930 U.S. Championships

The 1929 U.S. Figure Skating Championships were held from February 18-19 at Madison Square Garden in New York City. Gold, silver, and bronze medals were awarded in men's singles and women's singles at the senior, junior, and novice levels, pair skating at the senior and junior levels, and ice dance at the senior level. This was the first year ice dancing was present at the U.S. Championships.

== Senior results ==
=== Men's singles ===
Men's results
Rank	Skater
1st place, gold medalist(s)	Roger F. Turner
2nd place, silver medalist(s)	Frederick Goodridge
3rd place, bronze medalist(s)	J. Lester Madden
4	Walter Langer

=== Women's singles ===
Women's results
Rank	Skater
1st place, gold medalist(s)	Maribel Vinson
2nd place, silver medalist(s)	Edith Secord
3rd place, bronze medalist(s)	Suzanne Davis

=== Pairs ===
Pairs' results
Rank	Team
1st place, gold medalist(s)	Maribel Vinson; Thornton Coolidge
2nd place, silver medalist(s)	Theresa Weld Blanchard; Nathaniel William Niles
3rd place, bronze medalist(s)	Edith Secord; Joseph K. Savage
4	Ada Bauman; George Braakman

=== Ice dance ===
Ice dance results
Rank	Team
1st place, gold medalist(s)	Edith Secord; Joseph K. Savage
2nd place, silver medalist(s)	Theresa Weld Blanchard; Nathaniel William Niles
3rd place, bronze medalist(s)	Maribel Vinson; J. Lester Madden
4	Gertrude Meredith; Harold Hartshorne
5	Dorothy Weld; Richard L. Hapgood
6	Mrs. Channing Frothingham; Roger F. Turner

== Junior results ==
=== Men's singles ===
Men's results
Rank	Skater
1st place, gold medalist(s)	George E. B. Hill
2nd place, silver medalist(s)	Joseph K. Savage
3rd place, bronze medalist(s)	William Nagle
4	Robert Reed

=== Women's singles ===
Women's results
Rank	Skater
1st place, gold medalist(s)	Evelyn Mapes
2nd place, silver medalist(s)	Hulda Berger
3rd place, bronze medalist(s)	Grace Madden
4	Dorothea Sanders
5	Charlotte Hopkins
6	Annabelle Boyrer

=== Pairs ===
Pairs' results
Rank	Team
1st place, gold medalist(s)	Dorothy Weld; Richard L. Hapgood
2nd place, silver medalist(s)	Ethel Bijur; Bedell Harned
