= Skate Canada Hall of Fame =

Coordinates: 45.45445°N 75.5895°W

- Native name: Canadian Figure Skating Hall of Fame (former)
- Description: Sports hall of fame recognizing individuals who have made outstanding contributions to figure skating in Canada
- Country: Canada
- Presented by: Skate Canada

The Skate Canada Hall of Fame is the sports hall of fame for figure skating maintained by Skate Canada. It was established in 1990 as the Canadian Figure Skating Hall of Fame. The members are inducted into one of four categories that best represents the inductee's contributions to skating in Canada: athletes, coaches, builders, and officials. There is no physical home for the Hall of Fame; the offices of Skate Canada house historical artifacts and information about its honoured members.

== Members ==
| Name | Year inducted | Category |
|---|---|---|
| Constance Wilson-Samuel | 1990 | Athlete |
| Montgomery (Bud) Wilson | 1990 | Athlete |
| Melville (Mev) Rogers | 1990 | Builder |
| Louis Rubenstein | 1990 | Builder |
| Otto Gold | 1990 | Coach |
| Barbara Ann Scott | 1991 | Athlete |
| Cecil Smith Hedstrom | 1991 | Athlete |
| George Blundun | 1991 | Builder |
| Sheldon Galbraith | 1991 | Coach |
| Donald Cruikshank | 1991 | Official |
| Suzanne (Morrow) Francis | 1992 | Athlete |
| Wallace Distelmeyer | 1992 | Athlete |
| Donald Jackson | 1992 | Athlete |
| Granville Mayall | 1992 | Builder |
| Ellen Burka | 1992 | Coach |
| Dr. Sidney Soanes | 1992 | Official |
| Frances Dafoe | 1993 | Athlete |
| Norris Bowden | 1993 | Athlete |
| Barbara Wagner | 1993 | Athlete |
| Robert Paul | 1993 | Athlete |
| Charles Cumming | 1993 | Builder |
| Gustave Lussi | 1993 | Coach |
| Nigel Stephens | 1993 | Official |
| Maria Jelinek | 1994 | Athlete |
| Otto Jelinek | 1994 | Athlete |
| Ralph McCreath | 1994 | Athlete |
| Peter Munford | 1994 | Builder |
| Margaret Hyland | 1994 | Coach |
| Bruce Hyland | 1994 | Coach |
| Norman Gregory | 1994 | Official |
| Donald McPherson | 1995 | Athlete |
| Mary Rose Thacker | 1995 | Athlete |
| Elizabeth Swan | 1995 | Builder |
| Osborne Colson | 1995 | Coach |
| Isabelle Henderson | 1995 | Official |
| Geraldine Fenton | 1996 | Athlete |
| William McLachlan | 1996 | Athlete |
| Virginia Thompson | 1996 | Athlete |
| Karen Magnussen | 1996 | Athlete |
| Billie Mitchell | 1996 | Builder |
| Linda Brauckmann | 1996 | Coach |
| Donald Gilchrist | 1996 | Official |
| Petra Burka | 1997 | Athlete |
| Toller Cranston | 1997 | Athlete |
| Brian Orser | 1997 | Athlete |
| Barbara Underhill | 1997 | Athlete |
| Paul Martini | 1997 | Athlete |
| Johnny Esaw | 1997 | Builder |
| John McKay | 1997 | Builder |
| Doug Leigh | 1997 | Coach |
| Jean Westwood | 1997 | Coach |
| Joyce Hisey | 1997 | Official |
| Joan Maclagan | 1997 | Official |
| Gordon Garden | 1999 | Official |
| Isabelle Brasseur | 2000 | Athlete |
| Lloyd Eisler | 2000 | Athlete |
| Kurt Browning | 2000 | Athlete |
| Tom Collins | 2000 | Builder |
| Elizabeth Manley | 2001 | Athlete |
| Debbi Wilkes | 2001 | Athlete |
| Guy Revell | 2001 | Athlete |
| F. K. J. (Joe) Geisler | 2001 | Builder |
| Sonya Dunfield | 2001 | Coach |
| Peter Dunfield | 2001 | Coach |
| Tracy Wilson | 2003 | Athlete |
| Robert McCall | 2003 | Athlete |
| Barbara Graham | 2003 | Builder |
| Michael Jiranek | 2003 | Builder |
| Elvis Stojko | 2004 | Athlete |
| Dr. Charles Snelling | 2005 | Athlete |
| Louis Stong | 2005 | Builder |
| David Pelletier | 2006 | Athlete |
| Jamie Salé | 2006 | Athlete |
| Dennis Silverthorne | 2006 | Builder |
| Shae-Lynn Bourne | 2007 | Athlete |
| Victor Kraatz | 2007 | Athlete |
| Bernard Ford | 2007 | Builder |
| Donald Knight | 2008 | Athlete |
| David Dore | 2008 | Builder |
| George Gross | 2008 | Builder |
| Jim Proudfoot | 2008 | Builder |
| Marijane Stong | 2008 | Professional |
| Wendy Griner | 2010 | Athlete |
| George Meagher | 2010 | Athlete |
| Bill Dowding | 2010 | Builder |
| Wilf Langevin | 2010 | Builder |
| William Ostapchuk | 2010 | Builder |
| Ann Shaw | 2010 | Builder |
| Sandra Bezic | 2010 | Professional |
| Dr. Hellmut May | 2010 | Professional |
| Jeffrey Buttle | 2012 | Athlete |
| Brian Pockar | 2012 | Athlete |
| John Knebli | 2012 | Builder |
| Norman Scott | 2012 | Builder |
| Kerry Leitch | 2012 | Professional |
| Lori Nichol | 2012 | Professional |
| 2009 NEXXICE Synchronized Skating Team | 2015 | Athletes |
| Louise Bertram/Stewart Reburn | 2015 | Athletes |
| Cathy Dalton | 2015 | Builder |
| Richard Gauthier | 2015 | Coach |
| Sarah Kawahara | 2015 | Professional |
| Marie-France Dubreuil | 2017 | Athlete |
| Patrice Lauzon | 2017 | Athlete |
| Jennifer Robinson | 2017 | Athlete |
| Steve Milton | 2017 | Builder |
| Ron Vincent | 2017 | Builder |
| Eric Gillies | 2017 | Professional |
| Josée Picard | 2017 | Professional |
| Lee Barkell | 2019 | Professional |
| Anne Schelter | | |
