= 1928 U.S. Figure Skating Championships =

Figure skating competition

- Type: National championships
- Date: March 26 – 27
- Season: 1927–28
- Location: Boston, Massachusetts

Champions
- Men's singles: Roger F. Turner (Senior) & J. Lester Madden (Junior)
- Women's singles: Maribel Vinson (Senior) & Virginia Badger (Junior)
- Pairs: Maribel Vinson and Thornton Coolidge (Senior) & Grace Madden and J. Lester Madden (Junior)
- Previous: 1927 U.S. Championships
- Next: 1929 U.S. Championships

The 1928 U.S. Figure Skating Championships were held from March 26-27 in Boston, Massachusetts. Gold, silver, and bronze medals were awarded in men's singles and women's singles at the senior, junior, and novice levels and in pair skating at the senior and junior levels

== Senior results ==
=== Men's singles ===
Men's results
Rank	Skater
1st place, gold medalist(s)	Roger F. Turner
2nd place, silver medalist(s)	Frederick Goodridge
3rd place, bronze medalist(s)	Walter Langer
4	Ferrier T. Martin

=== Women's singles ===
Women's results
Rank	Skater
1st place, gold medalist(s)	Maribel Vinson
2nd place, silver medalist(s)	Suzanne Davis

=== Pairs ===
Pairs' results
Rank	Team
1st place, gold medalist(s)	Maribel Vinson; Thornton Coolidge
2nd place, silver medalist(s)	Theresa Weld Blanchard; Nathaniel W. Niles
3rd place, bronze medalist(s)	Ada Bauman; George Braakman

== Junior results ==
=== Men's singles ===
Men's results
Rank	Skater
1st place, gold medalist(s)	J. Lester Madden
2nd place, silver medalist(s)	George E. B. Hill
3rd place, bronze medalist(s)	Roy Shipstad
4	Joseph K. Savage
5	Heaton R. Robertson
6	Thornton Coolidge
7	Richard L. Hapgood
8	William Nagle
9	Edmond Brigham
10	Robert Rothman
11	Charles Wyman
12	L. Shepherd

=== Women's singles ===
Women's results
Rank	Skater
1st place, gold medalist(s)	Virginia Badger
2nd place, silver medalist(s)	Hulda Berger
3rd place, bronze medalist(s)	Evelyn Chandler
4	Grace Madden
5	Margaret Bennett
6	Gertrude Meredith
7	Annabelle Boyrer
8	Charlotte Hopkins
9	Dorothea Sanders

=== Pairs ===
Pairs' results
Rank	Team
1st place, gold medalist(s)	Grace Madden; J. Lester Madden
2nd place, silver medalist(s)	Dorothy Weld; Richard L. Hapgood
3rd place, bronze medalist(s)	Ethel Bijur; Bedell Harned
