= Veronica Clarke =

Canadian figure skater

Personal information
- Full name: Veronica Clarke
- Born: 17 May 1912
- Died: 29 July 1999 (aged 87)

Figure skating career
- Country: Canada
- Skating club: Toronto SC
- Retired: 1938
Medal record
Representing Canada
Ladies' Figure skating
North American Championships
Silver medal – second place	1937 Boston	Ladies' singles
Pairs' Figure skating
North American Championships
Gold medal – first place	1937 Boston	Pairs

Veronica Clarke (May 17, 1912 - July 27, 1999) was a Canadian figure skater who competed in single skating, pair skating, and four skating. She competed in pairs with Ralph McCreath, winning the North American title in 1937, and three national titles in 1936-1938. In fours, she was the 1938 national fours champion with Constance Wilson-Samuel, Montgomery Wilson, and Ralph McCreath.

== Results ==
=== Singles career ===
Event	1931	1932	1933	1934	1935	1936	1937
North American Championships							2nd
Canadian Championships		2nd	3rd	2nd	2nd	2nd	3rd
Canadian Junior Championships	2nd	1st					

=== Pairs career ===
(with Ralph McCreath)

Event	1936	1937	1938
North American Championships		1st	
Canadian Championships	1st	1st	1st

=== Fours career ===
(with Constance Wilson-Samuel, Montgomery Wilson, and Ralph McCreath)

Event	1938
Canadian Championships	1st
