= 1930 World Figure Skating Championships =

Annual figure skating competition held in 1930

- Type: ISU Championship
- Date: February 3 – 5
- Season: 1930
- Location: New York City, New York United States

Champions
- Men's singles: (Austria) Karl Schäfer
- Ladies' singles: (Norway) Sonja Henie
- Pairs: (France) Andrée Brunet / Pierre Brunet
- Previous: 1929 World Championships
- Next: 1931 World Championships

The World Figure Skating Championships is an annual figure skating competition sanctioned by the International Skating Union in which figure skaters compete for the title of World Champion.

The competitions took place from February 3 to 5 in New York City, the first figure skating world championships in the United States. It was also the first year when all competitions were held at the same location and at the same time. All the judges for the three competitions were also the same.

== Medal table ==
* Host nation (United States)

| Rank | Nation | Gold | Silver | Bronze | Total |
|---|---|---|---|---|---|
| 1 | Austria | 1 | 1 | 0 | 2 |
| 2 | France | 1 | 0 | 0 | 1 |
| 2 | Norway | 1 | 0 | 0 | 1 |
| 4 | United States* | 0 | 1 | 2 | 3 |
| 5 | Canada | 0 | 1 | 0 | 1 |
| 6 | Switzerland | 0 | 0 | 1 | 1 |
| Totals (6 entries) | | 3 | 3 | 3 | 9 |

== Results ==
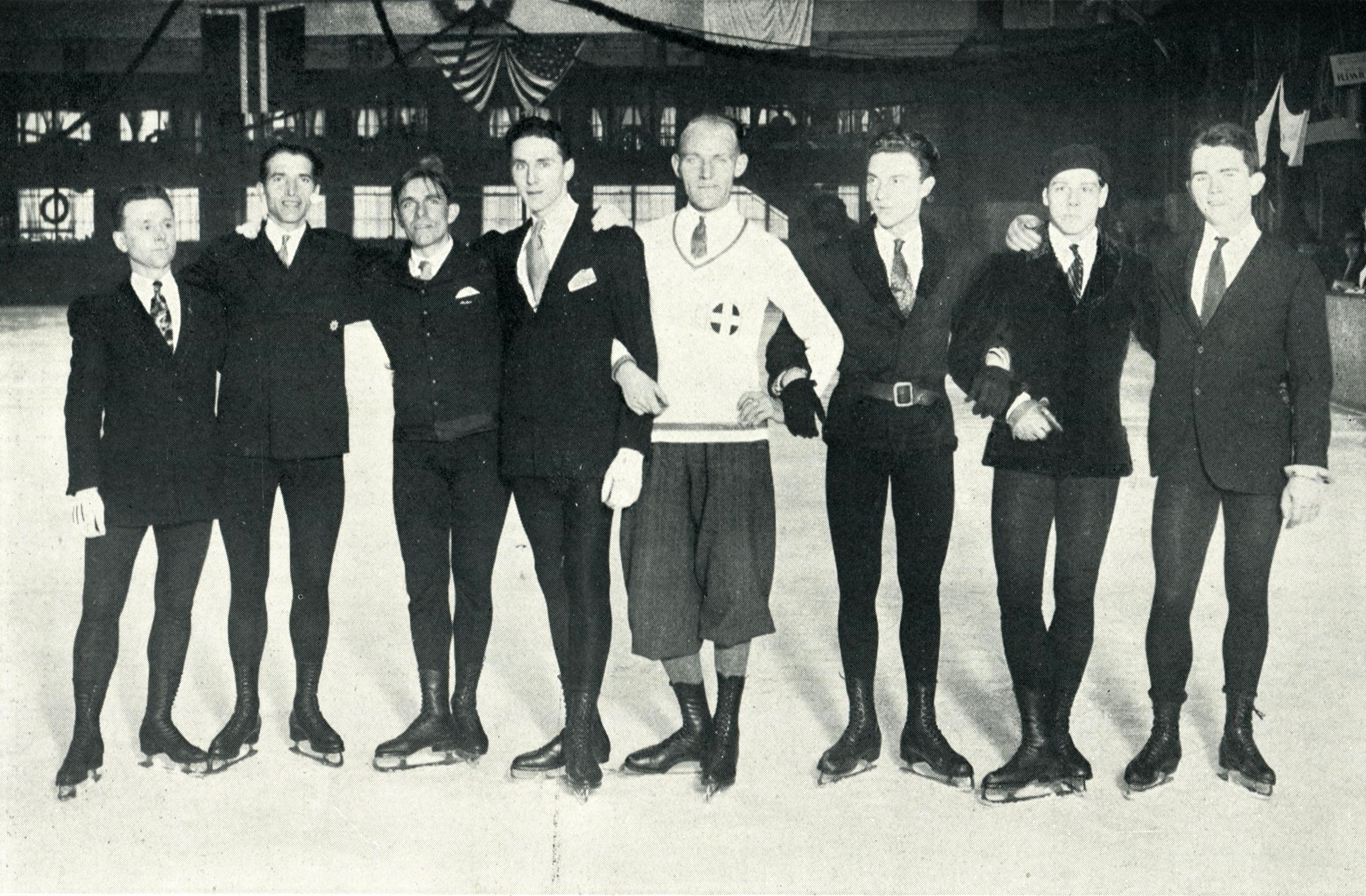
Left to right: Nagle, Wrede, Turner, Wilson, Gautchi, Schafer, Borden, Madden

=== Men ===
| Rank | Name | Places |
|---|---|---|
| 1 | (Austria) Karl Schäfer | 5 |
| 2 | (United States) Roger Turner | 11 |
| 3 | (Switzerland) Georges Gautschi | 19 |
| 4 | (Canada) Montgomery Wilson | 20 |
| 5 | (Austria) Ludwig Wrede | 20 |
| 6 | (United States) Gail Borden | 32 |
| 7 | (United States) Lester Madden | 35 |
| 8 | (United States) William Nagle | 38 |

Judges:

- (Norway) B. Børjeson
- (United Kingdom) Herber Clarke
- (Austria) J. Edhoffer
- (United States) J. B. Liberman
- (Canada) J. C. McDougall

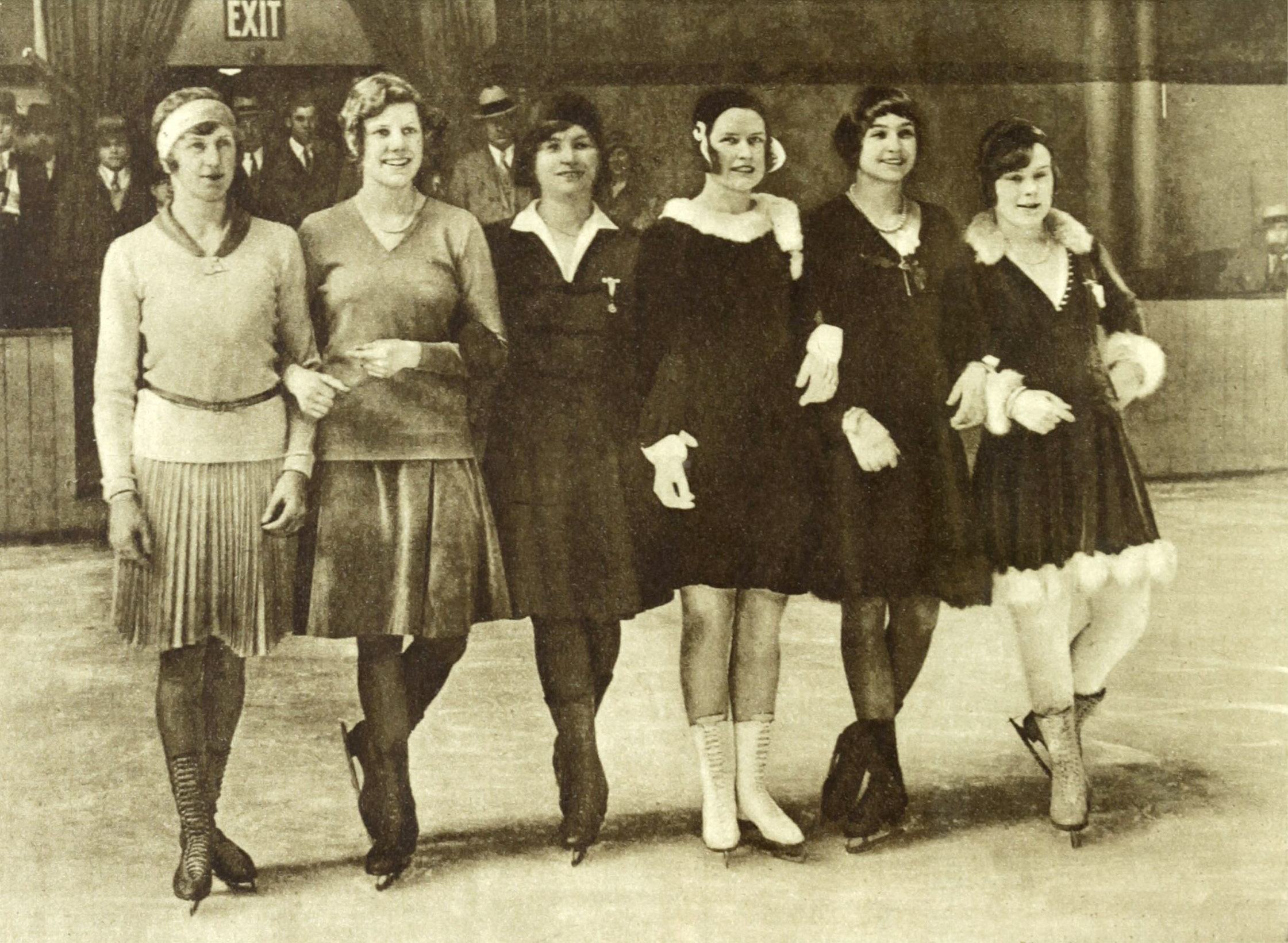
Left to right: Wilson, Davis, Brunner, Smith, Vinson, Henie

=== Ladies ===
| Rank | Name | Places |
|---|---|---|
| 1 | (Norway) Sonja Henie | 5 |
| 2 | (Canada) Cecil Smith | 12 |
| 3 | (United States) Maribel Vinson | 16 |
| 4 | (Canada) Constance Wilson | 19 |
| 5 | (Austria) Melitta Brunner | 23 |
| 6 | (United States) Suzanne Davis | 30 |

Judges:

- (Norway) B. Børjeson
- (United Kingdom) Herbert Clarke
- (Austria) J. Edhoffer
- (United States) J. B. Liberman
- (Canada) J. C. McDougall

=== Pairs ===
| Rank | Name | Places |
|---|---|---|
| 1 | (France) Andrée Brunet / Pierre Brunet | 6.5 |
| 2 | (Austria) Melitta Brunner / Ludwig Wrede | 13.5 |
| 3 | (United States) Beatrix Loughran / Sherwin Badger | 16 |
| 4 | (Canada) Constance Samuel / Montgomery Wilson | 21 |
| 5 | (Canada) Isobel Rogers / Melville Rogers | 25.5 |
| 6 | (United States) Theresa Weld / Nathaniel Niles | 30.5 |
| 7 | (Canada) Maude Smith / Jack Eastwood | 32.5 |
| 8 | (United States) Edith Secord / Joseph Savage | 34.5 |

Judges:

- (Norway) B. Børjeson
- (United Kingdom) Herbert Clarke
- (Austria) J. Edhoffer
- (United States) J. B. Liberman
- (Canada) J. C. McDougall
