= Jeanne Chevalier =

Canadian figure skater

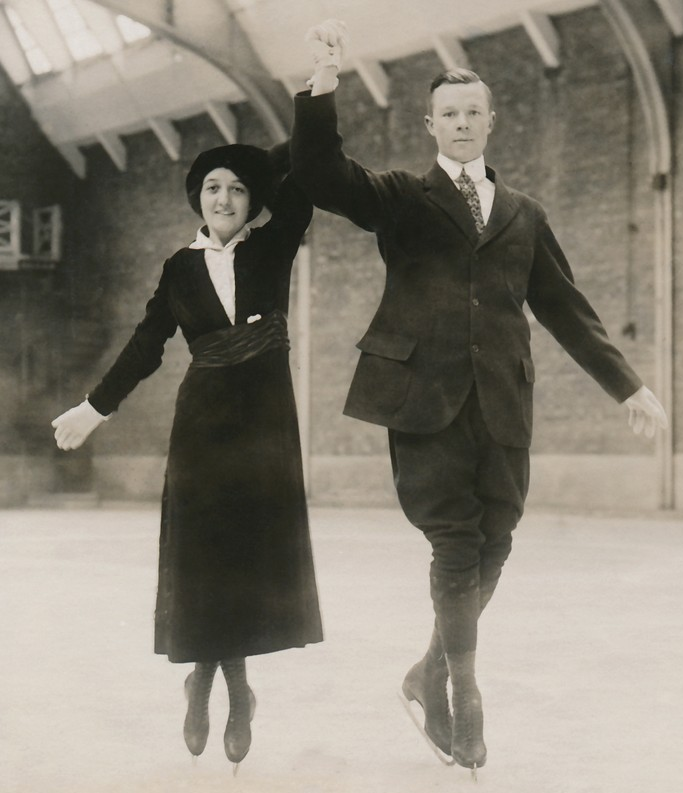
- Chevalier with partner Norman M. Scott around 1914

Personal information
- Born: November 27, 1891 Montreal, Quebec, Canada
- Died: December 8, 1984 (aged 92) Bournezeau, Vendée, France

Figure skating career
- Country: Canada
- Partner: Norman M. Scott
- Skating club: Winter Club of Montreal

Jeanne Chevalier (March 19, 1892 – December 8, 1984) was a Canadian figure skater who competed in single skating and pair skating as well as four skating. As a single skater, she is the 1920 and 1921 Canadian champion, and she and Norman M. Scott won the 1914 Canadian pairs title as well as the 1914 American pair title. Chevalier was part of the four teams that won the Canadian fours championships in 1910, 1920 and 1921.

== Career ==
Chevalier first competed at the Canadian National Skating Championships in 1910 in the four skating competition. Her group was the only one that competed.

In 1912, she competed in pair skating with Allen Richardson, and they placed second. Her fours skating group came in second place. In 1913, competing in singles, she placed second at the Canadian National Skating Championships; the only other competitor was Eleanor Kingsford, who placed first. In pairs, she skated with Norman M. Scott, and they placed second of the two couples. The next year, she came second to Muriel Maunsell, again as the only other competitor, and she won the pairs competition with Scott. That year, the first U.S. Championships were held, and at the time, they were open to Canadians. Chevalier and Scott traveled to New Haven, Connecticut and won the first American pairs title.

There were no Championships held between 1915 and 1919 due to World War I. During the war, she trained as a nurse and worked at a military hospital. After the war, in 1920 and 1921, Chevalier won two consecutive single skating titles, and she also was a member of the winning fours groups both years. Chevalier retired from competitive skating afterward.

== Personal life ==
Chevalier's grandfather was a French consul, and her father was the general manager of Crédit Foncier Franco-Canadien. Her mother, Charlotte Peters, was of Irish descent and from a family of architects. She had three brothers.

In 1922, her family decided to return to France. There, she met Louis Esgonnière du Thibeuf, and they married in June 1923. The couple lived in a château in Bournezeau and had three daughters. They enjoyed hunting, but their horses were taken by the Germans during World War II.

Chevalier's daughters reported seeing her skate only twice. She died on December 8, 1984.

== Results ==
=== Women's singles ===
Competition placements between the 1912–1913 and 1920–1921 season
| Season | 1912–1913 | 1913–1914 | 1919–1920 | 1920–1921 |
|---|---|---|---|---|
| Canadian Championships | 2nd | 2nd | 1st | 1st |

=== Pair skating ===
==== With Richardson ====
Competition placements between the 1912–1913 and season
| Season | 1912–1913 |
|---|---|
| Canadian Championships | 2nd |

==== With Scott ====
Competition placements between the 1912–1913 and 1913–1914 season
| Season | 1912–1913 | 1913–1914 |
|---|---|---|
| Canadian Championships | 2nd | 1st |
| U.S. Championships | | 1st |

=== Four skating ===
Competition placements between the 1911–1912 and 1920–1921 season
| Season | 1911–1912 | 1919–1920 | 1920–1921 |
|---|---|---|---|
| Canadian Championships | 2nd | 1st | 1st |
