= Constance Wilson-Samuel =

Canadian figure skater

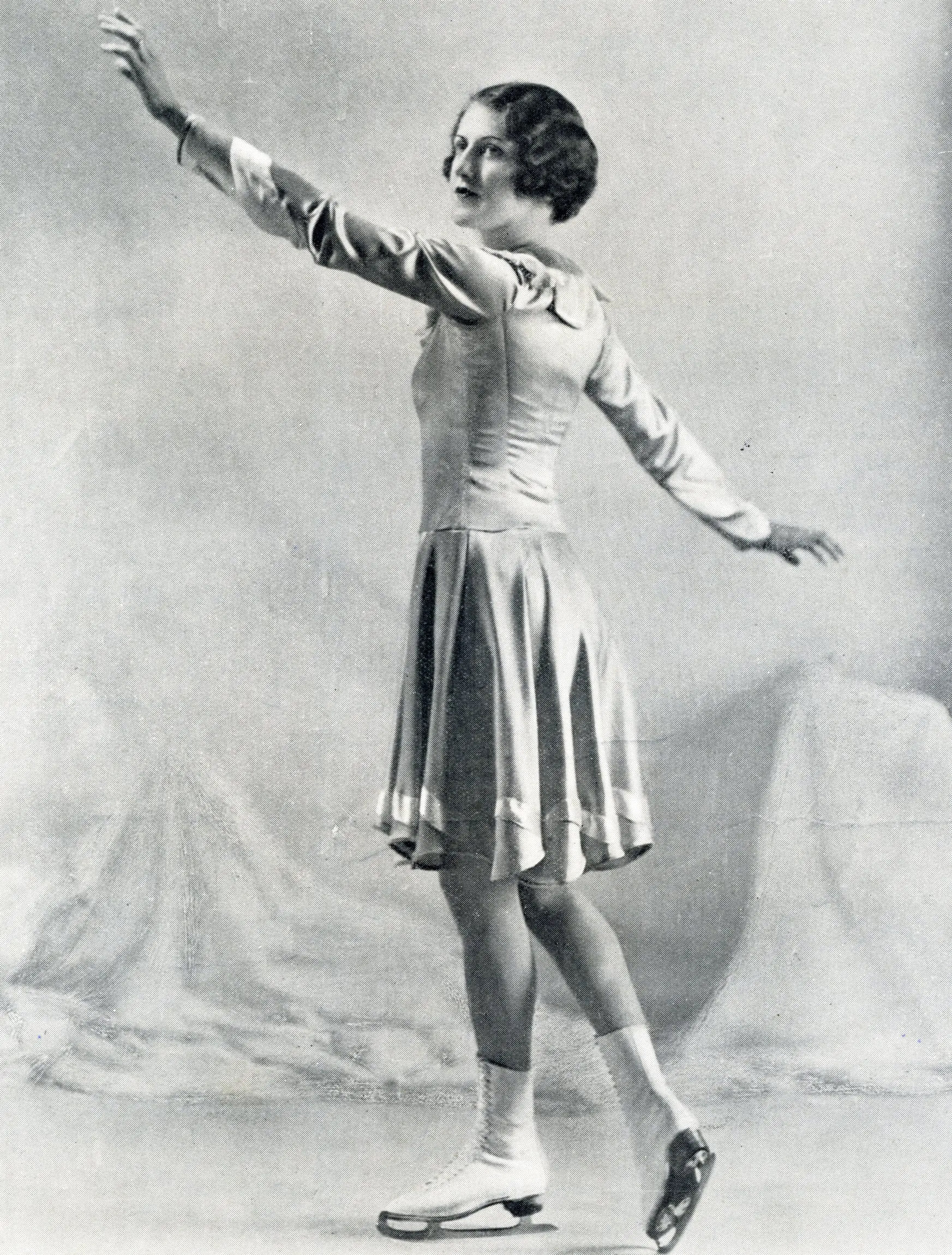
- Wilson-Samuel in 1934

Personal information
- Born: January 7, 1908 Toronto, Ontario
- Died: February 28, 1953 (aged 45)

Figure skating career
- Country: Canada
- Retired: 1936
Medal record
Representing Canada
Ladies' single skating
World Championships
Bronze medal – third place	1932 Montreal	Ladies' singles
North American Championships
Gold medal – first place	1935 Montreal	Ladies' singles
Gold medal – first place	1933 New York	Ladies' singles
Gold medal – first place	1931 Ottawa	Ladies' singles
Gold medal – first place	1929 Boston	Ladies' singles
Silver medal – second place	1927 Toronto	Ladies' singles
Pair skating
North American Championships
Silver medal – second place	1935 Montreal	Pairs
Gold medal – first place	1933 New York	Pairs
Gold medal – first place	1931 Ottawa	Pairs
Gold medal – first place	1929 Boston	Pairs
Bronze medal – third place	1927 Toronto	Pairs
Four skating
North American Championships
Silver medal – second place	1933 New York	Fours

Constance Wilson-Samuel, later Constance Wilson Slatkin, (January 7, 1908 – February 28, 1953) was a Canadian figure skater, born in Toronto, Ontario, who competed in both women's singles and pair skating. She represented Canada at three Olympics (1928, 1932, 1936).

Competing in women's singles, she was the 1932 World bronze medallist, a four-time North American champion, a nine-time Canadian national champion, and the 1928 British Champion. At the Olympics, she placed sixth in 1928 and fourth in 1932. In pair skating, primarily competing with her brother Montgomery Wilson, she was a three-time North American champion and a six-time Canadian national champion. They placed fifth at the 1932 Olympics. She also won silver in four skating at the 1933 North American Championships in partnership with her brother, Elizabeth Fisher, and Hubert Sprott.

== Career ==
Wilson-Samuel was an early student of Gustave Lussi, who would go on to coach many other prominent skaters as well. In 1923, at age 15, she won her first medal at the Canadian National Championships, a bronze. The next year, she won her first of nine national titles. In 1925 and 1926, she won the silver medal behind Cecil Smith; in 1926, she also competed in pairs with Errol Morson and won.

She then reclaimed her national singles title in 1927 and began competing in pairs with her brother, Montgomery Wilson. They placed second at the Canadian Championships. That year, Wilson-Samuel competed for the first time at the North American Championships. In singles, she won silver behind Beatrix Loughran, and in pairs, she and her brother placed third.

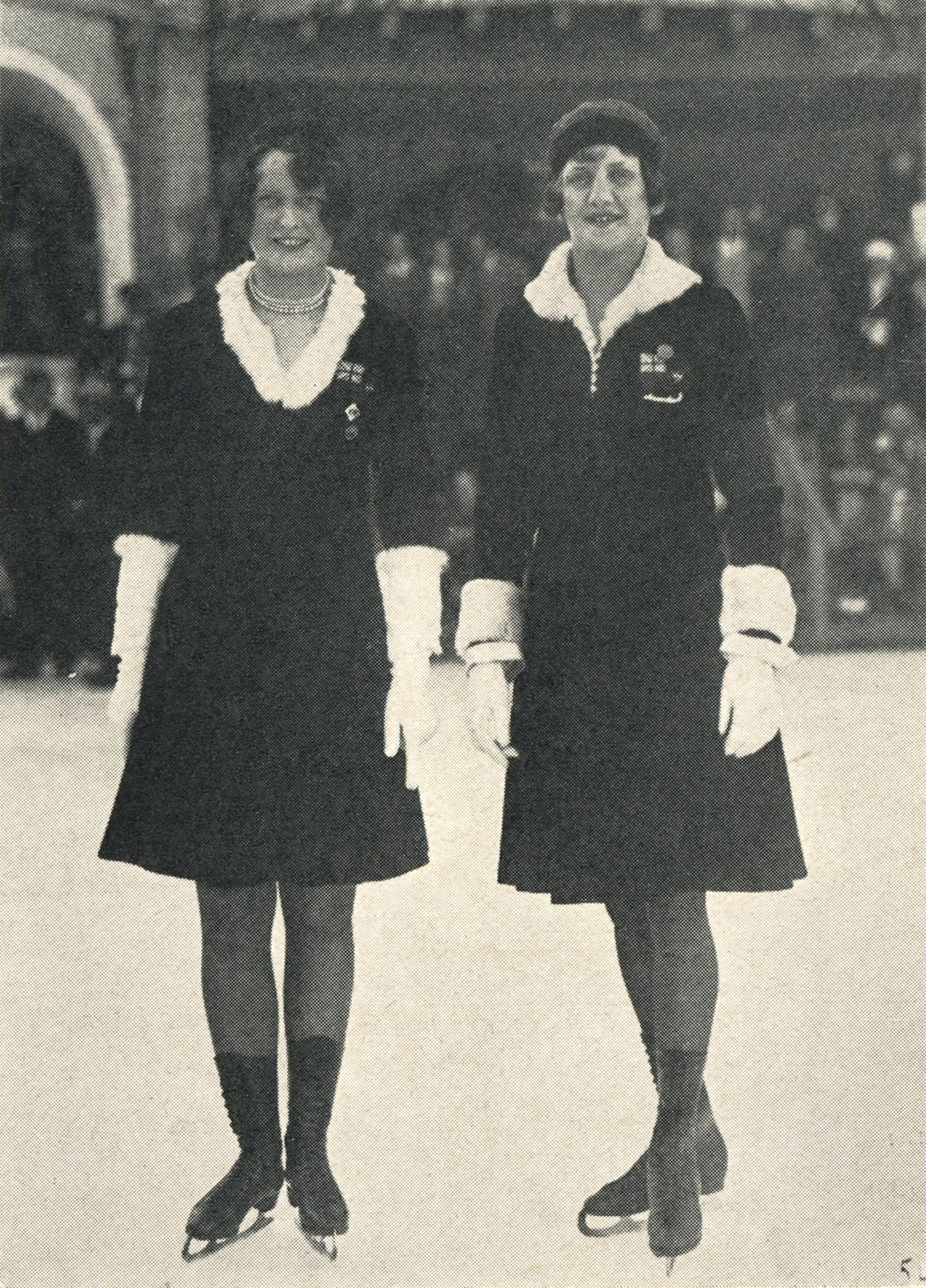
Cecil Smith (left) with Wilson-Samuel (right) at the 1928 Winter Olympics

In February 1928, Wilson-Samuel competed at the 1928 Winter Olympics, where she placed 6th. Soon thereafter, she competed at the World Championships, held in London, and placed 4th. At age 24, she and Kathleen Shaw were the oldest women in the competition. Later in March, she competed not in the Canadian Championships but the British Championships, which were open to all British subjects. She won the competition ahead of Cecil Smith.

The next year, she won the Canadian Championships both in singles and in pairs with her brother, and she also won both events at the 1929 North American Championships. Frederick Goodridge, writing on the North American Championships for Skating Magazine, wrote that she won the competition on the strength of her compulsory figures and her free skating had good jumps and spins, though he also added, "Many feel that Miss Wilson's form is marred by a habit of raising her elbows."

In 1930, Wilson-Samuel won a second consecutive national title in both singles and pairs. In February, she competed at her second World Championships, held in New York City. The New York Times reported that "her back swirl spins were done with much brilliance" and that she had a good reception from the audience. She placed 4th in both the single skating and pair competitions.

The next year, she was again Canadian champion in single skating, and she and her brother won silver in pairs. Theresa Weld-Blanchard, describing Wilson-Samuel's winning performance at 1931 North American Championships, noted that she used very good pushes to begin her figures: "no sign of the popular but incorrect use of the toe point!". In her pair skating program with her brother, where they again won, the two performed side-by-side Axel jumps and an element with two loop jumps.

In February 1932, Wilson-Samuel competed at the 1932 Winter Olympics. She placed 4th behind Maribel Vinson in the singles competition. In the pairs competition, the Wilsons placed 5th. Joel Liberman, writing in Skating magazine, criticized them for skating too far apart from each other. Later in the month, at the 1932 World Championships, held in her home country of Canada, Wilson-Samuel won the bronze medal, and she placed 6th with her brother in pairs. In March, she won a fourth consecutive Canadian single title and a third pairs title with her brother.

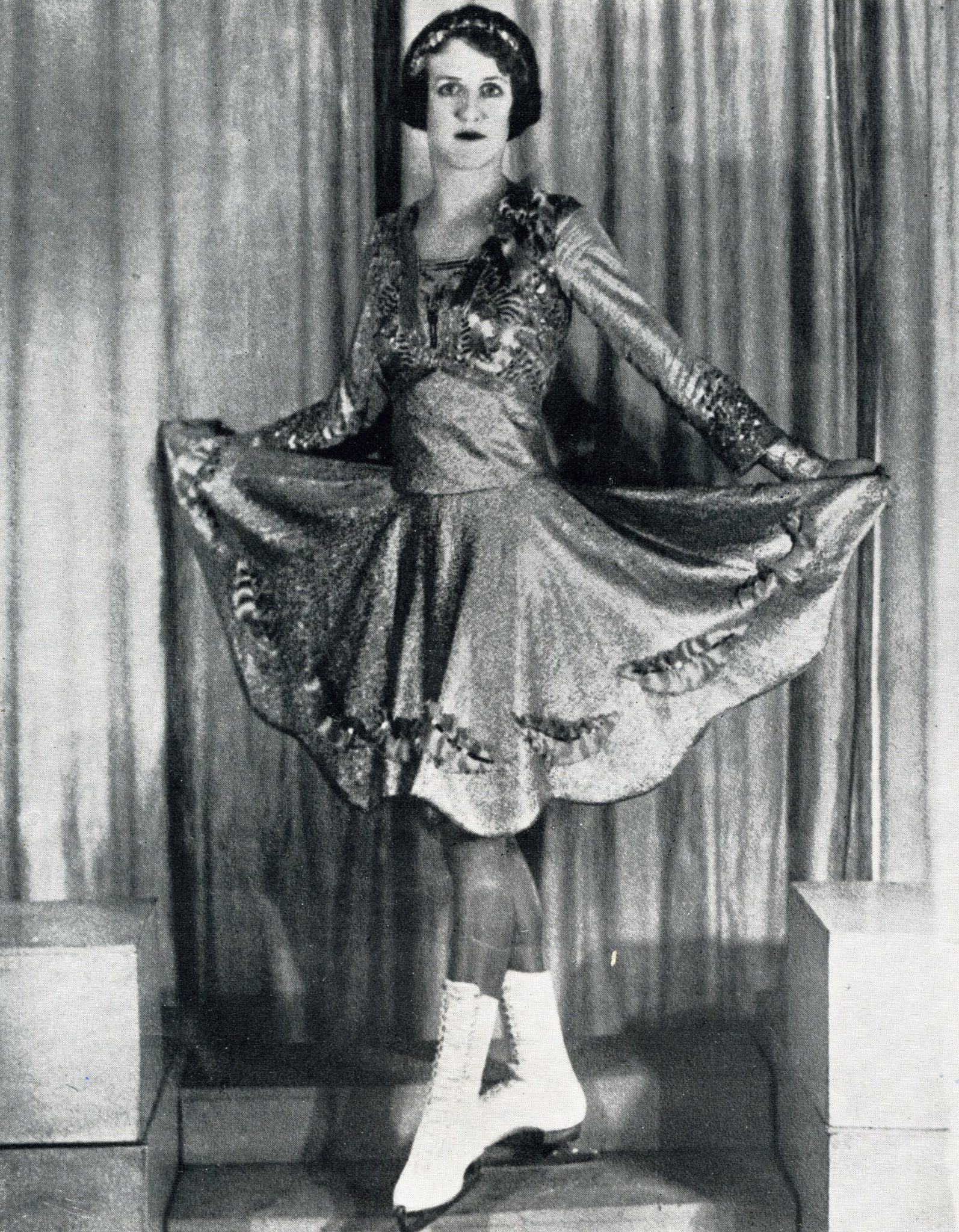
Wilson-Samuel at her club's annual carnival in 1933

The next year, she won two more Canadian titles in singles and pairs. At the North American Championships, she won a third consecutive title both in singles, ahead of Cecil Smith, and in pairs with her brother. In Skating magazine, Liberman praised her "superb" ability to retrace her compulsory figures. For the first time, she also competed in the four skating competition with her brother, Elizabeth Fisher, and Hubert Sprott, and the group placed second.

In 1934, Wilson-Samuel won a sixth consecutive Canadian singles title and her fifth pairs title. The year after, in January, she won her last singles title, her ninth overall, and placed third in pairs. In February, she won her fourth straight North American title in singles, after skating "very large and symmetrical" figures and a difficult free skate, and she won silver in pairs.

Her last international competition was the 1936 Winter Olympics, where she was the only Canadian woman to compete. However, during the figures segment, she collapsed due to a cold and was taken to a hospital. Because of this, she withdrew from the competition.

She later announced her retirement from competitive skating and said she planned to coach and choreograph ice carnivals. However, she returned to the 1938 Canadian Championships to compete in four skating, where she teamed up with her brother, Veronica Clarke, and Ralph McCreath to win gold, and the waltz competition, where she won bronze with her brother. The next year, she and her brother came second out of two pairs in the waltz competition.

== Later and personal life ==
Wilson-Samuel remained active in figure skating and became a judge.

Her nickname was "Connie". She married Norman Samuel, the son of Sigmund Samuel, in 1929. In 1940, it was reported that he was an officer in the Queen's Own Rifles of Canada, and Wilson-Samuel arranged a benefit tea for the regiment. They later divorced.

In 1944, she married Alfred Slatkin and remained married to him until her death. She had two sons, one with each of her husbands, named Stewart and Montgomery. She spent the last five years of her life in Kansas City, Missouri in the United States before dying on February 28, 1953.

In 1990, she was posthumously inducted into the Canadian Figure Skating Hall of Fame along with Montgomery Wilson.

== Results ==
=== Ladies' singles ===
International
Event	1923	1924	1925	1926	1927	1928	1929	1930	1931	1932	1933	1934	1935	1936
Winter Olympics						6th				4th				WD
World Champ.						4th		4th		3rd				
North American Champ.					2nd		1st		1st		1st		1st	
National
Canadian Champ.	3rd	1st	2nd	2nd	1st		1st	1st	1st	1st	1st	1st	1st	
British Champ.						1st								
WD = Withdrew

=== Pairs with Morson ===
National
Event	1926
Canadian Championships	1st

=== Pairs with Wilson ===
International
Event	1927	1928	1929	1930	1931	1932	1933	1934	1935
Winter Olympics						5th			
World Championships				4th		6th			
North American Championships	3rd		1st		1st		1st		2nd
National
Canadian Championships	2nd		1st	1st	2nd	1st	1st	1st	3rd

=== Fours with Fisher, Wilson, and Sprott ===
International
Event	1933
North American Championships	2nd
