= Cecil Smith (figure skater) =

Canadian figure skater (1908–1997)

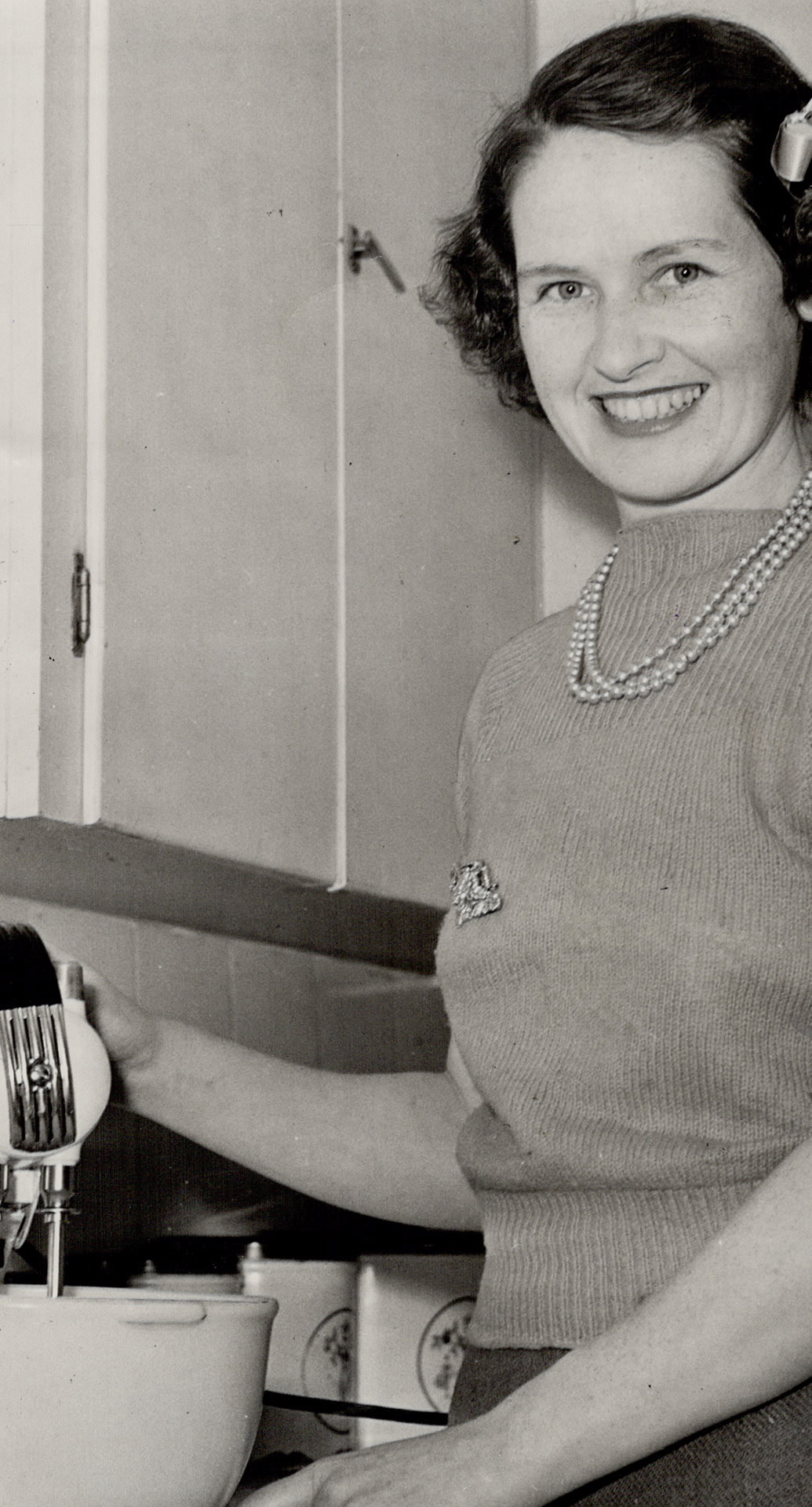
- Smith in 1938

Personal information
- Full name: Cecil Elaine Eustace Smith
- Born: September 14, 1908 Toronto, Canada
- Died: November 9, 1997 (aged 89)

Figure skating career
- Country: Canada
- Partner: Melville Rogers; Stewart Reburn (former)
- Skating club: Toronto Skating Club
Medal record
Representing Canada
Figure skating
World Championships
Silver medal – second place	1930 New York	Ladies' singles
North American Championships
Silver medal – second place	1933 New York	Ladies' singles
Bronze medal – third place	1927 Toronto	Ladies' singles
Silver medal – second place	1925 Boston	Ladies' singles

Cecil Elaine Eustace Smith, later Gooderham, then Hedstrom (September 14, 1908 – November 9, 1997), was a Canadian figure skater. In 1924 she became the first female figure skater to represent Canada at Winter Olympics; she placed sixth individually and seventh in pairs, together with Melville Rogers. At the 1928 Winter Olympics she finished fifth individually. In 1930, she won the silver medal at the World Figure Skating Championships in singles.

== Biography ==
In 1922, Smith won the national junior title, and next year was a runner-up as a senior. Aged 15, she participated in the 1924 Winter Olympic Games, held in Chamonix, France. In the women's singles, she finished sixth, two places ahead of Sonja Henie. In the pairs competition, she placed seventh.

Smith won the Canadian championship in 1925 and 1926. In 1928, she competed in her second Olympics and place fifth in the women's singles (Sonja Henie claimed the gold). In 1930, she became the first Canadian to win a World championship figure skating medal, earning a silver medal in New York City. In 1991 she was inducted into the Skate Canada Hall of Fame.

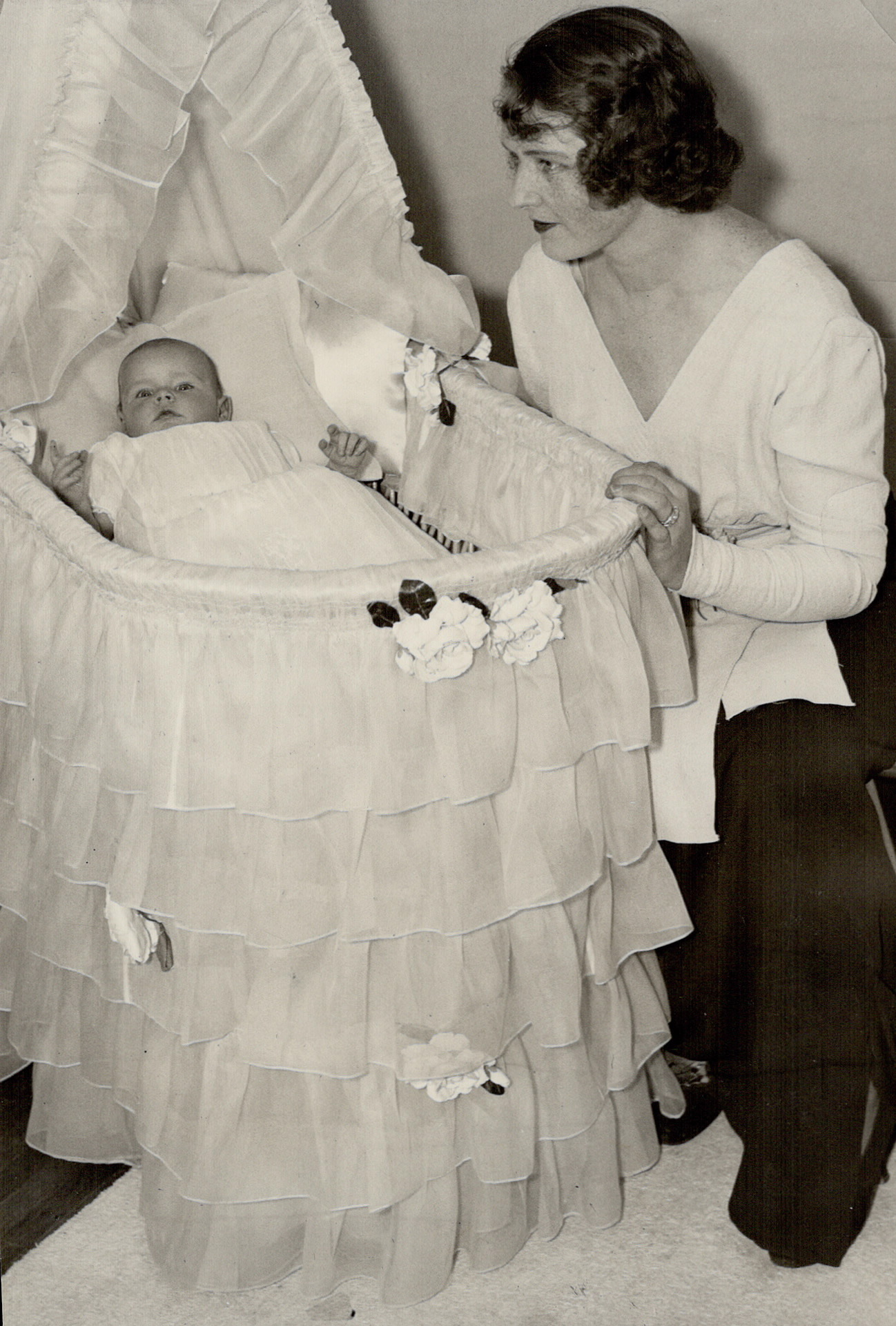
Smith with son in 1935

Smith changed her last name twice, first to Gooderham, then to Hedstrom. Around 1935 she gave birth to a son named Edward Douglas Gooderham. She had an elder sister Maude, who also competed at the 1928 Olympics, but in pairs. Their mother, Maude Delano-Osborne, won the 1892 Canadian tennis championship.

== Competitive highlights ==
=== Ladies' singles ===
Event	1923	1924	1925	1926	1927	1928	1929	1930	1931	1932	1933
Winter Olympics		6th				5th					
World Championships								2nd			
North American Championships			2nd		3rd						2nd
Canadian Championships	2nd		1st	1st	2nd		2nd		2nd		2nd

=== Pairs ===
(with Rogers)

Event	1923	1924
Winter Olympics		7th
Canadian Championships	3rd	

(with Reburn)

Event	1931
Canadian Championships	1st

=== Fours ===
(with Jack Eastwood, Maude Smith, and Montgomery Wilson)

International
Event	1926	1927
Canadian Championships	1st	1st

(with Jack Eastwood, Maude Smith, and H.W.D. Foster)

International
Event	1929
Canadian Championships	3rd

(with Jack Eastwood, Maude Smith, and Stewart Reburn)

International
Event	1931
Canadian Championships	2nd

(with Jack Eastwood, Maude Smith, and Osborne Colson)

International
Event	1934
Canadian Championships	3rd
