= Dorothy Caley =

Canadian figure skater

Dorothy Anne Caley Klein
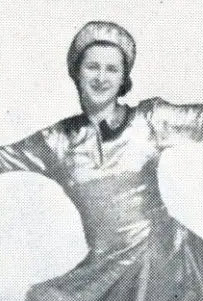
- Caley in 1939

Personal information
- Born: February 14, 1920 Toronto, Ontario, Canada
- Died: September 5, 2012 (aged 92) Richmond Hill, Ontario, Canada

Figure skating career
- Country: Canada

Dorothy Anne Caley Klein (February 14, 1920 – September 5, 2012) was a Canadian figure skater who primarily competed in women's singles. She was the 1937 Canadian champion. After retiring from competition, she performed in ice shows as a pair with her sister, Hazel Caley.

== Competitive career ==
Caley and her sister learned to skate in their backyard, where their father made a homemade rink. Later, they trained at the Granite Club.

The two sisters initially competed locally in women's pairs, but after the event was abolished, they competed as single skaters. Caley made her first appearance at the Canadian Championships in 1934, where she placed 4th of four skaters in the senior event.

She won the women's junior category in 1936; the next year, she won the senior category. She and her sister both competed that year, wearing matching clothing. Hazel Caley placed 4th overall.

In 1937, she competed at the North American Championships, where she placed third in the compulsory figures but ended up fourth after the free skating behind her two fellow Canadians. The next year, she placed second at the Canadian Championships.

Caley placed 4th at the 1939 Canadian Championships; an article about the event in Skating magazine described her program as including a quick spin with a smooth change of feet through a jump. At that year's North American Championships, she placed 6th. She also competed in the four skating event with her sister, Montgomery Wilson, and Ralph McCreath. They won the event.

As a skater, Caley was praised for her speed, both when skating alone and when skating with her sister.

== Post-competitive career ==
The two sisters contemplated performing a tour of Australia. They also wanted to attempt to qualify for the 1940 Winter Olympics, for which they had been asked to demonstrate women's pairs, but the Games were cancelled due to World War II. They began to tour with Sonja Henie and found success on the tour, typically skating as a pair. In 1942, Hazel took time off to have a child; during that time, Dorothy skated by herself. The next year, Hazel rejoined her on the show circuit.

== Personal life ==
In addition to Hazel, Caley had three other sisters. Her nickname was "Dodie". Outside of skating, she enjoyed golf and gardening. She married Arthur Klein and had two children with him. She died September 5, 2012 at Mackenzie Health.
