= Gustave Lussi =

Swiss figure skating coach (1898–1993)

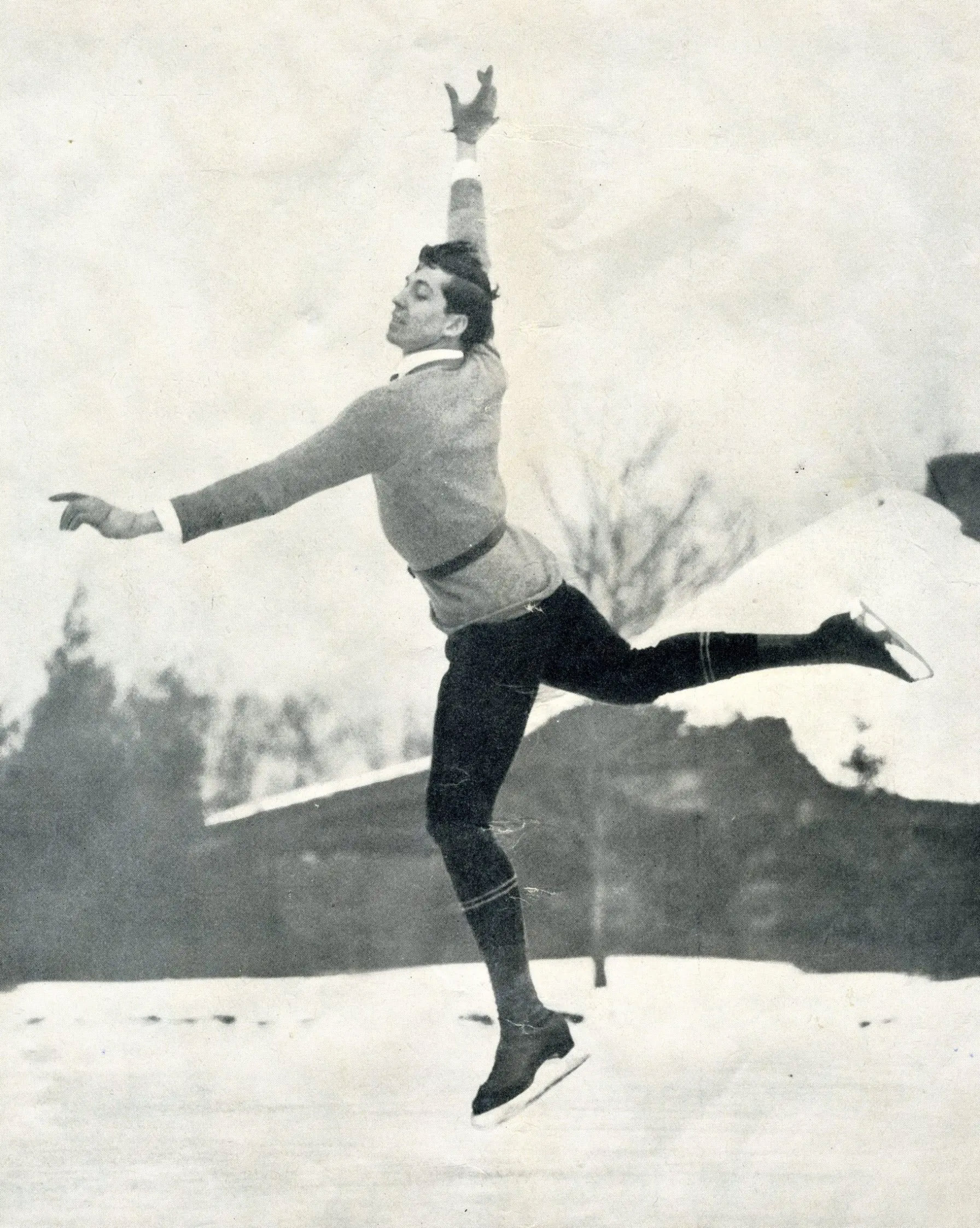

Personal information
- Full name: Gustave François Lussi
- Born: June 2, 1898 Stans, Switzerland
- Died: June 23, 1993 (aged 95) Lake Placid, New York

Gustave François Lussi (June 2, 1898 – June 23, 1993) was a figure skating coach. He lived in Lake Placid, New York, and was instrumental in producing popular ice shows in the 1930s and after. Using the rinks from the 1932 Winter Olympics, he trained students during the summer, a practice unusual at the time. Among his students were Dick Button and Dorothy Hamill.

== Personal life ==
Lussi was born in Stans, Switzerland. He himself was not a competitive skater but a ski jumper. He lost his nerve for that sport after a fall and became interested in skating instead. His previous experience with the sport was only recreational skating on Lake Lucerne as a boy.

In 1919, Lussi emigrated to the United States, landing in New York City. He became a U.S. citizen in 1927. In 1932, he married Thelma McDowell, also a skater, with whom he had two sons. He died on June 23, 1993, at the age of 95.

== Coaching career ==
Lussi supported another Swiss emigrant, a skating coach named De Bergen, and himself in New York while learning skating from De Bergen. Considering himself to be big and gawky, he vowed that if he could not be a world champion himself, he would produce one through his teaching. A few years later, while teaching in Philadelphia as De Bergen's assistant he started pioneering his own methodology, and left Philadelphia for a while to coach in Canada and Lake Placid.

His first champion student was Egbert S. Carey Jr., who won the U.S. junior men's title in 1924. At around the same time, he and his student, Montgomery "Bud" Wilson, invented the flip jump. In 1928, Bud Wilson and his sister, Constance Wilson-Samuel, became Lussi's first World Champions. Lussi coached Dick Button in Lake Placid from the age of twelve. He coached skaters in Atlantic City in the 1940s. By 1951, journalists described him in print as a "world-renowned coach."

Lussi introduced checking the jump landings instead of turning a three after landing, a program as composition with a beginning and ending instead of the official just banging a gong to signal the end of the allotted time to perform, closing the figures on the backward pushes which until that time were left open, the original design for the Pattern 99 blade, the flying sit spin, the flying camel or Button Camel spin with Dick Button, the crossed-leg rotation position in jumping and spinning, the double Axel jump, the triple jumps, the delayed Axel and delayed-rotation double and triple jumps.

Lussi also started summer skating in Lake Placid after the Olympic Arena was enclosed in 1932 for the Winter Olympics. He convinced the local municipality to open the arena for a month that summer and imported skaters from Canada to perform shows that summer. His father-in-law painted the ice for these great extravaganzas. These shows led to his being hired to choreograph the shows for Ice Capades for several years.

== Legacy ==
Lussi's skaters are known for their strong spinning technique. Lussi was also responsible for developing modern figure skating jump technique, including the now-standard crossed-leg rotation, or back spin, position in the air. His pupil Dick Button was the first to perform a double Axel and the first triple loop jump in competition, and Lussi students were also the first performers of flying spins such as the flying camel and flying sit spin which are now a standard part of every elite skater's repertoire.

In April 1990, a documentary film Gustave Lussi: The Man Who Changed Skating was shown on the PBS television network. The documentary was conceived and co-produced by his former student Cecily Morrow and produced by station WCFE-TV. Around this time Morrow also worked with Lussi to produce a series of instructional videos, entitled Systematic Figure Skating: The Spin and Jump Techniques of Gustave Lussi, capturing his coaching techniques.

Some of Lussi's other students, such as Carlo Fassi, Ron Ludington, Mary Scotvold, Robin Wagner, Cecily Morrow, and Priscilla Hill, have also become successful coaches who passed on Lussi's techniques. Lussi was inducted into the professional Skaters Association Coaches Hall of Fame in 2002.

On December 15, 2015, U.S. Figure Skating announced Lussi would be a member of the U.S. Figure Skating Hall of Fame Class of 2016.
