= Winifred Silverthorne =

British pair skater

Personal information
- Full name: Winifred Ellen "Winnie" Silverthorne
- Other names: Winnie
- Born: 3 March 1925 Brighton, England
- Died: 7 March 1998 (aged 73)

Figure skating career
- Country: United Kingdom
Medal record
Representing United Kingdom
Pairs Figure skating
European Championships
Silver medal – second place	1947 Davos	Pairs

Winifred Ellen "Winnie" Silverthorne (3 March 1925 – 7 March 1998) was a British pair skater who competed with her brother Dennis Silverthorne. The pair won the silver medal at the 1947 European Figure Skating Championships and finished fourth at that year's World Figure Skating Championships. They then finished fifth at the 1948 Winter Olympics and sixth at that year's World Championships. She was born in Brighton, England.

== Results ==
(with Silverthorne)

Event	1947	1948
Winter Olympics		5th
World Championships	4th	6th
European Championships	2nd	
