= Cecily Morrow =

Cecily Alexandra Morrow is a United States Figure Skating (USFS) gold medalist in teaching figure skating. Cecily was born in 1958, and started skating at age three in Baltimore, Maryland with Bob and Joan Ogilvie. She trained with World and Olympic coaches Gustave Lussi in freeskating and figures, Carlo Fassi in figures, and Natalia Dubova in ice dance, to name a few. In addition, she has extensive, off-ice dance training in ballet, jazz, modern, step-dance, and physical conditioning.

Beginning her professional coaching career in 1974, she has taught all levels of skating from beginner to World and Olympic Champions. For many years, Cecily taught skating at the Skating Club of New York (NYC) and at the Olympic Center in Lake Placid, New York, including workshops with Gustave Lussi. Cecily instructs, is a consultant to, and collaborator with, other coaches in the US and Canada; upon their request she gives workshops and private lessons to their students.

Cecily wrote, produced, and directed with Doug Wilson and Dick Button of ABC Sports, the video series Systematic Figure Skating: The Spin and Jump Techniques of Gustave Lussi, in which she appears throughout as a demonstration skater. Cecily also wrote, directed, produced, and narrated Stroking Exercises on Ice: The Dance Training Methods of Natalia Dubova. She conceived of and was associate producer on the PBS documentary Gustave Lussi: The Man Who Changed Skating. She was a co-founder and the original female soloist in the performance company, The Ice Theatre of New York, in New York City in 1984.

Systematic Figure Skating: The Spin and Jump Techniques of Gustave Lussi is available on DVD and as downloads on the website, http://www.icecommand.com.

Her formal education includes studying at Columbia University, Oxford University, and graduating with a BA from Smith College in Northampton, MA.
