= Donald McPherson (figure skater) =

Canadian figure skater

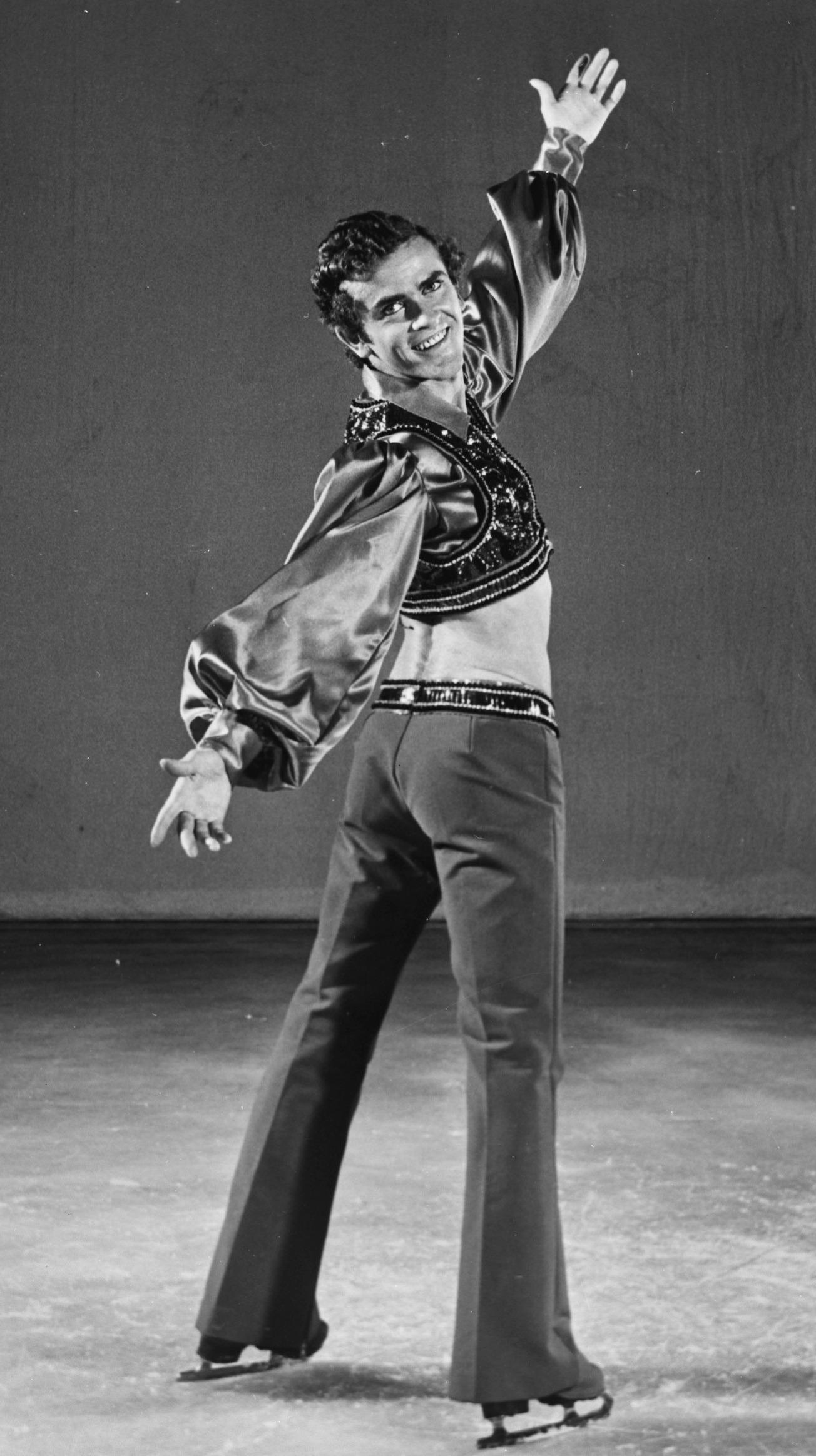
- Donald McPherson in 1972

Personal information
- Full name: John Donald McPherson
- Born: February 20, 1945 Windsor, Ontario
- Died: November 24, 2001 (aged 56) Munich, Germany

Figure skating career
- Country: Canada
- Skating club: Stratford Figure Skating Club
- Retired: 1963
Medal record
Representing Canada
Men's Figure skating
World Championships
Gold medal – first place	1963 Cortina d'Ampezzo	Men's singles
North American Championships
Gold medal – first place	1963 Vancouver	Men's singles

John Donald McPherson (February 20, 1945 – November 24, 2001) was a Canadian figure skater. He is the 1963 World Champion and the 1963 Canadian national champion. He represented Canada at the 1960 Winter Olympics, where he placed 10th at the age of 15. He turned 15 years old during the Olympic figure skating competition.

Donald McPherson started to skate with the age of 4. He represented the Stratford Figure Skating Club in Ontario, and was coached by Dennis Silverthorne. He won the 1963 World Figure Skating Championships at the age of 18, becoming the youngest men's World Champion. McPherson won his World title skating on an unusual pair of skates with small serrations in the blades.

Following that win, he turned professional, starring in Dick Button's Ice-Travanganza at the 1964 New York World's Fair. He also toured for 11 years for Holiday on Ice, and won the 1965 World Professional Figure Skating Championships.

He was inducted into the Canadian Sports Hall of Fame in 1963 and the Canadian Figure Skating Hall of Fame in 1996.

Donald McPherson was inducted into the Stratford Sports Hall of Fame in the Athlete's Section on Saturday April 16, 2011 along with Howie Morenz, Larry Landreth and Jodeyne Higgins' Also inducted were the 1977 JS News Peewees Baseball team and the 1952 Stratford Indians Senior Men's Hockey team in the Team Category. Denis 'Dinny' Flanagan was inducted in the builder's category.

Later in life, he moved to Munich, Germany. He died of complications arising from diabetes in Munich on November 24, 2001.

== Competitive highlights ==
Event	1959	1960	1961	1962	1963
Winter Olympic Games		10th			
World Championships		8th		4th	1st
North American Championships	6th		5th		1st
Canadian Championships	1st J.	2nd	2nd	2nd	1st

- J = Junior level
