= Thornton Coolidge =

American figure skater

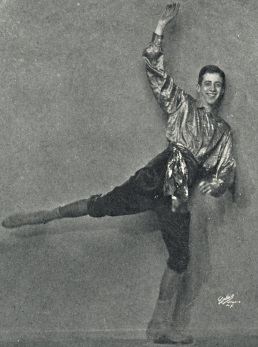

Personal information
- Died: April 9, 1936 Boston, Massachusetts

Figure skating career
- Country: United States

Thornton Coolidge was an American figure skater born in Milton, Massachusetts.

== Biography ==
Coolidge competed in pairs with Maribel Vinson and won the gold medal at the U.S. Figure Skating Championships in 1928 and 1929. The pair also captured the bronze at the North American Figure Skating Championships in 1929.

Coolidge graduated from Harvard University in 1928 and studied theatre. He died at the home of his parents after a three-week illness in 1936 at age 29 in Walpole, Massachusetts.
