= Ralph McCreath =

Canadian figure skater (1919–1997)

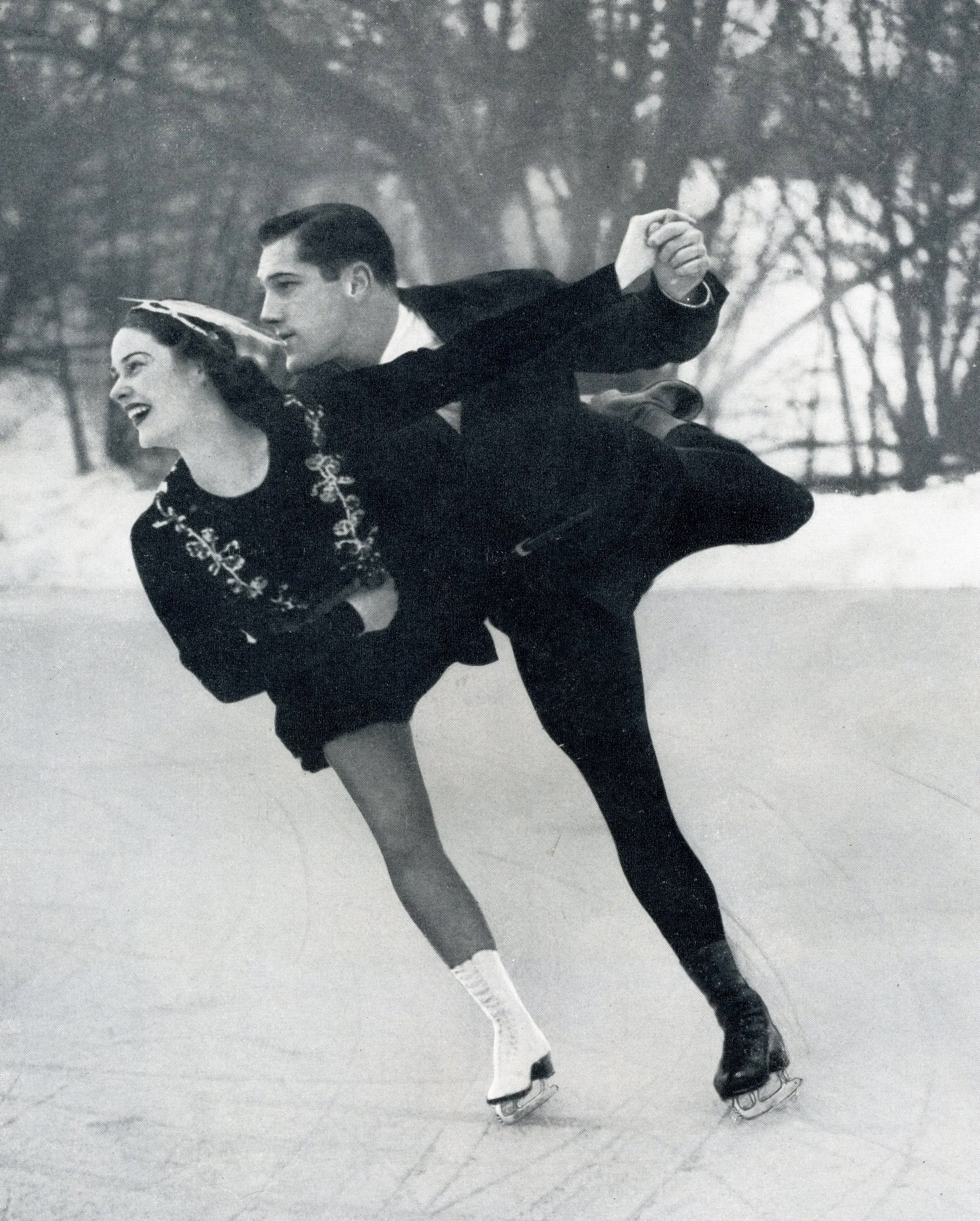
- McCreath skating with O'Meara in 1941

Personal information
- Full name: Ralph Scott McCreath
- Born: April 27, 1919
- Died: May 2, 1997 (aged 78)

Figure skating career
- Country: Canada
- Skating club: Toronto SC
Medal record
Representing Canada
Men's Figure skating
North American Championships
Bronze medal – third place	1941 Philadelphia	Men's singles
Bronze medal – third place	1939 Toronto	Men's singles
Bronze medal – third place	1937 Boston	Men's singles
Pairs' Figure skating
North American Championships
Gold medal – first place	1941 Philadelphia	Pairs
Silver medal – second place	1939 Toronto	Pairs
Gold medal – first place	1937 Boston	Pairs
Fours' Figure skating
North American Championships
Gold medal – first place	1939 Toronto	Fours

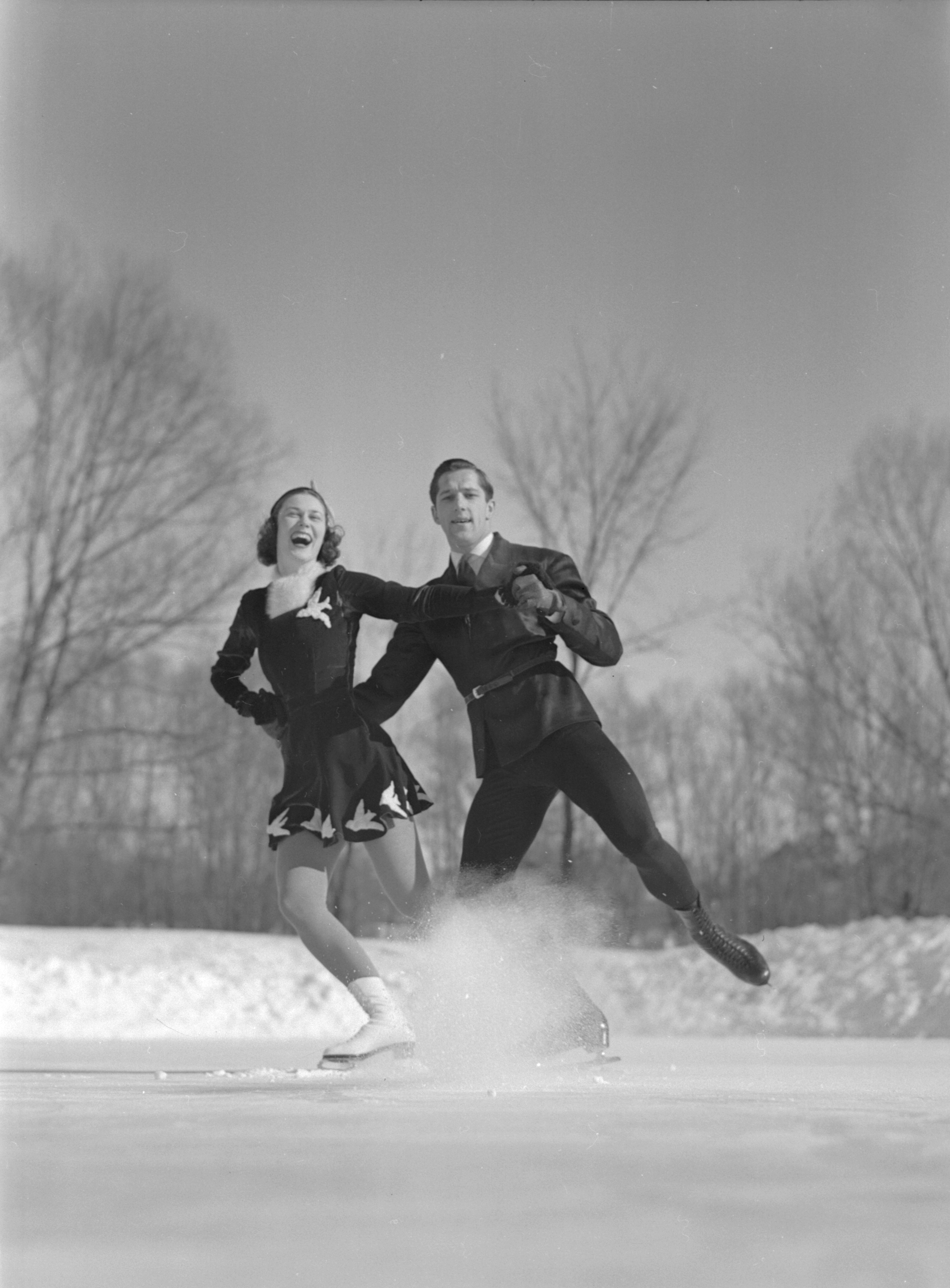
Ralph McCreath with Eleanor O'Meara

Ralph Scott McCreath (April 27, 1919 – May 2, 1997) was a Canadian figure skater who competed in single skating, pair skating, ice dancing, and fours. He competed in pairs with Veronica Clarke, Norah McCarthy, Eleanor O'Meara, Bunty Lang, and Betty Chambers, and in fours with Dorothy Caley, Hazel Caley, and Montgomery Wilson, winning the 1939 North American title.

McCreath started skating for the Toronto Skating Club in 1933. He was the 1940, 1941, and 1946 Canadian national champion and 1941 North American in single skating. In pairs, he won six national and two North American titles with three different partners. As an ice dancer, he competed with Veronica Clarke. They won the Tenstep gold medal and the Waltz silver medal at the 1937 Canadian Figure Skating Championships and the Fourteenstep gold medal at the 1938 Canadian Figure Skating Championships.

He served in the 48th Highlanders of Canada and the Royal Canadian Ordnance Corps during World War II. After his competitive career, he became a judge, team member, and member of the Canadian Figure Skating Association. He was inducted into the Canadian Figure Skating Hall of Fame in the Athlete category in 1994.

== Results ==
=== Singles career ===
Event	1934	1935	1936	1937	1938	1939	1940	1941	1946
North American Championships				3rd		3rd		1st	
Canadian Championships	3rd J.	2nd J.	1st J.	3rd	2nd	2nd	1st	1st	1st

- J = Junior level
- McCreath did not compete between 1941 and 1946 due to World War Two.

=== Pairs career ===
(with Eleanor O'Meara)

Event	1941
North American Championships	1st
Canadian Championships	1st

(with Norah McCarthy)

Event	1939	1940
North American Championships	2nd	
Canadian Championships	1st	1st

(with Veronica Clarke)

Event	1936	1937	1938
North American Championships		1st	
Canadian Championships	1st	1st	1st

(with Betty Chambers)

Event	1935
Canadian Championships	1st J.

- J = Junior level

(with Bunty Lang)

Event	1934
Canadian Championships	3rd J.

- J = Junior level

=== Ice dancing career ===
(with Veronica Clarke)

Event	1937	1938
Canadian Championships - Fourteenstep		1st
Canadian Championships - Tenstep	1st	
Canadian Championships - Waltz	2nd	

=== Fours career ===
(with Dorothy Caley, Hazel Caley, and Montgomery Wilson)

Event	1939
North American Championships	1st

(with Constance Wilson-Samuel, Montgomery Wilson, and Veronica Clarke)

Event	1938
Canadian Championships	1st

(with Elizabeth Fisher, Mrs. Spencer Merry, and Hubert Sprott)

Event	1936
Canadian Championships	2nd
