= Melitta Brunner =

Austrian figure skater

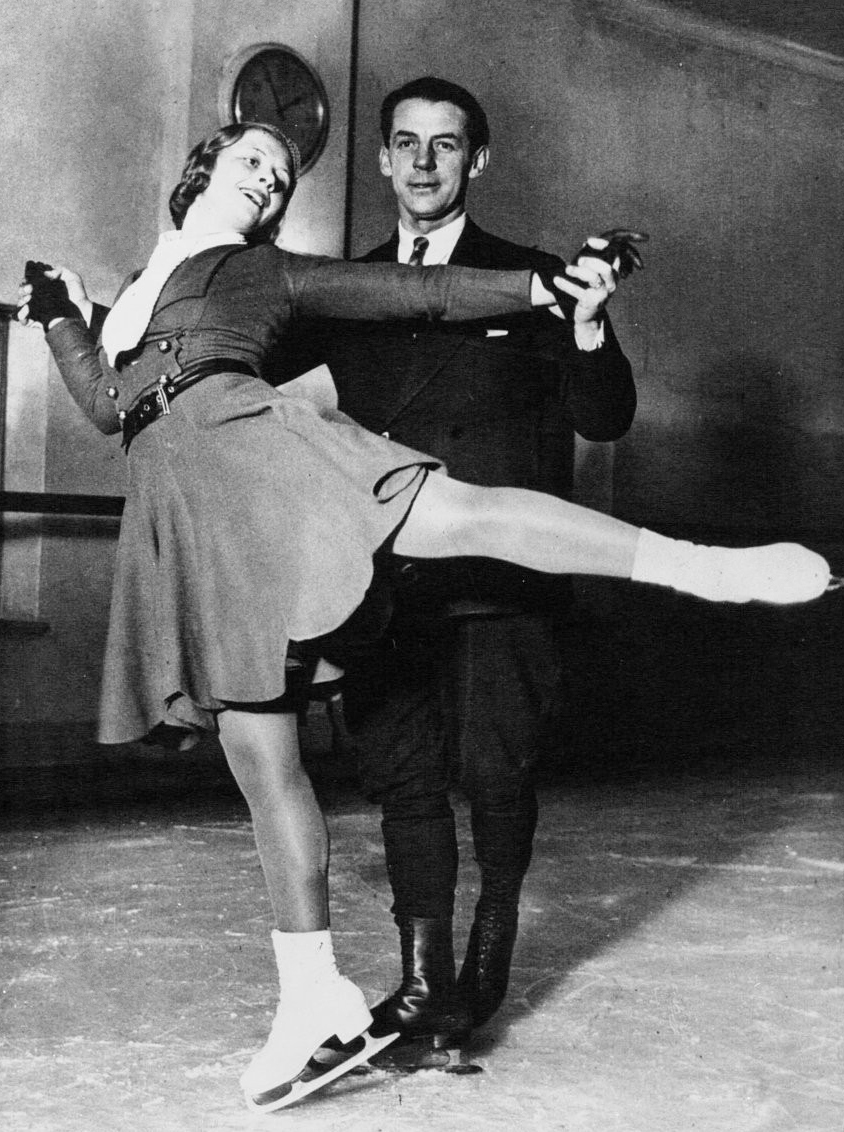
- Melitta Brunner with Paul Kreckow in 1932

Personal information
- Born: 28 January 1907 Vienna, Austria-Hungary
- Died: 26 May 2003 (aged 96) Philadelphia, Pennsylvania, United States
- Height: 1.64 m (5 ft 4 1/2 in)

Figure skating career
- Partner: Ludwig Wrede
- Skating club: WEV, Wien
- Retired: 1930
Medal record
Representing Austria
Olympic Games
Bronze medal – third place	1928 St. Moritz	Pairs
World Championships
Silver medal – second place	1929 Budapest	Pairs
Silver medal – second place	1930 New York	Pairs
Bronze medal – third place	1929 Budapest	Singles

Melitta Kreckow Brunner (née Brunner; 28 January 1907 – 26 May 2003) was an Austrian figure skater. As a singles skater, she came in second place at the Austrian National Championships between 1926 and 1930. At the Worlds Championships, she came in fifth place in 1928, third place in 1929, and fifth place in 1930. Competing in pairs with Ludwig Wrede, she won a silver medal at the Austrian Nationals in 1928, a bronze medal in 1929, and a gold medal in 1930. They came in third place at the 1928 Winter Olympics. They also came in third place at 1928 Worlds and second place at the 1929 and 1939 Worlds.

After retiring from competitions Brunner taught skating in Switzerland and Great Britain. In December 1932 she married Paul Kreckow, a German figure skater from Berlin. They married in London, where they were giving skating demonstrations. After World War II, Brunner performed in ice shows in Europe, and then immigrated to the United States. There she continued skating, and coached skaters into her nineties.

== Competitive highlights ==
=== Ladies' singles ===
International
Event	1926	1927	1928	1929	1930
Winter Olympics			7th		
World Championships			5th	3rd	5th
National
Austrian Championships	2nd	2nd	2nd	2nd	2nd

=== Pairs with Ludwig Wrede ===
International
Event	1922	1923	1924	1928	1929	1930
Winter Olympics				3rd		
World Championships				3rd	2nd	2nd
National
Austrian Championships	3rd	1st	2nd		3rd	1st
