= Dennis Silverthorne =

British figure skater

Personal information
- Full name: Winifred Ellen "Winnie" Silverthorne
- Other names: Winnie
- Born: 1 February 1923 Brighton, England
- Died: 2 January 2004 (aged 80) London, Ontario, Canada

Figure skating career
- Country: Great Britain
- Partner: Winifred Silverthorne (former)
Medal record
Representing United Kingdom
Pairs Figure skating
European Championships
Silver medal – second place	1947 Davos	Pairs

Dennis Alfred Silverthorne (1 February 1923 in Brighton, England – 2 January 2004 in London, Ontario, Canada) was a British pair skater who competed with his sister Winifred Silverthorne. The pair won the silver medal at the 1947 European Figure Skating Championships and finished fourth at that year's World Figure Skating Championships. They then finished fifth at the 1948 Winter Olympics and sixth at that year's World Championships.

After his competitive career, Silverthorne moved to Canada and became a coach. Most notable among his students was 1963 World Champion Donald McPherson. Silverthorne was inducted into the Skate Canada Hall of Fame in 2006.

== Results ==
(with Silverthorne)

Event	1947	1948
Winter Olympics		5th
World Championships	4th	6th
European Championships	2nd	
