= Four skating =

Discipline of figure skating

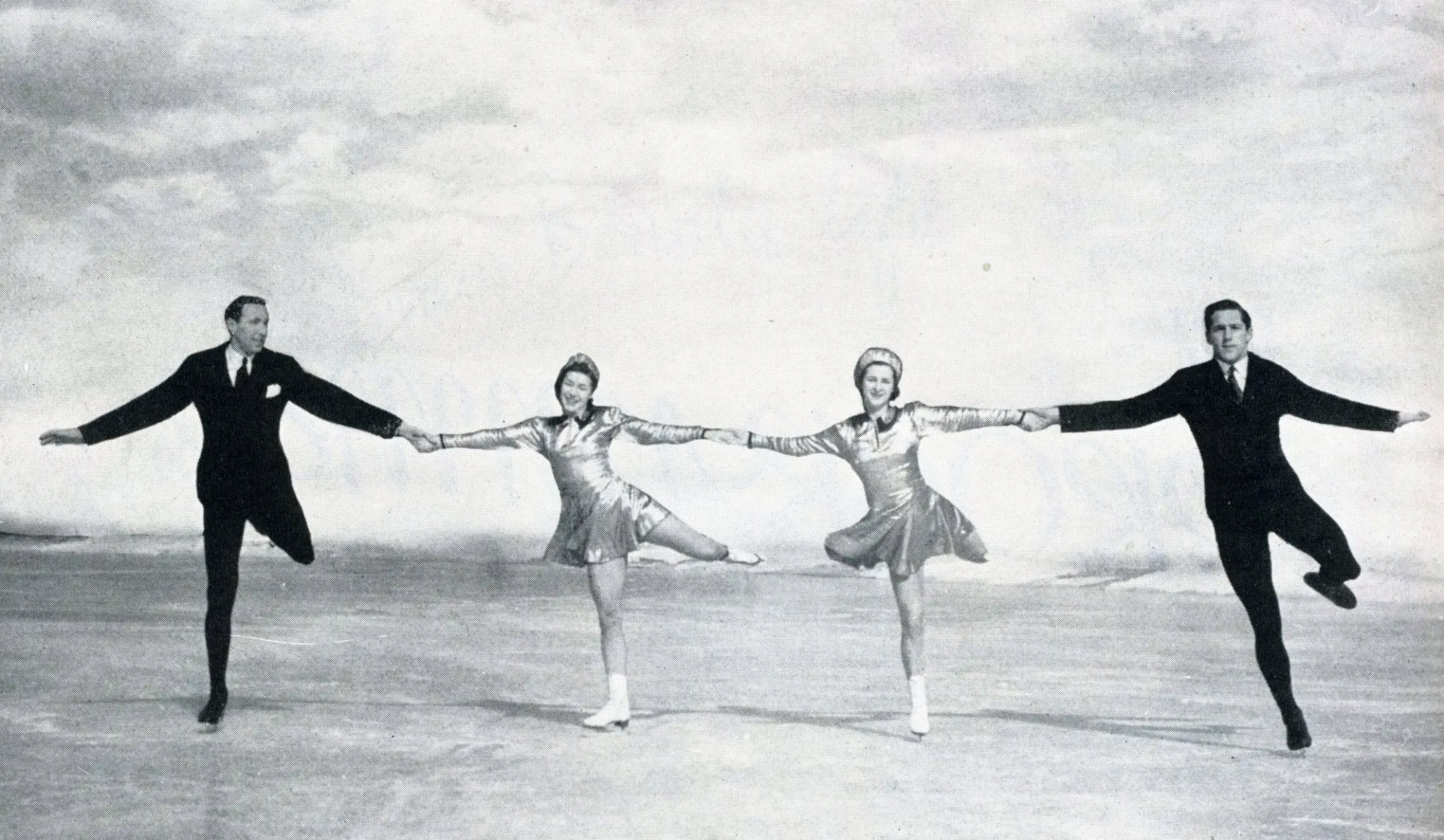
A four skating group in 1939 - from left, Montgomery Wilson, Hazel Caley, Dorothy Caley, and Ralph McCreath

Four skating is a figure skating and artistic roller skating discipline that has been primarily competed in Canada and to a lesser extent in the United States. Fours teams consist of two women and two men. The discipline is similar to pair skating, with elements including overhead lifts, twist lifts, death spirals, and throw jumps, as well as the elements of single skating in unison, pairs elements in unison and unique elements that involve all four skaters.

== History ==
The discipline grew out of the English practice of "combined-skating", which was first tried in the 1770s and further developed in the first half of the 1800s. In combined-skating, two to nine skaters performed figures around a central point, upon which they would converge as they performed the same movements. Pairs of skaters began each figure opposite each other, with every pair - or a single skater when there were odd numbers of participants - starting the figure slightly later than the pair before them to avoid collisions. This practice made its way to Canada and the United States.

Four skating began in Canada in about 1908 and began to be contested in the Canadian Figure Skating Championships in 1914. In its earliest years, it consisted of skaters performing compulsory figures in unison, as in combined-skating, before evolving into free skating performances of four skaters. As in synchronized skating, unison between skaters remained important, and skaters were encouraged to do elements both in pairs and synchronized as a group as well as changing partners throughout the program.

The first figure skating competition between Canadian and American teams took place in 1913. It was also held at the North American Figure Skating Championships in 1923 and then again from 1933 through 1941. A fours competition was also held at the 1924 U.S. Figure Skating Championships.

Four events were held annually at the Canadian Championships through 1942 and sporadically thereafter until 1984, when it was held annually again until 1997, after which it was discontinued. They were held at the US Championships for several years after World War II. Fours was also included at Skate Canada International in 1989 and 1990; both years featured one American and two Canadian teams, and a West German team also competed in 1990. Sporadic events were also held in Germany and the Soviet Union.

Over the years, the four skating competitions were attended at national level by world-class skaters such as the Americans Theresa Weld and Hayes Alan Jenkins, and the Canadians Constance Wilson-Samuel, Montgomery Wilson and Isabelle Brasseur and Lloyd Eisler.

== Elements ==
Four skating groups often began a performance by skating from each corner of the rink to meet in the center, then breaking into pairs to perform a few simple opening movements. Most of the program consisted of jumps, spins, spirals, turns, and spread eagles. The inclusion of pair dancing was often avoided because it could lead to the performance being broken into two pairs rather than one group of four, and it emphasized differences in speed between the skaters.

Maribel Vinson suggested a number of different elements for groups, including skating in various formations with the skaters holding on to each other in different ways, skating dances in unison as a group, switching off partners quickly, lifts, patterns where skaters moved together and apart or passed through each other's lines, and synchronized patterns and jumps in the center performed as a group or in sets of two pairs. She wrote that the group had to skate at the level of the weakest skater and elements should only be included it all four skaters could perform it with the same skill and rhythm.

During the revival period in the late 1980s and 1990s, groups created new movements, such as having one man perform a lift with one of the women and then pass her on to the other man or death spirals with the two women on different edges.
