= Norman M. Scott =

Canadian figure skater

Norman Scott
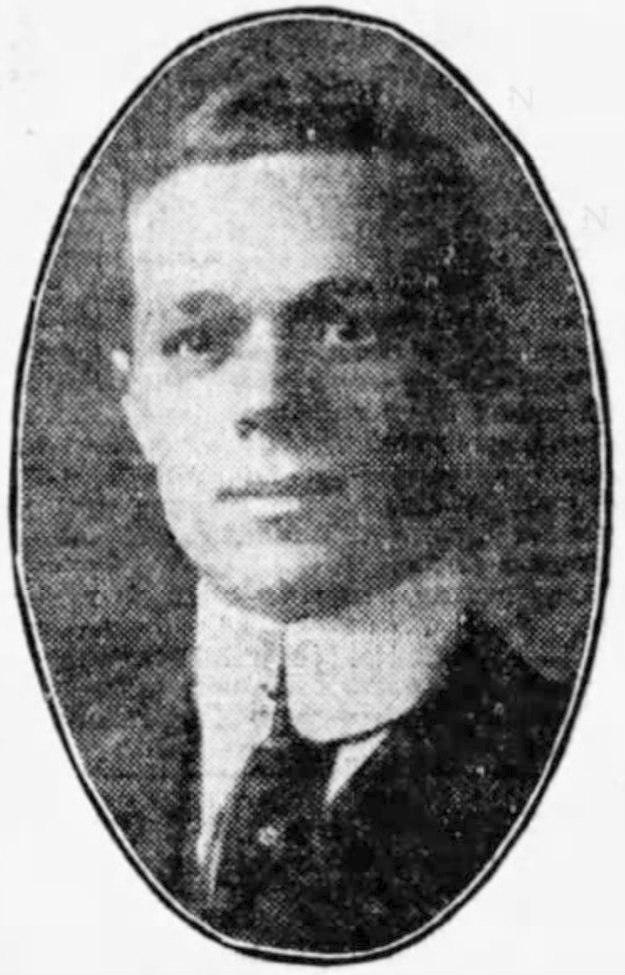
- Scott c. 1913

Personal information
- Born: March 19, 1892 Ottawa, Ontario
- Died: October 2, 1981 (aged 89) Montreal, Quebec

Figure skating career
- Country: Canada
- Partner: Jeanne Chevalier
- Skating club: Winter Club of Montreal

Norman Mackie Scott (March 19, 1892 – October 2, 1981) was a Canadian a figure skater who competed in both single skating and pair skating.

== Biography ==
Norman Scott's pairs partner in figure skating was Jeanne Chevalier. As a single skater, he is the 1914 and 1920 Canadian champion. He and Chevalier won the 1914 Canadian pairs title. Scott was part of the four teams that won the silver medal in the Canadian fours championships in 1913.

Scott also competed in the United States and won the first United States Figure Skating Championships in both singles and pairs.

While attending McGill University in Montreal Scott played on the school ice hockey team and was a member of the 1911–12 Canadian intercollegiate championship team. He had previously also played hockey in the Ottawa City Hockey League. While still in his teens he was said to have been given a big offer to join the Ottawa Senators of the National Hockey Association.

Outside of figure skating and ice hockey Scott was also a competitive golf player, representing the Royal Ottawa Golf Club.

During World War I he saw active combat in France with the Royal Air Force.

== Results ==
men's singles

Event	1913	1914	1920	1921
Canadian Championships	2nd	1st	1st	1st
U.S. Championships		1st		

pairs with Chevalier

Event	1913	1914
Canadian Championships	2nd	1st
U.S. Championships		1st
