= Roger Turner (figure skater) =

American figure skater

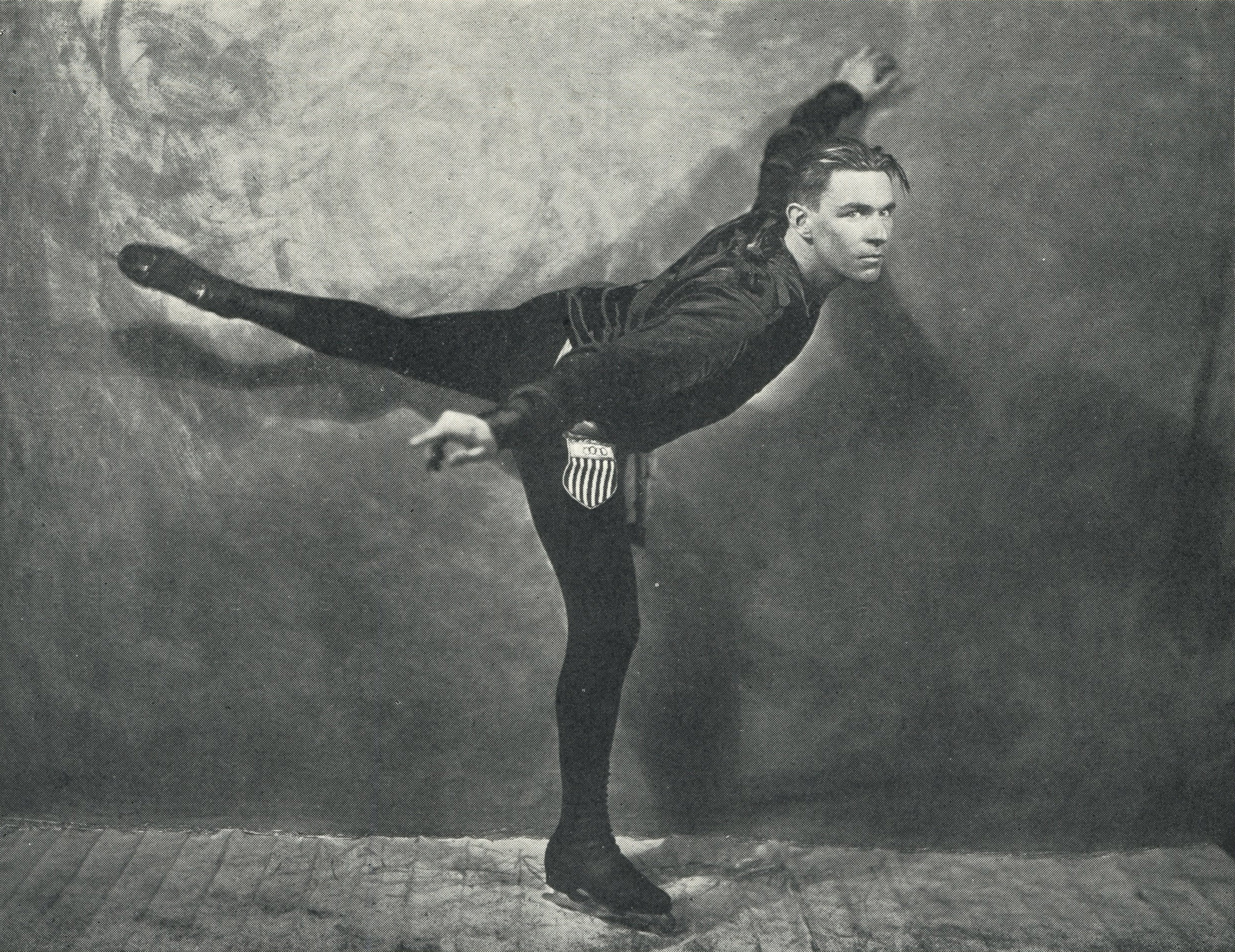
- Turner around 1928

Personal information
- Full name: Roger Felix Turner
- Born: March 3, 1901 Milton, Massachusetts
- Died: October 29, 1993 (aged 92) Walpole, Massachusetts

Figure skating career
- Country: United States
- Skating club: SC of Boston
Medal record
Representing United States
Men's Figure skating
World Championships
Silver medal – second place	1930 New York	Men's singles
Silver medal – second place	1931 Berlin	Men's singles
North American Championships
Silver medal – second place	1929 Boston	Men's singles
Silver medal – second place	1937 Boston	Men's singles

Roger Felix Turner (March 3, 1901 – October 29, 1993) was an American figure skater.

He was born in Milton, Massachusetts and died in Walpole, Massachusetts.

Turner was the seven-time (1928–1934) U.S. National Champion and two-time (1930–1931) World silver medalist. He is tied with Dick Button for having the most consecutive wins at the U.S. Championships (men's singles). Turner was inducted into the United States Figure Skating Hall of Fame in 1994. He was a member of the Skating Club of Boston.

At the 1928 Winter Olympics he finished tenth in the singles competition. Four years later at the Lake Placid Games he finished sixth in the singles event.

== Results ==
=== Men's singles ===
Event	1926	1927	1928	1929	1930	1931	1932	1933	1934	1935	1936	1937
Winter Olympic Games			10th				6th					
World Championships			5th		2nd	2nd	5th					
North American Championships				2nd								2nd
U.S. Championships	1st J	2nd	1st	1st	1st	1st	1st	1st	1st	2nd	4th	

=== Pairs ===
(with Polly Blodgett)

Event	1936
U.S. Championships	2nd
