= Gertrude Meredith =

American figure skater

Gertrude Helen Meredith (born May 28, 1892, in Yorkton, Northwest Territories, Canada; died February 24, 1986, in New York, New York) was an American pair skater who competed with Joseph Savage. They won the bronze medal at the United States Figure Skating Championships in 1932 and 1933 and finished in last place out of seven pairs in the 1932 Winter Olympic Games.

== Results ==
(pairs with Joseph Savage)

Event	1932	1933
Winter Olympic Games	7th	
U.S. Championships	3rd	3rd

(ladies singles)

Event	1925
U.S. Championships	3rd J
