= Joseph Savage =

American figure skater (1879–1956)

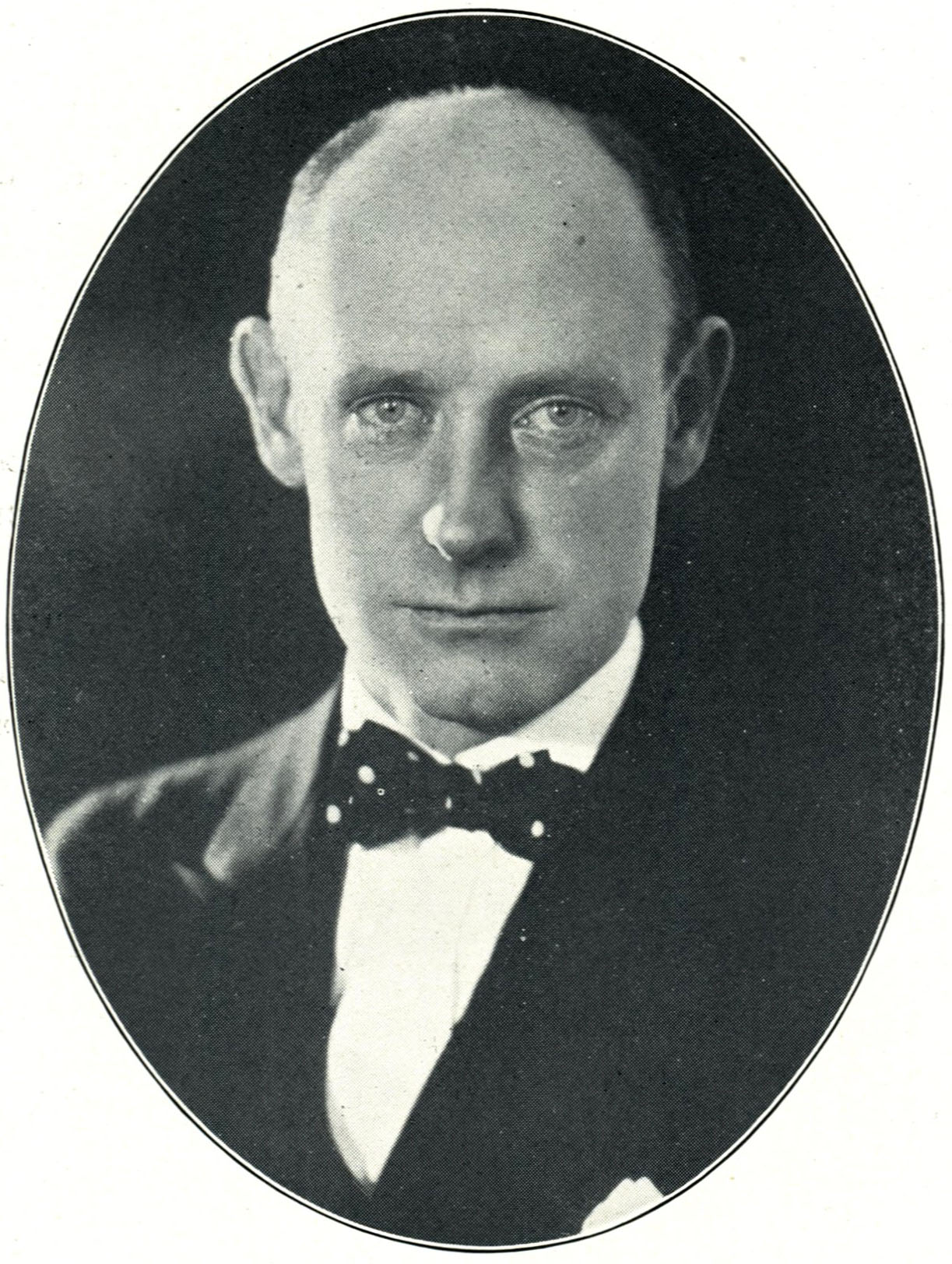
- Savage around 1930

Personal information
- Born: May 21, 1879
- Died: March 10, 1956 (aged 76)

Figure skating career
- Country: United States
Medal record
Representing United States
Fours' Figure skating
North American Championships
Bronze medal – third place	1939 Toronto	Fours

Joseph Knebel Savage (May 21, 1879 in New York, New York – March 10, 1956 in Asbury Park, New Jersey) was an American figure skater who competed in pairs and ice dance. Teamed with Edith Secord, he won the bronze medal in pairs at the United States Figure Skating Championships in 1929 and 1930 and finished eighth at the 1930 World Figure Skating Championships. He then teamed with Gertrude Meredith, capturing two more bronze medals at the U.S. Championships in 1932 and 1933 and finishing seventh out of seven pairs at the 1932 Winter Olympic Games (when Savage was 52 years old).

Savage later switched disciplines to ice dance and teamed with Marjorie Parker to win the first official United States championship in 1936. After he and Parker won a silver medal at the 1937 nationals, he joined forces with partner Katherine Durbrow to win another silver in 1938. The following year, he and Nettie Prantell finished second at the U.S. Championships. He later re-teamed with Parker, and the duo won a silver medal at the 1943 Nationals, at which time Savage was 63.

Savage was also an administrator in several figure skating organizations. Away from the ice, he was an attorney.

== Results ==
=== Men's singles ===
National
Event	1925	1926	1927	1928	1929	1930	1931
U.S. Champ.	2nd J	2nd J	7th J	4th J	2nd J		1st J
J = Junior

=== Pairs ===
(with Secord)

Event	1929	1930
World Championships		8th
U.S. Championships	3rd	3rd

(with Meredith)

Event	1932	1933
Winter Olympic Games	7th	
U.S. Championships	3rd	3rd

=== Ice Dance ===
(with Parker)

Event	1936	1937	1943
U.S. Championships	1st	2nd	2nd

(with Durbrow)

Event	1938
U.S. Championships	2nd

(with Prantell)

Event	1939
U.S. Championships	2nd

=== Fours ===
(with Nettie Prantel, Marjorie Parker, and George Boltres)

Event	1939
North American Championships	3rd
