= Montgomery Wilson =

Canadian figure skater (1909–1964)

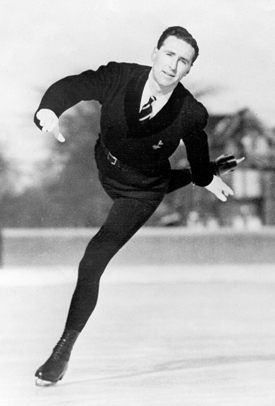

Personal information
- Born: August 20, 1909 Toronto, Canada
- Died: November 15, 1964 (aged 55) Lincoln, Massachusetts, U.S.
- Height: 182 cm (6 ft 0 in)

Figure skating career
- Country: Canada
- Skating club: Toronto Skating Club
- Retired: 1939
Medal record
Representing Canada
Single skating
Olympic Games
Bronze medal – third place	1932 Lake Placid	Men's singles
World Championships
Silver medal – second place	1932 Montreal	Men's singles
North American Championships
Gold medal – first place	1939 Toronto	Men's singles
Gold medal – first place	1937 Boston	Men's singles
Gold medal – first place	1935 Montreal	Men's singles
Gold medal – first place	1933 New York	Men's singles
Gold medal – first place	1931 Ottawa	Men's singles
Gold medal – first place	1929 Boston	Men's singles
Bronze medal – third place	1927 Toronto	Men's singles
Pair skating
North American Championships
Silver medal – second place	1935 Montreal	Pairs
Gold medal – first place	1933 New York	Pairs
Gold medal – first place	1931 Ottawa	Pairs
Gold medal – first place	1929 Boston	Pairs
Bronze medal – third place	1927 Toronto	Pairs
North American Championships
Four skating
Gold medal – first place	1939 Toronto	Fours
Silver medal – second place	1933 New York	Fours

William Stewart Montgomery "Bud" Wilson (August 20, 1909 – November 15, 1964) was a Canadian figure skater. Competing in singles, he became the 1932 Olympic bronze medallist, the 1932 World silver medallist, a six-time North American champion, and a nine-time Canadian national champion.

== Personal life ==
Wilson was born in Toronto in 1909. During World War II, he was a Major in the army artillery, earning the Bronze Star. He died in 1964 at the age of 55 from throat cancer.

== Career ==
Wilson first entered the Canadian Championships in 1924 at the age of 13 and placed second. He would win nine senior national titles between 1929 and 1939. In 1932, he won the silver medal at the World Figure Skating Championships and the bronze medal at the Winter Olympics in singles.

Wilson also competed in pair skating with his sister Constance Wilson-Samuel. Together, they won numerous Canadian and North American championships.

Wilson turned professional in 1939 and began his teaching career in St. Paul, Minnesota, where he stayed until interrupted by World War II. Following his army service, he joined the Skating Club of Boston as the club's senior professional and director of its annual carnival, The Ice Chips. He coached the following skaters:

- Dudley Richards, U.S. pair skating champion, World and Olympic competitor
- Bradley Lord, U.S. men's singles champion and World competitor
- Gregory Kelley, U.S. men's singles silver medallist and World competitor
- Tina Noyes, U.S. national medallist, Olympic and World competitor

Wilson was inducted into the World Figure Skating Museum and Hall of Fame (1976), Skate Canada Hall of Fame (1990), Professional Skaters Association Coaches Hall of Fame (2003), and Canadian Olympic Hall of Fame (2007).

== Results ==
=== Men's singles ===
International
Event	1924	1925	1926	1927	1928	1929	1930	1931	1932	1933	1934	1935	1936	1937	1938	1939
Winter Olympics					13th				3rd				4th			
World Champ.					7th		4th		2nd				5th			
North American Champ.				3rd		1st		1st		1st		1st		1st		1st
National
Canadian Champ.	2nd	3rd	2nd	2nd		1st	1st	1st	1st	1st	1st	1st			1st	1st

=== Pairs with Wilson-Samuel ===
International
Event	1927	1928	1929	1930	1931	1932	1933	1934	1935
Winter Olympics						5th			
World Championships				4th		6th			
North American Championships	3rd		1st		1st		1st		2nd
National
Canadian Championships	2nd		1st	1st	2nd	1st	1st	1st	3rd

=== Fours ===
(with Dorothy Caley, Hazel Caley, and Ralph McCreath)

International
Event	1939
North American Championships	1st

(with Constance Wilson-Samuel, Elizabeth Fisher, and Hubert Sprott)

International
Event	1933
North American Championships	2nd
