= Maribel Vinson =

American figure skater (1911–1961)

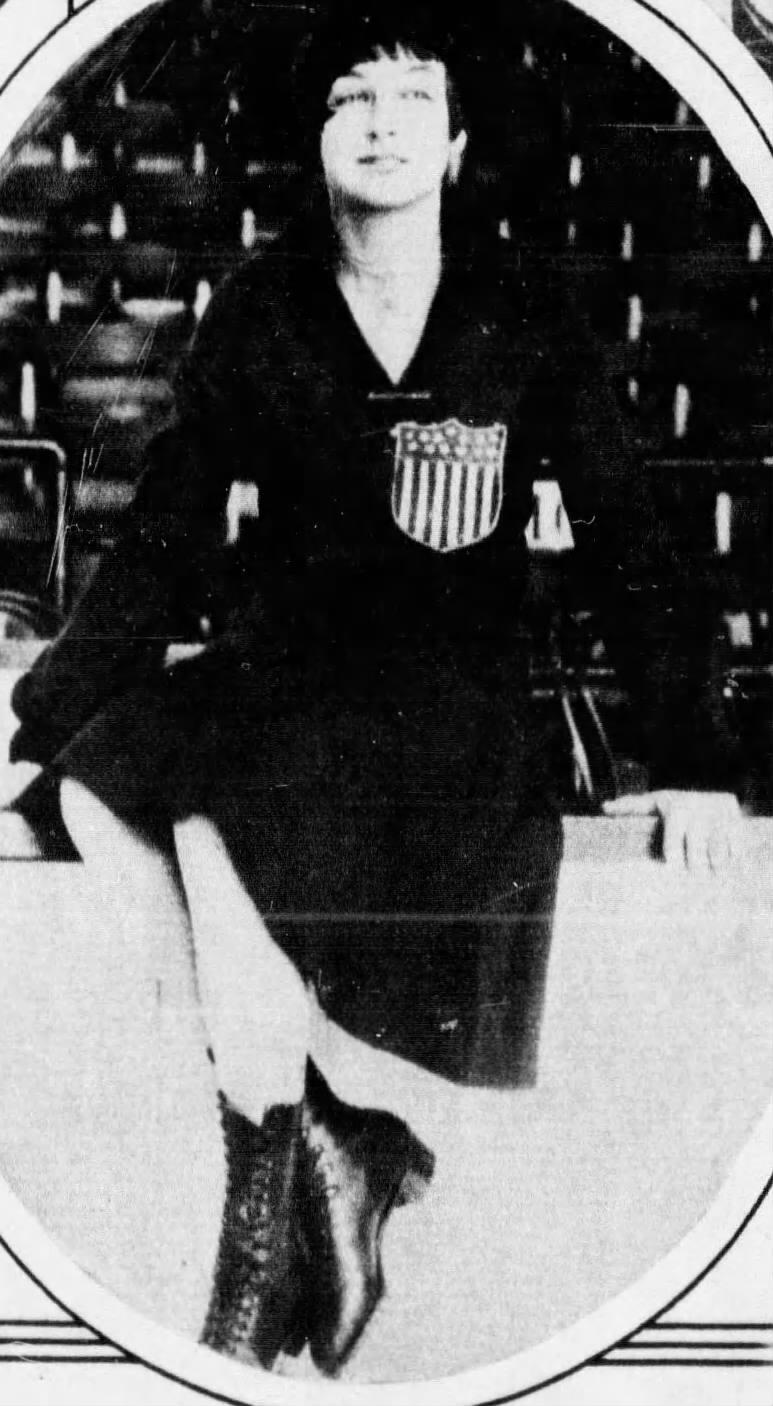
- Vinson in 1927

Personal information
- Born: Maribel Yerxa Vinson; October 12, 1911 Winchester, Massachusetts, U.S.
- Died: February 15, 1961 (aged 49) Berg-Kampenhout, Flemish Brabant, Belgium
- Cause of death: Plane crash

Figure skating career
- Skating club: SC of Boston
- Retired: 1937
Medal record
Representing the United States
Ladies' figure skating
Olympic Games
| Bronze medal – third place | 1932 Lake Placid | Ladies' singles |
World Championships
| Bronze medal – third place | 1930 New York | Ladies' singles |
| Silver medal – second place | 1928 London | Ladies' singles |
European Championships
| Bronze medal – third place | 1934 Prague | Ladies' singles |
North American Championships
| Gold medal – first place | 1937 Boston | Ladies' singles |
| Silver medal – second place | 1935 Montreal | Ladies' singles |
| Silver medal – second place | 1929 Boston | Ladies' singles |
Pairs figure skating
North American Championships
| Silver medal – second place | 1937 Boston | Pairs |
| Gold medal – first place | 1935 Montreal | Pairs |
| Bronze medal – third place | 1929 Boston | Pairs |

Maribel Yerxa Vinson Owen (née Vinson; October 12, 1911 – February 15, 1961) was an American figure skater and coach. She competed in the disciplines of ladies' singles and pair skating. As a singles skater, she was the 1932 Olympic bronze medalist, a two-time World medalist (1928 silver, 1930 bronze), the 1937 North American champion, and a nine-time U.S. national champion. As a pair skater, she was the 1935 North American champion and four-time national champion with George Hill. She also won two national titles with Thornton Coolidge. She was the first female sportswriter at The New York Times, and continued competing and winning medals while working as a full-time reporter.

Vinson is tied with Michelle Kwan for the record in U.S. ladies' figure skating titles.

== Personal life ==
Maribel Yerxa Vinson was the daughter and only child of Thomas Vinson and Gertrude Cliff Vinson of Winchester, Massachusetts. Both of Vinson's parents were figure skaters and Vinson was made an honorary member of the Cambridge Skating Club at birth. She came from a privileged social background. Her mother, Gertrude Vinson, had progressive ideas and homeschooled Vinson until she was nine. She spent much of her childhood skating.

A good student, Vinson studied at her mother's alma mater, Radcliffe College, and graduated in 1933, all the while pursuing an interest in ice skating. She married Canadian skater Guy Owen in 1938 and they had two daughters, Maribel Yerxa Owen, born in 1940 in Boston, and Laurence Rochon Owen, born in 1944 in Oakland, California

They moved to Berkeley in the early 1940s. During World War II, Guy Owen worked at a shipyard during the day and taught ice skating to students after hours. The couple turned professional, earning a living as performers with ice skating shows such as the International Ice Skate Revue before setting up their own show. Their two daughters stayed with their maternal grandparents in Winchester, Massachusetts while their parents toured in 1945.

Conflict arose in the marriage by the late 1940s. Guy Owen was somewhat shy; Maribel Vinson was loud, extroverted and had a dominant personality. Vinson complained to one of her students about Owen's excessive drinking. Owen found show business, life on the road, and long separations from his family stressful. Owen and Vinson divorced in 1949 and Owen moved to Washington. He was visiting his parents in Ottawa when he was rushed to the hospital with severe abdominal pain in April 1952. He died of a perforated ulcer at age 38. Vinson and their daughters were not mentioned in his obituary. It is not known whether Vinson and their daughters attended Owen's funeral Mass.

Following her father's death, also in 1952, Vinson and her daughters moved back east to Winchester and lived with her mother. In February 1961, Maribel Vinson was killed along with both daughters in the Sabena Flight 548 crash in Belgium.

== Competitive career ==
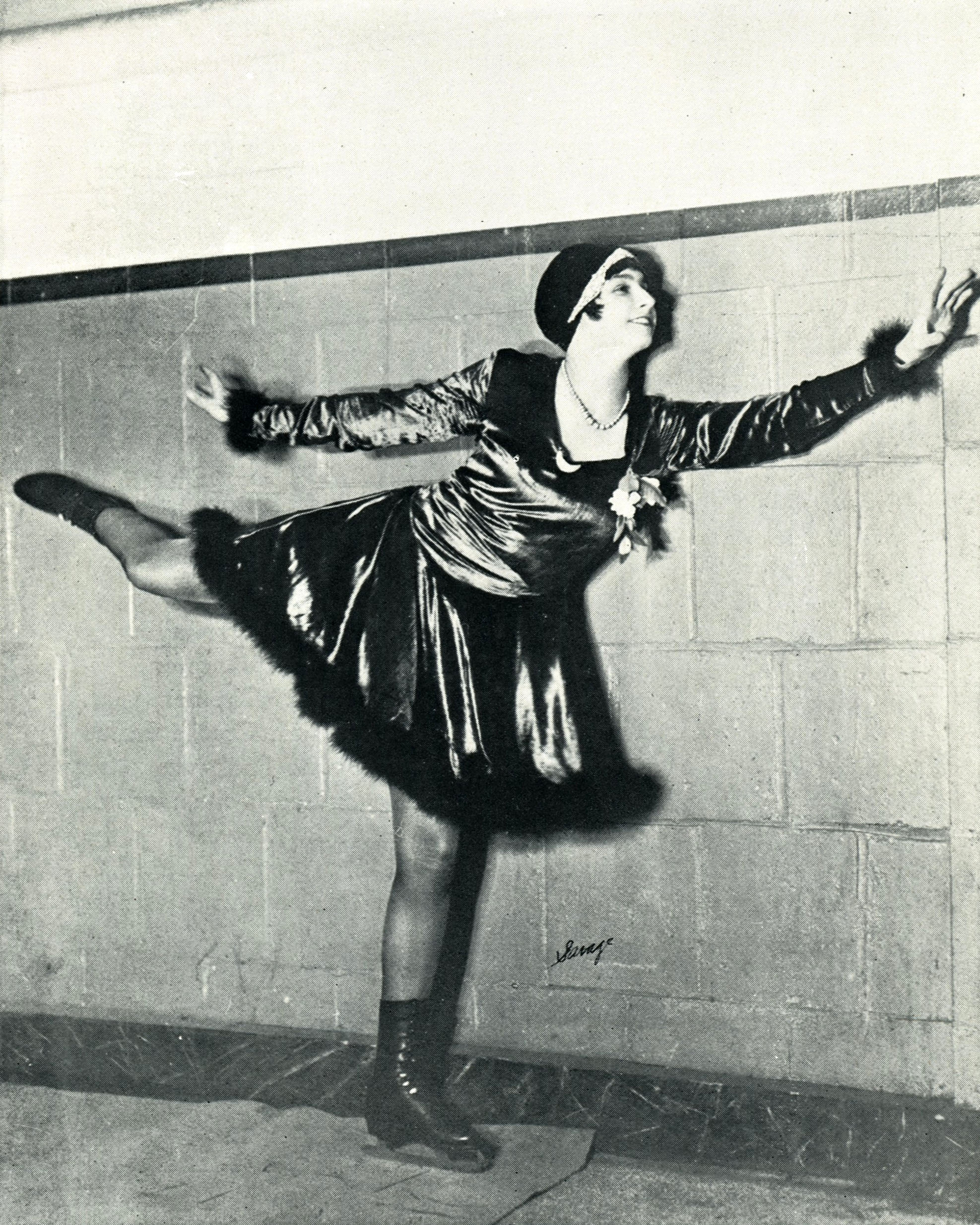
Vinson around 1930

Vinson began to take lessons with coach Willie Frick at the Boston Arena at the age of nine. She won the U.S. junior ladies' title at the age of 12.

From 1928 to 1937, Vinson won the women's singles title at the U.S. Championships every year except for 1934. She also teamed up with Thornton L. Coolidge to win the U.S. pairs' title in 1928 and 1929, and with George E. B. Hill to win four titles in 1933, 1935, 1936, and 1937.

At the 1932 Winter Olympic Games in Lake Placid, New York, Vinson earned the bronze medal behind the Norwegian champion Sonja Henie and the Austrian runner up, Fritzi Burger. While still competing, in the 1930s, Vinson became the first woman sportswriter at the New York Times newspaper. She covered sports such as fencing, golf, track, tennis, swimming, squash, badminton, lacrosse and horse shows between 1934 and 1937. Her male colleagues discovered that she could outdrink them.

Following her retirement from amateur ice skating, Vinson toured professionally with Owen in shows. They married in 1938.

== Coaching career ==
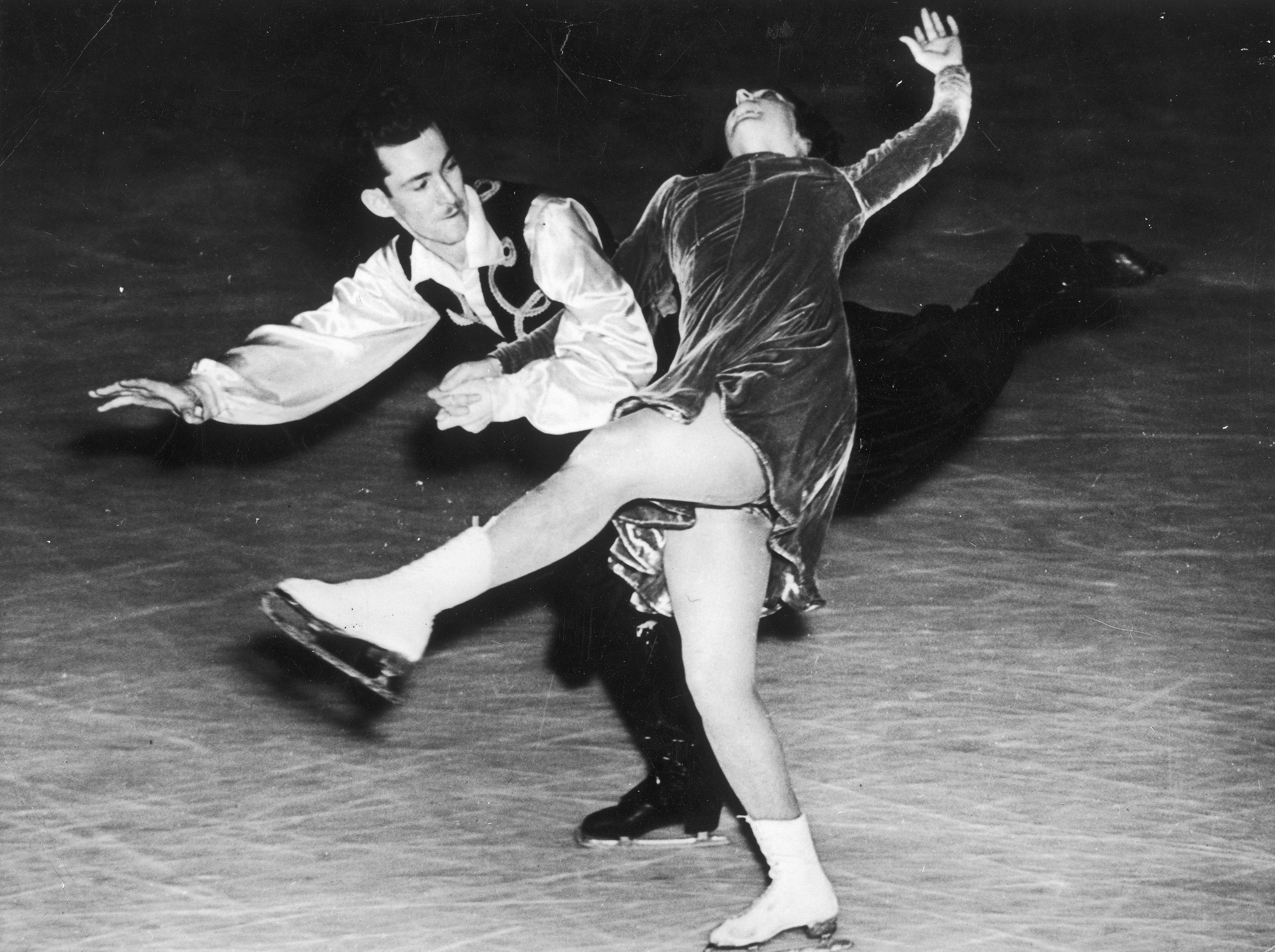
Guy Owen and Maribel Vinson are pictured during a performance in Canada in 1936.

Following the birth of her two daughters, Vinson began coaching in Berkeley, California.

Vinson and her daughters moved back east to the Boston area in 1952, where they lived with her recently widowed mother in Winchester. She coached at rinks in the Boston area. Her daughters developed a love for ice skating and she trained them in the sport.

Vinson coached Tenley Albright to five U.S. titles and then to the United States' first Olympic gold medal in ladies' singles. She also taught Frank Carroll, who himself went on to be one of America's top skating instructors, coaching Michelle Kwan to her numerous world and national titles and Evan Lysacek to his Olympic gold medal.

Vinson was an assertive, outspoken woman and a demanding coach who set high expectations for her daughters and for all of her students both on and off the ice. She gave her students rides to and from the skating rink and encouraged them to work on schoolwork and test preparation during the commute. She was also both physically and verbally violent. She often swore, a habit which violated the social standards of the time. Her mother, Gertrude Vinson, often watched skating practices and scolded Vinson for cursing by saying "Must thou blaspheme?" On one occasion, Vinson pulled a student's ponytail and the girl fell on the ice and broke her wrist. Vinson also scolded her students and swatted their buttocks with blade guards. She once struck her student, Carroll, in the face with her skate guard and left a welt because she thought he had been disrespectful. She struck Ron Ludington, another student, in the back of the head with a wooden folding chair when he swore at her. They later reconciled over a couple of beers.

At one skating competition, she threw a chair towards a judge when she disagreed with the scoring. At another, she physically tussled with another coach over the needle on a record player and which skater's music would be played first. Ludington compared her to Auntie Mame and said she molded all of her students. She took her students to plays and instructed them to observe how the actors expressed themselves physically. She also exposed them to cultural activities and proper social etiquette to enhance their skating performances. Her students loved her and were afraid of her. Many also viewed her as a mother figure.

Vinson coached an African American student at a time when racial prejudice made this unacceptable. She taught the student free of charge and initially gave her lessons when the rink was closed because the rink manager refused to grant admission to African Americans. The African American student, Mabel Fairbanks, later become a skating coach whose own students won national titles. Vinson Owen sometimes falsely claimed to be Jewish to discourage Anti-Semitic comments around her students.

Vinson was allowed to coach her own daughters early in the morning at the prestigious Figure Skating Club of Boston but was not allowed to coach other students there. This meant she had to rent ice time at rinks all over the Boston area and commute from rink to rink. She drove with her skates on and kept a hectic schedule. She could not understand why a coach with as many titles as she held was denied a full-time coaching position. Other skating coaches might have objected to her demeanor and approach to coaching.

She also clashed with her daughters on and off the ice. Former students recalled that young Maribel once swore at her mother during a lesson and Vinson made her older daughter kneel on the ice and beg forgiveness of God. On another occasion, she yelled at Laurence during a lesson and chased Laurence around the rink when Laurence stuck her fingers in her ears and pretended not to hear her mother. Laurence hid from her mother in the bathroom. The younger Maribel was under so much stress that she, like her father, developed an ulcer.

During her lifetime, Vinson Owen authored several books on her sport:

- Primer of Figure Skating – McGraw-Hill/Whittlesey House (1938)
- Advanced Figure Skating – McGraw-Hill/Whittlesey House (1940)
- The Fun of Figure Skating – Harper & Brothers (1960)

In Primer of Figure Skating, Vinson devotes three-and-a-half pages to what female figure skaters should wear on the ice, which included the correct length and style of skirt, and credits the appeal of the sport to feminine interests in skating fashions. Figure skating historian and writer Ellyn Kestnbaum argues that "Vinson points to several ways in which skating attire connotes (and permits) athleticism and also how it can attract the eye on the merits of its own design elements and by enhancing the visual appeal of the skater's body". Kestnbaum also stated that female skaters should pay more attention to their appearance than men do. Consumed by her coaching career, Vinson paid little attention to what she wore off the ice and had no time to devote to housekeeping either.

At the 1961 U.S. Championships, her daughter and namesake, Maribel, won the national pair skating title with partner Dudley S. Richards, while her youngest daughter, 16-year-old Laurence, won the ladies' single title. It was the first time CBS broadcast the U.S. national championships on television and the Owen family became instant celebrities.

== Plane crash ==
Vinson, as a coach, and her two daughters, as competitors, were all part of the United States team scheduled to appear at the 1961 World Championships in Prague, Czechoslovakia. They boarded Sabena Flight 548 at New York City's Idlewild International Airport along with the rest of the American team. The overnight flight had a stopover scheduled for Brussels, Belgium and on its arrival in the clear mid-morning of February 15, the captain had to abort the approach and circle around for a second attempt to land on a different runway. The plane, a Boeing 707, never made it back to the airport; instead, it plunged into the wooded farmland of the village of Berg, Belgium, taking the lives of all 72 passengers and crew plus a farmer at work in his fields. All 18 members of the American figure skating team plus 16 of their relatives, friends, and coaches were among the dead.

The 1961 World Championships were canceled. When her mother, Gertrude Vinson, was informed of the plane crash, she said it was just as well they died together as Vinson and her daughters would not have wanted to live without each other. A memorial service for Vinson and her two daughters was held February 25, 1961 at the Episcopal Church of the Epiphany in Winchester. The remains of Vinson Owen and her daughters were brought home for interment in the Story Chapel Columbarium at Mount Auburn Cemetery in Cambridge, Massachusetts.

== Legacy ==
Gertrude Vinson stayed active in the skating association following the plane crash. She tried to encourage the young skaters and offer advice to them that her daughter would have given. She was known as "Grammy" to the skaters in the club, who helped care for her following the loss of her family. She was interred beside her daughter and granddaughters following her own death in 1969.

Vinson Owen was inducted into the U.S. Figure Skating Hall of Fame three times – in 1976 as a singles' skater, in 1994 with George E.B. Hill in the pairs' category, and in 2011 as a coach for the 1961 World Team. In 2001, she was inducted to the inaugural class of the Professional Skaters' Association Coaches Hall of Fame, which included the five coaches that perished beside her. In 2002, she was inducted in the World Figure Skating Hall of Fame. Her daughters were inducted into the U.S. Figure Skating Hall of Fame in 2011 as part of the 1961 U.S. World Team.

In Winchester, the Vinson-Owen elementary school was named in her and her daughters' honor.

== Competitive highlights ==
=== Single skating ===
| Event | 1924 | 1926 | 1927 | 1928 | 1929 | 1930 | 1931 | 1932 | 1933 | 1934 | 1935 | 1936 | 1937 |
|---|---|---|---|---|---|---|---|---|---|---|---|---|---|
| Winter Olympics | | | | 4th | | | | 3rd | | | | 5th | |
| World Championships | | | | 2nd | | 3rd | 4th | 4th | | 5th | | | |
| North American Championships | | | | | 2nd | | | | | | 2nd | | 1st |
| European Championships | | | | | | | | | | 3rd | | | |
| U.S. Championships | 1st J | 3rd | 2nd | 1st | 1st | 1st | 1st | 1st | 1st | | 1st | 1st | 1st |

=== Pair skating with Hill ===
| Event | 1930 | 1931 | 1932 | 1933 | 1934 | 1935 | 1936 | 1937 |
|---|---|---|---|---|---|---|---|---|
| Winter Olympic Games | | | | | | | 5th | |
| World Championships | | 5th | | | | | 5th | |
| North American Championships | | | | | | 1st | | 2nd |
| U.S. Championships | 2nd | 2nd | 2nd | 1st | | 1st | 1st | 1st |

=== Pair skating with Coolidge ===
| Event | 1928 | 1929 |
|---|---|---|
| North American Championships | | 3rd |
| U.S. Championships | 1st | 1st |

== See also ==
- Laurence Owen
- Maribel Owen
- Guy Owen
