= 1963 U.S. Figure Skating Championships =

1963 US Figure Skating Championships
- Type: National Championship
- Date: February 7 – 10
- Season: 1962–63
- Location: Long Beach, California
- Venue: Long Beach Arena
- Previous: 1962 U.S. Championships
- Next: 1964 U.S. Championships

The 1963 U.S. Figure Skating Championships was held at the Long Beach Arena in Long Beach, California from January 7–10, 1963. Medals were awarded in three colors: gold (first), silver (second), and bronze (third) in four disciplines – men's singles, ladies singles, pair skating, and ice dancing – across three levels: senior, junior, and novice (singles only).

The event determined the U.S. team for the 1963 World Championships.

== Senior results ==
=== Men ===
Rank	Name
1	Thomas Litz
2	Scott E. Allen
3	Monty Hoyt
4	Gary C. Visconti
5	Buddy Zack
6	David Edwards
7	James W. Short

=== Ladies ===
Rank	Name
1	Lorraine G. Hanlon
2	Christine Haigler
3	Karen Howland
4	Lynn Thomas
5	Myrna Bodek
6	Victoria A. Fisher
7	Carol S. Noir
WD	Frances S. Gold

=== Pairs ===
Rank	Name
1	Judianne Fotheringill / Jerry Fotheringill
2	Vivian Joseph / Ronald Joseph
3	Patti Gustafson / Pieter Kollen

=== Ice dancing (Gold dance) ===
Rank	Name
1	Sally Schantz / Stanley Urban
2	Yvonne N. Littlefield / Peter F. Betts
3	Lorna V. Dyer / John R. Carrell
4	Mary Ann Kavanaugh / King Cole
5	Jo-Anne Leyden / Robert J. Munz

== Junior results ==
=== Men ===
Rank	Name
1	Billy Chapel
2	Richard S. Callaghan
3	Tim Wood
4	Ronnie Frank
5	Robert N. Lubolina
6	Paul McGrath
7	Peter J. Meyer
8	Roy Wagelein
9	Duane Maki

=== Ladies ===
Rank	Name
1	Albertina Noyes
2	Joya Utermohlen
3	Peggy G. Fleming
4	Sondra Lee Holmes
5	Pamela C. Schneider
6	Yvonne Drummond
7	Michele A. Monnier
8	Kristin Mittun
9	Chickie Berlin
10	Maidie Sullivan

=== Pairs ===
Rank	Name
1	Cynthia Kauffman / Ronald Kauffman
2	Yvonne N. Littlefield / Peter F. Betts
3	Joanne Heckert / Gary Clark
4	Barbara Yaggi / Gene Floyd
5	Susan Berens / Robert Sable
6	Sara Beth Rieken / Mac Cummins

=== Ice dancing (Silver dance) ===
Rank	Name
1	
