= 1965 World Figure Skating Championships =

Annual figure skating competition held in 1965

- Type: ISU Championship
- Date: March 2 – 7
- Season: 1964–65
- Location: (United States) Colorado Springs, Colorado USA
- Venue: Broadmoor World Arena

Champions
- Men's singles: (France) Alain Calmat
- Ladies' singles: (Canada) Petra Burka
- Pairs: (Soviet Union) Lyudmila Belousova / Oleg Protopopov
- Ice dance: (Czechoslovakia) Eva Romanová / Pavel Roman
- Previous: 1964 World Championships
- Next: 1966 World Championships

The 1965 World Figure Skating Championships were held in Colorado Springs, Colorado, USA from March 2 to 7. At the event, sanctioned by the International Skating Union, medals were awarded in men's singles, ladies' singles, pair skating, and ice dance.

== Medal table ==
* Host nation (United States)

Rank	Nation	Gold	Silver	Bronze	Total
1	Canada	1	0	1	2
1	France	1	0	1	2
1	Soviet Union	1	0	1	2
4	Czechoslovakia	1	0	0	1
5	United States*	0	2	2	4
6	Austria	0	1	0	1
6	Great Britain	0	1	0	1
Totals (7 entries)		4	4	5	13

== Results ==
=== Men ===
Rank	Name	Places
1	(France) Alain Calmat	9
2	(United States) Scott Allen	27
3	(Canada) Donald Knight	29
4	(Japan) Nobuo Satō	41
5	(Austria) Emmerich Danzer	37
6	(United States) Gary Visconti	48
7	(Austria) Wolfgang Schwarz	72
8	(Austria) Peter Jonas	82
9	(West Germany) Peter Krick	82
10	(France) Robert Dureville	89
11	(West Germany) Sepp Schönmetzler	98
12	(Canada) Jay Humphry	103
13	(United States) Timothy Wood	115
14	(Italy) Giordano Abbondati	121
15	(France) Patrick Péra	138
16	(Czechoslovakia) Ondrej Nepela	149
17	(Soviet Union) Sergey Chetverukhin	151
18	(East Germany) Günter Zöller	156
19	(Hungary) Jenő Ébert	170
20	(United Kingdom) Hywel Evans	173

Judges:

- (Italy) Sonia Bianchetti
- (Czechoslovakia) Zdeněk Fikar
- (Hungary) Ferenc Kertész
- (Austria) Edwin Kucharz
- (Canada) William Lewis
- (United States) Yvonne S. McGowan
- (West Germany) Eugen Romminger
- (France) Néri Valdes
- (Soviet Union) Sergey Vasilyev

=== Ladies ===
Rank	Name	Places
1	(Canada) Petra Burka	9
2	(Austria) Regine Heitzer	23
3	(United States) Peggy Fleming	28
4	(United States) Christine Haigler	30
5	(East Germany) Gabriele Seyfert	55
6	(Japan) Miwa Fukuhara	57
7	(Canada) Valerie Jones	65
8	(France) Nicole Hassler	68
9	(Austria) Helli Sengstschmid	83
10	(United States) Albertina Noyes	96
11	(United Kingdom) Diana Clifton-Peach	97
12	(Japan) Kumiko Ōkawa	100
13	(Czechoslovakia) Hana Mašková	118
14	(Canada) Gloria Tatton	120
15	(Italy) Sandra Brugnera	133
16	(West Germany) Angelika Wagner	147
17	(Soviet Union) Elena Slepova	151
18	(Hungary) Zsuzsa Szentmiklóssy	158

Judges:

- (United Kingdom) Pamela Davis
- (France) Jeanine Donnier-Blanc
- (Austria) Martin Felsenreich
- (Japan) Haruo Konno
- (East Germany) Carla Listing
- (Canada) Ralph McCreath
- (Czechoslovakia) Emil Skákala
- (United States) Jane Sullivan
- (Soviet Union) Tatyana Tolmachova

=== Pairs ===
Rank	Name	Places
1	(Soviet Union) Lyudmila Belousova / Oleg Protopopov	9
2	(United States) Vivian Joseph / Ronald Joseph	19
3	(Soviet Union) Tatyana Zhuk / Aleksandr Gorelik	32
4	(Switzerland) Gerda Johner / Rüdi Johner	39
5	(West Germany) Sonja Pfersdorf / Günther Matzdorf	45
6	(United States) Cynthia Kauffman / Ronald Kauffman	45
7	(Soviet Union) Tatyana Tarasova / Georgiy Proskurin	67
8	(East Germany) Irene Müller / Hans-Georg Dallmer	80
9	(United States) Joanne Heckert / Gary Clark	85
10	(Austria) Gerlinde Schönbauer / Wilhelm Bietak	96
11	(West Germany) Margot Glockshuber / Wolfgang Danne	101
12	(Canada) Alexis Shields / Chris Shields	102
13	(West Germany) Ingrid Bodendorff / Volker Waldeck	112
14	(Canada) Susan Huehnergard / Paul Huehnergard	113

Judges:

- (Italy) Ercole Cattaneo
- (United Kingdom) Pamela Davis
- (United States) H. Janes
- (East Germany) Carla Listing
- (Austria) Walter Malek
- (Canada) Ralph McCreath
- (West Germany) Erika Schiechtl
- (Switzerland) René Schlageter
- (Soviet Union) Tatyana Tolmachova

=== Ice dance ===
Rank	Name	Places
1	(Czechoslovakia) Eva Romanová / Pavel Roman	8
2	(United Kingdom) Janet Sawbridge / David Hickinbottom	18
3	(United States) Lorna Dyer / John Carrell	26
4	(United Kingdom) Diane Towler / Bernard Ford	30
5	(United States) Kristin Fortune / Dennis Sveum	33
6	(United Kingdom) Yvonne Suddick / Roger Kennerson	40
7	(United States) Susan Urban / Stanley Urban	46
8	(Canada) Carole Forrest / Kevin Lethbridge	58
9	(France) Brigitte Martin / Francis Gamichon	66
10	(Hungary) Györgyi Korda / Pál Vásárhelyi	70
11	(Canada) Lynn Matthews / Bryon Topping	75
12	(Austria) Christel Trebesiner / Georg Felsinger	84
13	(West Germany) Gabriele Rauch / Rudi Matysik	88.5
14	(East Germany) Annerose Baier / Eberhard Rüger	93.5

Judges:

- (United Kingdom) Robert S. Hudson
- (Hungary) Ferenc Kertész
- (France) Lysiane Lauret
- (Canada) Dorothy Leamen
- (Austria) Walter Malek
- (United States) M. Ridgely
- (Czechoslovakia) Emil Skákala
