= 1964 U.S. Figure Skating Championships =

- Type: National Championship
- Date: January 10 – 12
- Season: 1963–64
- Location: Cleveland, Ohio
- Venue: Cleveland Arena

Champions
- Men's singles: Scott Allen
- Ladies' singles: Peggy Fleming
- Pairs: Judianne Fotheringill & Jerry Fotheringill
- Ice dance: Darlene Streich & Charles Fetter
- Previous: 1963 US Championships
- Next: 1965 U.S. Championships

The 1964 U.S. Figure Skating Championships was held at the Cleveland Arena in Cleveland, Ohio from January 10–12, 1964. Medals were awarded in three colors: gold (first), silver (second), and bronze (third) in four disciplines – men's singles, ladies singles, pair skating, and ice dancing – across three levels: senior, junior, and novice.

The event determined the U.S. team for the 1964 Olympic Games and 1964 World Championships.

== Senior results ==
=== Men ===
Scott Allen defeated defending champion Thomas Litz, winning both the compulsory figures and free skating.

Rank	Name
1	Scott Allen
2	Thomas Litz
3	Monty Hoyt
4	Gary Visconti
5	Billy Chapel
6	David Edwards
7	Buddy Zak

=== Ladies ===
Peggy Fleming was the surprise champion. She had placed third in the compulsory figures. Fleming skated a spectacular free skating with a succession of double jumps with flow and ease, completing her program with a flawless fast spin.

Rank	Name
1	Peggy Fleming
2	Albertina Noyes
3	Christine Haigler
4	Lorraine Hanlon
5	Barbara Roles-Pursley
6	Myrna Bodek
7	Joya Utermohlen
8	Lynn Thomas

=== Pairs ===
Siblings Judianne Fotheringill / Jerry Fotheringill retained their title, and Vivian / Ronald Joseph retained their silver medals.

Rank	Name
1	Judianne Fotheringill / Jerry Fotheringill
2	Vivian Joseph / Ronald Joseph
3	Cynthia Kauffman / Ronald Kauffman

=== Ice dancing (Gold dance) ===
Darlene Streich / Charles Fetter were the new champions.

Rank	Name
1	Darlene Streich / Charles Fetter
2	Carol MacSween / Robert Munz
3	Lorna Dyer / John Carrell
4	Ardith Paul / King Cole

== Junior results ==
=== Men ===
Rank	Name
1	Tim Wood
2	Duane Maki
3	Richard Callaghan
4	Paul McGrath

=== Ladies ===
Rank	Name
1	Carol S. Noir

=== Pairs ===
Rank	Name
1	Barbara Yaggi / Gene Floyd

=== Ice dancing (Silver dance) ===
Rank	Name
1	Kristin Fortune / Claude Sweet
