= 1966 World Figure Skating Championships =

1966 edition of the World Figure Skating Championships

- Type: ISU Championship
- Date: February 22 – 27
- Season: 1965–66
- Location: Davos, Switzerland

Champions
- Men's singles: (Austria) Emmerich Danzer
- Ladies' singles: (United States) Peggy Fleming
- Pairs: (Soviet Union) Lyudmila Belousova / Oleg Protopopov
- Ice dance: (United Kingdom) Diane Towler / Bernard Ford
- Previous: 1965 World Championships
- Next: 1967 World Championships

The 1966 World Figure Skating Championships were held in Davos, Switzerland from February 22 to 27. At the event, sanctioned by the International Skating Union, medals were awarded in men's singles, ladies' singles, pair skating, and ice dance.

== Medal table ==
* Host nation (Switzerland)

Rank	Nation	Gold	Silver	Bronze	Total
1	United States	1	1	3	5
2	Austria	1	1	0	2
2	Soviet Union	1	1	0	2
4	Great Britain	1	0	0	1
5	East Germany	0	1	0	1
6	Canada	0	0	1	1
Totals (6 entries)		4	4	4	12

== Results ==
=== Men ===
Rank	Name	Places
1	(Austria) Emmerich Danzer	11
2	(Austria) Wolfgang Schwarz	25
3	(United States) Gary Visconti	28
4	(United States) Scott Allen	33
5	(Japan) Nobuo Satō	46
6	(France) Patrick Péra	52
7	(Canada) Donald Knight	66
8	(Czechoslovakia) Ondrej Nepela	82
9	(Italy) Giordano Abbondati	92
10	(Canada) Jay Humphry	100
11	(Canada) Charles Snelling	103
12	(United States) William Chapel	106
13	(France) Robert Dureville	106
14	(East Germany) Ralph Borghard	111
15	(Hungary) Jenő Ébert	124
16	(Austria) Günter Anderl	148
17	(Soviet Union) Valeriy Meshkov	157
18	(United Kingdom) Malcolm Cannon	160
19	(Japan) Tsuguhiko Kodzuka	168
20	(East Germany) Bodo Bockenauer	175
21	(Switzerland) Hans-Jürg Studer	185

Judges:

- (Hungary) Zoltán Balázs
- (Canada) Suzanne Francis
- (Austria) Oskar Madl
- (Japan) Kikuko Minami
- (West Germany) Eugen Romminger
- (United States) John R. Shoemaker
- (Switzerland) Rolf J. Steinmann
- (France) Néri Valdes
- (Soviet Union) Sergey Vasilyev

=== Ladies ===
Rank	Name	Places
1	(United States) Peggy Fleming	9
2	(East Germany) Gabriele Seyfert	22
3	(Canada) Petra Burka	23
4	(Canada) Valerie Jones	41
5	(France) Nicole Hassler	42
6	(Czechoslovakia) Hana Mašková	63
7	(Hungary) Zsuzsa Almássy	63
8	(Japan) Miwa Fukuhara	67
9	(United States) Albertina Noyes	83
10	(Japan) Kumiko Ōkawa	88
11	(West Germany) Uschi Keszler	101
12	(United States) Pamela Schneider	105
13	(United Kingdom) Sally-Anne Stapleford	115
14	(Austria) Elisabeth Mikula	132
15	(Canada) Roberta Laurent	133
16	(Austria) Elisabeth Nestler	148
17	(Soviet Union) Yelena Shcheglova	151
18	(Switzerland) Pia Zürcher	151
19	(East Germany) Beate Richter	170
20	(East Germany) Martina Clausner	176

Judges:

- (Czechoslovakia) Milan Duchón
- (Austria) Walter Malek
- (United States) Yvonne S. McGowan
- (Canada) Joan McLagan
- (France) Gérard Rodrigues-Henriques
- (East Germany) V. Siegmund
- (Japan) Kinuko Ueno
- (United Kingdom) Geoffrey Yates
- (West Germany) János Zsigmondy

=== Pairs ===
Rank	Name	Places
1	(Soviet Union) Lyudmila Belousova / Oleg Protopopov	13
2	(Soviet Union) Tatyana Zhuk / Aleksandr Gorelik	14
3	(United States) Cynthia Kauffman / Ronald Kauffman	30
4	(West Germany) Margot Glockshuber / Wolfgang Danne	35
5	(West Germany) Sonja Pfersdorf / Günther Matzdorf	46
6	(West Germany) Gudrun Hauss / Walter Häfner	56
7	(East Germany) Irene Müller / Hans-Georg Dallmer	60
8	(Switzerland) Monique Mathys / Yves Ällig	80.5
9	(East Germany) Heidemarie Steiner / Heinz-Ulrich Walther	87.5
10	(Czechoslovakia) Agnesa Wlachovská / Peter Bartosiewicz	89
11	(United States) Susan Behrens / Roy Wagelein	92
12	(Switzerland) Mónika Szabó / Péter Szabó	104
13	(Canada) Susan Huehnergard / Paul Huehnergard	118
14	(Austria) Gerlinde Schönbauer / Wilhelm Bietak	124
15	(Hungary) Mária Csordás / László Kondi	131

Judges:

- (Czechoslovakia) Zdeněk Fikar
- (Canada) Suzanne Francis
- (East Germany) Walburga Grimm
- (West Germany) Wilhelm Kahle
- (Hungary) Klára Kozári
- (United States) Yvonne S. McGowan
- (Austria) Hans Meixner
- (Switzerland) Rolf J. Steinmann
- (Soviet Union) Tatyana Tolmachova

=== Ice dance ===
Rank	Name	Places
1	(United Kingdom) Diane Towler / Bernard Ford	9
2	(United States) Kristin Fortune / Dennis Sveum	17
3	(United States) Lorna Dyer / John Carrell	17
4	(United Kingdom) Yvonne Suddick / Roger Kennerson	27
5	(France) Brigitte Martin / Francis Gamichon	41
6	(United Kingdom) Janet Sawbridge / Jon Lane	42
7	(West Germany) Gabriele Rauch / Rudi Matysik	53
8	(Czechoslovakia) Jitka Babická / Jaromír Holan	53
9	(Canada) Carole Forrest / Kevin Lethbridge	59
10	(Soviet Union) Lyudmila Pakhomova / Viktor Ryzhkin	68
11	(United States) Susan Urban / Stanley Urban	79
12	(Canada) Gail Snyder / Wayne Palmer	91
13	(East Germany) Annerose Baier / Eberhard Rüger	92.5
14	(Italy) Susanna Carpani / Sergio Pirelli	94.5
15	(Hungary) Edit Mató / Károly Csanádi	98
16	(Austria) Christel Trebesiner / Herbert Rothkappel	111

Judges:

- (United Kingdom) Pamela Davis
- (Czechoslovakia) Milan Duchón
- (Hungary) Klára Kozári
- (Austria) Hans Kutschera
- (France) Lysiane Lauret
- (Canada) Dorothy Leamen
- (United States) John R. Shoemaker

== Sources ==
- Figure Skating: World Champions
