= Huehnergard =

Huehnergard is a surname. Notable people with the surname include:

- John Huehnergard (born 1952), Canadian-American philologist and linguist
- Paul Huehnergard (fl. 1960s), Canadian pair skater
- Susan Huehnergard (fl. 1960s), Canadian pair skater, sister of Paul
