= Sports in Cleveland =

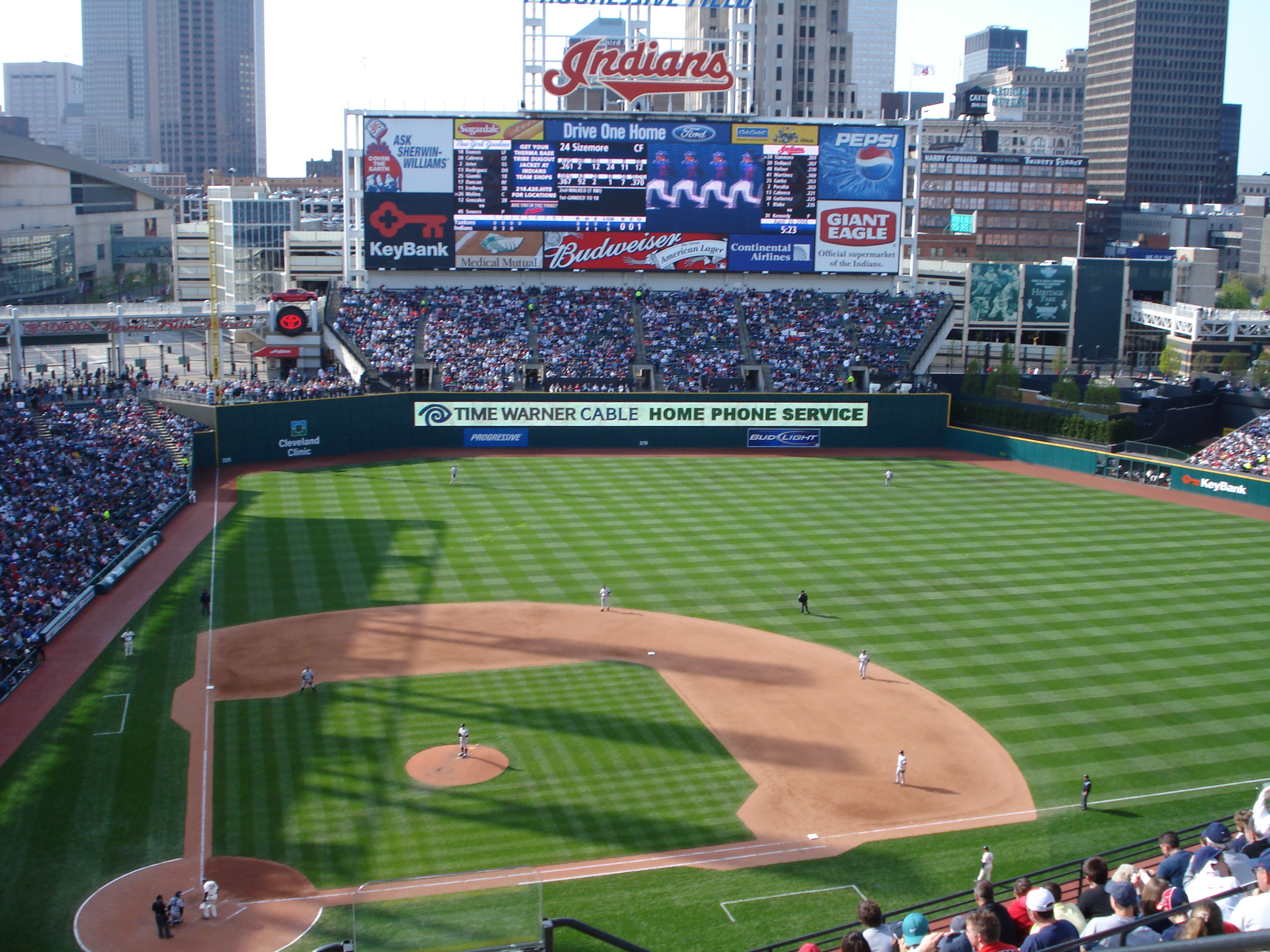
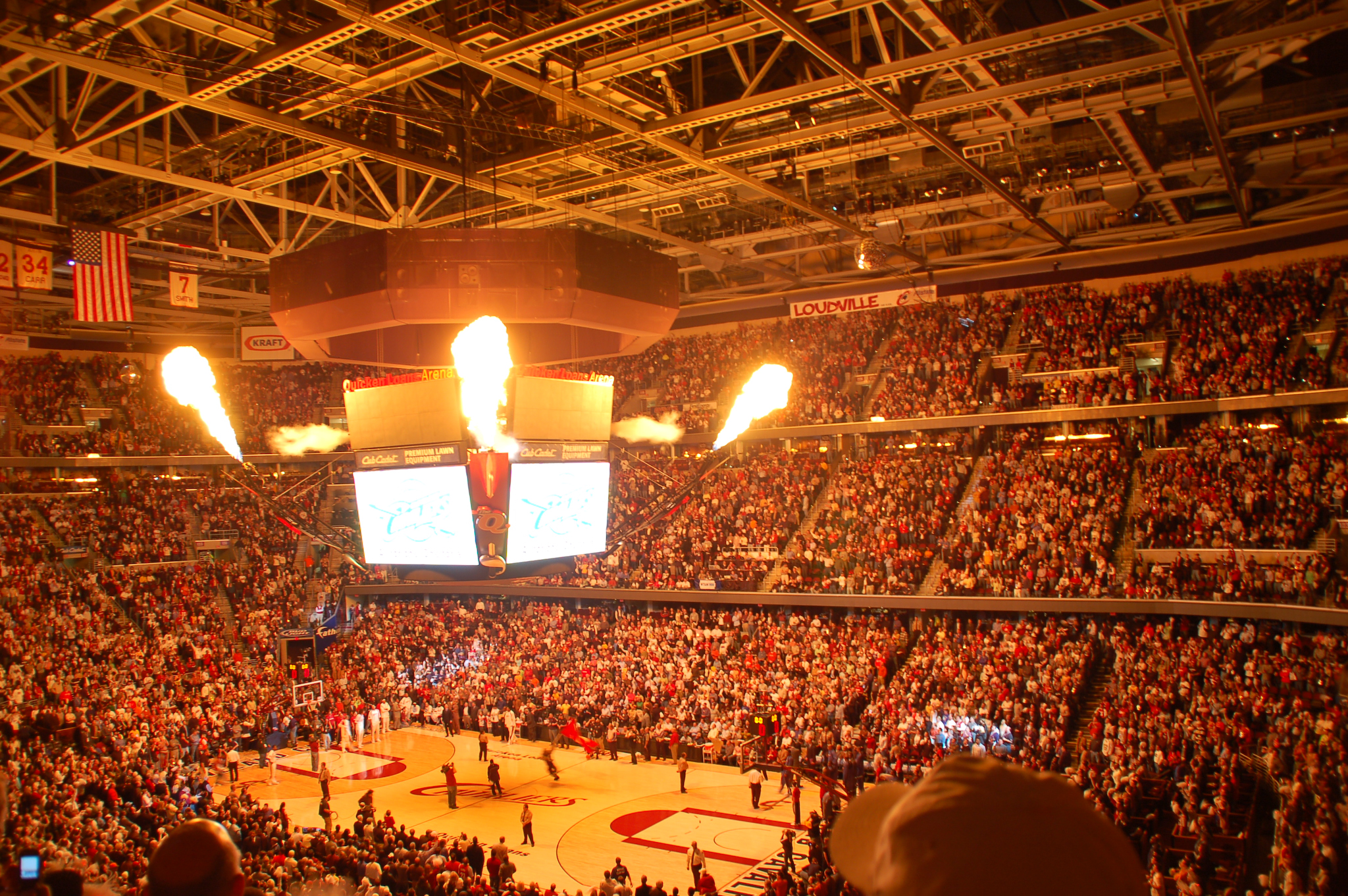
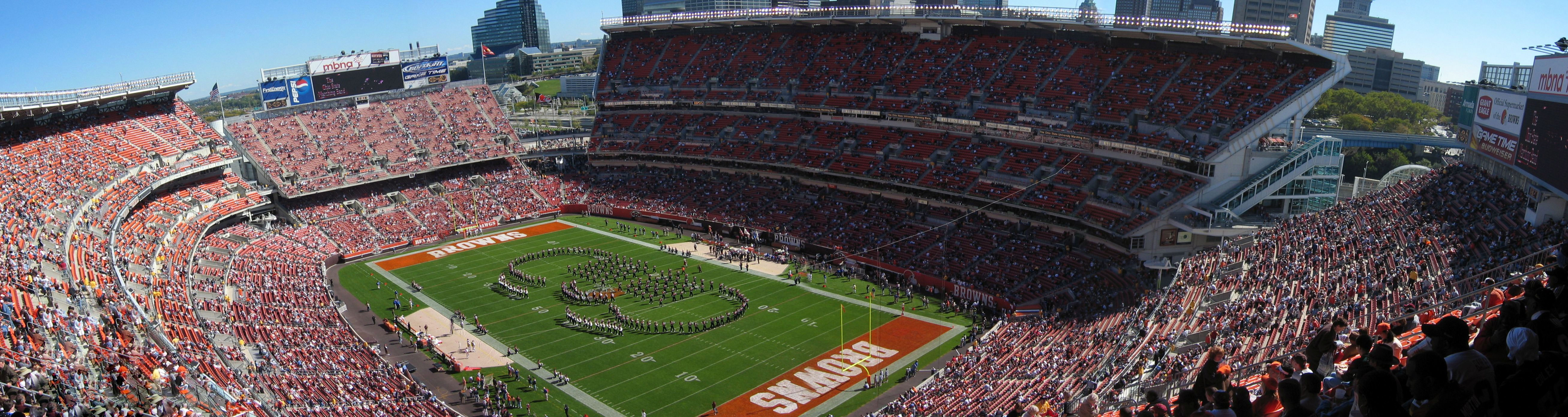
Progressive Field, home of the Cleveland Guardians (top left); Rocket Arena, home of the Cleveland Cavaliers (top right); and Huntington Bank Field, home of the Cleveland Browns (bottom)

The Cleveland sports community is anchored by three major professional sports league teams: the Cleveland Browns (National Football League), Cleveland Guardians (Major League Baseball), and Cleveland Cavaliers (National Basketball Association). The city is also home to two minor league affiliates that serve as developmental teams for major league franchises: the Cleveland Monsters (American Hockey League, affiliated with the Columbus Blue Jackets of the NHL) and Cleveland Charge (NBA G League, affiliated with the Cavaliers). Another professional team, the Cleveland Crunch, play in Major League Indoor Soccer. Local sporting facilities include Progressive Field, Huntington Bank Field, Rocket Arena, the Wolstein Center, and Public Auditorium.

Historically, the Browns have been among the winningest franchises in American football history winning eight titles during a short period of time—1946, 1947, 1948, 1949, 1950, 1954, 1955, and 1964. The Browns have never played in a Super Bowl, getting a game away five times making it to the NFL/AFC Championship Game in 1968, 1969, 1986, 1987, and 1989. Former owner Art Modell's relocation of the Browns after the 1995 season (to Baltimore creating the Ravens), caused tremendous heartbreak and resentment among local fans. Cleveland mayor, Michael R. White, worked with the NFL and Commissioner Paul Tagliabue to bring back the Browns beginning in 1999 season, retaining all team history. In earlier NFL history, the Cleveland Bulldogs won the NFL Championship in 1924, and the Cleveland Rams won the NFL Championship in 1945 before relocating to Los Angeles.

The Cleveland Guardians (then known as the Indians) won the World Series in 1920 and 1948. They also won the American League pennant, making the World Series in the 1954, 1995, 1997, and 2016 seasons. Between 1995 and 2001, Progressive Field (then known as Jacobs Field) sold out 455 consecutive games, a Major League Baseball record until it was broken in 2008. The franchise changed its name beginning with the 2022 season from the Indians to the Guardians.

The Cavaliers have won the Eastern Conference in 2007, 2015, 2016, 2017 and 2018. The team's first and only NBA championship was won in 2016 after coming back from a 3–1 deficit, defeating the defending champions Golden State Warriors. Afterwards, an estimated 1.3 million people attended a parade held in the Cavs honor on June 22, 2016. This was the first time the city had planned for a championship parade in 50 years. Basketball, the Cleveland Rosenblums dominated the original American Basketball League winning three of the first five championships (1926, 1929, 1930), and the Cleveland Pipers, owned by George Steinbrenner, won the American Basketball League championship in 1962.

From 1964–2016, the city's failure to win a trophy in any major professional sport earned a reputation of being a cursed sports city, extensively covered by the 2016 ESPN 30 for 30 documentary Believeland. In addition, changes in the Cleveland sports landscape led to further heartbreak and resentment among local fans, the most notable instances being Art Modell's relocation of the Browns to Baltimore after the 1995 season (that franchise became the Ravens, with the current Browns team starting play in 1999), and Akron native LeBron James' decision to leave the Cavaliers in 2010 for the Miami Heat. The Cleveland sports curse is considered to have ended in June 2016, when the Cavaliers won the NBA Championship against the defending champion Golden State Warriors. Shortly before the Cavaliers' victory, the Monsters defeated the Hershey Bears to become AHL champions, the first time a Cleveland hockey team had won the Calder Cup since 1964.

Notable Cleveland athletes to win top individual accolades include boxer Johnny Kilbane, U.S. Olympic Hall of Fame track and field competitors Jesse Owens and Harrison Dillard, mixed martial artist Stipe Miocic, snowboarder Red Gerard, pole vaulter Katie Nageotte, and professional wrestlers Mike "The Miz" Mizanin and Dolph Ziggler (real name Nic Nemeth). Kilbane had a 12-year reign as World Featherweight Champion and is an International Boxing Hall of Fame inductee. Owens, who grew up in Cleveland after moving from Alabama when he was nine, participated in the 1936 Summer Olympics in Berlin, where he achieved international fame by winning four gold medals: one each in the 100 meters, the 200 meters, the long jump, and as part of the 4 × 100 meter relay team. Cleveland native Dillard is a four-time Olympic gold medalist, having won his medals during the 1948 and 1952 Summer Olympics in various track and field events. Cleveland State University alum and area native Miocic is a two-time UFC World Heavyweight Champion. Area natives Gerard and Nagotte won Olympic gold medals for snowboarding (2018 Winter Olympics) and pole vaulting (2020 Summer Olympics) respectively. Area natives Mizanin and Ziggler are both two-time World Champions in WWE, with Mizanin holding the WWE Championship and Ziggler the World Heavyweight Championship.

== Teams ==
=== Professional ===
==== Current ====
Major League

Club	Sport	League	Venue	Est. in CLE	Championships (in Cleveland)
Cleveland Browns	Football	National Football League	Huntington Bank Field	1946	8 (4 AAFC, 4 NFL)
Cleveland Cavaliers	Basketball	National Basketball Association	Rocket Arena	1970	1
Cleveland Sirens	Basketball	Women's National Basketball Association	Rocket Arena	2028	0
Cleveland Guardians	Baseball	Major League Baseball	Progressive Field	1901	2

Minor League

Club	Sport	League	Venue	Est. in CLE	Championships (in Cleveland)
Cleveland Charge	Basketball	NBA G League	Public Auditorium	2021	0*
Cleveland Monsters	Ice hockey	American Hockey League	Rocket Arena	2007	1
Cleveland Crunch	Indoor Soccer	Major League Indoor Soccer	Wolstein Center	1989	5 (3 NPSL, 1 M2, 1 MLIS)

(*) - The Charge have one NBA G League (then known as NBADL) Championship to their credit from 2006 when they were based in Albuquerque, New Mexico and known as the Thunderbirds.

==== Past ====
Club	League	Venue	First season (in Cleveland)	Last season (in Cleveland)	Fate of team	Championships (in Cleveland)
Cleveland Barons	National Hockey League	Richfield Coliseum	1976	1978	Merged with Minnesota North Stars	0
Cleveland Blues	National League	Kennard Street Park	1879	1884	Absorbed into the Brooklyn Dodgers	0
Cleveland Indians/Bulldogs	National Football League	Dunn Field	1923	1927	Moved to Detroit	1
Cleveland Rams	American Football League; National Football League	League Park; Cleveland Municipal Stadium; Shaw Stadium	1936	1945	Moved to Los Angeles	1
Cleveland Indians/Tigers	Ohio League; American Professional Football Association; National Football League	League Park	1916	1922	Team folded	0
Cleveland Indians of 1931	National Football League	Cleveland Municipal Stadium	1931	1931	Team folded	0
Cleveland Spiders	American Association; National League	League Park; National League Park	1887	1899	Team folded	1
Cleveland Rosenblums	American Basketball League	Cleveland Public Hall	1925	1931	Team folded	3
Cleveland Barons	American Hockey League	Cleveland Arena	1937	1973	Moved to Jacksonville	9
Cleveland Rebels	Basketball Association of America	Cleveland Arena	1946	1947	Team folded	0
Cleveland Pipers	American Basketball League	Cleveland Public Hall; Cleveland Arena	1961	1962	Team folded	1
Cleveland Crusaders	World Hockey Association	Cleveland Arena; Richfield Coliseum	1972	1976	Moved to Saint Paul	0
Cleveland Force	Major Indoor Soccer League	Richfield Coliseum	1978	1988	Team folded	0
Cleveland Jaybirds	American Professional Slo-Pitch League	Rose Field	1977	1978	Changed name with new owner Ted Stepien	0
Cleveland Stepien's Competitors	APSPL, North American Softball League	Rose Field; Daniel's Field	1979	1980	Disbanded with league (NASL)	0
Cleveland Competitors	United Professional Softball League	Daniel's Field	1982	1982	Disbanded with league	0
Cleveland Thunderbolts	Arena Football League	Richfield Coliseum	1992	1994	Team folded	0
Cleveland Gladiators	Arena Football League	Quicken Loans Arena	2008	2017	League folded before the team could return from hiatus	0
Cleveland Lumberjacks	International Hockey League	Richfield Coliseum; Gund Arena	1992	2001	Team and league folded	0
Cleveland Rockers	Women's National Basketball Association	Gund Arena	1997	2003	Team folded	0
Cleveland Barons	American Hockey League	Gund Arena	2001	2006	Moved to Worcester	0
Cleveland Crush	Legends Football League	Quicken Loans Arena	2011	2013	Moved to Toledo	0

=== College ===
Club	Sport	League	Venue	Location
Cleveland State Vikings	16 Varsity (7 men's, 9 women's)	NCAA Division I (Horizon League)	various – including: Krenzler Field (soccer); Wolstein Center (men's and women's basketball); Woodling Gym (wrestling and volleyball)	Cleveland
Case Western Reserve Spartans	19 Varsity (10 men's, 9 women's)	NCAA Division III (University Athletic Association)	various – including: DiSanto Field (football, soccer); Veale Athletic Center (men's and women's basketball)	Cleveland

== Current arenas and stadiums ==
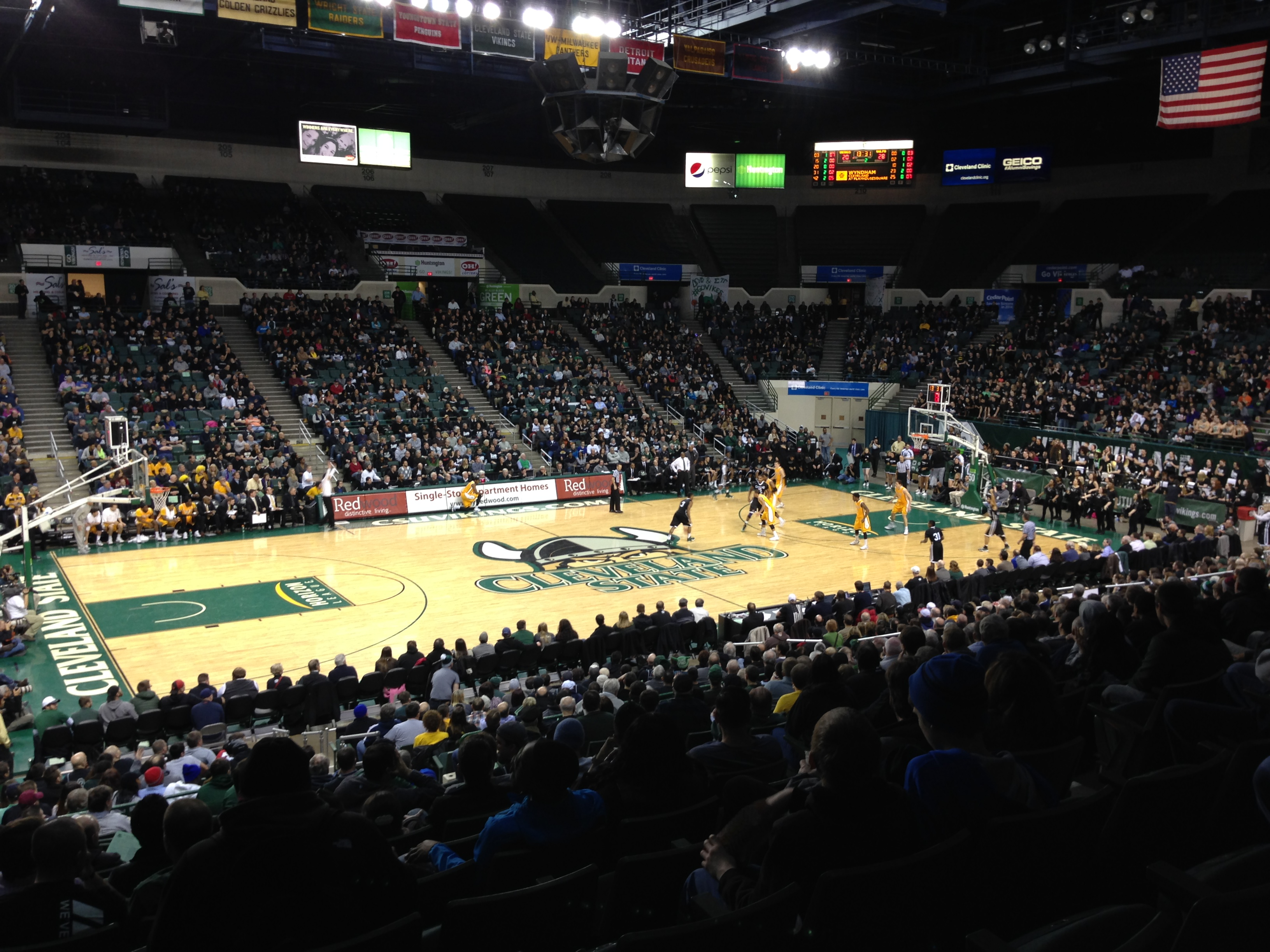
The Wolstein Center is home to Cleveland State Vikings men's and women's basketball.

Facility name	Year opened
Huntington Bank Field	1999
Progressive Field	1994
Public Auditorium	1922
Rocket Arena	1994
Wolstein Center	1991
DiSanto Field	2005

== Major professional championships ==
=== MLB ===
- Cleveland Buckeyes (1)

1945 Negro World Series championship

- Cleveland Guardians (2)

1920 & 1948 World Series championships (known then as the Indians)

- Cleveland Spiders (1)

1895 Temple Cup Series championship

=== NBA ===
- Cleveland Cavaliers (1)

2016 NBA championship

=== NFL ===
- Cleveland Browns (8)

1946, 1947, 1948, & 1949 AAFC championships
1950, 1954, 1955, & 1964 NFL championships*

- Cleveland Bulldogs (1)

1924 NFL championship*

- Cleveland Rams (1)

1945 NFL championship*

(*) - Pre-Super Bowl era

== Past teams ==
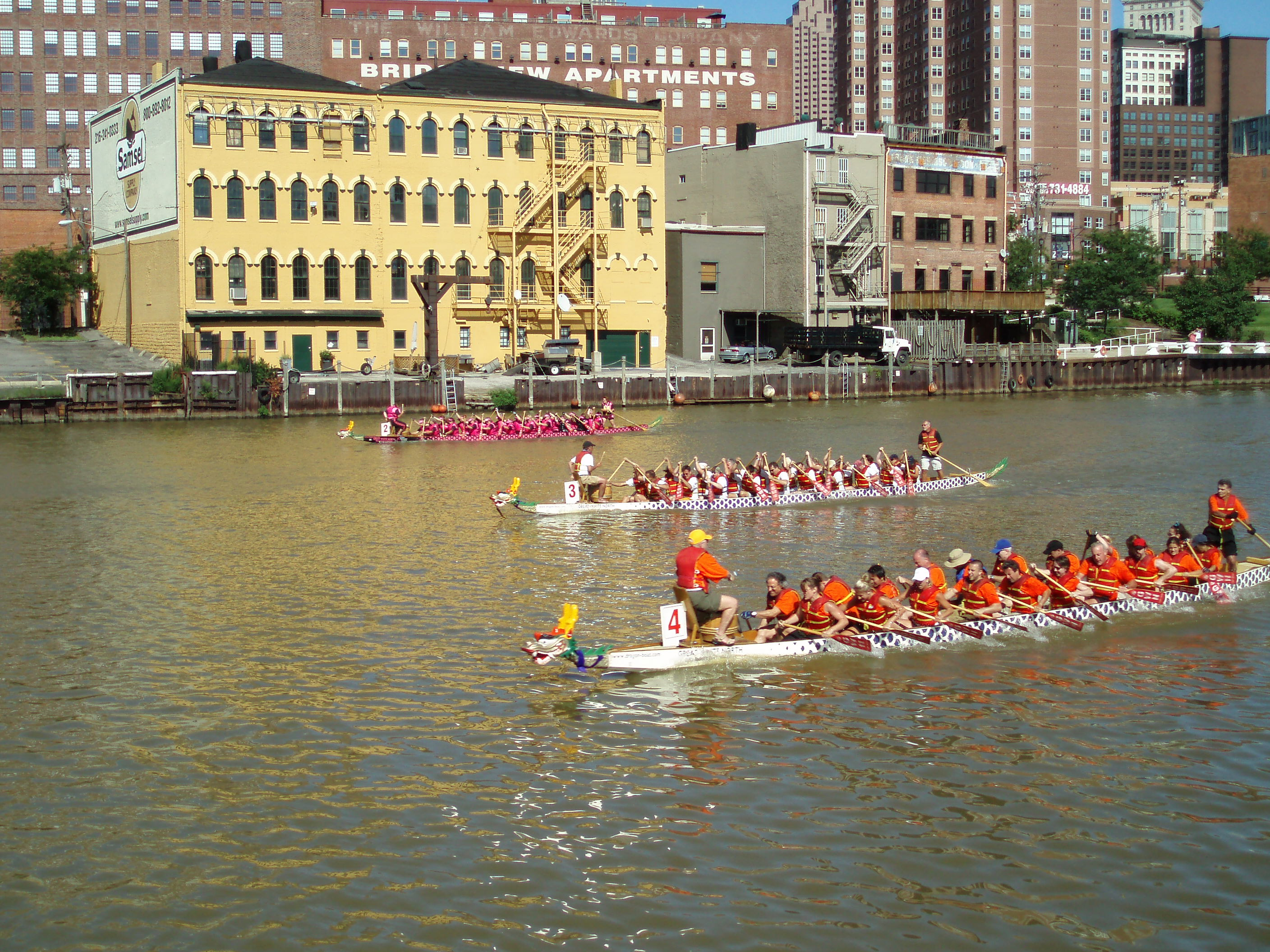
Dragon boat racing on the Cuyahoga River

The city has been home to several additional professional sports franchises, including a women's basketball team, multiple soccer teams, and a past incarnation of the Cleveland Browns now known as the Baltimore Ravens. Cleveland has also been home to several ice hockey franchises, beginning in 1937 with the AHL member Cleveland Barons. The original Barons, although having been the most successful team in AHL history at that point, moved to Jacksonville, Florida, where they subsequently folded after one season. The salient cause of the Baron's move came from Nick Mileti's short-lived WHA franchise, the Cleveland Crusaders, which shared the old Cleveland Arena with the Barons in beginning in 1972. The new league ultimately created a financial disparity that the Barons could not compete with. Local philanthropist George Gund III facilitated the relocation of the NHL's California Golden Seals to Cleveland in 1976 and renamed them the Barons. However, this latest incarnation was short lived, with the team merging with the Minnesota North Stars following the 1977–78 season. In 1992 the Cleveland Lumberjacks, of the also now-defunct IHL, began play and lasted until 2001. Later in 2001, a third incarnation of the Barons was established, this time having returned to the AHL. The Barons moved to Worcester, Massachusetts following the 2006 season.

In 1997, Cleveland was awarded one of the original eight franchises in the WNBA, the Cleveland Rockers. Although the Rockers finished first in the WNBA Eastern Conference on two occasions, they never made an appearance in the WNBA Finals. The team folded in 2003 after the league was unable to find a new owner. Previous owner Gordon Gund had dropped the team from operation, citing financial losses and poor attendance.

From 1978 to 1988, Cleveland was home to the Cleveland Force of the MISL. After the Force folded in 1988 they were replaced by the Cleveland Crunch of the NPSL and MISL, who played from 1989 to 2005. The Crunch won three league championships in the 1990s, being the first Cleveland sports team to win a championship since the 1964 Cleveland Browns. They re-adopted the Force name in 2002 before ceasing operations in 2005. The Crunch returned in 2021 playing in the Major Arena Soccer League 2.

Outdoor soccer has also been represented in Cleveland via the Cleveland Cobras (1972-Cleveland Stars, 1973–1981 Cobras) of the ASL and the Cleveland Stokers (1967–1968) of the North American Soccer League.

The Cleveland City Stars played in the United Soccer Leagues from 2006 to 2009, winning the USL Second Division championship in 2008 before folding after the 2009 season.

The Cleveland Spiders played in the National League of Major League Baseball from 1887 to 1899. The team folded after the team owners (Robison brothers) had purchased the St. Louis Browns and sent all of Cleveland's star players there. Hall of Fame pitcher Cy Young began his career with the Spiders and threw the first of his No-hitters with them.

The Cleveland Gladiators formerly played in the Arena Football League from 2008 to 2017. The team played home games in Quicken Loans arena. They reached the arena bowl in 2014. The team was placed on hiatus for the 2018 and 2019 seasons while renovations were underway at their home arena. Unfortunately for the team the AFL ceased operations before the team could return for 2020.

== College sports ==
The headquarters of the Mid-American Conference (MAC) are located in Cleveland. The conference also stages both its men's and women's basketball tournaments at Rocket Arena.

In NCAA Division I, Cleveland State University fields 16 varsity sports playing in the Horizon League. The Cleveland State Vikings men's and women's basketball teams play their home games at the Wolstein Center. The university has periodically considered forming a non-scholarship Division I FCS football program.

In NCAA Division III, Case Western Reserve University fields 19 varsity sports playing in the UAA. Most notably, in both present day and in Cleveland pastime, is the Case Western Reserve Spartans football team, who boasts a history of football dating back to 1890. Home games are played at DiSanto Field in University Circle.

Although there is no Division I college football team based in the city itself, Cleveland is nationally known for its support of Ohio State Buckeyes football. This is due to the team playing occasional games in Cleveland throughout the years, the large fan base of the Buckeyes (including many Ohio State alumni in the Cleveland/NE Ohio area), and numerous Cleveland area high school standouts playing for OSU (such as Glenville High School alums Troy Smith, winner of the 2006 Heisman Trophy, and 2014 National Championship winning quarterback Cardale Jones). Cleveland's devotion to Buckeyes football has been documented by fan surveys, television ratings, and even the Terminal Tower being lit up in scarlet and gray during OSU's 2014 National Championship run.

The most notable college football win for Cleveland was the city’s only college football bowl game victory—the 1941 Sun Bowl—where the Western Reserve Red Cats, now known as Case Western Reserve University, defeated the Arizona State Bulldogs, now nicknamed Sun Devils, 26–13.

== Major events ==
Cleveland facilities have hosted the Major League Baseball All-Star Game six times, the NBA All-Star Game three times, and the United States Figure Skating Championships four times. The city hosted the Gravity Games, an extreme sports series, from 2002 to 2004, and the Dew Action Sports Tour Right Guard Open in 2007. In 2013 the city hosted about 11,000 male and female athletes at the National Senior Games. Cleveland hosted the 2014 Gay Games. Cleveland bid to host the 1916 Summer Olympics, but lost to Berlin. Those games were ultimately canceled due to World War I. Cleveland also made an effort to secure the 1920 Summer Olympics, but lost to Antwerp.

Event	Number	Venue	Years
MLB All Star Game	6	Cleveland Municipal Stadium; Progressive Field	1935, 1954, 1963, 1981; 1997, 2019
NBA All Star Game	3	Richfield Coliseum; Rocket Arena	1981; 1997, 2022
International Gay Games	1	Rocket Arena, multiple venues	2014
Ultimate Fighting Championship	1	Rocket Arena	2016 (UFC 203)
U.S. Figure Skating Championships	4	Cleveland Arena; Rocket Arena	1940, 1964; 2000, 2009
NFL Draft	1	Downtown Cleveland, multiple venues	2021
Davis Cup	10	Multiple venues	1960, 1961, 1962, 1966, 1968, 1979 (preliminary matches); 1964, 1969, 1970, 1973 (championship matches)
U.S. Pro Tennis Championships	13	Cleveland Arena, multiple venues	1950-1962

== See also ==
- Cleveland sports curse
- Greater Cleveland
- Greater Cleveland Sports Hall of Fame
