= Petra Burka =

Canadian figure skater and coach

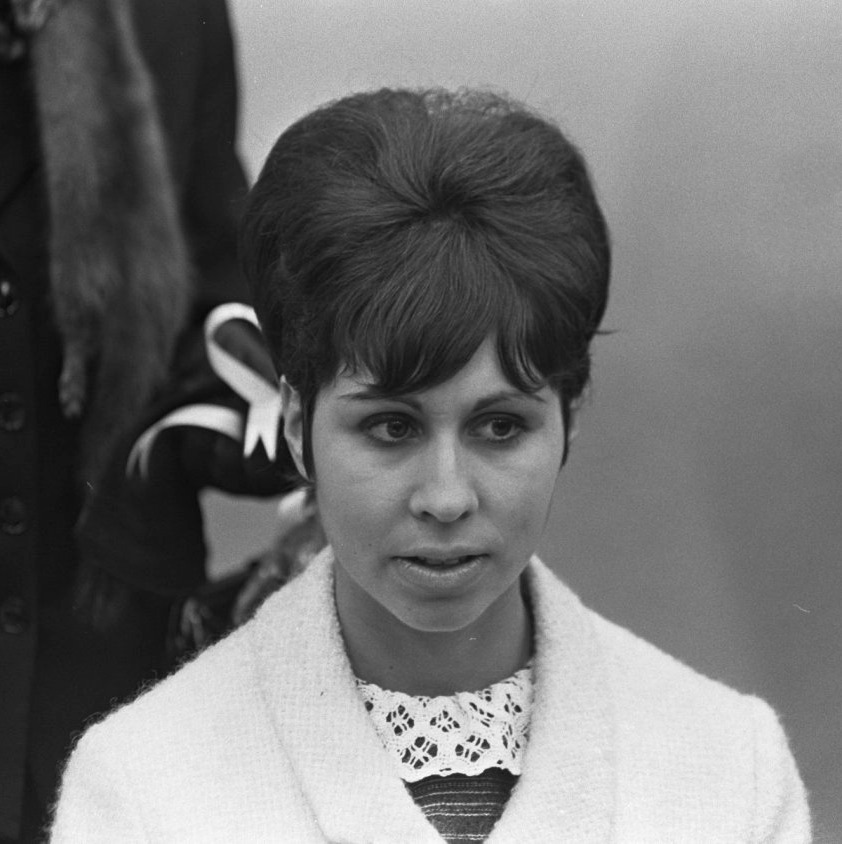
- Petra Burka in 1965

Personal information
- Born: November 17, 1946 (age 80) Amsterdam, Netherlands
- Height: 1.53 m (5 ft 0 in)

Figure skating career
- Country: Canada
- Skating club: Toronto Skating Club
- Retired: 1969
Medal record
Representing Canada
Figure skating: Ladies' singles
Olympic Games
Bronze medal – third place	1964 Innsbruck	Singles
World Championships
Bronze medal – third place	1966 Davos	singles
Gold medal – first place	1965 Colorado Springs	Singles
Bronze medal – third place	1964 Dortmund	Singles
North American Championships
Gold medal – first place	1965 Rochester	Singles
Silver medal – second place	1963 Vancouver	Singles

Petra Burka (/ˈpiːtrə ˈbɜːrkə/; born November 17, 1946) is a Canadian former competitive figure skater and now coach. She won the 1964 Olympic bronze medal in women's figure skating and the 1965 World championship in the sport.

== Personal life ==
Petra Burka was born in Amsterdam, Netherlands on November 17, 1946, the daughter of Dutch figure skater and coach Ellen Burka and a Czech-born artist, Jan Burka. The family moved to Canada in 1951. Her parents divorced in the mid-1950s. Raised as Christians, Petra and her sister, Astra, were in their late teens when their mother told them about her background as a Holocaust survivor.

== Career ==
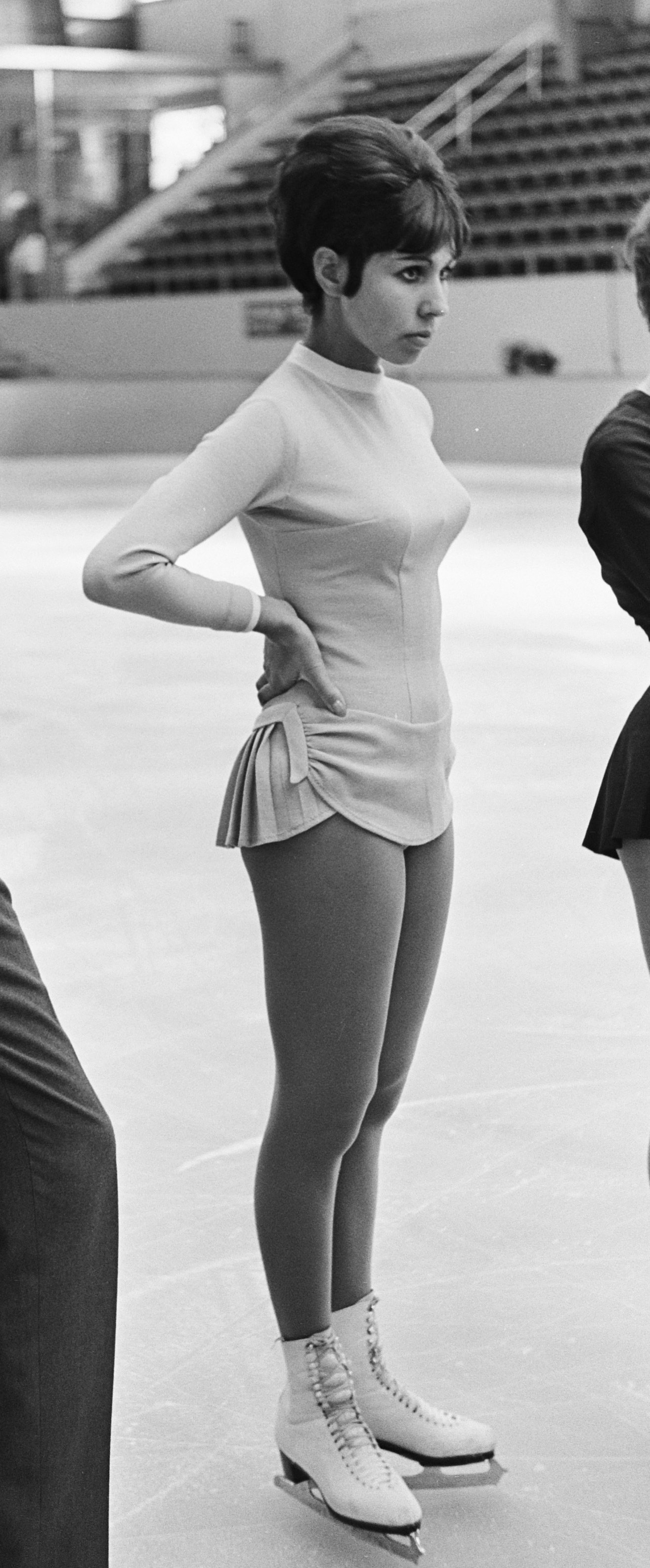
Petra Burka in 1965

Petra Burka began skating lessons at the age of 10 or 11. Her mother, also her coach, was advised by Osborne Colson of her talent. Burka was the Canadian junior champion in 1961. At the 1962 Canadian Championships, Burka became the first woman to land a triple Salchow and came away with the silver medal. She finished in fourth place in her World Championship debut in Prague in the same year. The father of one of Ellen Burka's students, Stafford Smythe, arranged for Petra – who was in need of extra ice time – to train at Maple Leaf Gardens at 7 a.m. every day before the hockey players arrived at 9:30.

Burka won the first of her three consecutive senior national titles in 1964 and represented Canada at the 1964 Olympics in Innsbruck, winning the bronze medal. Unaware that she was expected to skate an exhibition, she was brought back to the rink in a police car just before she was called onto the ice. Burka became the first Canadian skater to perform in the Soviet Union when she appeared in a two-week tour in Moscow and Kyiv.

Burka won bronze at the 1964 World Championships in Dortmund. She was the gold medalist at the 1965 World Championships in Colorado Springs, Colorado, becoming the first Canadian woman to win Worlds since Barbara Ann Scott in 1947. At the event, she also became the first woman to complete the triple Salchow at a World Championships. Her other achievements were winning Canada's Outstanding Athlete of the Year in 1964 and twice winning Canada's Outstanding Female Athlete of the Year in 1964 and 1965. In 1965 she was also inducted to the Canada's Sports Hall of Fame.

Burka took bronze at the 1966 World Championships and retired from competition. She signed with Holiday On Ice, skating with the tour until 1969. Burka then took on coaching as well as being a commentator on figure skating events for CBC and CBS for Olympic, World, European and Canadian championships. Petra Burka was inducted into the Ontario Sports Hall of Fame in 1995.

== Results ==
International
Event	1960	1961	1962	1963	1964	1965	1966
Winter Olympics					3rd		
World Championships			4th	5th	3rd	1st	3rd
North American Champ.				2nd		1st	
National
Canadian Championships	10th J	1st J	2nd	2nd	1st	1st	1st

== See also ==
- Karen Magnussen
- Elizabeth Manley
- Kaetlyn Osmond
- Joannie Rochette
- Barbara Ann Scott
