= Dennis Sveum =

Dennis Sveum may refer to:

- Dennis Sveum (figure skater) (fl. 1960s), American ice dancer
- Dennis Sveum (ice hockey) (born 1986), Norwegian ice hockey player
