= Lütke =

Lütke is a German language surname. It stems from a reduced form of the male given name Ludolf – and may refer to:

- August Lütke-Westhüs (1926–2000), German equestrian
- Manuela Lütke (born 1967), German footballer
- Tobias Lütke (born 1981), Canadian billionaire

== See also ==
- Ludecke
- Lüdemann (disambiguation)
