= Jan Burka =

- Born: 14 June 1924; Postoloprty, Czechoslovakia
- Died: 4 September 2009 (aged 85); L'Isle-sur-la-Sorgue, France
- Occupations: Painter, graphic artist and sculptor

Jan Burka (14 June 1924 – 4 September 2009) was a Czech painter, graphic artist and sculptor.

== Biography ==
Burka was born in Postoloprty. In 1940, he studied at a private art school, and then attended a course in graphics at the Vinohrady Synagogue, led by Petr Kien. After some time in Prague, he was deported as Geltungsjude, and sent to Terezín on 10 August 1942. In Terezín, he was reunited with Kien, and even in the difficult conditions of the ghetto he continued to study drawing. While in Terezín he also met his future wife, figure skater Ellen Danby, who was raised in the Netherlands. Burka survived in Terezín until its liberation.

After World War II, Burka and Danby settled in Amsterdam, where he studied at the Royal Academy of Fine Arts (Dutch: Rĳksakademie beeldende van Kunsten), under Lütke and Westerman. From 1945 to 1951, he worked as a graphic artist in Amsterdam.

In 1951, he moved to Toronto, Ontario, Canada, where he studied at the Ontario College of Art & Design. There he was linked to Henri Chopin. He divorced his wife Ellen in the mid-1950s. He founded his own graphic arts studio, and together with Allan Fleming, was a co-founder of a Canadian group of designers. From 1961 to 1968, he lived in France, where he made his first reliefs and sculptures. In 1968, he returned to Toronto, where he lived and worked until 1978. Most of his works from this period are now located in Canadian museums.

Burka attended more than a hundred exhibitions in Europe, Canada, and the United States. His works are exhibited in a number of Canadian, American, and European museums and are part of important private collections. In 1968 he received the Ontario price Centenaire du Canada. Burka also won numerous awards for his graphic work and his "Concrete poetry", part of an anthology of experimental poetry, published in 1967.

Burka died in L'Isle-sur-la-Sorgue in 2009.

== See also ==
- List of Czech painters
