= Ellen Burka =

Dutch figure skater

Ellen Burka CM
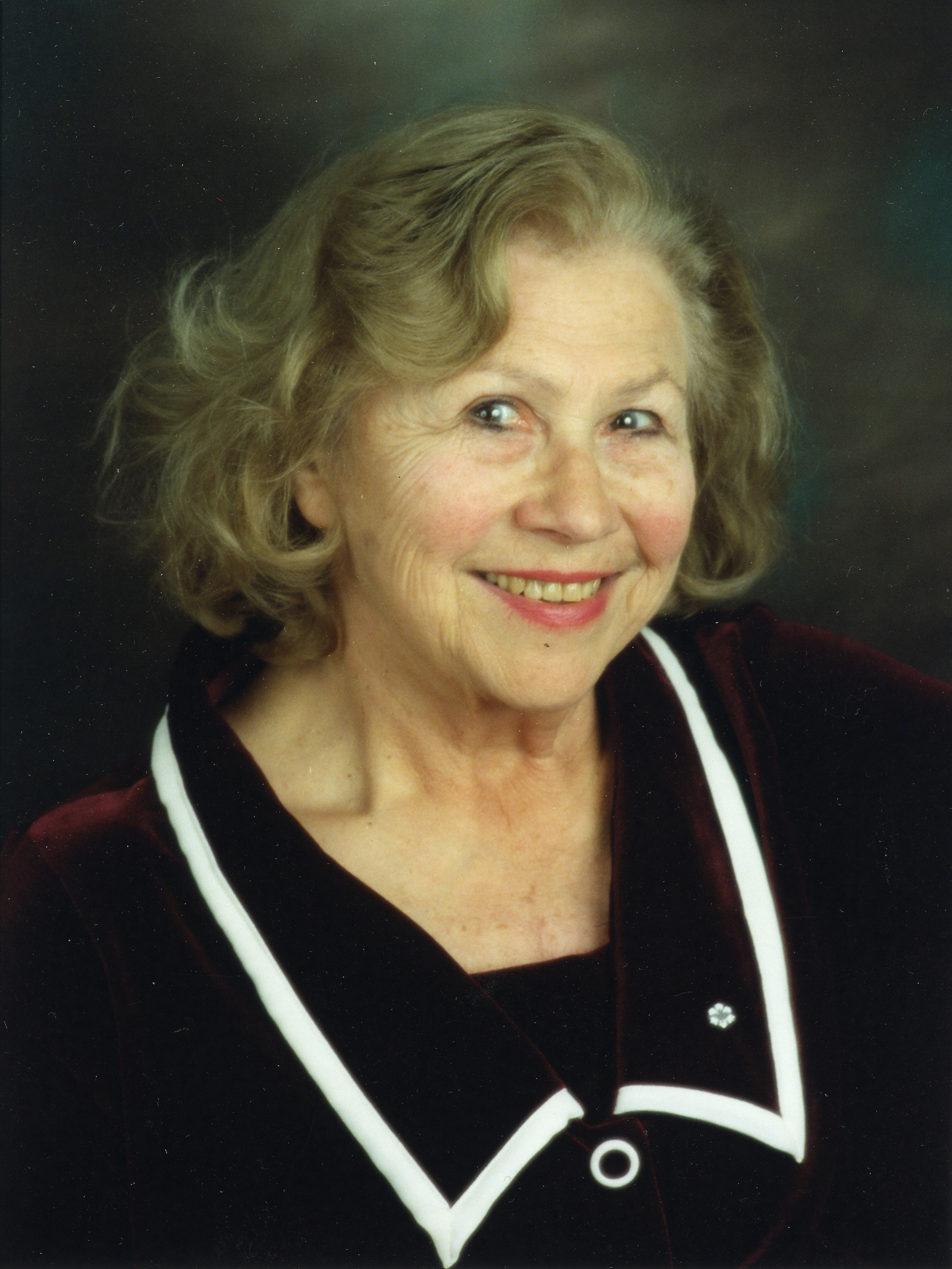
- Burka in c. 1990

Personal information
- Other names: Ellen Danby
- Born: August 11, 1921 Amsterdam, Netherlands
- Died: September 12, 2016 (aged 95) Toronto, Ontario, Canada

Figure skating career
- Country: Netherlands

Ellen Burka CM (née Danby; August 11, 1921 – September 12, 2016) was a Canadian-Dutch figure skater and coach. She became a member of the Order of Canada in 1978 and was inducted into Canada's Sports Hall of Fame in 1996.

== Personal life ==
Ellen Danby was born in Amsterdam, Netherlands, to Jewish parents who met in England. She learned German and English at home and Dutch and French in school. In the spring of 1943, she and her family were sent to Westerbork transit camp. Burka had herself registered at Westerbork as the "Dutch National Figure Skating Champion", though at that time such a championship did not exist; the first official one was held in 1950. Westerbork's commander, Albert Konrad Gemmeker, was very interested in figure skating and ordered that Burka's skates and apparel be sent to the camp. There she was allowed to practice on the frozen pond. Burka also gave culinary advice at Gemmeker's home, and it was the commander's female companion who made sure Ellen was not sent to Sobibor but to Theresienstadt instead. Her parents and grandmother were sent to Sobibor extermination camp, where they were killed.

She met Czech-born artist Jan Burka at the Theresienstadt concentration camp. After liberation of the camp by the Soviet Army, the two walked from Theresienstadt (near Prague) to Ellen's hometown of Amsterdam (about 900 kilometres/560 miles) in just 2 weeks' time to get married on non-communist soil. The family moved to Toronto, Ontario, Canada in 1950. Burka kept the fact that she was Jewish to herself, as many clubs had antisemitic policies that prevented Jews from joining.

Ellen and Jan Burka divorced in the mid-1950s. She raised her two daughters, Petra and Astra, in the Anglican Church and told them of her background when they were in their late teens. She died in Toronto on September 12, 2016.

== Career ==
Burka found Canadian figure skating to be rigid and technical; she decided to blend it with ballet and modern dance and introduced more imaginative choreography.

She coached her daughter, Petra Burka to a bronze medal for Canada at the 1964 Olympics and to the gold at the 1965 World Championships. In 1968, she became the coach of Toller Cranston, who won six Canadian national titles and the 1976 Olympic bronze medal. She also coached Dorothy Hamill, Elvis Stojko, Sandra Bezic / Val Bezic, Patrick Chan, Tracey Wainman, Christopher Bowman and many other world and Olympic competitors.

In 1978, Burka was made Member of the Order of Canada "For elevating skating to an art form and for imaginative choreography on the ice". In 1996, she was inducted into Canada's Sports Hall of Fame. She was also inducted into the Canadian Figure Skating Hall of Fame, the Etobicoke Sports Hall of Fame and the International Jewish Sports Hall of Fame (October 2013).

A documentary about Ellen Burka, Skate to Survive, was directed by her daughter Astra and premiered at the Toronto Jewish Film Festival in May 2008. Virtually unknown in her native Netherlands, her life story was captured in Andere Tijden Sport, a sports history program on Dutch national public TV, in January 2015. For this documentary, she returned to Amsterdam to visit her former family home and the Westerbork transit camp.

Burka taught at the Toronto Cricket, Skating and Curling Club and at The Granite Club in Toronto, Ontario.

A book entitled Figure Skating by Ellen Burka featuring charts and photographs as well as a brief history of ice skating was published in 1974 by Collier-Macmillan Canada, Ltd. In it, she first advises parents to not push their children to become champions and then outlines progressively difficult maneuvers as well as common mistakes in completing them. The cover photograph shows World Champion Petra Burka in mid-air.
