= Patti Gustafson =

American pair skater

Patti Gustafson Feeney is an American former pair skater who competed with Pieter Kollen. Together, they won the bronze medal at the 1963 United States Figure Skating Championships. They were unable to compete at that year's North American Championships because Gustafson injured her foot in training, but she recovered in time to compete at the 1963 World Figure Skating Championships.

Gustafson and Kollen were the first pair team to perform the throw axel, which was invented by their coach Ronald Ludington.

After her competitive career, Gustafson coached skating for 20 years before becoming an ice rink manager in the Dallas, Texas area. She then held a management position with the Ice Skating Institute for 10 years until her retirement in 2007.

== Results ==
Pairs
(with Kollen)

Event	1963
World Championships	9th
U.S. Championships	3rd
