= Sally Schantz =

American figure skater

Personal information
- Other names: Paulette Ormsby
- Home town: Utica, New York

Figure skating career
- Country: United States
- Partner: Stanley Urban
Medal record
Figure skating
Ice dancing
Representing the United States
North American Championships
Bronze medal – third place	1963 Vancouver	Ice dancing

Sally Schantz is an American former figure skater. She competed in ice dance with Stanley Urban. Together, they were the 1963 U.S. Champions.

Schantz was from Indianapolis, Indiana. She represented the Skating Club of Boston while skating with Urban, who was attending Boston College at the time.

Schantz and Urban were unable to defend their title in 1964 because Urban was injured. Schantz decided to turn professional at that time to take a coaching position. She was the coach of an early precision skating team at St. Lawrence University, the "Larriettes". Urban later returned to compete with his sister, but he and Schantz later married.

== Results ==
=== Ice Dance ===
(with Edward H. Smith, Jr.)

Event	1962
U.S. Championships	4th J.

(with Stanley Urban)

Event	1963
World Championships	7th
North American Championships	3rd
U.S. Championships	1st
