= Ludecke =

Ludecke, Lüdecke, Luedecke, Lüddecke or Luddecke is a German surname. Notable people with the surname include:

- Alvin Luedecke (1910–1998), United States Air Force general
- Cornelia Lüdecke (born 1954), German polar researcher
- Kristin Ludecke (born 1977), American beauty pageant contestant
- Kurt Ludecke (1890–1960), German Nazi
- Old Man Luedecke, Canadian singer-songwriter and musician
- Otto-Joachim Lüdecke (1895–1971), German general
- Fritz Lüddecke (1920-1944), German Nazi fighter pilot

== See also ==
- Luedecke Arena, sports venue in Austin, Texas, United States
