= Lüdemann =

Lüdemann is a surname. Notable people with the surname include:

- Barbara Lüdemann (1922–1992), German politician
- Gerd Lüdemann (1946–2021), German New Testament scholar
- Hans Lüdemann (born 1961), German pianist and composer
- Hermann Lüdemann (1880–1959), German politician
- Mirco Lüdemann (born 1973), German professional ice hockey player

== See also ==
- German destroyer Z18 Hans Lüdemann
