= Bernard Ford =

English ice dancer (1947–2023)

Bernard Ford MBE
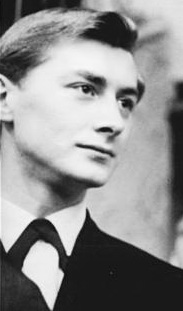
- Ford in 1966

Personal information
- Born: 27 September 1947 Birmingham, England
- Died: 5 April 2023 (aged 75)

Figure skating career
- Country: Great Britain
Medal record
Figure skating
Ice dancing
Representing Great Britain
World Championships
Gold medal – first place	1969 Colorado Springs	Ice dancing
Gold medal – first place	1968 Geneva	Ice dancing
Gold medal – first place	1967 Vienna	Ice dancing
Gold medal – first place	1966 Davos	Ice dancing
European Championships
Gold medal – first place	1969 Garmisch-Partenkirchen	Ice dancing
Gold medal – first place	1968 Västerås	Ice dancing
Gold medal – first place	1967 Ljubljana	Ice dancing
Gold medal – first place	1966 Bratislava	Ice dancing

Bernard Albert Ford MBE (27 September 1947 – 5 April 2023) was an English ice dancer. With partner Diane Towler, he was a four-time (1966–1969) World, European, and British champion. He was also a World Professional ice dancing champion. He later became a coach and choreographer.

== Skating career ==
Ford was born in Birmingham. He competed with Diane Towler. They were coached by Gladys Hogg in London, England at Queens Ice Dance Club. Towler / Ford debuted at the World Championships in 1964, finishing 13th. In 1965, they finished just off the podium in 4th. Towler / Ford won gold at the 1966 European Championships and went on to win their first World title. They would win the World and European titles for four consecutive seasons. At the 1968 Olympics, Towler / Ford skated in a demonstration event for ice dancing, winning the gold medal. Ice dancing became an official part of the Winter Olympics in 1976. Ford, alongside Towler, was appointed of Member of the Order of the British Empire (MBE) by Queen Elizabeth II in the 1969 Birthday Honours for services to ice dancing, as well as awarded a spot in the World Figure Skating Hall of Fame in 1993.

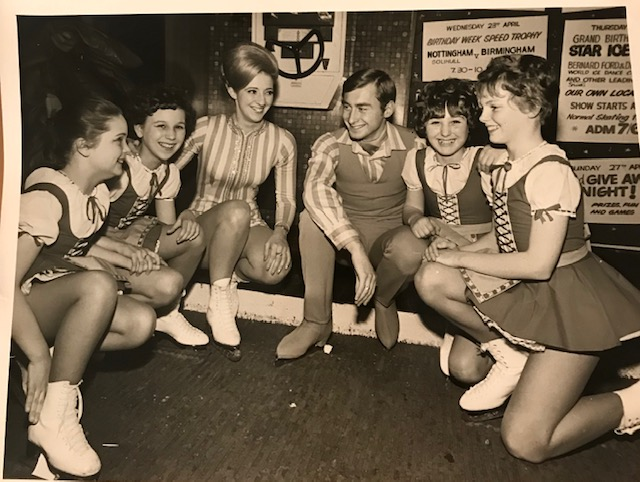

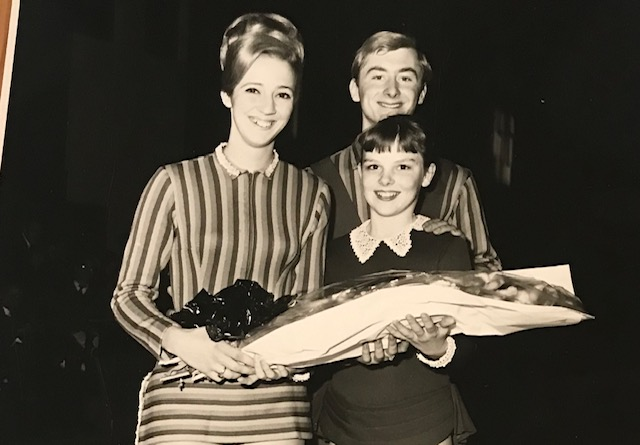

== Coaching career ==
Ford immigrated to Ontario, Canada in 1971 and coached numerous ice dance teams to national titles and international acclaim, most notably 1986 World bronze medalists Tracy Wilson / Rob McCall. His coaching success with Wilson / McCall earned him the Petro-Canada Coaching Excellence Award and the Longines-Wittnauer Coaching Excellence Award.

In 1986, Ford co-founded the York Region Skating Academy (YRSA) in Richmond Hill, Ontario. In 1989 at the YRSA, Ford invented the Cha-Cha Congelado, with assistance from coach Kelly Johnson and ice dance team Laurie Palmer / Steven Belanger. The Cha-Cha Congelado became an International Skating Union pattern dance. In 1999 the Town of Richmond Hill recognised Ford with an induction into the Richmond Hill Sports Hall of Fame. In 1994, Ford took a coaching position in Seattle, Washington, where he produced national champions and international competitors as well as coaching ice dance teams from Australia and Japan to World Championship competition.

Ford returned to Canada in 2003 and continued to coach ice dance teams to the national and international level. Over the years he had acted as a consultant to Skate Canada, United States Figure Skating, Professional Skaters Association and the ISU ice dance technical committee. He was an NCCP coaching course facilitator and conducted officials and coach teaching and training seminars for national sport organisations across the world. In January 2007, Skate Canada inducted Ford into the Skate Canada Hall of Fame.

== Personal life ==
Ford was educated at the King Edward VI Grammar School in Aston, Birmingham. Ford resided in Calgary, Alberta.

== Results ==
(with Diane Towler)

Event	1963–64	1964–65	1965–66	1966–67	1967–68	1968–69
World Championships	13th	4th	1st	1st	1st	1st
European Championships		4th	1st	1st	1st	1st
British Nationals		3rd	1st	1st	1st	1st
