= Wolfgang Schwarz =

Austrian figure skater

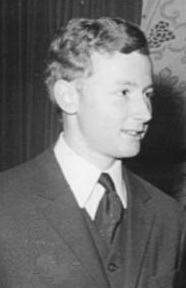
- Schwarz in 1966

Personal information
- Born: 14 September 1947 (age 78) Vienna, Austria

Figure skating career
- Country: Austria
- Retired: 1968
Medal record
Representing Austria
Figure skating: Men's singles
Winter Olympics
Gold medal – first place	1968 Grenoble	Men's singles
World Championships
Silver medal – second place	1967 Vienna	Men's singles
Silver medal – second place	1966 Davos	Men's singles
European Championships
Silver medal – second place	1968 Västerås	Men's singles
Silver medal – second place	1967 Ljubljana	Men's singles
Silver medal – second place	1966 Bratislava	Men's singles

Wolfgang Schwarz (born 14 September 1947, in Vienna) is an Austrian former figure skater. He is the 1968 Olympic gold medalist (one of the youngest male figure skating Olympic champions), a two-time (1967–1968) World silver medalist, and three-time (1967–1969) European silver medalist. Prior to the Grenoble Olympics, he had finished second to Austrian teammate Emmerich Danzer multiple times at the World and European Championships.

In December 2002, Schwarz was convicted on charges of trafficking in human beings after he brought five women from Russia and Lithuania to Austria to work as prostitutes. He was given an 18-month sentence, postponed due to his skin cancer. In December 2005, he was acquitted in a separate case of human trafficking. In August 2006, he was convicted and sentenced to eight years in prison for plotting a kidnapping of a Romanian teenager.

== Competitive highlights ==
Year	1964	1965	1966	1967	1968
Winter Olympics	15th				1st
World Championships		7th	2nd	2nd	
European Championships	7th	5th	2nd	2nd	2nd
