= John Carrell =

American ice dancer and ballet dancer

Personal information
- Full name: John Carrell
- Other names: John Aubrey
- Born: January 25, 1947
- Died: September 20, 1989
- Home town: Seattle

Figure skating career
- Country: United States
- Partner: Lorna Dyer
- Coach: Jean Westwood
- Skating club: Broadmoor SC
Medal record
Figure skating
Ice dancing
Representing the United States
World Championships
Silver medal – second place	1967 Vienna	Ice dancing
Bronze medal – third place	1966 Davos	Ice dancing
Bronze medal – third place	1965 Colorado Springs	Ice dancing
North American Championships
Gold medal – first place	1967 Montreal	Ice dancing
Gold medal – first place	1965 Rochester	Ice dancing

John Carrell (January 25, 1947 – September 20, 1989), later known as John Aubrey, was an American ice dancer and ballet dancer. With partner Lorna Dyer, he was the 1967 U.S. national champion. They were the 1967 World silver medalists and 1965–66 World bronze medalists.

He was adopted by James and Helen (Baldwin) Carrell, and grew up in Seattle. His father was a professor of speech and hearing at the University of Washington, and his mother was a speech therapist for the Seattle public schools.

After retiring from competitive skating, Carrell graduated from the University of Washington with a degree in political science. He spent some time coaching, but decided to reinvent himself as a ballet dancer.

From 1973 to 1980, he was known as John Aubrey, and was a member of the National Ballet of Canada.

Carrell died in 1989, from complications resulting from AIDS.

== Results ==
(with Lorna Dyer)

Event	1963	1964	1965	1966	1967
World Championships	8th	5th	3rd	3rd	2nd
North American Championships			1st		1st
U.S. Championships	3rd	3rd	2nd	2nd	1st
