= Thomas Litz =

American figure skater

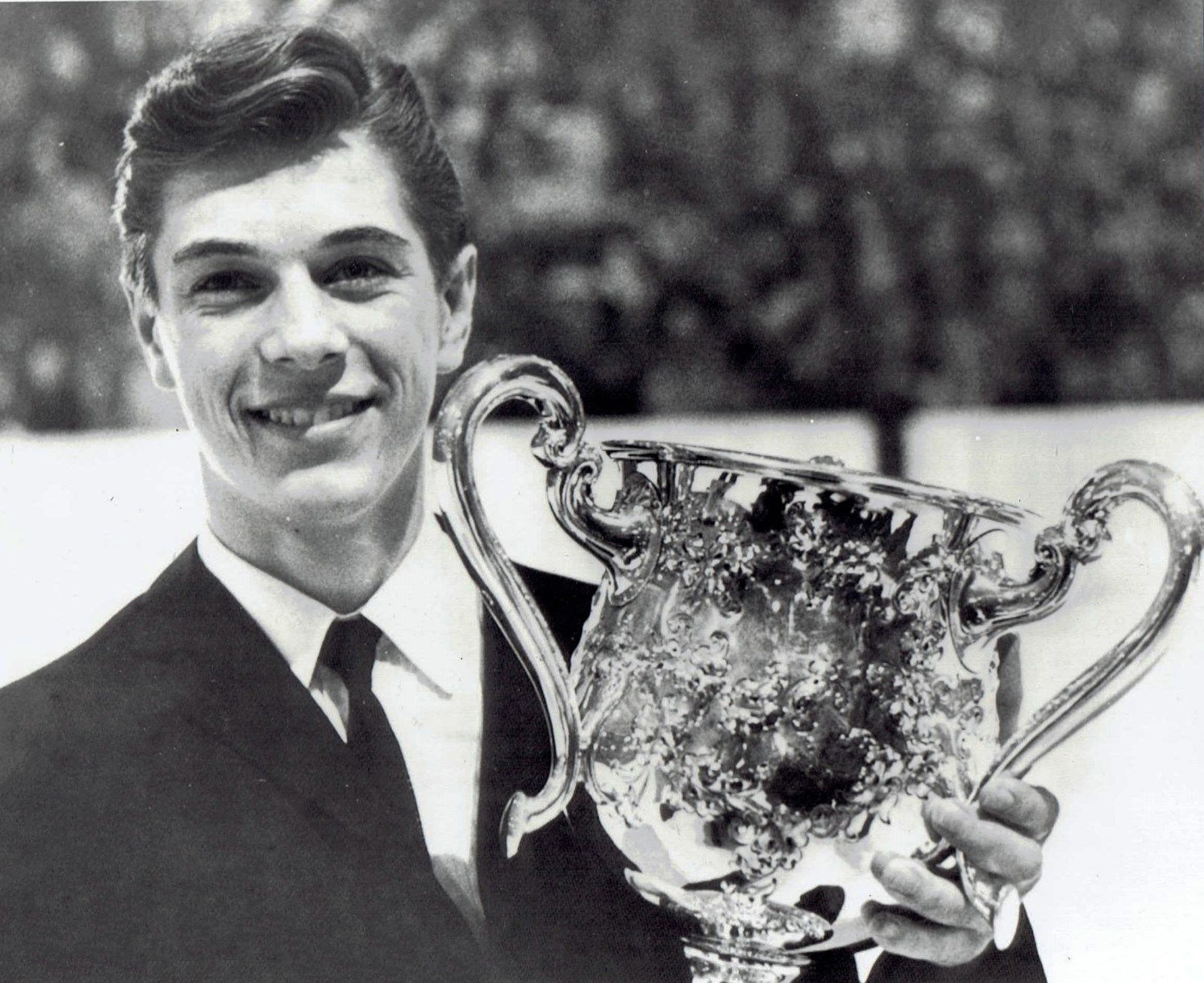
- Litz in February 1962

Personal information
- Born: March 14, 1945 (age 81) Allentown, Pennsylvania, U.S.
- Height: 174 cm (5 ft 9 in)

Figure skating career
- Country: United States
- Coach: Felix Kaspar
- Skating club: Hershey Figure Skating Club
Medal record
Representing United States
Figure skating
North American Championships
Silver medal – second place	1963 Vancouver	Singles

Thomas Litz (born March 14, 1945) is a retired American figure skater. He won the gold medal at the 1963 U.S. Figure Skating Championships and placed sixth at the 1964 Winter Olympics. Litz is credited as being the first skater to land the triple toe loop jump, a feat he accomplished at the 1964 World Figure Skating Championships.

Litz had to withdraw from the 1963 World Figure Skating Championships because of a sprained ankle. He coaches figure skating in Lake Placid, New York.

== Results ==
International
Event	1961	1962	1963	1964
Winter Olympics				6th
World Championships			WD	6th
North American Championships			2nd	
National
U.S. Championships	6th J	1st J	1st	2nd
J = Junior level; WD = Withdrew
