= Robert Munz =

American ice dancer

Robert John Munz (January 28, 1942 – February 9, 2010) was an American ice dancer. He competed with Carole MacSween. Their best results were in the 1964 season, when they won the silver medal at the United States Figure Skating Championships and placed 6th at the World Championships. They placed 4th at the 1965 U.S. Championships.

Prior to teaming up with MacSween, Munz previously competed with Susan Bright, with whom he won the junior-level championship at the 1962 United States Figure Skating Championships, and Joanne Leyden in the 1963 season.

Munz was the father of Olympic swimmer Diana Munz. He lived in Cleveland, Ohio.

== Results ==
=== Ice Dance ===
(with Bright)

| Event | 1961 | 1962 |
|---|---|---|
| U.S. Championships | 5th J. | 1st J. |

(with MacSween)

| Event | 1964 | 1965 |
|---|---|---|
| World Championships | 6th | |
| U.S. Championships | 2nd | 4th |
