= Jerry Fotheringill =

American pair skater

Personal information
- Full name: Jerry Joseph Fotheringill
- Born: March 7, 1942 (age 84) Tacoma, Washington
- Height: 5 ft 11 in (180 cm)

Figure skating career
- Country: United States
- Partner: Judianne Fotheringill
- Skating club: Broadmoor SC

Jerry Joseph Fotheringill (born March 7, 1942, in Tacoma, Washington) is an American former pair skater. With sister Judianne Fotheringill, he was the U.S. national champion in 1963 and 1964. They represented the United States at the 1964 Winter Olympics where they placed 7th.

The Fotheringills were originally from Tacoma, Washington, but later relocated to train in Colorado Springs, Colorado, where they represented the Broadmoor Skating Club. Jerry attended Colorado College, where he majored in psychology and political science, during the time he was competing. Jerry was 5 feet 11 inches or 180 centimetres tall and three years older than his sister, who was tall for a pair skater at 5 feet 7 inches or 170 centimetres.

== Competitive highlights ==
(with Judianne Fotheringill)

International
Event	1959	1960	1962	1963	1964
Winter Olympics					7th
World Championships			10th	7th	8th
North American Champ.				3rd	
National
U.S. Championships	1st J	5th	2nd	1st	1st
J = Junior level
