= Brigitte Martin =

French former figure skater

Figure skating career
- Country: France
- Partner: Francis Gamichon, Daniel Georget
- Retired: 1967
Medal record
Representing France
Figure skating: Ice dance
European Championships
Bronze medal – third place	1967 Ljubljana	Ice dance

Brigitte Martin is a French former figure skater who competed in ice dance. With her skating partner, Francis Gamichon, she won bronze at the 1967 European Figure Skating Championships in Ljubljana, Yugoslavia.

== Competitive highlights ==
=== With Francis Gamichon ===
International
Event	1964	1965	1966	1967
World Championships	15th	9th	5th	5th
European Championships	8th	8th	4th	3rd
National
French Championships	2nd	1st	1st	1st

=== With Daniel Georget ===
National
Event	1963
French Championships	3rd
