= Monty Hoyt =

American figure skater

Personal information
- Born: September 13, 1944 Baltimore, Maryland, U.S.
- Died: October 9, 1997 (aged 53) Phoenix, Arizona, U.S.
- Height: 6 ft 0 in (1.83 m)

Figure skating career
- Country: United States
- Discipline: Men's singles
- Skating club: Broadmoor SC

Monty Hoyt (September 13, 1944 in Baltimore, Maryland – October 9, 1997 in Phoenix, Arizona) was an American figure skater. He was the 1962 U.S. national champion, the 1961 Junior national champion, and the 1959 Novice national champion. He represented the United States at the 1964 Winter Olympics, where he placed 10th.

After winning the U.S. junior title in 1961, Hoyt had tickets to be on Sabena Flight 548 to attend the World Figure Skating Championships. He cancelled at the last moment, and so was not on the flight when the plane crashed, killing everyone aboard.

Hoyt graduated from the University of Denver and was a Marshall scholar at Oxford, graduating in PPE from Corpus Christi College in 1967. Later in life, Hoyt was a member of the Presidential Commission on Olympic Sports. He died of melanoma at age 53.

== Competitive highlights ==
International
Event	1959	1960	1961	1962	1963	1964
Winter Olympics						10th
World Championships				6th	11th	11th
National
U.S. Championships	1st N	5th J	1st J	1st	3rd	3rd
Levels: N = Novice; J = Junior
