= Ronald Joseph =

American figure skater (1944–2026)

Personal information
- Born: October 9, 1944 Chicago, Illinois, U.S.
- Died: January 20, 2026 (aged 81) Ponte Vedra Beach, Florida, U.S.
- Height: 5 ft 9 in (175 cm)

Figure skating career
- Country: United States
- Retired: 1965
Medal record
Representing United States
Figure skating: Pairs
Olympic Games
Bronze medal – third place	1964 Innsbruck	Pairs
World Championships
Silver medal – second place	1965 Colorado Springs	Pairs
North American Championships
Gold medal – first place	1965 Rochester	Pairs
Bronze medal – third place	1963 Vancouver	Pairs

Ronald Joseph (October 9, 1944 – January 20, 2026) was an American pair skater who competed with his sister, Vivian Joseph. They were the 1964 Olympic bronze medalists, 1965 World silver medalists, and 1965 North American champions.

== Background ==
Joseph was born in Chicago, Illinois, on October 9, 1944, and was the elder brother of Vivian Joseph. He was Jewish until converting to Catholicism before his death. He worked as a hand surgeon in Arizona and Florida.

He married St. Johns County Commissioner Krista Keating in 1993 and they had one daughter. He lived in Ponte Vedra Beach, Florida.

Joseph was diagnosed with amyotrophic lateral sclerosis in 2023. He died on January 20, 2026, at the age of 81.

== Career ==
The skating pair of Vivian and Ron Joseph began competing together by the late 1950s and became the U.S. national junior champions in 1961. They won the senior bronze medal in 1962 and silver the following year. They were assigned to the 1963 North American Championships, where they took the bronze medal, and to the 1963 World Championships, where they placed eighth.

The Josephs were selected to represent the United States at the 1964 Winter Olympics in Innsbruck and initially finished fourth. A few years later, the silver medalists, Marika Kilius / Hans-Jürgen Bäumler of Germany, were disqualified after they were accused of signing a pro contract before the Olympics. The original bronze medalists, Debbi Wilkes / Guy Revell of Canada, were elevated to silver and the Joseph siblings to bronze. When the German pair was reinstated in 1987, the IOC decided the Germans and Canadians were both silver medalists and the Americans remained bronze medalists. The IOC officially updated the results in November 2014.

Vivian and Ron won the national senior title in 1965. They then took gold at the 1965 North American Championships and silver at the 1965 World Championships before retiring from competition. They were coached by Peter Dunfield.

== Results ==
(Pairs with Vivian Joseph)

International
Event	1960	1961	1962	1963	1964	1965
Winter Olympics					3rd	
World Championships				8th	4th	2nd
North American Championships				3rd		1st
National
U.S. Championships	2nd J.	1st J.	3rd	2nd	2nd	1st
J. = Junior level

== See also ==
- List of select Jewish figure skaters
