= Lorna Dyer =

American ice dancer

Personal information
- Full name: Lorna Dyer
- Born: July 3, 1945 (age 81) Seattle, Washington

Figure skating career
- Country: United States
- Partner: John Carrell
- Coach: Jean Westwood
- Skating club: Broadmoor SC
Medal record
Figure skating
Ice dancing
Representing the United States
World Championships
Silver medal – second place	1967 Vienna	Ice dancing
Bronze medal – third place	1966 Davos	Ice dancing
Bronze medal – third place	1965 Colorado Springs	Ice dancing
North American Championships
Gold medal – first place	1967 Montreal	Ice dancing
Gold medal – first place	1965 Rochester	Ice dancing

Lorna Dyer (born July 3, 1945) is an American ice dancer. With partner John Carrell, she is the 1967 U.S. national champion. They are the 1967 World silver medalists and 1965–1966 World bronze medalists.

After retiring from competitive skating, Lorna graduated from the University of Washington with a degree in Biology and married Jerry Watts. Lorna taught high school science for over 30 years, and was the Washington State Outstanding Biology Teacher of the year and was a candidate for the 1985 NASA Teacher in Space. She spent summer breaks in Sun Valley, Idaho teaching skating. In 1980, she wrote "Ice Dancing Illustrated", an instructional book of technical information for dance compulsories learned from coach Jean Westwood. She is retired and resides in Santa Fe, New Mexico with her husband.

== Results ==
(with King Cole)

Event	1962
U.S. Championships	3rd

(with John Carrell)

Event	1963	1964	1965	1966	1967
World Championships	8th	5th	3rd	3rd	2nd
North American Championships			1st		1st
U.S. Championships	3rd	3rd	2nd	2nd	1st
