= Dennis Sveum (figure skater) =

American ice dancer

Personal information
- Full name: Dennis Sveum

Figure skating career
- Country: United States
- Partner: Kristin Fortune
- Skating club: Los Angeles FSC
Medal record
Figure skating
Ice dancing
Representing the United States
World Championships
Silver medal – second place	1966 Davos	Ice dancing
North American Championships
Silver medal – second place	1965 Rochester	Ice dancing

Dennis Sveum is an American ice dancer. With partner Kristin Fortune, he is the 1965 and 1966 U.S. national champion. They won the silver medal at the 1966 World Figure Skating Championships.

Fortune and Sveum were coached by Jean Westwood and Charles Phillips.

== Results ==
(with Kristin Fortune)

Event	1965	1966
World Championships	5th	2nd
North American Championships	2nd	
U.S. Championships	1st	1st
