= Judianne Fotheringill =

American pair skater

Personal information
- Full name: Judianne Fotheringill
- Born: July 21, 1944 (age 81) Chehalis, Washington
- Height: 170 cm (5 ft 7 in)

Figure skating career
- Country: United States
- Partner: Jerry Fotheringill
- Skating club: Broadmoor SC

Judianne Fotheringill (born July 21, 1944, in Chehalis, Washington) is an American pair skater. With brother Jerry Fotheringill, she is the 1963 and 1964 U.S. national champion. They represented the United States at the 1964 Winter Olympics where they placed 7th.

The Fotheringills were originally from Tacoma, Washington but later relocated to train in Colorado Springs, Colorado, where they represented the Broadmoor Skating Club. Judi attended Colorado College during the time she was competing. She was tall for a pair skater at 5 ft 7 in (170 cm). Her brother, three years her senior, was 5 ft 11 in (180 cm).

== Competitive highlights ==
(with Jerry Fotheringill)

International
Event	1959	1960	1962	1963	1964
Winter Olympics					7th
World Championships			10th	7th	8th
North American Champ.				3rd	
National
U.S. Championships	1st J	5th	2nd	1st	1st
J = Junior level
