= Francis Gamichon =

French former figure skater (born 1941)

Figure skating career
- Country: France
- Partner: Brigitte Martin; Ghislaine Houdas (Bertrand-Houdas)
Medal record
Representing France
Figure skating: Ice dance
European Championships
Bronze medal – third place	1967 Ljubljana	Ice dance

Francis Gamichon (born 1941) is a French former figure skater who competed in ice dance. With his skating partner, Brigitte Martin, he won bronze at the 1967 European Figure Skating Championships in Ljubljana, Yugoslavia.

== Competitive highlights ==
=== With Brigitte Martin ===
International
Event	1964	1965	1966	1967
World Championships	15th	9th	5th	5th
European Championships	8th	8th	4th	3rd
National
French Championships	2nd	1st	1st	1st

=== With Ghislaine Houdas (Bertrand-Houdas) ===
International
Event	1962	1963
World Championships		16th
European Championships		8th
National
French Championships	3rd	2nd
