= Gary Visconti =

American former figure skater

Personal information
- Born: May 10, 1945 (age 81) Detroit, Michigan, U.S.

Figure skating career
- Country: United States
Medal record
Men's figure skating
Representing United States
World Championships
Bronze medal – third place	1967 Vienna	Men's singles
Bronze medal – third place	1966 Davos	Men's singles
North American Championships
Bronze medal – third place	1967 Montreal	Men's singles
Gold medal – first place	1965 Rochester	Men's singles

Gary Charles Visconti (born May 10, 1945 in Detroit, Michigan) is an American former figure skater. He won the gold medal at the U.S. Figure Skating Championships twice, and captured the bronze medal at the World Figure Skating Championships twice. He served as president of the SoCal Olympians from 1986 to 1990. For many years following his retirement from active competition, he worked as a coach in West Los Angeles.

More recently, he has focused on refining his artistic skills as a painter and has worked on an exhibit with Art of the Olympians.

== Results ==
Event	1961	1962	1963	1964	1965	1966	1967	1968	1969
Winter Olympics								5th	
World Championships					6th	3rd	3rd	5th	4th
North American Championships					1st		3rd		
U.S. Championships	5th J.		4th	4th	1st	2nd	1st	2nd	3rd
