= Paul Huehnergard =

Canadian pair skater

Figure skating career
- Country: Canada
Medal record
Representing Canada
Pairs' Figure skating
North American Championships
Bronze medal – third place	1965 Rochester	Pairs

Paul Huehnergard is a former Canadian pairs figure skater with partner Susan Huehnergard. He is the 1965 and 1966 national champion.

== Results ==
(with Huehnergard)

Event	1963	1964	1965	1966
World Championships			14th	13th
North American Championships			3rd	
Canadian Championships	3rd J	1st J	1st	1st
