= Stanley Urban =

American former ice dancer

Personal information
- Full name: Stanley T. Urban, III
- Born: January 29, 1945 Buffalo, New York
- Died: June 1, 2026 (aged 81)

Figure skating career
- Country: United States
- Partner: Susan Urban; Sally Schantz; Wilma Piper
Medal record
Figure skating
Ice dancing
Representing the United States
North American Championships
Bronze medal – third place	1963 Vancouver	Ice dancing

Stanley Urban was an American ice dancer. With Sally Schantz, he won the 1963 U.S. Championships, and later won a further two medals at the U.S. Championships competing with his sister Susan Urban.

Urban, who was from Buffalo, New York, was a student at Boston College at the time he competed with Schantz. They were unable to defend their national title in 1964 because Urban was injured playing intramural football and had his leg in a cast for seven weeks. Schantz decided to turn professional at that time to take a coaching position. The following season, Urban returned to competition partnered with his sister Susan.

Urban died in 2026, and was survived by wife of 58 years and former skating partner, Sally.

== Results ==
(with Wilma Piper)

Event	1960	1961
U.S. Championships	4th J.	4th J.

(with Sally Schantz)

Event	1963
World Championships	7th
North American Championships	3rd
U.S. Championships	1st

(with Susan Urban)

Event	1965	1966
World Championships	7th	11th
North American Championships	4th	
U.S. Championships	3rd	3rd
