= Venues of the 1968 Winter Olympics =

For the 1968 Winter Olympics in Grenoble, France, a total of ten sports venues were used. Most venues were constructed between the 1964 Winter Games in Innsbruck and the 1968 Games. Thawing was an issue for the four-man bobsleigh run. They were limited to only two runs. Thawing also affected the men's 500 m speed skating event. Electronic timing in alpine skiing affected the results of the women's giant slalom event. It gave Canada's Nancy Greene a headache for two days despite her gold medal in the event.

== Venues ==
Venue	Sports	Capacity	Ref.
Autrans	Biathlon, Cross-country skiing, Nordic combined, Ski jumping (normal hill)	40,000 (ski jump)	
Chamrousse	Alpine skiing (men)	Not listed.	
La Patinoire Municipale	Ice hockey	2,700	
L'Anneau de Vitesse	Speed skating	2,500	
Le Stade de Glace	Closing ceremonies, Figure skating, Ice hockey	12,000	
Piste de Bobsleigh	Bobsleigh	Not listed.	
Piste de Luge	Luge	Not listed.	
Recoin de Chamrousse	Alpine skiing (women)	Not listed.	
Saint-Nizier-du-Moucherotte	Ski jumping (large hill)	50,000	
Olympic Stadium (Grenoble)	Opening ceremonies	60,000	

== Before the Olympics ==
In 1960, a local paper informed the public in Grenoble that it was making a bid for the 1968 Winter Olympics. They were awarded those games on 28 January 1964 in Innsbruck, the day before the start of the 1964 Winter Olympics. La Patinoire Municipale was constructed in 1963 for the Brûleurs de Loups hockey team. It hosted the European Figure Skating Championships the following year.

In 1965, an aggressive construction scheduled was established using Program Evaluation and Review Technique that was used for both venue construction and all of the support systems, including transportation, communications, and public works to ensure all venues were completed in a timely manner. Le Stade de Glace was the last venue completed, having been done so in November 1967.

Alpe d'Huez hosted the Bobsleigh World Championships in 1967 though the four-man event was cancelled due to warm temperatures causing the ice to melt. This was fixed by adding more refrigeration to the exposed area of the track to reduce melting.

== During the Olympics ==
Thawing ice affected several events at these games. In the men's 500 m speed skating event, American Terry McDermott drew the last of the 24 pairs on ice that had badly melted despite artificial refrigeration. McDermott tied for silver with Norwegian Magne Thomassen in the event. Thawing also limited the bobsleigh four-man event to two runs.

Bad weather limited the men's single luge event to three runs instead of four. It also affected the women's single luge event, but the three East Germans were disqualified for heating their luge runners illegally. Another event affected by bad weather was the alpine skiing men's slalom event where Austrian Karl Schranz was disqualified for missing two gates during his initial run in fog before he stopped at the 21st gate and demanded a rerun.

Electronic timekeeping had debuted in alpine skiing at the previous Winter Olympics. Omega and Longines were the official timekeepers of the 1968 Games. The reliability of the timing had athletes on their toes when they completed their performances. The most notable incident of the 1968 Winter Olympics which involved electronic timing took place with the women's alpine skiing giant slalom event. Canada's Nancy Greene had skied a perfect race, but when she turned around to look at the stop clock, the numbers were still moving. It took two or three seconds to correct the stop clock malfunction. Greene thought originally that the officials missed her time, causing her blood pressure to rise to the point that she had a headache for two days. Her margin of victory was 3.24 seconds over France's Annie Famose.

== After the Olympics ==
Autrans remains a popular skiing venue, having started in 1896 and continuing to do so as of 2010. Chamrousse is a popular skiing venue. La Patinoire Municipale was renamed Halle Clemenceau in 2001, the last year the Grenoble Hockey Club played before moving into a new sports arena.

Le Stade de Glace continues to host sporting events and musical concerts as of 2010. Alpe d'Huez's bobsleigh track is no longer in use, having last run in 1972. Since 1976, the city is a popular mountain stage in the Tour de France. Villard-de-Lans's luge track is no longer in use, but the city remains a tourist attraction.
