= List of Olympic venues in hockey =

List of Olympic venues in hockey may refer to

- List of Olympic venues in ice hockey
- List of Olympic venues in field hockey
