= List of Winter Olympics venues: L =

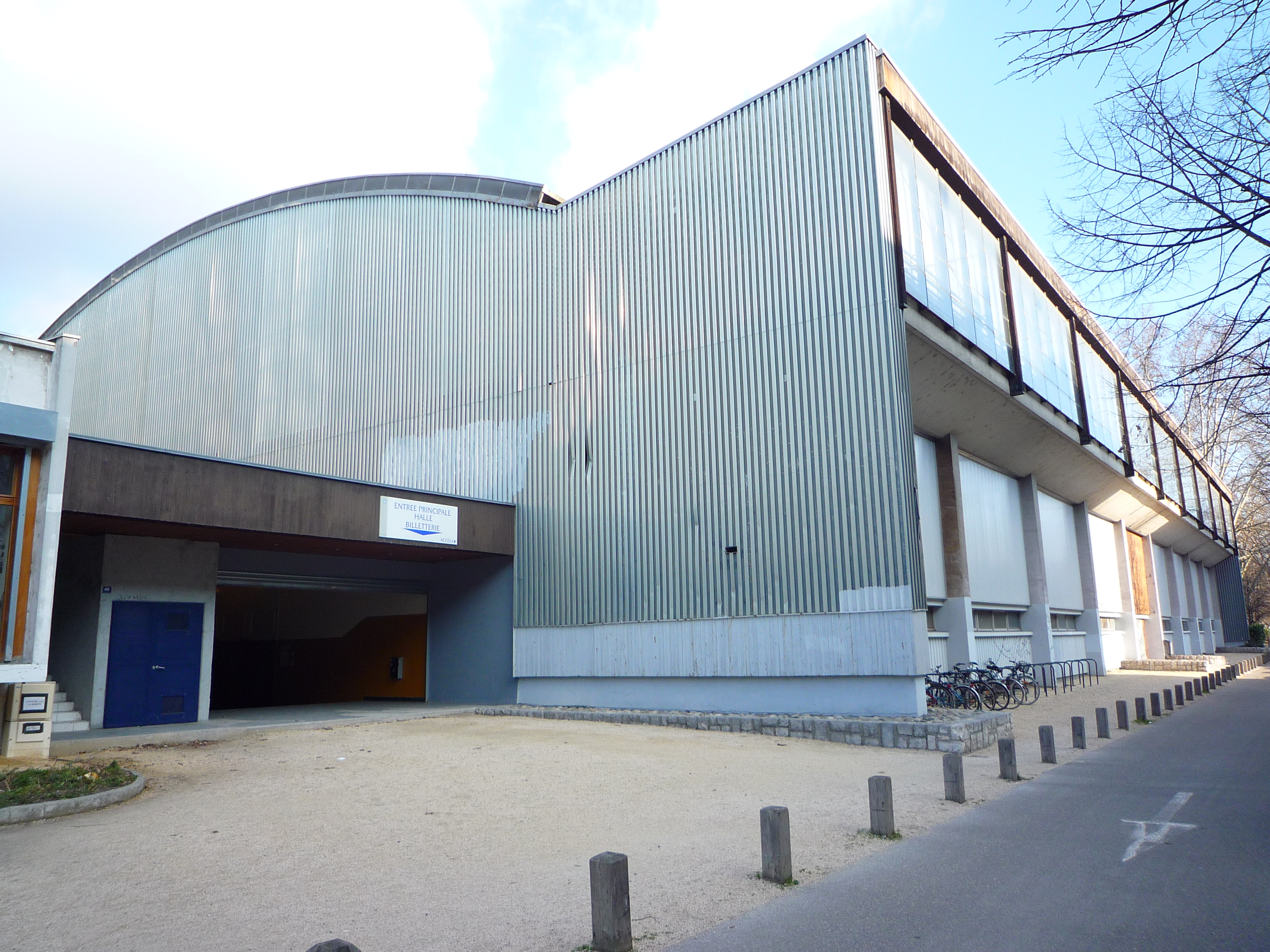
La Patinoire Municipale (Halle Clemenceau since 2001) hosted some of the ice hockey matches for the 1968 Winter Olympics in Grenoble.

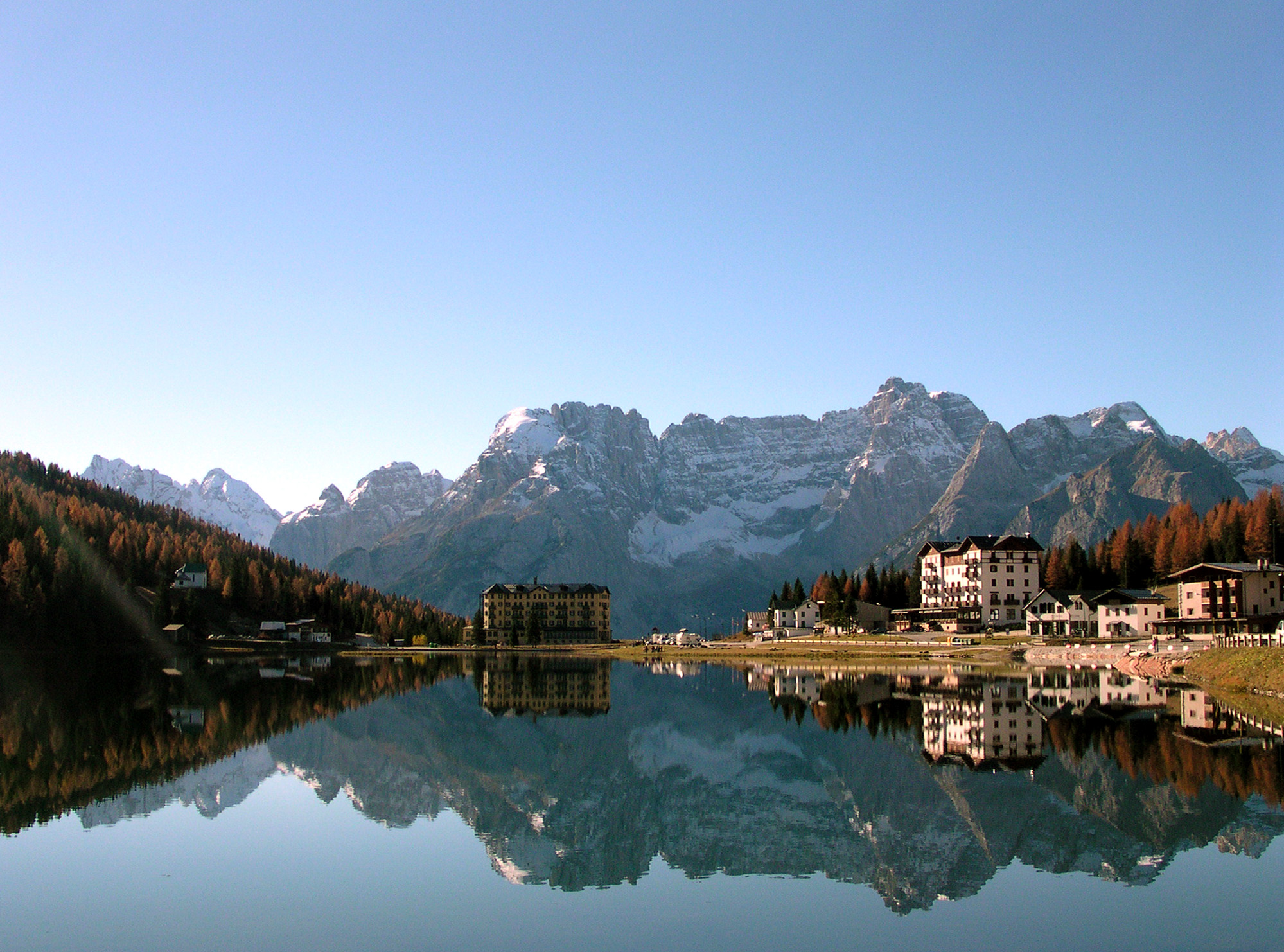
Lake Misurina in 2005. The venue hosted the speed skating events for the 1956 Winter Olympics in Cortina d'Ampezzo.

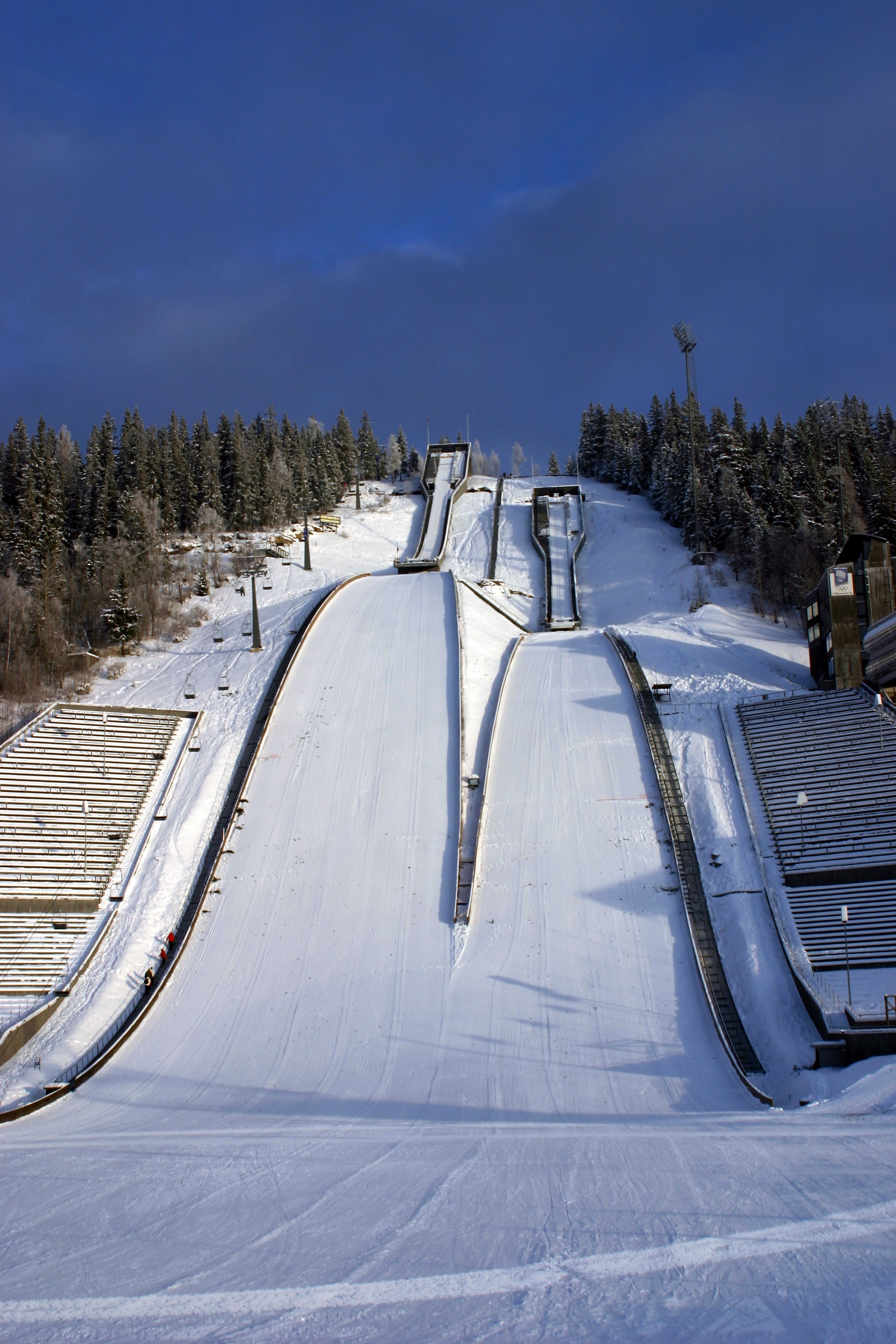
Lysgårdsbakkene Ski Jumping Arena hosted the ski jumping, Nordic combined ski jumping, and ceremonies for the 1994 Winter Olympics in Lillehammer.

For the Winter Olympics, there are 23 venues that start with the letter 'L'.

Venue	Games	Sports	Capacity	Ref.
La halle de glace Olympique	1992 Albertville	Figure skating, Short track speed skating	9,000	
La Patinoire Municipale	1968 Grenoble	Ice hockey	2,700	
La piste bob	1956 Cortina d'Ampezzo	Bobsleigh	4,650	
La Piste de Bobsleigh des Pellerins	1924 Chamonix	Bobsleigh	Not listed.	
La pista di Misurina	1956 Cortina d'Ampezzo	Speed skating	8,550	
La Plagne	1992 Albertville	Bobsleigh, Luge	Not listed.	
L'Anneau de Vitesse	1968 Grenoble	Speed skating	2,500	
L'anneau de vitesse	1992 Albertville	Speed skating	10,000	
Lake Placid	1932 Lake Placid	Cross-country skiing, Nordic combined (cross-country skiing)	Not listed.	
Lake Placid Equestrian Stadium	1980 Lake Placid	Opening ceremonies	Not listed.	
Lake Placid Olympic Sports Complex Cross Country Biathlon Center	1980 Lake Placid	Biathlon, Cross-country skiing, Nordic combined (Cross-country skiing)	Not listed.	
Le Stade de Glace	1968 Grenoble	Closing ceremonies, Figure skating, Ice hockey	12,000	
Le Tremplin Olympique du Mont	1924 Chamonix	Nordic combined (ski jumping), Ski jumping	Not listed.	
Les Arcs	1992 Albertville	Speed skiing (demonstration)	Not listed.	
Les Ménuires	1992 Albertville	Alpine skiing (men's slalom)	Not listed.	
Les Saisies	1992 Albertville	Biathlon, Cross-country skiing	12,500	
Lillehammer Olympic Alpine Centre Hafjell	1994 Lillehammer	Alpine skiing (slalom, giant slalom, combined)	Not listed.	
Lillehammer Olympic Alpine Centre Kvitfjell	1994 Lillehammer	Alpine skiing (downhill, super giant slalom, combined)	Not listed.	
Lillehammer Olympic Bobsleigh and Luge Track	1994 Lillehammer	Bobsleigh, Luge	10,000	
Lillestrøm Stadion	1952 Oslo	Ice hockey	Not listed	
Lo Stadio del ghiaccio	1956 Cortina d'Ampezzo	Figure skating, Ice hockey	12,042	
Lo Stadio della neve	1956 Cortina d'Ampezzo	Cross-country skiing, Nordic combined (cross-country skiing)	9,650	
Lysgårdsbakkene Ski Jumping Arena	1994 Lillehammer	Nordic combined (Ski jumping), Ski jumping, Ceremonies (opening/closing)	35,000	
