= Györgyi Korda =

Hungarian figure skater

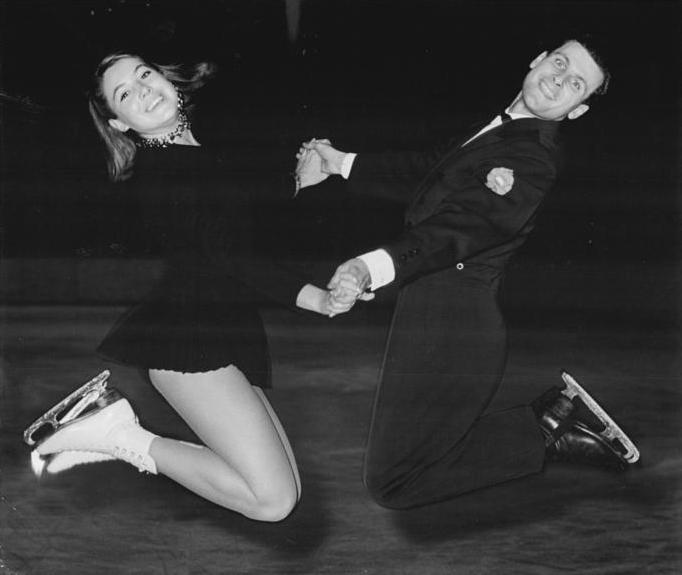
- Korda and Vásárhelyi in 1964

Figure skating career
- Country: Hungary
- Partner: Pál Vásárhelyi
- Retired: c. 1965

Györgyi Korda is a Hungarian former ice dancer. With Pál Vásárhelyi, she is the 1964 Winter Universiade champion, the 1964 Blue Swords champion, and a seven-time Hungarian national champion. The duo competed at four World and six European Championships. They placed among the European top five in 1963 (Budapest, Hungary), 1964 (Grenoble, France), and 1965 (Moscow, Soviet Union).

== Competitive highlights ==
With Vásárhelyi

International
Event	58–59	59–60	60–61	61–62	62–63	63–64	64–65
World Champ.				10th	9th	9th	10th
European Champ.		13th	11th	12th	4th	4th	5th
Blue Swords							1st
Winter Universiade						1st	
National
Hungarian Champ.	1st	1st	1st	1st	1st	1st	1st
