= List of Olympic venues in ice hockey =

For the Summer and Winter Olympics, there are 46 venues that have been or will be used for ice hockey. The 46 venues are the most for any Winter Olympic sport. The first venue ice hockey took place in was indoor during the Summer Olympics in 1920. Twelve years later, ice hockey was held both indoors and outdoors. The plan was to have two of the twelve matches for those games played indoors, but thawing ice at the outdoor venue for those games forced four of the outdoor games to be moved indoors in 1932. Despite the success of indoor ice hockey venues at the 1932 Winter Olympics, it would be twenty years before another indoor venue would be used. Ice hockey would not be indoors entirely until the 1964 Games, which it has remained as ever since.

Games	Venue	Locations	Other sports hosted at venue for these games	Capacity	Ref.
1920 Antwerp	Palais de Glace d'Anvers	Indoor	Figure skating	Not listed.	
1924 Chamonix	Stade Olympique de Chamonix	Outdoor	Cross-country skiing, Curling, Figure skating, Military patrol, Nordic combined (cross-country skiing), Speed skating	45,000	
1928 St. Moritz	St. Moritz Olympic Ice Rink	Outdoor	Figure skating, Speed skating	4,000	
1932 Lake Placid	Jack Shea Arena (final)	Indoor	Figure skating	3,360	
1932 Lake Placid	Olympic Stadium	Outdoor	Speed skating	7,475	
1936 Garmisch-Partenkirchen	Olympia-Kunsteisstadion (final)	Outdoor	Figure skating	17,000	
1936 Garmisch-Partenkirchen	Riessersee	Outdoor	Bobsleigh, Speed skating	17,940 (Bobsleigh), 16,000 (Ice hockey, Speed skating)	
1948 St. Moritz	Kulm	Outdoor	None	Not listed.	
1948 St. Moritz	Olympic Stadium (final)	Outdoor	Figure skating, Speed skating	Not listed.	
1948 St. Moritz	Suvretta	Outdoor	None	Not listed.	
1952 Oslo	Dæhlenenga	Outdoor	Bandy (demonstration)	Not listed	
1952 Oslo	Jordal Amfi (final)	Indoor	None	10,000	
1952 Oslo	Kadettangen	Outdoor	None	Not listed.	
1952 Oslo	Lillestrøm stadion	Outdoor	None	Not listed.	
1952 Oslo	Marienlyst stadion	Outdoor	None	Not listed.	
1956 Cortina d'Ampezzo	Apollonio Stadium	Indoor	None	2,000	
1956 Cortina d'Ampezzo	Olympic Ice Stadium (final)	Outdoor	Figure skating	12,042	
1960 Squaw Valley	Blyth Arena (final)	Indoor	Figure skating	8,500	
1960 Squaw Valley	Squaw Valley Olympic Skating Rink	Outdoor	Speed skating	Not listed.	
1964 Innsbruck	Messehalle	Indoor	None	5,544	
1964 Innsbruck	Olympiahalle (final)	Indoor	Figure skating	10,836	
1968 Grenoble	La Patinoire Municipale	Indoor	None	2,700	
1968 Grenoble	Le Stade de Glace (final)	Indoor	Closing ceremony, Figure skating	12,000	
1972 Sapporo	Makomanai Ice Arena (final)	Indoor	Figure skating (final), closing ceremonies	2,700	
1972 Sapporo	Tsukisamu Indoor Skating Rink	Indoor	None	6,000	
1976 Innsbruck	Messehalle	Indoor	None	Not listed.	
1976 Innsbruck	Olympiahalle (final)	Indoor	Figure skating	Not listed.	
1980 Lake Placid	Olympic Center	Indoor	Figure skating	8,500 (ice hockey); 2,000 (figure skating)	
1984 Sarajevo	Skenderija II Hall	Indoor	Figure skating	15,000	
1984 Sarajevo	Zetra Ice Hall (final)	Indoor	Closing ceremonies, Figure skating	15,000	
1988 Calgary	Father David Bauer Olympic Arena	Indoor	None	2,000	
1988 Calgary	Olympic Saddledome (final)	Indoor	Figure skating (final)	16,605	
1988 Calgary	Stampede Corral	Indoor	Figure skating	6,475	
1992 Albertville	Méribel Ice Palace	Indoor	None	6,420	
1994 Lillehammer	Gjøvik Olympic Cavern Hall	Indoor	None	5,300	
1994 Lillehammer	Håkon Hall (final)	Indoor	None	10,500	
1998 Nagano	Aqua Wing	Indoor	None	6,000	
1998 Nagano	Big Hat (final)	Indoor	None	10,104	
2002 Salt Lake City	E Center (final)	Indoor	None	10,500	
2002 Salt Lake City	Peaks Ice Arena	Indoor	None	8,400	
2006 Turin	Palasport Olimpico (final)	Indoor	None	12,500	
2006 Turin	Torino Esposizioni	Indoor	None	5,400	
2010 Vancouver	Canada Hockey Place (final)	Indoor	None	18,630	
2010 Vancouver	UBC Thunderbird Arena	Indoor	None	7,200	
2014 Sochi	Bolshoy Ice Dome (final)	Indoor	None	12,000	
2014 Sochi	Shayba Arena	Indoor	None	7,000	
2018 PyeongChang	Gangneung Hockey Centre (final)	Indoor	None	10,000	
2018 PyeongChang	Kwandong Hockey Centre	Indoor	None	6,000	
2022 Beijing	Beijing National Indoor Stadium (men's final)	Indoor	None	18,000	
2022 Beijing	Wukesong Arena (women's final)	Indoor	None	9,000	
2026 Milan-Cortina	PalaItalia (finals)	Indoor	None	11,800	
2026 Milan-Cortina	Milan Ice Park	Indoor	None	5,800	
2030 Alpes	OL Arena (finals)	Indoor	None	10,500-11,000	
2030 Alpes	Halle Tony Garnier	Indoor	None	TBA	
2034 Utah	Salt Lake Ice Center (finals)	Indoor	None	16,020	
2034 Utah	Peaks Ice Arena	Indoor	None	10,000	

== Gallery of venues ==
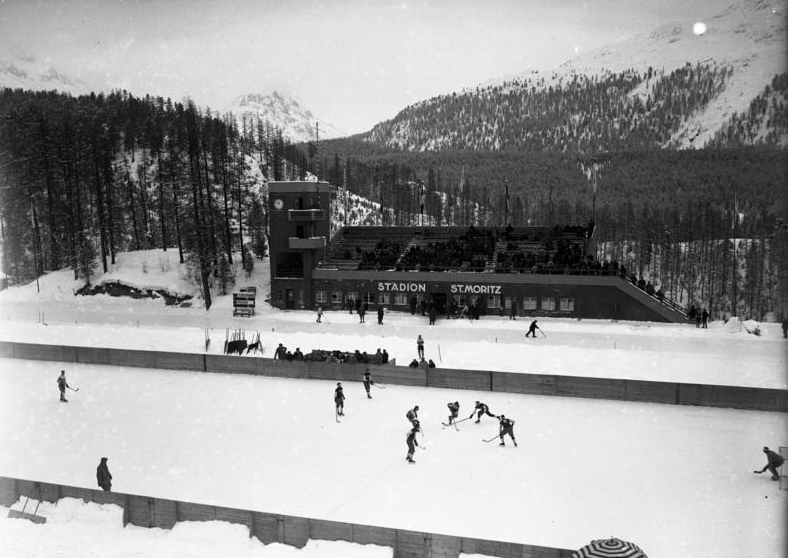
St. Moritz Olympic Ice Rink hosted ice hockey at the 1928 and 1948 Winter Olympics.

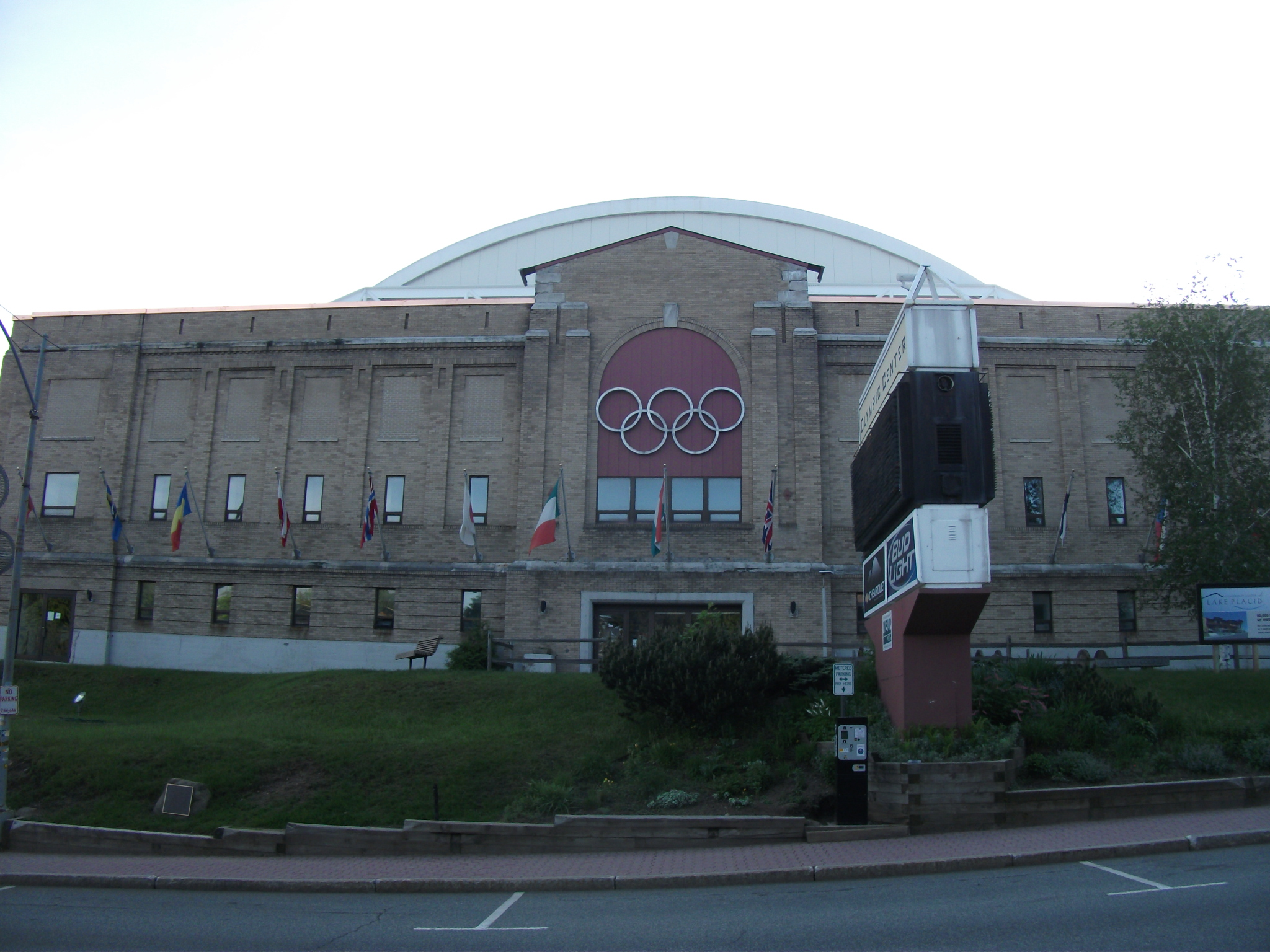
Jack Shea Arena at the Olympic Center hosted ice hockey at the 1932 Winter Olympics in Lake Placid.

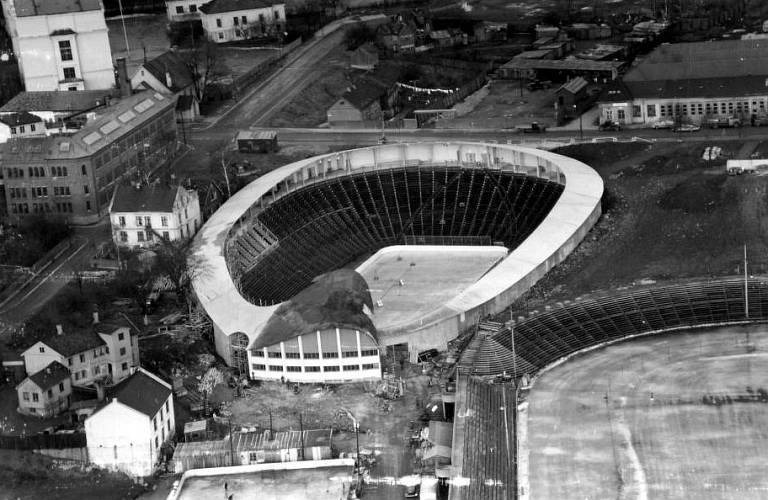
Jordal Amfi hosted ice hockey at the 1952 Winter Olympics in Oslo.

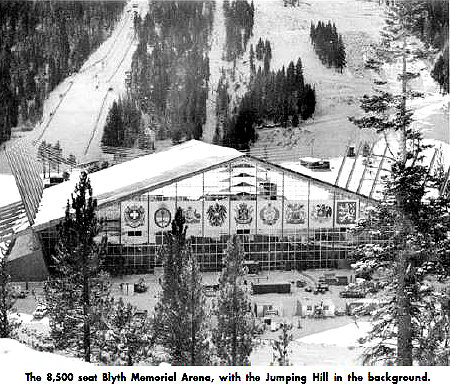
Blyth Arena hosted ice hockey at the 1960 Winter Olympics in Squaw Valley.

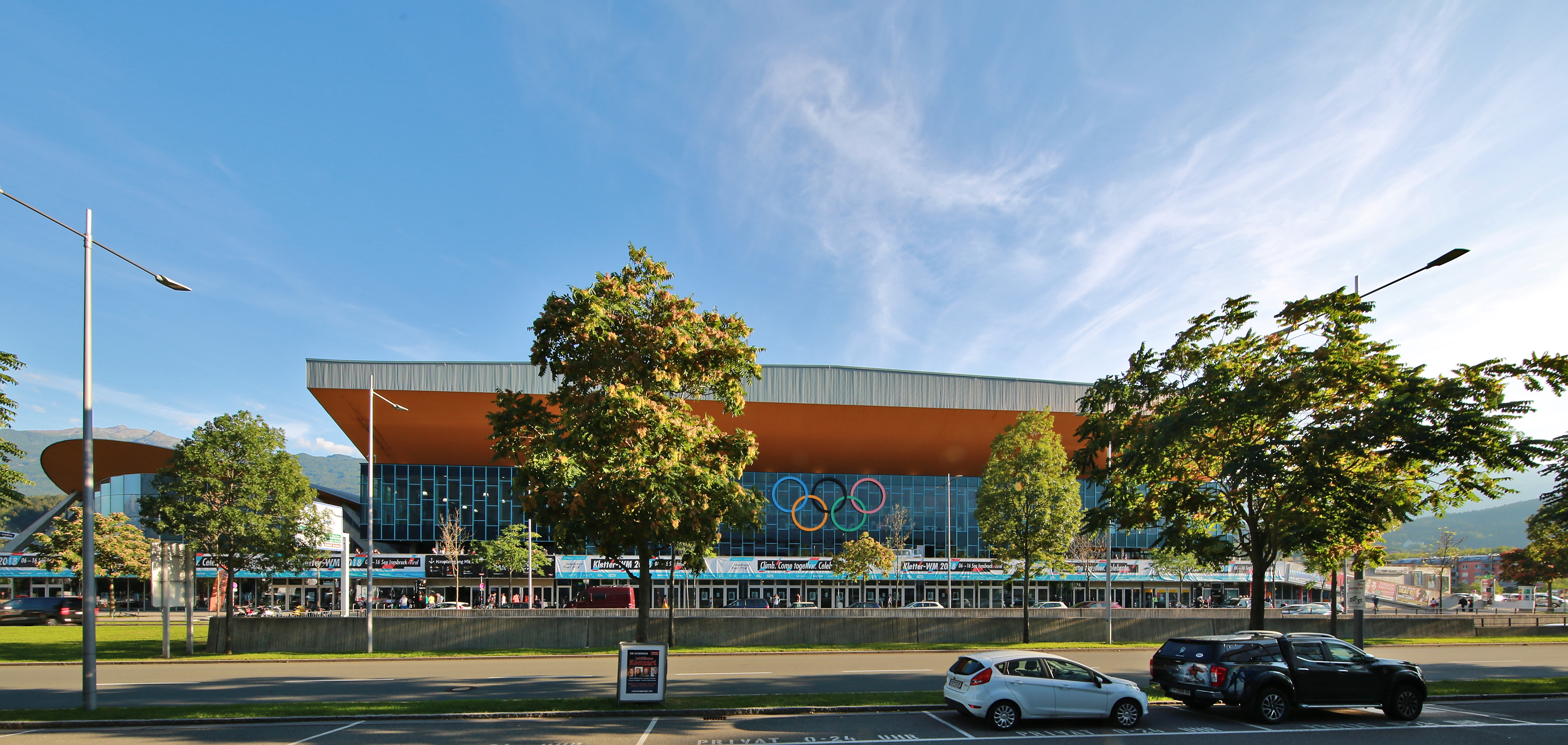
Olympiahalle hosted ice hockey at the 1964 and 1976 Winter Olympics in Innsbruck.

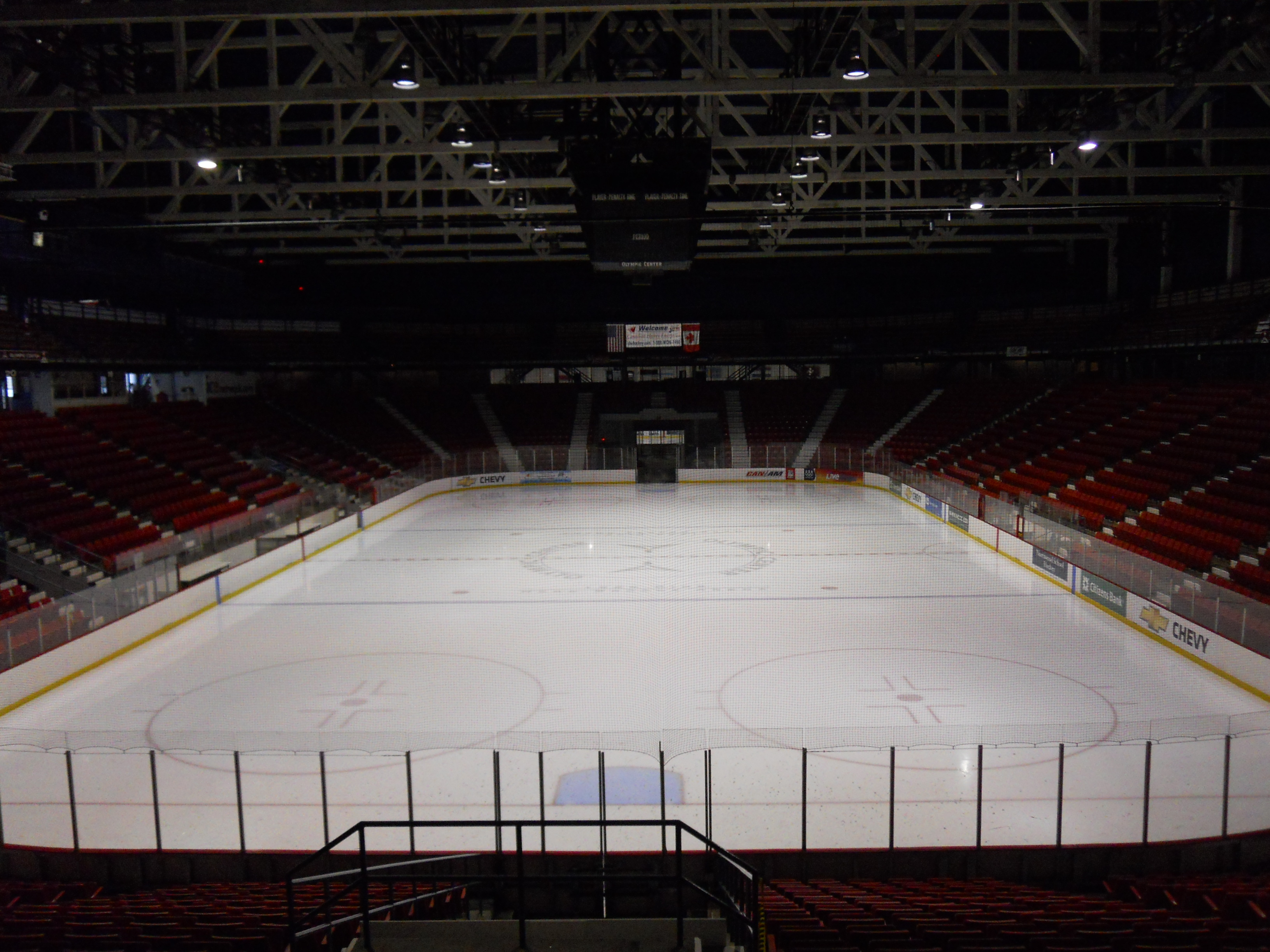
The Herb Brooks Arena at the Olympic Center hosted ice hockey at the 1980 Winter Olympics in Lake Placid.

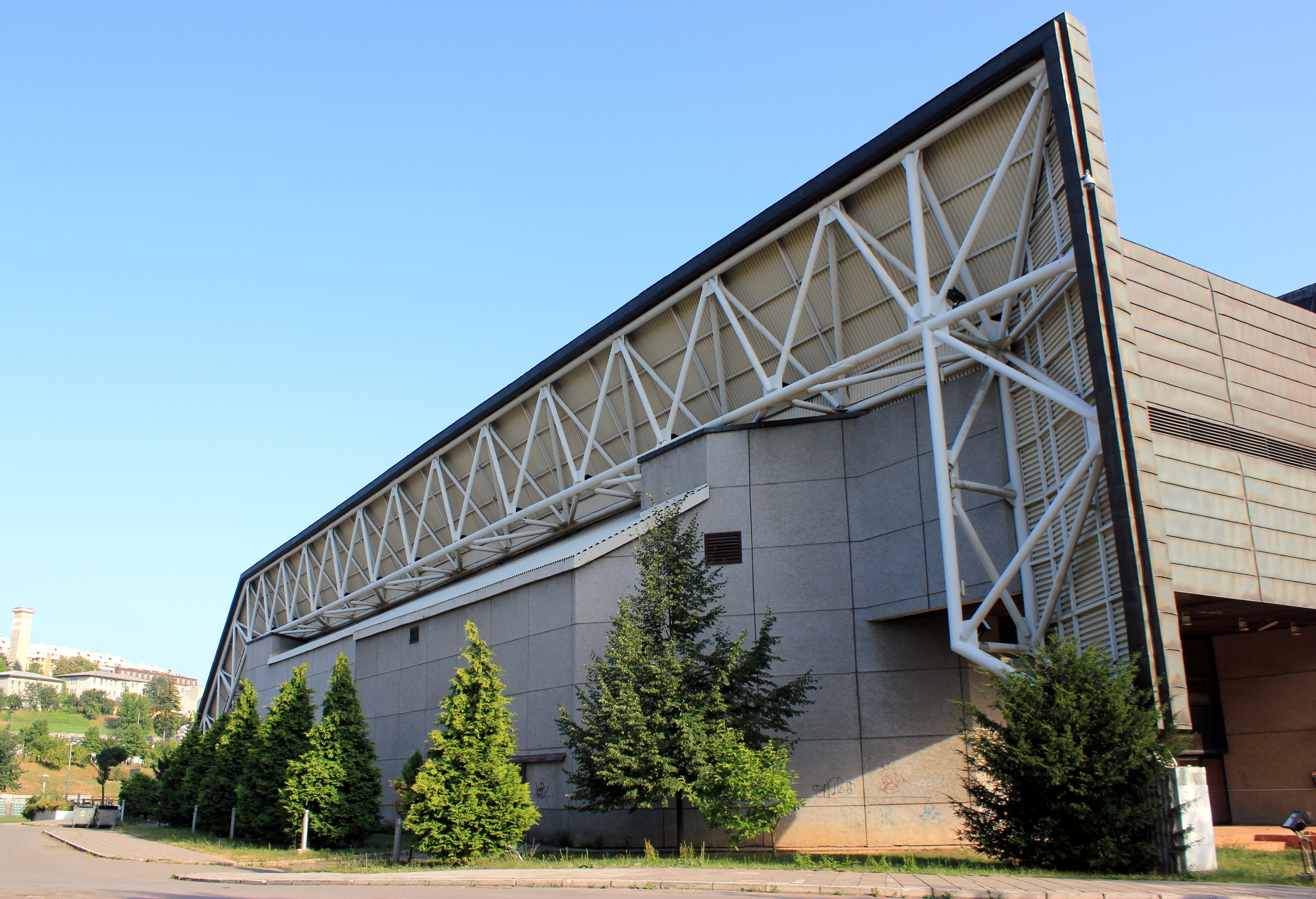
Juan Antonio Samaranch Olympic Hall hosted ice hockey at the 1984 Winter Olympics in Sarajevo.

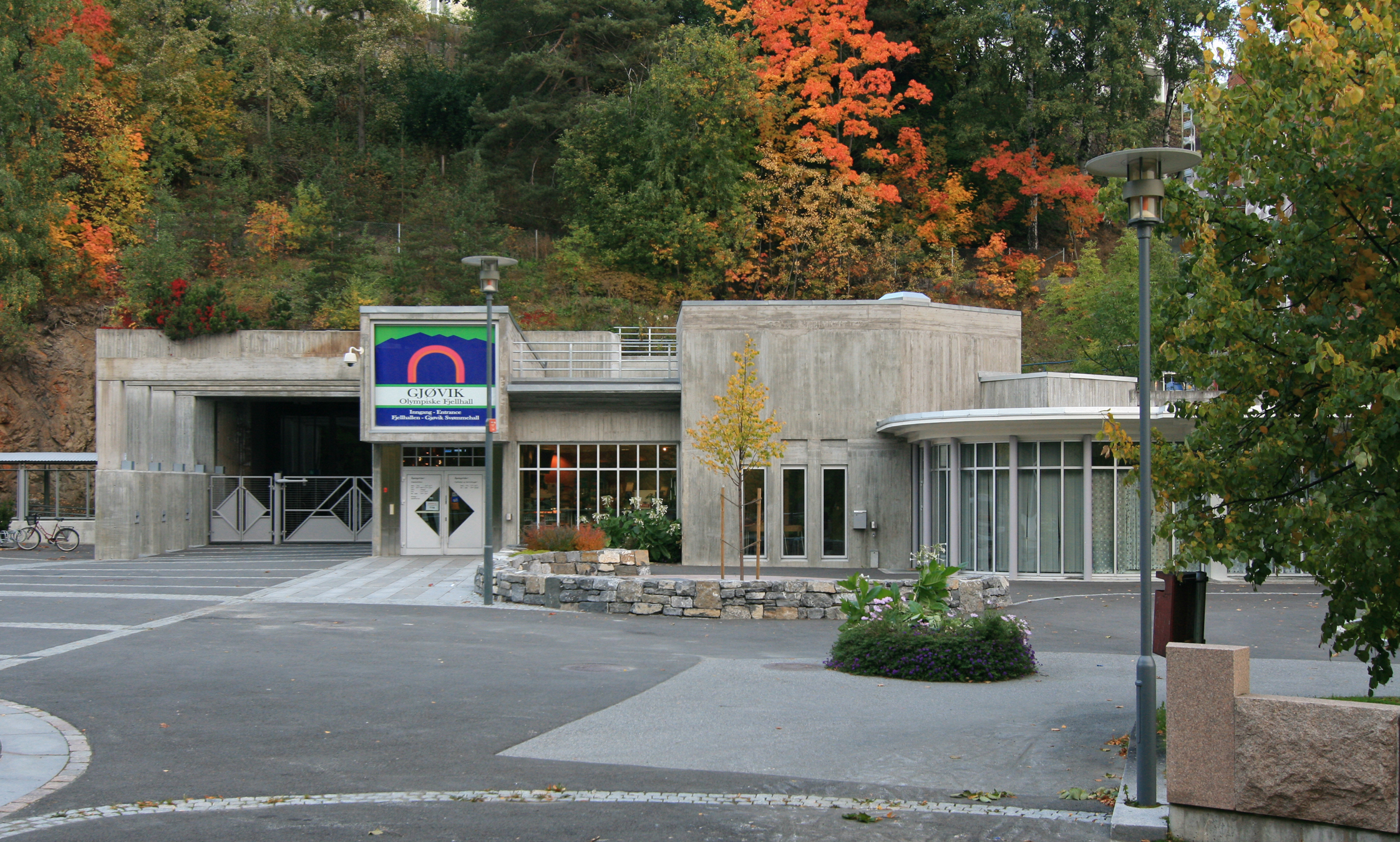
Gjøvik Olympiske Fjelhall hosted 16 ice hockey matches at the 1994 Winter Olympics in Lillehammer.

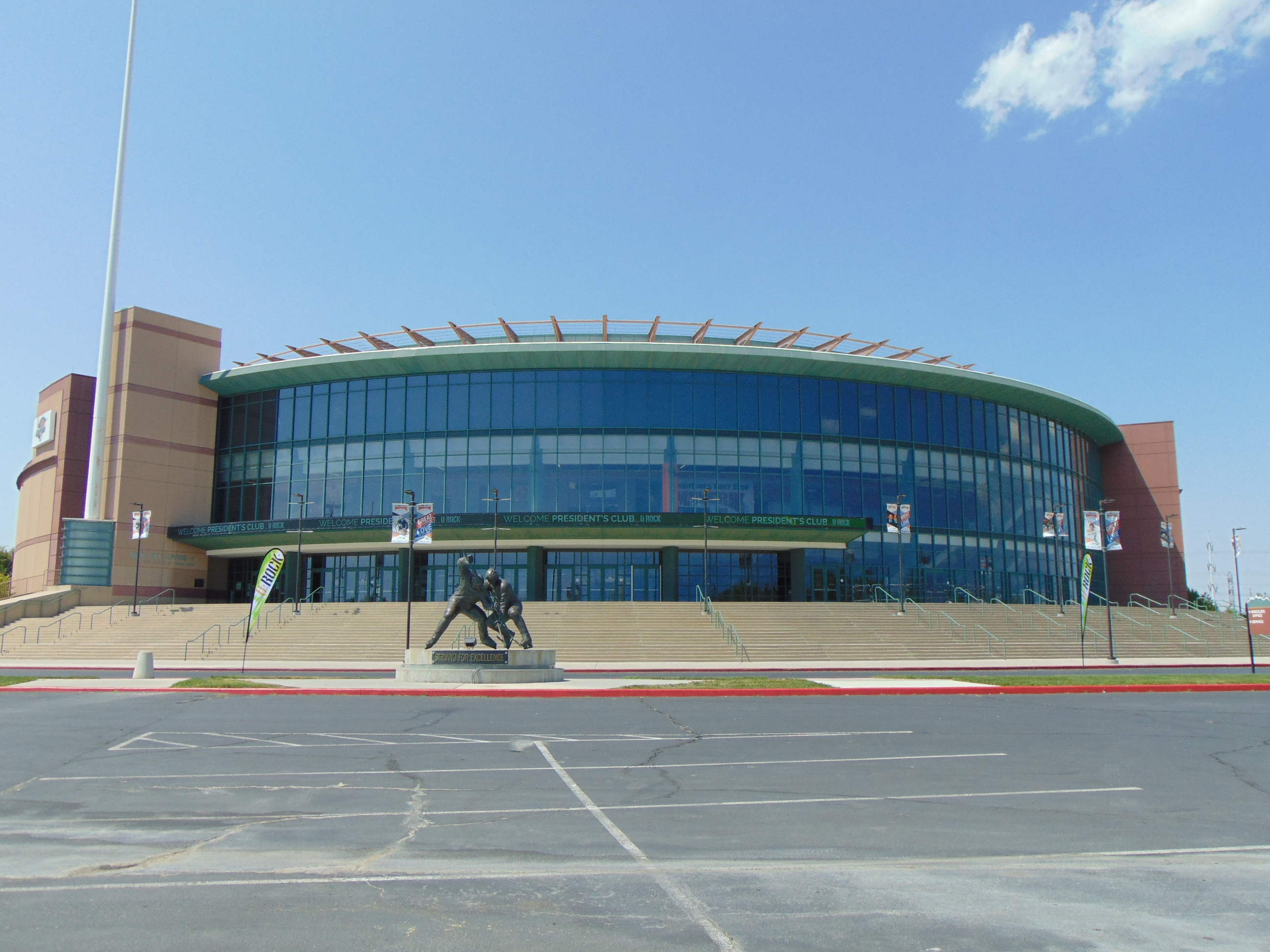
Maverick Center hosted ice hockey at the 2002 Winter Olympics in Salt Lake City.

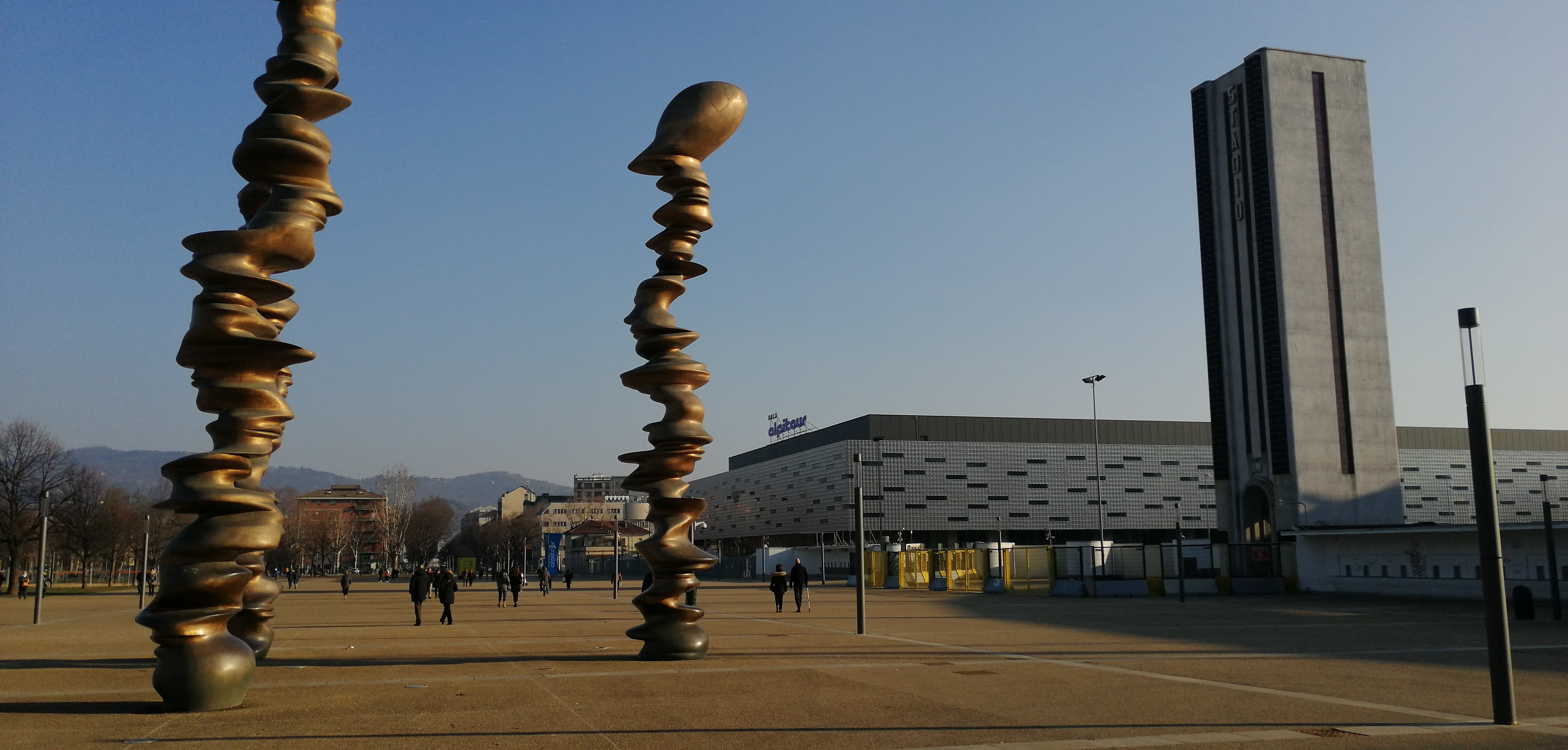
Inalpi Arena hosted ice hockey at the 2006 Winter Olympics in Turin.

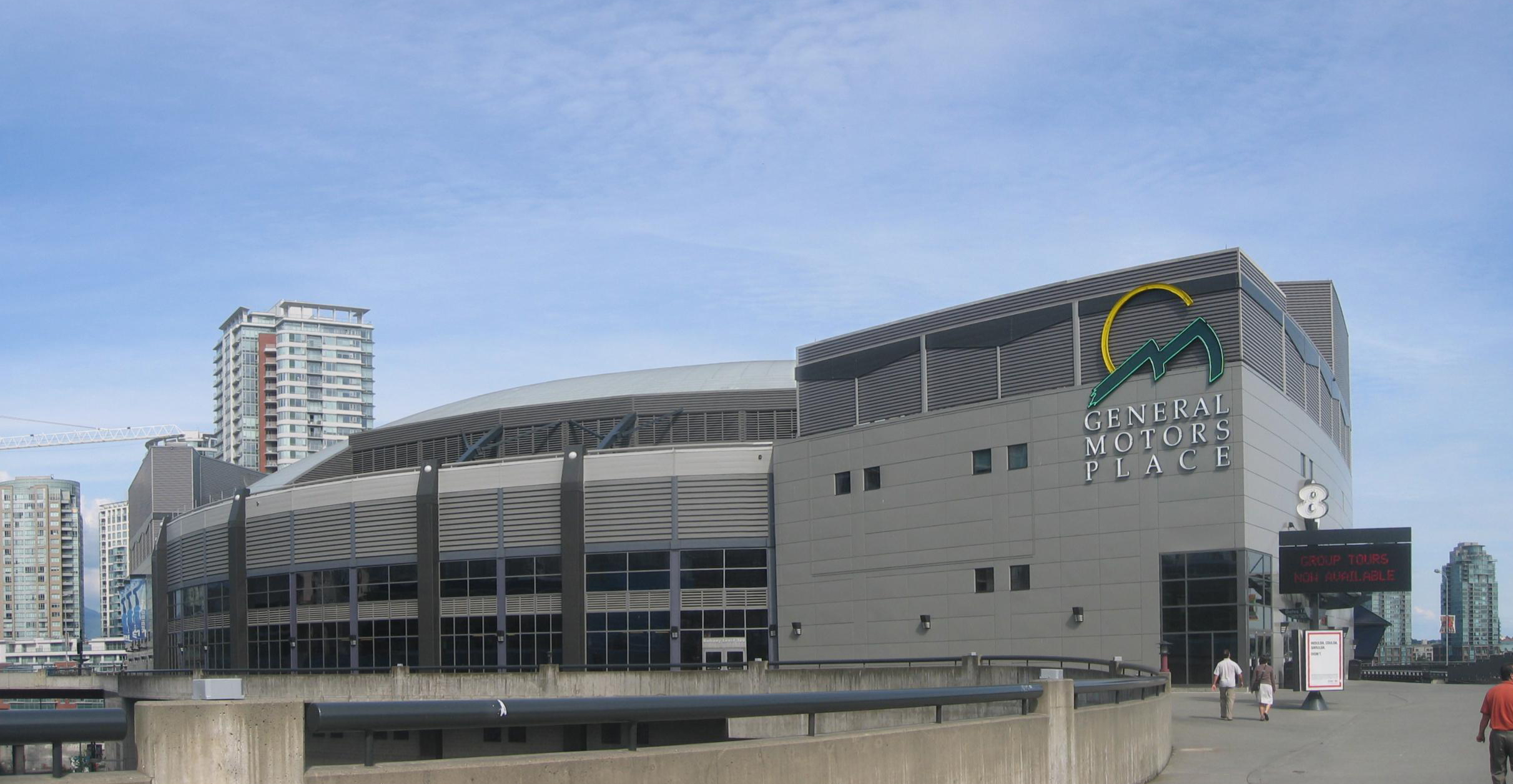
Rogers Arena hosted ice hockey at the 2010 Winter Olympics in Vancouver.

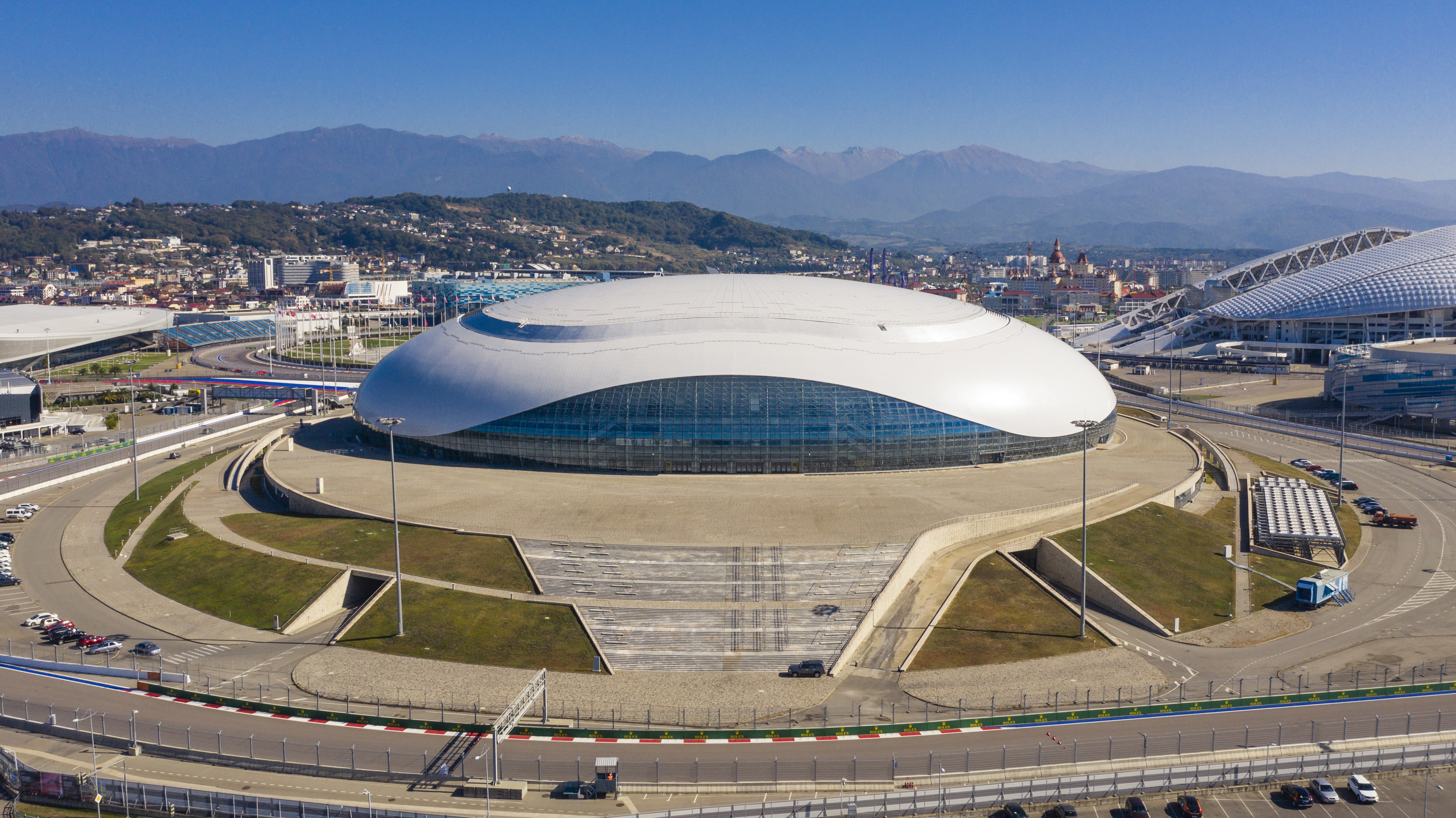
Bolshoy Ice Dome hosted ice hockey at the 2014 Winter Olympics in Sochi.

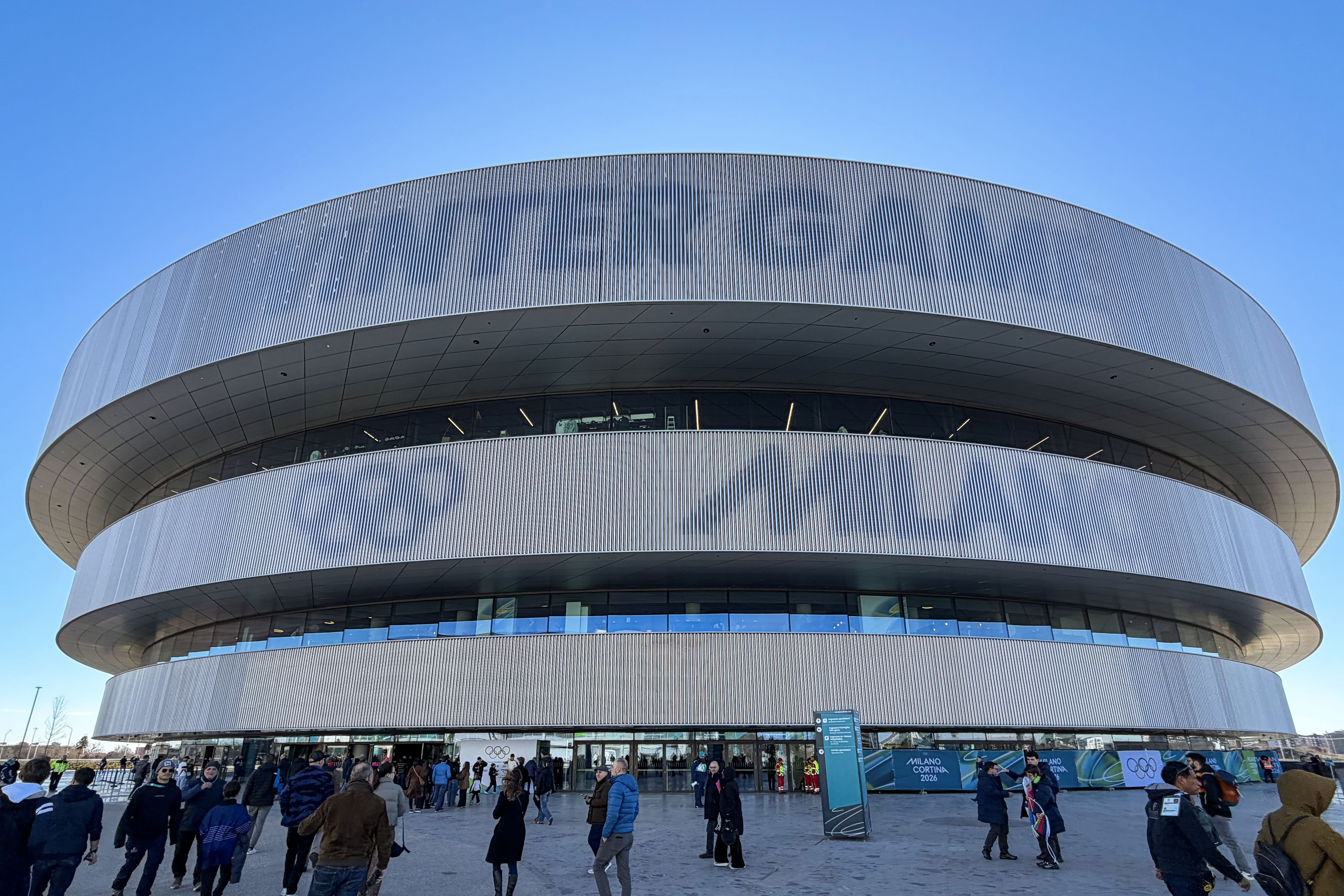
PalaItalia hosted ice hockey at the 2026 Winter Olympics in Milan.

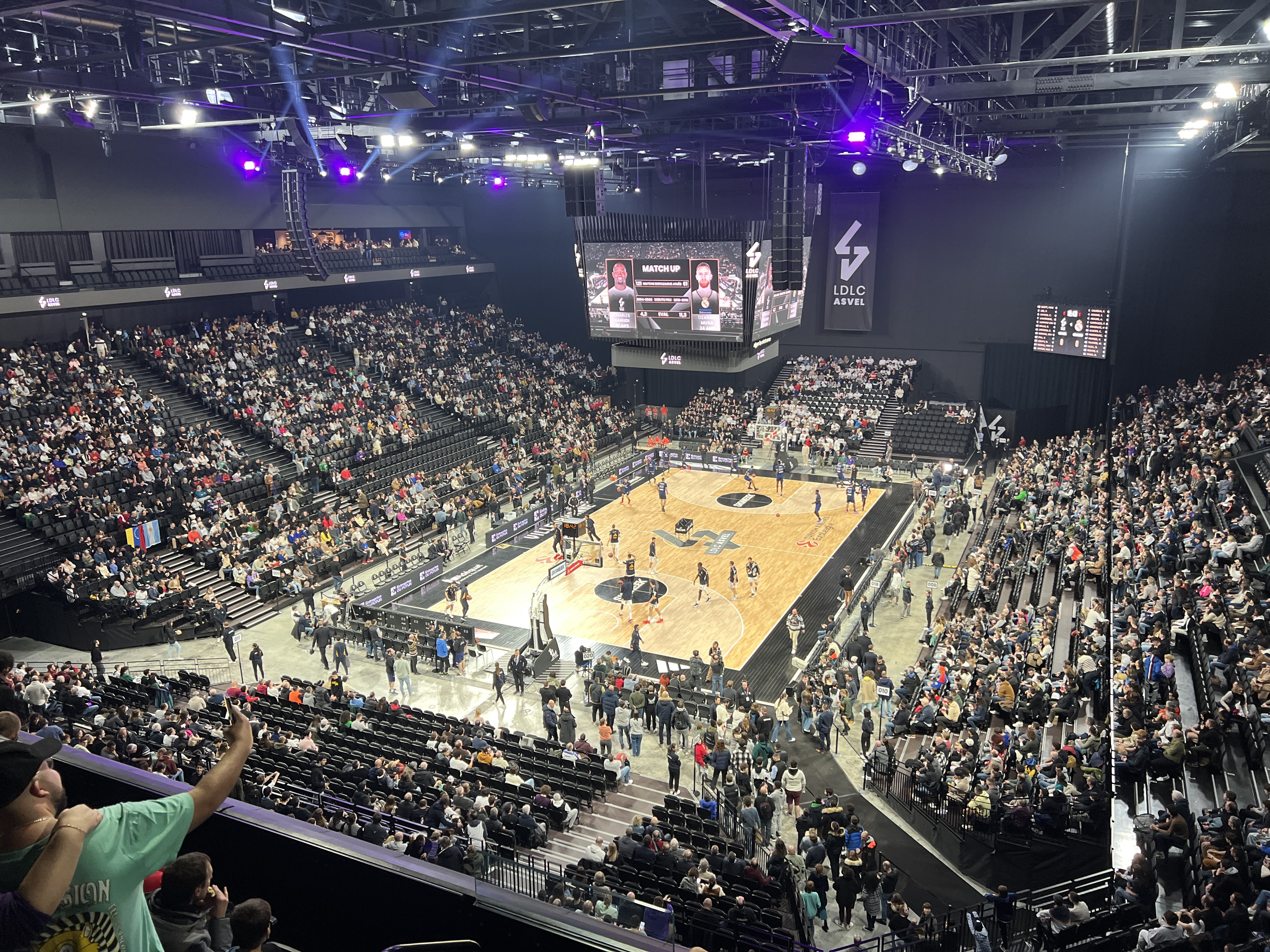
LDLC Arena in Lyon will host ice hockey for the 2030 Winter Olympics in the French Alps.

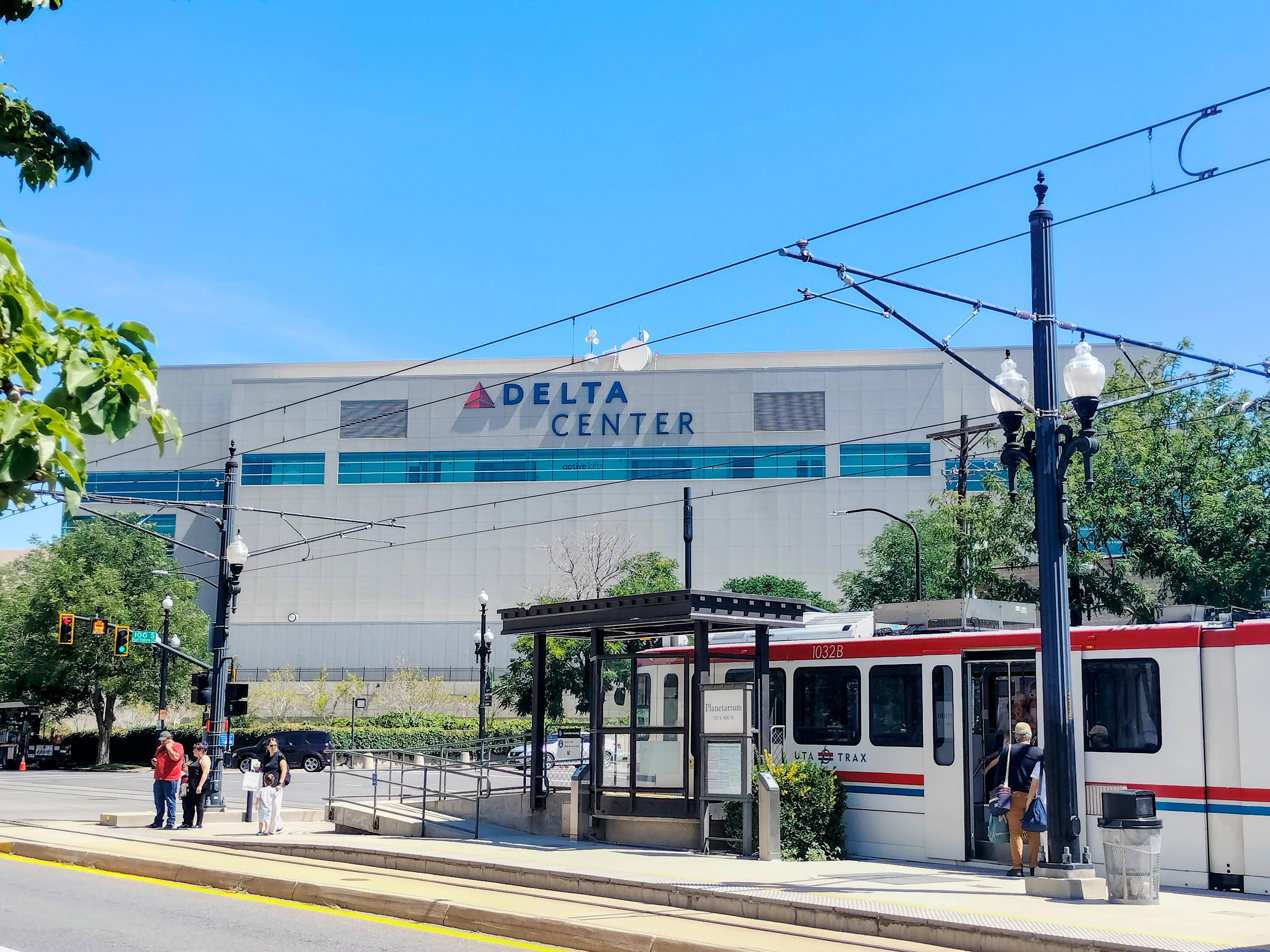
Delta Center will host ice hockey at the 2034 Winter Olympics in Utah.
