= Pál Vásárhelyi =

Hungarian ice dancer (1938–2008)

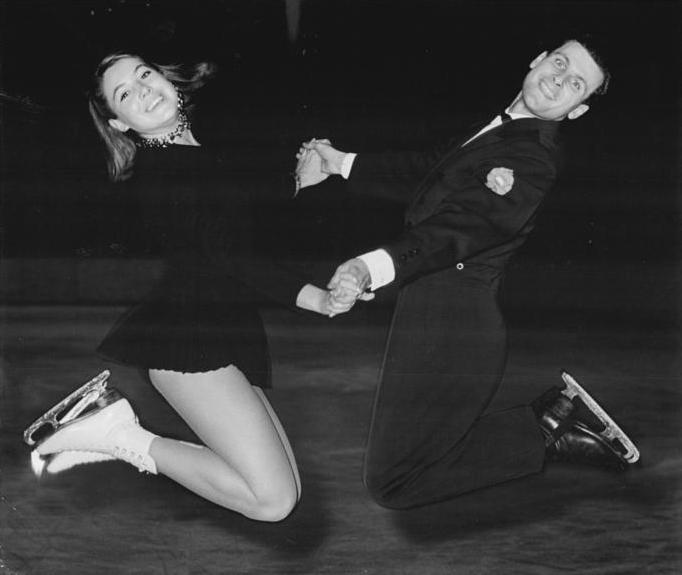
- Vásárhelyi with Korda in 1964

Personal information
- Born: 18 June 1938 Budapest
- Died: 14 September 2008 (aged 70)

Figure skating career
- Country: Hungary
- Partner: Györgyi Korda
- Skating club: Budapesti Lokomotív; Budapesti Spartacus
- Retired: 1965

Pál Vásárhelyi (18 June 1938 – 14 September 2008) was a Hungarian competitive ice dancer. With Györgyi Korda, he was the 1964 Winter Universiade champion, the 1964 Blue Swords champion, and a seven-time Hungarian national champion. The duo competed at four World and six European Championships. They placed among the European top five in 1963 (Budapest, Hungary), 1964 (Grenoble, France), and 1965 (Moscow, Soviet Union).

Vásárhelyi skated at Budapesti Lokomotív and Budapesti Spartacus. He retired from competition in 1965. He later worked as a library director at the Budapest University of Technology and Economics.

== Competitive highlights ==
With Korda

International
Event	58–59	59–60	60–61	61–62	62–63	63–64	64–65
World Champ.				10th	9th	9th	10th
European Champ.		13th	11th	12th	4th	4th	5th
Blue Swords							1st
Winter Universiade						1st	
National
Hungarian Champ.	1st	1st	1st	1st	1st	1st	1st
