= 1964 European Figure Skating Championships =

Figure skating competition

1964 European Championships
- Type: ISU Championship
- Date: January 14 – 18
- Season: 1963-64
- Location: Grenoble, France
- Venue: La Patinoire Municipale

Champions
- Men's singles: (France) Alain Calmat
- Ladies' singles: (Netherlands) Sjoukje Dijkstra
- Pairs: (West Germany) Marika Kilius / Hans-Jürgen Bäumler
- Ice dance: (Czechoslovakia) Eva Romanová / Pavel Roman
- Previous: 1963 European Championships
- Next: 1965 European Championships

The 1964 European Figure Skating Championships were held in Grenoble, France from January 14 to 18. Elite senior-level figure skaters from European ISU member nations competed for the title of European Champion in the disciplines of men's singles, ladies' singles, pair skating, and ice dancing.

== Results ==
=== Men ===
Rank	Name	Places
1	(France) Alain Calmat	
2	(West Germany) Manfred Schnelldorfer	
3	(Czechoslovakia) Karol Divín	
4	(Austria) Emmerich Danzer	
5	(Austria) Peter Jonas	
6	(West Germany) Sepp Schönmetzler	
7	(Austria) Wolfgang Schwarz	
8	(Italy) Giordano Abbondati	
9	(France) Robert Dureville	
10	(West Germany) Hugo Dümmler	
11	(France) Philippe Pélissier	
12	(Hungary) Jenő Ébert	
13	(Switzerland) Markus Germann	
14	(Netherlands) Wouter Toledo	
15	(United Kingdom) Hywel Evans	
16	(Poland) Franciszek Spitol	
WD	(Soviet Union) Valeriy Meshkov	DNS

=== Ladies ===
Rank	Name	Places
1	(Netherlands) Sjoukje Dijkstra	
2	(Austria) Regine Heitzer	
3	(France) Nicole Hassler	
4	(United Kingdom) Sally-Anne Stapleford	
5	(Austria) Helli Sengstschmid	
6	(United Kingdom) Diana Clifton-Peach	
7	(West Germany) Inge Paul	
8	(United Kingdom) Carol-Ann Warner	
9	(Austria) Ingrid Ostler	
10	(Czechoslovakia) Jana Mrázková	
11	(Hungary) Zsuzsa Almássy	
12	(Switzerland) Franziska Schmidt	
13	(Sweden) Ann-Margreth Frei	
14	(Italy) Sandra Brugnera	
15	(Belgium) Christine van de Putte	
16	(Switzerland) Monika Zing	
17	(Czechoslovakia) Alena Augustová	
18	(France) Geneviève Burdel	
19	(France) Sylvaine Duban	
20	(Poland) Elżbieta Kościk	
WD	(Norway) Karin Dehle	DNS

=== Pairs ===
Rank	Name	Places
1	(West Germany) Marika Kilius / Hans-Jürgen Bäumler	
2	(Soviet Union) Lyudmila Belousova / Oleg Protopopov	
3	(Soviet Union) Tatyana Zhuk / Aleksandr Gavrilov	
4	(West Germany) Sonja Pfersdorf / Günther Matzdorf	
5	(Switzerland) Gerda Johner / Rüdi Johner	
6	(West Germany) Sigrid Riechmann / Wolfgang Danne	
7	(Soviet Union) Tatyana Sharanova / Aleksandr Gorelik	
8	(Czechoslovakia) Agnesa Wlachovská / Peter Bartosiewicz	
9	(Austria) Gerlinde Schönbauer / Wilhelm Bietak	
10	(Hungary) Mária Csordás / László Kondi	
11	(Switzerland) Monique Mathys / Yves Ällig	
12	(Czechoslovakia) Milada Kubíková / Jaroslav Votruba	
13	(France) Micheline Joubert / Alain Trouillet	

=== Ice dance ===
Rank	Name	Places
1	(Czechoslovakia) Eva Romanová / Pavel Roman	
2	(United Kingdom) Janet Sawbridge / David Hickinbottom	
3	(United Kingdom) Yvonne Suddick / Roger Kennerson	
4	(Hungary) Györgyi Korda / Pál Vásárhelyi	31
5	(United Kingdom) Marjorie McCoy / Ian Phillips	
6	(Czechoslovakia) Jitka Babická / Jaromír Holan	
7	(West Germany) Gabriele Rauch / Rudi Matysik	
8	(France) Brigitte Martin / Francis Gamichon	
9	(Austria) Christel Trebesiner / Georg Felsinger	
10	(Netherlands) Jopie Wolf / Nico Wolf	
11	(West Germany) Jutta Peters / Wolfgang Kunz	
12	(France) Ghislaine Houdas / Pierre Brun	
13	(Switzerland) Monique Mathys / Yves Ällig	
