= Carol-Ann Warner =

British figure skater

Personal information
- Nationality: British
- Born: 13 July 1945 (age 80) London, England

Sport
- Sport: Figure skating

Carol-Ann Warner (born 13 July 1945) is a British figure skater. She competed in the ladies' singles event at the 1964 Winter Olympics.
