= La Patinoire Municipale =

Gymnasium in Grenoble, France

Coordinates: 45°11′05″N 5°44′20″E

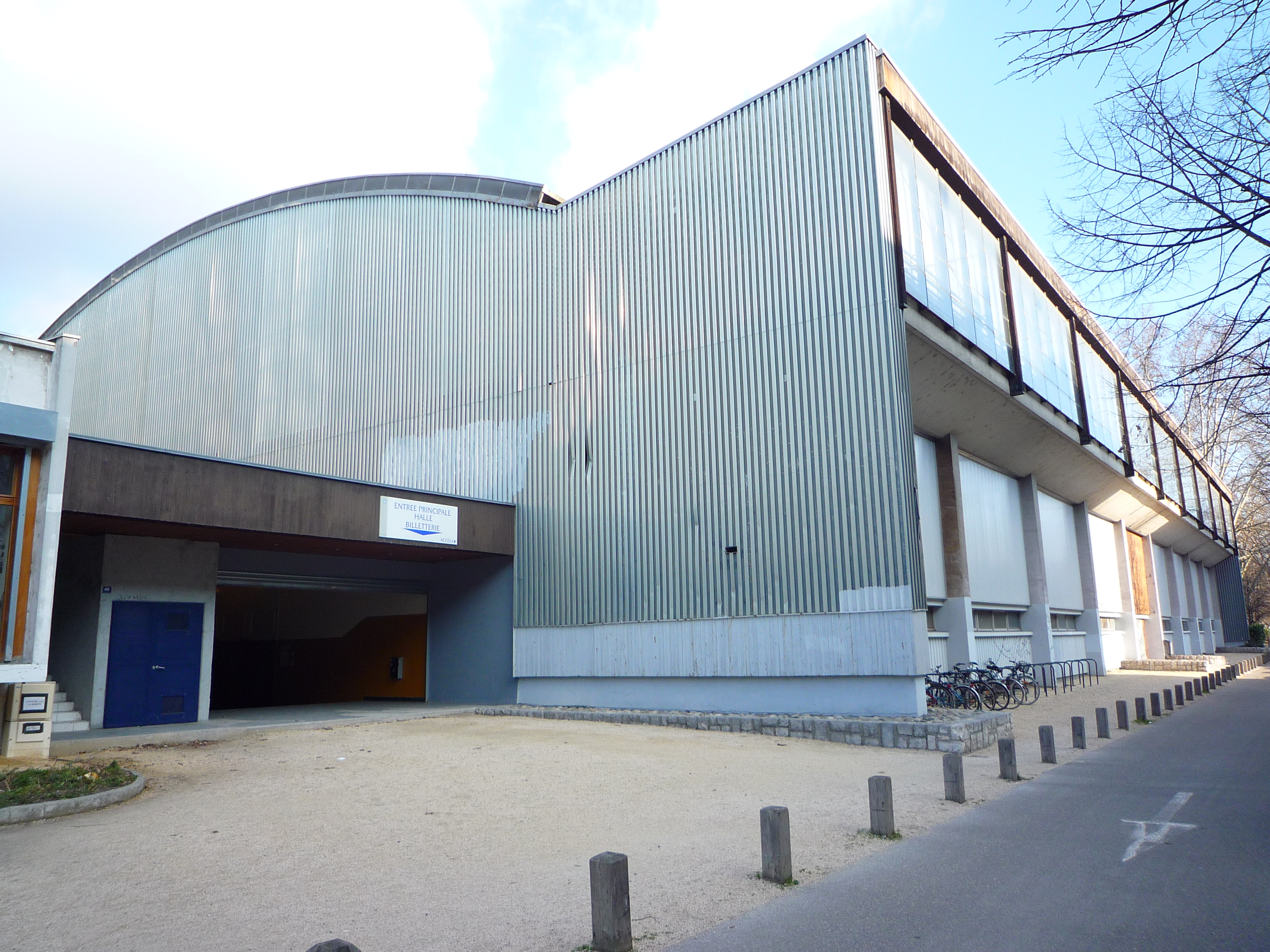
Halle Clemenceau today

La Halle Clémenceau is an gymnasium located in Grenoble, France.

Before 2001, it was La Patinoire Municipale (English: The Municipal Ice Rink), an indoor ice venue. Completed in 1963, it hosted some of the ice hockey competitions for the 1968 Winter Olympics. During those games, it seated 2700.

The venue also hosted the 1964 European Figure Skating Championships. In 2001, the building became a gymnasium called Halle Clemenceau.
